= Stanford Cardinal women's volleyball =

American college volleyball team

- University: Stanford University
- Athletic director: John Donahoe
- Head coach: Kevin Hambly (10th season)
- Conference: ACC
- Location: Stanford, California, US
- Home arena: Maples Pavilion (capacity: 7,233)
- Nickname: Cardinal
- Colors: Cardinal and white

AIAW/NCAA tournament champion
- 1992, 1994, 1996, 1997, 2001, 2004, 2016, 2018, 2019

AIAW/NCAA tournament runner-up
- 1984, 1985, 1987, 1999, 2002, 2006, 2007, 2008

AIAW/NCAA tournament semifinal
- 1982, 1983, 1984, 1985, 1986, 1987, 1992, 1994, 1995, 1996, 1997, 1999, 2001, 2002, 2004, 2006, 2007, 2008, 2014, 2016, 2017, 2018, 2019

AIAW/NCAA tournament appearance
- 1981, 1982, 1983, 1984, 1985, 1986, 1987, 1988, 1989, 1990, 1991, 1992, 1993, 1994, 1995, 1996, 1997, 1998, 1999, 2000, 2001, 2002, 2003, 2004, 2005, 2006, 2007, 2008, 2009, 2010, 2011, 2012, 2013, 2014, 2015, 2016, 2017, 2018, 2019, 2021, 2022, 2023, 2024

Conference regular season champion
- Nor-Cal Conference; 1977 WCAA; 1984 PacWest; 1985 Pac-10; 1987, 1991, 1994, 1995, 1996, 1997, 1998, 1999, 2001, 2006, 2007, 2008, 2009, 2010 Pac-12; 2012, 2014, 2017, 2018, 2019, 2022, 2023 ACC; 2025

The Stanford Cardinal women's volleyball is the team that represents Stanford University as they are in the Atlantic Coast Conference. They are currently led by their head coach Kevin Hambly and play home matches at Maples Pavilion. The team has won nine NCAA national championships, the most of all time, and 24 regular season conference titles. They have finished as national runner-up eight times and appeared in the first 39 NCAA tournaments, failing to qualify for the postseason for the first time during the 2020–21 season. In January 2017, John Dunning retired as head coach of Stanford volleyball. The school named Kevin Hambly as the new head coach. Hambly came from the University of Illinois and 2017 was his first season with the Cardinal.

== Notable players ==
- Inky Ajanaku – 2016 NCAA Championship Most Outstanding Player
- Foluke Akinradewo** – 2007 American Volleyball Coaches Association (AVCA) National Player of the Year, 2012, 2016 and 2020 indoor volleyball Olympian
- Cynthia Barboza
- Kristin Folkl**
- Jenna Gray—All-Tournament team 2016, 2018, 2019, Honda Sports Award (2019)
- Morgan Hentz– All-Tournament team 2016, 2018, 2019, co-most outstanding NCAA tournament player (2018), all-time dig records at Stanford, three time First Team All-American (2017, 2018, 2019).
- Kerri Walsh Jennings*** – 1996 Volleyball Magazine Freshman of the Year, 1996 NCAA Championship Most Outstanding Player, 1999 AVCA National Co Player of the Year, 2004, 2008, and 2012 Olympic gold medalist in beach volleyball, 2000 indoor volleyball Olympian
- Kristin Klein** – 1996 indoor volleyball Olympian
- Alix Klineman** – 2010 Volleyball Magazine Player of the Year, Pac-10 Conference Player of the Year, AVCA National Freshman of the Year, multi AVCA All-American, All-Conference selection all four years, 2007 and 2008 NCAA All-Tournament Team; second at Stanford and fifth all-time in Pac-10 history with 2,008 kills; in 2010 ranked second in the US with 5.55 kills per set and 6.25 points per set.
- Ogonna Nnamani** – 2004 AVCA National Co Player of the Year, 2004 NCAA Championship Most Outstanding Player, 2004 Honda-Broderick Cup winner, 2004 and 2008 indoor volleyball Olympian
- Beverly Oden*** – 1992 AVCA National Player of the Year, 1996 indoor volleyball Olympian
- Kim Oden – 1985 AVCA National Player of the Year, 1988, 1992 indoor volleyball Olympian
- Kathryn Plummer – 2016 AVCA National Freshman of the Year, 2017 and 2018 AVCA National Player of the Year, 2018 NCAA Championship Co Most Outstanding Player, 2019 NCAA Championship Most Outstanding Player
- Logan Tom*** – 1999 AVCA National Freshman of the Year, 2001 and 2002 AVCA National Player of the Year, 2001 NCAA Championship Most Outstanding Player, 2000, 2004, 2008 and 2012 indoor volleyball Olympian
- Cary Wendell – 1995 AVCA National Co Player of the Year

**Four-Time AVCA Division I All-Americans
***Four-Time AVCA Division I All-American First-Team Selections

== Season-by-season results ==
Stanford has appeared in every NCAA tournament since its inception in 1981 except for the 2020-21 tournament. Stanford has appeared in 17 championship games, and won 9 titles, more than any other team.

Year	Head Coach	Overall record	Conference record	Conference standing	Postseason
Bruce Downing (WCAA) (1976–1976)
1976	Bruce Downing	9–3		2nd	NCIAC Runner-Up
Art Lambert (WCAA) (1977–1977)
1977	Art Lambert	23–7–1	11–2	1st	AIAW Participant
Fred Sturm (WCAA) (1978–1983)
1978	Fred Sturm	14–7–1	10–3	2nd	
1979	Fred Sturm	15–14–2	6–6	5th	
1980	Fred Sturm	33–18	10–2	2nd	AIAW Participant
1981	Fred Sturm	31–14	10–2	2nd	NCAA Regional semifinal
1982	Fred Sturm	30–13	11–3	2nd	NCAA Fourth Place
1983	Fred Sturm	22–9	11–3	2nd	NCAA Third Place
Fred Sturm and Don Shaw (WCAA/Pac-West) (1984–1985)
1984	Fred Sturm, Don Shaw	20–5	12–2	1st	NCAA Runner-Up
1985	Fred Sturm, Don Shaw	28–3	7–1	1st	NCAA Runner-Up
Don Shaw (Pac-10) (1986–2000)
1986	Don Shaw	24–10	16–2	2nd	NCAA Final Four
1987	Don Shaw	29–7	17–1	1st	NCAA Runner-Up
1988	Don Shaw	28–3	16–2	2nd	NCAA Regional semifinal
1989	Don Shaw	18–12	13–5	T–2nd	NCAA Regional semifinal
1990	Don Shaw	27–4	16–2	2nd	NCAA Regional Final
1991	Don Shaw*	30–2	18–0	1st	NCAA Regional Final
1992	Don Shaw	31–2	16–2	2nd	NCAA Champions
1993	Don Shaw	22–7	13–5	T-2nd	NCAA Regional semifinal
1994	Don Shaw	32–1	17–1	1st	NCAA Champions
1995	Don Shaw	29–3	18–0	3rd	NCAA Final Four
1996	Don Shaw	31–2	17–1	1st	NCAA Champions
1997	Don Shaw	33–2	18–0	1st	NCAA Champions
1998	Don Shaw	27–4	17–1	1st	NCAA Regional semifinal
1999	Don Shaw	31–3	17–1	T–1st	NCAA Runner-Up
Denise Corlett (Pac-10) (2000–2000)
2000	Denise Corlett	19–12	10–8	4th	NCAA Second Round
John Dunning (Pac-10) (2001–2010)
2001	John Dunning*	33–2	17–1	1st	NCAA Champions
2002	John Dunning	32–5	15–3	2nd	NCAA Runner-Up
2003	John Dunning	25–7	14–4	2nd	NCAA Regional semifinal
2004	John Dunning	30–6	15–3	2nd	NCAA Champions
2005	John Dunning	26–6	14–4	T–2nd	NCAA Second Round
2006	John Dunning	30–4	16–2	1st	NCAA Runner-Up
2007	John Dunning	32–3	16–2	1st	NCAA Runner-Up
2008	John Dunning	31–4	17–1	1st	NCAA Runner-Up
2009	John Dunning	23–8	14–4	1st	NCAA Regional semifinal
2010	John Dunning	27–4	15–3	T–1st	NCAA Regional Final
John Dunning (Pac-12) (2011–2016)
2011	John Dunning	22–8	15–7	T–4th	NCAA Second Round
2012	John Dunning	30–4	19–1	1st	NCAA Regional Final
2013	John Dunning	27–6	17–3	2nd	NCAA Regional Final
2014	John Dunning	33–2	19–1	1st	NCAA Final Four
2015	John Dunning	23–7	16–4	3rd	NCAA Second Round
2016	John Dunning*	27–7	15–5	T–2nd	NCAA Champions
Kevin Hambly (Pac-12) (2017–2023)
2017	Kevin Hambly	30–4	19–1	1st	NCAA Final Four
2018	Kevin Hambly	34–1	20–0	1st	NCAA Champions
2019	Kevin Hambly	30–4	18–2	1st	NCAA Champions
2020	Kevin Hambly	2–8	2–8	11th	did not qualify
2021	Kevin Hambly	19–11	13–7	T–4th	NCAA Second Round
2022	Kevin Hambly	27–5	19–1	1st	NCAA Regional Final
2023	Kevin Hambly	29–4	19–1	1st	NCAA Regional Final
Kevin Hambly (ACC) (2024–Present)
2024	Kevin Hambly	28–5	17–3	T-2nd	NCAA Regional Final
Total		1,461–279–4	640–87		

* AVCA National Coach of the Year

== See also ==
- List of NCAA Division I women's volleyball programs
