= Russ Rose =

American volleyball player and coach

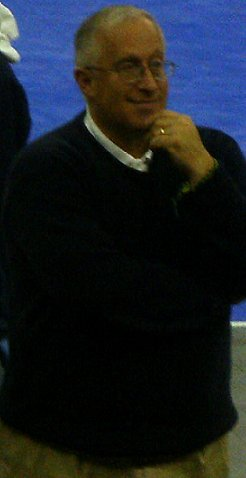
- Rose at the 2008 NCAA Final Four

Biographical details
- Born: November 29, 1953 (age 72); Chicago, Illinois, U.S.

Coaching career (HC unless noted)
- 1976–1977: George Williams College (Assistant)
- 1978: Nebraska (defensive)
- 1979–2021: Penn State

Head coaching record
- Overall: 1330–229 (.853)

Accomplishments and honors

Championships
- 7× NCAA Champions (1999, 2007–2010, 2013, 2014) 1× Atlantic 10 tournament champions (1983); 7× Atlantic 10 Champions (1984-1990) 17× Big Ten Champions (1992, 1993, 1996–1999, 2003–2010, 2012, 2013, 2017)

Awards
- 6× Atlantic 10 Coach of the Year (1984, 1985, 1987-1990) 5× AVCA National Coach of the Year (1990, 1997, 2007, 2008, 2013); 15× Big Ten Coach of the Year (1992, 1993, 1996-1998, 2005-2013, 2017, 2019); 11× AVCA Mideast Region Coach of the Year (1990, 1992-1994, 1997, 2007-2013); 1× United States Olympic Committee Coach of the Year (2000); 1× NCAA District II Coach of the Year (1996); 1× USA Volleyball All-Time Great Coach Award (2005); 2× BTN Big Ten Women's Coach of the Year (2008, 2009); 1× AVCA Northeast Region Coach of the Year (1988); 3× Volleyball Monthly Coach of the Year (1990, 1993, 1999) AVCA Hall of Fame (2007)

Records
- Winningest Coach in NCAA Division I Volleyball History (1264) (excludes 66 AIAW wins) Winningest Coach in Penn State Volleyball History (1,330) Most NCAA Volleyball National Championships (7)

Russell David Rose (born November 29, 1953) is an American former volleyball coach who was the women's volleyball coach at Penn State University from 1979 to 2021. His lifetime head coaching record is 1330–229, which ranks first in NCAA Division I history. He has the most wins and highest winning percentage of any Penn State intercollegiate athletic coach in Penn State history.

== College ==
Rose graduated from George Williams College in 1975. He was a member of the school's volleyball team that won the 1974 National Association of Intercollegiate Athletics (NAIA) national championship. He was the captain of the 1975 team that finished third in NAIA competition.

After graduation, Rose remained at George Williams for two years as a part-time coach, helping the women's volleyball team win two state titles and place sixth in national competition. He also assisted the men's team that won the national championship in 1977.

In 1978, he completed his master's degree at Nebraska, where he was the defensive coach for the Cornhusker women. While writing his thesis on volleyball statistics, he led the second team to a two-year varsity mark of 52–5.

== Penn State University ==
At Penn State, Rose's teams never posted fewer than 22 wins in a season until the COVID-19 shortened 2020 season and never had a losing season in program history. Rose earned his 900th career victory at Penn State on September 21, 2007, with a win over Michigan State (only the third Division I coach to reach the milestone). Rose was inducted into the AVCA Hall of Fame in December 2007, and has been named the AVCA National Coach of the Year five times: 1990, 1997, 2007, 2008, and 2013, more than any other Division I coach.

At one point in his career, Rose had coached 28 different All-Americans (earning 64 selections in all, with eleven 3-time selections and three 4-time selections), All-Big Ten players (earning 74 selections in all), and Academic All-Big Ten players (earning 100 selections in all). In his first 32 seasons, he coached at least one All-American on his team every season except for 2001. The 2008 national championship team that went 38–0 featured six All-Americans.

In 1999, Lauren Cacciamani was named the AVCA National Player of the Year, Big Ten Player of the Year, Big Ten Female Athlete of the Year and the Honda Award winner. Bonnie Bremner and Katie Schumacher joined Cacciamani as All-Big Ten selections in 1999. Bremner won back-to-back Big Ten Player of the Year honors in 1997 and 1998. Amanda Rome and Carrie Schonveld were recognized with honorable mention All-Big Ten status, while Mishka Levy was named to the conference's All-Freshman squad. Penn State also placed six players on the Academic All-Big Ten Team in 1999, as Bremner, Cacciamani, Kalna Miller, Schonveld, Rome and Dawn Ippolito were honored.

Rose's players earned Big Ten Freshman of the Year honors for a record six straight years and ten of eleven years (2002–07, 2009–12), Big Ten Player of the Year six straight years (2005–2010), and also picked up AVCA National Freshman of the Year in 2005, 2006, and 2010. In 2007, four players were named All-Americans, with Megan Hodge, Nicole Fawcett and Christa Harmotto taking first team and Alisha Glass named to the second team. In 2007, Christa Harmotto finished the season with the second highest hitting percentage in the nation (.492) and freshman Arielle Wilson finishing fifth in the nation with a .446 percentage.

In 2008, an AVCA record six All-Americans were named to Rose's squad. Hodge, Fawcett, Harmotto, and Glass earned first team honors while sophomores Blair Brown and Arielle Wilson earned second team honors. Senior Nicole Fawcett became Penn State's second ever AVCA National Player of the Year. Megan Hodge repeat as the NCAA Championship Most Outstanding Player in 2008 after leading her team to the victory over Stanford for Penn State's second consecutive NCAA championship.

In 2009 Penn State captured its seventh consecutive and 13th overall Big Ten title after completing the regular season 32–0 (20–0 in the Big Ten) with a 114–8 record in sets played. Covering the two consecutive 38–0 perfect seasons (238 sets), Penn State established a set record of 228–10 (96%). The Nittany Lions did not lose a set in the NCAA tournament until the national semi-finals against Hawaii; however, they won that match 3–1 to set up a showdown against the #2 Texas Longhorns. In the championship match, Texas grabbed a 2–0 set lead. During their winning streak, Penn State had never been down 0–2, but the Lions clawed their way back to win the match, 3–2, and extended their win streak to 102 games with another perfect season.

In 2010 Penn State won the first seven matches, before having their record win streak snapped at 109. They went 16–4 in Big Ten play, but still managed to win their eighth consecutive conference championship (14th overall), matching the streak of eight consecutive Atlantic 10 championships set during all eight years in the conference. Even though they dropped five matches, including four in conference, all losses were away from University Park, as they won all 20 home matches and extended their Rec Hall winning streak to 94 games.

Rose led the Lions to a regular season record of 26–5 and earned the fourth overall seed in the NCAA tournament. They only dropped one set, in the regional finals versus Duke on their way to the Final Four. They then swept Texas in the semi-finals and swept California in the championship match to claim their fourth consecutive national championship and a final record of 32–5. Penn State set an NCAA record of winning 24 consecutive postseason games. The championship was Rose's fifth, a record for most by a single coach in NCAA history.

In 2013, Rose won his sixth national title with the Nittany Lions. His squad earned four AVCA All-American's honors in Micha Hancock, Ariel Scott, Deja McClendon, and Katie Slay. Hancock also won the 2013 NCAA Championship Most Outstanding Player award after leading her team to the victory over Big Ten foe Wisconsin for the title, 3–1.

In 2014, despite having to replace three All-Americans in McClendon, Scott, and Slay, Rose coached the Nittany Lions to their seventh national championship, which gave them the most women's volleyball titles at the time, ahead of Stanford (6). Throughout his career, the team appeared in all 41 NCAA tournaments, the only team to do so.

=== Other work at Penn State ===
In addition to being the volleyball coach, Rose was also a professor at Penn State; he taught a sports ethics class: KINES 493 Principles and Ethics of Coaching.

Additionally, in November 2011, Coach Rose was tapped to be a member of the search committee to hire the new head football coach after the termination of legendary coach Joe Paterno.

== International ==
Throughout his career, Rose has been called upon to share his expertise with the coaches and players who represent the United States in international competition. An instructor in the USVBA coaches certification program, Rose has served as a national referee and evaluator and state director for volleyball for the Special Olympics. Rose was a member of the NCAA Division I Volleyball Committee for six years and the NCAA representative to the United States Volleyball Association Rules Committee.

In 1981, Rose coached the U.S. women's team at the 1981 Maccabiah Games in which they won the silver medal. A year later, he was an assistant coach for the women's team that won the bronze medal at the 1982 National Sports Festival. He returned to the National Sports Festival in 1983, this time as the East women's head coach and once again winning the bronze medal. In 1985, he returned to the Maccabiah Games as the head coach of the U.S. men's team, winning the bronze medal.

In 1989, Rose was an assistant coach with the United States men's national team for an exhibition series with Canada and the Soviet Union. His work on the international scene was to have continued in July of that year, but personal commitments and time constraints prevented him from accepting the position as head coach of the U.S. women's team to the Maccabiah Games. In 1990, he worked with the men's national and developmental teams during the training camps in San Diego. In 1993, he assisted with the U.S. men's matches with Canada and the U.S. women's team against China

After taking few years off to focus on Penn State, he returned to the international scene from 1998 to 2000, assisting with the U.S. men's team as they prepared for the 2000 Summer Olympics in Sydney, Australia. In the summer of 2002, Rose assisted the U.S. men's team on a 13-day tour of Italy where the athletes competed against the world's top teams, including Brazil, Italy, Yugoslavia, Russia and the Netherlands.

In 2005, USA Volleyball named Rose one of their All-Time Great Coaches, making him the first Big Ten coach to ever receive the honor and putting him in the company of the best volleyball coaches in history, including previous Olympic coaches as well as many of their peers.

== Professional ==
Rose coached professional men's volleyball in Puerto Rico in 1976.

== Awards and honors ==
- 1984 – Atlantic 10 Coach of the Year
- 1985 – Atlantic 10 Coach of the Year
- 1987 – Atlantic 10 Coach of the Year
- 1988 – Atlantic 10 Coach of the Year, AVCA Northeast Region Coach of the Year
- 1989 – Atlantic 10 Coach of the Year
- 1990 – AVCA National Coach of the Year, AVCA Mideast Region Coach of the Year, Volleyball Monthly Coach of the Year, Atlantic 10 Coach of the Year
- 1992 – AVCA Mideast Region Coach of the Year, Big Ten Coach of the Year
- 1993 – AVCA Mideast Region Coach of the Year, Big Ten Coach of the Year, Volleyball Monthly Coach of the Year
- 1994 – AVCA Mideast Region Coach of the Year
- 1996 – Big Ten Coach of the Year, NCAA District II Coach of the Year
- 1997 – AVCA National Coach of the Year, AVCA Mideast Region Coach of the Year, Big Ten co-Coach of the Year
- 1998 – Big Ten Coach of the Year
- 1999 – Volleyball Monthly Coach of the Year
- 2000 – United States Olympic Committee Coach of the Year
- 2003 – Big Ten Coach of the Year, Rose also celebrated 25 years of coaching at Penn State. He was honored with a bench outside of the post office sponsored by the Penn State Booster Club and was surprised with a gathering of more than 40 former players and members of the program, who offered their thoughts and insights on Rose and his career.
- 2005 – Big Ten Coach of the Year, USA Volleyball All-Time Great Coach Award (Donald S. Shondell Contemporary Division Award)
- 2006 – Big Ten Coach of the Year
- 2007 – AVCA Hall of Fame induction, AVCA National Coach of the Year, AVCA Mideast Region Coach of the Year, Big Ten Coach of the Year
- 2008 – BTN Big Ten Women's Coach of the Year, Big Ten Coach of the Year, AVCA National Coach of the Year, AVCA Mideast Region Coach of the Year
- 2009 – BTN Big Ten Women's Coach of the Year, Big Ten Coach of the Year, AVCA Mideast Region Coach of the Year
- 2010 – Big Ten Coach of the Year, AVCA Mideast Region Coach of the Year
- 2012 – Big Ten Coach of the Year, AVCA Mideast Region Coach of the Year
- 2013 – Big Ten Coach of the Year, AVCA Mideast Region Coach of the Year, AVCA National Coach of the Year
- 2017 - Big Ten Coach of the Year
- 2019 - Big Ten Coach of the Year

== Head coaching record ==
Record table
Season	Team	Overall	Conference	Standing	Postseason
Penn State Nittany Lions (independent) (1979–1982)
1979	Penn State	32–9			EAIAW Participant
1980	Penn State	34–11			EAIAW & AIAW Participant
1981	Penn State	44–5			NCAA regional semifinal
1982	Penn State	26–15			NCAA first round
Penn State Nittany Lions (Atlantic 10 Conference) (1983–1990)
1983	Penn State	36–10	(Note: No regular season competition)	1st	NCAA regional semifinal
1984	Penn State	30–6	5–0	1st	NCAA regional semifinal
1985	Penn State	31–5	5–0	1st	NCAA first round
1986	Penn State	38–5	7–0	1st	NCAA regional semifinal
1987	Penn State	27–9	8–0	1st	NCAA first round
1988	Penn State	36–4	8–0	1st	NCAA first round
1989	Penn State	34–7	8–0	1st	NCAA first round
1990	Penn State	44–1	8–0	1st	NCAA Regional final
Penn State Nittany Lions (Big Ten Conference) (1991–2021)
1991	Penn State	26–6	15–5	2nd	NCAA regional semifinal
1992	Penn State	28–4	19–1	T-1st	NCAA regional semifinal
1993	Penn State	31–5	18–2	1st	NCAA runner-up
1994	Penn State	31–4	17–3	2nd	NCAA Final Four
1995	Penn State	27–8	14–6	3rd	NCAA regional semifinal
1996	Penn State	31–3	18–2	T-1st	NCAA Regional final
1997	Penn State	34–2	19–1	T-1st	NCAA runner-up
1998	Penn State	35–1	20–0	1st	NCAA runner-up
1999	Penn State	36–1	20–0	1st	NCAA Champions
2000	Penn State	30–6	16–4	3rd	NCAA Regional final
2001	Penn State	22–8	14–6	3rd	NCAA second round
2002	Penn State	25–8	14–6	2nd	NCAA second round
2003	Penn State	31–5	17–3	1st	NCAA Regional final
2004	Penn State	29–3	18–2	1st	NCAA regional semifinal
2005	Penn State	31–3	20–0	1st	NCAA regional semifinal
2006	Penn State	32–3	18–2	1st	NCAA Regional final
2007	Penn State	34–2	20–0	1st	NCAA Champions
2008	Penn State	38–0	20–0	1st	NCAA Champions
2009	Penn State	38–0	20–0	1st	NCAA Champions
2010	Penn State	32–5	16–4	1st	NCAA Champions
2011	Penn State	25–8	16–4	2nd	NCAA regional semifinal
2012	Penn State	33–3	19–1	1st	NCAA Final Four
2013	Penn State	34–2	19–1	1st	NCAA Champions
2014	Penn State	36–3	18–2	2nd	NCAA Champions
2015	Penn State	28–6	15–5	4th	NCAA regional semifinal
2016	Penn State	24–10	14–6	4th	NCAA regional semifinal
2017	Penn State	33–2	19–1	T-1st	NCAA Final Four
2018	Penn State	26–8	14–6	4th	NCAA Regional final
2019	Penn State	27–6	17–3	T-2nd	NCAA Regional final
2020	Penn State	10–6	9–5	6th	NCAA regional semifinal
2021	Penn State	21–11	13–7	6th	NCAA second round
Penn State:		1,330–229 (.853)	575–88 (.867)		
Total:		1,330–229 (.853)			
National champion Postseason invitational champion Conference regular season champion Conference regular season and conference tournament champion Division regular season champion Division regular season and conference tournament champion Conference tournament champion

== Personal life ==
In 1986, Rose married Lori Barberich, a former three-time All-American at Penn State.

== Bibliography ==
- The Volleyball Coaching Bible (Human Kinetics Copyright 2002)
- Volleyball Drills for Champions Book (Human Kinetics Copyright 1999)

== See also ==
- List of college women's volleyball coaches with 750 wins
