= Don Shaw (volleyball) =

American volleyball coach (born 1951)

Donald Shaw
Biographical details
- Born: February 9, 1951 (age 75); Los Angeles, California, U.S.
- Education: UC Santa Barbara

Playing career
- 1979: (United States) USA National Team
- 1979-1980: (United States) San Jose Diablos

Coaching career (HC unless noted)
- 1976: UCSB (Asst.)
- 1980–1983: Stanford (Asst., men's/women's)
- 1984-1985: Stanford (Co-HC, men's/women's)
- 1986–1999: Stanford (women's)
- 2001–2006: Stanford (men's)

Accomplishments and honors

Championships
- 4x NCAA Division I Women's National Champions (1992, 1994, 1996, 1997) 8x Pac-10 regular season champions (1987, 1991, 1994, 1995, 1996, 1997, 1998, 1999) PacWest regular season champions (1985) WCAA regular season champions (1984)

Awards
- AVCA Division I Women's National Coach of the Year (1991) AVCA Hall of Fame induction (2008); Volleyball Magazine Coach of the Year (1997); AVCA Regional Coach of the Year (1992, 1994, 1997) Stanford Athletics Hall of Fame induction (2011); USAV All-time Great Coach Award (2014)

Donald Shaw (born February 9, 1951) is a retired American volleyball coach and player.

Over a combined 27 years, he coached for the men and women's volleyball teams at Stanford, winning NCAA titles with the women's team four times: in 1992, 1994, 1996, and 1997. Shaw was inducted into the Stanford Athletics Hall of Fame in 2011.

Shaw is considered to be one of the most successful volleyball coaches in NCAA history, and his .863 winning percentage is the best in NCAA women's collegiate volleyball history.

== Personal life ==
Shaw is from Pacific Palisades, California and he graduated from Palisades High School. In high school, he excelled in baseball and basketball, was a member of the 1969 LA City Basketball Champions and was selected by the Kansas City Royals in the 1969 Major League Baseball draft. Shaw played basketball Santa Monica College from 1969–71 (where he was All-Conference both years and 1970–71 SMC Athlete of the Year) and at Loyola Marymount at the forward position from 1971–73, and led the West Coast Athletic Conference in free throw percentage (85.3) in 1971–72. Shaw continued his basketball career playing in Europe and South America from 1973–74.

Don Shaw was married to Carolyn Walker Shaw from 1988–2001. He received a bachelor's degree in sociology with an athletic coaching minor from UC Santa Barbara in 1977.

Shaw has two children, both of whom went on to have successful volleyball careers. His son, James Shaw, is a member of the United States men's national volleyball team and played volleyball at Stanford, where he was an AVCA First Team All-American. His daughter, Jordan Shaw, played volleyball for the USA A2 Junior National Team that won gold at the 2011 European Global Challenge and collegiately for St. Mary's, where she earned honorable mention All-America honors.

== Playing career ==
Shaw was a member of the indoor U.S. National Team in 1979 and played professionally for the San Jose Diablos in 1979 and 1980.

Shaw also played beach volleyball, notably with fellow Hall of Fame player Karch Kiraly. They placed third in the 1978 World Championship volleyball tournament. Shaw earned the highest beach rating possible (AAA) and competed in the World Beach Championships.

== Coaching career ==
After beginning his career as an assistant coach at UC Santa Barbara, Shaw began his Stanford coaching career in 1980 when he was an assistant on both the men and women's teams until 1983, under Fred Sturm. He head coached both the men’s and women’s teams at Stanford for a combined 27 years starting in 1984. In 1984 and 1985, he was the co-head coach with Sturm for both programs before becoming the solo head coach for the women's team from 1986 to 1999. Shaw took a leave of absence in 2000 and in 2001, he announced that he was leaving the women's program to take over the men's team for the second time, a position he would hold until retiring from collegiate coaching in 2006.

Shaw is regarded as one of the best NCAA volleyball coaches of all time as he shaped the Stanford women's team into a national powerhouse. Shaw led the team to its first NCAA championship in 1992 and through present-day, Stanford is the record holder for most NCAA championships amongst Division I programs (9).

=== Stanford (women) ===
Shaw was the co-head coach with Sturm in the 1984 and 1985 seasons with the women's volleyball team, before being the sole head coach beginning in 1986. In his sixteen seasons with the Stanford women's volleyball team, Shaw had a record of 440–70. He led Stanford to the NCAA Championship match eight times, winning the NCAA national championships in 1992, 1994, 1996, and 1996. In addition to four NCAA titles, he also led Stanford to 10 conference titles, including six Pac-10 Championships in a row from 1994 to 1999.

Seven of his Stanford players have earned AVCA National Player of the Year honors, including Kim Oden, Bev Oden, Kristin Klein, Cary Wendell, and Kerri Walsh.

=== Stanford (men) ===
Shaw was the co-head coach with Sturm in the 1984 and 1985 seasons with the men's volleyball team and returned to coach from 2002 until 2006. Throughout all seasons, he holds a record of 122–128.

Notable men's players that Shaw coached at Stanford was ‘88 Gold Medalist Scott Fortune who was the captain of the 1992 men's Olympic team, ‘88 Gold Medalist Jon Root and ‘08 Gold Medalist Kevin Hansen.

=== Other coaching works ===
Shaw served as an assistant coach for the gold medal-winning United States Men's Team at the 1982 National Sports Festival as well as the assistant for the U.S. Women's Team at the 1991 Pan American Games in Havana, Cuba.

== Head coaching record ==
Record table
Season	Team	Overall	Conference	Standing	Postseason
Stanford Cardinal (men's) (Intercollegiate Volleyball Association) (1984–1985)
1984	Stanford	13–15	6–12	8th	did not qualify
1985	Stanford	23–10	10–8	5th	did not qualify
Stanford:		36–25 (.590)	16–20 (.444)		
Stanford Cardinal (men's) (MPSF) (2002–2002)
2002	Stanford	17–9	15–7	5th	did not qualify
2003	Stanford	17–12	14–8	4th	did not qualify
2004	Stanford	9–18	6–16	10th	did not qualify
2005	Stanford	11–25	10–12	8th	did not qualify
2006	Stanford	4–24	2–20	11th	did not qualify
Stanford:		86–103 (.455)	63–83 (.432)		
Stanford Cardinal (women's) (WCAA) (1984–1984)
1984	Stanford	20–5	12–2	1st	NCAA National runner-up
Stanford:		20–5 (.800)	12–2 (.857)		
Stanford Cardinal (women's) (PacWest) (1985–1985)
1985	Stanford	28–3	7–1	1st	NCAA National runner-up
Stanford:		28–3 (.903)	7–1 (.875)		
Stanford Cardinal (women's) (Pac-10) (1986–1999)
1986	Stanford	24–10	16–2	2nd	NCAA Final Four
1987	Stanford	29–7	17–1	1st	NCAA National runner-up
1988	Stanford	28–3	16–2	2nd	NCAA regional semifinal
1989	Stanford	18–12	13–5	T–2nd	NCAA regional semifinal
1990	Stanford	27–4	16–2	2nd	NCAA Regional final
1991	Stanford	30–2	18–0	1st	NCAA Regional final
1992	Stanford	31–2	16–2	2nd	NCAA Champions
1993	Stanford	22–7	13–5	T–2nd	NCAA regional semifinals
1994	Stanford	32–1	17–1	1st	NCAA Champions
1995	Stanford	29–3	18–0	1st	NCAA Final Four
1996	Stanford	31–2	17–1	1st	NCAA Champions
1997	Stanford	33–2	18–0	1st	NCAA Champions
1998	Stanford	27–4	17–1	1st	NCAA regional semifinals
1999	Stanford	31–3	17–1	T–1st	NCAA National runner-up
Stanford:		392–62 (.863)	229–23 (.909)		
Total:		562–198 (.739)			
National champion Postseason invitational champion Conference regular season champion Conference regular season and conference tournament champion Division regular season champion Division regular season and conference tournament champion Conference tournament champion
