= List of college women's volleyball career coaching wins leaders =

This is a list of college women's volleyball coaches in the United States with a minimum of 750 wins at the collegiate level. Entering 2023, Peggy Martin, who previously coached at Central Missouri and currently coaches at Spring Hill College, is the all-time leader with 1,434 wins. Russ Rose of Penn State achieved the most NCAA Division I wins with 1,330. Dave Shoji of Hawaii, with 1202 Division I wins, leads in win percentage at .855.

== College women's volleyball coaches with 750 wins ==
=== Key ===
*	Active coach entering 2025
†	Inducted into the International Volleyball Hall of Fame
#	Inducted into the American Volleyball Coaches Association Hall of Fame

=== Coaches ===
Four-year colleges only. Includes DGWS/AIAW (1969–1981) and NCAA (1981–present). Includes NAIA and NCCAA where noted. Years shown are for seasons coached, not dates employed. The earliest seasons extended into January (e.g., the 1971–72 season). Statistics are through the 2025 season.

Rank	Name	Years	Wins	Losses	Ties	Pct.	Teams
1*	Peggy Martin#	49	1514	383	8	.797	Central Missouri (1975–1978, 1980–2008), Spring Hill (2009–2019, 2021–present); includes NAIA 142–36 record, 2009–2013)
2	Larry Bock#	41	1348	295	0	.820	Juniata (1977–2010), Navy (2011–2017)
3	Russ Rose#	43	1330	229	0	.853	Penn State (1979–2021)
4	Tracy Rietzke	38	1277	285	0	.818	Kansas Wesleyan (1982–1987, NAIA), Rockhurst (1988–2019; NAIA until 1999)
5	Vickie Grooms Denny	41	1245	419	0	.748	Maranatha Baptist (1982–1987), Clearwater Christian (1989–2014), Bob Jones (2016–2024) (all NCCAA schools)
6	Chris Catanach#	41	1227	223	0	.846	Tampa (1984–2024)
7	Dave Shoji#	42	1202	204	1	.855	Hawaii (1975–2016)
8	Shelton Collier#	41	1150	301	0	.793	Pittsburgh (1980–1988), Georgia Tech (1991–2001), Wingate (2002–2022)
9*	Julie Jenkins	42	1132	448	0	.716	VCU (1984), Trinity (TX) (1985–present)
10	Andy Banachowski†#	43	1106	301	0	.786	UCLA (1965–1968 (3 seasons, no records kept); 1970–2009)
11	Rich Luenemann#	32	1070	324	0	.768	St. Francis (IL) (1981–1998; NAIA), Washington (MO) (1999–2012)
12	Mary Wise	38	1068	213	0	.836	Iowa State (1981–1984), Florida (1991–2024)
13*	Rick Squiers	33	1040	177	0	.855	Hastings (1993–1998), Nebraska–Kearney (1999–present)
14	Mick Haley#	34	957	256	0	.788	Texas (1980–1996), USC (2001–2017)
15*	Chris Poole	39	955	378	0	.716	Arkansas Tech (1986), Arkansas State (1987–92), Arkansas (1994–2007), Florida State (2008–present)
16	Karen Chisum	40	919	559	3	.622	Texas State (1980–2019)
17	Mike Hebert#	35	892	374	0	.705	Pittsburgh (1976–1979), New Mexico (1980–1982), Illinois (1983–1995), Minnesota (1996–2010)
18	John Dunning#	32	888	185	0	.828	Pacific (1985–2000), Stanford (2001–2016)
19	Elaine Michaelis#	33	886	219	5	.800	BYU (1969–2001)
20	John Cook#	32	883	176	0	.834	Wisconsin (1992–1998), Nebraska (2000–2024)
21	Kathy Gregory†	38	882	412	0	.682	UC Santa Barbara (1975–2013)
22*	Mark Birtwistle	35	871	283	0	.755	Eastern (1990–present)
23*	Debbie Humphreys	38	869	384	0	.694	Stephen F. Austin (1988–present)
24	Joe Sagula	42	865	507	0	.630	Penn (1981–89), North Carolina (1990–2023)
25	Brian Gimmillaro#	32	835	221	0	.791	Long Beach State (1985–2016)
25	Kandis Schram	36	828	431	0	.658	Maryville (TN) (1986–2022)
25	Debby Colberg#	32	828	292	0	.739	Sacramento State (1976–2007)
27	Jennifer McDowell	26	826	182	0	.819	Emory (1996–2022)
29	Joan Sitterly#	22	816	234	0	.777	Cortland (1983–2004)
30	Marlene Piper	32	815	327	4	.713	Portland State (1969–1983), California (1984–1987), UC–Davis (1988–1993), Willamette (1994–2001)
31	Barry Goldberg	34	812	311	0	.723	American (1989–2022)
31	Kris Russell	24	812	231	0	.779	Wisconsin–Whitewater (1981–2004)
33	Tom Hilbert	34	811	236	0	.775	Idaho (1989-1996) Colorado State (1997-2022)
34	Marilyn McReavy Nolen#	33	809	392	12	.672	Sul Ross State (1969–1971), New Mexico State (1975), Utah State (1976–1981), Kentucky (1982–1983), Florida (1984–1990), North Florida (1991–1993), Saint Louis (1994–2003), Sul Ross State (2013)
35*	Travis Hudson	31	807	240	0	.771	Western Kentucky University (1995–present)
36	Lisa Herb	28	790	297	0	.727	Dubuque (1979–1984), Wisconsin–Eau Claire (1985–2006)
37	Bob Bertucci	39	788	471	0	.626	Army (1978), Tennessee (1979–86), Rutgers–Newark (1987–93), Temple (1994–2010), Lehigh (2011–2017)
38	Jill Hirschinger	40	781	569	10	.578	Drake (1979–83), Ferris State (1984–95), New Hampshire (1996–2018)
38	Carolyn Condit	44	781	610	0	.561	Xavier (1980–1983), Miami (Ohio) (1984–2023)
40	Rosie Wegrich#	44	780	592	10	.568	Minnesota (1975–1976), Arizona (1977–1991), Cal Poly–Pomona (1992–2018)
41*	Brenda Gray	41	776	590	0	.568	Sam Houston (1984–present)
42	Linda Dollar#	24	758	266	21	.735	Missouri State (1972–1995)
43	Sandy Hoffman#	32	758	366	0	.674	Bentley (1982–2013)
44	Matt Peck	32	751	340	0	.688	Wayne State (MI) (1984–94), North Alabama (1995–2003), Middle Tennessee (2004–2015)

== See also ==
- American Volleyball Coaches Association
- Volleyball Hall of Fame
