= Lisa Love (coach) =

American volleyball player-coach

Biographical details
- Education: Texas Tech University; North Texas State University

Playing career
- 1974–1977: Texas Tech

Coaching career (HC unless noted)
- 1982–1988: Texas–Arlington
- 1989–1998: USC

Administrative career (AD unless noted)
- 1991–2005: USC (associate AD)
- 2005–2012: Arizona State

Head coaching record
- Overall: 404–171

Accomplishments and honors

Awards
- AVCA Division I National Coach of the Year (1988); Pacific-10 Coach of the Year (1997)

Lisa Love is an American former volleyball coach and athletic director. She was the athletic director of Arizona State University. At the time, Love was one of only three female athletic directors in a Division I FBS Bowl Equity Conference of the NCAA. Love began her administrative career at USC. Prior to becoming an administrator, Love served as the volleyball head coach at the University of Texas at Arlington and the University of Southern California, leading her teams to the NCAA Division I Volleyball Tournament 13 times. In 2005, she was inducted into the American Volleyball Coaches Association (AVCA) Hall of Fame.

== Early years ==
Love was a four-year starter on the Texas Tech Red Raiders women's volleyball team while attending Texas Tech University, and graduated with a bachelor's degree in physical education in 1977. In 1985 Love received her master's degree in education administration from North Texas State University (now known as the University of North Texas).

== Career ==
=== Texas–Arlington ===
Love was named head coach of the Texas–Arlington Mavericks in 1982. During her seven seasons as head coach, Love compiled a 199–78 overall record, and was undefeated in regular season Southland Conference play. She was named Tachikara/AVCA Division I National Coach of the Year in 1988.

=== Southern California ===
Love became only the fourth head coach of the USC Trojans women's volleyball program in 1989. She held the position until 1998, and served as an associate athletic director from 1991 to 2001. From 2001 to 2005 Love held the position of senior associate athletics director. As head coach, she led the Trojans to a 205–93 record, nine NCAA Division I Volleyball Tournament berths and eight finishes in the national top 15. Love became associate athletic director in 1991, while still head coach of the volleyball team. Love was named Pac-10 Coach of the Year in 1998. She also served two stints as vice president of Pac-10 Conference, 1992-92 and 2001–2002. While at USC Love served as AVCA president from 1997 to 1998 and as the chair of the NCAA Division I Volleyball Committee.

=== Arizona State ===
Love was hired as the athletic director at Arizona State University, began her duties on July 1, 2005, and concluded her tenure on March 27, 2012. She was one of only three women to hold such a position within the continental United States. She served twice as vice president of the Pac-10, later Pac-12 Conference. Love represented the Pac-12 on both the NCAA Management Council and Leadership Council. At ASU Love was responsible for the management and development of the school's 22 sports programs.

== Head coaching record ==
Record table
Season	Team	Overall	Conference	Standing	Postseason
Texas–Arlington Mavericks (Southland Conference) (1982–1988)
1982	Texas–Arlington	29–17	5–0	1st	
1983	Texas–Arlington	29–20	3–0	1st (North)	
1984	Texas–Arlington	21–16	6–0	1st	
1985	Texas–Arlington	28–4	6–0	1st	NCAA first round
1986	Texas–Arlington	29–10	6–0	1st	NCAA regional semifinal
1987	Texas–Arlington	32–7	7–0	1st	NCAA regional semifinal
1988	Texas–Arlington	30–4	7–0	1st	NCAA Regional final
Texas–Arlington:		199–78	40–0	Reference:	
USC Trojans (Pacific-10 Conference) (1989–1998)
1989	USC	19–13	10–8	4th	NCAA first round
1990	USC	12–16	9–9	T–4th	
1991	USC	23–8	13–5	3rd	NCAA regional semifinal
1992	USC	21–9	12–6	3rd	NCAA regional semifinal
1993	USC	22–9	11–7	T–4th	NCAA second round
1994	USC	22–8	12–6	3rd	NCAA Regional final
1995	USC	18–9	11–7	T–4th	NCAA regional semifinal
1996	USC	21–9	12–6	T–3rd	NCAA regional semifinal
1997	USC	23–6	13–5	T–2nd	NCAA regional semifinal
1998	USC	24–6	16–2	2nd	NCAA regional semifinal
USC:		205–93	119–61	Reference:	
Total:		404–171			
National champion Postseason invitational champion Conference regular season champion Conference regular season and conference tournament champion Division regular season champion Division regular season and conference tournament champion Conference tournament champion
