= Mary Wise =

American college volleyball coach

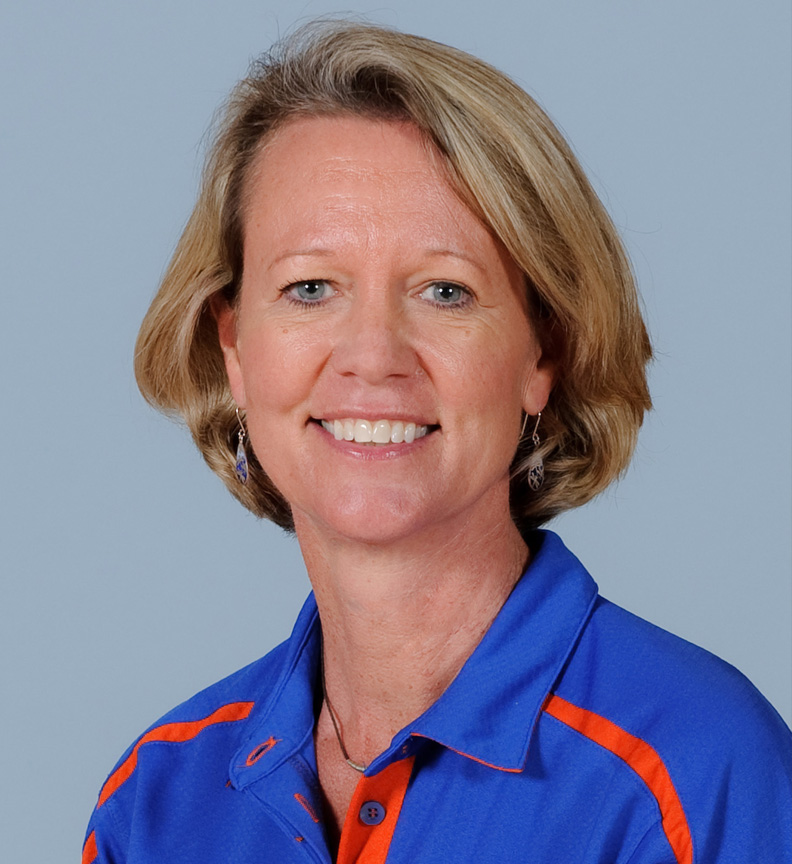

Biographical details
- Born: August 8, 1959 (age 67); Evanston, Illinois

Playing career
- 1977–1980: Purdue

Coaching career (HC unless noted)
- 1981–1984: Iowa State
- 1986–1990: Kentucky (assistant)
- 1991–2024: Florida

Head coaching record
- Overall: 1068–213

Accomplishments and honors

Championships
- 25x SEC Regular season (1991-2008, 2010, 2012, 2014, 2016, 2017, 2019, 2022) 8x NCAA Final Four (1992, 1993, 1996-1998, 2002, 2003, 2017)

Awards
- 13x SEC Coach of the Year (1991-1993, 1995, 1996, 1998, 1999-2002, 2007, 2014, 2017) 3x AVCA National Coach of the Year (1992, 1996, 2017)

Mary Wise (born August 8, 1959), née Mary Fischl, is a retired American college volleyball coach, former player and author. Wise was the head coach of the Florida Gators women's volleyball team of the University of Florida for 34 seasons. In Wise's career at Florida, her Gators teams won nineteen Southeastern Conference (SEC) regular season championships, and twelve SEC tournament titles. The Gators also made eight Final Four appearances in the NCAA Tournament, including an appearance in the 2003 and 2017 NCAA Championship finals. With 1,068 career coaching wins, Mary Wise has the most all-time Division I women's volleyball wins among female head coaches.

== Early years ==
Wise was born in Evanston, Illinois, in 1959. Her father Richard Fischl was a dentist, and her mother Lila managed his dental practice. Wise was one of six children.

== College career ==
Wise attended Purdue University in West Lafayette, Indiana, where she played for the Purdue Boilermakers volleyball team from 1977 to 1980. She was a standout setter, and was twice named to the All-Midwest Regional team, while the Boilermakers won two Big Ten Conference championships in 1979 and 1980. A dean's list student, she graduated from Purdue in 1981 with a bachelor's degree in physical education.

== Coaching career ==
=== Iowa State ===
Wise was 21 years old when she became the head coach of the Iowa State Cyclones volleyball team at Iowa State University in Ames, Iowa in 1981; she was also the youngest Division I coach in the history of the National Collegiate Athletic Association (NCAA). In four seasons as the Cyclones' head coach, she compiled a win–loss record of 81–63.

=== Kentucky ===
Wise had been out of coaching for a year and living in Kentucky in 1986, when she was offered an assistant coaching position on the Kentucky Wildcats women's volleyball staff at the University of Kentucky in Lexington, Kentucky. Wise rose from graduate assistant in 1986 to associate head coach in 1990. During those five seasons, the Wildcats won the SEC championship twice and advanced to the NCAA regional final once.

=== Florida ===
Wise was hired as the head coach of the Florida Gators volleyball team at the University of Florida in Gainesville, Florida in 1991. In the twenty seasons since then, her Gators teams won nineteen SEC regular season championships. She is one of only two coaches in conference history in any sport, men's or women's, to win as many as nineteen conference titles. From 1994 to 2004, the Gators did not lose a regular season SEC match—a feat unmatched by any school, ever.

In 2003, Wise's Florida team won 105 straight games during the course of the season, eclipsing the previous NCAA record by 36 games. This record has since been broken by Penn State who won 111 consecutive games. Since 1991, Florida has amassed 571 victories in matches—more than any other school in the nation.

Her expertise has led to numerous appointments on international coaching staffs. In the summer of 2004 Wise took her own team on a twelve-day, three-nation tour of Western Europe as the Gators faced several national and junior national teams. In May 2006, Wise guided the USA Volleyball A2 Team at the U.S. Open Championships as the volleyball community became one of the first groups to compete in a large-scale event in New Orleans since Hurricane Katrina.

Wise's Gators showed a commitment to playing an active role in community leadership and involvement. An annual tradition, each year members of the Gators volleyball team visit children at nearby UF Health Shands Hospital during the Thanksgiving holiday, while players also participate in the Goodwill Gators program. In 2003, Wise helped raise $7,500 for the Children's Miracle Network after more than 4,000 Gator fans packed the O'Connell Center for a match against South Carolina.

Wise picked up the number one recruiting class for the class of 2008, as she signed the Gatorade National Player of the Year and top recruit, Kelly Murphy, as well as five other recruits ranked in the top 50.

On February 6, 2025, Mary Wise announced her retirement from the University of Florida after 34 seasons.

=== Achievements and records ===
Wise became the first ever coach to win 100 straight games and was the first female coach to coach in the NCAA national championship final, as well as being the first female coach to coach in more than one NCAA Final Four. She became the first female coach in NCAA Division I history to win 15 conference titles in the first 15 seasons at one school, thus becoming the only coach to ever win 130 consecutive regular season conference matches. She is the first coach to ever win 90 percent of matches in the first 16 seasons at one school and she reached the 500 win plateau faster than any other Division I female coach.

== Awards and accolades ==
- Thirteen-time winner of the SEC Coach of the Year Award (1991–1993, 1995–1996, 1998–2002, co-winner in 2007, and 2014, co-winner in 2017)
- Three-time winner of American Volleyball Coaches Association National Coach of the Year (1992, 1996, 2017)
- American Volleyball Coaches Association All-Time Great Coach (2006)
- Past president of American Volleyball Coaches Association

== Personal ==
Wise lives in Gainesville, Florida with her husband, Mark Wise, and their two children, Matt and Mitchell.

== Coaching Record ==
Record table
Season	Team	Overall	Conference	Standing	Postseason
Iowa State (Big 8 Conference) (1981–1984)
1981	Iowa State	25–22			
1982	Iowa State	17–19			
1983	Iowa State	18–13			
1984	Iowa State	21–9			
Iowa State:		81–63 (.466)			
Florida Gators (Southeastern Conference) (1991–2024)
1991	Florida	35–5	15–3	T-1st	NCAA Regional final
1992	Florida	34–2	17–0	1st	NCAA National semifinal
1993	Florida	33–4	18–0	1st	NCAA National semifinal
1994	Florida	28–6	16–1	1st	NCAA regional semifinal
1995	Florida	35–2	17–0	1st	NCAA Regional final
1996	Florida	37–2	17–0	1st	NCAA National semifinal
1997	Florida	34–4	16–1	1st	NCAA National semifinal
1998	Florida	35–3	14–0	1st	NCAA National semifinal
1999	Florida	33–3	14–0	1st	NCAA Regional final
2000	Florida	29–5	14–0	1st	NCAA regional semifinal
2001	Florida	28–2	13–0	1st	NCAA Regional final
2002	Florida	34–3	16–0	1st	NCAA National semifinal
2003	Florida	36–2	16–0	1st	NCAA Runner Up
2004	Florida	28–5	15–1	T-1st	NCAA second round
2005	Florida	32–3	15–1	1st	NCAA Regional final
2006	Florida	30–3	19–1	1st	NCAA regional semifinal
2007	Florida	29–3	19–1	1st	NCAA regional semifinal
2008	Florida	27–4	18–2	1st	NCAA regional semifinal
2009	Florida	30–3	16–4	2nd	NCAA regional semifinal
2010	Florida	29–2	20–0	1st	NCAA regional semifinal
2011	Florida	27–6	17–3	2nd	NCAA Regional final
2012	Florida	27–5	19–1	1st	NCAA regional semifinal
2013	Florida	28–4	16–2	2nd	NCAA second round
2014	Florida	28–4	18–0	1st	NCAA Regional final
2015	Florida	25–7	13–5	4th	NCAA Regional final
2016	Florida	27–4	16–2	T-1st	NCAA second round
2017	Florida	30–2	17–1	T-1st	NCAA Runner Up
2018	Florida	26–7	15–3	3rd	NCAA regional semifinal
2019	Florida	27–5	16–2	T-1st	NCAA regional semifinal
2020	Florida	21–4	19–3	2nd	NCAA Regional final
2021	Florida	22–9	14–4	3rd	NCAA regional semifinal
2022	Florida	25–6	15–3	T-1st	NCAA regional semifinal
2023	Florida	19–10	10–8	5th	NCAA second round
2024	Florida	23–8	11–5	3rd	NCAA regional semifinal
Florida:		987–150 (.868)	522–57 (.902)		
Total:		1068–213 (.834)			
National champion Postseason invitational champion Conference regular season champion Conference regular season and conference tournament champion Division regular season champion Division regular season and conference tournament champion Conference tournament champion

== Bibliography ==
- Volleyball Drills for Champions. Human Kinetics Publishers (1998) ISBN 0-88011-778-8
- Volleyball Coaching Bible (Part IV: Individual Skills and Team Tactics, Chapter 13: Serving) ISBN 0-7360-3967-8

== Videos ==
- Foundations for Successful Volleyball (1999). ISBN 1-56404-351-7.

== See also ==
- Florida Gators
- History of the University of Florida
- List of college women's volleyball coaches with 700 wins
- List of Purdue University people
- University Athletic Association

== Bibliography ==
- Mary Wise, Volleyball Drills for Champions (1998). ISBN 0-88011-778-8.
