= Lisa Love =

Lisa Love may refer to:

- Lisa Love, American volleyball player and coach
- Lisa Love (born 1955), American journalist and model
