= Hayley Hodson =

American volleyball player

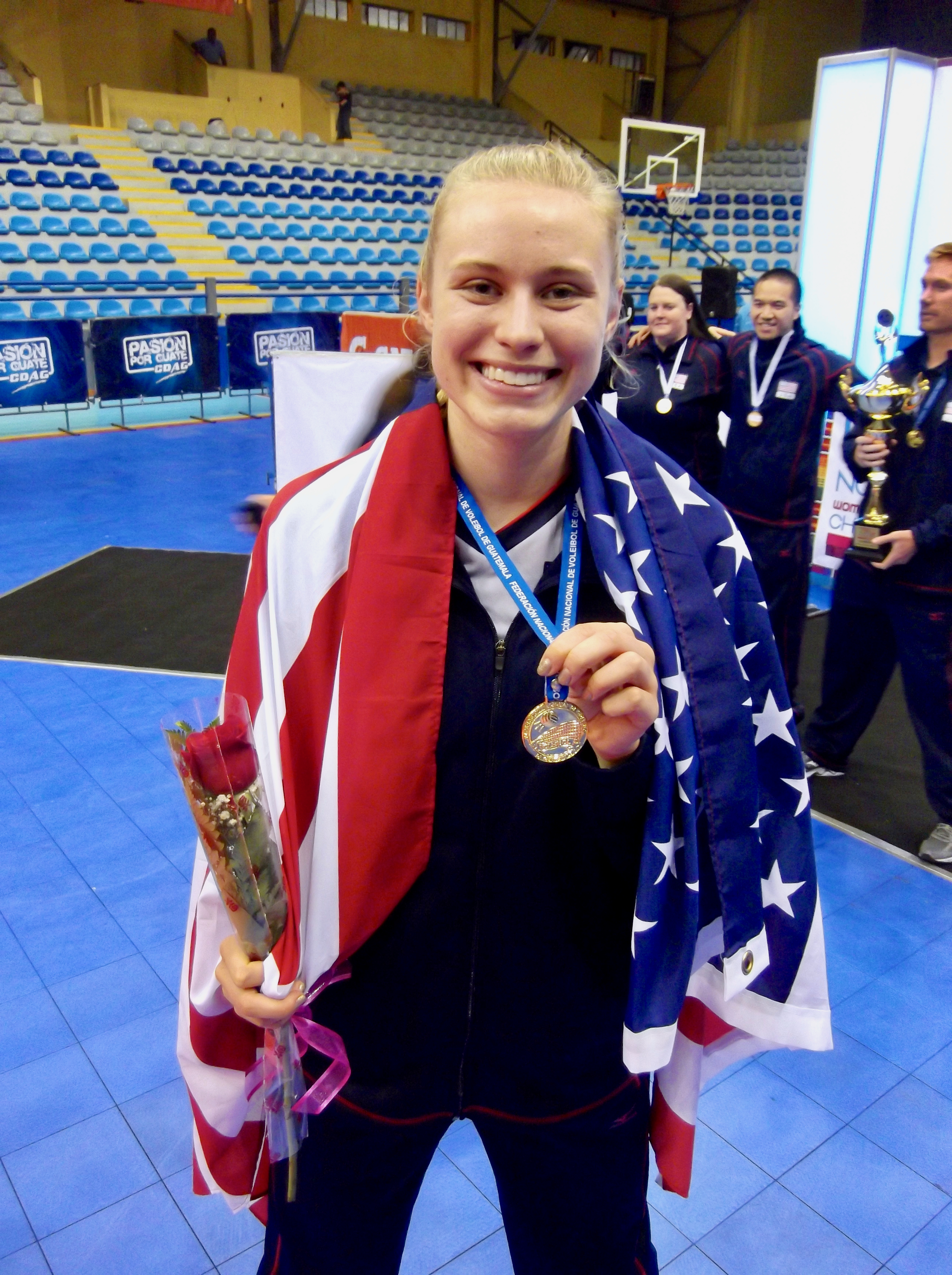
- Hodson in 2014

Personal information
- Full name: Hayley Claire Hodson
- Nationality: American
- Born: September 8, 1996 (age 30); Pasadena, California, U.S.
- Height: 6 ft 3 in (191 cm)
- Education: Stanford

Volleyball information
- Position: Outside hitter
Honours
Women's volleyball
Representing United States
NORCECA Championship
Gold medal – first place	2014 USA	Team

Hayley Claire Hodson (born September 8, 1996) is an American former volleyball player from Stanford University. She was listed as the number one college volleyball recruit by Volleyball magazine in April 2015, and was named National Freshmen of the year and All-American by the American Volleyball Coaches Association and Volleyball Magazine in the same year.

Hodson was a member of Team USA's Youth National, Junior National, and Women's National Volleyball teams during her high school years. After being diagnosed with post-concussion syndrome, she announced her medical retirement from volleyball in June 2017. In 2020, Hodson sued the NCAA and Stanford for damages and lost volleyball income.

Hodson's testimony was also instrumental in the unanimous passing of SB 206, the Fair Pay to Play Act in the State of California, authored by senators Nancy Skinner and Steve Bradford, which allowed NCAA student-athletes to own their own name, image, and likeness, and to be able to profit from such just like any other college student.
