= American Volleyball Coaches Association =

Organization of volleyball coaches in the United States

- Type: Private, non–profit
- Industry: Sports (Volleyball)
- Founded: October 26, 1981; 44 years ago
- Founder: Andy Banachowski; Terry Liskevych
- Headquarters: Lexington, Kentucky, United States
- Key people: Jaime Gordon (CEO); Jen Flynn Oldenburg (President)
- Number of employees: 9,000+ members
- Website: www.avca.org

The American Volleyball Coaches Association (AVCA) is an organization of over 9,000 members, incorporated as a private non-profit educational corporation in 1981, as the Collegiate Volleyball Coaches Association. It is currently headquartered in Lexington, Kentucky.

The original members of the AVCA were intercollegiate coaches who banded together to form this particular coaching body. In 1986, during the San Francisco convention, the membership recognized the growing and developing high school and club communities. The name of the association was then changed to reflect these growing constituencies. The original Collegiate Volleyball Coaches Association was renamed the American Volleyball Coaches Association with the intent of responding to and serving all volleyball coaches.

The organization also produces a weekly national poll for collegiate volleyball similar to how the Associated Press makes a poll for NCAA Division I Football Bowl Subdivision.

== History ==
Although incorporated as a non-profit in 1981, the AVCA began to grow and diversify, and a full-time executive director wasn't hired until July 1983. An associate director was hired in April 1986 and an administrative assistant in September 1988.

The Association moved from San Mateo, California, to Colorado Springs, Colorado, in August 1992. The staff has increased to the following positions: executive director, assistant executive director, director of operations, assistant director of events and public relations, manager of awards and membership, manager of communications, sales manager, and awards and membership specialist.

In 1986, the board was increased to 13 members, due to new membership increases averaging out at about 150 per year. In 1988, a boom of 106% new memberships occurred. Since 1986, high school membership has more than tripled. The AVCA has members in all 50 states and the District of Columbia, as well as, numerous international members. At the collegiate level, all major NCAA conferences are represented and membership among the club coaches has risen dramatically.

In July 2006 the association moved its headquarters to Lexington, Kentucky and entered into an association management partnership with Associations International (formally Host Communications then IMG College). The current president of the AVCA is Kirsten Bernthal Booth (head coach – Creighton). The Chief Executive Officer is Dr. Jaime Gordon and the Chief Operating Officer is Jason Jones.

== AVCA events ==
=== Beach volleyball championship ===
The beach volleyball championship was introduced to the women's collegiate scene by CBS College Sports with the Collegiate Nationals, an event founded by the network in the spring of 2006 to broadcast the national championships of several "action sports." The event was sponsored by the CBS College Sports Network, American Volleyball Coaches Association (AVCA) and the Association of Volleyball Professionals (AVP).

In 2006, the AVP sanctioned a combine that selected 8 players from 8 colleges and paired them into teams (title was won by Bibiana Candelas (USC)/Paula Gentil (Minnesota)). In 2007 Nebraska (Jordan Larson/Sarah Pavan) won an invitational competition of 8 colleges, which featured only two players per school, as opposed to entire teams. 2008 saw Texas win an invitational, sponsored by AVCA and AVP, involving 6 schools with four doubles squads each. In 2009, USC prevailed over an invited field of 8 colleges with four doubles squads each. In 2010, the competition reverted to one doubles squad per school, with 12 colleges invited; it was won by Loyola Marymount (Emily Day/Heather Hughes). The two-player team format continued in 2011, except that players were paired with different partners from other schools for every match, until the semi-final winners were determined. That year there was also a men's competition in the same format.

In 2010 the NCAA categorized women's beach volleyball as an "emerging sport." Beginning in the spring of 2012 the AVCA began sponsoring a national championship tournament for women's collegiate beach volleyball. The AVCA has separate brackets for teams and for individual pairs. The champions of the team tournaments are:

- 2012 – Pepperdine
- 2013 – Long Beach State
- 2014 – Pepperdine
- 2015 – USC

The NCAA granted full sponsorship to beach volleyball in all three NCAA divisions, with the first NCAA championship being held in May, 2016.

=== AVCA Showcase tournament ===
From 1995 to 2012, the AVCA put on an annual tournament held in the beginning of each season, called the AVCA Showcase. Through 2011, four teams, usually ranked in the top 15, competed for the AVCA Showcase title. As of 2007, the showcase champion had gone on to the NCAA Final Four 10 times out of 13. The only time the winner failed to advance to the Final Four was Colorado State in 2000, Texas in 2006 and Nebraska in 2007. However, only twice has the showcase champion won the NCAA Championship: Long Beach State in 1998 and Southern California in 2003.

In 2012, the Showcase featured four collegiate teams competing in one match each against the Chinese Volleyball League champion, Jiangsu.

Past sponsors include NACWAA, Runza Restaurants, Rockvale Outlets and State Farm.

Both Big West volleyball and Big Ten Conference volleyball have been prominently featured in this tournament throughout the years.

== AVCA Awards ==
Given out annually for Division I, II, and III women and Division I/II (combined) and III for men, the following is a list of past awards for both men and women.

=== National Coach of the Year – Women's teams ===
==== Key ====
†	AVCA Hall of Fame member
*	Won NCAA championship same year

==== List of winners ====
Division I National Coach of the Year
Year	Image	Name	School
1982		Dave Shoji*†	Hawai'i
1983		Taras Liskevych†	Pacific
1984		Leilani Overstreet	Fresno State
1985		Mike Hebert†	Illinois
1986		Terry Pettit†	Nebraska
1987		Kathy DeBoer†	Kentucky
1988		Lisa Love†	UTSA
1989		Andy Banachowski†	UCLA
1990	Russ Rose	Russ Rose†	Penn State
1991		Don Shaw†	Stanford
1992	Mary Wise	Mary Wise	Florida
1993		Kathy Gregory	UCSB
1994		Terry Pettit†	Nebraska
1995		Chuck Erbe†	Michigan State
1996	Mary Wise	Mary Wise	Florida
1997	Russ Rose	Russ Rose†	Penn State
1998		Brian Gimmillaro*†	Long Beach State
1999		Iradge Ahrabi-Fard†	Northern Iowa
2000	John Cook	John Cook*†	Nebraska
2001	John Dunning	John Dunning*†	Stanford
2002		Bobbi Petersen	Northern Iowa
2003	Mick Haley	Mick Haley*†	USC
2004	Jim McLaughlin	Jim McLaughlin†	Washington
2005	John Cook	John Cook†	Nebraska
2006		Andy Banachowski†	UCLA
2007; 2008	Russ Rose	Russ Rose**†	Penn State
2009		Dave Shoji†	Hawai'i
2010		Rich Feller	California
2011		Michael Sealy*	UCLA
2012		Jerritt Elliott*	Texas
2013	Russ Rose	Russ Rose*†	Penn State
2014		Shawn Olmstead	BYU
2015	Hugh McCutcheon	Hugh McCutcheon	Minnesota
2016	John Dunning	John Dunning*†	Stanford
2017	Mary Wise	Mary Wise	Florida
2018		Heather Olmstead	BYU
2019		Ryan McGuyre	Baylor
2020		Craig Skinner*	Kentucky
2021	Dani Busboom Kelly	Dani Busboom Kelly	Louisville
2022		Jennifer Petrie	San Diego
2023	John Cook	John Cook†	Nebraska
2024		Dan Fisher	Pittsburgh
2025	Jamie Morrison	Jamie Morrison*	Texas A&M

==== Winners by school ====
Penn State and Nebraska lead all schools with 5 winners. Stanford, UCLA, and Florida have 3 winners each. Hawai'i, Kentucky, BYU, and Northern Iowa follow with 2 winners each, while the remaining schools have had 1 winner.

School	Winners	Year(s)	Winning Coach(es)
Penn State	5	1990, 1997, 2007, 2008, 2013	Russ Rose (1990, 1997, 2007, 2008, 2013)
Nebraska	5	1986, 1994, 2000, 2005, 2023	Terry Pettit (1986, 1994); John Cook (2000, 2005, 2023)
Florida	3	1992, 1996, 2017	Mary Wise (1992, 1996, 2017)
Stanford	3	1991, 2001, 2016	Don Shaw (1991); John Dunning (2001, 2016)
UCLA	3	1989, 2006, 2011	Andy Banachowski (1989, 2006); Michael Sealy (2011)
BYU	2	2014, 2018	Shawn Olmstead (2014); Heather Olmstead (2018)
Hawai'i	2	1982, 2009	Dave Shoji (1982, 2009)
Kentucky	2	1987, 2020	Kathy DeBoer (1987); Craig Skinner (2020)
Northern Iowa	2	1999, 2002	Iradge-Ahrabi Fard (1999); Bobbi Peterson (2002)
Baylor	1	2019	Ryan McGuyre (2019)
California	1	2010	Rich Feller (2010)
Fresno State	1	1984	Leilani Overstreet (1984)
Illinois	1	1985	Mike Hebert (1985)
Long Beach State	1	1998	Brian Gimmillaro (1998)
Louisville	1	2021	Dani Busboom Kelly (2021)
Michigan State	1	1995	Chuck Erbe (1995)
Minnesota	1	2015	Hugh McCutcheon (2015)
Pacific	1	1983	Taras Liskevych (1983)
Pittsburgh	1	2024	Dan Fisher (2024)
San Diego	1	2022	Jennifer Petrie (2022)
Texas	1	2012	Jerritt Elliott (2012)
Texas A&M	1	2025	Jamie Morrison (2025)
UCSB	1	1993	Kathy Gregory (1993)
USC	1	2003	Mick Haley (2003)
UTSA	1	1988	Lisa Love (1988)
Washington	1	2004	Jim McLaughlin (2004)

=== National Assistant Coach of the Year – Women's teams ===
The AVCA began awarding the Division I National Assistant Coach of the Year in 2009.

- 2025: Kathy Jewell, Purdue
- 2024: Brian Rosen, Creighton
- 2023: Kellen Petrone, Pittsburgh
- 2022: Dan Meske, Louisville
- 2021: Brittany Dildine, Wisconsin
- 2020: Leslie Gabriel, Washington
- 2019: Angie Oxley Behrens, Creighton
- 2018: Burdette Greeny, Washington State
- 2017: Lindsey Gray-Walton, Kentucky
- 2016: Dani Busboom Kelly, Nebraska
- 2015: Laura "Bird" Kuhn, Kansas
- 2014: Eva Rackham, North Carolina
- 2013: Salima Rockwell, Texas
- 2012: Denise Corlett, Stanford
- 2011: Holly Watts, Florida State
- 2010: Denise Corlett, Stanford
- 2009: Kelly Files, Oklahoma

=== National Player of the Year – Women's ===
Since 1985, the AVCA has recognized the Division I national player(s) of the year.

==== Key ====
†	Honda-Broderick Cup Award Winner
*	Won NCAA championship same year

==== List of winners ====
Division I National Player of the Year
Year	Image	Name	School
1985		Kim Oden	Stanford
1986		Mariliisa Salmi	BYU
1987		Teee Williams*	Hawaiʻi
1988		Tara Cross	Long Beach State
1989		Teee Williams	Hawaiʻi
1989		Tara Cross*	Long Beach State
1990		Beverly Oden	Stanford
1991		Antoinnette White	Long Beach State
1992		Natalie Williams	UCLA
1993		Danielle Scott*	Long Beach State
1994		Laura Davis	Ohio State
1995		Cary Wendell	Stanford
1995		Allison Weston*	Nebraska
1996		Angelica Ljungquist	Hawaiʻi
1997; 1998		Misty May†*	Long Beach State
1999		Kerri Walsh	Stanford
1999		Lauren Cacciamani*	Penn State
2000		Greichaly Cepero*	Nebraska
2001; 2002		Logan Tom*	Stanford
2003		Kim Willoughby	Hawaiʻi
2004		Stacey Gordon	Ohio State
2004		Ogonna Nnamani†*	Stanford
2005		Christina Houghtelling	Nebraska
2006		Sarah Pavan*†	Nebraska
2007		Foluke Akinradewo	Stanford
2008		Nicole Fawcett*	Penn State
2009		Megan Hodge*†	Penn State
2010		Carli Lloyd	California
2011		Alex Jupiter	USC
2012		Alaina Bergsma	Oregon
2013		Krista Vansant	Washington
2014		Micha Hancock*	Penn State
2015		Samantha Bricio	USC
2016		Sarah Wilhite	Minnesota
2017; 2018		Kathryn Plummer*	Stanford
2019		Yossiana Pressley	Baylor
2020		Madison Lilley*	Kentucky
2021		Dana Rettke*	Wisconsin
2022		Logan Eggleston*	Texas
2023		Sarah Franklin	Wisconsin
2024; 2025		Olivia Babcock	Pittsburgh

==== Winners by school ====
Stanford leads all universities with 10 total selections (three co selections), followed by Long Beach State with 6 selections (one co), Nebraska, Penn State, and Hawai'i each have 4 selections. Ohio State (one co), Southern California, and Pittsburgh each have 2, while the remaining schools have had 1 winner.

School	Winners	Year(s)	Winning Player(s)
Stanford	10	1985, 1990, 1995 (co), 1999 (co), 2001, 2002, 2004 (co), 2007, 2017, 2018	Kim Oden (1985); Bev Oden (1990); Cary Wendell (1995); Kerri Walsh (1999); Logan Tom (2001, 2002); Ogonna Nnamani (2004); Foluke Akinradewo (2007); Kathryn Plummer (2017, 2018)
Long Beach State	6	1988, 1989 (co), 1991, 1993, 1997, 1998	Tara Cross (1988, 1989); Antoinnette White (1991); Danielle Scott (1993); Misty May (1997, 1998)
Hawaiʻi	4	1987, 1989 (co), 1996, 2003	Teee Williams (1987, 1989); Angelica Ljungquist (1996); Kim Willoughby (2003)
Nebraska	4	1995 (co), 2000, 2005, 2006	Allison Weston (1995); Greichaly Cepero (2000); Christina Houghtelling (2005); Sarah Pavan (2006)
Penn State	4	1999 (co), 2008, 2009, 2014	Lauren Cacciamani (1999); Nicole Fawcett (2008); Megan Hodge (2009); Micha Hancock (2014)
Ohio State	2	1994, 2004 (co)	Laura Davis (1994); Stacey Gordon (2004)
Pittsburgh	2	2024, 2025	Olivia Babcock (2024, 2025)
USC	2	2011, 2015	Alex Jupiter (2011); Samantha Bricio (2015)
Wisconsin	2	2021, 2023	Dana Rettke (2021); Sarah Franklin (2023)
Baylor	1	2019	Yossiana Pressley (2019)
BYU	1	1986	Marilissa Salmi (1986)
California	1	2010	Carli Lloyd (2010)
Kentucky	1	2020	Madison Lilley (2020)
Minnesota	1	2016	Sarah Wilhite (2016)
Oregon	1	2012	Alaina Bergsma (2012)
Texas	1	2022	Logan Eggleston (2022)
UCLA	1	1992	Natalie Williams (1992)
Washington	1	2013	Krista Vansant (2013)

=== National Freshman of the Year – Women's ===
Since 2001, the AVCA has recognized the Division I freshman player(s) of the year.

==== Key ====
†	Went on to win AVCA National Player of the Year during career

==== List of winners ====
Division I National Freshman of the Year
Year	Image	Name	School
2001		Stacey Gordon†	Ohio State
2002		Kim Glass	Arizona
2003		Kanoe Kamana'o	Hawai'i
2004		Sarah Pavan†	Nebraska
2005		Nicole Fawcett†	Penn State
2006		Megan Hodge†	Penn State
2007		Juliann Faucette	Texas
2008		Kelly Murphy	Florida
2009		Lauren Cook	UCLA
2010		Deja McClendon	Penn State
2011		Haley Eckerman	Texas
2012		Ziva Recek	Florida
2013		Ebony Nwanebu	USC
2014		Ali Frantti	Penn State
2015		Hayley Hodson	Stanford
2016		Kathryn Plummer†	Stanford
2017		Dana Rettke†	Wisconsin
2018		Heather Gneiting	BYU
2019		Magda Jehlárová	Washington State
2020		Emily Londot	Ohio State
2021		Lexi Rodriguez	Nebraska
2022		Mimi Colyer	Oregon
2023		Olivia Babcock†	Pittsburgh
2024		Izzy Starck	Penn State
2025		Kassie O'Brien	Kentucky

==== Winners by school ====
Penn State leads all universities with 5 selections, followed by Stanford, Florida, Nebraska, Ohio State, and Texas who each have 2 selections. The remaining schools have had 1 winner.

School	Winners	Year(s)	Winning Player(s)
Penn State	5	2005, 2006, 2010, 2014, 2024	Nicole Fawcett (2005); Megan Hodge (2006); Deja McClendon (2010); Ali Frantti (2014); Izzy Starck (2024)
Florida	2	2008, 2012	Kelly Murphy (2008); Ziva Recek (2012)
Nebraska	2	2004, 2021	Sarah Pavan (2004); Lexi Rodriguez (2021)
Ohio State	2	2001, 2020	Stacey Gordon (2001); Emily Londot (2020)
Stanford	2	2015, 2016	Hayley Hodson (2015); Kathryn Plummer (2016)
Texas	2	2007, 2011	Juliann Faucette (2007); Haley Eckerman (2011)
Arizona	1	2002	Kim Glass (2002)
BYU	1	2018	Heather Gneiting (2018)
Hawaiʻi	1	2003	Kanoe Kamana'o (2003)
Oregon	1	2022	Mimi Colyer (2022)
Pittsburgh	1	2023	Olivia Babcock (2023)
UCLA	1	2009	Lauren Cook (2009)
USC	1	2013	Ebony Nwanebu (2013)
Washington State	1	2019	Magda Jehlárová (2019)
Wisconsin	1	2017	Dana Rettke (2017)
Kentucky	1	2025	Kassie O'Brien (2025)

=== Positional Awards – women's ===
In 2025, the AVCA announced they will begin awarding positional awards in addition to the historical National Freshman, Coach, and Player of the Year Awards.

Year	Setter of the Year		Outside Hitter of the Year		Middle Blocker of the Year		Opposite Hitter of the Year		Libero of the Year	
Year	Player	University	Player	University	Player	University	Player	University	Player	University
2025	Bergen Reilly	Nebraska	Mimi Colyer	Wisconsin	Andi Jackson	Nebraska	Olivia Babcock	Pittsburgh	Rachel Van Gorp	Iowa State

=== National Coach of the Year – Men's teams ===
For Division I/II men. Stanford (1991–92) and Penn State (2007–08) are the only schools in which both the men and women teams' coaches won the award in the same academic year.

- 2026: Mike Iandolo, Ball State
- 2025: Nickie Sanlin, McKendree
- 2024: Matt Werle, Grand Canyon
- 2023: John Speraw, UCLA
- 2022: Donan Cruz, Ball State
- 2021: Rick McLaughlin, UCSB
- 2020: No award given due to the COVID-19 pandemic
- 2019: Charlie Wade, Hawai'i
- 2018: Alan Knipe, Long Beach State
- 2017: Alan Knipe, Long Beach State
- 2016: Pete Hanson, Ohio State
- 2015: Dan Friend, Lewis
- 2014: Shane Davis, Loyola–Chicago
- 2013: Chris McGown, BYU
- 2012: Bill Ferguson, USC
- 2011: Pete Hanson/David Kniffen Ohio State/UC Irvine
- 2010: John Kosty, Stanford
- 2009: Bill Ferguson, USC
- 2008: Mark Pavlik, Penn State
- 2007: Arnie Ball, IPFW
- 2006: John Speraw, UC Irvine
- 2005: Marv Dunphy, Pepperdine
- 2004: Alan Knipe, Long Beach State
- 2003: Dave Deuser, Lewis
- 2002: Mike Wilton, Hawai'i
- 2001: Carl McGown, BYU
- 2000: Pete Hanson, Ohio State
- 1999: Carl McGown, BYU
- 1998: Al Scates, UCLA
- 1997: Ruben Nieves, Stanford
- 1996: Al Scates, UCLA
- 1995: Don Shondell, Ball State
- 1994: Tom Peterson, Penn State
- 1993: Al Scates, UCLA
- 1992: Ruben Nieves, Stanford
- 1991: Ray Ratelle, Long Beach State

=== National Player of the Year – Men's ===
Long Beach State, Hawai'i, Penn State, Stanford, BYU, UCLA and Ohio State are the only universities in which a male and female volleyball player was named the AVCA NPOY. Long Beach State leads with seven selections, Pepperdine with six, followed by Hawai'i with five and UCLA with four.

- 2026: Andrew Rowan (UCLA)
- 2025: Moni Nikolov (Long Beach State)
- 2024: Hilir Henno (UC Irvine)
- 2023: Jakob Thelle (Hawai'i)
- 2022: Alex Nikolov (Long Beach State)
- 2021: Rado Parapunov (Hawai'i)
- 2020: Gabi Garcia Fernandez (BYU)
- 2019: T.J. DeFalco (Long Beach State)
- 2018: Joshua Tuaniga (Long Beach State)
- 2017: T.J. DeFalco (Long Beach State)
- 2016: Nicolas Szerszeń (Ohio State)
- 2015: Thomas Jaeschke (Loyola-Chicago)
- 2014: Taylor Sander (BYU)
- 2013: Taylor Crabb (Long Beach State)
- 2012: Tony Ciarelli (USC)
- 2011: Murphy Troy (USC)
- 2010: Kawika Shoji (Stanford)
- 2009: Paul Carroll (Pepperdine)
- 2008: Matt Anderson (Penn State); Paul Lotman (Long Beach State)
- 2007: Jonathan Winder (Pepperdine)
- 2006: Jayson Jablonsky (UC Irvine)
- 2005: Sean Rooney (Pepperdine)
- 2004: Carlos Moreno (Brigham Young University)
- 2003: Costas Theocharidis (Hawai’i)
- 2002: Brad Keenan (Pepperdine)
- 2001: Costas Theocharidis (Hawai’i)
- 2000: Donald Suxho (USC)
- 1999: George Roumain (Pepperdine)
- 1998: George Roumain (Pepperdine)
- 1997: Ivan Contreras (Penn State)
- 1996: Yuval Katz (Hawai’i), Stein Metzger (UCLA)
- 1995: Jeff Nygaard (UCLA)
- 1994: Jeff Nygaard (UCLA)
- 1993: Canyon Ceman (Stanford)
- 1992: Brent Hilliard (Long Beach State)
- 1991: Bryan Ivie (USC)

=== West Region Coach of the Year – Women ===
- 1993: David Rubio (coach) (University of Arizona)

=== National High School Coach of the Year ===
- 2024 – James Ward (Mount St. Mary High School, Oklahoma City, OK) and Marty Woods (Dalton McMichael High School, Mayodan, NC)
- 2023 – Stephanie Gibson (Winter Park High School, Winter Park, FL) and Brian Wheatley (Venice High School, Venice, FL)
- 2022 – Suzanne Marble (La Conner High School, La Conner, WA) and Diana Kramer (New Bremen High School, New Breman, OH)
- 2021 – Mayssa Cook (Bloomfield Hills Marian High School, Marian, MI) and Sue Ziegler (Lincoln Lutheran High School, Lincoln, NE)
- 2020 – Renee Saunders (Skutt Catholic High School, Omaha, NE) and Loretta Vogel (Mercy High School, Farmington Hills, MI)
- 2019 – Margie McGee (Valley View High School, Jonesboro, AR) and Ann Schilling (Bayside Academy, Daphne, AL)
- 2018 – Zoe Bell (Ardrey Kell High School, Charlotte, NC) and Heath Kufahl (Christian Heritage Academy, Del City, OK)
- 2017 – Alexis Glover and Zack Young
- 2016 – Jeni Case (Ursuline Academy, Cincinnati, OH) and Jan Barker, Amarillo High School, Amarillo, TX)
- 2015 – Nancy Dorsey (St. James Academy, Lenexa, KS) and Jean Kesterson (Cathedral High School, Indianapolis, IN)
- 2014 – Al Bennett (Westlake High School, Austin, TX) and Angie Spangenberg (Harlan Community High School, Harlan, IA)
- 2013 – Kim Lauwers (A.J. Dimond High School, Anchorage, AK) and Jody DeGroot (Bellarmine Preparatory School, Tacoma, WA)
- 2012 – Suzie Pignetti (Charlotte Latin School, Charlotte, NC) and Ron Kordes (Assumption High School, Louisville, KY)
- 2011 – Jeff Carroll (Billings Senior High School, Billings, MT) and Susan Brewer (Bellville High School, Bellville, TX)
- 2010 – Bill Morrin (Grantsburg High School, Grantsburg, WI) and Amy Steininger (Marion Local High School, Maria Stein, OH)
- 2009 – Bret Almazan-Cezar (Archbishop Mitty High School, Santa Clara, CA) and Anita Boeck (Arlington High School, Arlington, SD)
- 2008 – Todd Garvey (Mercy Academy, Louisville, KY) and Tom Turco (Barnstable High School, Hyannis, MA)
