= Greichaly Cepero =

Puerto Rican volleyball player

Personal information
- Nationality: Puerto Rico
- Born: June 11, 1981 (age 45); Río Piedras, Puerto Rico
- Height: 6 ft 2 in (1.88 m)

Volleyball information
- Position: Setter

Greichaly Cepero (born June 11, 1981) is a volleyball player who played collegiately for Nebraska.

== Early life ==
Cepero was born June 11, 1981, to Pedro Cepero and Maria Juan Febres in Río Piedras, Puerto Rico. Her name came from "Greicha," which means Greece in Puerto Rican, because her father hoped she would one day play in the Olympics. She played both basketball and volleyball at McDonogh School in Owings Mills, Maryland. In volleyball she helped lead McDonogh to an undefeated season, which resulted in a No. 25 national ranking by USA Today.

== College ==
Several schools, including Rice, Connecticut, UCLA and Nebraska recruited Cepero; she chose Nebraska. She played volleyball all four years and basketball for three years. She was a setter in volleyball, and at 6′2″, she was also a strong blocker. She won the AVCA player of the year in 2000, was a three time All-American. She helped lead the team to the National Championship in 2000, where she was named the tournament's Most Outstanding Player. In 2001, she was the winner of the Honda Sports Award, given to the nation's top female collegiate volleyball player.

== Honors and awards ==
- Gatorade Circle of Champions Maryland High School Volleyball Player-of-the-Year Award
- American Volleyball Coaches Association Player of the Year (2000)
- Honda Sports Award for volleyball (2001)

== See also ==
- Nebraska Cornhuskers women's volleyball
