= David Rubio (coach) =

American volleyball coach and player (born 1959)

Biographical details
- Born: June 20, 1959 (age 66); United States

Coaching career (HC unless noted)
- 1988–1991: Cal State Bakersfield
- 1992–present: Arizona

Accomplishments and honors

Championships
- NCAA Division II Champion (1989)

Awards
- Pac-10 Coach of the Year (2000); AVCA West Region Coach of the Year (1993)

David Rubio (born June 20, 1959) is an American volleyball coach and former player. He is currently the head women's volleyball coach for the University of Arizona Wildcats, a position he has held for 25 years, since 1992. Rubio was previously head coach at the Cal State Bakersfield, where he led the women's volleyball team to their first national championship in 1989. Rubio leads all active coaches in all conferences with 459 victories. He has led the Wildcats to 18 NCAA appearances and compiled a record of 12, 20-win seasons. Rubio was honored as Pac-10 Coach of the Year in 2000, while leading the University of Arizona to its first Pac-10 championship, and he was named the American Volleyball Coaches Association West Region Coach of the Year in 1993.
