= Olivia Babcock =

American Collegiate Volleyball Player

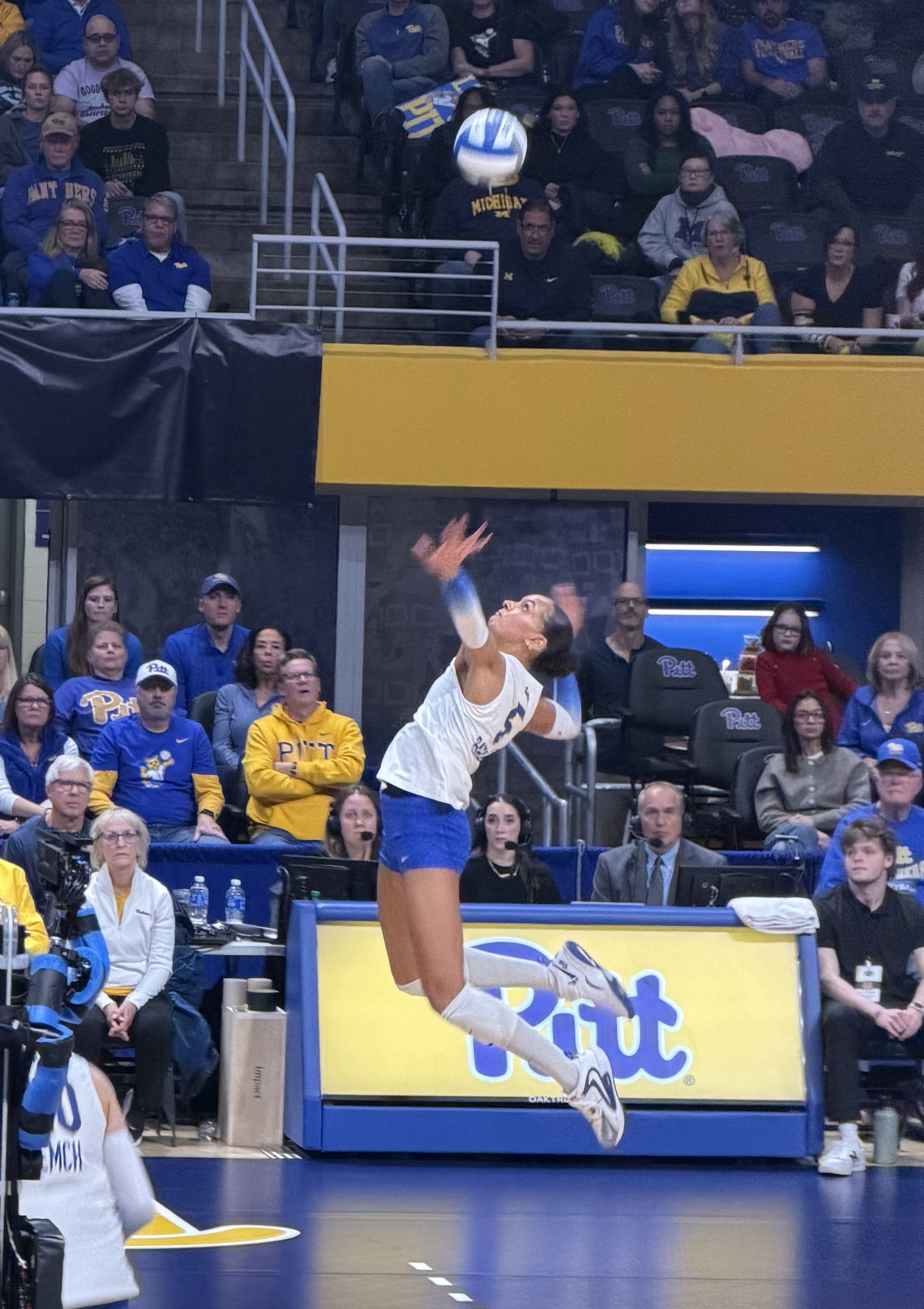
- Olivia Babcock at the 2025 NCAA 2nd Round

Personal information
- Nationality: United States
- Born: June 28, 2005 (age 21)
- Home town: Los Angeles, California, U.S.
- Education: Pittsburgh (2023-present)
- Height: 6 ft 4 in (193 cm)

Volleyball information
- Position: Opposite

Olivia Babcock (born June 28, 2005) is an American collegiate volleyball player who currently plays for the Pittsburgh Panthers women's volleyball team. She was named the AVCA National Freshman of the Year in 2023 and the AVCA National Player of the Year in 2024 and 2025. She was also named the ACC Freshman of the Year in 2023 the ACC Player of the Year in 2024 and 2025., and the ACC Female Player of the Year in 2026 becoming the first volleyball player to win this award.

== Early life ==
Babcock is from Los Angeles, California and is the daughter of Dave and Katrina Babcock. She has a twin sister and two step-brothers. She played as a goalkeeper in both soccer and water polo, and started playing club volleyball at the age of 15 before she transitioned to solely playing volleyball at the age of 16.

She was ranked as the No. 43 recruit by PrepVolleyball.com and No. 27 by PrepDig.com before committing to play at the University of Pittsburgh. She led her high school, Sierra Canyon's volleyball team to its first Division 1 girls volleyball championship. She played club volleyball at Sunshine Volleyball Club.

== Collegiate Career ==
=== Freshman Season (2023) ===
In her freshman season, Babcock played in and started all 34 matches for the Pitt Panthers and led the team in points, kills, and aces. During the season, she was honored six times as ACC Freshman of the Week and once as AVCA National Player of the Week. She led the Panthers to a co-ACC championship and to the National Semifinal, where they lost to Nebraska.

She was named to the All-ACC First Team, All-ACC Freshman Team, and AVCA First Team All-American. She became the program's first-ever AVCA National Freshman of the Year and the program's first-ever ACC Freshman of the Year.

=== Sophomore Season (2024) ===
In her sophomore season, Babcock recorded 538 kills, setting a 25-point scoring era individual season record. She recorded two triple-doubles and set a program record with 12 aces in a single match. She also broke the all-time individual single-season record with 71 aces, surpassing a record previously set in 1989.

She led the Panthers to another ACC Championship and to the National Semifinal, where they lost to rival Louisville. During the season, she was named ACC Offensive Player of the Week three times and AVCA National Player of the Week twice.

She was named the ACC Player of the Year, AVCA First Team All-American, and the program's first AVCA National Player of the Year. She was also awarded the 2025 Honda Sport Award for Volleyball and was nominated for an ESPY Award for Best Female College Athlete.

=== Junior Season (2025) ===
In her junior season, Babcock broke the program record for kills with 41 against Louisville in the regular season. She broke her own record two weeks later with 45 kills against the University of North Carolina. She was named AVCA Player of the Week once and ACC Offensive Player of the Week five times. She led the Panthers to the team's fifth consecutive national semifinal on December 18, 2025, where they were swept by eventual champions Texas A&M in three sets. Babcock led all players in the match with 22 kills and six blocks.

She was named the ACC Player of the Year for the second time, becoming the first player in program history to win the award twice. On December 19, 2025, she was named the AVCA National Player of the Year for the second consecutive season, making her only the fifth player in the award's history to win back-to-back honors. She also received the inaugural AVCA Rightside Hitter of the Year award. For the second consecutive year she won the Honda Sports Award for volleyball.

=== Senior Season (2026) ===
In her senior season, Babcock broke the program record for career service aces and career kills against SMU during the regular season.

== International Career ==
Babcock made her national team debut in 2023, winning gold at the Girls U19 Pan American Cup. In 2024, she competed with the national team at the NORCECA Women's Pan American Cup Final Six, where the team won silver.

Babcock was one of two active NCAA volleyball players to play for the United States Senior National Volleyball Team in the 2025 Volleyball Nations League, where the team finished in sixth place.
