= John Dunning (volleyball) =

American volleyball coach (born 1950)

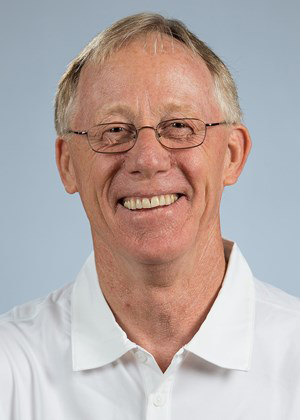

Biographical details
- Born: November 6, 1950 (age 75); Reno, Nevada, U.S.

Coaching career (HC unless noted)
- 1985–2000: Pacific (CA)
- 2001–2016: Stanford

Head coaching record
- Overall: 888–185

Accomplishments and honors

Championships
- 5 NCAA Division I (1985–1986, 2001, 2004, 2016)

John Dunning (born November 6, 1950) is an American former volleyball coach who was the head women's coach at Stanford University (2001–2016) and the University of the Pacific (1985–2000). In 32 seasons of collegiate coaching, he guided his teams to five NCAA Division I women's volleyball tournament championships —second most of any Division I women's volleyball coach – and compiled an overall record of 888–185 (.828). He is one of only two Division I college volleyball coaches to have won NCAA championships at two different schools.

== Early years ==
Dunning earned a Bachelor of Arts in mathematics and economics from San Diego State University in 1973. He didn't play volleyball, but came to the sport first as a high school coach. Before taking the position at the University of the Pacific, Dunning taught math and coached both basketball and volleyball at Fremont High School in Sunnyvale, California. His volleyball teams compiled a record of 283–32 (.898) and won six CIF-Central Coast Section championships as well as a California state championship (1980).

In 1980, Dunning founded Bay Club, a USA Volleyball junior club. His 17-and-under team won the national championship at USA Volleyball Nationals in 1984.

== College coaching ==
=== Pacific (CA) ===
At the University of the Pacific (OUP), Dunning led the Tigers to two NCAA championships (1985, 1986), a runner-up national finish (1990), five Big West Conference championships and 16 consecutive NCAA tournament appearances, where his teams compiled a postseason record of 43–15.

Dunning was named Big West Coach of the Year four times while at UOP and was inducted into the University of the Pacific Hall of Fame in 2007. He coached 16 All Americans at UOP, including two-time Olympian Elaina Oden and 2008 Olympian Jennifer Joines.

=== Stanford ===
In 16 seasons as Stanford's head coach, Dunning guided the Cardinal to three NCAA championships (2001, 2004, 2016), a 58–13 record in the NCAA tournament and seven national championship match appearances. He was inducted into the AVCA Hall of Fame in 2011, chosen the AVCA National Coach of the Year in 2001 and 2016 and shares the NCAA Division I record for coaching in the most women's volleyball championship matches (10) with Penn State coach Russ Rose. Dunning announced his retirement on January 9, 2017.

Dunning coached 52 AVCA All Americans at Stanford, including four-time Olympian Logan Tom, who was a two-time AVCA National Player of the Year at Stanford, two-time Olympian Ogonna Nnamani, winner of the Honda-Broderick Cup in 2004 as the NCAA's top female athlete, and two-time Olympian Foluke Akinradewo, the AVCA Player of the Year in 2007 and the “Best Middle Blocker” at the 2016 Summer Olympics in Rio de Janeiro.

=== Coaching education ===
In 2011, Dunning partnered with three-time USA Olympic volleyball coach Terry Liskevych and Penn State University women's volleyball coach Russ Rose to create The Art of Coaching Volleyball (AOCVB), an educational organization that teaches coaching methodology through clinics and online resources. Since its founding, AOCVB has put on 43 clinics in 31 cities and created an online library with more than 3,000 video tutorials.

=== Head coaching record record ===
Year	School	W	L	Pct.	Conference Finish	NCAA Finish	Final Ranking
1985	Pacific	36	3	.923	15–1/1st	1st	2
1986	Pacific	39	3	.929	17–1/1st	1st	2
1987	Pacific	30	4	.882	16–2/2nd	t-5th	1
1988	Pacific	22	13	.629	14–4/2nd	t-5th	10
1989	Pacific	29	5	.853	14–4/2nd	t-9th	3
1990	Pacific	30	7	.811	14–4/3rd	2nd	5
1991	Pacific	24	6	.800	15–3/2nd	t-9th	4
1992	Pacific	27	6	.818	16–2/2nd	t-5th	4
1993	Pacific	21	10	.667	12–6/4th	t-9th	11
1994	Pacific	23	7	.767	14–4/3rd	t-9th	11
1995	Pacific	21	9	.700	14–4/3rd	t-17th	19
1996	Pacific	27	7	.788	14–2/1st	t-9th	12
1997	Pacific	23	9	.719	12–4/3rd	t-17th	16
1998	Pacific	26	6	.813	13–3/3rd	t-9th	10
1999	Pacific	32	3	.914	15–1/1st	t-3rd	3
2000	Pacific	28	4	.875	15–1/1st	t-9th	8
2001	Stanford	33	2	.943	17–1/1st	1st	1
2002	Stanford	32	5	.865	15–3/2nd	2nd	2
2003	Stanford	25	7	.781	14–4/2nd	t-9th	10
2004	Stanford	30	6	.833	15–3/2nd	1st	1
2005	Stanford	26	6	.813	14–4/2nd	t-17th	13
2006	Stanford	30	4	.882	16–2/1st	2nd	2
2007	Stanford	32	3	.914	16–2/1st	2nd	2
2008	Stanford	31	4	.886	17–1/1st	2nd	2
2009	Stanford	23	8	.742	14–4/1st	t-9th	7
2010	Stanford	27	4	.871	15–3/1st	t-5th	5
2011	Stanford	22	8	.733	15-7/4th	t-17th	14
2012	Stanford	30	4	.882	19–1/1st	t-5th	4
2013	Stanford	27	6	.818	17–3/2nd	t-5th	5
2014	Stanford	33	2	.943	19–1/1st	t-3rd	2
2015	Stanford	23	7	.767	16–4/3rd	t-17th	14
2016	Stanford	27	7	.794	15–5/2nd	1st	1
Totals	32 Seasons	888	185	.828	13 Conference Titles	5 NCAA Titles	24 Top-10 Finishes

=== Honors and awards ===
- AVCA National Coach of the Year: 2001, 2016
- AVCA Hall of Fame: 2011 induction
- University of the Pacific Hall of Fame: 2007 induction
- Pac-12 Coach of the Year: 2001, 2007, 2008, 2012
- USA Volleyball All-Time Great Coach Award: 2005
- Big West Coach of the Year: 1986, 1996, 1999, 2000
- Volleyball Monthly National Coach of the Year: 1985
- California Coaches Association Prep Coach of the Year: 1980
- San Jose Sports Hall of Fame: 2019 induction
