= Terry Liskevych =

American volleyball coach

Current position
- Title: Head coach
- Record: 402–294 (college); 337–281 (national team)

Biographical details
- Born: October 14, 1948 (age 78); Munich, Germany

Coaching career (HC unless noted)
- 1972–1973: George Williams (Assistant)
- 1974–1976: Ohio State University
- 1976–1985: University of the Pacific
- 1985–1996: National Team
- 2005–2016: Oregon State University

Accomplishments and honors

Championships
- 1975 Midwestern Intercollegiate Volleyball Association; 1976 Midwestern Intercollegiate Volleyball Association; 1976 Northern California Conference; 1979 Northern California Conference; 1980 Northern California Conference; 1981 Northern California Conference; 1982 Northern Pacific Conference; 1983 Northern Pacific Conference; 1985 Canada Cup; 1995 Canada Cup; 1995 Cocoa Cola Cup; 1995 World Grand Prix

Awards
- 1975 MIVA Coach of the Year; 1976 MIVA Conference Coach of the Year; 1979 NorCal Conference Coach of the Year; 1980 NorCal Conference Coach of the Year; 1981 NorCal Conference Coach of the Year; 1982 NorPac Conference Coach of the Year; 1983 NorPac Conference Coach of the Year; 1983 CVCA National Coach of the Year Award; 1983 NCAA Division 1 Coach of the Year; 1984 NorPac Conference Coach of the Year; 1991 Coach of the World All Star Team; 1991 University of the Pacific Hall of Fame; 1995 International Coach of the Year (FIVB); 2003 AVCA Hall of Fame Inaugural Class; 2003 United States Volleyball All-Era Team; 2014 PAC-12 Coach of the Year; 2014 Regional Coach of the Year (Pacific North Region)

Taras "Terry" Liskevych (Note: Ukrainian: Тарас "Террі" Ліскевич, romanized: Taras "Terri" Liskevych) (/lɪˈskɛvɪtʃ/ liss-KEV-itch; born October 14, 1948) is a Ukrainian-American retired volleyball coach. He served as the United States women's national volleyball team head coach from 1985 to 1996. During his tenure Liskevych posted over 300 international victories.

The highlights of these victories were:

- Bronze medal – World Championship – 1990
- Bronze medal – Olympic Games Barcelona – 1992
- Gold medal – FIVB World Grand Prix – 1995

Leading up to his National Team career, Liskevych coached men's volleyball at Ohio State University (1974–1976), where he twice took the team to the NCAA tournament Final Four in 1975 and 1976 and posted a two-year record of 45–7 (.865 winning percentage). In the fall of 1976 he switched to the women's collegiate game and began his coaching career at the University of the Pacific in Stockton, California. He was there for nine seasons (1976–1985) and accumulated a record of 267–85 (.759) as University of the Pacific finished top five in the nation six of his nine years. While at Pacific (UOP), Liskevych was an assistant professor in the Physical Education and Recreation Department (1976–1981), was an assistant athletic director, supervising the women's programs and overseeing athletic marketing – 1982–1984.

After his National Team career Liskevych worked in the business world as the president of Paragon Marketing (1997–2000), co-founder, vice president and president of ARK Digital Technologies (1998–2003), then as the co-founder and president of Total Sports Inc. (2003–2005). In 2005 he made his return to coaching volleyball as the head women's volleyball coach at Oregon State University in Corvallis, Oregon. He coached for eleven years, retiring in August 2016.

== Early years ==
Liskevych was born in a displaced person's camp in Munich, Germany, to a family of refugees from Ukraine who fled to Germany during the Soviet invasion of Western Ukraine in 1944. In 1951, when Taras was three, the family immigrated to the United States and settled in Chicago, Illinois. Growing up, Liskevych led a life fairly typical of a post-World War II Eastern European immigrant child – attending a local grammar school, St. Nicholas, and going to Ukrainian language school on Saturdays. He was a member of the Ukrainian scouting organization Plast, where he became an eagle scout. His sports activities were centered in the diaspora playing table tennis, tennis, soccer and volleyball. Liskevych attended St. Ignatius High School, where he played on the varsity tennis team and at the same time played soccer for the Chicago Lions. He continued to play soccer at Loyola University (1965–66) and also played in the Chicago Major Division for the Lions Soccer Club.

It was in Plast that Liskevych began to play volleyball at the rather late age of 17. He honed his skills playing and coaching the Chicago Ukrainians Team (1966–1971). His skills developed rapidly, and within a few years he was playing for the Kenneth Allen Club of Chicago, one of the top club teams in the United States, coached by the 1968 Men's Olympic Coach, James E. (Jim) Coleman.

In Chicago, Liskevych pursued his undergraduate degree at Loyola University as a pre-medical student and graduated in 1970 with a Bachelor of Science in Biology. He attended Loyola Stritch School of Medicine in Maywood, Illinois for one year (1970–71) and dropped out in the summer of 1971 to pursue a career in volleyball. In 1972, he completed a Master's of Science degree in Physical Education at George Williams College. In 1976, Liskevych completed his Ph.D. at Ohio State University in Physical Education – with emphases in international sport and sports psychology.

== College coaching career ==
George Williams College (1972–1973)

While at George Williams College, Liskevych began his college coaching career as an assistant men's volleyball coach under 1968 Olympic coach and U.S. Volleyball Hall of Fame member Jim Coleman. At the same time, he coached the Chicago Volleyball Club, a top women's club team in the United States Volleyball Association. This team produced several USA National Team Players in the early and mid-1970s.

The Ohio State University (1974–1976)

In 1974, he was hired as the head men's volleyball coach at Ohio State University. He guided the Buckeyes to the co-championships of the Midwestern Intercollegiate Volleyball Association (MIVA), and to a third-place finish in both the 1975 and 1976 NCAA National Championships. In both 1975 and 1976, Liskevych was selected as the MIVA Coach of the Year.

Accomplishments at Ohio State:

- Two NCAA Final Four appearances – the first ever in OSU history
- Two MIVA Conference Championships
- Two Conference Coach-of-the-Year Awards
- Three of the OSU players (Aldis Berzins, Marc Waldie, Rich Duwelius) later played on the USA Men's Gold Medal Team in the 1984 Los Angeles Olympic Games

University of the Pacific (1976–1984)

In the summer of 1976, Liskevych left Ohio State for Stockton, California, where he made the switch to women's collegiate volleyball, becoming the head coach at the University of the Pacific in Stockton, California. At the time of Liskevych's arrival, UOP's volleyball program was a Division III one-year-old program that was at an intramural level competitively and had a combined scholarship/operating budget of less than $3,500. In his nine seasons at UOP, Liskevych coached the team to six conference titles, and finished in the top five in the country in Division I (AIAW – 1979–1980 and NCAA – 1981–1984). Liskevych was recognized as the conference coach of the year on five occasions. Off the court during that time Liskevych started the first national Top Ten and Top Twenty Poll, created and developed the premier women's collegiate four team volleyball tournament the Wendy's Classic (1979–1984) and co-founded the Collegiate Volleyball Coaches Association (CVCA) in 1981, which is now the American Volleyball Coaches Association (AVCA) and, as of 2009, had over 5,000 members. [8]

Accomplishments at University of the Pacific:

- 267–85 overall record (.759 winning percentage)
- Six conference championships (never finishing lower than 3rd)
- Five Final Four appearances
- Six NCAA Playoff appearances (Never finishing lower than 5th)
- Seven different UOP players were selected First Team All-Americans
- Three of his UOP players played on the USA National Team – Jayne Gibson-McHugh, Eileen Dempster and Terri McGrath.
- Five times Conference Coach-of-the-Year and one time National Coach-of-the- Year

== International coaching career – USA Volleyball Team (1984–1996) ==
Taras Liskevych began his international career in 1975 as the USA Women's assistant coach under Arie Selinger. He was also the assistant at the 1975 Pan American Games in Mexico City. It was not until ten years later that he was appointed the head coach of the U.S. Women's Volleyball Team in 1985.

In the summer of 1984, Liskevych worked as a volunteer at the Los Angeles Olympic Games. He was an information coordinator of the volleyball venue at Long Beach Arena. It was at this time where he witnessed the USA Men win the gold medal and the USA Women win the silver that he decided to pursue the USA Women's Volleyball head coaching position for the National and Olympic teams.

After the 1984 Olympics, at which the U.S. team won the silver medal, the coaching staff and all the players left, leaving Liskevych with nothing: no video tapes, no scouting reports, and no national junior team from which players could be drawn.

In 1985, despite the difficult starting point, Liskevych put together a winning first season with a 25–20 record. A year later the team started making steps toward becoming a world contender by winning the Canada Cup and placing third at the Goodwill Games. Then in 1987 the team won the bronze medal at the Pan American Games and placed second at the NORCECA Zone Championships, which qualified the long-shot U.S. team for the 1988 Seoul Olympic Games. At the Olympics, the U.S. placed seventh, barely losing to Peru in the last match of pool play (Peru went on to win the silver medal). By 1990, Liskevych had established the American team as a dominant force in international women's volleyball with a third-place finish at the World Championship. In 1991 the U.S. qualified for the Barcelona Summer Olympics by placing fourth at the World Cup in Japan. Liskevych gained personal recognition that year when he was asked to coach the World All-Stars in a two-match series against the defending World Champion USSR at the World Gala. Liskevych's squad won both matches in Rome and Barcelona.

At the 1992 Barcelona Olympics, Liskevych guided the USA Team to a bronze medal. After losing a hard-fought match to Cuba (2–3), the women played magnificently the next day in defeating Brazil 3–0 for the bronze medal. This finish motivated Liskevych along with the rest of his team to give it one more run for Olympic gold in a home Olympics – the 1996 Centennial Olympic Games in Atlanta. In the 1995 season, the USA Women were well on their way to achieve this goal. They won 78 percent of their matches, capturing the Canada Cup and the Coca-Cola Cup, and won the $2 million World Grand Prix (a grueling six-week event in Asia) where they defeated Cuba, China and Brazil in the finals in Shanghai. However, the team finished a disappointing 7th at the Summer Olympic Games in Atlanta, losing in the quarterfinals to the eventual gold medalist Cuba (0–3). Liskevych left the USA program in December 1996. He served on several Federation of International Volleyball (FIVB) committees – 1998–2001 – and spent time as a consultant for the Australian national teams from 1995 to 2004.

== Oregon State University ==
After coaching the USA National Team for 12 years, Liskevych decided to enter the business world – 1997–2004. Before the 2005 season he returned to coaching and accepted the head coach position for women's volleyball at Oregon State University in Corvallis, Oregon. Liskevych became the 10th volleyball coach in school history April 4, 2005, replacing Nancy Somera, who left OSU after leading the Beavers for the previous six seasons. He took over a team that finished the 2004 season tied for seventh in the Pac–10 Conference with a conference record of 5–13 (12–16 overall).

In 2005, Liskevych's squad showed dramatic improvement, if not with its win–loss record, then certainly with its hustle and determination on the court. In his first season at the helm, Liskevych began the season with a group that included two starters and several role players that were required to step up their games. Through the ups and downs of learning the ins and outs of a new team, a new coaching staff and a new university, the Beavers came together to show improvement in all aspects of the game, allowing Liskevych to evaluate the entire program, to determine his needs for the future, both on the court and off.

The 2006 season did not meet expectations in the win column, but, with his first recruiting class arriving on campus, Liskevych did dramatically improve the athleticism and size in the program. Two rookies received Pac-10 All-Freshman Team honors.

The team took strides in 2007, upsetting a pair of highly ranked teams, including sweeping No. 10 Hawai'i on the road, which had never been done by an unranked team, and defeating No. 4 UCLA in Pauley Pavilion. A pair of players earned All-Pac-10 honors and Liskevych returned the majority of the team, looking for even more improvement in 2008 with his youthful squad.

Liskevych coached Oregon State's first ever All-American in Rachel Rourke in 2008, with Rourke adding AVCA All-America Second Team accolades in 2009. And the upsets continued over the next two seasons, boosting the team to its first top-25 ranking since 1996 in 2008, climbing to 24th. In 2009, the Beavers swept No. 6 Michigan in Ann Arbor, snapping a 52-match non-conference winning streak for the Wolverines.

Liskevych and the Oregon State program had a remarkable turnaround in 2014. The Beavers ended the 2014 season with 21 wins, the third most wins at Oregon State in the NCAA era. The Beavers also earned their first two NCAA Tournament wins in school history, eventually losing to Stanford in the Sweet 16. Freshman Mary-Kate Marshall became OSU's second All-American, and Liskevych was named 2014 PAC-12 Coach of the Year and 2014 Regional Coach of the Year (Pacific North Region). Since his arrival he has posted an overall record of 96–143.

Liskevych retired from coaching in 2016.

== Honors and awards ==
- 1975 – 1976 – Midwestern Intercollegiate Volleyball Association Coach of the Year
- 1979 – 1984 – Five time Conference Coach of the Year– NorPac, NorCal & PCAA
- 1981 – Co-founded Collegiate Volleyball Coaches Association
- 1983 – CVCA National Coach of the Year Award (NCAA – Division I)
- 1983 – NCAA Division I Coach of the Year
- 1991 – Coach of the World All Star Team – Barcelona and Rome
- 1991 – Selected to the University of the Pacific Hall of Fame – 1991/1992 class
- 1995 – International Coach of the Year – Federation of International Volleyball (FIVB)
- 2003 – American Volleyball Coaches Association (AVCA) Hall of Fame Inaugural Class
- 2003 – United States Volleyball All-Era Team – 1978–2003 – USA Women's Head Coach
- 2014 – PAC-12 Coach of the Year
- 2014 – Regional Coach of the Year (Pacific North Region)

== Liskevych non-coaching volleyball innovations ==
- 1978 – Originator of the first Top Twenty Collegiate Volleyball Polls – now a widely used measure of the country's top volleyball teams and a strong publicity tool for the sport. The Associated Press first carried the poll.
- 1979 – Co-founded the Collegiate Volleyball Coaches Association (CVCA) – this organization grew rapidly and evolved into the American Volleyball Coaches Association (AVCA) the largest organization of volleyball coaches.
- 1976–1987 – Volleyball Clinics. Liskevych was one of the first to actively promote and produce volleyball clinics nationwide – The American Volleyball Coaches Clinics, Inc. and the Volleyball International/Sports Associates, Inc. Clinics were the first professionally run national volleyball clinics in the US.
- 1979 – Established the Wendy's Classic – the premier women's college volleyball tournament in the US. This four-team weekend event was televised (starting in 1980) and played to capacity crowds of 6,000+ per night – two nights every November 1980 – 1984. The event brought in annual revenues of $100,000 +.
- 1988 – Created, developed and produced (with Ken Grosse) the Women's Collegiate Volleyball All-Star Classic – sponsored by Yugo America, Reebok, Sports Imports, JogBra and Wilson Sporting Goods. The event was televised on ESPN and was played in Stockton, California at the University of the Pacific.
- 1989 – Facility Design and National Center. Liskevych spearhead an effort to build a National Volleyball Training Center. He created and developed the concept and negotiated with the city of Carlsbad, California for a 17.5-acre state-of- the art training center and events center.
- 1992 – Developed a "white paper" – The Professional Volleyball League – A Preliminary Prospectus. This was an innovative study on the formation of volleyball professional leagues in the USA.
- 2011 - Co-founded the Art of Coaching volleyball clinic series and website, theartofcoachingvolleyball.com.

== Head coaching record ==
National Team record

Team	Year	Record	Pct.	Top finishes
USA (W)	1996	23–20	.535	7th Olympics/5th Grand Prix
USA (W)	1995	57–16	.781	1st Grand Prix/7th World Cup
USA (W)	1994	25–20	.556	6th World Championship
USA (W)	1993	15–27	.357	2nd NORCECA (zone)
USA (W)	1992	15–22	.405	3rd Olympics/3rd Super Four
USA (W)	1991	38–22	.633	2nd NORCECA/4th World Cup
USA (W)	1990	41–32	.562	3rd World Championship
USA (W)	1989	16–20	.444	3rd NORCECA
USA (W)	1988	32–15	.681	7th Olympics
USA (W)	1987	26–34	.433	2nd NORCECA/3rd Pan Am
USA (W)	1986	24–33	.421	10th World Championship
USA (W)	1985	25–20	.556	2nd NORCECA

International coaching record totals

Years	Wins	Losses	Winning %
12	337	281	.545

College record

Team	Year	Record	Pct.	Conference	National standings
Oregon State (W)	2015	6-24	.200	Tied for 10th (Pac-12)	148th (RPI)
Oregon State (W)	2014	21-13	.618	Tied for 7th (Pac-12)	23rd (RPI)
Oregon State (W)	2013	9–22	.290	12th (Pac-12)	138th (RPI)
Oregon State (W)	2012	14–18	.437	Tied for 10th (Pac-12)	63rd (RPI)
Oregon State (W)	2011	16–16	.500	8th (Pac-12)	103rd (RPI)
Oregon State (W)	2010	9–23	.281	9th (Pac-10)	130th (RPI)
Oregon State (W)	2009	12–18	.400	Tied for 9th (Pac-10)	75th (RPI)
Oregon State (W)	2008	14–17	.450	9th (Pac-10)	82nd (RPI)
Oregon State (W)	2007	10–20	.333	9th (Pac-10)	74th (RPI)
Oregon State (W)	2006	3–24	.111	10th (Pac-10)	146th (RPI)
Oregon State (W)	2005	11–13	.458	7th (Pac-10)	------
Pacific (W)	1984	31–8	.795	2nd (PCAA)	3rd (NCAA)
Pacific (W)	1983	37–4	.903	1st (NorPac)	4th (NCAA)
Pacific (W)	1982	32–8	.800	1st (NorPac)	5th (NCAA)
Pacific (W)	1981	27–13	.675	1st (NorCal)	4th (NCAA)
Pacific (W)	1980	48–8	.857	1st (NorCal)	2nd (AIAW)
Pacific (W)	1979	40–11	.784	1st (NorCal)	4th
Pacific (W)	1978	23–15	.605	3rd (NorCal)	-----
Pacific (W)	1977	12–10	.535	3rd (NorCal)	-----
Pacific (W)	1976	17–8	.680	1st (NorCal)	-----
Ohio State (M)	1976	24–4	.857	1st (MIVA)	3rd (NCAA)
Ohio State (M)	1975	21–3	.875	1st (MIVA)	3rd (NCAA)

College record totals

Years	Wins	Losses	Winning %
22	437	358	.550

== Athletic participation ==
- Columbus Caps Volleyball Club, 1974–1976 (USVBAA-AAU)
- Chicago Volleyball Club, 1973–1974 (USVBA-AAU)
- Kenneth Allen Volleyball Club, Chicago, 1971–1973 (USVBA-AAU)
- Chicago Ukrainians Volleyball Club, 1967–1971, Captain, 1969–1971 (USVBA-AAU)
- Loyola University Varsity Soccer Team, 1967–1970, Captain, 1969
- Major Division Soccer – Chicago Lions, 1968–1969
- Varsity Tennis – St. Ignatius, 1962–1965
- Soccer – Chicago Lions Juvenile and Junior Competition, 1957–1964
- Table Tennis – Chicago Lions – 1962–64

== Publications ==
- Managing Your Health Care (with Martin Gipson and Edwin Swillinger) Pathfinder Publishing, Ventura, CA 1996
- Championship Skills: Youth Volleyball (with Don Patterson) Master Press, Indianapolis, IN 1995
- Volleyball Is A Hit Master Press, Grand Rapids, MI, 1986 – 1st Edition, 2nd edition 1993, 3rd edition 2005
- A Pictorial Analysis of Power Volleyball (with Jim Coleman) Creative Sports, Hollywood, CA 1972
