= Bobbi Petersen =

American volleyball coach

Bobbi Petersen (Becker)
Current position
- Title: Head coach
- Team: Northern Iowa
- Conference: Missouri Valley Conference
- Record: 635–223 (.740)

Biographical details
- Born: August 10; Dike, Iowa, U.S.
- Education: Northern Iowa

Coaching career (HC unless noted)
- 1994–1996: Northern Iowa (asst.)
- 1997: Northern Iowa (interim HC)
- 1998–2000: Northern Iowa (asst.)
- 2001–present: Northern Iowa

Head coaching record
- Overall: 635–223 (.740)

Accomplishments and honors

Championships
- 13x MVC regular season 13x MVC Tournament

Awards
- 2002 National Coach of the Year; AVCA All-Region Coach of the Year (2001, 2002, 2018, 2019); 10x MVC Coach of the Year (2006, 2009, 2010, 2011, 2013, 2019, 2022, 2023, 2024, 2025)

Bobbi Petersen (née Becker) is an American volleyball coach who is the head coach of the Northern Iowa women's college volleyball team.

== Early life ==
Becker grew up in Dike, Iowa and played volleyball at the University of Northern Iowa. She was inducted in the UNI athletic hall of fame in 2003.

== Coaching career ==
=== Northern Iowa ===
Petersen has led the Panthers for 25 seasons. In 2021 she became the winningest coach in Missouri Valley Conference history with 511 wins.

== Head coaching record ==
Petersen is listed as one of the best college coaches of the 21st century with over 600 wins and including 13 MVC regular season titles and 12 MVC tournament titles.

Record table
Season	Team	Overall	Conference	Standing	Postseason
UNI (Missouri Valley Conference) (1997–1997)
1997	UNI	18–9	13–5	3rd	
UNI (Missouri Valley Conference) (2001–Present)
2001	UNI	31–2	17–1	1st	NCAA Sweet Sixteen
2002	UNI	34–3	17–1	1st	NCAA Sweet Sixteen
2003	UNI	28–6	16–2	2nd	NCAA Second round
2004	UNI	22–10	13–5	T–2nd	
2005	UNI	20–12	12–6	4th	
2006	UNI	28–8	16–2	1st	NCAA Second round
2007	UNI	22–11	14–4	T-2nd	NCAA First round
2008	UNI	25–9	13–5	3rd	NCAA First round
2009	UNI	31–3	18–0	1st	NCAA Second round
2010	UNI	30–3	18–0	1st	NCAA First round
2011	UNI	33–2	18–0	1st	NCAA Second round
2012	UNI	25–10	15–3	2nd	NCAA Second round
2013	UNI	23–8	15–3	T–1st	
2014	UNI	21–11	14–4	2nd	
2015	UNI	19–15	12–6	T-4th	NCAA First Round
2016	UNI	24–10	14–4	3rd	NCAA First Round
2017	UNI	27–9	14–3	2nd	NCAA Second Round
2018	UNI	24–10	16–2	T-1st	NCAA First Round
2019	UNI	24–11	17–1	1st	NCAA First Round
2020	UNI	9–13	8–8	8th	
2021	UNI	12–19	7–11	T-6th	
2022	UNI	27–8	17–1	T-6th	NCAA Second Round
2023	UNI	26–7	18–0	1st	NCAA First Round
2024	UNI	26–8	18–0	1st	NCAA Second Round
2025	UNI	26–6	16–0	1st	NCAA Second Round
UNI:		635–223 (.740)	391–77 (.835)		
Total:		635–223 (.740)			
National champion Postseason invitational champion Conference regular season champion Conference regular season and conference tournament champion Division regular season champion Division regular season and conference tournament champion Conference tournament champion
