= Cary Wendell =

American volleyball player (born 1974)

Personal information
- Full name: Cary Wendell Wallin
- Born: April 4, 1974 (age 52)
- Hometown: Arroyo Grande, California, U.S.
- Height: 5 ft 11 in (180 cm)
- Education: Stanford University

Volleyball information
- Position: Setter / Outside hitter (Stanford)
- Number: 3 (Stanford)

National team
1994	United States
Medal record
Women's volleyball
Representing the United States
Goodwill Games
Silver medal – second place	1994 Saint Petersburg	Team

Cary Wendell (born April 4, 1974) is an American former volleyball player. She played for the United States women's national volleyball team, and helped the United States win the silver medal at the 1994 Goodwill Games in Saint Petersburg.

== College ==
Wendell was the NCAA Player of the Year in 1995 at Stanford. She was selected as an AVCA All-American in 1993, 1994, and 1995. She was a setter and outside hitter at Stanford.

In 2006, Wendell was inducted into the Stanford Athletics Hall of Fame.

== Awards ==
- Stanford Athletics Hall of Fame
