= 1985 NCAA Division I women's volleyball tournament =

Volleyball competition

1985 NCAA women's Division I volleyball tournament
- Champions: Pacific (1st title)
- Runner-up: Stanford (2nd title match)
- Semifinalists: Southern California (3rd Final Four); UCLA (4th Final Four)
- Winning coach: John Dunning (1st title)
- Final Four All-Tournament Team: Teri McGrath (Pacific); Elaina Oden (Pacific); Kim Oden (Stanford); Wendi Rush (Stanford); Kim Ruddins (Southern California); Liz Masakayan (UCLA)

The 1985 NCAA Division I women's volleyball tournament began with 28 teams and ended on December 22, 1985, when Pacific defeated Stanford 3 games to 1 in the NCAA championship match.

Pacific, making their 4th NCAA final four in five years (in addition to their 1980 AIAW title match loss), claimed the school's first NCAA title for women's volleyball. Stanford finished as NCAA runners-up for the second year in a row. After losing a thrilling game 1 by two points, Pacific rallied to win the next three to take the title with the scores of 15-7, 15-12, 15-13.

Future Olympian sisters Elaina Oden and Kim Oden played against each other in the final. Elaina Oden, a freshman hitter for the Pacific Tigers, had 24 kills against Stanford.

In the consolation match, Southern California defeated UCLA in five games to claim third place.

== Brackets ==
=== West regional ===
First Round
Colorado State	3
Rhode Island	0
Arizona State	2
Arizona	3
BYU	3
Providence	0

Regional semifinal
Stanford	3
Colorado State	0
Arizona	2
BYU	3

Regional final
Stanford	3
BYU	1

=== Mideast regional ===
First Round
Illinois	3
Western Michigan	1
Purdue	3
Illinois State	0
Nebraska	3
Penn State	0

Regional semifinal
Southern California	3
Illinois	1
Purdue	1
Nebraska	3

Regional final
Southern California	3
Nebraska	1

=== South regional ===
First Round
Georgia	3
Florida State	0
Texas A&M	3
UT Arlington	2
Texas	3
Duke	0

Regional semifinal
UCLA	3
Georgia	0
Texas A&M	0
Texas	3

Regional final
UCLA	3
Texas	0

=== Northwest regional ===
First Round
Hawaiʻi	3
San Diego State	1
Cal Poly	3
UCSB	2
San Jose State	3
Long Beach State	0

Regional semifinal
Pacific	3
Hawaiʻi	0
Cal Poly	3
San Jose State	0

Regional final
Pacific	3
Cal Poly	0

== Final Four - Read Fieldhouse, Kalamazoo, Michigan ==
Semifinals
Stanford	3
Southern California	1
UCLA	1
Pacific	3

Finals
Stanford	1
Pacific	3
Third place
Southern California	3
UCLA	2

== See also ==
- 1985 NCAA men's volleyball tournament
- 1985 NCAA Division II women's volleyball tournament
- 1985 NCAA Division III women's volleyball tournament
- 1985 NAIA women's volleyball tournament
