= 2000 NCAA Division I women's volleyball tournament =

Volleyball competition

2000 NCAA women's Division I volleyball tournament
- 2000 NCAA Final Four logo
- Champions: Nebraska (2nd title)
- Runner-up: Wisconsin (1st title match)
- Semifinalists: Hawaiʻi (6th Final Four); Southern California (4th Final Four)
- Winning coach: John Cook (1st title)
- Most outstanding player: Greichaly Cepero (Nebraska)
- Final Four All-Tournament Team: Amber Holmquist (Nebraska); Laura Pilakowski (Nebraska); Lizzy Fitzgerald (Wisconsin); Sherisa Livingston (Wisconsin); Lily Kahumoku (Hawaiʻi)

The 2000 NCAA Division I women's volleyball tournament began on November 30, 2000 with 64 teams and ended December 16 when Nebraska defeated Wisconsin 3 games to 2 in Richmond, Virginia for the program's second NCAA title.

Nebraska became the second team in NCAA history to finish the season undefeated, as they joined Long Beach State from 1998 to pull off the feat. The win gave John Cook his first national title in just his first year as Nebraska's head coach. Wisconsin, for whom Cook was the previous head coach, made the program's first Final Four appearance.

This was the last season that the NCAA used side out scoring, switching to rally scoring in 2001.

== Records ==
For the third straight year, the tournament field remained fixed at 64 teams. The Big Ten, Big 12, and Pac-10 tied for the most bids in the 2000 NCAA Tournament with six bids each. The top six seeds each came from different conferences, the only such instance of this in the 64-team era. Nebraska went undefeated en route to a national championship, joining 1998 Long Beach State and later teams 2003 USC and 2008-09 Penn State as undefeated national champions.

Central Regional
Seed	School	Conference	Berth Type	Record
	Alabama A&M	SWAC	Automatic	31-2
8	Arizona	Pac-10	Auto (shared)	25-4
	Ball State	MAC	At-large	25-6
9	BYU	Mountain West	Automatic	24-6
	Cincinnati	Conference USA	At-large	24-9
	George Washington	Atlantic 10	Automatic	25-5
	Hofstra	America East	Automatic	23-10
	Louisville	Conference USA	Automatic	26-7
	Michigan	Big Ten	At-large	18-13
	Missouri	Big 12	At-large	24-6
1	Nebraska	Big 12	Automatic	28-0
	Notre Dame	Big East	Automatic	25-6
16	Ohio State	Big Ten	At-large	21-9
	Princeton	Ivy League	Automatic	20-8
	South Carolina	SEC	At-large	21-6
	Utah State	Big West	At-large	21-9

Pacific Regional
Seed	School	Conference	Berth Type	Record
	Ark.-Little Rock	Sun Belt	Automatic	23-6
	Cal Poly	Big West	At-large	16-11
	Colorado	Big 12	At-large	16-11
6	Colorado State	Mountain West	At-large	30-4
14	Florida	SEC	Automatic	27-4
	Georgia State	Trans America	Automatic	28-9
	Georgia Tech	ACC	At-large	25-7
	James Madison	CAA	Automatic	21-9
	North Carolina	ACC	Automatic	26-7
11	Penn State	Big Ten	At-large	27-5
	Radford	Big South	Automatic	28-6
	South Florida	Conference USA	At-large	28-5
	Southeast Missouri State	Ohio Valley	Automatic	22-8
	Tennessee	SEC	At-large	23-9
3	USC	Pac-10	Auto (shared)	25-2
	Washington State	Pac-10	At-large	18-9

West Regional
Seed	School	Conference	Berth Type	Record
	Arizona State	Pac-10	At-large	17-11
	Cal State Sacramento	Big Sky	Automatic	21-11
	Davidson	Southern	Automatic	24-11
	Duke	ACC	At-large	21-12
5	Hawaii	WAC	Automatic	27-1
	Long Beach State	Big West	At-large	22-7
	Loyola Marymount	West Coast	At-large	20-8
4	Minnesota	Big Ten	At-large	28-3
	Robert Morris	Northeast	Automatic	21-15
	San Jose State	WAC	At-large	22-9
12	Santa Clara	West Coast	Automatic	26-4
	Stanford	Pac-10	At-large	18-11
	Texas Tech	Big 12	At-large	24-8
13	UC Santa Barbara	Big West	At-large	23-7
	Utah	Mountain West	At-large	22-7
	UTSA	Southland	Automatic	24-8

Mideast Regional
Seed	School	Conference	Berth Type	Record
	Bucknell	Patriot	Automatic	17-14
	Fairfield	MAAC	Automatic	26-6
	Houston	Conference USA	At-large	21-10
	Kansas State	Big 12	At-large	20-8
	Loyola (IL)	Midwestern Collegiate	Automatic	22-8
	Michigan State	Big Ten	At-large	17-12
	Milwaukee	Midwestern Collegiate	At-large	23-4
	Morgan State	MEAC	Automatic	25-15
	Northern Iowa	Missouri Valley	Automatic	28-4
	Oral Roberts	Mid-Continent	Automatic	21-11
2	Pacific	Big West	Automatic	26-3
10	Pepperdine	West Coast	At-large	23-6
	Texas A&M	Big 12	At-large	19-8
15	UCLA	Pac-10	At-large	22-7
	Western Michigan	MAC	Automatic	25-5
7	Wisconsin	Big Ten	Automatic	28-3

== Central Regional (Lincoln) ==
First round November 30-December 1
1	Nebraska	3
Princeton	0
Lincoln, NE
South Carolina	3
George Washington	0
Notre Dame	3
Cincinnati	0
Columbus, OH
Ball State	1
16	Ohio State	3
9	BYU	3
Hofstra	0
Orem, UT
Utah State	3
Missouri	2
Michigan	3
Louisville	1
Tucson, AZ
Alabama A&M	0
8	Arizona	3

Second round December 2–3
1	Nebraska	3
South Carolina	2
Notre Dame	2
16	Ohio State	3
9	BYU	3
Utah State	2
Michigan	0
8	Arizona	3

Regional semifinals December 7–8
1	Nebraska	3
16	Ohio State	0
9	Brigham Young	0
8	Arizona	3

Regional finals December 9–10
1	Nebraska	3
8	Arizona	0

== West Regional (Honolulu) ==
First round November 30-December 1
5	Hawaiʻi	3
Davidson	0
Honolulu, HI
Texas Tech	2
Utah	3
Long Beach State	3
San Jose State	1
Santa Clara, CA
Cal St. Sacramento	0
12	Santa Clara	3
13	UCSB	3
Texas San Antonio	0
Santa Barbara, CA
Loyola Marymount	0
Stanford	3
Arizona State	3
Duke	1
Minneapolis, MN
Robert Morris	0
4	Minnesota	3

Second round December 2–3
5	Hawaiʻi	3
Utah	0
Long Beach State	3
12	Santa Clara	2
13	UCSB	3
Stanford	2
Arizona State	0
4	Minnesota	3

Regional semifinals December 7–8
5	Hawaiʻi	3
Long Beach State	2
13	UCSB	3
4	Minnesota	1

Regional finals December 9–10
5	Hawaiʻi	3
13	UCSB	1

== Pacific Regional (Los Angeles) ==
First round November 30-December 1
3	Southern California	3
Georgia State University	0
Los Angeles, CA
Cal Poly	3
South Florida	1
North Carolina	2
SE Missouri State	3
Gainesville, FL
Arkansas-Little Rock	0
14	Florida	3
11	Penn State	3
James Madison	0
University Park, PA
Tennessee	0
Washington State	3
Georgia Tech	1
Colorado	3
Fort Collins, CO
Radford	0
6	Colorado State	3

Second round December 2–3
3	Southern California	3
Cal Poly	0
SE Missouri State	0
14	Florida	3
11	Penn State	3
Washington State	1
Colorado	2
6	Colorado State	3

Regional semifinals December 7–8
3	Southern California	3
14	Florida	0
11	Penn State	3
6	Colorado State	1

Regional finals December 9–10
3	Southern California	3
11	Penn State	0

== Mideast Regional (Madison) ==
First round November 30-December 1
7	Wisconsin	3
Bucknell	0
Madison, WI
Western Michigan	1
Northern Iowa	3
Kansas State	3
Loyola (Ill.)	1
Malibu, CA
Fairfield	1
10	Pepperdine	3
15	UCLA	3
Morgan State	0
Los Angeles, CA
UW–Milwaukee	1
Michigan State	3
Texas A&M	3
Houston	0
Stockton, CA
Oral Roberts	0
2	Pacific	3

Second round December 2–3
7	Wisconsin	3
Northern Iowa	1
Kansas State	3
10	Pepperdine	1
15	UCLA	3
Michigan State	2
Texas A&M	0
2	Pacific	3

Regional semifinals December 7–8
7	Wisconsin	3
Kansas State	1
15	UCLA	3
2	Pacific	1

Regional finals December 9–10
7	Wisconsin	3
15	UCLA	2

== Final Four – Richmond Coliseum, Richmond, VA ==
National Semifinals; December 14
1	Nebraska	3
5	Hawaiʻi	1
3	Southern California	0
7	Wisconsin	3

National Championship; December 16
1	Nebraska	3
7	Wisconsin	2

== National Semifinals ==
Teams	Game 1	Game 2	Game 3	Game 4
NEB	15	15	9	15
HAW	3	12	15	10

=== Nebraska vs. Hawaiʻi ===
Aided by 23 team blocks, top seeded Nebraska cruised past Hawaiʻi in four sets. Nebraska junior Jenny Kropp had 16 kills to lead the way for the Huskers. Sophomore outside hitter Lily Kahumoku led Hawaiʻi with 18 kills, while freshman Kim Willoughby had 15.

Teams	Game 1	Game 2	Game 3
WISC	15	15	15
USC	10	9	9

=== Wisconsin vs. Southern California ===
Appearing in the program's first ever Final Four, Wisconsin swept USC to earn a spot in the title match against Nebraska.

== National Championship: Nebraska vs. Wisconsin ==
Teams	Game 1	Game 2	Game 3	Game 4	Game 5
NEB	15	9	7	15	15
WISC	9	15	15	2	9

Nebraska jumped on top to start out the match, with a block giving NU the first game, 15-9. In the second game, Wisconsin raced out to the 13-4 lead before winning, 15-9, to tie the match at one game a piece.

Leading 5-4 in the third game, Wisconsin pulled away by winning eight straight points to go up 13-4. Nebraska responded with three straight points of their own to cut the lead to 13-7, before two Badger kills ended the game, 15-7, to put the Badgers up 2-1 on the undefeated Huskers.

Nebraska responded strongly in set 4, crushing the Badgers, 15-2, to force a fifth game. In the decisive fifth game, Nebraska raced out to the 4-0 lead. Nebraska continued to roll, going up 11-5. Nebraska earned championship point on a kill, before Laura Pilakowski crushed her 23rd kill of the match to seal the victory.

The national title capped a season in which the Huskers achieved much success. The Huskers became just the second team in NCAA history to finish the season undefeated with a national title, joining the 1998 Long Beach State squad. Nebraska, ranked No. 1 in the AVCA/USA Today Coaches poll for 14 straight weeks, swept 26 of its 33 opponents in 2000. It was Nebraska head coach John Cook's first season with the program. Cook was previously the head coach at Wisconsin.

== NCAA Tournament records ==
There are three NCAA tournament record that were set in the 2000 tournament that still stands.

- Total attacks in NCAA tournament (team record) - Wisconsin, 1019 (56 vs. Bucknell, 178 vs. UNI, 182 vs. Kansas State, 260 vs. UCLA, 152 vs. Southern California, 191 vs. Nebraska).
- Total digs, tournament (team record) - Wisconsin, 200 (26 vs. Bucknell, 72 vs. UNI, 71 vs. Kansas State, 99 vs. UCLA, 67 vs. Southern California, 75 vs. Nebraska).
- Hitting percentage, tournament (individual record - min. 75 attempts) - .564%, Marissa Dalee, University of Arizona (.588 vs. Alabama A&M, .667 vs. Michigan, .294 vs. BYU, .654 vs. Nebraska).
