= 1992 NCAA Division I women's volleyball tournament =

Volleyball competition

1992 NCAA women's Division I volleyball tournament
- 1992 NCAA Final Four logo
- Champions: Stanford (1st title)
- Runner-up: UCLA (6th NCAA (12th national) title match)
- Semifinalists: Florida (1st Final Four); Long Beach State (3rd Final Four)
- Winning coach: Don Shaw (1st title)
- Final Four All-Tournament Team: Carrie Feldman (Stanford); Bev Oden (Stanford); Cary Wendell (Stanford); Natalie Williams (UCLA); Elaine Youngs (UCLA); Aycan Gokberk (Florida)

The 1992 NCAA Division I women's volleyball tournament began with 32 teams and ended on December 19, 1992, when Stanford defeated UCLA 3-1 in the NCAA championship match.

Stanford won the program's first NCAA title after three previous runner-up finishes. UCLA was the top ranked team in the country and was undefeated coming into the match. The Bruins were the two time defending national champions, and became the first university to appear in three straight NCAA title matches, equaling its previous AIAW national title match streak from 1974 through 1976. UCLA's 43 match win streak was snapped with the loss.

The 1992 Final Four was held at The Pit in Albuquerque, New Mexico.

== Records ==
Seed	School	Conference	Berth Type	Record
	Arkansas State	Sun Belt	Automatic	41-5
	Arizona State	Pac-10	At-large	22-7
	Ball State	Mid-American	Automatic	22-9
	BYU	WAC	Automatic	27-3
	Cal State Northridge	Big Sky	At-large	27-7
	Colorado	Big Eight	Automatic	22-8
	Duke	ACC	Automatic	26-4
	Florida	SEC	Automatic	31-1
	Florida State	ACC	At-large	26-7
	Georgia	SEC	At-large	24-8
	Houston	Southwest	At-large	19-13
	Idaho	Big Sky	Automatic	24-6
	Illinois	Big Ten	Auto (shared)	30-3
	Illinois State	Missouri Valley	Automatic	29-3
	Kentucky	SEC	At-large	24-8
	Long Beach State	Big West	Automatic	27-2
	Louisville	Metro	Automatic	24-8
	LSU	SEC	At-large	25-8
	Nebraska	Big Eight	At-large	21-5
	New Mexico	WAC	At-large	18-11
	Notre Dame	Midwestern Collegiate	Automatic	30-7
	Ohio State	Big Ten	At-large	21-8
	Pacific	Big West	At-large	25-5
	Penn State	Big Ten	Auto (shared)	27-3
	Pittsburgh	Big East	Automatic	18-13
	Santa Clara	West Coast	Automatic	21-10
	Stanford	Pac-10	At-large	26-2
	Texas	Southwest	Automatic	27-5
	Texas Tech	Southwest	At-large	23-9
	UC Santa Barbara	Big West	At-large	22-7
	UCLA	Pac-12	Automatic	29-0
	USC	Pac-10	At-large	20-8

== Brackets ==
=== West regional ===
First round
UCLA	3
Ball State	0
Arizona State	3
New Mexico	2
Cal St. Northridge	0
Southern California	3
Santa Clara	0
BYU	3

Regional semifinal
UCLA	3
Arizona State	0
Southern California	1
BYU	3

Regional Final
UCLA	3
BYU	0

=== South regional ===
First round
Florida	3
Florida State	0
Kentucky	3
Duke	1
Texas Tech	0
LSU	3
Georgia	1
Texas	3

Regional semifinal
Florida	3
Kentucky	0
LSU	1
Texas	3

Regional Final
Florida	3
Texas	2

=== Northwest regional ===
First round
Long Beach State	3
Arkansas State	0
Illinois State	3
Houston	0
Idaho	0
UCSB	3
Louisville	0
Pacific	3

Regional semifinal
Long Beach State	3
Illinois State	0
UCSB	1
Pacific	3

Regional Final
Long Beach State	3
Pacific	1

=== Mideast regional ===
First round
Stanford	3
Pittsburgh	0
Penn State	3
Notre Dame	0
Colorado	1
Nebraska	3
Ohio State	0
Illinois	3

Regional semifinal
Stanford	3
Penn State	0
Nebraska	1
Illinois	3

Regional Final
Stanford	3
Illinois	1

== Final Four - The Pit, Albuquerque, New Mexico ==
National semifinals
UCLA	3
Florida	0
Long Beach State	1
Stanford	3

National championship
UCLA	1
Stanford	3
