= 1996 NCAA Division I women's volleyball tournament =

Volleyball competition

1996 NCAA women's Division I volleyball tournament
- 1996 NCAA Final Four logo
- Champions: Stanford (3rd title)
- Runner-up: Hawaiʻi (5th NCAA (9th national) title match)
- Semifinalists: Nebraska (5th Final Four); Florida (3rd Final Four)
- Winning coach: Don Shaw (3rd title)
- Most outstanding player: Kerri Walsh (Stanford)
- Final Four All-Tournament Team: Kristin Folkl (Stanford); Lisa Sharpley (Stanford); Anjelica Ljungquist (Hawaiʻi); Robyn Ah Mow (Hawaiʻi); Lisa Reitsma (Nebraska)

The 1996 NCAA Division I women's volleyball tournament began with 48 teams and ended on December 21, 1996, when Stanford defeated Hawaiʻi 3 games to 0 in the NCAA championship match.

Stanford's win over Hawaiʻi for the title was, and remains, one of the most lopsided finals in NCAA championship history. Stanford won 15-7, 15-3, 15-5. The 15 points scored by Hawaiʻi was the lowest in an NCAA championship match since the NCAA tournament began in 1981.

== Play-in games ==
November 27
Coastal Carolina (BSC, 26-6)	3
Chattanooga (SoCon, 26-10)	0

November 27
Hofstra (A-East, 18-18)	3
Siena (MAAC, 21-8)	1

November 29
SE Missouri St. (OVC, 27-7)	3
Valparaiso (Mid-Cont., 26-8)	1

n/a
UCF (TAAC, 21-12)	3
Florida A&M (MEAC, 14-13)	0

n/a
Sam Houston (SLC, 24-14)	3
Grambling State (SWAC, ?)	0

n/a
Colgate (Patriot, 27-6)	3
Rider (Northeast, 16-12)	0

== Records ==
Pacific Regional
Seed	School	Conference	Berth Type	Record
	Cal State Northridge	Big Sky	Automatic	22-10
	Colorado State	WAC	At-large	22-10
	Houston	Conference USA	At-large	24-7
	Kansas State	Big 12	At-large	25-8
	Loyola Marymount	West Coast	Automatic	25-2
	Northern Illinois	Midwestern Collegiate	Automatic	27-7
	South Florida	Conference USA	Automatic	27-4
	Southeast Missouri State	Ohio Valley	Automatic	28-7
	Stanford	Pac-10	Automatic	26-2
	UC Santa Barbara	Big West	At-large	22-8
	USC	Pac-10	At-large	19-8
	Washington State	Pac-10	At-large	25-5

Mountain Regional
Seed	School	Conference	Berth Type	Record
	Arizona	Pac-10	At-large	19-9
	BYU	WAC	Automatic	25-6
	Colorado	Big 12	At-large	18-9
	Hawaii	WAC	At-large	31-2
	Oral Roberts	Independent	At-large	27-4
	Pacific	Big West	At-large	25-6
	Sam Houston State	Southland	Automatic	25-14
	San Diego	West Coast	At-large	22-7
	San Diego State	WAC	At-large	21-10
	Texas	Big 12	At-large	22-6
	Texas Tech	Big 12	At-large	25-8
	Washington	Pac-10	At-large	22-7

East Regional
Seed	School	Conference	Berth Type	Record
	Arkansas	SEC	At-large	24-10
	Brown	Ivy League	Automatic	20-13
	Coastal Carolina	Big South	Automatic	27-6
	Colgate	Patriot	Automatic	28-6
	George Mason	CAA	Automatic	26-2
	Georgia Tech	ACC	At-large	31-7
	Louisville	Conference USA	At-large	24-4
	Maryland	ACC	Automatic	26-4
	Nebraska	Big 12	Automatic	27-3
	Penn State	Big Ten	Auto (shared)	29-2
	Rhode Island	Atlantic 10	Automatic	31-6
	Wisconsin	Big Ten	At-large	23-7

Central Regional
Seed	School	Conference	Berth Type	Record
	Ark.-Little Rock	Sun Belt	Automatic	29-7
	Florida	SEC	Automatic	34-1
	Hofstra	America East	Automatic	19-18
	Illinois State	Missouri Valley	Automatic	28-7
	Long Beach State	Big West	Automatic	32-2
	Miami (OH)	Mid-American	Automatic	24-6
	Michigan State	Big Ten	Auto (shared)	24-6
	Minnesota	Big Ten	At-large	23-10
	Notre Dame	Big East	Automatic	21-11
	Ohio State	Big Ten	At-large	26-5
	Texas A&M	Big 12	At-large	24-7
	UCF	Trans America	Automatic	23-12

== Brackets ==
=== Pacific regional ===
First round
Houston	0
Colorado State	3
Southern California	3
SE Missouri State	0
UCSB	3
Northern Illinois	2
Cal St. Northridge	1
Kansas State	3

Second round
1	Stanford	3
Colorado State	0
Southern California	3
4	South Florida	1
3	Loyola Marymount	3
UCSB	1
Kansas State	0
2	Washington State	3

Regional semifinal
1	Stanford	3
Southern California	0
3	Loyola Marymount	1
2	Washington State	3

Regional Final
1	Stanford	3
2	Washington State	0

=== East regional ===
First round
Rhode Island	2
Arkansas	3
Louisville	3
Brown	0
Wisconsin	3
Colgate	0
Coastal Carolina	0
Georgia Tech	3

Second round
1	Nebraska	3
Arkansas	1
Louisville	3
4	Maryland	1
3	George Mason	1
Wisconsin	3
Georgia Tech	0
2	Penn State	3

Regional semifinal
1	Nebraska	3
Louisville	0
Wisconsin	0
2	Penn State	3

Regional Final
1	Nebraska	3
2	Penn State	2

=== Mountain regional ===
First round
Colorado	3
Oral Roberts	1
San Diego State	3
Sam Houston State	0
Washington	3
Texas Tech	0
San Diego	2
Arizona	3

Second round
1	Hawaiʻi	3
Colorado	0
San Diego State	0
4	Texas	3
3	BYU	3
Washington	1
Arizona	1
2	Pacific	3

Regional semifinal
1	Hawaiʻi	3
4	Texas	1
3	BYU	3
2	Pacific	2

Regional Final
1	Hawaiʻi	3
3	BYU	0

=== Central regional ===
First round
Illinois State	3
Miami (Oh.)	1
Notre Dame	3
Hofstra	0
Texas A&M	3
Arkansas-Little Rock	0
Central Florida	2
Minnesota	3

Second round
1	Florida	3
Illinois State	0
Notre Dame	2
4	Ohio State	3
3	Michigan State	3
Texas A&M	0
Minnesota	0
2	Long Beach State	3

Regional semifinal
1	Florida	3
4	Ohio State	2
3	Michigan State	3
2	Long Beach State	1

Regional Final
1	Florida	3
3	Michigan State	1

== Final Four - CSU Convocation Center, Cleveland, Ohio ==
National semifinals
1	Stanford	3
1	Nebraska	1
1	Hawaiʻi	3
1	Florida	0

National Championship
1	Stanford	3
1	Hawaiʻi	0
