= 1988 NCAA Division I women's volleyball tournament =

Volleyball competition

1988 NCAA women's Division I volleyball tournament
- 1988 NCAA Final Four logo
- Champions: Texas (1st NCAA (2nd national) title)
- Runner-up: Hawaiʻi (4th NCAA (8th national) title match)
- Semifinalists: UCLA (5th Final Four); Illinois (2nd Final Four)
- Winning coach: Mick Haley (1st title)
- Final Four All-Tournament Team: Stacie Nichols (Texas); Sue Schelfhout (Texas); Dawn Davenport (Texas); Martina Cincerova (Hawaiʻi); Teee Williams (Hawaiʻi); Mary Eggers (Illinois)

The 1988 NCAA Division I women's volleyball tournament began with 32 teams and ended on December 17, 1988, when Texas defeated Hawaiʻi 3 games to 0 in the NCAA championship match.

Texas won the school's first NCAA championship and became the first non-California or Hawaii university to win the NCAA national championship (Texas also won the last AIAW national championship). After upsetting previously unbeaten and top ranked UCLA in the national semifinals, Texas swept Hawaiʻi in the final by the scores of 15-4, 16-14, 15-13, and became the first school to win every NCAA tournament match in sweeps (3-0), as they went 15-0 in individual games.

== Brackets ==
=== West regional ===
First round
UCLA	3
California	0
Arizona	1
BYU	3
Washington	3
Arizona State	0
Southern California	0
Stanford	3

Regional semifinal
UCLA	3
BYU	0
Washington	3
Stanford	1

Regional Final
UCLA	3
Washington	0

=== South regional ===
First round
North Carolina	0
Texas	3
Colorado State	3
Florida State	1
New Mexico	1
Kentucky	3
UT Arlington	3
Pepperdine	0

Regional semifinal
Texas	3
Colorado State	0
Kentucky	0
UT Arlington	3

Regional Final
Texas	3
UT Arlington	0

=== Mideast regional ===
First round
Illinois	3
Illinois State	0
Penn State	1
Notre Dame	3
Oklahoma	3
Western Michigan	0
Weber State	2
Nebraska	3

Regional semifinal
Illinois	3
Notre Dame	1
Oklahoma	3
Nebraska	2

Regional Final
Illinois	3
Oklahoma	0

=== Northwest regional ===
First round
Long Beach State	3
UC Irvine	2
UC Santa Barbara	0
Pacific	3
San Diego State	3
San Jose State	1
Cal Poly	0
Hawaiʻi	3

Regional semifinal
Long Beach State	1
Pacific	3
San Diego State	0
Hawaiʻi	3

Regional Final
Pacific	1
Hawaiʻi	3

== Final Four - Williams Arena, Minneapolis, Minnesota ==
National semifinals December 15
UCLA	0
Texas	3
Illinois	1
Hawaiʻi	3

National championship December 17
Texas	3
Hawaiʻi	0
