= 2022 Texas Longhorns volleyball team =

American college volleyball season

2022 Texas Longhorns women's volleyball

NCAA national champion Big 12 Conference champion
- Conference: Big 12 Conference

Ranking
- Coaches: No. 1
- Record: 28–1 (15–1 Big 12)
- Head coach: Jerritt Elliott (22nd season)
- Assistant coaches: Erik Sullivan (12th season); David Hunt (1st season); Jessica Brannan (1st season)
- Home arena: Gregory Gym

The 2022 Texas Longhorns volleyball team represented the University of Texas at Austin in the 2022 NCAA Division I women's volleyball season. The Texas Longhorns women's volleyball team, led by 22nd year head coach Jerritt Elliott, played their home games at Gregory Gymnasium. The Longhorns were members of the Big 12 Conference.

The Longhorns won their 6th straight Big 12 championship, 15th overall, going 15–1 in conference play.

Texas defeated Louisville 3–0 in the NCAA tournament to win the team's third NCAA championship and fourth national title overall.

Longhorns outside hitter Logan Eggleston was named American Volleyball Coaches Association (AVCA) National Player of the Year, the first Texas player to receive the award. In addition, fellow Longhorns Zoe Fleck, Asjia O'Neal, Madisen Skinner, Saige Ka'aha'aina-Torres, and Molly Phillips were recognized as All-Americans alongside Eggleston.

== Roster ==
2022 Texas Longhorns Roster
Libero: 2 Emma Halter – Freshman; 10 Zoe Fleck – Senior; 12 Keonilei Akana – Sophomore; 19 Reilly Heinrich – Sophomore; Setter: 1 Jenna Ewert – (redshirt) Senior; 9 Saige Ka'aha'aina-Torres – Senior; 22 Marina Crownover – Freshman	Middle Blockers: 3 DeAndra Pierce – Sophomore; 5 Bella Bergmark – (redshirt) Junior; 7 Asjia O'Neal – (redshirt) Senior; 11 Marianna Singletary – Freshman; 28 Kayla Caffey – (redshirt) Senior	Outside Hitters: 4 Melanie Parra – Sophomore; 6 Madisen Skinner – Sophomore; 14 Kenna Miller – Freshman; 33 Logan Eggleston – Senior; 44 Devin Kahahawai – Freshman; Opposite Hitters: 15 Molly Phillips – Junior

=== Coaches ===
2022 Texas Longhorns Coaching Staff
- Jerritt Elliott – Head coach – 22nd year
- Erik Sullivan – Associate head coach/Technical coordinator – 12th year
- David Hunt – Associate head coach – 1st year
- Jessica Brannan – Volunteer assistant – 1st year

=== Support staff ===
2022 Texas Longhorns Coaching Staff
- Nathan Mendoza – Director of operations
- Jesse Sultzer – Video coordinator
- DeAnn Koehler – Senior Associate Athletic Trainer
- Donnie Maib – Assistant Athletics Director for Athletic Performance

== Schedule ==
Date Time	Opponent	Rank	Arena City (Tournament)	Television	Score	Attendance	Record (Big 12 Record)
August 26; 7:00 PM	at #7 Ohio State	#2	Covelli Center; Columbus, OH	W 3–0 (25–21, 25–22, 25–22)	FS1	3,711	1–0
August 27; 7:00 PM	at #7 Ohio State	#2	Covelli Center; Columbus, OH	W 3–1 (23–25, 25–18, 25–20, 25–13)	BTN	4,032	2–0
August 31; 7:00 PM	#4 Minnesota	#1	Gregory Gymnasium; Austin, TX	W 3–1 (25–21, 25–18, 23–25, 25–22)	LHN	4,992	3–0
September 4; 3:00 PM	at #12 Stanford	#1	Maples Pavilion; Stanford, CA	W 3–0 (25–18, 25–18, 25–20)	P12N	4,059	4–0
September 7; 7:00 PM	UC Davis	#1	Gregory Gymnasium; Austin, TX	W 3–0 (25–18, 25–19, 25–9)	LHN	3,178	5–0
September 9; 2:00 PM	Denver	#1	Gregory Gymnasium; Austin, TX	W 3–0 (25–20, 25–17, 25–22)	LHN	3,111	6–0
September 15; 8:00 PM	Houston	#1	Gregory Gymnasium; Austin, TX	W 3–1 (17–25, 25–16, 25–12, 25–22)	LHN	3,709	7–0
September 16; 7:00 PM	High Point	#1	Gregory Gymnasium; Austin, TX	W 3–0 (25–16, 25–18, 25–16)	LHN	3,652	8–0
September 21; 8:00 PM	at Kansas*	#1	Horejsi Family Volleyball Arena; Lawrence, KS	W 3–2 (23–25, 23–25, 25–18, 25–22, 15–9)	ESPN2	1,914	9–0 (1–0)
September 24; 7:00 PM	Oklahoma*	#1	Gregory Gymnasium; Austin, TX	W 3–0 (25–20, 25–21, 25–18)	LHN	4,343	10–0 (2–0)
October 2; 2:00 PM	at Texas Tech*	#1	United Supermarkets Arena; Lubbock, TX	W 3–0 (25–18, 25–19, 26–24)	ESPN	6,037	11–0 (3–0)
October 5; 7:00 PM	TCU*	#1	Gregory Gymnasium; Austin, TX	W 3–0 (25–20, 25–15, 25–17)	LHN	4,369	12–0 (4–0)
October 12; 7:00 PM	Kansas State*	#1	Gregory Gymnasium; Austin, TX	W 3–0 (25–16, 25–17, 25–13)	LHN	4,418	13–0 (5–0)
October 15; 2:00 PM	at #18 Baylor*	#1	Ferrell Center; Waco, TX	W 3–1 (25–19, 22–25, 25–17, 25–19)	ESPN+	5,604	14–0 (6–0)
October 19; 6:30 PM	at Iowa State*	#1	Hilton Coliseum; Ames, IA	L 2–3 (25–18, 25–27, 25–12, 25–27, 10–12)	ESPN+	2,240	14–1 (6–1)
October 22; 7:00 PM	West Virginia*	#1	Gregory Gymnasium; Austin, TX	W 3–0 (25–17, 25–16, 25–14)	LHN	4,475	15–1 (7–1)
October 26; 7:00 PM	Texas Tech*	#2	Gregory Gymnasium; Austin, TX	W 3–0 (25–18, 25–7, 25–9)	LHN	4,915	16–1 (8–1)
October 28; 6:30 PM	at Kansas State*	#2	Bramlage Coliseum; Manhattan, KS	W 3–1 (23–25, 25–13, 25–16, 25–21)	ESPN+	2,008	17–1 (9–1)
November 2; 6:00 PM	at TCU*	#1	Schollmaier Arena; Fort Worth, TX	W TCU forfeited due to non-Covid illness in team			17–1 (10–1)
November 9; 7:00 PM	Iowa State*	#1	Gregory Gymnasium; Austin, TX	W 3–0 (25–23, 25–19, 25–19)	LHN	4,888	18–1 (11–1)
November 12; 6:00 PM	at Oklahoma*	#1	McCasland Field House; Norman, OK	W 3–0 (25–14, 25–19, 25–10)	ESPN+	3,702	19–1 (12–1)
November 16; 6:00 PM	Kansas*	#1	Gregory Gymnasium; Austin, TX	W 3–0 (25–16, 25–18, 26–24)	LHN	4,679	20–1 (13–1)
November 19; 7:00 PM	#15 Baylor*	#1	Gregory Gymnasium; Austin, TX	W 3–1 (25–19, 19–25, 25–23, 25–23)	LHN	4,648	21–1 (14–1)
November 23; 1:00 PM	at West Virginia*	#1	WVU Coliseum; Morgantown, WV	W 3–0 (25–18, 25–16, 25–11)		1,075	22–1 (15–1)
2022 NCAA Tournament
December 1; 8:00 PM	Fairleigh Dickinson	#1	Gregory Gymnasium; Austin, TX (NCAA First Rounds)	W 3–0 (25–6, 25–13, 25–13)	LHN	4,172	23–1
December 2; 8:00 PM	Georgia	#1	Gregory Gymnasium; Austin, TX (NCAA Second Rounds)	W 3–0 (25–14, 25–16, 25–15)	ESPN+	4,812	24–1
December 8; 1:55 PM	#16 Marquette	#1	Gregory Gymnasium; Austin, TX (NCAA Regional Semifinal)	W 3–1 (25–14, 25–13, 19–25, 25–17)	ESPN2	4,491	25–1
December 10; 5:00 PM	#10 Ohio State	#1	Gregory Gymnasium; Austin, TX (NCAA Regional Final)	W 3–1 (25–18, 21–25, 25–13, 25–21)	ESPNU	5,344	26–1
December 15; 6:00 PM	vs. #3 San Diego	#1	CHI Health Center Omaha; Omaha, NE (NCAA Semifinal)	W 3–1 (26–28, 25–16, 25–15, 25–20)	ESPN		27–1
December 17; 7:00 PM	vs. #1 Louisville	#1	CHI Health Center Omaha; Omaha, NE (NCAA Final)	W 3–0 (25–22, 25–14, 26–24)	ESPN2	16,952	28–1
* Indicates Conference Opponent, Times listed are Central Time Zone, Source
