= 2023 Texas Longhorns volleyball team =

American college volleyball season

2023 Texas Longhorns women's volleyball

NCAA national champion Big 12 Conference champion
- Conference: Big 12 Conference

Ranking
- Coaches: No. 1
- Record: 28–4 (15–1 Big 12)
- Head coach: Jerritt Elliott (23rd season)
- Assistant coaches: Erik Sullivan (13th season); David Hunt (2nd season); Jessica Brannan (2nd season)
- Home arena: Gregory Gymnasium

2023 Big 12 Conference volleyball standings
	Conf.				Overall
Team	W		L	PCT	W		L	PCT
No. 5 Texas ‍†‍‍^{y}	15	–	1	.938	20	–	4	.833
No. 13 BYU ‍‍‍^{y}	11	–	4	.733	22	–	5	.815
No. 17 Kansas ‍‍‍^{y}	11	–	4	.733	20	–	5	.800
No. 21 Houston ‍‍‍^{y}	10	–	5	.667	17	–	7	.708
Iowa State ‍‍‍^{y}	8	–	7	.533	17	–	9	.654
UCF ‍‍‍	8	–	7	.533	17	–	9	.654
Kansas State ‍‍‍	8	–	7	.533	14	–	10	.583
No. 23 Baylor ‍‍‍^{y}	8	–	8	.500	14	–	12	.538
TCU ‍‍‍^{y}	8	–	9	.471	15	–	13	.536
Cincinnati ‍‍‍	4	–	10	.286	11	–	13	.458
Texas Tech ‍‍‍	3	–	11	.214	10	–	16	.385
Oklahoma ‍‍‍	2	–	12	.143	9	–	15	.375
West Virginia ‍‍‍	2	–	13	.133	9	–	19	.321
† – Conference champion y – Invited to the NCAA Tournament; Rankings from AVCA; Source:Big 12 Conference

The 2023 Texas Longhorns volleyball team represented the University of Texas at Austin in the 2023 NCAA Division I women's volleyball season. The Texas Longhorns women's volleyball team, led by 23rd year head coach Jerritt Elliott, play their home games at Gregory Gymnasium. The Longhorns are members of the Big 12.

Texas is coming off a 28–1 season, winning the Big 12 Conference championship and the 2022 NCAA national championship.

== Offseason ==
=== Outgoing departures ===
Name	Number	Pos.	Height	Year	Hometown	Reason for departure
Jenna Ewert	1	S	5'10"	Redshirt Senior	Antioch, CA	Graduated
Kayla Caffey	28	MB	6'0"	Redshirt Senior	Chicago, IL	Graduated
Logan Eggleston	33	OH	6'2"	Senior	Brentwood, TN	Graduated
Saige Ka'aha'aina-Torres	9	S	6'0"	Senior	Honolulu, HI	Graduated
Zoe Fleck	10	L	5'6"	Senior	Granada Hills, CA	Graduated

=== Outgoing transfers ===
Name	Pos.	Height	Year	Hometown	New Team	Source
Melanie Parra	OH	5'11”	Sophomore	Culiacán, Sinaloa, México	TCU	

=== Incoming transfers ===
Name	Pos.	Height	Year	Hometown	Previous Team	Source
Jenna Wenaas	OH	6'1”	Junior	Frisco, TX	Minnesota	

=== Incoming recruits ===
2023 Texas Recruits
Name	Pos.	Height	Hometown	High School
Auburn Tomkinson	RS	6’5"	Carlsbad, CA	Carlsbad High School
Ella Swindle	S	6’3"	Columbia, MO	Rock Bridge High School
Jordyn Byrd	OH	6’4"	Bradenton, FL	Cardinal Mooney Catholic
Nya Bunton	MB	6’3"	Louisville, KY	duPont Manual High School
Sydney Helmers	OH	6’4"	Louisville, KY	Assumption High School

== Roster ==
2023 Texas Longhorns Roster
Libero: 2 Emma Halter – Sophomore; 10 Carissa Barnes - (redshirt) Senior; 12 Keonilei Akana – Junior; 19 Reilly Heinrich – Junior; Setter: 1 Ella Swindle - Freshman; 22 Marina Crownover – (redshirt) Freshman	Middle Blockers: 5 Bella Bergmark – Senior; 7 Asjia O'Neal – (redshirt) Senior; 11 Marianna Singletary – (redshirt) Freshman; 55 Nya Bunton - Freshman	Outside Hitters: 4 Sydney Helmers - Freshman; 6 Madisen Skinner – Junior; 9 Kenna Miller - (redshirt) Freshman; 13 Jenna Wenaas – Junior; 14 Jordyn Byrd - Freshman; 44 Devin Kahahawai – Sophomore; Opposite Hitters: 8 Auburn Tomkinson - Freshman; 15 Molly Phillips – Senior

=== Coaches ===
2023 Texas Longhorns Coaching Staff
- Jerritt Elliott – Head coach – 23rd year
- Erik Sullivan – Associate head coach/Technical coordinator – 13th year
- David Hunt – Associate head coach – 2nd year
- Cursty Le Roux – Assistant coach – 1st year

=== Support staff ===
2023 Texas Longhorns Coaching Staff
- Nathan Mendoza – Director of operations
- DeAnn Koehler – Senior Associate Athletic Trainer
- Donnie Maib – Assistant Athletics Director for Athletic Performance

== Schedule ==
Date Time	Opponent	Rank	Arena City (Tournament)	Television	Score	Attendance	Record (Big 12 Record)
Exhibition
August 12; 11:00 AM	Texas orange & White	–	Gregory Gymnasium; Austin, TX	LHN	2–2 (13–25, 20–25, 25–23, 25–17)	N/A	0–0
August 18; 6:00 PM	Texas A&M–Corpus Christi	#1	Gregory Gymnasium; Austin, TX	LHN	W 5–0 (25–20, 25–10, 25–12, 25–19, 15–8)	N/A	0–0
Regular Season
August 25; 8:00 PM	at Long Beach State	#1	Walter Pyramid; Long Beach, CA	ESPN+	L 1–3 (22–25, 25–18, 16–25, 22–25)	3,579	0–1
August 26; 3:00 PM	vs Loyola Marymount	#1	Walter Pyramid; Long Beach, CA	ESPN+	W 3–0 (25–22, 25–22, 25–19)	857	1–1
August 29; 7:00 PM	at #5 Minnesota	#7	Maturi Pavilion; Minneapolis, MN	B1G	W 3–1 (25–14, 23–25, 25–17, 25–23)	5,253	2–1
September 3; 11:30 AM	#2 Stanford	#7	Gregory Gymnasium; Austin, TX	ESPN2	L 0–3 (23–25, 20–25, 15–25)	4,707	2–2
September 8; 5:00 PM	Florida Gulf Coast	#7	Gregory Gymnasium; Austin, TX	LHN	W 3–0 (25–19, 25–18, 25–13)	4,544	3–2
September 11; 6:00 PM	Rice	#6	Gregory Gymnasium; Austin, TX	LHN	W 3–0 (25–16, 25–21, 25–15)	4,410	4–2
September 14; 7:00 PM	#19 Ohio State	#6	Gregory Gymnasium; Austin, TX	LHN	W 3–1 (25–27, 25–13, 25–14, 25–23)	4,433	5–2
September 15; 7:00 PM	#11 Washington State	#6	Gregory Gymnasium; Austin, TX	LHN	L 1–3 (25–21, 22–25, 22–25, 22–25)	4,656	5–3
September 22; 6:00 PM	at Oklahoma*	#9	McCasland Field House; Norman, OK	ESPN+	W 3–0 (28–26, 25–18, 30–28)	1,761	6–3
September 23; 6:00 PM	at Oklahoma*	#9	McCasland Field House; Norman, OK	ESPN+	W 3–0 (25–22, 25–13, 25–12)	2,228	7–3
September 28; 8:00 PM	#9 BYU*	#10	Gregory Gymnasium; Austin, TX	FS1	W 3–1 (13–25, 25–20, 25–15, 25–20)	4,844	8–3
September 29; 7:00 PM	#9 BYU*	#10	Gregory Gymnasium; Austin, TX	LHN	W 3–1 (26–28, 25–13, 25–22, 25–20)	4,667	9–3
October 5; 7:00 PM	#17 Kansas*	#8	Gregory Gymnasium; Austin, TX	LHN	W 3–1 (25–17, 16–25, 25–18, 25–22)	4,508	10–3
October 6; 7:00 PM	#17 Kansas*	#8	Gregory Gymnasium; Austin, TX	LHN	W 3–0 (25–16, 25–15, 25–18)	4,338	11–3
October 13; 1:00 PM	at #21 Houston*	#7	Fertitta Center; Houston, TX	ESPN+	W 3–1 (25–21, 17–25, 25–23, 25–17)	7,054	12–3
October 14; 12:00 PM	at #21 Houston*	#7	Fertitta Center; Houston, TX	ESPN2	W 3–0 (25–10, 25–19, 25–23)	7,051	13–3
October 18; 7:00 PM	at TCU*	#6	University Rec Center; Fort Worth, TX	ESPNU	W 3–2 (14–25, 25–22, 21–25, 25–23, 15–13)	7,412	14–3
October 26; 7:00 PM	#20 Baylor*	#5	Gregory Gymnasium; Austin, TX	FS1	W 3–2 (21–25, 27–29, 25–11, 25–11, 15–10)	4,590	15–3
October 27; 7:00 PM	#20 Baylor*	#5	Gregory Gymnasium; Austin, TX	LHN	W 3–0 (27–25, 25–19, 25–15)	4,276	16–3
November 2; 5:00 PM	at West Virginia*	#4	WVU Coliseum; Morgantown, WV	ESPN+	W 3–0 (25–21, 25–18, 25–19)	1,075	17–3
November 3; 4:30 PM	at West Virginia*	#4	WVU Coliseum; Morgantown, WV	ESPN+	W 3–0 (25–13, 25–17, 25–17)	825	18–3
November 8; 6:30 PM	at Kansas State*	#3	Bramlage Coliseum; Manhattan, KS	ESPN+	L 0–3 (22–25, 22–25, 21–25)	3,044	18–4
November 11; 7:00 PM	Cincinnati*	#3	Gregory Gymnasium; Austin, TX	LHN	W 3–0 (25–13, 25–14, 25–13)	4,480	19–4
November 15; 6:00 PM	Iowa State*	#5	Gregory Gymnasium; Austin, TX	LHN	W 3–1 (25–14, 24–26, 25–18, 25–20)	4,649	20–4
November 18; 1:00 PM	at UCF*	#5	The Venue at UCF; Orlando, FL	ESPN+	W 3–0 (25–20, 25–22, 25–23)	1,887	21–4
November 25; 1:00 PM	Texas Tech*	#4	Gregory Gymnasium; Austin, TX	LHN	W 3–0 (25–17, 25–14, 25–14)	4,725	22–4
2023 NCAA Tournament
November 30; 6:00 PM	Texas A&M	#2	Gregory Gymnasium; Austin, TX (NCAA First Round)	LHN	W 3–1 (21–25, 25–13, 25–20, 25–20)	4,122	23–4
December 1; 7:00 PM	#7 SMU	#2	Gregory Gymnasium; Austin, TX (NCAA Second Round)	LHN	W 3–0 (25–16, 25–14, 25–17)	3,978	24–4
December 7; 8:00 PM	#3 Tennessee	#2	Maples Pavilion; Stanford, CA (NCAA Palo Alto Regional Semifinal)	ESPN2	W 3–2 (25–19, 20–25, 23–25, 26–24, 16–14)	2,483	25–4
December 9; 9:00 PM	#1 Stanford	#2	Maples Pavilion; Stanford, CA (NCAA Palo Alto Regional Final)	ESPNU	W 3–1 (25–16, 15–25, 25–19, 25–22)	4,312	26–4
December 14; 8:30 PM	#1 Wisconsin	#2	Amalie Arena; Tampa, FL (NCAA Semifinal)	ESPN	W 3–1 (25–22, 20–25, 25–13, 25–16)	19,958	27–4
December 17; 2:00 PM	#1 Nebraska	#2	Amalie Arena; Tampa, FL (NCAA Final)	ABC	W 3–0 (25–22, 25–14, 25–11)	19,727	28–4
* Indicates Conference Opponent, Times listed are Central Time Zone, Source
