= 2024 Texas Longhorns volleyball team =

American college volleyball season

2024 Texas Longhorns women's volleyball

NCAA regional semifinal
- Conference: Southeastern Conference
- Record: 20–7 (13–3 SEC)
- Head coach: Jerritt Elliott (24th season)
- Assistant coaches: Erik Sullivan (14th season); David Hunt (3rd season); Reily Buechler Canter (1st season)
- Home arena: Gregory Gymnasium

2024 Southeastern Conference volleyball standings
	Conf.				Overall
Team	W		L	PCT	W		L	PCT
No. 11 Kentucky ‍†‍‍^{y}	14	–	2	.875	23	–	8	.742
No. 13 Texas ‍‍‍^{y}	13	–	3	.813	20	–	7	.741
No. 22 Florida ‍‍‍^{y}	11	–	5	.688	23	–	8	.742
No. 25 Missouri ‍‍‍^{y}	11	–	5	.688	22	–	9	.710
Texas A&M ‍‍‍^{y}	10	–	6	.625	21	–	8	.724
Oklahoma ‍‍‍^{y}	8	–	8	.500	15	–	11	.577
Tennessee ‍‍‍^{y}	8	–	8	.500	15	–	12	.556
Ole Miss ‍‍‍^{y}	7	–	9	.438	18	–	12	.600
South Carolina ‍‍‍^{y}	7	–	9	.438	16	–	12	.571
LSU ‍‍‍	7	–	9	.438	15	–	12	.556
Arkansas ‍‍‍	6	–	10	.375	16	–	12	.571
Georgia ‍‍‍	6	–	10	.375	12	–	14	.462
Mississippi State ‍‍‍	5	–	11	.313	11	–	14	.440
Auburn ‍‍‍	4	–	12	.250	14	–	13	.519
Alabama ‍‍‍	3	–	13	.188	11	–	16	.407
† – Conference champion y – Invited to the NCAA Tournament; Rankings from AVCA; Source:

The 2024 Texas Longhorns volleyball team represents the University of Texas at Austin in the 2024 NCAA Division I women's volleyball season. The Texas Longhorns women's volleyball team, led by 24th year head coach Jerritt Elliott, play their home games at Gregory Gymnasium. The Longhorns are members of the SEC.

Texas is coming off a 28–4 season, winning the Big 12 Conference championship and the 2023 NCAA national championship.

== Offseason ==
=== Outgoing departures ===
Name	Number	Pos.	Height	Year	Hometown	Reason for departure
Asjia O'Neal	7	MB	6'3"	Senior	Southlake, TX	Graduated
Bella Bergmark	5	MB	6'2"	Senior	Larkspur, CA	Graduated
Carissa Barnes	10	L	5'7"	Redshirt Senior	Weatherford, TX	Graduated
Molly Phillips	15	OPP	6'5"	Senior	Mansfield, TX	Graduated

=== Outgoing transfers ===
Name	Pos.	Height	Year	Hometown	New Team	Source
Marina Crownover	S	5'10”	Redshirt Freshman	Austin, TX	Missouri	

=== Incoming transfers ===
Name	Pos.	Height	Year	Hometown	Previous Team	Source
Averi Carlson	S	5'11”	Junior	Lucas, TX	Baylor	
Reagan Rutherford	OPP	6'0”	Redshirt Senior	Missouri City, TX	Kentucky	
Soah Franklin	MB	6'1”	Senior	Los Angeles, CA	Columbia	
Whitney Lauenstein	OH	6'2”	Redshirt Junior	Waverly, NE	Nebraska	

=== Incoming recruits ===
2023 Texas Recruits
Name	Pos.	Height	Hometown	High School
Ayden Ames	MB	6'4"	Prosper, TX	Prosper High School
Reese Emerick	L	5'9"	Austin, TX	Westlake High School

== Roster ==
2024 Texas Longhorns Roster
Libero: 2 Emma Halter – Junior; 12 Keonilei Akana – Senior; 19 Reilly Heinrich – Senior; 27 Reese Emerick – Freshman; Setter: 1 Ella Swindle - Sophomore; 17 Averi Carlson - Junior	Middle Blockers: 5 Ayden Ames - Freshman; 11 Marianna Singletary – (redshirt) Sophomore; 55 Nya Bunton - (redshirt) Freshman	Outside Hitters: 4 Sydney Helmers - (redshirt) Freshman; 6 Madisen Skinner – Senior; 7 Jordyn Byrd - (redshirt) Freshman; 9 Kenna Miller - (redshirt) Sophomore; 13 Jenna Wenaas – Senior; 26 Whitney Lauenstein – (redshirt) Junior; 44 Devin Kahahawai – Junior; Opposite Hitters: 8 Auburn Tomkinson - (redshirt) Freshman; 14 Reagan Rutherford - (redshirt) Senior

=== Coaches ===
2024 Texas Longhorns Coaching Staff
- Jerritt Elliott – Head coach – 24th year
- Erik Sullivan – Associate head coach/Technical coordinator – 14th year
- David Hunt – Associate head coach – 3rd year
- Reily Buechler Canter – Assistant coach – 1st year

=== Support staff ===
2024 Texas Longhorns Coaching Staff
- Nathan Mendoza – Director of operations
- DeAnn Koehler – Senior Associate Athletic Trainer
- Donnie Maib – Assistant Athletics Director for Athletic Performance

== Schedule ==
Date Time	Opponent	Rank	Arena City (Tournament)	Television	Score	Attendance	Record (SEC Record)
Regular Season
September 1; 11:30 a.m.	vs. #3 Wisconsin	#1	Fiserv Forum; Milwaukee, WI (State Farm Volleyball Showcase)	FOX	W 3–1 (30–28, 23–25, 25–15, 25–11)	N/A	1–0
September 2; 6:30 p.m.	vs. #18 Minnesota	#1	Fiserv Forum; Milwaukee, WI (State Farm Volleyball Showcase)	FS1	L 2–3 (25–22, 19–25, 20–25, 25–13, 7–15)	8,213	1–1
September 5; 8:00 p.m.	vs. Indiana	#1	Gregory Gymnasium; Austin, TX	SECN	W 3–0 (25–8, 25–21, 25–22)	4,451	2–1
September 7; 4:00 p.m.	vs. Miami	#1	Gregory Gymnasium; Austin, TX	SECN+	L 2–3 (25–19, 25–17, 24–26, 18–25, 11–15)	4,416	2–2
September 11; 8:00 p.m.	vs. Houston	#6	Gregory Gymnasium; Austin, TX	ESPN2	W 3–0 (25–19, 25–18, 25–20)	4,719	3–2
September 15; 2:00 p.m.	at #2 Stanford	#6	Maples Pavilion; Stanford, CA	ESPN	L 0–3 (16–25, 21–25, 22–25)	6,894	3–3
September 18; 8:00 p.m.	at #20 Baylor	#8	Ferrell Center; Waco, TX	ESPN	W 3–0 (25–17, 25–23, 26–24)	3,126	4–3
September 20; 6:30 p.m.	vs. Hawaii	#8	Gregory Gymnasium; Austin, TX	SECN+	W 3–1 (25–14, 23–25, 25–17, 25–19)	4,531	5–3
September 27; 6:00 p.m.	at Texas A&M*	#8	Reed Arena; College Station, TX	SECN	W 3–1 (25–16, 14–25, 25–23, 25–20)	9,236	6–3 (1–0)
September 29; 2:00 p.m.	at LSU*	#8	Pete Maravich Assembly Center; Baton Rouge, LA	SECN	W 3–0 (25–20, 25–20, 25–15)	3,885	7–3 (2–0)
October 2; 6:30 p.m.	vs. South Carolina*	#7	Gregory Gymnasium; Austin, TX	SECN+	W 3–0 (25–23, 25–23, 25–21)	4,738	8–3 (3–0)
October 6; 12:00 p.m.	at #18 Florida*	#7	O'Connell Center; Gainesville, FL	ESPN	W 3–0 (25–23, 25–18, 25–14)	9,255	9–3 (4–0)
October 13; 12:00 p.m.	at #12 Kentucky*	#7	Memorial Coliseum; Lexington, KY	ESPN	W 3–0 (25–21, 25–19, 25–17)	4,834	10–3 (5–0)
October 18; 8:00 p.m.	vs. Arkansas*	#7	Gregory Gymnasium; Austin, TX	SECN+	W 3–0 (25–20, 25–17, 25–22)	4,648	11–3 (6–0)
October 20; 1:00 p.m.	vs. Georgia*	#7	Gregory Gymnasium; Austin, TX	SECN+	W 3–1 (23–25, 25–19, 25–20, 25–18)	4,440	12–3 (7–0)
October 23; 7:00 p.m.	vs. Texas A&M*	#7	Gregory Gymnasium; Austin, TX	ESPNU	L 2–3 (27–25, 14–25, 25–23, 21–25, 16–18)	4,576	12–4 (7–1)
November 1; 8:00 p.m.	vs. Missouri*	#9	Gregory Gymnasium; Austin, TX	SECN	L 2–3 (25–21, 19–25, 25–17, 24–26, 10–15)	4,467	12–5 (7–2)
November 3; 1:00 p.m.	vs. Oklahoma*	#9	Gregory Gymnasium; Austin, TX	SECN+	L 2–3 (21–25, 27–25, 25–19, 17–25, 9–15)	4,459	12–6 (7–3)
November 6; 6:00 p.m.	at Mississippi State*	#15	Newell-Grissom Volleyball; Starkville, MS	SECN+	W 3–1 (25–8, 25–15, 21–25, 25–17)	1,657	13–6 (8–3)
November 15; 6:30 p.m.	at Auburn*	#14	Neville Arena; Auburn, AL	SECN+	W 3–0 (25–11, 25–21, 25–15)	3,940	14–6 (9–3)
November 17; 12:00 p.m.	at Alabama*	#14	Foster Auditorium; Tuscaloosa, AL	ESPN	W 3–0 (25–16, 25–23, 25–15)	3,800	15–6 (10–3)
November 22; 6:00 p.m.	at Oklahoma*	#14	McCasland Field House; Norman, OK	SECN+	W 3–0 (25–14, 25–15, 25–19)	3,325	16–6 (11–3)
November 27; 7:00 p.m.	vs. Tennessee*	#14	Gregory Gymnasium; Austin, TX	SECN	W 3–0 (25–20, 25–14, 25–20)	4,180	17–6 (12–3)
November 30; 11:00 a.m.	vs. Ole Miss*	#14	Gregory Gymnasium; Austin, TX	SECN+	W 3–2 (26–28, 27–25, 25–23, 21–25, 17–15)	3,819	18–6 (13–3)
2024 NCAA Tournament
December 5; 6:30 p.m.	Texas A&M–Corpus Christi	#13	Gregory Gymnasium; Austin, TX (NCAA First Round)	ESPN+	W 3–0 (25–11, 25–23, 25–12)	3,918	19–6
December 6; 6:30 p.m.	#19 USC	#13	Gregory Gymnasium; Austin, TX (NCAA Second Round)	ESPN+	W 3–0 (26–24, 25–20, 25–22)	4,137	20–6
December 12; 12:00 p.m.	#6 Creighton	#13	Rec Hall; University Park, PA (NCAA State College Regional Semifinal)	ESPN2	L 1–3 (26–24, 19–25, 21–25, 20–25)	N/A	20–7
* Indicates Conference Opponent, Times listed are Central Time Zone, Source

== Awards and honors ==
=== Conference honors ===
All-SEC Team
Player	Position	Class	Team	Ref.
Madisen Skinner	OH	Senior	1st	
Marianna Singletary	MB	Redshirt Sophomore	1st	
Reagan Rutherford	OPP	Redshirt Senior	2nd	
Ayden Ames	MB	Freshman	All-Freshman Team	
