= 2025 Texas Longhorns volleyball team =

American college volleyball season

2025 Texas Longhorns women's volleyball
- Conference: Southeastern Conference
- Record: 0–0 (0–0 SEC)
- Head coach: Jerritt Elliott (25th season)
- Assistant coaches: Erik Sullivan (15th season); David Hunt (4th season)
- Home arena: Gregory Gym

The 2025 Texas Longhorns volleyball team represents the University of Texas at Austin in the 2025 NCAA Division I women's volleyball season. The Texas Longhorns women's volleyball team, led by 25th year head coach Jerritt Elliott, play their home games at Gregory Gymnasium. The Longhorns are members of the SEC.

== Offseason ==
=== Outgoing departures ===
Name	Number	Pos.	Height	Year	Hometown	Reason for departure
Jenna Wenaas	13	OH	6'1"	Senior	Frisco, TX	Graduated
Keonilei Akana	12	L	5'9"	Senior	Hauula, HI	Graduated
Madisen Skinner	6	OH	6'2"	Senior	Katy, TX	Graduated
Reagan Rutherford	10	OPP	6'0"	Redshirt Senior	Missouri City, TX	Graduated
Soah Franklin	23	MB	6'2"	Redshirt Senior	Los Angeles, CA	Graduated

=== Outgoing transfers ===
Name	Pos.	Height	Year	Hometown	New Team	Source
Auburn Tomkinson	OPP	6'5”	Redshirt Freshman	Carlsbad, CA	Illinois	
Averi Carlson	S	5'11”	Junior	Lucas, TX	SMU	
Brennan Ramirez	L	5'1”	Freshman	Waxahachie, TX	Abilene Christian	
Jordyn Byrd	OH	6'4”	Redshirt Freshman	Bradenton, FL	Florida	
Sydney Helmers	OH	6'4”	Redshirt Freshman	Louisville, KY	Notre Dame	

=== Incoming transfers ===
Name	Pos.	Height	Year	Hometown	Previous Team	Source
Anja Kujundzic	L	5'5”	Junior	Ljig, SER	VCU	
Ramsey Gary	L	5'7”	Junior	Pendleton, IN	Indiana	
Torrey Stafford	OH	6'2”	Junior	Torrance, CA	Pittsburgh	

=== Incoming recruits ===
2023 Texas Recruits
Name	Pos.	Height	Hometown	High School
Abby Vander Wal	OH	6'3"	Elmhurst, IL	Timothy Christian School
Addy Gaido	OH	6'4"	Georgetown, TX	Georgetown High School
Callie Krueger	DS/L	5'5"	Dripping Springs, TX	Dripping Springs High School
Macaria Spears	OH	6'3"	Frisco, TX	Prestonwood Christian Academy

== Roster ==
2025 Texas Longhorns Roster
Libero: 2 Emma Halter – Senior; 12 Callie Krueger – Freshman; 16 Anja Kujundzic – Junior; 27 Reese Emerick – Sophomore; 32 Ramsey Gary – Junior; Setter: 1 Ella Swindle - Junior; 3 Rella Binney - Sophomore	Middle Blockers: 5 Ayden Ames - Sophomore; 11 Marianna Singletary – (redshirt) Junior; 55 Nya Bunton - (redshirt) Sophomore	Outside Hitters: 4 Torrey Stafford - Junior; 6 Abby Vander Wal - Freshman; 9 Kenna Miller - (redshirt) Junior; 14 Addy Gaido – Freshman; 23 Macaria Spears – Freshman; 26 Whitney Lauenstein – (redshirt) Senior; 44 Devin Kahahawai – Senior

=== Coaches ===
2025 Texas Longhorns Coaching Staff
- Jerritt Elliott – head coach – 25th year
- Erik Sullivan – associate head coach and technical coordinator – 15th year
- David Hunt – associate head coach – 4th year

=== Support staff ===
2025 Texas Longhorns Coaching Staff
- Nathan Mendoza – director of operations
- DeAnn Koehler – senior associate athletic trainer
- Donnie Maib – assistant athletics director for athletic performance

== Schedule ==
Date Time	Opponent	Rank	Arena City (Tournament)	Television	Score	Attendance	Record (SEC Record)
Regular Season
September 1	vs. Wisconsin		Milwaukee, WI				0–0
* Indicates Conference Opponent, Times listed are Central Time Zone, Source
