= 2023 NCAA Division I women's volleyball tournament =

Volleyball competition

2023 NCAA women's Division I volleyball tournament
- 2023 NCAA Division I Championship
- Finals site: Amalie Arena; Tampa, Florida
- Champions: Texas (4th NCAA (5th national) title)
- Runner-up: Nebraska (11th title match)
- Semifinalists: Pittsburgh (3rd Final Four); Wisconsin (6th Final Four)
- Winning coach: Jerritt Elliott (3rd title)
- Most outstanding player: Madisen Skinner (Texas)
- Final Four All-Tournament Team: Asjia O'Neal (Texas); Emma Halter (Texas); Ella Swindle (Texas); Merritt Beason (Nebraska); Bekka Allick (Nebraska); Anna Smrek (Wisconsin)

The 2023 NCAA Division I women's volleyball tournament was a single-elimination tournament of 64 teams that determined the National Collegiate Athletic Association (NCAA) Division I women's volleyball national champion for the 2023 season. It was the 43rd edition of the tournament. It began on November 30, 2023, in various college campuses across the country, location determinations were chosen based on participating teams seedings. The tournament concluded with the championship game at Amalie Arena in Tampa, Florida on December 17 when Texas defeated Nebraska 3–0. The win gave Texas its 5th national title and second consecutive national title.

== Tournament schedule and venues ==
2023 NCAA First and Second Round venues

First and Second Rounds (Subregionals)

- November 30 – December 2
  - Bob Devaney Sports Center, Lincoln, Nebraska (Host: University of Nebraska–Lincoln)
  - Maples Pavilion, Palo Alto, California (Host: Stanford University)
  - UW Field House, Madison, Wisconsin (Host: University of Wisconsin)
  - Petersen Events Center, Pittsburgh, Pennsylvania (Host: University of Pittsburgh)
  - Gregory Gymnasium, Austin, Texas (Host: University of Texas)
  - KFC Yum! Center, Louisville, Kentucky (Host: University of Louisville)
  - Matthew Knight Arena, Eugene, Oregon (Host: University of Oregon)
  - Sokol Arena, Omaha, Nebraska (Host: Creighton University)
  - Barnhill Arena, Fayetteville, Arkansas (Host: University of Arkansas
  - O'Connell Center, Gainesville, Florida (Host: University of Florida)
  - Bohler Gymnasium, Pullman, Washington (Host: Washington State University)
  - Memorial Coliseum, Lexington, Kentucky (Host: University of Kentucky)
  - Holloway Gymnasium, West Lafayette, Indiana (Host: Purdue University)
  - Horejsi Family Volleyball Arena, Lawrence, Kansas (Host: University of Kansas)
  - Smith Fieldhouse, Provo, Utah (Host: BYU)
  - Food City Center, Knoxville, TN (Host: University of Tennessee)
2023 NCAA Regionals and Final Four

Regional semifinals and finals

- December 7 & 9
  - Lincoln Regional, Devaney Center, Lincoln, Nebraska (Host: University of Nebraska–Lincoln)
  - Palo Alto Regional, Maples Pavilion (Host: Stanford University)
  - Madison Regional, Wisconsin Field House (Host: University of Wisconsin)
  - Pittsburgh Regional, Fitzgerald Field House, Pittsburgh, Pennsylvania (Host: University of Pittsburgh)

National semifinals and championship

- December 14 & 17
  - Amalie Arena, Tampa, Florida (Host: University of South Florida)

== Qualifying teams ==
=== Automatic qualifiers ===
The following teams received automatic bids to the tournament by winning either the regular season conference title or their conference tournament.

| Conference | Team | Conference Record |
|---|---|---|
| ACC | Florida State | 16–2 |
| America East | UMBC | 8–2 |
| American | SMU | 18–1 |
| Atlantic 10 | Dayton | 18–0 |
| Atlantic Sun | Florida Gulf Coast | 15–1 |
| Big 12 | Texas | 17–1 |
| Big East | Creighton | 16–2 |
| Big Sky | Weber State | 11–5 |
| Big South | High Point | 14–0 |
| Big Ten | Nebraska | 19–1 |
| Big West | Hawaiʻi | 14–4 |
| Coastal | Delaware | 15–3 |
| C-USA | Western Kentucky | 16–0 |
| Horizon | Wright State | 15–3 |
| Ivy | Yale | 14–0 |
| MAAC | Fairfield | 16–2 |
| MAC | Western Michigan | 18–0 |
| MEAC | Coppin State | 13–1 |
| Missouri Valley | Northern Iowa | 18–0 |
| Mountain West | Fresno State | 10–8 |
| Northeast | LIU | 9–5 |
| Ohio Valley | Eastern Illinois | 15–3 |
| Pac-12 | Stanford | 19–1 |
| Patriot | Colgate | 13–3 |
| SEC | Kentucky | 17–1 |
| Southern | Wofford | 11–5 |
| Southland | Southeastern Louisiana | 17–1 |
| SWAC | Jackson State | 10–6 |
| Summit | Omaha | 12–4 |
| Sun Belt | Coastal Carolina | 14–2 |
| West Coast | Pepperdine | 15–1 |
| WAC | Grand Canyon | 13–3 |

=== Tournament seeds ===
Lincoln Regional
| Seed | RPI | School | Conference | Berth type | Record |
|---|---|---|---|---|---|
| 1 | 1 | Nebraska | Big Ten | Automatic | 28–1 |
| 2 | 7 | Kentucky | SEC | Automatic | 19–7 |
| 3 | 10 | Arkansas | SEC | At–Large | 25–5 |
| 4 | 19 | Florida | SEC | At–Large | 18–9 |
| 5 | 20 | Georgia Tech | ACC | At–Large | 22–6 |
| 6 | 26 | Florida State | ACC | Automatic | 23–8 |
| 7 | 22 | James Madison | Sun Belt | At–Large | 21–9 |
| 8 | 34 | Missouri | SEC | At-Large | 17–12 |
| | 31 | Baylor | Big 12 | At-Large | 16–12 |
| | 58 | Delaware | Coastal | Automatic | 24–4 |
| | 52 | FGCU | Atlantic Sun | Automatic | 26–6 |
| | 280 | LIU | Northeast | Automatic | 13–18 |
| | 32 | South Alabama | Sun Belt | At-Large | 22–8 |
| | 36 | Stephen F. Austin | WAC | At-Large | 29–4 |
| | 43 | TCU | Big 12 | At-Large | 16–14 |
| | 102 | Wofford | Southern | Automatic | 23–7 |

Madison Regional
| Seed | RPI | School | Conference | Berth type | Record |
|---|---|---|---|---|---|
| 1 | 5 | Wisconsin | Big Ten | At-Large | 26–3 |
| 2 | 8 | Oregon | Pac-12 | At-Large | 26–5 |
| 3 | 12 | Purdue | Big Ten | At-Large | 21–8 |
| 4 | 14 | Kansas | Big 12 | At-Large | 23–5 |
| 5 | 21 | Penn State | Big Ten | At-Large | 21–8 |
| 6 | 27 | Marquette | Big East | At-Large | 20–10 |
| 7 | 25 | Iowa State | Big 12 | At-Large | 20–9 |
| 8 | 29 | Northern Iowa | Missouri Valley | Automatic | 26–6 |
| | 65 | Eastern Illinois | Ohio Valley | Automatic | 28–4 |
| | 138 | Fairfield | MAAC | Automatic | 22–6 |
| | 49 | Hawaii | Big West | Automatic | 23–8 |
| | 251 | Jackson State | SWAC | Automatic | 17–12 |
| | 45 | Miami (FL) | ACC | At-Large | 17–11 |
| | 111 | Omaha | Summit | Automatic | 15–13 |
| | 84 | SE Louisiana | Southland | Automatic | 28–4 |
| | 51 | Yale | Ivy | Automatic | 21–3 |

Pittsburgh Regional
| Seed | RPI | School | Conference | Berth type | Record |
|---|---|---|---|---|---|
| 1 | 4 | Pittsburgh | ACC | At-Large | 25–4 |
| 2 | 3 | Louisville | ACC | At-Large | 24–4 |
| 3 | 9 | Creighton | Big East | Automatic | 27–4 |
| 4 | 13 | Washington State | Pac-12 | At-Large | 24–7 |
| 5 | 18 | Dayton | Atlantic 10 | Automatic | 31–2 |
| 6 | 17 | Utah State | Mountain West | At–Large | 24–6 |
| 7 | 34 | Auburn | SEC | At–Large | 20–9 |
| 8 | 33 | USC | Pac-12 | At-Large | 18–12 |
| | 67 | Colgate | Patriot | Automatic | 22–7 |
| | 131 | Coppin State | MEAC | Automatic | 27–4 |
| | 76 | Grand Canyon | WAC | Automatic | 23–7 |
| | 40 | Minnesota | Big Ten | At–Large | 16–12 |
| | 41 | Pepperdine | West Coast | Automatic | 19–8 |
| | 48 | UMBC | America East | Automatic | 17–7 |
| | 35 | Western Michigan | MAC | Automatic | 30–2 |
| | 79 | Wright State | Horizon | Automatic | 21–10 |

Palo Alto Regional
| Seed | RPI | School | Conference | Berth type | Record |
|---|---|---|---|---|---|
| 1 | 2 | Stanford | Pac-12 | Automatic | 26–3 |
| 2 | 6 | Texas | Big 12 | Automatic | 22–4 |
| 3 | 11 | Tennessee | SEC | At-Large | 24–4 |
| 4 | 15 | BYU | Big 12 | At-Large | 24–6 |
| 5 | 23 | Arizona State | Pac-12 | At-Large | 26–6 |
| 6 | 16 | Western Kentucky | C-USA | Automatic | 29–4 |
| 7 | 24 | SMU | American | Automatic | 25–6 |
| 8 | 28 | Houston | Big 12 | At-Large | 18–9 |
| | 42 | Coastal Carolina | Sun Belt | Automatic | 22–9 |
| | 137 | Fresno State | Mountain West | Automatic | 19–13 |
| | 47 | Georgia | SEC | At-Large | 19–11 |
| | 56 | High Point | Big South | Automatic | 23–7 |
| | 37 | Texas A&M | SEC | At-Large | 16–12 |
| | 39 | Texas State | Sun Belt | At-Large | 20–9 |
| | 38 | UC Santa Barbara | Big West | At-Large | 27–4 |
| | 106 | Weber State | Big Sky | Automatic | 21–9 |

== Bracket ==
=== Lincoln Regional ===
First Round; November 30 & December 1
1 | Nebraska | 3
LIU | 0
Lincoln, NE
Delaware | 0
8 | Missouri | 3
5 | Georgia Tech | 3
South Alabama | 1
Gainesville, FL
FGCU | 0
4 | Florida | 3
3 | Arkansas | 3
Stephen F. Austin | 0
Fayetteville, AR
TCU | 3
6 | Florida State | 1
7 | James Madison | 0
Baylor | 3
Lexington, KY
Wofford | 0
2 | Kentucky | 3

Second Round; December 1 & 2
1 | Nebraska | 3
8 | Missouri | 0
5 | Georgia Tech | 3
4 | Florida | 2
3 | Arkansas | 3
TCU | 1
Baylor | 0
2 | Kentucky | 3

Regional Semifinals; December 7
1 | Nebraska | 3
5 | Georgia Tech | 0
3 | Arkansas | 3
2 | Kentucky | 2

Regional Finals; December 9
1 | Nebraska | 3
3 | Arkansas | 1

==== Schedule ====
===== First Round =====
| December 1, 2023; 7:00 PM CST | (1) Nebraska | 3–0 | LIU | Devaney Center; Attendance: 8,599 |
| December 1, 2023; 7:00 PM CST | (25–13, 25–16, 25–22) | | | Devaney Center; Attendance: 8,599 |

| December 1, 2023; 4:30 PM CST | Delaware | 0–3 | (8) Missouri | Devaney Center |
| December 1, 2023; 4:30 PM CST | (17–25, 22–25, 23–25) | | | Devaney Center |

| November 30, 2023; 3:30 PM CST | (5) Georgia Tech | 3–1 | South Alabama | O'Connell Center |
| November 30, 2023; 3:30 PM CST | (25–19, 22–25, 25–15, 25–12); Report | | | O'Connell Center |

| November 30, 2023 | FGCU | 0–3 | (4) Florida | O'Connell Center; Attendance: 2,102 |
| November 30, 2023 | (18–25, 16–25, 17–25) | | | O'Connell Center; Attendance: 2,102 |

| December 1, 2023; 7:00 PM CST | (3) Arkansas | 3–0 | Stephen F. Austin | Barnhill Arena; Attendance: 3,847 |
| December 1, 2023; 7:00 PM CST | (25–8, 25–17, 25–23) | | | Barnhill Arena; Attendance: 3,847 |

| December 1, 2023; 4:30 PM CST | TCU | 3–1 | (6) Florida State | Barnhill Arena |
| December 1, 2023; 4:30 PM CST | (26–24, 16–25, 25–18, 26–24) | | | Barnhill Arena |

| November 30, 2023; 3:30 PM CST | (7) James Madison | 0–3 | Baylor | Rupp Arena; Referees: Stephen Shepherd, Duane Holden, Bev Rea, Jeff Kline |
| November 30, 2023; 3:30 PM CST | (15–25, 19–25, 19–25); Report | | | Rupp Arena; Referees: Stephen Shepherd, Duane Holden, Bev Rea, Jeff Kline |

| November 30, 2023; 6:30 PM CST | Wofford | 0–3 | (2) Kentucky | Rupp Arena; Attendance: 2,180 |
| November 30, 2023; 6:30 PM CST | (17–25, 15–25, 16–25) | | | Rupp Arena; Attendance: 2,180 |

===== Second Round =====
| December 2, 2023; 7:00 PM CST | (1) Nebraska | 3–0 | (8) Missouri | Devaney Center; Attendance: 8,640 |
| December 2, 2023; 7:00 PM CST | (25–14, 25–19, 25–21) | | | Devaney Center; Attendance: 8,640 |

| December 1, 2023; 6:00 PM CST | (5) Georgia Tech | 3–2 | (4) Florida | O'Connell Center; Attendance: 2,104 |
| December 1, 2023; 6:00 PM CST | (22–25, 30–28, 25–21, 18–25, 16–14) | | | O'Connell Center; Attendance: 2,104 |

| December 2, 2023; 7:00 PM CST | (3) Arkansas | 3–1 | TCU | Barnhill Arena; Attendance: 3,557 |
| December 2, 2023; 7:00 PM CST | (25–18, 27–25, 23–25, 25–20) | | | Barnhill Arena; Attendance: 3,557 |

| December 1, 2023; 6:00 PM CST | Baylor | 0–3 | (2) Kentucky | Rupp Arena; Attendance: 2,573 |
| December 1, 2023; 6:00 PM CST | (18–25, 22–25, 17–25) | | | Rupp Arena; Attendance: 2,573 |

===== Regional Semifinals =====
| December 7, 2023; 1:00 PM CST | (1) Nebraska | 3–0 | (5) Georgia Tech | Devaney Center; Attendance: 8,580; Referees: Michelle Prater, Joseph Gustafson, Talita Benevides, Dan Swensen |
| December 7, 2023; 1:00 PM CST | (25–11, 25–16, 25–21); Report | | | Devaney Center; Attendance: 8,580; Referees: Michelle Prater, Joseph Gustafson, Talita Benevides, Dan Swensen |

| December 7, 2023; 3:30 PM CST | (3) Arkansas | 3–2 | (2) Kentucky | Devaney Center; Referees: Kevin Wendleboe, Paula Martin, Nathan Wagner, Amber Nicholson |
| December 7, 2023; 3:30 PM CST | (22–25, 25–22, 25–15, 22–25, 15–10); Report | | | Devaney Center; Referees: Kevin Wendleboe, Paula Martin, Nathan Wagner, Amber Nicholson |

===== Regional Final =====
| December 9, 2023; 5:00 PM CST | (1) Nebraska | 3–1 | (3) Arkansas | Devaney Center; Attendance: 8,713; Referees: Michelle Prater, Joseph Gustfson, Dan Swensen, Talita Benevides |
| December 9, 2023; 5:00 PM CST | (26–24, 25–14, 21–25, 25–23); Report | | | Devaney Center; Attendance: 8,713; Referees: Michelle Prater, Joseph Gustfson, Dan Swensen, Talita Benevides |

==== Region All-Tournament Yeam ====
The following players were named to the Lincoln Regional All-Tournament Team:

- Merritt Beason (Nebraska) – Most Outstanding Player
- Bergen Reilly (Nebraska)
- Lexi Rodriguez (Nebraska)
- Jillian Gillen (Arkansas)
- Maggie Cartwright (Arkansas)
- Azhani Tealer (Kentucky)
- Bianca Bertolino (Georgia Tech)

=== Pittsburgh Regional ===
First Round; November 30 & December 1
2 | Louisville | 3
Wright State | 1
Louisville, KY
Western Michigan | 3
7 | Auburn | 0
6 | Utah State | 0
Minnesota | 3
Omaha, NE
Colgate | 0
3 | Creighton | 3
4 | Washington State | 3
Grand Canyon | 0
Pullman, WA
Pepperdine | 2
5 | Dayton | 3
8 | Southern California | 3
UMBC | 0
Pittsburgh, PA
Coppin State | 0
1 | Pittsburgh | 3

Second Round; December 1 & 2
2 | Louisville | 3
Western Michigan | 0
Minnesota | 0
3 | Creighton | 3
4 | Washington State | 3
5 | Dayton | 1
8 | Southern California | 1
1 | Pittsburgh | 3

Regional Semifinals; December 7
2 | Louisville | 3
3 | Creighton | 2
4 | Washington State | 0
1 | Pittsburgh | 3

Regional Finals; December 9
2 | Louisville | 2
1 | Pittsburgh | 3

==== Schedule ====
===== First Round =====
| November 30, 2023; 6:00 PM CST | (2) Louisville | 3–1 | Wright State | KFC Yum! Center; Attendance: 5,035 |
| November 30, 2023; 6:00 PM CST | (22–25, 25–18, 25–20, 25–20) | | | KFC Yum! Center; Attendance: 5,035 |

| November 30, 2023; 3:00 PM CST | Western Michigan | 3–0 | (7) Auburn | KFC YUM! Center; Attendance: 1,045; Referees: Jeff McKinney, Jung Park |
| November 30, 2023; 3:00 PM CST | (25–18, 25–17, 25–19) | | | KFC YUM! Center; Attendance: 1,045; Referees: Jeff McKinney, Jung Park |

| December 1, 2023; 4:00 PM CST | (6) Utah State | 0–3 | Minnesota | D. J. Sokol Arena |
| December 1, 2023; 4:00 PM CST | (17–25, 14–25, 23–25) | | | D. J. Sokol Arena |

| December 1, 2023; 6:30 PM CST | Colgate | 0–3 | (3) Creighton | D. J. Sokol Arena; Attendance: 2,563 |
| December 1, 2023; 6:30 PM CST | (19–25, 23–25, 20–25) | | | D. J. Sokol Arena; Attendance: 2,563 |

| December 1, 2023; 9:00 PM CST | (4) Washington State | 3–0 | Grand Canyon | Bohler Gym; Attendance: 2,976 |
| December 1, 2023; 9:00 PM CST | (25–12, 31–29, 25–17) | | | Bohler Gym; Attendance: 2,976 |

| December 1, 2023; 6:00 PM CST | Pepperdine | 2–3 | (5) Dayton | Bohler Gym; Attendance: 1,561 |
| December 1, 2023; 6:00 PM CST | (26–28, 26–24, 20–25, 25–14, 15–11) | | | Bohler Gym; Attendance: 1,561 |

| December 1, 2023; 3:00 PM CST | (8) Southern California | 3–0 | UMBC | Petersen Events Center; Attendance: 262 |
| December 1, 2023; 3:00 PM CST | (25–18, 25–10, 25–12) | | | Petersen Events Center; Attendance: 262 |

| December 1, 2023; 6:00 PM CST | Coppin State | 0–3 | (1) Pittsburgh | Petersen Events Center; Attendance: 4,936 |
| December 1, 2023; 6:00 PM CST | (18–25, 14–25, 9–25) | | | Petersen Events Center; Attendance: 4,936 |

===== Second Round =====
| December 1, 2023; 6:00 PM CST | (2) Louisville | 3–0 | Western Michigan | KFC YUM! Center; Attendance: 5,529 |
| December 1, 2023; 6:00 PM CST | (26–24, 25–18, 25–22) | | | KFC YUM! Center; Attendance: 5,529 |

| December 2, 2023; 6:30 PM CST | Minnesota | 0–3 | (3) Creighton | Sokol Arena; Attendance: 2,568 |
| December 2, 2023; 6:30 PM CST | (21–25, 20–25, 27–29) | | | Sokol Arena; Attendance: 2,568 |

| December 2, 2023; 9:00 PM CST | (4) Washington State | 3–1 | (5) Dayton | Bohler Gym; Attendance: 2,463 |
| December 2, 2023; 9:00 PM CST | (25–21, 25–15, 20–25, 25–16) | | | Bohler Gym; Attendance: 2,463 |

| December 2, 2023; 6:00 PM CST | (8) Southern California | 1–3 | (1) Pittsburgh | Petersen Events Center; Attendance: 4,936 |
| December 2, 2023; 6:00 PM CST | (23–25, 25–20, 25–18, 25–18) | | | Petersen Events Center; Attendance: 4,936 |

===== Regional Semifinals =====
| December 7, 2023; 11:00 AM CST | (2) Louisville | 3–2 | (3) Creighton | Fitzgerald Field House; Attendance: 2,879 |
| December 7, 2023; 11:00 AM CST | (25–21, 14–25, 25–23, 24–26, 15–8) | | | Fitzgerald Field House; Attendance: 2,879 |

| December 7, 2023; 1:30 PM CST | (4) Washington State | 0–3 | (1) Pittsburgh | Fitzgerald Field House; Attendance: 2,879 |
| December 7, 2023; 1:30 PM CST | (20–25, 13–25, 16–25) | | | Fitzgerald Field House; Attendance: 2,879 |

===== Regional Final =====
| December 9, 2023; 3:00 PM CST | (2) Louisville | 2–3 | (1) Pittsburgh | Fitzgerald Field House; Attendance: 2,879 |
| December 9, 2023; 3:00 PM CST | (25–23, 25–20, 16–25, 19–25, 7–15) | | | Fitzgerald Field House; Attendance: 2,879 |

==== Region All-Tournament Team ====
The following players were named to the Pittsburgh Regional All-Tournament Team:

- Olivia Babcock (Pittsburgh) – Most Outstanding Player
- Torrey Stafford (Pittsburgh)
- Rachel Fairbanks (Pittsburgh)
- Emma Monks (Pittsburgh)
- Cara Cresse (Louisville)
- Phekran Kong (Louisville)
- Elena Scott (Louisville)
- Kendra Wait (Creighton)

=== Madison Regional ===
First Round; November 30 & December 1
1 | Wisconsin | 3
Jackson State | 0
Madison, WI
Miami (FL) | 3
8 | Northern Iowa | 1
5 | Penn State | 3
Yale | 1
Lawrence, KS
Omaha | 0
4 | Kansas | 3
3 | Purdue | 3
Fairfield | 0
West Lafayette, IN
Eastern Illinois | 0
6 | Marquette | 3
7 | Iowa State | 1
Hawaiʻi | 3
Eugene, OR
Southeastern Louisiana | 0
2 | Oregon | 3

Second Round; December 1 & 2
1 | Wisconsin | 3
Miami (FL) | 0
5 | Penn State | 3
4 | Kansas | 2
3 | Purdue | 3
6 | Marquette | 1
Hawaiʻi | 0
2 | Oregon | 3

Regional Semifinals; December 7
1 | Wisconsin | 3
5 | Penn State | 1
3 | Purdue | 0
2 | Oregon | 3

Regional Finals; December 9
1 | Wisconsin | 3
2 | Oregon | 1

==== Schedule ====
===== First Round =====
| November 30, 2023; 7:30 PM CST | (1) Wisconsin | 3–0 | Jackson State | UW Field House; Attendance: 7,229 |
| November 30, 2023; 7:30 PM CST | (25–18, 25–9, 25–18) | | | UW Field House; Attendance: 7,229 |

| November 30, 2023; 5:00 PM CST | Miami (FL) | 3–1 | (8) Northern Iowa | UW Field House |
| November 30, 2023; 5:00 PM CST | (25–23, 25–19, 20–25, 25–20); Report | | | UW Field House |

| November 30, 2023; 4:30 PM CST | (5) Penn State | 3–1 | Yale | Horejsi Family Volleyball Arena; Referees: Mary Faragher, Ian Young, Anthony Oligney-Estill, Nathan Hudson |
| November 30, 2023; 4:30 PM CST | (25–17, 23–25, 25–22, 25–16); Report | | | Horejsi Family Volleyball Arena; Referees: Mary Faragher, Ian Young, Anthony Oligney-Estill, Nathan Hudson |

| November 30, 2023; 7:00 PM CST | Omaha | 0–3 | (4) Kansas | Horejsi Family Volleyball Arena; Attendance: 1,662 |
| November 30, 2023; 7:00 PM CST | (16–25, 19–25, 26–28) | | | Horejsi Family Volleyball Arena; Attendance: 1,662 |

| November 30, 2023; 6:00 PM CST | (3) Purdue | 3–0 | Fairfield | Holloway Gymnasium; Attendance: 2,415; Referees: Rod Rodriguez, Joe Gustafson, Tracy Levine, Barb Zvonek |
| November 30, 2023; 6:00 PM CST | (25–17, 25–13, 25–12); Report | | | Holloway Gymnasium; Attendance: 2,415; Referees: Rod Rodriguez, Joe Gustafson, Tracy Levine, Barb Zvonek |

| November 30, 2023; 3:30 PM CST | Eastern Illinois | 0–3 | (6) Marquette | Holloway Gymnasium; Attendance: 2,415 |
| November 30, 2023; 3:30 PM CST | (19–25, 16–25, 14–25); Report | | | Holloway Gymnasium; Attendance: 2,415 |

| November 30, 2023; 6:00 PM CST | (7) Iowa State | 1–3 | Hawaiʻi | Matthew Knight Arena |
| November 30, 2023; 6:00 PM CST | (25–16, 24–26, 18–25, 23–25) | | | Matthew Knight Arena |

| November 30, 2023; 9:00 PM CST | Southeastern Louisiana | 0–3 | (2) Oregon | Matthew Knight Arena; Attendance: 3,022 |
| November 30, 2023; 9:00 PM CST | (16–25, 13–25, 13–25) | | | Matthew Knight Arena; Attendance: 3,022 |

===== Second Round =====
| December 1, 2023; 7:00 PM CST | (1) Wisconsin | 3–0 | Miami (FL) | UW Field House; Attendance: 7,229 |
| December 1, 2023; 7:00 PM CST | (25–23, 25–15, 25–17) | | | UW Field House; Attendance: 7,229 |

| December 1, 2023; 5:30 PM CST | (5) Penn State | 3–2 | (4) Kansas | Horejsi Family Volleyball Arena |
| December 1, 2023; 5:30 PM CST | (25–20, 22–25, 25–21, 13–25, 15–13) | | | Horejsi Family Volleyball Arena |

| December 1, 2023; 6:00 PM CST | (3) Purdue | 3–1 | (6) Marquette | Holloway Gymnasium; Attendance: 2,415 |
| December 1, 2023; 6:00 PM CST | (25–21, 25–23, 24–26, 26–24) | | | Holloway Gymnasium; Attendance: 2,415 |

| December 1, 2023; 9:00 PM CST | Hawaiʻi | 0–3 | (2) Oregon | Matthew Knight Arena; Attendance: 2,342 |
| December 1, 2023; 9:00 PM CST | (23–25, 12–25, 17–25) | | | Matthew Knight Arena; Attendance: 2,342 |

===== Regional Semifinals =====
| December 7, 2023; 6:00 PM CST | (1) Wisconsin | 3–1 | (5) Penn State | UW Field House; Attendance: 7,229 |
| December 7, 2023; 6:00 PM CST | (25–11, 28–30, 25–12, 25–18); Report | | | UW Field House; Attendance: 7,229 |

| December 7, 2023; 8:30 PM CST | (3) Purdue | 0–3 | (2) Oregon | UW Field House; Attendance: 7,229 |
| December 7, 2023; 8:30 PM CST | (14–25, 19–25, 27–29); Report | | | UW Field House; Attendance: 7,229 |

===== Regional Final =====
| December 9, 2023; 7:00 PM CST | (1) Wisconsin | 3–1 | (2) Oregon | UW Field House; Attendance: 7,229; Referees: Devonie McLarty, Daphne Nelson, Henry Chen, Sarah Myres |
| December 9, 2023; 7:00 PM CST | (25–22, 25–22, 25–27, 25–18); Report | | | UW Field House; Attendance: 7,229; Referees: Devonie McLarty, Daphne Nelson, Henry Chen, Sarah Myres |

==== Region All-Tournament Team ====
The following players were named to the Madison Regional All-Tournament Team:

- Sarah Franklin (Wisconsin) – Most Outstanding Player
- Carter Booth (Wisconsin)
- Julia Orzol (Wisconsin)
- Devyn Robinson (Wisconsin)
- Hannah Pukis (Oregon)
- Morgan Lewis (Oregon)

=== Palo Alto Regional ===
First Round; November 30 & December 1
2 | Texas | 3
Texas A&M | 1
Austin, TX
Texas State | 0
7 | SMU | 3
6 | Western Kentucky | 3
Coastal Carolina | 0
Knoxville, TN
High Point | 0
3 | Tennessee | 3
4 | BYU | 3
Weber State | 0
Provo, UT
Georgia | 0
5 | Arizona State | 3
8 | Houston | 3
UC Santa Barbara | 1
Palo Alto, CA
Fresno State | 0
1 | Stanford | 3

Second Round; December 1 & 2
2 | Texas | 3
7 | SMU | 0
6 | Western Kentucky | 0
3 | Tennessee | 3
4 | BYU | 0
5 | Arizona State | 3
8 | Houston | 2
1 | Stanford | 3

Regional Semifinals; December 7
2 | Texas | 3
3 | Tennessee | 2
5 | Arizona State | 1
1 | Stanford | 3

Regional Finals; December 9
2 | Texas | 3
1 | Stanford | 1

==== Schedule ====
===== First Round =====
| November 30, 2023; 6:00 PM CST | (2) Texas | 3–1 | Texas A&M | Gregory Gymnasium; Attendance: 4,122 |
| November 30, 2023; 6:00 PM CST | (21–25, 25–13, 25–20, 25–20) | | | Gregory Gymnasium; Attendance: 4,122 |

| November 30, 2023 | Texas State | 0–3 | (7) SMU | Gregory Gymnasium |
| November 30, 2023 | (20–25, 19–25, 16–25) | | | Gregory Gymnasium |

| December 1, 2023 | (6) Western Kentucky | 3–0 | Coastal Carolina | Thompson-Boling Arena; Attendance: 1,172 |
| December 1, 2023 | (25–14, 25–20, 25–23) | | | Thompson-Boling Arena; Attendance: 1,172 |

| December 1, 2023 | High Point | 0–3 | (3) Tennessee | Thompson-Boling Arena; Attendance: 2,304 |
| December 1, 2023 | (20–25, 19–25, 15–25) | | | Thompson-Boling Arena; Attendance: 2,304 |

| December 1, 2023 | (4) BYU | 3–0 | Weber State | Smith Fieldhouse; Attendance: 3,504 |
| December 1, 2023 | (25–16, 25–16, 27–25) | | | Smith Fieldhouse; Attendance: 3,504 |

| December 1, 2023 | Georgia | 0–3 | (5) Arizona State | Smith Fieldhouse; Attendance: 503 |
| December 1, 2023 | (21–25, 12–25, 20–25) | | | Smith Fieldhouse; Attendance: 503 |

| December 1, 2023 | (8) Houston | 3–1 | UC Santa Barbara | Maples Pavilion; Attendance: 1,017 |
| December 1, 2023 | (21–25, 25–23, 25–16, 25–18) | | | Maples Pavilion; Attendance: 1,017 |

| December 1, 2023 | Fresno State | 0–3 | (1) Stanford | Maples Pavilion; Attendance: 2,729 |
| December 1, 2023 | (21–25, 12–25, 15–25) | | | Maples Pavilion; Attendance: 2,729 |

===== Second Round =====
| December 1, 2023; 7:00 PM CST | (2) Texas | 3–0 | (7) SMU | Gregory Gymnasium; Attendance: 3,978 |
| December 1, 2023; 7:00 PM CST | (25–16, 25–14, 25–17) | | | Gregory Gymnasium; Attendance: 3,978 |

| December 2, 2023; 5:00 PM CST | (6) Western Kentucky | 0–3 | (3) Tennessee | Thompson-Boling Arena; Attendance: 1,958 |
| December 2, 2023; 5:00 PM CST | (20–25, 16–25, 24–26) | | | Thompson-Boling Arena; Attendance: 1,958 |

| December 2, 2023; 8:00 PM CST | (4) BYU | 0–3 | (5) Arizona State | Smith Fieldhouse; Attendance: 3,427 |
| December 2, 2023; 8:00 PM CST | (20–25, 21–25, 21–25) | | | Smith Fieldhouse; Attendance: 3,427 |

| December 2, 2023; 8:00 PM CST | (8) Houston | 2–3 | (1) Stanford | Maples Pavilion; Attendance: 2,885 |
| December 2, 2023; 8:00 PM CST | (15–25, 20–25, 25–22, 25–22, 7–15) | | | Maples Pavilion; Attendance: 2,885 |

===== Regional Semifinals =====
| December 7, 2023; 8:00 PM CST | (2) Texas | 3–2 | (3) Tennessee | Maples Pavilion; Attendance: 2,483 |
| December 7, 2023; 8:00 PM CST | (25–19, 20–25, 23–25, 26–24, 16–14); Report | | | Maples Pavilion; Attendance: 2,483 |

| December 7, 2023; 10:30 PM CST | (5) Arizona State | 1–3 | (1) Stanford | Maples Pavilion; Attendance: 3,025 |
| December 7, 2023; 10:30 PM CST | (22–25, 25–21, 25–20, 25–21); Report | | | Maples Pavilion; Attendance: 3,025 |

===== Regional Final =====
| December 9, 2023; 9:00 PM CST | (2) Texas | 3–1 | (1) Stanford | Maples Pavilion; Attendance: 4,312; Referees: Pati Rolf, Nikki Kathol, Neal Meredith, Devin Darrough |
| December 9, 2023; 9:00 PM CST | (25–16, 15–25, 25–19, 25–22); Report | | | Maples Pavilion; Attendance: 4,312; Referees: Pati Rolf, Nikki Kathol, Neal Meredith, Devin Darrough |

==== Region All-Tournament Team ====
The following players were named to the Stanford Regional All-Tournament Team:

- Madisen Skinner (Texas) – Most Outstanding Player
- Ella Swindle (Texas)
- Asjia O'Neal (Texas)
- Kendall Kipp (Stanford)
- Elia Rubin (Stanford)
- Morgahn Fingall (Tennessee)
- Mary Shroll (Arizona State)

== Final Four ==
National Semifinals; Amalie Arena; December 14
1 | Nebraska | 3
1 | Pittsburgh | 0
1 | Wisconsin | 1
2 | Texas | 3

National Championship; Amalie Arena; December 17
1 | Nebraska | 0
2 | Texas | 3

=== National semifinals ===
| December 14, 2023; 6:00 PM CST | (1) Nebraska | 3–0 | (1) Pittsburgh | Amalie Arena, Tampa, Florida; Attendance: 19,598; Referees: Devonie McLarty, Daphne Nelson, Sarah Myres, Neal Meredith |
| December 14, 2023; 6:00 PM CST | (25–20, 25–23, 25–17); Report | | | Amalie Arena, Tampa, Florida; Attendance: 19,598; Referees: Devonie McLarty, Daphne Nelson, Sarah Myres, Neal Meredith |

| December 14, 2023; 8:30 PM CST | (1) Wisconsin | 1–3 | (2) Texas | Amalie Arena, Tampa, Florida; Attendance: 19,598; Referees: Michelle Prater, Robyn Courchane, Dan Swensen, Bev Rea |
| December 14, 2023; 8:30 PM CST | (22–25, 25–20, 13–25, 16–25); Report | | | Amalie Arena, Tampa, Florida; Attendance: 19,598; Referees: Michelle Prater, Robyn Courchane, Dan Swensen, Bev Rea |

=== National championship ===
| December 17, 2023; 3:00 p.m. EST | (1) Nebraska | 0–3 | (2) Texas | Amalie Arena, Tampa, Florida; Attendance: 19,727 |
| December 17, 2023; 3:00 p.m. EST | (22–25, 14–25, 11–25); Report | | | Amalie Arena, Tampa, Florida; Attendance: 19,727 |

=== Final Four All-Tournament Team ===
The following players were named to the final four all-tournament team:

- Madisen Skinner (Texas) – Most Outstanding Player
- Asjia O'Neal (Texas)
- Emma Halter (Texas)
- Ella Swindle (Texas)
- Merritt Beason (Nebraska)
- Bekka Allick (Nebraska)
- Anna Smrek (Wisconsin)

== Records by Conference ==
Overview of conference performance in the 2023 NCAA Division I women's volleyball tournament
| Conference | Bids | Record | Win % | R32 | S16 | E8 | F4 | CG | NC |
|---|---|---|---|---|---|---|---|---|---|
| Big 12 | 7 | 11–6 | .647 | 6 | 1 | 1 | 1 | 1 | 1 |
| Big Ten | 5 | 14–5 | .778 | 5 | 4 | 2 | 2 | 1 | – |
| ACC | 5 | 10–5 | .667 | 4 | 3 | 2 | 1 | – | – |
| Pac-12 | 5 | 11–5 | .688 | 5 | 4 | 2 | – | – | – |
| SEC | 8 | 9–8 | .529 | 5 | 3 | 1 | – | – | – |
| Big East | 2 | 3–2 | .600 | 2 | 1 | – | – | – | – |
| American | 1 | 1–1 | .500 | 1 | – | – | – | – | – |
| Atlantic 10 | 1 | 1–1 | .500 | 1 | – | – | – | – | – |
| C-USA | 1 | 1–1 | .500 | 1 | – | – | – | – | – |
| MAC | 1 | 1–1 | .500 | 1 | – | – | – | – | – |
| Big West | 2 | 1–2 | .333 | 1 | – | – | – | – | – |
| Sun Belt | 4 | 0–4 | .000 | – | – | – | – | – | – |
| Mountain West | 2 | 0–2 | .000 | – | – | – | – | – | – |
| WAC | 2 | 0–2 | .000 | – | – | – | – | – | – |
| Others | 18 | 0–18 | .000 | – | – | – | – | – | – |

- The following conferences had a single team that failed to advance beyond the round of 64: America East, ASUN, Big Sky, Big South, CAA, Horizon, Ivy League, MAAC, MEAC, Missouri Valley, Northeast, Ohio Valley, Patriot, SoCon, Southland, SWAC, Summit, WCC. The conference's records have been consolidated in the other row.
