= Zoe Jarvis =

American volleyball player (born 2000)

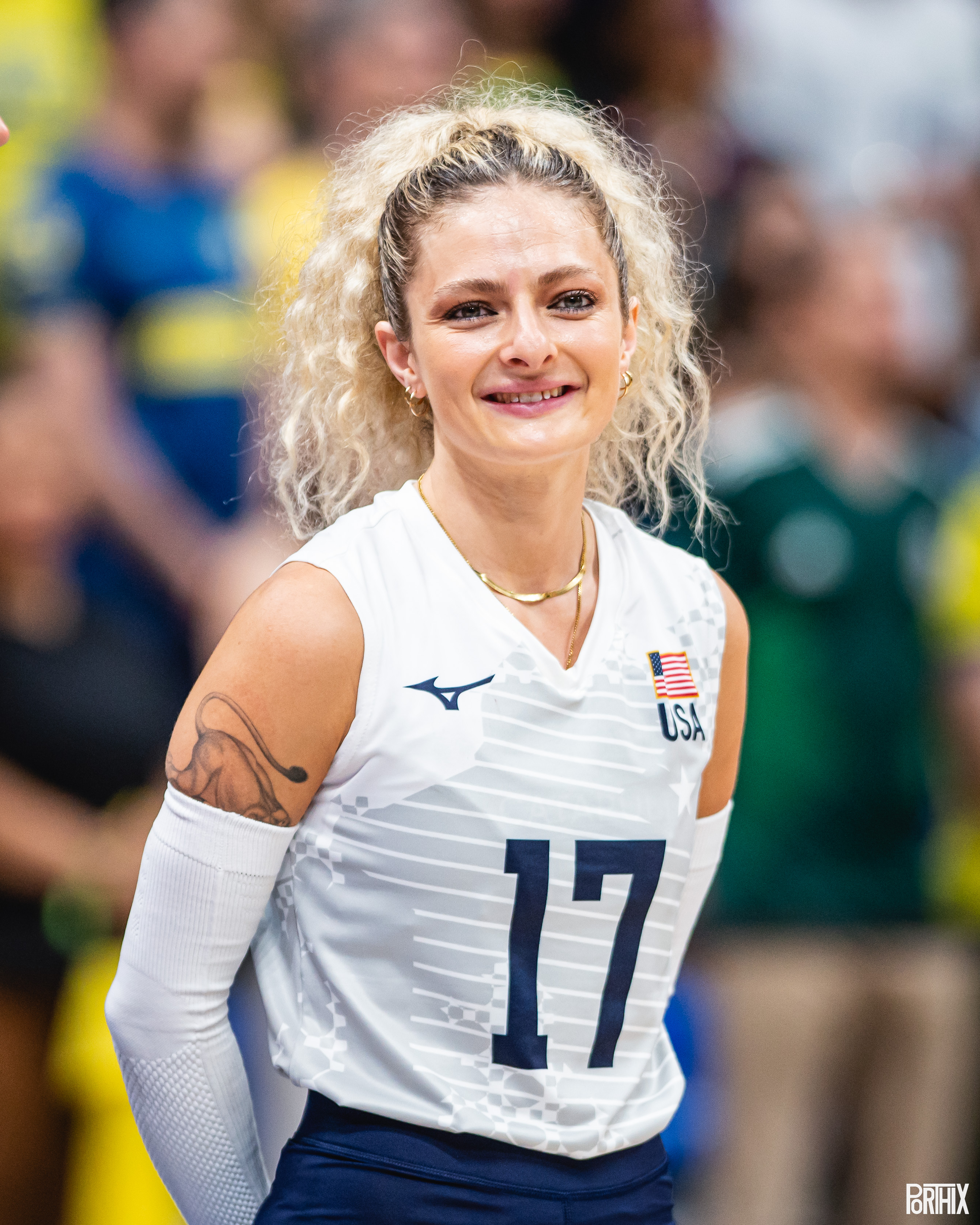
- Jarvis with the US Women's National Volleyball Team in 2025

Personal information
- Born: Zoe Jenellen Fleck; September 29, 2000 (age 26) Panorama City, California, U.S.
- Home town: Granada Hills, California, U.S.
- Education: UC Santa Barbara (2018–2019); UCLA (2020–2021); Texas (2022)
- Height: 5 ft 4 in (162cm)

Volleyball information
- Position: Libero
- Current club: Atlanta Vibe
- Number: 10

Career
- Years: Team
- 2023–2024: USC Münster
- 2025–2026: LOVB Austin
- 2027–: Atlanta Vibe

National team
- Years: Team
- 2023–: United States
Honours
Women's volleyball
Representing the United States
NORCECA Pan American Cup
Silver medal – second place	2024 León	Team
Bronze medal – third place	2023 Ponce	Team
NORCECA Pan American Cup Final Six
Gold medal – first place	2023 Santo Domingo	Team
- Updated on August 2, 2026

Zoe Jarvis (born Zoe Jenellen Fleck; September 29, 2000) is an American professional volleyball libero who plays as a libero for Atlanta Vibe and the United States national team. She began her college career in 2018 as a walk-on at UC Santa Barbara, then became a 3x All American with UCLA and Texas, won the 2022 national championship with Texas Longhorns, two LOVB Pro championships with LOVB Austin (2025, 2026), and has represented the United States in the Volleyball Nations League (VNL) and NORCECA international competition.

== Early Life and High School Career ==
Jarvis was born in the neighborhood of Panorama City, Los Angeles, to Eve and David Fleck. Her father was an All-American diver for UCLA. She grew up in the neighborhood of Granada Hills with two younger brothers. She started playing volleyball at age nine.

Jarvis played high school volleyball for the Sierra Canyon prep school, winning the Gold Coast League championship in all four years, and up until 2024 held the school record for career digs with 1,474. She also ran cross country and track her first two years. Named the league's most valuable player as a junior, she led Sierra Canyon to win its first CIF Southern Section title in 2016. She played youth club volleyball with Supernova All-Stars in Granada Hills, CA.

Jarvis verbally committed to the University of California, Santa Barbara, in February 2017. On senior night in October 2017, she played outside hitter for a set and recorded five kills. She finished her high school career by defending Sierra Canyon's CIF title and winning the school's first state volleyball title at the 2017 CIF State Division II Championship.

== College Career ==
Jarvis began playing for the UC Santa Barbara Gauchos in 2018, averaging 2.04 digs per set in her freshman year and 3.97 as a sophomore. UCSB reached the second round of the NCAA tournament in 2019, falling to Jarvis's future team Texas in five sets.

Jarvis entered the transfer portal in 2020, returning to her hometown when she picked the University of California, Los Angeles, for her junior season. She averaged 4.16 digs per set for the UCLA Bruins and was named the Pac-12 Conference Libero of the Year both of her seasons there. She received an American Volleyball Coaches Association (AVCA) All-American honorable mention as a junior and was selected to the All-American third team as a senior, the same year she helped UCLA reach the 2021 NCAA tournament's regional semifinals.

Jarvis played a fifth college season at the University of Texas at Austin, where she averaged 4.42 digs per set and holds the single season digs per set record. Her teammate Logan Eggleston and coach Jerritt Elliott praised her defensive abilities and team leadership, and she was ranked in 2022 as one of college volleyball's best liberos. Named the Big 12 Conference Libero of the Year, she helped Texas win the 2022 NCAA championship and was one of three Longhorns to be named first-team All-American, alongside Eggleston and Asjia O'Neal.

Jarvis began her collegiate career as a walk-on at UC Santa Barbara before transferring to UCLA and later Texas. Over five collegiate seasons, she progressed from a mid-major walk-on to a two-time Pac-12 Libero of the Year, Big 12 Libero of the Year, first-team All-American, and NCAA national champion. Following her college career, she began playing professionally and joined the senior United States National Team.

== Professional Career ==
In January 2023, Jarvis signed a 2-year deal with German club USC Münster where she immediately took over the starting libero job and went on to win MVP in 6 matches across 2 seasons.

Following her 2 pro seasons in Germany, Jarvis returned to the United States to join LOVB Austin for the inaugural 2025 season of LOVB Pro. Jarvis won "Best Digger" at the Inaugural Midseason Tournament, the LOVB Classic. She also helped the club win league championships in both 2025 and 2026. In May 2026, it was announced that Jarvis had signed with Atlanta Vibe for Major League Volleyball (MLV) 2027 season.

== International Career ==
Jarvis was selected to the United States U20 Women’s National Training Team in 2018. She later represented the United States Women’s Collegiate National Team in 2021 and 2022 before joining the Senior United States Women’s National Team in 2023.

In 2024, Jarvis was among the 20 athletes selected to the United States National Team Olympic Training Group for the Paris Olympic Games before the roster was narrowed to the final 12 of the Olympic squad.

With the Senior National Team, Jarvis won a gold medal at the 2023 NORCECA Pan American Cup Final Six, a bronze medal at the 2023 NORCECA Pan American Cup, and a silver medal at the 2024 NORCECA Pan American Cup. She also represented the United States in the 2024 and 2025 editions of the FIVB Volleyball Nations League (VNL).

== Honors and awards ==
COLLEGE

- NCAA Division I National Champion (2022 - Texas)
- AVCA First-Team All-American (2022 - Texas)
- Big 12 Libero of the Year (2022 - Texas)
- First-Team All-Big 12 (2022 - Texas)
- AVCA Third-Team All-American (2021 - UCLA)
- First-Team All-Pac-12 (2020, 2021 - UCLA)
- Pac-12 Libero of the Year (2020, 2021 - UCLA)
- AVCA Honorable Mention All-American (2020 - UCLA)

PROFESSIONAL

- 6x MVP with USC Münster (2023, 2024)
- LOVB Classic "Best Digger" (2025)
- LOVB Pro Champion (2025)
- LOVB Pro Champion (2026)

INTERNATIONAL

- NORCECA Pan American Cup Final Six – Gold (2023)
- NORCECA Pan American Cup – Bronze (2023)
- NORCECA Pan American Cup – Silver (2024)

== Coaching and Business Ventures ==
In 2021, Jarvis founded All Out Volleyball (AOVB), a volleyball coaching and athlete development company that provides in-person camps, travel clinics, online mentorship, and educational resources for volleyball athletes and coaches.

Alongside her husband and co-founder, Robbie Jarvis, she has led camps and clinics throughout the United States, teaching technical skill development, game analysis, and performance mindset to youth athletes. The company also operates an online mentorship program featuring film review, live coaching sessions, and individualized athlete feedback.

Jarvis has stated that All Out Volleyball was founded to share the techniques and learning methods she developed throughout her journey from collegiate walk-on to NCAA national champion and professional player.

== Personal life ==
Jarvis is married to actor Robbie Jarvis. The pair began dating in 2020, announced their engagement in March 2024, and married in May 2025. She has been vegan since 2018 and is an outspoken animal rights activist. She also founded a volleyball coaching business called All Out Volleyball in 2021.

Outside of volleyball, Jarvis is known for her interest in movement-based sports and cross-training. She regularly trains in gymnastics, trail running, slacklining, tennis, Muay Thai, and CrossFit. She is also known for sharing videos of training on the traveling rings at Original Muscle Beach in Santa Monica, California, through her social media platforms.
