= Asjia O'Neal =

American volleyball player (born 1999)

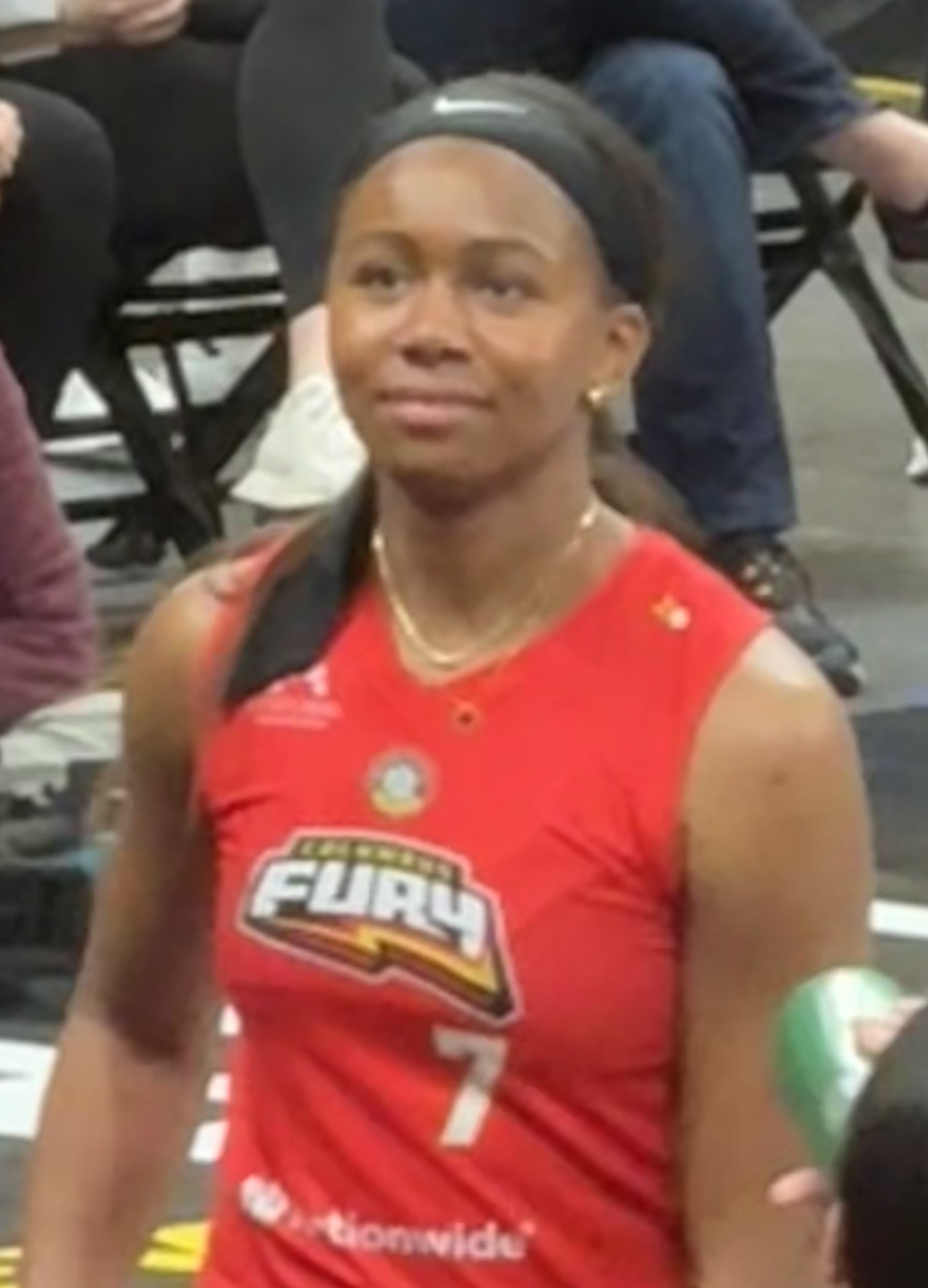
- O'Neal in 2024

Personal information
- Born: October 23, 1999 (age 27); Portland, Oregon, U.S.
- Height: 6 ft 3 in (191 cm)
- Education: Texas (2018–2023)

Volleyball information
- Position: Middle blocker
- Current club: LOVB Austin
- Number: 7

Career
Years	Teams
2024	Columbus Fury
2025–	LOVB Austin

National team
2023–	United States

Asjia O'Neal (born October 23, 1999) is an American professional volleyball player for LOVB Austin. She played college volleyball for the Texas Longhorns and won back-to-back NCAA championships in 2022 and 2023.

== Early life ==
O'Neal was born to National Basketball Association (NBA) player Jermaine O'Neal and his wife Mesha. She practiced basketball with her father after fourth grade and took up volleyball in seventh grade in 2012 after moving from Miami to Dallas. She played three years of varsity high school volleyball at Carroll Senior High School in Southlake, Texas. As a high school sophomore, she committed to the University of Texas at Austin.

O'Neal was born with a heart murmur and mitral valve leak, for which she underwent open-heart surgery at age 13 and again after her freshman season of college.

== College career ==
O'Neal redshirted her first year at Texas in 2018. She averaged a hitting percentage of .413 to start her first season, while having a worsening mitral valve leak and a new tricuspid valve leak that required a second open-heart surgery in January 2020. That summer, she helped organize campus activism to rename landmarks and build statues of former black students during the George Floyd protests. She helped Texas reach the final of the 2020 NCAA tournament held in the spring of 2021. She received the Honda Inspiration Award for the 2020 season.

O'Neal helped the Longhorns win the 2022 NCAA championship alongside fellow first-team All-Americans Logan Eggleston and Zoe Fleck. She averaged a career-high .443 hitting percentage that season. She returned for a sixth year and led Texas to defend its title at the 2023 NCAA championship.

== Professional career ==
O'Neal was drafted first overall in the first Pro Volleyball Federation (PVF) draft in December 2023. In January 2024, she signed with the Columbus Fury. In July 2024, it was announced O'Neal had signed with LOVB Austin for LOVB Pro's inaugural 2025 season.

== International career ==
O'Neal first played for the United States national team at the 2023 FIVB Volleyball Women's Nations League.
