= High Point Panthers women's volleyball =

American college volleyball team

- University: High Point University
- Head coach: Ryan Meek (9th season)
- Conference: Big South
- Location: High Point, North Carolina, US
- Home arena: Millis Athletic Convocation Center (capacity: 1,750)
- Nickname: Panthers
- Colors: Purple and white

AIAW/NCAA tournament appearance
- 2010, 2016, 2017, 2018, 2020, 2022, 2023

Conference tournament champion
- 2010, 2016, 2018, 2020, 2022, 2023

Conference regular season champion
- 2008, 2017, 2020, 2022, 2023

The High Point Panthers women's volleyball team is an NCAA Division I volleyball is the team that is representing High Point University as part of the Big South Conference. They play their home games at Millis Athletic Convocation Center in High Point, North Carolina.

== History ==
High Point University created a volleyball team in 1973, with the Panthers joining the present-day Conference Carolinas, where they played until the 1997 academic year. The Panthers competed only in the NAIA until 1992, had dual membership with the NAIA and Division II in 1993–1994, and moved up to exclusively Division II in 1995. The program had a spate of successful seasons from 1975 to 1980, winning six straight conference titles and peaking with 42 wins in back-to-back years in 1977–1978. However, the NAIA did not begin sponsoring women's volleyball championships until 1980, and the AIAW did not invite them to its volleyball championship. High Point made the NAIA tournament four times: 1982, 1983, 1986, and 1988. The NAIA volleyball championship has a round-robin format, and the Panthers went 2–12 in their four appearances in the 1980s. In Division II, the Panthers won back-to-back conference championships in the Carolinas-Virginia Athletics Conference in 1995–1996. However, this did not result in any NCAA tournament appearances, as the league was a fledgling member of Division II.

The High Point Panthers moved up to Division I and joined the Big South Conference in 1999, and the volleyball team encountered struggles in its first few seasons, losing 27+ games each year from 1999 to 2003. However, head coach Chad Esposito was able to build the program up to 24 wins in 2007 and 26 wins in 2008, winning the team's only shared regular-season championship to date in 2008. The Panthers fell 3–2 to Coastal Carolina in the Big South tournament semifinals that year.

The Panthers were coached by Jason Oliver from 2009 to 2015, and his tenure was highlighted by a conference tournament championship in 2010, where they swept top-seeded Liberty in the final. The Panthers drew No. 12 Duke in the first round, and lost 25–12, 25–20, 25–20.

Current head coach Tom Mendoza was hired in 2016, bringing a history of success with him. Mendoza had previously coached at Creighton, leading the Blue Jays to a 142–57 record in six seasons from 2010 to 2015, five NCAA Tournament bids, and a Sweet 16 appearance in 2015. In his first season at High Point, Mendoza guided the Panthers to a 23–10 record and the program's second Big South conference tournament title, a 3–1 triumph against top-seeded Radford. The Panthers faced No. 7 North Carolina in the NCAA tournament, falling 25–13, 25–12, 25–23. 2017 was the team's most successful in the Division I era in terms of RPI, as the team reached as high as 44 by the end of the season. After a 5–6 start to the season, including four losses to top-50 RPI teams, the Panthers won 19 straight matches, becoming the first team in Big South history to go 16–0 in conference, while only conceding 4 sets in conference play. The Panthers handed their rivals Radford two of the Highlanders' four losses in the regular season, but in the conference tournament championship, held at Radford, the Highlanders avenged the regular season losses and the previous championship in a 3–1 victory. However, the Panthers were surprisingly picked as an at-large bid for the NCAA Tournament due to their final RPI of 39. They traveled to Salt Lake City to take on Purdue. The Panthers won the first set 25-21 before dropping the next three to finish the season 24–8.

== Individual awards ==
Big South Rookie of the Year

- Tracyann Pryce - 1999
- Lindsey Pickens - 2003
- Savannah Angel - 2013
- Molly Livingston - 2015
- Abby Bottomley - 2017

Big South Coach of the Year

- Chad Esposito - 2008
- Tom Mendoza - 2017

Big South Tournament MVP

- Audie Gonzalez - 2010
- Haley Barnes - 2016

Big South Scholar-Athlete of the Year

- Molly Barlow - 2012
- Gabi Mirand - 2015
- Haley Barnes - 2017

== Individual career records (Division I era) ==
Record	Number	Player	Years
Kills	1597	Jamie Kaufman	2004-07
Attack %	.289	Stephanie Wallin	2007-10
Assists	3982	Kristina Taylor	2005-08
Aces	220	Jamie Kaufman	2004-07
Digs	2416	Julie Hershkowitz	2007-10
Total Blocks	340	Tracyann Pryce	1999-02
Sets Played	488	Julie Hershkowitz	2007-10

== Individual single-season records (Division I era) ==
Record	Number	Player	Years
Kills	523	Megan Smith	2010
Attack %	.384	Molly Livingston	2017
Assists	1439	Kristina Taylor	2007
Aces	67	Jamie Kaufman	2005
Digs	688	Julie Hershkowitz	2010
Total Blocks	143	Jordan Hefner	2016

== Seasons ==
Record table
Season	Coach	Overall	Conference	Standing	Postseason
AIAW Small College Division Independent (1973–1974)
1973	Jennifer Alley	3-10			
1974	Jennifer Alley	8-13			
AIAW Small College Division Carolinas-Virginia Athletics Conference (1975–1979)
1975	Jennifer Alley	25-12			
1976	Jennifer Alley	32-9			
1977	Wanda Briley	42-10			
1978	Wanda Briley	42-7			
1979	Nancy Little	23-15			
NAIA Carolinas Intercollegiate Athletic Conference (1980–1992)
1980	Nancy Little	21-18			
1981	Nancy Little	16-19			
1982	Nancy Little	25-13			NAIA Pool B (1-2 record)
1983	Nancy Little	23-8			NAIA Pool C (1-2 record)
1984	Nancy Little	19-9			
1985	Debbie Trogden	28-4			
1986	Debbie Trogden	38-9			NAIA Pool C (0-4 record)
1987	Debbie Trogden	23-10			
1988	Joe Ellenburg	19-10			NAIA Pool C (0-4 record)
1989	Joe Ellenburg	21-10			
1990	Joe Ellenburg	19-8			
1991	Joe Ellenburg	18-14			
1992	Joe Ellenburg	18-15			
Dual membership: NCAA DII and NAIA Carolinas Intercollegiate Athletic Conference (1993–1994)
1993	Joe Ellenburg	18-14			
1994	Joe Ellenburg/Teresa Faucette	16-23			
NCAA DII Carolinas-Virginia Athletics Conference (1995–1996)
1995	Joe Ellenburg/Teresa Faucette	20-9	9-0	1st	
1996	Teresa Faucette	26-9	9-0	1st	
NCAA DII Independent (1997–1998)
1997	Teresa Faucette	11-20			
1998	Jennifer Guzi	8-26			
NCAA Division I Big South Conference (1999–Present)
1999	Georgette Crawford	2-27	1-13	T-7th	
2000	Georgette Crawford	3-29	2-12	7th	
2001	Georgette Crawford	7-27	3-11	7th	
2002	Georgette Crawford	7-27	2-12	8th	
2003	Chad Esposito	8-28	1-13	8th	
2004	Chad Esposito	17-18	5-9	6th	
2005	Chad Esposito	16-17	5-9	T-5th	
2006	Chad Esposito	10-22	6-8	5th	
2007	Chad Esposito	24-9	8-4	3rd	
2008	Chad Esposito	26-7	13-3	T-1st	
2009	Jason Oliver	17-17	6-10	6th	
2010	Jason Oliver	22-13	13-3	2nd	NCAA First Round
2011	Jason Oliver	9-21	6-8	7th	
2012	Jason Oliver	20-11	9-5	3rd	
2013	Jason Oliver	16-15	9-5	3rd	
2014	Jason Oliver	13-16	6-8	6th	
2015	Jason Oliver	21-10	11-3	2nd	
2016	Tom Mendoza	23-10	11-5	3rd	NCAA First Round
2017	Tom Mendoza	24-8	16-0	1st	NCAA First Round
Total:		838–637 (.568)			
National champion Postseason invitational champion Conference regular season champion Conference regular season and conference tournament champion Division regular season champion Division regular season and conference tournament champion Conference tournament champion

== Postseason results ==
The Panthers have appeared in 3 NCAA tournaments and 4 NAIA tournaments. Their all-time record is 2–15.

=== NAIA tournament results ===
Year	Round	Opponents	Result
1982	Pool C	Kearney (Neb.); Winthrop; Fort Hays St.	L 15–9, 15-3; L 16–14, 15-8; W 15–12, 7–15, 15-9
1983	Pool C	Southwestern (Tx.); Franklin (Ind.); Montana Tech	L 16–14, 15-12; L 15–12, 15-3; W 15–0, 17-15
1986	Pool C	Texas Wesleyan; UW-Milwaukee; Biola; Missouri Western	L 15–8, 15-5; L 15–7, 15-11; L 15–7, 15-4; L 16–14, 15-9
1988	Pool C	Western Oregon; Ouachita Baptist; Southwestern (Tx.); Fort Lewis	L 15–6, 15-3; L 15–9, 9–15, 15-10; L 15–11, 15-2; L 14–16, 15–13, 17-15

=== NCAA tournament results ===
Year	Round	Opponent	Result
2010	First round	Duke	L 12–25, 20–25, 20–25
2016	First round	North Carolina	L 13–25, 12–25, 23–25
2017	First round	Purdue	L 25–21, 14–25, 22–25, 12–25
