= Jerritt Elliott =

American volleyball coach (born 1968)

Current position
- Title: Head coach
- Team: Texas
- Conference: SEC
- Record: 650–134 (.829)
- Annual salary: $557,500

Biographical details
- Born: April 28, 1968 (age 58); Pacific Palisades, Los Angeles, California
- Education: Pepperdine; Hawai'i; Cal State Northridge

Playing career
- 1986–1988: Pepperdine
- 1989–1990: Hawai'i

Coaching career (HC unless noted)
- 1991: Palisades
- 1992—1995: Westside Volleyball Club
- 1992—1993: Forum Team Cup Volleyball Club
- 1992—1994: Marymount High School
- 1993: Cal State Northridge (Assistant, Men's)
- 1995—1998: USC (Assistant)
- 1999—2000: USC (Interim Head Coach)
- 2001: USA Junior National Team (Assistant)
- 2008: USA Volleyball A2 Team
- 2001—present: Texas

Head coaching record
- Overall: 700–146 (.827)

Accomplishments and honors

Championships
- 3x NCAA national champions (2012, 2022, 2023); 15x Big 12 Champions (2007–09, 2011–15, 2017–23); Pac-10 Champions (2000)

Awards
- AVCA National Coach of the Year (2012); 7x AVCA Southwest Region Coach of the Year (2004, 2007, 2010–11, 2013, 2021–22); AVCA Pacific Region Coach of the Year (2000); 9x Big 12 Coach of the Year (2004, 2007, 2010–12, 2014, 2020–22)

Jerritt Kurt Elliott (born April 28, 1968) is an American volleyball head coach of the Texas Longhorns women's volleyball team since 2001.

== Early life ==
Elliott is a native of California and graduated from Palisades High School in Pacific Palisades, California, where he was a high school standout in volleyball. He was teammates with Olympic gold medalist Kent Steffes and led his high school team to an undefeated 36-0 record during his senior year.

After high school, he played men's volleyball at both Pepperdine from 1986–88 and Hawai'i from 1989–90 before graduating from Cal State Northridge in 1991 with a degree in kinesiology.

== Coaching ==
Prior to collegiate coaching, Elliott coached for high school and club volleyball teams. Additionally, he served as the director/head coach of the Westside Volleyball Club from 1992–95, where he led his 1994 squad to a fourth-place finish in the Nike Volleyball Festival. In 1992-93, Elliott assumed the role as head coach for the Forum Team Cup Volleyball.

=== Championship Coaching tree ===
Four former players and assistant coaches from Elliott's NCAA national championship teams at Texas have subsequently become head coaches at the NCAA Division I or international level.

Former players

- Sarah (Palmer) Baldwin – The starting libero on the Texas 2012 national championship team. She finished her collegiate career with 1,333 digs, ranking 6th all-time in Texas program history, and 10th all-time in digs-per-set in Texas program history. Baldwin became head coach of the Lipscomb Bisons women's volleyball program in January 2026.
- Haley Eckerman – An outside hitter on Texas's 2012 national championship team. She finished her collegiate career ranking 6th all-time in kills and career points categories in Texas program history. Eckerman became head coach of the Kent State Golden Flashes women's volleyball program in March 2022.

Former assistant coaches

- Salima Rockwell – The associate head coach and recruiting coordinator on Elliott's staff during Texas's 2012 national championship season. Rockwell became head coach of the Notre Dame Fighting Irish women's volleyball program in January 2022.
- Erik Sullivan – An assistant coach on Elliott's 2012 national championship staff and associate head coach during Texas's 2022 and 2023 national championship seasons. Sullivan was appointed head coach of the United States women's national volleyball team in January 2025.

=== Cal State Northridge (1993) ===
As an assistant coach on the men's volleyball team, Elliott helped the Matadors reach the NCAA national championship, where they fell to UCLA.

=== University of Southern California (1995–2000) ===
Elliott joined USC's coaching staff as an assistant coach under then-head coach Lisa Love. As an assistant at USC, Elliott helped guide the Women of Troy to finish in the top 15 nationally all four years. He also was instrumental in developing two-time All-American middle blocker Jasmina Marinkovic (1995–98).

Elliott was named the interim head coach for the 1999 and 2000 season, as then-head coach Mick Haley took on the head coach position for the USA Women's National Team at the 2000 Sydney Olympics. As interim head coach, Elliot led the team to its first NCAA Final Four appearance in 15 seasons as well as a share of the Pac-10 volleyball title. The Trojans featured two All-Americans in 2000 (April Ross and Jennifer Pahl) and six all-conference players, including the Pac-10 and Region Freshman of the Year (Ross). In both 2000 and 2001, Elliott’s recruiting class was regarded as No. 1 in the nation, the school’s first-ever No. 1 recruiting classes.

=== Texas (2001–present) ===
In April 2001, Elliott was appointed as Texas's new head volleyball coach. He quickly propelled Texas back into national prominence. Since he began in 2001, he has made every NCAA Tournament except one, has reached the Final Four 11 times, and won the national championship three times, in 2012, 2022 and 2023. Across all of Elliott’s former players, two of them are Division 1 head coaches currently- Sarah Baldwin of Lipscomb and Haley Eckerman of Kent State. Both of whom were a part of the Texas 2012 national championship team.

In the 2021 season, Elliott guided Texas to its fifth-consecutive and 14th overall Big 12 Championship. The Longhorns have won or shared ten of the last 11 league championships and 13 of the previous 15. He won his 8th Big 12 Coach of the Year award in 2021.

In the 2022 season, Elliott led Texas to the program's fourth national championship, going 28–1 on the season en route to winning its sixth straight Big 12 title. He was named Big 12 Coach of the Year while the team also had the league's player, setter, and libero of the year award winners. Texas senior Logan Eggleston was named the AVCA National Player of the Year, marking the first time in program history a Texas player won the award, and six players were named All-Americans.

== Head coaching record ==
Record table
Season	Team	Overall	Conference	Standing	Postseason
USC Trojans (Pacific-10 Conference) (1999–2000)
1999	USC	21–9	13–5	3rd	NCAA second round
2000	USC	29–3	16–2	T–1st	NCAA National semifinals
USC:		50–12 (.806)	29–7 (.806)		
Texas Longhorns (Big 12 Conference) (2001–2024)
2001	Texas	17–14	9–11	T–6th	NCAA second round
2002	Texas	23–9	13–4	4th	NCAA second round
2003	Texas	15–14	10–10	7th	
2004	Texas	26–5	16–4	2nd	NCAA regional semifinal
2005	Texas	24–5	17–3	2nd	NCAA second round
2006	Texas	24–7	16–4	3rd	NCAA Regional final
2007	Texas	27–4	19–1	T–1st	NCAA Regional final
2008	Texas	29–4	18–2	T–1st	NCAA semifinal
2009	Texas	29–2	19–1	1st	NCAA Runner-up
2010	Texas	27–6	18–2	2nd	NCAA semifinal
2011	Texas	25–5	15–1	1st	NCAA Regional final
2012	Texas	29–4	15–1	1st	NCAA Champion
2013	Texas	27–3	16–0	1st	NCAA semifinal
2014	Texas	27–3	15–1	1st	NCAA semifinal
2015	Texas	30–3	15–1	1st	NCAA Runner-up
2016	Texas	27–5	14–2	2nd	NCAA Runner-up
2017	Texas	27–3	16–0	1st	NCAA Regional final
2018	Texas	23–5	15–1	1st	NCAA Regional final
2019	Texas	23–4	15–1	T–1st	NCAA regional semifinal
2020	Texas	27–2	16–0	1st	NCAA Runner-up
2021	Texas	27–2	15–1	1st	NCAA Regional final
2022	Texas	28–1	15–1	1st	NCAA Champion
2023	Texas	28–4	17–1	1st	NCAA Champion
Texas Longhorns (SEC) (2024–present)
2024	Texas	20–7	13–3	2nd	NCAA regional semifinal
2025	Texas	26–4	13–2	3rd	NCAA regional final
2026	Texas	15–9	11–4	T–4th	TBD
Texas:		650–134 (.829)	391–62 (.863)		
Total:		700–146 (.827)			
National champion Postseason invitational champion Conference regular season champion Conference regular season and conference tournament champion Division regular season champion Division regular season and conference tournament champion Conference tournament champion

== Personal life ==
Elliott married Andrea Nucete-Elliott in 2018. His first wife was Washington State University two-time All-American volleyball player Sarah Silvernail, whom he married in 2004. He has two sons with her, Parker, born 2005, and Mack, born 2006, and a step-daughter, Kahle, born 1998.
