= Madisen Skinner =

American volleyball player (born 2001)

Personal information
- Nickname: Madi
- Born: July 1, 2001 (age 25); Katy, Texas, United States
- Height: 6 ft 2 in (188 cm)
- Education: Kentucky (2020–2021); Texas (2022–2024)

Volleyball information
- Position: Outside hitter/ Opposite
- Current club: LOVB Austin
- Number: 6

Career
| Years | Teams |
|---|---|
| 2025– | LOVB Austin |

National team
| 2024– | United States |

Madisen Skinner (born July 1, 2001) is an American professional volleyball player who plays for LOVB Austin and the United States national team. She played college volleyball for the Kentucky Wildcats and the Texas Longhorns, winning three NCAA championships (with Kentucky in 2020 and Texas in 2022 and 2023). She won the Honda Sports Award as the best player in college volleyball in 2023.

== Early life ==
Skinner was raised in Katy, Texas, the daughter of Rebecca and Brian Skinner. Her father played professional basketball in the NBA, and her sister Avery was an All-American volleyball player at Kentucky. She started playing volleyball seriously at age 15 and was on the Houston Skyline club team. She played high school volleyball for the Homeschool Christian Youth Association for three years, then transferred to Faith West Academy for her senior year in 2019–20. She co-captained the team and received All-American recognition. She committed to Kentucky as one of the top recruits of the class of 2020.

== College career ==
=== Kentucky Wildcats ===
Skinner played alongside her sister Avery in her first year with the Kentucky Wildcats in 2020–21. That season, she recorded 2.85 kills per set on a career-high .384 hitting percentage and was recognized with Southeastern Conference (SEC) all-freshman and All-SEC honors. She recorded a season-high 19 kills on .455 hitting in the 2020 national title game against Texas, helping the Wildcats win their first national championship. In her second year in 2021, she led the Wildcats with 3.78 kills per set on .282 hitting, again earning All-SEC honors. She entered the NCAA transfer portal after the season, choosing Texas following head coach Jerritt Elliott's recruitment effort.

=== Texas Longhorns ===
Skinner was selected as a co-captain in her first year at Texas in 2022, recording 3.66 kills per set on .307 hitting, and was named first-team All-Big 12 Conference and third-team All-American. She helped lead the Longhorns to a 28–1 record and the 2022 national championship, their first national title since 2012, recording 12 kills in the final against Louisville. In the 2023 season, she led the Big 12 with a career-high 4.80 kills per set and was named the Big 12 player of the year and first-team All-American. She led the Longhorns to defend their title at the NCAA tournament and was named the event's most outstanding player, recording 18 kills and a career-high 6 aces against Wisconsin in the semi-finals and 16 kills against Nebraska in the final. She received national player of the year honors from VolleyballMag.com and the Honda Sports Award and was named the Big 12's female athlete of the year. Skinner had a down year in her fifth season, hitting only .277 as Texas failed to defend their national title, falling in the NCAA tournament regional semifinals. She nevertheless made 4.35 kills per set and was named first-team All-Southeastern Conference.

== Professional career ==
=== LOVB Austin ===
In December 2024, Skinner joined LOVB Austin ahead of LOVB Pro's inaugural season. Austin was fifth of six teams in the 2025 regular season, going 5–11. However, in the inaugural LOVB finals, Austin clicked and completed two reverse sweeps, against Salt Lake and Atlanta, before winning the championship game in three sets over Omaha. Skinner had 17 kills and 4 blocks in the title game and was named LOVB Finals MVP.

== International career ==
Skinner was first selected to represent the United States national team at the 2024 FIVB Women's Volleyball Nations League.

Skinner was named to the wide roster in the 2025 Volleyball Nations League playing as an Outside in week one and more recently on the Opposite for week two. In week two in Belgrade, Skinner scored 32 points leading her team to a 3-2 victory against Serbia
