= Texas Longhorns women's volleyball =

Women's volleyball team of the University of Texas

- University: University of Texas at Austin
- Head coach: Jerritt Elliott (24th season)
- Conference: SEC
- Location: Austin, Texas, US
- Home arena: Gregory Gymnasium (capacity: 4,000)
- Nickname: Texas Longhorns
- Colors: Burnt orange and white

AIAW/NCAA tournament champion
- 1981, 1988, 2012, 2022, 2023

AIAW/NCAA tournament runner-up
- 1995, 2009, 2015, 2016, 2020*

AIAW/NCAA tournament semifinal
- 1981, 1986, 1987, 1988, 1995, 2008, 2009, 2010, 2012, 2013, 2014, 2015, 2016, 2020*, 2022, 2023

AIAW/NCAA Regional Final
- 1981, 1984, 1985, 1986, 1987, 1988, 1989, 1990, 1992, 1993, 1995, 1998, 2006, 2007, 2008, 2009, 2010, 2011, 2012, 2013, 2014, 2015, 2016, 2017, 2018, 2020*, 2021, 2022, 2023, 2025

AIAW/NCAA regional semifinal
- 1981, 1982, 1983, 1984, 1985, 1986, 1987, 1988, 1989, 1990, 1991, 1992, 1993, 1995, 1996, 1997, 1998, 2004, 2006, 2007, 2008, 2009, 2010, 2011, 2012, 2013, 2014, 2015, 2016, 2017, 2018, 2019, 2020*, 2021, 2022, 2023, 2024, 2025

AIAW/NCAA tournament appearance
- 1981, 1982, 1983, 1984, 1985, 1986, 1987, 1988, 1989, 1990, 1991, 1992, 1993, 1994, 1995, 1996, 1997, 1998, 1999, 2001, 2002, 2004, 2005, 2006, 2007, 2008, 2009, 2010, 2011, 2012, 2013, 2014, 2015, 2016, 2017, 2018, 2019, 2020*, 2021, 2022, 2023, 2024, 2025

Conference tournament champion
- SWC; 1992, 1993, 1995

Conference regular season champion
- SWC; 1982, 1983, 1984, 1985, 1986, 1987, 1988, 1989, 1990, 1991, 1992, 1993, 1995 Big 12; 1997, 2007, 2008, 2009, 2011, 2012, 2013, 2014, 2015, 2017, 2018, 2019, 2020, 2021, 2022, 2023 * Tournament played in spring 2021; season officially labeled "2020–21" by the NCAA

The Texas Longhorns women's volleyball team represents The University of Texas at Austin in NCAA Division I intercollegiate women's volleyball competition. The Longhorns competed in the Big 12 Conference through the 2023 season and moved to the Southeastern Conference (SEC) on July 1, 2024.

Texas has won five volleyball national championships – one AIAW championship in 1981 and four NCAA championships in 1988, 2012, 2022, and 2023. Beginning with the 1981 season, they have qualified for the AIAW/NCAA tournament every year except for two (42 of 44 seasons) and the most recent 21 years (2004–2024).

The volleyball program was founded in 1974. It has had seven head coaches in its history – the first four lasted just 1–2 years each: Pam Lampley (1974), Cheryl Lyman (1975), Jody Conradt (1976–77) and Linda Lowery (1978–79). Mick Haley coached from 1980 to 1996 before leaving to coach the Olympic team followed by the head coaching job at USC. Jim Moore coached 1997–2000 and Jerritt Elliott has coached Texas since 2001.

Texas reached the NCAA Final Four in 1986, 1987, 1988, 1995, 2008, 2009, 2010, 2012, 2013, 2014, 2015, 2016, 2020, 2022, and 2023, winning NCAA championships in 1988, 2012, 2022, and 2023.

During the 41-year history (1982–2022) of the AVCA Coaches Poll, the Longhorns have been ranked in the Top 10 in the final poll in 30 seasons, including the last 17 years at #8 or better (2006–2022). Only Nebraska and Stanford have more Top 10 final appearances than Texas.

Texas dominated Big 12 play for many years. Over the last 17 seasons Texas was a member of the Big 12 (2007–2023), Texas won 94% of their Big 12 matches (271 wins in 288 matches), finishing in first place fifteen times and second place twice. Overall, Texas has captured the Big 12 Volleyball championship sixteen times: in 1997, 2007–2009, 2011–2015 and 2017–2023.

During Texas Volleyball's fourteen seasons in the predecessor Southwest Conference (1982–1995), Texas was conference champion thirteen times and runner-up once.

Through 2018, Texas Volleyball has had 33 AVCA Division I All Americans, the fourth most of any program (through 2017).

== Program record and history ==
Record table
Season	Coach	Overall	Conference	Standing	Postseason
Pam Lampley (TAIAW) (1974)
1974	Pam Lampley	21–15–3		1st	
Pam Lampley:		21–15–3 (.577)			
Cheryl Lyman (TAIAW) (1975)
1975	Cheryl Lyman	25–20		8th	
Cheryl Lyman:		25–20 (.556)			
Jody Conradt (TAIAW) (1976–1977)
1976	Jody Conradt	28–19–5		2nd	AIAW National Qualifier
1977	Jody Conradt	34–19–2		4th	
Jody Conradt:		62–38–7 (.612)			
Linda Lowery (TAIAW) (1978–1979)
1978	Linda Lowery	34–16–1		5th	
1979	Linda Lowery	33–18–2		4th	
Linda Lowery:		67–34–3 (.659)			
Mick Haley (TAIAW) (1980–1981)
1980	Mick Haley	40–16		3rd	
1981	Mick Haley	60–6		1st	AIAW Champions
(Southwest Conference) (1982–1995)
1982	Mick Haley	31–15	9–1	1st	NCAA Regional semifinal
1983	Mick Haley	33–9	10–0	1st	NCAA Regional semifinal
1984	Mick Haley	32–7	9–1	1st	NCAA Regional Final
1985	Mick Haley	26–6	10–0	1st	NCAA Regional Final
1986	Mick Haley	29–6	10–0	1st	NCAA Final Four
1987	Mick Haley	25–10	10–0	1st	NCAA Final Four
1988	Mick Haley	34–5	10–0	1st	NCAA Champions
1989	Mick Haley	27–10	10–0	1st	NCAA Regional Final
1990	Mick Haley	31–4	10–0	1st	NCAA Regional Final
1991	Mick Haley	20–10	9–1	1st	NCAA Regional semifinal
1992	Mick Haley	29–6	9–1	1st	NCAA Regional Final
1993	Mick Haley	31–3	10–0	1st	NCAA Regional Final
1994	Mick Haley	23–10	8–2	2nd	NCAA Second Round
1995	Mick Haley	28–7	10–0	1st	NCAA Runner-Up
(Big 12) (1996)
1996	Mick Haley	23–7	16–4	2nd	NCAA Regional semifinal
Mick Haley:		522–137 (.792)	150–10 (.938)		
Jim Moore (Big 12) (1997–2000)
1997	Jim Moore	25–7	17–3	1st	NCAA Regional semifinal
1998	Jim Moore	27–5	18–2	2nd	NCAA Regional Final
1999	Jim Moore	22–8	15–5	3rd	NCAA Second Round
2000	Jim Moore	10–18	8–12	7th	
Jim Moore:		84–38 (.689)	58–22 (.725)		
Jerritt Elliott (Big 12) (2001–2023)
2001	Jerritt Elliott	17–14	9–11	6th	NCAA Second Round
2002	Jerritt Elliott	23–9	13–7	4th	NCAA Second Round
2003	Jerritt Elliott	15–14	10–10	7th	
2004	Jerritt Elliott	26–5	16–4	2nd	NCAA Regional semifinal
2005	Jerritt Elliott	24–5	17–3	2nd	NCAA Second Round
2006	Jerritt Elliott	24–7	16–4	3rd	NCAA Regional Final
2007	Jerritt Elliott	27–4	19–1	1st	NCAA Regional Final
2008	Jerritt Elliott	29–4	18–2	1st	NCAA Final Four
2009	Jerritt Elliott	29–2	19–1	1st	NCAA Runner-Up
2010	Jerritt Elliott	27–6	18–2	2nd	NCAA Final Four
2011	Jerritt Elliott	25–5	15–1	1st	NCAA Regional Final
2012	Jerritt Elliott	29–4	15–1	1st	NCAA Champions
2013	Jerritt Elliott	27–3	16–0	1st	NCAA Final Four
2014	Jerritt Elliott	27–3	15–1	1st	NCAA Final Four
2015	Jerritt Elliott	30–3	15–1	1st	NCAA Runner-Up
2016	Jerritt Elliott	27–5	14–2	2nd	NCAA Runner-Up
2017	Jerritt Elliott	27–3	16–0	1st	NCAA Regional Final
2018	Jerritt Elliott	23–5	15–1	1st	NCAA Regional Final
2019	Jerritt Elliott	23–4	15–1	1st	NCAA Regional semifinal
2020–21	Jerritt Elliott	27–2	16–0	1st	NCAA Runner-up
2021	Jerritt Elliott	27–2	15–1	1st	NCAA Regional Final
2022	Jerritt Elliott	28–1	15–1	1st	NCAA Champions
2023	Jerritt Elliott	28–4	17–1	1st	NCAA Champions
Jerritt Elliott (SEC) (2024–present)
2024	Jerritt Elliott	20–7	13–3	2nd	NCAA Regional Semifinal
2025	Jerritt Elliott	26–4	13–2	3rd	NCAA Regional Final
Jerritt Elliott:		635–125 (.836)	380–58 (.868)		
Total:		1396–404–13 (.774)	572–92 (.861)		
National champion Postseason invitational champion Conference regular season champion Conference regular season and conference tournament champion Division regular season champion Division regular season and conference tournament champion Conference tournament champion

== Year by year results ==
=== 1986–1988 ===
Women's volleyball joined the NCAA in 1982. Texas made its first NCAA final four in 1986, coming in third place overall and finishing the year with a 29–6 record. In 1987, the team made it back to the final four, once again coming into third place and finishing the season with a 25–10 record.

In 1988, Texas broke through and won the NCAA national championship by sweeping Hawai'i 3–0. Texas became the first team in NCAA history (and, as of 2017, remains one of two schools to do so) to sweep every NCAA tournament opponent 3-0 en route to winning the NCAA volleyball championship.

=== 1995–1996 ===
In 1995, Texas made it to the championship match, falling to Nebraska 3–1. Also in 1995, Demetria Sance became the program's first ever player to be named the National Freshman of the Year. University of Texas joined the Big 12 starting in 1996. Coach Mick Haley left the University Texas to manage the U.S. Olympic Team following a successful 1996 season.

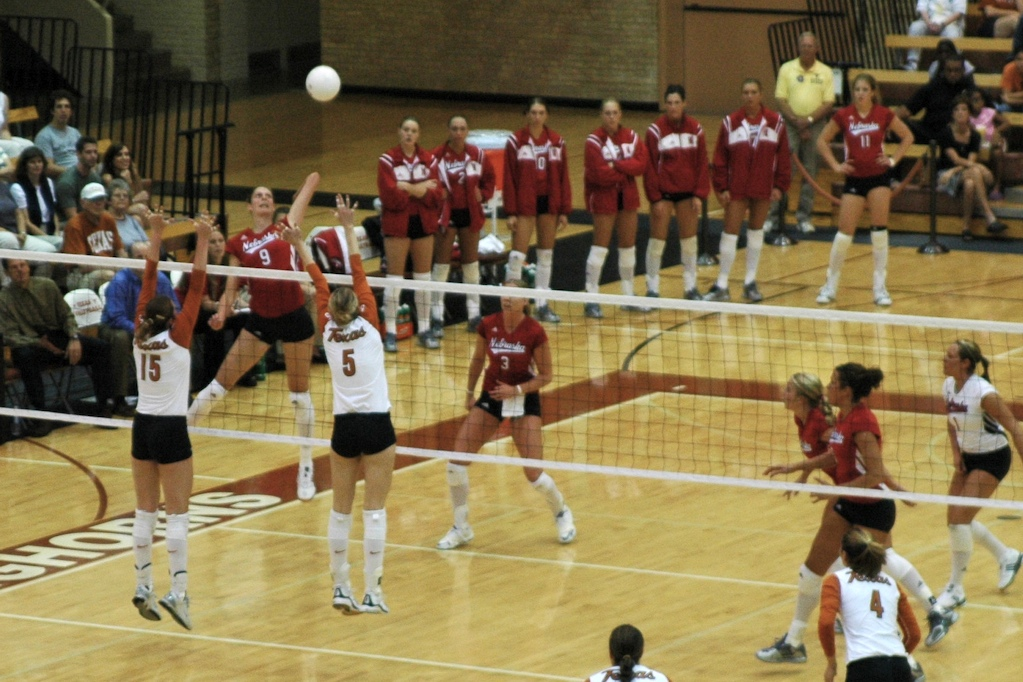
Texas playing Nebraska in 2004

=== 1997–2006: two coach changes but modest results ===
Haley's replacement Jim Moore's started strong by winning the Big 12 in 1997, but his record began to worsen by 1999. In the disastrous 2000 season, a first ever losing record, a worst ever seventh place conference finish and missing the NCAA tournament for the first time, lead to Moore's replacement by Jerritt Elliott before the 2001 season. In 2003, Texas finished at 15–14, again finished seventh in the conference and again missed the NCAA tournament under Elliott. However, the Longhorns began to rebound for good in 2004 (Elliott's fourth year). In 2006, although finishing third in the conference, the Longhorns reached their first NCAA regional final in eight years.

=== 2007–2012 (National Title) ===
In 2007, Texas captured its second ever Big 12 title (and first conference title in ten years), sharing it with Nebraska and finished with a 19–1 conference record. The 2007 squad finished off the season with a 27–4 record and made it to the NCAA regional finals as the tournament's overall 4th seed. 2007 Big 12 Freshman of the Year Juliann Faucette became the program's second ever AVCA National Freshman of the Year and earned AVCA First Team All-America honors – becoming only the fourth true freshman in eight years to be named on the first team.

In 2008, Texas shared the Big 12 title with Nebraska with an 18–2 record. The team finished 29–4 overall, making it to the NCAA Final Four, where they took a 2–0 lead on Stanford but lost the next three to lose in five sets. Junior outside hitter Destinee Hooker was named to the Final Four All-Tournament Team and was also a Honda Sports Award nominee for the top volleyball player in the country. Hooker, junior Ashley Engle and senior Lauren Paolini were also named AVCA First Team All-Americans.

Led by senior Destinee Hooker, the 2009 Texas volleyball team lost just one regular season match to Iowa State and was ranked No. 2 in the country all season long. In the 2009 NCAA tournament, the Longhorns defeated Big 12 opponent Nebraska in the regional final, becoming the first team to ever beat Nebraska three times in a season. In the Final Four, the team soundly defeated Minnesota, and met No. 1 and undefeated Penn State in the final.

Texas looked to be on the brink of a huge upset, as they went up 2 sets to 0 against the Lions. However, Penn State stormed back to push the match to a fifth set, which they eventually won, 15–13. Penn State won their third consecutive NCAA title and denied Texas its first NCAA title since 1988. Despite the loss, Destinee Hooker was named the Final Four's Most Outstanding Player, as she had 34 kills in the championship match, which is the most kills by a single player in the NCAA final's history. It was also Hooker's career high in a single match, her final match as a collegiate player. Because of the high level of play by both teams throughout the long match, many people believe that it was the best NCAA final in history.

In 2012, Texas once again advanced to the NCAA final game, in which they played Oregon for the national championship. Texas swept the Ducks, 3–0, and claimed its first national title in volleyball since 1988, giving the university its 50th overall national championship, 42 of which are NCAA championships.

=== 2013–2018 ===
The program continued to excel following their national championship. In 2013 and 2014, they won the Big 12 and advanced to the national semifinals. In 2015, they once again won the Big 12 and advanced to the national championship game, but lost to Nebraska. In 2016, they finished second in the Big 12, snapping a streak of five consecutive Big 12 titles. However, they once again advanced to the national championship game, this time losing to Stanford.

Texas, with a perfect 16–0 record, won the Big 12 championship in 2017 for the tenth time. In the 2017 NCAA tournament Texas was again eliminated by Stanford, this time by a 3–0 score in the Regional Final.

In 2018, despite two losses to nemesis, and eventual National Champion, Stanford during the regular season, Texas continued its winning ways at the conference level by easily clinching the Big 12 with a 15–1 record.

Texas was seeded #5 in the 2018 NCAA Tournament. Texas defeated Stephen F Austin in the first round and Texas State in the second round each by a 3–0 score. Texas next beat Michigan 3–1 in the third round. However, Texas then lost 0–3 to #4 seed and regional host BYU in the Regional Final.

Texas reached the Regional Final (round of 8) thirteen years in a row (2006–2018), advanced to the Final Four in 8 of 12 years (2008–2010, 2012–2016), and had three runner-up finishes 2009, 2015–2016, but won the NCAA championship just once over this period (in 2012).

=== 2019–2024 (Two National Titles) ===
Early in 2019, Texas had yet another loss to eventual National Champion Stanford and their first ever loss to an improved (final ranking #24) Rice team but also had two significant early season wins over (#4) Minnesota and (#17) BYU. During conference play, Texas swept NCAA #1 and undefeated Baylor 3–0 at home in late October in Austin to become the new NCAA #1. However, Baylor returned the favor by defeating Texas 3–2 in Waco in mid-November to retake NCAA #1. Texas at 15-1 was 2019 co-champion of the Big 12 with Baylor.

Texas was seeded #2 in the 2019 NCAA tournament. Texas beat U. Albany 3–0 in the first round. Texas survived 3–2 over UCSB in the second round. Texas then was surprisingly upset by unranked Louisville 3–2 in the regional semifinal—Texas's worst NCAA tournament showing since 2005. It snapped Texas' 36 match home winning streak, Texas' streak of 13 straight Regional Finals appearances and was Louisville's first ever appearance in the Regional Final. Louisville was promptly swept 3–0 in the Regional Final by #7 Minnesota who Texas had swept during the regular season.

Texas was seeded #4 in the 2020–21 NCAA tournament, which was played in April 2021 due to COVID-19. Texas received a bye in the first round and beat Wright State 3–0 in the second round. Texas beat traditional volleyball power Penn State 3–1 in the regional semifinal and advanced to their first final 4 since 2016 by beating Nebraska 3–1 in Omaha. Texas then advanced to the Finals by sweeping previously undefeated #1 Wisconsin 3–0, but losing there 3–1 to first-time Final Four participant Kentucky.

In 2021, Texas spent much of the regular season undefeated and #1 ranked before losing one of two matches to Baylor. Despite the loss, Texas again won the Big 12 with a 15–1 record. Texas was seeded #2 in the 2021 NCAA tournament. Texas beat Sacred Heart 3–0 in the first round. Texas beat Rice 3–0 in the second round. After being down 2–0, Texas battled back to beat #15 Washington 3–2 in the regional semifinal. In the regional final, Texas lost to former SWC foe (& only present or past conference foe against which Texas has a losing record) #10 Nebraska 3–1.

In 2022, Texas again spent much of the regular season #1 ranked except for a brief period at #2 immediately following their only loss of the regular season—to Iowa State. Despite the loss, Texas again won the Big 12 with a 15–1 record. Texas at 22-1 was seeded #1 overall in the 2022 NCAA tournament. Texas beat Farleigh Dickinson 3–0 in the first round (including a dominating 25–6 win in the first set). Texas has won all 39 first round matches that it has contested in the NCAA tournament. Texas beat Georgia 3–0 in the second round. Texas has won its last 17 consecutive NCAA second round matches (2006–22). Texas then proceeded to defeat both #4 seed Marquette and #2 seed Ohio State by 3-1 scores to clinch the Regional Final and a trip to Omaha for the final four. In Omaha, Texas won its fourth national title by defeating San Diego 3–1 in the semis and then sweeping #1 seed Louisville 3–0 in the finals. Outside hitter Logan Eggleston was AVCA player of the year during the regular 2022 season and also MVP of the 2022 NCAA volleyball tournament.

In 2023, Texas started the year as #1 in the AVCA poll, yet a 2-2 start to the season with losses to Long Beach State and #2 Stanford would see the Longhorns fall to #7. Despite a third loss to #11 Washington State, the Longhorns would finish the year as Big 12 Champions again with a 15-1 record and go 22-4 in the regular season. Texas would grab a #2 seed in the 2023 NCAA tournament. Texas would win over in-state rivals in Texas A&M and SMU in the first two rounds. In the regional semifinals, Texas would overcome a 2-1 deficit against #3 Tennessee to win 3-2 and advance to their 4th straight regional final. In the final, Texas would get revenge over #1 Stanford and win the match 3-1, giving the Longhorns their 9th national semifinals appearance since 2010. In the semifinals, Texas would defeat #1 Wisconsin 3-1, winning the final two sets by a combined score of 50-29, advancing to their second straight national championship game. Texas would go on to beat #1 Nebraska in straight sets through a dominant defensive performance with a .019 defensive hitting percentage. Madisen Skinner would be named the tournament MOP and Texas would get three players on the All-Tournament Final Four team.

In 2024, Texas finished second to Kentucky in the SEC with a 13-3 conference record. Texas was eliminated in the NCAA Tournament by #6 Creighton in the Regional Semifinals and finished with a 20-7 overall record. 2024 was the first year since 2005 that Texas neither won/shared a conference title nor reached the NCAA Regional Finals.

== All-time series records ==
Big 12 Opponents
Opponent	Overall	Home	Away	Neutral
Baylor	91–4	48–0	38–4	5–0
Iowa State	50–6	29–0	21–6	0–0
Kansas	50–5	25–1	22–4	3–0
Kansas State	50–8	26–3	23–5	1–0
Oklahoma	61–4	32–2	26–2	3–0
TCU	22–1	13–0	9–1	0–0
Texas Tech	94–9–2	44–3	43–2	7–4–2
West Virginia	22–0	11–0	11–0	0–0
Through November 23, 2022

Former Big 12 and SWC Opponents
Opponent	Overall	Home	Away	Neutral
Colorado	27-8	14-4	12-4	1-0
Houston	46-16	22-4	19-8	5-4
Missouri	22-10	13-3	9-7	0-0
Nebraska	24-34	13-10	6-18	5-6
Rice	38-2	19-1	15-1	4-0
Texas A&M	76-23	39-5	25-13	12-5
Through October 3, 2022

== Beach volleyball ==
In April 2008, the American Volleyball Coaches Association and Association of Volleyball Professionals sponsored the third annual Collegiate Beach Volleyball Championship, adhering to NCAA guidelines for college volleyball. The Longhorns won the championship with a roster consisting of Jennifer Doris, Ashley Engle, Elizabeth Graham, Kiley Hall, Alyson Jennings, Heather Kisner, Chelsey Klein, Alex Lewis and Michelle Moriarty. Each school fielded four teams of two players. The field included Nebraska, Clemson, San Diego, USC, Texas and Wisconsin, all of whom were ranked in the 2007 Coaches Top 25 final poll (indoor). The Longhorns had finished the 2007 season ranked sixth.

On August 30, 2022, UT announced the addition of Beach Volleyball as the 21st Intercollegiate Sport at the University of Texas.

== Home court ==
- Gregory Gymnasium (1974–1989, 1998–2019, 2021–Present)
- Frank Erwin Center (1984, 1986–1990, 1996–1997)(select games), 2020 (due to Covid restriction)
- Recreational Sports Center (1990–1997)(during renovation of Gregory Gym)

== Attendance record ==
All-Time Home Attendance
#	Date	Opponent	Site	Attendance
1	November 29, 1996	Nebraska	Frank Erwin Center	6,385
2	November 13, 1996	Texas A&M	Frank Erwin Center	6,123
3	December 10, 2022	Ohio State	Gregory Gym	5,344
4	December 11, 2021	Nebraska	Gregory Gym	5,080
5	October 21, 1998	Texas A&M	Gregory Gym	5,072*
6	August 31, 2022	Minnesota	Gregory Gym	4,992
7	November 5, 1989	Hawaii	Gregory Gym	4,955*
8	October 26, 2022	Texas Tech	Gregory Gym	4,915
9	November 9, 2022	Iowa State	Gregory Gym	4,888
10	December 2, 2022	Georgia	Gregory Gym	4,812
11	November 16, 2022	Kansas	Gregory Gym	4,679
12	September 24, 1997	Texas A&M	Frank Erwin Center	4,665
13	November 19, 2022	Baylor	Gregory Gym	4,648
14	September 19, 1996	Florida	Frank Erwin Center	4,632
15	December 8, 2022	Marquette	Gregory Gym	4,491
16	December 9, 2021	Washington	Gregory Gym	4,488
17	October 22, 2022	West Virginia	Gregory Gym	4,475
18	November 12, 2021	Oklahoma	Gregory Gym	4,422
19	October 12, 2022	Kansas State	Gregory Gym	4,418
20	October 25, 2014	Oklahoma	Gregory Gym	4,402
* Before Gregory Gym Reconfiguration

Gregory Gym Attendance
#	Date	Opponent	Attendance
1	December 10, 2022	Ohio State	5,344
2	December 11, 2021	Nebraska	5,080
3	October 21, 1998	Texas A&M	5,072*
4	August 31, 2022	Minnesota	4,992
5	November 5, 1989	Hawaii	4,955*
6	October 26, 2022	Texas Tech	4,915
7	November 9, 2022	Iowa State	4,888
8	December 2, 2022	Georgia	4,812
9	November 16, 2022	Kansas	4,679
10	November 19, 2022	Baylor	4,648
11	December 8, 2022	Marquette	4,491
12	December 9, 2021	Washington	4,488
13	October 22, 2022	West Virginia	4,475
14	November 12, 2021	Oklahoma	4,422
15	October 12, 2022	Kansas State	4,418
16	October 25, 2014	Oklahoma	4,402
17	November 30, 2013	Baylor	4,392
18	September 7, 2013	Penn State	4,373
19	October 5, 2022	TCU	4,369
20	September 8, 2017	Minnesota	4,353
* Before Reconfiguration

== Awards and honors ==
- Logan Eggleston - 2023 NCAA Woman of the Year Award

== See also ==
- List of NCAA Division I women's volleyball programs
