= Erik Sullivan =

American volleyball player (born 1972)

Erik Sullivan OLY
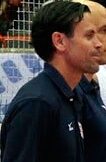
- Sullivan in 2015

Personal information
- Full name: Erik Thomas Sullivan
- Born: August 9, 1972 (age 54) Encinitas, California, U.S.
- Education: UCLA
- Height: 6 ft 4 in (193 cm)

Volleyball information
- Position: Libero
- Number: 5 (national team); 15 (UCLA)

National team
- Years: Team
- 1997–2004: United States

Erik Thomas Sullivan (born August 9, 1972) is an American former volleyball player and two-time Olympian. He played for the United States men's national volleyball team at the 2000 Summer Olympics in Sydney and 2004 Summer Olympics in Athens.

== College ==
At UCLA, Sullivan helped his team win two national titles, in 1993 and 1995, and was an All-American in 1992. In 1995, as a senior, he captained the team to a 31–1 record. In 2023, he was inducted into the UCLA Athletics Hall of Fame.

== Coaching career ==
Sullivan spent 14 years coaching under Jerritt Elliott at Texas after stints at Nebraska and Colorado.

On January 6, 2025, Sullivan was named head coach for the United States women's national volleyball team after serving various assistant and consulting roles with the team.

== Awards ==
- All-American 1992
- Two-time NCAA Champion 1993, 1995
- UCLA Athletics Hall of Fame 2023
