= Gregory Gymnasium =

Indoor arena in Austin, Texas

- Greg
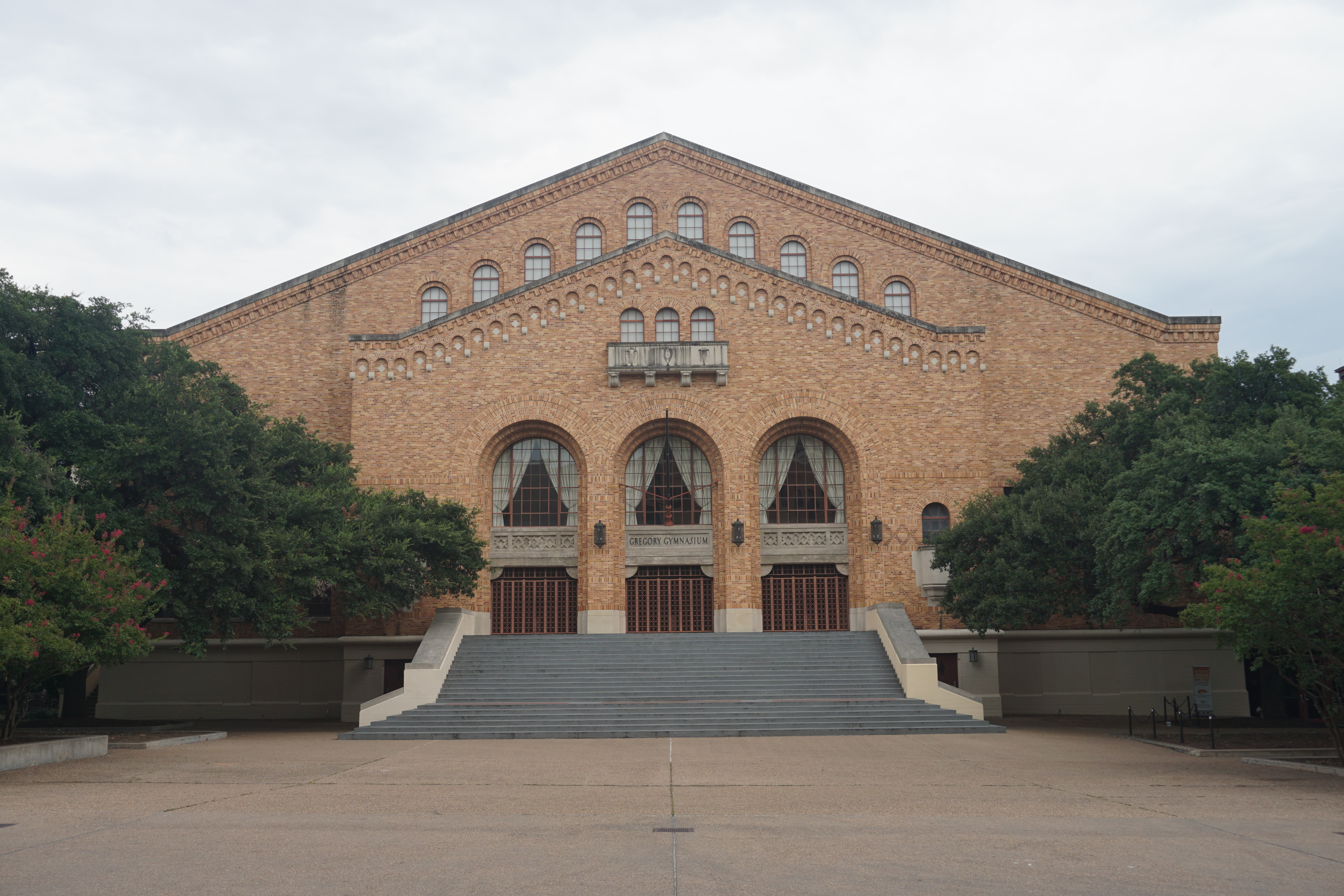
- The front of Gregory Gymnasium
- Interactive map of Gregory Gymnasium
- Address: 2101 Speedway; Austin, Texas 78712
- Coordinates: 30.284184°N 97.736485°W
- Owner: University of Texas at Austin
- Operator: University of Texas at Austin
- Capacity: 4,000 (volleyball)
- Record attendance: 5,344

Construction
- Groundbreaking: May 10, 1929
- Built: April 12, 1930
- Opened: 1930
- Cost: $500,000 ($9.64 million in 2025 dollars)

Tenants
- Texas Longhorns (NCAA); Women's Volleyball (1974–1989, 1998–2019, 2021–present); Men's basketball (1930–1977); Women's basketball (1972–1977) Austin Aces (WTT) (2014–2015)

Gregory Gymnasium is the 4,000-seat current home of the University of Texas Longhorns women's volleyball team, and former home of the Longhorn basketball and swimming teams. The basketball teams moved out in 1977 to the Erwin Center. It also served as the home court for the Austin Aces of World Team Tennis from 2014 to 2015.

The gymnasium has undergone several renovations, and now consists of the original gym and a four-story annex that serves as a gymnasium with an indoor jogging track, basketball courts, racquetball and squash courts, an indoor rock-climbing wall, a moderately-sized weight room, and a cardiovascular exercise facility. All University students can use the gymnasium for free. The gymnasium is available at a low cost to university alumni and their spouses.

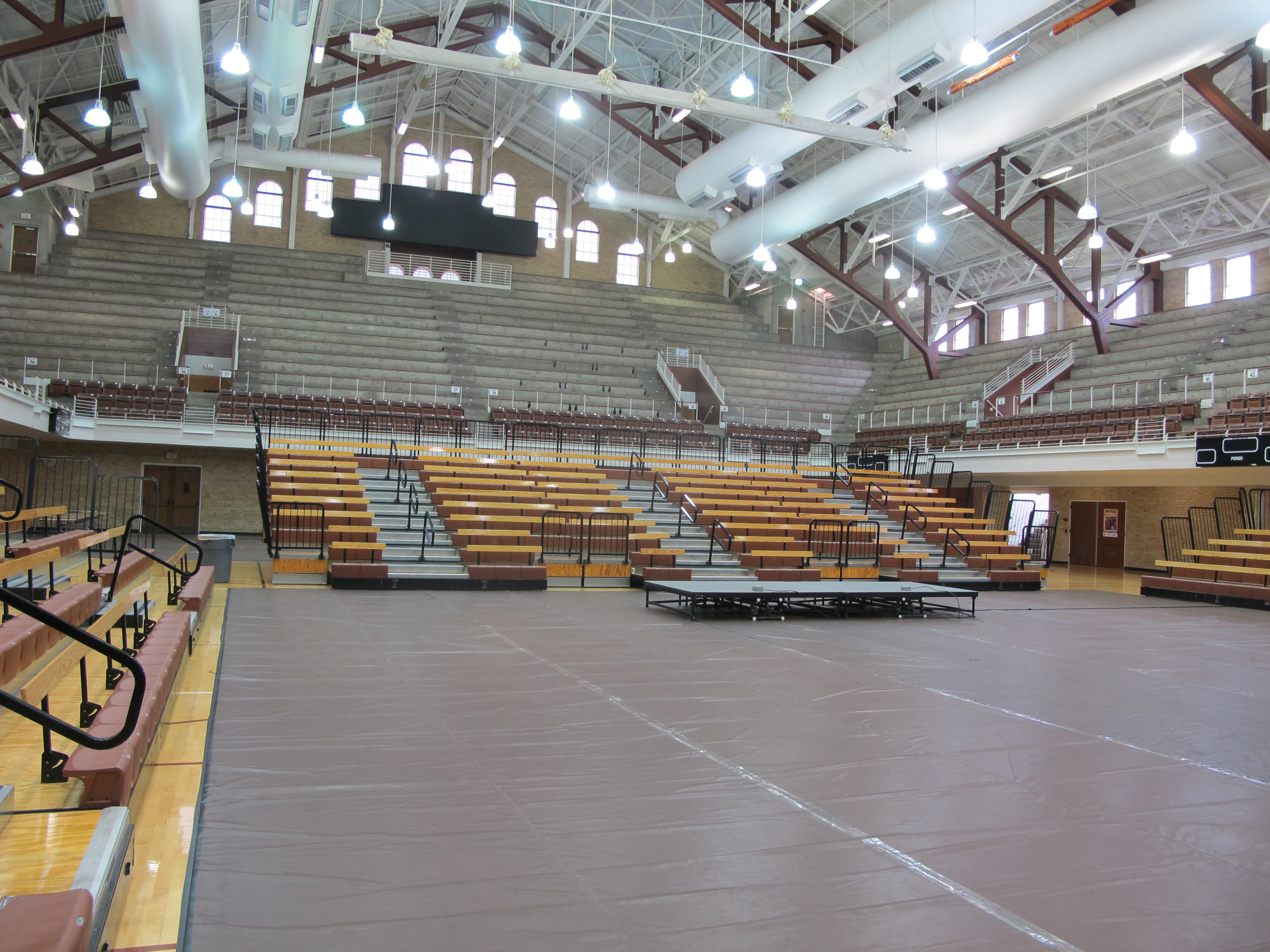
Gregory Gym interior, 2016

== History ==
Following the destruction of Texas' first basketball gymnasium in a fire in 1928, former U.S. Attorney General T.W. Gregory seized the opportunity to spearhead a fundraising initiative for a new facility, later becoming Gregory Gymnasium.

Originally built in 1930 with an estimated cost of $500,000, the gym was named after its main advocate and planner, Thomas Watt Gregory. Gregory, an alumnus of the University, served on the University's Board of Regents and as United States Attorney General before the gym was built. On December 5, 1930, Texas celebrated its inaugural men's basketball game at Gregory Gym.

By the late 1920s, plans expanded to include a women's gym and student union building, known as the "Union Project". Despite economic hardships during the Great Depression, the Texas Exes contributed over $600,000 to realize this ambitious project, leading to the construction of Gregory Gym and other essential campus facilities. A process that became synonymous with the gymnasium was course registration each semester, where students endured long waits in hot weather to secure their class schedules.

From 1930 to 1951, Gregory Gym hosted Fight Night, an annual boxing event that drew crowds from both the university and the wider community. Sporting events, including varsity basketball games and intramural competitions, added to the gym's reputation as a center for athletic excellence and spectatorship.

By the 1950s and '60s, Gregory Gymnasium emerged as a prominent cultural venue and entertainment center on campus. It hosted renowned speakers, authors, and performers, attracting large audiences for literary readings, jazz concerts, and theatrical productions. Notable events included poetry readings by T.S. Eliot and performances by jazz legends like Louis Armstrong and the Count Basie group.

In 1977, after 46 years as the home of men's basketball, the gym hosted its final Southwest Conference tournament play-in game, marking the end of an era in collegiate sports. The subsequent move of basketball games to the Frank Erwin Center distanced the team from its student fanbase, altering the dynamic of campus athletics.

In November 1997, Gregory Gym underwent a substantial renovation, closing for 22 months to modernize its facilities. The renovation aimed to enhance the building's functionality and aesthetics, incorporating features such as natural lighting, open lounge areas, and central air-conditioning, reflecting a commitment to meeting the evolving needs of the campus community.

On May 1, 2017, a fatal stabbing occurred near the gym where Kendrex J. White, a 21-year-old student, attacked multiple passersby. Student Harrison Brown was fatally stabbed and three others were wounded before White was apprehended by police. The incident prompted discussions about campus safety and mental health support, ultimately leading to efforts to enhance security measures at Gregory Gym and across the university campus. White was diagnosed by psychologists as suffering from schizoaffective and bipolar disorders and ruled not guilty by reason of insanity by State District Judge Tamara Needles.

On April 24, 2024, the gym's plaza was the initial gathering site of a student protest regarding the Israel-Hamas War. By noon, hundreds of students had gathered, leading to police on horseback forcing the protestors away from the area and subsequent protests by the UT Tower. The protests occurred amidst the ongoing nationwide demonstrations on college campuses.

== Attendance record ==
Volleyball attendance record
#	Date	Opponent	Attendance
1	December 10, 2022	Ohio State	5,344
2	December 11, 2021	Nebraska	5,080
3	October 21, 1998	Texas A&M	5,072*
4	August 31, 2022	Minnesota	4,992
5	November 5, 1989	Hawaii	4,955*
6	October 26, 2022	Texas Tech	4,915
7	November 9, 2022	Iowa State	4,888
8	September 28, 2023	BYU	4,844
9	December 2, 2022	Georgia	4,812
10	October 2, 2024	South Carolina	4,738
11	November 25, 2023	Texas Tech	4,725
12	September 11, 2024	Houston	4,719
13	September 3, 2023	Stanford	4,707
14	November 16, 2022	Kansas	4,679
15	September 29, 2023	BYU	4,667
16	September 15, 2023	Washington State	4,656
17	November 15, 2023	Iowa State	4,649
18	October 18, 2024	Arkansas	4,648
	November 19, 2022	Baylor	4,648
20	October 26, 2023	Baylor	4,590
* Before Reconfiguration

Updated: December 1, 2024
