= 1997 NCAA Division I women's volleyball tournament =

Volleyball competition

1997 NCAA women's Division I volleyball tournament
- 1997 NCAA Final Four logo
- Champions: Stanford (4th title)
- Runner-up: Penn State (2nd title match)
- Semifinalists: Long Beach State (5th Final Four); Florida (4th Final Four)
- Winning coach: Don Shaw (4th title)
- Most outstanding player: Terri Zemaitis (Penn State)
- Final Four All-Tournament Team: Kristin Folkl (Stanford); Paula McNamee (Stanford); Lisa Sharpley (Stanford); Carrie Schonveld (Penn State); Lauren Cacciamani (Penn State)

The 1997 NCAA Division I women's volleyball tournament began with 56 teams and ended on December 20, 1997, when Stanford defeated Penn State 3 games to 2 in the NCAA championship match.

Stanford won their second straight title and 4th in 6 years. After winning the first two games 15-10, 15-6, Penn State forced a fifth game as the Nittany Lions won the next two 15-2, 17-15. In the decisive fifth game, Stanford jumped out to the 12-8 lead before Kristin Folkl recorded the final three kills for the 15-9 win. Stanford finished the year 33-2, with their only two losses coming from Penn State in the early season.

The 1997 NCAA tournament was the first, and would be the last, year with 56 tournament teams, as it was expanded from 48 teams (1993-1996). In 1998, the tournament would be expanded to its present-day 64 tournament teams.

== Play-in games ==
| November 21 |
| Morgan State (MEAC, 24-9) | 3 |
| Grambling State (SWAC, ?) | 0 |

| November 23 |
| Lehigh (Patriot, 17-12) | 3 |
| Wagner (Northeast, 10-19) | 1 |

== Records ==
East Regional
| Seed | School | Conference | Berth Type | Record |
|---|---|---|---|---|
| | BYU | WAC | Automatic | 27-5 |
| | Fairfield | MAAC | Automatic | 25-9 |
| | Hofstra | America East | Automatic | 23-13 |
| | Maryland | ACC | At-large | 26-1 |
| | Miami (OH) | Mid-American | At-large | 23-7 |
| | Michigan | Big Ten | At-large | 20-11 |
| | Minnesota | Big Ten | At-large | 22-9 |
| | Northern Illinois | Mid-American | Automatic | 26-3 |
| | Ohio State | Big Ten | At-large | 22-10 |
| | Penn State | Big Ten | Auto (shared) | 30-1 |
| | Princeton | Ivy League | Automatic | 22-5 |
| | Temple | Atlantic 10 | Automatic | 29-4 |
| | Texas A&M | Big 12 | At-large | 24-7 |
| | Villanova | Big East | At-large | 20-8 |

Pacific Regional
| Seed | School | Conference | Berth Type | Record |
|---|---|---|---|---|
| | Butler | Midwestern Collegiate | Automatic | 27-6 |
| | Cal State Sacramento | Big Sky | Automatic | 23-8 |
| | Chattanooga | Southern | Automatic | 26-9 |
| | Hawaii | WAC | At-large | 25-7 |
| | Kansas State | Big 12 | At-large | 20-12 |
| | Long Beach State | Big West | Automatic | 30-1 |
| | Loyola Marymount | West Coast | At-large | 21-6 |
| | Michigan State | Big Ten | At-large | 22-11 |
| | Morgan State | MEAC | Automatic | 25-9 |
| | Nebraska | Big 12 | At-large | 25-6 |
| | Pacific | Big West | At-large | 22-8 |
| | San Diego | West Coast | Automatic | 25-3 |
| | USC | Pac-10 | At-large | 21-5 |
| | Washington | Pac-10 | At-large | 18-9 |

Central Regional
| Seed | School | Conference | Berth Type | Record |
|---|---|---|---|---|
| | American | CAA | Automatic | 30-3 |
| | Arkansas | SEC | At-large | 29-5 |
| | Arkansas-Little Rock | Sun Belt | Automatic | 16-12 |
| | Clemson | ACC | Automatic | 26-7 |
| | Colorado State | WAC | At-large | 26-5 |
| | Florida | SEC | Automatic | 31-3 |
| | Florida State | ACC | At-large | 25-8 |
| | Lehigh | Patriot | Automatic | 18-12 |
| | Liberty | Big South | Automatic | 26-8 |
| | Notre Dame | Big East | Automatic | 23-8 |
| | South Florida | Conference USA | At-large | 25-8 |
| | UCF | Trans America | Automatic | 27-3 |
| | Washington State | Pac-10 | At-large | 24-6 |
| | Wisconsin | Big Ten | Auto (shared) | 28-2 |

Mountain Regional
| Seed | School | Conference | Berth Type | Record |
|---|---|---|---|---|
| | Arizona | Pac-10 | At-large | 20-6 |
| | Colorado | Big 12 | At-large | 20-8 |
| | Houston | Conference USA | Automatic | 22-9 |
| | Illinois State | Missouri Valley | Automatic | 24-8 |
| | Oklahoma | Big 12 | At-large | 19-12 |
| | Oral Roberts | Mid-Continent | Automatic | 28-9 |
| | Pepperdine | West Coast | At-large | 23-5 |
| | South Carolina | SEC | At-large | 20-7 |
| | Stanford | Pac-10 | Automatic | 28-2 |
| | Stephen F. Austin | Southland | Automatic | 23-12 |
| | Tennessee Tech | Ohio Valley | Automatic | 23-9 |
| | Texas | Big 12 | Automatic | 23-6 |
| | UC Santa Barbara | Big West | At-large | 29-4 |
| | UCLA | Pac-10 | At-large | 16-12 |

== Brackets ==
=== East Regional - University Park, PA ===
First round
Northern Illinois | 3
Villanova | 2
Ohio State | 3
Fairfield | 0
Maryland | 3
Princeton | 0
Temple | 2
Michigan | 3
Hofstra | 0
Texas A&M | 3
Miami (Oh.) | 0
Minnesota | 3

Second round
1 | Penn State | 3
Northern Illinois | 0
Ohio State | 3
Maryland | 0
Michigan | 0
Texas A&M | 3
Minnesota | 0
2 | BYU | 3

Regional semifinals
1 | Penn State | 3
Ohio State | 0
Texas A&M | 2
2 | BYU | 3

Regional final
1 | Penn State | 3
2 | BYU | 0

=== Central Regional - Madison, WI ===
First round
Central Florida | 3
Clemson | 0
Arkansas | 3
Arkansas-Little Rock | 0
Notre Dame | 3
Liberty | 0
American | 1
Colorado State | 3
Lehigh | 0
Washington State | 3
Florida State | 2
South Florida | 3

Second round
1 | Wisconsin | 3
Central Florida | 0
Arkansas | 1
Notre Dame | 3
Colorado State | 1
Washington State | 3
South Florida | 0
2 | Florida | 3

Regional semifinals
1 | Wisconsin | 3
Notre Dame | 1
Washington State | 0
2 | Florida | 3

Regional final
1 | Wisconsin | 2
2 | Florida | 3

=== Pacific Regional - Long Beach, CA ===
First round
Hawaiʻi | 0
Loyola Marymount | 3
Washington | 3
Chattanooga | 0
Pacific | 3
Cal St. Sacramento | 1
Kansas State | 1
San Diego | 3
Morgan State | 0
Southern California | 3
Butler | 0
Michigan State | 3

Second round
1 | Long Beach State | 3
Loyola Marymount | 0
Washington | 3
Pacific | 1
San Diego | 2
Southern California | 3
Michigan State | 0
2 | Nebraska | 3

Regional semifinals
1 | Long Beach State | 3
Washington | 0
Southern California | 2
2 | Nebraska | 3

Regional final
1 | Long Beach State | 3
2 | Nebraska | 0

=== Mountain Regional - Stanford, CA ===
First round
Oklahoma | 3
Houston | 0
Colorado | 3
Tennessee Tech | 0
Arizona | 2
Oral Roberts | 3
Illinois State | 0
South Carolina | 3
Stephen F. Austin | 0
Texas | 3
UCLA | 3
Pepperdine | 1

Second round
1 | Stanford | 3
Oklahoma | 0
Colorado | 3
Oral Roberts | 2
South Carolina | 0
Texas | 3
UCLA | 2
2 | UCSB | 3

Regional semifinals
1 | Stanford | 3
Colorado | 0
Texas | 0
2 | UCSB | 3

Regional final
1 | Stanford | 3
2 | UCSB | 0

== Final Four - Spokane Arena, Spokane, Washington ==
National Semifinals
1 | Penn State | 3
2 | Florida | 0
1 | Long Beach State | 1
1 | Stanford | 3

National Championship
1 | Penn State | 2
1 | Stanford | 3
