= Hawaii Rainbow Wahine volleyball =

American college volleyball team

- University: University of Hawaii at Manoa
- Athletic director: Matt Elliott
- Head coach: Joshua Walker (1st season)
- Conference: Mountain West
- Location: Manoa, Hawaii, US
- Home arena: Stan Sheriff Center (capacity: 10,300)
- Nickname: Rainbow Wahine
- Colors: Green, black, silver, and white

AIAW/NCAA tournament champion
- 1979, 1982, 1983, 1987

AIAW/NCAA tournament runner-up
- 1974, 1975, 1977, 1988, 1996

AIAW/NCAA tournament semifinal
- 1974, 1975, 1976, 1977, 1978, 1979, 1980, 1982, 1983, 1987, 1988, 1996, 2000, 2002, 2003, 2009

AIAW/NCAA tournament appearance
- 1974, 1975, 1976, 1977, 1978, 1979, 1980, 1981, 1982, 1983, 1984, 1985, 1986, 1987, 1988, 1989, 1990, 1991, 1993, 1994, 1995, 1996, 1997, 1998, 1999, 2000, 2001, 2002, 2003, 2004, 2005, 2006, 2007, 2008, 2009, 2010, 2011, 2012, 2013, 2014, 2015, 2016, 2017, 2018, 2019, 2021, 2022, 2023, 2024

Conference tournament champion
- WAC; 1998, 2001, 2002, 2003, 2004, 2005, 2006, 2007, 2008, 2009, 2011; Big West; 2023, 2024

Conference regular season champion
- PCAA; 1987; WAC; 1996, 1997, 1998, 1999, 2000, 2001, 2002, 2003, 2004, 2005, 2006, 2007, 2008, 2009, 2010, 2011; Big West; 1988, 1989, 1990, 1995, 2012, 2013, 2015, 2016, 2019, 2021, 2022; Mountain West; 2026

The Hawaii Rainbow Wahine Volleyball Team is an NCAA Division I women's volleyball team for the University of Hawaiʻi at Mānoa. They are a member of the Mountain West Conference and are led by head coach Joshua Walker. The Rainbow Wahine volleyball program remains a significant source of financial income for the University of Hawai'i (UH) athletic department.

Working between the two governing bodies of the AIAW and NCAA, Joyce Kapuaala-Kaapuni started with Hawai'i in 1974, alongside USA Volleyball's (USAV) 1970 World's participant Beth McLachlin. She continued her UH college career in 1982-83, winning back-to-back national championships.

The team has won four national championships: one AIAW title and three NCAA Division I titles. The Rainbow Wahine played in the Big West Conference from 1988 to 1995. They joined the Western Athletic Conference (WAC) in 1996 and clinched at least a share of the regular-season conference title each year until 2012, when the Rainbow Wahine rejoined the Big West Conference. The UH won the WAC Tournament (and the WAC's automatic NCAA Tournament bid) in 1998 and every year between 2001 and 2011, except in 2010 when UH lost in the tournament's final round to the Utah State Aggies. All four national championship squads have been inducted into the UH Sports Circle of Honor.

In 1987, UH earned a third-place finish at the USAV Open Nationals in Berkeley, California. UH's Tita Ahuna, recognized as the consecutive all-tourney, had fallen to NorCal's Carlson Chrysler (1st place) and the American SW's Merrill Lynch (2nd).

Brigham Young University–Hawaii, which ceased its athletic programs in 2017, holds the distinction of being a ten-time National Champion, with its most recent title in NCAA Division II. It was also one of the few institutions in Hawaii to have defeated the University of Hawaii's Rainbow Wahine volleyball team, achieving this feat in 1992. Robyn Ah Mow-Santos, who would become the head coach at the University of Hawaii, played a key role in the team’s performance. Under her guidance, the team reached the NCAA Regional Final in Long Beach, California, in 1993.

On 21 October 1994, the Rainbow Wahine played their first match in the Stan Sheriff Center against the AVCA polled RV San Jose State Spartans. The Rainbow Wahine led the nation in home game attendance from 1995 to 2014, with a cumulative average of more than 6,800 fans per match, until the Nebraska Cornhuskers moved into the Bob Devaney Sports Center and began averaging over 8,000 fans at each home match.

The 1996 NCAA Division I women's volleyball tournament began with 48 teams (with a 12-team, six-match play-in meet), which ended on December 21, 1996, when Stanford defeated Hawaiʻi in the NCAA championship match. In the order of 3–0 sweeps, UH went over, routing Colorado, Texas, BYU, and Florida before succumbing 0–3, themselves, to the Cardinal. Retrospective of this current 2017–present, Wahine-now leaders are the Head Coach, the Assistant Coach, and the Director of Volleyball Operations; perhaps not coincidentally, they were the principled head women as athletes then.

Junior #2-Susie Boogaard (2002–2005), Iffy, informally, has the best season of her UH career. Averaging approximately 15 home matches per year, the parents of Boogaard purchased tickets for unlimited flights, on annual passes by ATA Airlines, out of Los Angeles into Honolulu. The Ahuna's (1984–1987), reflexive, went to Honolulu to the Continental U.S.

In 2006, former player Kari Anderson (1991–94) moved into the associate head coach's position; she'd been an Assistant Coach since 1996. She is still the longest-tenured right-handed aide in UH WVB history. She'd retired from volleyball in early 2011.

UH is 24–0 against UH Hilo in their state turf series, dating back to the mid-1970s. On September 12, 2009, the program notched its 1,000th victory with a 3–0 win over Stanford; this series favors UH 19–13. On December 11, 2015, the Wahine beat seven-time national champions Penn State 3–0. Rarefied, NU(s'), of the state consequently of Nebraska, archives presenting the 8-8 HI-NE tie makes for Hawaiian celebratory tenor; the Rainbow and Cornhuskers Wahine (beginning with 1975), they codify the winner's tradition(s).

On 1989 December 8, 1989, a number one ranked Rainbow Wahine, quite objectively, referenced through annals which show those (that) analyzed statistically (e.g. kills, digs, and percentages); they'd beat another AVCA Top 25 program in Cal Poly SLO, at Stockton, California, in the regional semifinal 15–9, 15–17, 9–15, 15–12, 15–12. Others via the official NCAA history might suggest that the longest game of 3 1/2 hours, between the #6 BYU Cougars and #7 UH, this manages ensured the best match chronicled with a UH win of 15–12, 21–19, 13–15, 16–18, 24–22. This latter-mentioned match occurred in the 1998 Las Vegas WAC Championships final. Of that 1998 postseason blossomed run into the NCAA Elite Eight, having incidentally been 1996 sophomore understudy to Coach Ah Mow at setter, Nikki (sept Ivarie's) Hubbert would appear and win the Family Feud game show versus the Couchois clan (2007). Senior-Hubbert holds the all-time UH record(s) for total assists and assists per set in a year: 1998.

== 2011 ==
Senior Leader: Kanani Danielson

Returning (as sophomores): Prepvolleyball.com's #10 '10 Class (Top 100's Hartong, Uiato, Goodman, Waber)

Early, September 1-4th, the Hawaiian Airlines Wahine Volleyball Classic featured four AVCA Top 25s (UCLA, The Ohio State University, Long Beach State, at Manoa). AVCA #21 Pepperdine came into Honolulu for back-to-back matches against the, timed, #11-ranked 'Bows two weeks later. The second September 17 game, preceding CBS's Hawaii Five-0 (2010 TV series, season 2) fifth episode airing 11 October, resulted in a second consecutive win for UH (twice 3–1). It was titled "Maʻemaʻe"/"Clean."

== 2012 Prime Scholastic Season ==
The particular match of the year was played on Saturday, September 15 at 00:00 CDT. The auspicious headline thereafter read: Rainbow Wahine Volleyball Tops Alumnae in Four Sets.

== Program record and history ==
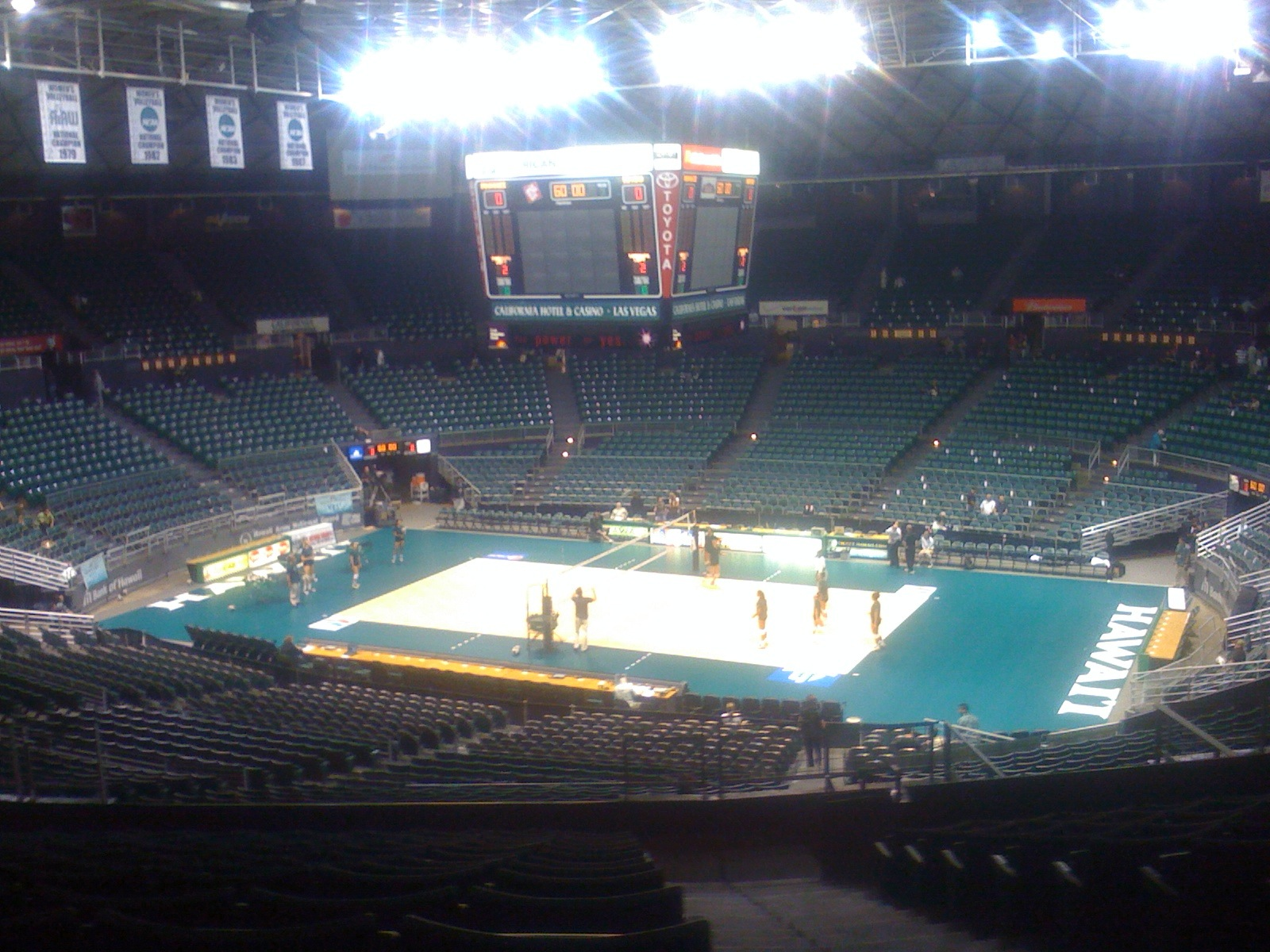
National championship banners hang in the rafters at the Stan Sheriff Center

| Year | Head Coach | Overall Record | Conference Record | Conference Standing | Postseason |
|---|---|---|---|---|---|
| 1974 | Alan Kang | 9–1 | | | AIAW Runners-Up |
| 1975 | Dave Shoji | 16–2 | | | AIAW Runners-Up |
| 1976 | Dave Shoji | 14–5 | | | AIAW 3rd Place |
| 1977 | Dave Shoji | 22–5 | | | AIAW Runners-Up |
| 1978 | Dave Shoji | 28–10–1 | | | AIAW 3rd Place |
| 1979 | Dave Shoji | 36–5 | | | AIAW Champions |
| 1980 | Dave Shoji | 34–10 | | | AIAW 3rd Place |
| 1981 | Dave Shoji | 37–2 | | | NCAA Regional Final |
| 1982 | Dave Shoji | 33–1 | | | NCAA Champions |
| 1983 | Dave Shoji | 34–2 | | | NCAA Champions |
| 1984 | Dave Shoji | 33–11 | | | NCAA First Round |
PCAA (1985–1987)
| 1985 | Dave Shoji | 28–13 | 10–6 | 3rd | NCAA Regional Semifinal |
| 1986 | Dave Shoji | 31–7 | 15–3 | 2nd | NCAA Regional Final |
| 1987 | Dave Shoji | 37–2 | 17–1 | 1st | NCAA Champions |
Big West (1988–1995)
| 1988 | Dave Shoji | 33–3 | 18–0 | 1st | NCAA Runners-Up |
| 1989 | Dave Shoji | 29–3 | 17–1 | 1st | NCAA Regional Final |
| 1990 | Dave Shoji | 28–6 | 16–2 | 1st | NCAA Regional Semifinal |
| 1991 | Dave Shoji | 26–5 | 15–3 | 2nd | NCAA Regional Final |
| 1992 | Dave Shoji | 15–12 | 11–7 | 4th | |
| 1993 | Dave Shoji | 19–11 | 13–5 | 3rd | NCAA Regional Final |
| 1994 | Dave Shoji | 25–5 | 15–3 | 2nd | NCAA Regional Semifinal |
| 1995 | Dave Shoji | 31–1 | 18–0 | 1st | NCAA Regional Final |
WAC (1996–2011)
| 1996 | Dave Shoji | 35–3 | 16–0 | 1st | NCAA Runners-Up |
| 1997 | Dave Shoji | 25–8 | 14–0 | 1st | NCAA First Round |
| 1998 | Dave Shoji | 32–3 | 13–1 | 1st | NCAA Regional Final |
| 1999 | Dave Shoji | 29–2 | 14–0 | 1st | NCAA Regional Semifinal |
| 2000 | Dave Shoji | 31–2 | 16–0 | 1st | NCAA Final Four |
| 2001 | Dave Shoji | 29–6 | 13–0 | 1st | NCAA Regional Semifinal |
| 2002 | Dave Shoji | 34–2 | 13–0 | 1st | NCAA Final Four |
| 2003 | Dave Shoji | 36–2 | 13–0 | 1st | NCAA Final Four |
| 2004 | Dave Shoji | 30–1 | 13–0 | 1st | NCAA Regional Semifinal |
| 2005 | Dave Shoji | 27–7 | 16–0 | 1st | NCAA Regional Semifinal |
| 2006 | Dave Shoji | 29–6 | 15–1 | 1st | NCAA Regional Final |
| 2007 | Dave Shoji | 27–6 | 15–1 | 1st | NCAA Second Round |
| 2008 | Dave Shoji | 31–4 | 15–1 | 1st | NCAA Regional Final |
| 2009 | Dave Shoji | 32–3 | 16–0 | 1st | NCAA Final Four |
| 2010 | Dave Shoji | 29–3 | 16–0 | 1st | NCAA Second Round |
| 2011 | Dave Shoji | 31–2 | 16–0 | 1st | NCAA Regional Semifinal |
Big West (2012–present)
| 2012 | Dave Shoji | 27–3 | 18–0 | 1st | NCAA Second Round |
| 2013 | Dave Shoji | 25–5 | 13–3 | 1st | NCAA Second Round |
| 2014 | Dave Shoji | 22–7 | 13–3 | 2nd | NCAA Second Round |
| 2015 | Dave Shoji | 29–2 | 16–0 | 1st | NCAA Regional Final |
| 2016 | Dave Shoji | 23–6 | 15–1 | 1st | NCAA Second Round |
| 2017 | Robyn Ah Mow | 20–8 | 14–2 | 2nd | NCAA First Round |
| 2018 | Robyn Ah Mow | 18–9 | 14–2 | 2nd | NCAA First Round |
| 2019 | Robyn Ah Mow | 26–4 | 14–2 | 1st | NCAA Regional Semifinal |
| 2020–21 | Robyn Ah Mow | Big West Conference season canceled | | | |
| 2021 | Robyn Ah Mow | 22–8 | 18–2 | 1st | NCAA Second Round |
| 2022 | Robyn Ah Mow | 22–7 | 19–1 | 1st | NCAA First Round |
| 2023 | Robyn Ah Mow | 24–9 | 14–4 | 2nd | NCAA Second Round |
| 2024 | Robyn Ah Mow | 21–10 | 13–5 | 2nd | NCAA First Round |
| 2025 | Robyn Ah Mow | 12–17 | 8–10 | T–6th | |
| Total | | 1,376–277–1 | 578–70 | | |

== Team facts ==
=== Head coach ===
- 1972–1974: Alan Kang
- 1975–2017: Dave Shoji
- 2017–2026: Robyn Ah Mow
- 2026-present: Joshua Walker

Robyn Ah Mow, a former player and assistant coach for the Rainbow Wahine, became the head coach in February of 2017, immediately upon the announcement of Dave Shoji's retirement. Dave Shoji was the head coach of the Rainbow Wahine Volleyball team from 1975 to 2017. As of 2013, he was the most winning Division I women's volleyball head coach. He is a member of the NCAA Volleyball Division 1 25th Anniversary Team. In addition, he has been named the National Coach of the Year by the American Volleyball Coaches Association twice—in 1982 and 2009. He was named Region Coach of the Year nine times, and the conference Coach of the Year eleven times. In 2010, he was inducted into the AVCA's Hall of Fame. He co-authored with Ann Miller, Wahine Volleyball: 40 Years of Coaching Hawaii's Team (2013).

=== League ===
- 1974–80: Association for Intercollegiate Athletics for Women (AIAW)
- 1981–present: NCAA Division I

=== Conference ===
- 1985–1995, 2012–2025: Pacific Coast Athletic Association (PCAA) / Big West Conference
- 1996–2011: Western Athletic Conference (WAC)
- 2011-2026: Big West Conference (BW)
- 2026–present: Mountain West Conference (MW)

=== Home court ===
- 1975–1994: Klum Gym/Neal Blaisdell Center
- 1988, 2012: War Memorial Stadium Complex (Wailuku, Maui)
- 1994–present: Stan Sheriff Center (SSC)

=== National championships ===
- 1979: AIAW by defeating Utah State, 8–15, 7–15, 15–9, 16–14, 15–12
- 1982: NCAA by defeating USC, 14–16, 9–15, 15–13, 15–10, 15–12
- 1983: NCAA by defeating UCLA, 15–13, 15–4, 15–10
- 1987: NCAA by defeating Stanford, 15–10, 15–10, 9–15, 15–1

== In film ==
The formation of the first Rainbow Wahine volleyball team is chronicled in the documentary film Rise of the Wahine, directed by Dean Kaneshiro. Rise features the struggles of these first teams after the passing of Title IX and highlights the roles of coaches Alan Kang and Dave Shoji, the first female Athletic Director Dr. Donnis Thompson, Patsy Mink, and players from the first teams, including Diana McInerny, Marilyn Moniz-Kaho`ohanonaho, Joyce Ka'apuni, and Joey Akeo.

== NCAA representation ==
A 25th Anniversary Team of NCAA Division I Women's Volleyball was released by the NCAA Press on November 1, 2005, for the media and public. The team featured 1983 Honda-Broderick Cup winner Middle Blocker Deitre Collins, who's a 2017 Inaugural SCIVBHOF Inductee, including Andy Banachowski, Laurel Brassey, Craig Buck, Tara Cross, Bob Ctvrtlik, Dusty Dvorak, Rolf Engen, Debbie Green, Kathy Gregory, Bryan Ivie, Karch Kiraly, Ricci Luyties, Chris Marlowe, Misty May, Kim Oden, Mike O’Hara, Doug Partie, Al Scates, Gene Selznick, Sinjin Smith, Jeff Stork, Steve Timmons, Paula Weishoff; Coach Dave Shoji being awarded as head coach, likewise, of seven total NCAA honorees. Tonya "Teee" Williams was named to the 1980s NCAA all-Decade team for accolades. Also, the NCAA no longer awards athletes with All-American recognition as they once did in the only year, 1981 (Wahine Diane Sabastian-Pestolesi).

== See also ==
- List of NCAA Division I women's volleyball programs
