= Alyssa D'Errico =

American volleyball player and coach

- D'Errico in 2008

Current position
- Title: Head coach
- Team: Utah
- Conference: Big 12
- Record: 0–0 (–)
- Annual salary: 210,000

Biographical details
- Born: March 28, 1989 (age 37); Brockport, New York, U.S.
- Education: Penn State

Playing career
- 2007–2010: Penn State
- 2011–2012: Feel Volley Alcobendas Club
- 2012–2013: ŽOK Split 1700
- 2013–2014: Istres Ouest Provence
- Position: Libero

Coaching career (HC unless noted)
- 2015–2016: Louisville (Assistant)
- 2017–2018: Dayton (Assistant)
- 2019–2022: Dayton (Assoc. HC)
- 2023–2025: Utah (Assoc. HC)
- 2026–present: Utah

Accomplishments and honors

Awards
- AVCA Thirty under 30 Award (2018)

Alyssa Lynn D'Errico (born March 28, 1989) is an American volleyball coach and former player. She was named the head coach of the Utah Utes women's volleyball program on December 8, 2025, after longtime coach Beth Launiere announced her retirement.

Before coaching, D'Errico played as a libero/defensive specialist for the Penn State Nittany Lions women's volleyball team from 2007 to 2010, helping guide the program to an NCAA-record four straight national championships during that time. She also won four Big Ten titles during her career.

== Personal life ==
D'Errico was born on March 28, 1989, in Brockport, New York. She played volleyball and basketball at Byron-Bergen High School where she was named a five-time Section V Class C Most Valuable Player (2002–2006). Beginning in her eighth grade year, she helped lead her high school team to three New York state titles (2004–2006) and five sectional titles. She was the 2006–2007 New York State Gatorade Player of the Year.

She described in a 2010 interview that as a high schooler, she would travel down to Penn State for club tournaments, camps, and volleyball matches and described Penn State as her “dream” school.

== Playing career ==
=== Penn State ===
D'Errico played as a libero/defensive specialist for the Penn State Nittany Lions women's volleyball team from 2007 to 2010. Known for her aggressive jump serve, D'Errico played in every match as a freshman and had a four-year career, helping Penn State to an NCAA-record four straight national championships in 2007, 2008, 2009, and 2010. D'Errico helped Penn State to an NCAA-record 109-match win streak, while also winning four Big Ten volleyball titles.

=== Professional ===
After graduation from Penn State, D'Errico played three years as a libero overseas on the professional circuit. Her professional career included stops in Spain, Croatia, and France. In 2011–2012, she played in Spain for Feel Volley Alcobendas Club; she was named the Most Valuable Player of the Princess Cup.

She then played in Croatia for ŽOK Split 1700 in the top league, as a libero, where she helped guide her team to the semifinals. Her final professional season landed her in the top French league (LNV) playing for the Istres Ouest Provence Volleyball club.

== Coaching career ==
=== Collegiate coaching career ===
D'Errico began her coaching career as an assistant coach for the Louisville from 2015 to 2016. She helped the Cardinals to their first ACC Championship shortly after her arrival. She then joined the Dayton coaching staff as an assistant in 2017 and was promoted to associate head coach by 2019. D'Errico specialized in the blocking and defensive efforts and was involved in all recruiting and program-wide decisions. She helped Dayton to two Atlantic 10 regular season conference championships in 2020 and 2021, as well as four consecutive conference tournament championships from 2018 to 2021. In 2018, D'Errico was recognized by the American Volleyball Coaches Association as a Thirty Under 30 coaching honoree.

D'Errico joined the Utah coaching staff in 2023. She helped guide the program to the 2024 and 2025 NCAA tournaments. She was named head coach of the program after longtime coach Beth Launiere's retirement.

=== U.S. National team ===
D'Errico was an assistant coach for the United States women's national volleyball team for the 2025 FIVB Volleyball Girls' U19 World Championship, helping coach the team to a silver medal.

== Head coaching record ==
Record table
Season	Team	Overall	Conference	Standing	Postseason
Utah (Big 12) (2026–present)
2026	Utah	0–0	0–0		
Utah:		0–0 (–)	0–0 (–)		
Total:		0–0 (–)			
