= Penn State Nittany Lions women's volleyball =

Women's volleyball team of Penn State University

- 2026 Penn State Nittany Lions women's volleyball team
- University: Pennsylvania State University
- Head coach: Katie Schumacher-Cawley (5th season)
- Conference: Big Ten
- Location: University Park, Pennsylvania, US
- Home arena: Rec Hall (capacity: 7,200)
- Nickname: Nittany Lions
- Colors: Blue and white

AIAW/NCAA tournament champion
- 1999, 2007, 2008, 2009, 2010, 2013, 2014, 2024

AIAW/NCAA tournament runner-up
- 1993, 1997, 1998

AIAW/NCAA tournament semifinal
- 1993, 1994, 1997, 1998, 1999, 2007, 2008, 2009, 2010, 2012, 2013, 2014, 2017, 2024

AIAW/NCAA Regional Final
- 1990, 1993, 1994, 1996, 1997, 1998, 1999, 2000, 2003, 2006, 2007, 2008, 2009, 2010, 2012, 2013, 2014, 2017, 2018, 2019, 2024

AIAW/NCAA regional semifinal
- 1981, 1983, 1984, 1986, 1990, 1991, 1992, 1993, 1994, 1995, 1996, 1997, 1998, 1999, 2000, 2003, 2004, 2005, 2006, 2007, 2008, 2009, 2010, 2011, 2012, 2013, 2014, 2015, 2016, 2017, 2018, 2019, 2020, 2022, 2023, 2024

AIAW/NCAA tournament appearance
- 1980, 1981, 1982, 1983, 1984, 1985, 1986, 1987, 1988, 1989, 1990, 1991, 1992, 1993, 1994, 1995, 1996, 1997, 1998, 1999, 2000, 2001, 2002, 2003, 2004, 2005, 2006, 2007, 2008, 2009, 2010, 2011, 2012, 2013, 2014, 2015, 2016, 2017, 2018, 2019, 2020, 2021, 2022, 2023, 2024, 2025

Conference regular season champion
- Atlantic 10; 1983*, 1984, 1985, 1986, 1987, 1988, 1989, 1990 * tournament (no regular season) Big Ten; 1992, 1993, 1996, 1997, 1998, 1999, 2003, 2004, 2005, 2006, 2007, 2008, 2009, 2010, 2012, 2013, 2017, 2024

The Penn State Nittany Lions women's volleyball program has had a long tradition, they were founded in 1976 by Tom Tait, long-time coach of the Penn State men's team, who coached the women's team from 1976 to 1979 and was named a USA Volleyball All-Time great coach in 2007.

Russ Rose was the head coach for the program from 1979 to 2021. He led the program to seven NCAA national championships, first in 1999, then in each year from 2007 through 2010, and in both 2013 and 2014. Rose has led the Nittany Lions to appearances in every NCAA Division I women's volleyball tournament, making Penn State the only program in the nation to appear in every NCAA volleyball tournament since its inception in 1981. Rose is the nation's all-time leader in wins, winning percentage and NCAA tournament winning percentage.

Prior to entering the Big Ten Conference in 1991, Penn State experienced unprecedented success in the Atlantic 10 Conference, winning eight straight championships, never losing a conference match in that time.

== Notable seasons ==
=== Russ Rose era ===
==== 1990 ====
In 1990, Penn State entered the NCAA tournament undefeated with a 42–0 record. The Nittany Lions swept Purdue and Big Ten champion Wisconsin in the first two rounds of the NCAA tournament, before losing to Nebraska in the NCAA Regional Final. Of the team's 44 wins, 40 were sweeps, a school and national record.

Penn State finished sixth in the final 1990 Tachikara Coaches Poll, the program's highest final ranking ever at the time. In addition, Rose earned his first AVCA National Coach of the Year honor.

==== 1993 ====
In 1993, the Nittany Lions surged into their third year of Big Ten play and won their second consecutive conference title. At the NCAA tournament, the team strung together four victories and earned the right to play for the National Championship against Long Beach State.

==== 1994 ====
In 1994, Rose coached the Nittany Lions to a second straight NCAA national semifinal appearance and picked up his 500th career win early in the season. Placing second in the Big Ten with a 17–3 conference mark, the Nittany Lions posted a 31–4 ledger on the year and ended the regular-season ranked No. 5, at the time their highest regular-season finish ever. Season highlights included beating eventual national runner-up and perennial powerhouse UCLA at the Volleyball Monthly Invitational and No. 1-ranked and undefeated Nebraska in Lincoln at the NCAA Mideast Regional final to advance to their second straight national semifinal.

==== 1997 ====
In 1997, Rose's Nittany Lions finished as runners-up to Stanford in the NCAA national championship game after defeating Florida, 3–0, in the semifinals. Penn State, favored to win, made their third Final Four appearance in five years. Terri Zemaitis was named the NCAA championship MVP.

==== 1998 ====
After posting a runner-up finish in 1997, the Lions made it back to the NCAA Championship match in 1998. The team cruised through the regular season with a 30–0 mark, with 28 of those coming in three sets. Penn State also became only the second school to close out the Big Ten schedule with a perfect 20–0 mark.

After winning its fifth Big Ten title, Penn State hosted the NCAA First and Second rounds and the Central Regional. They swept past Bucknell, Clemson, Louisville and Brigham Young to earn a spot in the school's fourth national semifinal. Once they reached the NCAA Final Four in Madison, Wisconsin, the season ended much like 1997. Penn State defeated Nebraska, 3–1, to advance to the national championship match. And once again, the Lions had to rally from a 0–2 deficit to force a fifth game, only to come up short against Long Beach State for the NCAA title. Despite losing, Cacciamani was named co-MVP for the tournament.

==== 1999 ====
Rose led Penn State to the program's first NCAA national championship (their third consecutive appearance in the NCAA title match) and their second-consecutive 20–0 record in Big Ten play (and fourth straight conference title), becoming the first team in conference history to pull off the feat. In the national semifinals, they defeated Pacific, 3–2, and in the finals they defeated Stanford, 3–0, with scores of 15–2, 15–10, 15–7, marking the first time all season that Stanford had been swept. Lauren Cacciamani was named the championship MVP for the second consecutive year. Bonnie Bremner and Cacciamani were also named first team All-Americans. Bremner became Penn State's first ever four-time All-American. Cacciamani was named the AVCA National Player of the Year, Big Ten Player of the Year, Big Ten Female Athlete of the Year and the Honda Award winner for volleyball.

In addition, the 1999 Nittany Lions extended their NCAA record home-match winning streak to 80 straight (extended to 87 in 2000), eclipsing the previous standard of 58 set by Florida from 1990 to 1994. The Lions streak was finally put to a halt at 87 matches with a loss to Minnesota on Sept. 29, 2000. Penn State had last dropped a match at Rec Hall on Nov. 24, 1994, when they suffered a 3–2 setback to Illinois, a span of over five seasons. The 87 home-match winning streak was only outranked by the basketball trio of Kentucky, 1943–55 (129); St. Bonaventure, 1948–61 (99) and UCLA, 1970–76 (98). Russ Rose earned his 700th career victory on September 15, 2000, in a sweep of West Virginia.

==== 2005 ====
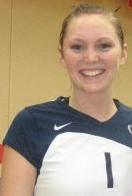
Nicole Fawcett, the 2005 AVCA National Freshman of the Year

In 2005, the Nittany Lions claimed their third consecutive Big Ten title with an unblemished 20–0 league record, the sixth time since 1985 that the champion had been perfect, but were upset in the NCAA tournament regional semi-final on their home court. Penn State also picked up the program's first ever AVCA National Freshman of the Year honors, for outside hitter Nicole Fawcett. Fawcett was also named Big Ten Freshman of the Year, Penn State's fourth consecutive. Senior Kaleena Walters was named Penn State's first ever Big Ten Defensive Player of the Year, and senior Sam Tortorello was named the unanimous Big Ten Player of the Year. Tortorello was also named a first-team All-American and a Honda Award nominee, while Fawcett and sophomore Melissa Walbridge were named second-team All-Americans. Walters and freshman Christa Harmotto were both named to the AVCA Honorable Mention All-America team.

In addition to dropping only three individual games during the conference season, Penn State swept all four major honors, becoming the first school to sweep the honors in the 22 years of Big Ten women's volleyball to that point. Rose also earned his seventh Big Ten Coach of the Year award. The main starting line-up for the season consisted of two seniors, a junior, a sophomore and two freshmen.

==== 2006 ====
In 2006, the Nittany Lions started out the season 21–0, before finishing with a 32–3 record and an appearance in the NCAA Regional Final. The 2006 squad captured Penn State's fourth consecutive outright Big Ten championship, tying the Big Ten record of four straight, set by Penn State from 1996 to 1999.

Freshman Megan Hodge made history as the first freshman to be named Big Ten Player of the Year in the 23-year history of the award to that point. Hodge also was named Penn State's second ever and second consecutive AVCA National Freshman of the Year, thus making Penn State the first school to win the award back-to-back. Hodge became the first ever volleyball player to win Gatorade National Player of the Year honors as a high school senior and then AVCA National Freshman of the Year honors in college. The Number 1 high school recruit also earned first team All-America honors, becoming only the third true freshman in seven years to be named to the first team. Sophomore Nicole Fawcett also picked up first team All-America honors, while sophomore Christa Harmotto earned her place on the second team. Rose earned his eighth Big Ten Coach of the Year award.

==== 2007 ====
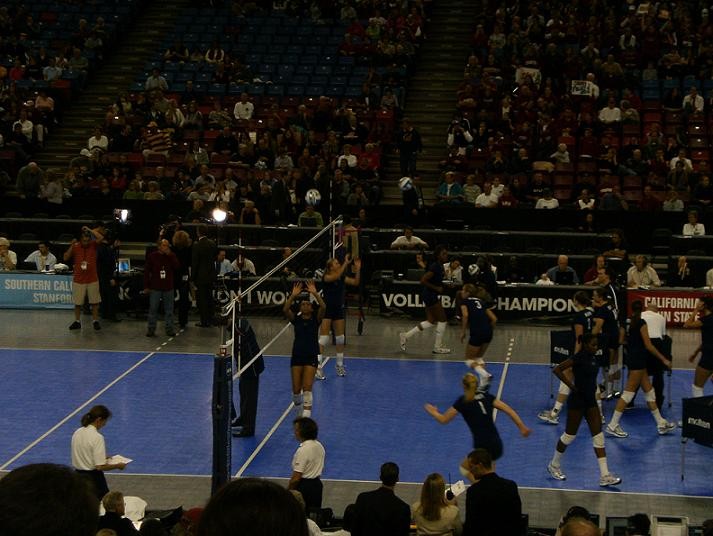
Penn State practicing before the 2007 NCAA championship against Stanford in Sacramento, California at the ARCO Arena

Penn State won its second NCAA national championship in 2007, as well as the program's fifth consecutive outright Big Ten championship. The team finished with a 20–0 Big Ten record, the second time in the last three seasons the team accomplished the feat – and finished the season off with a 34–2 overall record. On October 29, Penn State got its first Number 1 ranking since winning the NCAA title in 1999 and became the first Big Ten school since 2004 to hold the top ranking.

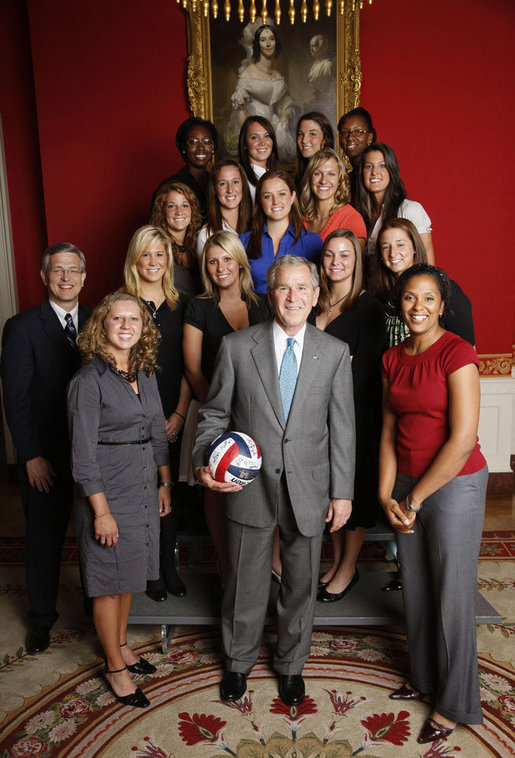
The Nittany Lions are honored at the White House by President of the United States George W. Bush in June 2008 for their winning the 2007 National Collegiate Athletic Association Division I championship.

In Big Ten awards, the program picked up three of four major honors, with junior Christa Harmotto taking Player of the Year, Arielle Wilson taking Freshman of the Year, and Rose taking Coach of the Year. Harmotto, sophomore Megan Hodge, and junior Nicole Fawcett picked up first-team AVCA All-America honors, while sophomore setter Alisha Glass picked up second-team All-America honors.

In the 2007 NCAA Tournament, the team swept Siena, Albany, Michigan, BYU and California leading into the final. Penn State, the third overall seed in the tournament, defeated Stanford, the first overall seed in the tournament, in the NCAA national championship match that took place on December 15, 2007, at ARCO Arena in Sacramento, California. After winning the first two sets, Stanford rallied to push the match to a decisive fifth set, which Penn State won, 15–8. With the win, the Nittany Lions avenged an earlier season loss to Stanford exactly three months before on September 15.

Penn State set two NCAA tournament records and achieved other milestones during the 2007 NCAA tournament:

• Megan Hodge was named the championship MVP, the program's fourth all-time. Glass, Fawcett and Harmotto also earned spots on the seven-player Final Four All-Tournament team.
• Penn State shattered the NCAA tournament record of .369 for hitting percentage, set by Long Beach State in 1995. PSU hit .424 in six matches.
• Penn State tied the NCAA record for service aces in an NCAA Tournament with 43 in six matches, equaling the 1998 Long Beach State team that defeated Penn State for the national title.
• Penn State set a school record for hitting percentage in a single match versus Albany in the second round (.602).

Russ Rose achieved several top honors, as he was named the AVCA Division I National Coach-of-the-Year, was inducted into the AVCA Hall of Fame, and coached his team to the national championship, all within the same week. His national Coach-of-the-Year honor made him the first Division I coach to win the award three times.

==== 2008 ====
The 2008 team successfully defended their 2007 National College Athletic Association title, while also setting impressive NCAA records. Media coverage considered whether the 2008 Penn State women's volleyball team was perhaps the best team in NCAA history.

The Nittany Lions achieved what no other NCAA Division I, II, or III volleyball program could do – win every individual set of the regular season. Penn State also broke the NCAA record for consecutive matches won (52) with a sweep of Illinois, a mark that was previously held by USC. The 2008 team also broke the NCAA record for consecutive sets won, besting the previous recordholder, Florida, who had 105. The team won 111 straight sets up until the NCAA national semifinals. Penn State set a new rally era record (2001–present) for hitting percentage, finishing the season with a mark of .390, breaking the old mark of .369 set by Florida A&M. That was also the second-highest percentage of all-time for any era.

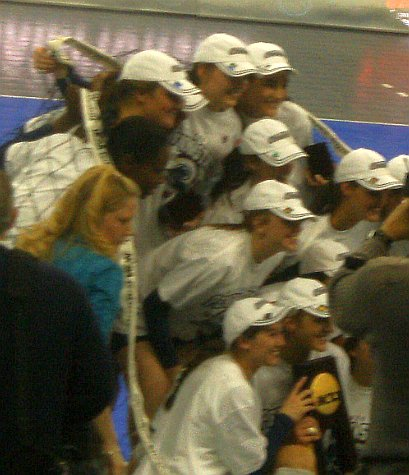
The Penn State volleyball team poses with the 2008 NCAA championship trophy after defeating Stanford University in the final.

In Big Ten awards, Penn State placed Nicole Fawcett, Christa Harmotto, Arielle Wilson, Megan Hodge and Alisha Glass on the First Team All-Big Ten, while senior libero Roberta Holehouse earned her place on the Honorable Mention. Fawcett ended her Big Ten play being named unanimous First Team all four years, Big Ten Player-of-the-Week eight times (tying for second most all-time in the conference), the Big Ten Freshman of the Year in 2005 and the Big Ten Player of the Year in 2008.

In addition to having the Big Ten Player of the Year, Penn State's fourth straight honor in that category, Russ Rose was named the Big Ten Coach of the Year by the coaches and media, the tenth such honor in his career.

A school record six players were placed on the AVCA All-Mideast Region team, with Fawcett, Harmotto, Wilson, Hodge, Glass and Blair Brown being recognized, more than any other program in the nation. Fawcett, Harmotto, Hodge and Glass then earned AVCA First Team All-America honors while Brown and Wilson earned second team honors. Six All-America honors on one team was an AVCA record.

Russ Rose repeated as the AVCA Division I National Coach of the Year, the first time a coach ever repeated the award. It was also the fourth time Rose claimed the top honors – more than any other coach in history. In addition, Fawcett was named the AVCA Division I National Player of the Year, which was Penn State's second ever, as Lauren Cacciamani earned the top award in 1999.

In the 2008 NCAA Tournament, Penn State earned the overall No. 1 seed. They swept Long Island, Yale, Western Michigan and California to advance to the NCAA Final Four, held at the Qwest Center in Omaha, Nebraska. In the national semifinals, they defeated Nebraska, 3–2, in front of an NCAA record 17,430 fans. Nebraska was the only team in 2008 that won a set or more against Penn State. Nebraska's loss was their first loss in the state of Nebraska in 96 matches. In the NCAA national championship match, the Nittany Lions faced Stanford for the second straight year. It was the first time in NCAA history that the same two teams played each other in the NCAA championship in consecutive years. In the rematch, Penn State swept the Cardinal, 3–0, to win their second straight NCAA championship. The match was played in front of 14,299 fans, the third-highest attendance in NCAA history. Hodge was named the Most Outstanding Player for the national championship match for the second straight year. The team joined the 2003 USC team as the only repeat champions to go undefeated, finishing the season with a 38–0 record and a 114–2 record in individual sets. They also joined 2003 USC and 2006 Nebraska as the only teams to go wire-to-wire ranked No. 1 in the coaches poll.

==== 2009 ====
Penn State captured its seventh consecutive and 13th overall Big Ten title after completing the regular season 32–0 (20–0 in the Big Ten) and going 96–5 in sets played. Penn State was led by seniors Megan Hodge and Alisha Glass, as well as juniors Blair Brown and Arielle Wilson.

The Nittany Lions did not lose a set in the NCAA tournament until the national semifinals against Hawaii Rainbow Wahine but won that match, 3–1, to set up a showdown against the No. 2 Texas Longhorns. The match against Hawaii was Coach Rose's 1,000 career win, making him the fifth person to reach that mark, reaching the win by beating another member of the 1,000 Win Club, Hawaii's coach Dave Shoji, who achieved the milestone earlier that season on October 17. In the championship match, Texas grabbed a 2–0 set lead. During its winning streak, Penn State had never been down 0–2. Despite Tournament MVP Destinee Hooker's NCAA finals record 34 kills against Penn State, the Lions clawed their way back and won the match, 3–2. Penn State extended its win streak to 102 games with another perfect season, winning a record third consecutive championship. The team finished 38–0 for the second straight year, going 114–8 in set play, with a two-year record of 76–0 and 228–10 in set play.

==== 2010 ====
In 2010 Penn State won its first seven matches, before having its record win streak snapped at 109 in a match against Stanford on September 11. They went 16–4 in Big Ten play and claimed their eighth consecutive Big Ten Conference championship (14th overall), matching the streak of eight consecutive Atlantic 10 Championships set during all eight years in that conference. Even though they dropped five matches, they won all 20 home matches (including postseason), extending their Rec Hall winning streak to 94 games, an NCAA record for consecutive home wins. This streak ended the following season on August 26, 2011, when the Nittany Lions dropped a 3–1 match to the Oregon Ducks.

The Nittany Lions posted a regular season record of 26–5 and earned the fourth overall seed in the NCAA tournament, keeping alive their streak of appearing in all 30 NCAA Tournaments. The team swept Niagara, Virginia Tech and Oklahoma in the first three rounds and defeated Duke, 3–1, in the Regional Final, advancing to their eighth Final Four. Penn State was the highest seed to advance to the Final Four, as the top three seeds were defeated in earlier rounds. In the national semifinals, the Nittany Lions faced the Texas Longhorns in a rematch of the 2009 NCAA National Championship. The team swept the Longhorns and advanced to their seventh championship match. In the finals the Nittany Lions faced the California Golden Bears, marking the fourth consecutive year Penn State faced Cal in the NCAA Tournament. Penn State won the match, claiming its record fourth consecutive national championship and fifth overall, with a final record of 32–5. The Nittany Lions had to that point won 24 consecutive postseason games, another NCAA record. The standout 6'1" freshman Deja McClendon was named the MVP of the game, and Cal's Carly Lloyd was named NCAA Division I Women's Volleyball Player-of-the-Year. The championship was Coach Russ Rose's fifth, the record for a single coach in NCAA history. Seniors Arielle Wilson, Blair Brown, and Alyssa D'Errico all graduated with four national championships, the only class in NCAA history to achieve that feat. Wilson and Brown trained with the United States national team in the summer, seeking roster spots for Team USA.

==== 2013 ====
In its thirty-third consecutive appearance in the NCAA tournament, Penn State returned to the podium by winning its sixth national championship and fifth in the previous seven years. The mark tied Stanford for most NCAA Division I national titles and continued one of the greatest dynasties in college volleyball history. The road to the championship included a 25-game win streak and tournament wins over Michigan State in the regional semi-final, perennial powerhouse Stanford in the regional final, Pac-12 champion Washington Huskies in the national semi-final, and University of Wisconsin in the finals. In both the Stanford and Wisconsin matches, the Lions faced significant deficits (trailing 9–6 in the fifth set against Stanford and 23–20 in the fourth set against Wisconsin), but were able to overcome both, largely propelled by the service game of their junior setter, Micha Hancock, who was named Most Outstanding Player of the tournament. The Lions also received significant contributions from All American seniors Deja McClendon, Ariel Scott and Katie Slay, each of whom book-ended their Penn State careers with national titles and were named to the NCAA All-Tournament Team.

During the regular season, Penn State boasted a record of 28–2, only losing in five sets to University of Texas (who would later claim the number one seed in the NCAA tournament but would lose to runner-up Wisconsin in the national semi-finals) and Michigan State (Penn State's only conference loss). Twenty of Penn State's twenty-eight wins were by shutout. The record was sufficient to secure Penn State its sixteenth Big Ten championship (in twenty-three years) and Coach Russ Rose the AVCA Coach of the Year Award, his fifth time receiving the award.

==== 2014 ====
In 2014 Penn State claimed its record seventh NCAA national championship and sixth in the last eight years, continuing one of the greatest dynasties in college sports. Anchored by its First Team All American senior setter and AVCA National Player of the Year, Micha Hancock, First Team All American senior middle hitter Nia Grant and senior libero Dominique Gonzalez, the Nittany Lions ended the 2014 season winning twenty straight matches, seventeen of which, including the championship match against Brigham Young University (BYU), were by shutout.

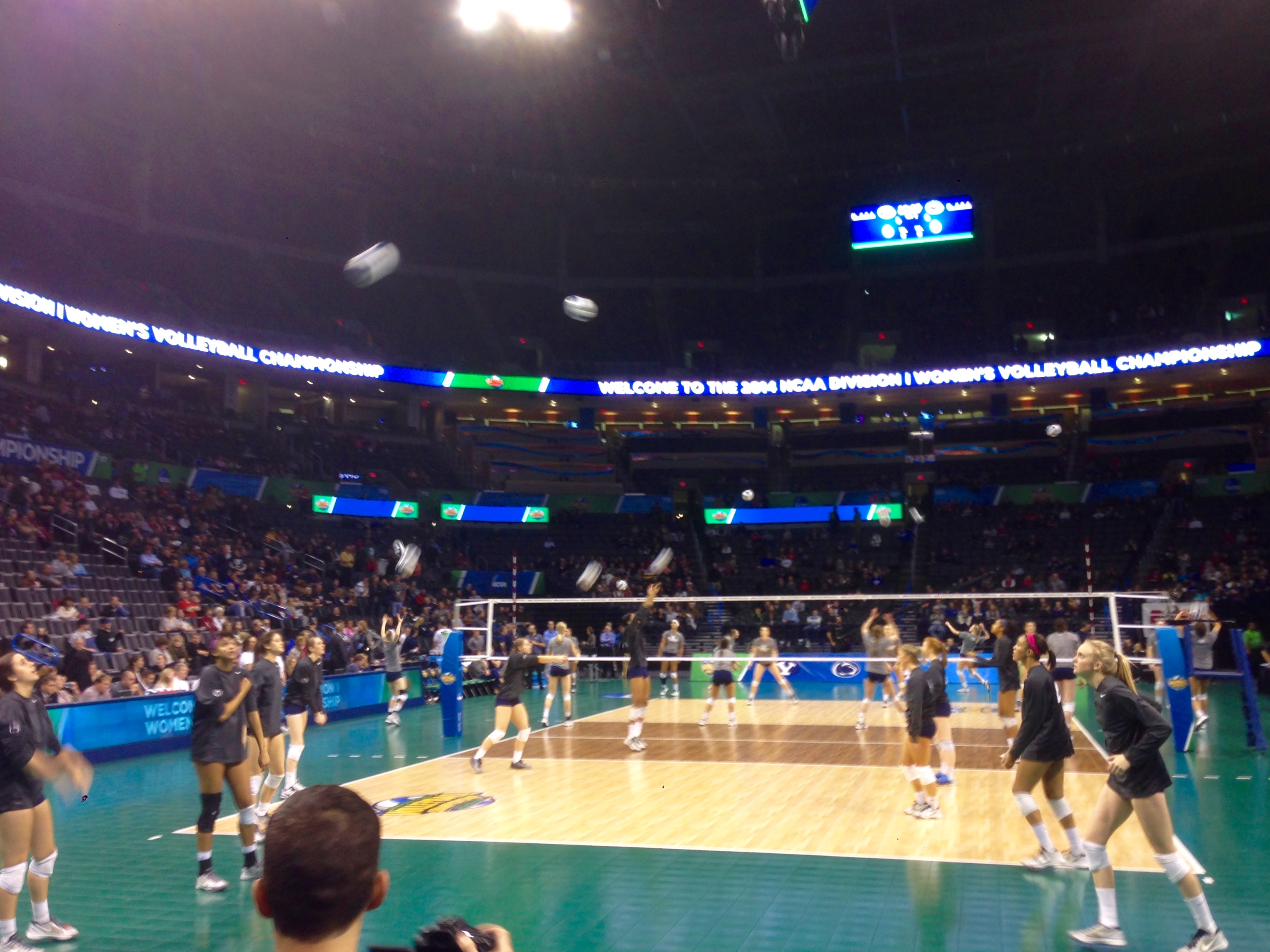
Penn State warming up before the 2014 NCAA championship against BYU in Oklahoma City, Oklahoma in Chesapeake Energy Arena

In addition to beating BYU in the finals, Penn State's path to the championship included straight set victories over Siena, Dayton and number 12 seed UCLA, and 3–1 wins over Big Ten champion and number 4 seed Wisconsin and the tournament number 1 seed, Stanford. Junior outside hitter Megan Courtney was named the tournament's Most Outstanding Player, hitting a match high 23 kills on .321 hitting and 16 digs in the Stanford match and 11 kills on .269 hitting, 14 digs and 5 blocks against BYU. Courtney single-handedly out-blocked the number 1 and number 2 blockers in the NCAA (Whitney Young and Amy Boswell) in the finals.

In what was seen as a rebuilding year, given the departures of All Americans Deja McClendon, Katie Slay and Ariel Scott, Penn State's success and 36–3 overall record was largely attributed to the performance of its highly touted freshmen, Ali Frantti (AVCA National Freshman of the Year and AVCA Second Team All American), who led the team with 391 kills, Haleigh Washington (Big Ten Freshman of the Year), who paced the team with a .463 hitting percentage, and Simone Lee, who had 135 kills and contributed significantly in Penn State's wins over Wisconsin during the regular season and the NCAA tournament. Aiyana Whitney, the junior outside hitter and AVCA Second Team All American, was also a pivotal piece of Penn State's championship team – accumulating 372 kills on .353 hitting. With Grant, Frantti, Whitney, Washington, Courtney and Lee, Penn State had one of the most balanced attacks in the nation and led the NCAA in hitting.

In addition to being named the AVCA National Player of the Year in 2014, Micha Hancock ended her storied Penn State career with 3 AVCA First Team All American honors, two Big Ten Setter of the Year awards (2012, 2013), the Big Ten Freshman of the Year award (2011), and as the NCAA tournament's Most Outstanding Player (2013). She leaves Penn State atop both the school's and the Big Ten's record books in career service aces and as the NCAA's all-time leader for aces in a single-season during the rally-scoring era (126).

=== Katie Schumacher-Cawley era ===
==== 2024 ====
In 2024, Schumacher-Cawley led the team to its best season in seven years, going 29–2 in regular season play and won a share of the Big Ten title after defeating Nebraska in its final conference match. It was the program's 18th Big Ten title overall, and first since 2017. She was named Big Ten Coach of the Year for her efforts. She also coached several players who were recognized with conference awards: Izzy Starck (Freshman of the Year, First Team All-Big Ten, All-Freshman Team), Jess Mruzik (Unanimous First Team All-Big Ten), Camryn Hannah (First Team), Taylor Trammel (First Team), Gillian Grimes (Second Team), Caroline Jurevicius (All-Freshman Team), and Ava Falduto (Sportsmanship Award).

Penn State returned to the NCAA national championship, after defeating Delaware State, North Carolina, Marquette, Creighton, and Nebraska. It was the program's 11th championship appearance in program history, and first since its win in 2014. Penn State won the NCAA national championship, defeating Louisville 3–1 in the championship match.

== Notable players ==
- Salima Rockwell (1991–1994) – member of the US national team, current head volleyball coach at Notre Dame, 2013 AVCA Division I National Assistant Coach of the Year (at Texas)
- Terri Zemaitis (1994–1997) – member of the US national team, 1995 Big Ten Player of the Year, 1997 NCAA Tournament Most Outstanding Player
- Lauren Cacciamani (1996–1999) – 1999 AVCA National Player of the Year, Big Ten Female Athlete of the Year, 1999 NCAA champion
- Katie Schumacher-Cawley (1998–2001) – current head coach of Penn State women's volleyball, played volleyball and basketball at Penn State, 2 time AVCA All American, 1999 NCAA champion
- Nicole Fawcett (2005–2008) – 2008 AVCA National Player of the Year, 2007 & 2008 NCAA champion, 2014 World Championship gold medalist, 2012 & 2016 Summer Olympics alternate
- Christa Harmotto (2005–2008) – 2012 Summer Olympics silver medalist, 2016 Summer Olympics bronze medalist, 2007 & 2008 NCAA champion
- Megan Hodge (2006–2009) – 2012 Summer Olympics silver medalist, 2016 Summer Olympics alternate, 2009 AVCA National Player of the Year, 2007, 2008, & 2009 NCAA champion
- Alisha Glass (2006–2009) – 2016 Summer Olympics bronze medalist, "Best Setter" award at the 2016 Summer Olympics, 2012 Summer Olympics alternate, 2007, 2008, 2009 NCAA champion
- Blair Brown (2007–2010) – 2011 Honda Sports Award winner, 2010 Big Ten Player of the Year, 2007, 2008, 2009 and 2010 NCAA champion
- Alyssa D'Errico (2007–2010) - 2007, 2008, 2009 and 2010 NCAA Champion, played professionally overseas, current head coach of Utah
- Arielle Wilson (2007–2010) - 2007 Big 10 Freshman of the Year, 3 time AVCA All American, 2007, 2008, 2009, 2010 NCAA champion
- Deja McClendon (2010–2013) - 2010 AVCA National Freshman of the Year, 4-time AVCA All American, 2010 & 2013 NCAA champion
- Ariel Scott (2010–2013) - 2012 Big Ten Player of the Year, 2010 & 2013 NCAA champion
- Micha Hancock (2011–2014) – 2020 Summer Olympics gold medalist, 2014 AVCA National Player of the Year, 2013 & 2014 NCAA champion
- Megan Courtney (2012–2015) – 2012 Big Ten Freshman of the Year, Italian Series A1 Pro player, 2020 Summer Olympics alternate, 2013 & 2014 NCAA champion
- Ali Frantti (2014–2017) – 2014 AVCA National Freshman of the Year, 2014 NCAA champion, Italian Series A1 Pro player
- Simone Lee (2014–2017) – member of the US national team, played professionally in Turkey, Italy, Germany and Japan, 2014 NCAA champion
- Nia Reed (2014–2018) – member of the US national team, 2014 NCAA champion, played professionally in Turkey, Brazil, France and South Korea
- Haleigh Washington (2014–2017) – 2020 Summer Olympics gold medalist, 2014 Big Ten Freshman of the Year, 2017 Big Ten Defensive Player of the Year, "Best Middle Blocker" award at the 2020 Summer Olympics, 2014 NCAA champion
- Jess Mruzik (2023–2024) – 2024 First Team All-American, 2024 NCAA Tournament MVP, 2024 NCAA champion

== Program record and history ==
On November 1, 2008, with a sweep of Iowa, the program reached 1,000 wins, becoming just the sixth NCAA Division I women's volleyball program to reach the milestone.

The program is the only Division I school to make every single NCAA tournament appearance (1981–2025).

Record table
Season	Team	Overall	Conference	Standing	Postseason
Tom Tait () (1976–1978)
1976	Tom Tait	6–11–3			
1977	Tom Tait	25-18			EAIAW Participant
1978	Tom Tait	20–14–1			EAIAW Participant
Tom Tait:		51–43–4 (.541)			
Russ Rose () (1979–2021)
1979	Russ Rose	32-9			EAIAW Participant
1980	Russ Rose	34-11			EAIAW & AIAW Participant
1981	Russ Rose	44-5			NCAA regional semifinal
1982	Russ Rose	26-15			NCAA first round
Atlantic 10 (1983-1990)
1983	Russ Rose	36-10	(Note: No regular season competition)	1st	NCAA regional semifinal
1984	Russ Rose	30-6	5-0	1st	NCAA regional semifinal
1985	Russ Rose	31-5	5-0	1st	NCAA first round
1986	Russ Rose	38-5	7-0	1st	NCAA regional semifinal
1987	Russ Rose	27-9	8-0	1st	NCAA first round
1988	Russ Rose	36-4	8-0	1st	NCAA first round
1989	Russ Rose	34-7	8-0	1st	NCAA first round
1990	Russ Rose	44-1	8-0	1st	NCAA Regional Final
Big Ten (1991–Present)
1991	Russ Rose	26-6	15-5	2nd	NCAA regional semifinal
1992	Russ Rose	28-4	19-1	T-1st	NCAA regional semifinal
1993	Russ Rose	31-5	18-2	1st	NCAA runner-up
1994	Russ Rose	31-4	17-3	2nd	NCAA Final Four
1995	Russ Rose	27-8	14-6	3rd	NCAA regional semifinal
1996	Russ Rose	31-3	18-2	T-1st	NCAA Regional Final
1997	Russ Rose	34-2	19-1	T-1st	NCAA runner-up
1998	Russ Rose	35–1	20–0	1st	NCAA runner-up
1999	Russ Rose	36–1	20–0	1st	NCAA Champions
2000	Russ Rose	30–6	16–4	3rd	NCAA Regional Final
2001	Russ Rose	22–8	14–6	3rd	NCAA second round
2002	Russ Rose	25–8	14–6	2nd	NCAA second round
2003	Russ Rose	31–5	17–3	1st	NCAA Regional Final
2004	Russ Rose	29–3	18–2	1st	NCAA regional semifinal
2005	Russ Rose	31–3	20–0	1st	NCAA regional semifinal
2006	Russ Rose	32–3	18–2	1st	NCAA Regional Final
2007	Russ Rose	34–2	20–0	1st	NCAA Champions
2008	Russ Rose	38–0	20–0	1st	NCAA Champions
2009	Russ Rose	38–0	20–0	1st	NCAA Champions
2010	Russ Rose	32–5	16–4	1st	NCAA Champions
2011	Russ Rose	25–8	16–4	2nd	NCAA regional semifinal
2012	Russ Rose	33–3	19–1	1st	NCAA Final Four
2013	Russ Rose	34–2	19–1	1st	NCAA Champions
2014	Russ Rose	36–3	18–2	2nd	NCAA Champions
2015	Russ Rose	28–6	15–5	4th	NCAA regional semifinal
2016	Russ Rose	24–10	14–6	4th	NCAA regional semifinal
2017	Russ Rose	33–2	19–1	T-1st	NCAA Final Four
2018	Russ Rose	25–7	14–6	4th	NCAA Regional Final
2019	Russ Rose	27–6	17–3	T–2nd	NCAA Regional Final
2020	Russ Rose	10–6	9–5	6th	NCAA regional semifinal
2021	Russ Rose	21–11	13–7	6th	NCAA second round
Russ Rose:		1330–229 (.853)	575–88 (.867)		
Katie Schumacher-Cawley (Big Ten) (2022–present)
2022	Katie Schumacher-Cawley	26–8	13–7	5th	NCAA Regional Semifinal
2023	Katie Schumacher-Cawley	23–9	15–5	T–3rd	NCAA Regional Semifinal
2024	Katie Schumacher-Cawley	35–2	19–1	T–1st	NCAA Champions
2025	Katie Schumacher-Cawley	19–13	12–8	T–6th	NCAA Second Round
Katie Schumacher-Cawley:		103–32 (.763)	59–21 (.738)		
Total:		1484–304–4 (.829)			
National champion Postseason invitational champion Conference regular season champion Conference regular season and conference tournament champion Division regular season champion Division regular season and conference tournament champion Conference tournament champion

== NCAA Records ==
Source: NCAA Division I Women's Volleyball Records

=== Individual ===
- Hitting Percentage (season)
  - .540 (337-36/557): Arielle Wilson, 2009
- Hitting Percentage (single NCAA Tournament match)
  - .889 (16-0/18): Nicole Fawcett, 2005
- Service Aces (season)
  - 126: Micha Hancock, 2014
- Service Aces (NCAA Tournament)
  - 22: Micha Hancock, 2012

=== Team ===
- Winning Percentage (NCAA all-time)
  - .871 (1,123–166), 1981–2015 (NCAA only)
- Winning Percentage (season) – tied
  - 1.000: 2008
  - 1.000: 2009
- Consecutive NCAA Winning Seasons – tied
  - 35: 1981–2015 ^{†}
- Consecutive NCAA Non-losing Seasons – tied
  - 35: 1981–2015 ^{†}
- Consecutive Matches Won
  - 109: Sept. 21, 2007-Sept. 10, 2010
- Consecutive Sets Won
  - 111: Dec. 15, 2007-Dec. 18, 2008
- Consecutive Home-Court Matches Won
  - 94: Sept. 1, 2006-Dec. 11, 2010
- Consecutive Road Matches Won
  - 55: Sept. 28, 2007-Sept. 10, 2010
- Hitting Percentage (NCAA Tournament)
  - .424 (335-72/621): 2007
- Service Aces (NCAA Tournament) – tied
  - 43: 2007

†The four preceding AIAW seasons were also winning years, although the combination of NCAA and AIAW seasons does not constitute an all-time record.

=== Coaching ===
- Winning Percentage (all-time)
  - .863 (1,246–198): Russ Rose, 1979–2017
- Victories (all-time)
  - 1,246: Russ Rose, 1979–2017

== Honors & award history ==
=== Atlantic 10 Awards ===
- Atlantic 10 Player of the Year
  - Lori Barberich: 1983 & 1984
  - Marcia Leap: 1985
  - Ellen Hensler: 1986
  - Lisa Leap: 1987
  - Noelle Zientara: 1988
  - JoAnn Elwell: 1989
  - Michelle Jaworksi: 1990
- Atlantic 10 Rookie of the Year
  - Elizabeth Ramirez: 1986
  - JoAnn Elwell: 1987
  - Tammy Cairl: 1988
  - Kim Kumfer: 1989
- Atlantic 10 Coach of the Year
  - Russ Rose: 1984, 1985, 1987, 1988, 1989

=== Big Ten Awards ===
Penn State has received 15 Player of the Year honors, 14 Freshman of the Year honors, 5 Defensive Player of the Year honors, and 2 Setter of the Year honors. Rose picked up a total of 15 Coach of the Year honors, while Schumacher-Cawley won the award 1 time.

- Big Ten Player of the Year
  - Leanne Kling: 1992
  - Salima Davidson: 1993
  - Terri Zemaitis: 1995
  - Bonnie Bremner: 1997, 1998
  - Lauren Cacciamani: 1999
  - Sam Tortorello: 2005
  - Megan Hodge: 2006, 2009
  - Christa Harmotto: 2007
  - Nicole Fawcett: 2008
  - Blair Brown: 2010
  - Ariel Scott: 2012
  - Simone Lee: 2017
  - Kennedy Martin: 2026
- Big Ten Freshman of the Year
  - Bonnie Bremner: 1996
  - Sam Tortorello: 2002
  - Cassy Salyer: 2003
  - Kate Price: 2004
  - Nicole Fawcett: 2005
  - Megan Hodge: 2006
  - Arielle Wilson: 2007
  - Darcy Dorton: 2009
  - Deja McClendon: 2010
  - Micha Hancock: 2011
  - Megan Courtney: 2012
  - Haleigh Washington: 2014
  - Jonni Parker: 2018
  - Izzy Starck: 2024
- Big Ten Defensive Player/Libero of the Year
  - Kaleena Walters: 2005
  - Katie Slay: 2011
  - Haleigh Washington: 2017
  - Kendall White: 2018, 2019
  - Gillian Grimes: 2025
- Big Ten Setter of the Year
  - Micha Hancock: 2012, 2013
- Big Ten Coach of the Year
  - Russ Rose: 1992, 1993, 1996, 1997, 1998, 2003, 2005, 2006, 2007, 2008, 2009, 2010, 2012, 2013, 2017
  - Katie Schumacher-Cawley: 2024
- Big Ten Female Athlete of the Year
  - Lauren Cacciamani: 1999
  - Megan Hodge: 2010

=== Other awards ===
This list includes awards to Penn State women's volleyball players and coaches by the NCAA, American Volleyball Coaches Association (AVCA), and other special awards.

- NCAA Championship Most Outstanding Player:
  - Terri Zemaitis, 1997
  - Lauren Cacciamani: 1998, 1999
  - Megan Hodge: 2007, 2008
  - Deja McClendon, 2010
  - Micha Hancock, 2013
  - Megan Courtney, 2014
  - Jess Mruzik, 2024
- AVCA National Player of the Year:
  - Lauren Cacciamani, 1999
  - Nicole Fawcett, 2008
  - Megan Hodge, 2009
  - Micha Hancock, 2014
- AVCA National Freshman of the Year:
  - Nicole Fawcett, 2005
  - Megan Hodge, 2006
  - Deja McClendon, 2010
  - Ali Frantti, 2014
  - Izzy Starck, 2024
- AVCA National Coach of the Year:
  - Russ Rose: 1990, 1997, 2007, 2008, 2013
- AVCA Hall of Fame:
  - Tom Tait (inducted in 2003)
  - Russ Rose (inducted in 2007)
- Honda Sports Award winners:
  - Lauren Cacciamani, 1999
  - Nicole Fawcett, 2008
  - Megan Hodge, 2009
  - Blair Brown, 2010

- Honda-Broderick Cup winner:
  - Megan Hodge, 2010
- Senior CLASS Award
  - Ariel Scott, 2013
  - Haleigh Washington, 2017
- Capital One Academic All-American of the Year
  - Bonnie Bremner: 1998, 1999
  - Christa Harmotto, 2008
  - Megan Hodge, 2009
  - Katie Slay, 2013

=== All-Americans ===
Penn State has a long history of All-Americans. In all but one season under Rose, there has been at least one All-American named from his team.

Penn State has had 38 (third all-time) different AVCA All-Americans earning 80 certificates (third all-time), including 44 First Team selections (third all-time). In 2008, Penn State landed an AVCA-record six All-Americans, four of whom were on First Team.

Year	All-Americans	Year	All-Americans cont.
1979	Ellen Crandall	2006	Nicole Fawcett**; Christa Harmotto; Megan Hodge**
1980	Ellen Crandall	2007	Nicole Fawcett**; Christa Harmotto**; Megan Hodge**; Alisha Glass
1981	Ellen Crandall	2008	Nicole Fawcett**; Christa Harmotto**; Megan Hodge**; Alisha Glass**; Blair Brown; Arielle Wilson
1982	Lori Barberich**	2009	Megan Hodge**; Alisha Glass**; Blair Brown**; Arielle Wilson**
1983	Lori Barberich	2010	Blair Brown**; Arielle Wilson**; Deja McClendon
1984	Lori Barberich**	2011	Deja McClendon**; Katie Slay; Ariel Scott
1985	Ellen Hensler	2012	Micha Hancock**; Ariel Scott**; Katie Slay; Deja McClendon
1986	Ellen Hensler	2013	Micha Hancock**; Ariel Scott**; Deja McClendon; Katie Slay
1987	Noelle Zientara	2014	Micha Hancock**; Nia Grant**; Ali Frantti; Aiyana Whitney
1988	Noelle Zientara	2015	Haleigh Washington**; Megan Courtney; Aiyana Whitney
1989	JoAnn Elwell; Michelle Jaworski	2016	Haleigh Washington**; Simone Lee**
1990	Noelle Zientara; JoAnn Elwell; Michelle Jaworski**	2017	Haleigh Washington**; Simone Lee**; Kendall White
1991	Leanne Kling	2018	Kendall White**; Jonni Parker
1992	Leanne Kling**; Salima Davidson	2019	Kaitlyn Hord**; Kendall White; Gabby Blossom
1993	Salima Davidson	2020	Kaitlyn Hord
1994	Salima Davidson**; Laura Cook; Saundi Lamoureux	2021	Kaitlyn Hord, Jonni Parker
1995	Terri Zemaitis	2022	Kashuana Williams
1996	Terri Zemaitis**; Bonnie Bremner; Angie Kammer	2023	Jess Mruzik
1997	Terri Zemaitis**; Bonnie Bremner**; Lauren Cacciamani	2024	Jess Mruzik**; Izzy Starck; Camryn Hannah; Taylor Trammell
1998	Lindsay Anderson; Bonnie Bremner**; Lauren Cacciamani**	2025	Kennedy Martin**; Gillian Grimes
1999	Bonnie Bremner**; Lauren Cacciamani**		
2000	Mishka Levy		
2002	Cara Smith**		
2003	Cara Smith**; Erin Iceman; Sam Tortorello		
2004	Syndie Nadeau; Sam Tortorello**		
2005	Nicole Fawcett; Sam Tortorello**; Melissa Walbridge		

** Denotes First Team selection

== See also ==
- Penn State Nittany Lions men's volleyball
- List of Pennsylvania State University Olympians
- List of NCAA Division I women's volleyball programs
