= 2010 NCAA Division I women's volleyball tournament =

American volleyball competition

2010 NCAA women's Division I volleyball tournament
- 2010 NCAA Final Four logo
- Champions: Penn State (5th title)
- Runner-up: California (1st title match)
- Semifinalists: Texas (7th Final Four); Southern California (9th Final Four)
- Winning coach: Russ Rose (5th title)
- Most outstanding player: Deja McClendon (Penn State)
- Final Four All-Tournament Team: Blair Brown (Penn State); Kristin Carpenter (Penn State); Arielle Wilson (Penn State); Carli Lloyd (California); Tarah Murrey (California); Juliann Faucette (Texas)

The 2010 NCAA Division I women's volleyball tournament began on December 2, 2010 and ended December 18, when Penn State swept California to win an unprecedented fourth straight NCAA title, making it their fifth overall. Penn State head coach Russ Rose became the first Division I coach to win five NCAA titles.

== Records ==
Austin Regional
| Seed | School | Conference | Berth Type | RPI | Record |
|---|---|---|---|---|---|
| | American | Patriot | Automatic | 77 | 29-2 |
| | Austin Peay | Ohio Valley | Automatic | 107 | 26-7 |
| | Cincinnati | Big East | At-large | 17 | 25-10 |
| 1 | Florida | SEC | Automatic | 1 | 27-1 |
| | Florida State | ACC | At-large | 32 | 21-10 |
| | Georgia Southern | Southern | Automatic | 72 | 27-8 |
| 8 | Illinois | Big Ten | At-large | 6 | 22-8 |
| | Kentucky | SEC | At-large | 46 | 17-13 |
| | Louisville | Big East | Automatic | 25 | 22-7 |
| | Middle Tennessee | Sun Belt | Automatic | 21 | 25-9 |
| 16 | Purdue | Big Ten | At-large | 15 | 21-10 |
| | South Carolina State | MEAC | Automatic | 287 | 17-22 |
| 9 | Texas | Big 12 | At-large | 12 | 23-5 |
| | UCLA | Pac-10 | At-large | 27 | 21-8 |
| | UTSA | Southland | Automatic | 123 | 22-11 |
| | Western Kentucky | Sun Belt | At-large | 33 | 27-8 |

Dayton Regional
| Seed | School | Conference | Berth Type | RPI | Record |
|---|---|---|---|---|---|
| | Alabama A&M | SWAC | Automatic | 191 | 16-10 |
| | Albany | America East | Automatic | 94 | 22-8 |
| | Butler | Horizon | Automatic | 99 | 21-9 |
| | Cal State Fullerton | Big West | Automatic | 30 | 26-5 |
| | Colorado State | Mountain West | Automatic | 22 | 25-4 |
| 14 | Dayton | Atlantic 10 | Automatic | 9 | 27-3 |
| | Indiana | Big Ten | At-large | 34 | 21-11 |
| | Lipscomb | Atlantic Sun | Automatic | 63 | 24-6 |
| | Long Beach State | Big West | At-large | 31 | 25-7 |
| | Miami (FL) | ACC | At-large | 18 | 23-8 |
| | New Mexico | Mountain West | At-large | 42 | 20-9 |
| | Ohio State | Big Ten | At-large | 38 | 22-11 |
| | San Diego | West Coast | Automatic | 35 | 23-5 |
| 3 | Stanford | Pac-10 | At-large | 2 | 24-3 |
| 11 | Tennessee | SEC | At-large | 14 | 24-6 |
| 6 | Southern California | Pac-10 | At-large | 8 | 25-4 |

University Park Regional
| Seed | School | Conference | Berth Type | RPI | Record |
|---|---|---|---|---|---|
| | Arizona | Pac-10 | At-large | 36 | 19-10 |
| | Delaware | Colonial | Automatic | 53 | 26-5 |
| 12 | Duke | ACC | Automatic | 13 | 24-6 |
| | High Point | Big South | Automatic | 147 | 22-12 |
| 13 | LSU | SEC | At-large | 16 | 25-4 |
| | Missouri | Big 12 | At-large | 45 | 20-10 |
| | Niagara | MAAC | Automatic | 130 | 25-8 |
| 5 | Northern Iowa | Missouri Valley | Automatic | 4 | 30-2 |
| | Northwestern | Big Ten | At-large | 23 | 19-12 |
| | Ohio | MAC | Automatic | 82 | 21-12 |
| | Oklahoma | Big 12 | At-large | 28 | 21-10 |
| | Penn | Ivy League | Automatic | 88 | 17-10 |
| 4 | Penn State | Big Ten | Automatic | 5 | 26-5 |
| | Tulsa | Conference USA | Automatic | 26 | 30-2 |
| | Virginia Tech | ACC | At-large | 41 | 19-11 |
| | Wichita State | Missouri Valley | At-large | 20 | 21-7 |

Seattle Regional
| Seed | School | Conference | Berth Type | RPI | Record |
|---|---|---|---|---|---|
| | Auburn | SEC | At-large | 44 | 20-12 |
| 7 | California | Pac-10 | Automatic | 10 | 25-3 |
| | Creighton | Missouri Valley | At-large | 29 | 20-11 |
| 15 | Hawaiʻi | WAC | At-large | 11 | 24-6 |
| | Iowa State | Big 12 | At-large | 24 | 20-8 |
| | Michigan | Big Ten | At-large | 39 | 23-9 |
| 10 | Minnesota | Big Ten | At-large | 7 | 24-8 |
| | Mississippi | SEC | At-large | 43 | 19-10 |
| | Missouri State | Missouri Valley | At-large | 40 | 21-9 |
| 2 | Nebraska | Big 12 | At-large | 3 | 27-2 |
| | North Carolina | ACC | At-large | 19 | 24-9 |
| | North Dakota State | Summit | Automatic | 87 | 20-10 |
| | Portland State | Big Sky | Automatic | 110 | 21-8 |
| | Sacred Heart | Northeast | Automatic | 118 | 29-6 |
| | Utah State | WAC | Automatic | 65 | 24-8 |
| | Washington | Pac-10 | At-large | 37 | 21-8 |

== Austin Regional ==
First round December 2–3
1 | Florida | 3
South Carolina State | 0
Gainesville, FL
Georgia Southern | 1
Florida State | 3
Middle Tennessee State | 0
Louisville | 3
West Lafayette, IN
Kentucky | 1
16 | Purdue | 3
9 | Texas | 3
UTSA | 0
Austin, TX
American University | 2
UCLA | 3
Cincinnati | 3
Western Kentucky | 0
Champaign, IL
Austin Peay | 0
8 | Illinois | 3

Second round December 3–4
1 | Florida | 3
Florida State | 2
Louisville | 1
16 | Purdue | 3
9 | Texas | 3
UCLA | 1
Cincinnati | 1
8 | Illinois | 3

Regional semifinals December 10
1 | Florida | 0
16 | Purdue | 3
9 | Texas | 3
8 | Illinois | 2

Regional finals December 11
16 | Purdue | 1
9 | Texas | 3

=== Regional recap ===
The biggest upset of the tournament occurred when Purdue swept top ranked Florida in 3 sets, recording their first win over a #1 team in program history. Despite holding 4 consecutive set points in the 1st set, Florida lost their 24-20 lead and eventually lost 28-26. Florida never seemed to regain their rhythm, as Purdue went up 8-0 in the second set and maintained a 10-point lead throughout the set, winning 25-15. Purdue went up early in the third set as well, and won 25-19, shocking the Gators who had only lost one match all season.

In the other semifinal, Illinois played Texas hard on their home floor, going up 2-1 in sets. However, Texas stormed back to win the fourth set easily and then took control of the fifth set, winning 15-11.

In the regional final, Purdue won the first set rather easily but lost their senior starting setter Jaclyn Hart to an apparent leg injury in the late stages of set 1. Hart did not end up returning in the match, as Texas dominated sets 2 and 3. Despite Purdue going up early and showing signs of life in what was the final set, Texas won the fourth set 27-25 to earn their third straight trip to the Final Four and a rematch of the 2009 NCAA Championship final with Penn State in the national semifinals.

Austin Regional All-Tournament Team
- Juliann Faucette (Most Outstanding Player) - Texas
- Michelle Kocher - Texas
- Rachael Adams - Texas
- Jennifer Doris - Texas
- Jaclyn Hart - Purdue
- Ariel Turner - Purdue
- Jazmine Orozco - Illinois

== University Park Regional ==
First round December 2–3
5 | Northern Iowa | 2
Missouri | 3
Cedar Falls, IA
Arizona | 1
Northwestern | 3
Ohio | 3
Penn | 0
Durham, NC
High Point | 0
12 | Duke | 3
13 | LSU | 0
Tulsa | 3
Norman, OK
Wichita State | 0
Oklahoma | 3
Virginia Tech | 3
Delaware | 0
University Park, PA
Niagara | 0
4 | Penn State | 3

Second round December 3–4
Missouri | 3
Northwestern | 1
Ohio | 2
12 | Duke | 3
Tulsa | 2
Oklahoma | 3
Virginia Tech | 0
4 | Penn State | 3

Regional semifinals December 10
Missouri | 1
12 | Duke | 3
Oklahoma | 0
4 | Penn State | 3

Regional finals December 11
12 | Duke | 1
4 | Penn State | 3

=== Regional recap ===
Having upset the 5th overall seed in the tournament in the 1st round, Missouri advanced to the Sweet 16 to face 12th seeded Duke. Duke won in four sets, and advanced to the Elite Eight, which was the first time that an ACC team made it past the Sweet 16.

Penn State downed Oklahoma in 3 sets, as senior All-American Blair Brown had 24 kills. In the regional final against Duke, Penn State won the first two sets rather easily, 25-19, 25-18, but Duke came back to win the third set 25-23. It was the first time since the 2006 tournament that Penn State lost a single set before the Final Four. In the fourth set, Penn State knocked off any chance of an upset, as they separated themselves early from Duke and won 25-17. Big Ten Freshman of the Year Deja McClendon had a career high 20 kills while Blair Brown added 16 kills. Penn State also extended their NCAA-record home court winning streak to 94 matches.

University Park All-Tournament Team
- Blair Brown (Most Outstanding Player) - Penn State
- Deja McClendon - Penn State
- Kristin Carpenter - Penn State
- Sophia Dunworth - Duke
- Kellie Catanach - Duke
- Brianne Barker - Oklahoma
- Paola Ampudia - Missouri

== Dayton Regional ==
First round December 2–3
3 | Stanford | 3
Albany (NY) | 0
Stanford, CA
Cal State Fullerton | 2
Colorado State | 3
Ohio State | 3
Lipscomb | 1
Dayton, OH
Butler | 0
14 | Dayton | 3
11 | Tennessee | 3
Alabama A&M | 0
Bloomington, IN
Miami (FL) | 2
Indiana | 3
San Diego | 3
Long Beach State | 0
Los Angeles, CA
New Mexico | 0
6 | Southern California | 3

Second round December 3–4
3 | Stanford | 3
Colorado State | 0
Ohio State | 3
14 | Dayton | 2
11 | Tennessee | 2
Indiana | 3
San Diego | 1
6 | Southern California | 3

Regional semifinals December 10
3 | Stanford | 3
Ohio State | 1
Indiana | 0
6 | Southern California | 3

Regional finals December 11
3 | Stanford | 2
6 | Southern California | 3

=== Regional recap ===
Third-seeded Stanford downed Ohio State in four sets, with the help of senior Alix Klineman's 29 kills. Southern California defeated Indiana in straight sets, setting up an All-Pac-10 regional final. In the regular season, Stanford beat Southern Cal both times.

Stanford jumped out to an early lead, winning the first set 25–20, however Southern Cal responded by winning the second set 25–17. With 11 tie scores and three lead changes, the third set was competitive but Stanford pulled out the win, 25–22. The fourth set was also a close battle, as it had 10 tie scores and three lead changes, but Southern Cal narrowly defeated Stanford, 26–24, and forced a fifth set. Despite having a 10–7 advantage in the decisive fifth set, Southern Cal responded to tie the set up at 11. Stanford held a match point at 14–13, but Southern Cal's freshman Falyn Fonoimoana, who was the top recruit in the 2010 class, recorded a kill to tie it up at 14. A Stanford hitting error gave Southern Cal match point, before a block by Fonoimoana and fellow freshman Alexis Olgard won the set, 16–14, and the match, 3–2.

It was the first time since the 2007 season that Southern Cal defeated Stanford. Alix Klineman finished her career with 2,008 kills, and joined former Stanford great Ogonna Nnamani as the only two players to have more than 2,000 career kills.

Dayton Regional All-Tournament Team
- Falyn Fonoimoana (Most Outstanding Player) – Southern California
- Kendall Bateman – Southern California
- Alex Jupiter – Southern California
- Alix Klineman – Stanford
- Cassidy Lichtman – Stanford
- Katie Dull – Ohio State
- Ashley Benson – Indiana

== Seattle Regional ==
First round December 2–3
7 | California | 3
Utah State | 0
Berkeley, CA
Ole Miss | 0
North Carolina | 3
Iowa State | 2
Creighton | 3
Minneapolis, MN
North Dakota State | 0
10 | Minnesota | 3
15 | Hawaiʻi | 3
Portland State | 0
Seattle, WA
Washington | 3
Michigan | 0
Auburn | 3
Missouri State | 0
Lincoln, NE
Sacred Heart | 0
2 | Nebraska | 3

Second round December 3–4
7 | California | 3
North Carolina | 0
Creighton | 0
10 | Minnesota | 3
15 | Hawaiʻi | 0
Washington | 3
Auburn | 0
2 | Nebraska | 3

Regional semifinals December 10
7 | California | 3
10 | Minnesota | 0
Washington | 3
2 | Nebraska | 1

Regional finals December 11
7 | California | 3
Washington | 0

=== Regional recap ===
Seventh seeded California swept Minnesota in 3 close sets, 26-24, 25-23, 25-23 to advance to the program's fourth straight NCAA Regional Final.

In the other Regional semifinal, unseeded Washington stunned overall #2 seeded Nebraska in four sets (25-16, 20-25, 25-21, 29-27). The fourth set of the match was considered controversial. Washington held a set point on which they hit a shot which might have been touched by the Nebraska block, but was ruled out, allowing Nebraska to tie up the set. Then Nebraska held a set point on which a kill attempt by Washington landed near the back line and was called in by the line judge, allowing Washington to tie up the set. Nebraska players and coaches were visibly upset as they thought they had won the point and started to celebrate. Washington then scored the next two points and won the match. When Nebraska head coach John Cook shook hands with Washington head coach Jim McLaughlin, he allegedly said "The ball was out. Nice Match" to which McLaughlin allegedly responded with foul language and had to be restrained. Both the controversial call and the coach incident were hot topics on the news outlets.

California, which had already beaten Washington twice in the regular season, then swept the Huskies in the regional final (25-21, 25-20, 25-14).

Seattle Regional All-Tournament Team
- Carli Lloyd (Most Outstanding Player) - California
- Shannon Hawari - California
- Tarah Murrey - California
- Kindra Carlson - Washington
- Bianca Rowland - Washington
- Lauren Gibbemeyer - Minnesota
- Jordan Wilberger - Nebraska

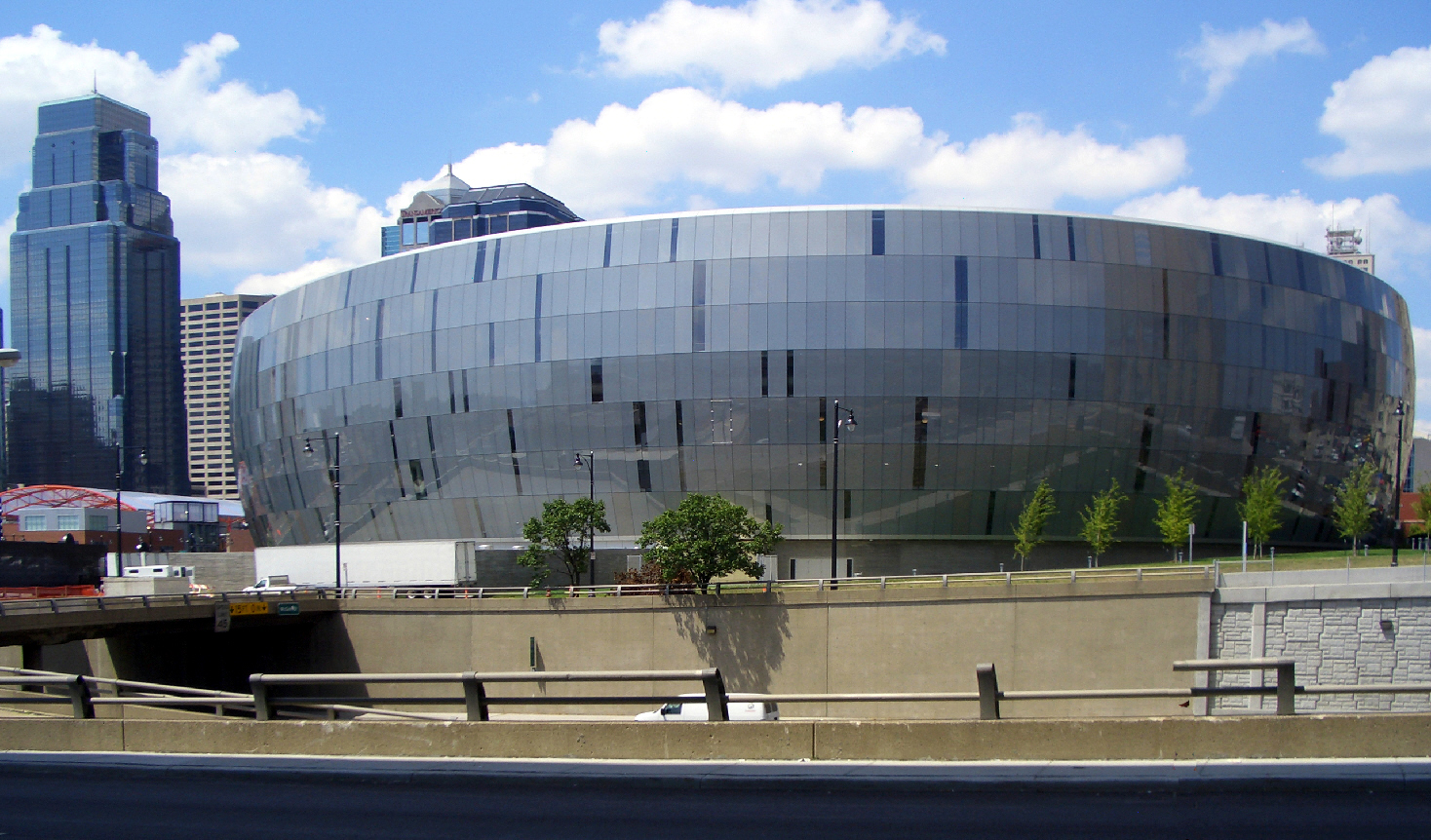
The Sprint Center hosted 2010 NCAA Women's Volleyball Final Four

== Final Four ==
National semifinals December 16
9 | Texas | 0
4 | Penn State | 3
6 | Southern California | 0
7 | California | 3

National Championship; December 18
4 | Penn State | 3
7 | California | 0

=== Semifinals recap ===
==== Penn State vs. Texas ====
| Teams | Set 1 | Set 2 | Set 3 |
| PSU | 25 | 25 | 25 |
| TEX | 13 | 13 | 22 |

In the rematch of the 2009 finals, Penn State defeated Texas in straight sets, 25-13, 25-13, 25-22. Led by AVCA National Freshman of the Year Deja McClendon, who had 11 kills on 15 errorless attempts, Penn State held Texas to just .131 hitting as a team in the sweep. Penn State's freshmen had 24 of the team's 54 kills in the match, as Katie Slay and Ariel Scott also made big contributions. On Texas's side, senior All-American and Big 12 Player of the Year Juliann Faucette led all players with 14 kills, and she was the only Texas player with double-digit kills. Penn State improved its all-time program record to 11-6 over Texas, and became the first team in NCAA history to advance to four straight NCAA Championship finals.

==== California vs. Southern California ====
| Teams | Set 1 | Set 2 | Set 3 |
| CAL | 25 | 25 | 25 |
| USC | 14 | 17 | 20 |

Despite USC defeating California in both Pac-10 matchups earlier in the season, California took control of the match from the start, going up 11-2 in set 1 and eventually defeating USC easily in a sweep, 25-14, 25-17, 25-20. Cal Junior All-American Tarah Murrey had 23 kills and hit .413, while Adrienne Gehan, a freshman, was second on the team with 14 kills. Cal setter Carli Lloyd, who was named the National Player of the Year the day after the match, had 39 assists and 16 digs in the match. USC hit just .101 as a team and only 1 player hit higher than .200, as Katie Fuller was USC's only offensive spark in the match as she had 7 kills and hit .400. California advanced to the programs first ever final match to face the same team who ended their seasons in the NCAA tournament the previous three years.

=== National Championship recap: Penn State vs. California ===
| Teams | Set 1 | Set 2 | Set 3 |
| PSU | 25 | 27 | 25 |
| CAL | 20 | 25 | 20 |

Playing each other for the fourth consecutive year in the tournament, Penn State defeated California once again in a sweep by the scores of 25-20, 27-25, 25-20. Deja McClendon, who had 16 kills in the final, was named the Final Four Most Outstanding Player and became only the second player in NCAA history (the other being Kerri Walsh from 1996) to win the award as a freshman. Senior Blair Brown had 18 kills against the Bears, while Cal hitter Tarah Murrey led her team with 16 kills.

In set 1, Penn State held a slim 12-11 lead but kills by McClendon and Brown and a service ace from Alyssa D'Errico made the score 16-12. Cal fought back to cut the lead to 16-15, but Penn State pulled away again to lead 21-17. Two Brown kills and a kill from freshman Ariel Scott sealed the first set, 25-20. It was the first set Cal lost in the entire tournament.

Set 2 was a battle throughout, and Cal took a 3-point lead at 17-14. However Penn State fought back to tie it at 17. Two Penn State blocks put them up 19-17, but Cal responded with kills and a block to make the score dead even at 20-20. Two straight Cal kills gave them set point 24-23, however Penn State tied it up at 24. 2010 National Player of the Year Carli Lloyd gave the Bears another set point at 25-24 with a kill, but Penn State used another crucial block to tie it up at 25. Two Brown kills won set 2 for the Nittany Lions, 27-25.

Cal stepped up its blocking in what was the final set, taking a 10-6 lead. However Penn State clawed its way back after a timeout and took a 13-12 lead. Freshman Ali Longo for Penn State ended up serving 8 straight points which included 3 service aces and Penn State went up 18-13. Cal came within 3 at 18-15 but another Penn State run put them up 23-16 and only 2 points away from the title. Cal outscored Penn State 4-2 in the final points, but a kill by freshman Katie Slay on an overpass sealed the set, 25-20, as Penn State went on to win their fourth straight NCAA title. Penn State seniors Brown, D'Errico, and Arielle Wilson went 24-0 in NCAA play their entire careers, and had a four-year overall record of 142-7. Wilson also graduated as the NCAA career hitting percentage leader.

Final Four All-Tournament Team:
- Deja McClendon - Penn State (Most Outstanding Player)
- Arielle Wilson - Penn State
- Blair Brown - Penn State
- Kristin Carpenter - Penn State
- Carli Lloyd - California
- Tarah Murrey - California
- Juliann Faucette - Texas
