= Blair Brown Lipsitz =

American volleyball player (born 1988)

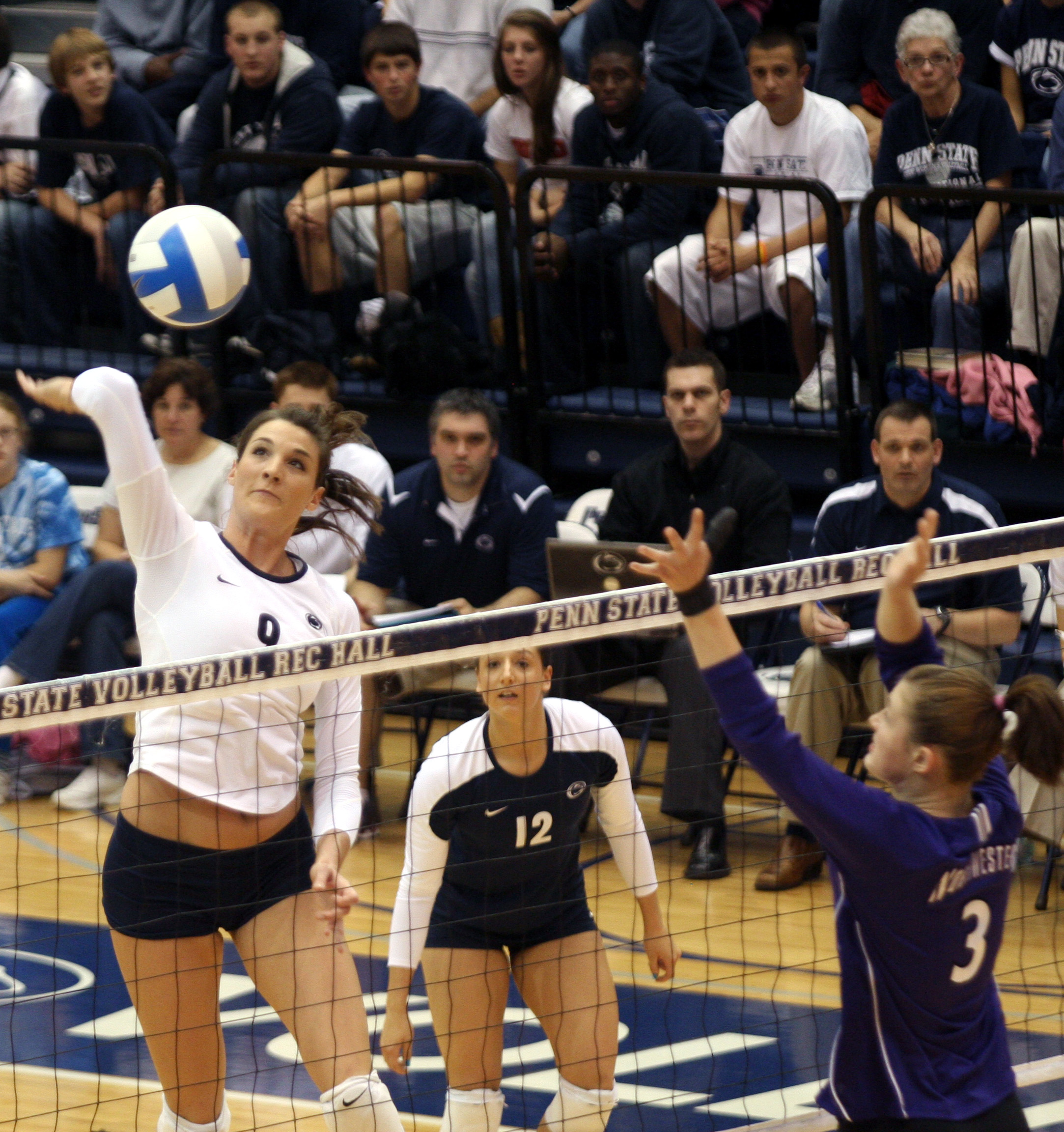
- Brown spiking in a match against Northwestern on 14 November 2009.

Personal information
- Nationality: American
- Born: April 5, 1988 (age 38)
- Height: 6–5
- Education: Penn State (2007–11)

Volleyball information
- Position: Opposite

Jennifer "Blair" Brown Lipsitz (born March 5, 1988) is a writer and mental performance consultant, and was formerly a volleyball player and coach.

== Early life ==
Brown Lipsitz grew up in Purcellville, Virginia and attended Loudoun Valley High School, where she helped lead her team to an undefeated season and state championship. She was inducted into the school's hall of fame in 2017.

== College ==
Brown Lipsitz attended Penn State where she was a member of the teams that won four consecutive national championships, 2007, 2008, 2009, and 2010. She won the Honda Sports Award as the best female collegiate volleyball player in 2010–11. In 2011, she was nominated for the Best Female College Athlete ESPY Award.

== Coaching ==
Brown Lipsitz started as a volunteer assistant on the volleyball coaching staff at Buffalo in 2014, then in 2015, was named the head volleyball coach, where she remained until 2019.

== Awards and honors ==
- Virginia Gatorade Player of the year (2004, 2005)
- Honda Sports Award for volleyball
