= Simone Lee =

American volleyball player

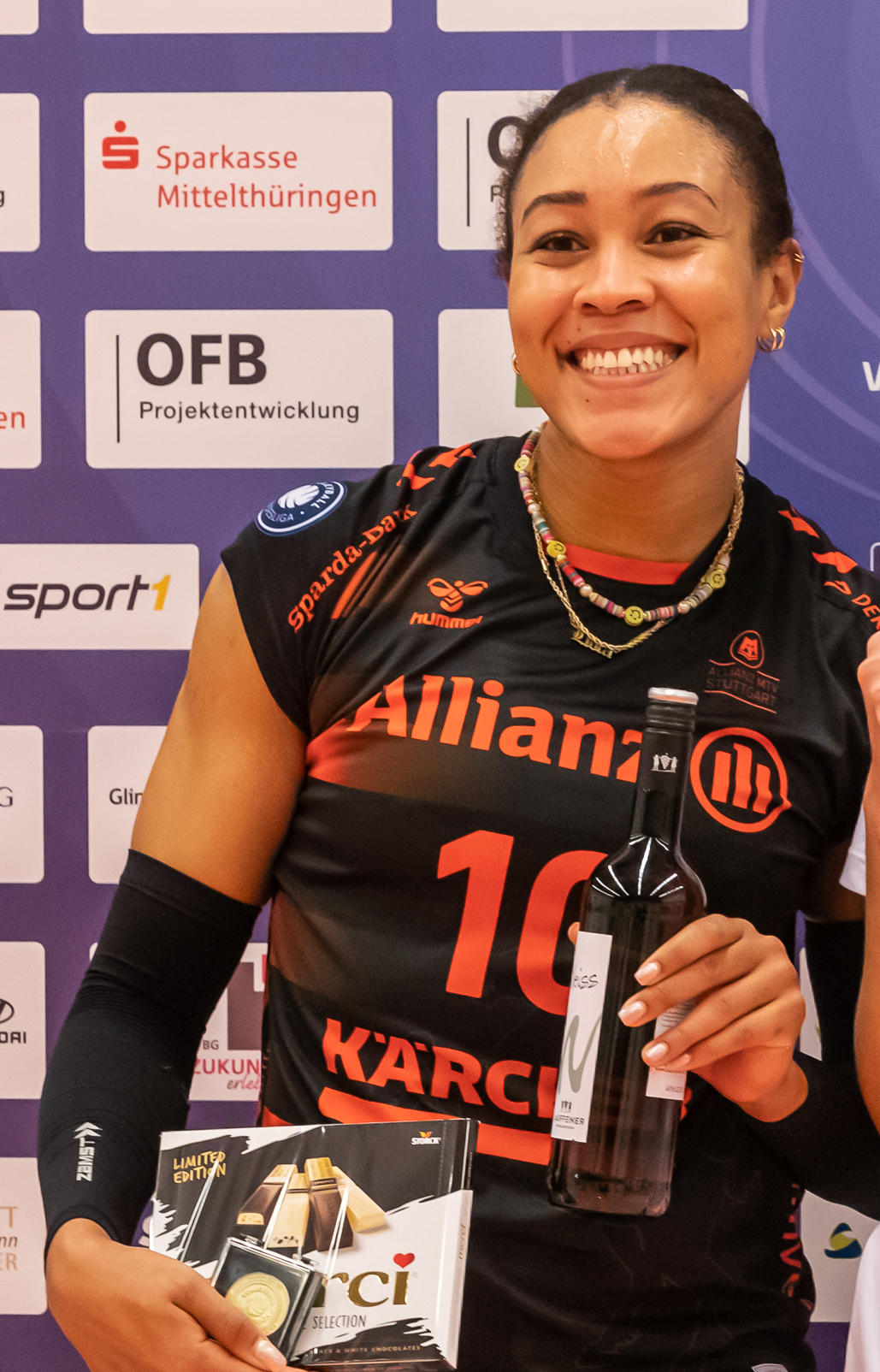
- Lee in 2022

Personal information
- Full name: Simone Alexandria Lee
- Nationality: United States
- Born: October 7, 1996 (age 30); Milwaukee, Wisconsin, U.S.
- Hometown: Menomonee Falls, Wisconsin, U.S.
- Height: 6 ft 1 in (1.86 m)
- Spike: 120 in (305 cm)
- Block: 120 in (305 cm)
- Education: Penn State University

Volleyball information
- Position: Outside hitter
- Current club: (Brazil) Sesc Flamengo
- Number: 2

Career
Years	Teams
2014–2017	(United States) Penn State
2017–2018	(Italy) Imoco Volley Conegliano
2018–2019	(Turkey) Beylikdüzü Vİ
2019–2020	(Germany) Allianz MTV Stuttgart
2019–2021	(Japan) Kurobe AquaFairies
2022–2023	(Germany) Allianz MTV Stuttgart
2023-2024	(Turkey) Sarıyer Belediyesi
2023-2024	(Italy) Volleyball Casalmaggiore
2024-2025	(Italy) Megabox Vallefoglia
2025-	(Brazil) Sesc Flamengo

National team
2012–2013	United States U18 team
2018	United States
Medal record
Representing the United States
Pan-American Cup
Gold medal – first place	2018 Santo Domingo
Bronze medal – third place	2023 Ponce
Pan American Cup Final Six
Gold medal – first place	2023 Santo Domingo
FIVB U18 World Championship
Silver medal – second place	2013 Nakhon Ratchasima
NORCECA U18 Championship
Gold medal – first place	2012 Tijuana

Simone Alexandria Lee (born October 7, 1996) is an American volleyball player. She plays as an outside hitter for Brazilian professional team Sesc Flamengo.

== Career ==
=== College ===
Simone Lee played for Penn State University from 2014 to 2017, taking the national title during her freshman year, reaching another Final 4 during her senior year.

=== U.S. national team ===
She made her debut in the United States senior national team at the 2018 Pan American Volleyball Cup, where she won the gold medal, and in 2019 at the FIVB Volleyball Nations League.

=== Professional ===
In December 2017, she signed her first professional contract with Imoco Volley, where she played the remainder of the 2017-18 season, winning the Scudetto. In the following season she played in the Turkish Sultanlar Ligi with Beylikdüzü Vİ.

In the 2019-20 season, she went to Japan, where she participated in the V.League Division 1 with the Kurobe AquaFairies; at the end of the commitments with the Asian team, she played in Germany for the final of the 1. Bundesliga with MTV Stuttgart. In the following season she returned to the Kurobe club, while in the 2021-22 season she plays again for Stuttgart.
