= Lauren Cacciamani =

American volleyball player

Personal information
- Nationality: United States
- Height: 6–2
- Education: Penn State

Volleyball information
- Position: Middle blocker

Lauren Cacciamani is a former volleyball player for Penn State.

== College ==
Cacciamani attended Penn State from 1996 to 1999 where she played volleyball for four years. In her sophomore season, she helped the Nittany Lions to make it to the Championship match of the 1997 NCAA Division I women's volleyball tournament. Penn State was matched up against Stanford, who has only lost two matches all season, both to Penn State. Stanford won the first two games, but Penn State came back to win the next two. Stanford won the final game so Penn State came away as national champion runner-up.

In her junior year, Cacciamani again helped lead her team to the Championship match of the 1998 NCAA Division I women's volleyball tournament. This time the opponent was undefeated Long Beach State, but the match unfolded in a sequence reminiscent of the previous year. Long Beach won the first two games, needing only one more game for the national championship. However, Penn State came back to win the next two games and force a decisive fifth game. Penn State led early in the fifth game, but Long Beach came back and won, leaving Penn State as the runner-up once again. Despite the loss, Cacciamani was named as the co-MVP of the tournament, along with Misty May of Long Beach.

In her senior year, Cacciamani helped lead her team back to the title match of the 1999 NCAA Division I women's volleyball tournament. The opponent this year was Stanford, who had beaten them two years prior, but this time Penn State prevailed, winning the first three game to win their first ever national championship. Cacciamani had eight blocks along with a match-high 20 kills and was named the MVP of the tournament. She was also named the co-National Player of the year by the AVCA along with Kerri Walsh.

In 2000, she was the winner of the Honda Sports Award, given to the nation's top female collegiate volleyball player.

== Awards and honors ==
- AVCA National Player of the year (1999)
- MVP of NCAA Division I women's volleyball tournament (1998, 1999)
- Honda Sports Award (2000)
