= 1998 NCAA Division I women's volleyball tournament =

Volleyball competition

1998 NCAA women's Division I volleyball tournament
- 1998 NCAA Final Four logo
- Champions: Long Beach State (3rd NCAA (5th national) title)
- Runner-up: Penn State (3rd title match)
- Semifinalists: Florida (5th Final Four); Nebraska (6th Final Four)
- Winning coach: Brian Gimmillaro (3rd title)
- Most outstanding player: Misty May (Long Beach State); Lauren Cacciamani (Penn State)
- Final Four All-Tournament Team: Benishe Dillard (Long Beach State); Veronica Walls (Long Beach State); Jessica Alvarado (Long Beach State); Bonnie Bremner (Penn State)

The 1998 NCAA Division I women's volleyball tournament began on December 3, 1998, with 64 teams and ended December 19 when Long Beach State defeated Penn State 3 games to 2 in Madison, Wisconsin, for the program's third NCAA title and fifth national title overall.

With the victory, Long Beach State became the first team in NCAA history to complete an undefeated season. Penn State, which had also entered the tournament undefeated, finished as runner-up for the second consecutive year.

The NCAA's expansion from 56 teams to 64 began in 1998.

== Records ==
The NCAA women's volleyball tournament expanded to 64 teams in 1998, joining the men's and women's basketball tournaments as the only 64-team NCAA Tournaments at the time. The NCAA baseball tournament would expand to the same size in 1999, followed by the NCAA women's soccer tournament in 2001 and the NCAA softball tournament in 2003. The Big Ten and Big 12 each earned six bids in 1998. The Pac-10 only received four bids in the 1998 NCAA Tournament, which is the fewest they have earned in the 64-team era.

Mountain Regional
| Seed | School | Conference | Berth Type | Record |
|---|---|---|---|---|
| | Arizona | Pac-10 | At-large | 21-6 |
| | Colorado | Big 12 | At-large | 21-7 |
| | Colorado State | WAC | At-large | 23-7 |
| | Eastern Washington | Big Sky | At-large | 24-5 |
| | Fresno State | WAC | At-large | 18-10 |
| 4 | Illinois | Big Ten | At-large | 20-10 |
| 1 | Long Beach State | Big West | Automatic | 30-0 |
| | Milwaukee | Midwestern Collegiate | Automatic | 25-5 |
| | Notre Dame | Big East | Automatic | 17-12 |
| | San Jose State | WAC | At-large | 21-11 |
| | South Carolina | SEC | At-large | 21-10 |
| | Southeast Missouri State | Ohio Valley | Automatic | 24-11 |
| | Southern | SWAC | Automatic | 19-12 |
| | Southwest Texas State | Southland | Automatic | 25-8 |
| 2 | Stanford | Pac-10 | Automatic | 25-3 |
| 3 | Texas | Big 12 | At-large | 24-2 |

Central Regional
| Seed | School | Conference | Berth Type | Record |
|---|---|---|---|---|
| | American | CAA | Automatic | 29-5 |
| | Bucknell | Patriot | Automatic | 16-11 |
| 2 | BYU | WAC | At-large | 28-3 |
| | Cal State Sacramento | Big Sky | Automatic | 25-8 |
| | Clemson | ACC | At-large | 21-10 |
| | Coastal Carolina | Big South | Automatic | 23-12 |
| | Fairfield | MAAC | Automatic | 35-1 |
| | Florida Atlantic | Trans America | Automatic | 16-5 |
| | Florida State | ACC | Automatic | 25-10 |
| | Georgetown | Big East | At-large | 24-5 |
| | Houston | Conference USA | At-large | 21-12 |
| | Kansas State | Big 12 | At-large | 18-11 |
| 4 | Louisville | Conference USA | Automatic | 27-4 |
| | Northern Illinois | MAC | At-large | 26-6 |
| 3 | Pacific | Big West | At-large | 24-5 |
| 1 | Penn State | Big Ten | Automatic | 30-0 |

East Regional
| Seed | School | Conference | Berth Type | Record |
|---|---|---|---|---|
| 3 | Arkansas | SEC | At-large | 27-5 |
| | Brown | Ivy League | Automatic | 23-8 |
| | Chattanooga | Southern | Automatic | 23-10 |
| 1 | Florida | SEC | Automatic | 31-2 |
| 2 | Hawaii | WAC | Automatic | 29-2 |
| | Indiana | Big Ten | At-large | 15-13 |
| | Miami (OH) | MAC | Automatic | 26-7 |
| | Nevada | Big West | At-large | 22-6 |
| | New Hampshire | America East | Automatic | 24-10 |
| | Northern Iowa | Missouri Valley | Automatic | 25-2 |
| | Ohio State | Big Ten | At-large | 16-13 |
| | Temple | Atlantic 10 | Automatic | 22-9 |
| | Texas A&M | Big 12 | At-large | 20-8 |
| | Texas Tech | Big 12 | At-large | 23-10 |
| | UMBC | Northeast | Automatic | 22-6 |
| 4 | USC | Pac-10 | At-large | 22-5 |

Pacific Regional
| Seed | School | Conference | Berth Type | Record |
|---|---|---|---|---|
| | Ark.-Little Rock | Sun Belt | Automatic | 20-8 |
| | Illinois State | Missouri Valley | At-large | 22-9 |
| 4 | Michigan State | Big Ten | At-large | 23-6 |
| | Morgan State | MEAC | Automatic | 18-14 |
| 1 | Nebraska | Big 12 | Automatic | 28-1 |
| | North Carolina | ACC | At-large | 28-7 |
| | Oral Roberts | Mid-Continent | Automatic | 29-5 |
| | Pepperdine | West Coast | At-large | 17-10 |
| | San Diego | West Coast | Automatic | 23-5 |
| | Santa Clara | West Coast | At-large | 20-9 |
| | South Florida | Conference USA | At-large | 25-7 |
| | UCLA | Pac-10 | At-large | 15-11 |
| 3 | UC Santa Barbara | Big West | At-large | 26-5 |
| | Utah | WAC | At-large | 20-9 |
| | Virginia | ACC | At-large | 26-7 |
| 2 | Wisconsin | Big Ten | At-large | 27-4 |

== Mountain Regional (Long Beach) ==
First round December 3–4
1 | Long Beach State | 3
Southern | 0
Long Beach, CA
Arizona | 3
Fresno State | 0
Colorado | 3
San Jose State | 0
Champaign, IL
4 | Illinois | 3
SW Texas State | 1
Colorado State | 3
South Carolina | 2
Austin, TX
3 | Texas | 3
UW–Milwaukee | 0
Notre Dame | 3
Eastern Washington | 1
Stanford, CA
2 | Stanford | 3
SE Missouri State | 1

Second round December 5–6
1 | Long Beach State | 3
Arizona | 0
Colorado | 1
4 | Illinois | 3
Colorado State | 0
3 | Texas | 3
Notre Dame | 0
2 | Stanford | 3

Regional semifinals December 10–11
1 | Long Beach State | 3
4 | Illinois | 0
3 | Texas | 3
2 | Stanford | 1

Regional finals December 12–13
1 | Long Beach State | 3
3 | Texas | 0

== East Regional (Gainesville) ==
First round December 3–4
1 | Florida | 3
Chattanooga | 0
Gainesville, FL
Texas Tech | 2
Ohio State | 3
Texas A&M | 3
Temple | 1
Los Angeles, CA
4 | Southern California | 3
UMBC | 0
Northern Iowa | 0
Indiana | 3
Fayetteville, AR
3 | Arkansas | 3
New Hampshire | 0
Nevada | 0
Miami (Oh.) | 3
Honolulu, HI
2 | Hawaiʻi | 3
Brown | 0

Second round December 5–6
1 | Florida | 3
Ohio State | 1
Texas A&M | 1
4 | Southern California | 3
Indiana | 0
3 | Arkansas | 3
Miami (Oh.) | 0
2 | Hawaiʻi | 3

Regional semifinals December 10–11
1 | Florida | 3
4 | Southern California | 1
3 | Arkansas | 0
2 | Hawaiʻi | 3

Regional finals December 12–13
1 | Florida | 3
2 | Hawaiʻi | 2

== Central Regional (University Park) ==
First round December 3–4
1 | Penn State | 3
Bucknell | 0
University Park, PA
Fairfield | 0
Clemson | 3
Florida State | 1
Northern Illinois | 3
Louisville, KY
4 | Louisville | 3
American | 0
Sacramento State | 3
Houston | 0
Stockton, CA
3 | Pacific | 3
Florida Atlantic | 0
Kansas State | 3
Georgetown | 0
Provo, UT
2 | BYU | 3
Coastal Carolina | 0

Second round December 5–6
1 | Penn State | 3
Clemson | 0
Northern Illinois | 1
4 | Louisville | 3
Sacramento State | 0
3 | Pacific | 3
Kansas State | 0
2 | BYU | 3

Regional semifinals December 10–11
1 | Penn State | 3
4 | Louisville | 0
3 | Pacific | 1
2 | BYU | 3

Regional finals December 12–13
1 | Penn State | 3
2 | BYU | 0

== Pacific Regional (Lincoln) ==
First round December 3–4
1 | Nebraska | 3
Morgan State | 0
Lincoln, NE
Utah | 3
Illinois State | 0
North Carolina | 3
Oral Roberts | 2
East Lansing, MI
4 | Michigan State | 2
Pepperdine | 3
Virginia | 1
UCLA | 3
Santa Barbara, CA
3 | UCSB | 3
Santa Clara | 0
South Florida | 0
San Diego | 3
Madison, WI
2 | Wisconsin | 3
Arkansas-Little Rock | 0

Second round December 5–6
1 | Nebraska | 3
Utah | 1
North Carolina | 0
Pepperdine | 3
UCLA | 1
3 | UCSB | 3
San Diego | 0
2 | Wisconsin | 3

Regional semifinals December 10–11
1 | Nebraska | 3
Pepperdine | 2
3 | UCSB | 2
2 | Wisconsin | 3

Regional finals December 12–13
1 | Nebraska | 3
2 | Wisconsin | 2

== Final Four – Kohl Center, Madison, Wisconsin ==
National Semifinals; December 17
1 | Long Beach State | 3
1 | Florida | 0
1 | Penn State | 3
1 | Nebraska | 1

National Championship; December 19
1 | Long Beach State | 3
1 | Penn State | 2

== National Semifinals ==
=== Long Beach State vs. Florida ===
| Teams | Game 1 | Game 2 | Game 3 |
| LBSU | 15 | 15 | 15 |
| FLA | 2 | 8 | 10 |

Long Beach advanced to the finals easily, taking the 10-0 lead in the opening game before winning 15-2. Florida staved off seven game points in the second game before falling 15-8. Long Beach then won a closer third game to sweep the Gators.

Misty May put down 11 kills and had two service aces, while Jessica Alvarado led the 49ers with 12 kills.

=== Penn State vs. Nebraska ===
| Teams | Game 1 | Game 2 | Game 3 | Game 4 |
| PSU | 15 | 15 | 8 | 15 |
| NEB | 11 | 8 | 15 | 11 |

Lauren Cacciamani had 20 kills, Christy Cochran had 19 and the three-time all-American Bonnie Bremner had 13 to help Penn State beat No. 3 Nebraska in four games. The Huskers ended their season 32-2 while Penn State improved to 35-0 and advanced to the program's third title match.

== National Championship: Long Beach State vs. Penn State ==
| Teams | Game 1 | Game 2 | Game 3 | Game 4 | Game 5 |
| LBSU | 15 | 15 | 13 | 14 | 15 |
| PSU | 3 | 10 | 15 | 16 | 12 |

Long Beach took the first two games easily, 15-3 and 15-10. However, like the 1997 NCAA championship, Penn State took the next two games to force a fifth game.

In the decisive rally-scoring fifth game, Penn State led 7-2, but Long Beach tied it up at 8. Tied at 12, Long Beach State's Jessica Alvardo put down two kills before Veronica Wall's 19th kill of the night ended the match, 15-12. Long Beach State's Misty May, also the AVCA National Player of the Year, was named the co-MVP of the Championship along with Penn State's Lauren Cacciamani.

== NCAA Tournament records ==
There are two NCAA tournament records that were set in the 1998 tournament.

- Service aces, tournament (individual record) - Misty May, Long Beach State - 20 (4 vs. Southern, 4 vs. Arizona, 4 vs. Illinois, 4 vs. Texas, 2 vs. Florida, 2 vs. Penn State)
- Service aces, tournament (team record) - Long Beach State - 43 (shared with 2007 Penn State) (15 vs. Southern, 7 vs. Arizona, 8 vs. Illinois, 6 vs. Texas, 4 vs. Florida, 3 vs. Penn State)
