= 2015 Penn State Nittany Lions women's volleyball team =

American college volleyball season

2015 Penn State Nittany Lions women's volleyball

NCAA regional semifinal, L vs. Hawaii 0-3 (22-25, 25-27, 16-25)
- Conference: Big Ten Conference

Ranking
- Coaches: No. 8
- Record: 28-6 (15-5 (4th) Big Ten)
- Head coach: Russ Rose (36th season)
- Associate head coach: Salima Rockwell (5th season)
- Home arena: Rec Hall (Capacity: 6,502)

In 2015, Penn State finished 4th in the Big Ten and advanced only to the NCAA Region Semifinal where they were swept by Hawaii. Penn State began the year ranked #1 after having won the national championship the previous two seasons.

== Roster ==
Penn State lost 4 important players from the previous year's championship team. Setter Micha Hancock, middle blocker Nia Grant, libero Dominique Gonzalez and defensive specialist Lacey Fuller all graduated. The four returning starters were Megan Courtney, Ali Frantti, Haleigh Washington and Aiyana Whitney. While Whitney was a returning starter, she played much of the season at middle blocker which was a new position for her in 2015.

Prior to the 2015 season, Whitney was selected to represent Penn State on the Big Ten Volleyball Foreign Tour, where a team composed of players from each conference school competed in Slovenia, Croatia and Italy over the summer.

Number	Player	Position	Year	Height
2	(United States) Lara Caraway	DS	SR	5 ft 4 in (1.63 m)
3	(United States) Kendall Pierce	Libero	SR	5 ft 5 in (1.65 m)
4	(Puerto Rico) Wilma Rivera	Setter/DS	FR	5 ft 8 in (1.73 m)
5	(United States) Ali Frantti	OH	SO	6 ft 2 in (1.88 m)
6	(United States) Nia Reed	OH	RS FR	6 ft 2 in (1.88 m)
8	(United States) Lainy Pierce	DS	SO	5 ft 6 in (1.68 m)
10	(United States) Carley Muller	DS	JR	5 ft 8 in (1.73 m)
11	(Canada) Tori Gorrell	MB	FR	6 ft 2 in (1.88 m)
12	(United States) Keeton Holcomb	Libero	FR	5 ft 5 in (1.65 m)
13	(United States) Taylor Krause	DS	JR	5 ft 6 in (1.68 m)
14	(United States) Aiyana Whitney	OH/MB	RS SR	6 ft 3 in (1.91 m)
15	(United States) Haleigh Washington	MB	SO	6 ft 3 in (1.91 m)
16	(Serbia) Jelena Novakovic	OPP	FR	6 ft 2 in (1.88 m)
17	(United States) Megan Courtney	OH	SR	6 ft 1 in (1.85 m)
19	(United States) Heidi Thelen	MB	SO	6 ft 2 in (1.88 m)
21	(United States) Bryanna Weiskircher	Setter	RS FR	6 ft 0 in (1.83 m)
22	(United States) Simone Lee	OH	SO	6 ft 1 in (1.85 m)
24	(United States) Laura Broerman	DS	JR	5 ft 3 in (1.60 m)

=== Coaches ===
- Russ Rose - Head Coach
- Salima Rockwell - Associate Head Coach
- Stevie Mussie - Assistant coach
- Jesse Tupac - Director of Volleyball Operations
- Shawn Sangrey - Volunteer Assistant
