= 1999 NCAA Division I women's volleyball tournament =

Volleyball competition

1999 NCAA women's Division I volleyball tournament
- 1999 NCAA Final Four logo
- Champions: Penn State (1st title)
- Runner-up: Stanford (8th title match)
- Semifinalists: Pacific (7th Final Four); Long Beach State (7th Final Four)
- Winning coach: Russ Rose (1st title)
- Most outstanding player: Lauren Cacciamani (Penn State)
- Final Four All-Tournament Team: Bonnie Bremner(Penn State); Carrie Schonveld (Penn State); Kerri Walsh (Stanford); Logan Tom (Stanford); Elsa Stegemenn (Pacific)

The 1999 NCAA Division I women's volleyball tournament began on December 2, 1999, with 64 teams and ended December 18 when Penn State defeated Stanford in Honolulu, Hawaii, for the program's first NCAA title.

Penn State, appearing in their third straight title match, crushed Stanford in three games to claim the school's first ever national championship. The Lions had fallen short in five games the previous two years, falling to Stanford in 1997 and Long Beach State in 1998.

== Records ==
The tournament field remained steady at 64 teams for a second straight year. The Big Ten led the way with eight bids in the 1999 NCAA Tournament, followed by the Big 12 with six bids and the Pac-10 with five bids. This was the last year to feature teams regionally seeded from 1–4. Bracket-wide seeding from 1-16 would begin in 2000. The Final Four was held in Hawaii for the first time since 1989, and has not been held outside the 48 contiguous states since.

Central Regional
Seed	School	Conference	Berth Type	Record
	Arkansas State	Sun Belt	Automatic	28-6
	Baylor	Big 12	At-large	25-8
	Cal Poly	Big West	At-large	20-8
	Cal State Sacramento	Big Sky	At-large	22-9
	Eastern Washington	Big Sky	At-large	24-7
	Hofstra	America East	Automatic	26-5
	Michigan State	Big Ten	At-large	20-12
	Minnesota	Big Ten	At-large	25-8
	Notre Dame	Big East	At-large	20-8
	Ohio State	Big Ten	At-large	16-11
1	Penn State	Big Ten	Automatic	30-1
2	Pepperdine	West Coast	Automatic	24-3
	Robert Morris	Northeast	Automatic	19-14
	Temple	Atlantic 10	Automatic	25-5
3	UCLA	Pac-10	Auto (shared)	25-3
4	USC	Pac-10	At-large	20-8

Pacific Regional
Seed	School	Conference	Berth Type	Record
	Arizona	Pac-10	At-large	19-10
	Cincinnati	Conference USA	Automatic	28-6
	Davidson	Southern	Automatic	31-3
	Florida Atlantic	Trans America	Automatic	17-12
	Houston	Conference USA	At-large	21-10
	James Madison	CAA	Automatic	26-6
	Loyola Marymount	West Coast	At-large	19-10
3	Nebraska	Big 12	Automatic	25-5
	Oral Roberts	Mid-Continent	Automatic	23-12
	San Diego	West Coast	At-large	22-5
	Santa Clara	West Coast	At-large	20-10
	Southeast Missouri State	Ohio Valley	Automatic	28-5
1	Stanford	Pac-10	Auto (shared)	26-2
4	Texas	Big 12	At-large	21-7
2	UC Santa Barbara	Big West	At-large	26-5
	Virginia	ACC	At-large	19-11

East Regional
Seed	School	Conference	Berth Type	Record
	Arizona State	Pac-10	At-large	14-12
	Ball State	MAC	Automatic	28-6
3	BYU	Mountain West	At-large	26-4
4	Clemson	ACC	At-large	31-2
	Colgate	Patriot	Automatic	17-17
	Fairfield	MAAC	Automatic	30-3
2	Florida	SEC	Automatic	30-2
	Illinois	Big Ten	At-large	16-10
	Indiana	Big Ten	At-large	19-10
	Liberty	Big South	Automatic	22-9
	Michigan	Big Ten	At-large	15-14
	Milwaukee	Midwestern Collegiate	At-large	25-3
	Northern Iowa	Missouri Valley	Automatic	28-0
1	Pacific	Big West	Automatic	28-2
	Princeton	Ivy League	Automatic	23-6
	Wisconsin	Big Ten	At-large	21-9

Mountain Regional
Seed	School	Conference	Berth Type	Record
	Arkansas	SEC	At-large	29-5
	Colorado	Big 12	At-large	18-11
3	Colorado State	Mountain West	Automatic	28-2
	Florida A&M	MEAC	Automatic	23-8
	Georgetown	Big East	Automatic	27-4
1	Hawaii	WAC	Automatic	27-1
	Kansas State	Big 12	At-large	20-8
2	Long Beach State	Big West	At-large	27-3
	Louisville	Conference USA	At-large	19-11
	Loyola (IL)	Midwestern Collegiate	Automatic	24-9
	North Carolina	ACC	Automatic	27-5
	Northern Arizona	Big Sky	Automatic	19-9
	Prairie View A&M	SWAC	Automatic	18-16
	Stephen F. Austin	Southland	Automatic	26-9
4	Texas A&M	Big 12	At-large	25-5
	Utah	Mountain West	At-large	21-9

== Central Regional (University Park) ==
First round December 2–3
1	Penn State	3
Robert Morris	0
University Park, PA
Temple	1
Baylor	3
Minnesota	3
Cal St. Sacramento	0
Los Angeles, CA
Hofstra	0
4	Southern California	3
3	UCLA	3
Eastern Washington	0
Los Angeles, CA
Ohio State	3
Notre Dame	1
Cal Poly	1
Michigan State	3
Malibu, CA
Arkansas State	0
2	Pepperdine	3

Second round December 4–5
1	Penn State	3
Baylor	0
Minnesota	3
4	Southern California	2
3	UCLA	3
Ohio State	0
Michigan State	1
2	Pepperdine	3

Regional semifinals December 9–10
1	Penn State	3
Minnesota	0
3	UCLA	3
2	Pepperdine	0

Regional finals December 11–12
1	Penn State	3
3	UCLA	0

== East Regional (Stockton) ==
First round December 2–3
1	Pacific	3
Colgate	0
Stockton, CA
Michigan	3
Fairfield	0
Northern Iowa	3
Ball State	2
Clemson, SC
Indiana	3
4	Clemson	2
3	BYU	3
Princeton	0
Orem, UT
Arizona State	0
Wisconsin	3
UW–Milwaukee	1
Illinois	3
Gainesville, FL
Liberty	0
2	Florida	3

Second round December 4–5
1	Pacific	3
Michigan	2
Northern Iowa	3
Indiana	1
3	BYU	3
Wisconsin	1
Illinois	0
2	Florida	3

Regional semifinals December 9–10
1	Pacific	3
Northern Iowa	0
3	BYU	0
2	Florida	3

Regional finals December 11–12
1	Pacific	3
2	Florida	0

== Pacific Regional (Stanford) ==
First round December 2–3
1	Stanford	3
Florida Atlantic	0
Stanford, CA
Santa Clara	3
Cincinnati	1
Arizona	3
Virginia	0
Austin, TX
Houston	0
4	Texas	3
3	Nebraska	3
Davidson	0
Lincoln, NE
James Madison	0
San Diego	3
Loyola Marymount	3
SE Missouri State	2
Santa Barbara, CA
Oral Roberts	0
2	UCSB	3

Second round December 4–5
1	Stanford	3
Santa Clara	1
Arizona	3
4	Texas	0
3	Nebraska	3
San Diego	0
Loyola Marymount	1
2	UCSB	3

Regional semifinals December 9–10
1	Stanford	3
Arizona	0
3	Nebraska	1
2	UCSB	3

Regional finals December 11–12
1	Stanford	3
2	UCSB	0

== Mountain Regional (Honolulu) ==
First round December 2–3
1	Hawaiʻi	3
Prairie View	0
Honolulu, HI
Utah	3
Colorado	0
North Carolina	3
Northern Arizona	0
College Station, TX
Stephen F. Austin	0
4	Texas A&M	3
3	Colorado State	3
Loyola (Ill.)	0
Fort Collins, CO
Louisville	0
Kansas State	3
Arkansas	3
Georgetown	1
Long Beach, CA
Florida A&M	0
2	Long Beach State	3

Second round December 4–5
1	Hawaiʻi	3
Utah	0
North Carolina	0
3	Texas A&M	3
3	Colorado State	3
Kansas State	1
Arkansas	1
2	Long Beach State	3

Regional semifinals December 9–10
1	Hawaiʻi	1
4	Texas A&M	3
3	Colorado State	1
2	Long Beach State	3

Regional finals December 11–12
4	Texas A&M	0
2	Long Beach State	3

== Final Four – Stan Sheriff Center, Honolulu, HI ==
National Semifinals; December 16
1	Penn State	3
1	Pacific	2
1	Stanford	3
2	Long Beach State	0

National Championship; December 18
1	Penn State	3
1	Stanford	0

== National Semifinals ==
=== Penn State vs. Pacific ===
Teams	Game 1	Game 2	Game 3	Game 4	Game 5
PSU	14	15	15	7	15
PAC	16	5	6	15	12

Penn State reached their third consecutive final after outlasting Pacific in five games. The Nittany Lions were paced by senior All-American Lauren Cacciamani with 26 kills, six blocks and a .304 attack percentage. Pacific was led by Elsa Stegemann who had a match high 31 kills. Pacific ended their season 32–3.

=== Stanford vs. Long Beach State ===
Teams	Game 1	Game 2	Game 3
STAN	15	15	15
LBSU	10	10	3

Behind freshman Logan Tom's 27 kills, Stanford downed defending national champion Long Beach State in three games.

Long Beach State opened the match scoring the first two points of game 1, but Stanford would control it from there, scoring eight straight points. In game 2, Stanford trailed 6-3 but took six of the next seven points to take the 9–7 lead. A service ace would seal game two for the Cardinal. Stanford dominated game 3, scoring the first 13 points before taking it 15–3.

== National Championship: Penn State vs. Stanford ==
Teams	Game 1	Game 2	Game 3
PSU	15	15	15
STAN	2	10	7

Appearing in the program's third straight title match, the top ranked Penn State Nittany Lions crushed second ranked Stanford in three sets to claim the school's first national title.

In game 1, Penn State jumped out to the 8–0 lead, before taking the first game 15–2. The Lions had 10 team blocks in game 1 alone, and hit .258 in game 1. Stanford had 19 hitting errors in the opening game.

Stanford jumped out to the 3–1 lead in game 2, but Penn State tied the game up at 6. After that, Penn State scored six straight points to take the 12–6 lead. Stanford would get no closer than three points, as Penn State took game 2 15–10.

Penn State lead 7–6 in game 3, and eventually stretched the lead to 11–6. Stanford scored their last point on a Lion hitting error, as Penn State scored the final four points. A Stanford hitting error that sailed wide sealed the national championship for Penn State, 15–7.

Penn State's Lauren Cacciamani, the co-AVCA National Player of the Year with Kerri Walsh, had 20 kills and hit .344, while Walsh hit .000 with 11 kills and 11 errors. As a team, Stanford hit negative .008 (39 kills, 40 errors) while Penn State hit .240 (48 kills, 19 errors).

After losing their first match of the season, the Nittany Lions reeled off 36 consecutive wins. The win gave Russ Rose his first NCAA title as the Penn State head coach after three previous runner-up finishes, while Stanford finished as NCAA runners-up for the fourth time in school history.

== NCAA Tournament records ==
There is one NCAA tournament record that was set in the 1999 tournament that still stands.

- Kills in a match (individual record) - Elsa Stegemann, University of the Pacific - 46 kills vs. Michigan (2nd round)
