= Terri Zemaitis =

American volleyball player (born 1976)

Personal information
- Full name: Terri Zemaitis-Boumans
- Nationality: American
- Born: April 28, 1976 (age 50)
- Height: 6 ft 2 in (188 cm)
- Spike: 122 in (309 cm)
- Block: 114 in (290 cm)

Volleyball information
- Number: 9 (national team)

National team
1998	United States

Terri Zemaitis-Boumans (born April 28, 1976) is a retired American female volleyball player. She was part of the United States women's national volleyball team at the 1998 FIVB Volleyball Women's World Championship in Japan.
