= 2009 NCAA Division I women's volleyball tournament =

Volleyball competition

2009 NCAA women's Division I volleyball tournament
- 2009 NCAA Final Four logo
- Champions: Penn State (4th title)
- Runner-up: Texas (3rd NCAA (4th national) title match)
- Semifinalists: Hawaiʻi (9th Final Four); Minnesota (3rd Final Four)
- Winning coach: Russ Rose (4th title)
- Most outstanding player: Destinee Hooker (Texas)
- Final Four All-Tournament Team: Alisha Glass (Penn St.); Megan Hodge (Penn St.); Arielle Wilson (Penn St.); Ashley Engle (Texas); Juliann Faucette (Texas); Hailey Cowles (Minnesota)

The 2009 NCAA Division I women's volleyball tournament began on December 3, 2009 with 64 teams and ended on December 19, when Penn State defeated Texas, 3-2, in the NCAA National Championship match. With the win, Penn State won its fourth overall title, and became the first team in the history of women's intercollegiate volleyball to win three straight national titles. Penn State also became the first team in NCAA history to have two straight undefeated seasons, as the 2009 squad went 38-0 for the second straight year, extending the ongoing NCAA record of consecutive matches won (102).

Penn State became only the third team in NCAA history to win the national championship after trailing 0-2 in sets. The last team to accomplish the feat was UCLA in 1991.

Penn State's senior class, led by Megan Hodge and Alisha Glass, had an overall record of 142-5 (.966 winning %), which is the best winning percentage in NCAA Division I history for classes that have won national titles. Penn State hit .381 for the season, the second-best Division I team hitting percentage mark in the rally scoring era. It only trails the mark of .390 set by the 2008 Penn State squad.

Texas's Destinee Hooker, the Most Outstanding Player of the 2009 Final Four, broke the record of kills in an NCAA championship match, as she had a career high 34 kills in the final.

== Records ==
Gainesville Regional
Seed	School	Conference	Berth Type	RPI	Record
	Army	Patriot	Automatic	101	26-5
	Baylor	Big 12	At-large	33	22-9
	Binghamton	America East	Automatic	177	15-15
9	California	Pac-10	At-large	10	18-10
	Cincinnati	Big East	At-large	43	25-10
	College of Charleston	Southern	Automatic	92	18-12
	FIU	Sun Belt	At-large	15	31-3
16	Florida	SEC	At-large	14	23-5
	Georgia Tech	ACC	At-large	45	21-9
	Lipscomb	Atlantic Sun	Automatic	34	28-3
	Long Beach State	Big West	Automatic	39	22-8
	Miami (FL)	ACC	At-large	42	18-12
	Ohio State	Big Ten	At-large	29	24-9
	Penn	Ivy League	Automatic	89	22-5
1	Penn State	Big Ten	Automatic	2	32-0
8	UCLA	Pac-10	At-large	9	23-8

Minneapolis Regional
Seed	School	Conference	Berth Type	RPI	Record
	Alabama A&M	SWAC	Automatic	237	22-12
	Clemson	ACC	At-large	58	23-9
	Colorado State	Mountain West	Automatic	23	23-5
	Duke	ACC	At-large	30	27-5
	Florida A&M	MEAC	Automatic	132	17-8
3	Florida State	ACC	Automatic	3	28-2
	Jacksonville State	OVC	Automatic	85	26-7
	Kentucky	SEC	At-large	26	27-4
	Louisville	Big East	Automatic	38	21-10
	Michigan State	Big Ten	At-large	41	17-15
	Middle Tennessee	Sun Belt	Automatic	31	25-9
11	Minnesota	Big Ten	At-large	8	24-8
	Northern Colorado	Big Sky	Automatic	98	21-11
14	Oregon	Pac-10	At-large	21	19-9
	Tennessee	SEC	At-large	17	23-7
6	Washington	Pac-10	At-large	7	23-5

Stanford Regional
Seed	School	Conference	Berth Type	RPI	Record
	Dayton	Atlantic 10	Automatic	19	29-3
12	Hawaiʻi	WAC	Automatic	18	27-2
5	Illinois	Big Ten	At-large	4	24-5
	IPFW	Summit	Automatic	127	20-11
	Long Island	Northeast	Automatic	184	21-13
13	Michigan	Big Ten	At-large	11	24-9
	Milwaukee	Horizon	Automatic	139	16-14
	New Mexico	Mountain West	At-large	44	20-9
	Niagara	MAAC	Automatic	150	23-8
	Notre Dame	Big East	At-large	20	21-6
	Ohio	MAC	Automatic	27	26-6
	Oklahoma	Big 12	At-large	49	18-11
	St. Mary's (Cal.)	West Coast	Automatic	36	22-4
4	Stanford	Pac-10	Automatic	5	21-7
	UC Santa Barbara	Big West	At-large	48	22-7
	USC	Pac-10	At-large	21	21-9

Omaha Regional
Seed	School	Conference	Berth Type	RPI	Record
	Arizona	Pac-10	At-large	25	19-10
	Coastal Carolina	Big South	Automatic	133	20-13
	George Mason	Colonial	Automatic	60	23-8
7	Iowa State	Big 12	At-large	6	25-4
15	LSU	SEC	Automatic	13	24-6
10	Nebraska	Big 12	At-large	12	23-6
	Northern Iowa	Missouri Valley	Automatic	16	30-2
	Rice	Conference USA	Automatic	32	23-8
	Saint Louis	Atlantic 10	At-large	24	24-7
	TCU	Mountain West	At-large	37	26-6
2	Texas	Big 12	Automatic	1	24-1
	Texas A&M	Big 12	At-large	40	18-10
	Texas State	Southland	Automatic	106	22-12
	Tulane	Conference USA	At-large	35	18-9
	Washington State	Pac-10	At-large	55	18-12
	Wichita State	Missouri Valley	At-large	28	25-6

== Gainesville Regional ==
First round December 3–5
1	Penn State	3
Binghamton	0
University Park, PA
Army	1
Penn	3
Miami (FL)	2
Florida International	3
Gainesville, FL
College of Charleston	0
16	Florida	3
9	California	3
Lipscomb	0
Columbus, OH
Cincinnati	0
Ohio State	3
Georgia Tech	0
Baylor	3
Los Angeles, CA
Long Beach State	0
8	UCLA	3

Second round December 4–6
1	Penn State	3
Penn	0
FIU	0
16	Florida	3
9	California	3
Ohio State	1
Baylor	3
8	UCLA	1

Regional semifinals December 11
1	Penn State	3
16	Florida	0
9	California	3
Baylor	0

Regional finals December 12
1	Penn State	3
9	California	0

Gainesville all-tournament team

Megan Hodge Penn State (MVP)

Kelly Murphy Florida

Callie Rivers Florida

Blair Brown Penn State

Darcy Dorton Penn State

Alisha Glass Penn State

Arielle Wilson Penn State

== Stanford Regional ==
First round December 3–5
5	Illinois	3
IPFW	0
Champaign, IL
Milwaukee	2
Dayton	3
Southern California	3
Oklahoma	0
Los Angeles, CA
New Mexico	0
12	Hawaiʻi	3
13	Michigan	3
Niagara	0
Ann Arbor, MI
Ohio	3
Notre Dame	2
St. Mary's (CA)	3
UC Santa Barbara	2
Palo Alto, CA
Long Island	0
4	Stanford	3

Second round December 4–6
5	Illinois	3
Dayton	1
Southern California	1
12	Hawaiʻi	3
13	Michigan	3
Ohio	2
St. Mary's (CA)	2
4	Stanford	3

Regional semifinals December 11
5	Illinois	1
12	Hawaiʻi	3
13	Michigan	3
4	Stanford	1

Regional finals December 12
12	Hawaiʻi	3
13	Michigan	0

Stanford region all-tournament team

Kanani Danielson Hawaii (MVP)

Amber Kaufman Hawaii

Stephanie Ferrell Hawaii

Alex Hunt Michigan

Lexi Zimmerman Michigan

Alix Klineman Stanford

Cassidy Lichtman Stanford

== Minneapolis Regional ==
First round December 3–5
3	Florida State	3
Alabama A&M	0
Tallahassee, FL
Florida A&M	2
Jacksonville State	3
Kentucky	3
Michigan State	0
Lexington, KY
Clemson	0
14	Oregon	3
11	Minnesota	3
Louisville	1
Knoxville, TN
Duke	1
Tennessee	3
Colorado State	3
Middle Tennessee State	2
Fort Collins, CO
Northern Colorado	1
6	Washington	3

Second round December 4–6
3	Florida State	3
Jacksonville State	0
Kentucky	3
14	Oregon	0
11	Minnesota	3
Tennessee	0
Colorado State	3
6	Washington	1

Regional semifinals December 11
3	Florida State	3
Kentucky	2
11	Minnesota	3
Colorado State	1

Regional finals December 12
3	Florida State	1
11	Minnesota	3

Minneapolis region all-tournament team

Hailey Cowles Minnesota (MVP)

Mira Djuric Florida State

Rachael Morgan Florida State

Stephanie Neville Florida State

Taylor Carico Minnesota

Lauren Gibbemeyer Minnesota

Christine Tan Minnesota

== Omaha Regional ==
First round December 3–5
7	Iowa State	3
George Mason	0
Ames, IA
Wichita State	3
St. Louis	0
Washington State	0
Northern Iowa	3
Lincoln, NE
Coastal Carolina	0
10	Nebraska	3
15	LSU	3
Tulane	0
Baton Rouge, LA
Arizona	1
Texas A&M	3
TCU	3
Rice	0
Austin, TX
Texas State	0
2	Texas	3

Second round December 4–6
7	Iowa State	3
Wichita State	0
Northern Iowa	0
10	Nebraska	3
15	LSU	2
Texas A&M	3
TCU	0
2	Texas	3

Regional semifinals December 11
7	Iowa State	0
10	Nebraska	3
Texas A&M	0
2	Texas	3

Regional finals December 12
10	Nebraska	1
2	Texas	3

Omaha region all-tournament team

Destinee Hooker Texas (MVP)

Rachael Hockaday Iowa State

Kayla Banwarth Nebraska

Lindsey Licht Nebraska

Ashley Engle Texas

Julianne Faucette Texas

Heather Kisner Texas

== Final Four – St. Pete Times Forum, Tampa, Florida ==
National Semifinals; December 17
1	Penn State	3
12	Hawaiʻi	1
11	Minnesota	0
2	Texas	3

National Championship; December 19
1	Penn State	3
2	Texas	2
