= Arizona Wildcats women's volleyball =

American college volleyball team

- University: University of Arizona
- Athletic director: Desiree Reed-Francois
- Head coach: Charita Stubbs (4th season)
- Conference: Big 12
- Location: Tucson, Arizona, US
- Home arena: McKale Center (capacity: 14,688)
- Nickname: Wildcats
- Colors: Cardinal and navy

AIAW/NCAA tournament semifinal
- 2001

AIAW/NCAA tournament appearance
- 1981, 1982, 1983, 1984, 1985, 1986, 1987, 1988, 1989, 1993, 1994, 1996, 1997, 1998, 1999, 2000, 2001, 2002, 2003, 2004, 2005, 2009, 2010, 2011, 2013, 2014, 2015, 2016, 2018

Conference regular season champion
- Intermountain Athletic Conference; 1978 Pac-10; 2000

The Arizona Wildcats women's volleyball team represents University of Arizona in the Big 12 Conference. They are currently led by head coach Charita Stubbs and play their home games at McKale Center.

== Notable players ==
- Melissa McLinden – First Team All-American (1985), 1988 indoor volleyball Olympian, All-Pac-West Conference (1985), University of Arizona Sports Hall of Fame (1991)
- Caren Kemner – Three-time indoor volleyball Olympian (1988, 1992, 1996), University of Arizona Sports Hall of Fame (1992)
- Dana Burkholder – Two time First Team All-American (2000, 2001), Pac-10 Player of the Year (2000), three-time All-Pac-10 (1999, 2000, 2001), University of Arizona Sports Hall of Fame (2006)
- Jill Talbot – First Team All-American (2001)
- Kim Glass – First Team All-American (2005), 2008 indoor volleyball Olympian, holds Arizona’s single season records in kills (650), attempts (1,584), AVCA National Freshman of the Year (2002), Pac-10 Freshman of the Year (2002), four-time All-Pac-10 (2002, 2003, 2004, 2005), University of Arizona Sports Hall of Fame (2011)
- Sofia Maldonado Diaz – Pac-12 Freshman of the Year (2020/2021), All-Pac-12 (2021)

=== Wildcats in the Olympics ===
Three Arizona Wildcats women's volleyball players have represented one countries five total times in volleyball in the Summer Olympics:

Year	Player	Country	Location	Medal or placement
1988	Melissa McLinden	United States	Seoul	7th
1988	Caren Kemner	United States	Seoul	7th
1992	Caren Kemner	United States	Barcelona	Bronze
1996	Caren Kemner	United States	Atlanta	7th
2008	Kim Glass	United States	Beijing	Silver
U of A Olympians

== Season-by-season results ==
Arizona has appeared in 29 NCAA tournament since its inception in 1981. Arizona has appeared in the final four 1 time, in 2001.

== Results by season ==
Record table
Season	Coach	Overall	Conference	Standing	Postseason
Kathryn Russell (Intermountain Conference of College Women Physical Education) (1974–1976)
1974	Kathryn Russell	18–3	10–2	2nd	
1975	Kathryn Russell	19–12	12–1	2nd	
1976	Kathryn Russell	21–4	10–2	2nd	
Kathryn Russell:		58–19	32–5		
Rosie Wegrich (Intermountain Conference of College Women Physical Education) (1977–1979)
1977	Rosie Wegrich	17–12–1	14–8	3rd	AIAW
1978	Rosie Wegrich	28–15–3	11–1	1st	AIAW
1979	Rosie Wegrich	28–15–3	11–1	1st	AIAW
Rosie Wegrich (Western Collegiate Athletic Association) (1980–1984)
1980	Rosie Wegrich	20–17	6–6	4th	
1981	Rosie Wegrich	21–17	5–7	4th	NCAA First Round
1982	Rosie Wegrich	22–16	5–9	6th	NCAA Second Round
1983	Rosie Wegrich	17–15	7–7	5th	NCAA Second Round
1984	Rosie Wegrich	16–12	6–8	5th	NCAA First Round
Rosie Wegrich (Pacific West Conference) (1985–1986)
1985	Rosie Wegrich	17–13	1–7	5th	NCAA Second Round
1986	Rosie Wegrich	14–15	9–9	6th	NCAA First Round
Rosie Wegrich (Pac-10 Conference) (1987–1991)
1987	Rosie Wegrich	18–13	9–9	6th	NCAA First Round
1988	Rosie Wegrich	19–14	9–9	5th	NCAA First Round
1989	Rosie Wegrich	18–13	8–10	6th	NCAA Second Round
1990	Rosie Wegrich	18–13	8–10	T-5th	
1991	Rosie Wegrich	4–26	0–18	10th	
Rosie Wegrich:		256–222–3	109–119		
Dave Rubio (Pac-10) (1992–2010)
1992	Dave Rubio	10–17	4–14	8th	
1993	Dave Rubio	20–11	11–7	T-4th	NCAA Sweet Sixteen
1994	Dave Rubio	17–10	10–8	5th	NCAA Sweet Sixteen
1995	Dave Rubio	14–14	6–12	T-7th	
1996	Dave Rubio	20–10	10–8	5th	NCAA Second Round
1997	Dave Rubio	20–7	12–6	T-4th	NCAA First Round
1998	Dave Rubio	22–7	12–6	4th	NCAA Second Round
1999	Dave Rubio	21–11	12–6	4th	NCAA Sweet Sixteen
2000	Dave Rubio	28–5	16–2	T-1st	NCAA Elite Eight
2001	Dave Rubio	25–5	14–4	3rd	NCAA Final Four
2002	Dave Rubio	20–12	11–7	T-3rd	NCAA Elite Eight
2003	Dave Rubio	17–15	10–8	T-5th	NCAA First Round
2004	Dave Rubio	19–11	10–8	6th	NCAA Second Round
2005	Dave Rubio	25–6	14–4	T-2nd	NCAA Elite Eight
2006	Dave Rubio	13–17	4–14	8th	
2007	Dave Rubio	14–17	4–14	8th	
2008	Dave Rubio	16–14	4–14	7th	
2009	Dave Rubio	19–11	8–10	7th	NCAA First Round
2010	Dave Rubio	20–12	9–9	6th	NCAA First Round
Dave Rubio (Pac-12 Conference) (2011–2022)
2011	Dave Rubio	19–13	11–11	7th	NCAA First Round
2012	Dave Rubio	16–15	8–12	8th	
2013	Dave Rubio	21–13	10–10	T-5th	NCAA Second Round
2014	Dave Rubio	24–10	12–8	3rd	NCAA Second Round
2015	Dave Rubio	19–14	9–11	7th	NCAA First Round
2016	Dave Rubio	20–15	10–10	T-7th	NCAA Sweet Sixteen
2017	Dave Rubio	11–18	5–15	10th	
2018	Dave Rubio	22–11	11–9	5th	NCAA First Round
2019	Dave Rubio	15–17	5–15	T-9th	
2020	Dave Rubio	10–11	10–11	6th	
2021	Dave Rubio	17–16	8–12	8th	NIVC Second Round
2022	Dave Rubio	16–15	6–14	10th	
Dave Rubio:		570–380	286–299		
Charita Stubbs (Pac-12) (2023–2023)
2023	Charita Stubbs	8–23	3–17	12th	
Charita Stubbs (Big 12 Conference) (2024–present)
2024	Charita Stubbs	24–9	9–9	7th	NIVC Champions
2025	Charita Stubbs	17–13	10–8	T-6th	NCAA Second Round
2026	Charita Stubbs	0–0	0–0		
Charita Stubbs:		49–48	22–34		
Total:		934–672–7			
National champion Postseason invitational champion Conference regular season champion Conference regular season and conference tournament champion Division regular season champion Division regular season and conference tournament champion Conference tournament champion

=== Conference records ===
Years	Conferences	Win–loss	Pct.
1974–1979	Intermountain Conference	59—24	(.711)
1980–1984	WCAA	29–37	(.439)
1985–1986	Pacific-West	10–16	(.385)
1987–2011	Pacific-10 Conference	226–300	(.430)
2011–2023	Pac-12 Conference	97–144	(.402)
2024–present	Big 12 Conference	19–17	(.528)
Total	All conferences	440–544	(.447)

=== Record vs. Big 12 opponents ===
The Arizona Wildcats lead the all-time series regardless of conference affiliation vs. eleven other Big 12 opponents, trailing only BYU, Iowa State and TCU. Oklahoma State does not field a volleyball team.

Opponent	Wins	Losses	Ties	Pct.	Streak
Arizona State	58	57	0	(.504)	Arizona State 6
Baylor	3	0	0	(1.000)	Arizona 3
BYU	14	17	0	(.452)	BYU 1
Cincinnati	2	0	0	(1.000)	Arizona 2
Colorado	16	12	0	(.571)	Colorado 1
Houston	9	1	0	(.900)	Arizona 7
Iowa State	1	2	0	(.333)	Iowa State 1
Kansas	2	1	0	(.667)	Kansas 1
Kansas State	3	2	0	(.600)	Arizona 1
TCU	1	2	0	(.333)	Arizona 1
Texas Tech	9	0	1	(.950)	Arizona 9
UCF	3	0	0	(1.000)	Arizona 3
Utah	27	19	0	(.587)	Utah 1
West Virginia	3	0	0	(1.000)	Arizona 2

- Total (148–113–1, .567)
- Note all-time series includes non-conference matchups.

== See also ==
- List of NCAA Division I women's volleyball programs
