= San Diego State Aztecs women's volleyball =

College women's volleyball team

- Founded: 1976
- University: San Diego State University
- Head coach: Brent Hilliard (5th season)
- Conference: Pac-12
- Location: San Diego, California
- Home arena: Aztec Court at Peterson Gymnasium (capacity: 2,169)
- Nickname: Aztecs
- Colors: Scarlet and black

AIAW/NCAA tournament semifinal
- 1981, 1982

AIAW/NCAA Regional Final
- 1981, 1982, 1983

AIAW/NCAA tournament appearance
- 1981, 1982, 1983, 1984, 1985, 1986, 1988, 1989, 1990, 1994, 1995, 1996, 2001, 2012

Conference regular season champion
- Mountain West; 2012; WAC; 1995

The San Diego State Aztecs women's volleyball team is the women's volleyball program that represents San Diego State University (SDSU). The Aztecs compete in NCAA Division I as a member of the Pac-12 Conference. The team plays its home games on Aztec Court at Peterson Gymnasium.

== Postseason ==
Year	Round	Opponent	Result
1981	Regional semifinals Regional Finals; Semifinals	New Mexico; UC Santa Barbara; UCLA	W 3–0; W 3–0; L 1–3
1982	Regional semifinals Regional Finals; Semifinals	Cal; UCLA; USC	W 3–1; W 3–1; L 0–3
1983	First round Regional semifinals Regional Finals	Colorado State; Arizona; Stanford	W 3–0; W 3–1; L 0–3
1984	First round Regional semifinals	BYU; USC	W 3–0; L 0–3
1985	First round	Hawaii	L 1–3
1986	First round Regional semifinals	UC Santa Barbara; Pacific	W 3–1; L 0–3
1988	First round Regional semifinals	San Jose State; Hawaii	W 3–1; L 0–3
1989	First round	Long Beach State	L 0–3
1990	First round Regional semifinals	BYU; Stanford	W 3–1; L 1–3
1994	First round Second round	Memphis; Arizona State	W 3–1; L 2–3
1995	Second round Regional semifinals	Long Beach State; Michigan State	W 3–1; L 0–3
1996	First round Second round	Sam Houston State; Texas	W 3–1; L 0–3
2001	First round	Long Beach State	L 0–3
2012	First round	Saint Mary's	L 2–3

== Head coaches ==
As of September 2, 2025.

Head Coach	Seasons	Overall	Pct.
Rudy Suwara	1979–1991	431–206	.677
Myles Gabel	1992–1994	67–30	.691
Mark Warner	1995–2008	211–212	.499
Deitre Collins-Parker	2009–2019	171–162	.514
Brent Hilliard	2020–present	54–81	.400

== See also ==
- Aztec Hall of Fame
