= Colorado Buffaloes women's volleyball =

College women's volleyball team

- Founded: 1986; 40 years ago
- University: University of Colorado Boulder
- Athletic director: Fernando Lovo
- Head coach: Jesse Mahoney (11th season)
- Conference: Big 12
- Location: Boulder, Colorado
- Home arena: CU Events Center (capacity: 11,064)
- Nickname: Buffaloes
- Colors: Silver, black, and gold

AIAW/NCAA regional semifinal
- 1993, 1994, 1997, 2017

AIAW/NCAA tournament appearance
- 1989, 1991, 1992, 1993, 1994, 1995, 1996, 1997, 1998, 1999, 2000, 2001, 2003, 2004, 2005, 2006, 2013, 2014, 2017, 2018, 2022, 2025

Conference tournament champion
- 1992, 1993

Conference regular season champion
- 1993

The Colorado Buffaloes volleyball team is the intercollegiate women's volleyball team of the University of Colorado Boulder. They compete in the Big 12 Conference and play their home games at the CU Events Center.

== History ==
The volleyball program at the University of Colorado began in 1986. The Buffaloes' first head coach was Brad Saindon, who Mike McLean replaced after three seasons. In McLean's first season, Colorado made its first NCAA tournament appearance. Partway through the 1990 season, Saindon returned as Colorado's head coach. In his second tenure, Saindon led the Buffaloes to two Big Eight championships, two in the tournament and one in the regular season; six NCAA tournament and two semifinal appearances.

Pi'i Aiu took over as head coach starting in 1997. He became the winningest volleyball coach at Colorado, leading the Buffaloes to a 22–9 record and a semifinal appearance in the NCAA tournament. The Buffaloes made nine NCAA tournament appearances during his tenure. Aiu was dismissed as Colorado's head coach on January 12, 2009, following two straight losing seasons.

Following Aiu's dismissal, Liz Kritza was hired to become the head coach of the Buffaloes. She led Colorado to two NCAA tournament appearances. Despite the Buffaloes' record of 57–41 in her last three seasons, Kritza was dismissed after the conclusion of the 2015 season.

Jesse Mahoney became the head coach of the Buffaloes on December 17, 2015. As of the 2025 season, he has led Colorado to another semifinal appearance and four NCAA tournament appearances.

== Head coaches ==
- Brad Saindon (1986–1988, 1990–1996)
- Mike McLean (1989–1990)
- Pi'i Aiu (1997–2008)
- Liz Kritza (2009–2015)
- Jesse Mahoney (2016–present)

== Season-by-season results ==
Record table
| Season | Coach | Overall | Conference | Standing | Postseason |
|---|---|---|---|---|---|
Brad Saindon (Big Eight Conference) (1986–1988)
| 1986 | Brad Saindon | 6–18 | | | |
| 1987 | Brad Saindon | 9–20 | 3–9 | T–5th | |
| 1988 | Brad Saindon | 22–13 | 8–4 | 3rd | |
| Brad Saindon: | | 37–51 (.420) | 11–13 (.458) | | |
Mike McLean (Big Eight Conference) (1989–1990)
| 1989 | Mike McLean | 22–11 | 10–2 | 2nd | NCAA First Round |
| 1990 (Note: Until October 6.) | Mike McLean | 8–8 | 1–0 | — | |
| Mike McLean: | | 30–19 (.612) | 11–2 (.846) | | |
Brad Saindon (Big Eight Conference) (1990–1995)
| 1990 (Note: From October 12.) | Brad Saindon | 12–7 | 8–3 | 2nd | |
| 1991 | Brad Saindon | 25–10 | 10–2 | 2nd | NCAA First Round |
| 1992 | Brad Saindon | 22–9 | 10–2 | 2nd | NCAA First Round |
| 1993 | Brad Saindon | 26–6 | 11–1 | 1st | NCAA Semifinals |
| 1994 | Brad Saindon | 23–8 | 10–2 | 2nd | NCAA Semifinals |
| 1995 | Brad Saindon | 17–11 | 8–4 | 2nd | NCAA First Round |
Brad Saindon (Big 12 Conference) (1996–1996)
| 1996 | Brad Saindon | 19–10 | 13–7 | T–3rd | NCAA Second Round |
| Brad Saindon: | | 144–61 (.702) | 70–21 (.769) | | |
Pi'i Aiu (Big 12 Conference) (1997–2008)
| 1997 | Pi'i Aiu | 22–9 | 16–4 | T–2nd | NCAA Semifinals |
| 1998 | Pi'i Aiu | 22–8 | 14–6 | 3rd | NCAA Second Round |
| 1999 | Pi'i Aiu | 18–12 | 12–8 | 6th | NCAA First Round |
| 2000 | Pi'i Aiu | 17–12 | 12–8 | T–5th | NCAA Second Round |
| 2001 | Pi'i Aiu | 19–11 | 13–7 | 4th | NCAA Second Round |
| 2002 | Pi'i Aiu | 15–15 | 9–11 | T–7th | |
| 2003 | Pi'i Aiu | 21–10 | 13–7 | T–3rd | NCAA First Round |
| 2004 | Pi'i Aiu | 14–14 | 9–11 | T–6th | NCAA First Round |
| 2005 | Pi'i Aiu | 15–13 | 10–10 | 5th | NCAA First Round |
| 2006 | Pi'i Aiu | 17–12 | 12–8 | T–4th | NCAA Second Round |
| 2007 | Pi'i Aiu | 6–22 | 1–19 | T–10th | |
| 2008 | Pi'i Aiu | 13–17 | 7–13 | T–8th | |
| Pi'i Aiu: | | 199–155 (.562) | 128–112 (.533) | | |
Liz Kritza (Big 12 Conference) (2009–2010)
| 2009 | Liz Kritza | 7–22 | 2–18 | T–10th | |
| 2010 | Liz Kritza | 6–20 | 3–17 | 10th | |
Liz Kritza (Pac-12 Conference) (2011–2015)
| 2011 | Liz Kritza | 6–24 | 1–21 | 12th | |
| 2012 | Liz Kritza | 14–18 | 4–16 | T–10th | |
| 2013 | Liz Kritza | 18–14 | 9–11 | T–7th | NCAA Second Round |
| 2014 | Liz Kritza | 20–14 | 11–9 | T–4th | NCAA Second Round |
| 2015 | Liz Kritza | 19–13 | 11–9 | 5th | |
| Liz Kritza: | | 90–125 (.419) | 41–101 (.289) | | |
Jesse Mahoney (Pac-12 Conference) (2016–2023)
| 2016 | Jesse Mahoney | 14–16 | 6–14 | 9th | |
| 2017 | Jesse Mahoney | 24–10 | 12–8 | 5th | NCAA Semifinals |
| 2018 | Jesse Mahoney | 18–14 | 10–10 | T–6th | NCAA First Round |
| 2019 | Jesse Mahoney | 13–17 | 5–15 | T–9th | |
| 2020 (Note: Played in Spring 2021 on a conference-only schedule due to the COVID-19 pandemic.) | Jesse Mahoney | 8–12 | 8–12 | 8th | |
| 2021 | Jesse Mahoney | 15–14 | 6–14 | 10th | |
| 2022 | Jesse Mahoney | 20–11 | 12–8 | 5th | NCAA First Round |
| 2023 | Jesse Mahoney | 16–15 | 8–12 | 7th | |
Jesse Mahoney (Big 12 Conference) (2024–present)
| 2024 | Jesse Mahoney | 13–17 | 6–12 | 10th | |
| 2025 | Jesse Mahoney | 23–9 | 12–6 | T–3rd | NCAA Second Round |
| Jesse Mahoney: | | 164–135 (.548) | 85–111 (.434) | | |
| Total: | | 661–552 (.545) | | | |
National champion Postseason invitational champion Conference regular season champion Conference regular season and conference tournament champion Division regular season champion Division regular season and conference tournament champion Conference tournament champion

== Postseason ==
The Colorado Buffaloes have made 22 NCAA tournament appearances, including four regional semifinal appearances. The Buffaloes have a record of 14–22 in the postseason.

| Year | Round | Opponent | Result |
|---|---|---|---|
| 1989 | First round | Minnesota | L 0–3 |
| 1991 | First round | Penn State | L 2–3 |
| 1992 | First round | Nebraska | L 1–3 |
| 1993 | Second round Regional semifinals | Illinois; Penn State | W 3–0; L 2–3 |
| 1994 | Second round Regional semifinals | Northern Iowa; Nebraska | W 3–1; L 0–3 |
| 1995 | First round | Northern Iowa | L 0–3 |
| 1996 | First round Second round | Oral Roberts; Hawaii | W 3–1; L 0–3 |
| 1997 | First round Second round Regional semifinals | Tennessee Tech; Oral Roberts; Stanford | W 3–0; W 3–2; L 0–3 |
| 1998 | First round Second round | San Jose; Illinois | W 3–0; L 1–3 |
| 1999 | First round | Utah | L 0–3 |
| 2000 | First round Second round | Georgia Tech; Colorado State | W 3–1; L 2–3 |
| 2001 | First round Second round | American; Colorado State | W 3–0; L 2–3 |
| 2003 | First round | Michigan | L 0–3 |
| 2004 | First round | Hawaii | L 1–3 |
| 2005 | First round | Colorado State | L 1–3 |
| 2006 | First round Second round | New Mexico State; Washington | W 3–0; L 0–3 |
| 2013 | First round Second round | Iowa State; Minnesota | W 3–1; L 2–3 |
| 2014 | First round Second round | Northern Colorado; Colorado State | W 3–1; L 2–3 |
| 2017 | First round Second round Regional semifinals | James Madison; Baylor; Nebraska | W 3–0; W 3–0; L 0–3 |
| 2018 | First round | South Carolina | L 2–3 |
| 2022 | First round | Rice | L 1–3 |
| 2025 | First round Second round | American; Indiana | W 3–0; L 0–3 |

== Facilities ==
The Buffaloes play their home games at the CU Events Center on the campus of the University of Colorado in Boulder. Previously, they played in the Balch Fieldhouse from 1986 to most of the 1987 season.

Top home attendance figures
| Rank | Attendance | Opponent | Result | Date |
|---|---|---|---|---|
| 1 | 4,883 | UNLV | L, 1–3 | August 25, 2023 |
| 2 | 4,111 | Nebraska | W, 3–2 | November 11, 2006 |
| 3 | 3,708 | Nebraska | L, 0–3 | October 6, 2007 |
| 4 | 3,695 | Colorado State | W, 3–2 | September 16, 2022 |
| 5 | 3,685 | Nebraska | L, 0–3 | November 16, 1994 |
| 6 | 3,367 | Nebraska | L, 0–3 | November 25, 1999 |
| 7 | 3,117 | Arizona State | W, 3–2 | October 12, 2012 |
| 8 | 2,987 | Nebraska | L, 0–3 | September 19, 2001 |
| 9 | 2,973 | Nebraska | L, 0–3 | November 13, 2010 |
| 10 | 2,906 | Nebraska | L, 0–3 | September 27, 1995 |
| 11 | 2,879 | Nebraska | L, 2–3 | November 4, 1992 |
| 12 | 2,851 | Arizona | L, 1–3 | October 14, 2012 |
| 13 | 2,846 | Stanford | L, 2–3 | October 17, 2014 |
| 14 | 2,843 | Texas | L, 2–3 | September 3, 1989 |
| 15 | 2,817 | Nebraska | W, 3–1 | October 29, 2008 |
