= John Cook (coach) =

American volleyball coach (born 1956)

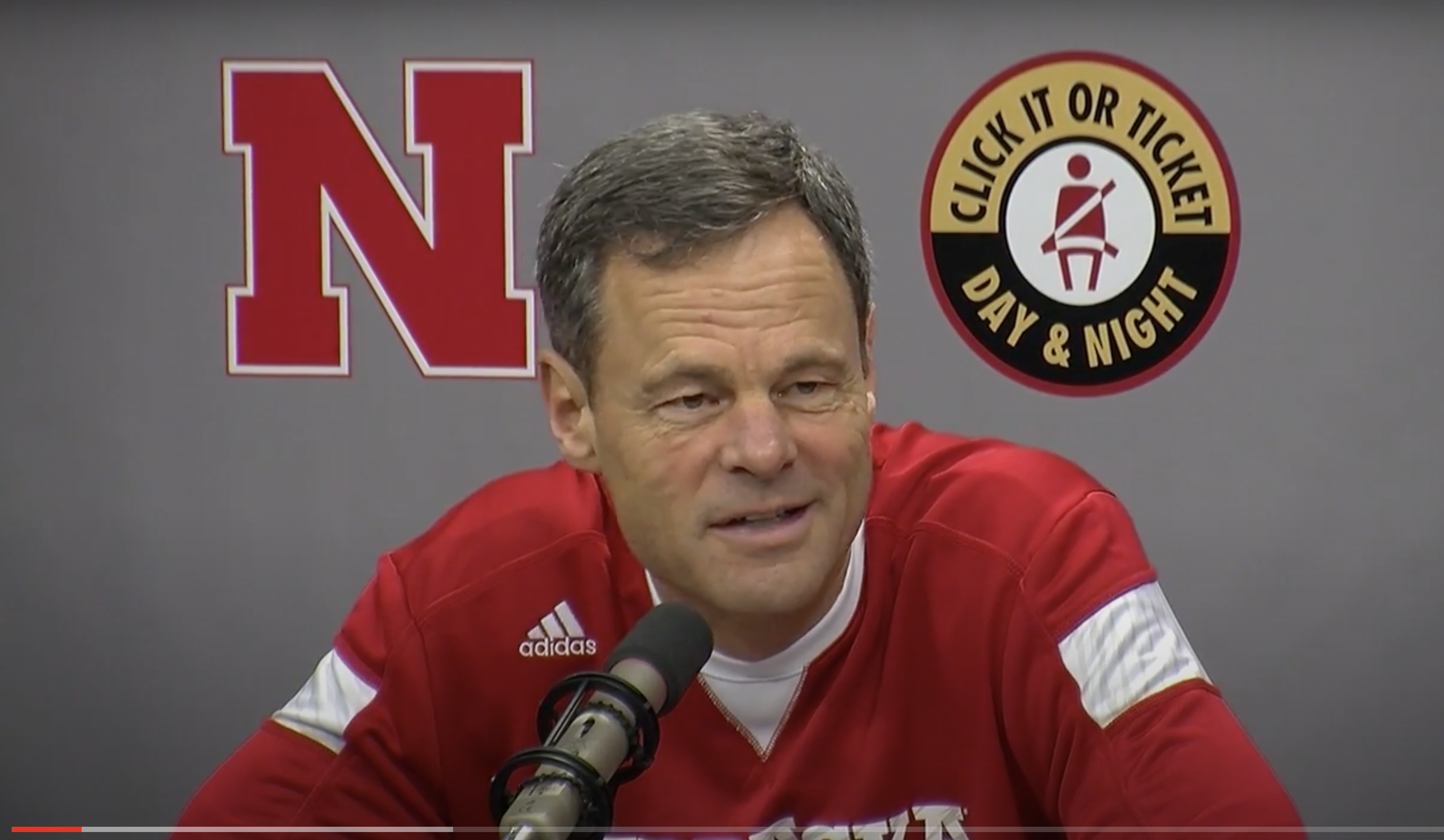
- Cook in 2014

Biographical details
- Born: April 19, 1956 (age 70); Chula Vista, California, U.S.
- Education: San Diego

Coaching career (HC unless noted)
- 1981–1988: Francis Parker HS
- 1983–1984: UC San Diego (asst.)
- 1989–1991: Nebraska (asst.)
- 1992–1998: Wisconsin
- 1999: Nebraska (Assoc. HC)
- 2000–2024: Nebraska

National
- 1992: USA (asst.)

Head coaching record
- Overall: 883–176 (.834)

Accomplishments and honors

Championships
- 4x NCAA Division I (2000, 2006, 2015, 2017) 9x Big 12 (2000-2002, 2004-2008, 2010) 6x Big Ten (1997, 2011, 2016, 2017, 2023, 2024)

Awards
- 3x AVCA National Coach of the Year (2000, 2005, 2023) 6x AVCA Region Coach of the Year (1997, 2000, 2005, 2008, 2016, 2023); 4x Big Ten Coach of the Year (1997, 2016, 2017, 2023); 4x Big 12 Coach of the Year (2001, 2005, 2008, 2010); Volleyball Magazine Coach of the Year (2008); USA Volleyball All-Time Great Coach Award (2008) AVCA Hall of Fame (2017)

John G. Cook (born April 19, 1956) is a retired American volleyball coach who served as the head coach of the Nebraska Cornhuskers women's college volleyball team from 2000 to 2024. In twenty-five seasons at Nebraska, He led the Cornhuskers to four national championships (2000, 2006, 2015, 2017) and fifteen conference titles. Prior to Nebraska, Cook served as head coach of the Wisconsin Badgers for seven seasons. He earned his 800th career win in 2022, and ranks twelfth all-time in coaching wins in major college volleyball history. Cook is a three-time AVCA National Coach of the Year.

== Early life ==
Cook was born and raised in Chula Vista, California. He attended Francis Parker School in San Diego, where he excelled on the basketball team. He went on to play college basketball for the San Diego Toreros, but left the team when the program moved up to NCAA Division I. Cook graduated from the University of San Diego in 1979, earning a bachelor's degree in history. He received a master's degree in teaching and coaching effectiveness from San Diego State University in 1991.

== Coaching career ==
=== Early career ===
After finishing his undergraduate degree, Cook took a job teaching geography at his high school alma mater Francis Parker School, a private institution in San Diego. The job required him to coach three girls' sports — basketball, softball, and volleyball, as well as Parker's junior high boys basketball team – in addition to his teaching duties. According to ESPN journalist Elizabeth Merrill, "he knew little about volleyball, and had to read books to get a grasp on the basics." Cook proved a quick learner; he had a 162–18 record in six seasons as Parker's volleyball coach, which included a ninety-match winning streak and two state championships.

While still coaching at Parker, Cook served as the head assistant coach at UC San Diego in 1983 and 1984, where he aided the Tritons to a second-place national finish in 1983 and an NCAA Division III national championship the next year. He was hired as an assistant coach at Nebraska in 1989.

=== Wisconsin ===
Cook was hired as Wisconsin's fifth full-time head coach in 1992, and three years later won the program's second National Invitational Volleyball Championship. He was named Big Ten Co-Coach of the Year and AVCA District 2 Coach of the Year after leading the Badgers to a share of the 1997 Big Ten title and school-record 30–3 record. The Badgers advanced to a postseason tournament in each of Cook's final six years at the school, including five NCAA Division I tournament appearances. Cook coached four All-Americans, nine AVCA All-District award winners, and eleven All-Big Ten honorees during his tenure at UW. Cook accepted an assistant coaching position at Nebraska following the 1998 season, with the understanding he would succeed the retiring Terry Pettit in 2000. Cook departed Wisconsin as the school's all-time wins leader, with a record of 161–73 across seven seasons.

=== Nebraska ===
Cook succeeded Terry Pettit as the head coach at Nebraska in 2000; NU went 34–0 and won its second national championship in Cook's first season. Over the following twenty-four years he guided the Cornhuskers to national titles in 2006, 2015, 2017, with seven other national semifinal appearances. Nebraska reached the NCAA tournament in each season of Cook's tenure, without exiting the national top twenty-five. Cook was named AVCA Division I National Coach of the Year in 2000, 2005, and 2023 and won seven conference coach of the year awards at NU across the Big 12 and Big Ten. He was awarded the USA Volleyball All-Time Great Coach Award in 2008 and was inducted into the AVCA Hall of Fame in 2017.

Cook coached three AVCA National Players of the Year – Greichaly Cepero in 2000, Christina Houghtelling in 2005, and Sarah Pavan in 2006. In 2023, Cook was instrumental in the planning and coordination of Volleyball Day in Nebraska at Memorial Stadium, a record-setting outdoor event with a recorded attendance of 92,003.

Cook retired in January 2025 and assisted in the selection of Dani Busboom Kelly, a Nebraska native and former player and assistant under Cook, as his successor.

== Personal life ==
Cook is the great-grandson of Hazel Goes Cook, an early settler of Chula Vista, California. He and his wife Wendy, a former two-time All-America setter at San Diego State, are the parents of daughter Lauren and son Taylor. They own a horse named Bud. Lauren was the starting setter for UCLA during her freshman season in 2009, and garnered National Freshman of the Year honors before transferring to Nebraska and finishing her college career there.

== Head coaching record ==
=== College ===
Record table
Season	Team	Overall	Conference	Standing	Postseason
Wisconsin Badgers (Big Ten Conference) (1992–1998)
1992	Wisconsin	14–17	9–11	7th	
1993	Wisconsin	19–13	11–9	5th	NCAA Division I second round
1994	Wisconsin	21–12	11–9	5th	NCAA Division I first round
1995	Wisconsin	22–15	9–11	7th	
1996	Wisconsin	25–8	13–7	5th	NCAA Division I Regional Semifinal
1997	Wisconsin	30–3	19–1	T–1st	NCAA Division I Regional Final
1998	Wisconsin	30–5	17–3	2nd	NCAA Division I Regional Final
Wisconsin:		161–73 (.688)	89–51 (.636)		
Nebraska Cornhuskers (Big 12 Conference) (2000–2010)
2000	Nebraska	34–0	20–0	1st	NCAA Division I Champion
2001	Nebraska	31–2	20–0	1st	NCAA Division I Semifinal
2002	Nebraska	31–2	20–0	1st	NCAA Division I Regional Final
2003	Nebraska	28–5	17–3	2nd	NCAA Division I Regional Semifinal
2004	Nebraska	30–2	20–0	1st	NCAA Division I Regional Final
2005	Nebraska	33–2	19–1	1st	NCAA Division I Runner-up
2006	Nebraska	33–1	19–1	1st	NCAA Division I Champion
2007	Nebraska	30–2	19–1	T–1st	NCAA Division I Regional Final
2008	Nebraska	31–3	18–2	T–1st	NCAA Division I Semifinal
2009	Nebraska	26–7	16–4	3rd	NCAA Division I Regional Final
2010	Nebraska	29–3	19–1	1st	NCAA Division I Regional Semifinal
Nebraska Cornhuskers (Big Ten Conference) (2011–2024)
2011	Nebraska	25–5	17–3	1st	NCAA Division I second round
2012	Nebraska	26–7	15–5	T–2nd	NCAA Division I Regional Final
2013	Nebraska	26–7	16–4	2nd	NCAA Division I Regional Final
2014	Nebraska	23–10	14–6	4th	NCAA Division I Regional Final
2015	Nebraska	32–4	17–3	2nd	NCAA Division I Champion
2016	Nebraska	31–3	18–2	1st	NCAA Division I Semifinal
2017	Nebraska	32–4	19–1	T–1st	NCAA Division I Champion
2018	Nebraska	29–7	15–5	T–3rd	NCAA Division I Runner-up
2019	Nebraska	28–5	17–3	T–2nd	NCAA Division I Regional Final
2020	Nebraska	16–3	14–2	3rd	NCAA Division I Regional Final
2021	Nebraska	26–8	15–4	2nd	NCAA Division I Runner-up
2022	Nebraska	26–6	16–4	2nd	NCAA Division I Regional Semifinal
2023	Nebraska	33–2	19–1	1st	NCAA Division I Runner-up
2024	Nebraska	33–3	19–1	T–1st	NCAA Division I Semifinal
Nebraska:		722–103 (.875)	438–57 (.885)		
Total:		883–176 (.834)			
National champion Postseason invitational champion Conference regular season champion Conference regular season and conference tournament champion Division regular season champion Division regular season and conference tournament champion Conference tournament champion

== Awards and honors ==
=== Single-season awards ===
- AVCA Division I Central Region Coach of the Year: 1997, 2000, 2005, 2008, 2016, 2023
- AVCA National Coach of the Year: 2000, 2005, 2023
- Big Ten Coach of the Year: 1997 (co), 2016, 2017, 2023
- Big 12 Coach of the Year: 2001, 2005, 2008, 2010
- Volleyball Magazine Coach of the Year: 2008

=== Career awards ===
- USA Volleyball All-Time Great Coach (2008)
- AVCA Hall of Fame (2017)

=== Career achievements ===
- 4 national championships
- 8 national finals
- 12 national semifinals
- 14 conference championships
- 23 top-ten finishes
- 66 All-Americans coached
