= Terry Pettit =

American volleyball coach

Biographical details
- Born: 1946 (age 79–80)
- Education: Manchester University

Coaching career (HC unless noted)
- 1977–1999: Nebraska

Head coaching record
- Overall: 694–148–12 (.820)

Accomplishments and honors

Championships
- 1 National (1995); 18 Big Eight (1977–92, 1994, 1995); 3 Big 12 (1996, 1998, 1999)

Awards
- 2x National Coach of the Year; 9x Conference Coach of the Year; 6x Regional Coach of the Year; University of Nebraska Hall of Fame (2020)

Terry Pettit is an American retired volleyball coach. He was the head women's volleyball coach at Nebraska from 1977 to 1999, where he led the Cornhuskers to the school's first NCAA national championship in 1995 by defeating Texas in the final. He led the team to 21 Big Eight and Big 12 conference championships in his 23 seasons as head coach and established Nebraska as one of the most decorated programs in the sport of volleyball.

== Early life ==
Terry Pettit is a published poet who earned an MFA in creative writing from the University of Arkansas, after earning a B.S. in English from Manchester University in Indiana. He attended graduate school in theology and worked as a reporter for the Church of the Brethren before teaching English and coaching volleyball and tennis at Louisburg College, in Louisburg, North Carolina.

== At Nebraska ==
Terry Pettit was Nebraska's second head coach, and from 1977 to 1999 he built the Cornhuskers into a national power. He led the program to its first national championship (1995), two national runner-up finishes (1986, 1989), and three other national semifinal appearances (1990, 1996, 1998). Pettit earned 19 consecutive NCAA Tournament appearances from 1982 through 1999, and won the Big 8/Big 12 every year except 1993, and 1997, guiding the Huskers to a 694–148 record in his 23 years. He was named the Big 8/Big 12 Coach of the Year in 1985 – 1987, 1989, 1990, 1994 – 1996, and 1998, and the AVCA National Coach of the Year in 1986 and 1994. Pettit was the recipient of the USA Volleyball All-Time Great Coach Award in 2004. Under his tutelage, Karen Dahlgren was named National Player of the Year in 1986 and Allison Weston was named National Player of the Year in 1995. Nebraska led the nation in both All-American and Academic All-American selections during his tenure.

== Legacy ==
To this day, Nebraska has sold out over 300 consecutive games between the Nebraska Coliseum and Bob Devaney Sports Center, and participated in the nine highest-attended volleyball games in NCAA history. At the top of this list is Nebraska's victory over the University of Nebraska at Omaha on August 30, 2023 when 92,003 fans watched the Cornhuskers defeat the Omaha Mavericks 3–0 for the World Record for a women’s sporting event at Memorial Stadium in Lincoln, Nebraska.

In December 2008 Pettit authored "Talent and the Secret Life of Teams," a collection of essays, columns, and creative writing on leadership and team-building based on his career as a coach and director of leadership academies at Creighton University, the University of Denver, and Colorado State University. In December 2013 Pettit authored a second book, "A Fresh Season – Insights Into Coaching, Leadership and Volleyball."

On September 6, 2013, Nebraska played their inaugural match in the newly renovated Bob Devaney Sports Center which became their new home after playing its first 37 seasons in the historic Nebraska Coliseum from 1975 to 2012. To mark the occasion of the team's move to the newly renovated facility, Terry Pettit was honored with a court-naming ceremony during the match against Villanova University. Terry Pettit Court is etched along the sideline on the southwest side of the court.

In 2020, Pettit was inducted into Nebraska's athletic hall of fame.

== Head coaching record ==
National champion	Conference champion	Conference and tournament champion

Season	Team	Overall	Conference	Standing	NCAA tournament	Final rank
Nebraska Cornhuskers (Big Eight Conference) (1977–1995)
1977	Nebraska	42–12–7		1st	Regional semifinalist	
1978	Nebraska	35–25–2		1st	Regional champion	
1979	Nebraska	41–8–3		1st	Regional runner-up	
1980	Nebraska	35–15		1st	Regional runner-up	
1981	Nebraska	29–10		1st		
1982	Nebraska	27–6		1st	Regional semifinalist	15
1983	Nebraska	29–4	10–0	1st	First round	16
1984	Nebraska	29–4	10–0	1st	Regional runner-up	7
1985	Nebraska	28–3	10–0	1st	Regional runner-up	6
1986	Nebraska	29–6	10–0	1st	National runner-up	6
1987	Nebraska	30–5	10–0	1st	Regional runner-up	10
1988	Nebraska	28–5	11–1	1st	Regional semifinalist	5
1989	Nebraska	29–4	12–0	1st	National runner-up	5
1990	Nebraska	32–3	12–0	1st	National semifinalist	2
1991	Nebraska	27–5	12–0	1st	Regional runner-up	7
1992	Nebraska	22–6	12–0	1st	Regional semifinalist	7
1993	Nebraska	25–6	10–2	2nd	Second round	8
1994	Nebraska	31–1	12–0	1st	Regional runner-up	1
1995	Nebraska	32–1	12–0	1st	NCAA champion	1
Nebraska Cornhuskers (Big 12 Conference) (1996–1999)
1996	Nebraska	30–4	19–1	1st	National semifinalist	3
1997	Nebraska	27–7	16–4	2nd	Regional runner-up	8
1998	Nebraska	32–2	19–1	1st	National semifinalist	3
1999	Nebraska	27–6	17–3	1st	Regional semifinalist	11
Nebraska:		694–148–12	214–12			

The Big 12 does not play conference tournaments.
