= Nebraska Cornhuskers women's volleyball =

University of Nebraska–Lincoln volleyball team

- Founded: 1975; 51 years ago
- University: University of Nebraska–Lincoln
- Athletic director: Troy Dannen
- Head coach: Dani Busboom Kelly (2nd season)
- Conference: Big Ten
- Location: Lincoln, Nebraska
- Home arena: Bob Devaney Sports Center (capacity: 10,000+)
- Nickname: Cornhuskers
- Colors: Scarlet and cream

AIAW/NCAA tournament champion
- 1995, 2000, 2006, 2015, 2017

AIAW/NCAA tournament runner-up
- 1986, 1989, 2005, 2018, 2021, 2023

AIAW/NCAA tournament semifinal
- 1986, 1989, 1990, 1995, 1996, 1998, 2000, 2001, 2005, 2006, 2008, 2015, 2016, 2017, 2018, 2021, 2023, 2024

AIAW/NCAA tournament appearance
- 1975, 1976, 1977, 1978, 1979, 1980, 1982, 1983, 1984, 1985, 1986, 1987, 1988, 1989, 1990, 1991, 1992, 1993, 1994, 1995, 1996, 1997, 1998, 1999, 2000, 2001, 2002, 2003, 2004, 2005, 2006, 2007, 2008, 2009, 2010, 2011, 2012, 2013, 2014, 2015, 2016, 2017, 2018, 2019, 2020, 2021, 2022, 2023, 2024, 2025

Conference tournament champion
- Big 8: 1976, 1977, 1978, 1979, 1980, 1981, 1982, 1983, 1984, 1985, 1986, 1988, 1989, 1990, 1991, 1994, 1995; Big 12: No conference tournaments held; Big Ten: Inaugural conference tournament in 2026

Conference regular season champion
- Big 8: 1976, 1977, 1978, 1979, 1980, 1981, 1982, 1983, 1984, 1985, 1986, 1987, 1988, 1989, 1990, 1991, 1992, 1994, 1995; Big 12: 1996, 1998, 1999, 2000, 2001, 2002, 2004, 2005, 2006, 2007, 2008, 2010; Big Ten: 2011, 2016, 2017, 2023, 2024, 2025, 2026

The Nebraska Cornhuskers women's volleyball team competes as part of NCAA Division I, representing the University of Nebraska–Lincoln in the Big Ten Conference. Nebraska played nearly four decades at the NU Coliseum until they moved to the larger Bob Devaney Sports Center in 2012. The program has been led by Dani Busboom Kelly since she succeeded longtime head coach John Cook in 2025.

The program became an official varsity sport in 1975 and has become one of the most decorated in women's volleyball – Nebraska has won more games, spent more weeks ranked number one, and produced more AVCA All-Americans than any other program. Head coach Terry Pettit, hired in 1977, turned the Cornhuskers into a national power at a time when the sport was traditionally dominated by West Coast schools. He produced NU's first national championship in 1995 before handing the program over to assistant John Cook five years later. Cook led the NCAA's second-ever undefeated season in his debut as head coach and soon established himself as one of the best coaches in the sport's history, winning four national championships and producing some of volleyball's biggest stars, including Sarah Pavan, Jordan Larson, and Lexi Rodriguez. Cook retired in 2025, assisting in the selection of Dani Busboom Kelly as his successor.

Nebraska regularly leads the NCAA in attendance and has competed in several of the highest-attended and most-watched volleyball games ever played. The university hosted Volleyball Day in Nebraska in 2023, which was attended by 92,003 people and set a Memorial Stadium attendance record.

== History ==
=== Early years (1967–1976) ===
Nebraska's volleyball history began in 1967 as an "extramural" sport operating as part of the school's physical education department. The team was generally coached by graduate students seeking a teaching credit, and had no dedicated uniforms or practice time. Nebraska entered its first tournament in 1971, traveling to Kansas and winning three games against schools with established varsity programs.

Pat Sullivan was named head coach in 1974, two years after the passing of Title IX, to lead the program's first season of varsity competition. Though the school offered its first scholarships for female student-athletes to members of this team, which went 25–10–1 and placed sixth in the AIAW's Region VI tournament, the university recognizes 1975 as its inaugural season due to "a lack of records [from 1974] and tradition." Sullivan later helped assemble a complete list of records from this season, and insisted players from her 1974 team be included when the university celebrated the fiftieth anniversary of its "inaugural" 1975 team in 2024.

Sullivan compiled an 83–21 record over two official seasons, including an AIAW regional final appearance in 1975 and NU's first Big Eight championship in 1976. These early teams were not well-funded – they relied on secondhand equipment from various men's sports and organized fundraisers to fly themselves to national tournaments. Sullivan resigned in 1977 to serve as an associate athletic director under Bob Devaney, later resuming her coaching career at George Washington.

=== Terry Pettit (1977–1999) ===
Building a powerhouse

Terry Pettit was hired as Nebraska's second head coach in 1977 at an annual salary of $12,000 ($63,756 in 2025). The Indiana native was a poetry teacher and volleyball coach at Louisburg College in North Carolina when women's basketball coach Paul Sanderford directed him to apply for Nebraska's open job (twenty years later, Sanderford followed Pettit to NU). Pettit began hosting clinics at high schools across Nebraska, including many small schools where women's volleyball had been entrenched as a spectator sport for decades. His dedication to local development is often cited as a contributing factor to the modern popularity of collegiate volleyball in the state. Early in Pettit's tenure, he scheduled home volleyball matches on the same day as football games, hoping to attract fans to the NU Coliseum as they left nearby Memorial Stadium.

In 1978, Terri Kanouse and Shandi Pettine became the first volleyball student-athletes at Nebraska (and among the first at any school) to receive full scholarships. The pair were the first All-America selections in school history and led the Cornhuskers to four consecutive AIAW tournament appearances, helping to establish Nebraska as one of few prominent volleyball programs outside of the West Coast. The NCAA Division I tournament was created in 1981 (the AIAW tournament coexisted with the NCAA tournament for a single season before being discontinued) – Nebraska was not invited to the twenty-team field despite completing a fourth consecutive unbeaten Big Eight season, the only time NU has missed the NCAA Division I tournament. Nebraska debuted at No. 20 when the American Volleyball Coaches Association began weekly polling of collegiate coaches in 1982 and is the only program to never drop out of the AVCA rankings. After NU defeated future rival Penn State in its NCAA tournament debut in 1982, assistant Russ Rose departed Lincoln for State College and served as PSU's head coach for the next forty-three years.

Pettit flew to Oregon to interview with the Ducks in 1985 but declined an offer to become their head coach, and soon his Nebraska program took the final step toward becoming a national power. NU reached the national championship game for the first time in 1986, led by middle blocker Karen Dahlgren and her revolutionary "slide attack" (rarely seen in college at the time). NU returned to the title game in Hawaii in 1989 as a fan favorite among locals, but was swept by Long Beach State. Pettit's 1989 team included Janet Kruse, Virginia Stahr, and Stephanie Thater, who became NU's first players to twice be named a first-team All-American.

With Kruse and Stahr graduated, Nebraska lost control of the Big Eight in 1993 after seventeen consecutive regular-season championships, twice losing to Colorado and exiting the NCAA tournament before the regional semifinal for the first time since 1983. Papillion native Allison Weston was a sophomore on this team, receiving the first of three first-team All-America selections. Weston led a resurgent Nebraska to a 29–0 regular season with just five set losses in 1994, the best start in school history, but Nebraska was upset at home by Penn State in the regional final. NU frequently hosted early-round NCAA Division I tournament games due largely to the persistence of associate athletic director Barbara Hibner, who convinced Devaney and his successor Bill Byrne to bid aggressively for national events.

National breakthrough

After an early loss to Stanford in 1995, Nebraska won twenty-six consecutive games to finish the regular season 27–1 and enter the postseason as the country's top-ranked team for a second straight year. NU avenged its 1994 tournament loss to Penn State in Lincoln and rallied from first-set losses to Michigan State and Texas to claim the program's first national championship. Nebraska was just the third school from outside California or Hawaii to win a men's or women's volleyball national title, and Weston became NU's first athlete to be named AVCA Player of the Year. Months after the title game, the Cornhuskers and Longhorns became conference foes when the Big Eight merged with the Southwest to form the Big 12 Conference. Nebraska left the Big Eight with a conference record of 192–5–1, winning nineteen regular season and seventeen tournament titles in twenty seasons.

After Nebraska's win over Wisconsin in the 1998 NCAA Division I tournament, Pettit dined with former assistant and Badgers head coach John Cook. Months later, Pettit re-hired Cook – his abrupt departure from UW, where he had just led the three most successful seasons in school history, meant few were surprised when Pettit retired following the season and named Cook his successor. Pettit left as the fifth-winningest coach in collegiate volleyball history; he was inducted into the AVCA Hall of Fame in 2009 and the Nebraska Athletic Hall of Fame in 2020. He won 694 games and thirty-seven combined conference championships (regular season and tournament) across twenty-three-years, producing more All-Americans than any other program during his tenure. When Nebraska moved its volleyball program to the Bob Devaney Sports Center in 2013, the playing surface was dedicated in Pettit's honor. After retiring at just fifty-four years old, he became a motivational speaker, author, and podcaster and regularly offers opinions on Nebraska athletics.

=== John Cook (2000–2024) ===
Early success under Cook

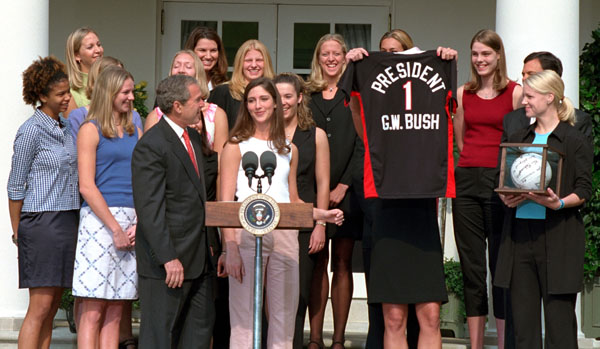
Nebraska's 2000 NCAA Division I championship team was honored by President George W. Bush at the White House on May 31, 2001

Despite the absence of two-time All-American Nancy Metcalf, who redshirted after missing spring practice to compete for a spot on the United States national team, Cook inherited a strong roster and Pettit later confessed he considered delaying his retirement after a disappointing postseason in 1999. Nebraska started outside the national top ten but coasted to a 28–0 regular season and survived a five-set scare against South Carolina in the second round of the NCAA tournament, a game in which converted pin hitter Laura Pilakowski had fifteen kills despite undergoing an appendectomy ten days earlier. Cook met his former team in the national championship match, recovering from a 2–1 deficit to complete the second undefeated season in NCAA Division I women's volleyball history.

Led by setter Greichaly Cepero, the 2000 AVCA national player of the year as a sophomore, and a returning Metcalf, Nebraska finished 20–0 in conference play in each of the 2001 and 2002 seasons, extending a Big 12 win streak that would eventually reach seventy-seven. Postseason losses ended both seasons at 31–2.

Nebraska earned the NCAA Division I tournament's top overall seed in 2004 despite a stunning loss to Florida A&M at the Coliseum, its first home loss to an unranked opponent since 1986. It was NU's only loss of the regular season, after which Sarah Pavan was named AVCA Freshman of the Year – she would later become the fourth Division I player to earn four first-team All-America honors and won the 2006–07 Broderick Cup as the best female athlete in the country. Nebraska was upset by USC before reaching the national semifinal, the fourth of five consecutive seasons NU was eliminated from NCAA tournament by a West Coast opponent.

Mid-2000s dominance

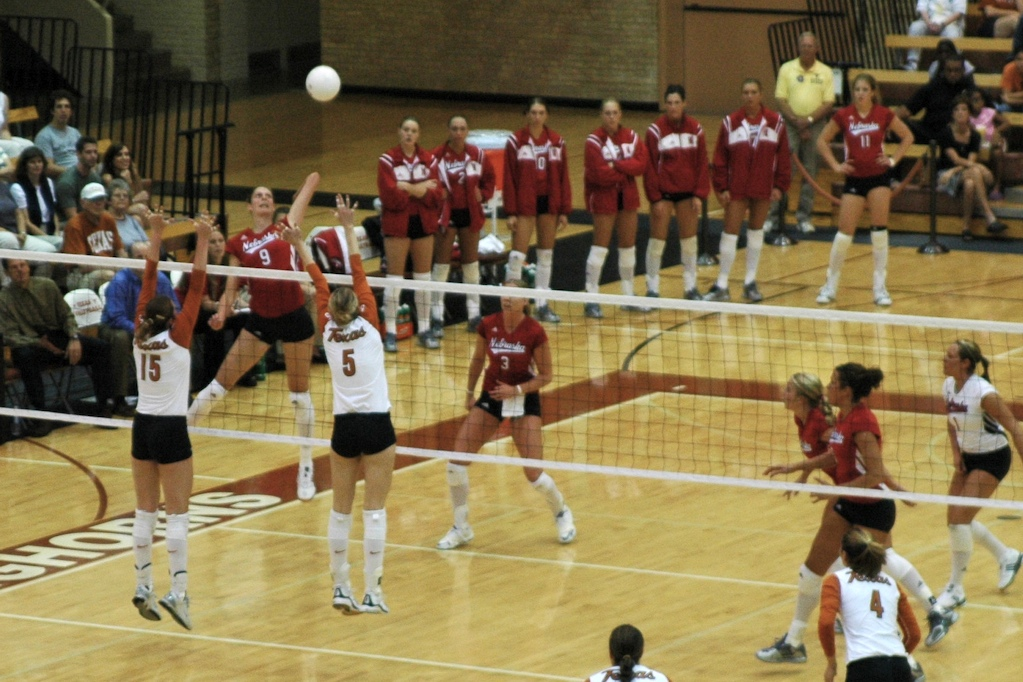
Sarah Pavan takes a swing against Texas at Gregory Gymnasium on Oct. 20, 2004

Pavan led a blistering start to 2005 that saw Nebraska defeat four top-five opponents within the season's first two weeks. Middle blocker Melissa Elmer set several NCAA blocking records, ending with 250 blocks despite twenty-seven of NU's matches lasting three sets. Four of NU's five primary front-row attackers – Pavan, Elmer, outside hitter Christina Houghtelling, and middle blocker Jennifer Saleaumua – were named to All-America teams, while the fifth was freshman standout Jordan Larson. Nebraska was again the top seed in the NCAA tournament and swept through the first five rounds, but was upset by Washington in the national title match.

Nebraska lost only once in 2006, becoming the top seed in the NCAA Division I tournament for a third consecutive year. A five-set win over Minnesota sent Cook's team to the national semifinal, hosted in Omaha for the first time ever. As expected, the events in Omaha shattered volleyball attendance records, culminating in a four-set Nebraska victory over Stanford to claim its third national title. Pavan and Larson combined for forty-one kills as NU became the first host team to win the championship since 1991.

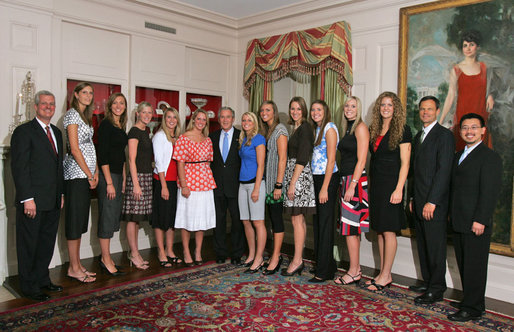
Nebraska's 2006 NCAA Division I championship team was honored by President George W. Bush at the White House on June 19, 2007

Hoping to capitalize on momentum after winning a title in its home state, Cook took his team to North Platte to play a spring exhibition in April 2007, the start of an annual tradition that has seen the Cornhuskers travel to small towns across Nebraska. NU began the season three months later the favorite to repeat as champion and started 19–0 before an October loss at Texas ended NU's record streak as the number-one team in the weekly AVCA poll. At the time, Nebraska had played 103 consecutive matches and nearly three full seasons as the country's top-ranked team. Pavan's storied career came to a close in a regional final loss to California; months later, she joined softball pitcher Cat Osterman as the only repeat Big 12 Female Athlete of the Year.

Led by a senior Larson and several other state natives, Nebraska won its fifth consecutive Big 12 title in 2008 and advanced through the first three rounds of the NCAA tournament. Trailing Washington 9–3 in the fifth set, libero Kayla Banwarth led a nine-point service run to complete a comeback victory and advance to the national semifinal in Omaha, where Nebraska fell behind 2–0 against undefeated Penn State before dominating the third set to snap PSU's streak of 111 consecutive set wins. NU led 10–8 in the decisive fifth set before a six-point Nittany Lions run won the match. The 2008 tournament marked the second time in three years NCAA events in Omaha shattered Division I attendance records, forcing AVCA executive director Kathy DeBoer to rebuff calls to make Omaha the permanent site of the national semifinal and championship rounds, though she praised Nebraska fans and described the state as "the epicenter of volleyball fandom."

UCLA ended Nebraska's record ninety-match home win streak early in 2009, and Texas ended NU's five-year run atop the Big 12, becoming the first team to beat the Cornhuskers three times in one season. The following offseason, the University of Nebraska–Lincoln announced it was ending its fifteen-year relationship with the Big 12 to join the Big Ten the following summer. NU went 19–1 to win the Big 12 in its final season, departing with an all-time conference record of 278–22 and twelve championships. Nebraska was upset by Washington in a controversial regional final, after which Cook and Huskies head coach Jim McLaughlin engaged in a shouting match and were restrained by NCAA personnel. Cook had been vocal about NU, the No. 2 national seed, being sent to play in Seattle, and he was later influential in the reformatting of the NCAA Division I tournament to allow higher seeds to host regional rounds.

Move to the Big Ten

Nebraska's 2011 move to the Big Ten Conference meant that for the first time NU would regularly face longtime rival and four-time defending national champion Penn State, as well as Cook's former employer Wisconsin, which was about to become a national power under Kelly Sheffield. NU won the Big Ten in its first year but was upset by Kansas State at the Coliseum in the second round of the NCAA tournament, Nebraska's earliest exit since 1993. During the season, starting setter Lauren Cook was arrested for fleeing a hit-and-run accident and charged with a felony – Cook received minimal criminal punishment and missed only two games, prompting accusations of preferential treatment given her status.

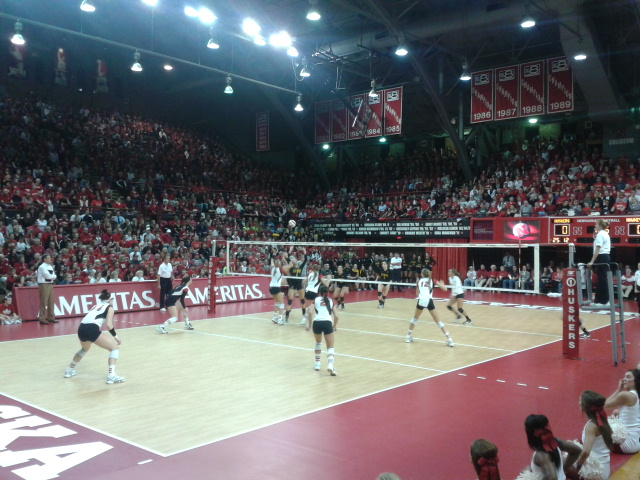
Nebraska vs. Iowa at the NU Coliseum on Nov. 21, 2012, one of the last volleyball games at the venue

Tennessee transfer Kelsey Robinson was named Big Ten Player of the Year in 2013, the program's first season at a renovated Bob Devaney Sports Center after thirty-eight years at the NU Coliseum. With Robinson graduated after a single season, a young Nebraska roster went just 23–10, the program's most losses since 1981 and the sixth consecutive season without a trip to the national semifinal. The drought ended in 2015, when freshman outside hitter Mikaela Foecke and twin sisters Amber and Kadie Rolfzen led a sixteen-game win streak that culminated in a national championship sweep of Texas in Omaha. Foecke had nineteen kills and became the third freshman named the NCAA Division I tournament's most outstanding player.

NU spent much of the following season ranked number one in the country and won the program's first conference title since 2011. Nebraska was the NCAA tournament's top seed for the fifth time under Cook and fought off two match points to defeat upset-minded Penn State, but fell to Texas a week later in the national semifinal.

After consecutive season-opening losses in 2017, Nebraska lost just twice more and shared the Big Ten title with Penn State. NU defeated the top-seeded Nittany Lions in five sets to advance to the national title match, avenging an early-season loss to Florida to win the school's fifth national title in front of a record crowd of 18,516. Foecke became the fourth player to twice be named the NCAA Division I tournament's most outstanding player. Cook created a mild controversy after volunteering his team to visit the White House when the Super Bowl champion Philadelphia Eagles canceled.

Despite the graduation of Foecke and starting setter Kelly Hunter, NU made a program-record fourth straight trip to the national semifinal in 2018, losing to Stanford in a five-set title match.

End of Cook's tenure

The outbreak of COVID-19 shifted the 2020 volleyball season to the spring of 2021, and several of Nebraska's matches were canceled or forfeited due to virus outbreaks throughout the Big Ten. The NCAA Division I tournament was shrunk to forty-eight teams and held entirely at the CHI Health Center Omaha, a setup that was criticized by high-profile coaches, most notably Cook, who volunteered the Devaney Center as a second host venue.

The Cornhuskers returned to the national championship match in 2021; Wisconsin's five-set victory broke attendance and viewership records, becoming NU's fifth consecutive national title appearance to set a sport-wide attendance record. Following the season, freshman Lexi Rodriguez became the second Cornhusker and first libero to be named the AVCA Freshman of the Year.

On August 30, 2023, Nebraska hosted Volleyball Day in Nebraska at Memorial Stadium, a two-match event featuring four schools from the University of Nebraska system. The official attendance for Nebraska's 3–0 victory over Omaha in the second match was 92,003, a Memorial Stadium record and one of the highest ever for a women's sporting event. It was the fourth of twenty-seven consecutive victories to open the season, including a five-set win over top-ranked Wisconsin that ended a ten-match losing streak to the Badgers. NU spent the rest of the season ranked No. 1 but was swept by Texas in the national title match, its third national runner-up finish in six years.

Cook announced his retirement in January 2025 after 722 victories, fourteen conference championships, and four national titles in twenty-five years as head coach. He was inducted into the AVCA Hall of Fame in 2017 and is considered one of the best coaches in collegiate volleyball history. His twenty-five-year tenure at Nebraska matched football legend Tom Osborne, a longtime mentor of Cook's.

=== Dani Busboom Kelly (2025–present) ===
Nebraska named Louisville head coach Dani Busboom Kelly, a former NU player and assistant under Cook, as his successor.

== Conference affiliations ==
- Independent (1975)
- Big Eight Conference (1976–1995)
- Big 12 Conference (1996–2010)
- Big Ten Conference (2011–present)

== Coaches ==
=== Coaching history ===
No.	Coach	Tenure	Overall	Conference
1	Pat Sullivan	1975–1976	83–21 (.798)	5–0 (1.000)
2	Terry Pettit	1977–1999	694–148–12 (.820)	255–15–1 (.943)
3	John Cook	2000–2024	722–103 (.875)	438–57 (.885)
4	Dani Busboom Kelly	2025–present	61–1 (.984)	37-0(1.000)

Assistant coaching history

- Russ Rose (1978–1979)
- Linda Luedtke (1980)
- John Corbelli (1981)
- Barry Janzen (1982–1983)
- Jay Potter (1984–1987)
- Jeff Nelson (1986)
- Terri Killion (1988–1989)
- John Cook (1988–1990, 1999)
- Cathy Noth (1988–1998)
- Brian Begor (1991–1992)
- Val Novak (1993–1994)
- Todd Raasch (1995)
- Nikki Best (1996–1999)
- Craig Skinner (2000–2004)
- Staci Wolfe (2000–2002)
- Charlene Johnson-Tagaloa (2003–2006)
- Lee Maes (2005–2007)
- Lizzy Stemke (2007–2010)
- Erik Sullivan (2008–2010)
- Dan Conners (2010–2011)
- Dan Meske (2010–2014)
- Dani Busboom Kelly (2012–2016)
- Chris Tamas (2015–2016)
- Kayla Banwarth (2017–2019)
- Tyler Hildebrand (2017, 2020–2021)
- Jaylen Reyes (2018–present)
- Kelly Hunter (2020–present)
- Jordan Larson (2023–2024)
- Brennan Hagar (2025–present)

=== Coaching staff ===
Coach	Position	First year	Alma mater
Dani Busboom Kelly	Head coach	2025	Nebraska
Kelly Hunter	Assistant coach	2020	Nebraska
Jaylen Reyes	Assistant coach / recruiting coordinator	2018	BYU
Brennan Hagar	Assistant coach	2025	Ottawa (KS)

== Venues ==
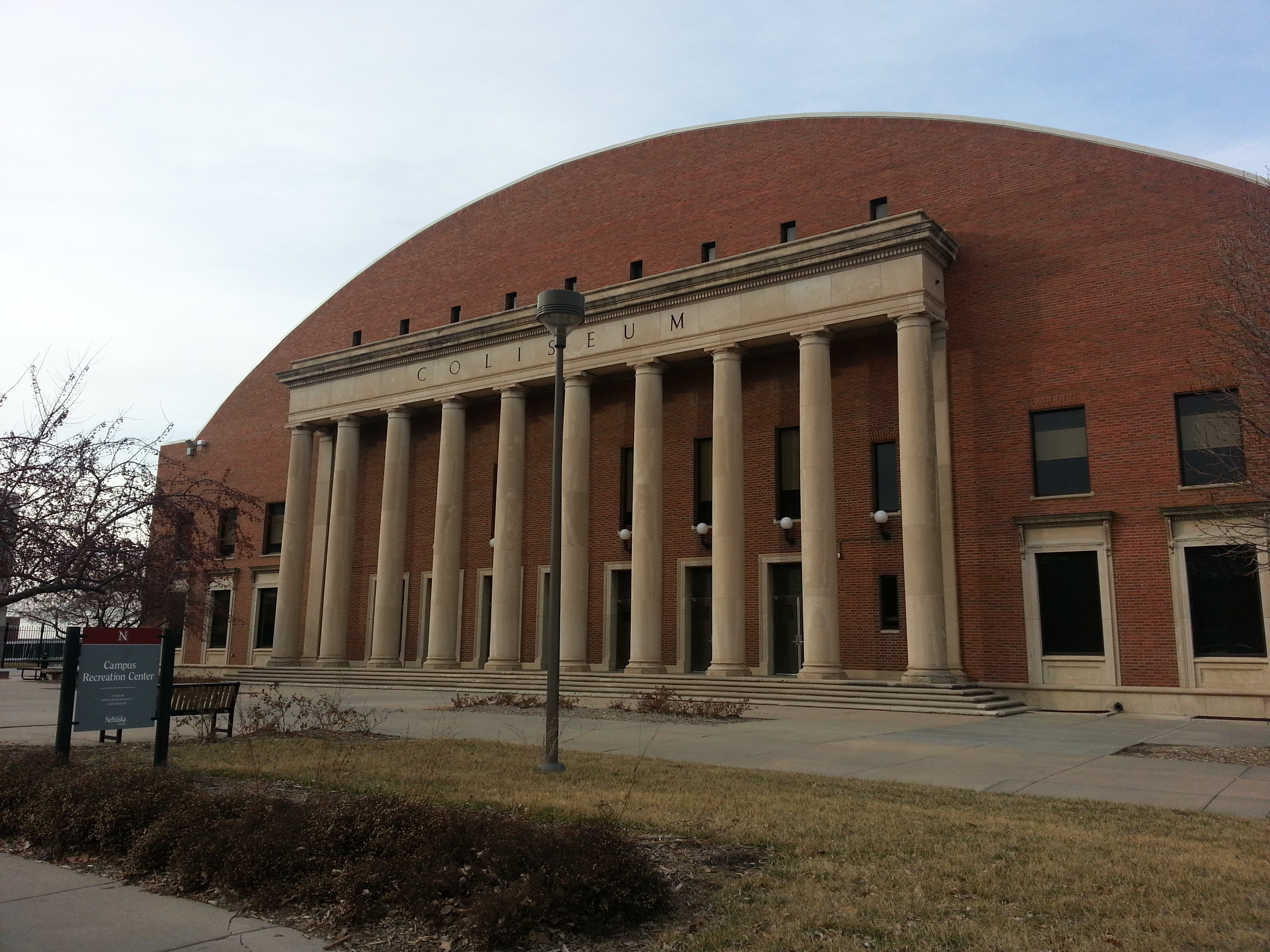
Nebraska played at the NU Coliseum from 1975 until 2012

=== NU Coliseum ===
Nebraska played its first varsity volleyball season at Mabel Lee Hall before moving to the NU Coliseum in 1975. The Coliseum was constructed in 1926 adjacent to the recently completed Memorial Stadium – initially intended to be part of the stadium complex, the Coliseum was funded as a standalone project using gate receipts from 1923 football games. It was designed by architects Ellery L. Davis and Walter Wilson, both university alumni who had worked on several buildings on campus, and later hosted Nebraska's volleyball program for thirty-eight seasons.

The Coliseum originally housed all of the university's indoor sports, but many of these moved to the NU Sports Complex (later the Bob Devaney Sports Center) in 1976, and the Coliseum underwent an extensive renovation in 1991 to better suit the needs of the volleyball program. The venue, one of few designed specifically for volleyball, became known for its Roman-style architecture and intimate atmosphere which generated deafening acoustics. For decades the Coliseum provided a significant home-court advantage – Nebraska compiled an all-time record of 511–36 at the venue, including a 52–4 mark in the NCAA Division I tournament.

Nebraska set an NCAA Division I record with ninety consecutive home victories from 2004 to 2009. The streak ended against UCLA on September 14, 2009 in front of an NCAA regular-season-record crowd at the Devaney Center; NU's win streak at the Coliseum ended two weeks later.

=== Bob Devaney Sports Center ===
By the late 2000s, demand for tickets at the Coliseum vastly exceeded the venue's approximately 4,000-seat capacity. When construction began on West Haymarket Arena to host Nebraska's basketball programs, athletic director Tom Osborne led an effort to move volleyball to the vacated Devaney Center, which had previously hosted select games. Head coach John Cook viewed Osborne as a mentor throughout his career but resisted the relocation proposal, relenting when the university committed to a $27-million redevelopment of the facility. Thousands of seats were removed from the main arena, lowering capacity to around 8,000 with luxury suites for boosters and courtside seating for students, and the outdated venue received extensive modernization. The playing surface was dedicated in honor of Terry Pettit.

Nebraska and Hawaii were the only programs to average more than 4,000 fans per home game in 2012, the year prior to NU's move to the Devaney Center, but Cook believed his program could consistently fill an arena twice the size of the Coliseum. He was proven correct in the ensuing years – Nebraska has sold out every home game and led the country in attendance by a wide margin each year at the Devaney Center. (Note: Sellout streaks and home attendance figures do not include the 2021 spring season in which many schools, including Nebraska, did not host fans due to the COVID-19 pandemic.) The arena was renamed in honor of Cook after his retirement in 2025, with a statue to be constructed on the north side of the complex.

The arena's listed capacity is 8,309, including standing-room-only areas, though proposed future expansions will raise capacity to nearly 10,000 by 2026. The push to expand the arena despite already regularly leading the country in attendance came as the school sought to entrench the program as a financial asset. Nebraska has consistently turned a profit since moving to the Devaney Center, a rarity in women's sports, peaking at a record $1.3 million in 2023.

=== Attendance ===
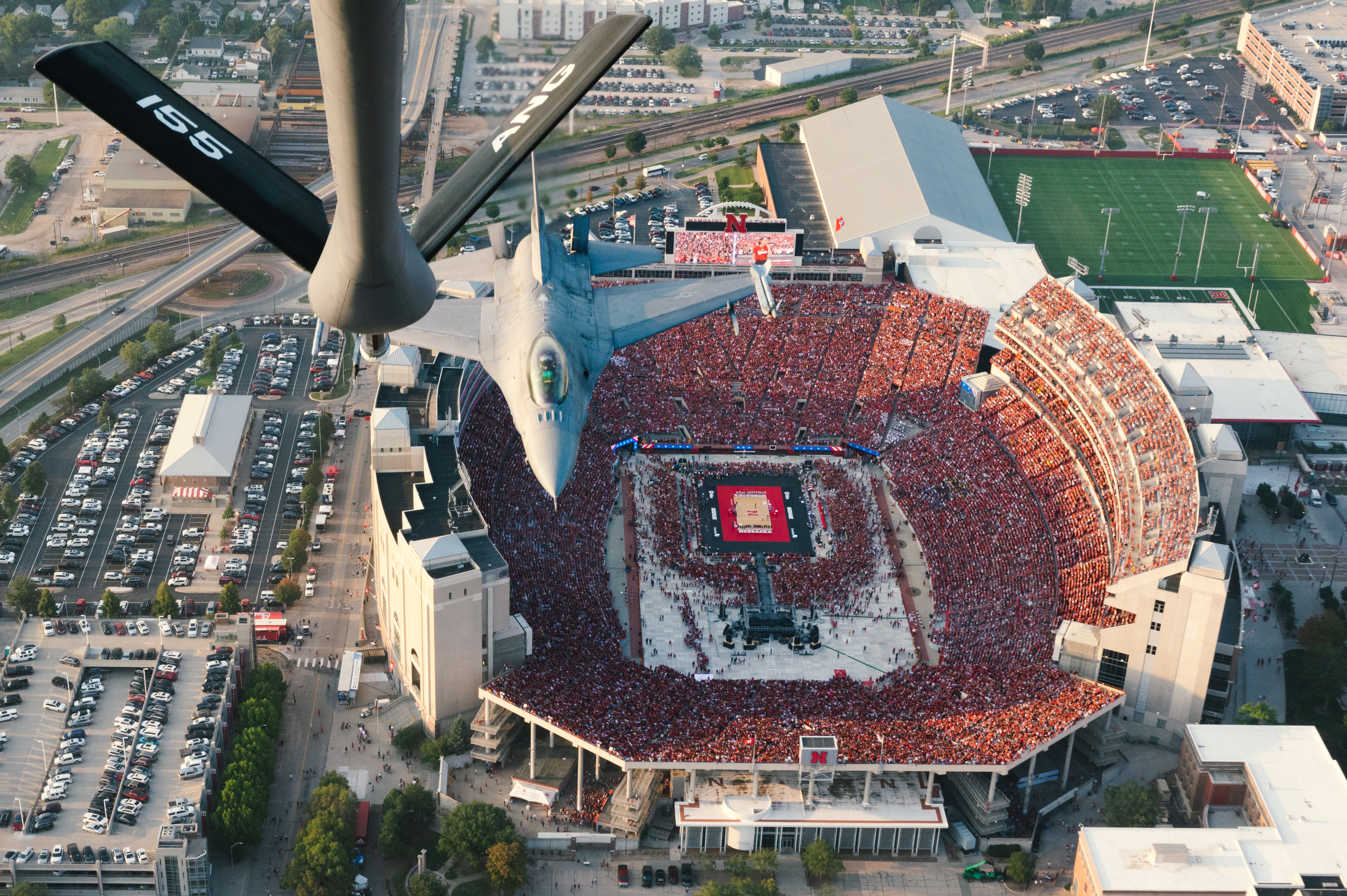
A KC-135 Stratotanker of the Nebraska Air National Guard and a F-16 Fighting Falcon of the South Dakota Air National Guard conduct a pregame flyover of Memorial Stadium during Volleyball Day in Nebraska on August 30, 2023.

Nebraska has sold out 337 consecutive home matches, a streak that began in 2001 and continued from the NU Coliseum to the Devaney Center. It is the longest streak in any collegiate women's sport and second only to NU's football sellout streak across all sports.

The program has participated in eleven of the twelve highest-attended collegiate volleyball games ever played. (Note: The NCAA lists identical attendance for both matches of national semifinals and counts these as a single event.) Nebraska's status within college volleyball – in terms of attendance, television ratings, and resources dedicated to the program – was a driving factor toward the considerable growth of the sport in the early 2020s.

Volleyball Day in Nebraska

On August 30, 2023, the university hosted Volleyball Day in Nebraska at Memorial Stadium, a two-game event which featured three schools from the University of Nebraska system and one from the Nebraska State College System. Division II Nebraska–Kearney met Wayne State before Nebraska defeated Omaha in front of 92,003 people, a venue record that ranks as one of the highest-attended women's sporting events ever. The court was set up on the north side of the field but tickets were sold throughout the stadium; the addition of field-level tickets allowed the event to set a Memorial Stadium attendance record. General admission tickets were initially priced at $25, but in some cases sold for over $400 on the secondary market. The game was televised nationally on the Big Ten Network, averaging 518,000 viewers to become the second-most-watched regular-season volleyball broadcast ever.

== Championships and awards ==
=== NCAA Division I tournament ===
- National champion: 1995, 2000, 2006, 2015, 2017
- National runner-up: 1986, 1989, 2005, 2018, 2021, 2023
- National semifinalist: 1990, 1996, 1998, 2001, 2008, 2016, 2024

=== Conference championships ===
Regular season

The Cornhuskers have won a total of 38 conference regular season championships in program history.

- Big Eight: 1976, 1977, 1978, 1979, 1980, 1981, 1982, 1983, 1984, 1985, 1986, 1987, 1988, 1989, 1990, 1991, 1992, 1994, 1995
- Big 12: 1996, 1998, 1999, 2000, 2001, 2002, 2004, 2005, 2006, 2007, 2008, 2010
- Big Ten: 2011, 2016, 2017, 2023, 2024, 2025, 2026

The Cornhuskers have won a total of 17 conference tournament championships in program history. All of these conference tournament championships occurred while Nebraska was a member of the Big Eight Conference. The Big 12 Conference did not hold a conference volleyball tournament. The Big Ten Conference will hold its inaugural conference volleyball tournament in 2026.

Tournament (Note: The Big 12 and Big Ten did not play conference tournaments.The Big Ten began a conference tournament in 2026.)

- Big Eight: 1976, 1977, 1978, 1979, 1980, 1981, 1982, 1983, 1984, 1985, 1986, 1988, 1989, 1990, 1991, 1994, 1995

=== National records ===
Team

- Wins: 1,560
- Win percentage in a season: 1.000 (2000, tied with four others)
- Consecutive winning seasons: 51 (1975–2025)
- Weeks ranked No. 1: 135
- AVCA All-America athletes (any team): 56
- AVCA All-America awards (any team): 111
- Assists in a match: 116 (Nov. 5, 1988 vs. Texas)
- Blocks per set in a season: 4.18 (2001)

Individual

- Hitting percentage in a match (min. 10 kills): 1.000 (three players, tied with several others)
- Assists in a match: Lori Endicott, 109 (Nov. 5, 1988 vs. Texas)
- Blocks in a season: Melissa Elmer, 250 (2005)
- Blocks per set in a season: Melissa Elmer, 2.17 (2005)

== Postseason results ==
=== AIAW tournament ===
Nebraska appeared in six AIAW tournaments with a record of 38–15. (Note: The AIAW tournament featured pool play at both the regional and national levels, meaning schools often played far more games than a typical single-elimination tournament.)

=== NCAA Division I tournament ===
Nebraska has appeared in 44 NCAA Division I tournaments with a record of 137–39, including five championships, six runner-ups, and seven other national semifinal appearances.

Year	Seed (Note: The NCAA began seeding teams in 1993. From 1993 until 1999, each region was assigned seeds one through four, with the remaining teams unseeded. From 2000 until 2021, each team has been given a unique one through sixteen seed. Since 2022, each region was assigned seeds one through eight, with the remaining teams unseeded.)	Round	Opponent	Result
1982		First round Regional semifinal	Penn State; No. 9 Purdue	W 3–0; L 3–2
1983		First round	No. 9 Western Michigan	L 3–1
1984		First round Regional semifinal Regional final	Pittsburgh; No. 19 Western Michigan; No. 3 Pacific (CA)	W 3–0; W 3–1; L 3–1
1985		First round Regional semifinal Regional final	No. 20 Penn State; No. 10 Purdue; No. 3 USC	W 3–0; W 3–1; L 3–1
1986		First round Regional semifinal Regional final National semifinal National final	Pittsburgh; No. 14 Penn State; No. 9 Illinois; No. 11 Stanford; No. 2 Pacific (CA)	W 3–1; W 3–2; W 3–0; W 3–1; L 3–0
1987		First round Regional semifinal Regional final	Northern Iowa; Purdue; No. 8 Illinois	W 3–0; W 3–0; L 3–0
1988		First round Regional semifinal	Weber State; No. 13 Oklahoma	W 3–2; L 3–2
1989		First round Regional semifinal Regional final National semifinal National final	Illinois State; Minnesota; No. 7 Illinois; No. 1 UCLA; No. 4 Long Beach State	W 3–0; W 3–1; W 3–0; W 3–0; L 3–0
1990		First round Regional semifinal Regional final National semifinal	Miami (OH); No. 18 Pittsburgh; No. 6 Penn State; No. 5 Pacific (CA)	W 3–0; W 3–0; W 3–1; L 3–1
1991		First round Regional semifinal Regional final	Illinois; Wisconsin; No. 12 Ohio State	W 3–0; W 3–0; L 3–1
1992		First round Regional semifinal	No. 15 Colorado; No. 6 Illinois	W 3–1; L 3–1
1993		First round Regional semifinal	Cornell (4 ME) No. 17 Notre Dame	W 3–0; L 3–0
1994	1 ME	Second round Regional semifinal Regional final	George Washington (4 ME) No. 13 Colorado (2 ME) No. 5 Penn State	W 3–0; W 3–0; L 3–1
1995	1 C	Second round Regional semifinal Regional final National semifinal National final	George Mason (4 C) No. 10 Penn State (2 C) No. 7 UCLA (2 MTN) No. 4 Michigan State (2 E) No. 3 Texas	W 3–0; W 3–1; W 3–0; W 3–2; W 3–1
1996	1 E	Second round Regional semifinal Regional final National semifinal	Arkansas; No. 22 Louisville (2 E) No. 3 Penn State (1 PAC) No. 2 Stanford	W 3–1; W 3–0; W 3–2; L 3–1
1997	2 PAC	Second round Regional semifinal Regional final	Michigan State; No. 7 USC (1 PAC) No. 1 Long Beach State	W 3–0; W 3–2; L 3–0
1998	1 PAC	First round Second round Regional semifinal Regional final National semifinal	Morgan State; Utah; Pepperdine (2 PAC) No. 8 Wisconsin (1 C) No. 2 Penn State	W 3–0; W 3–1; W 3–2; W 3–2; L 3–1
1999	3 PAC	First round Second round Regional semifinal	Davidson; No. 25 San Diego (2 PAC) No. 7 UCSB	W 3–0; W 3–0; L 3–1
2000	1	First round Second round Regional semifinal Regional final National semifinal National final	Princeton; South Carolina (16) No. 15 Ohio State (8) No. 5 Arizona (5) No. 3 Hawaii (7) No. 4 Wisconsin	W 3–0; W 3–2; W 3–0; W 3–0; W 3–1; W 3–2
2001	2	First round Second round Regional semifinal Regional final National semifinal	Oral Roberts; No. 18 Kansas State (15) No. 9 Colorado State (10) No. 7 Florida (3) No. 3 Stanford	W 3–0; W 3–1; W 3–1; W 3–2; L 3–0
2002	3	First round Second round Regional semifinal Regional final	UT Martin; Arizona State; No. 24 Miami (FL) (6) No. 2 Hawaii	W 3–0; W 3–0; W 3–0; L 3–1
2003	9	First round Second round Regional semifinal	Valparaiso; Dayton (8) No. 8 UCLA	W 3–0; W 3–0; L 3–1
2004	1	First round Second round Regional semifinal Regional final	Iona; Wichita State; No. 15 Louisville (8) No. 8 USC	W 3–0; W 3–0; W 3–0; L 3–2
2005	1	First round Second round Regional semifinal Regional final National semifinal National final	Alabama A&M; Duke (16) No. 16 UCLA (8) No. 4 Florida; No. 11 Santa Clara (3) No. 3 Washington	W 3–0; W 3–0; W 3–0; W 3–0; W 3–0; L 3–0
2006	1	First round Second round Regional semifinal Regional final National semifinal National final	American; Northern Iowa (16) No. 14 San Diego (8) No. 19 Minnesota (4) No. 4 UCLA (2) No. 2 Stanford	W 3–1; W 3–0; W 3–0; W 3–2; W 3–1; W 3–1
2007	2	First round Second round Regional semifinal Regional final	South Dakota State; Wichita State; No. 24 Michigan State (10) No. 6 California	W 3–0; W 3–0; W 3–2; L 3–0
2008	4	First round Second round Regional semifinal Regional final National semifinal	Liberty; UAB; No. 19 Michigan (5) No. 5 Washington (1) No. 1 Penn State	W 3–1; W 3–0; W 3–0; W 3–2; L 3–2
2009	10	First round Second round Regional semifinal Regional final	Coastal Carolina; No. 20 Northern Iowa (7) No. 5 Iowa State (2) No. 2 Texas	W 3–0; W 3–0; W 3–0; L 3–1
2010	2	First round Second round Regional semifinal	Sacred Heart; Auburn; No. 11 Washington	W 3–0; W 3–0; L 3–1
2011	2	First round Second round	Jackson State; Kansas State	W 3–0; L 3–2
2012	4	First round Second round Regional semifinal Regional final	Maryland Eastern Shore; Northern Iowa (13) No. 5 Washington (5) No. 6 Oregon	W 3–0; W 3–0; W 3–0; L 3–1
2013	8	First round Second round Regional semifinal Regional final	Fairfield; No. 25 Oregon (9) No. 8 San Diego (1) No. 1 Texas	W 3–0; W 3–0; W 3–0; L 3–0
2014	14	First round Second round Regional semifinal Regional final	Hofstra; No. 20 Utah (3) No. 3 Washington; No. 12 BYU	W 3–0; W 3–2; W 3–1; L 3–0
2015	4	First round Second round Regional semifinal Regional final National semifinal National final	Harvard; Wichita State (13) No. 11 BYU (5) No. 1 Washington (9) No. 9 Kansas (3) No. 3 Texas	W 3–1; W 3–0; W 3–0; W 3–1; W 3–1; W 3–0
2016	1	First round Second round Regional semifinal Regional final National semifinal	New Hampshire; TCU (16) No. 13 Penn State (8) No. 7 Washington (4) No. 5 Texas	W 3–0; W 3–0; W 3–2; W 3–0; L 3–0
2017	5	First round Second round Regional semifinal Regional final National semifinal National final	Stony Brook; Washington State; Colorado (4) No. 6 Kentucky (1) No. 1 Penn State (2) No. 3 Florida	W 3–0; W 3–0; W 3–0; W 3–1; W 3–2; W 3–1
2018	7	First round Second round Regional semifinal Regional final National semifinal National final	Hofstra; No. 24 Missouri (10) No. 10 Kentucky (15) No. 14 Oregon (3) No. 3 Illinois (1) No. 1 Stanford	W 3–0; W 3–0; W 3–0; W 3–0; W 3–2; L 3–2
2019	5	First round Second round Regional semifinal Regional final	Ball State; Missouri (12) No. 18 Hawaii (4) No. 5 Wisconsin	W 3–0; W 3–1; W 3–0; L 3–0
2020 (Note: The 2020 season was played in the spring of 2021 due to the COVID-19 pandemic.)	5	Second round Regional semifinal Regional final	Texas State (12) No. 12 Baylor (4) No. 4 Texas	W 3–0; W 3–0; L 3–1
2021	10	First round Second round Regional semifinal Regional final National semifinal National final	Campbell; Florida State; Illinois (2) No. 2 Texas (3) No. 3 Pittsburgh (4) No. 4 Wisconsin	W 3–0; W 3–0; W 3–0; W 3–1; W 3–1; L 3–2
2022	2 LOU	First round Second round Regional semifinal	Delaware State; Kansas (3 LOU) No. 9 Oregon	W 3–0; W 3–1; L 3–2
2023	1 LIN	First round Second round Regional semifinal Regional final National semifinal National final	LIU (8 LIN) Missouri (5 LIN) No. 12 Georgia Tech (3 LIN) No. 9 Arkansas (1 PIT) No. 4 Pittsburgh (2 PAL) No. 5 Texas	W 3–0; W 3–0; W 3–0; W 3–1; W 3–0; L 3–0
2024	1 LIN	First round Second round Regional semifinal Regional final National semifinal	Florida A&M (8 LIN) Miami (FL) (5 LIN) No. 23 Dayton (2 LIN) No. 7 Wisconsin (1 UNI) No. 2 Penn State	W 3–0; W 3–0; W 3–1; W 3–0; L 3–2
2025	1 LIN	First round Second round Regional semifinal Regional final	LIU; Kansas State (4 LIN) No. 16 Kansas (3 LIN) No. 9 Texas A&M	W 3–0; W 3–0; W 3–0; L 3–2

== Seasons ==
National champion	National Runner Up	National Semifinalist	Regular season champion	Regular season and tournament champion

Year	Coach	Overall	Conference	Standing	Postseason	Final rank (Note: The American Volleyball Coaches Association began weekly polling in 1982.)
Independent (1975)
1975	Pat Sullivan	34–8			AIAW regional final	
Big Eight Conference (1976–1995)
1976	Pat Sullivan	49–13	5–0	1st	AIAW national tournament	
1977	Terry Pettit	42–12–7	6–1–1	1st	AIAW regional semifinal	
1978	Terry Pettit	35–25–2	3–0	1st	AIAW national tournament	
1979	Terry Pettit	41–8–3	6–0	1st	AIAW regional final	
1980	Terry Pettit	35–15	5–0	1st	AIAW regional final	
1981	Terry Pettit	29–10	12–0	1st		
1982	Terry Pettit	27–6	9–1	1st	NCAA Division I regional semifinal	15
1983	Terry Pettit	29–4	10–0	1st	NCAA Division I first round	16
1984	Terry Pettit	27–4	10–0	1st	NCAA Division I regional final	7
1985	Terry Pettit	28–3	10–0	1st	NCAA Division I regional final	6
1986	Terry Pettit	29–6	10–0	1st	NCAA Division I runner-up	6
1987	Terry Pettit	30–5	12–0	1st	NCAA Division I regional final	10
1988	Terry Pettit	28–5	11–1	1st	NCAA Division I regional semifinal	5
1989	Terry Pettit	29–4	12–0	1st	NCAA Division I runner-up	5
1990	Terry Pettit	32–3	12–0	1st	NCAA Division I semifinal	2
1991	Terry Pettit	27–5	12–0	1st	NCAA Division I regional final	7
1992	Terry Pettit	22–6	12–0	1st	NCAA Division I regional semifinal	7
1993	Terry Pettit	25–6	10–2	2nd	NCAA Division I second round	8
1994	Terry Pettit	31–1	12–0	1st	NCAA Division I regional final	1
1995	Terry Pettit	32–1	12–0	1st	NCAA Division I champion	1
Big 12 Conference (1996–2010)
1996	Terry Pettit	30–4	19–1	1st	NCAA Division I semifinal	3
1997	Terry Pettit	27–7	16–4	T–2nd	NCAA Division I regional final	8
1998	Terry Pettit	32–2	19–1	1st	NCAA Division I semifinal	3
1999	Terry Pettit	27–6	17–3	1st	NCAA Division I semifinal	11
2000	John Cook	34–0	20–0	1st	NCAA Division I champion	1
2001	John Cook	31–2	20–0	1st	NCAA Division I semifinal	3
2002	John Cook	31–2	20–0	1st	NCAA Division I regional final	5
2003	John Cook	28–5	17–3	2nd	NCAA Division I regional semifinal	13
2004	John Cook	30–2	20–0	1st	NCAA Division I regional final	5
2005	John Cook	33–2	19–1	1st	NCAA Division I runner-up	2
2006	John Cook	33–1	19–1	1st	NCAA Division I champion	1
2007	John Cook	30–2	19–1	T–1st	NCAA Division I regional final	5
2008	John Cook	31–3	18–2	T–1st	NCAA Division I semifinal	3
2009	John Cook	26–7	16–4	3rd	NCAA Division I regional final	5
2010	John Cook	29–3	19–1	1st	NCAA Division I regional semifinal	7
Big Ten Conference (2011–present)
2011	John Cook	25–5	17–3	1st	NCAA Division I second round	12
2012	John Cook	26–7	15–5	T–2nd	NCAA Division I regional final	7
2013	John Cook	26–7	16–4	2nd	NCAA Division I regional final	7
2014	John Cook	23–10	14–6	4th	NCAA Division I regional final	8
2015	John Cook	32–4	17–3	2nd	NCAA Division I champion	1
2016	John Cook	31–3	18–2	1st	NCAA Division I semifinal	4
2017	John Cook	32–4	19–1	T–1st	NCAA Division I champion	1
2018	John Cook	29–7	15–5	T–3rd	NCAA Division I runner-up	2
2019	John Cook	28–5	17–3	T–2nd	NCAA Division I regional final	5
2020	John Cook	16–3	14–2	3rd	NCAA Division I regional final	6
2021	John Cook	26–8	15–4	2nd	NCAA Division I runner-up	2
2022	John Cook	26–6	16–4	2nd	NCAA Division I regional semifinal	9
2023	John Cook	33–2	19–1	1st	NCAA Division I runner-up	2
2024	John Cook	33–3	19–1	T–1st	NCAA Division I semifinal	4
2025	Dani Busboom Kelly	33–1	20–0	1st	NCAA Division I regional final	3
2026	Dani Busboom Kelly	28-0	17-0	1st		
Total:		1560–273–12 (.849)				
National champion Postseason invitational champion Conference regular season champion Conference regular season and conference tournament champion Division regular season champion Division regular season and conference tournament champion Conference tournament champion

== Olympians ==
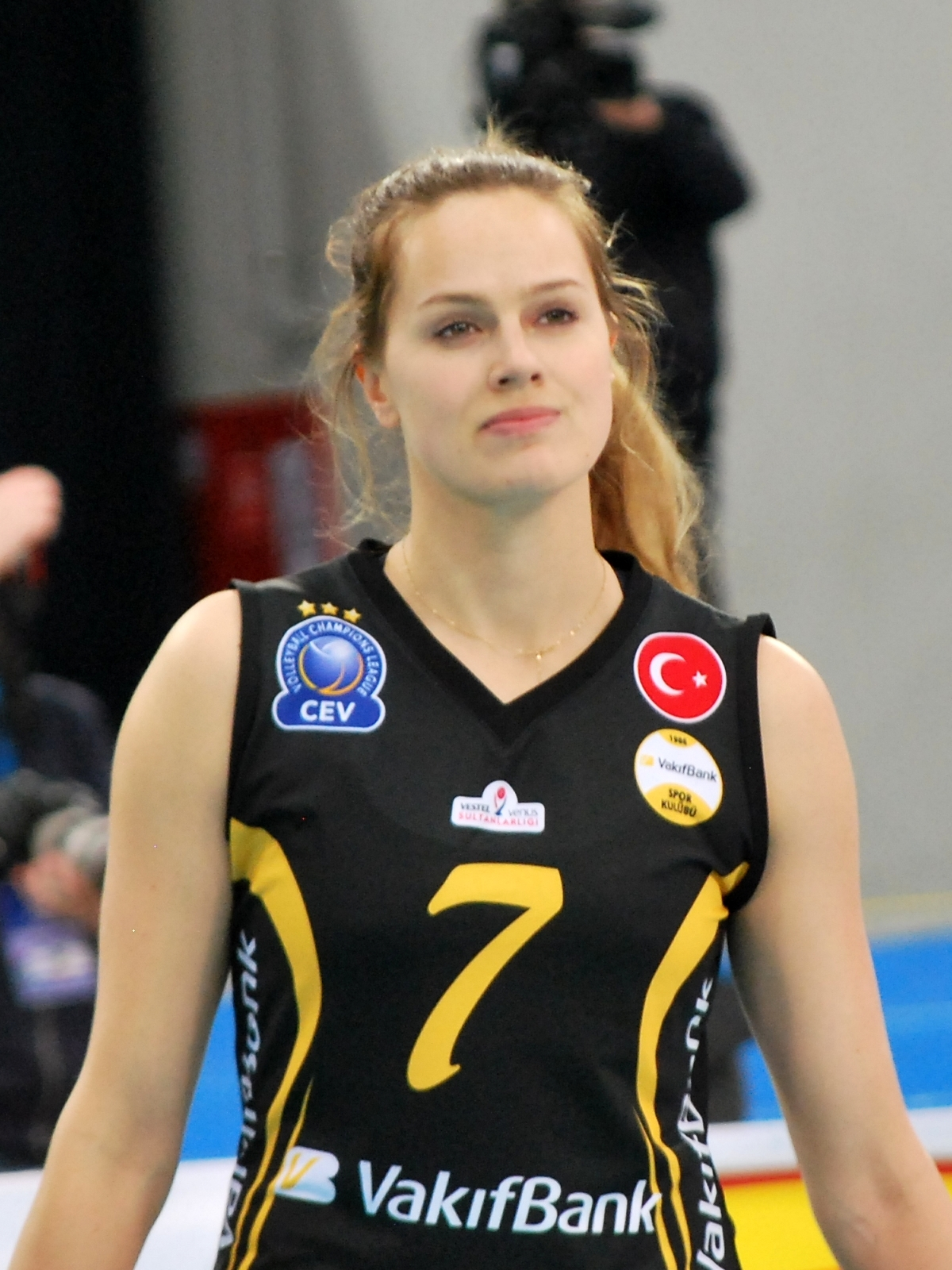
Kelsey Robinson won three Olympic medals as a member of the United States national team

Eight athletes and two coaches have combined to represent Nebraska in eighteen Summer Olympic Games. Four-time medalist Jordan Larson, considered one of the best players in United States national team history, was joined by Kelsey Robinson and Justine Wong-Orantes in Tokyo in 2020, when the United States won its first indoor volleyball Olympic gold medal.

Olympiad	City	Athlete (Note: Cathy Noth served as an alternate on the 1988 United States Olympic team.)	Country	Finish
1992 (XXV)	(Spain) Barcelona	Lori Endicott	United States	(bronze) Third place
1992 (XXV)	(Spain) Barcelona	John Cook (asst. coach)	United States	(bronze) Third place
1996 (XXVI)	(United States) Atlanta	Lori Endicott	United States	Seventh place
2000 (XXVII)	(Australia) Sydney	Allison Weston	United States	Fourth place
2004 (XXVIII)	(Greece) Athens	Nancy Metcalf	United States	Quarterfinal
2012 (XXX)	(United Kingdom) London	Jordan Larson	United States	(silver) Runner-up
2016 (XXXI)	(Brazil) Rio de Janeiro	Kayla Banwarth	United States	(bronze) Third place
2016 (XXXI)	(Brazil) Rio de Janeiro	Jordan Larson	United States	(bronze) Third place
2016 (XXXI)	(Brazil) Rio de Janeiro	Kelsey Robinson	United States	(bronze) Third place
2020 (XXXII)	(Japan) Tokyo	Jordan Larson	United States	(gold) Champion
2020 (XXXII)	(Japan) Tokyo	Kelsey Robinson	United States	(gold) Champion
2020 (XXXII)	(Japan) Tokyo	Justine Wong-Orantes	United States	(gold) Champion
2024 (XXXIII)	(France) Paris	Jordan Larson	United States	(silver) Runner-up
2024 (XXXIII)	(France) Paris	Kelsey Robinson	United States	(silver) Runner-up
2024 (XXXIII)	(France) Paris	Justine Wong-Orantes	United States	(silver) Runner-up
2028 (XXXIV)	(United States) Los Angeles			
