= Karen Dahlgren Schonewise =

American volleyball player and coach

Personal information
- Nationality: United States
- Education: Nebraska

Volleyball information
- Position: Middle blocker

Karen Dahlgren Schonewise (née Dahlgren) is a retired volleyball player, who played collegiately for Nebraska.

== Early life ==
Dahlgren was born to Robert and Betty Dahlgren and grew up in Bertrand, Nebraska. She attended Bertrand High School, where she excelled athletically, earning all-state honors for both basketball and volleyball, while winning the Nebraska 100-meter low hurdles event in both 1981 and 1982.

== College ==
Dahlgren started her collegiate volleyball career at Nebraska in 1983, playing for Terry Pettit. Between her sophomore and junior years, she participated on the Junior National Team at the World University Games in Japan. She noticed a particular formation run by the team from Korea, called the slide attack, which she brought back to the US. She is credited as the first college player to run this formation in the US which occurred in 1986. When she was a junior, she helped lead the team as a middle blocker to their first NCAA title game in 1986 at the 1986 NCAA Division I women's volleyball tournament. Nebraska beat Stanford in the national semi-finals, setting up the title match against the reigning national champions, Pacific. However, Pacific would prevail once again. Dahlgren played well enough to earn a spot on the all-tournament team.

Her play earned her a spot of the all-conference team all four years of her collegiate career. At the time she was inducted into the Nebraska High School Sports Hall of Fame (1999), she was the only player at Nebraska to hold that honor. In 1986, she won the Honda-Broderick Award (now the Honda Sports Award) as the nation's best female collegiate volleyball player.

In 2003, Nebraska retired her No. 13 jersey. In 2005, Nebraska created a list of the top 100 athletes to play for the school. Dahlgren was number 40 on the list.

When she was asked about her best moment in her playing career, she responded, "I'm not sure there was one. I just loved practice. Games are fun, but practice allows you to work on the things you need to do to get better."

== Professional ==
Dahlgren competed in the US based professional volleyball league Major League Volleyball (which lasted from 1987 to 1989). She was the first player chosen in their initial draft in 1986.She played for both the Minnesota Monarchs and the New York Liberties.

== Coaching ==
She was the volleyball coach at Kansas between 1994 and 1997.

== Awards and honors ==
- 1999 Inducted into Nebraska High School Sports Hall of Fame
- 1987 CoSIDA Academic All-American
- 1987 Honda Sports Award
- 2017 Inducted into the University of Nebraska Athletic Hall of Fame
- June 25, 2024 Honorary Grand Marshal of the 74th Annual Bertrand Days Fair & Rodeo, Bertrand, NE
