= McLinden =

McLinden is a surname. Notable people with the surname include:

- Dursley McLinden (1965–1995), Manx actor
- Mark McLinden (born 1979), Australian rugby union and rugby league player
- Melissa McLinden (born 1964), American volleyball player
- Paul McLinden, Scottish musician and songwriter
