= California Golden Bears women's volleyball =

College women's volleyball team

- University: University of California, Berkeley
- Head coach: Jen Malcom (1st season)
- Conference: ACC
- Location: Berkeley, California, US
- Home arena: Haas Pavilion (capacity: 11,877)
- Nickname: Bears
- Colors: Blue and gold

AIAW/NCAA tournament runner-up
- 2010

AIAW/NCAA tournament semifinal
- 2007, 2010

AIAW/NCAA tournament appearance
- 1981, 1982, 1983, 1987, 1988, 1989, 2002, 2003, 2004, 2005, 2006, 2007, 2008, 2009, 2010, 2011, 2012, 2013

Conference regular season champion
- 1982, 2010

The California Golden Bears women's volleyball team is the intercollegiate women's volleyball team of the University of California, Berkeley. The team plays its home games at Haas Pavilion, which was built on top of the old Harmon Gymnasium using money donated in part by the owners of Levi-Strauss. The arena was originally known as Men's Gymnasium and then later Harmon Gymnasium until the late 1990s when it went through massive renovations, which displaced the team for two seasons. The California volleyball program has seen great success in recent years, reaching the final four in 2007, winning the Pac-10 championship in 2010, and finishing as the runner-up in the NCAA tournament in 2010. The current head coach is Jen Malcom, who began her tenure in 2024.

== History ==
=== Golden Age (2007–2010) ===
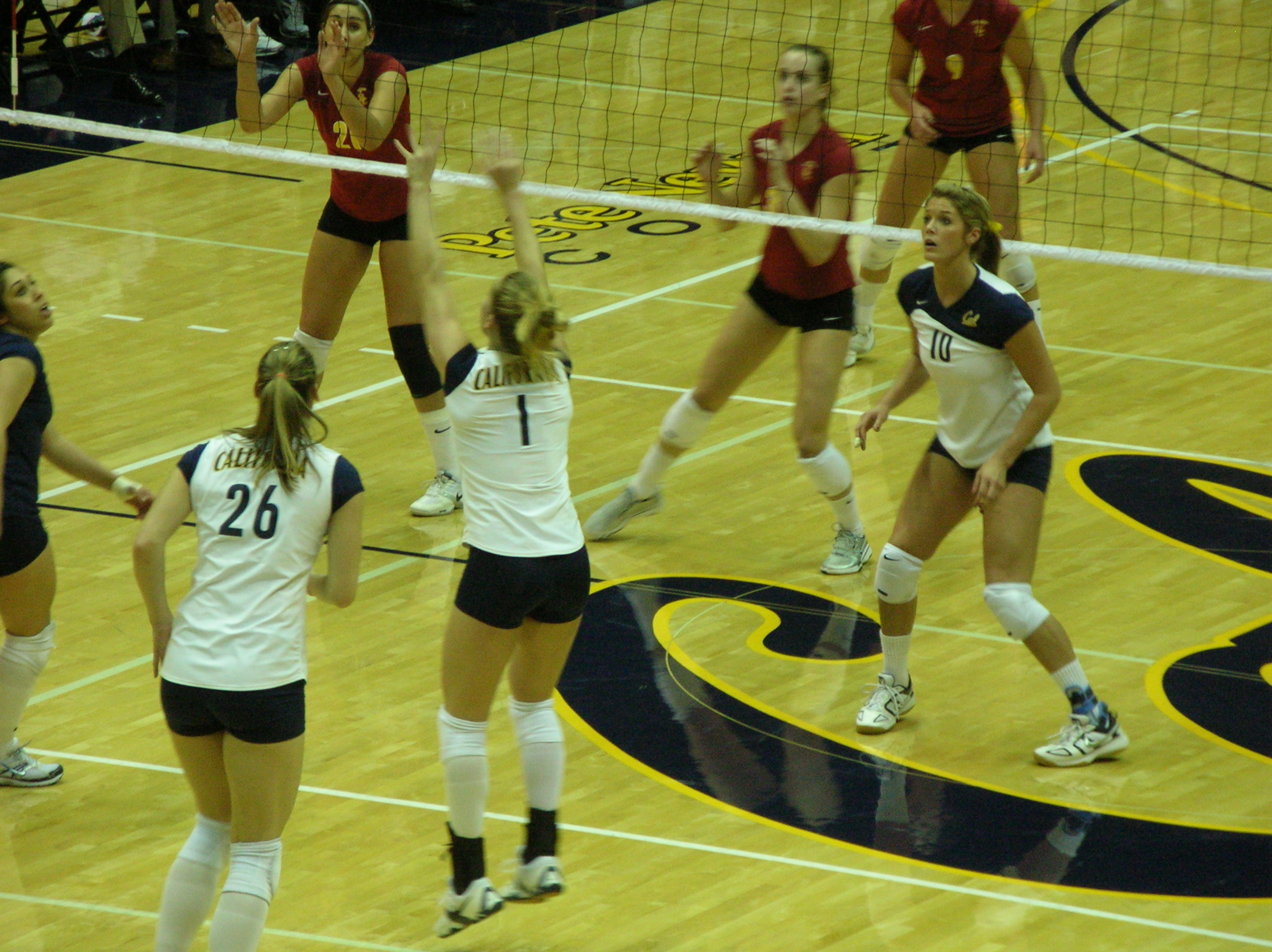
The women's volleyball team faces off against Southern California in November 2008

In 2007, Cal reached the final four for the first time in school history before falling to eventual national champion Penn State in the semifinals. Not only did they reach the final four, in their run they were able to defeat defending champion and #2 seed Nebraska, who were the favorites to repeat as champions, in the regional final round, in a sweep (3–0).

In that same year, Senior outside hitter Angie Pressey, the daughter of NBA player Paul Pressey, garnered AVCA First Team All-American honors and was the only Cal player in history to be named to the Pac-10 All-Conference team all four years. Hana Cutura was named the 2007 regional MVP for her helping Cal reach the final four.

In 2008 and 2009, the Bears got back to the NCAA tournament, but failed to reach their 2007 success due to 3–0 losses to Penn State in the Elite Eight.

Cal completed its most successful season in 2010, as they won the Pac-10 title for the first time in school history and advanced to the 2010 NCAA Championship final, where they fell to Penn State. Senior setter Carli Lloyd was named the 2010 AVCA National Player of the Year and then head coach Rich Feller was named the National Coach of the Year.

=== Struggles, rebuild, and coaching change (2011–2017) ===
The Bears failed to replicate their 2010 success the following year despite going 27–7 during the regular season. They made the NCAA tournament, but lost to the North Carolina Tar Heels in the first round, ending their season.

2012 was a similar season for the Bears, as their season ended with yet another first round loss in the tournament to North Carolina. They finally were able to make it past the first round of the tournament vs the Heels the following season, but were swept by the Wisconsin Badgers.

From 2014 to 2016, the Bears struggled, finishing last in the Pac-12 two of those years despite having strong players like Janelle Jordan and Lara Vukasovic. Despite the additions of star freshmen Maddie Haynes, Kat Knop, and Bailee Huizenga for the 2016 season, the struggles continued. After a disappointing 2016 season, which saw the Bears going 9–21 on the year, Feller announced his retirement, and his assistant Matt McShane took over as head coach.

McShane's first season as head coach did not go well, even with the addition of star recruits in outside hitter Mima Mirkovic, middle blockers Preslie Anderson and Lauren Forte, and transfer libero Emma Smith. While the former two and star senior outside hitter Christine Alftin did well, the team struggled with injuries to many of their star players, including Alftin and Smith, which left them out of the NCAA tournament for a third straight year. McShane was terminated towards the end of the season, forcing associate head coach Jennifer Dorr to take the helm, which she did through the 2018 season.

=== Improvements and second coaching change (2018) ===
Dorr had a goal to return to the NCAA tournament and gain the Bears' reputation as a good team back. Mirkovic had an outstanding season, with 15 double-doubles on the year and 3.46 kills/set, the most on the team, along with 405 kills. Coach Dorr implored a 6–2 offense, with sophomore Isabel Potter and freshman Jade Blevins at setter, while making Smith their primary libero. Despite the success of Mirkovic and their new freshmen, notably Blevins, libero Gabby Bellizzi, and middle blocker Bella Bergmark, the Bears missed the tournament for a fourth straight year despite finishing only one game below .500.

After signing two recruits: Turkish outside hitter Deniz Milli and Villa Park High School opposite Sydney Lilomaiava that November, Dorr was left searching for a job as the Bears went on looking for a permanent coach. Dorr was not considered to take over the job, as Cal athletic director Jim Knowlton had other plans for their situation in order to help them return to national prominence.

=== Beginning of Sam Crosson Era (2019) ===
On December 20, 2018, Knowlton announced that Cal had hired Sam Crosson as the new head coach of the program. Crosson already had connections to the program, as he was an assistant under Feller for the 2010 and '11 seasons before spending 7 years as the head coach of Cal Poly. He kept Dorr on as his associate, and the Bears improved drastically. They went 10–0 in non conference play before losing to Stanford in Haas, then went on to win the next 7 games to improve to 17–1, with their biggest win coming against then-18th ranked Utah Utes. Mirkovic put down 18 kills and scored the game winning kill in that game. In the game against Colorado two days later, she had a career-high 19 kills, including another game-winner. It led to her receiving Cal's second PAC 12 offensive player of the Week honor. She was awarded the AVCA National Player of the Week honor that same week, the first player to earn the award since Carli Lloyd in 2010 and the fourth player overall, joining Lloyd ('08 and '10), Mia Jerkov ('02), and Cutura ('09), cementing herself as one of Cal's legends. After losses to UCLA and USC in LA and Oregon at home, the Bears won three more games, reaching their first 20-win season since 2013, which made it very likely that they would come back to the NCAA tournament.

Unfortunately, during the first set of the team's penultimate home game against UCLA, Mirkovic took a shot to the head off a kill from UCLA's outside hitter Jenny Mosser, but remained in the game. Towards the end of the first set, while going up for a kill, she went down with an ankle injury, which led her to miss four games. The Bears lost both the UCLA game 3–0 and their Senior Day game against USC 3–1 despite Haynes' 20 kills in the latter game, and couldn't get the season sweep of Colorado and Utah on the road in 3–1 losses.

Despite Mirkovic's return against Washington, the Bears lost both that game and the game against Stanford, ending their season 20–10 overall, 10–10 in conference. Because only the top six Pac-12 teams make NCAA's, the Bears missed it for a fifth straight year, just one spot shy of sixth place. Despite the disappointing end to the season, it was the first time that Cal was ever in the top 25 since 2013, with their highest ranking being 14th in the country during the middle of the season. Mirkovic finished with 13 double-doubles, the eighth most in the Pac-12, along with 325 kills (.242 hitting and 3.28 kills/set), 20 aces, and 289 digs, putting her six kills shy of 1000, and was named to the AVCA Pacific North All-Region team. Along with Anderson and Forte, she was also named to the All-Pac 12 team, while Haynes received an honorable mention.

The loss of Haynes, Huizenga, Smith, and Rennie were tough for Cal, but they signed six freshmen and Arizona transfer Katie Smoot to the roster during the off-season that was cut short due to the COVID-19 pandemic. After Pac-12 commissioner Larry Scott announced the postponement of all fall sports due to the pandemic, both Anderson and Forte announced via social media that they were a semester away from graduating and were transferring to Baylor and Florida, respectively for next season. The announcements came as a big blow for Cal, as they were left with only two middles whom were inexperienced, putting pressure on Mirkovic and Potter to stay with the team.

=== COVID season (2020) ===
In November 2020, Scott announced that the 2020 PAC-12 volleyball season would be played in spring 2021, on a 22-game conference only schedule. Though Cal appeared to be the team that would improve from last season and make the NCAA tournament, Crosson announced that Potter was staying, but also stated that Mirkovic and Smoot, who play both indoor and beach volleyball, were opting out to play beach. In turn, it forced newly signed freshman Kat Pantovic and the other newcomers to fill the holes left by their departure and the departure of Anderson and Forte at the end of last season. During the first series vs UCLA, Pantovic, Lilomaiava, and middle blocker Lydia Grote gave their all for the team, but it was all for naught as Cal lost the first game of the series 3–1 and were swept in the second, which was very reminiscent of last season. The series against Utah wasn't much better, as the middles were shut down in both games despite Grote's 9 kills in the first game, and Pantovic's absence from the second game due to a pulled muscle did not help their cause. In the series against Colorado, Cal came knocking on the door and forced the game to 5 sets, but ended up losing despite stellar performances from Pantovic and Lilomaiava. It didn't help that libero Tara Desa had gone on COVID protocol and that starting libero Lexi Gruszczynski and backup setter Blevins were injured. The team could not replicate their efforts in the second game, losing 3–0, as errors and poor hitting efficiency doomed the Bears, who were unable to stop the Buffs' Elissa Alcantara and Sterling Parker. Aside from Lilomaiava's 7 kills, everyone else did not do that well, a sign that losing Mirkovic was going to make it hard for them to replicate their 2019 success. On February 12, 2021, Cal managed to beat a depleted Stanford team in Haas in 5 sets behind Pantovic's first double-double (16 kills, 11 digs) and Bergmark's .348 hitting percentage for their first win of the season and their first win vs Stanford since 2011. They could not complete the sweep two days later, losing in straight sets to split the series with the Cardinal due to poor defense and Stanford's blocking prowess. The USC series, despite being a hard-fought one, resulted in 3–1 losses both times for the Bears, dropping them further down the standings. In the series against Washington State, the Bears were swept both times, dropping to 1–11 on the season despite having an overall winning record against the Cougars. Though they fought hard both times, the WSU block stifled Cal despite Grote's 11 kills in the second game, proving that Cal's NCAA hopes seemed all but impossible. To make matters worse, Potter injured her left hand in the second game of the series while going up for a block, leaving her unable to set, and Bellizzi was also injured in the first game of the series as well, forcing fellow libero Jessica Houghton to take over at the position. Potter's absence forced freshman Kendall Jensen to take the reins at setter and the Bears suffered uncharacteristic losses (3–2 in game 1 and 3–0 in game 2) to the OSU Beavers, a team they have a winning record against, despite strong performances by Grote in both games. Pantovic recorded her second double-double in the first game, but had only 6 kills and 7 digs in the second to go with her first solo block, and Lilomaiava's poor performance in game 2 of the series didn't help their cause. The series vs the ASU Sun Devils wasn't much better despite Grote's 13 kills in the second game, resulting in 3–0 sweep losses both times. Pantovic did uncharacteristically poor in both games, and Lilomaiava struggled to find consistency offensively, which did not help despite her improved blocking numbers.

Because the Bears were able to win at home before, it was thought that they would be able to take down Arizona at Haas, but they were again swept 3–0 both times despite Grote's double-digit kill performances in both games. Cal's offense struggled, as Bergmark, Pantovic and Lilomaiava could not find consistency at the net and were unable to stop the Wildcats' offensive firepower outsides Sofia Maldonado Diaz and Paige Whipple. It was clear that Potter's injury was the nail in the coffin in an already disappointing season for the Bears, and Jensen's inexperience was making it even harder for them as a team to produce the way they could before Potter went down. Despite stellar performances from Pantovic and Grote, the Blue and Gold could not get past a red-hot Oregon lineup, losing the series in 3–0 sweeps. They couldn't regain a winning momentum against UW in their last games of the season, losing both games 3–0 despite strong performances from Meyer and Grote. This left them with a season-worst 1–21 record, one that would have probably not existed given better circumstances. In spite of that, Grote was named to the Pac 12 All-freshman team, making her the only Bear to receive honors in the spring 2021 (2020) season.

=== Pandemic season (2021) ===
The loss of Potter and Houghton were tough for Cal, and Meyer ended up graduating early to pursue a master's degree at Georgetown, which did not help from a veteran standpoint. However, Mirkovic announced that she would be returning for the fall 2021 season. The team also signed Utah transfer Leah Schmidt to go with their 4 incoming freshmen that would fill the void left by the losses of Potter and Houghton, as well as the earlier losses of Forte and Anderson in fall 2020. Smoot's name was still listed when the fall 2021 roster came out, which proved that she, too would be back for the Bears in fall 2021. During the games vs Alabama A &M and northwestern state, the bears won two times but lost to Tulane. They beat the pacific tourney teams and Nevada three times, but a loss to ndsu hurt them. Losing to Butler and UC Davis were bad even though they beat St Mary's college 3–1. They ended up losing to Stanford 3–1 despite fighting hard at a raucous Maples pavilion and Mirkovic and Smoot doing well for the team overall, leaving them 0–1 to start conference play and 7–5 overall. An injury to Grote and a concussion protocol injury for Pantovic certainly didn't help them at all, even though both were ok to play. A loss to USC left them 0–2 to start conference matches, as the USC block was too much to handle. They could not regain a win after the home game vs Arizona nor ASU as the Cats were unstoppable the whole night, especially in the front row, and poor defense vs ASU didn't help their cause. Nevertheless, the sets were much closer than vs USC overall. Losses to the Oregon schools did not help their cause, predicting changes by the off-season by an 0–6 conference start. A set of sweep losses to Colorado and Utah did not help them either despite Grote's career and match high 21 kills in the latter game, putting them 0–8 in conference play. In addition, Mirkovic was wearing tape on her left knee vs Utah, a sign she was injured, and was limited to only playing libero or sitting out entirely, so was forced to only be the libero for the match.

The series vs the Washington schools was different both times, but the Bears lost to UW 3–1 in a sisterly matchup (Grote and her sister Marin) and 3–0 to a tough-blocking Cougar team, falling to 0–10 on the conference season. An injury to Mirkovic dropped them down to 0–12 after sweep losses to the Arizona schools, and Mirkovic's absence certainly didn't help down the stretch. They still could not get a win vs the Oregon schools, making it likely changes would be in order, and losses to WSU and made things worse.

=== Recent seasons (2022–present) ===
The women's volleyball team playing against South Carolina in September 2026

After another winless season in conference in 2022, head coach Sam Crosson resigned prior to the 2023 season. He was replaced by interim head coach Crissy Jones Schoonderwoerd.

In December 2023, Jen Malcom was hired to be the next coach of the Cal women's volleyball team. In 2024, Cal played their first season as a member of the Atlantic Coast Conference.

== Season-by-season results ==
Record table
Season	Coach	Overall	Conference	Standing	Postseason
Chris Stanley (NCIAC/NorCal/NorPac) (1975–1983)
1975	Chris Stanley	6–8	—	4th (NCIAC)	—
1976	Chris Stanley	7–8	—	4th (NCIAC)	—
1977	Chris Stanley	18–8	8–4	3rd (NorCal)	—
1978	Chris Stanley	17–18	7–5	4th (NorCal)	—
1979	Chris Stanley	18–8	8–4	2nd (NorCal)	—
1980	Chris Stanley	19–16	6–6	4th (NorCal)	—
1981	Chris Stanley	20–21	7–5	3rd (NorCal)	1–3 (AIAW)
1982	Chris Stanley	28–12	12–2	1st (NorPac)	1–1 (NCAA second round)
1983	Chris Stanley	22–20	7–2	3rd (NorPac)	1–1 (NCAA second round)
Chris Stanley:		155–119 (.566)	55–28 (.663)		
Marlene Piper (NorPac/Pac-10) (1984–1987)
1984	Marlene Piper	13–23	5–7	3rd (NorPac)	—
1985*	Marlene Piper	12–31*	7–5*	3rd (NorPac)	—
1986	Marlene Piper	18–21	7–11	7th (Pac-10)	—
1987	Marlene Piper	18–15	11–7	T–4th (Pac-10)	0–1 (NCAA first round)
Marlene Piper:		61–90 (.404)	30–30 (.500)		
Dave DeGroot (Pac-10) (1988–1994)
1988	Dave DeGroot	19–15	7–11	7th (Pac-10)	0–1 (NCAA first round)
1989	Dave DeGroot	19–13	8–10	T-6th (Pac-10)	1–1 (NCAA second round)
1990	Dave DeGroot	8–21	3–15	10th (Pac-10)	—
1991	Dave DeGroot	15–15	9–9	5th (Pac-10)	3–1 (NIVC)
1992	Dave DeGroot	11–16	6–12	7th (Pac-10)	—
1993	Dave DeGroot	13–16	5–13	8th (Pac-10)	—
1994	Dave DeGroot	5–23	2–16	9th (Pac-10)	—
Dave DeGroot:		90–119 (.431)	11–47 (.190)		
Sue Woodstra (Pac-10) (1995–1998)
1995	Sue Woodstra	13–15	5–13	9th (Pac-10)	—
1996	Sue Woodstra	8–20	3–15	9th (Pac-10)	—
1997	Sue Woodstra	8–19	3–15	9th (Pac-10)	—
1998	Sue Woodstra	3–9	0–4		
Sue Woodstra:		32–63 (.337)	11–47 (.190)		
Lee Maes (Pac-10) (1998–1998)
1998	Lee Maes	4–13	3–11	T–8th (Pac-10)	—
Lee Maes:		4–13 (.235)	3–11 (.214)		
Rich Feller (Pac-10/Pac-12) (1999–2016)
1999	Rich Feller	13–15	7–11	T–6th (Pac-10)	—
2000	Rich Feller	13–15	6–12	T–7th (Pac-10)	—
2001	Rich Feller	10–18	3–15	9th (Pac-10)	—
2002	Rich Feller	20–12	7–11	8th (Pac-10)	1–1 (NCAA second round)
2003	Rich Feller	25–7	12–6	T–3rd (Pac-10)	2–1 (NCAA Sweet Sixteen)
2004	Rich Feller	17–12	11–7	T–4th (Pac-10)	1–1 (NCAA second round)
2005	Rich Feller	19–11	10–8	T–5th (Pac-10)	1–1 (NCAA second round)
2006	Rich Feller	22–10	9–9	5th (Pac-10)	2–1 (NCAA second round)
2007	Rich Feller	26–8	12–6	4th (Pac-10)	4–1 (NCAA Final Four)
2008	Rich Feller	26–7	13–5	3rd (Pac-10)	3–1 (NCAA Elite Eight)
2009	Rich Feller	21–11	11–7	4th (Pac-10)	3–1 (NCAA Elite Eight)
2010	Rich Feller	30–4	15–3	T-1st (Pac-10)	5–1 (NCAA Runners Up)
2011	Rich Feller	26–7	16–6	3rd (Pac-12)	0–1 (NCAA first round)
2012	Rich Feller	15–16	9–11	T–6th (Pac-12)	0–1 (NCAA first round)
2013	Rich Feller	18-13	10-10	T-5th (Pac-12)	1-1 (NCAA second round)
2014	Rich Feller	10-20	2-18	11th (Pac-12)	
2015	Rich Feller	9-22	3-17	12th (Pac-12)	
2016	Rich Feller	9-21	3-17	12th (Pac-12)	
Rich Feller:		318-176 (.649)	152–126(.547)		
Matt McShane (Pac-12) (2017–2017)
2017	Matt McShane	13-18	4-16	11th (Pac-12)	
Matt McShane:		13-18 (.419)	4-16 (.200)		
Jennifer Dorr (interim) (Pac-12) (2018–2018)
2018	Jennifer Dorr (interim)	15-16	7-13	10th (Pac-12)	
Jennifer Dorr ( interim):		15-16 (.484)	7-13 (.350)		
Sam Crosson (Pac-12) (2019–present)
2019	Sam Crosson	20-10 (.667)	10-10 (.500)	7th (Pac-12)	
2020**	Sam Crosson	1-21 (.045)	1-21 (.045)	12th (Pac-12)	
2021	Sam Crosson	7-24 (.226)	0-20 (.000)	12th (Pac-12)	
2022	Sam Crosson	7-23 (.233)	0-20 (.000)	12th (Pac-12)	
Crissy Jones Schoonderwoerd (interim) (Pac-12) (2023–2023)
2023	Crissy Jones Schoonderwoerd (interim)	16-15 (.516)	5-15 (.250)	10th (Pac-12)	
Crissy Jones Schoonderwoerd (interim):		16-15 (.516)	5-15 (.250)		
Jen Malcom (ACC) (2024–present)
2024	Jen Malcom	15-17 (.469)	7-13 (.350)	12th (ACC)	
Total:		733–730 (.501)			
National champion Postseason invitational champion Conference regular season champion Conference regular season and conference tournament champion Division regular season champion Division regular season and conference tournament champion Conference tournament champion

*Includes 11 forfeits due to ineligible players. **Played in spring 2021 on a conference-only schedule due to the COVID-19 pandemic.

Source: 2011 Golden Bears Record Book, 2013 Golden Bears Record Book

== Coaches ==
Head Coach	Years	Win–loss	Pct.
Chris Stanley	1975–1983	155–119	.566
Marlene Piper	1984–1987	61–90	.404
Dave DeGroot	1988–1994	90–119	.431
Sue Woodstra	1995–1998	32–63	.337
Lee Maes (Interim)	1998	4–13	.235
Rich Feller	1999–2016	268–137	.662
Matt McShane	2017	15–18	.419
Jennifer Dorr (interim)	2018	15–16	.484
Sam Crosson	2019–	21–31	.404

== Roster ==
Current Roster

No.	Name	Position	Height	Year	Hometown	High school
1	Katarina (Kat) Pantovic ⛑	Outside Hitter	6–0	SO	Vancouver, BC, Canada	Lord Byng
2	Darian Clark	Outside Hitter/Libero	5–11	SR	Phoenix, AZ	Hamilton HS
3	Mima Mirkovic	Outside Hitter	5–11	SR	Irvine, CA	Woodbridge
5	Leah Schmidt	Outside Hitter	6–3	SO	Westlake, Ohio	Westlake High/Utah
7	Gabby Bellizi	Libero	5–6	SR	Ladera Ranch, CA	San Juan Hills
8	Deniz Milli	Outside Hitter	6–0	JR	Istanbul, Turkey	Enka Schools
9	Ellie Hamm	Middle Blocker	6–4	FR	Merced, CA	Merced High
10	Sarah Schrag	Libero	5–9	FR	San Diego, CA	The Bishop's School
11	Kendall Jensen	Setter/Defensive Specialist	5–8	SO	Burbank, CA	Village Christian
12	Lydia Grote	Middle Blocker	6–2	SO	Burbank, CA	John Burroughs HS
13	Tara Desa	Libero	5–5	SO	Mililani, HI	Kamehameha
14	Jade Blevins	Setter	5–10	SR	Laguna Beach, CA	Sage Hill
15	Bella Bergmark	Middle Blocker	6–2	R-JR	Larkspur, CA	Marin Catholic
16	Sam Taumoepeau	Outside Hitter/Opposite	6–0	SO	San Diego, CA	Mt. Carmel
17	Annalea Maeder	Setter	6–1	FR	Basel, Switzerland	Gymnasium Baumlihof
20	Katie Smoot⛑	Outside Hitter	6–2	SR	San Mateo, CA	NDB/Arizona
22	Ava Mehrten	Opposite	6–1	FR	Alamo, CA	Carondelet
24	Sydney Lilomaiava	Opposite	6–3	JR	Orange, CA	Villa Park HS

⛑-injured

== Postseason ==
The California Golden Bears have an NCAA Division I Tournament record of 26–17 through seventeen appearances.

Year	Round	Opponent	Result
1982	First round Regional semifinals	Pepperdine; San Diego State	W 3–0; L 1–3
1983	First round Regional semifinals	Oregon State; Pacific	W 3–2; L 0–3
1987	First round	UCLA	L 1–3
1988	First round	UCLA	L 0–3
1989	First round Regional semifinals	Florida State; Texas	W 3–1; L 0–3
2002	First round Second round	Santa Clara; UC Santa Barbara	W 3–1; L 0–3
2003	First round Second round Regional semifinals	Saint Mary's; Michigan; Georgia Tech	W 3–0; W 3–0; L 1–3
2004	First round Second round	Pacific; Saint Mary's	W 3–2; L 2–3
2005	First round Second round	Valparaiso; Wisconsin	W 3–0; L 0–3
2006	First round Second round Regional semifinals	LSU; Cal Poly; Stanford	W 3–0; W 3–1; L 0–3
2007	First round Second round Regional semifinals Regional Finals; Semifinals	Liberty; Duke; Iowa State; Nebraska; Penn State	W 3–1; W 3–1; W 3–0; W 3–0; L 0–3
2008	First round Second round Regional semifinals Regional Finals	Siena; New Mexico State; Illinois; Penn State	W 3–0; W 3–1; W 3–0; L 0–3
2009	First round Second round Regional semifinals Regional Finals	Lipscomb; Ohio State; Baylor; Penn State	W 3–0; W 3–1; W 3–0; L 0–3
2010	First round Second round Regional semifinals Regional Finals; Semifinals; National Championship	Utah State; North Carolina; Minnesota; Washington; USC; Penn State	W 3–0; W 3–0; W 3–0; W 3–0; W 3–0; L 0–3
2011	First round	North Carolina	L 2–3
2012	First round	North Carolina	L 1–3
2013	First round Second round	North Carolina; Wisconsin	W 3–0; L 0–3

== See also ==
- List of NCAA Division I women's volleyball programs
