= Rudy Suwara =

American volleyball player

Personal information
- Full name: Rudolph Suwara
- Nickname: Tasmanian Devil
- Born: November 19, 1941 (age 84); New York City, New York, U.S.
- Height: 6 ft 2 in (188 cm)
- Weight: 200 lb (91 kg)

Volleyball information
- Position: Outside hitter
- Number: 11

National team
1964–1972	United States
Medal record
Men's volleyball
Representing the United States
Pan American Games
Gold medal – first place	1967 Winnipeg	Team
Silver medal – second place	1971 Cali	Team

Rudolph "Rudy" Suwara (born November 19, 1941) is an American former volleyball player who competed with the United States men's national volleyball team at the 1968 Summer Olympics in Mexico City. Suwara won a gold medal with the national team at the 1967 Pan American Games in Winnipeg. He captained the United States team in the early 1970s. Suwara was nicknamed "Tasmanian Devil".

== Coaching ==
Suwara coached the University of California, Santa Barbara (UCSB) men's team from 1971 to 1974. In 1974, UCSB finished second in the NCAA National Championship and won the USVBA Collegiate and Open Division National Championships.

Suwara then coached the San Diego State University (SDSU) women's team from 1976 to 1991, compiling a record of 431–204–3.

In 2012, Suwara was inducted into the AVCA Hall of Fame.

== Personal life ==
Suwara grew up in Spanish Harlem. His brother, Ernie Suwara, played for the United States men's volleyball team at the 1964 Summer Olympics.
