= 1991 NCAA Division I women's volleyball tournament =

Volleyball competition

1991 NCAA women's Division I volleyball tournament
- 1991 NCAA Final Four logo
- Champions: UCLA (3rd NCAA (6th national) title)
- Runner-up: Long Beach State (2nd NCAA (6th national) title match)
- Semifinalists: Ohio State (1st Final Four); LSU (2nd Final Four)
- Winning coach: Andy Banachowski (3rd title)
- Most outstanding player: Natalie Williams (UCLA); Antoinette White (Long Beach State)
- Final Four All-Tournament Team: Natalie Williams (UCLA); Elaine Youngs (UCLA); Angie Miller (UCLA); Antoinette White (Long Beach State); Christine Romero (Long Beach State); Danielle Scott (Long Beach State); Sabrina Hernandez (Long Beach State)

The 1991 NCAA Division I women's volleyball tournament began with 32 teams and ended on December 21, 1991, when UCLA defeated Long Beach State 3 games to 2 in the NCAA championship match.

UCLA won the program's third NCAA title and successfully defended their 1990 NCAA title by defeating Long Beach State in five games. After losing the first two games by the scores of 15-12, 15-13, UCLA completed off a stunning comeback to take the next three games, 15-12, 15-6, 15-11 to win it all.

UCLA's comeback was one of the biggest in NCAA history; only one other team had ever rallied from two games to 0 to win in five games in the NCAA national championship (and did not again until 2009). UCLA finished their season 31-5.

The 1991 Final Four was held on the campus of UCLA at Pauley Pavilion.

== Records ==
| Seed | School | Conference | Berth Type | Record |
|---|---|---|---|---|
| | Bowling Green | Mid-American | Automatic | 29-4 |
| | BYU | WAC | Automatic | 26-4 |
| | Colorado | Big Eight | At-large | 25-9 |
| | Duke | ACC | Automatic | 25-6 |
| | Florida | SEC | Auto (shared) | 33-4 |
| | Fresno State | Big West | At-large | 21-12 |
| | Georgia | SEC | At-large | 28-7 |
| | Hawaii | Big West | At-large | 24-4 |
| | Houston | Southwest | At-large | 20-11 |
| | Illinois | Big Ten | At-large | 19-9 |
| | Long Beach State | Big West | Automatic | 32-1 |
| | Louisville | Metro | Automatic | 28-7 |
| | LSU | SEC | Auto (shared) | 32-1 |
| | Montana | Big Sky | Automatic | 26-3 |
| | Nebraska | Big Eight | Automatic | 25-4 |
| | New Mexico | WAC | At-large | 22-5 |
| | Northern Iowa | Missouri Valley | Automatic | 23-7 |
| | Ohio State | Big Ten | Automatic | 27-3 |
| | Pacific | Big West | At-large | 23-5 |
| | Penn State | Big Ten | At-large | 25-5 |
| | Pepperdine | West Coast | Automatic | 23-7 |
| | Pittsburgh | Big East | Automatic | 28-8 |
| | Rhode Island | Atlantic 10 | Automatic | 19-11 |
| | Southwest Texas State | Southland | Automatic | 21-15 |
| | Stanford | Pac-12 | Automatic | 28-1 |
| | Texas | Southwest | Automatic | 19-9 |
| | Texas Tech | Southwest | At-large | 25-5 |
| | UC Santa Barbara | Big West | At-large | 21-9 |
| | UCLA | Pac-10 | At-large | 26-5 |
| | USC | Pac-10 | At-large | 22-7 |
| | Washington State | Pac-10 | At-large | 19-9 |
| | Wisconsin | Big Ten | At-large | 22-9 |

== Brackets ==
=== West regional ===
First round
Stanford | 3
Rhode Island | 0
Southern California | 3
BYU | 1
UCLA | 3
Pepperdine | 0
Washington State | 1
New Mexico | 3

Regional semifinal
Stanford | 3
Southern California | 2
UCLA | 3
New Mexico | 0

Regional Final
Stanford | 0
UCLA | 3

=== Mideast regional ===
First round
Ohio State | 3
Pittsburgh | 1
Colorado | 2
Penn State | 3
Bowling Green | 0
Wisconsin | 3
Illinois | 0
Nebraska | 3

Regional semifinal
Ohio State | 3
Penn State | 2
Wisconsin | 0
Nebraska | 3

Regional Final
Ohio State | 3
Nebraska | 1

=== South regional ===
First round
LSU | 3
Houston | 0
Texas Tech | 3
Georgia | 0
Texas | 3
Duke | 0
Louisville | 0
Florida | 3

Regional semifinal
LSU | 3
Texas Tech | 0
Texas | 1
Florida | 3

Regional Final
LSU | 3
Florida | 1

=== Northwest regional ===
First round
Hawaiʻi | 3
SW Texas State | 0
Montana | 0
Pacific | 3
UCSB | 3
Fresno State | 0
Northern Iowa | 0
Long Beach State | 3

Regional semifinal
Hawaiʻi | 3
Pacific | 0
UCSB | 0
Long Beach State | 3

Regional Final
Hawaiʻi | 1
Long Beach State | 3

== Final Four - Pauley Pavilion, Los Angeles, California ==
National semifinals
UCLA | 3
Ohio State | 0
LSU | 1
Long Beach State | 3

National championship
UCLA | 3
Long Beach State | 2
