= Melissa McLinden =

American volleyball player (born 1964)

Melissa Therese McLinden (born September 13, 1964) is a former volleyball player. She played for the University of Arizona and for the United States national team at the 1988 Summer Olympics.

She has coached 200+ athletes, won National Qualifiers and has been among the top 10 in the Open Division.
