= 1986 NCAA Division I women's volleyball tournament =

Volleyball competition

1986 NCAA women's Division I volleyball tournament
- Champions: Pacific (2nd title)
- Runner-up: Nebraska (1st title match)
- Semifinalists: Texas (1st Final Four); Stanford (5th Final Four)
- Winning coach: John Dunning (2nd title)
- Final Four All-Tournament Team: Brooke Herrington (Pacific); Liz Hert (Pacific); Teri McGrath (Pacific); Elaina Oden (Pacific); Karen Dahlgren (Nebraska); Tisha Delaney (Nebraska)

The 1986 NCAA Division I women's volleyball tournament began with 32 teams and ended on December 20, 1986, when Pacific defeated Nebraska 3 games to 0 in the NCAA championship match.

Pacific won their second straight NCAA title in volleyball with an easy sweep of Nebraska by the scores of 15-12, 15-4, 15-4.

Nebraska became the first non-California or Hawaii university to make the NCAA national championship match (although it happened six times in the AIAW national championships in the 1970s). Semifinalist Texas joined Nebraska in becoming the first non-California or Hawaii universities to make the NCAA final four (although four such others reached title matches in the 1970s).

== Brackets ==
=== Northwest regional ===
First round
Pacific	3
Idaho State	0
UCSB	1
San Diego State	3
U.S. International	0
Hawaiʻi	3
San Jose State	3
Cal Poly	2

Regional semifinal
Pacific	3
San Diego State	0
Hawaiʻi	3
San Jose State	0

Regional Final
Pacific	3
Hawaiʻi	1

=== South regional ===
First round
UT Arlington	3
Southwest Texas State	1
LSU	3
Arizona	2
Georgia	3
Texas A&M	1
Duke	1
Texas	3

Regional semifinal
UT Arlington	0
LSU	3
Georgia	0
Texas	3

Regional Final
LSU	0
Texas	3

=== Mideast regional ===
First round
Nebraska	3
Pittsburgh	1
Penn State	3
Wyoming	1
Western Michigan	3
Colorado State	0
Illinois	3
Northern Iowa	1

Regional semifinal
Nebraska	3
Penn State	2
Western Michigan	0
Illinois	3

Regional Final
Nebraska	3
Illinois	1

=== West regional ===
First round
UCLA	2
Loyola Marymount	3
Stanford	3
Oregon	1
Arizona State	3
Pepperdine	0
Washington	0
BYU	3

Regional semifinal
Loyola Marymount	0
Stanford	3
Arizona State	1
BYU	3

Regional Final
Stanford	3
BYU	0

== Final Four - Alex G. Spanos Center, Stockton, California ==
National semifinals December 18
Pacific	3
Texas	0
Nebraska	3
Stanford	1

National Championship; December 20
Pacific	3
Nebraska	0

== See also ==
- 1986 NCAA men's volleyball tournament
- 1986 NCAA Division II women's volleyball tournament
- 1986 NCAA Division III women's volleyball tournament
- 1986 NAIA women's volleyball tournament
