= 1989 NCAA Division I women's volleyball tournament =

Volleyball competition

1989 NCAA women's Division I volleyball tournament
- Champions: Long Beach State (1st NCAA (3rd national) title)
- Runner-up: Nebraska (2nd title match)
- Semifinalists: UT Arlington (1st Final Four); UCLA (6th Final Four)
- Winning coach: Brian Gimmillaro (1st title)
- Final Four All-Tournament Team: Tara Cross (Long Beach State); Sheri Sanders (Long Beach State); Antoinette White (Long Beach State); Val Novak (Nebraska); Eileen Shannon (Nebraska); Chris Rudiger (UT Arlington)

The 1989 NCAA Division I women's volleyball tournament began with 32 teams and ended on December 16, 1989, when Long Beach State defeated Nebraska 3 games to 0 in the NCAA championship match.

Led by AVCA co-National Player of the Year Tara Cross's 20 kills, Long Beach State defeated Nebraska 15-12, 15-0, 15-6 to win the school's first NCAA championship. Nebraska made the program's second championship match appearance.

The 1989 Final Four was held at the Neil S. Blaisdell Center in Honolulu, Hawaii.

== Records ==
School	Conference	Berth Type	Record	Regional
Arizona	Pac-10	At-large	17-12	
Cal Poly	Big West	At-large	18-12	
California	Pac-10	At-large	18-10	
Colorado	Big Eight	At-large	22-10	
Eastern Washington	Big Sky	Automatic	25-6	
Florida State	Metro	Automatic	30-4	
Hawaii	Big West	Automatic	27-2	
Houston	Southwest	At-large	25-9	
Illinois	Big Ten	At-large	25-7	
Illinois State	Missouri Valley	Automatic	21-9	
Iowa	Big Ten	At-large	22-10	
Long Beach State	Big West	At-large	22-12	
LSU	SEC	Automatic	29-7	
Minnesota	Big Ten	At-large	28-8	
Nebraska	Big Eight	Automatic	25-3	
North Carolina	ACC	Automatic	21-8	
Ohio State	Big Ten	Automatic	26-6	
Oregon	Pac-10	At-large	21-8	
Pacific	Big West	At-large	28-4	
Penn State	Atlantic 10	Automatic	34-6	
Pepperdine	West Coast	Automatic	20-9	
San Diego State	High Country	At-large	19-17	
San Jose State	Big West	At-large	14-12	
Stanford	Pac-10	At-large	17-11	
Texas	Southwest	Automatic	25-9	
Texas-Arlington	Southland	Automatic	28-3	
UC Santa Barbara	Big West	At-large	22-12	
UCLA	Pac-12	Automatic	27-2	
USC	Pac-10	At-large	19-12	
Washington	Pac-10	At-large	18-8	
Western Michigan	Mid-American	Automatic	18-12	
Wyoming	High Country	Automatic	22-6	

== Brackets ==
=== Northwest regional ===
First round
Hawaiʻi	3
Eastern Washington	0
UCSB	2
Cal Poly	3
Long Beach State	3
San Diego State	0
Pacific	3
San Jose State	0

Regional semifinal
Hawaiʻi	3
Cal Poly	2
Long Beach State	3
Pacific	1

Regional Final
Hawaiʻi	2
Long Beach State	3

=== South regional ===
First round
Texas	3
Western Michigan	0
Florida State	1
California	3
LSU	3
Houston	2
UT Arlington	3
North Carolina	1

Regional semifinal
Texas	3
California	0
LSU	0
UT Arlington	3

Regional Final
Texas	0
UT Arlington	3

=== Mideast regional ===
First round
Nebraska	3
Illinois State	0
Colorado	0
Minnesota	3
Illinois	3
Penn State	0
Ohio State	3
Iowa	0

Regional semifinal
Nebraska	3
Minnesota	1
Illinois	3
Ohio State	2

Regional Final
Nebraska	3
Illinois	1

=== West regional ===
First round
UCLA	3
Pepperdine	1
Oregon	0
Arizona	3
Stanford	3
Southern California	1
Washington	0
Wyoming	3

Regional semifinal
UCLA	3
Arizona	0
Stanford	2
Wyoming	3

Regional Final
UCLA	3
Wyoming	0

== Final Four - Neil S. Blaisdell Center, Honolulu, Hawaii ==
National semifinals December 14
Long Beach State	3
UT Arlington	1
Nebraska	3
UCLA	0

National championship December 16
Long Beach State	3
Nebraska	0

== NCAA tournament records ==
There are 4 NCAA tournaments record that were set in the 1989 NCAA tournament that still stand today.

- Total kill attempts, match (individual record) - Teee Williams, Hawaiʻi - 99 vs. Cal Poly
- Total kills, match (team record) - 112 - UCSB vs. Cal Poly
- Total kill attempts, match (team record) - 328 - UCSB vs. Cal Poly
- Digs, match (team record) - 177 - UCSB vs. Cal Poly
