= 1994 NCAA Division I women's volleyball tournament =

Volleyball competition

1994 NCAA women's Division I volleyball tournament
- 1994 NCAA Final Four logo
- Champions: Stanford (2nd title)
- Runner-up: UCLA (7th NCAA (13th national) title match)
- Semifinalists: Ohio State (2nd Final Four); Penn State (2nd Final Four)
- Winning coach: Don Shaw (2nd title)
- Final Four All-Tournament Team: Marnie Triefenbach (Stanford); Kristin Folkl (Stanford); Cary Wendell (Stanford); Jenny Johnson (UCLA); Annett Buckner (UCLA); Salima Davidson (Penn State)

The 1994 NCAA Division I women's volleyball tournament began with 48 teams and ended on December 17, 1994, when Stanford defeated UCLA 3 games to 1 in the NCAA championship match.

Stanford won the program's second title with the win. Led by freshman Kristin Folkl, Stanford defeated the Bruins 15-10, 5-15, 16-14, 15-13. The meeting with UCLA was the fifth straight year Stanford and UCLA met in the NCAA tournament.

== Play-in games ==
November 22
App State (Southern, 29-5)	3
Towson St. (Big South, 19-14)	0

November 22
SFA (Southland, 31-3)	3
Texas Southern (SWAC, ?)	0

November 26
Idaho (Big Sky, 29-2)	3
Valparaiso (Mid-Cont., 25-10)	0

November 26
UCF (TAAC, 28-9)	3
SE Missouri St. (OVC, 27-13)	0

n/a
Rider (NEC, 19-6)	3
Army (Patriot, 20-15)	2

n/a
Princeton (Ivy, 25-4)	3
Siena (MAAC, 22-9)	0

== Records ==
West Regional
Seed	School	Conference	Berth Type	Record
	Arizona	Pac-10	At-large	15-9
4	Arizona State	Pac-10	At-large	17-9
3	BYU	WAC	Automatic	25-3
	Loyola Marymount	West Coast	Automatic	19-9
	Memphis	Great Midwest	Automatic	26-8
	New Mexico	WAC	At-large	19-9
	San Diego State	WAC	At-large	21-9
1	Stanford	Pac-10	Automatic	27-1
2	USC	Pac-10	At-large	20-7
	Washington	Pac-10	At-large	15-12
	Washington State	Pac-10	At-large	16-12
	Wyoming	WAC	At-large	17-12

Mideast Regional
Seed	School	Conference	Berth Type	Record
	Ball State	Mid-American	Automatic	24-5
4	Colorado	Big Eight	At-large	22-7
	George Washington	Atlantic 10	Automatic	31-3
	Illinois	Big Ten	At-large	23-13
	Iowa	Big Ten	At-large	24-8
1	Nebraska	Big Eight	Automatic	29-0
	Northern Iowa	Missouri Valley	Automatic	27-1
3	Notre Dame	Midwestern Collegiate	Automatic	32-3
2	Penn State	Big Ten	At-large	28-3
	Pittsburgh	Big East	Automatic	20-10
	Rider	Northeast	Automatic	20-6
	Wisconsin	Big Ten	At-large	21-11

Northwest Regional
Seed	School	Conference	Berth Type	Record
	Arkansas State	Sun Belt	Automatic	26-6
3	Hawaii	Big West	At-large	24-4
	Idaho	Big Sky	Automatic	30-2
2	Long Beach State	Big West	Automatic	25-5
	Michigan State	Big Ten	At-large	17-14
	Montana	Big Sky	At-large	24-5
1	Ohio State	Big Ten	Automatic	26-2
4	Pacific	Big West	At-large	22-6
	Princeton	Ivy League	Automatic	26-4
	Texas A&M	Southwest	At-large	18-13
	UC Santa Barbara	Big West	At-large	27-6
	UCF	Trans America	Automatic	29-9

South Regional
Seed	School	Conference	Berth Type	Record
	Appalachian State	Southern	Automatic	30-5
	Clemson	ACC	At-large	27-7
4	Duke	ACC	Automatic	23-5
3	Florida	SEC	Automatic	27-5
	George Mason	CAA	Automatic	30-4
	Georgia	SEC	At-large	25-8
	Georgia Tech	ACC	At-large	25-8
2	Houston	Southwest	Automatic	24-6
	Louisville	Metro	Automatic	29-4
	Stephen F. Austin	Southland	Automatic	32-3
	Texas	Southwest	At-large	22-9
1	UCLA	Pac-10	At-large	28-3

== Brackets ==
=== West regional ===
First round
Washington	3
Wyoming	0
San Diego State	3
Memphis	1
Arizona	3
Loyola Marymount	1
Washington State	1
New Mexico	3

Second round
1	Stanford	3
Washington	0
San Diego State	2
4	Arizona State	3
3	BYU	1
Arizona	3
New Mexico	0
2	Southern California	3

Regional semifinal
1	Stanford	3
4	Arizona State	0
Arizona	0
2	Southern California	3

Regional Final
1	Stanford	3
2	Southern California	0

=== Northwest regional ===
First round
Texas A&M	3
Michigan State	1
UCSB	3
Princeton	0
Idaho	3
Central Florida	0
Arkansas State	1
Montana	3

Second round
1	Ohio State	3
Texas A&M	0
UCSB	2
4	Pacific	3
3	Hawaiʻi	3
Idaho	0
Montana	0
2	Long Beach State	3

Regional semifinal
1	Ohio State	3
4	Pacific	1
3	Hawaiʻi	2
2	Long Beach State	3

Regional Final
1	Ohio State	3
2	Long Beach State	1

=== Mideast regional ===
First round
George Washington	3
Wisconsin	2
Northern Iowa	3
Rider	0
Iowa	2
Pittsburgh	3
Ball State	3
Illinois	2

Second round
1	Nebraska	3
George Washington	0
Northern Iowa	1
4	Colorado	3
3	Notre Dame	3
Pittsburgh	1
Ball State	0
2	Penn State	3

Regional semifinal
1	Nebraska	3
4	Colorado	0
3	Notre Dame	0
2	Penn State	3

Regional Final
1	Nebraska	1
2	Penn State	3

=== South regional ===
First round
Georgia Tech	3
George Mason	1
Georgia	3
Appalachian State	0
Louisville	0
Texas	3
Stephen F. Austin	2
Clemson	3

Second round
1	UCLA	3
Georgia Tech	0
Georgia	0
4	Duke	3
3	Florida	3
Texas	0
Clemson	0
2	Houston	3

Regional semifinal
1	UCLA	3
4	Duke	0
3	Florida	0
2	Houston	3

Regional Final
1	UCLA	3
2	Houston	0

== Final Four - Frank Erwin Center, Austin, Texas ==
National semifinals
1	Stanford	3
1	Ohio State	0
2	Penn State	2
1	UCLA	3

National Championship
1	Stanford	3
1	UCLA	1
