= Jen Flynn Oldenburg =

American volleyball player

Biographical details
- Born: July 26, 1978 (age 48); Pittsburgh, Pennsylvania
- Education: Ohio State University

Playing career
- 1996–1999: Ohio State
- 2001–2002: (United States) U.S. National Team
- Positions: Setter, Outside Hitter

Coaching career (HC unless noted)
- 2003–2012: Illinois (assistant)
- 2020–2026: Ohio State

Head coaching record
- Tournaments: 7–3 (.700) (NCAA Division I)

Accomplishments and honors

Awards
- Big Ten Coach of the Year (2020)
Medal record
Women's volleyball
Representing the United States
FIVB World championship
Silver medal – second place	2002 Germany	Team

Jen E. Flynn Oldenburg (born July 26, 1978) is an American former volleyball player and was the head coach of the Ohio State women's volleyball team from 2020–2026. She also serves as the President of the American Volleyball Coaches Association since May 20, 2025, a position she will hold through December 31, 2026.

== Career ==
Before getting into coaching, Flynn Oldenburg was a four-year starter on the Ohio State University women's volleyball team. Additionally, she was a member of the United States women's national volleyball team. She played at the 2002 FIVB World championship, where team USA won a silver medal.

=== University of Illinois: 2003-2012 ===
She coached as an assistant for the University of Illinois from 2003 to 2012

=== Club ===
After Illinois, she spent six years as the club/associate director of the Pittsburgh Elite Volleyball Association. She was responsible for the day-to-day operations of the club, handled recruitment for potential collegiate athletes and worked as a private lessons instructor.

=== Ohio State University ===
In January 2020, Flynn Oldenburg was named the head coach of the Ohio State women's volleyball team.

In her first season as head coach, she was named Big Ten Coach of the Year after Ohio State finished 15–3 in league play and made the NCAA tournament's round of sixteen. In the same year, she coached Emily Londot, who was named the league's Freshman of the Year as well. She is the only head coach in Ohio State history to earn an appearance in the national tournament during their first year.

== Head coaching record ==
Record table
Season	Team	Overall	Conference	Standing	Postseason
Ohio State Buckeyes (Big Ten) (2020–2026)
2020	Ohio State	16–4	15–3	4th	NCAA regional semifinal
2021	Ohio State	27–6	15–5	T–3rd	NCAA regional semifinal
2022	Ohio State	22–10	15–5	T–3rd	NCAA regional final
2023	Ohio State	10–18	7–13	T–9th	
2024	Ohio State	14–16	7–13	14th	
2025	Ohio State	6–20	3–17	T–16th	
2026	Ohio State	11–16	4–13	T–14th	
Ohio State:		105–90 (.538)	66–69 (.489)		
Total:		94–76 (.553)			
