= Ohio State Buckeyes women's volleyball =

American college volleyball team

- Founded: 1971; 55 years ago
- University: Ohio State University
- Athletic director: Ross Bjork
- Head coach: Vacant
- Conference: Big Ten
- Location: Columbus, Ohio, US
- Home arena: Covelli Center (capacity: 3,700)
- Nickname: Buckeyes
- Colors: Scarlet and gray

AIAW/NCAA tournament semifinal
- 1991, 1994

AIAW/NCAA Regional Final
- 1991, 1994, 2004, 2022

AIAW/NCAA regional semifinal
- 1989, 1991, 1993, 1994, 1995, 1996, 1997, 2001, 2002, 2004, 2006, 2010, 2011, 2014, 2015, 2016, 2020, 2021, 2022

AIAW/NCAA tournament appearance
- 1989, 1990, 1991, 1992, 1993, 1994, 1995, 1996, 1997, 1998, 2001, 2002, 2004, 2005, 2006, 2009, 2010, 2011, 2012, 2014, 2015, 2016, 2020, 2021, 2022

Conference regular season champion
- 1989, 1991, 1994

The Ohio State Buckeyes women's volleyball is one of the 19 women's varsity teams currently at The Ohio State University in Columbus, Ohio. The Buckeyes are part of the Big Ten Conference. The team had been coached by Jen Flynn Oldenburg since the 2020 season before being fired following the 2026 season. The program was founded and played their first year in 1971, first playing in St. John Arena, Ohio State plays their home games in the Covelli Center.

The team has won 3 regular season conference titles and has appeared in the NCAA Women's Volleyball Championship Tournament 23 times. They appeared in the Final Four twice in 1991 and 1994. Ohio State women's volleyball has been the home of many All-Americans and All Big Ten Honorees.

== Year-by-Year records ==
Season	Coach	Overall	Conference	Standing	Postseason
Mary Jo Campbell (Independent) (1971–1972)
1971	Mary Jo Campbell	4–4			
1972	Mary Jo Campbell	17–6			AIAW Qualifier
Mary Jo Campbell:		21–10			
Sue Collins (Independent) (1973–1979)
1973	Sue Collins	17–10			AIAW Qualifier
1974	Sue Collins	30–10			AIAW Qualifier
1975	Sue Collins	14–12			AIAW Qualifier
1976	Sue Collins	29–21			AIAW Placed
1977	Sue Collins	29–11			AIAW Qualifier
1978	Sue Collins	34–10			AIAW 10th Place
1979	Sue Collins	37–14			AIAW 6th Place
Sue Collins:		190–88			
Lisa Richards (Independent) (1980–1981)
1980	Lisa Richards	19–24			AIAW Qualifier
1981	Lisa Richards	37–21			AIAW 12th Place
Lisa Richards:		56–45			
Jim Stone (Big Ten Conference) (1982–2007)
1982	Jim Stone	14–14			
1983	Jim Stone	25–11	9–4	Semi	
1984	Jim Stone	18–13	9–4	Semi	
1985	Jim Stone	27–11	12–6	3rd	
1986	Jim Stone	20–11	11–7	4th	
1987	Jim Stone	19–17	7–11	8th	
1988	Jim Stone	14–16	8–10	7th	
1989	Jim Stone	27–7	16–2	1st	NCAA Sweet 16
1990	Jim Stone	23–8	15–3	2nd	NCAA First Round
1991	Jim Stone	30–4	20–0	1st	NCAA Final Four
1992	Jim Stone	21–9	14–6	3rd	NCAA First Round
1993	Jim Stone	24–6	17–3	2nd	NCAA Sweet 16
1994	Jim Stone	29–3	19–1	1st	NCAA Final Four
1995	Jim Stone	22–8	16–4	2nd	NCAA Sweet 16
1996	Jim Stone	27–6	15–5	3rd	NCAA Sweet 16
1997	Jim Stone	24–11	13–7	3rd	
1998	Jim Stone	17–14	9–11	5th	NCAA Second Round
1999	Jim Stone	1–26	1–19	5th	
2000	Jim Stone	0–30	0–20	4th	
2001	Jim Stone	27–4	17–3	2nd	NCAA Sweet 16
2002	Jim Stone	21–11	13–7	4th	NCAA Sweet 16
2003	Jim Stone	11–17	5–15	t-9th	
2004	Jim Stone	30–4	17–3	t-2nd	NCAA Elite 8
2005	Jim Stone	22–9	14–6	t-3rd	NCAA Second Round
2006	Jim Stone	25–8	13–7	4th	NCAA Sweet 16
2007	Jim Stone	13–16	7–13	9th	
Jim Stone:		531–294	297–177		
Geoff Carlston (Big Ten Conference) (2008–2019)
2008	Geoff Carlston	12–20	3–17	10th	
2009	Geoff Carlston	25–10	12–8	T-4th	NCAA Second Round
2010	Geoff Carlston	24–12	10–10	6th	NCAA Sweet 16
2011	Geoff Carlston	21–15	9–11	7th	NCAA Sweet 16
2012	Geoff Carlston	23–11	13–7	4th	NCAA Second Round
2013	Geoff Carlston	18–14	6–14	10th	
2014	Geoff Carlston	23–12	12–8	T-5th	NCAA Sweet 16
2015	Geoff Carlston	25–10	12–8	6th	NCAA Sweet 16
2016	Geoff Carlston	22–13	10–10	T-7th	NCAA Sweet 16
2017	Geoff Carlston	15–16	8–12	9th	
2018	Geoff Carlston	12–20	3–17	13th	
2019	Geoff Carlston	15–17	8–12	8th	
Geoff Carlston:		235–170	106–134		
Jen Flynn Oldenburg (Big Ten Conference) (2020–present)
2020	Jen Flynn Oldenburg	16–4	15–3	4th	NCAA Sweet 16
2021	Jen Flynn Oldenburg	27–6	15–5	3rd	NCAA Sweet 16
2022	Jen Flynn Oldenburg	22–10	15–5	T–3rd	NCAA Elite 8
2023	Jen Flynn Oldenburg	10–18	7–13	T–9th	
2024	Jen Flynn Oldenburg	14–16	7–13	14th	
2025	Jen Flynn Oldenburg	6–20	3–17	T–16th	
2026	Jen Flynn Oldenburg	11–16	4–13	T–14th	
Jenn Flynn Oldenburg:		107–92 (.538)	67–68 (.496)		
Total:		1,140–699 (.620)			
National champion Postseason invitational champion Conference regular season champion Conference regular season and conference tournament champion Division regular season champion Division regular season and conference tournament champion Conference tournament champion

== Venues ==
=== St. John Arena ===
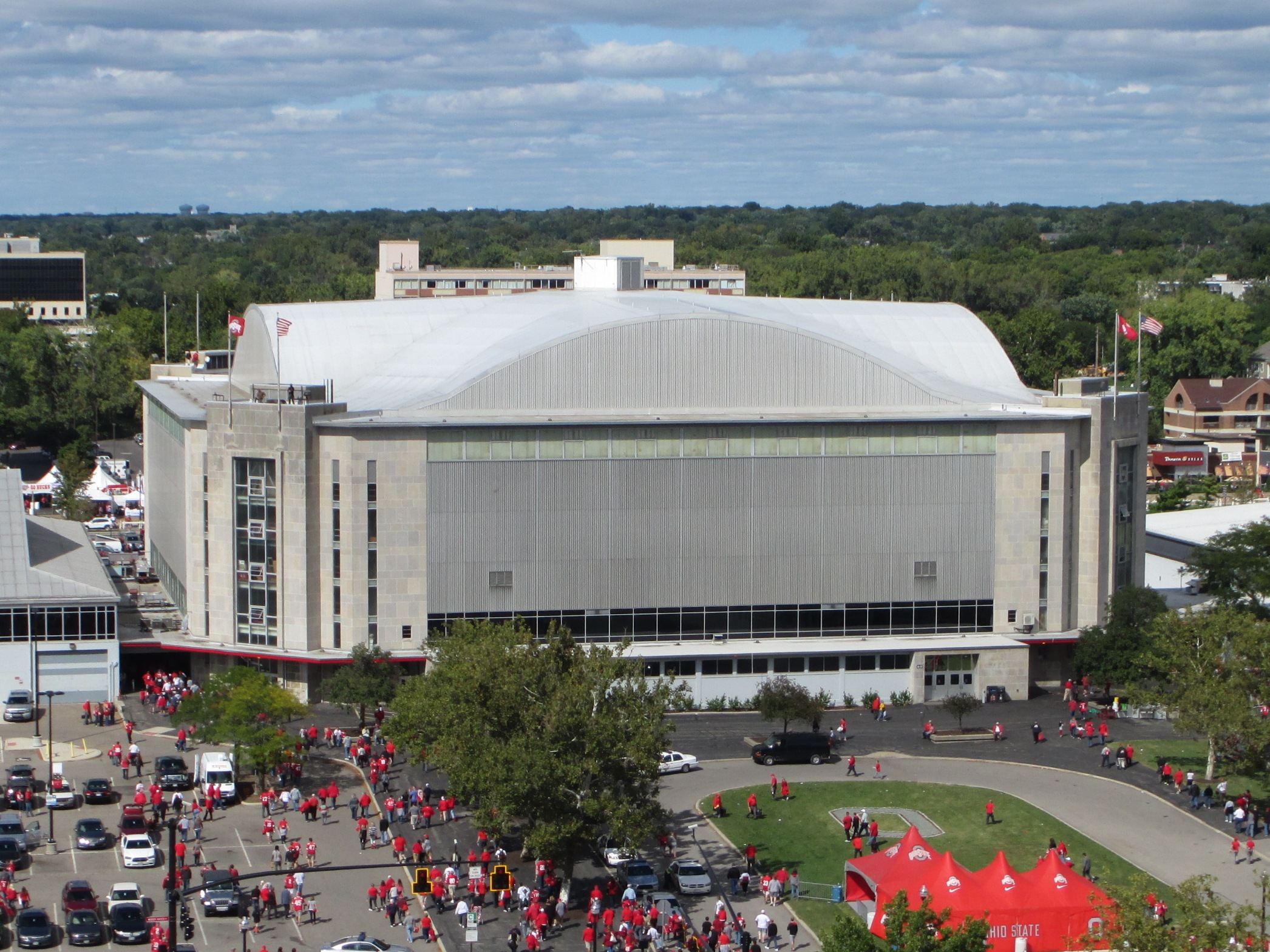
St. John Arena

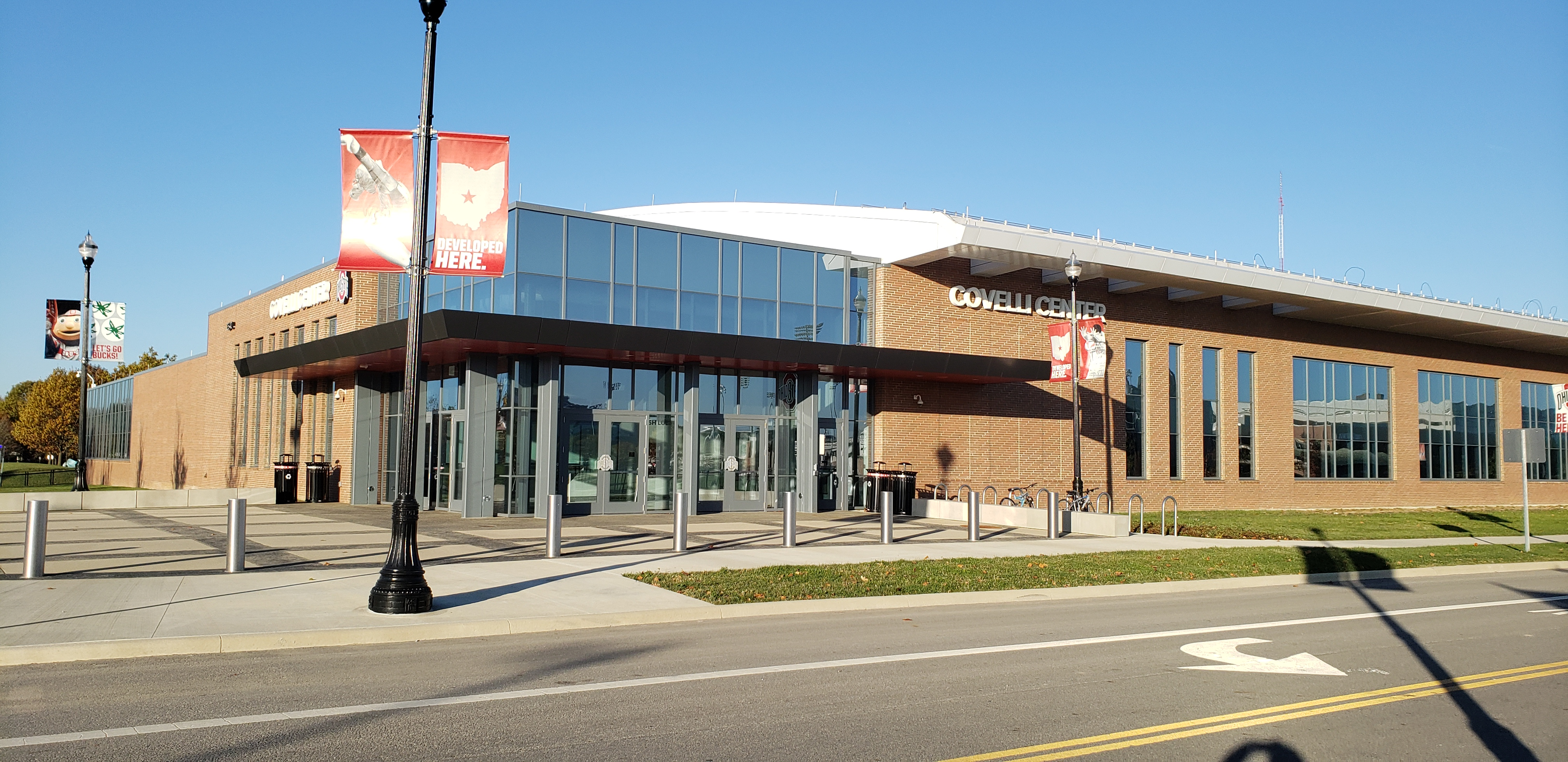
Covelli Center

The former home of the Ohio State women's volleyball team. The buckeyes were located in St. John Arena from 1989 until 2018 before the teams departure for the Covelli Center. While in the arena the Buckeyes has a record of 333–115.

The Buckeyes played their only two undefeated home seasons in St. John Arena in 1989 and 1991 The team had their final match in St. John as they took a loss to the then number three Minnesota Golden Gophers in a five-set thriller.

=== Covelli Center ===
The Buckeyes play their home matches at the Covelli Center on campus. They began playing at the arena in 2019, after having spent more than 45 seasons at St. John Arena. Their first match at the Covelli Center was played on August 30, 2019, against Lehigh University, which they won, 3–0 (25–16, 25–20, 25–14).

The Buckeyes hosted the NCAA Division I women's volleyball tournament at Nationwide Arena in 2016 and again in 2021.

== Coaches ==
=== Coaching history ===
No.	Coach	Seasons	Record	Big Ten titles	NCAA/AIAW Apps
1	Mary Jo Campbell	1971–1972	21–10 (.677)	n/a	1
2	Sue Collins	1973–1979	190–88 (.683)	n/a	2
3	Lisa Richards	1980–1981	56–45 (.554)	n/a	7
4	Jim Stone	1982–2007	531–153 (.644)	3	14
5	Geoff Carlston	2008–2019	220–153 (.590)	0	7
6	Jen Flynn Oldenburg	2020–2026	107–92 (.538)	0	3

=== Coaching staff ===
Coach	Position	First year	Alma mater
Vacant	Head coach		
Brian Wright	Assistant coach	2020	Texas State
Michelle Bartsch-Hackley	Assistant Coach	2023	Illinois
Caitlin Insana	Director of Operations	2016	Ohio State

== Awards ==
=== Coaching awards ===
The coaching staff at Ohio State have racked up 5 Big Ten Coach of the Year and 4 AVCA regional coach of the year awards.

==== AVCA Region Coach of the Year ====
- Jim Stone (North Central) - 1988
- Jim Stone (Mideast) - 1989, 1999, 2004

==== Big Ten Coach of the Year ====
- Jim Stone - 1989, 1991, 1994, 2004
- Jen Flynn Oldenburg - 2020

=== Player Awards ===
Ohio State has enjoyed a rich volleyball player history. An Ohio State player has been named National Player of the Year twice (one co), National Freshman of the Year twice, Big Ten Player of the Year six times, and Big Ten Freshman of the Year seven times.

==== AVCA National Player of the Year ====
- Laura Davis - 1994
- Stacey Gordon (Co) - 2004

==== Big Ten Player of the Year ====
- Holly O'Leary - 1989
- Leisa Wissler - 1991
- Laura Davis - 1994
- Vanessa Wouters - 1996
- Stacey Gordon - 2002, 2004

Big Ten Defensive Player of the Year

- Kylie Murr - 2022

Big Ten Setter of the Year

- Mac Podraza - 2022

==== AVCA National Freshman of the Year ====
- Stacey Gordon - 2001
- Emily Londot - 2020

==== Big Ten Freshman of the Year ====
- Leisa Wissler - 1988
- Laura Davis - 1991
- Jenny Jackson -1992
- Dana Stearns - 1997
- Katie Virtue - 1999
- Stacey Gordon - 2001
- Emily Londot - 2020

=== All-Americans ===
Ohio State has had 21 players account for 28 overall and 7 first-team AVCA All-American selections.

First Team: Laura Davis - 1993, 1994; Gabriele Jobst - 1994; Vanessa Wouters - 1996; Stacey Gordon - 2002, 2004; Taylor Sandbothe - 2015	Second Team: Holly O'Leary - 1989; Audrey DiPronio - 1990; Julie Chellevold - 1991; Leisa Wissler - 1991; Gabriele Jobst - 1993; Tricia Stragliotto - 1995; Stacey Gordon - 2001, 2003; Marisa Main - 2004, 2005, 2006; Taylor Sandbothe - 2016; Emily Londot - 2020, 2022; Rylee Rader - 2021; Mac Podraza - 2022	Third Team: Danielle Meyer - 2005, 2006; Mari Hole - 2012; Elizabeth Campbell - 2015; Mac Podraza - 2021
