= Steve Aird =

Canadian volleyball coach (born 1978)

Steve A. Aird
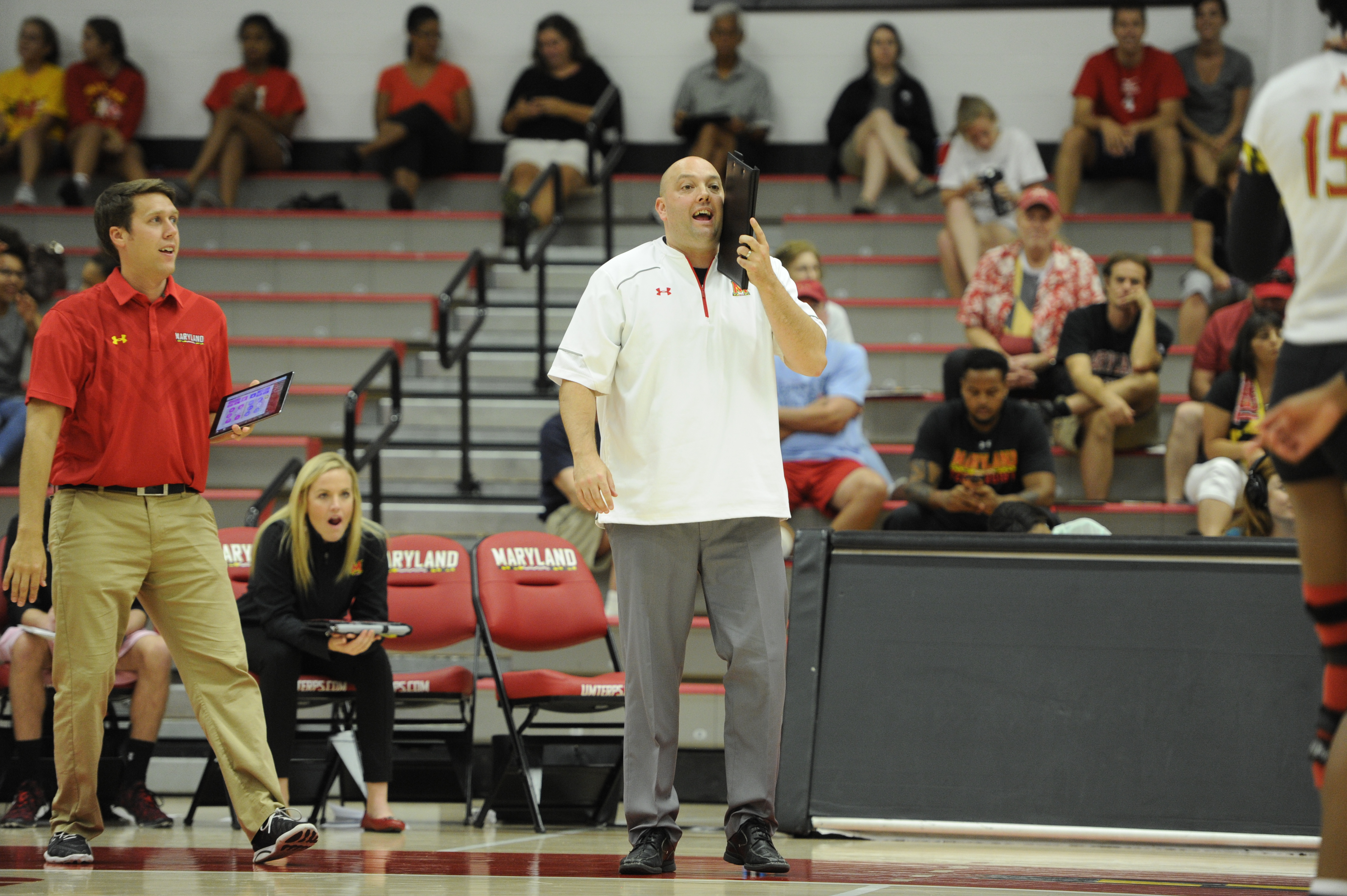
- Aird vs. Kent St. in 2015

Current position
- Title: Head coach
- Team: Indiana
- Conference: Big Ten
- Record: 139–133 (.511)

Biographical details
- Born: January 26, 1978 (age 48); Toronto, Ontario. Canada
- Education: Pennsylvania State University

Playing career
- 1997–2001: Penn State University
- Position: Outside Hitter

Coaching career (HC unless noted)
- 2002–2005: Auburn (Assistant)
- 2005–2007: Cincinnati (Assistant)
- 2007–2010: Penn State (Director of Volleyball Operations)
- 2012–2014: Penn State (Assistant)
- 2014–2017: Maryland
- 2018–present: Indiana

Steve A. Aird (born January 26, 1978) is a Canadian volleyball coach at Indiana University (2018–present). He was previously the head volleyball coach at the University of Maryland from 2014-2017.

== Personal life ==
Aird was born in Toronto, Ontario, Canada, and received his degree in Letters, Arts and Sciences with a focus on business law and sports management in 2001. He is married to Brandy Wilson Aird. Steve and Brandy have three kids, Caelan, Padraic and Mackenzie.

== Playing career ==
Aird played at Penn State University from 1997 to 2001, where he started from 1999 to 2001. The Nittany Lions made three NCAA semifinal appearances during his career. He graduated from Penn State in 2001 with a bachelor's degree in Letters, Arts and Sciences with a focus on business law and sports management.

== Coaching career ==
Aird brings more than 15 years of coaching and playing experience at the highest level of collegiate volleyball, serving as an assistant coach at three Division I programs in addition to being a two-time captain during his playing days at Penn State. In the past two seasons, Penn State players earned nine AVCA All-America accolades and 14 All-Big Ten Conference honors.

Prior to joining the Penn State staff in 2012, Aird served as President and CMO of Complete Athlete Inc., which included such duties as marketing, corporate expansion, coach and player development, scouting and match preparation. He coached players who went on to play at several of the nation’s top Division I programs, including Stanford, Washington, Florida, Tennessee and Penn State.

Aird previously served as an assistant coach and director of operations for Penn State in 2007, recruiting and training student-athletes who went on to win National Championships in 2007, 2008, 2009 and 2010.

Aird began his coaching career in 2002, when he served as an assistant at Auburn from 2002–05, before coaching as an assistant at Cincinnati from 2005-07. He played a critical role in bringing in one of Cincinnati’s recruiting classes, and developed numerous all-conference and all-America student-athletes.

Aird’s volleyball background spans far beyond the coaching realm. He is a noted clinician, having spoken at hundreds of camps and clinics across the country, in addition to going on several international tours to train and recruit. Aird has also been a featured writer for Volleyball Magazine and the American Volleyball Coaches Association Magazine.

In Aird's second season with Indiana, the team set a program record in average attendance (1,809).

=== Head coaching record ===
Record table
Season	Team	Overall	Conference	Standing	Postseason
Maryland Terrapins (Big Ten Conference) (2014–2017)
2014	Maryland	10–21	3–17	13th	
2015	Maryland	15–19	5–15	12th	
2016	Maryland	12–20	4–16	12th	
2017	Maryland	18–14	7–13	10th	
Maryland:		55–74 (.426)	19–61 (.238)		
Indiana Hoosiers (Big Ten Conference) (2018–present)
2018	Indiana	16–15	7–13	9th	
2019	Indiana	14–19	3–17	13th	
2020	Indiana	5–15	5–15	11th	
2021	Indiana	10–22	4–16	T–11th	
2022	Indiana	16–16	9-11	8th	
2023	Indiana	21–12	11–9	T–6th	
2024	Indiana	15–15	8–12	T–10th	
2025	Indiana	25–8	14–6	5th	NCAA Regional Semifinal
2026	Indiana	17–11	9–8	T–8th	TBD
Indiana:		139–133 (.511)	72–106 (.404)		
Total:		194–207 (.484)			
