= Sarah Franklin (volleyball) =

American volleyball player (born 2002)

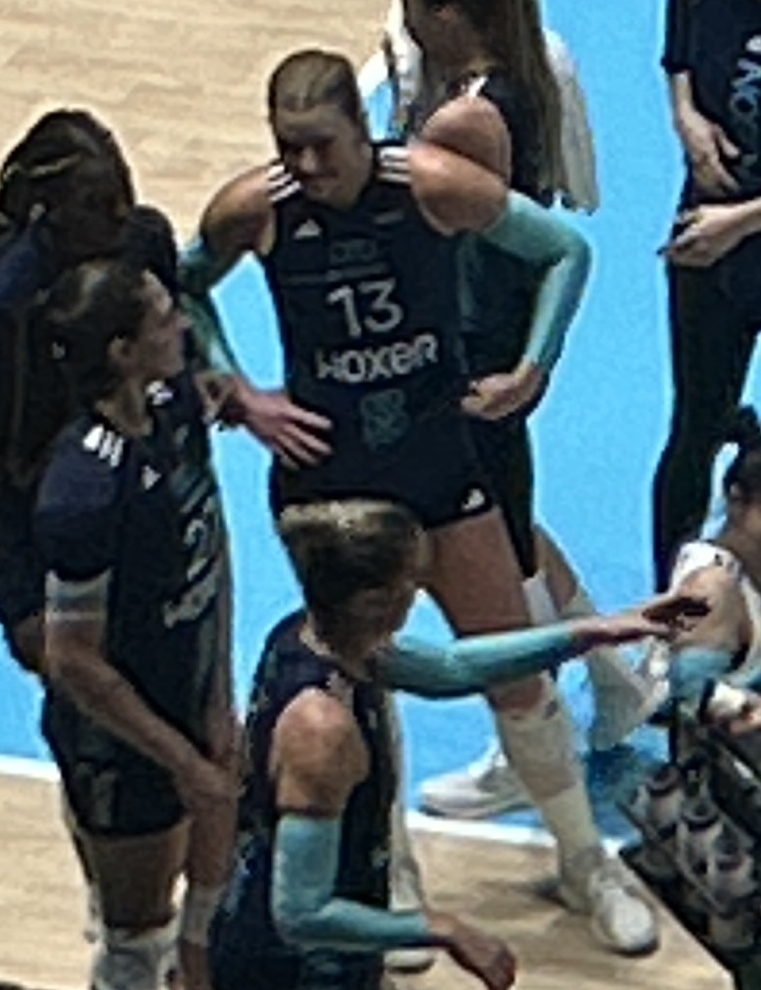
- Franklin playing for LOVB Madison in January 2025

Personal information
- Born: February 27, 2002 (age 24)
- Hometown: Lake Worth Beach, Florida, U.S.
- Height: 6 ft 4 in (193 cm)
- Education: Michigan State (2020–2021); Wisconsin (2022–2024)

Volleyball information
- Position: Outside hitter
- Current club: (Turkey) Zeren SK
- Number: 13

Career
Years	Teams
2025	(United States) LOVB Madison
2025–2026	(Italy) Savino del Bene Scandicci
2026–	(Turkey) Zeren S.K

Sarah Franklin (born February 27, 2002) is an American professional volleyball player who currently plays for Savino del Bene Scandicci. An outside hitter, she played college volleyball for the Michigan State Spartans and the Wisconsin Badgers. She was named the AVCA National Player of the Year in 2023 and Big Ten Player of the Year in 2023 and 2024.

== Early life ==
Franklin was raised in Lake Worth Beach, Florida, the daughter of engineers Todd and Michelle Franklin, and has three siblings. She played soccer as a goalkeeper before taking up volleyball at age 11, which her mother played collegiately at Virginia. She played high school volleyball for Lake Worth Christian School beginning in eighth grade, winning state championships in 2015 and 2019, and was named the Sun Sentinel player of the year in 2019. She played club volleyball for Palm Beach Juniors.

== College career ==
Franklin spent two seasons with the Michigan State Spartans. In her sophomore year in 2021, she led the team with 3.96 kills per set on a .224 hitting percentage, receiving first-team All-Big Ten Conference honors. Following that season, she transferred to the reigning NCAA champion Wisconsin Badgers. Franklin led the Badgers with 3.51 kills per set on .246 hitting in the 2022 season, helping the team earn a number-one seed in the 2022 NCAA tournament, where they fell to Pittsburgh in the regional finals. Later that school year in June 2023, Franklin underwent seven-hour surgery for blood clots caused by quadrilateral space syndrome, recovering before the fall season.

Franklin recorded 4.15 kills per set on a career-high .298 hitting in the 2023 season. She led the Badgers to a number-one seed and the Final Four of the 2023 NCAA tournament, where they lost to eventual champions Texas. Franklin received multiple honors, including Big Ten Player of the Year, AVCA first-team All-American, and AVCA National Player of the Year. She was nominated for the Best Female College Athlete ESPY Award. She had a fifth season of eligibility due to the COVID-19 pandemic. In her fifth season, Franklin hit a career-high 4.46 kills per set on .289 hitting as Wisconsin reached the NCAA tournament regional finals. She repeated as the Big Ten Player of the Year and first-team All-American.

== Professional career ==
Franklin joined LOVB Madison ahead of LOVB Pro's inaugural 2025 season. She is currently signed with the Italian Serie A1 team Savino del Bene Scandicci for the 2025–2026 season.. Together, Franklin and Scandicci won the Club World Championships, marking their first title after deafeating the reigning champions, Imocco Congeliano 3-1

In June 2026, Ankara based Zeren S.K announced Franklin has signed for the 2026/2027 season

== International career ==
Franklin debuted with the senior U.S. national team at the 2025 Volleyball Nations League, where she was the team's leading scorer with a total of 143 points. She was then named to the 14-player roster for the FIVB Women's World Championship later that summer, placing fifth with Team USA.

== Awards ==
=== Clubs ===
- 2025 FIVB Club World Championship – Gold medal, with Savino del Bene Scandicci
