= Indiana Hoosiers women's volleyball =

American college volleyball team

- Founded: 1975
- University: Indiana University Bloomington
- Head coach: Steve Aird (9th season)
- Conference: Big Ten
- Location: Bloomington, Indiana, US
- Home arena: Wilkinson Hall (capacity: 3,000)
- Nickname: Hoosiers
- Colors: Crimson and cream

AIAW/NCAA tournament appearance
- 1995, 1998, 1999, 2002, 2010, 2025

The Indiana Hoosiers women's volleyball is the team that is currently coached by Steve Aird, who began in during the 2018 season.

== Historical statistics ==
Overall
Years of Volleyball	42
1st Season	1983
Head Coaches	6
All-Time Record	644–133–3
ACC games
ACC W-L record (Prior to 2015)	56–19
ACC Titles	5
ACC Tournament Titles	0
Big Ten games
Big Ten W-L record (Since 2015)	6–28
Big Ten Titles	0
NCAA Tournament
NCAA Appearances	5
NCAA W-L record	2–4
Final Fours	0
National Championships	0

*Statistics through 2015 season

== See also ==
- List of NCAA Division I women's volleyball programs
- Big Ten Conference volleyball
