= Adam Hughes (volleyball) =

American volleyball coach

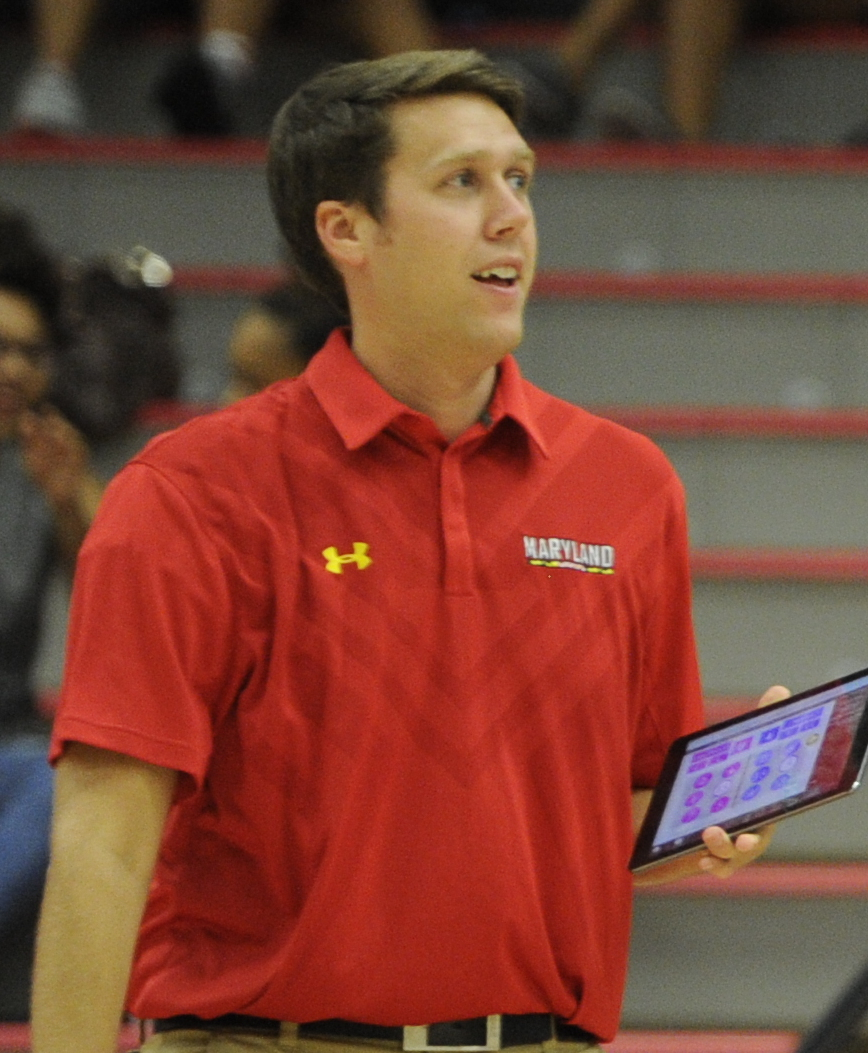
- Hughes in 2015

Current position
- Title: Head coach
- Team: Maryland
- Conference: Big Ten
- Record: (124–146 (.459))

Biographical details
- Born: May 8, 1986 (age 40); State College, Pennsylvania

Coaching career (HC unless noted)
- 2006–2008: Penn State (Volunteer Assistant)
- 2009: UC Irvine (Volunteer Assistant)
- 2010–2013: Penn State (DOVO)
- 2014–2017: Maryland (Assistant)
- 2018–present: Maryland

Accomplishments and honors

Awards
- AVCA "Thirty Under 30" (2015)

Adam Hughes (born May 8, 1986) is an American volleyball coach. He is currently the head coach for the Maryland Terrapins women's volleyball team.

== Personal life ==
Hughes was born in State College, Pennsylvania, and received his degree in economics in 2006 from Penn State. He is married to Alice Kahrs Hughes. Adam and Alice have three daughters, Harper, Hayden, and Henley.

== Coaching career ==
Hughes played volleyball in high school and aimed to join the Penn State men's volleyball team as a walk-on. However, the women's team head coach Russ Rose convinced him to be a practice player with the women's team. He attributed being a practice player to his love for the sport and starting his coaching career. Hughes served as a volunteer assistant and manager for Penn State women's volleyball from 2003 to 2008. Following this, Hughes was named the volunteer assistant coach for the women's volleyball team at UC Irvine in 2008–09.

He returned to Penn State in 2010 as the Director of Volleyball Operations. During this time period, he won two NCAA national championships, in 2013 and 2014. During his nine seasons at Penn State, Hughes helped the Nittany Lions capture three NCAA national championships and eight Big Ten Conference championships.

Hughes joined Maryland in 2014 as an assistant coach and on January 23, 2018, Hughes was named as the head coach.

== Head coaching record ==
Record table
| Season | Team | Overall | Conference | Standing | Postseason |
|---|---|---|---|---|---|
Maryland Terrapins (Big Ten Conference) (2018–present)
| 2018 | Maryland | 18–14 | 9–11 | 7th | |
| 2019 | Maryland | 13–19 | 5–15 | T–8th | |
| 2020 | Maryland | 5–15 | 5–15 | 12th | |
| 2021 | Maryland | 19–13 | 7–13 | T–9th | |
| 2022 | Maryland | 16–16 | 7–13 | T–11th | |
| 2023 | Maryland | 17–15 | 7–13 | 11th | |
| 2024 | Maryland | 14–17 | 5–15 | 15th | |
| 2025 | Maryland | 8–22 | 1–19 | 18th | |
| 2026 | Maryland | 14–15 | 4–13 | T–14th | |
| Maryland: | | 124–146 (.459) | 50–129 (.279) | | |
| Total: | | 124–146 (.459) | | | |
