= Chris Tamas =

American volleyball player

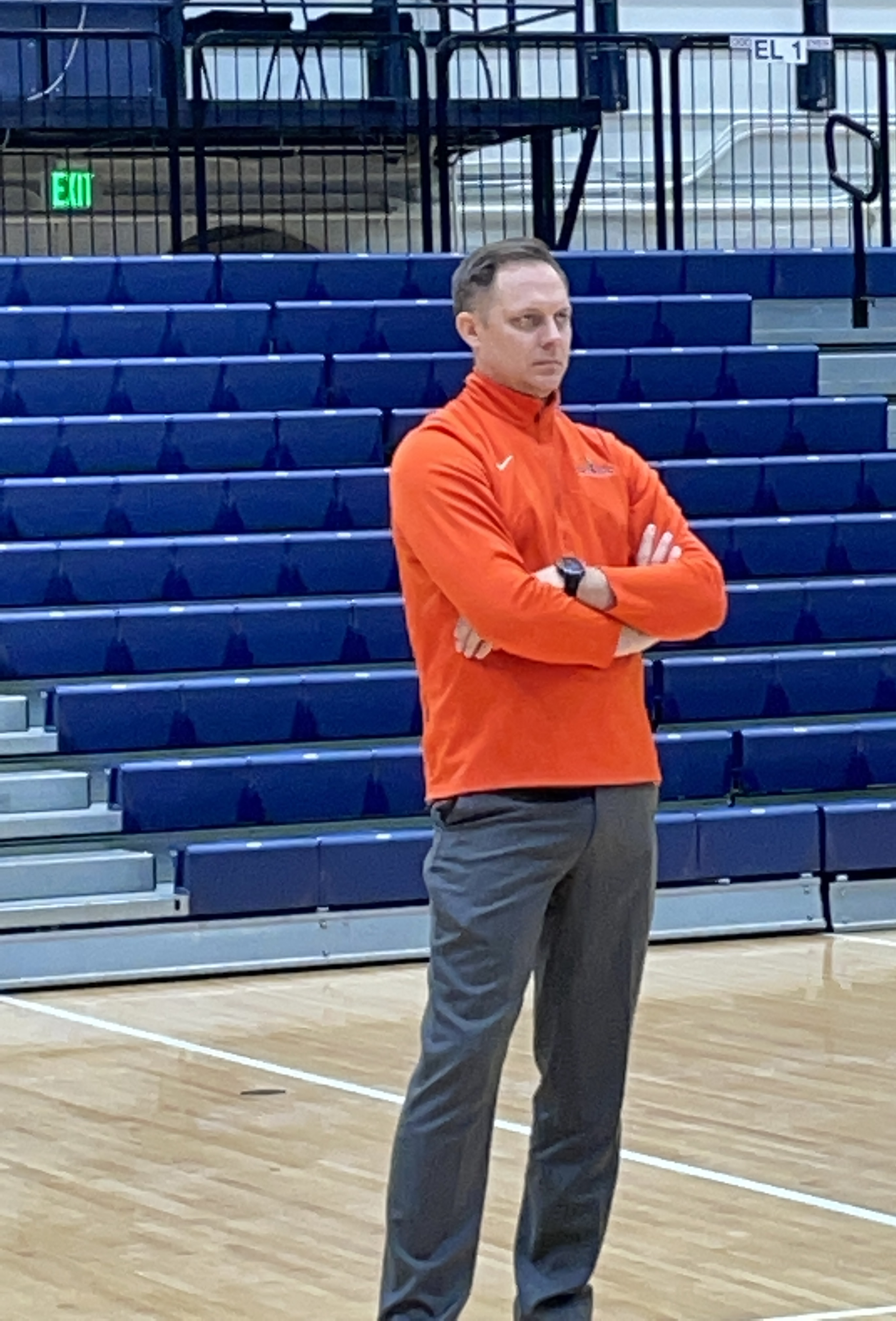
- Chris Tamas at an Illinois volleyball practice in October 2022

Current position
- Title: Head coach
- Team: Illinois
- Conference: Big Ten
- Record: 181–119
- Annual salary: $368,000

Biographical details
- Born: January 27, 1981 (age 45); Santa Barbara, California, U.S.
- Education: University of the Pacific

Coaching career (HC unless noted)
- 2009–2011: UC Riverside (assistant)
- 2011–2012: Minnesota (assistant)
- 2013–2015: Cal Poly (assistant)
- 2015–2017: Nebraska (assistant)
- 2017–present: Illinois

Head coaching record
- Overall: 181–119

Accomplishments and honors

Awards
- AVCA Northeast Region Coach of the Year (2018)

Christopher Tamas (born January 27, 1981) is an American volleyball coach. He is the head coach of the Illinois Fighting Illini women's volleyball team, a position he had held since 2017. He led the Fighting Illini to the semifinals of the 2018 NCAA Division I women's volleyball tournament.

== Early life ==
Tamas graduated from the University of the Pacific in Stockton, California, earning his bachelor's degree in sports sciences/management in 2003.

== Coaching career ==
=== UC Riverside ===
Tamas served as an assistant coach at UC Riverside from 2009 to 2011.

=== Minnesota ===
Tamas served as an assistant coach at Minnesota from 2011 to 2012.

=== Cal Poly ===
From 2013 to 2015, Tamas served as an assistant volleyball coach at Cal Poly.

=== Nebraska ===
On May 28, 2015, Tamas was hired by Nebraska to be an assistant volleyball coach under Hall of Fame head coach John Cook.

=== Illinois ===
Tamas was hired as head women's volleyball coach at the University of Illinois Urbana-Champaign on February 10, 2017, as the eighth head coach in program history. Tamas led Illinois to the 2018 NCAA Division I women's volleyball tournament semifinals. In the 2021 NCAA tournament, Tamas led his team, which ranked seventh in the Big Ten Conference, to an upset of national no. 7 seed and defending NCAA national champions, Kentucky, in the second round.

== Head coaching record ==
Record table
Season	Team	Overall	Conference	Standing	Postseason
Illinois Fighting Illini (Big Ten Conference) (2017–present)
2017	Illinois	23–11	12–8	T–5th	NCAA Division I Regional semifinal
2018	Illinois	32–4	17–3	2nd	NCAA Division I National semifinal
2019	Illinois	16–14	11–9	7th	NCAA Division I first round
2020	Illinois	7–11	7–11	7th	
2021	Illinois	22–12	12–8	7th	NCAA Division I Regional semifinal
2022	Illinois	15–15	10–10	7th	
2023	Illinois	16–14	11–9	T–6th	
2024	Illinois	18–12	10–10	8th	NCAA Division I first round
2025	Illinois	13–16	8–12	T–10th	
2026	Illinois	19–10	10–7	7th	
Illinois:		181–119 (.603)	108–87 (.554)		
Total:		181–119 (.603)			
