= Mary Eggers Tendler =

Volleyball coach, former volleyball player

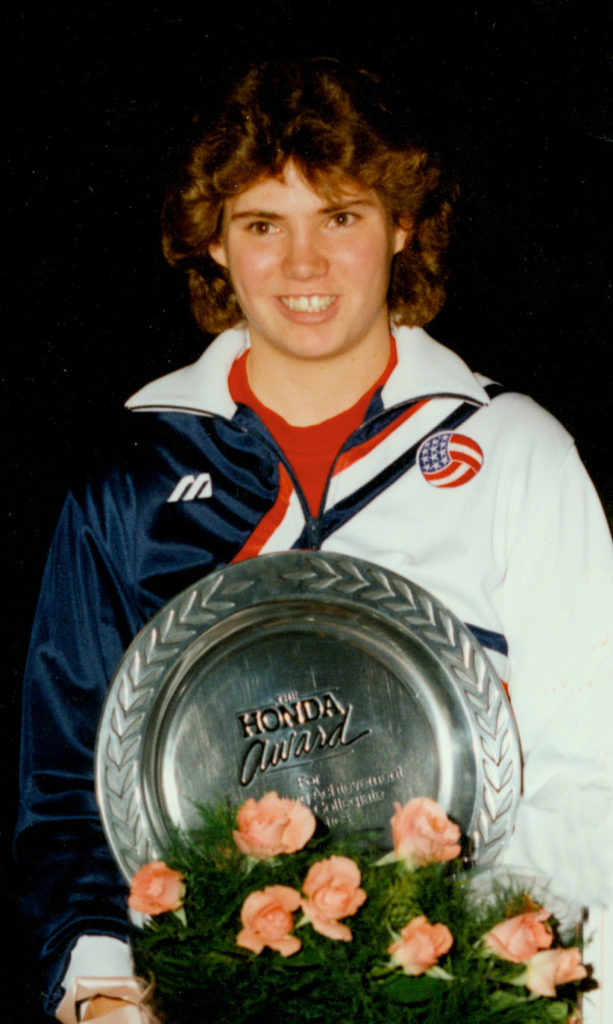

Personal information
- Nationality: United States
- Height: 5–11
- Education: Illinois 1985–88

Volleyball information
- Position: Middle hitter

Mary Eggers Tendler (née Eggers) is a volleyball coach and former volleyball player. She is the head volleyball coach at Elon University and played collegiately for Illinois where she was a First-Team All-American and winner of the Broderick Award (now the Honda Sports Award) in 1989 as the nation's top collegiate female volleyball player.

== Early life ==
Eggers was born to Warren and Shirley Eggers and grew up in Aurora, Illinois with four older brothers and sisters. She shot basketballs in her driveway in the evening, and when her older sisters would return home with a date, she would challenge the dates to a hoop contest. Even though she was ten years old, she would challenge them in her pyjamas and usually beat them, picking up a little pocket change. She started playing volleyball in eighth grade, when her pastor persuaded her to join a team. She attended West Aurora High School, where she played both basketball and volleyball, but she improved her volleyball skills and was named a high school All-American. In her senior year, she helped lead the team to the state supersectionals.

While at high school, she played basketball and volleyball for her first three years, but then decided to concentrate on volleyball, and only played volleyball as a senior. In her senior year, she was named the Chicago Sun-Times Girls Volleyball Players of the Year. She considered several schools in the area, including Northwestern, Illinois State, Western Michigan and Illinois. However, while all three schools other than Illinois were ranked in the top 20 in the nation, she decided to go to Illinois. It wasn't because of their strength as a program, the team was 15–18 the year before she arrived, and 5–25 the year before, but she felt Illinois was a "team on the rise" and she wanted to be part of it.

== College ==
Eggers led the nation in hitting percentage in her sophomore and senior years, 1986, and 1988. She was named to the First-Team All-Big Ten team all four years of school, and was named an All-American three times. Her career hitting percentage, .420, was tops in the nation and stood as the top mark until 1993. She helped lead the team to their first ever NCAA Division I women's volleyball tournament in 1985, and helped the team reach the final four in 1987 and 1988. In 1989, her senior year, she won the Honda Broderick Award as the nation's top collegiate female volleyball player.

== Professional ==
Eggers played a year and a half with the Olympic team, then played professionally for two years in Germany and France.

== Coaching ==
She began her coaching career as an assistant coach at Illinois State, Drake and James Madison. She became the head coach at Elon University in 2002. In 2010, she was named the SoCon Coach of the Year as the best coach in the Southern Conference.
