= Caitlin Schweihofer =

American volleyball coach

Current position
- Title: Head coach
- Team: Rutgers
- Conference: Big Ten
- Record: 63–141 (.309)

Biographical details
- Born: July 5, 1986 (age 40); Trooper, Pennsylvania, U.S.
- Education: St. John's (NY) (B.A.); Lehigh (M.Ed)

Playing career
- 2004–2006: St. John's (NY)

Coaching career (HC unless noted)
- 2012: Bucknell (assistant)
- 2013: Lehigh (assistant)
- 2014–2018: La Salle
- 2019: Northeastern
- 2020–present: Rutgers

Head coaching record
- Overall: 136–249 (.353)

Accomplishments and honors

Awards
- Atlantic 10 Coach of the Year (2019)

Caitlin M. Schweihofer (née Rimgaila; born July 5, 1986) is an American former volleyball player who is the head coach of the Rutgers Scarlet Knights women's volleyball team. She previously served as head coach at La Salle and Northeastern.

== Personal life ==
In 2025, she revealed that she was diagnosed with multiple sclerosis in 2022.

== Career ==
=== Playing career ===
Schweihofer played as a middle blocker for St. John's (NY) from 2004 to 2006. She captained the Red Storm to an undefeated conference run in 2006. The same year, the team achieved a top 25 national ranking for the first time in program history. She was named Big East Conference Scholar Athlete of the Year in 2006.

After graduating from St. John's in spring 2007, she transferred to Dayton with one year of eligibility remaining; however, she opted to leave the team to focus on academics before the season began.

=== Coaching career ===
Schweihofer was named head coach of the La Salle Explorers volleyball team in 2014 and coached there for five seasons. She was named the 2018 Atlantic 10 Conference Coach of the Year.

She coached for one season for the Northeastern Huskies team, before being named the head coach of Rutgers Scarlet Knights women's volleyball team in 2020.

== Head coaching record ==
Record table
Season	Team	Overall	Conference	Standing	Postseason
La Salle (Atlantic 10 Conference) (2014–2018)
2014	La Salle	10–21	3–11	T–7th	
2015	La Salle	6–25	0–14	10th	
2016	La Salle	10–20	1–13	10th	
2017	La Salle	14–16	4–10	T–7th	
2018	La Salle	18–12	9–5	3rd	
La Salle:		58–94 (.382)	17–53 (.243)		
Northeastern Huskies (Colonial Athletic Association) (2019)
2019	Northeastern	15–14	9–7	4th	
Northeastern:		15–14 (.517)	9–7 (.563)		
Rutgers (Big Ten Conference) (2020–present)
2020	Rutgers	6–14	6–14	10th	
2021	Rutgers	8–21	0–20	14th	
2022	Rutgers	8–24	2–18	14th	
2023	Rutgers	10–20	2–18	13th	
2024	Rutgers	6–25	1–19	18th	
2025	Rutgers	12–20	3–17	17th	
2026	Rutgers	13–17	4–13	T–14th	
Rutgers:		63–141 (.309)	18–119 (.131)		
Total:		136–249 (.353)			
