= Big Ten Conference women's volleyball =

Collegiate volleyball event

Big Ten Conference
- Conference: NCAA
- Division: Division I
- No. of teams: 18

Big Ten Conference women's volleyball is made up of the women's volleyball programs from the Big Ten Conference's 18 member universities. Through 2024, the Big Ten has earned a combined 40 NCAA national semifinal appearances by eight different teams. In 1987, Illinois became the first Big Ten program to make an appearance in the national semifinal. In 1999 Penn State won the conference's first national championship, and they have won eight overall, including a record four consecutive titles from 2007 to 2010. The Big Ten conference claims eleven women's volleyball national championships overall with Penn State having won eight, Nebraska having won two, and Wisconsin having won one. Penn State (eleven times), Nebraska (four times), Wisconsin (four times), Minnesota (one time), and Illinois (one time) have each made national championship game appearances as members of the Big Ten.

In 2011, former Big 12 member Nebraska joined the Big Ten. The Cornhuskers have won five national championships, with two of these coming since the school joined the Big Ten. Rutgers University and the University of Maryland joined the Big Ten in July 2014, and on August 2, 2024, the Big Ten Conference announced the formal admission of the University of Oregon, the University of Washington, UCLA, and USC from the recently dissolved Pac-12 Conference.

== Teams ==
School	Head coach	Big Ten titles†	National semifinal appearances	Best NCAA finish
Penn State	Katie Schumacher-Cawley	18 (1992, 1993, 1996–99, 2003–10, 2012, 2013, 2017, 2024)	14 (1993, 1994, 1997–99, 2007–10, 2012–14, 2017, 2024)	Champions (1999, 2007–10, 2013, 2014, 2024)
Nebraska	Dani Busboom Kelly	7 (2011, 2016, 2017, 2023–2026)	18 (1986*, 1989*, 1990*, 1995*, 1996*, 1998*, 2000*, 2001*, 2005*, 2006*, 2008*, 2015–18, 2021, 2023-24)	Champions (1995*, 2000*, 2006*, 2015, 2017)
Wisconsin	Kelly Sheffield	9 (1990, 1997, 2000, 2001, 2014, 2019–22)	6 (2000, 2013, 2019–21, 2023)	Champions (2021)
Illinois	Chris Tamas	4 (1986–88, 1992)	4 (1987, 1988, 2011, 2018)	Runner-up (2011)
Ohio State	Jen Flynn Oldenburg	3 (1989, 1991, 1994)	2 (1991, 1994)	National semifinal (1991, 1994)
Michigan State	Kristen Kelsay	2 (1995, 1996)	1 (1995)	National semifinal (1995)
Minnesota	Keegan Cook	3 (2002, 2015, 2018)	6 (2003, 2004, 2009, 2015, 2016, 2019)	Runner-up (2004)
Purdue	Dave Shondell	1 (1985)		Regional final (2010, 2020, 2021)
Michigan	Erin Virtue		1 (2012)	National semifinal (2012)
Iowa	Jim Barnes			First Round (1989)
Northwestern	Tim Nollan			Regional semifinal (1981)
Indiana	Steve Aird			Regional semifinal (2010, 2025)
Maryland	Adam Hughes			Second Round (1996)
Rutgers	Caitlin Schweihofer			Qualifying round (1982)
Oregon	Trent Kersten		1 (2012^)	Runner-up (2012^)
UCLA	Alfredo Reft		12 (1981^, 1983^, 1984^, 1985^, 1988^, 1989^, 1990^, 1991^, 1992^, 1994^, 2006^, 2011^)	Champions (1984^, 1990^, 1991^, 2011^)
USC	Brad Keller		10 (1981^, 1982^, 1985^, 2000^, 2002^, 2003^, 2004^, 2007^, 2010^, 2011^)	Champions (1981^, 2002^, 2003^)
Washington	Leslie Gabriel		5 (2004^, 2005^, 2006^, 2013^, 2020^)	Champions (2005^)

† Since 1985, when double round-robin play was introduced
* As a member of the Big 12
^ As a member of the Pac-12

== Conference awards ==
Year	Coach of the Year (media)	School
1988	Mike Hebert	Illinois
1989	Jim Stone	Ohio State
1990	Steve Lowe	Wisconsin
1991	Jim Stone	Ohio State
1992; 1993	Russ Rose	Penn State
1994	Jim Stone	Ohio State
1995	Chuck Erbe	Michigan State
1996	Russ Rose	Penn State
1997	John Cook; Russ Rose	Wisconsin; Penn State
1998	Russ Rose	Penn State
1999	Mike Hebert	Minnesota
2000; 2001	Pete Waite	Wisconsin
2002	Mike Hebert	Minnesota
2003	Don Hardin; Russ Rose	Illinois; Penn State
2004	Jim Stone	Ohio State
2005; 2006; 2007; 2008; 2009; 2010	Russ Rose	Penn State
2011	Dave Shondell	Purdue
2012; 2013	Russ Rose	Penn State
2014	Kelly Sheffield	Wisconsin
2015	Hugh McCutcheon	Minnesota
2016	John Cook	Nebraska
2017	John Cook; Russ Rose	Nebraska; Penn State
2018	Hugh McCutcheon	Minnesota
2019	Russ Rose	Penn State
2020	Jen Flynn Oldenburg	Ohio State
2021	Dave Shondell	Purdue
2022	Kelly Sheffield	Wisconsin
2023	John Cook	Nebraska
2024	Katie Schumacher-Cawley	Penn State
2025; 2026	Dani Busboom Kelly	Nebraska

Year	Player of the Year	School
1983	Martie Larsen	Minnesota
1984; 1985	Marianne Smith	Purdue
1986	Mary Eggers	Illinois
1987	Mary Eggers; Nancy Brookhart	Illinois; Illinois
1988	Mary Eggers	Illinois
1989	Holly O'Leary	Ohio State
1990	Lisa Boyd	Wisconsin
1991	Lelsa Wissler	Ohio State
1992	Leanne Kling	Penn State
1993	Salima Davidson	Penn State
1994	Laura Davis	Ohio State
1995	Terri Zemaitis	Penn State
1996	Vanessa Wouters	Ohio State
1997; 1998	Bonnie Bremner	Penn State
1999	Lauren Cacciamani	Penn State
2000	Nicole Branagh; Sherisa Livingston	Minnesota; Wisconsin
2001	Lizzy Fitzgerald	Wisconsin
2002	Stacey Gordon	Ohio State
2003	Cassie Busse	Minnesota
2004	Stacey Gordon	Ohio State
2005	Sam Tortorello	Penn State
2006	Megan Hodge	Penn State
2007	Christa Harmotto	Penn State
2008	Nicole Fawcett	Penn State
2009	Megan Hodge	Penn State
2010	Blair Brown	Penn State
2011	Ariel Turner	Purdue
2012	Ariel Scott	Penn State
2013	Kelsey Robinson	Nebraska
2014	Lauren Carlini	Wisconsin
2015	Daly Santana	Minnesota
2016	Sarah Wilhite	Minnesota
2017	Simone Lee	Penn State
2018	Samantha Seliger-Swenson	Minnesota
2019	Dana Rettke	Wisconsin
2020; 2021	Stephanie Samedy	Minnesota
2022	Taylor Landfair	Minnesota
2023; 2024	Sarah Franklin	Wisconsin
2025	Bergen Reilly	Nebraska
2026	Kennedy Martin	Penn State

Year	Freshman of the Year	School
1983	Kathy Greishelm	Iowa
1984	Karen Dunham	Indiana
1985	Mary Eggers	Illinois
1986	Debbie McDonald	Purdue
1987	Dawn Thompson	Minnesota
1988	Lelsa Wissler	Ohio State
1989	Sheri Stout	Indiana
1990	Kristin Henriksen	Illinois
1991	Laura Davis	Ohio State
1992	Jenny Jackson	Ohio State
1993	Katrien DeDecker	Minnesota
1994	Erin Borske	Illinois
1995	Jenna Wrobel	Michigan State
1996	Bonnie Bremner	Penn State
1997	Dana Stearns	Ohio State
1998	Sherisa Livingston	Wisconsin
1999	Katie Virtue	Ohio State
2000	Claudia Rodriguez	Wisconsin
2001	Stacey Gordon	Ohio State
2002	Sam Tortorello	Penn State
2003	Cassy Salyer	Penn State
2004	Kate Price	Penn State
2005	Nicole Fawcett	Penn State
2006	Megan Hodge	Penn State
2007	Arielle Wilson	Penn State
2008	Michelle Bartsch	Illinois
2009	Darcy Dorton	Penn State
2010	Deja McClendon	Penn State
2011	Micha Hancock	Penn State
2012	Megan Courtney	Penn State
2013	Lauren Carlini	Wisconsin
2014	Haleigh Washington	Penn State
2015	Samantha Seliger-Swenson	Minnesota
2016	Molly Haggerty	Wisconsin
2017	Dana Rettke	Wisconsin
2018	Jonni Parker	Penn State
2019	Madi Kubik	Nebraska
2020	Emily Londot	Ohio State
2021	Julia Orzol	Wisconsin
2022	Eva Hudson	Purdue
2023	Harper Murray	Nebraska
2024	Izzy Starck	Penn State
2025	Alanah Clemente	Oregon
2026	Decleise Champion	Wisconsin

Year	Setter of the Year	School
2012; 2013	Micha Hancock	Penn State
2014; 2015	Lauren Carlini	Wisconsin
2016	Samantha Seliger-Swenson	Minnesota
2017	Kelly Hunter	Nebraska
2018	Jordyn Poulter; Samantha Seliger-Swenson	Illinois; Minnesota
2019; 2020; 2021	Sydney Hilley	Wisconsin
2022	Mac Podraza	Ohio State
2023; 2024; 2025; 2026	Bergen Reilly	Nebraska

Year	Defensive Player of the Year	School
2001	Shaddia Haddad	Illinois
2002; 2003; 2004	Paula Gentil	Minnesota
2005	Kaleena Walters	Penn State
2006	Malama Peniata	Minnesota
2007	Stesha Selsky	Michigan
2008	Christine Tan	Minnesota
2009	Kate Nobilio	Northwestern
2010	Jessica Granquist	Minnesota
2011	Katie Slay	Penn State
2012; 2013	Kori Moster	Michigan State
2014	Taylor Morey	Wisconsin
2015; 2016	Justine Wong-Orantes	Nebraska
2017	Haleigh Washington	Penn State
2018; 2019	Kendall White	Penn State
2020	Jena Otec	Purdue
2021	Lexi Rodriguez	Nebraska
2022	Kylie Murr	Ohio State
2023; 2024	Lexi Rodriguez	Nebraska
2025	Gillian Grimes	Penn State
2026	Olivia Mauch	Nebraska

== Big Ten volleyball in the AVCA ==
The American Volleyball Coaches Association (AVCA) annually awards National Coach of the Year, Player of the Year, and Freshman of the Year. Since 2025, they also recognized positional national player of the year awards. The following lists coaches and players from the Big Ten who have received these awards.

=== National Coach of the Year ===
- 1985 – Mike Hebert, Illinois
- 1990 – Russ Rose, Penn State
- 1995 – Chuck Erbe, Michigan State
- 1997 – Russ Rose, Penn State
- 2007 – Russ Rose, Penn State
- 2008 – Russ Rose, Penn State
- 2013 – Russ Rose, Penn State
- 2015 – Hugh McCutcheon, Minnesota
- 2023 – John Cook, Nebraska

=== National Player of the Year ===
- 1994 – Laura Davis, Ohio State
- 1999 – Lauren Cacciamani, Penn State
- 2004 – Stacey Gordon, Ohio State
- 2008 – Nicole Fawcett, Penn State
- 2009 – Megan Hodge, Penn State
- 2014 – Micha Hancock, Penn State
- 2016 – Sarah Wilhite, Minnesota
- 2021 – Dana Rettke, Wisconsin
- 2023 – Sarah Franklin, Wisconsin

=== National Freshman of the Year ===
- 2001 – Stacey Gordon, Ohio State
- 2005 – Nicole Fawcett, Penn State
- 2006 – Megan Hodge, Penn State
- 2010 – Deja McClendon, Penn State
- 2014 – Ali Frantti, Penn State
- 2017 – Dana Rettke, Wisconsin
- 2020 – Emily Londot, Ohio State
- 2021 – Lexi Rodriguez, Nebraska
- 2024 – Izzy Starck, Penn State

=== Positional Awards ===
In 2025, the AVCA announced they will begin awarding positional awards in addition to the historical National Freshman, Coach, and Player of the Year Awards. The following players have received these awards from the Big Ten Conference:

==== Outside Hitter of the Year ====
- 2025 – Mimi Coyler, Wisconsin

==== Setter of the Year ====
- 2025 – Bergen Reilly, Nebraska

==== Middle Blocker of the Year ====
- 2025 – Andi Jackson, Nebraska
