= 2022 NCAA Division I women's volleyball tournament =

Volleyball competition

2022 NCAA women's Division I volleyball tournament
- Finals site: CHI Health Center Omaha; Omaha, Nebraska
- Champions: Texas (3rd NCAA (4th national) title)
- Runner-up: Louisville (1st title match)
- Semifinalists: San Diego (1st Final Four); Pittsburgh (2nd Final Four)
- Winning coach: Jerritt Elliott (2nd title)
- Most outstanding player: Logan Eggleston (Texas)
- Final Four All-Tournament Team: Saige Ka'aha'aina-Torres (Texas); Asjia O'Neal (Texas); Madisen Skinner (Texas); Claire Chaussee (Louisville); Anna DeBeer (Louisville); Aiko Jones (Louisville)

The 2022 NCAA Division I women's volleyball tournament was a single-elimination tournament of 64 teams that determined the National Collegiate Athletic Association (NCAA) Division I women's volleyball national champion for the 2022 season. The 42nd edition of the tournament began on December 1, 2022, in various college campuses across the country, location determinations were chosen based on participating teams seedings. The tournament concluded with the championship game at CHI Health Center in Omaha on December 17, when Texas defeated Louisville 3–0. The win gave Texas its 4th national title and first since 2012.

The 2022 NCAA tournament was the first time that 32 teams were seeded (previously, only 16 national seeds were awarded). For the first time since 2013, Texas earned the number 1 overall seed. Louisville, defending 2021 NCAA champion Wisconsin, and Stanford, rounded out the overall number 2–4 national seeds. Penn State, the no. 4 regional seed in the Wisconsin bracket, earned its 42nd straight bid to the NCAA tournament, remaining the only Division I team to participate in every NCAA tournament since its inception in 1981.

Among the Power Five conferences, the SEC led all conferences with seven bids, followed by the Big Ten and Pac-12 with six each, and the ACC and Big 12 with five each.

Throughout the first two rounds of play, only one top four regional seeded team failed to advance to the Sweet 16 (No. 4 Creighton in the Stanford regional). The Big Ten conference recorded the best win/loss record in the first two rounds, going 11–1 in matches played and advancing 5 of 6 teams to the Sweet 16. Additionally, only three non-Power five conference teams advanced past the second round (San Diego, Marquette, and Houston). The wins gave Houston the program's first NCAA tournament match win since the 1994 tournament.

Texas, Louisville, Pittsburgh, and San Diego advanced to the final four. Pittsburgh's upset win over Wisconsin and Texas's defeat of Ohio State snapped a 14-year streak of at least one Big Ten conference team in the final four. Stanford and Oregon's losses also shut out the Pac-12 from advancing, marking the first time in the 42-year history of the NCAA tournament that no final four teams came from the Big Ten or Pac 12 conference. San Diego advanced to its first final four in school history after upsetting Stanford 3–2. Louisville and Pittsburgh advanced to its second straight final four, setting up a rematch between the ACC foes; they split their regular season matches, handing each other its only conference loss of the season as they ultimately won a share of the conference title.

== Tournament Schedule and Venues ==
2022 NCAA First and Second Round venues

First and Second Rounds (Subregionals)

- December 1–4
  - Gregory Gymnasium, Austin, Texas (Host: University of Texas)
  - Al McGuire Center, Milwaukee, Wisconsin (Host: Marquette University)
  - Memorial Coliseum, Lexington, Kentucky (Host: University of Kentucky)
  - Jenny Craig Pavilion, San Diego, California (Host: University of San Diego)
  - Bob Devaney Sports Center, Lincoln, Nebraska (Host: University of Nebraska–Lincoln)
  - Ferrell Center, Waco, Texas (Host: Baylor University)
  - L&N Federal Credit Union Arena, Louisville, Kentucky (Host: University of Louisville)
  - O'Connell Center, Gainesville, Florida (Host: University of Florida)
  - Petersen Events Center, Pittsburgh, Pennsylvania (Host: University of Pittsburgh)
  - UW Field House, Madison, Wisconsin (Host: University of Wisconsin)
  - Maples Pavilion, Palo Alto, California (Host: Stanford University)
  - Rec Hall, University Park, Pennsylvania, (Host: Penn State University)
  - Covelli Center, Columbus, Ohio (Host: Ohio State University)
  - Maturi Pavilion, Minneapolis, Minnesota (Host: University of Minnesota)
  - Matthew Knight Arena, Eugene, Oregon (Host: University of Oregon)
  - Sokol Arena, Omaha, Nebraska (Host: Creighton University)
2022 NCAA Regionals and Final Four

Regional Semifinals and Finals

- December 8 & 10
  - Austin Regional, Gregory Gymnasium (Host: University of Texas)
  - Louisville Regional, Freedom Hall (Host: University of Louisville)
  - Madison Regional, Wisconsin Field House (Host: University of Wisconsin)
  - Palo Alto Regional, Maples Pavilion (Host: Stanford University)

National Semifinals and Championship

- December 15 & 17
  - CHI Health Center Omaha, Omaha, Nebraska (Host: University of Nebraska–Lincoln)

== Qualifying Teams ==
=== Automatic Qualifiers ===
Conference	Team	Conference Record
ACC	Louisville	17–1
America East	UMBC	7–3
American	Houston	19–1
Atlantic 10	Loyola Chicago	17–1
Atlantic Sun	Florida Gulf Coast	13–3
Big 12	Texas	15–1
Big East	Creighton	17–1
Big Sky	Northern Colorado	13–3
Big South	High Point	14–2
Big Ten	Wisconsin	19–1
Big West	Hawaiʻi	19–1
Colonial	Towson	15–1
C-USA	Rice	13–1
Horizon	Wright State	18–0
Ivy	Yale	13–1
MAAC	Quinnipiac	10–8
MAC	Bowling Green	15–3
MEAC	Delaware State	11–3
Missouri Valley	Northern Iowa	17–1
Mountain West	Utah State	11–7
Northeast	Fairleigh Dickinson	9–5
Ohio Valley	Tennessee State	10–8
Pac-12	Stanford	19–1
Patriot	Colgate	14–2
SEC	Florida	15–3
Southern	Samford	11–5
Southland	Southeastern Louisiana	13–5
SWAC	Florida A&M	15–1
Summit	South Dakota	16–2
Sun Belt	James Madison	15–1
West Coast	San Diego	18–0
WAC	Stephen F. Austin	11–3

=== Tournament seeds ===
Austin Regional
Seed	RPI	School	Conference	Berth type	Record
1	1	Texas	Big 12	Automatic	22–1
2	8	Minnesota	Big Ten	At–Large	20–8
3	7	Ohio State	Big Ten	At–Large	19–9
4	14	Marquette	Big East	At–Large	27–3
5	20	Georgia Tech	ACC	At–Large	20–7
6	25	Southern California	Pac-12	At–Large	21–10
7	30	Florida State	ACC	At–Large	19–10
8	32	Towson	Colonial	Automatic	29–1
	51	Ball State	MAC	At–Large	24–8
	266	Fairleigh Dickinson	Northeast	Automatic	17–15
	38	Georgia	SEC	At–Large	22–7
	52	High Point	Big South	Automatic	23–9
	41	Northern Iowa	Missouri Valley	Automatic	26–7
	138	Southeastern Louisiana	Southland	Automatic	25–7
	221	Tennessee State	Ohio Valley	Automatic	19–15
	47	Wright State	Horizon	Automatic	28–3

Madison Regional
Seed	RPI	School	Conference	Berth type	Record
1	4	Wisconsin	Big Ten	Automatic	25–3
2	3	Pittsburgh	ACC	At–Large	27–3
3	11	Florida	SEC	Automatic	23–5
4	19	Penn State	Big Ten	At–Large	24–7
5	17	UCF	American	At–Large	27–1
6	31	Iowa State	Big 12	At–Large	25–5
7	26	BYU	West Coast	At–Large	21–6
8	37	Washington	Pac-12	At–Large	20–10
	66	Colgate	Patriot	Automatic	24–5
	211	Florida A&M	SWAC	Automatic	21–12
	33	Florida Gulf Coast	Atlantic Sun	Automatic	26–6
	21	James Madison	Sun Belt	Automatic	24–4
	252	Quinnipiac	MAAC	Automatic	14–14
	39	TCU	Big 12	At–Large	16–10
	73	UMBC	America East	Automatic	17–8
	29	Yale	Ivy League	Automatic	23–2

Palo Alto Regional
Seed	RPI	School	Conference	Berth type	Record
1	5	Stanford	Pac-12	Automatic	24–4
2	6	San Diego	West Coast	Automatic	27–1
3	10	Kentucky	SEC	At–Large	20–7
4	12	Creighton	Big East	Automatic	27–4
5	18	Houston	American	Automatic	28–3
6	22	Western Kentucky	C-USA	At–Large	28–3
7	34	Washington State	Pac-12	At–Large	22–9
8	36	Hawaiʻi	Big West	Automatic	22–6
	50	Auburn	SEC	At–Large	21–8
	42	Bowling Green	MAC	Automatic	22–9
	74	Loyola Chicago	Atlantic 10	Automatic	25–8
	48	LSU	SEC	At–Large	15–13
	89	Northern Colorado	Big Sky	Automatic	22–8
	45	Pepperdine	West Coast	At–Large	19–10
	40	South Dakota	Summit	Automatic	29–3
	24	UNLV	Mountain West	At–Large	26–4

Louisville Regional
Seed	RPI	School	Conference	Berth type	Record
1	2	Louisville	ACC	Automatic	26–2
2	9	Nebraska	Big Ten	At–Large	24–5
3	13	Oregon	Pac-12	At–Large	23–5
4	16	Baylor	Big 12	At–Large	23–6
5	15	Rice	C-USA	At–Large	26–3
6	23	Arkansas	SEC	At–Large	20–8
7	35	Miami (FL)	ACC	At–Large	19–10
8	27	Purdue	Big Ten	At–Large	20–10
	44	Colorado	Pac-12	At–Large	20–10
	177	Delaware State	MEAC	Automatic	23–6
	28	Kansas	Big 12	At–Large	18–10
	49	Loyola Marymount	West Coast	At–Large	18–9
	122	Samford	Southern	Automatic	19–12
	53	Stephen F. Austin	WAC	Automatic	26–4
	56	Tennessee	SEC	At–Large	17–13
	46	Utah State	Mountain West	Automatic	22–10

== Bracket ==
=== Austin, TX Regional ===
First round December 1 & 2
1	Texas	3
Fairleigh Dickinson	0
Austin, TX
Georgia	3
8	Towson	1
5	Georgia Tech	3
Wright State	0
Milwaukee, WI
Ball State	0
4	Marquette	3
3	Ohio State	3
Tennessee State	0
Columbus, OH
High Point	0
6	Southern California	3
7	Florida State	0
Northern Iowa	3
Minneapolis, MN
Southeastern Louisiana	0
2	Minnesota	3

Second round December 2 & 3
1	Texas	3
Georgia	0
5	Georgia Tech	0
4	Marquette	3
3	Ohio State	3
6	Southern California	0
Northern Iowa	0
2	Minnesota	3

Regional semifinals December 8
1	Texas	3
4	Marquette	1
3	Ohio State	3
2	Minnesota	1

Regional finals December 10
1	Texas	3
3	Ohio State	1

==== Schedule ====
===== First round =====
December 1, 2022; 4:00 p.m. CST	(5) Georgia Tech	3–0	Wright State	Al McGuire Center, Milwaukee, Wisconsin; Attendance: 1,200; Referees: Julie Voeck, Krystian Krzyzak, Scott Prox, Alexis Sheldon
December 1, 2022; 4:00 p.m. CST	(25–13, 25–14, 25–17); Report			Al McGuire Center, Milwaukee, Wisconsin; Attendance: 1,200; Referees: Julie Voeck, Krystian Krzyzak, Scott Prox, Alexis Sheldon

December 1, 2022; 5:00 p.m. CST	Georgia	3–1	(8) Towson	Gregory Gymnasium, Austin, Texas; Attendance: 604; Referees: April Fricke, Richard Bleau, Chez Slayton, Dave Plaisance
December 1, 2022; 5:00 p.m. CST	(25–10, 25–23, 21–25, 25–20); Report			Gregory Gymnasium, Austin, Texas; Attendance: 604; Referees: April Fricke, Richard Bleau, Chez Slayton, Dave Plaisance

December 1, 2022; 7:00 p.m. CST	Ball State	0–3	(4) Marquette	Al McGuire Center, Milwaukee, Wisconsin; Attendance: 2,064; Referees: Christina Fiebich, Jim Kuziela, Krystian Krzyzak, Philip Coughlin
December 1, 2022; 7:00 p.m. CST	(20–25, 17–25, 17–25); Report			Al McGuire Center, Milwaukee, Wisconsin; Attendance: 2,064; Referees: Christina Fiebich, Jim Kuziela, Krystian Krzyzak, Philip Coughlin

December 1, 2022; 8:00 p.m. CST	(1) Texas	3–0	Fairleigh Dickinson	Gregory Gymnasium, Austin, Texas; Attendance: 4,172; Referees: Thang Nguyen, Carlos Tamez, Talita Benevides, Blaine Halberstadt
December 1, 2022; 8:00 p.m. CST	(25–6, 25–13, 25–13); Report			Gregory Gymnasium, Austin, Texas; Attendance: 4,172; Referees: Thang Nguyen, Carlos Tamez, Talita Benevides, Blaine Halberstadt

December 2, 2022; 4:00 p.m. CST	High Point	0–3	(6) Southern California	Covelli Center, Columbus, Ohio; Referees: Stephen Shepherd, Landry Homsher, Jeff Kline, Mary Gray
December 2, 2022; 4:00 p.m. CST	(19–25, 19–25, 20–25); Report			Covelli Center, Columbus, Ohio; Referees: Stephen Shepherd, Landry Homsher, Jeff Kline, Mary Gray

December 2, 2022; 4:30 p.m. CST	(7) Florida State	0–3	Northern Iowa	Maturi Pavilion, Minneapolis, Minnesota; Referees: Tim Harlow, Robyn Courchane, Sarah Myres, Kendrick Paulson
December 2, 2022; 4:30 p.m. CST	(24–26, 19–25, 21–25); Report			Maturi Pavilion, Minneapolis, Minnesota; Referees: Tim Harlow, Robyn Courchane, Sarah Myres, Kendrick Paulson

December 2, 2022; 6:30 p.m. CST	(3) Ohio State	3–0	Tennessee State	Covelli Center, Columbus, Ohio; Attendance: 3,492; Referees: Nathan Mahaven, Josh Hall, Christy Alltop, Drew Puckrin
December 2, 2022; 6:30 p.m. CST	(25–10, 25–14, 25–15); Report			Covelli Center, Columbus, Ohio; Attendance: 3,492; Referees: Nathan Mahaven, Josh Hall, Christy Alltop, Drew Puckrin

December 2, 2022; 7:00 p.m. CST	Southeastern Louisiana	0–3	(2) Minnesota	Maturi Pavilion, Minneapolis, Minnesota; Attendance: 4,489; Referees: Devonie McLarty, Brad Aaberg, Ted Moser, Brenda DeJesus
December 2, 2022; 7:00 p.m. CST	(21–25, 18–25, 14–25); Report			Maturi Pavilion, Minneapolis, Minnesota; Attendance: 4,489; Referees: Devonie McLarty, Brad Aaberg, Ted Moser, Brenda DeJesus

===== Second round =====
December 2, 2022; 6:00 p.m. CST	(5) Georgia Tech	0–3	(4) Marquette	Al McGuire Center, Milwaukee, Wisconsin; Attendance: 2,066; Referees: Julie Voeck, Jim Kuziela, Henry Chen, Alexis Sheldon
December 2, 2022; 6:00 p.m. CST	(23–25, 20–25, 19–25); Report			Al McGuire Center, Milwaukee, Wisconsin; Attendance: 2,066; Referees: Julie Voeck, Jim Kuziela, Henry Chen, Alexis Sheldon

December 2, 2022; 8:00 p.m. CST	(1) Texas	3–0	Georgia	Gregory Gymnasium, Austin, Texas; Attendance: 4,812; Referees: Thang Nguyen, Carlos Tamez, Blaine Halberstadt, Talita Benavides
December 2, 2022; 8:00 p.m. CST	(25–14, 25–16, 25–15); Report			Gregory Gymnasium, Austin, Texas; Attendance: 4,812; Referees: Thang Nguyen, Carlos Tamez, Blaine Halberstadt, Talita Benavides

December 3, 2022; 5:00 p.m. CST	(3) Ohio State	3–0	(6) Southern California	Covelli Center, Columbus, Ohio; Attendance: 2,874; Referees: Stephen Shepherd, Josh Hall, Christy Alltop, Drew Puckrin
December 3, 2022; 5:00 p.m. CST	(25–21, 25–17, 25–16); Report			Covelli Center, Columbus, Ohio; Attendance: 2,874; Referees: Stephen Shepherd, Josh Hall, Christy Alltop, Drew Puckrin

December 3, 2022; 7:00 p.m. CST	Northern Iowa	0–3	(2) Minnesota	Maturi Pavilion, Minneapolis, Minnesota; Attendance: 4,671; Referees: Devonie McLarty, Robyn Courchane, Sarah Myres, Kendrick Paulson
December 3, 2022; 7:00 p.m. CST	(18–25, 16–25, 15–25); Report			Maturi Pavilion, Minneapolis, Minnesota; Attendance: 4,671; Referees: Devonie McLarty, Robyn Courchane, Sarah Myres, Kendrick Paulson

===== Regional semifinals =====
December 8, 2022; 11:00 a.m. CST	(3) Ohio State	3–1	(2) Minnesota	Gregory Gymnasium, Austin, Texas; Referees: Pati Rolf, Rod Rodriguez, Talita Benavides, Shera Moxley
December 8, 2022; 11:00 a.m. CST	(22–25, 25–21, 25–21, 25–19); Report			Gregory Gymnasium, Austin, Texas; Referees: Pati Rolf, Rod Rodriguez, Talita Benavides, Shera Moxley

December 8, 2022; 1:30 p.m. CST	(1) Texas	3–1	(4) Marquette	Gregory Gymnasium, Austin, Texas; Attendance: 4,491; Referees: Thang Nguyen, Bill Stanley, Nate Wagner, Bev Rea
December 8, 2022; 1:30 p.m. CST	(25–14, 25–13, 19–25, 25–17); Report			Gregory Gymnasium, Austin, Texas; Attendance: 4,491; Referees: Thang Nguyen, Bill Stanley, Nate Wagner, Bev Rea

===== Regional finals =====
December 10, 2022; 5:00 p.m. CST	(1) Texas	3–1	(3) Ohio State	Gregory Gymnasium, Austin, Texas; Attendance: 5,344; Referees: Pati Rolf, Bill Stanley, Beverly Rae, Talita Benavides
December 10, 2022; 5:00 p.m. CST	(25–18, 21–25, 25–13, 25–21); Report			Gregory Gymnasium, Austin, Texas; Attendance: 5,344; Referees: Pati Rolf, Bill Stanley, Beverly Rae, Talita Benavides

==== Region all-tournament team ====
The following players were named to the Texas regional all-tournament team:

- Logan Eggleston (Texas) – Most Outstanding Player
- Zoe Fleck (Texas)
- Asjia O'Neal (Texas)
- Emily Londot (Ohio State)
- Gabby Gonzales (Ohio State)
- Hattie Bray (Marquette)
- Jenna Wenaas (Minnesota)

=== Palo Alto, CA Regional ===
First round December 1 & 2
2	San Diego	3
Northern Colorado	1
San Diego, CA
UNLV	0
7	Washington State	3
6	Western Kentucky	3
Bowling Green	0
Lexington, KY
Loyola Chicago	0
3	Kentucky	3
4	Creighton	2
Auburn	3
Omaha, NE
South Dakota	2
5	Houston	3
8	Hawaiʻi	1
LSU	3
Palo Alto, CA
Pepperdine	1
1	Stanford	3

Second round December 2 & 3
2	San Diego	3
7	Washington State	1
6	Western Kentucky	0
3	Kentucky	3
Auburn	2
5	Houston	3
LSU	0
1	Stanford	3

Regional semifinals December 8
2	San Diego	3
3	Kentucky	0
5	Houston	0
1	Stanford	3

Regional finals December 10
2	San Diego	3
1	Stanford	2

==== Schedule ====
===== First round =====
December 1, 2022; 3:30 p.m. CST	(6) Western Kentucky	3–0	Bowling Green	Memorial Coliseum, Lexington, Kentucky; Referees: Michelle Prater, Michael O'Connor, Barry Woosley, Phillip Ems
December 1, 2022; 3:30 p.m. CST	(25–20, 25–23, 25–20); Report			Memorial Coliseum, Lexington, Kentucky; Referees: Michelle Prater, Michael O'Connor, Barry Woosley, Phillip Ems

December 1, 2022; 6:30 p.m. CST	Loyola Chicago	0–3	(3) Kentucky	Memorial Coliseum, Lexington, Kentucky; Attendance: 2,293; Referees: Bill Thornburgh, Kevin Wendelboe, Bev Rea, Shane White
December 1, 2022; 6:30 p.m. CST	(17–25, 14–25, 20–25); Report			Memorial Coliseum, Lexington, Kentucky; Attendance: 2,293; Referees: Bill Thornburgh, Kevin Wendelboe, Bev Rea, Shane White

December 1, 2022; 7:00 p.m. CST	UNLV	0–3	(7) Washington State	Jenny Craig Pavilion, San Diego, California; Attendance: 659; Referees: Patsy Malta, Kaili Kimura, Andrew Shiheiber, Rachel Jensen
December 1, 2022; 7:00 p.m. CST	(24–26, 19–25, 18–25); Report			Jenny Craig Pavilion, San Diego, California; Attendance: 659; Referees: Patsy Malta, Kaili Kimura, Andrew Shiheiber, Rachel Jensen

December 1, 2022; 9:30 p.m. CST	(2) San Diego	3–1	Northern Colorado	Jenny Craig Pavilion, San Diego, California; Attendance: 2,667; Referees: Kevin Cull, Nikki Kathol, Robert Reyees, Heather Pickett
December 1, 2022; 9:30 p.m. CST	(25–21, 25–14, 21–25, 25–11); Report			Jenny Craig Pavilion, San Diego, California; Attendance: 2,667; Referees: Kevin Cull, Nikki Kathol, Robert Reyees, Heather Pickett

December 2, 2022; 3:30 p.m. CST	South Dakota	2–3	(5) Houston	Sokol Arena, Omaha, Nebraska; Referees: Lena Gustafson, Todd Karolczak, Kelsi Jurik, Jodie Wielenga
December 2, 2022; 3:30 p.m. CST	(14–25, 19–25, 25–18, 25–23, 11–15); Report			Sokol Arena, Omaha, Nebraska; Referees: Lena Gustafson, Todd Karolczak, Kelsi Jurik, Jodie Wielenga

December 2, 2022; 6:30 p.m. CST	(8) Hawaʻi	1–3	LSU	Maples Pavilion, Palo Alto, California; Attendance: 1,436; Referees: Brig Beatie, Eric Asami, Donald Tarin, Neal Meredith
December 2, 2022; 6:30 p.m. CST	(25–21, 19–25, 20–25, 22–25); Report			Maples Pavilion, Palo Alto, California; Attendance: 1,436; Referees: Brig Beatie, Eric Asami, Donald Tarin, Neal Meredith

December 2, 2022; 6:30 p.m. CST	(4) Creighton	2–3	Auburn	Sokol Arena, Omaha, Nebraska; Attendance: 2,653; Referees: Daryl Korinek, Ron Pelham, Ryan Stejskal, Amber Nicholson
December 2, 2022; 6:30 p.m. CST	(25–21, 21–25, 20–25, 25–16, 11–15); Report			Sokol Arena, Omaha, Nebraska; Attendance: 2,653; Referees: Daryl Korinek, Ron Pelham, Ryan Stejskal, Amber Nicholson

December 2, 2022; 9:00 p.m. CST	Pepperdine	1–3	(1) Stanford	Maples Pavilion, Palo Alto, California; Attendance: 2,866; Referees: Sergio Gonzales, Daphne Nelson, Tyrone Toloy, Matt Amaral
December 2, 2022; 9:00 p.m. CST	(11–25, 18–25, 25–18, 20–25); Report			Maples Pavilion, Palo Alto, California; Attendance: 2,866; Referees: Sergio Gonzales, Daphne Nelson, Tyrone Toloy, Matt Amaral

===== Second round =====
December 2, 2022; 6:00 p.m. CST	(6) Western Kentucky	0–3	(3) Kentucky	Memorial Coliseum, Lexington, Kentucky; Attendance: 2,387; Referees: Michelle Prater, Kevin Wendelboe, Shane White, Bev Rea
December 2, 2022; 6:00 p.m. CST	(17–25, 16–25, 21–25); Report			Memorial Coliseum, Lexington, Kentucky; Attendance: 2,387; Referees: Michelle Prater, Kevin Wendelboe, Shane White, Bev Rea

December 2, 2022; 9:30 p.m. CST	(2) San Diego	3–1	(7) Washington State	Jenny Craig Pavilion, San Diego, California; Attendance: Kevin Cull, Kaili Kimura, Rachel Jensen, Heather Pickett; Referees: 2,228
December 2, 2022; 9:30 p.m. CST	(25–19, 25–22, 21–25, 25–15); Report			Jenny Craig Pavilion, San Diego, California; Attendance: Kevin Cull, Kaili Kimura, Rachel Jensen, Heather Pickett; Referees: 2,228

December 3, 2022; 6:30 p.m. CST	Auburn	2–3	(5) Houston	Sokol Arena, Omaha, Nebraska; Attendance: 2,150; Referees: Daryl Korinek, Ron Pelham, Jodie Wielenga, Amber Nicholson
December 3, 2022; 6:30 p.m. CST	(27–25, 15–25, 25–12, 23–25, 8–15); Report			Sokol Arena, Omaha, Nebraska; Attendance: 2,150; Referees: Daryl Korinek, Ron Pelham, Jodie Wielenga, Amber Nicholson

December 3, 2022; 8:00 p.m. CST	LSU	0–3	(1) Stanford	Maples Pavilion, Palo Alto, California; Attendance: 2,797; Referees: Sergio Gonzales, Daphne Nelson, Neal Meredith, Tyrone Toloy
December 3, 2022; 8:00 p.m. CST	(11–25, 15–25, 21–25); Report			Maples Pavilion, Palo Alto, California; Attendance: 2,797; Referees: Sergio Gonzales, Daphne Nelson, Neal Meredith, Tyrone Toloy

===== Regional semifinals =====
December 8, 2022; 7:00 p.m. CST	(2) San Diego	3–0	(3) Kentucky	Maples Pavilion, Palo Alto, California; Attendance: 2,085
December 8, 2022; 7:00 p.m. CST	(25–22, 25–19, 25–18); Report			Maples Pavilion, Palo Alto, California; Attendance: 2,085

December 8, 2022; 9:30 p.m. CST	(5) Houston	0–3	(1) Stanford	Maples Pavilion, Palo Alto, California; Attendance: 2,152; Referees: Michelle Prater, Kaili Kimura, Neal Meredith, Rachel Jensen
December 8, 2022; 9:30 p.m. CST	(24–26, 16–25, 17–25); Report			Maples Pavilion, Palo Alto, California; Attendance: 2,152; Referees: Michelle Prater, Kaili Kimura, Neal Meredith, Rachel Jensen

===== Regional finals =====
December 10, 2022; 9:00 p.m. CST	(2) San Diego	3–2	(1) Stanford	Maples Pavilion, Palo Alto, California; Attendance: 3,309; Referees: Michelle Prater, Paula Martin, Rachel Jensen, Tyrone Toloy
December 10, 2022; 9:00 p.m. CST	(19–25, 25–22, 19–25, 25–23, 15–9); Report			Maples Pavilion, Palo Alto, California; Attendance: 3,309; Referees: Michelle Prater, Paula Martin, Rachel Jensen, Tyrone Toloy

==== Region all-tournament team ====
The following players were named to the Stanford regional all-tournament team:

- Gabby Blossom (San Diego) – Most Outstanding Player
- Katie Lukes (San Diego)
- Grace Frohling (San Diego)
- Kendall Kipp (Stanford)
- Kami Miner (Stanford)
- Elena Oglivie (Stanford)
- Kortlyn Henderson (Houston)

=== Madison, WI Regional ===
First round December 1 & 2
1	Wisconsin	3
Quinnipiac	0
Madison, WI
TCU	3
8	Washington	1
5	UCF	3
Yale	0
University Park, PA
UMBC	0
4	Penn State	3
3	Florida	3
Florida A&M	0
Gainesville, FL
FGCU	2
6	Iowa State	3
7	BYU	3
James Madison	0
Pittsburgh, PA
Colgate	0
2	Pittsburgh	3

Second round December 2 & 3
1	Wisconsin	3
TCU	0
5	UCF	1
4	Penn State	3
3	Florida	3
6	Iowa State	0
7	BYU	0
2	Pittsburgh	3

Regional semifinals December 8
1	Wisconsin	3
4	Penn State	2
3	Florida	1
2	Pittsburgh	3

Regional finals December 10
1	Wisconsin	2
2	Pittsburgh	3

==== Schedule ====
===== First round =====
December 2, 2022; 4:30 p.m. CST	(5) UCF	3–0	Yale	Rec Hall, University Park, Pennsylvania; Referees: Mara Wager, Wade DuBois, Tim Rough, Chad Oberholtzer
December 2, 2022; 4:30 p.m. CST	(25–22, 25–16, 25–17); Report			Rec Hall, University Park, Pennsylvania; Referees: Mara Wager, Wade DuBois, Tim Rough, Chad Oberholtzer

December 2, 2022; 4:30 p.m. CST	TCU	3–1	(8) Washington	UW Field House, Madison, Wisconsin; Referees: Pati Rolf, Dean Hoskin, Chris Haworth, Mark Berman
December 2, 2022; 4:30 p.m. CST	(25–18, 24–26, 25–20, 25–21); Report			UW Field House, Madison, Wisconsin; Referees: Pati Rolf, Dean Hoskin, Chris Haworth, Mark Berman

December 2, 2022; 6:30 p.m. CST	UMBC	0–3	(4) Penn State	Rec Hall, University Park, Pennsylvania; Attendance: 2,403; Referees: Jeff McKinney, Brett Myres, Miguel Jones, David Atkinson
December 2, 2022; 6:30 p.m. CST	(14–25, 17–25, 12–25); Report			Rec Hall, University Park, Pennsylvania; Attendance: 2,403; Referees: Jeff McKinney, Brett Myres, Miguel Jones, David Atkinson

December 2, 2022; 7:00 p.m. CST	(1) Wisconsin	3–0	Quinnipiac	UW Field House, Madison, Wisconsin; Attendance: 7,229; Referees: Tony Chan, Joe Gustafson, Clinque Robinson, Tracy LeVine
December 2, 2022; 7:00 p.m. CST	(25–15, 25–9, 25–4); Report			UW Field House, Madison, Wisconsin; Attendance: 7,229; Referees: Tony Chan, Joe Gustafson, Clinque Robinson, Tracy LeVine

December 2, 2022; 3:00 p.m. CST	(7) BYU	3–0	James Madison	Petersen Events Center, Pittsburgh, Pennsylvania; Attendance: 1,950; Referees: Brian Hemelgarn, Chuck Fleet, Dan Swensen, Kayla Spridik
December 2, 2022; 3:00 p.m. CST	(25–20, 25–10, 25–15); Report			Petersen Events Center, Pittsburgh, Pennsylvania; Attendance: 1,950; Referees: Brian Hemelgarn, Chuck Fleet, Dan Swensen, Kayla Spridik

December 2, 2022; 3:30 p.m. CST	FGCU	2–3	(6) Iowa State	O'Connell Center, Gainesville, Florida; Attendance: 1,123; Referees: Tony Cothron, Darin Clark, Elizabth Smith, Robert Skidmore
December 2, 2022; 3:30 p.m. CST	(14–25, 19–25, 25–23, 25–16, 12–15); Report			O'Connell Center, Gainesville, Florida; Attendance: 1,123; Referees: Tony Cothron, Darin Clark, Elizabth Smith, Robert Skidmore

December 2, 2022; 6:00 p.m. CST	Colgate	0–3	(2) Pittsburgh	Petersen Events Center, Pittsburgh, Pennsylvania; Attendance: 2,667; Referees: Carla Brunner, Rod Rodriguez, Shera Moxley, George Calton
December 2, 2022; 6:00 p.m. CST	(16–25, 14–25, 14–25); Report			Petersen Events Center, Pittsburgh, Pennsylvania; Attendance: 2,667; Referees: Carla Brunner, Rod Rodriguez, Shera Moxley, George Calton

December 2, 2022; 6:00 p.m. CST	(3) Florida	3–0	Florida A&M	O'Connell Center, Gainesville, Florida; Attendance: 2,563; Referees: Mark Prater, Rebecca Carsentsen, Hugh Hernesman, Katie Bates
December 2, 2022; 6:00 p.m. CST	(15–25, 15–25, 9–25); Report			O'Connell Center, Gainesville, Florida; Attendance: 2,563; Referees: Mark Prater, Rebecca Carsentsen, Hugh Hernesman, Katie Bates

===== Second round =====
December 3, 2022; 5:30 p.m. CST	(5) UCF	1–3	(4) Penn State	Rec Hall, University Park, Pennsylvania; Attendance: 2,389; Referees: Jeff McKinney, Wade Dubois, Chad Oberholtzer, David Atkinson
December 3, 2022; 5:30 p.m. CST	(18–25, 25–18, 25–22, 25–21); Report			Rec Hall, University Park, Pennsylvania; Attendance: 2,389; Referees: Jeff McKinney, Wade Dubois, Chad Oberholtzer, David Atkinson

December 3, 2022; 6:00 p.m. CST	(1) Wisconsin	3–0	TCU	UW Field House, Madison, Wisconsin; Attendance: 7,229; Referees: Pati Rolf, Joe Gustafson, Chris Haworth, Tracy Levine
December 3, 2022; 6:00 p.m. CST	(25–9, 25–11, 25–23); Report			UW Field House, Madison, Wisconsin; Attendance: 7,229; Referees: Pati Rolf, Joe Gustafson, Chris Haworth, Tracy Levine

December 3, 2022; 6:00 p.m. CST	(3) Florida	3–0	(6) Iowa State	O'Connell Center, Gainesville, Florida; Attendance: 2,936; Referees: Tony Cothron, Darin Clark, Robert Skidmore, Elizabeth Smith
December 3, 2022; 6:00 p.m. CST	(25–19, 25–23, 25–14); Report			O'Connell Center, Gainesville, Florida; Attendance: 2,936; Referees: Tony Cothron, Darin Clark, Robert Skidmore, Elizabeth Smith

December 3, 2022; 6:00 p.m. CST	(7) BYU	0–3	(2) Pittsburgh	Petersen Events Center, Pittsburgh, Pennsylvania; Attendance: 2,814; Referees: Carla Bruner, Rod Rodriguez, Shera Moxley, Dan Swenson
December 3, 2022; 6:00 p.m. CST	(21–25, 22–25, 18–25); Report			Petersen Events Center, Pittsburgh, Pennsylvania; Attendance: 2,814; Referees: Carla Bruner, Rod Rodriguez, Shera Moxley, Dan Swenson

===== Regional semifinals =====
December 8, 2022; 2:30 p.m. CST	(3) Florida	1–3	(2) Pittsburgh	UW Field House, Madison, Wisconsin; Attendance: 7,229; Referees: Stephen Shepherd, Joe Gustafson, Sarah Myres, Chris Haworth
December 8, 2022; 2:30 p.m. CST	(20–25, 21–25, 25–17, 22–25); Report			UW Field House, Madison, Wisconsin; Attendance: 7,229; Referees: Stephen Shepherd, Joe Gustafson, Sarah Myres, Chris Haworth

December 8, 2022; 5:00 p.m. cst	(1) Wisconsin	3–2	(4) Penn State	UW Field House, Madison, Wisconsin; Attendance: 7,229; Referees: Devonie McLarty, Robyn Courchane, Amber Nicholson, Dan Swensen
December 8, 2022; 5:00 p.m. cst	(25–21, 25–19, 23–25, 20–25, 15–8); Report			UW Field House, Madison, Wisconsin; Attendance: 7,229; Referees: Devonie McLarty, Robyn Courchane, Amber Nicholson, Dan Swensen

===== Regional finals =====
December 10, 2022; 7:00 p.m. CST	(1) Wisconsin	2–3	(2) Pittsburgh	UW Field House, Madison, Wisconsin; Attendance: 7,229; Referees: Stephen Shepherd, Joe Gustafson, Dan Swensen, Amber Nicholson
December 10, 2022; 7:00 p.m. CST	(25–23, 21–25, 21–25, 25–19, 13–15); Report			UW Field House, Madison, Wisconsin; Attendance: 7,229; Referees: Stephen Shepherd, Joe Gustafson, Dan Swensen, Amber Nicholson

==== Region all-tournament team ====
The following players were named to the Wisconsin regional all-tournament team:

- Courtney Buzzerio (Pittsburgh) – Most Outstanding Player
- Rachel Fairbanks (Pittsburgh)
- Chiamaka Nwokolo (Pittsburgh)
- Devyn Robinson (Wisconsin)
- Anna Smrek (Wisconsin)
- Marina Markova (Florida)
- Seleisa Elisaia (Penn State)

=== Louisville, KY Regional ===
First round December 1 & 2
2	Nebraska	3
Delaware State	0
Lincoln, NE
Kansas	3
7	Miami (FL)	0
6	Arkansas	3
Utah State	0
Eugene, OR
Loyola Marymount	0
3	Oregon	3
4	Baylor	3
Stephen F. Austin	0
Waco, TX
Colorado	1
5	Rice	3
8	Purdue	3
Tennessee	2
Louisville, KY
Samford	0
1	Louisville	3

Second round December 2 & 3
2	Nebraska	3
Kansas	1
6	Arkansas	1
3	Oregon	3
4	Baylor	3
5	Rice	2
8	Purdue	0
1	Louisville	3

Regional semifinals December 8
2	Nebraska	2
3	Oregon	3
4	Baylor	0
1	Louisville	3

Regional finals December 10
3	Oregon	2
1	Louisville	3

==== Schedule ====
===== First round =====
December 1, 2022; 4:30 p.m. CST	Kansas	3–0	(7) Miami (FL)	Devaney Center, Lincoln, Nebraska; Referees: Mary Faragher, Bill Stanley, Mike Behrens, Nathan Wagner
December 1, 2022; 4:30 p.m. CST	(25–17, 25–18, 25–20); Report			Devaney Center, Lincoln, Nebraska; Referees: Mary Faragher, Bill Stanley, Mike Behrens, Nathan Wagner

December 1, 2022; 4:30 p.m. CST	Colorado	1–3	(5) Rice	Ferrell Center, Waco, Texas; Attendance: 441; Referees: Mary Blalock, Rachael Rodriguez, Laura Cortazar, Kendra Corneliusen
December 1, 2022; 4:30 p.m. CST	(24–26, 26–24, 16–25, 14–25); Report			Ferrell Center, Waco, Texas; Attendance: 441; Referees: Mary Blalock, Rachael Rodriguez, Laura Cortazar, Kendra Corneliusen

December 1, 2022; 7:00 p.m. CST	(2) Nebraska	3–0	Delaware State	Devaney Center, Lincoln, Nebraska; Attendance: 8,062; Referees: Mike Hamilton, Wade Brence, Ken Corum, Lisa Kresha
December 1, 2022; 7:00 p.m. CST	(25–15, 25–9, 25–10); Report			Devaney Center, Lincoln, Nebraska; Attendance: 8,062; Referees: Mike Hamilton, Wade Brence, Ken Corum, Lisa Kresha

December 1, 2022; 7:00 p.m. CST	(4) Baylor	3–0	Stephen F. Austin	Ferrell Center, Waco, Texas; Attendance: 1,402; Referees: Joe Lizama, Janna TerMolen, Laura Cortazar, Kendra Corneliusen
December 1, 2022; 7:00 p.m. CST	(25–13, 25–18, 25–15); Report			Ferrell Center, Waco, Texas; Attendance: 1,402; Referees: Joe Lizama, Janna TerMolen, Laura Cortazar, Kendra Corneliusen

December 2, 2022; 3:00 p.m. CST	(8) Purdue	3–2	Tennessee	L&N Federal Credit Union Arena, Louisville, Kentucky; Referees: Jung Park, Marty Prochko, Jennifer Leffler, John Hunley
December 2, 2022; 3:00 p.m. CST	(14–25, 25–14, 22–25, 25–22, 15–11); Report			L&N Federal Credit Union Arena, Louisville, Kentucky; Referees: Jung Park, Marty Prochko, Jennifer Leffler, John Hunley

December 2, 2022; 6:00 p.m. CST	(6) Arkansas	3–0	Utah State	Matthew Knight Arena, Eugene, Oregon; Referees: Ryan MacDowell, Paula Martin, Michelle Davis, Greg Clark
December 2, 2022; 6:00 p.m. CST	(25–19, 25–15, 25–14); Report			Matthew Knight Arena, Eugene, Oregon; Referees: Ryan MacDowell, Paula Martin, Michelle Davis, Greg Clark

December 2, 2022; 6:00 p.m. CST	Samford	0–3	(1) Louisville	L&N Federal Credit Union Arena, Louisville, Kentucky; Attendance: 933; Referees: Donnie Goodwin, Scott Thompson, Kyp Harasymowycz, Mark Booker
December 2, 2022; 6:00 p.m. CST	(9–25, 13–25, 12–25); Report			L&N Federal Credit Union Arena, Louisville, Kentucky; Attendance: 933; Referees: Donnie Goodwin, Scott Thompson, Kyp Harasymowycz, Mark Booker

December 2, 2022; 9:00 p.m. CST	Loyola Marymount	0–3	(3) Oregon	Matthew Knight Arena, Eugene, Oregon; Attendance: 3,474; Referees: Maile Jewkes, Dan Houser, Kellie Demianew, Hector Escobar
December 2, 2022; 9:00 p.m. CST	(17–25, 22–25, 15–25); Report			Matthew Knight Arena, Eugene, Oregon; Attendance: 3,474; Referees: Maile Jewkes, Dan Houser, Kellie Demianew, Hector Escobar

===== Second round =====
December 2, 2022; 7:00 p.m. CST	(2) Nebraska	3–1	Kansas	Devaney Center, Lincoln, Nebraska; Attendance: 8,235; Referees: Mike Hamilton, Bill Stanley, Ken Corum, Nathan Wagner
December 2, 2022; 7:00 p.m. CST	(25–14, 25–18, 19–25, 26–24); Report			Devaney Center, Lincoln, Nebraska; Attendance: 8,235; Referees: Mike Hamilton, Bill Stanley, Ken Corum, Nathan Wagner

December 2, 2022; 7:00 p.m. CST	(4) Baylor	3–2	(5) Rice	Ferrell Center, Waco, Texas; Attendance: 1,007; Referees: Joe Lizama, Janna TerMolen, Bryce Estes, Blair Gillard
December 2, 2022; 7:00 p.m. CST	(16–25, 25–22, 25–23, 14–25, 15–11); Report			Ferrell Center, Waco, Texas; Attendance: 1,007; Referees: Joe Lizama, Janna TerMolen, Bryce Estes, Blair Gillard

December 3, 2022; 5:00 p.m. CST	(8) Purdue	0–3	(1) Louisville	L&N Federal Credit Union Arena, Louisville, Kentucky; Attendance: 984; Referees: Jung Park, Scott Thompson, Jennifer Leffler, Kyp Harasymowycz
December 3, 2022; 5:00 p.m. CST	(19–25, 21–25, 23–25); Report			L&N Federal Credit Union Arena, Louisville, Kentucky; Attendance: 984; Referees: Jung Park, Scott Thompson, Jennifer Leffler, Kyp Harasymowycz

December 3, 2022; 9:00 p.m. CST	(6) Arkansas	1–3	(3) Oregon	Matthew Knight Arena, Eugene, Oregon; Attendance: 3,014; Referees: Ryan MacDowell, Paula Martin, Michelle Davis, Kelli Demainew
December 3, 2022; 9:00 p.m. CST	(25–19, 20–25, 20–25, 9–25); Report			Matthew Knight Arena, Eugene, Oregon; Attendance: 3,014; Referees: Ryan MacDowell, Paula Martin, Michelle Davis, Kelli Demainew

===== Regional semifinals =====
December 8, 2022; 10:00 a.m. CST	(2) Nebraska	2–3	(3) Oregon	KFC Yum! Center, Louisville, Kentucky; Referees: Jung Park, Wade DuBois, Kyp Harasymowycz, Drew Puckertin
December 8, 2022; 10:00 a.m. CST	(25–14, 24–26, 25–22, 30–32, 11–15); Report			KFC Yum! Center, Louisville, Kentucky; Referees: Jung Park, Wade DuBois, Kyp Harasymowycz, Drew Puckertin

December 8, 2022; 12:30 p.m. CST	(4) Baylor	0–3	(1) Louisville	KFC Yum! Center, Louisville, Kentucky; Attendance: 5,002; Referees: Ryan MacDowell, Daphne Nelson, Henry Chen, Christy Alltop
December 8, 2022; 12:30 p.m. CST	(23–25, 16–25, 17–25); Report			KFC Yum! Center, Louisville, Kentucky; Attendance: 5,002; Referees: Ryan MacDowell, Daphne Nelson, Henry Chen, Christy Alltop

===== Regional finals =====
December 10, 2022; 3:00 p.m. CST	(3) Oregon	2–3	(1) Louisville	KFC Yum! Center, Louisville, Kentucky; Attendance: 8,749; Referees: Ryan MacDowell, Wade DuBois, Henry Chen, Kyp Harasymowycz
December 10, 2022; 3:00 p.m. CST	(23–25, 25–23, 25–13, 25–27, 6–15); Report			KFC Yum! Center, Louisville, Kentucky; Attendance: 8,749; Referees: Ryan MacDowell, Wade DuBois, Henry Chen, Kyp Harasymowycz

==== Region all-tournament team ====
The following players were named to the Louisville regional all-tournament team:

- Anna DeBeer (Louisville) – Most Outstanding Player
- Aiko Jones (Louisville)
- Claire Chaussee (Louisville)
- Mimi Colyer (Oregon)
- Brooke Nuneviller (Oregon)
- Morgan Lewis (Oregon)
- Ally Batenhorst (Nebraska)

== Final Four ==
National Semifinals; CHI Health Center Omaha; December 15
1	Texas	3
2	San Diego	1
2	Pittsburgh	2
1	Louisville	3

National Championship; CHI Health Center Omaha; December 17
1	Texas	3
1	Louisville	0

=== National Semifinals ===
December 15, 2022; 6:00 p.m. CST	(1) Texas	3–1	(2) San Diego	CHI Health Center Omaha, Omaha, Nebraska; Attendance: 16,735; Referees: Michelle Prater, Joe Gustafson, Bev Rea, Henry Chen
December 15, 2022; 6:00 p.m. CST	(26–28, 25–16, 25–18, 25–20); Report			CHI Health Center Omaha, Omaha, Nebraska; Attendance: 16,735; Referees: Michelle Prater, Joe Gustafson, Bev Rea, Henry Chen

December 15, 2022; 8:30 p.m. CST	(2) Pittsburgh	2–3	(1) Louisville	CHI Health Center Omaha, Omaha, Nebraska; Attendance: 16,735; Referees: Pati Rolf, Paula Martin, Dan Swensen, Rachel Jensen
December 15, 2022; 8:30 p.m. CST	(18–25, 25–23, 22–25, 25–22, 2–15); Report			CHI Health Center Omaha, Omaha, Nebraska; Attendance: 16,735; Referees: Pati Rolf, Paula Martin, Dan Swensen, Rachel Jensen

==== Game Recap ====
Texas defeated San Diego in the first semifinal match. San Diego was making its first final four appearance in school history and Texas was making its 14th final four. San Diego won the opening set in extra points, 28–26, before Texas came back to win the next three with scores of 25–16, 25–18, 25–20. Texas was led by junior outside hitter Madisen Skinner who had 17 kills on .394 hitting percentage and 2022 AVCA Player of the Year Logan Eggleston finished with 16 kills, nine digs, a team-high five blocks and one service ace. Texas was held to their second-lowest hitting percentage of the season at .248 but out–blocked San Diego 12–9 and held the Toreros to their worst hitting night of the season at .112.

In the second semifinal, Louisville defeated Pittsburgh 3–2. The teams, who are both in the ACC conference, handed each other its only conference loss of the season, as they both went 17–1 in conference play to claim a share of the title. Both teams were making their second straight (and second overall in school history) NCAA final four appearance. After going back-and-forth in the first four sets, Louisville won the fifth set with a runaway score of 15–2 to advance to its first national title match in school history, and became the first ACC team to advance to a championship match. In the match, three Louisville players had season-best performances: libero Elena Scott finished with a career-high 28 digs, middle blocker Phekran Kong set a career record with 11 blocks, including four in the fifth set, and outside hitter Anna DeBeer had a career best five service aces. Louisville was led by Claire Chaussee with 25 kills, including four in the fifth set, hitting .429 and added three kills and three blocks. Pittsburgh was led by Courtney Buzzerio with 13 kills and Serena Gray with 10 kills.

=== National Championship ===
December 17, 2022; 7:00 p.m. CST	(1) Texas	3–0	(1) Louisville	CHI Health Center Omaha, Omaha, Nebraska; Attendance: 16,592; Referees: Michelle Prater, Paula Martin, Bev Rea, Dan Swensen
December 17, 2022; 7:00 p.m. CST	(25–22, 25–14, 26–24); Report			CHI Health Center Omaha, Omaha, Nebraska; Attendance: 16,592; Referees: Michelle Prater, Paula Martin, Bev Rea, Dan Swensen

==== Game Recap ====
Texas won its third NCAA (and fourth overall) national championship after defeating Louisville in three sets. Texas became the first overall number one seed to win the championship since Stanford in 2018. Texas was ranked number 1 for most of the 2022 season and was led by six All-Americans.

Texas won the close first set 25–22. Louisville jumped out to an early lead but most of the set was led by Texas, who led 18–17, before going on a 3–1 run to go up 21–18, eventually winning on a kill by Eggleston. Texas hit .533 in the first set to Louisville's .400. Texas dominated the second set, going up 15–7 and eventually winning 25–14. What would be the third and final set, Louisville led 15–14 lead going into the media timeout, before Texas went on a 6–1 run to go up 20–16. Louisville tied the set at 21 all on a block and went up 24–22 on back to back kills. Despite having two set point chances to force a fourth set, Louisville could not close the set as Texas won the championship on a service ace, 26–24. In the match, Texas hit .371 as a team, with nine blocks and five service aces, while holding Louisville to just a .189 hitting percentage.

=== Final Four All-Tournament Team ===
The following players were named to the Final Four All-Tournament Team:

- Logan Eggleston (Texas) – Most Outstanding Player
- Saige Ka'aha'aina-Torres (Texas)
- Asjia O'Neal (Texas)
- Madisen Skinner (Texas)
- Claire Chaussee (Louisville)
- Anna DeBeer (Louisville)
- Aiko Jones (Louisville)

== Media coverage ==
For the third consecutive season all matches aired on the ESPN Family of networks. Rounds 1 and 2 streamed on ESPN+ with the exception of Texas matches, which were televised by LHN. All Sweet 16 and Elite 8 matches will air on ESPNU. ESPN will air the national semifinals while ESPN2 will air the national championship.

=== Rounds 1 & 2 ===
- Austin: Alex Loeb and Nicole Branagh
- Columbus: Tyler Danburg, Hanna Williford (Fri), and Zachary Rodier (Sat)
- Eugene: Knight Jarecki and Ryan Milano
- Gainesville: Tom Collett, Josh Crow (Fri), and Missy Whittemore (Sat)
- Lincoln: Larry Punteney and Kathi Wieskamp
- Louisville: Jeff Milby and Stephanie Cantway
- Lexington: Jeff Greer and Leah Edmond
- Madison: Aiden Michaels, Rachel Cohen (Fri), and Matt Blaustein (Sat)
- Milwaukee: Bob Brainerd and Michelle Griffin-Wenzel
- Minneapolis: Connor O'Neal, Meredith Nelson-Uram, and Emma Carpenter
- Omaha: Jake Eisenberg, Shannon Smolinski, and Anna Bellinghausen
- Pittsburgh: Jeff Hathhorn and Amanda Silay
- University Park: Preston Shoemaker (Fri), Matt Scalzo, and Thomas English (Sat)
- Waco: Pete Sousa, Katie Smith (Thurs), and Adam Johnson (Fri)
- San Diego: Braden Surprenant
- Stanford: Ben Ross and Jordan Watkins (Fri), Troy Clardy and Tim Swartz (Sat)

=== Regional semifinals & Regional Finals ===
- Austin: Holly McPeak and Courtney Lyle
- Louisville: Eric Frede and Katie George
- Madison: Sam Gore and Shelby Coppedge
- Stanford: Paul Sunderland and Missy Whittemore

=== Semifinals & National Championship ===
- Holly McPeak, Courtney Lyle, and Katie George

== Records by Conference ==
Conference	Bids	Record	Win %	R32	S16	E8	F4	CM	NC
Big 12	5	11–4	.733	5	2	1	1	1	1
ACC	5	10–5	.667	3	2	2	2	1	–
West Coast	4	5–4	.556	2	1	1	1	–	–
Big Ten	6	13–6	.684	6	5	2	–	–	–
Pac-12	6	8–6	.571	4	2	2	–	–	–
SEC	7	8–7	.533	6	2	–	–	–	–
American	2	3–2	.600	2	1	–	–	–	–
Big East	2	2–2	.500	1	1	–	–	–	–
C-USA	2	2–2	.500	2	–	–	–	–	–
Missouri Valley	1	1–1	.500	1	–	–	–	–	–
20 Others	20	0–20	.000	–	–	–	–	–	–

- The R32, S16, E8, F4, CM, and NC columns indicate how many teams from each conference were in the Round of 32 (second round), Round of 16 (third round), quarterfinals (Elite Eight), semi-finals (Final Four), Championship Match, and National Champion, respectively.
- The following conferences failed to place a team into the round of 32: America East, Atlantic 10, Big Sky, Big South, Big West, Colonial, Horizon, Ivy, MAAC, MEAC, Mountain West, Northeast, Ohio Valley, Patriot, Southern, Southland, SWAC, Summit, Sun Belt, and the WAC. The conference's records have been consolidated in the other row.
