= Laura Davis (volleyball) =

American volleyball player (born 1973)

Personal information
- Nationality: American
- Born: November 26, 1973 (age 52)
- Height: 5 ft 8 in (173 cm)
- Spike: 113 in (286 cm)
- Block: 111 in (282 cm)

Volleyball information
- Number: 2 (national team)

National team
| 1998 | United States |

Laura Davis (born November 26, 1973) is a retired American female volleyball player. She was part of the United States women's national volleyball team at the 1998 FIVB Volleyball Women's World Championship in Japan. In 1995, she won the Honda-Broderick Award (now the Honda Sports Award) as the nation's best female collegiate volleyball player.
