= Illinois Fighting Illini women's volleyball =

Women's volleyball team of the University of Illinois

- Founded: 1974
- University: University of Illinois at Urbana–Champaign
- Head coach: Chris Tamas (10th season)
- Conference: Big Ten
- Location: Champaign, Illinois, US
- Home arena: Huff Hall (capacity: 4,050)
- Nickname: Fighting Illini
- Colors: Orange and blue

AIAW/NCAA tournament runner-up
- 2011

AIAW/NCAA tournament semifinal
- 1987, 1988, 2011, 2018

AIAW/NCAA Regional Final
- 1986, 1987, 1988, 1989, 1992, 2011, 2018

AIAW/NCAA regional semifinal
- 1985, 1986, 1987, 1988, 1989, 1992, 1995, 1998, 2003, 2008, 2009, 2010, 2011, 2013, 2014, 2015, 2017, 2018, 2021

AIAW/NCAA tournament appearance
- 1977, 1980, 1985, 1986, 1987, 1888, 1989 1990, 1991, 1992, 1993, 1994, 1995, 1998, 1999, 2001, 2003, 2004, 2008, 2009, 2010, 2011, 2013, 2014, 2015, 2017, 2018, 2019, 2021, 2024

Conference regular season champion
- 1986, 1987, 1988, 1992

The Illinois Fighting Illini women's volleyball is the NCAA Division I intercollegiate volleyball program for the University of Illinois at Urbana–Champaign, often referred to as just "Illinois", located in Champaign, Illinois. The Illinois volleyball team competes in the Big Ten Conference and they have played their home matches from Huff Hall since 1990. Since moving into Huff Hall from the Kenney Gym, Illinois Volleyball has remained in the top 10 in the nation for average home attendance. In 2013, the program broke its previous home attendance record, averaging 3,117 per match.

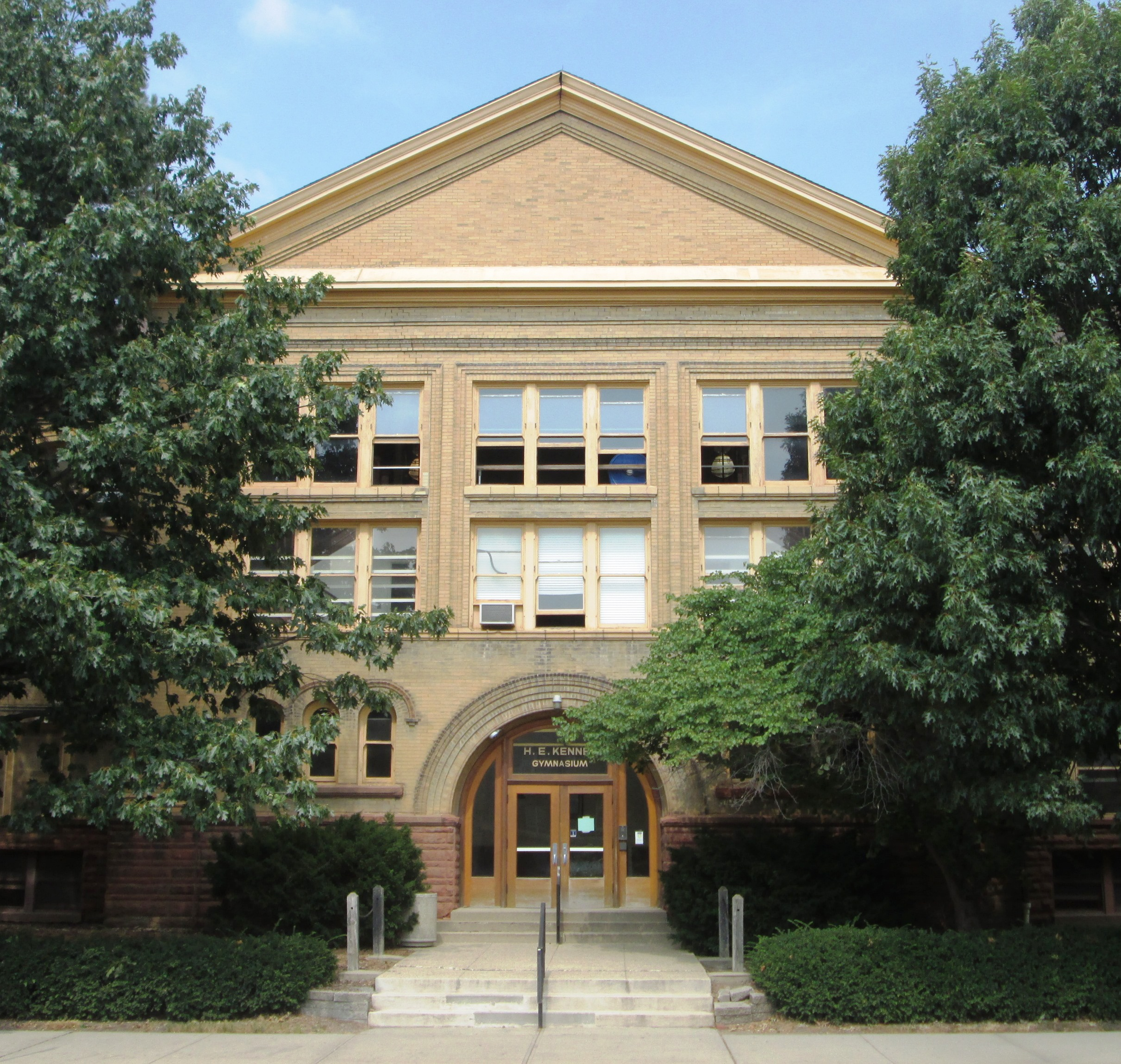
Kenney Gym served as the initial home court from 1974 through the 1989 season

== History ==
Since the founding of the volleyball program in 1974, the Fighting Illini have had 39 winning seasons.

=== Head coaching history ===
Illinois head coaches
Coach	Years	Record	Conference; Record	Conference; Titles	AIAW/NCAA; Appearances
Kathleen Haywood	1974	19–9	*		
Terry Hite	1975–1976	40–28	*		
Chris Accornero	1977–1979	84–51–7	*		1
John Blair	1980–1983	56–79	8–5*		1
Mike Hebert	1984–1995	323–127	173–62	4	11
Don Hardin	1996–2008	234–163	127–133		6
Kevin Hambly	2009–2016	140–59	82–38		6
Chris Tamas	2017–	149–94	90–68		5
Totals		1083–637–7	491–321	4	30

- Big Ten Conference volleyball did not begin play until 1982.

=== Attendance records ===
Top attendance figures.
Rank	Attendance	Opponent	Home venue	Date
1	7,632	Minnesota	State Farm Center	October 16, 2009
2	7,061	Iowa	State Farm Center	September 27, 2013
3	4,631	Purdue	State Farm Center	December 13, 2013
4	4,536	Wisconsin	Huff Hall	October 4, 2014
5	4,316	Stanford	Huff Hall	December 11, 1992
6	4,261	Purdue	Huff Hall	October 1, 2011
7	4,211	Ohio State	Huff Hall	December 3, 1992
T-8	4,152	Purdue	Huff Hall	November 24, 2018
T-8	4,152	Penn State	Huff Hall	November 10, 2018
T-8	4,152	Wisconsin	Huff Hall	December 8, 2018

== Season results ==
Year	Head coach	Overall record	Conference record	Conference standing	Postseason
1974	Kathleen Haywood	19–9			–
1975	Terri Hite	15–14			–
1976	Terri Hite	25–14			–
1977	Chris Accornero	38–17–6			AIAW National Tournament Appearance
1978	Chris Accornero	28–14–1			–
1979	Chris Accornero	18–20			–
1980	John Blair	22–32			AIAW National Tournament Appearance
1981	John Blair	17–27			–
1982	John Blair	17–20			–
(Big Ten) (1983–present)
1983	Mike Hebert	5–25	2–11	5th (west)	–
1984	Mike Hebert	18–15	6–7	3rd (west)	–
1985	Mike Hebert	39–3	16–2	2nd	NCAA Sweet Sixteen
1986	Mike Hebert	36–3	18–0	1st	NCAA Elite Eight
1987	Mike Hebert	31–7	17–1	1st	NCAA Final Four
1988	Mike Hebert	30–4	18–0	1st	NCAA Final Four
1989	Mike Hebert	27–8	13–5	2nd	NCAA Elite Eight
1990	Mike Hebert	21–12	11–7	4th	NCAA First Round
1991	Mike Hebert	19–10	14–6	4th	NCAA First Round
1992	Mike Hebert	32–4	19–1	1st	NCAA Elite Eight
1993	Mike Hebert	18–13	14–6	3rd	NCAA Second Round
1994	Mike Hebert	23–14	12–8	4th	NCAA First Round
1995	Mike Hebert	24–9	12–8	4th	NCAA Sweet Sixteen
1996	Don Hardin	13–15	8–12	7th	–
1997	Don Hardin	17–13	8–12	7th	–
1998	Don Hardin	22–11	13–7	4th	NCAA Sweet Sixteen
1999	Don Hardin	17–11	12–8	4th	NCAA Second Round
2000	Don Hardin	13–18 (15–16)	4–16 (6–14)	10th	–
2001	Don Hardin	21–9	13–7	4th	NCAA Second Round
2002	Don Hardin	13–16	7–13	9th	–
2003	Don Hardin	26–7	15–5	2nd	NCAA Sweet Sixteen
2004	Don Hardin	19–11	11–9	5th	NCAA First Round
2005	Don Hardin	16–15	7–13	7th	–
2006	Don Hardin	15–15	6–14	9th	–
2007	Don Hardin	16–14	8–12	8th	–
2008	Don Hardin	26–8	15–5	3rd	NCAA Sweet Sixteen
2009	Kevin Hambly	26–6	16–4	2nd	NCAA Sweet Sixteen
2010	Kevin Hambly	24–9	14–6	2nd	NCAA Sweet Sixteen
2011	Kevin Hambly	32–5	16–4	2nd	NCAA Runner-up
2012	Kevin Hambly	14–16	8–12	8th	–
2013	Kevin Hambly	18–15	12–8	4th	NCAA Sweet Sixteen
2014	Kevin Hambly	26–8	16–4	3rd	NCAA Sweet Sixteen
2015	Kevin Hambly	21–13	10–10	7th	NCAA Sweet Sixteen
2016	Kevin Hambly	17–14	10–10	8th	–
2017	Chris Tamas	23–11	12–8	6th	NCAA Sweet Sixteen
2018	Chris Tamas	32–4	17–3	2nd	NCAA Final Four
2019	Chris Tamas	16-14	11-9	7th	NCAA First Round
2020-21	Chris Tamas	7-11	7-11	7th	-
2021	Chris Tamas	22-12	12-8	7th	NCAA Sweet Sixteen
2022	Chris Tamas	15-15	10-10	7th	-
2023	Chris Tamas	16-14	11-9	T6th	-
2024	Chris Tamas	18-13	10-10	8th	NCAA First Round
Totals		1083–637–7	491–321		30 postseason appearances

== See also ==
- List of NCAA Division I women's volleyball programs
