= Maryland Terrapins women's volleyball =

American college volleyball team

- Founded: 1983
- Head coach: Adam Hughes (9th season)
- Location: College Park, Maryland
- Home arena: Xfinity Center Pavilion (capacity: 2,500)
- Nickname: Terps
- Colors: Red, white, black, and gold

AIAW/NCAA tournament appearance
- 1990, 1995, 1996, 1997, 2003, 2004, 2005

Conference regular season champion
- 1990, 1996, 2003, 2004, 2005

The Maryland Terrapins women's volleyball team is currently coached by Adam Hughes, who began in 2018.

== Year by year highlights ==
=== 1987–2008 ===
Maryland volleyball began in 1983. After a few years, the program was led by future great Janice Kruger. Kruger led the Terps to back-to-back ACC titles in 2004 and 2005, as well as upsets over the following teams: on 10/16/93, #17 Florida State, 9/29/95 #22 Georgia Tech, 10/4/96 #22 Georgia Tech, 8/30/97 #14 Ohio State, 10/21/01 #25 North Carolina, 11/1/03 #4 Georgia Tech, 11/23/03 #6 Georgia Tech. Maryland volleyball head coach Janice Kruger's career accomplishments have reached an apex in recent years: five ACC titles, seven trips to the NCAA Tournament, five ACC and AVCA Region Coach of the Year honors and the top spot among all-time winningest coaches in ACC Volleyball history.

Kruger boasts an impressive .652 overall winning percentage since the 2003 season. After winning the ACC Championship in 2004 with an 18–15 season record, the Terps improved to 28–5 in 2005 to win their third-consecutive ACC Championship and advanced to the second round of the NCAA Tournament for the third straight year. Maryland eased past Kentucky in the first round of the 2005 NCAA's, before dropping a close contest to Louisville.

The AVCA named Kruger the East Region Coach of the Year in 2005, marking the fifth time she won the award. In 2003, Kruger was named the Atlantic Coast Conference Coach of the Year after leading Maryland to the ACC Championship. Kruger became the ACC's all-time winningest coach that year and now, heading into the 2007 season, ranks first in conference history with 363 victories at Maryland.

With 738 career victories, Kruger has built a powerful program in College Park that includes ACC titles in 1990, 1996, 2003, 2004, 2005 and trips to the NCAA Tournament in 1990, 1995, 1996, 1997, 2003, 2004 and 2005. Kruger's success has not gone without notice, as she has been named both the ACC and AVCA District/Region Coach of the Year in 1990, 1996, 1997, 2003 and 2005. During her coaching career, Kruger has amassed a stellar 363–235 record in College Park.

=== 2008–2013 ===
Over his four seasons at Maryland, Tim Horsmon continually recruited top talent to College Park with two players, Mary Cushman (2010) and Adreene Elliott (2011), earning ACC-All Freshman honors. In addition, Horsmon's last four recruiting classes all received Highest Honorable Mention honors from PrepVolleyball.com. In 2010, the Terps narrowly missed out on their first trip to the NCAA tournament in five years. That season the squad finished with 19 victories including two top-25 wins over Duke and Florida State, respectively. Horsmon's tenure at Maryland was marked with continual staff turnover and sub-par performance which ultimately led to his dismissal from the program.

=== 2014–2017 ===
In his first season with the Terps, Steve Aird led Maryland to a 6–0 start, the program's best since 2005. As he helped guide his team through the Terps’ most difficult schedule, and their first in the Big Ten, Aird also increased support and interest through the community. In 2014, Maryland averaged 1,539 fans per match in College Park, a dramatic increase from the 336 average the season before. In Aird's first season, the Terps set four of the top-10 attendance records in Maryland history, including the No. 1 attendance record (4,522 vs. Penn State, Oct. 23).

Under Aird's direction, Maryland earned its first-ever Big Ten win in a nationally televised match over Rutgers on the Big Ten Network. The Terps showed continual improvement throughout the season as the team took set wins over No. 15 Purdue, No. 18 Ohio State and No. 11 Nebraska.

=== 2018–Present ===
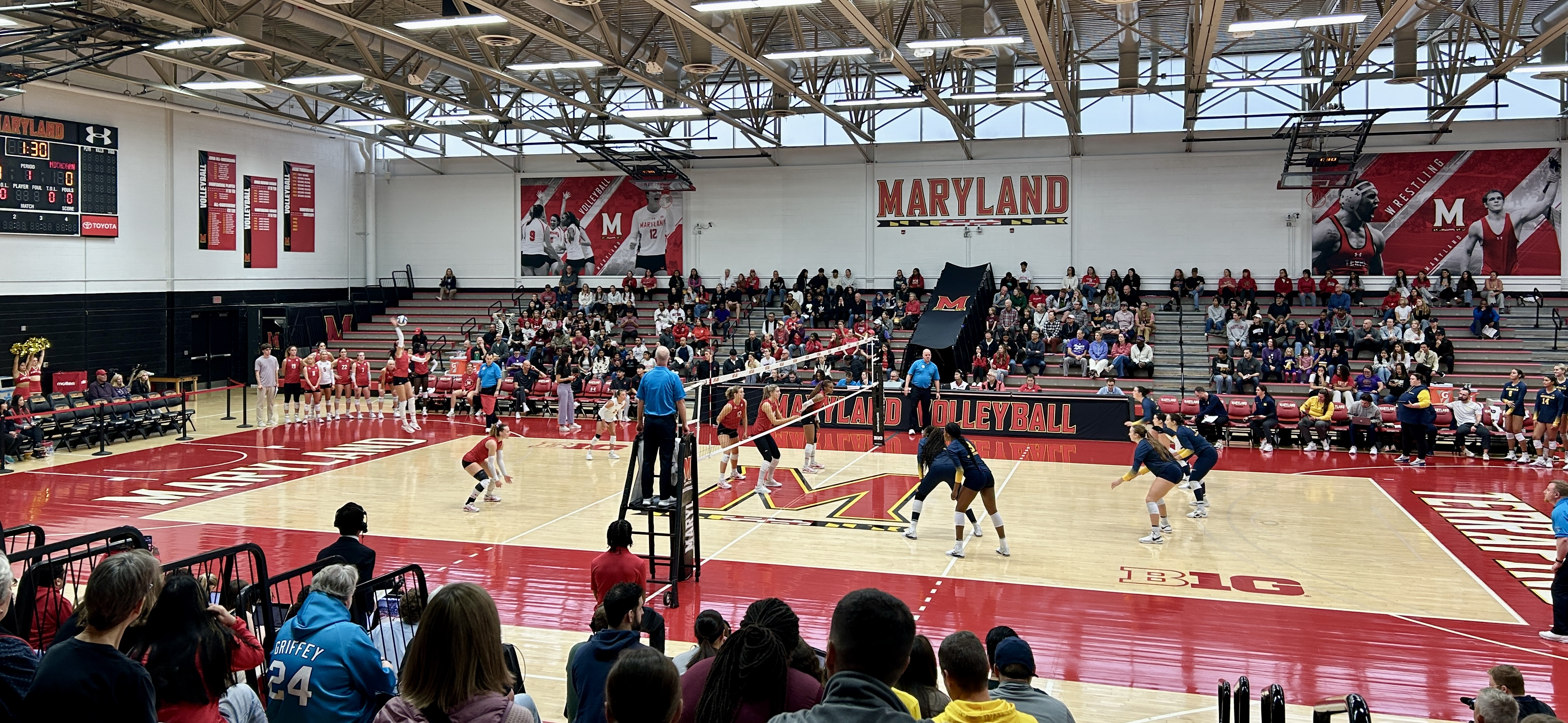
The Maryland Terrapins women’s volleyball teams playing at the Xfinity Center in 2025

On January 23, 2018, Adam Hughes was named the fifth head coach of Maryland Volleyball.

== Historical Statistics ==
Overall
Years of Volleyball	35
1st Season	1983
Head Coaches	6
All-Time Record	644–133–3
ACC games
ACC W-L record (Prior to 2015)	56–19
ACC Titles	5
ACC Tournament Titles	0
Big Ten games
Big Ten W-L record (Since 2015)	6–28
Big Ten Titles	0
NCAA Tournament
NCAA Appearances	5
NCAA W-L record	2–4
Final Fours	0
National Championships	0

*Statistics through 2015 season

== Seasons ==
Record table
Season	Coach	Overall	Conference	Standing	Postseason
Barb Drum (Independent) (1971–1979)
1971–72	Barb Drum	18–5			AIAW
1972–73	Barb Drum	18–8			
1973–74	Barb Drum	25–2			
1974–75	Barb Drum	39–4			AIAW
1975–76	Barb Drum	46–6			AIAW
1976–77	Barb Drum	30–16			AIAW
1977–78	Barb Drum	43–15			AIAW
1978–79	Barb Drum	37–13			
1979–80	Barb Drum	29–15			
Barb Drum (Atlantic Coast Conference) (1980–1987)
1980–81	Barb Drum	23–20			
1981–82	Barb Drum	32–19		6th	
1982–83	Barb Drum	23–20	2–4	5th	
1983–84	Barb Drum	21–17	5–2	4th	
1984–85	Barb Drum	24–17	4–3	4th	
1985–86	Barb Drum	18–14	4–3	4th	
1986–87	Barb Drum	21–17	4–3	4th	
1987–88	Barb Drum	10–18	1–5	6th	
Janice Kruger (Atlantic Coast Conference) (1988–2007)
1988–89	Janice Kruger	11–22	4–3	3rd	
1989–90	Janice Kruger	23–15	2–4	3rd	
1990–91	Janice Kruger	22–12	5–1	1st	NCAA First Round
1991–92	Janice Kruger	18–11	5–2	2nd	
1992–93	Janice Kruger	24–9	5–2	3rd	
1993–94	Janice Kruger	16–12	6–8	5th	
1994–95	Janice Kruger	18–13	8–6	4th	
1995–96	Janice Kruger	22–10	10–4	3rd	NCAA Second Round
1996–97	Janice Kruger	26–5	16–0	1st	NCAA Second Round
1997–98	Janice Kruger	27–2	16–0	1st	NCAA Second Round
1998–99	Janice Kruger	13–16	5–11	7th	
1999–2000	Janice Kruger	12–19	5–11	8th	
2000–01	Janice Kruger	14–16	4–12	8th	
2001–02	Janice Kruger	12–14	7–9	6th	
2002–03	Janice Kruger	18–14	7–9	6th	
2003–04	Janice Kruger	27–8	12–4	2nd	NCAA Second Round
2004–05	Janice Kruger	18–15	7–9	T–7th	
2005–06	Janice Kruger	28–5	18–4	T–1st	
2006–07	Janice Kruger	13–18	6–16	11th	
2007–08	Janice Kruger	18–13	10–12	7th	
Tim Horsmon (Atlantic Coast Conference) (2008–2013)
2008–09	Tim Horsmon	6–26	2–18	11th	
2009–10	Tim Horsmon	14–19	6–14	10th	
2010–11	Tim Horsmon	19–13	10–10	T–7th	
2011–12	Tim Horsmon	10–22	4–16	11th	
2012–13	Tim Horsmon	17–15	8–12	8th	
2013–14	Tim Horsmon	13–19	5–15	13th	
Steve Aird (Big Ten Conference) (2014–2017)
2014–15	Steve Aird	10–21	3–17	13th	
2015–16	Steve Aird	15–19	5–15	12th	
2016–17	Steve Aird	12–20	4–16	12th	
2017–18	Steve Aird	18–14	7–13	10th	
Adam Hughes (Big Ten Conference) (2018–present)
2018–19	Adam Hughes	18–14	9–11	8th	
2019–20	Adam Hughes	13–19	5–15	T–10th	
2020–21	Adam Hughes	5–15	5–15	11th	
2021–22	Adam Hughes	19–13	7–13	9th	
2022-23	Adam Hughes	16-16	7-13	10th	
2023-24	Adam Hughes	17-15	7-13	11th	
2024-25	Adam Hughes	14-17	5-15	15th	
2025-26	Adam Hughes	8-22	1-19	18th	
Total:		1084-794 (.577)			
National champion Postseason invitational champion Conference regular season champion Conference regular season and conference tournament champion Division regular season champion Division regular season and conference tournament champion Conference tournament champion

== See also ==
- List of NCAA Division I women's volleyball programs
