= Mike Hebert =

American volleyball coach (1944–2019)

Personal information
- Full name: Michael Robert Hebert
- Born: January 7, 1944; Long Beach, California, U.S.
- Died: October 21, 2019 (aged 75); San Diego, California, U.S.
- Hometown: Long Beach, California U.S.
- Education: University of California, Santa Barbara; Indiana University

Coaching information
Previous teams coached
Years	Teams
1976–1979; 1980–1982; 1983–1995; 1996–2010	Pittsburgh men's/women's head coach New Mexico women's head coach Illinois women's head coach Minnesota women's head coach

Best results
Years
1978
1979
1986
1987
1988
1992
2002
2003
2004
2009
Location
EAIAW Regional Championship
EAIAW Regional Championship
Big Ten Championship
NCAA National Championship
Big Ten Championship
NCAA National Championship
Big Ten Championship
Big Ten Championship
Big Ten Championship
NCAA National Championship
NCAA National Championship
NCAA National Championship
Result
1st
1st
1st
3rd
1st
3rd
1st
1st
1st
3rd
2nd
4th
- Last updated: December 19, 2010

Michael Robert Hebert (January 7, 1944 – October 21, 2019) was an American volleyball coach. He is considered to be one of the "architects" of modern high-competitive professional volleyball. Hebert coached the Pittsburgh (1976–1979) men and women teams, New Mexico (1980–1982) women's team, Illinois (1983–1995) women's team, and Minnesota (1996–2010) women's team before announcing his retirement at the conclusion of the 2010 season.

== Early life ==
Hebert was a native of Long Beach, California, and attended college at the University of California, Santa Barbara, where he also played on the indoor volleyball squad.

In the mid 1970s, after being in the Peace Corps in Nigeria, he returned to the United States and received his PhD in Philosophy of Education at Indiana University Bloomington.

In 1975 he received a call to be the head coach of Women's varsity volleyball at the University of Pittsburgh, but he declined because he felt his only knowledge of the sport of volleyball was limited to men's volleyball. The university called back a month later and asked him to reconsider, when he accepted the job offer for $1,500. The position led to a full-time faculty position as the team went on to win division titles upon Hebert's first season.

== Head coaching history ==
=== 1976–1979: Pittsburgh ===
Hebert began his coaching career at the University of Pittsburgh, where he compiled a 128–53 mark with the women’s team and a 60–21 record as the men’s coach. He led the women's team to two EAIAW championships and two appearances in the AIAW National Championships. During his tenure, he won the EAIAW Eastern Region Coach of the Year award in 1978 and 1979.

=== 1980–1982: New Mexico ===
Hebert coached the women’s team at New Mexico, notching a 60–57 record and advancing to the NCAA regionals in 1981 with a 26–17 record.

=== 1983–1995 Illinois ===
At University of Illinois at Urbana–Champaign, Hebert led the Fighting Illini to two NCAA Final Four appearances (1987 & 1988) and four Big Ten titles. During the 1988 season, Illinois became the first volleyball team east of the Mississippi River to be rated No. 1 in the nation.

Hebert coached Mary Eggers from 1985–1988, who was the Big Ten Player of the Year for three consecutive years, as well as Nancy Brookhart, who shared the honor with Eggers in 1987. It remains the only time that a co-Big Ten Player of the Year was shared with two players on the same team.

In 1985, Hebert received the American Volleyball Coaches Association highest honor, as he was named the National Coach of the Year. From 1985 to 1988, Hebert was the president of the AVCA.

=== 1996–2011: Minnesota ===
At Minnesota, Hebert led the Gophers to one Big Ten title (2002), and three NCAA Final Four appearances in 2003, 2004 and 2009. He has coached two Big Ten Players of the Year, Nicole Branagh (2000) and Cassie Busse (2004). In 2004, Hebert led Minnesota to the program's first ever national championship match, finishing as national runners-up. Briefly in 2004, the Gophers were ranked #1 in the coaches poll, the first time in program history that Minnesota claimed the top spot.

In Hebert’s 15 years at Minnesota, the Gophers are 381–137, 211–89 in the Big Ten and have participated in 11 NCAA Tournaments.

Hebert has produced two Olympians, Lindsey Berg, who made Olympic appearances in 2004 and 2008 for the indoor team, and Nicole Branagh, who appeared in the 2008 Olympics with Elaine Youngs for beach volleyball.

In 2006, Hebert was inducted into the AVCA Hall of Fame.

== International coaching ==
In the summer of 2003, Hebert coached the U.S. National Team to a bronze medal at the Pan American Games.

Hebert served as head coach of the U.S. women’s team competing at the 1991 World University Games in Sheffield, England. The USA women’s team also competed in the 1991 Pan American Games in Havana, Cuba. Hebert traveled to the 1989 Canada Cup and 1990 Cuba Cup as part of a series of assignments with the U.S. National Team.

== Personal ==
Hebert received his Bachelor's degree in Sociology from the University of California, Santa Barbara in 1966, and his Ph.D. in Philosophy of Education from the University of Indiana in 1974. He is the author of two books, including a 1993 co-written autobiography (with Dave Johnson) titled The Fire Still Burns.

Hebert died on October 21, 2019, at the age of 75 and is survived by his wife, Sherry, two daughters; Becky and Hillary, and three grandchildren; Mateo, Farris and Aliya.

== Head coaching record ==
Statistics overview
Season	Team	Overall	Conference	Standing	Postseason
Illinois Fighting Illini (Big Ten Conference) (1983–1995)
1983	Illinois	5–25	2–11		
1984	Illinois	18–15	6–7		
1985	Illinois	39–3	16–2		NCAA Tournament T-9th
1986	Illinois	36–3	18–0		NCAA Tournament T-9th
1987	Illinois	31–7	17–1		NCAA Tournament T-3rd
1988	Illinois	30–4	18–0		NCAA Tournament T-3rd
1989	Illinois	27–8	13–5		NCAA Tournament T-9th
1990	Illinois	21–12	11–7		NCAA Tournament T-17th
1991	Illinois	19–10	14–6		NCAA Tournament T-17th
1992	Illinois	32–4	19–1		NCAA Tournament T-5th
1993	Illinois	18–13	14–6		NCAA Tournament T-17th
1994	Illinois	23–14	12–8		NCAA Tournament T-33rd
1995	Illinois	24–9	12–8		NCAA Tournament T-9th
Totals		291–133	144–62		
Minnesota Golden Gophers (Big Ten Conference) (1996–2010)
1996–97	Minnesota	24–11	14–6	4th	NCAA Second Round
1997–98	Minnesota	23–10	12–8	T–5th	NCAA Second Round
1998–99	Minnesota	17–14	7–13	8th	
1999–2000	Minnesota	27–9	15–5	2nd	NCAA Regional Semifinals
2000–01	Minnesota	30–4	17–3	2nd	NCAA Regional Semifinals
2001–02	Minnesota	19–13	10–10	T–6th	NCAA Regional Semifinals
2002–03	Minnesota	32–6	17–3	1st	NCAA Regional Semifinals
2003–04	Minnesota	26–11	15–5	T–2nd	NCAA Final Four
2004–05	Minnesota	33–5	17–3	T–2nd	NCAA Runner-Up
2005–06	Minnesota	25–8	14–6	T–3rd	NCAA Second Round
2006–07	Minnesota	26–8	17–3	2nd	NCAA Regional Final
2007–08	Minnesota	18–13	11–9	T–3rd	NCAA First Round
2008–09	Minnesota	27–7	16–4	2nd	NCAA Second Round
2009–10	Minnesota	28–9	14–6	3rd	NCAA National Semifinal
2010–11	Minnesota	26–9	14–6	2nd	NCAA Regional Semifinal
Totals		381–137	173–76		

== Awards and honors ==
- 2006 – AVCA Hall of Fame induction
- 2003 – Volleyball Magazine National Coach of the Year
- 2002 – AVCA Mideast Region Coach of the Year, Big Ten Coach of the Year
- 1999 – AVCA District II Coach of the Year, Big Ten Coach of the Year (Minn.)
- 1988 – Big Ten Coach of the Year (Ill.)
- 1986 – Big Ten Coach of the Year (Ill.)
- 1985 – AVCA National Coach of the Year (Ill.)
- 1980 – Intermountain Conference Coach of the Year (New Mex.)
- 1979 – EAIAW Eastern Region Coach of the Year (Pitt)
- 1978 – EAIAW Eastern Region Coach of the Year (Pitt)

== See also ==
- List of college women's volleyball coaches with 700 wins
