= Tuiasosopo =

Tuiasosopo is a Samoan surname.

- Tuiasosopo Mariota, a tribal leader who helped keep American Samoa from being incorporated into the United States
- Mariota Tiumalu Tuiasosopo (1905–1957), American Samoan songwriter

As of early 2014, its most notable bearers all belong to the same family:

- Manu Tuiasosopo (born 1957), American NFL football player
- Peter "Navy" Tuiasosopo (1963–2025), American Samoan actor and football player, cousin of Manu
- Mike Tuiasosopo, American football coach, cousin of Manu and brother of Navy
- Marques Tuiasosopo (born 1979), American football quarterback and coach, son of Manu
- Leslie Tuiasosopo (born circa 1977), American volleyball coach, daughter of Manu
- Zach Tuiasosopo, American football player, son of Manu
- Matt Tuiasosopo (born 1986), American baseball player, son of Manu
- Lanea Tuiasosopo, American rower, daughter of Mike
- Ronaiah Tuiasosopo, perpetrator of the Manti Te'o girlfriend hoax, nephew of Manu
