= John C. Elliott =

American politician

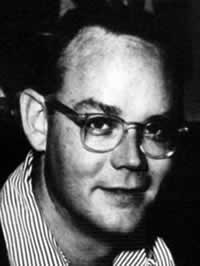

Governor of American Samoa
- In office July 16, 1952 – November 23, 1952
- Preceded by: Phelps Phelps
- Succeeded by: James Arthur Ewing

Secretary of American Samoa
- In office February 23, 1951 – June 20, 1952
- Governor: Phelps Phelps

Personal details
- Born: January 30, 1919 Los Angeles, California
- Died: August 13, 2001 (aged 82) San Marino, California
- Resting place: San Gabriel Cemetery, San Gabriel, California
- Party: Democratic

John C. Elliott (January 30, 1919 – April 13, 2001) was an American politician appointed as the governor of American Samoa. Elliott was born on January 30, 1919, in Los Angeles, California. He died on April 13, 2001, in San Marino, California. He is buried at the San Gabriel Cemetery in San Gabriel, California. He took office on July 16, 1952, and left on November 23, 1952, leaving for personal reasons, and is the youngest man to ever hold the office at 33 years of age. Prior to his appointment, Elliott had served as the assistant to Governor Phelps Phelps and Secretary of American Samoa.

Elliott was the second DOI-appointed Governor of American Samoa, having previously served as the Secretary of Samoan Affairs under Governor Phelps Phelps. He was popular among local leaders, with many, including Tuiasosopo and A. P. Lutali, sending petitions to Washington in his support. Elliott collaborated closely with Tuiasosopo to reorganize the three-year-old American Samoa Legislature. He replaced the upper house, Atoa o Ali'i, with the American Samoa Senate and reduced the membership of the American Samoa House of Representatives from 54 to 21. His sudden departure after just three months as Governor was attributed to personal reasons that were never revealed.

Government offices
Preceded by Phelps Phelps	Governor of American Samoa; 1952	Succeeded by James Arthur Ewing
