= Keegan Cook =

American volleyball coach (born 1985)

Current position
- Title: Head coach
- Team: Minnesota
- Conference: Big Ten
- Record: 79–43 (.648)
- Annual salary: $425,000.00

Biographical details
- Born: July 9, 1985 (age 41); Pleasanton, California, U.S.
- Education: Saint Mary's (CA)

Coaching career (HC unless noted)
- 2005–2012: Saint Mary's (assistant)
- 2013–2014: Washington (assistant)
- 2014–2015: Washington (beach)
- 2015–2022: Washington (indoor)
- 2023–present: Minnesota

Head coaching record
- Overall: 277–99 (.737)

Accomplishments and honors

Championships
- 4x Pac-12 (2015, 2016, 2020, 2021)

Awards
- AVCA Northwest Region Coach of the Year (2025); Pac-12 Coach of the Year (2020); 3x AVCA Pacific North Region Coach of the Year (2015, 2020, 2021)

Robert Keegan Cook (born July 9, 1985), known as Keegan Cook, is an American volleyball coach.

He began his coaching career at his alma mater, Saint Mary's, where he was on the staff in various assistant coaching roles for eight years (2005–2012). He served as an assistant coach for the University of Washington in 2013 and 2014 before assuming the head coaching role from 2015–2022.

On December 12, 2022, Cook was named the eighth head coach at the University of Minnesota, to begin in the 2023 season, succeeding former coach Hugh McCutcheon.

== Personal life ==
Cook is a native of Pleasanton, California. In 2007, he graduated from Saint Mary's with a Bachelor of Arts in mathematics with a minor in religious studies. He has done work for statistical analysis as a Volleyball Information Supervisor (VIS) for the FIVB. In January 2022, he was named as the president of the board of directors for the American Volleyball Coaches Association, a position he served through the end of 2023.

He is married to Sarah Ammerman, a former professional volleyball player he met while on a foreign tour in 2017, and they have a son, born in 2021.

== Coaching career ==
=== High school club ===
Cook was the head coach of the NorCal Volleyball Club for ten years. His teams qualified for the Junior Olympic Championships over his last five years and his 16-Under team won the 2008 Junior Olympic gold medal.

=== Saint Mary's (CA) ===
Cook began his collegiate coaching career while still a student at Saint Mary's, starting as a volunteer student assistant coach in 2005 and working his way up to the top assistant coach. Cook helped the team to its first West Coast Conference title in 2009 and advanced to the NCAA tournament three times, including a second round appearance in 2012.

=== Washington ===
Cook was an assistant coach at Washington in 2013 and 2014 under Jim McLaughlin before being named the head coach in 2015. In his eight seasons at Washington, he led the team to four Pac-12 conference titles and one final four appearance in 2020.

In addition to coaching indoor volleyball at Washington, he also was the head coach for the beach team in 2014 and 2015, going 8–0 during the first full season in 2015.

Under Cook, twelve players earned a combined 18 All-American Award and 37 all-Pac 12 selections, with 2 players earning a combined 3 Pac-12 Player of the Year honor. He was named the Pac-12 Coach of the Year in 2020 and the AVCA Pacific North Region Coach of the Year in 2015, 2020, and 2021.

=== Minnesota ===
On December 12, 2022, Cook was named the eighth head coach at Minnesota, succeeding Hugh McCutcheon who stepped down from the role at the conclusion of the 2022 season.

=== USA national teams ===
In addition to collegiate coaching, he has also worked with USA Volleyball. In 2016, he was the head coach for the U.S. Collegiate Women's National Team for its tour of China, and in the summer of 2018 Cook led the U.S. Junior Women's National Team to compete in the NORCECA Championships in Mexico. He was named the head coach for the U.S. Girl's Youth National Team at the NORCECA Continental Championships in 2020, before the event was cancelled due to the COVID-19 pandemic In the summer of 2022, he was an assistant coach for the U.S. Girl's U19 Team that won the gold medal at the Pan American Cup.

== Head coaching record ==
Record table
Season	Team	Overall	Conference	Standing	Postseason
Washington Huskies (Pac-12) (2015–2022)
2015	Washington	31–3	18–2	T–1st	NCAA regional final
2016	Washington	29–5	16–4	1st	NCAA regional final
2017	Washington	25–8	14–6	2nd	NCAA second round
2018	Washington	20–13	10–10	6th	NCAA regional semifinal
2019	Washington	27–7	15–5	2nd	NCAA regional final
2020	Washington	20–4	17–3	1st	NCAA final four
2021	Washington	26–5	17–3	1st	NCAA regional semifinal
2022	Washington	20–11	12–8	T–5th	NCAA first round
Washington:		198–56 (.780)	119–41 (.744)		
Minnesota Golden Gophers (Big Ten) (2023–present)
2023	Minnesota	17–13	12–8	5th	NCAA second round
2024	Minnesota	21–11	13–7	T–6th	NCAA second round
2025	Minnesota	24–10	12–8	T–6th	NCAA regional semifinal
2026	Minnesota	17–9	11–6	T–5th	TBD
Minnesota:		79–43 (.648)	48–29 (.623)		
Total:		277–99 (.737)			
National champion Postseason invitational champion Conference regular season champion Conference regular season and conference tournament champion Division regular season champion Division regular season and conference tournament champion Conference tournament champion
