= Joe Flynn =

Joseph or Joe Flynn may refer to:

- Joe Flynn (comics)
- Joe Flynn (American actor) (1924–1974), featured in the American sitcom McHale's Navy
- Johnny Flynn (born 1983), British actor, musician and singer-songwriter
- Joe Flynn (baseball) (1861–1933), 19th century baseball player
- Joseph C. H. Flynn (1892–1941), American lawyer, politician, and judge
- Joseph V. Flynn (1883–1940), U.S. representative from New York
- Joseph P. Flynn, Chief Judge of the Connecticut Appellate Court
- Joseph T. Flynn, American lawyer and politician from New York
