= Kansas State Wildcats women's volleyball =

American college volleyball team

Kansas State Wildcats
- University: Kansas State University
- Head coach: Jason Mansfield (1st season)
- Conference: Big 12
- Location: Manhattan, Kansas, US
- Home arena: Morgan Family Arena (capacity: 3,100)
- Nickname: Wildcats
- Colors: Royal purple and white

AIAW/NCAA regional semifinal
- 2000, 2003, 2011

AIAW/NCAA tournament appearance
- 1977, 1996, 1997, 1998, 1999, 2000, 2001, 2002, 2003, 2004, 2005, 2007, 2008, 2011, 2012, 2014, 2015, 2016, 2021, 2025

Conference regular season champion
- 2003

The Kansas State Wildcats volleyball program is the intercollegiate volleyball program of the Kansas State University Wildcats. The program is classified in the NCAA Division I, and the team competes in the Big 12 Conference. Kansas State's volleyball team began competition in 1974. Jason Mansfield has served as head coach since the start of the 2023 season.

== History ==
While the program was moderately successful through much of their early years, finishing with just over a .500 winning percentage in the 1970s, Kansas State Volleyball struggled throughout much of the 1980s and early 1990s, not making a single NCAA tournament appearance or finishing with an above .500 record in Big Eight play. From 1991 to 1993, the program only won one game in conference play (coming in 1991), finishing 0–12 both in 1992 and 1993.

The program direction started to change however, with the hiring of Jim Moore in 1994. While only modestly improving to 3–9 in Big Eight play in his first year, the Wildcats won 21 games in 1995, and finished 1996 with 26 wins, and tied for fourth in the newly minted Big 12 Conference. 1996 also marked the program's first ever berth into the NCAA women's volleyball tournament, where they defeated Cal State Northridge in the first round before losing to Washington State in the Second round. While Moore left the program before the 1997 season for Big 12 Rival University of Texas, his tenure marked a tremendous turnaround for the program.

Jim McLaughlin followed Jim Moore in the 1997 season, leading the program to four more consecutive NCAA Tournament berths during each year of his tenure, including their first ever NCAA Sweet Sixteen berth in the 2000 season. His time as head coach of the program marked a period of continued success for the Wildcats.

=== 2013 World University games ===
The Kansas State volleyball team served as the U.S. national squad at the 2013 Summer Universiade in Russia. The team posted a 1–5 record at the tournament.

=== Season results ===
Record table
Season record
Season	Team	Overall	Conference	Standing	Postseason
Ann Heider (Big Eight Conference) (1974–1974)
1974	Ann Heider	24–20–4			AIAW Region VI Tournament
Ann Heider:		24–20–4 (.542)			
Mary Dwight (Big Eight Conference) (1975–1978)
1975	Mary Dwight	2–36–1			
1976	Mary Dwight	18–21			
1977	Mary Dwight	49–18–1			AIAW Tournament
1978	Mary Dwight	39–16–1		3rd	AIAW Region VI Tournament
Mary Dwight:		108–91–4 (.542)			
Ron Spies (Big Eight Conference) (1979–1979)
1979	Ron Spies	35–16–3			AIAW Region VI Tournament
Ron Spies:		35–16–3 (.676)			
Scott Nelson (Big Eight Conference) (1980–1990)
1980	Scott Nelson	12–23			
1981	Scott Nelson	16–23–1			
1982	Scott Nelson	15–15	4–6	4th	
1983	Scott Nelson	19–15	2–8	5th	
1984	Scott Nelson	19–14	2–8	5th	
1985	Scott Nelson	21–11	5–5	3rd	
1986	Scott Nelson	12–17	2–8	6th	
1987	Scott Nelson	17–11	5–7	5th	
1988	Scott Nelson	15–13	4–8	5th	
1989	Scott Nelson	11–19	2–10	6th	
1990	Scott Nelson	11–15	3–9	6th	
Scott Nelson:		168–182–1 (.480)	29–69 (.296)		
Patti Hagemeyer (Big Eight Conference) (1991–1993)
1991	Patti Hagemeyer	7–22	1–11	T–6th	
1992	Patti Hagemeyer	7–22	0–12	7th	
1993	Patti Hagemeyer	7–25	0–12	7th	
Patti Hagemeyer:		24–66 (.267)	1–35 (.028)		
Jim Moore (Big Eight Conference) (1994–1996)
1994	Jim Moore	14–13	3–9	6th	
1995	Jim Moore	21–12	5–7	5th	NIVC Tournament 2nd Round
Jim Moore (Big 12 Conference) (1994–1996)
1996	Jim Moore	26–9	13–7	T–4th	NCAA Second Round
Jim Moore:		61–34 (.642)	21–23 (.477)		
Jim McLaughlin (Big 12 Conference) (1997–2000)
1997	Jim McLaughlin	20–13	11–9	6th	NCAA First Round
1998	Jim McLaughlin	19–12	12–8	5th	NCAA Second Round
1999	Jim McLaughlin	21–9	14–6	4th	NCAA Second Round
2000	Jim McLaughlin	22–9	14–6	T–2nd	NCAA Sweet Sixteen
Jim McLaughlin:		82–43 (.656)	51–29 (.638)		
Suzie Fritz (Big 12 Conference) (2001–2022)
2001	Suzie Fritz	20–8	15–5	3rd	NCAA Second Round
2002	Suzie Fritz	21–9	16–4	2nd	NCAA Second Round
2003	Suzie Fritz	30–5	18–2	1st	NCAA Sweet Sixteen
2004	Suzie Fritz	20–11	13–7	5th	NCAA Second Round
2005	Suzie Fritz	21–11	11–9	4th	NCAA Second Round
2006	Suzie Fritz	12–18	4–16	10th	
2007	Suzie Fritz	23–9	14–6	3rd	NCAA Second Round
2008	Suzie Fritz	24–8	18–2	3rd	NCAA First Round
2009	Suzie Fritz	12–18	6–14	9th	
2010	Suzie Fritz	12–19	6–14	9th	
2011	Suzie Fritz	22–11	9–7	4th	NCAA Sweet Sixteen
2012	Suzie Fritz	21–9	8–8	5th	NCAA First Round
2013	Suzie Fritz	18–11	6–10	5th	
2014	Suzie Fritz	22–8	8–8	5th	NCAA First Round
2015	Suzie Fritz	17–12	9–7	T–4th	NCAA First Round
2016	Suzie Fritz	21–10	9–7	T–4th	NCAA Second Round
2017	Suzie Fritz	10–19	3–13	9th	
2018	Suzie Fritz	15–12	5–11	8th	
2019	Suzie Fritz	4–12	9–19	T–8th	
2020	Suzie Fritz	10–6	13–8	3rd	
2021	Suzie Fritz	15–13	6–10	7th	NCAA First Round
2022	Suzie Fritz	15–14	6–10	6th	
Suzie Fritz:		393–263 (.599)	201–191 (–)		
Jason Mansfield (Big 12 Conference) (2023–present)
2023	Jason Mansfield	0–0	0–0		
Jason Mansfield:		0–0 (–)	0–0 (–)		
Total:		893–699–12 (.560)			
National champion Postseason invitational champion Conference regular season champion Conference regular season and conference tournament champion Division regular season champion Division regular season and conference tournament champion Conference tournament champion

== Coaches' history ==
All-Time coaches:

- Ann Heider (1974): 22–20–4, .524
- Mary Phyl Dwight (1975–78): 107–91–05, .540
- Ron Spies (1979): 15–16–3, .686
- Scott Nelson (1980–90): 168–176–1, .488
- Patti Hagemeyer (1991–93): 24–66, .267
- Jim Moore (1994–96): 61–34, .642
- Jim McLaughlin (1997–2000): 82–43, .656
- Suzie Fritz (2001–2022): 393–263, .599
- Jason Mansfield (2023–present): 44-38 .537

== See also ==
- List of NCAA Division I women's volleyball programs
