= J. A. Ewing =

J. A. Ewing may refer to:

- James Alfred Ewing (1855–1935), Scottish physicist and engineer
- James Arthur Ewing (born 1916), 40th Governor of American Samoa
