= Minnesota Golden Gophers women's volleyball =

Women's volleyball team of the University of Minnesota

- University: University of Minnesota
- Head coach: Keegan Cook (4th season)
- Conference: Big Ten
- Location: Minneapolis, Minnesota, US
- Home arena: Maturi Pavilion (capacity: 5,700)
- Nickname: Golden Gophers
- Colors: Maroon and gold

AIAW/NCAA tournament runner-up
- 2004

AIAW/NCAA tournament semifinal
- 2003, 2004, 2009, 2015, 2016, 2019

AIAW/NCAA Regional Final
- 2003, 2004, 2006, 2009, 2012, 2015, 2016, 2019, 2021

AIAW/NCAA regional semifinal
- 1989, 1993, 1999, 2000, 2002, 2003, 2004, 2006, 2009, 2010, 2011, 2012, 2013, 2015, 2016, 2017, 2018, 2019, 2020*, 2021, 2022, 2025

AIAW/NCAA tournament appearance
- 1989, 1993, 1996, 1997, 1999, 2000, 2001, 2002, 2003, 2004, 2005, 2006, 2007, 2008, 2009, 2010, 2011, 2012, 2013, 2015, 2016, 2017, 2018, 2019, 2020*, 2021, 2022, 2023, 2024, 2025

Conference regular season champion
- 2002, 2015, 2018

Minnesota Golden Gophers volleyball is the NCAA Division I women's volleyball team at the University of Minnesota in Minneapolis. The program began its first season in 1972 under head coach Dee Jilek. Its current head coach is Keegan Cook, who took over the team at the conclusion of the 2022 season, following the resignation of Hugh McCutcheon. Previous coach Mike Hebert had led the Golden Gophers to every NCAA Tournament, with the exception of 1998, when he was head coach of the team. His tenure was highlighted by back-to-back NCAA Final Four appearances in 2003 and 2004. Hebert also led Minnesota the program's first Big Ten title in 2002.

== History ==
=== 2003 ===
Even with a 13 overall tournament seed, Minnesota beat Washington in the regional final in five sets to advance to the school's first NCAA Final Four. In the national semifinals, Minnesota played top ranked and undefeated Southern California tough, but fell in three sets. Minnesota was led by Cassie Busse with 23 kills and Erin Martin with 11.

=== 2004 ===
The tournament's #4 overall seed, Minnesota defeated fifth-seeded Ohio State in the regional final to advance to their second straight national semifinal. Once again, they met Southern California, but the outcome was different than the previous year. Behind 18 kills from Minnesota's Erin Martin, the Golden Gophers defeated the two-time defending NCAA Champions in four sets to advance to the program's first NCAA national championship.

In the final against Stanford, Minnesota could not stop Ogonna Nnamani and struggled to find an offensive rhythm, falling in three straight sets to finish as national runners-up. Despite leaving the match against Stanford with a neck injury, Minnesota All-American libero Paula Gentil set an NCAA tournament record for digs in the NCAA tournament with 173 total in six matches.

=== 2009 ===
Minnesota, the 11th seed, earned its third Final Four appearance since 2003 by defeating third seeded Florida State 3–1 (25–20, 25–7, 18–25, 25–17). This appearance marks the second time Minnesota has qualified for the Final Four via playing on its home court: "The Sports Pavilion" – the first time occurred during the 2004 tournament. Minnesota was knocked out of the national semifinals by Texas in three sets.

=== 2015 ===
After a frustrating 2014 season that saw the Golden Gophers miss the NCAA tournament for the first time since 1998, Minnesota started the season unranked in the AVCA preseason poll, and was picked to finish fifth in the Big Ten. Under the stewardship of Big Ten Coach of the Year and AVCA Coach of the Year Hugh McCutcheon, and led by the play of four AVCA All-Americans, Minnesota trumped all expectations, on its way to an 18–2 Big Ten conference record that was the best in its history and earned the program its second-ever Big Ten conference championship, the first one since 2002. The Golden Gophers entered the NCAA Tournament with a 26–4 record that earned them the top seed in their bracket and the No. 2 overall seed. After dropping just one set in regional play, Minnesota arrived at the Final Four in Omaha, Nebraska, where it lost in the national semifinals to the Texas Longhorns.

=== 2016 ===
Minnesota lost 3–1 to eventual national champion Stanford in the 2016 NCAA semifinals. Minnesota had been ranked #1 in the final AVCA regular-season poll, but were seeded #2 going into the tournament, behind #1 Nebraska.

=== 2019 ===
As the overall #7 seed in the tournament, Minnesota advanced to its sixth Final Four in program history with a 3-0 sweep of unseeded Louisville. As in 2016, Minnesota lost to eventual national champion Stanford in the 2019 NCAA semifinals.

== Players ==
=== All-Americans ===
A list of first, second, third team and honorable mention AVCA All-American volleyball players.

- 1996 – Katrien DeDecker (1st team)
- 1999 – Nicole Branagh (2nd team)
- 2000 – Nicole Branagh (2nd team); Stephanie Hagen (2nd team)
- 2002 – Cassie Busse (2nd team); Paula Gentil (3rd team)
- 2003 – Cassie Busse (1st team); Paula Gentil (2nd team)
- 2004 – Kelly Bowman (1st team); Paula Gentil (1st team); Erin Martin (honorable mention)
- 2005 - Paula Gentil (Honorable Mention)
- 2006 – Meredith Nelson (2nd team)
- 2008 – Brook Dieter (2nd team); Lauren Gibbemeyer (3rd team)
- 2009 – Lauren Gibbemeyer(1st team); Taylor Carico (3rd team)
- 2011 – Ashley Wittman (2nd team); Tori Dixon (Honorable Mention)
- 2012 – Katherine Harms (1st team); Tori Dixon (2nd team); Ashley Wittman (Honorable Mention)
- 2013 - Tori Dixon (1st team); Ashley Wittman (2nd team); Adrianna Nora (Honorable Mention)
- 2014 - Paige Tapp (3rd team); Daly Santana (Honorable Mention)
- 2015 – Hannah Tapp (1st team); Daly Santana (1st team); Samantha Seliger-Swenson (2nd team); Paige Tapp (3rd team)
- 2016 - Sarah Wilhite (1st team); Samantha Seliger-Swenson (1st team); Hannah Tapp (2nd team); Alexis Hart (Honorable Mention) Molly Lohman (Honorable Mention)
- 2017 - Stephanie Samedy (1st team); Samantha Seliger-Swenson (2nd team); Alexis Hart (3rd team); Molly Lohman (Honorable Mention)
- 2018 - Stephanie Samedy (1st team); Samantha Seliger-Swenson (1st team); Regan Pittman (2nd team); Alexis Hart (Honorable Mention); Adanna Rollins (Honorable Mention); Taylor Morgan (Honorable Mention)
- 2019 - Stephanie Samedy (2nd team); Regan Pittman (1st team); Alexis Hart (3rd team); CC McGraw (Honorable Mention)
- 2020 - Stephanie Samedy (1st team); Regan Pittman (Honorable Mention); Taylor Landfair (Honorable Mention)
- 2021 - Stephanie Samedy (1st team); CC McGraw (Honorable Mention)
- 2022 - Taylor Landfair (1st team)
- 2024 - Julia Hanson (Honorable Mention); Melani Shaffmaster (Honorable Mention)
- 2025 - Julia Hanson (2nd team)

== Season-by-season results ==
Season	Coach	Record		Postseason
Season	Coach	Overall	Conference (Conf. Standing)	Postseason
1972	Dee Jelik	8–3	–	
1973	Dee Jelik	16–11	–	
1974	Linda Wells	31–6–1	–	
1975	Rosie Wegrich	35–13	–	
1976	Rosie Wegrich	36–17–1	–	
1977	Linda Wells	43–21–2	–	
1978	Linda Wells	58–14	–	
1979	Linda Wells	39–16–2	–	
1980	Linda Wells	37–19	–	
1981	Linda Wells	37–19	8–6 (4th)	
1982	Stephanie Schleuder	23–9	8–5 (T-2nd-West)	
1983	Stephanie Schleuder	15–16	6–7 (3rd-West)	
1984	Stephanie Schleuder	16–16	4–9 (4th-West)	
1985	Stephanie Schleuder	22–12	11–7 (4th)	
1986	Stephanie Schleuder	21–11	13–5 (2nd)	
1987	Stephanie Schleuder	24–11	12–6 (3rd)	
1988	Stephanie Schleuder	21–10	11–7 (T-2nd)	
1989	Stephanie Schleuder	29–9	13–5 (T-2nd)	NCAA Second Round
1990	Stephanie Schleuder	8–26	2–16 (9th)	
1991	Stephanie Schleuder	14–16	11–8 (5th)	
1992	Stephanie Schleuder	25–12	13–7 (4th)	
1993	Stephanie Schleuder	14–10	14–6 (T-3rd)	NCAA Regional semifinal
1994	Stephanie Schleuder	21–15	10–10 (6th)	
1995	Pam Miller-Dombeck	13–17	7–13 (8th)	
1996	Mike Hebert	24–11	14–6 (4th)	NCAA Second Round
1997	Mike Hebert	23–10	12–8 (T-5th)	NCAA Second Round
1998	Mike Hebert	17–14	7–13 (8th)	
1999	Mike Hebert	27–9	15–5 (2nd)	NCAA Regional semifinal
2000	Mike Hebert	30–4	17–3 (2nd)	NCAA Regional semifinal
2001	Mike Hebert	19–13	10–10 (T-6th)	NCAA Second Round
2002	Mike Hebert	32–6	17–3 (1st)	NCAA Regional semifinal
2003	Mike Hebert	26–11	15–5 (T-2nd)	NCAA Final Four
2004	Mike Hebert	33–5	17–3 (T-2nd)	NCAA Runners-Up
2005	Mike Hebert	25–8	14–6 (T-3rd)	NCAA Second Round
2006	Mike Hebert	26–8	17–3 (T-2nd)	NCAA Regional Final
2007	Mike Hebert	18–13	11–9 (T-3rd)	NCAA first round
2008	Mike Hebert	27–7	16–4 (2nd)	NCAA Second Round
2009	Mike Hebert	28–9	15–5 (3rd)	NCAA Final Four
2010	Mike Hebert	26–9	14–6 (T-2nd)	NCAA Regional semifinal
2011	Laura Bush	20–12	11–9 (5th)	NCAA Regional semifinal
2012	Hugh McCutcheon	27–8	15–5 (3rd)	NCAA Regional Final
2013	Hugh McCutcheon	29–7	15–5 (3rd)	NCAA Regional semifinal
2014	Hugh McCutcheon	19–12	9–11 (8th)	
2015	Hugh McCutcheon	30–5	18–2 (1st)	NCAA Final Four
2016	Hugh McCutcheon	29–5	17–3 (2nd)	NCAA Final Four
2017	Hugh McCutcheon	28–6	15–5 (3rd)	NCAA Regional semifinal
2018	Hugh McCutcheon	27–4	19–1 (1st)	NCAA Regional semifinal
2019	Hugh McCutcheon	27–6	17–3 (T–2nd)	NCAA Final Four
2020	Hugh McCutcheon	16–3	15–2 (3rd)	NCAA Regional semifinal
2021	Hugh McCutcheon	23–9	15–5 (T–3rd)	NCAA Regional Final
2022	Hugh McCutcheon	22–9	15–5 (T–3rd)	NCAA Regional semifinal
2023	Keegan Cook	17–13	12–8 (5th)	NCAA Second Round
2024	Keegan Cook	21–11	13–7 (T–6th)	NCAA Second Round
2025	Keegan Cook	24–10	12–8 (T–6th)	NCAA Regional semifinal

== See also ==
- List of NCAA Division I women's volleyball programs
