= Bajema =

Bajema is a surname. Notable people with the surname include:

- Billy Bajema (born 1982), American football player
- Kara Bajema (born 1998), American volleyball player
