= Washington Huskies women's volleyball =

American college volleyball team

- Founded: 1974; 52 years ago
- University: University of Washington
- Athletic director: Patrick Chun
- Head coach: Leslie Gabriel
- Conference: Big Ten
- Location: Seattle, Washington
- Home arena: Hec Edmundson Pavilion (capacity: 10,000)
- Nickname: Huskies
- Colors: Purple and gold

AIAW/NCAA tournament champion
- 2005

AIAW/NCAA tournament semifinal
- 2004, 2005, 2006, 2013, 2020

AIAW/NCAA Regional Final
- 1988, 2003, 2004, 2005, 2006, 2008, 2010, 2013, 2015, 2016, 2019, 2020

AIAW/NCAA regional semifinal
- 1979, 1980, 1988, 1997, 2003, 2004, 2005, 2006, 2008, 2010, 2012, 2013, 2014, 2015, 2016, 2018, 2019, 2020, 2021

AIAW/NCAA tournament appearance
- 1979, 1980, 1986, 1988, 1989, 1994, 1996, 1997, 2002, 2003, 2004, 2005, 2006, 2007, 2008, 2009, 2010, 2011, 2012, 2013, 2014, 2015, 2016, 2017, 2018, 2019, 2020, 2021, 2022, 2024

Conference regular season champion
- 1980, 2004, 2005, 2013, 2015, 2016, 2020, 2021

The Washington Huskies volleyball team is the intercollegiate women's volleyball team of the University of Washington in Seattle. They compete in the Big Ten Conference and play their home games at Alaska Airlines Arena at Hec Edmundson Pavilion, which was built in 1927 and renovated in 2000. The Huskies have reached the NCAA Final Four on five occasions with one national title (2005), and won multiple Pac-10/12 championships.

== Head coaching ==
- 1974–1975: Joyce Johnson
- 1976–1977: Carol Garringer
- 1978–1983: Steve Suttich
- 1984–1987: Lindy Vivas
- 1988–1991: Debbie Buse
- 1991–2000: Bill Neville
- 2001–2014: Jim McLaughlin
- 2015–2022: Keegan Cook
- 2023–present: Leslie Gabriel

1980's AIAW team finished 28–12 with Lisa Baughn being named the All-American.

1988 was a significant year for the Husky VB Program. This year the team made its first NCAA tournament, elite eight appearance. Behind the leadership of its first ever AVCA 1st Team All-American Laurie Wetzel (Puyallup, WA), the lady Huskies finished tied for fifth having beaten Stanford though coming up short against the UCLA Bruins.

USA National Team coach Bill Neville (UW: 1991–2000) led the program in its recruiting out of Woodinville, Washington; now, it is UW Associate Head Coach Leslie Tuiasosopo-Gabriel who has continued on as leadership of the Husky program. In these experimental years, Neville's swing hitters' offense was fashioned after the contemporaneous international men's game.

== History ==
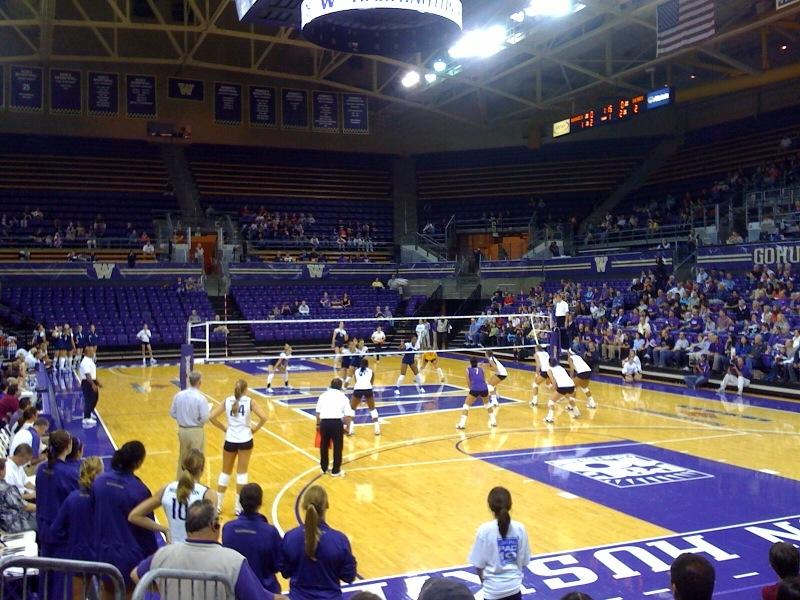
UW volleyball vs. Cal in a battle of national AVCA top 10 teams.

When McLaughlin took over the Washington program in 2001, the team was last in the Pac-10 Conference. In his first year at UW, he led the Huskies to an 11–16 record and a 4–14 mark in the Pac-10. The team's 11 wins in 2001 were the most for the program since 1997 (it had been '97 that UW made the NCAA Sweet Sixteen). Just one year later, the Huskies went 20–11 and made the NCAA second round. Since 2003, Washington has not won fewer than 23 matches or lost more than nine in any season.

In 2004, the Huskies won their first-ever Pac-10 title, and McLaughlin earned his first AVCA National Coach of the Year honor. In his fifth year at UW in 2005, he led the program to its only national title and a 32–1 (.970) record as Washington swept all six of their matches in the tournament, including top-ranked Nebraska in the final at the Alamodome in San Antonio. McLaughlin was named the Pac-10 Coach of the Year, and made history as the first coach in NCAA history to win a national championship in both men and women's volleyball, having led the USC men's team to a national title in 1990.

In 2006, he led UW to its third straight national semifinal, but the Dawgs fell to runner-up Stanford.

The NCAA Championships were hosted in Seattle at KeyArena at Seattle Center in 2013. The Huskies, led by AVCA National Player of the Year and Honda Award Winner Krista Vansant, won the Pac-12 title and reached the Final Four, but they fell in straight sets in the semifinals to eventual national champion Penn State.

There had been 35 All-Americans and 9 Academic All-Americans since McLaughlin's deeded arrival.

Keegan's tenure has begun with the awarding of several All-Americans significantly, in Kara Bajema (c/o 2019), Lianna Sybeldon (consensus) and Courtney Schwan (uniquely, of the PNW).

The program, the Pacific Northwest (Portland, OR; Seattle-Tacoma, WA; Spokane, WA; Boise, ID, has been a national leading attendance draw. Their turnstile numbers consistently rank among top 10 averages.

== Season-by-season results ==
Record table
Season	Team	Overall	Conference	Standing	Postseason
Jim McLaughlin (Pac-10 Conference) (2001–2010)
2001	Washington	11–16	4–14	8th	
2002	Washington	20–11	9–9	T-5th	NCAA Second Round
2003	Washington	23–9	10–8	T-5th	NCAA Quarterfinals
2004	Washington	28–3	16–2	1st	NCAA Semifinals
2005	Washington	32–1	16–1	2nd	NCAA Champion
2006	Washington	29–5	15–3	T-2nd	NCAA Semifinals
2007	Washington	27–4	15–3	2nd	NCAA Second Round
2008	Washington	27–6	15–3	2nd	NCAA Quarterfinals
2009	Washington	24–6	13–5	T-2nd	NCAA Second Round
2010	Washington	24–9	10–8	5th	NCAA Quarterfinals
Jim McLaughlin (Pac-12 Conference) (2011–2014)
2011	Washington	24–8	15–7	T-4th	NCAA Second Round
2012	Washington	25–7	14–6	T-4th	NCAA Round of 16
2013	Washington	30–3	18–2	1st	NCAA Semifinals
2014	Washington	31–3	18–2	2nd	NCAA Round of 16
Jim McLaughlin:		355–90 (.798)	189–73 (.721)		
Keegan Cook (Pac-12 Conference) (2015–2022)
2015	Washington	31–3	18–2	T-1st	NCAA Quarterfinals
2016	Washington	29–5	16–4	1st	NCAA Quarterfinals
2017	Washington	25–8	14–6	T-2nd	NCAA Second Round
2018	Washington	20–13	10–10	T-6th	NCAA Round of 16
2019	Washington	27–7	15–5	2nd	NCAA Quarterfinals
2020	Washington	20–4	17–3	1st	NCAA Semifinals
2021	Washington	25–6	17–3	1st	NCAA Round of 16
2022	Washington	20–11	12-8	T-5th	NCAA First Round
Keegan Cook:		197–57 (.776)	119–41 (.744)		
Leslie Gabriel (Pac-12 Conference) (2023–2023)
2023	Washington	16-15	7-13	8th	
Leslie Gabriel (Big Ten Conference) (2024–present)
2024	Washington	19-12	9-11	9th	NCAA First Round
2025	Washington	13-17	8-12	T-10th	
Leslie Gabriel:		48–44 (.522)	24–36 (.400)		
Total:		1078–559 (.659)			
National champion Postseason invitational champion Conference regular season champion Conference regular season and conference tournament champion Division regular season champion Division regular season and conference tournament champion Conference tournament champion

=== Notable players ===
- Melinda Beckenhauer 2x All-America (1988–89); 1st noteworthy transfer into the "U-District" from the University of Hawaii at Manoa
- Leslie Gabriel (née Tuiasosopo); professional volleyball player post-BCS; current UW associate headcoach (2001–present)
- Sanja Tomasevic 3x AVCA All-America (2003–05); 2005 Volleyball Magazine NCAA women's P.O.Y. Current Head Coach at Arizona State University.
- Christal Morrison program's only 4x All-American (2004–07); current member of the Association of Volleyball Professionals
- Courtney Thompson
- Stevie Mussie 2006 Seattle Regional MVP; 2007 All-Pac10 1st Team selection. Coast-to-coast juniors' club and NCAA collegiate coach.
- Jill Collymore 2009 all-star (Pac-10 Scholar Athlete of the Year, USAV Open MVP at Nationals (upwards U.S. A2 National Teams))
- Tamari Miyashiro 3x All-America (2007–09); current USA National Team libero
- Bianca Rowland program's only non-Prepvolleyball.com Wa. Senior Ace athlete, out of Seattle's King's High School, to become AVCA All-American in 2011
- Krista Vansant 3x All-American (2012–14); first Husky named AVCA P.O.Y. in 2013 and Academic All-American P.O.Y. in 2014 /to program's twice Honda Award winner following 2005's Courtney Thompson
- 2015-16 Graduating Class Six seniors left UW with the most wins of any class in school history; their four-year record was 117–16 (.880).
- Courtney Schwan 2x AVCA All-American, hailed from the South Puget Sound. All academic honors awardee, in the Pac-12, by her senior year (2017).
- Kara Bajema 2x U.S. National All-American, from the USA-Canada Border as home. 2016 all Pac-12 & all Frosh (as a Blocker); and/to 2019 AVCA 1st Team all-American (as a Hitter).

=== Retired numbers ===
The program has retired two jersey numbers.

Number	Player
3	Courtney Thompson
16	Krista Vansant

== See also ==
- List of NCAA Division I women's volleyball programs
