= Marques Tuiasosopo =

American football player and coach (born 1979)

Detroit Lions
- Title: Offensive assistant

Personal information
- Born: March 22, 1979 (age 47); Long Beach, California, U.S.
- Listed height: 6 ft 1 in (1.85 m)
- Listed weight: 220 lb (100 kg)

Career information
- Position: Quarterback (No. 8)
- High school: Woodinville (WA)
- College: Washington
- NFL draft: 2001: 2nd round, 59th overall pick

Career history

Playing
- Oakland Raiders (2001–2006); New York Jets (2007); Oakland Raiders (2008)

Coaching
- Washington (2009–2010) Assistant strength & conditioning coach; UCLA (2011) Graduate assistant; UCLA (2012) Tight ends coach; Washington (2013) Quarterbacks coach; Washington (2013) Interim head coach; USC (2014–2015) Associate head coach & tight ends coach; UCLA (2016) Quarterbacks coach; California (2017–2018) Quarterbacks coach; California (2019–2020) Tight ends coach; Rice (2021–2024) Offensive coordinator & quarterbacks coach; Detroit Lions (2025–present) Offensive assistant

Awards and highlights
- As player: Pop Warner Trophy (2000); 8th in Heisman voting (2000); Pac-10 Offensive Player of the Year (2000); Rose Bowl Player of the Game (2001)

Career NFL statistics
- Passing attempts: 90
- Passing completions: 49
- Completion percentage: 54.4%
- TD–INT: 2–7
- Passing yards: 554
- Passer rating: 48.1
- Stats at Pro Football Reference

Head coaching record
- Career: NCAA: 1–0 (1.000)

Marques Tavita Tuiasosopo (born March 22, 1979) is an American college football coach and former player. He played as a quarterback for eight seasons in the National Football League (NFL) with the Oakland Raiders and the New York Jets. Tuiasosopo played college football for the Washington Huskies and was selected by the Raiders in the second round of the 2001 NFL draft.

In 2013, he returned to his alma mater as the quarterbacks coach and later served as interim head coach for the Fight Hunger Bowl. He also held the position of tight ends coach for the California Golden Bears.

== Early life ==
Born in Long Beach, California, Tuiasosopo was raised in Woodinville, a suburb northeast of Seattle. An excellent athlete, he was also a standout shortstop in baseball at Woodinville High School. After his senior year, Tuiasosopo was selected in the 28th round of the 1997 MLB draft by the Minnesota Twins, but chose to play college football instead. Although he played on both offense & defense in high school (option quarterback & safety), he was primarily recruited by Division I football programs to play defense.

Tuiasosopo accepted a football scholarship to the nearby University of Washington in Seattle, primarily because head coach Jim Lambright was one of the few that granted him the opportunity to compete at quarterback, rather than just at safety.

== College career ==
As true freshman in 1997, eighteen-year-old Tuiasosopo rose to second on the depth chart at quarterback. In the season's third week, he was called into action in a nationally televised home game against Nebraska, due to an injury to starter Brock Huard. Despite losing 27–14, Tuiasosopo was impressive against the sixth-ranked (and eventual national champion) Cornhuskers, throwing for 270 yards and two touchdowns. Later in the year against Oregon, he became the Huskies' first true freshman to start a game at quarterback, throwing for 261 yards and rushing for 95, in a 31–28 loss. He also played considerably the following year for the oft-injured Huard, and was never redshirted. Following his sophomore season in 1998, Rick Neuheisel replaced Lambright as head coach and named Tuiasosopo as the starting quarterback to replace the graduating Huard. As a junior in October 1999, Tuiasosopo became the first player in NCAA college football history to pass for over 300 yards and run for over 200 yards in a game, during a 35–30 victory over the Stanford Cardinal at Husky Stadium. That year, he led the Huskies to a 6–2 conference record, finishing in second place to the Cardinal and earning the team a bid to the Holiday Bowl.

As a senior in 2000, he led the Huskies to the Pac-10 title and a 34–24 Rose Bowl victory over Drew Brees and the Purdue Boilermakers, and was named the Player of the Game. The Huskies finished the season with an 11–1 record, ranked third in the national polls. The season included a victory over the #4 Miami Hurricanes at Husky Stadium in September, the Hurricanes' only loss of the season. Tuiasosopo threw for 225 yards and a touchdown, and ran for 45 yards and another touchdown in the 34–29 win, earning national acclaim while finishing eighth in Heisman voting.

While at Washington, Tuiasosopo majored in business administration.

== Professional career ==
Pre-draft measurables
Height	Weight	Arm length	Hand span	40-yard dash	10-yard split	20-yard split	20-yard shuttle	Three-cone drill	Vertical jump	Broad jump
6 ft 1 1/8 in (1.86 m)	223 lb (101 kg)	31 in (0.79 m)	9 in (0.23 m)	4.71 s	1.63 s	2.71 s	4.35 s	7.36 s	35.5 in (0.90 m)	9 ft 7 in (2.92 m)
All values from NFL Combine

=== Oakland Raiders (first stint) ===
Tuiasosopo was selected by the Raiders in the second round of the 2001 NFL draft, the 59th overall pick and the fourth quarterback selected (behind Michael Vick, Drew Brees, and Quincy Carter).

In the NFL, Tuiasosopo was primarily a reserve quarterback, the Raiders' backup to Rich Gannon and Kerry Collins. He was on the sidelines for Super Bowl XXXVII at the conclusion of the 2002 season, but did not appear in the game as his team lost 48–21. His first significant playing time came during a Monday Night Football game against the Kansas City Chiefs during the 2003 season, throwing for 224 yards, all in the second half, after Gannon exited the game with a shoulder injury; Gannon would spend the rest of the 2003 season on injured reserve. Marques played well enough to earn his first career NFL start the following week, but struggled, throwing for just 65 yards along with an interception before leaving the game with an injury late in the first half. He did not start another game until late in the 2005 season, where he again struggled losing 26–10. He was promptly demoted back to the sidelines the next week. The team finished just 4–12 in the 2005 season with primarily Collins as the starting quarterback, paving the way for the younger Tuiasosopo to receive more consideration for the job.

=== New York Jets ===
Tuiasosopo signed a one-year contract with the New York Jets on March 23, 2007.

=== Oakland Raiders (second stint) ===
A free agent in the 2008 offseason, Tuiasosopo re-signed with the Raiders on May 22, on a one-year contract in his final NFL season.

== Coaching career ==
Following his playing career, Tuiasosopo became an assistant strength coach in 2009 at his alma mater, the University of Washington. He moved to UCLA in 2011, on the staff of Neuheisel, his former head coach. He remained with UCLA under new head coach Jim Mora as the tight ends coach in 2012, then returned to Washington in 2013 as quarterbacks coach under fifth-year head coach Steve Sarkisian. Upon Sarkisian's acceptance of the USC head coaching job at the end of the regular season, Tuiasosopo was named interim head coach for Washington's bowl game. Shortly after leading the Huskies to a win in the Fight Hunger Bowl, Tuiasosopo left Washington to join Sarkisian's staff at USC as tight ends coach and was also given the title of associate head coach.

Following the 2015 season at USC, Tuiasosopo returned to UCLA in January 2016 as quarterbacks coach/passing game coordinator under Mora.

On January 23, 2017, Tuiasosopo was announced as the quarterbacks coach/passing game coordinator for the University of California, Berkeley under new head coach Justin Wilcox. In 2019, the program realigned the coaching staff and he began working with the tight ends.

Tuiasosopo left California to become the offensive coordinator at Rice in 2021.

On February 18, 2025, the Detroit Lions hired Tuiasosopo to serve as an offensive assistant.

== Personal life ==
Tuiasosopo is the son of former NFL defensive lineman Manu Tuiasosopo, who played collegiately for UCLA, then professionally from 1979 to 1986 for the Seahawks and 49ers, being a starter at nose tackle and winning Super Bowl XIX. Marques' brother is fullback Zach Tuiasosopo, who played for the Philadelphia Eagles until he was waived on July 11, 2007. Zach and Marques were also teammates on the Raiders for part of a season. His youngest brother, Matt, played baseball for the Seattle Mariners, Detroit Tigers and Atlanta Braves. Their sister Leslie Gabriel, the eldest of the five siblings, played volleyball for Washington, trained with the U.S. national team, and as of 2024 was the Huskies head coach. Marques' younger sister, Ashley, played outfield for the Washington softball team and helped lead the Huskies to a national championship in 2009.

His wife, Lisa, is a former collegiate volleyball player and they have three children.

== Head coaching record ==
Year	Team	Overall	Conference	Standing	Bowl/playoffs	Coaches^{#}	AP^{°}
Washington Huskies (Pac-12 Conference) (2013)
2013	Washington	1–0 (Note: Steve Sarkisian became head coach of the USC Trojans at the end of the 2013 regular season. Tuiasosopo was appointed as interim head coach and coached the team in the Fight Hunger Bowl.)	0–0	(North)	W Fight Hunger Bowl		25
Washington:		1–0	0–0				
Total:		1–0					
^{#}Rankings from final Coaches Poll.; ^{°}Rankings from final AP Poll.

== See also ==
- Washington Huskies football statistical leaders
