= Harold Houser =

Harold Alexander Houser

Governor of American Samoa
- In office September 10, 1945 – April 22, 1947
- Preceded by: Samuel Canan
- Succeeded by: Vernon Huber

Personal details
- Born: March 31, 1897 Fort Valley, Georgia
- Died: September 3, 1981 (aged 84) National Naval Medical Center
- Resting place: United States Naval Academy Cemetery
- Spouse: Vera Allen Houser
- Education: United States Naval Academy
- Occupation: Naval officer

Military service
- Allegiance: United States
- Branch/service: United States Navy
- Rank: Rear admiral
- Commands: Naval Air Station Key West; Office of Legislative Liaison

Harold Alexander Houser (March 31, 1897 – September 3, 1981) was a United States Navy Rear admiral, and the governor of American Samoa from September 10, 1945, to April 22, 1947.

== Biography ==
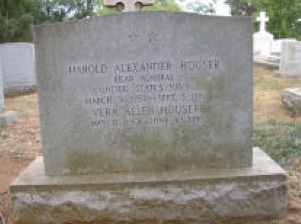
Houser's grave at the United States Naval Academy Cemetery in Annapolis, Maryland.

Houser was born in Fort Valley, Georgia to Emmett and Mary Mathews Houser. Houser attended the Marion Military Institute, graduating in 1916, before receiving an appointment to the United States Naval Academy on May 26, 1917. Houser graduated from the United States Naval Academy in the Class of 1921. During his naval career, he served in numerous posts, including commanding the Naval Air Station Key West and serving as a gunnery officer aboard the USS Omaha.

He was married to Vera Allen Houser.

== Naval career ==
Houser held posts in Panama, France, and Key West throughout his career. He was appointed to the United States Naval Academy on May 26, 1917 from Georgia, and graduated in 1921. While a Commander, Houser served as the gunnery officer of the USS Omaha (CL-4). As a Captain, Houser commanded the Naval Air Station Key West.

After becoming a Rear admiral, Houser served on the staff of the United States Secretary of Defense. Houser served numerous posts in the Office of Legislative Affairs, including becoming the legislative liaison for the Retired Officers Association. He became the Director of the Office of Legislative Liaison in 1949.

== Governorship ==
Houser became Governor of American Samoa on September 10, 1945. While governor, he served as a representative of the United States Navy at a meeting of the major Pacific powers, including Australia and New Zealand. He ceded the office to Vernon Huber on April 22, 1947.

Houser became a Rear Admiral after leaving the governorship, and served as Director of the Office of Legislative Liaison at the Office of Legislative Affairs

== Death ==
Houser died of natural causes on the day September 3, 1981 at the National Naval Medical Center. He is interred at the United States Naval Academy Cemetery, along with his wife.
