= Phelps Phelps =

American politician

The Honorable Phelps Phelps
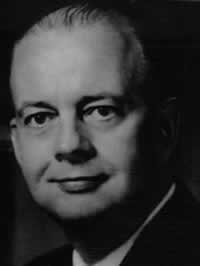

United States Ambassador to the Dominican Republic
- In office June 27, 1952 – May 30, 1953
- President: Harry S. Truman; Dwight D. Eisenhower
- Preceded by: Ralph H. Ackerman
- Succeeded by: William T. Pheiffer

1st Civilian Governor of American Samoa
- In office February 23, 1951 – June 20, 1952
- President: Harry S. Truman
- Preceded by: Thomas Darden
- Succeeded by: John C. Elliott

Member of the New York Senate from the 13th district
- In office 1939–1942

Member of the New York State Assembly from the 3rd District
- In office 1937–1938

Member of the New York State Assembly from the 10th District
- In office 1924–1928

Personal details
- Born: Phelps von Rottenburg; May 4, 1897 Bonn, German Empire (now Germany)
- Died: June 10, 1981 (aged 84) Wildwood, New Jersey, U.S.
- Resting place: Arlington National Cemetery
- Party: Republican; Democratic
- Education: Williams College; Fordham Law School (JD)
- Occupation: Attorney and politician

Military service
- Allegiance: United States
- Branch/service: United States Army
- Years of service: 1942-1948
- Rank: Captain
- Battles/wars: World War Two

Phelps Phelps (May 4, 1897 – June 10, 1981), born Phelps von Rottenburg, was an American politician who held a number of offices in New York before becoming the governor of American Samoa and the United States Ambassador to the Dominican Republic. Phelps' parents divorced in 1899 and he later took his mother's maiden name as his last name, even though it was already also his first name. He attended Yale University in 1916, but was dismissed for cheating; he eventually graduated from Williams College and then Fordham University Law School, becoming an attorney.

Phelps began his political career as Deputy Commissioner for Veterans Affairs for New York City. From 1924 to 1928, he was a Republican member of the New York State Assembly. After the 1932 Republican National Convention, he became a Democrat, and acted as a delegate at a number of national conventions. He served another term in the State Assembly, and then in the New York State Senate. He also attended a New Jersey Constitutional Convention, hosted a long-running radio commentary show, and was a prolific writer of letters to the editor of major newspapers. Phelps served in the United States Army during World War II, achieving the rank of Captain. Immediately following the war, Phelps served on Douglas MacArthur's staff during the Japanese War Crimes Tribunal.

Upon his appointment as governor to American Samoa in 1951, Phelps became its first civilian governor. The United States Navy largely withdrew from the island with the last naval governor, leaving Phelps to restructure an economy previously centered on the military. He promoted the oil storage facilities on the island and attracted new airlines to Pago Pago International Airport in an attempt to make up lost revenue. His last overseas post was as Ambassador to the Dominican Republic under the rule of Rafael Trujillo. There, he had to negotiate land sales between the two governments and respond to citizen's anger when possible assassinations on United States soil were ordered by Trujillo. Phelps never married or owned property, preferring to wander between various hotels, and lived with four women throughout his life. Phelps died in Wildwood, New Jersey, and is buried at the Arlington National Cemetery.

== Life ==
=== Early life ===
Phelps was born Phelps von Rottenburg on May 4, 1897, in Bonn, Germany, to Franz and Marian Phelps von Rottenburg. His mother came from a wealthy family, and his father, who died when Phelps was nine, worked as a lawyer, but came from a family of shippers. His grandfather was William Walter Phelps, a politician who served multiple terms in the United States House of Representatives out of New Jersey's 5th congressional district and as the United States ambassador to Austria-Hungary; his great-grandfathers were John Jay Phelps and Joseph Earl Sheffield. In 1899, his mother divorced his father and took the children to Teaneck, New Jersey, where they were raised with the help of their grandmother Ellen Maria. Shortly after arriving in New Jersey, Phelps' mother gave him her last name, and he became known as Phelps Phelps. He attended Yale University in 1916, but was dismissed from the school after paying another student to take his exams for him. He graduated from Williams College in 1922, and received his juris doctor from Fordham University School of Law in 1925.

=== Military service ===
Enlisting in August 1917, Phelps attended the aviation school of the United States School of Military Aeronautics in Ithaca, New York. He joined the Royal Flying Corps in Canada, but left later in the year to attend college. During World War II, Phelps served in the reserve corps until enlisting in the United States Army in 1942. He served in the infantry, and eventually achieved the rank of Captain. Following the war, he was on the Japanese War Crimes Tribunal, and was eventually demobilized at Camp Stoneman.

=== Later life ===
After retiring from his two overseas posts, Phelps became a prolific writer of newspaper letters to the editor, including many to newspapers such as The New York Times and Milwaukee Journal Sentinel, where he discussed a wide range of issues. For much of his later life, Phelps lived in Jersey City, New Jersey. A resident of Wildwood, New Jersey, he died there on June 10, 1981, and was buried July 3 of the same year at the Arlington National Cemetery.

== Political career ==
From 1923 to 1924, Phelps held the post of Deputy Commissioner for Veterans Affairs for New York City. He served as a Republican member of the New York State Assembly from Greenwich Village in 1924, 1925, 1926, 1927 and 1928. In 1928, he ran for a nomination for the United States House of Representatives, but lost the primary to Ruth Baker Pratt, who would become the first congresswoman from New York. Following the 1932 Republican National Convention, Phelps became a Democrat, and travelled to the 1936, 1956, and 1960 Democratic National Conventions as a delegate. He was again a member of the State Assembly (New York Co., 3rd D.) in 1937 and 1938; and a member of the New York State Senate (13th D.) from 1939 to 1942, sitting in the 162nd and 163rd New York State Legislatures.

After leaving his diplomatic post in the Dominican Republic, Phelps served as commissioner for the Palisades Interstate Park Commission. He was a delegate to the New Jersey State Constitutional Convention in 1966. He hosted a long-standing radio program, where he commented on politics and current events. When Jimmy Carter became president, Phelps objected to the moral platforms the Democratic Party had chosen to take, and returned to the Republican Party.

== Governorship ==
President of the United States Harry S. Truman appointed Phelps to serve as Governor of American Samoa, making him the first civilian governor of the islands; the previous governors had been naval officers. He began his term on February 23, 1951. Phelps immediately needed to address the failing economy of American Samoa, caused largely by the withdrawal of the United States Navy from the islands with the final naval governor. Phelps attempted to replace the lost military revenue by selling oil from storage facilities to shipping enterprises, drawing in new airlines to Pago Pago International Airport, and encouraging larger copra crop yields.

Phelps criticized the United States military for refusing to build recruitment centers in American Samoa, leaving natives who wanted to enlist the need to travel to Hawaii to do so. He attempted to fix a number of political problems with the island. This led him to fire his attorney general and take measures to improve the relations between inhabitants of the Tutuila and Manu'a islands.

Governor Phelps’s principal challenge was a deteriorating postwar economy. After the U.S. Navy’s departure, he sought outside capital by marketing fuel from naval storage tanks to shipping and by courting South Pacific airlines, while urging increased copra production and handicraft exports to Hawaiʻi. The initiatives yielded limited results: large-vessel fuel capacity reduced bunkering demand, Tafuna’s airport facilities were inadequate for transpacific carriers, and handicraft revenues had little macroeconomic impact.

== Ambassadorship ==
Only days after leaving the governor's seat, Phelps received appointment as the United States Ambassador to the Dominican Republic, serving from June 27, 1952, to May 30, 1953. Dictator Rafael Trujillo was in charge of the Dominican Republic during Phelps' post. Among the issues he faced were accusations of numerous murders of Americans on United States soil ordered and funded by Trujillo. He also negotiated a land deal where Trujillo purchased an empty lot the United States owned in Ciudad Trujillo, now Santo Domingo. Phelps resigned on May 21, 1953, and was replaced by William T. Pheiffer nine days later.

== Personal life ==
Phelps never married, but lived with four different women throughout his lifetime. He was a major baseball fan, and had personal friendships with numerous well-known players of the time. Phelps received much of the attention of his mother and grandmother during his childhood; this led to a strained relationship with his sister, who remained embittered towards him for the rest of her life. She left America in the 1920s, and never spoke with him again. He preferred to live in hotels and move from place to place, and never owned any real estate.

== Bibliography ==
- Phelps, Phelps; Hester Eloise Hosford (1933). America on Trial. T. J. Powers Company.
- Phelps, Phelps; Hester Eloise Hosford (1932). Our Defenses Within and Without. T. J. Powers Company.

New York State Assembly
Preceded by Joseph T. Flynn	New York State Assembly; New York County, 10th District; 1924–1928	Succeeded by Langdon W. Post
Preceded by Eugene R. Duffy	New York State Assembly; New York County, 3rd District; 1937–1938	Succeeded by Maurice E. Downing
New York State Senate
Preceded by Thomas F. Burchill	New York State Senate; 13th District; 1939–1942	Succeeded by Francis J. Mahoney
Government offices
Preceded by Thomas Darden	Governor of American Samoa; 1951–1952	Succeeded by John C. Elliott
Diplomatic posts
Preceded by Ralph H. Ackerman	United States Ambassador to the Dominican Republic; 1952–1953	Succeeded by William T. Pheiffer
