= Thomas Darden =

United States Navy officer (1900–1961)

Thomas Francis Darden Jr.
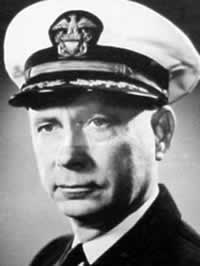

Governor of American Samoa
- In office July 7, 1949 – February 23, 1951
- Preceded by: Vernon Huber
- Succeeded by: Phelps Phelps

Personal details
- Born: September 8, 1900 Brooklyn, New York, US
- Died: June 17, 1961 (aged 60)
- Resting place: Fort Rosecrans National Cemetery
- Occupation: Naval officer

Military service
- Allegiance: United States
- Branch/service: United States Navy
- Rank: Captain
- Commands: USS Benham (DD-397); USS Denver (CL-58); Special Programs Unit
- Battles/wars: Battle of Empress Augusta Bay, Battle of Surigao Strait, Liberation of the Philippines

Thomas Francis Darden Jr. (September 8, 1900 – June 17, 1961) was a U.S. Navy officer who achieved the rank of captain, the commander of a Navy light cruiser during World War II, and was the governor of American Samoa from July 7, 1949 through February 23, 1951. Darden also served on the staffs of two U.S. Navy admirals during the War in the Pacific: rear admirals Henry Hughes Hough and Thomas L. Sprague.

Darden served on and commanded warships, and then in the 1940s was appointed head of the "Special Programs Unit". This unit trained African Americans for accelerated promotion in the Navy; Darden himself advocated for racial integration in the Navy.

Darden also served as the last military governor of American Samoa, and since February 1951, his successors have all been civilians.

== Life ==
Darden was born on September 8, 1900, in Brooklyn, New York. He died on June 17, 1961. He is buried at the Fort Rosecrans National Cemetery in San Diego, California.

== Naval career ==
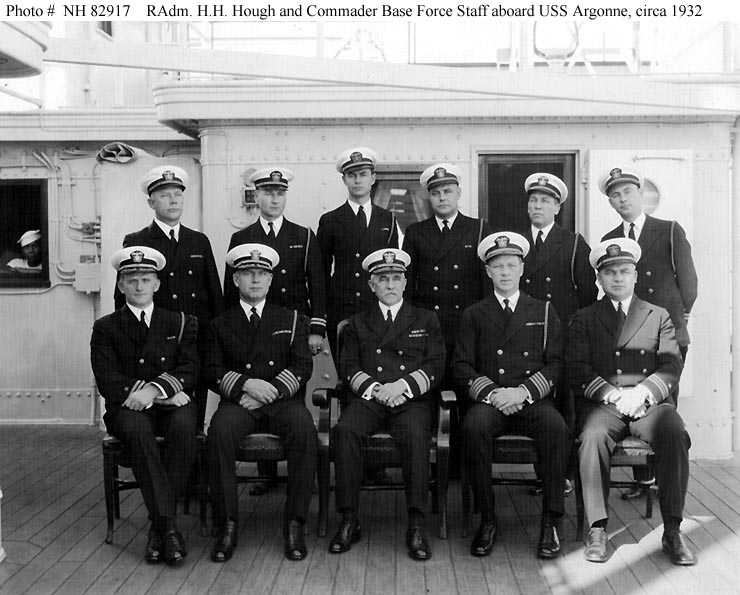
Darden on the staff of Hough; he is in the back.

While he was a lieutenant, Darden served as the aide-de-camp and the flag secretary for Rear Admiral Henry Hughes Hough. For a period of time following World War II, Darden served as an assistant to Chief of Naval Personnel Rear Admiral Thomas L. Sprague.

Darden took command of the destroyer USS Benham (DD-397)on February 2, 1939. Then, during the War in the Pacific,

Darden commanded the light cruiser USS Denver (CL-58).

In the latter 1940s, Darden headed the "Special Programs Unit", a naval unit intended to address the continuing role of African Americans in the U.S. Navy. Darden advocated integrating Black personnel into the U.S. Navy. He and fellow naval officers in the program developed a course to prepare African American enlisted men for promotion to the rank of Chief Petty Officer. Many graduates of this program were given priority promotion, even when specific openings did not exist for them.

== Governorship ==
Darden was the last military governor of American Samoa. Darden took office on July 7, 1949, succeeding Captain Vernon Huber, and he left the office on February 23, 1951, to be succeeded by civilian governors from then on. Darden's primary assignment as the last U.S. Navy Governor was to ensure a smooth and orderly transition from U.S. Navy to Interior administration. Despite President Truman's 1948 order for the transition, there was still significant opposition due to political and economic concerns, including fears of losing land and the matai system. On March 1, 1951, Governor Darden and his wife departed the territory aboard the SS Sonoma.
