= Sanja Tomašević =

Serbian-American volleyball player (born 1980)

Current position
- Title: Head coach
- Team: LOVB Houston

Biographical details
- Born: June 3, 1980 (age 45); Serbia

Playing career
- 1996–1997: (Serbia) OK Jedinstvo Užice
- 1998–2002: (Serbia) Radnički Beograd
- 2002–2005: (United States) University of Washington
- 2005–2006: (Puerto Rico) Vaqueras de Bayamón
- 2007: (South Korea) Suwon Hyundai E&G Green Fox
- 2008: (Switzerland) Volero Zurich
- 2008–2010: (Greece) Panathinaikos
- 2010–2011: (Azerbaijan) VK Baki
- 2011–2012: (Italy) Infotel Forlì
- 2012: (Italy) Pomì Casalmaggior
- Position: Outside hitter/Opposite

Coaching career (HC unless noted)
- 2012–2013: UTSA (Assistant/Recruiting Coordinator)
- 2014–2015: Miami (Assistant)
- 2016: Arizona State (Assistant/Interim HC)
- 2017–2022: Arizona State
- 2023–2025: VakıfBank S.K. (Assistant)
- 2025–: LOVB Houston

Sanja Tomašević (born June 3, 1980) is a Serbian-American volleyball coach and retired player. She is the current head coach of LOVB Houston. She previously served as the head coach of Arizona State women's volleyball team from 2017–2022.

== Personal life ==
Tomašević is a native of Serbia. She obtained her U.S. nationality in March 2021.

== Playing career ==
Tomašević played professional volleyball in Serbia before joining the University of Washington Huskies volleyball team. At the end of her career, she was a two-time All-American and the 2005 Asics and CVU.com National Player of the Year. She led the Huskies to four NCAA tournament appearances, including the 2005 NCAA national championship, and two Pac-10 conference titles. Additionally, she was named the conference Player of the Year in 2005. She ended her collegiate career as Washington's all-time leader in points (2,159.5), kills (1,795) and service aces (156). She is one of only five players in Huskies history to record 1,000 kills and 1,000 digs. She graduated from Washington in 2006 with a degree in communications.

In October 2016, Tomašević became just the second individual volleyball player to be inducted into the Husky Hall of Fame.

Following her playing career at Washington, she played professional volleyball in several countries including Greece, Puerto Rico, Italy, Azerbaijan, and Switzerland.

== Coaching career ==
Tomašević began collegiate coaching at University of Texas-San Antonio in 2012. In her first season as the assistant coach/recruiting coordinator, she helped the Roadrunners to a 21-9 overall record and a 13-5 mark in the Western Athletic Conference. UTSA, which tied for second in the league standings, advanced to the WAC Tournament semifinals.

After spending two season at UTSA, she was named the assistant coach for the Miami Hurricane's women's volleyball team in 2014. She helped the Hurricanes reach the NCAA Tournament for the sixth consecutive season in 2014. The Hurricanes, who finished the season 22-9, reached the second round of the NCAA Tournament before falling to No. 8 Florida in four sets. She was also credited with the development of All-Americans and All-Conference players on the team.

Prior to being named head coach of Arizona State in December 2016, she served as a recruiting coordinator and interim head coach for the team.

Following the conclusion of the 2022 season, Arizona State announced that per mutual agreement, Tomašević stepped down as the head coach.

On June 17, 2025, Tomašević was hired as head coach of the LOVB Houston.

== Head coaching record ==
Statistics overview
Season	Team	Overall	Conference	Standing	Postseason
Arizona State Sun Devils (Pac-12 Conference) (2017–2022)
2017	Arizona State	10–22	0–20	12th	
2018	Arizona State	14–18	5–15	11th	
2019	Arizona State	17–14	9–11	8th	
2020	Arizona State	6–14	6–14	9th	
2021	Arizona State	14–17	7–13	9th	
2022	Arizona State	13–19	7–13	9th	
Arizona State:		74–104 (.416)	34–86 (.283)		
Total:		74–104 (.416)			
National champion Postseason invitational champion Conference regular season champion Conference regular season and conference tournament champion Division regular season champion Division regular season and conference tournament champion Conference tournament champion
