= Matt Tuiasosopo =

American baseball player and coach (born 1986)

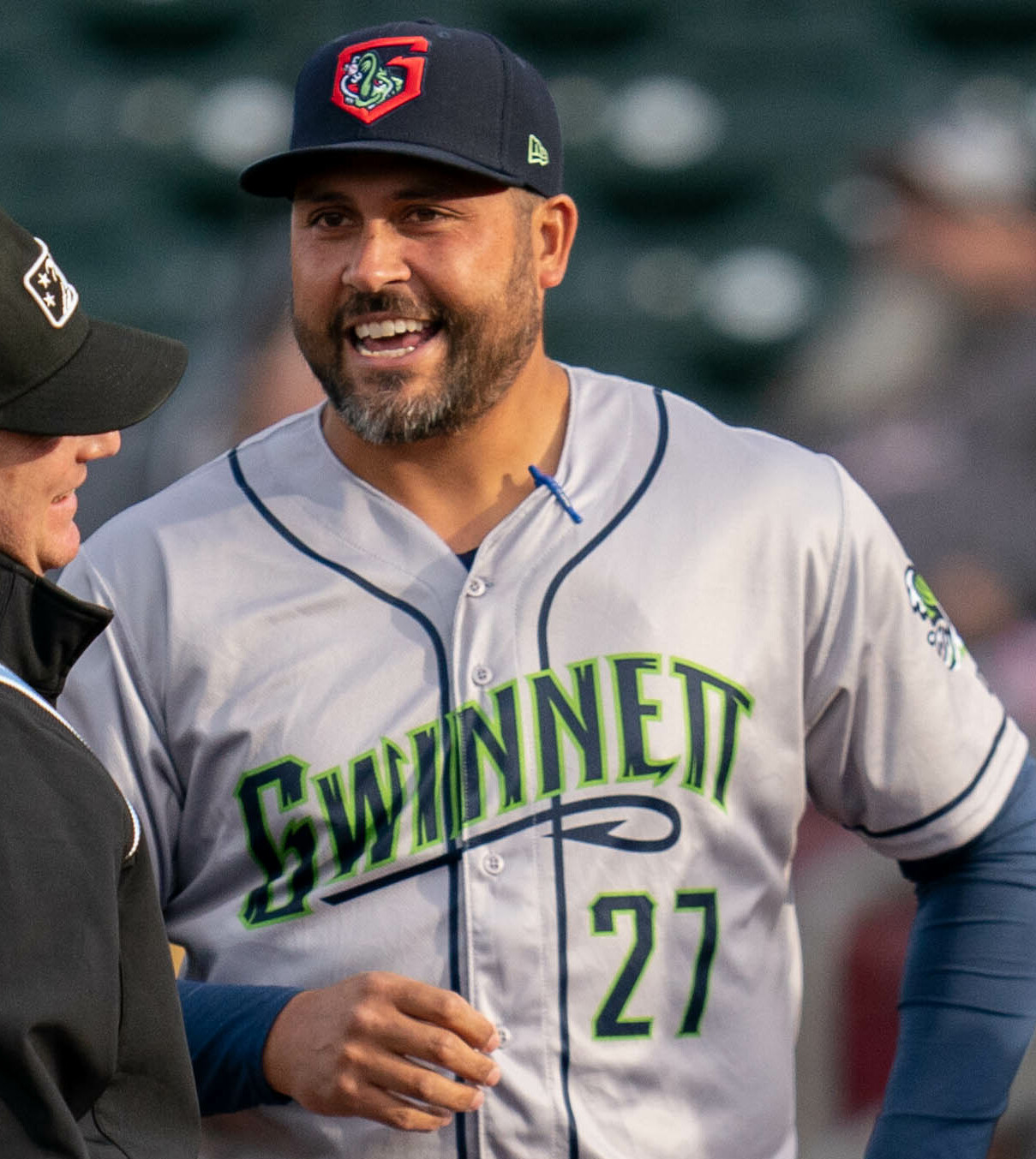
- Tuiasosopo with the Gwinnett Stripers in 2023
- Utility player / Coach
- Born: May 10, 1986 (age 40); Bellevue, Washington, U.S.
- Batted: Right Threw: Right

MLB debut
- September 5, 2008, for the Seattle Mariners

Last MLB appearance
- May 8, 2016, for the Atlanta Braves

MLB statistics
- Batting average: .206
- Home runs: 12
- Runs batted in: 45
- Stats at Baseball Reference

Teams
- As player: Seattle Mariners (2008–2010); Detroit Tigers (2013); Atlanta Braves (2016); As coach: Atlanta Braves (2024–2025)

Matthew Petelu Tuiasosopo (born May 10, 1986) is an American former professional baseball utility player and coach. He played in Major League Baseball (MLB) for the Seattle Mariners, Detroit Tigers, and the Atlanta Braves. He was Atlanta's third base coach in 2024 and part of 2025.

== Early life ==
Tuiasosopo played for the Woodinville West Little League at the 1998 Little League Western Regional Tournament in San Bernardino, California. Woodinville West lost to Cypress Federal in a championship game that lasted 7 innings.

Tuiasosopo attended Woodinville High School, where he played baseball and football. He had a promising football career: he was selected to play in the 2004 U.S. Army All-American Bowl. Before signing as a professional baseball player, he signed a letter of intent to play football at the University of Washington.

== Professional career ==
=== Seattle Mariners ===
==== Minor leagues (2004–2007) ====
The Seattle Mariners drafted Tuiasosopo 93rd overall in the third round in the 2004 Major League Baseball draft. He began his pro career with the Peoria Mariners in 2004, hitting a solo home run in first career-at bat on July 10. Tuiasosopo hit safely in 18 of 20 games and reached base safely in 19 of 20 games. He had a 13-game hit streak, hitting .467 from July 10–25, and tied for the team lead in home runs with four. On August 5, he was promoted to the Everett AquaSox. At the end of the season, he participated in the Arizona Instructional League.

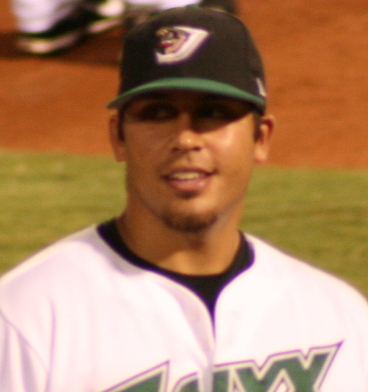
Tuiasosopo with the West Tenn Diamond Jaxx in 2007

In 2005, he was with Seattle's Low-A affiliate, the Wisconsin Timber Rattlers. He hit .276 with three home runs and 45 runs batted in. He was ranked number 36 on Minor League News' annual Fab 50. He recorded a season-high 13-game hitting streak to start the season, batting .423 with eight runs, three doubles, two home runs and 12 RBIs during that time. Tuiasosopo had 27 multi-hit games, three four-hit games and six three-hit games. He hit home runs in back-to-back games on June 9 and 10.

In 2006, he split time between the Mariners' High-A Inland Empire 66ers and Double-A San Antonio Missions affiliates. He batted a combined .248 with two home runs and 44 RBI. He played with the Peoria Javelinas of the Arizona Fall League that fall. He hit .306 with one home run with 34 RBIs, 31 runs scored and five stolen bases in 59 games with Inland Empire but only batted .185 with one home run, 16 runs scored and 10 RBIs with San Antonio.

Tuiasosopo spent the 2007 season with the Double-A West Tenn Diamond Jaxx. He hit .424 with eight runs, five doubles and three RBIs during a season-high 10-game hitting streak from April 5–14. He recorded a double in five consecutive games from April 6-1. He was named to the Southern League All-Star team and later that season played for the Peoria Javelinas in the Arizona Fall League.

After the 2007 season, Tuiasosopo was rated as the Mariners No. 10 prospect by Baseball America.

==== Major leagues (2008–2011) ====
Tuiasosopo began the 2008 season with the Triple-A Tacoma Rainiers. On September 5, 2008, he collected his first major league hit, a double, against pitcher Andy Pettitte of the New York Yankees while playing for the Mariners. He finished the 2008 season batting .281 with Tacoma and .159 with the Mariners.

He made the 2009 Opening Day roster for the Mariners. He had surgery on his right elbow following a late April injury. On July 4, Tuiasosopo made his first rehab start with the AZL Mariners. Tuiasosopo was activated soon after the All-Star break. Tuiasosopo hit two home runs against the Portland Beavers on August 28 helping the Rainiers to their seventh straight victory. He finished the season batting .261 with 11 home runs and 35 RBIs in 59 games for the Rainiers. In four playoff games, he batted .313 with one home run and four RBIs.

On September 13 Tuiasosopo was called up to Seattle after the Rainiers lost in the first round of the playoffs to the Sacramento River Cats. He said this about the playoff experience:

We all knew that if we were in the running, all of us would be here in the playoffs, because we know how important that it was, The organization thinks it's important winning in the Minor Leagues, so we knew that we were going to be around and we just wanted to keep winning. We wanted to see if we could get that ring. That was important to all of us in that room there.

— Matt Tuiasosopo, MLB.com: September 15, 2009.

On September 27, during the pre-game show on 710 ESPN Radio prior to the matchup between the Mariners and the Toronto Blue Jays at the Rogers Centre, color commentator Mike Blowers predicted that Tuiasosopo would hit his first major league home run during this game specifically in his second at bat on a 3-1 fastball from starting pitcher Brian Tallet into the left center field second deck level. This prediction was nearly perfect as Tuiasosopo would end up hitting his first home run in his second at bat on a 3-1 pitch against Tallet out to left field into the first deck.

Tuiasosopo played in 50 games in the majors with Seattle in the 2010 season. He played his first major league games at shortstop, first base, and in the outfield.

Tuiasosopo spent the entire 2011 season with the Triple-A Tacoma Rainiers. He was released on September 1.

=== Detroit Tigers (2013) ===
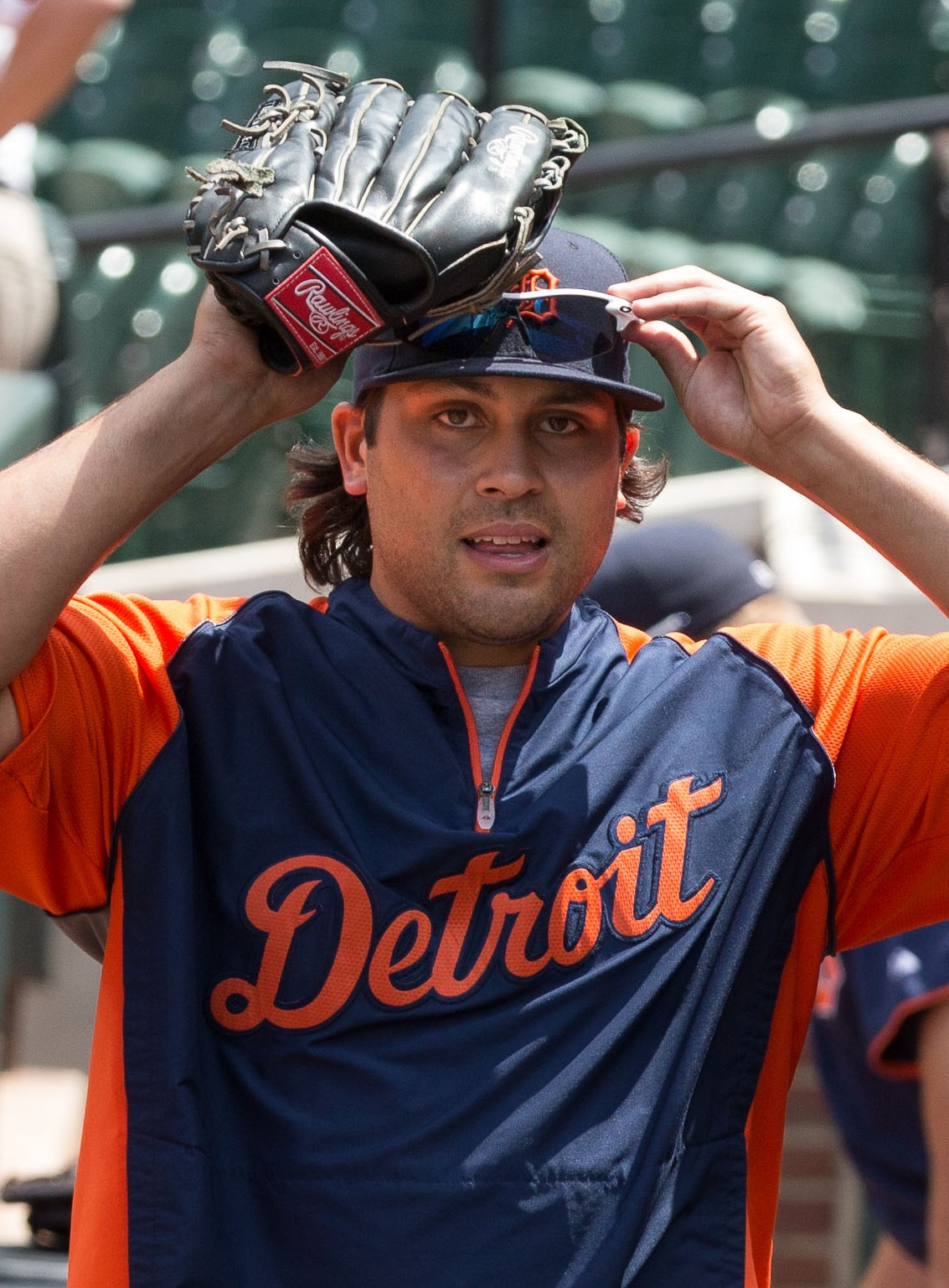
Tuiasosopo with the Detroit Tigers in 2013

Tuiasosopo signed a minor league contract with the New York Mets on January 27, 2012, and spent the season with the Triple-A Buffalo Bisons. Tuiasosopo signed a minor league contract with the Detroit Tigers on November 21, 2012.

On March 26, 2013, citing an impressive spring that saw Tuiasosopo hit .327 with four home runs and 10 RBIs, Tigers manager Jim Leyland announced that Tuiasosopo had made the major league roster. After a good start to the season, Tuiasosopo landed on the 15-day disabled list (DL) on June 21. He returned from the DL on July 5. On the season, Tuiasosopo appeared in 81 games for the Tigers, hitting .244 with 7 home runs and 30 RBIs, all career highs.

=== Later career (2014–2018) ===
In November 2013, the Arizona Diamondbacks claimed Tuiasosopo off waivers. On March 20, 2014, Tuiasosopo was again claimed off waivers, this time by the Toronto Blue Jays. He was assigned outright to the Triple-A Buffalo Bisons on March 28. On June 12, the Blue Jays traded Tuiasosopo to the Chicago White Sox in exchange for cash considerations.

On December 16, 2014, Tuiasosopo signed a minor league contract with the Baltimore Orioles. He was released in March 2015 and returned to the White Sox in April.

On November 24, 2015, Tuiasosopo signed a minor league contract with the Atlanta Braves. In May 2016, Tuiasosopo was promoted to the major leagues by the Braves, making his debut on May 4. He was designated for assignment on May 9 after batting 0-for-3. On October 21, Tuiasosospo re-signed with the Braves on a minor league contract.

Tuiasosopo spent the entire 2017 season in the minors with the Gwinnett Braves of the Triple-A International League, playing in 114 games. On July 20, he made his first career pitching appearance in his 1,243rd minor league game, striking out two batters in a scoreless ninth inning against the Indianapolis Indians at Coolray Field. He elected free agency following the season on November 6, 2017.

On May 21, 2018, Tuiasosopo signed with the New Britain Bees of the independent Atlantic League of Professional Baseball. He retired from professional baseball on August 20.

== Coaching career ==
Tuiasosopo began his coaching career in the Atlanta Braves' minor league system. He was named manager of the Rome Braves for the 2019 season. He won Atlanta's Bobby Cox Award for best Manager in the team's minor league system that season. Before the 2020 minor league season was cancelled due to the COVID-19 pandemic, Tuiasosopo was slated for a return to Rome. Instead, he coached at the Braves' alternate training site. Tuiasosopo was named the manager of the Triple-A Gwinnett Stripers for the 2021 season. He was the first former Stripers player to manage the team. In 2022, Tuiasosopo was selected to the coaching staff of the All-Star Futures Game. He managed the Scottsdale Scorpions of the Arizona Fall League that offseason.

Tuiasosopo was named Atlanta's third base coach on December 11, 2023. He had been the third base coach for three Atlanta games in July 2023, filling in for Ron Washington. On June 2, 2025, Tuiasosopo was removed as third base coach and reassigned as the team's minor league infield coordinator.

== Personal life ==
Tuiasosopo is the younger brother of Marques and Zach Tuiasosopo and the son of Manu Tuiasosopo. His father and brothers played college football in the Pac-10 Conference; Manu at UCLA and his two older brothers at the University of Washington. Both Manu and Marques played in the National Football League, and Marques is now a football coach. Their older sister Leslie Gabriel played volleyball at Washington and is currently the head coach of the Huskies. He is a cousin of Naya Tuiasosopo, the perpetrator of the Manti Te'o catfishing hoax and subject of the documentary Untold: The Girlfriend Who Didn't Exist.

Tuiasosopo is married and has three sons. His brother-in-law is Micah Owings, who had been his housemate during spring training.
