= Vernon Huber =

United States admiral

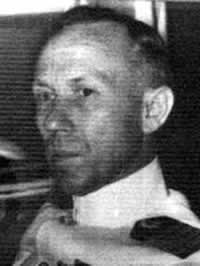

Governor of American Samoa
- In office April 22, 1947 – June 15, 1949
- Preceded by: Harold Houser
- Succeeded by: Thomas Francis Darden Jr.

Personal details
- Born: August 28, 1899 Philadelphia, Illinois, U.S.
- Died: June 17, 1967 (aged 67) El Camino Hospital, Los Altos, California, U.S.
- Spouse: Ida Brown
- Education: United States Naval Academy
- Occupation: Naval officer
- Awards: Legion of Merit; Navy Commendation Medal

Military service
- Allegiance: United States
- Branch/service: United States Navy
- Rank: Rear admiral
- Commands: USS Livermore
- Battles/wars: World War I World War II

Vernon Huber (August 28, 1899 – June 17, 1967) was a United States Navy rear admiral and the governor of American Samoa from April 22, 1947, to June 15, 1949. He was born in Philadelphia, Illinois, and was appointed to the United States Naval Academy from that state. He served as the first commanding officer of the destroyer USS Livermore upon its launch in 1940. After his appointment, he advocated the diversification of the American Samoan economy. He also helped to increase the level American Samoan self-government, and was the first governor to serve alongside a Samoan legislature, the American Samoa Fono.

== Life ==
Huber was born on August 28, 1899, in Philadelphia, Illinois, to parents Herbert Oliver and Nelle Davis Huber. On December 27, 1927, he married Ida Brown. Upon arriving at the El Camino Hospital in Los Altos, California, on June 16, 1967, Huber was pronounced dead.

== Naval career ==
Huber was appointed to the United States Naval Academy on July 17, 1918. He was the first commander of the destroyer USS Livermore upon its launch in 1940.

== Governorship ==
On August 22, 1947, Huber relieved Harold Houser and took the office of Governor of American Samoa. His assistant governor was Ralph Ramey.

Huber supported the opening of a cannery by famed aviator Harold Gatty, believing it would help diversify the American Samoan economy.

During his term, the Samoans moved towards greater self-government. Under Huber's encouragement, the legislature of the territory, the American Samoa Fono, convened for the first time. As governor, Huber maintained certain powers over the legislature, including the power of veto. This reversed the previous position of Governor Otto Dowling, who had claimed an act of the United States Congress would be required to form a legislature. He ceded the office to Thomas Francis Darden Jr. on June 15, 1949.
