= Mary Dwight =

American handball player

Personal information
- Full name: Mary Phyllis Dwight
- Nationality: American
- Born: 3 December 1951 (age 74) Kansas City, Missouri, U.S.

Sport
- Sport: Handball

Mary Phyllis Dwight (born December 3, 1951, in Kansas City, Missouri) is an American former handball player who competed in the 1984 Summer Olympics.

== Early life ==
Mary Phyl Dwight attended Southwest Missouri State and was a multi-sport athlete. Dwight was on the softball, volleyball, basketball, track, and cross country teams.

Dwight was an All-American sprinter for the Missouri State Lady Bears track and field team, finishing 3rd in the 4 × 440 yards relay at the 1973 AIAW Outdoor Track and Field Championships.

== Career ==
=== Handball ===
She was the captain of the US women's handball team, starting in 1974. In 1979, she started to play full time for the national team. Dwight played handball at the 1984 Summer Olympics.

=== Coaching ===
==== Kansas State ====
Dwight started her coaching career at Kansas State.

With the volleyball team she accrued a record of 108-88-4, coaching from 1975 to 1979.

The softball team finished 43-81.

==== University of Iowa ====
Mary Phyl Dwight was a volleyball coach for the University of Iowa Hawkeyes women's volleyball.
