= USS Livermore (DD-429) =

Gleaves-class destroyer

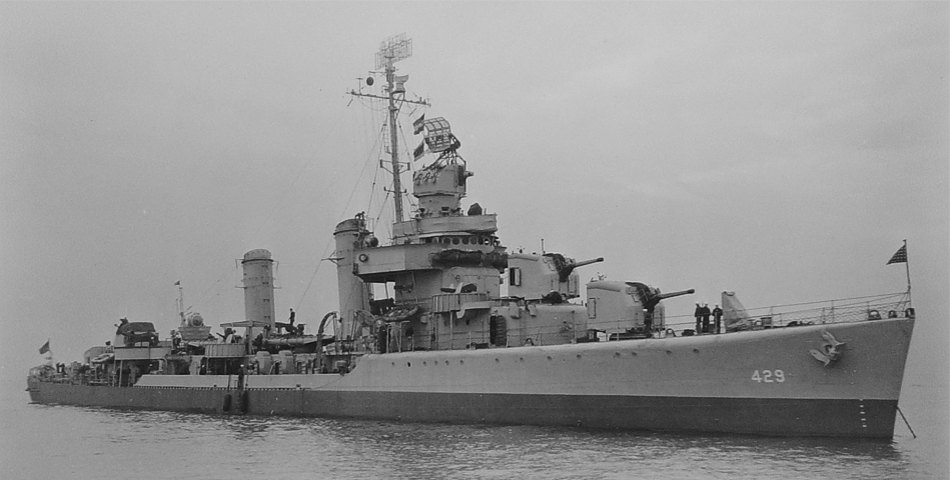
- USS Livermore (DD-429)

History

United States
- Name: Livermore
- Namesake: Samuel Livermore
- Builder: Bath Iron Works
- Laid down: 6 March 1939
- Launched: 3 August 1940
- Commissioned: 7 October 1940
- Decommissioned: 24 January 1947
- Stricken: 19 July 1956
- Identification: Call sign: NUNJ
- Fate: Sold 3 March 1961 for scrapping

General characteristics
- Class & type: Gleaves-class destroyer
- Displacement: 1,630 tons
- Length: 341 ft (104 m) waterline, 348 ft 3 in (106.15 m) overall
- Beam: 36 ft (11 m)
- Draft: 11 ft 9 in (3.58 m), 17 ft 3 in (207 in) full load
- Propulsion: Four Babcock & Wilcox boilers; General Electric SR geared turbines; 2 shafts; 50,000 shp (37,000 kW)
- Speed: 37.5 kn (69.5 km/h; 43.2 mph)
- Range: 6,000 nmi (11,000 km; 6,900 mi) at 15 kn (28 km/h; 17 mph)
- Complement: 16 officers, 260 enlisted (war)
- Armament: 5 × 5 in (130 mm) DP guns, 6 × .50 cal (12.7 mm) guns, 6 × 20 mm AA guns, 10 × 21 in (533 mm) torpedo tubes, 1 × depth charge projector; 2 × depth charge tracks

USS Livermore (DD-429), a Gleaves-class destroyer, was the first ship of the United States Navy to be named for Samuel Livermore, the first naval chaplain to be honored with a ship in his name.

Originally planned as Grayson, DD-429 was renamed Livermore 23 December 1938; laid down 6 March 1939 by Bath Iron Works, Bath, Maine; launched 3 August 1940; sponsored by Mrs. Everard M. Upjohn, a descendant of Chaplain Livermore; and commissioned 7 October 1940, Lieutenant Commander Vernon Huber in command.

== Service history ==
=== Pre World War II ===
Launched in the aftermath of the fall of France, Livermore, after a brief training period, was assigned 29 April 1941 to the neutrality patrol. With ships like the aircraft carrier Wasp and sister destroyers, she escorted as far as Iceland convoys bound for England. There ensued a shadowy undeclared war with Nazi wolfpacks. She was on convoy duty with the destroyer Kearny when the latter was torpedoed on 17 October. The hazards of this duty for Livermore also included a temporary grounding on 24 November during a storm and having a friendly battery on Iceland fire across the ship.

=== 1942 ===
The attack on Pearl Harbor and full U.S. participation in World War II enlarged the scope of her actions. On 7 April 1942 Livermore departed New York for the first of many transatlantic escort missions. Completing her second voyage to Greenock, Scotland on 27 June, she began coastal patrol and convoy duty southward into the Caribbean.

Livermore arrived off Mehdia, French Morocco, 9 November for the north African invasion and was assigned antisubmarine, antiaircraft, and fire support duties. Five days later, the invasion force successfully established ashore, she sailed for Norfolk, arriving 26 November.

=== 1943-1944 ===
The year 1943 began with patrol duty off Recife, Brazil, and concluded with a series of five voyages from 14 April to 17 January 1944 between New York and Casablanca, French Morocco. Her departure from Hampton Roads on 24 January foreshadowed a prolonged stay in the Mediterranean Sea. Two days earlier Allied forces had landed at Anzio, Italy. Livermore arrived off this embattled beachhead on 5 March. She provided both antiaircraft protection and shore bombardment support. After rotation to the convoy run between Oran, Algeria, and Naples, Italy, she participated in the initial landing in southern France on 16 August. While supporting minesweepers on Cavallaire Bay with gunfire, Livermore was hit by a shore battery. The damage was slight, and her guns silenced the enemy guns. Livermore continued on duty in the western Mediterranean until 26 October when she steamed out of Oran for overhaul in New York Navy Yard.

=== Convoys escorted ===
Convoy	Escort Group	Dates	Notes
HX 151		24 Sept-1 Oct 1941	from Newfoundland to Iceland prior to US declaration of war
ON 24		13-15 Oct 1941	from Iceland to Newfoundland prior to US declaration of war
SC 48		16-17 Oct 1941	battle reinforcement prior to US declaration of war
HX 159		10-19 Nov 1941	from Newfoundland to Iceland prior to US declaration of war
ON 39		29 Nov-4 Dec 1941	from Iceland to Newfoundland prior to US declaration of war
AT 18		6-17 Aug 1942	troopships from New York City to Firth of Clyde

=== End of World War II and fate ===
The war ended in Europe while Livermore was on the third of a new series of escort crossings between the east coast and Oran. Completing her last transatlantic voyage 29 May, she prepared for duty in the Pacific.

Though she departed New York on 22 June, V-J Day found her still training at Pearl Harbor. She reached Japan on 27 September escorting transports carrying soldiers of the Army's 98th Division for occupation duty. Her stay in the Orient was relatively brief; for, after several voyages between Saipan, the Philippines, and Wakayama, Japan, Livermore sailed 3 November for the Aleutians. At Dutch Harbor and Attu Island, Alaska, she embarked dischargees for passage to Seattle and San Francisco. Completing this duty 22 December 1945, she proceeded to the east coast, arriving at Charleston, South Carolina on 18 January 1946.

Designated for use in the Naval Reserve Training Program, she was placed in commission, in reserve 1 May 1946. Livermore then decommissioned and was placed "in service" 24 January 1947, and was assigned to Naval Reserve training in the 6th Naval District. She was reassigned to the 1st Naval District on 15 March 1949. While making one of her training cruises. she ran aground off southern Cape Cod on 30 July 1949. Refloated the next day she proceeded to Boston and was placed out of service 15 May 1950 and inactivated. She was struck from the Naval Vessel Register on 19 July 1956. From 1956 to late 1958, her hull was used for spare parts and experimental purposes. During this time, she was anchored off Indianhead, Maryland. Upon conclusion of the experiments Livermore was sold 3 March 1961 to Potomac Shipwrecking Co., Pope's Creek, Maryland. She was towed away for scrapping 17 April 1961.

Livermore received three battle stars for World War II service.
