= Leslie Gabriel =

American volleyball coach (born 1977)

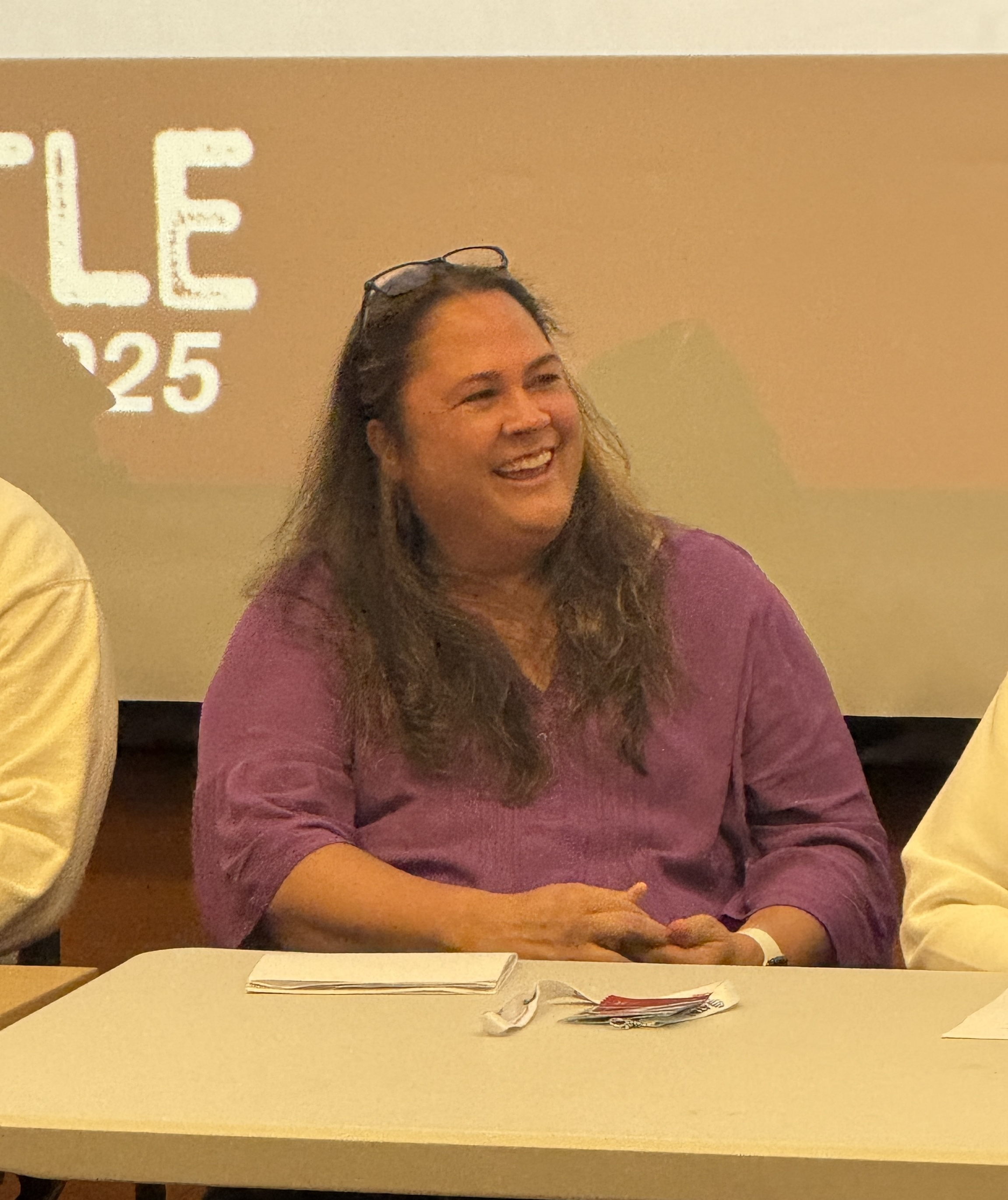
- Gabriel in 2025

Current position
- Title: Head coach
- Team: Washington
- Conference: Big Ten
- Record: 67–53 (.558)
- Annual salary: $187,000.00

Biographical details
- Born: August 2, 1977 (age 49); Woodinville, Washington, U.S.
- Education: Washington

Coaching career (HC unless noted)
- 2001–2022: Washington (assistant)
- 2023–present: Washington

Leslie Gabriel (née Tuiasosopo) (born August 2, 1977) is the head women's volleyball coach at the University of Washington.

From 2001 to 2022, she served as associate head coach and recruiting coordinator for Washington's women's volleyball team. In addition to assisting head coaches Jim McLaughlin and Keegan Cook with all administrative responsibilities, Gabriel worked with the team's setters and defense.

Gabriel was four-year letterwinner who started for the Huskies from 1995 to 1998.

== Early life ==
Raised in Woodinville, east of Seattle, she helped Woodinville High School to back-to-back Class AAA (now 4A) state volleyball tournament appearances as a sophomore and junior and one trip to the state basketball tournament before dropping the sport as a sophomore. In 1995, the three-time All-KingCo volleyball pick was the state's top volleyball recruit by her senior year, and considered one of the top recruits in the country.

== College career ==
Gabriel, along with All-American Makare Desilets, formed one of the nation's best blocking tandems, leading the Huskies to the top of the NCAA blocking rankings in 1997. A Pac-10 first-team selection as a junior, Gabriel ranks in the UW career top-10 in five categories, including total blocks (second - 613) and block assists (second - 520). She also ranked in the top-25 nationally in blocks per game in each of her four seasons at Washington.

After completing her eligibility in 1998, Gabriel trained with the United States women's national volleyball team program and was selected to participate at the 1999 Universiade (also known as the World University Games) in Spain.

She returned to Washington to complete her degree and graduated in 2000 with a Bachelor of Psychology degree and a minor in speech communications.

From August 2000 until May 2001, Gabriel played professional volleyball in Murcia, Spain.

== Coaching career ==
=== Since 2001: Washington ===
Gabriel started as the associate head coach in 2001, first alongside McLaughlin and then Cook. In December 2022, the UW announced that Gabriel would take over as head coach of the program, which boasts 21 years of consecutive NCAA tournament appearances.

During her tenure as a coach at the University of Washington, she played a key role in developing Washington's setters, which ranked among the nation's elite during Gabriel and McLaughlin's tenure. In 2006, Gabriel helped guide senior setter Courtney Thompson to one of the best individual seasons in Husky history. Thompson was named First Team All-America by both the American Volleyball Coaches Association (AVCA) and Volleyball Magazine. In addition, she was named the CVU.com (Collegiate Volleyball Update) National Setter of the Year, and was a finalist for the Honda Award after winning the award in 2005. In 2008, Jenna Hagglund led the Pac-10 and ranked second in the nation in assists per set with 12.17, and finished her career as a two-time AVCA All-American, and was 10th in Pac-10 history in career assists.

Gabriel also aided in the development of Tamari Miyashiro (2006–09) into the top libero in the nation. Miyashiro was twice named the Volleyball Magazine National Defender of the Year in 2007 and 2008, and was a three-time AVCA All-American from 2007-09. She set the school digs record with 2,382 which ranks her ninth in NCAA history.

Prior to the 2006 season, Gabriel worked with the team's middle blockers.

== Personal life ==
She was born Leslie Tuiasosopo, a daughter of former NFL defensive lineman, Manu Tuiasosopo, who played collegiately at UCLA, then professionally from 1979 to 1986 for the Seattle Seahawks and San Francisco 49ers, being a starter at nose tackle and winning Super Bowl XIX. She is the oldest of five children, including former UW starting quarterback Marques Tuiasosopo.

She married Anthony Gabriel, an academic advisor at the University of Washington, in the summer of 2010, and has three children, Daylon, Myles, and Lanea.

== Head coaching record ==
Record table
Season	Team	Overall	Conference	Standing	Postseason
Washington Huskies (Pac-12) (2023)
2023	Washington	16–15	7–13	8th	
Washington Huskies (Big Ten) (2024–present)
2024	Washington	19–12	9–11	9th	NCAA first round
2025	Washington	13–17	8–12	T–10th	
2026	Washington	19–9	9–8	T–8th	
Washington:		67–53 (.558)	33–44 (.429)		
Total:		67–53 (.558)			

== See also ==
- List of University of Washington people
