= Kara Bajema =

American volleyball player (born 1998)

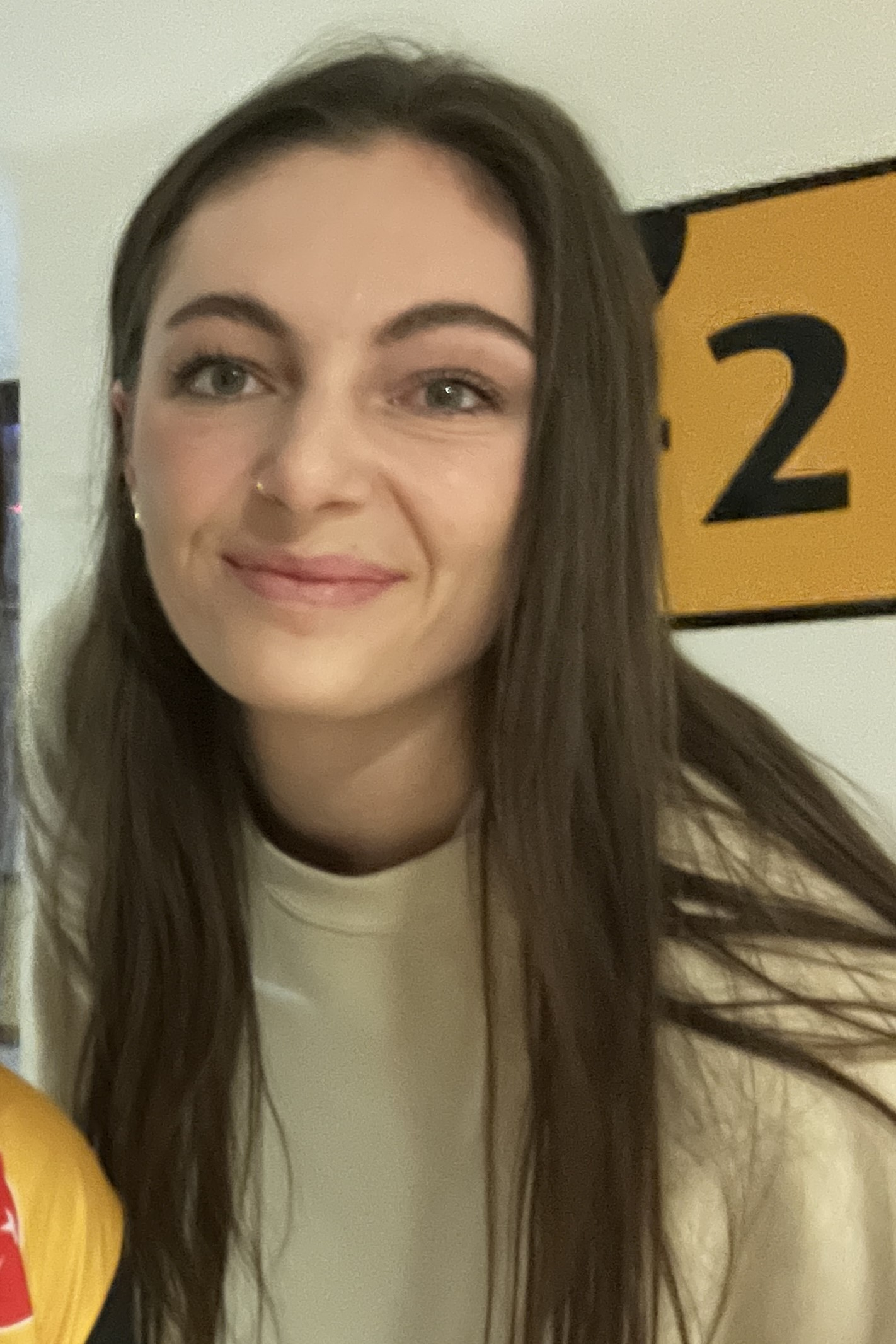
- Bajema in 2023

Personal information
- Full name: Kara Jane Bajema
- Nationality: United States
- Born: March 24, 1998 (age 28); Bellingham, Washington, U.S.
- Hometown: Lynden, Washington
- Height: 188 cm (6 ft 2 in)
- Education: Washington

Volleyball information
- Position: Outside Hitter
- Current club: (United States) LOVB

Career
Years	Teams
2016–2019	(United States) Washington
2020–2021	(Italy) Casalmaggiore
2021–2022	(Poland) KS DevelopRes Bella Dolina Rzeszów
2022–2023	(Turkey) VakıfBank S.K.
2023–2024	(Italy) Vero Volley Milano
2024	(Indonesia) Jakarta BIN
2024–2025	(Italy) Savino del Bene Scandicci
2025–2026	(Turkey) Goztepe S.K
2027-	(United States) LOVB

National team
2022–	United States

Kara Jane Bajema (born March 24, 1998) is an American professional volleyball player who plays as an outside hitter for the United States women's national volleyball team and Turkish professional club VakıfBank S.K.

== Personal life ==
Bajema was born in Bellingham, Washington to parents Shane and Beth. She spent a few of her early years in Michigan before her family relocated back to Washington. She played soccer until seventh grade before moving on to basketball and volleyball. She has two siblings who are also athletes: an older sister who played soccer at the University of South Carolina, and a brother who plays basketball.

She attended Lynden Christian high school. She was a top 100 national volleyball recruit in her high school class and was a MaxPreps First Team All-American in 2015. She played both volleyball and basketball and led her high school to multiple state titles, earning MVP honors in both sports.

== Career ==
=== College ===
Bajema, a standout multi-sport athlete in basketball and volleyball, chose to focus on volleyball for the remainder of her career. She was recruited as a middle blocker when she chose to play for the University of Washington, but transitioned to outside hitter before the start of her sophomore season. She played both indoor and beach volleyball for Washington. As a junior in 2018 during her indoor career, her first season as a six-rotation outside hitter, she led the team with 475 kills and 533.5 points, which was the ninth-most in a single season and also the most since 2014. She was named a Third-Team All-American. As a senior in 2019, she broke a 17-year-old school record for most kills in a season with 597, averaging 4.63 per set, and earned First Team All-American honors. She finished her collegiate career ranked sixth in school history with 1,482 kills.

Bajema graduated from Washington in 2020 with a degree in education, Communities, and Organization.

=== Professional clubs ===
- (Italy) Casalmaggiore (2020–2021)
- (Poland) KS DevelopRes Bella Dolina Rzeszów (2021–2022)
- (Turkey) VakıfBank S.K. (2022–2023)
- (Italy) Vero Volley Milano (2023–2024)
- (Indonesia) Jakarta BIN (2024–2023)
- (Italy) Savino del Bene Scandicci (2024–)

=== USA National Team ===
In May 2022, Bajema made her national team debut when she was named to the 25-player roster for the 2022 FIVB Volleyball Nations League tournament.

== Awards and honors ==
=== Individual ===
- 2021–2022 Polish Cup – Most Valuable Player, with KS DevelopRes Bella Dolina Rzeszów
- 2024 Indonesian Women's Proliga – Best Blocker, with Jakarta BIN

=== Clubs ===
- 2021–2022 TAURON Liga – Silver medal, with KS DevelopRes Bella Dolina Rzeszów.
- 2021–2022 Polish Cup Champion, with KS DevelopRes Bella Dolina Rzeszów.
- 2024 Indonesian Women's Proliga Champion, with Jakarta BIN.

=== College ===
- AVCA First Team All-American (2019)
- 2019-20 Tom Hansen Medal Winner
- AVCA Pacific North Region Player of the Year (2019)
- AVCA Third Team All-American (2018)
- Pac-12 All-Freshman Team (2016)
