= Joseph T. Flynn =

American politician

Joseph T. Flynn (August 24, 1894 – November 26, 1935) was an American lawyer and politician from New York.

== Life ==
Flynn was born on August 24, 1894, in New York City, New York in Greenwich Village.

Flynn studied at public and parochial schools, La Salle Academy, Fordham Law School, and the Massachusetts Institute of Technology, studying military aeronautics in the latter school. In 1916, he served with the 69th Regiment at the Mexican border. In 1917, during World War I, he sailed for France. He was then sent to Foggia, Italy, resuming air training in a camp surpervised by future New York City Mayor Fiorello La Guardia, at the time a captain. He then returned to France and was assigned to the 28th Squadron of the Second Pursuit Group. He saw service in the front. On Armistice Day, his plane was shot down near the American lines. He was rescued unharmed and informed the armistice was declared. He held the rank of First Lieutenant in the American Air Service, Flying Officer.

In 1922, Flynn was elected to the New York State Assembly as a Democrat, representing the New York County 10th District. He served in the Assembly in 1923. He was in the Assembly with future Postmaster General James A. Farley. He lost re-election that year to Republican Phelps Phelps. In 1923, he was admitted to the bar. Two years later, he was appointed Assistant Corporation Counsel. He held the position until 1934, at which point he resumed his law practice.

Flynn was a member of the American Legion. He had a wife and three daughters.

Flynn died at home from a heart attack on November 26, 1935. He was buried in Gate of Heaven Cemetery. La Guardia and James A. Farley attended the funeral.

New York State Assembly
Preceded by Bernard Aronson	New York State Assembly; New York County, 10th District; 1923	Succeeded by Phelps Phelps
