= Manu Tuiasosopo =

American football player (born 1957)

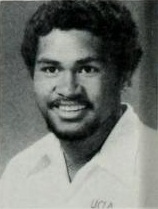
- Tuiasosopo circa 1977

No. 74, 78
- Position: Defensive tackle

Personal information
- Born: August 30, 1957 (age 69); Los Angeles, California, U.S.
- Listed height: 6 ft 3 in (1.91 m)
- Listed weight: 255 lb (116 kg)

Career information
- High school: St. Anthony (Long Beach, California)
- College: UCLA
- NFL draft: 1979: 1st round, 18th overall pick

Career history
- Seattle Seahawks (1979–1983); San Francisco 49ers (1984–1986)

Awards and highlights
- Super Bowl champion (XIX); PFWA All-Rookie Team (1979); 2× Second-team All-American (1977, 1978); 3× First-team All-Pac-10 (1976, 1977, 1978)

Career NFL statistics
- Sacks: 27
- Fumble recoveries: 7
- Interceptions: 1
- Stats at Pro Football Reference

Manu'ula Asovalu Tuiasosopo (born August 30, 1957) is an American former professional football player who was a defensive tackle in the National Football League (NFL) for eight seasons. He played college football at UCLA and was the 18th overall pick of the 1979 NFL draft, selected by the Seattle Seahawks.

In his fifth and final season in Seattle in 1983, the Seahawks made their first-ever postseason appearance and won two playoff games. They advanced to the AFC Championship, on the road against the Los Angeles Raiders, a divisional rival whom Seattle had swept during the regular season; the Raiders won 30–14.

Tuiasosopo was traded in April 1984 (for two draft choices) to the San Francisco 49ers, who won Super Bowl XIX in January 1985. He played with the 49ers for three years, through the 1986 season.

== Post-football ==
Tuiasosopo was last employed by the Alaska Airlines cargo department in Seattle. He currently coaches the defensive line for Monroe High School in Monroe, Washington.

== Personal life ==
Tuiasosopo is the father of former NFL quarterback, Marques, and running back, Zach. His son Matt was a utility player in Major League Baseball and is the former third base coach of the Atlanta Braves. He also has two daughters, Leslie, the University of Washington volleyball coach, and Ashley, who played outfield for the University of Washington softball team that won the 2009 NCAA Women's College World Series.

His cousins are actor Navy, also a former football player, and Mike, a defensive coach at Kansas State University. Mike is the father of Lanea, who won Scholar-Athlete of the Year in 2019 at UCLA for her athletic performance on the women's crew team.
