= Hugh McCutcheon =

New Zealand-American volleyball player and coach

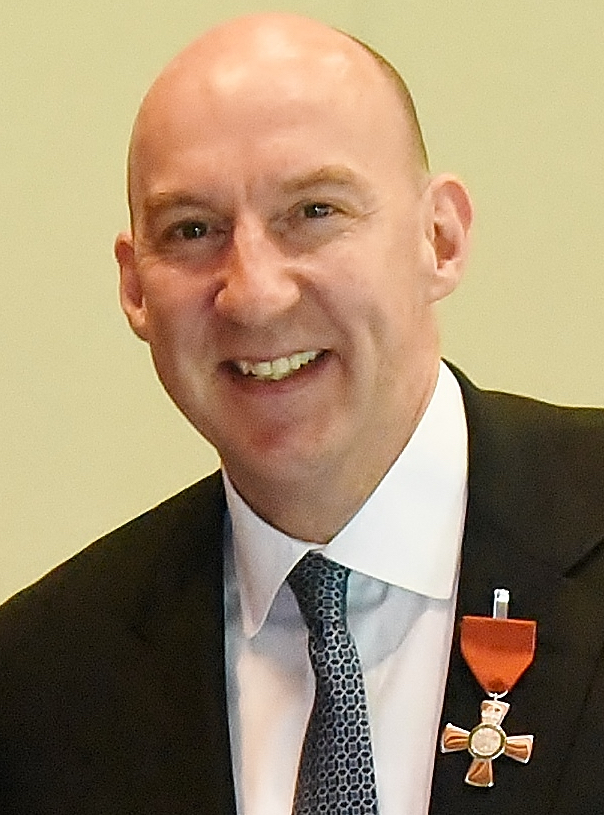
- McCutcheon in 2017

Current position
- Title: Assistant AD / Sport Development Coach
- Team: Minnesota Golden Gophers Athletics Department
- Conference: Big Ten
- Record: 277–74 (.789)

Biographical details
- Born: 13 October 1969 (age 57); Christchurch, New Zealand
- Education: BYU

Playing career
- 1991-1993: BYU
- 1988-1990: New Zealand National Team
- 1996: New Zealand National Team
- 1997: FIVB Beach Volleyball World Tour New Zealand National Team

Coaching career (HC unless noted)
- 1995-2001: BYU (asst.)
- 2001-2002: Vienna Hotvolleys
- 2012-2022: Minnesota

National
- 2000-2001: USA Boys Youth National Team
- 2001-2002: USA Men's (Volunteer asst.)
- 2003-2005: USA Men's (asst.)
- 2005-2008: USA Men's
- 2008-2012: USA Women's

Administrative career (AD unless noted)
- 2024-present: Fédération Internationale de Volleyball (Secretary General)

Head coaching record
- Overall: College: 277–74 (.789) Men's National Team: 107–33 (.764) Women's National Team: 106–39 (.731)

Accomplishments and honors

Championships
- 2x Big Ten Champions (2015, 2018); 3x NCAA Final Four Appearances (2015, 2016, 2019); Austrian Cup (2002); Austrian League Championships (2002)

Awards
- As a Player: Honorable Mention All-American (1993); Academic All-Conference (1992); As a Coach: AVCA National Coach of the Year (2015); 2x Big Ten Coach of the Year (2015, 2018); AVCA North Region Coach of the Year (2013, 2015); International Volleyball Hall of Fame (2018); USOC National Coach of the Year (2008); All-Time Great Coach Award (2013); Jim Coleman Award (2007)
Medal record
Head Coach for Women's Volleyball
Representing the United States
Olympic Games
Silver medal – second place	2012 London	Team
Head Coach for Women's Volleyball FIVB World Grand Prix
Gold medal – first place	2010 Ningbo
Gold medal – first place	2011 Macau
Gold medal – first place	2012 Ningbo
Head Coach for Women's Volleyball Pan-American Cup
Bronze medal – third place	2010 Rosarito/Tijuana
Bronze medal – third place	2011 Chihuahua/Mexicali
Head Coach for Men's Volleyball
Representing the United States
Olympic Games
Gold medal – first place	2008 Beijing	Team
Head Coach for Men's Volleyball World Grand Champions Cup
Silver medal – second place	2005 Japan
Head Coach for Men's Volleyball World League
Gold medal – first place	2008 Rio de Janeiro
Bronze medal – third place	2007 Katowice
Head Coach for Men's Volleyball America Cup
Gold medal – first place	2005 São Leopoldo
Gold medal – first place	2007 Manaus

Hugh Donald McCutcheon MNZM (born 13 October 1969), a native of Christchurch, New Zealand, is a former volleyball coach. He previously coached the US men's and women's national volleyball team, and was the head coach for the University of Minnesota's women's volleyball team from 2012 to 2022. Starting in January 2023, McCutcheon is the assistant athletics director/sport development coach at Minnesota, after announcing his resignation from the volleyball team at the conclusion of the 2022 season.

McCutcheon was a New Zealand national team volleyball player. He played on the New Zealand junior and senior national teams from 1988 to 1990 before coming to the United States and lettered in volleyball and field hockey at Shirley Boys' High School. He was also a member of New Zealand's national team in 1996 and represented his country on the FIVB Beach Volleyball World Tour in 1997. He was inducted into the Volleyball Hall of Fame in 2018.

In June 2023, McCutcheon joined the Fédération Internationale de Volleyball (FIVB) as a Senior Advisor. In this role, he supported the senior FIVB leadership in work aimed at furthering the global growth of the sport. He was selected as Secretary General of FIVB during its 39th World Congress in Porto, Portugal in November 2024.

== College ==
McCutcheon played for Brigham Young University from 1991 to 1993 after transferring from the University of Canterbury in New Zealand.

After receiving his bachelor's degree in physical education from BYU in 1993, McCutcheon played professionally for two years in Finland and Japan before returning to BYU to complete his master's degree in exercise science in 1998. In 1999, McCutcheon received an MBA from BYU's Marriott School of Management.

== Coaching history ==
McCutcheon was the top assistant coach and recruiter under head coach Carl McGown for BYU from 1995 to 2001. During that time, the Cougars posted a record of 138-44 and captured two NCAA men's volleyball championships (1999 and 2001).

After leaving BYU, McCutcheon was the head coach of the Vienna Hotvolleys in Austria for two seasons. In his first season there, the Hotvolleys won the 2001-02 Inter-Liga, Austrian Cup and Austrian League championships, and he had the opportunity to work with USA national team players Rich Lambourne, Dave McKienzie, Adam Naeve, Reid Priddy and Brandon Taliaferro.

McCutcheon also served as a volunteer assistant coach for the men's national team, helping out during the 2001 Volleyball World League, the 2002 World Championships and on five international tours. He has also served as the head coach of the USA Boys Youth National Team in 2000 and 2001. He joined USA Volleyball as a full-time assistant coach for the men's national team program in April 2003.

On 3 February 2005, USA Volleyball introduced McCutcheon as the new head coach of the USA men's national volleyball team. He took over the position from long-time head coach Doug Beal, who resigned from his coaching duties to become the new chief executive officer of USA Volleyball. McCutcheon's team went on to win USA's first ever FIVB World League title in 2008 and finished the quadrennial as 2008 Olympic Champions.

On 15 December 2008, it was announced that McCutcheon accepted the head coach position of the U.S. Women's National Team for the 2009-2012 Olympic quadrennial. The team went on to win the FIVB Grand Prix in 2010, 2011 and 2012 and finished the quadrennial as Olympic Silver medalists.

On 10 February 2011, McCutcheon was named head coach of the University of Minnesota's volleyball team. He joined the Gophers on 30 August 2012 after fulfilling his obligations with the National Team.

On 10 October 2022, University of Minnesota Director of Athletics Mark Coyle announced that Hugh McCutcheon will transition to a newly create role of Assistant Athletic Director/Sport Development Coach effective on 1 January 2023. Under his coaching, the team had the highest winning percentage in Gopher's volleyball history (277-74, 78.9%), eight consecutive Sweet 16s or better, three Final Fours, 6 B1G players of the year, one National Player of the year and 26 All-Americans.

== US Men's National Team head coach ==
The team went 27–6 in McCutcheon's first year as head coach and won five medals in five tournaments. They earned a silver medal at the USOC International Sports Invitational in San Diego, California, gold medals at the America's Cup in Brazil, the FIVB World Championship Qualifying Tournament in Puerto Rico and the NORCECA Continental Championship in Canada and another silver medal at the FIVB World Grand Champions Cup in Japan.

The squad posted wins over the 2004 Olympic gold and silver medalists during the year (Brazil and Italy, respectively), registered the highest winning percentage of any men's national team since 1988 (.818) and recorded the most wins by a men's team since 2000 (27). The Americans finished the year by winning 18 of their last 19 matches, including 14-straight at one point and ranked fifth in the world.

In 2008, the US men's national team led by McCutcheon won the Volleyball World League. He led the USA men's volleyball team to the gold medal at the 2008 Summer Olympics in Beijing for the first time since 1988, defeating gold-medal favorite Brazil in four sets. This is the third gold medal overall for the men's volleyball team with the first being won in 1984.

== US Women's National Team head coach ==
After his Gold Medal win in 2008, McCutcheon sought the "really wonderful challenge" of "acquiring a different skill set" by coaching in the women's game. From 2009 to 2012, McCutcheon served as the head coach of the United States Women's National Volleyball Team.

The team won the FIVB World Grand Prix in 2010, 2011, and 2012, defeating Brazil in the final each year. They were ranked #1 in the world in both 2011 and 2012, and McCutcheon was named USOC Volleyball Coach of the Year in 2010 and 2011.

At the 2012 Olympics, the USA Women's Team advanced to the gold medal game. However, they lost to Brazil in four sets, winning the Silver Medal.

During his tenure as coach, McCutcheon recruited Karch Kiraly to serve as his assistant and then supported his promotion to Head Coach upon McCutcheon's departure to Minnesota. This switch occurred after the 2012 Olympics. Kiraly led the US Women's Team to its first-ever Gold Medal at the belated 2020 Summer Olympics, held in Japan in 2021 following delays related to the COVID-19 pandemic.

== Head coaching record ==
Record table
Season	Team	Overall	Conference	Standing	Postseason
Minnesota Golden Gophers (Big Ten Conference) (2012–2022)
2012	Minnesota	27–8	15–5	T–2nd	NCAA Regional Final
2013	Minnesota	29–7	15–5	3rd	NCAA regional semifinal
2014	Minnesota	19–12	9–11	8th	
2015	Minnesota	30–5	18–2	1st	NCAA National semifinal
2016	Minnesota	29–5	17–3	T–2nd	NCAA National semifinal
2017	Minnesota	28–6	15–5	3rd	NCAA regional semifinal
2018	Minnesota	27–4	19–1	1st	NCAA regional semifinal
2019	Minnesota	27–6	17–3	T–2nd	NCAA National semifinal
2020	Minnesota	16–3	15–2	2nd	NCAA regional semifinal
2021	Minnesota	23–9	15–5	T–3rd	NCAA Regional Final
2022	Minnesota	22–9	15–5	T–3rd	NCAA regional semifinal
Minnesota:		277–74 (.789)	170–47 (.783)		
Total:		277–74 (.789)			
National champion Postseason invitational champion Conference regular season champion Conference regular season and conference tournament champion Division regular season champion Division regular season and conference tournament champion Conference tournament champion

== Publications ==
McCutcheon is the author of the book Championship Behaviors: A Model For Competitive Excellence In Sports, with a foreword by American baseball general manager Thad Levine and published by Triumph Books on November 15, 2022.

The book proposes a framework of holistic athlete development, pulling ideas from neuroscience, motor learning, and psychology. It "questions the notion of the all-powerful coach, debunks antiquated ideas around gender, discusses how to handle disruptive players with empathy, zeros in on the mental and physical health of players and emphasizes the incredible learning opportunities that stem from failure."

== Philosophy ==
McCutcheon propounds a coaching philosophy that foregrounds an athlete and team-focused approach with a clear-eyed view of the difficulties of achieving mastery in sport, values he learned while growing up in New Zealand, combined with his experiences living, studying, and working in the US. In writing and speaking about youth sports, McCutcheon emphasizes that parents, coaches, and players themselves should think about how skills learned in sport can apply to other areas of life, as the odds of embarking on a successful sporting career for any given youth athlete are vanishingly small.

McCutcheon strives to focus on the growth and development of his players not just as athletes, but as people. The Minnesota Star Tribune summarized the key message of Championship Behaviors, and by extension McCutcheon's overall coaching philosophy, in this way: "Growth is deeply personal, and our traditional ideas of success are fleeting. So we should not shy away from the difficulty of trying to improve ourselves, because in that arena we can find a life well-lived."

On July 21, 2021, McCutcheon delivered a talk at TEDxFargo on 'Championship Behaviors,' that spoke more broadly to the role of sport in society.

== Personal life ==
On 9 August 2008, the day after the opening ceremony of the Beijing Summer Olympics, the parents of McCutcheon's wife, former Olympian Elisabeth Bachman, were attacked at Drum Tower. His father-in-law Todd Bachman was killed and his mother-in-law Barbara Bachman was seriously injured. A 47-year-old Chinese man named Tang Yongming assaulted them at the Drum Tower eight kilometres from the main Olympic site before leaping to his death from the 40-metre high balcony. McCutcheon was away from the team for 3 matches during the tournament, before returning to lead the team to the gold medal.

== Individual awards and honours ==
- 2007 NORCECA Men's Championship "Best Coach"
- 2011 NORCECA Women's Championship "Eugenio Laffita Award"
- 2015 Big Ten Coach of the Year
- 2015 AVCA Coach of the Year

In the 2016 Queen's Birthday Honours, McCutcheon was appointed a Member of the New Zealand Order of Merit for services to volleyball.

Preceded by (China) Lang Ping	United States women's national volleyball team coach 2008-2012	Succeeded by (United States) Karch Kiraly
