= James Arthur Ewing =

American politician (1916–1996)

James Arthur Ewing (October 1, 1916 – February 16, 1996) was an American politician who was the governor of American Samoa. He took the office on November 28, 1952 and resigned just over four months later, on March 4, 1953. He was appointed by President Harry S. Truman to maintain order and prepare for the transition to Republican administration after the Democrats lost the presidential election of 1952.

== Biography ==
Ewing was born in Boardman, Ohio on October 1, 1916, and later lived in Youngstown. Prior to his appointment, Ewing was an executive with an Ohio steel company.

In July 1956, his wife, former model Bernice Ewing, sued him for divorce on grounds of extreme cruelty. A year later, a judge increased the payments but it was stated Ewing's whereabouts were unknown; he had last been heard from in Fiji in January of that year, when payments abruptly stopped. At the time of his father's death in 1961, Ewing was residing in Capri, Italy. He later returned to Fiji, and died in Ingleburn, New South Wales, Australia on February 16, 1996, at the age of 79.
