= Jim McLaughlin (coach) =

American volleyball coach (born 1960)

- McLaughlin in 2006

Personal information
- Born: November 18, 1960 (age 65); Malibu, California, U.S.
- Hometown: Malibu, California U.S.
- Education: UC Santa Barbara

Coaching information
Previous teams coached
Years	Teams
1986–1989; 1990–1996; 1996; 1997–2000; 2001–2014; 2015–2017	Pepperdine (men's asst.); USC (men's HC); Notre Dame (women's asst.); Kansas State (women's HC); Washington (women's HC); Notre Dame (women's HC)
- Last updated: December 4, 2018

Jim McLaughlin (born November 18, 1960) is an American volleyball coach. He was most recently the head coach of the women's volleyball team at Notre Dame. McLaughlin was selected to be inducted into AVCA Hall of Fame in 2021.

Teams under McLaughlin's coaching have accomplished two national championships, six Final Four appearances (most recently in 2013), six trips to the Elite Eight, two national players of the year, three Pac-12 (formerly the Pac-10) Conference titles, and 13 players that combined for 28 AVCA All-America awards. McLaughlin was named the 2004 NCAA National Coach of the Year and received the 2002, 2004, 2005, and 2013 Pac-12 Coach of the Year awards.

Before Washington, he spent seven seasons as the men's head coach at USC, where he won the 1990 national championship and finished as runner-up in 1991, followed by a four-year run in the Big 12 Conference leading the women's program at Kansas State.

Through the 2013 season, McLaughlin had a 326-87 (.789) record with the Huskies in 13 seasons.

== Playing career ==
McLaughlin attended Santa Monica Junior College (1980–81), where he played volleyball for two years and transferred to UC Santa Barbara (1982–83). He was the Gauchos' starting setter for two seasons, earning honorable mention All-America honors as a senior.

== Coaching career ==
=== USC ===
McLaughlin was the head coach for the USC Trojans men's volleyball team for seven seasons. In his first year as head coach in 1990, he led the Trojans to the NCAA Men's Volleyball Championship match, defeating Long Beach State, and finished as runner-up the following year. While at USC, McLaughlin's teams were ranked in the top 10 five times, while 15 players earned All-America accolades, led by two-time national player of the year Bryan Ivie.

=== Kansas State ===
McLaughlin spent four seasons building the Kansas State women's program into a national power; he compiled an 82-43 (.656) record and took the Wildcats to four consecutive NCAA tournaments. In his final season, McLaughlin led Kansas State to a 22-9 (.710) record, a program-best No. 16 national ranking, and its first-ever trip to the NCAA Sweet 16, before losing to top-seeded Wisconsin.

During his tenure in Manhattan, two Wildcats earned All-America honors, seven were named to the All-Big 12 first team and 15 garnered first-team academic all-conference accolades. McLaughlin also was honored as the 1999 Big 12 Conference Coach of the Year.

=== Washington ===
When McLaughlin took over the Washington program in 2001, the team was last in the Pac-10 Conference. In his first year at UW, he led the Huskies to an 11-16 record and a 4-14 mark in the Pac-10. The team's 11 wins in 2001 were the most for the program since 1997. One year later, the Huskies went 20-11 and made the NCAA second round. Since 2003, Washington has not won fewer than 23 matches or lost more than nine in any season.

In 2004, the Huskies won their first-ever Pac-10 title, and McLaughlin earned his first AVCA National Coach of the Year honor. In his fifth year at UW in 2005, he led Washington to its first-ever NCAA Women's Volleyball Championship and a 32-1 (.970) record as Washington swept all six of their matches in the tournament, including top-ranked Nebraska in the final at the Alamodome in San Antonio. McLaughlin was named the Pac-10 Coach of the Year, and made history as the first coach in NCAA history to win a national championship in both men and women's volleyball, having led the USC men's team to a national title in 1990.

In 2006, he led UW to its third straight national semifinal, but the Dawgs fell to runner-up Stanford.

The NCAA Championships were hosted in Seattle at KeyArena at Seattle Center in 2013. The Huskies, led by AVCA National Player of the Year and Honda Award Winner Krista Vansant, won the Pac-12 title and reached the Final Four, but fell in straight sets in the semifinals to eventual national champion Penn State.

In his 13 years as head coach, McLaughlin established Washington volleyball as a championship-caliber team. Under his leadership, Washington appeared in the NCAA Tournament every year except in his first year in 2001 and boasts a .789 winning percentage. There have been 51 players that have been honored with All-Conference selections, 50 Academic All-Conference honorees, 31 All-Americans, and 8 Academic All-Americans since McLaughlin’s arrival.

=== Notre Dame ===
McLaughlin was named the women's volleyball head coach at the University of Notre Dame on January 17, 2015. He resigned from his position in June 2018 due to severe back issues.

== Personal ==
Jim is married to the former Margaret Jarc, a four-year soccer monogram winner at the University of Notre Dame. They have three daughters.

== Head coaching record ==
=== Men's college volleyball ===
Record table
Season	Team	Overall	Conference	Standing	Postseason
USC Trojans (WIVA/MPSF) (1990–1996)
1990	USC	26–7	12–4	T-2nd	NCAA Champion
1991	USC	34–2	16–0	1st	NCAA Finals
1992	USC	11–13	9–7	3rd	
1993	USC	18–2	11–8	T-3rd	
1994	USC	18–2	11–8	T-3rd	
1995	USC	23–8	14–5	2nd	
1996	USC	14–16	9–10	5th	
USC:		142-65 (.686)	79–45 (.637)		
Total:		142–65 (.686)			
National champion Postseason invitational champion Conference regular season champion Conference regular season and conference tournament champion Division regular season champion Division regular season and conference tournament champion Conference tournament champion

=== Women's college volleyball ===
Record table
Season	Team	Overall	Conference	Standing	Postseason
Kansas State Wildcats (Big 12 Conference) (1997–2000)
1997	Kansas State	20–13	11–9	6th	NCAA First Round
1998	Kansas State	19–12	12–8	5th	NCAA Second Round
1999	Kansas State	21–9	14–6	4th	NCAA Second Round
2000	Kansas State	22–9	14–6	T-2nd	NCAA Third Round
Kansas State:		82-43 (.656)	51–29 (.638)		
Washington Huskies (Pac-10/12 Conference) (2001–2014)
2001	Washington	11–16	4–14	8th	
2002	Washington	20–11	9–9	T-5th	NCAA Second Round
2003	Washington	23–9	10–8	T-5th	NCAA Quarterfinals
2004	Washington	28–3	16–2	1st	NCAA Semifinals
2005	Washington	32–1	16–1	2nd	NCAA Champion
2006	Washington	29–5	15–3	T-2nd	NCAA Semifinals
2007	Washington	27–4	15–3	2nd	NCAA Second Round
2008	Washington	27–5	15–3	2nd	NCAA Quarterfinals
2009	Washington	24–6	13–5	T-2nd	NCAA Second Round
2010	Washington	24–9	10–8	5th	NCAA Quarterfinals
2011	Washington	24–8	15–7	T-4th	NCAA Second Round
2012	Washington	25–7	14–6	T-4th	NCAA Third Round
2013	Washington	30–3	18–2	1st	NCAA Semifinals
2014	Washington	31–3	18–2	2nd	NCAA Round of 16
Washington:		357-90 (.799)	198–63 (.736)		
Notre Dame Fighting Irish (Atlantic Coast Conference) (2015–present)
2015	Notre Dame	7–25	2–18	15th	
2016	Notre Dame	22–10	13–7	6th	
2017	Notre Dame	22–10	12–8	T–5th	NCAA First Round
Notre Dame:		51-45 (.531)	27–33 (.450)		
Total:		490–178 (.734)			
National champion Postseason invitational champion Conference regular season champion Conference regular season and conference tournament champion Division regular season champion Division regular season and conference tournament champion Conference tournament champion

- Final Pac-10 season was 2010; became Pac-12 in 2011

== Awards and honors ==
- 2021 – AVCA Hall of Fame
- 2013 – Pac-12 Coach of the Year
- 2005 – Pac-10 Coach of the Year
- 2004 – AVCA National Coach of the Year, AVCA Pacific Region Coach of the Year, Pac-10 Coach of the Year
- 2002 – Pac-10 Coach of the Year
- 1999 – Big 12 Coach of the Year
