= 2005 NCAA Division I women's volleyball tournament =

Volleyball competition

2005 NCAA women's Division I volleyball tournament
- 2005 NCAA Final Four logo
- Champions: Washington (1st title)
- Runner-up: Nebraska (5th title match)
- Semifinalists: Tennessee (1st Final Four); Santa Clara (1st Final Four)
- Winning coach: Jim McLaughlin (1st title)
- Most outstanding player: Christal Morrison (Washington)
- Final Four All-Tournament Team: Sanja Tomasevic (Washington); Courtney Thompson (Washington); Christina Houghtelling (Nebraska); Sarah Pavan (Nebraska); Jennifer Saleaumua (Nebraska); Kristen Andre (Tennessee)

The 2005 NCAA Division I women's volleyball tournament began on December 1, 2005, with 64 teams and concluded on December 17, 2005, when Washington defeated Nebraska 3 games to 0 in San Antonio, Texas for the program's first NCAA title.

The 2005 NCAA Final Four, held at the Alamodome, had two participants who were making the school's first-ever Final Four appearance. Fifteenth-seeded Tennessee and unseeded Santa Clara upset their way into the semifinals. In the rally scoring era (since 2001), no unseeded team had ever reached the national semifinals, while Tennessee was the lowest overall seed to reach the Final Four.

The 2005 NCAA Tournament was the 25th anniversary of the NCAA Women's Volleyball Championship.

== Records ==
Omaha Regional
Seed	School	Conference	Berth Type	Record
	Alabama A&M	SWAC	Automatic	15-11
	American	Patriot	Automatic	25-9
	Duke	ACC	At-large	23-7
8	Florida	SEC	Automatic	30-2
	Florida A&M	MEAC	Automatic	22-5
	Florida Atlantic	Atlantic Sun	Automatic	29-2
	Kansas	Big 12	At-large	15-14
	Kansas State	Big 12	At-large	20-10
	Kentucky	SEC	At-large	17-11
	Long Beach State	Big West	Auto (shared)	25-6
9	Louisville	Big East	At-large	29-2
	Maryland	ACC	Auto (shared)	27-4
1	Nebraska	Big 12	Automatic	28-1
	San Diego	West Coast	At-large	22-5
16	UCLA	Pac-10	At-large	18-10
	Western Kentucky	Sun Belt	Automatic	31-2

College Station Regional
Seed	School	Conference	Berth Type	Record
	California	Pac-10	At-large	18-10
	College of Charleston	Southern	Automatic	30-1
	Colorado	Big 12	At-large	15-12
	Colorado State	Mountain West	At-large	20-8
	Dayton	Atlantic 10	Automatic	24-10
	Loyola (IL)	Horizon	Automatic	13-17
	North Carolina	ACC	Auto (shared)	23-9
	Northwestern	Big Ten	At-large	19-11
6	Notre Dame	Big East	Automatic	28-3
14	Purdue	Big Ten	At-large	23-8
	Siena	MAAC	Automatic	20-11
	Texas A&M	Big 12	At-large	16-13
	Valparaiso	Mid-Continent	Automatic	27-7
	VCU	CAA	Automatic	22-11
3	Washington	Pac-10	Automatic	26-1
11	Wisconsin	Big Ten	At-large	23-6

Palo Alto Regional
Seed	School	Conference	Berth Type	Record
	Alabama	SEC	At-large	23-10
4	Arizona	Pac-10	At-large	22-5
	BYU	Mountain West	At-large	25-3
	Loyola Marymount	West Coast	At-large	19-10
	Marshall	Conference USA	Automatic	26-5
	Nevada	WAC	At-large	18-12
	Ohio	MAC	Automatic	31-2
13	Ohio State	Big Ten	At-large	21-8
	Pepperdine	West Coast	At-large	17-11
	Sacramento State	Big Sky	Automatic	26-8
	Santa Clara	West Coast	Automatic	23-4
5	Stanford	Pac-10	At-large	25-5
	UC Santa Barbara	Big West	Auto (shared)	21-8
12	USC	Pac-10	At-large	16-10
	Utah	Mountain West	Automatic	22-8
	Utah State	Mountain West	At-large	21-12

State College Regional
Seed	School	Conference	Berth Type	Record
	Arkansas	SEC	At-large	20-11
	Binghamton	America East	Automatic	20-11
	Cornell	Ivy League	Automatic	19-5
7	Hawaii	WAC	Automatic	25-6
	Jacksonville State	Ohio Valley	Automatic	19-10
	Long Island	Northeast	Automatic	25-13
	LSU	SEC	At-large	21-7
	Minnesota	Big Ten	At-large	24-7
10	Missouri	Big 12	At-large	22-4
	Missouri State	Missouri Valley	Automatic	24-8
2	Penn State	Big Ten	Automatic	29-2
	Saint Mary's	West Coast	At-large	19-9
15	Tennessee	SEC	At-large	21-8
	Texas	Big 12	At-large	23-4
	Texas State	Southland	Automatic	17-14
	Winthrop	Big South	Automatic	28-5

== Omaha Regional ==
First round December 1–3
1	Nebraska	3
Alabama A&M	0
Omaha, NE
American	0
Duke	3
San Diego	3
Long Beach State	1
Los Angeles, CA
Kansas	1
16	UCLA	3
9	Louisville	3
Western Kentucky	1
Louisville, KY
Maryland	3
Kentucky	1
Kansas St.	3
Florida A&M	1
Gainesville, FL
Florida Atlantic	0
8	Florida	3

Second round December 2
1	Nebraska	3
Duke	0
San Diego	0
16	UCLA	3
9	Louisville	3
Maryland	0
Kansas St.	0
8	Florida	3

Regional semifinals December 9
1	Nebraska	3
16	UCLA	0
9	Louisville	0
8	Florida	3

Regional finals December 10
1	Nebraska	3
8	Florida	0

=== Upsets ===
As expected, Nebraska, UCLA, Louisville, and Florida got to the Sweet 16 round. Florida swept past Louisville and top seeded Nebraska swept past UCLA to advance to the regional finals. Nebraska defeated Florida, 30–26, 30–24, 30–16 to advance to the final four.

== Stanford Regional ==
First round December 1–2
5	Stanford	3
Nevada	0
Stanford, CA
Santa Clara	3
Sacramento St.	1
Pepperdine	3
BYU	1
Los Angeles, CA
UCSB	1
12	Southern California	3
13	Ohio St.	3
Marshall	0
Columbus, OH
Ohio	3
Alabama	1
Utah	3
Loyola Marymount	0
Salt Lake City, UT
Utah State	0
4	Arizona	3

Second round December 3
5	Stanford	1
Santa Clara	3
Pepperdine	3
12	Southern California	0
13	Ohio St.	0
Ohio	3
Utah	1
4	Arizona	3

Regional semifinals December 9
Santa Clara	3
Pepperdine	0
Ohio	2
4	Arizona	3

Regional finals December 10
Santa Clara	3
4	Arizona	2

=== Upsets ===
Many upsets were seen in this regional. In the second round, defending national champion and fifth seeded Stanford was stunned by unseeded Santa Clara on their home floor. Then, unseeded Pepperdine defeated twelfth seeded Southern California on Southern California's home court. The upsets continued in the second round, as unseeded Ohio defeated thirteenth seeded Ohio St. on the Buckeye's home floor. The only upset not seen was 4th seeded Arizona defeating Utah, and advanced to the Sweet 16 as the only remaining seeded participant.

Santa Clara defeated Pepperdine, 3–0, to advance to the regional finals. Arizona was nearly the victim of yet another upset, outlasting a 5-game match to Ohio. However, in the next round, Arizona was the victim of an upset, as Santa Clara defeated them, 3–2, to advance to their first final four in school history. Santa Clara won the fifth and deciding game, 17–15.

== College Station Regional ==
First round December 1–2
3	Washington	3
Siena	0
Fort Collins, CO
Colorado St.	3
Colorado	1
North Carolina	1
College of Charleston	3
Chapel Hill, NC
VCU	0
14	Purdue	3
11	Wisconsin	3
Loyola-Chicago	0
Madison, WI
Valparaiso	0
California	3
Northwestern	3
Texas A&M	2
South Bend, IN
Dayton	2
6	Notre Dame	3

Second round December 3
3	Washington	3
Colorado St.	0
College of Charleston	0
14	Purdue	3
11	Wisconsin	3
California	0
Northwestern	0
6	Notre Dame	3

Regional semifinals December 9
3	Washington	3
14	Purdue	0
11	Wisconsin	3
6	Notre Dame	2

Regional finals December 10
3	Washington	3
11	Wisconsin	0

=== Upsets ===
No upsets were seen up until the regional semifinals, when Wisconsin defeated 6th seeded Notre Dame in a 5-game match.

== University Park Regional ==
First round December 1–2
7	Hawai'i	3
Texas St.	0
Austin, TX
Texas	3
LSU	0
Arkansas	3
St. Mary's	0
Columbia, MO
Missouri St.	0
10	Missouri	3
15	Tennessee	3
Jacksonville St.	0
Knoxville, TN
Winthrop	0
Minnesota	3
Cornell	0
Long Island	3
University Park, PA
Binghamton	0
2	Penn St.	3

Second round December 3
7	Hawai'i	3
Texas	1
Arkansas	0
10	Missouri	3
15	Tennessee	3
Minnesota	2
Long Island	0
2	Penn St.	3

Regional semifinals December 9
7	Hawai'i	1
10	Missouri	3
15	Tennessee	3
2	Penn St.	1

Regional finals December 10
10	Missouri	1
15	Tennessee	3

=== Upsets ===
The University Park regional ended up much like the Stanford regional in terms of upsets. In the first regional semifinal, Missouri surprised Hawai'i by defeating them, 3–1. Then, Tennessee stunned second seeded Penn State on Penn State's home floor, 3–1. Missouri and Tennessee battled in University Park, with Tennessee outlasting Missouri in four games, and much like Santa Clara in the Stanford regional who upset high seeds, advanced to their first final four in school history.

== Final Four – Alamodome, San Antonio, Texas ==
National Semifinals; Thursday, December 15
1	Nebraska	3
Santa Clara	0
3	Washington	3
15	Tennessee	0

National Championship; Saturday, December 17
1	Nebraska	0
3	Washington	3

== National Semifinal recap ==
=== Nebraska vs. Santa Clara ===
Santa Clara's dream run came to an end, as top seeded Nebraska overpowered them, 30–24, 30–19, 30–21. Nebraska hit .449% as a team, while Santa Clara hit just .145%. Nebraska advanced to the title match, sweeping through each opponent in the process.

=== Washington vs. Tennessee ===
Oddly similar to the first semifinal, Tennessee's dream run came to end in another sweep with nearly identical scores to the Nebraska/Santa Clara match, by defeating them 30–25, 30–19, 30–21. Much like Nebraska, Washington swept through each opponent to earn a spot in the title match. It is the first national title attempt in school history.

== National Championship recap: Nebraska vs. Washington ==
In front of 9,000 fans in the Alamodome, top ranked and top seeded Nebraska battled second ranked and third seeded Washington for the national title. Nebraska was ranked number one in the coaches poll all season long, and was trying to become the second school in NCAA history to hold the top spot every week in the season, as Southern California did it in 2003. Washington is coached by Jim McLaughlin

Washington jumped out to a quick 2–0 lead in the first game, prompting AVCA National Coach of the Year John Cook to take an early timeout. Washington dominated throughout the match, winning the first two games, 30–26, 30–25. Despite Nebraska taking an early 7–2 lead in the third game, Washington closed the gap and at 18, it was tied up. The teams remained close until the end, when Washington went on a 4-1 scoring run, and off a solo block from MVP Christal Morrison, Washington stunned Nebraska in a sweep, to claim their first ever national championship.

With the sweep, Washington became just the second school in NCAA history to sweep through every opponent en route to winning the NCAA title, joining Texas from 1988. It was the first time since 2002 that Nebraska had been swept.

Washington coach McLaughlin became the first coach in NCAA history to win a national championship in both men and women's volleyball, as he guided Southern California men's team to the 1990 NCAA title. Before McLaughlin took over for the Washington program in 2001, their record was 8–19. Washington finished off the 2005 season 32–1, the only loss coming to UCLA in a five set match. Ironically, that loss was UCLA head coach Andy Banachowski’s 1,000th career win.

== NCAA Tournament records ==
There are two NCAA tournament records that were set in the 2005 tournament that still stand.

- Hitting percentage, match (individual record) - Nicole Fawcett, Penn State University, .889% vs. Long Island (16–0–18)
- Digs, match (individual record) - Taylor Rayfield, University of North Carolina - 53 digs vs. College of Charleston

== See also ==
- NCAA Women's Volleyball Championship
- AVCA
