= 2024 Penn State Nittany Lions women's volleyball team =

American college volleyball season

2024 Penn State Nittany Lions women's volleyball

Big Ten Champions

NCAA tournament, NCAA National Champions
- Conference: Big Ten Conference
- Record: 35–2 (19–1 Big Ten)
- Head coach: Katie Schumacher-Cawley (3rd season)
- Assistant coaches: Brian Toron (3rd season); Megan Hodge Easy (2nd season); Michael Henchy (1st season)
- Captains: Jess Mruzik; Quinn Menger; Anjelina Starck
- Home arena: Rec Hall

The 2024 Penn State Nittany Lions women's volleyball team represented Pennsylvania State University in the 2024 NCAA Division I women's volleyball season. The Penn State Nittany Lions women's volleyball team was led by 3rd-year head coach Katie Schumacher-Cawley. They are members of the Big Ten Conference and play their home games at Rec Hall.

== Season recap ==
In 2024, Schumacher-Cawley led the team to its best season in seven years, going 29–2 in regular season play and won a share of the Big Ten title after defeating Nebraska in its final conference match. It was the program's 18th Big Ten title overall, and first since 2017. She was named Big Ten Coach of the Year for her efforts. She also coached several players who were recognized with conference awards: Izzy Starck (Freshman of the Year, First Team All-Big Ten, All-Freshman Team), Jess Mruzik (Unanimous First Team All-Big Ten), Camryn Hannah (First Team), Taylor Trammel (First Team), Gillian Grimes (Second Team), Caroline Jurevicius (All-Freshman Team), and Ava Falduto (Sportsmanship Award).

Penn State won its 8th NCAA national championship, after defeating Delaware State, North Carolina, Marquette, Creighton, Nebraska, and Louisville. It was the program's 11th championship appearance in program history, and first since their last win in 2014.

== Offseason ==
=== Outgoing departures ===
Name	Number	Pos.	Height	Year	Hometown	Reason for departure
Maddy Bilinovic	2	L	5'7"	Senior	Independence, OH	Graduated
Mac Podraza	5	S	6'2"	Graduate	Sunbury, OH	Graduated
Macy Van Den Elzen	7	MB	6'3"	Senior	Macungie, PA	Graduated
Cassie Kuerschen	12	L/DS	5'9"	Junior	Mansfield, TX	Graduated
Ally Van Eekeren	13	S	6'0"	Graduate	Naperville, IL	Graduated
Lina Perugini	15	DS	5'7"	Graduate	Bethlehem, PA	Graduated
Zoe Weatherington	17	RS	6'2"	Graduate	Charlotte, NC	Graduated
Allie Holland	20	MB	6'3"	Senior	Hilliard, OH	Graduated

=== Outgoing transfers ===
The 2024 team did not have any pure outgoing transfers. Senior middle blocker Allie Holland and senior libero Maddy Bilinovic both graduated from Penn State and opted to play their fifth year of eligibility (granted by the NCAA due to the COVID-19 Pandemic) at College of Charleston and Creighton, respectively.

=== Incoming transfers ===
Name	Pos.	Height	Year	Hometown	Previous Team	Source
Jordan Hopp	MB	6'2”	Graduate	Alliance, NE	Iowa State	
Caroline Jurevicius	OH/RS	6'2”	Redshirt Freshman	Cleveland, OH	Nebraska	
Maggie Mendelson	MB	6'5”	Junior	Ogden, UT	Nebraska	

=== Incoming recruits ===
2024 Penn State Recruits
Name	Pos.	Height	Hometown	High School
Ava Falduto	L/DS	5'7"	Elmhurst, IL	IC Catholic Prep
Izzy Starck	S	6'1"	Viera, FL	Viera High School

== Roster ==
2024 Penn State Nittany Lions Roster
Libero/Defensive Specialists: 2 Ava Falduto – Freshman; 3 Gillian Grimes – Junior; 6 Kate Lally – Sophomore; 11 Jocelyn Nathan – Sophomore; Setters: 21 Izzy Starck - Freshman; 24 Quinn Menger – Senior (also listed as a defensive specialist)	Middle Blockers: 1 Taylor Trammell - Senior; 5 Jordan Hopp – Senior; 23 Catherine Burke – Sophomore; 44 Maggie Mendelson – Junior	Outside Hitters: 4 Karis Willow – Sophomore; 8 Camryn Hannah – Senior; 9 Jess Mruzik – Senior; 10 Anjelina Starck – Senior; Opposite Hitters: 8 Caroline Jurevicius – Redshirt Freshman; 19 Alexa Markley – Junior

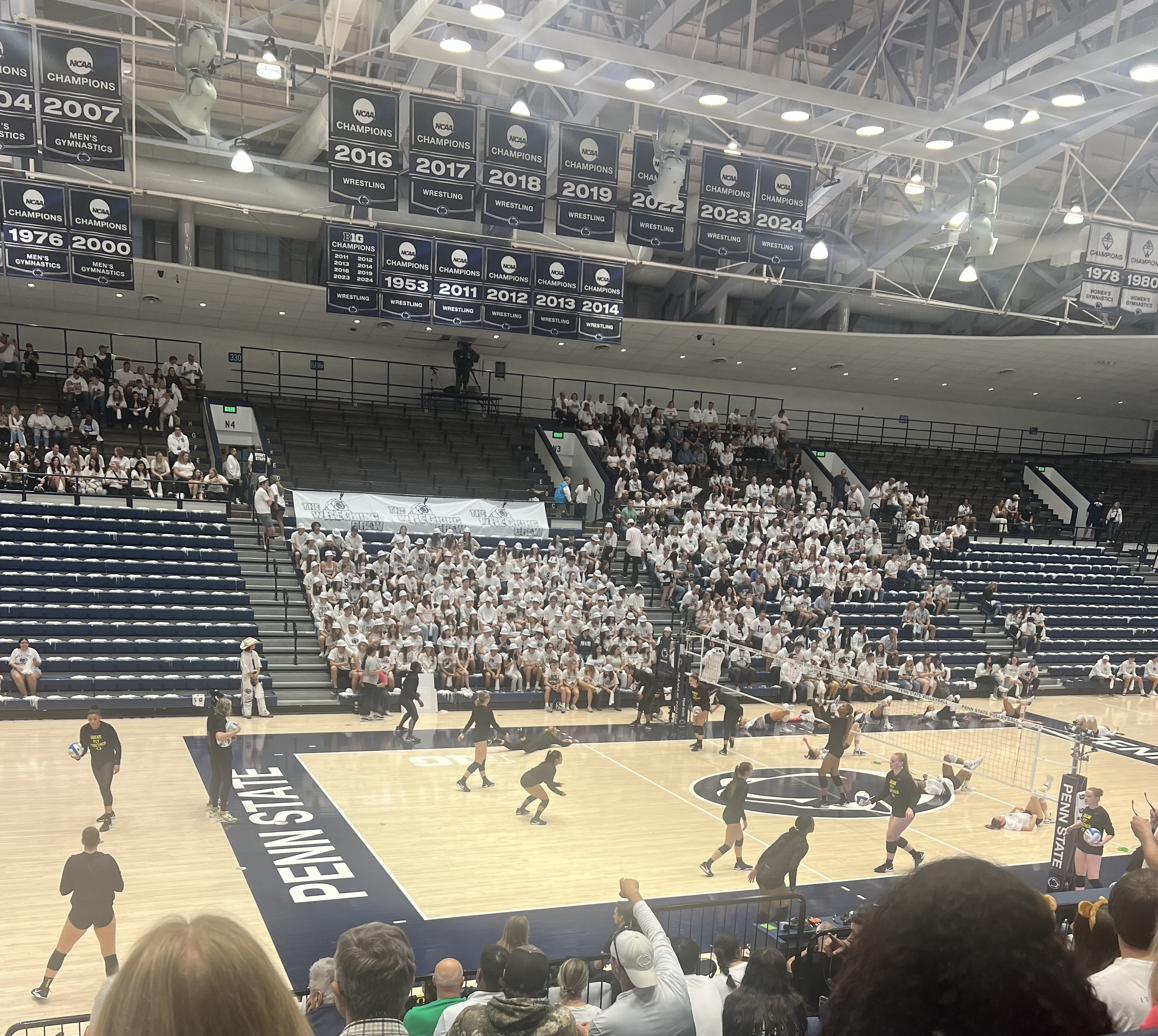
2024 Penn State volleyball team, warming up before a match against Oregon on October 4, 2024 at Rec Hall.

=== Coaches ===
2024 Penn State Nittany Lions Coaching Staff
- Katie Schumacher-Cawley – head coach – 3rd year
- Brian Toron – assistant coach – 3rd year
- Megan Hodge Easy – assistant coach – 2nd year
- Michael Henchy – assistant coach – 1st year
- Tina Readling – director of operations
- Sydnie Mabry – performance analyst

=== Support staff ===
2024 Penn State Nittany Lions Coaching Staff
- Scott Campbell – assistant athletic trainer
- Matt Dorn – assistant director of athletic performance

== Schedule ==
Date Time	Opponent	Rank	Arena City (Tournament)	Television	Score	Attendance	Record (Big Ten Record)
Regular Season
August 30; 6:00 p.m.	at #15 Tennessee	#7	Food City Center; Knoxville, TN	ESPNU	W 3–1 (22–25, 25–16, 25–15, 25–20)	6,193	1–0
September 1; 5:30 p.m.	at Temple	#7	McGonigle Hall; Philadelphia, PA	ESPN+	W 3–0 (25–16, 25–17, 25–15)	583	2–0
September 3; 7:30 p.m.	vs. #4 Louisville	#7	Rec Hall; University Park, PA	BTN	W 3–0 (25–15, 25–19, 25–13)	3,865	3–0
September 6; 7:00 p.m.	at #9 Kentucky	#7	Memorial Coliseum (Kentucky Invitational); Lexington, KY	SECN	W 3–2 (19–25, 23–25, 26–24, 25–22, 15–8)	3,355	4–0
September 7; 5:00 p.m.	vs. Ball State	#7	Memorial Coliseum (Kentucky Invitational); Lexington, KY	Not televised	W 3–0 (25–22, 25–21, 25–21)	145	5–0
September 13; 8:30 p.m.	vs. Duke	#3	Rec Hall (Penn State Invitational); University Park, PA	FS1	W 3–0 (25–9, 25–15, 25–15)	3,152	6–0
September 14; 10:30 a.m.	vs. Princeton	#3	Rec Hall (Penn State Invitational); University Park, PA	BIG+	W 3–0 (25–15, 25–16, 25–21)	2,827	7–0
September 14; 6:30 p.m.	vs. St. John's	#3	Rec Hall (Penn State Invitational); University Park, PA	BIG+	W 3–0 (25–19, 25–22, 25–15)	2,827	8–0
September 18; 7:00 p.m.	at #1 Pittsburgh	#3	Petersen Events Center; Pittsburgh, PA	ACCN	L 0–3 (15–25, 19–25, 18–25)	11,800	8–1
September 20; 6:00 p.m.	vs. James Madison	#3	Rec Hall (Penn State Classic); University Park, PA	BIG+	W 3–0 (25–20, 25–20, 25–19)	2,408	9–1
September 22; 2:00 p.m.	vs. Yale	#3	Rec Hall (Penn State Classic); University Park, PA	BIG+	W 3–1 (25–18, 25–16, 23–25, 25–13)	2,178	10–1
September 25; 7:00 p.m.	at #10 Purdue*	#4	Holloway Gymnasium; West Lafayette, IN	BTN	W 3–0 (25–14, 25–21, 25–20)	2,415	11–1 (1–0)
September 29; 2:00 p.m.	vs. Michigan State*	#4	Rec Hall; University Park, PA	BIG+	W 3–1 (23–25, 25–17, 25–21, 25–23)	2,605	12–1 (2–0)
October 3; 6:00 p.m.	vs. Maryland*	#3	Rec Hall; University Park, PA	BTN	W 3–1 (22–25, 25–20, 25–23, 25–16)	2,209	13–1 (3–0)
October 4; 7:00 p.m.	vs. #11 Oregon*	#3	Rec Hall; University Park, PA	BTN	W 3–0 (25–19, 25–19, 25–17)	4,606	14–1 (4–0)
October 11; 6:00 p.m.	at Michigan State*	#3	Breslin Center; East Lansing, MI	BIG+	W 3–0 (25–16, 25–22, 25–16)	4,170	15–1 (5–0)
October 13; 1:00 p.m.	at Indiana*	#3	Wilkinson Hall; Bloomington, IN	BIG+	W 3–1 (22–25, 25–22, 32–30, 25–22)	1,813	16–1 (6–0)
October 18; 8:00 p.m.	at Ohio State*	#3	Covelli Center; Columbus, OH	BTN	W 3–2 (20–25, 25–23, 25–16, 18–25, 16–14)	3,436	17–1 (7–0)
October 20; 2:00 p.m.	vs. #14 Minnesota*	#3	Rec Hall; University Park, PA	BIG+	W 3–0 (25–16, 25–20, 25–14)	4,316	18–1 (8–0)
October 24; 9:00 p.m.	at UCLA*	#3	Pauley Pavilion; Los Angeles, CA	BTN	W 3–2 (25–21, 19–25, 25–15, 19–25, 15–9)	721	19–1 (9–0)
October 26; 11:00 p.m.	at #16 Southern California*	#3	Galen Center; Los Angeles, CA	BTN	W 3–1 (25–18, 20–25, 25–20, 32–30)	2,256	20–1 (10–0)
October 30; 7:30 p.m.	vs. Michigan*	#3	Rec Hall; University Park, PA	BTN	W 3–0 (25–16, 25–15, 25–17)	2,320	21–1 (11–0)
November 1; 6:30 p.m.	vs. Iowa*	#3	Rec Hall; University Park, PA	BIG+	W 3–1 (25–19, 20–25, 25–17, 25–16)	3,215	22–1 (12–0)
November 8; 7:00 p.m.	at Northwestern*	#3	Welsh-Ryan Arena; Evanston, IL	BIG+	W 3–1 (23–25, 25–18, 29–27, 25–21)	4,908	23–1 (13–0)
November 9; 7:00 p.m.	at #7 Wisconsin*	#3	UW Field House; Madison, WI	NBC	L 0–3 (23–25, 12–25, 13–25)	7,229	23–2 (13–1)
November 15; 7:00 p.m.	vs. Illinois*	#4	Rec Hall; University Park, PA	BIG+	W 3–0 (25–23, 25–18, 25–21)	3,425	24–2 (14–1)
November 17; 2:30 p.m.	at Maryland*	#4	Xfinity Center; College Park, MD	BIG+	W 3–1 (25–13, 22–25, 25–13, 25–15)	1,938	25–2 (15–1)
November 21; 6:00 p.m.	vs. #8 Purdue*	#4	Rec Hall; University Park, PA	BTN	W 3–0 (25–20, 25–23, 25–16)	2,610	26–2 (16–1)
November 24; 2:00 p.m.	vs. Washington*	#4	Rec Hall; University Park, PA	BIG+	W 3–1 (27–29, 25–9, 25–22, 25–19)	3,200	27–2 (17–1)
November 27; 7:00 p.m.	at Rutgers*	#4	Jersey Mike's Arena; Piscataway, NJ	BIG+	W 3–0 (25–12, 25–22, 25–20)	3,128	28–2 (18–1)
November 29; 5:00 p.m.	vs. #2 Nebraska*	#4	Rec Hall; University Park, PA	BTN/FOX	W 3–1 (25–21, 14–25, 25–22, 25–23)	6,597	29–2 (19–1)
2024 NCAA Tournament
December 6; 7:30 p.m.	vs. Delaware State	#2	Rec Hall; University Park, PA (NCAA First Round)	ESPN+	W 3–0 (25–4, 25–20, 25–18)	2,516	30–2
December 7; 6:30 p.m.	vs. #19 North Carolina	#2	Rec Hall; University Park, PA (NCAA Second Round)	ESPN+	W 3–1 (25–21, 25–18, 20–25, 25–15)	2,470	31–2
December 13; 3:00 p.m.	vs. Marquette	#2	Rec Hall; University Park, PA (NCAA Sweet 16)	ESPN2/ESPN+	W 3–1 (25–15, 25–21, 24–26, 25–20)	2,914	32–2
December 15; 8:30 p.m.	vs. #6 Creighton	#2	Rec Hall; University Park, PA (NCAA Elite 8)	ESPN/ESPN+	W 3–2 (25–15, 16–25, 22–25, 25–20, 15–7)	3,558	33–2
December 19; 9:45 p.m.	vs. #3 Nebraska	#2	KFC Yum! Center; Louisville, KY (NCAA Final Four)	ESPN/ESPN+	W 3–2 (23–25, 18–25, 25–23, 28–26, 15–13)	21,726	34–2
December 22; 3:00 p.m.	at #4 Louisville	#2	KFC Yum! Center; Louisville, KY (NCAA National Championship)	ABC/ESPN3/ ESPN+	W 3–1 (25–23, 32–34, 25–20, 25–17)	21,860	35–2
* Indicates Conference Opponent, Times listed are Eastern Time Zone, Source; *Total 2024 Attendance: 161,494

== Awards and honors ==
=== National Honors ===
National Awards & Honors
Player	Position	Class	Award	Ref.
Jess Mruzik	OH	Senior	1st Team All-American	
Izzy Starck	S	Freshman	2nd Team All-American	
Taylor Trammell	MB	Senior	Honorable Mention All-American	
Camryn Hannah	OH	Senior	Honorable Mention All-American	
Izzy Starck	S	Freshman	AVCA National Freshman of the Year; AVCA East Region Freshman of the Year	
Jess Mruzik	OH	Senior	1st Team All-East Region	
Camryn Hannah	OH	Senior	1st Team All-East Region	
Izzy Starck	S	Freshman	1st Team All-East Region	
Taylor Trammell	MB	Senior	1st Team All-East Region	
Alexa Markley	RS	Junior	NCAA Elite 90 Award	

=== Conference honors ===
==== Player awards ====
Conference Awards
Player	Position	Class	Team/Award	Ref.
Izzy Starck	S	Freshman	Freshman of the Year	
Jess Mruzik*	OH	Senior	1st	
Camryn Hannah	OH	Senior	1st	
Izzy Starck	S	Freshman	1st	
Taylor Trammell	MB	Senior	1st	
Gillian Grimes	L	Junior	2nd	
Caroline Jurevicius	RS	Redshirt Freshman	All-Freshman Team	
Izzy Starck*	S	Freshman	All-Freshman Team	
Ava Falduto	L/DS	Freshman	Sportsmanship Honoree	

*Indicates Unanimous Selection

==== Coach awards ====
Conference Awards
Coach	Position	Award	Ref.
Katie Schumacher-Cawley	Head coach	Coach of the Year	
