= 2025 Penn State Nittany Lions women's volleyball team =

American college volleyball season

2025 Penn State Nittany Lions women's volleyball

2025 NCAA tournament, Second Round
- Conference: Big Ten Conference
- Record: 19–13 (12–8 Big Ten)
- Head coach: Katie Schumacher-Cawley (4th season)
- Assistant coaches: Brian Toron (4th season); Megan Hodge Easy (3rd season); Michael Henchy (2nd season)
- Captains: Gillian Grimes; Jordan Hopp; Emmi Sellman
- Home arena: Rec Hall

The 2025 Penn State Nittany Lions women's volleyball team represented Pennsylvania State University in the 2025 NCAA Division I women's volleyball season. The Penn State Nittany Lions women's volleyball team were led by 4th-year head coach Katie Schumacher-Cawley. The 2025 Penn State was the defending NCAA champions, having won the program's 8th national title in 2024.

They are members of the Big Ten Conference and play their home games at Rec Hall.

== Season recap ==
The 2025 Penn State Nittany Lions women's volleyball team entered the season as the defending NCAA Division I champions, following their 2024 title run. Expectations were high as the team was ranked the #2 in the country to start the season. The team encountered challenges throughout the season, including the early season departure of standout setter Izzy Starck, who stepped away from the team and later entered the transfer portal.

Penn State experienced an inconsistent regular season marked by several losses to ranked opponents. They finished the regular season with an 18–12 record and 12–8 Big Ten conference record, finishing sixth in the conference. Their highest ranked win of the season was an upset of then-#7 Wisconsin on October 10, 2025.

The Nittany Lions received an at-large bid to the 2025 NCAA Division I women's volleyball tournament, continuing the program's streak of being the only Division I school to earn an appearance in all 45 NCAA tournaments. They defeated South Florida in the first round, before losing to top seeded Texas in the second round.

== Offseason ==
=== Outgoing departures ===
Name	Number	Pos.	Height	Year	Hometown	Reason for departure
Taylor Trammell	1	MB	6'2"	Graduate	Lexington, KY	Graduated
Camryn Hannah	8	OH	6'2"	Graduate	Lansing, IL	Graduated
Jess Mruzik	9	OH	6'1"	Graduate	Livonia, MI	Graduated
Anjelina Starck	10	OH	6'2"	Senior	Colorado Springs, CO	Graduated
Quinn Menger	24	DS/S	5'9"	Senior	Powhatan, VA	Graduated

=== Outgoing transfers ===
Name	Pos.	Height	Year	Hometown	New Team	Source
Alexa Markley	OPP	6'2”	Junior	Peachtree City, GA	Washington	

=== Incoming transfers ===
Name	Pos.	Height	Year	Hometown	Previous team	Source
Addie Lyon	S	5'9”	RS Senior	O'Fallon, MO	Saint Louis	
Kennedy Martin	OPP	6'6”	Junior	Fort Mill, SC	Florida	
Emmi Sellman	OH	6'4”	Sophomore	Burtonsville, MD	Ohio State	

=== Incoming recruits ===
2025 Penn State Recruits
Name	Pos.	Height	Hometown	High School
Marin Collins	OH	6'3"	Lake View, NY	Frontier Central
Alexis Ewing	OH	6'4"	Bethesda, MD	Bullis School
Lexi Gin	DS	5'6"	Indianapolis, IN	Brebeuf Jesuit Preparatory School
Ava Jurevicius	DS	5'9"	Lincoln, NE	Lincoln Lutheran
Gabrielle Nichols	MB	6'2"	Winston-Salem, NC	Reagan

== Roster ==
2025 Penn State Nittany Lions Roster
Libero/Defensive Specialists: 2 Ava Falduto – Sophomore; 3 Gillian Grimes – Senior; 6 Kate Lally – Junior; 9 Lexi Gin – Freshman; 10 Ava Jurevicius – Freshman; 11 Jocelyn Nathan – Junior; Setters: 7 Addie Lyon – Redshirt Senior; 21 Izzy Starck – Sophomore (Note: Sophomore setter Izzy Starck announced that she was stepping away from volleyball for the 2025 season on September 5, 2025. She was removed from the official 2025 Penn State roster shortly after, and later announced her intent to enter the transfer portal.)	Middle Blockers: 5 Jordan Hopp – Senior; 8 Gabrielle Nichols – Freshman; 23 Catherine Burke – Junior; 44 Maggie Mendelson – Senior	Outside Hitters: 4 Karis Willow – Junior; 13 Emmi Sellman – Sophomore; 15 Marin Collins – Freshman; 27 Alexis Ewing – Freshman; Opposite Hitters: 8 Caroline Jurevicius – Redshirt Sophomore; 18 Kennedy Martin – Junior

=== Coaches ===
2025 Penn State Nittany Lions Coaching Staff
- Katie Schumacher-Cawley – head coach – 4th year
- Brian Toron – assistant coach – 4th year
- Megan Hodge Easy – assistant coach – 3rd year
- Michael Henchy – assistant coach – 2nd year

=== Support staff ===
2025 Penn State Nittany Lions Support Coaching Staff
- Sarah Tischler – director of operations
- Sydnie Mabry – performance analyst
- Scott Campbell – athletic trainer
- Matt Dorn – athletic performance coach

== Schedule ==
Date Time (ET)	Opponent	Rank	Arena City (Tournament)	Television	Score	Attendance	Record (Big Ten Record)
Regular Season
August 23; 2:00 PM	vs. #12 Creighton	#2	Pinnacle Bank Arena (AVCA First Serve); Lincoln, NE	Fox Sports 1	W 3–0 (25–18, 25–22, 26–24)		1–0
August 25; 6:30 PM	vs. #14 Kansas	#2	Sanford Pentagon (AVCA First Serve); Sioux Falls, SD	Big Ten Network	W 3–2 (25–22, 24–26, 16–25, 30–28, 15–12)	3,397	2–0
August 31; 5:00 PM	vs. #13 Arizona State	#2	PPG Paints Arena (State Farm College Volleyball Showcase); Pittsburgh, PA	Fox	L 1–3 (25–21, 23–25, 20–25, 29–31)	7,723	2–1
September 1; 5:00 PM	vs. #24 TCU	#5	PPG Paints Arena (State Farm College Volleyball Showcase); Pittsburgh, PA	Fox	L 2–3 (19–25, 15–25, 25–20, 25–19, 12–15)		2–2
September 5 TBA	vs. #4 Kentucky	#5	Rec Hall (Penn State Invitational); University Park, PA	Fox	L 0–3 (21–25, 16–25, 23–25)	6,031	2–3
September 7 TBA	vs. New Hampshire	#5	Rec Hall (Penn State Invitational); University Park, PA	BIG+	W 3–0 (25–11, 25–15, 25–20)	3,737	3–3
September 9 TBA	vs. Bucknell	#12	Rec Hall; University Park, PA	BIG+	W 3–0 (25–19, 25–10, 25–20)	3,191	4–3
September 17; TBA	vs. #5 Pittsburgh	#13	Rec Hall; University Park, PA	Big Ten Network	L 1–3 (23–25, 17–25, 25–23, 17–25)	5,211	4–4
September 19; TBA	vs. Princeton	#13	Rec Hall (Penn State Classic); University Park, PA	BIG+	W 3–2 (25–15, 20–25, 22–25, 25–16, 15–8)	3,335	5–4
September 21; TBA	vs. Central Michigan	#13	Rec Hall (Penn State Classic); University Park, PA	BIG+	W 3–0 (25–21, 25–20, 25–22)	3,313	6–4
September 26; TBA	vs #17 Southern California*	#15	Rec Hall; University Park, PA	Big Ten Network	W 3–2 (25–13, 25–22, 19–25, 19–25, 15–13)	4,318	7–4 (1–0)
September 28; TBA	vs. UCLA*	#15	Rec Hall; University Park, PA	Big Ten Network	L 1–3 (25–22, 19–25, 23–25, 23–25)	3,964	7–5 (1–1)
October 3 TBA	vs. #1 Nebraska*	#16	Rec Hall; University Park, PA	Fox	L 0–3 (6–25, 15–25, 13–25)	6,257	7–6 (1–2)
October 5 TBA	at Maryland*	#16	Xfinity Center; College Park, MD	Big Ten Network	W 3–2 (25–16, 25–20, 19–25, 23–25, 15–5)	5,093	8–6 (2–2)
October 10; TBA	vs. #7 Wisconsin*	#19	Rec Hall; University Park, PA	Big Ten Network	W 3–0 (25–20, 25–21, 25–16)	5,311	9–6 (3–2)
October 11; TBA	vs. Northwestern*	#19	Rec Hall; University Park, PA	BIG+	W 3–1 (25–18, 25–20, 20–25, 25–16)	3,643	10–6 (4–2)
October 17; 10:00 PM	at Washington*	#17	Alaska Airlines Arena; Seattle, WA	Big Ten Network	L 2–3 (11–25, 17–25, 25–23, 25–20, 13–15)	4,431	10–7 (4–3)
October 18; 10:30 PM	at Oregon*	#17	Matthew Knight Arena; Eugene, OR	Big Ten Network	W 3–1 (25–22, 23–25, 25–23, 27–25)	3,235	11–7 (5–3)
October 24; 7:00 PM	vs. Rutgers*	#18	Rec Hall; University Park, PA	BIG+	W 3–0 (25–23, 25–19, 25–13)	3,647	12–7 (6–3)
October 26; 12:00 PM	at Ohio State*	#18	Covelli Center; Columbus, OH	BIG+	W 3–1 (22–25, 25–23, 25–17, 25–18)	3,476	13–7 (7–3)
October 31; 6:30 PM	at Michigan*	#19	Cliff Keen Arena; Ann Arbor, MI	Big Ten Network	L 2–3 (25–21, 21–25, 28–26, 22–25, 12–15)	1,764	13–8 (7–4)
November 2; 4:00 PM	vs. #24 Indiana*	#19	Rec Hall; University Park, PA	Big Ten Network	L 0–3 (22–25, 15–25, 23–25)	3,651	13–9 (7–5)
November 7; 7:00 PM	at #9 Purdue*	#25	Holloway Gymnasium; West Lafayette, IN		L 0–3 (20–25, 21–25, 22–25)	2,415	13–10 (7–6)
November 9; 4:30 PM	at Illinois*	#25	Huff Hall; Champaign, IL	Big Ten Network	W 3–1 (25–23, 25–27, 25–23, 25–22)	3,753	14–10 (8–6)
November 14; 7:00 PM	at #20 Minnesota*	#24	Maturi Pavilion; Minneapolis, MN	Big Ten Network	L 0–3 (23–25, 23–25, 22–25)	4,486	14–11 (8–7)
November 16; 2:00 PM	vs. Ohio State*	#24	Rec Hall; University Park, PA		W 3–2 (25–22, 15–25, 29–31, 25–14, 15–12)	4,022	15–11 (9–7)
November 21; 7:00 PM	vs. Michigan State*	#24	Rec Hall; University Park, PA		W 3–0 (25–15, 25–19, 25–23)	3,679	16–11 (10–7)
November 23; 2:00 PM	vs. Maryland*	#24	Rec Hall; University Park, PA		W 3–0 (25–19, 25–15, 25–14)	3,237	17–11 (11–7)
November 28; 6:30 PM	at #1 Nebraska*	#25	Bob Devaney Sports Center; Lincoln, NE	Big Ten Network	L 0–3 (14–25, 11–25, 14–25)	8,537	17–12 (11–8)
November 29; 7:00 PM	at Iowa*	#25	Xtream Arena; Coralville, IA	Big Ten Network	W 3–1 (25–22, 25–21, 22–25, 25–20)	723	18–12 (12–8)
2025 NCAA Tournament
December 6; 5:30 p.m.	vs. South Florida	#25	Gregory Gymnasium; Austin, TX (NCAA First Round)	ESPN+	W 3–1 (25–23, 12–25, 25–21, 25–19)	1,200	19–12
December 7; 7:30 p.m.	vs. #3 Texas	#25	Gregory Gymnasium; Austin, TX (NCAA Second Round)	ESPN+	L 0–3 (16–25, 9–25, 19–25)	3,918	19–13
* Indicates Conference Opponent, Times listed are Eastern Time Zone, Source; *Total 2025 Attendance: 120,698

== Awards and honors ==
=== National Honors ===
National Awards & Honors
Player	Position	Class	Award	Ref.
Kennedy Martin	OPP	Junior	1st Team All-American	
Gilliam Grimes	L	Senior	Honorable-Mention All-American	
Kennedy Martin	OPP	Junior	1st Team All-East Region	
Gillian Grimes	L	Senior	1st Team All-East Region	
Maggie Mendelson	MB	Senior	1st Team All-East Region	

=== Conference honors ===
Conference Awards
Player	Position	Class	Team/Award	Ref.
Gillian Grimes	L	Senior	Libero of the Year	
Kennedy Martin*	OPP	Junior	1st	
Gillian Grimes	L	Senior	1st	
Maggie Mendelson	MB	Senior	2nd	
Addie Lyon	S	Senior	Sportsmanship Honoree	

*Indicates Unanimous Selection
