= Katie Schumacher-Cawley =

American volleyball player and coach

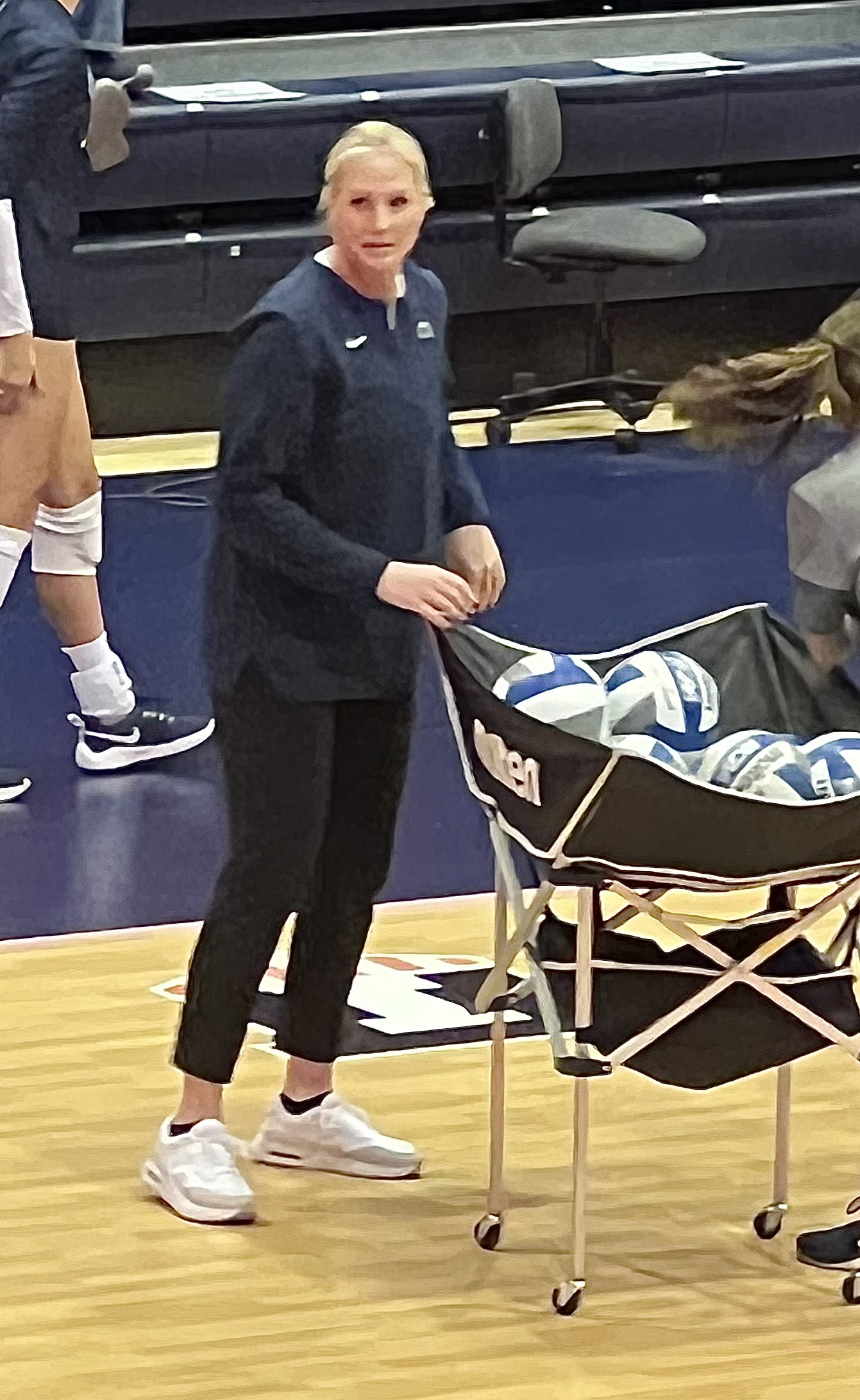
- Schumacher-Cawley in 2022

Current position
- Title: Head coach
- Team: Penn State
- Conference: Big Ten
- Record: 125–37 (.772)

Biographical details
- Born: March 10, 1979 (age 47); Evergreen Park, IL
- Education: Pennsylvania State University

Playing career
- 1998–2001: Penn State (volleyball)
- 2001–2002: Penn State (basketball)

Coaching career (HC unless noted)
- 2002: Illinois (Volunteer Assistant)
- 2003–2009: UIC (Assistant)
- 2009–2016: UIC
- 2017: Penn
- 2018–2021: Penn State (Associate HC)
- 2022–present: Penn State

Head coaching record
- Overall: 250–183 (.577)

Accomplishments and honors

Championships
- NCAA Division I Tournament Champions (2024); Big Ten Champions (2024)

Awards
- AVCA Kathy Deboer Courage Award (2025); Jimmy V Award (2025); Big Ten Coach of the Year (2024); Volleyball Magazine National Coach of the Year (2024); Chicagoland Sports Hall of Fame (2008); Girls Catholic Athletic Conference Hall of Fame (2003)

Katie Anne Schumacher-Cawley (born March 10, 1979) is an American former volleyball and basketball player who is the head coach of the Penn State women's volleyball team. After serving as the associate head coach since 2018, she was named head coach on January 10, 2022, following Russ Rose's retirement from coaching.

In her third season as Penn State's head coach in 2024, Schumacher-Cawley made NCAA history by becoming the first female Division I women's volleyball coach to win an NCAA championship, the program's eighth title overall. The same season, she also led Penn State to the Big Ten Conference title, the program's first since 2017.

== Personal life ==
Schumacher-Cawley is from Chicago, Illinois, growing up in Morgan Park. She attended Mother McAuley High School, graduating in 1997. In her high school career, she played both volleyball and basketball and was arguably the greatest athlete to ever come out of Mother McAuley, leading the volleyball team to two state titles in 1994 and 1995, and a runner-up finish in 1996. In 2014, she was named to McAuley's Hall of Honor. She was inducted into both the Girls Catholic Athletic Conference (GCAC) Hall of Fame and the Catholic League Hall of Fame in 2003 and the Chicagoland Sports Hall of Fame in 2008.

She is married to Mike Cawley, who played football for James Madison University from 1993 to 1995 and was a sixth-round pick by the Indianapolis Colts in the 1996 NFL draft. Together, they have three daughters.

In October 2024, she announced that she was diagnosed with breast cancer. She successfully completed chemotherapy treatment on February 10, 2025. She threw the ceremonial first pitch for her hometown baseball team Chicago White Sox in their June 8, 2025 game against the Kansas City Royals.

On June 30, 2025, she was announced as the 2025 recipient of the Jimmy V Award, and accepted the award at the 2025 ESPY Awards on July 16, 2025.

== Career ==
=== Playing career ===
Schumacher-Cawley played both volleyball and basketball at Penn State, primarily focused on volleyball. With the volleyball team, she was a two time AVCA All-American, and helped lead Penn State to the 1999 national championship and three Big Ten Conference crowns.

=== Coaching career ===
Prior to being named the head coach at Penn State, Schumacher-Cawley was the head coach at UIC and Penn.

A 2002 graduate of Penn State, she was a two-time American Volleyball Coaches Association (AVCA) All-American, three-time All-Big Ten selection, and three-time AVCA All-Region selection volleyball player for the Nittany Lions. She was a member of the 1999 NCAA national championship team and ended her Penn State career with 1,310 kills, 772 digs and 299 blocks. Schumacher-Cawley also played basketball for the Lady Lions basketball team in 2001–2002, and was part of the team's 2002 Sweet Sixteen run.

In her first season as Penn State's head coach in 2022, the team went undefeated in its pre conference season, starting at 11–0, despite having lost 7 starters from the previous season to graduation or transferring. Penn State went 13–7 in conference play, finishing in 5th place. Further, in 2022, she coached several players to conference and national recognition. In the Big Ten, senior outside hitter Kashauna Williams and junior middle blocker Allie Holland were named to first team, while senior setter Seleisa Elisaia were named to the second team. Freshman outside hitter Alexa Markley rounded out conference awards by being named to the All-Freshman team, and graduate student middle blocker Katie Clark earned the sportsmanship honor. In the NCAA postseason, Penn State earned the #4 seed in the Wisconsin regional. She was the only first year head coach in 2022 to lead her team to the Sweet 16 in the NCAA tournament. Moreover, Seleisa Elisaia, Allie Holland, and Kashauna Williams were recognized as AVCA all region first team players.

In the 2024 season, Schumacher-Cawley led the team to its best season in seven years, going 29–2 in regular season play, and won a share of the Big Ten title after defeating Nebraska in its final conference match. It was the program's 18th Big Ten title overall, and first since 2017. She was named Big Ten Coach of the Year for her efforts. She also coached several players who were recognized with conference awards: Izzy Starck (Freshman of the Year, First Team All-Big Ten, All-Freshman Team), Jess Mruzik (Unanimous First Team All-Big Ten), Camryn Hannah (First Team), Taylor Trammel (First Team), Gillian Grimes (Second Team), Caroline Jurevicius (All-Freshman Team), and Ava Falduto (Sportsmanship Award).

Schumacher-Cawley became the first female Division I head coach winner of an NCAA women's volleyball title after leading Penn State to the 2024 national championship.

== Head coaching record ==
Record table
Season	Team	Overall	Conference	Standing	Postseason
UIC Flames (Horizon League) (2009–2016)
2009	UIC	16–18	8–8	5th	
2010	UIC	13–18	7–9	6th	
2011	UIC	14–15	7–9	5th	
2012	UIC	19–13	10–4	2nd	
2013	UIC	9–21	4–10	7th	
2014	UIC	14–17	7–7	6th	
2015	UIC	12–19	5–11	7th	
2016	UIC	16–14	4–12	7th	
UIC:		113–135 (.456)	52–70 (.426)		
Penn Quakers (Ivy League) (2017)
2017	Penn	12–11	7–7	5th	
Penn:		12–11 (.522)	7–7 (.500)		
Penn State Nittany Lions (Big Ten) (2022–present)
2022	Penn State	26–8	13–7	5th	NCAA Regional Semifinal
2023	Penn State	23–9	15–5	T–3rd	NCAA Regional Semifinal
2024	Penn State	35–2	19–1	T–1st	NCAA National Champions
2025	Penn State	19–13	12–8	T–6th	NCAA Second Round
2026	Penn State	22–5	14–3	T–2nd	
Penn State:		125–37 (.772)	73–24 (.753)		
Total:		250–183 (.577)			
National champion Postseason invitational champion Conference regular season champion Conference regular season and conference tournament champion Division regular season champion Division regular season and conference tournament champion Conference tournament champion
