= Bergen Reilly =

American volleyball player (born 2005)

- Reilly with Nebraska in 2026

Personal information
- Born: May 26, 2005 (age 21)
- Hometown: Sioux Falls, South Dakota, U.S.
- Height: 6 ft 1 in (185 cm)
- Education: Nebraska Cornhuskers (2023–present)

Volleyball information
- Position: Setter

National team
2022–	United States
Medal record
Women's volleyball
Representing United States
Girls' Youth Pan-American Volleyball Cup
Gold medal – first place	2022 Tulsa	Team

Bergen Reilly (born May 26, 2005) is an American college volleyball player for the Nebraska Cornhuskers.

== Early life ==
Reilly grew up in Sioux Falls, South Dakota, the daughter of Tiffany and Brendan Reilly. She joined the varsity team at O'Gorman Catholic High School in eighth grade, where she played alongside her older sister, Raegen. Used at both setter and outside hitter, she led O'Gorman to two SDHSAA Class AA state championships in her sophomore and junior years. A three-time South Dakota Gatorade Player of the Year, she committed to play college volleyball for the Nebraska Cornhuskers and was the top-ranked setter and fourth overall recruit in the class of 2023.

== College career ==
Reilly enrolled early at the University of Nebraska in the spring of 2023. She finished her freshman season with 10.51 assists per set (leading all setters in the Big Ten Conference) and 2.64 digs per set, becoming the first freshman to be named Big Ten Setter of the Year and earning first-team All-Big Ten and second-team AVCA All-American honors. Nebraska went 33–2 and reached national championship game, losing to Texas in the final. In her sophomore year in 2024, she averaged a career-high 11.08 assists and 2.85 digs per set and was named Big Ten Setter of the Year and second-team AVCA All-American for the second time. In what was head coach John Cook's last season, she helped the Cornhuskers to a 33–3 record and back to the NCAA Final Four, losing to eventual champions Penn State.

Under new head coach Dani Busboom Kelly, Reilly was voted team captain before her junior year in 2025. She averaged 10.47 assists and 2.70 digs per set as she led the Cornhuskers to a 33–1 record, their only loss coming to eventual champions Texas A&M in the NCAA regional final. She was named Big Ten Setter of the Year for the third time and was further honored as AVCA Setter of the Year, first-team AVCA All-American, and Big Ten Player of the Year.

== International career ==
Reilly was part of the United States under-19 team that won the 2022 Girls' U19 NORCECA Pan American Cup, being named the tournament's MVP. Later that year, she collected silver with the senior national team at the Pan American Cup Final Six tournament, becoming the first high school player to represent the United States in 20 years. She was a key player for the under-21 team that won the 2024 Women's U21 NORCECA Continental Championship.

== Personal life ==
Reilly got engaged to Nebraska Cornhuskers basketball player Cale Jacobsen in May 2026.
