= 2022 Girls' U19 NORCECA Pan American Cup =

Tournament details
- Host country: United States
- Dates: 18–23 July 2022
- Teams: 8
- Venue: (in Tulsa, Oklahoma host cities)

Final positions
- Champions: United States (1st title)
- Runners-up: Brazil
- Third place: Dominican Republic

Tournament awards
- MVP: Bergen Reilly (USA)

The 2022 Girls' U19 NORCECA Pan American Cup was the sixth edition of the bi-annual women's volleyball tournament. Eight teams participated in this edition held in Tulsa, Oklahoma.

The United States won their first title. Bergen Reilly of the United States won the Most Valuable Player award.

== Preliminary round ==
=== Group A ===
Pos	Team	Pld	W	L	Pts	SPW	SPL	SPR	SW	SL	SR	Qualification
1	Brazil	3	3	0	14	244	169	1.444	9	1	9.000	Semifinals
2	Dominican Republic	3	2	1	10	212	161	1.317	6	3	2.000	Quarterfinals
3	Puerto Rico	3	1	2	6	215	197	1.091	4	6	0.667	Quarterfinals
4	Costa Rica	3	0	3	0	81	225	0.360	0	9	0.000	

Date	Time		Score		Set 1	Set 2	Set 3	Set 4	Set 5	Total	Report
18 July	12:00	Dominican Republic	3–0	Costa Rica	25–10	25–6	25–11			75–27	P2 P3
18 July	16:00	Puerto Rico	1–3	Brazil	25–19	18–25	17–25	21–25		81–94	P2 P3
19 July	12:00	Puerto Rico	3–0	Costa Rica	25–9	25–14	25–5			75–28	P2 P3
19 July	16:00	Dominican Republic	0–3	Brazil	22–25	20–25	20–25			62–75	P2 P3
20 July	12:00	Brazil	3–0	Costa Rica	25–6	25–8	25–12			75–26	P2 P3
20 July	16:00	Dominican Republic	3–0	Puerto Rico	25–20	25–17	25–22			75–59	P2 P3

=== Group B ===
Pos	Team	Pld	W	L	Pts	SPW	SPL	SPR	SW	SL	SR	Qualification
1	United States	3	3	0	15	225	101	2.228	9	0	MAX	Semifinals
2	Mexico	3	2	1	9	209	209	1.000	6	4	1.500	Quarterfinals
3	Canada	3	1	2	4	180	232	0.776	3	7	0.429	Quarterfinals
4	Peru	3	0	3	2	192	264	0.727	2	9	0.222	

Date	Time		Score		Set 1	Set 2	Set 3	Set 4	Set 5	Total	Report
18 July	14:00	Peru	1–3	Canada	23–25	13–25	25–18	20–25		81–93	P2 P3
18 July	18:00	United States	3–0	Mexico	25–11	25–14	25–12			75–37	P2 P3
19 July	14:00	Peru	1–3	Mexico	16–25	25–21	17–25	15–25		73–96	P2 P3
19 July	18:00	United States	3–0	Canada	25–6	25–9	25–11			75–26	P2 P3
20 July	14:00	Canada	0–3	Mexico	20–25	17–25	24–26			61–76	P2 P3
20 July	18:00	United States	3–0	Peru	25–12	25–11	25–15			75–38	P2 P3

== Final round ==
=== Championship bracket ===
Quarterfinals
B2	Mexico	1
A3	Puerto Rico	3
A2	Dominican Republic	3
B3	Canada	1

Semifinals
A1	Brazil	3
A3	Puerto Rico	2
A2	Dominican Republic	0
B1	United States	3

Final
A1	Brazil	0
B1	United States	3
Third place
A3	Puerto Rico	1
A2	Dominican Republic	3

=== Quarterfinals ===
Date	Time		Score		Set 1	Set 2	Set 3	Set 4	Set 5	Total	Report
21 July	16:00	Mexico	1–3	Puerto Rico	25–20	25–27	20–25	21–25		91–97	P2 P3
21 July	18:00	Dominican Republic	3–1	Canada	23–25	25–12	25–12	26–24		99–73	P2 P3

=== Classification 5–8 ===
Date	Time		Score		Set 1	Set 2	Set 3	Set 4	Set 5	Total	Report
22 July	12:00	Peru	0–3	Mexico	16–25	18–25	21–25			55–75	P2 P3
22 July	14:00	Costa Rica	0–3	Canada	25–27	23–25	22–25			70–77	P2 P3

=== Semifinals ===
Date	Time		Score		Set 1	Set 2	Set 3	Set 4	Set 5	Total	Report
22 July	18:00	United States	3–0	Dominican Republic	25–13	25–22	25–15			75–50	P2 P3
22 July	16:00	Brazil	3–2	Puerto Rico	19–25	25–21	25–15	18–25	15–8	102–94	P2 P3

=== Seventh place match ===
Date	Time		Score		Set 1	Set 2	Set 3	Set 4	Set 5	Total	Report
23 July	12:00	Peru	3–0	Costa Rica	25–21	25–22	25–18			75–61	P2 P3

=== Fifth place match ===
Date	Time		Score		Set 1	Set 2	Set 3	Set 4	Set 5	Total	Report
23 July	14:00	Mexico	3–0	Canada	25–23	25–17	25–18			75–58	P2 P3

=== Bronze medal match ===
Date	Time		Score		Set 1	Set 2	Set 3	Set 4	Set 5	Total	Report
23 July	16:00	Dominican Republic	3–1	Puerto Rico	28–26	22–25	25–22	32–30		107–103	P2 P3

=== Final ===
Date	Time		Score		Set 1	Set 2	Set 3	Set 4	Set 5	Total	Report
23 July	18:00	United States	3–0	Brazil	25–15	25–14	25–17			75–46	P2 P3

== Final standing ==
Rank	Team
1st place, gold medalist(s)	United States
2nd place, silver medalist(s)	Brazil
3rd place, bronze medalist(s)	Dominican Republic
4	Puerto Rico
5	Mexico
6	Canada
7	Peru
8	Costa Rica

== Individual Awards ==
- Most valuable player
  - Bergen Reilly (USA)
- Best scorer
  - Grace Lopez (PUR)
- Best setter
  - Bergen Reilly (USA)
- Best Opposite
  - Grace Lopez (PUR)
- Best outside hitters
  - Harper Murray (USA)
  - Katielle Vargas (DOM)
- Best middle blockers
  - Juliana Palhano (BRA)
  - Selanny Puente (DOM)
- Best libero
  - Rashany Solano (CRC)
- Best server
  - Ariana Rodríguez (DOM)
- Best receiver
  - Laney Choboy (USA)
- Best digger
  - Alyson Villegas (PER)
