= Harper Murray =

American volleyball player (born 2005)

- Murray with Nebraska in 2026

Personal information
- Born: February 24, 2005 (age 21)
- Hometown: Ann Arbor, Michigan, U.S.
- Height: 6 ft 2 in (188 cm)
- Education: Nebraska Cornhuskers (2023–present)

Volleyball information
- Position: Outside hitter
Medal record
Women's volleyball
Representing United States
Girls' Youth Pan-American Volleyball Cup
Gold medal – first place	2022 Tulsa	Team

Harper Murray (born February 24, 2005) is an American college volleyball player for the Nebraska Cornhuskers.

== Early life ==
Murray grew up in Ann Arbor, Michigan, the daughter of Sarah and Vada Murray. Her father, who played college football for the Michigan Wolverines, died of lung cancer when she was six. Her sister, Kendall, played college volleyball at Michigan. In her senior year at Skyline High School, Murray averaged 6.1 kills per set on a .405 hitting percentage as she helped compile a 38–9 record and reach the MHSAA D1 regional semifinals. She was named the Gatorade National Player of the Year and ranked as the number-one recruit in the class of 2023.

== College career ==
Murray enrolled early at the University of Nebraska in the spring of 2023. Immediately an impact player, she finished her freshman season with 3.23 kills per set (second on the team) on .237 hitting and 2.07 digs per set as the Cornhuskers compiled a 33–2 record. Nebraska reached the national championship game but she struggled in their loss to Texas. She was named the Big Ten Freshman of the Year, first-team All-Big Ten, and third-team AVCA All-American. Over the next months, she spiraled into depression following the loss and negative reactions on social media. Her family worried what she might do to herself and she was arrested for driving under the influence (DUI). When the news broke that had shoplifted US$65 of jewelry, she began a new outpatient therapy program and pretrial diversion program and reached a plea deal for the DUI charge. She publicly apologized for her actions and was not suspended by Nebraska.

Murray led the Cornhuskers with 3.40 kills per set on .257 hitting and had 2.43 digs per set as a sophomore in 2024. Leading the team to a 33–3 record and back to the NCAA Final Four, losing to eventual champions Penn State, she was named first-team All-Big Ten, second-team AVCA All-American, and the NCAA Regional Most Outstanding Player. In her junior year in 2025, she produced a career-high 4.21 kills per set on .295 hitting and 2.16 digs per set. She was named first-team All-Big Ten and first-team AVCA All-American after leading Nebraska to a 33–1 record, their only loss coming to eventual champions Texas A&M in the NCAA regional final. She entered her senior year as the highest-profile student-athlete at Nebraska and the "face of college volleyball", boasting 395,000 followers on Instagram and 900,000 on TikTok.

== International career ==
Murray was part of the United States under-19 team that won the 2022 Girls' U19 NORCECA Pan American Cup, being named the tournament's best spiker.
