= Mark Rosen =

American volleyball coach

Current position
- Title: Head coach

Biographical details
- Born: Anchorage, Alaska
- Education: CSU Northridge

Playing career
- 1981-1985: Cal State Northridge

Coaching career (HC unless noted)
- 1992-1993: Cal State-Bakersfield
- 1994-1997: Northern Michigan
- 1998: Boise State
- 1999–2022: Michigan

Head coaching record
- Overall: 677–336 (.668)

Accomplishments and honors

Championships
- NCAA Division II National Championship (1994); 4× GLIAC Conference Champions (1994–1997); 2× CCAC Conference Champions (1992–1993)

Records
- Winningest coach in Michigan volleyball history (468)

Mark Rosen is a former American volleyball head coach. He was most recently the head coach at the University of Michigan for 24 seasons from 1999 through 2022.

== Early life and education ==
Rosen is a Native of Anchorage, AK. He went to college at California State University, Northridge, where he earned a bachelor's degree in Physical Education and a minor in Biology. He played volleyball at Cal State Northridge, he was a three-time varsity volleyball letterwinner.

== Coaching career ==
=== Michigan ===
Mark Rosen began his career at Michigan in 1999, where he debuted with 16–15 record and NCAA Tournament appearance.

In 2008, Rosen broke Sandy Vong's team record for career wins at Michigan. The 2008 team compiled a 26-9 record, marking the first time the team had reached 20 wins in three consecutive seasons.

In 2009, Rosen's team compiled a 27–10 record, defeated No. 4-ranked Stanford in the second round of the NCAA Tournament, and ultimately advanced to the Elite Eight round of the NCAA Tournament.

In 2011, Michigan again defeated Stanford in the NCAA Tournament, reaching the Round of 16. In 2012, the team compiled a 27–12 record and advanced to the National Semifinal round of the NCAA Tournament for the first time in program history.

After the 2022 season, Michigan athletic director Warde Manuel announced that Rosen would not return for the 2023 season, after 24 seasons as the head coach.

== Head coaching record ==
=== College ===
Record table
Season	Team	Overall	Conference	Standing	Postseason
Cal State Bakersfield Roadrunners (California Collegiate Athletic Association) (1992–1993)
1992	Cal State Bakersfield	25–9	11–1	1st	NCAA Division II regional final
1993	Cal State Bakersfield	32–3	10–0	1st	NCAA Division II runner-up
Cal State Bakersfield:		57–12 (.826)	21–1 (.955)		
Northern Michigan Wildcats (Great Lakes Intercollegiate Athletic Conference) (1994–1997)
1994	Northern Michigan	32–4	16–2	1st	NCAA Division II national champion
1995	Northern Michigan	34–3	18–0	1st	NCAA Division II runner-up
1996	Northern Michigan	33–5	17–1	1st	Division II semifinalist
1997	Northern Michigan	35–4	18–0	1st	Division II semifinalist
Northern Michigan:		134–16 (.893)	69–3 (.958)		
Boise State Broncos (Big West Conference) (1998–1998)
1998	Boise State	18–9	11–5	2nd	
Boise State:		18–9 (.667)	11–5 (.688)		
Michigan Wolverines (Big Ten Conference) (1999–2022)
1999	Michigan	16–15	7–13	T-8th	NCAA second round
2000	Michigan	19–14	8–12	7th	NCAA second round
2001	Michigan	13–14	9–11	7th	
2002	Michigan	16–15	10–10	T-6th	NCAA first round
2003	Michigan	21–12	12–8	5th	NCAA second round
2004	Michigan	20–13	9–11	T-6th	NCAA second round
2005	Michigan	13–16	7–13	T-7th	
2006	Michigan	21–13	8–12	T-7th	NCAA first round
2007	Michigan	24–11	10–10	T-5th	NCAA regional semifinal
2008	Michigan	26–9	12–8	5th	NCAA regional semifinal
2009	Michigan	27–10	12–8	T-4th	NCAA regional final
2010	Michigan	23–10	12–8	T-4th	NCAA first round
2011	Michigan	22–13	8–12	T-8th	NCAA regional semifinal
2012	Michigan	27–12	11–9	T-6th	NCAA national semifinal
2013	Michigan	18–14	8–12	T-8th	NCAA first round
2014	Michigan	13–17	8–12	9th	
2015	Michigan	20–13	9–11	9th	NCAA second round
2016	Michigan	24–11	11–9	6th	NCAA regional semifinal
2017	Michigan	21–12	11–9	T-7th	NCAA first round
2018	Michigan	24–10	11–9	6th	NCAA regional semifinal
2019	Michigan	21–11	13–7	6th	NCAA second round
2020	Michigan	4–9	4–9	8th	
2021	Michigan	18–12	11–9	8th	NCAA first round
2022	Michigan	17–13	8–12	9th	
Michigan:		468–299 (.610)	229–244 (.484)		
Total:		677–336 (.668)			
National champion Postseason invitational champion Conference regular season champion Conference regular season and conference tournament champion Division regular season champion Division regular season and conference tournament champion Conference tournament champion

== Personal life ==
Rosen's wife is Leisa (née Wissler) Rosen, Michigan Volleyball associate head coach. They have two sons, Brady and Cameron.
