= Charleston Cougars women's volleyball =

American college volleyball team

- Founded: 1974; 52 years ago
- University: College of Charleston
- Head coach: Jason Kepner (18th season)
- Conference: CAA
- Location: Charleston, South Carolina
- Home arena: TD Arena (capacity: 5,100)
- Nickname: Cougars
- Colors: Maroon and white

AIAW/NCAA tournament appearance
- 2002, 2004, 2005, 2006, 2007, 2009, 2012, 2013, 2017, 2024

Conference tournament champion
- 2002, 2004, 2005, 2006, 2007, 2009, 2012, 2013, 2024

Conference regular season champion
- 1992, 2001, 2002, 2003, 2004, 2005, 2006, 2007, 2008, 2010, 2011, 2014, 2017, 2024

The Charleston Cougars women's volleyball team represents the College of Charleston in the sport of women's volleyball. The Cougars compete in the Coastal Athletic Association of NCAA Division I. The team plays their home games at TD Arena on the College's campus in Charleston, South Carolina. They are coached by Jason Kepner who was hired after the 2006 season. The Cougars have reached ten NCAA women's volleyball tournaments, advancing to the second round in 2005 and 2012.

== History ==
The College of Charleston's women's volleyball team was founded in 1974 and joined Division I in 1991. They have played in the CAA since the 2013 season.

The Cougars first coach, Nancy Wilson, also served as the head coach of the women's basketball team at the College from 1976 to 1984, and later from 2003 to 2011. She led the volleyball team to 286 wins, the second most in program history, and the women's basketball team to 311 victories, the most in program history. After Wilson's first departure in 1984, Amelia Dawley, who had previously played for the Cougars under Wilson, became head coach. She led the program to three consecutive NAIA National Tournaments from 1984 to 1986.

The Cougars made the transition to Division I under coach Laura Lageman in 1991, playing in the TAAC before switching to the Southern Conference under head coach Jewel Geisy McRoberts in 1998. The Cougars won their first SoCon Tournament and made their first NCAA Tournament appearance in 2002, after coach McRoberts had been named SoCon Coach of the Year in 2001.

Sherry Dunbar came in to lead the program from 2003–06, coaching the team to a 67-3 (.957) SoCon record over her four seasons. Under Dunbar's tutelage the Cougars won four consecutive regular season championships, three tournament championships, and made three NCAA Tournament appearances (2004, 2005, 2006), earning their first Tournament win over North Carolina in 2005. The 2005 Cougars set the school record of 32 wins during one season while going undefeated in conference play for the only time in program history. Dunbar was named SoCon Coach of the Year in 2003 and 2005 before leaving to coach the Indiana Hoosiers after the 2006 season.

Jason Kepner, a 1994 National Champion, has been the Cougar's head coach since the 2007 season. In his 18 seasons the program has amassed seven regular season championships, five conference tournament championships, six NCAA Tournament appearances, and one National Invitational appearance. Kepner's Cougars earned the program's second NCAA Tournament victory in 2012, received their first at-large bid to the Tournament in 2017, and made it to the semifinals of the NIVC in 2018. With a record of 344-182 (.654) through the 2023 season, he is the winningest coach in Charleston history.

== Season-by-season results ==
Year	Conference	Games played	Record	Win percentage	Conference record	Head coach	Postseason
1974–83	AIAW (Division II)	406	286–120	.704	N/A	Nancy Wilson	
1984–88	Independent (NCAA Division II)	243	171–72	.704	N/A	Amelia Dawley	NAIA (1984, 1985, 1986)
1989	Independent (NCAA Division II)	33	22–11	.667	N/A	Laura Lageman	
1990	Independent (NCAA Division II)	45	31–14	.689	N/A	Laura Lageman	
1991	Trans-America Athletic Conference (NCAA Division I)	41	29–12	.569	N/A	Laura Lageman	
1992	Trans-America Athletic Conference (NCAA Division I)	39	28–11	.718	N/A	Laura Lageman	
1993	Trans-America Athletic Conference (NCAA Division I)	38	29–9	.763	6–2	Laura Lageman	
1994	Trans-America Athletic Conference (NCAA Division I)	35	27–8	.771	8–2	Laura Lageman	
1995	Trans-America Athletic Conference (NCAA Division I)	39	22–17	.564	4–2	Laura Lageman	
1996	Trans-America Athletic Conference (NCAA Division I)	34	17–17	.500	3–3	Jewel Geisy McRoberts	
1997	Trans-America Athletic Conference (NCAA Division I)	35	16–16	.500	2–4	Jewel Geisy McRoberts	
1998	Southern Conference	33	9–24	.273	5–13	Jewel Geisy McRoberts	
1999	Southern Conference	32	19–13	.594	11–9	Jewel Geisy McRoberts	
2000	Southern Conference	32	15–17	.469	8–12	Jewel Geisy McRoberts	
2001	Southern Conference	33	30–3	.909	19–1	Jewel Geisy McRoberts	
2002	Southern Conference	35	29–6	.829	**18–2**	Jewel Geisy McRoberts	NCAA (first round)
2003	Southern Conference	34	28–6	.824	17–1	Sherry Dubar	
2004	Southern Conference	32	26–6	.813	**15–1**	Sherry Dubar	NCAA (first round)
2005	Southern Conference	34	32–2	.941	**18–0**	Sherry Dubar	NCAA (second round)
2006	Southern Conference	35	27–8	.771	**17–1**	Sherry Dubar	NCAA (first round)
2007	Southern Conference	34	26–8	.765	**16–2**	Jason Kepner	NCAA (first round)
2008	Southern Conference	34	27–7	.794	17–1	Jason Kepner	
2009	Southern Conference	31	18–13	.581	**12–4**	Jason Kepner	NCAA (first round)
2010	Southern Conference	35	29–6	.829	15–1	Jason Kepner	
2011	Southern Conference	35	25–10	.714	14–2	Jason Kepner	
2012	Southern Conference	35	27–8	.771	**14–2**	Jason Kepner	NCAA (second round)
2013	Colonial/Coastal Athletic Association	31	25–6	.806	**13–1**	Jason Kepner	NCAA (first round)
2014	Colonial/Coastal Athletic Association	33	23–10	.697	14–2	Jason Kepner	
2015	Colonial/Coastal Athletic Association	33	20–13	.606	10–6	Jason Kepner	
2016	Colonial/Coastal Athletic Association	29	17–12	.586	10–6	Jason Kepner	
2017	Colonial/Coastal Athletic Association	33	27–6	.818	15–1	Jason Kepner	NCAA (first round)
2018	Colonial/Coastal Athletic Association	35	24–11	.686	11–5	Jason Kepner	NIVC (semifinals)
2019	Colonial/Coastal Athletic Association	28	7–21	.250	4–12	Jason Kepner	
2020	Colonial/Coastal Athletic Association	11	5–6	.455	4–4	Jason Kepner	
2021	Colonial/Coastal Athletic Association	28	16–12	.571	9–7	Jason Kepner	
2022	Colonial/Coastal Athletic Association	30	14–16	.467	9–7	Jason Kepner	
2023	Colonial/Coastal Athletic Association	30	14–16	.467	11–7	Jason Kepner	
2024	Colonial/Coastal Athletic Association	34	25–9	.735	**15–3**	Jason Kepner	NCAA (first round)
Total		1855	1262–593	.680	364–126		11 Appearances
Bold indicates tournament won Italics indicate Conference Championship

== Postseason ==
=== NCAA tournament results ===
The Cougars have appeared in the NCAA tournament ten times. Their combined record is 2–9.

Year	Seed	Round	Opponent	Result
2002		First round	#16 Notre Dame	L 1–3
2004		First round	#8 Southern California	L 0–3
2005		First round Second round	North Carolina #14 Purdue	W 3–1; L 0–3
2006		First round	Arizona State	L 0–3
2007		First round	#13 Florida	L 0–3
2009		First round	#16 Florida	L 0–3
2012		First round Second round	Miami #14 Florida	W 3–2; L 0–3
2013		First round	#16 Duke	L 1–3
2017		First round	Miami	L 1–3
2024		First round	#4 Utah	L 0–3

=== NIVC results ===
The Cougars have appeared in the National Invitational Volleyball Championship (NIVC) one time. Their record is 3–1.

Year	Round	Opponent	Result
2018	First round Second round Third round Semifinals	St. John's; Georgia Tech; Clemson; Tulane	W 3–1; W 3–1; W 3–0; L 1–3

== Medi ==
Under the current Coastal Athletic Association TV deal, all home and in-conference away volleyball games are shown on FloSports.

== See also ==
- Charleston Cougars
