= Erin Virtue =

American volleyball coach (born 1983)

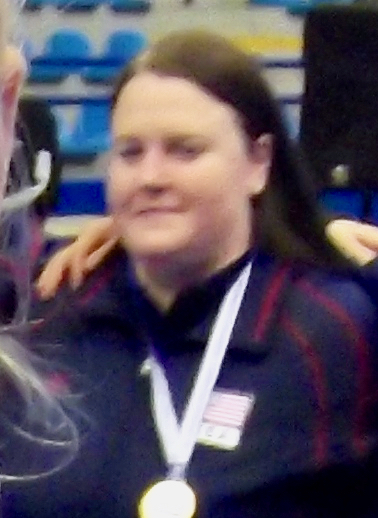
- Virtue in 2014

Current position
- Title: Head coach
- Team: Michigan
- Conference: Big Ten
- Record: 64–58 (.525)

Biographical details
- Born: April 13, 1983 (age 43); St. Charles, Illinois
- Education: University of Illinois

Playing career
- 2001–2004: Illinois

Coaching career (HC unless noted)
- 2006: Loyola (asst.)
- 2007–2010: Cincinnati (asst.)
- 2011–2015: Michigan (asst.)
- 2016–2018: Northwestern (assoc.)
- 2017–2024: U.S. women's (asst.)
- 2023–present: Michigan

Erin Elizabeth Virtue (born April 13, 1983) is an American volleyball head coach at Michigan and former assistant coach for the United States women's national volleyball team.

== Early life ==
Virtue attended St. Francis High School where she helped lead the team to back-to-back Suburban Catholic Conference Championships. She was named to the 2000 all-state team by the Chicago Tribune and all-area teams by the Chicago Sun-Times, the Daily Herald and the Naperville Sun.

== College career ==
Virtue played college volleyball at Illinois. As a true freshman in 2001, she played in 14 matches on the season, as both a setter and as a defensive specialist, and recorded 88 assists. As a sophomore in 2002, she played in 26 matches and recorded 81 assists on the season. She recorded a then career-high 34 assists in her first career start at setter in a game against Penn State.

During her junior year in 2003 she transitioned to a full-time setter. She ranked second in the Big Ten in assists per game (13.56), while ranking seventh in the league in service aces (0.34). During the season she recorded 1,627 assists, the fifth most in a single season in Illinois program history. Following the season she was named to the first-team All-Big Ten and named AVCA Honorable Mention All-American. During her senior year she suffered a torn anterior cruciate ligament (ACL) in her right knee in a game against Ball State on September 17, 2004, and missed the remainder of the season. She was not granted a fifth year of eligibility.

== Coaching career ==
Virtue began her coaching career at Loyola in 2006, where she worked with the setters and handled recruiting. On August 7, 2007, she was named an assistant coach for Cincinnati. During four seasons with the Bearcats she helped lead the team to a 101–36 record.

On April 17, 2011, she was named an assistant coach for Michigan. She served as Michigan's recruiting and offensive coordinator. During her five seasons at Michigan the team advanced to four NCAA Tournament, including two Sweet 16s and their first ever Final Four appearance in 2012. The 2012 Wolverines recorded seven victories over top-25 opponents en route to a modern-day school-record 27 wins.

In 2016, she was named associate head coach for Northwestern. On January 17, 2023, she was named the head coach for Michigan.

=== U.S. National Team ===
She served as head coach of the U.S. Girls' Youth National Team that won silver at the 2016 NORCECA Women's U18 Continental Championship and the coach at the 2017 FIVB Women's U18 World Championship. She has also served as a coach at the Select (U16), Youth (U18) and Junior (U20) age groups.

On March 3, 2017, Virtue was named an assistant coach for the United States women's national volleyball team. In 2019 she was named director of the USA National Team Development Program, where she oversees all U15-U23 development programs for both boys and girls.

She served as an assistant coach for Team USA at the 2020 Summer Olympics, helping lead the team to their first Olympic gold medal.

== Personal life ==
Virtue was born to Patrick and Carol Virtue. She has two brothers and two sisters. Her older sister, Katie, played college volleyball at Ohio State and was named the Big Ten Conference Freshman of the Year in 1999.

== Head coaching record ==
Record table
Season	Team	Overall	Conference	Standing	Postseason
Michigan Wolverines (Big Ten Conference) (2023–present)
2023	Michigan	7–22	5–15	12th	
2024	Michigan	18–13	8–12	T–8th	
2025	Michigan	22–11	11–9	9th	NCAA second round
2026	Michigan	17–12	7–10	12th	
Michigan:		64–58 (.525)	31–46 (.403)		
Total:		64–58 (.525)			
