= 2024 NCAA Division I women's volleyball tournament =

Volleyball competition

2024 NCAA women's Division I volleyball tournament
- 2024 NCAA Division I Championship
- Finals site: KFC Yum! Center; Louisville, Kentucky
- Champions: Penn State (8th title)
- Runner-up: Louisville (2nd title match)
- Semifinalists: Pittsburgh (4th Final Four); Nebraska (18th Final Four)
- Winning coach: Katie Schumacher-Cawley (1st title)
- Most outstanding player: Jess Mruzik (Penn State)
- Final Four All-Tournament Team: Camryn Hannah (Penn State); Gillian Grimes (Penn State); Charitie Luper (Louisville); Sofia Maldonado Diaz (Louisville); Harper Murray (Nebraska); Olivia Babcock (Pittsburgh)

The 2024 NCAA Division I women's volleyball tournament was a single-elimination tournament of 64 teams that determined the National Collegiate Athletic Association (NCAA) Division I women's volleyball national champion for the 2024 season. It was the 44th edition of the tournament. It began on December 5, 2024, in various college campuses across the country, location determinations were chosen based on participating teams seedings. The tournament concluded with the championship game at KFC Yum! Center in Louisville, Kentucky on December 22, 2024.

Pittsburgh earned the #1 overall seed, while Nebraska, Penn State, and Louisville rounded out the top-4 overall seeds. All four teams successfully defeated their first & second round opponents, allowing them to host the regional rounds. Penn State remains the only NCAA Division I women's volleyball program to earn a bid to all 44 NCAA Tournaments since its inception in 1981.

For the first time since the 2008 NCAA tournament, all top-4 overall seeds made it to the final four. The wins guaranteed an ACC vs. Big Ten final, as the semifinal matchups were between conference foes Pittsburgh/Louisville and Nebraska/Penn State. With Louisville and Penn State advancing to the national championship, a female head coach would be guaranteed to win the NCAA Division I championship for the first time in NCAA Division I women's volleyball history.

Penn State won the program's 8th national championship by defeating Louisville 3–1 in the final. Louisville was making its second championship match appearance in 3 years. Penn State was led by Jess Mruzik who had 29 kills. Mruzik would go on to win the NCAA Tournament MVP. Katie Schumacher-Cawley made history by being the first female Division I head volleyball coach to win the title.

== Tournament schedule and venues ==
2024 NCAA First and Second Round venues

First and Second Rounds (Subregionals)
Hosted by the top 16 overall tournament seeds

- December 4 – December 7
  - Petersen Events Center, Pittsburgh, Pennsylvania (Host: University of Pittsburgh)
  - Bob Devaney Sports Center, Lincoln, Nebraska (Host: University of Nebraska–Lincoln)
  - Rec Hall, University Park, PA (Host: Penn State University)
  - KFC Yum! Center, Louisville, Kentucky (Host: University of Louisville)
  - Maples Pavilion, Palo Alto, California (Host: Stanford University)
  - Sokol Arena, Omaha, Nebraska (Host: Creighton University)
  - UW Field House, Madison, Wisconsin (Host: University of Wisconsin)
  - Moody Coliseum, Dallas, TX (Host: Southern Methodist University)
  - Memorial Coliseum, Lexington, Kentucky (Host: University of Kentucky)
  - Desert Financial Arena, Tempe, Arizona (Host: Arizona State University)
  - Gregory Gymnasium, Austin, Texas (Host: University of Texas)
  - Horejsi Family Volleyball Arena, Lawrence, Kansas (Host: University of Kansas)
  - Holloway Gymnasium, West Lafayette, Indiana (Host: Purdue University)
  - Jon M. Huntsman Center, Salt Lake City, UT (Host: University of Utah)
  - Ferrell Center, Waco, TX (Host: Baylor University)
  - Matthew Knight Arena, Eugene, Oregon (Host: University of Oregon)
2024 NCAA Regionals and Final Four

Regional semifinals and finals

- December 12 – December 15
  - Pittsburgh Regional, Petersen Events Center, Pittsburgh, Pennsylvania (Host: University of Pittsburgh)
  - Lincoln Regional, Bob Devaney Sports Center, Lincoln, Nebraska (Host: University of Nebraska–Lincoln)
  - University Park Regional, Rec Hall, University Park, PA (Host: Penn State University)
  - Louisville Regional, Freedom Hall, Louisville, Kentucky (Host: University of Louisville)

National semifinals and championship

- December 19 & 22
  - KFC Yum! Center, Louisville, Kentucky (Host: University of Louisville)

== Qualifying teams ==
=== Automatic qualifiers ===
Teams who won their conference championships automatically qualify.

Automatic qualifiers in the 2024 NCAA Division I women's volleyball tournament
Conference	Team
America East	New Hampshire
American	Wichita State
ACC	Pittsburgh
ASUN	Florida Gulf Coast
Atlantic 10	Loyola Chicago
Big East	Creighton
Big Sky	Sacramento State
Big South	High Point
Big Ten	Penn State
Big 12	Arizona State
Big West	Hawai'i
CAA	Charleston
CUSA	Western Kentucky
Horizon	Cleveland State
Ivy League	Yale
MAAC	Fairfield
MAC	Western Michigan
MEAC	Delaware State
Missouri Valley	Northern Iowa
Mountain West	Colorado State
NEC	Chicago State
Ohio Valley	Morehead State
Patriot	Colgate
SEC	Kentucky
Southern	Wofford
Southland	Texas A&M–Corpus Christi
SWAC	Florida A&M
Summit	South Dakota
Sun Belt	Texas State
WAC	UT Arlington
WCC	Loyola Marymount

=== Tournament seeds ===
Pittsburgh Regional
Seed	RPI	School	Conference	Berth type	Record
1	2	Pittsburgh	ACC	Automatic	29–1
2	8	SMU	ACC	At–Large	24–7
3	10	Kentucky	SEC	Automatic	20–7
4	17	Oregon	Big Ten	At–Large	22–7
5	15	TCU	Big 12	At–Large	21–7
6	28	Minnesota	Big Ten	At–Large	20–10
7	23	Missouri	SEC	Automatic	20–8
8	34	Oklahoma	SEC	At–Large	14–10
	38	UTEP	CUSA	At–Large	27–5
	54	Texas State	Sun Belt	Automatic	22–8
	42	Western Kentucky	CUSA	Automatic	28–6
	40	Hawaii	Big West	Automatic	21–9
	60	High Point	Big South	Automatic	23–6
	108	Cleveland State	Horizon	Automatic	23–9
	65	Wichita State	American	Automatic	18–13
	180	Morehead State	Ohio Valley	Automatic	18–14

Louisville Regional
Seed	RPI	School	Conference	Berth type	Record
1	3	Louisville	ACC	At–Large	25–5
2	5	Stanford	ACC	At–Large	25–4
3	11	Kansas	Big 12	At–Large	24–4
4	15	Purdue	Big Ten	At–Large	25–6
5	24	BYU	Big 12	At–Large	19–9
6	18	Florida	SEC	Automatic	21–7
7	30	Loyola Marymount	WCC	Automatic	24–5
8	35	Northern Iowa	Missouri Valley	Automatic	25–7
	32	Illinois	Big Ten	At–Large	18–12
	36	Washington	Big Ten	At–Large	19–11
	48	NC State	ACC	At–Large	16–12
	57	Loyola Chicago	Atlantic 10	Automatic	21–11
	79	Western Michigan	MAC	Automatic	20–12
	85	Colgate	Patriot	Automatic	19–10
	128	Sacramento State	Big Sky	Automatic	21–11
	167	Chicago State	Northeast	Automatic	19–9

State College Regional
Seed	RPI	School	Conference	Berth type	Record
1	4	Penn State	Big Ten	Automatic	29–2
2	6	Creighton	Big East	Automatic	29–2
3	12	Texas	SEC	Automatic	18–6
4	13	Utah	Big 12	At–Large	24–5
5	20	Marquette	Big East	At–Large	23–8
6	21	USC	Big Ten	At–Large	21–9
7	26	Florida State	ACC	At–Large	21–9
8	27	North Carolina	ACC	At–Large	22–7
	37	Yale	Ivy League	Automatic	19–5
	39	Ole Miss	SEC	At–Large	17–11
	45	UT Arlington	WAC	Automatic	29–2
	47	Florida Gulf Coast	ASUN	Automatic	27–4
	91	Charleston	CAA	Automatic	25–8
	84	Texas A&M–Corpus Christi	Southland	Automatic	20–10
	103	South Dakota	Summit	Automatic	21–9
	205	Delaware State	MEAC	Automatic	17–13

Lincoln Regional
Seed	RPI	School	Conference	Berth type	Record
1	1	Nebraska	Big Ten	At–Large	29–2
2	7	Wisconsin	Big Ten	At–Large	23–6
3	9	Arizona State	Big 12	Automatic	29–2
4	19	Baylor	Big 12	At–Large	22–7
5	14	Dayton	Atlantic 10	At–Large	29–2
6	22	Texas A&M	SEC	Automatic	19–7
7	25	Georgia Tech	ACC	At–Large	20–9
8	33	Miami (FL)	ACC	At–Large	21–10
	29	South Dakota State	Summit	At–Large	27–2
	31	Tennessee	SEC	At–Large	15–11
	59	Colorado State	Mountain West	Automatic	20–10
	50	South Carolina	SEC	At–Large	16–11
	67	Wofford	Southern	Automatic	23–8
	146	New Hampshire	America East	Automatic	18–9
	143	Fairfield	MAAC	Automatic	21–11
	156	Florida A&M	SWAC	Automatic	27–6

RPI as of Nov. 24 2024

== Bracket ==
=== Pittsburgh Regional ===
First Round
1	Pittsburgh	3
Morehead State	0
Pittsburgh, PA
UTEP	2
8	Oklahoma	3
5	TCU	3
Hawaii	0
Eugene, OR
High Point	0
4	Oregon	3
3	Kentucky	3
Cleveland State	0
Lexington, KY
Western Kentucky	1
6	Minnesota	3
7	Missouri	3
Texas State	0
Dallas, TX
Wichita State	0
2	SMU	3

Second Round
1	Pittsburgh	3
8	Oklahoma	0
5	TCU	1
4	Oregon	3
3	Kentucky	3
6	Minnesota	1
7	Missouri	3
2	SMU	1

Regional Semifinals
1	Pittsburgh	3
4	Oregon	2
3	Kentucky	3
7	Missouri	1

Regional Finals
1	Pittsburgh	3
3	Kentucky	0

==== Schedule ====
===== First Round =====
December 6, 2024; 08:00 PM CST	(1) Pittsburgh	3–0	Morehead State	Petersen Events Center, Pittsburgh, PA; Attendance: 5,943; Referees: Wade DuBois, Chuck Fleet, Kristen Hanula, Ryan Lynn
December 6, 2024; 08:00 PM CST	(25–17, 25–15, 25–15); Report			Petersen Events Center, Pittsburgh, PA; Attendance: 5,943; Referees: Wade DuBois, Chuck Fleet, Kristen Hanula, Ryan Lynn

December 6, 2024; 03:00 PM CST	UTEP	2–3	(8) Oklahoma	Petersen Events Center, Pittsburgh, PA; Attendance: 1,537; Referees: Jeff McKinney, Carla Bunner, Christy Alltop, Lawrence Walden
December 6, 2024; 03:00 PM CST	(25–19, 25–22, 19–25, 21–25, 9–15); Report			Petersen Events Center, Pittsburgh, PA; Attendance: 1,537; Referees: Jeff McKinney, Carla Bunner, Christy Alltop, Lawrence Walden

December 5, 2024; 06:00 PM CST	(5) TCU	3–0	Hawaii	Matthew Knight Arena, Eugene, OR; Referees: Tony Chan, Paula Martin, Jennifer McIntosh, Evan Hilberg
December 5, 2024; 06:00 PM CST	(17–25, 18–25, 22-25); Report			Matthew Knight Arena, Eugene, OR; Referees: Tony Chan, Paula Martin, Jennifer McIntosh, Evan Hilberg

December 5, 2024; 08:30 PM CST	High Point	0–3	(4) Oregon	Matthew Knight Arena, Eugene, OR; Attendance: 2,531; Referees: Dan Houser, Marcia Costly, Kelli Demianew, Devin Darrouge
December 5, 2024; 08:30 PM CST	(14–25, 17–25, 21–25); Report			Matthew Knight Arena, Eugene, OR; Attendance: 2,531; Referees: Dan Houser, Marcia Costly, Kelli Demianew, Devin Darrouge

December 5, 2024; 06:30 PM CST	(3) Kentucky	3–0	Cleveland State	Memorial Coliseum, Lexington, KY; Attendance: 2,308; Referees: Wade Brence, Breanna Spain, Jenn Scholten, Jennifer Leffler
December 5, 2024; 06:30 PM CST	(25-15, 25-14, 25-16); Report			Memorial Coliseum, Lexington, KY; Attendance: 2,308; Referees: Wade Brence, Breanna Spain, Jenn Scholten, Jennifer Leffler

December 5, 2024; 03:30 PM CST	Western Kentucky	1–3	(6) Minnesota	Memorial Coliseum, Lexington, KY; Referees: Kevin Wendelboe, Mark Prater, Philip Ems, Jason Schmidt
December 5, 2024; 03:30 PM CST	(22–25, 20–25, 25–19, 23–25); Report			Memorial Coliseum, Lexington, KY; Referees: Kevin Wendelboe, Mark Prater, Philip Ems, Jason Schmidt

December 5, 2024; 04:00 PM CST	(7) Missouri	3–0	Texas State	Moody Coliseum, Dallas, TX; Referees: Chad Klunck, Michelle Prater, Bryce Estes, Kayla Stevenson
December 5, 2024; 04:00 PM CST	(25–16, 25–22, 25–22); Report			Moody Coliseum, Dallas, TX; Referees: Chad Klunck, Michelle Prater, Bryce Estes, Kayla Stevenson

December 5, 2024; 07:00 PM CST	Wichita State	0–3	(2) SMU	Moody Coliseum, Dallas, TX; Attendance: 1,911; Referees: Jana Ter Molen, Rachael Rodriguez, Gerardo Domingaz-Diaz, Blaine Halberstadt
December 5, 2024; 07:00 PM CST	(26–28, 17–25, 14–25); Report			Moody Coliseum, Dallas, TX; Attendance: 1,911; Referees: Jana Ter Molen, Rachael Rodriguez, Gerardo Domingaz-Diaz, Blaine Halberstadt

===== Second Round =====
December 7, 2024	(1) Pittsburgh	3–0	(8) Oklahoma	Petersen Events Center, Pittsburgh, PA; Attendance: 6,647
December 7, 2024	(28–26, 25–21, 25–19); Report			Petersen Events Center, Pittsburgh, PA; Attendance: 6,647

December 6, 2024	(4) Oregon	3–1	(5) TCU	Matthew Knight Arena, Eugene, OR; Attendance: 2,684
December 6, 2024	(19–25, 25–21, 25–11, 25–15); Report			Matthew Knight Arena, Eugene, OR; Attendance: 2,684

December 6, 2024	(3) Kentucky	3–1	(6) Minnesota	Memorial Coliseum, Lexington, KY; Attendance: 2,715
December 6, 2024	(25–11, 23–25, 22–25, 24–26); Report			Memorial Coliseum, Lexington, KY; Attendance: 2,715

December 6, 2024	(2) SMU	1–3	(7) Missouri	Moody Coliseum, University Park, TX; Attendance: 1,957; Referees: Stephen Shepherd, Nikki Kathol, Noah Yi, Talita Benavides
December 6, 2024	(22–25, 25–14, 31–33, 22–25); Report			Moody Coliseum, University Park, TX; Attendance: 1,957; Referees: Stephen Shepherd, Nikki Kathol, Noah Yi, Talita Benavides

===== Regional Semifinals =====
December 12, 2024; 11:00 AM CST	(3) Kentucky	3–1	(7) Missouri	Petersen Events Center, Pittsburgh, PA; Attendance: 1,127; Referees: Stephen Shepherd, Nikki Kathol, Noah Yi, Talita Benavides
December 12, 2024; 11:00 AM CST	(25–20, 25–20, 16–25, 25–13); Report			Petersen Events Center, Pittsburgh, PA; Attendance: 1,127; Referees: Stephen Shepherd, Nikki Kathol, Noah Yi, Talita Benavides

December 12, 2024; 2:30 PM CST	(1) Pittsburgh	3-2	(4) Oregon	Petersen Events Center, Pittsburgh, PA; Attendance: 5,279; Referees: Suzanne Lowry, Kaili Kimura, Peter Thomas, Lawrence Walden
December 12, 2024; 2:30 PM CST	(25-19, 24-26, 25-16, 21-25, 15-12); Report			Petersen Events Center, Pittsburgh, PA; Attendance: 5,279; Referees: Suzanne Lowry, Kaili Kimura, Peter Thomas, Lawrence Walden

===== Regional Final =====
December 14, 2024; 4:00 PM CST	(3) Kentucky	0–3	(1) Pittsburgh	Petersen Events Center, Pittsburgh, PA; Attendance: 9,525; Referees: Suzanne Lowry, Kaili Kimura, Talita Benavides, Peter Thomas
December 14, 2024; 4:00 PM CST	(22–25, 23–25, 17–25); Report			Petersen Events Center, Pittsburgh, PA; Attendance: 9,525; Referees: Suzanne Lowry, Kaili Kimura, Talita Benavides, Peter Thomas

==== Region All-Tournament Team ====
- Olivia Babcock (Most Outstanding Player) – Pittsburgh
- Rachel Fairbanks – Pittsburgh
- Emmy Klika – Pittsburgh
- Brooklyn DeLeye – Kentucky
- Emma Grome – Kentucky
- Michelle Ohwobete – Oregon
- Jordan Iliff – Missouri

=== Louisville Regional ===
First Round
2	Stanford	3
Sacramento State	0
Stanford, CA
Washington	2
7	Loyola Marymount	3
6	Florida	3
NC State	0
Lawrence, KS
Colgate	0
3	Kansas	3
4	Purdue	3
Western Michigan	0
West Lafayette, IN
Loyola Chicago	3
5	BYU	0
8	Northern Iowa	3
Illinois	1
Louisville, KY
Chicago State	0
1	Louisville	3

Second Round
2	Stanford	3
7	Loyola Marymount	0
6	Florida	3
3	Kansas	2
4	Purdue	3
Loyola Chicago	0
8	Northern Iowa	2
1	Louisville	3

Regional Semifinals
2	Stanford	3
6	Florida	1
4	Purdue	0
1	Louisville	3

Regional Finals
2	Stanford	1
1	Louisville	3

==== Schedule ====
===== First Round =====
December 6, 2024; 10:00 PM EST	(2) Stanford	3–0	Sacramento State	Maples Pavilion, Stanford, CA; Attendance: 2,392; Referees: Sergio Gonzalez, Kaili Kimura, Noah Yi, Neal Meredith
December 6, 2024; 10:00 PM EST	(25–19, 25–17, 25–19); Report			Maples Pavilion, Stanford, CA; Attendance: 2,392; Referees: Sergio Gonzalez, Kaili Kimura, Noah Yi, Neal Meredith

December 6, 2024; 07:30 PM EST	Washington	2–3	(7) Loyola Marymount	Maples Pavilion, Stanford, CA; Attendance: 1,012
December 6, 2024; 07:30 PM EST	(18-25, 20-25, 25-23, 25-18, 17-19); Report			Maples Pavilion, Stanford, CA; Attendance: 1,012

December 6, 2024; 05:00 PM EST	(6) Florida	3–0	NC State	Horejsi Family Volleyball Arena, Lawrence, KS; Referees: Suzanne Lowry, Todd Karolczak, Anthony Oligney
December 6, 2024; 05:00 PM EST	(25–18, 25–21, 25–13); Report			Horejsi Family Volleyball Arena, Lawrence, KS; Referees: Suzanne Lowry, Todd Karolczak, Anthony Oligney

December 6, 2024; 07:30 PM EST	Colgate	0-3	(3) Kansas	Horejsi Family Volleyball Arena, Lawrence, KS; Attendance: 1,910
December 6, 2024; 07:30 PM EST	(18-25, 23-25, 22-25)			Horejsi Family Volleyball Arena, Lawrence, KS; Attendance: 1,910

December 5, 2024; 06:30 PM EST	(4) Purdue	3-0	Western Michigan	Holloway Gymnasium, West Lafayette, IN; Attendance: 2,415; Referees: Joe Gustafson, Tim McKinnon, Zac Wiles, Tracy LeVine
December 5, 2024; 06:30 PM EST	(25-21, 25-23, 25-22); Report			Holloway Gymnasium, West Lafayette, IN; Attendance: 2,415; Referees: Joe Gustafson, Tim McKinnon, Zac Wiles, Tracy LeVine

December 5, 2024; 03:30 PM EST	Loyola Chicago	3-0	(5) BYU	Holloway Gymnasium, West Lafayette, IN; Attendance: 2,415; Referees: Brian Hemelgarn, Zach McCrite, Jeff Morris, Matt Knezevich
December 5, 2024; 03:30 PM EST	(25–20, 25–21, 25–17); Report			Holloway Gymnasium, West Lafayette, IN; Attendance: 2,415; Referees: Brian Hemelgarn, Zach McCrite, Jeff Morris, Matt Knezevich

December 6, 2024; 04:00 PM EST	(8) Northern Iowa	3-1	Illinois	KFC Yum! Center, Louisville, KY; Attendance: 4,416; Referees: Jung Park, Michael O'Connor, Jake Rasmaussen, Logan Greer
December 6, 2024; 04:00 PM EST	(25-16, 25-16, 16-25, 25-21)			KFC Yum! Center, Louisville, KY; Attendance: 4,416; Referees: Jung Park, Michael O'Connor, Jake Rasmaussen, Logan Greer

December 6, 2024; 07:00 PM EST	Chicago State	0-3	(1) Louisville	KFC Yum! Center, Louisville, KY; Attendance: 4,416
December 6, 2024; 07:00 PM EST	(10-25, 18-25, 13-25)			KFC Yum! Center, Louisville, KY; Attendance: 4,416

===== Second Round =====
December 6, 2023; 6:00 PM CST	(4) Purdue	3–0	Loyola Chicago	Holloway Gymnasium, West Lafayette, IN; Attendance: 2,415; Referees: Brian Hemelgarn, Joe Gustafson, Zac Wiles, Tracy LeVine
December 6, 2023; 6:00 PM CST	(25–20, 25–21, 25–12); Report			Holloway Gymnasium, West Lafayette, IN; Attendance: 2,415; Referees: Brian Hemelgarn, Joe Gustafson, Zac Wiles, Tracy LeVine

December 7, 2024; 8:00 PM CST	(2) Stanford	3–0	(7) Loyola Marymount	Maples Pavilion, Stanford, CA; Attendance: 2,497; Referees: Sergio Gonzalez, Kaili Kimura, Noah Yi, Neal Meredith
December 7, 2024; 8:00 PM CST	(25–17, 25–17, 25–16); Report			Maples Pavilion, Stanford, CA; Attendance: 2,497; Referees: Sergio Gonzalez, Kaili Kimura, Noah Yi, Neal Meredith

December 7, 2024; 6:30 PM CST	(2) Kansas	2–3	(6) Florida	Horejsi Family Volleyball Arena, Lawrence, KS; Attendance: 1,806; Referees: Marty Prochko, Suzanne Lowry, Ken Corum, Haliegh Lewis
December 7, 2024; 6:30 PM CST	(22–25, 25–21, 17–25, 26–24, 13–15); Report			Horejsi Family Volleyball Arena, Lawrence, KS; Attendance: 1,806; Referees: Marty Prochko, Suzanne Lowry, Ken Corum, Haliegh Lewis

December 7, 2024; 6:00 PM CST	(1) Louisville	3–2	(8) Northern Iowa	KFC Yum Center, Louisville, KY; Attendance: 4,399; Referees: Jung Park, Michael O'Connor, Logan Greer, Jake Rasmaussen
December 7, 2024; 6:00 PM CST	(26–28, 25–22, 23–25, 25–13, 22–20); Report			KFC Yum Center, Louisville, KY; Attendance: 4,399; Referees: Jung Park, Michael O'Connor, Logan Greer, Jake Rasmaussen

===== Regional Semifinals =====
December 12, 2024; 4:00 PM PST	(2) Stanford	3–1	(6) Florida	Freedom Hall, Louisville, KY; Attendance: 4,706; Referees: Michelle Prater, Michael O’Connor, Logan Greer, Tracy LeVine
December 12, 2024; 4:00 PM PST	(24–26, 25–17, 26–24, 29–27); Report			Freedom Hall, Louisville, KY; Attendance: 4,706; Referees: Michelle Prater, Michael O’Connor, Logan Greer, Tracy LeVine

December 12, 2024; 9:30 PM CST	(1) Louisville	3–0	(4) Purdue	Freedom Hall, Louisville, KY; Attendance: 4,706; Referees: Jung Park, Daphne Nelson, Dan Swenson, Zac Wiles
December 12, 2024; 9:30 PM CST	(25–17, 25–18, 25–18); Report			Freedom Hall, Louisville, KY; Attendance: 4,706; Referees: Jung Park, Daphne Nelson, Dan Swenson, Zac Wiles

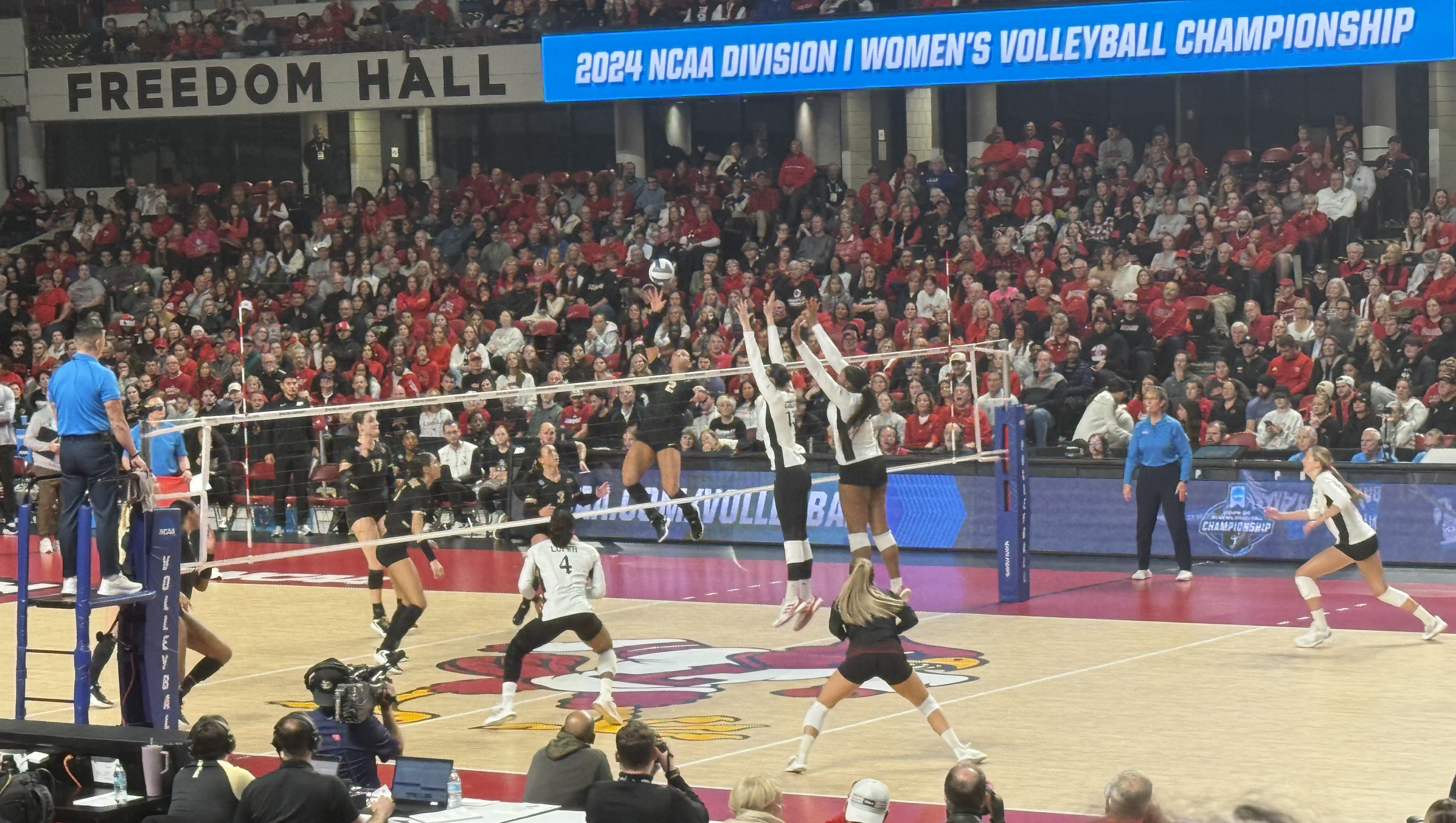
Purdue's Chloe Chicoine (2) attempts to kill the ball against Louisville in the Sweet 16. Louisville's Cara Cresse (13) and Reese Robins (25) attempt to block.

===== Regional Final =====
December 14, 2024; 6:30 PM CST	(2) Stanford	1–3	(1) Louisville	Freedom Hall, Louisville, KY; Attendance: 5,284; Referees: Michelle Prater, Michael O'Connor, Dan Sweensen, Logan Greer
December 14, 2024; 6:30 PM CST	(25–22, 14–25, 26–28, 20–25); Report			Freedom Hall, Louisville, KY; Attendance: 5,284; Referees: Michelle Prater, Michael O'Connor, Dan Sweensen, Logan Greer

==== Region All-Tournament Team ====
- Anna Debeer (Most Outstanding Player) – Louisville
- Charitie Luper – Louisville
- Elena Scott – Louisville

=== University Park Regional ===
First Round
1	Penn State	3
Delaware State	0
State College, PA
Yale	1
8	North Carolina	3
5	Marquette	3
Florida Gulf Coast	0
Salt Lake City, UT
Charleston	0
4	Utah	3
3	Texas	3
Texas A&M–Corpus Christi	0
Austin, TX
UT Arlington	0
6	USC	3
7	Florida State	2
Ole Miss	3
Omaha, NE
South Dakota	0
2	Creighton	3

Second Round
1	Penn State	3
8	North Carolina	1
5	Marquette	3
4	Utah	2
3	Texas	3
6	USC	0
Ole Miss	0
2	Creighton	3

Regional Semifinals
1	Penn State	3
5	Marquette	1
3	Texas	1
2	Creighton	3

Regional Finals
1	Penn State	3
2	Creighton	2

==== Schedule ====
===== First Round =====
December 6, 2024; 06:30 PM CST	(1) Penn State	3–0	Delaware State	Rec Hall, State College, PA; Attendance: 2,516; Referees: Neal Kenzakowski, Mara Wager, Stacey Weitzel
December 6, 2024; 06:30 PM CST	(25–4, 25–20, 25–18); Report			Rec Hall, State College, PA; Attendance: 2,516; Referees: Neal Kenzakowski, Mara Wager, Stacey Weitzel

December 6, 2024; 04:00 PM CST	Yale	1–3	(8) North Carolina	Rec Hall, State College, PA; Attendance: 2,516; Referees: Stephen Shepher, Stacey Weitzel
December 6, 2024; 04:00 PM CST	(25–18, 13–25, 17–25, 20–25); Report			Rec Hall, State College, PA; Attendance: 2,516; Referees: Stephen Shepher, Stacey Weitzel

December 5, 2024; 05:30 PM CST	(5) Marquette	3–0	Florida Gulf Coast	Jon M. Huntsman Center, Salt Lake City, UT; Referees: Lena Gustafson, Daphne Nelson, Kalee Kirby, Doug Swenson
December 5, 2024; 05:30 PM CST	(25–20, 25–22, 25–22); Report			Jon M. Huntsman Center, Salt Lake City, UT; Referees: Lena Gustafson, Daphne Nelson, Kalee Kirby, Doug Swenson

December 5, 2024; 08:30 PM CST	Charleston	0–3	(4) Utah	Jon M. Huntsman Center, Salt Lake City, UT; Attendance: 3,089; Referees: Maile Jewkes, Liz McKnight, James Rees, Kathryn Mecham
December 5, 2024; 08:30 PM CST	(21–25, 19–25, 16–25); Report			Jon M. Huntsman Center, Salt Lake City, UT; Attendance: 3,089; Referees: Maile Jewkes, Liz McKnight, James Rees, Kathryn Mecham

December 5, 2024; 06:30 PM CST	(3) Texas	3–0	Texas A&M–Corpus Christi	Gregory Gymnasium, Austin, TX; Attendance: 3,918; Referees: Joe Lizama, Darin Clark, Tafuna Oney, Laura Cortazar
December 5, 2024; 06:30 PM CST	(25–11, 25–23, 25–12); Report			Gregory Gymnasium, Austin, TX; Attendance: 3,918; Referees: Joe Lizama, Darin Clark, Tafuna Oney, Laura Cortazar

December 5, 2024; 04:00 PM CST	UT Arlington	0–3	(6) USC	Gregory Gymnasium, Austin, TX; Attendance: 1,209; Referees: Charlie Tamez, April Fricke, Talita Benavides, John Tanaka
December 5, 2024; 04:00 PM CST	(24–26, 7–25, 21–25); Report			Gregory Gymnasium, Austin, TX; Attendance: 1,209; Referees: Charlie Tamez, April Fricke, Talita Benavides, John Tanaka

December 5, 2024; 04:30 PM CST	(7) Florida State	2–3	Ole Miss	D. J. Sokol Arena, Omaha, NE; Referees: Brett Myres, Robyn Courchane, Mark Akers, Amber Brown
December 5, 2024; 04:30 PM CST	(25–20, 16–25, 25–23, 25–27, 13–15); Report			D. J. Sokol Arena, Omaha, NE; Referees: Brett Myres, Robyn Courchane, Mark Akers, Amber Brown

December 5, 2024; 07:00 PM CST	South Dakota	0–3	(2) Creighton	D. J. Sokol Arena, Omaha, NE; Attendance: 2,517; Referees: Krystian Krzyzak, Barb Zvonek, John Becker, Anthony White
December 5, 2024; 07:00 PM CST	(10–25, 17–25, 14–25); Report			D. J. Sokol Arena, Omaha, NE; Attendance: 2,517; Referees: Krystian Krzyzak, Barb Zvonek, John Becker, Anthony White

===== Second Round =====
December 6, 2024	(2) Creighton	3–0	Ole Miss	D. J. Sokol Arena, Omaha, NE; Attendance: 2,665
December 6, 2024	(28–26, 27–25, 25–7); Report			D. J. Sokol Arena, Omaha, NE; Attendance: 2,665

December 6, 2024	(3) Texas	3–0	(6) USC	Gregory Gymnasium, Austin, TX; Attendance: 4,137
December 6, 2024	(26–24, 25–20, 25–22); Report			Gregory Gymnasium, Austin, TX; Attendance: 4,137

December 6, 2024	(4) Utah	2–3	(5) Marquette	Jon M. Huntsman Center, Salt Lake City, UT; Attendance: 2,290
December 6, 2024	(23–25, 22–25, 25–18, 26–24, 12–15); Report			Jon M. Huntsman Center, Salt Lake City, UT; Attendance: 2,290

December 7, 2024	(1) Penn State	3–1	(8) North Carolina	Rec Hall, University Park, PA; Attendance: 2,470
December 7, 2024	(25–21, 25–18, 20–25, 25–15); Report			Rec Hall, University Park, PA; Attendance: 2,470

===== Regional Semifinals =====
December 13, 2024; 12:00 PM CST	(2) Creighton	3–1	(3) Texas	Rec Hall, University Park, PA; Referees: Devonie McLarty, Bill Stanley, Paula Martin
December 13, 2024; 12:00 PM CST	(24–26, 25–19, 25–21, 25–20); Report			Rec Hall, University Park, PA; Referees: Devonie McLarty, Bill Stanley, Paula Martin

December 13, 2024; 2:50 PM CST	(1) Penn State	3–1	(5) Marquette	Rec Hall, University Park, PA; Attendance: 2,914; Referees: Ron Pelham, Paula Martin, Bill Stanley
December 13, 2024; 2:50 PM CST	(25–15, 25–21, 24–26, 25–20); Report			Rec Hall, University Park, PA; Attendance: 2,914; Referees: Ron Pelham, Paula Martin, Bill Stanley

===== Regional Final =====
December 15, 2024; 7:30 PM CST	(1) Penn State	3–2	(2) Creighton	Rec Hall, University Park, PA; Attendance: 3,558; Referees: Devonie McLarty, Bill Stanley, Paula Martin
December 15, 2024; 7:30 PM CST	(25–15, 16–25, 25–22, 20–25, 15–7); Report			Rec Hall, University Park, PA; Attendance: 3,558; Referees: Devonie McLarty, Bill Stanley, Paula Martin

==== Region All-Tournament Team ====
- Jess Mruzik (Most Outstanding Player) – Penn State
- Gillian Grimes – Penn State
- Camryn Hannah – Penn State
- Izzy Starck – Penn State
- Ava Martin – Creighton
- Norah Sis – Creighton
- Madisen Skinner – Texas

=== Lincoln Regional ===
First Round
2	Wisconsin	3
Fairfield	0
Madison, WI
Tennessee	2
7	Georgia Tech	3
6	Texas A&M	3
Colorado State	1
Tempe, AZ
New Hampshire	0
3	Arizona State	3
4	Baylor	3
Wofford	0
Waco, TX
South Carolina	1
5	Dayton	3
8	Miami (FL)	3
South Dakota State	0
Lincoln, NE
Florida A&M	0
1	Nebraska	3

Second Round
2	Wisconsin	3
7	Georgia Tech	1
6	Texas A&M	3
3	Arizona State	1
4	Baylor	2
5	Dayton	3
8	Miami (FL)	0
1	Nebraska	3

Regional Semifinals
2	Wisconsin	3
6	Texas A&M	2
5	Dayton	1
1	Nebraska	3

Regional Finals
2	Wisconsin	0
1	Nebraska	3

==== Schedule ====
===== First Round =====
December 5, 2024; 08:00 PM EST	(2) Wisconsin	3-0	Fairfield	Wisconsin Field House, Madison, WI; Attendance: 6,050; Referees: Devonie McLarty, Rod Rodriguez, Scott Prox, Melissa Rammer
December 5, 2024; 08:00 PM EST	(25-16, 25-16, 25-14); Report			Wisconsin Field House, Madison, WI; Attendance: 6,050; Referees: Devonie McLarty, Rod Rodriguez, Scott Prox, Melissa Rammer

December 5, 2024; 05:30 PM EST	Tennessee	2-3	(7) Georgia Tech	Wisconsin Field House, Madison, WI; Attendance: 7,729; Referees: Christina Fiebich, Jim Kuziela, Peter Thomas, Cinque Robinson
December 5, 2024; 05:30 PM EST	(18-25, 25-13, 30-32, 28-26, 12-15); Report			Wisconsin Field House, Madison, WI; Attendance: 7,729; Referees: Christina Fiebich, Jim Kuziela, Peter Thomas, Cinque Robinson

December 6, 2024; 06:30 PM EST	(6) Texas A&M	3-1	Colorado State	Desert Financial Arena, Tempe, AZ; Attendance: 1,613; Referees: Ron Pelham, Nikki Kathol, Dan Swensen, Ryan Fieckert
December 6, 2024; 06:30 PM EST	(25-20, 16-25, 29-27, 25-23)			Desert Financial Arena, Tempe, AZ; Attendance: 1,613; Referees: Ron Pelham, Nikki Kathol, Dan Swensen, Ryan Fieckert

December 6, 2024; 08:30 PM EST	New Hampshire	0-3	(3) Arizona State	Desert Financial Arena, Tempe, AZ; Attendance: 3,301
December 6, 2024; 08:30 PM EST	(17-25, 17-25, 19-25)			Desert Financial Arena, Tempe, AZ; Attendance: 3,301

December 5, 2024; 08:00 PM EST	(4) Baylor	3-0	Wofford	Ferrell Center, Waco, TX; Attendance: 836; Referees: Brad Aaberg, Dave Dufrene, John Stadnick, Sheri Banwart
December 5, 2024; 08:00 PM EST	(25-11, 25-11, 25-18); Report			Ferrell Center, Waco, TX; Attendance: 836; Referees: Brad Aaberg, Dave Dufrene, John Stadnick, Sheri Banwart

December 5, 2024; 05:30 PM EST	South Carolina	1-3	(5) Dayton	Ferrell Center, Waco, TX; Referees: Thang Nguyen, Cindy Thompson, Thomas Walkoviak, Chris Gill
December 5, 2024; 05:30 PM EST	(20-25, 15-25, 26-24, 10-25)			Ferrell Center, Waco, TX; Referees: Thang Nguyen, Cindy Thompson, Thomas Walkoviak, Chris Gill

December 6, 2024; 05:30 PM EST	(8) Miami (FL)	3-0	South Dakota State	Bob Devaney Sports Center, Lincoln, NE; Referees: Pati Rolf, Craig Wiedel, Mike Behrens, Sarah Myres
December 6, 2024; 05:30 PM EST	(25-17, 25-23, 25-15)			Bob Devaney Sports Center, Lincoln, NE; Referees: Pati Rolf, Craig Wiedel, Mike Behrens, Sarah Myres

December 6, 2024; 08:00 PM EST	Florida A&M	0-3	(1) Nebraska	Bob Devaney Sports Center, Lincoln, NE; Attendance: 8,702
December 6, 2024; 08:00 PM EST	(3-25, 9-25, 17-25)			Bob Devaney Sports Center, Lincoln, NE; Attendance: 8,702

===== Second Round =====
December 6, 2024	(2) Wisconsin	3–1	(7) Georgia Tech	Wisconsin Field House, Madison, WI; Attendance: 7,229
December 6, 2024	(25–27, 25–20, 25–23, 25–21); Report			Wisconsin Field House, Madison, WI; Attendance: 7,229

December 6, 2024	(4) Baylor	2–3	(5) Dayton	Ferrell Center, Waco, TX; Attendance: 1,022
December 6, 2024	(22–25, 25–22, 26–24, 21–25, 12–15); Report			Ferrell Center, Waco, TX; Attendance: 1,022

December 7, 2024	(1) Nebraska	3–0	(8) Miami (FL)	Bob Devaney Sports Center, Lincoln, NE; Attendance: 8,684
December 7, 2024	(25–19, 25–14, 25–18); Report			Bob Devaney Sports Center, Lincoln, NE; Attendance: 8,684

December 7, 2024	(3) Arizona State	1–3	(6) Texas A&M	Desert Financial Arena, Tempe, AZ; Attendance: 3,322
December 7, 2024	(19–25, 25–22, 15–25, 22–25); Report			Desert Financial Arena, Tempe, AZ; Attendance: 3,322

===== Regional Semifinals =====
December 13, 2024; 6:00 PM CST	(2) Wisconsin	3–2	(6) Texas A&M	Bob Devaney Sports Center, Lincoln, NE; Referees: Pati Rolf, Joseph Gustafson, Scott Prox, Brianna Spain
December 13, 2024; 6:00 PM CST	(25–21, 18–25, 25–19, 23–25, 15–13); Report			Bob Devaney Sports Center, Lincoln, NE; Referees: Pati Rolf, Joseph Gustafson, Scott Prox, Brianna Spain

December 13, 2024; 9:15 PM CST	(1) Nebraska	3–1	(5) Dayton	Bob Devaney Sports Center, Lincoln, NE; Attendance: 8,725; Referees: Sergio Gonzales, Brianna Spain, Sarah Myres, Doug Swensen
December 13, 2024; 9:15 PM CST	(25–17, 25–18, 25–27, 25–13); Report			Bob Devaney Sports Center, Lincoln, NE; Attendance: 8,725; Referees: Sergio Gonzales, Brianna Spain, Sarah Myres, Doug Swensen

===== Regional Final =====
December 15, 2024; 2:00 PM CST	(2) Wisconsin	0–3	(1) Nebraska	Bob Devaney Sports Center, Lincoln, NE; Attendance: 8,743; Referees: Pati Rolf, Brianna Spain, Sarah Myres, Nathan Wagner
December 15, 2024; 2:00 PM CST	(24–26, 17–25, 21–25); Report			Bob Devaney Sports Center, Lincoln, NE; Attendance: 8,743; Referees: Pati Rolf, Brianna Spain, Sarah Myres, Nathan Wagner

==== Region All-Tournament Team ====
- Harper Murray (Most Outstanding Player) – Nebraska
- Andi Jackson – Nebraska
- Bergen Reilly – Nebraska
- Lexi Rodriguez – Nebraska
- Sarah Franklin – Wisconsin
- Lexie Almodovar – Dayton
- Logan Lednicky – Texas A&M

== Final Four ==
National Semifinals; KFC Yum! Center; December 19
1	Pittsburgh	1
1	Louisville	3
1	Penn State	3
1	Nebraska	2

National Championship; KFC Yum! Center; December 22
1	Louisville	1
1	Penn State	3

=== National semifinals ===
December 19, 2024; 6:30 PM EST	(1) Pittsburgh	1–3	(1) Louisville	KFC Yum! Center, Louisville, Kentucky; Attendance: 21,726; Referees: Pati Rolf, Bill Stanley, Sarah Myres, Rachel Jensen
December 19, 2024; 6:30 PM EST	(25–21, 23–25, 27–29, 17–25); Report			KFC Yum! Center, Louisville, Kentucky; Attendance: 21,726; Referees: Pati Rolf, Bill Stanley, Sarah Myres, Rachel Jensen

December 19, 2024; 9:45 PM EST	(1) Penn State	3–2	(1) Nebraska	KFC Yum! Center, Louisville, Kentucky; Attendance: 21,726; Referees: Suzanne Lowry, Kaili Kimura, Talita Benavides, Dan Swensen
December 19, 2024; 9:45 PM EST	(23–25, 18–25, 25–23, 28–26, 15–13); Report			KFC Yum! Center, Louisville, Kentucky; Attendance: 21,726; Referees: Suzanne Lowry, Kaili Kimura, Talita Benavides, Dan Swensen

==== Game recap ====
===== Semifinal 1: Pittsburgh vs. Louisville =====
The opening set was back-and-forth, it was tied 14–14 before Pittsburgh responded with a run to go up 23–16 before winning 25–21. The second set was also close, tied at 19–19, Pittsburgh would eventually take the lead 22–21 before Louisville tied it up at 23–23 after a block from senior All-American Anna DeBeer. Louisville would win the second set 25–23 to even the match at one set a piece. In the third set, Louisville won in extra points, 29–27, to take the 2–1 lead. Despite DeBeer going down with an ankle injury in the beginning of set 4, Louisville rushed out to a 9–3 lead, eventually going up 21–13. Louisville would win the fourth set 25–17 and advanced to the championship match for the second time in three seasons. Louisville was led by its outside hitter trio of DeBeer, Charitie Luper, and Sofia Maldonado Diaz, who all recorded 14 kills each. Pittsburgh was led by AVCA National Player of the Year Olivia Babcock, who had a career-high 33 kills in the match.

===== Semifinal 2: Penn State vs. Nebraska =====
Penn State and Nebraska were meeting for the second time in just 3 weeks, as Penn State defeated Nebraska 3–1 in their final regular-season conference matchup to secure a share of the conference title.

The opening set was close, with Nebraska edging out Penn State 25–23. Nebraska won the second set relatively easy, 25–18, going up 2–0 and looking poised to advance to the championship. Penn State went on a 5–0 run in the third set to take the lead, and eventually won, 25–23. In the fourth set, Nebraska went on a run to take a commanding 22–16 lead. Despite only having a 0.3% chance to win the match at that point, Penn State chipped away at Nebraska's lead. Nebraska had two match point opportunities at 24–22, but Penn State tied it at 24–24. Penn State eventually won the fourth set, 28–26, to force a fifth set. In the fifth set, Penn State was able to maintain at least a 1-point lead throughout most of the set, and eventually won on a final kill from senior outside hitter Camryn Hannah, 15–13. The win was only the second reverse sweep (when a team wins in 5 sets after being down 0–2) in the Final Four since Penn State accomplished same in the 2009 NCAA title match vs. Texas. Penn State was led by senior outside hitter Jess Mruzik and redshirt freshman Caroline Jurevicius, who had 26 kills and 20 kills, respectively. Nebraska was led by sophomore outside hitter Harper Murray and sophomore middle blocker Andi Jackson, who had 20 and 19 kills, respectively.

=== National championship ===
December 22, 2024; 3:00 p.m. EST	(1) Louisville	1–3	(1) Penn State	KFC Yum! Center, Louisville, Kentucky; Attendance: 21,860; Referees: Suzanne Lowry, Bill Stanley, Sarah Myres, Dan Swensen
December 22, 2024; 3:00 p.m. EST	(23–25, 34–32, 20–25, 17–25); Report			KFC Yum! Center, Louisville, Kentucky; Attendance: 21,860; Referees: Suzanne Lowry, Bill Stanley, Sarah Myres, Dan Swensen

=== Final Four All-Tournament Team ===
The following players were named to the final four all-tournament team:

- Jess Mruzik (Penn State) – Most Outstanding Player
- Camryn Hannah (Penn State)
- Gillian Grimes (Penn State)
- Charitie Luper (Louisville)
- Sofia Maldonado Diaz (Louisville)
- Harper Murray (Nebraska)
- Olivia Babcock (Pittsburgh)

== Media coverage ==
=== Rounds 1 & 2 ===
All matches were televised on ESPN+:

- Pittsburgh: Jeff Hathhorn, Kelsey Bonk, Amanda Silay
- Lincoln: Larry Punteney, Kathi Wieskamp
- University Park: Kasey Kreider, Jack Rachinsky
- Louisville: Jeff Milby, Stephanie Cantway
- Palo Alto: Kevin Danna, Naya Crittenden
- Omaha: Shannon Smolinski, Jon Schriner
- Madison: Joey Bonadonna, Kate McGrann
- Dallas: Chris Mycoskie, Jill Kramer
- Lexington: Dick Gabriel, Stephanie Niemer
- Tempe: Braiden Bell, Gavin Schall
- Austin: Lincoln Rose, Shelby Coppedge
- Lawrence: Leif Lisec, Jill Dorsey-Hall
- West Lafayette: Craig Combs, Max Bury
- Salt Lake City: Jim Watson, Victoria Dennis
- Waco: Hannah Sedwick, Mike Leslie
- Eugene: Saul Galvan, Lily Crane

=== Regional semifinals & Regional Finals ===
All matches televised on ESPN+ & ESPN2, with the Nebraska/Wisconsin regional also being nationally televised on ABC

- Pittsburgh: Ann Marie Anderson, Nicole Branagh, Michella Chester
- Lincoln: Courtney Lyle, Holly McPeak, Katie George, Madison Fitzpatrick
- University Park: Paul Sunderland, Missy Whittemore, Shelby Coppedge
- Louisville: Eric Frede, Emily Ehman, Ciara Michel

=== Semifinals & National Championship ===
The semifinal games were televised on both ESPN and ESPN+, while the national championship game was televised on ESPN3, ESPN+, and ABC.

- Semifinals: Courtney Lyle, Holly McPeak, Katie George, Madison Fitzpatrick, Emily Ehman, Michella Chester

- Finals: Courtney Lyle, Holly McPeak, Katie George, Christine Williamson, Madison Fitzpatrick, Michella Chester, Emily Ehman

== Records by Conference ==
Overview of conference performance in the 2024 NCAA Division I women's volleyball tournament
Conference	Bids	Record	Win %	R32	S16	E8	F4	CG	NC
Big Ten	9	19–8	.704	7	5	3	2	1	1
ACC	9	16–9	.640	7	3	3	2	1	–
Big East	2	5–2	.714	2	2	1	–	–	–
SEC	9	13–9	.590	7	5	1	–	–	–
Atlantic 10	2	3–2	.600	2	1	–	–	–	–
Big 12	6	5–6	.454	5	–	–	–	–	–
Missouri Valley	1	1–1	.500	1	–	–	–	–	–
WCC	1	1–1	.500	1	–	–	–	–	–
C-USA	2	0–2	.000	–	–	–	–	–	–
Others	22	0–22	.000	–	–	–	–	–	–

- The following conferences had a single team that failed to advance beyond the round of 64: American, America East, ASUN, Big Sky, Big South, Big West, CAA, Horizon, Ivy League, MAAC, MEAC, MWC, MAC, Northeast, Ohio Valley, Patriot, SoCon, Southland, SWAC, Summit, Sun Belt, WAC. The conference's records have been consolidated in the other row.
