= Michigan Wolverines women's volleyball =

Woman's volleyball team of the University of Michigan

- University: University of Michigan
- Head coach: Erin Virtue
- Conference: Big Ten
- Location: Ann Arbor, Michigan, US
- Home arena: Cliff Keen Arena (capacity: 1,800)
- Nickname: Wolverines
- Colors: Maize and blue

AIAW/NCAA tournament semifinal
- 2012

AIAW/NCAA Regional Final
- 2009, 2012

AIAW/NCAA regional semifinal
- 2007, 2008, 2009, 2011, 2012, 2016, 2018

AIAW/NCAA tournament appearance
- 1981, 1997, 1999, 2000, 2002, 2003, 2004, 2006, 2007, 2008, 2009, 2010, 2011, 2012, 2013, 2015, 2016, 2017, 2018, 2019, 2021, 2025

Conference regular season champion
- 1981

The Michigan Wolverines women's volleyball team represents the University of Michigan in National Collegiate Athletic Association (NCAA) Division I competition. The women's volleyball program at the University of Michigan began in 1973. Erin Virtue has been the coach since 2023. The team plays its home matches at Cliff Keen Arena.

== History ==
=== Vong years (1973–1983) ===
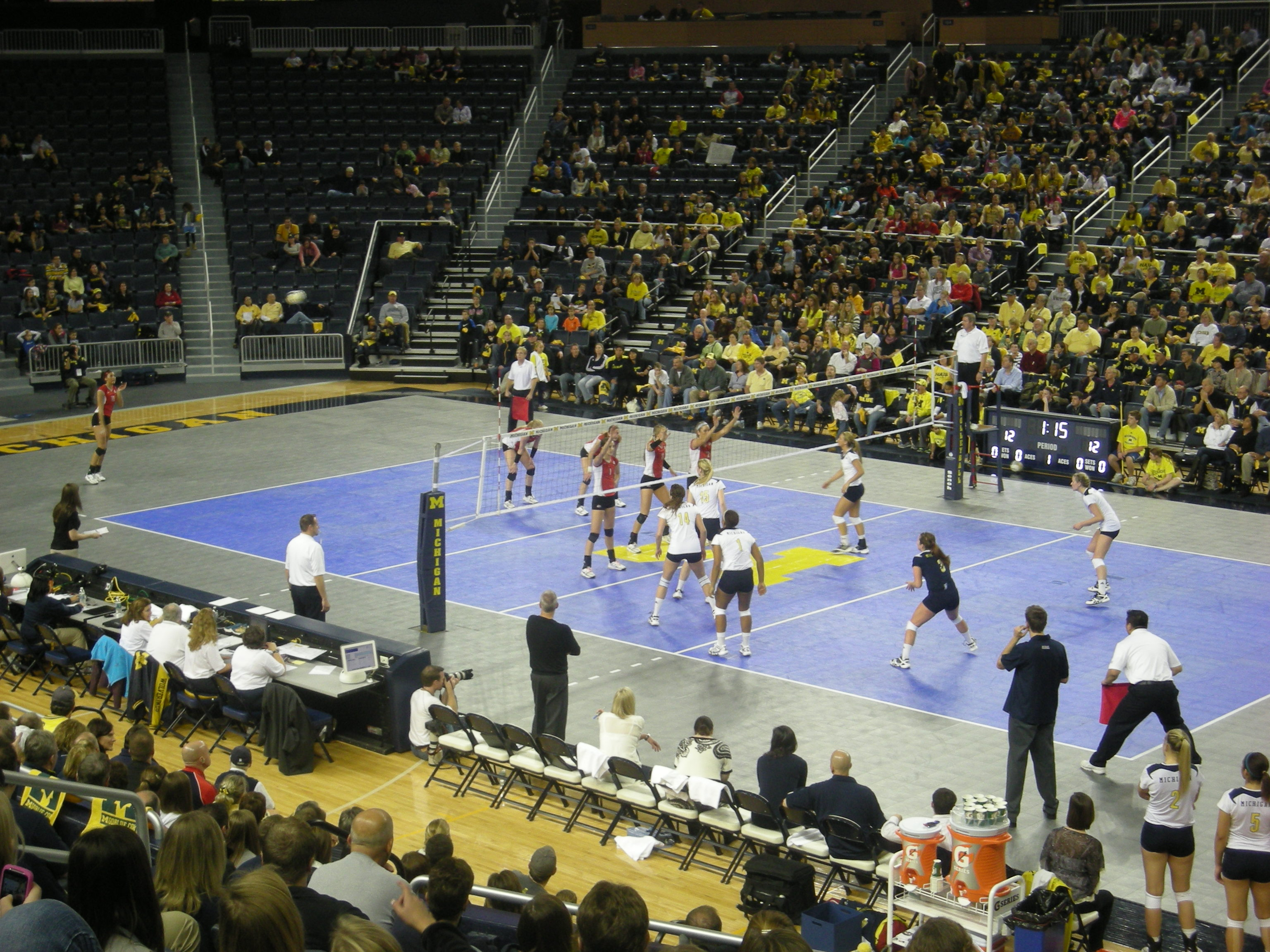
Michigan vs. Ohio State, 2011

Sandy Vong was the first head coach of the Michigan Wolverines women's volleyball program. He held the position for 11 years from 1973 to 1983. Vong's 1981 team compiled a 40–17 record, captured the school's first Big Ten Conference volleyball championship, won the AIAW Regional Championship, and finished in eighth place at the AIAW National Championship.

=== Three coaches (1984–1991) ===
During the eight years from 1984 to 1991, the Michigan women's volleyball program had three head coaches: Barb Canning (1984–1985), Joyce Davis (1986–1989), and Peggy Bradley-Doppes (1990–1991). The team compiled a winning record in only one of those eight years, a 19-12 finish in 1991.

=== Giovanazzi years (1992–1998) ===
In 1992, Peggy Bradley-Doppes stepped down as Michigan's head volleyball coach to focus on her duties as the school's women's athletic director. Greg Giovanazzi, a former All-American volleyball player at UCLA, was hired to replace her. Giovanazzi led the team for seven years from 1992 to 1998. The 1997 Michigan team reached the 20-win level for the first time since 1987 and was the subject of a profile in the Chicago Tribune indicating that the program was experiencing a renaissance. The 1997 team ultimately compiled a 21–12 record, finished in third place in the Big Ten, and advanced to the NCAA Tournament for the first time in the program's history. The team lost to Texas A&M in the second round of the 1997 tournament.

Interest in the sport at Michigan declined after the 1997 season, with average home attendance dropping to less than 600 during the 1998 season. Giovanazzi was replaced as Michigan's head volleyball coach after the 1998 season.

=== Rosen years (1999–2022) ===
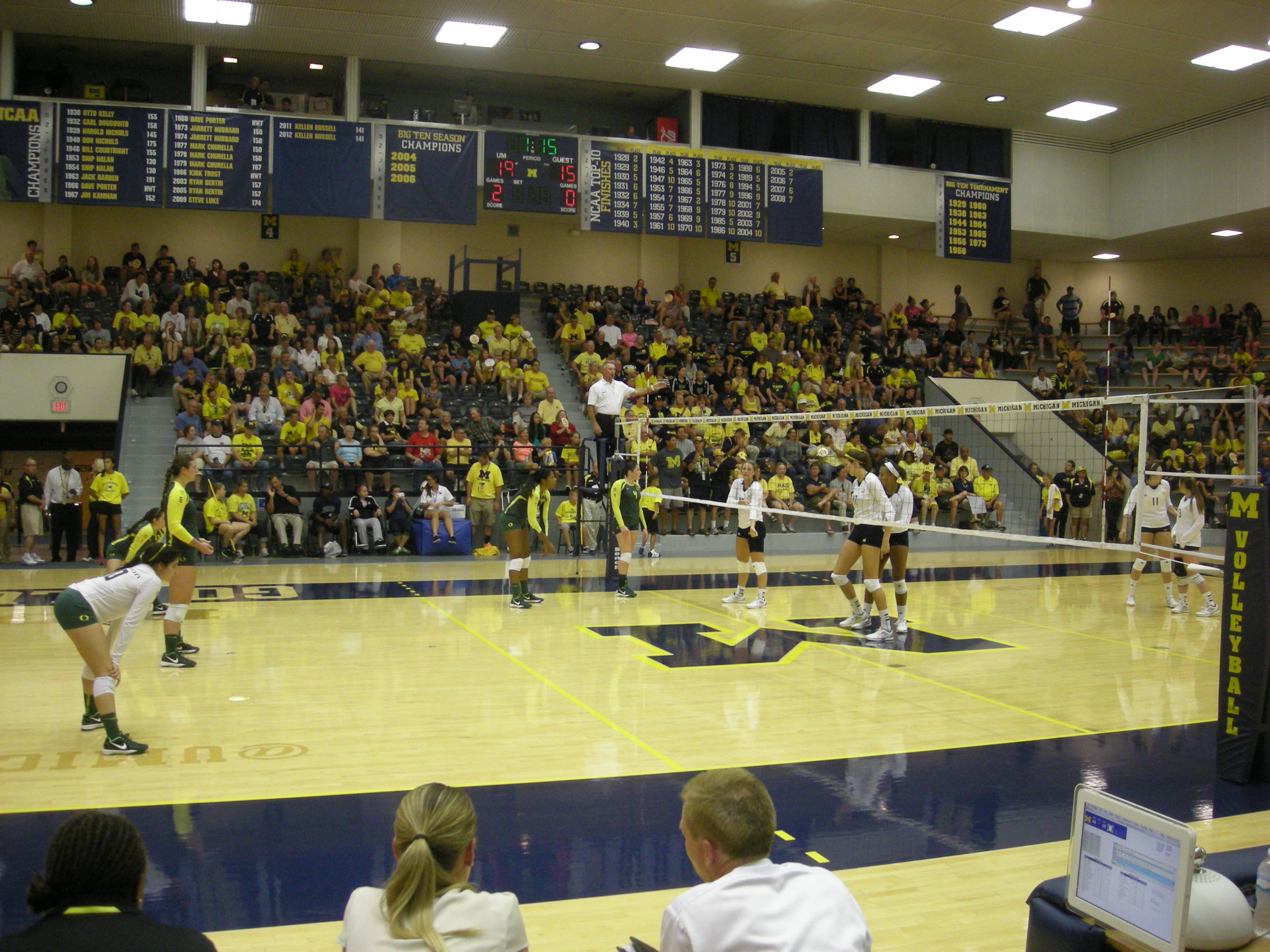
Michigan vs. Oregon, 2013

Mark Rosen was hired as the head coach of the Michigan Wolverines women's volleyball team in 1999. He had previously been a volleyball coach at Cal State Bakersfield (1992–93), Northern Michigan University (1994–97) and Boise State University (1998) Since taking over the program, Rosen has led the Wolverines to national prominence. His teams have advanced to the NCAA Tournament in 12 of his first 14 years as head coach and have reached the 20-win level for seven consecutive years from 2006 to 2012. Between 2006 and 2012, the team has compiled an overall record of 170–67 (.717).

In 2008, Rosen broke Sandy Vong's team record for career wins at Michigan. The 2008 team compiled a 26–9 record, marking the first time the team had reached 20 wins in three consecutive seasons.

In 2009, Rosen's team compiled a 27–10 record, defeated No. 4-ranked Stanford in the second round of the NCAA Tournament, and ultimately advanced to the Elite Eight round of the NCAA Tournament.

In 2011, Michigan again defeated Stanford in the NCAA Tournament, reaching the Round of 16. In 2012, the team compiled a 27–12 record and advanced to the National Semifinal round of the NCAA Tournament for the first time in program history.

In June 2013, the Michigan women's volleyball team toured Argentina and Brazil and played 10 matches against local teams. The Wolverines compiled a 9–1 record on their South American tour. The final three matches were against the Brazilian Youth National Team, and Michigan won two of the three matches.

After the 2022 season, Michigan athletic director Warde Manuel announced that Rosen would not return for the 2023 season, after 24 seasons as the head coach.

=== Virtue years (2023–present) ===
On January 17, 2023, Erin Virtue was hired as the head coach to replace Rosen. Prior to Michigan, Virtue was the offensive coordinator for the United States women's national volleyball team, and the director of the USA National Team Development Program. Virtue had also previously served as an assistant coach at Michigan from 2011 to 2015 as well as Northwestern (2016–18), Cincinnati (2007–10), and Loyola Chicago (2006).

== Coaching staff ==
Name	Position coached	Consecutive season at Michigan in current position
Erin Virtue	Head coach	1st
Benavia Jenkins	Associate head coach	1st
Dan Pawlikowski	Associate head coach	1st
Coley Pawlikowski	Director of Volleyball Operations	1st

== Facilities ==
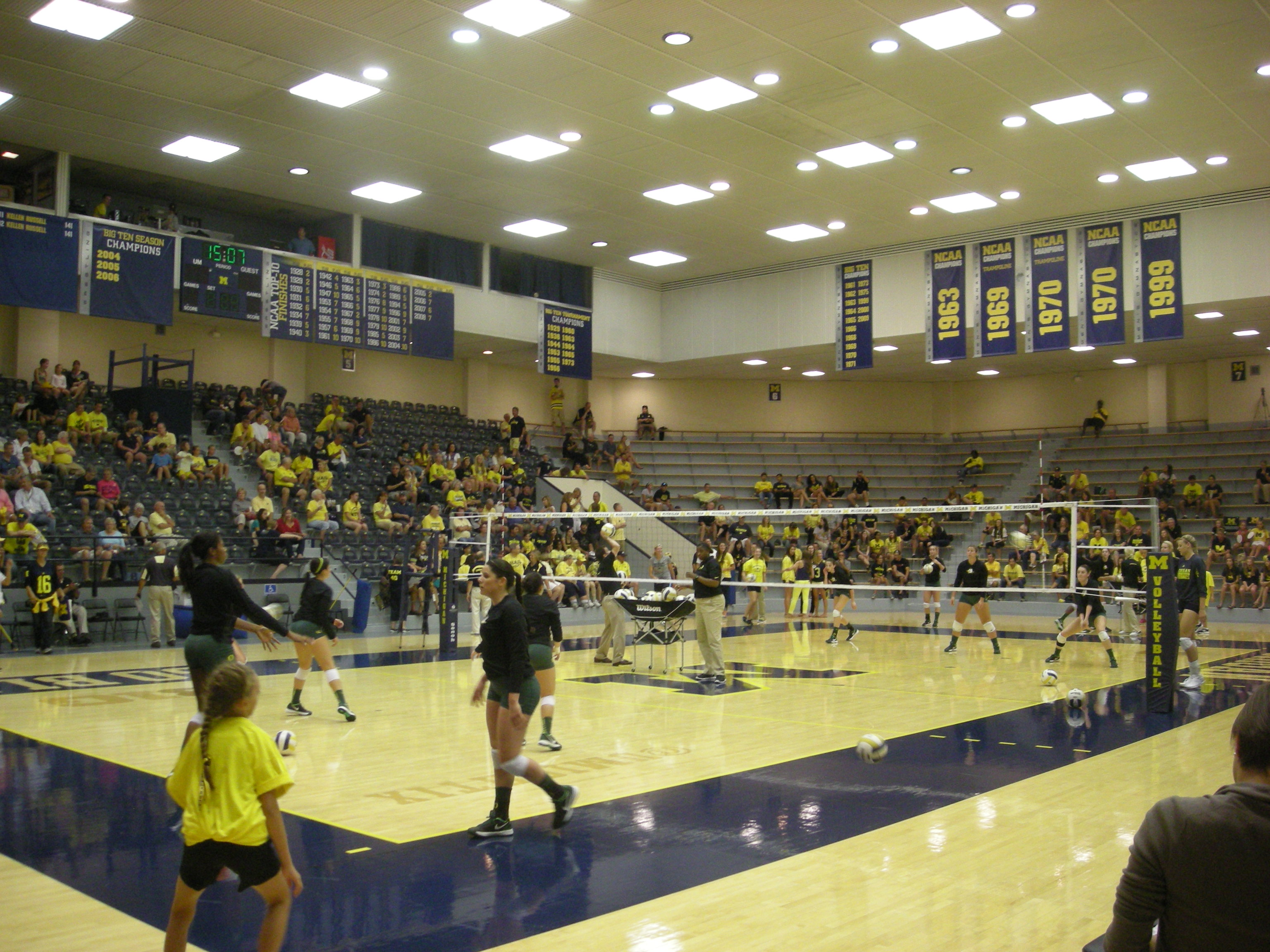
Cliff Keen Arena as it appeared during the 2013 season

Since 1989, the team has played its home matches at Cliff Keen Arena located on Hoover Street in the school's athletic campus between the Administration Building and the Intramural Building. The facility has a seating capacity of 1,800 and is also used by Michigan's men's gymnastics and wrestling teams. It was built in 1956 for the Michigan swimming and diving team and was known as the Matt Mann Pool from 1956 to 1988 and as Varsity Arena from 1988 to 1989.

== Coaching records ==
The Michigan women's volleyball team has had six head coaches since it was established in 1973. Their coaching records are as follows:

#	Name	Years	Seasons	OW	OL	OT	O%	CW	CL	CT	C%	Conf. Titles	NCAA Berths
1	Sandy Vong	1973–1983	11	177	150	7	.540	7	19	0	.269	1	0
2	Barb Canning	1984–1985	2	29	34	0	.460	7	24	0	.226	0	0
3	Joyce Davis	1986–1989	4	50	83	0	.376	8	64	0	.111	0	0
4	Peggy Bradley-Doppes	1990–1991	2	25	37	0	.403	12	26	0	.316	0	0
5	Greg Giovanazzi	1992–1998	7	104	116	0	.473	59	81	0	.421	0	1
6	Mark Rosen	1999–2022	24	468	299	0	.610	229	244	0	.484	0	19
7	Erin Virtue	2023–present	0	0	0	0	–	0	0	0	–	0	0
Total			50	853	719	7	.542	322	458	0	.413	1	20

== Notable players ==
=== AVCA All-Americans ===
In 2003, Erin Moore became the first Michigan volleyball player to be selected as an All-American by the American Volleyball Coaches Association (AVCA). In 2009, Lexi Zimmerman became Michigan's first player to receive first-team All-America honors. In total, 16 Michigan women's volleyball players have received All-American recognition from the AVCA 24 times.

- Erin Moore – 2003 (third team)
- Katie Bruzdzinski – 2006 (honorable mention), 2007 (honorable mention)
- Lexi Zimmerman – 2007 (honorable mention), 2008 (second team), 2009 (first team), 2010 (second team)
- Juliana Paz – 2009 (third team)
- Alex Hunt – 2010 (third team)
- Jennifer Cross – 2012 (third team)
- Lexi Erwin – 2012 (honorable mention)
- Molly Toon – 2013 (honorable mention)
- Lexi Dannemiller – 2013 (honorable mention)
- Abby Cole – 2014 (honorable mention), 2015 (second team), 2016 (second team)
- MacKenzi Welsh – 2016 (honorable mention), 2019 (honorable mention)
- Claire Kieffer-Wright – 2017 (honorable mention)
- Carly Skjodt – 2017 (third team), 2018 (second team)
- Jenna Lerg – 2018 (honorable mention)
- Paige Jones – 2019 (third team)
- Jess Mruzik – 2021 (honorable mention)

=== Big Ten Medal of Honor ===
Three Michigan women's volleyball players have won the Big Ten Medal of Honor.

- Alison Noble – 1984
- Andrea Williams – 1985
- Shareen Luze – 1997

=== Big Ten Defensive Player of the Year ===
- Stesha Selsky – 2007

=== All-Big Ten ===
Nineteen Michigan women's volleyball players have received All-Big Ten Conference recognition.

- Michelle Horrigan – 1991 (second team), 1992 (second team)
- Shannon Brownlee – 1995 (first team)
- Linnea Mendoza – 1997 (first team)
- Erin Moore – 2002 (first team), 2003 (first team)
- Lisa Gamalaski – 2004 (first team)
- Katie Bruzdzinski – 2006 (first team), 2007 (first team)
- Lexi Zimmerman – 2008 (first team), 2009 (first team), 2010 (first team)
- Juliana Paz – 2009 (first team)
- Alex Hunt – 2010 (first team)
- Jennifer Cross – 2012 (first team), 2013 (first team)
- Lexi Erwin – 2012 (first team)
- Abby Cole - 2014 (first team), 2015 (first team), 2016 (first team)
- Carly Skjodt - 2017 (first team), 2018 (first team)
- Jenna Lerg - 2018 (second team)
- Paige Jones – 2019 (first team)
- MacKenzi Welsh – 2019 (first team)
- Cori Crocker – 2019 (second team)
- Jess Mruzik – 2021 (first team), 2022 (first team)
- Hannah Grant – 2022 (second team)

== Individual records ==
Michigan team records are based on the Michigan Volleyball Record Book.

=== Kills ===
- Match: Paige Jones (37) vs. Indiana 3/12/21
- Season: Lexi Erwin – 614 in 2012
- Career: Katie Bruzdzinski – 1,895 from 2004 to 2007

=== Attack attempts ===
- Match: Lexi Erwin – 87 vs. Texas 12/13/12
- Season: Lexi Erwin – 1,701 in 2021
- Career: Katie Bruzdzinski – 5,097 from 2004 to 2007

=== Hitting percentage ===
- Match: Jacque Boney – .813 vs. Rutgers 9/23/22
- Season: Abby Cole – .359 in 2014
- Career: Jess Robinson – .341 from 2019 to 2022

=== Assists ===
- Match: Linnea Mendoza – 95 vs. Illinois 11/29/96
- Season: Lexi Zimmerman – 1,685 in 2007
- Career: Lexi Zimmerman – 5,903 from 2007 to 2010

=== Digs ===
- Match: Jayne Hickman – 43 vs. Wisconsin 9/21/85
- Season: Stesha Selsky – 762 in 2007
- Career: Stesha Selsky – 2,178 from 2004 to 2007

=== Total blocks ===
- Match: Kim Clover – 14 vs. Northwestern 9/24/88
- Season: Jennifer Cross – 181 in 2012
- Career: Jennifer Cross – 543 from 2010 to 2013

=== Service aces ===
- Match: Alex Hunt – 9 vs. Marquette 9/18/09
- Season: Lisa Vahi – 78 in 1986
- Career: Marie Ann Davidson – 239 from 1985 to 1988

=== Matches played ===
- Career: Tie between Lexi Zimmerman – 140 from 2007 to 2010 and Sloane Donhoff - 140 from 2008 to 2011

== See also ==
- List of NCAA Division I women's volleyball programs
