= Jess Mruzik =

American volleyball player (born 2002)

Personal information
- Full name: Jessica Ann Mruzik
- Born: June 15, 2002 (age 24)
- Hometown: Livonia, Michigan
- Height: 6 ft 1 in (185 cm)
- Education: Michigan (2020–2022); Penn State (2023–2024)

Volleyball information
- Position: Outside hitter
- Current club: LOVB Houston
- Number: 3

Career
Years	Teams
2025–	LOVB Houston

Jessica Ann Mruzik (born June 15, 2002) is an American professional volleyball player for LOVB Houston. She played college volleyball for the Michigan Wolverines and the Penn State Nittany Lions, which she led to the 2024 national championship. She was named first-team All-Big Ten four times and first-team AVCA All-American in her championship season.

== Early life ==
Mruzik was raised in Livonia, Michigan, the daughter of Jeff and Jackie Mruzik. She began playing volleyball as a fourth grader. She wanted to play for the Michigan Wolverines from an early age and was a ball girl for the team in middle school. She attended Mercy High School in Farmington Hills, Michigan, being named all-state all four years. In her senior year in 2019, she led Mercy to go 59–1 and win the Michigan state title and was named the national Gatorade Player of the Year. She played club volleyball for Legacy Volleyball Club, winning the AAU under-18 national championship in 2018.

== College career ==
Mruzik's freshman season with the Michigan Wolverines was delayed due to the COVID-19 pandemic in 2020. In the spring season, she hit 3.54 kills per set on an .157 hitting percentage, being named to the Big Ten Conference all-freshman team as Michigan went 4–9. In her sophomore season, she hit 3.57 kills per set on .244 hitting with a career-high 2.52 digs per set, earning first-team All-Big Ten honors. She helped Michigan improve to 18–12 and qualify for the NCAA tournament. She averaged 3.68 kills on .240 hitting with 2.34 digs per set in her junior season, repeating as first-team All-Big Ten, as Michigan went 17–13 and missed the NCAA tournament.

After three seasons in Ann Arbor, Mruzik transferred to the seven-time national champion Penn State Nittany Lions in 2023. Her production of 4.40 kills per set was the second best mark in program history, and she hit .251 with 2.29 digs per set, earning first-team All-Big Ten and second-team AVCA All-American honors. Penn State went 23–9, reaching the third round of the NCAA tournament. In her fifth season of eligibility, granted to college athletes because of the COVID-19 pandemic, she made 4.25 kills per set with career highs of 0.256 hitting, 2.37 digs, and 0.40 assists per set, earning first-team All-Big 10 and first-team All-American honors. She captained Penn State to finish the season 35–2, taking a share of the Big Ten regular-season title and winning the 2024 national championship, the program's eighth national title and first since 2014. In the national semifinals, she made a game-high 26 kills as Penn State pulled off a reverse sweep against Nebraska. In the national title game, she tied her season high with 29 kills on .315 hitting, made 14 digs, and tied her career high with 5 blocks in a 3–1 win against Louisville. She was named the tournament's most outstanding player.

== Professional career ==
Mruzik joined LOVB Houston for LOVB Pro's inaugural 2025 season.

== International career ==
Mruzik led the United States to the 2019 FIVB Volleyball Girls' U18 World Championship, where she was named the most valuable player of the tournament.
