= The Citadel Bulldogs =

Sports teams of The Citadel, the Military College of South Carolina

- University: The Citadel
- Nickname: Bulldogs
- NCAA: Division I (FCS)
- Conference: SoCon (primary)
- Athletic director: Art Chase
- Location: Charleston, South Carolina
- Varsity teams: 14 (8 men's, 5 women's, 1 co-ed)
- Football stadium: Johnson Hagood Stadium
- Basketball arena: McAlister Field House
- Baseball stadium: Joseph P. Riley Jr. Park
- Soccer stadium: WLI Field
- Colors: Infantry blue and white
- Mascot: General and Boo IX (live), Spike
- Fight song: "The Fighting Light Brigade"
- Website: citadelsports.com

The Citadel Bulldogs are the athletic teams that represent The Citadel. All sports participate in the NCAA Division I except football, which competes in the NCAA Division I Football Championship Subdivision (FCS). Since 1936, varsity sports have competed in the Southern Conference. The Citadel fields teams in sixteen sports, nine for men and seven for women. Members of the corps of cadets and non-cadet day and night students are eligible to participate in Citadel athletics.

The Citadel is one of only two Division I schools that do not sponsor women's basketball; the other is fellow Southern Conference member and senior military college VMI.

== Conference affiliations ==
The Citadel competes in the Southern Conference for all sports.

=== Southern Intercollegiate Athletic Association ===
From 1909 to 1935, The Citadel played as a part of the Southern Intercollegiate Athletic Association, a conglomerate of many schools which gave birth to the Southern Conference during a clash over freshman eligibility. The Citadel remained in the SIAA after eight schools joined with six non-SIAA members to create the SoCon in 1921.

=== Southern Conference ===
Shortly after thirteen schools departed the Southern Conference to form the Southeastern Conference (SEC), The Citadel and six other schools joined the conference. Furman also joined in 1936, making them and The Citadel the schools with the longest current continuous tenure in the conference. (VMI joined even earlier in 1924 but was not a member from 2003 to 2014.)

== Sports sponsored ==
SoCon's logo in Citadel's colors

Men's sports	Women's sports
Baseball	Cross country
Basketball	Golf
Cross country	Soccer
Football	Track & field^{†}
Tennis	Volleyball
Track & field^{†}	
Wrestling	
Co-ed sports
Rifle
† – Track and field includes both indoor and outdoor.

A member of the Southern Conference, The Citadel sponsors teams in nine men's and seven women's NCAA sanctioned sports.

=== Baseball ===
The Citadel's most successful athletics program, the baseball team has won thirteen Southern Conference championships and eight Southern Conference baseball tournament championships. The 1990 team advanced to the College World Series, becoming the first military school to do so; they finished with a record of 46–14 and were ranked sixth in the final Collegiate Baseball poll that season. The Bulldogs are coached by Russell Triplett. As of the end of the 2025 season, 50 players have been selected in the Major League Baseball draft.

=== Basketball ===
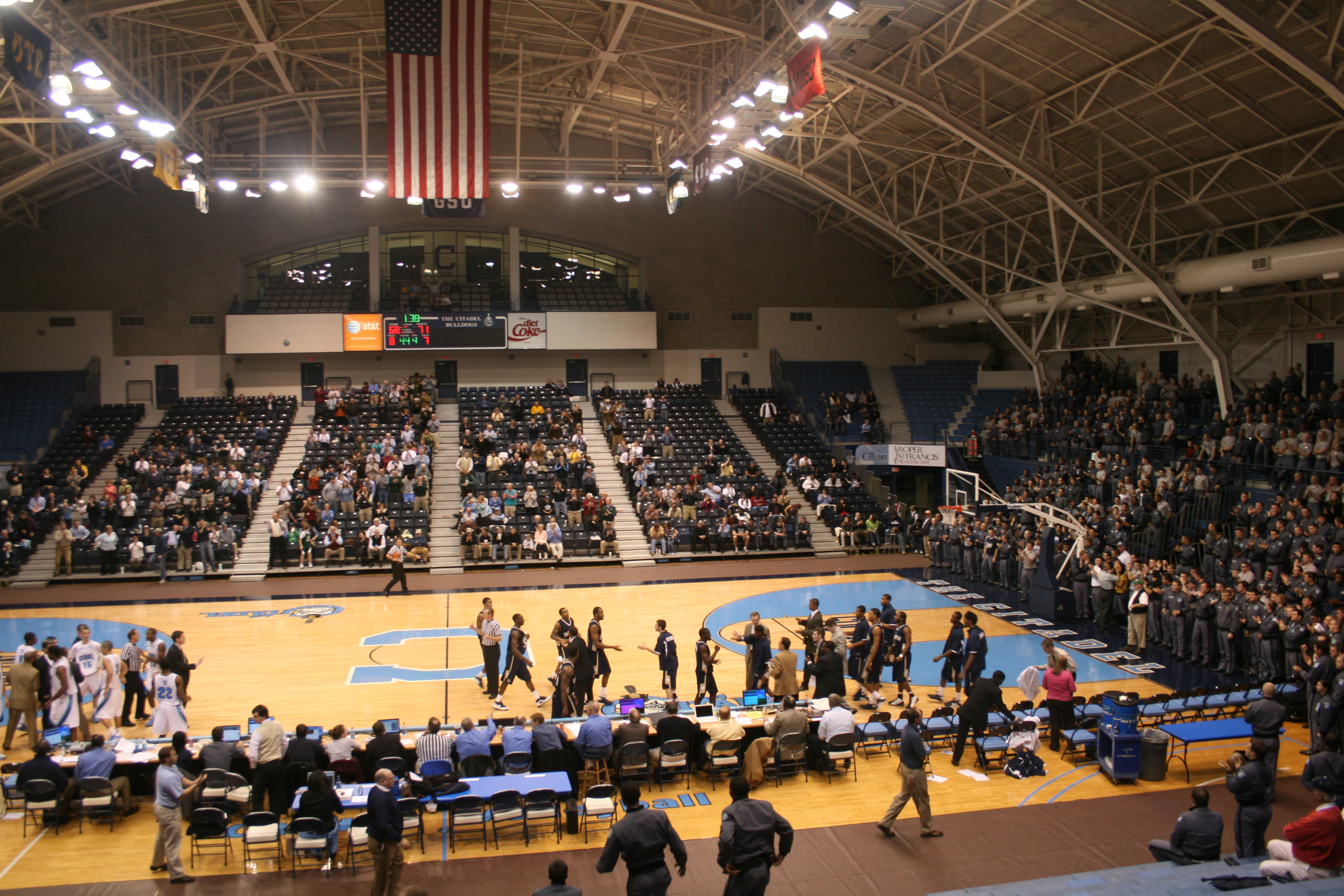
McAlister Field House

The Citadel Bulldogs basketball team dates to the 1900–01 season, posting an all-time record of 914–1176. The Citadel's 1966–67 season is chronicled in Pat Conroy's My Losing Season. The 2008–09 squad won 20 games for just the second time in school history and participated in the postseason for the first time, playing in the CollegeInsider.com Tournament; they were defeated in the first round by eventual champion Old Dominion. The team has never played in the NCAA Division I men's basketball tournament.

The current Head Coach is Ed Conroy '89, cousin of bestselling author Pat Conroy '67. Recent head coaches have included Duggar Baucom and Chuck Driesell, son of coaching legend Lefty Driesell.

=== Football ===
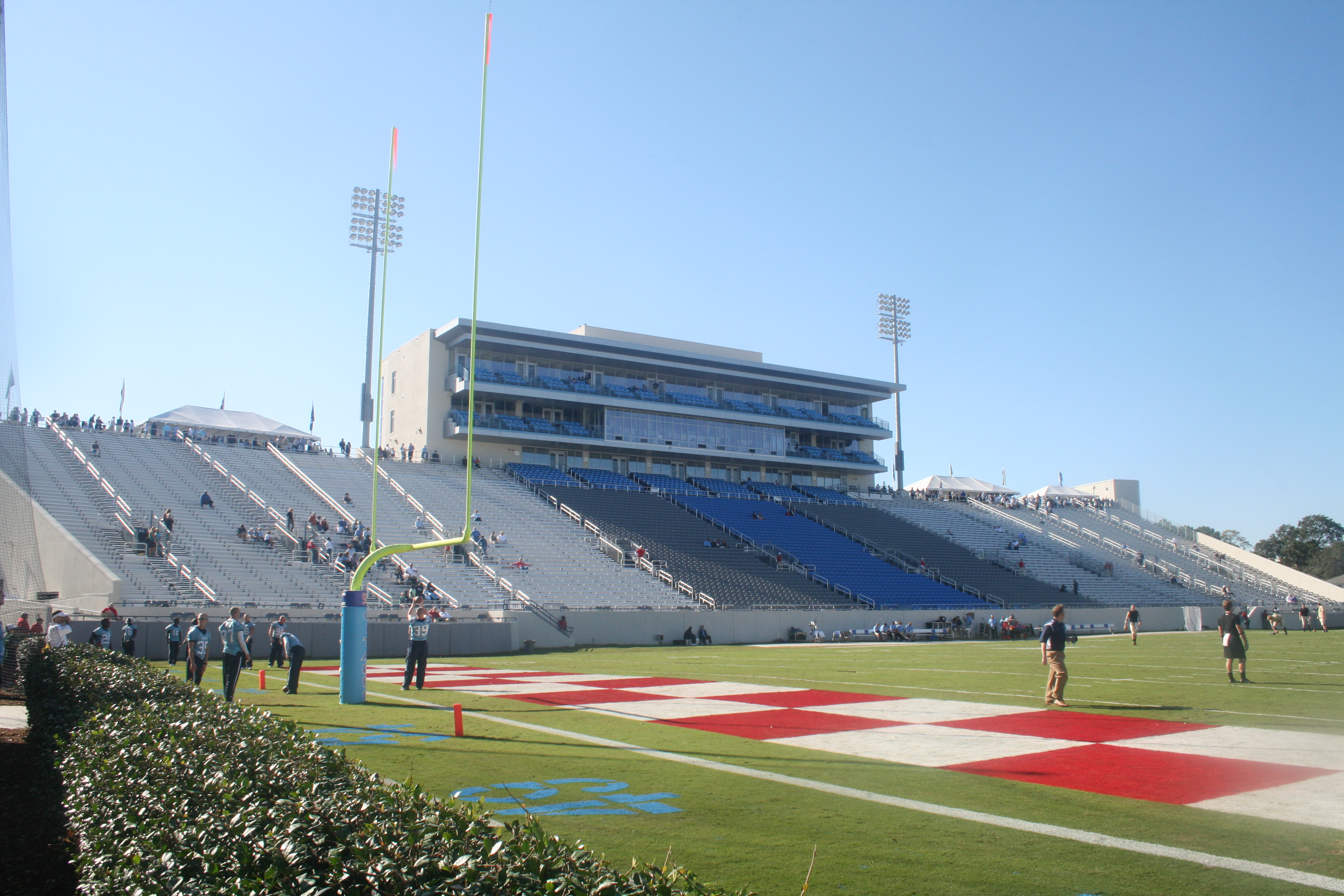
Johnson Hagood Stadium

The Citadel has won four Southern Conference Championships in 1961, 1992, 2015 and 2016. In 1960, the Bulldogs won the Tangerine Bowl, defeating Tennessee Tech 27–0. The Bulldogs have appeared in the FCS Playoffs five times, advancing to the second round in 1992 before losing to eventual runner-up Youngstown State. The 1992 squad finished with a record of 11–2 and was ranked #1 in the final regular season I-AA poll.

The current Head Coach is Maurice Drayton.

Since 2005, three Bulldog players have been drafted by NFL teams. Several alumni have played in the pro ranks including former ESPN analyst Paul Maguire, a tight end and punter with the LA/San Diego Chargers and Buffalo Bills; running back Stump Mitchell with the St. Louis/Arizona Cardinals, kicker Greg Davis who played for several teams including Atlanta, Tampa Bay and Arizona; running back Travis Jervey who played in 2 Super Bowls with Green Bay and fullback Nehemiah Broughton who played for Washington, the New York Giants and Arizona. Wide receiver Andre Roberts of the Bills and cornerback Cortez Allen of Pittsburgh are currently active.

=== Rifle ===
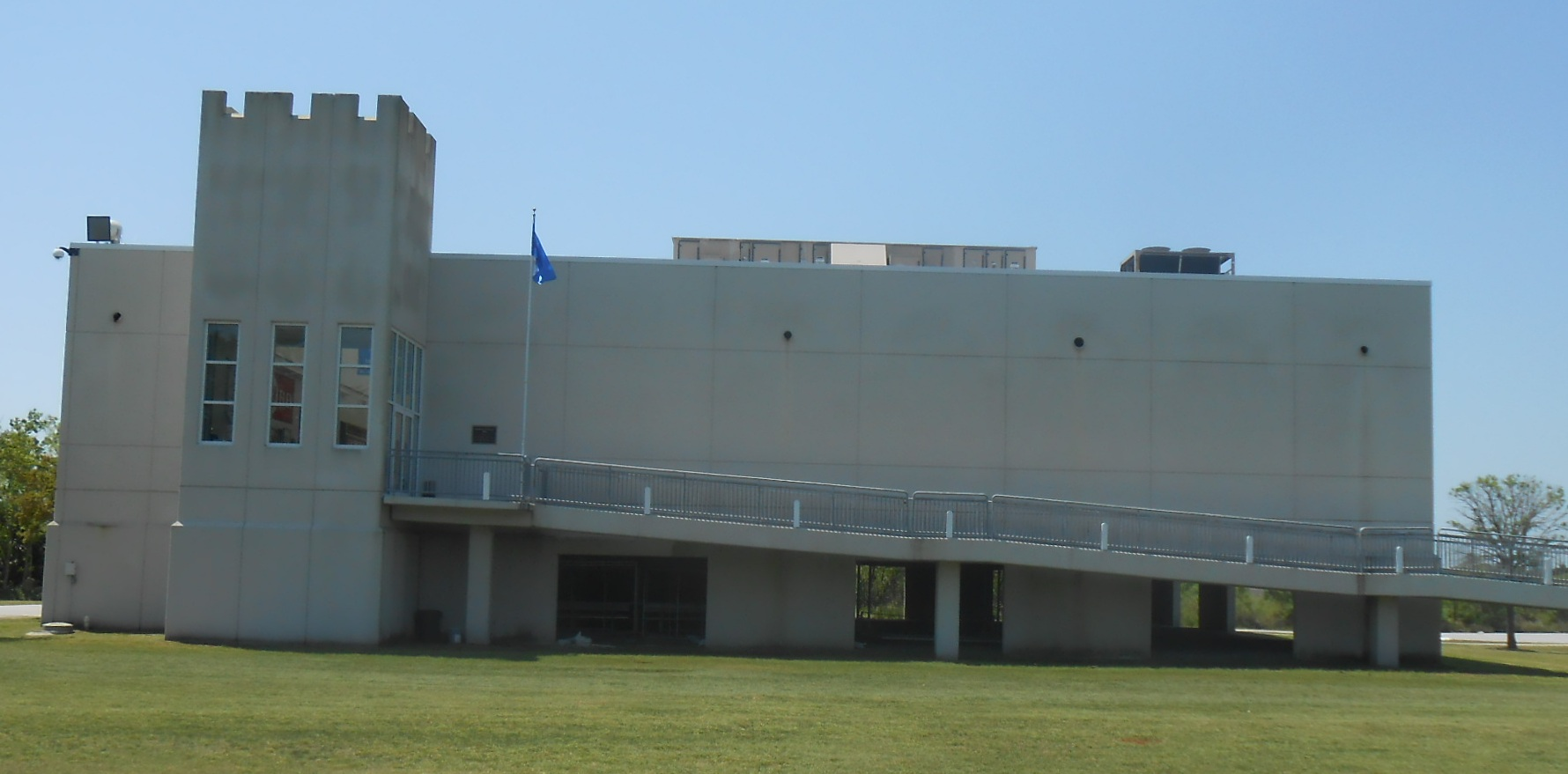
Inouye Marksmanship Center

The Rifle team is coached by William Smith, in his 17th season in 2017–18. Under Smith's leadership, the team returned to varsity status in 2001 after 9 years at the club level. The Bulldogs have claimed SEARC championships in 2001–02 and 2010–11 and National Championships in 1939, 1953, 1963, and 1965. The team also claimed eight Southern Conference titles between 1960 and 1974. The pre-NCAA sponsoring body, the National Rifle Association of America, credits The Citadel with one Intercollege Rifle Team Trophy, in 1963. The team competes at the Inouye Marksmanship Center, a highly advanced $3.2 million facility that is also utilized by The Citadel's club pistol team, ROTC, local law enforcement and the South Carolina National Guard

=== Women's soccer ===
The women's soccer team was established in 2001 and is currently coached by Ciaran Traquair. The team plays its home games at WLI Field.

=== Volleyball ===
The volleyball team was the first women's team sport sponsored by The Citadel, established in 1998, shortly after the integration of women into the Corps of Cadets in 1996. The team is currently led by Dave Zelenock and competes in McAlister Field House. The Bulldogs won the 2021 SoCon Tournament and appeared in the 2021 NCAA Division I women's volleyball tournament (their first title in a women's sport) and also won the 2023 SoCon regular season title after starting the season 23–0.

=== Wrestling ===
The Citadel Bulldogs wrestling team has claimed Southern Conference championships in 1967 and 2004, and have 4 All-Americans, with 2 from the 2013 squad. They are currently coached by Ryan LeBlanc. Vandiver Hall is the practice facility on campus for the wrestling team, while the McAlister Field House hosts home dual meets and tournaments, also located on campus.

=== Defunct teams ===
- Boxing (discontinued 1953)
- Men's Golf (discontinued 2004)
- Men's Soccer (discontinued 2004)
- Men's Swimming & Diving (discontinued 1983)

== Facilities ==
The Citadel football team plays in Johnson Hagood Stadium, a 11,500-seat stadium just to the south of campus. The stadium is undergoing a long-term renovation and rebuilding, which includes the Altman Athletic Center, completed in 2001, and the rebuilt west stands, 2006 and club tower, 2008. The team practices at the Mayberry Triplets Practice facility on the north edge of campus, and utilizes Seignious Hall, on campus behind McAlister Field House and Vandiver Hall, for locker rooms, team meeting space, and weightlifting.

The baseball team shares 6,000 seats Joseph P. Riley Jr. Park with the professional Charleston RiverDogs of the Class-A South Atlantic League for games, and practices at College Park, on Rutledge Avenue. The Citadel owns College Park and has considered a number of future uses for it, including a stadium for the women's soccer team and a tennis complex.

The basketball, wrestling, and volleyball teams use McAlister Field House, a 6,000-seat facility on campus for games and practices. The basketball team's locker room is also in McAlister.

The women's soccer team practices and plays on WLI Field, located on campus to the west of the mess hall and Indian Hill. WLI Field is the former home of the baseball team and men's soccer team.

The rifle team uses the Inouye Marksmanship Center, which is situated behind WLI field on the banks of the Ashley River.

The tennis team competes at the Earle Tennis Center, completed in 1990. Comprising ten courts, the facility is located between Stevens Barracks and the infirmary.

All teams, other than football, baseball and basketball, utilize Vandiver Hall, located behind McAlister Field House is home to track offices, golf offices, wrestling offices, various locker rooms, an indoor golf practice facility, indoor batting cages for baseball and the wrestling practice facility.

== Rivalries ==
The Citadel's most heated rivalries are with the VMI Keydets, Furman Paladins, Charleston Southern Buccaneers and College of Charleston Cougars. Furman has been the longest running rivalry, although the Paladins have led the series in football for many decades. While The Citadel has played VMI in many sports for decades, the rivalry has only developed since the creation of the Silver Shako trophy for football in 1976. The football game is now known as the Military Classic of the South. Crosstown rival College of Charleston has become a major rivalry in basketball and baseball, although the Cougars have controlled the games in basketball since joining the Southern Conference (the Cougars left for the Colonial Athletic Association in 2013).

Other historical rivalries include Clemson, South Carolina, Wofford, Presbyterian College, and Newberry College.

== Championships ==
The Bulldogs claim four national championships in rifle, including two individual national championships. In addition, varsity Bulldog teams have claimed 41 conference championships and record 224 individual conference championships.

Sport		Titles
Baseball		College World Series Appearance: 1990; SoCon Tournament Champions: 1990, 1994, 1995, 1998, 1999, 2001, 2004, 2010; SoCon Regular Season Champions: 1960, 1971, 1975, 1979, 1982, 1983, 1990, 1991, 1995, 1999, 2000, 2002, 2010
Basketball		SIAA Tournament Champions: 1927
Boxing		SoCon Champions: 1949; SoCon Individual Champions: 4
Football		Playoff appearances: 1988, 1990, 1992, 2015, 2016; SoCon Champions: 1960, 1992, 2015, 2016
Golf	Men's	SoCon Champions: 1964
Rifle		National champions: 1939, 1953, 1963, 1965; William Randolph Hearst Trophy: 1963, 1965; SEARC Champions: 1999, 2001, 2002, 2010; SoCon Champions: 1960, 1961, 1962, 1963, 1964, 1969, 1973, 1974
Tennis		SoCon Champions: 1964; SoCon Singles Champions: 19; SoCon Doubles Champions: 9
Track and Field	Men's	SoCon Champions: 1959, 1960, 1961; SoCon Indoor Event Champions: 36; SoCon Outdoor Event Champions: 88
Track and Field	Women's	SoCon Indoor Event Champions: 3 SoCon Outdoor Event Champions: 3
Volleyball		SoCon Tournament Champions: 2021
Wrestling		All-Americans: 4 SoCon Champions: 1967, 2004; SoCon Individual Champions: 69

== Club sports ==
- Ice Hockey
- Lacrosse
- Judo

- NCJA Nage No Kata Champions 2023

- Pistol
- Men's Rugby
- Women's Rugby
- Sailing
- Men's Soccer
