= Provident Credit Union Event Center =

Multipurpose indoor arena owned and operated by San Jose State University (SJSU)

- Official logo since 2019

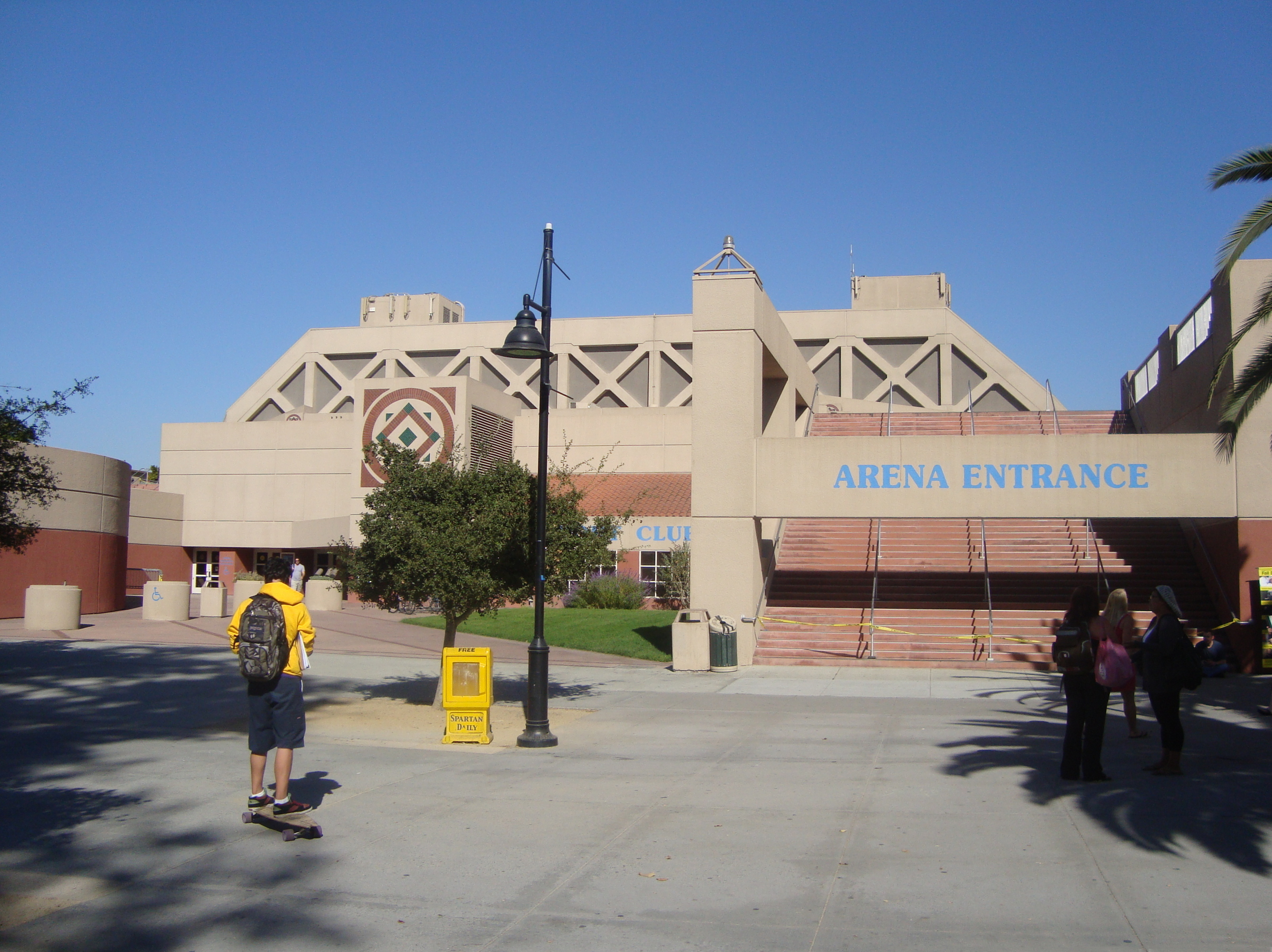
- The entrance to Event Center Arena, October 2010
- Interactive map of Provident Credit Union Event Center
- Former names: Event Center Arena (1989-2019)
- Location: 290 South 7th Street; San Jose, California 95192
- Coordinates: 37.33536°N 121.87985°W
- Owner: San Jose State University
- Operator: San Jose State University
- Capacity: 5,000 (basketball); 6,000 (concerts)
- Surface: Hardwood
- Public transit: : Paseo de San Antonio : 72, 73; Highway 17 Express

Construction
- Groundbreaking: October 1, 1986
- Opened: September 8, 1989
- Cost: $31 million (approx. $80.26 million by December 2025)

Tenants
- San Jose State Spartans (NCAA) (1989–present); San Jose Jammers (CBA) (1989–1991); San Jose Lasers (ABL) (1996–1998)

The Provident Credit Union Event Center, formerly and more commonly known as the Event Center, is a complex consisting of an indoor arena and a fitness club on the main campus of San José State University (SJSU) in downtown San Jose, California. The Event Center was built in 1989 for the purpose of supporting and providing entertainment as well as recreational opportunities for the student body and university community. The facility is home to the San Jose State Spartans men's and women's basketball teams, which both compete in the Mountain West Conference.

Located in the heart of Silicon Valley, the Event Center at SJSU is the premier mid-size venue in Northern California. The Event Center was designed to accommodate many different events, including musical concerts, sporting events, conferences and corporate parties.

The Event Center also housed a fully equipped student recreation center, which comprised basketball and racquetball courts and a weight room, before it was replaced in 2019 by a much larger, $130 million facility located next door to the arena.

== History ==
Prior to the Event Center's inception, SJSU's men's basketball team used to play at the San Jose Civic Auditorium and the Spartan Gym (nka Yosh Uchida Hall). Talks for a better basketball arena started when head coach Bill Berry arrived in 1979, and during a time when Spartan Gym became increasingly overcrowded with bookings to utilize its buildings for recreation.

Funding for the arena started in 1982 and an official announcement, from SJSU, to build the arena came in March 1984 as a recreation and events center that would serve the basketball and women's volleyball teams, host concerts, have a recreation facility, and have a 50-meter indoor swimming pool. The arena was initially proposed to have a seating capacity of 10,000 for concerts and 7,500 for basketball games. Construction began in October 1986.

The arena held its grand opening in September 8, 1989 seating "6,000 for concerts and 5,000 for athletic events" that also contained an aerobics room, 10 racquetball courts, "a 4,000-square-foot weight room, health bar, and a larger-than-Olympic-sized pool that can hold almost one million gallons of water". The total construction cost to build the arena was $31 million (approximately $80.26 million by December 2025)

In August 2019, the university reached an $8.1 million, 20-year deal with Provident Credit Union to rename the Event Center Arena to Provident Credit Union Event Center.

== Athletic events ==
=== Basketball ===
The very first basketball game held in the arena was an exhibition game between upstart semi-professional basketball team San Jose Jammers and Stroitel (now BC Budivelnyk) of the USSR Premier Basketball League on November 9, 1989 whereas the very first regular season college basketball game took place 14 days later when San Jose State played against South Alabama.

The Golden State Warriors used to host exhibition games against other NBA opponents in 1990 and 1992. During the 2011 NBA lockout, the Warriors hosted a charity game where its current (2011–12) team played against the 2006–07 team.

The arena was also home to the Central Coast Section boys and girls basketball playoffs.

=== Gymnastics ===
In August 1990, the arena hosted a nationally-televised rematch between the United States and Soviet Union national men's and women's gymnastics teams.

== Non-athletic events ==
Since its opening, the facility has played host to numerous national entertainment acts such as Rage Against the Machine, Eric Clapton, Jerry Garcia Band, Prince, George Lopez, Drake, Wiz Khalifa, Kelly Clarkson, Conan O'Brien, Korn, and Pearl Jam.

Annually, the Event Center hosts the FIRST Robotics Competition Silicon Valley Regional. The San José State University Career Center also uses the arena to host its fall and spring career fairs, which generally feature hundreds of potential employers for students of the university.

In October 2010, the California Democratic Party hosted a rally that included Bill Clinton, Jerry Brown, and Gavin Newsom as the speakers.

It also hosts the fall and spring convocation ceremonies for both the College of Engineering and the College of Business at San José State University.

== See also ==
- List of NCAA Division I basketball arenas
