= The Citadel Bulldogs men's tennis =

Men's tennis team

The Citadel Bulldogs
- University: The Citadel
- Athletic director: Art Chase
- Head coach: Chuck Kriese (14th season)
- Conference: SoCon
- Location: Charleston, South Carolina, US
- Home Court: Earle Tennis Center
- Nickname: Bulldogs
- Colors: Infantry blue and white

Conference Tournament championships
- 1961

The Citadel Bulldogs men's tennis team represents The Citadel in the sport of tennis. The Bulldogs compete in NCAA Division I's Southern Conference (SoCon). The team hosts its home matches at the Earle Tennis Center on the university's Charleston, South Carolina campus, and is led by Hall of Fame coach Chuck Kriese. The Bulldogs won their only SoCon Championship in 1961. Individual Bulldogs have won 19 singles and 9 doubles at the SoCon championships.
