= 2021 The Citadel Bulldogs women's volleyball team =

American college volleyball season

2021 The Citadel Bulldogs women's volleyball

SoCon Tournament champion

NCAA Tournament
- Conference: Southern Conference
- Record: 14–12 (7–9 SoCon)
- Head coach: Dave Zelenock (4th season)
- Home arena: McAlister Field House

2021 Southern Conference volleyball standings
	Conf.				Overall
Team	W		L	PCT	W		L	PCT
UNC Greensboro ‍†‍‍	12	–	4	.750	23	–	7	.767
Mercer ‍†‍‍	12	–	4	.750	16	–	12	.571
Wofford ‍‍‍	9	–	7	.563	17	–	14	.548
Samford ‍‍‍	9	–	7	.563	11	–	18	.379
The Citadel ‍‍‡‍^{y}	7	–	9	.438	14	–	12	.538
East Tennessee State ‍‍‍	7	–	9	.438	11	–	17	.393
Western Carolina ‍‍‍	7	–	9	.438	11	–	17	.393
Chattanooga ‍‍‍	7	–	9	.438	11	–	19	.367
Furman ‍‍‍	2	–	14	.125	9	–	20	.310
† – Conference champion ‡ – Tournament champion y – Invited to the NCAA Tournament; As of December 4, 2021; Rankings from AVCA

The Citadel Bulldogs women's volleyball team represented The Citadel in the 2021 NCAA Division I women's volleyball season. The Bulldogs played as members of the Southern Conference and were led by fourth year head coach Dave Zelenock. They played their home games at McAlister Field House.

The Bulldogs finished in fifth place in the SoCon, and then swept the conference tournament to claim the SoCon championship for the first time in program history. This also marked the first women's team conference championship for The Citadel, and their first winning season in program history. The Bulldogs advanced to their first NCAA Tournament, where they were defeated in straight sets by eighth-seeded Georgia Tech.

== Previous season ==
The Bulldogs finished 9–12 overall and 7–9 in the SoCon in the 2020–21 season, which was altered due to the COVID-19 pandemic. This marked the highest winning percentage in program history, and the best conference record.

== Roster ==
2021 The Citadel Bulldogs roster
Defensive Specialist/Libero: 8 - Jaelynn Elgert - Sophomore; 17 - Faith Justice - Senior; 21 - Kenzie Kellerman - Junior; 22 - Brooke Shively - Sophomore; Opposite hitters: 4 - Makaya Middleton - Junior	Outside hitters: 11 - Sharlissa de Jesus - Graduate Student; 12 - Kathleen Bula - Sophomore; 18 - Ali Ruffin - Freshman; 20 - Laura Kuhlmann - (redshirt) Sophomore	Setters: 1 - Belle Hogan - Freshman; 5 - Amie Greene - Junior; Middle blockers: 3 - Alicia Roberts - Senior; 6 - Maya Elassal - Senior; 10 - Gina Delancey - Junior; 15 - Sadie Gomez - Freshman; 25 - Maddy Cardenas - Junior

== Schedule ==
Legend
The Citadel win
The Citadel loss
Tie

Date Time	Opponent	Arena City (Tournament)	Result	Attendance	Record (SoCon Record)
Aug 27; 10:30 AM	vs Tennessee Tech	Auburn Arena • Auburn, AL (War Eagle Invitational)	Cancelled		
Aug 27; 7:00 PM	at Auburn	Auburn Arena • Auburn, AL (War Eagle Invitational)	Cancelled		
Aug 28; 1:00 PM	vs Jackson State	Auburn Arena • Auburn, AL (War Eagle Invitational)	Cancelled		
Sept 3; 5:00 PM	vs Jacksonville State	Buccaneer Field House • North Charleston, SC (VolleyBuc Invitational)	Cancelled		
Sept 4; 11:00 AM	vs Wyoming	Buccaneer Field House • North Charleston, SC (VolleyBuc Invitational)	Cancelled		
Sept 7; 6:00 PM	Idaho State	McAlister Field House • Charleston, SC	W 3–2	101	1–0
Sept 10; 6:00 PM	vs Northern Illinois	Buccaneer Field House • North Charleston, SC (Buccaneer Invitational)	L 1–3	44	1–1
Sept 11; 12:00 PM	vs Bethune–Cookman	Buccaneer Field House • North Charleston, SC (Buccaneer Invitational)	W 3–0	44	2–1
Sept 11; 6:00 PM	at Charleston Southern	Buccaneer Field House • North Charleston, SC (Buccaneer Invitational)	W 3–1	44	3–1
Sept 16; 6:00 PM	South Carolina State	McAlister Field House • Charleston, SC; The Citadel Tournament	W 3–0	217	4–1
Sept 17; 6:00 PM	Presbyterian	McAlister Field House • Charleston, SC; The Citadel Tournament	L 1–3	125	4–2
Sept 24; 7:00 PM	at Mercer	Hawkins Arena • Macon, GA	L 0–3	20	4–3 (0–1)
Sept 25; 8:00 PM	at Samford	Pete Hanna Center • Homewood, AL	L 1–3	382	4–4 (0–2)
Sept 29; 6:00 PM	Wofford	McAlister Field House • Charleston, SC	W 3–1	101	5–4 (1–2)
Oct 2; 7:00 PM	Chattanooga	McAlister Field House • Charleston, SC	W3–0	317	6–4 (2–2)
Oct 3; 1:00 PM	East Tennessee State	McAlister Field House • Charleston, SC	L 1–3	147	6–5 (2–3)
Oct 6; 6:00 PM	Furman	McAlister Field House • Charleston, SC	W 3–0	101	7–5 (3–3)
Oct 15; 7:00 PM	at UNC Greensboro	Fleming Gymnasium • Greensboro, NC	W 3–2	514	8–5 (4–3)
Oct 16; 6:00 PM	at Western Carolina	Ramsey Center • Cullowhee, NC	L 0–3	115	8–6 (4–4)
Oct 22; 6:00 PM	Samford	McAlister Field House • Charleston, SC	W 3–1	69	9–6 (5–4)
Oct 23; 7:00 PM	Mercer	McAlister Field House • Charleston, SC	L 0–3	101	9–7 (5–5)
Oct 27; 6:00 PM	at Wofford	Jerry Richardson Indoor Stadium • Spartanburg, SC	L 1–3	102	9–8 (5–6)
Oct 29; 6:00 PM	at Chattanooga	Maclellan Gymnasium • Chattanooga, TN	L 1–3	397	9–9 (5–7)
Oct 30; 3:00 PM	at East Tennessee State	Brooks Gymnasium • Johnston City, TN	L 2–3	59	9–10 (5–8)
Nov 3; 7:00 PM	at Furman	Alley Gymnasium • Greenville, SC	W 3–0	218	10–10 (6–8)
Nov 12; 6:00 PM	Western Carolina	McAlister Field House • Charleston, SC	W 3–1	209	11–10 (7–8)
Nov 13; 7:00 PM	UNC Greensboro	McAlister Field House • Charleston, SC	L 1–3	137	11–11 (7–9)
Nov 19; 6:00 PM	UNC Greensboro	Pete Hanna Center • Homewood, AL; 2021 Southern Conference women's volleyball tournament	W 3–2		12–11 (1–0)
Nov 20; 8:30 PM	Samford	Pete Hanna Center • Homewood, AL; 2021 Southern Conference women's volleyball tournament	W 3–1	354	13–11 (2–0)
Nov 21; 5:00 PM	Wofford	Pete Hanna Center • Homewood, AL; 2021 Southern Conference women's volleyball tournament	W 3–0	123	14–11 (3–0)
Dec 3; 7:00 PM	at Georgia Tech	O'Keefe Gymnasium • Atlanta, GA; NCAA Louisville Regional	L 0–3	1,200	14–12
