= The Citadel Bulldogs wrestling =

The Citadel Bulldogs
- University: The Citadel
- Athletic director: Art Chase
- Head coach: Tim McCall (1st season)
- Conference: Southern Conference
- Location: Charleston, SC
- Arena: McAlister Field House (capacity: 6,000)
- Nickname: Bulldogs, Cadets
- Colors: Infantry blue and white

All-Americans
- 4

Conference championships
- Team: 3 (1967, 2004, 2026); Individual: 72

Conference Tournament championships
- 2004

The Citadel Bulldogs wrestling team represents The Citadel of Charleston, South Carolina. The squad is led by head coach Tim McCall. The Bulldogs are members of the Southern Conference and have won conference championships in 1967, 2004, and 2026. They also claimed the 2004 SoCon Tournament championship.

== History ==
The highest placement in school history for The Citadel was in 2013, when the team finished 20th at the NCAA Division I Wrestling Championships. Vandiver Hall is the practice facility on campus for the wrestling team, while McAlister Field House hosts home dual meets and tournaments, also located on campus. The Citadel has also hosted outdoor matches three times, using the quadrangle within one of the open-air barracks. The most recent such event was a loss to Arizona State on November 11, 2012.

Turtog Luvsandorj (2009–2014), a former NCAA All-American for The Citadel in 2014, is the school's career wins leader with 134 wins.

Four Bulldog wrestlers have placed in the top 8 of their weight class to earn All-America honors at the NCAA Division I Wrestling Championships. Dan Thompson was the first to earn the honor, earning a 7th-place finish at 165 lbs in 2006. In 2013, Ugi Khishignyam finished 4th at 141 lbs, while teammate Odie Delaney finished 7th at 285 lbs. In 2014, five Bulldogs qualified for the NCAA Championships, with Turtog Luvsandorj earning All-American status with a 6th-place finish at 165 lbs.

== Coaching staff ==
Tim McCall is the head coach, having been named to that position in May 2026.
