= The Citadel Bulldogs rifle =

- University: The Citadel
- Athletic Director: Art Chase
- Head coach: Claire O'Neel
- Conference: Southern Conference
- Location: Charleston, South Carolina
- Home range: Inouye Marksmanship Center
- Nickname: Bulldogs
- Colors: Infantry blue and white

National champions
- Hearst Trophy: 1963, 1965

Conference champions
- SoCon: 1960, 1961, 1962, 1963, 1964, 1969, 1973, 1974, 2023; SEARC: 1999, 2001, 2002, 2010

The Citadel Bulldogs rifle team represents The Citadel in rifle. They compete in the National Collegiate Athletic Association and in the Southern Conference. The Bulldogs have claimed two national and thirteen conference championships. The team has produced 15 All-Americans.

The team competes at the Inouye Marksmanship Center, a facility that is also utilized by The Citadel's club pistol team, ROTC, local law enforcement, and the South Carolina National Guard.

== See also ==
- List of NCAA rifle programs
