= The Citadel Bulldogs women's volleyball =

American college volleyball team

The Citadel Bulldogs volleyball
- University: The Citadel
- Athletic director: Art Chase
- Head coach: Dave Zelenock (9th season)
- Conference: SoCon
- Location: Charleston, South Carolina, US
- Home arena: McAlister Field House (capacity: 6,000)
- Colors: Infantry blue and white

AIAW/NCAA tournament appearance
- 2021

Conference tournament champion
- 2021

Conference regular season champion
- 2023

The Citadel Bulldogs volleyball team represents The Citadel in the sport of indoor volleyball. The Bulldogs compete in Division I of the National Collegiate Athletic Association (NCAA) and the Southern Conference (SoCon), and play their home matches in McAlister Field House on the school's Charleston, South Carolina campus. They are currently led by head coach Dave Zelenock, who led his first season in 2018.

The team was established in 1998 shortly after the integration of women into the South Carolina Corps of Cadets. Volleyball was the first women's team sport established at The Citadel.

On November 21, 2021, the Bulldogs completed a run through the Southern Conference Volleyball Tournament to claim their first championship, and also their first conference title in any women's team sport. The Citadel qualified for the 2021 NCAA Division I women's volleyball tournament.

In 2023, team program won 23 consecutive matches to begin the season, one of only two unbeaten teams in the nation to that point. They finished 27–4 overall, 14–2 in the Southern Conference, and earned the regular season conference title for the first time in program history. Though they were defeated in the semifinals of the SoCon Tournament, the Bulldogs were invited to the 2023 National Invitational Volleyball Championship, where they lost to East Carolina in the first round.

== All-time results ==
		Overall			SoCon
Season	Head coach	W	L	Pct	W	L	Pct
1998	Bonnie Jo Houchen	0	24	.000	0	0	.000
1999	Wendy Anderson	1	29	.033	0	20	.000
2000	Wendy Anderson	3	28	.097	0	18	.000
2001	Wendy Anderson	7	24	.226	0	20	.000
2002	Wendy Anderson	7	24	.226	0	20	.000
2003	Wendy Anderson	6	24	.200	1	17	.056
2004	Wendy Anderson	12	20	.375	3	13	.188
2005	Wendy Anderson	4	28	.125	0	18	.000
2006	Carolyn Geiger	10	24	.294	2	16	.111
2007	Carolyn Geiger	6	28	.176	1	17	.056
2008	Carolyn Geiger	9	23	.281	2	16	.111
2009	Carolyn Geiger	8	25	.242	2	14	.125
2010	Carolyn Geiger	7	25	.219	1	15	.063
2011	Amir Khaledi	8	22	.267	1	15	.063
2012	Amir Khaledi	6	28	.176	0	16	.000
2013	Amir Khaledi	5	28	.152	0	16	.000
2014	Amir Khaledi	8	26	.235	0	16	.000
2015	Craig Mosqueda	7	28	.200	0	16	.000
2016	Craig Mosqueda	8	25	.242	1	15	.063
2017	Craig Mosqueda	8	26	.235	2	14	.125
2018	Dave Zelenock	12	19	.387	4	12	.250
2019	Dave Zelenock	11	20	.355	4	12	.250
2020–21	Dave Zelenock	9	12	.429	7	9	.438
2021	Dave Zelenock	14	12	.538	7	9	.438
2022	Dave Zelenock	11	19	.367	4	12	.250
2023	Dave Zelenock	27	4	.900	14	2	.875
2024	Dave Zelenock	15	14	.517	8	8	.500
2025	Dave Zelenock	0	27	.000	0	16	.000
2026	Dave Zelenock	4	27	.129	1	17	.056
Total		233	664	.260	65	409	.137

== Head coaches ==
The table below shows the Bulldogs head coaches and their records through the 2025 season.

Name	Seasons	W	L	Pct
Bonnie Jo Houchen	1	0	24	.000
Wendy Anderson	7	39	177	.181
Carolyn Geiger	5	41	126	.246
Amir Khaledi	4	27	104	.206
Craig Mosqueda	3	23	79	.225
Dave Zelenock	9	103	154	.401
Total	29	233	664	.260

== See also ==
- List of NCAA Division I women's volleyball programs
