= Oregon Ducks women's volleyball =

American college volleyball team

- University: University of Oregon
- Head coach: Trent Kersten (1st season)
- Conference: Big Ten
- Location: Eugene, Oregon
- Home arena: Matthew Knight Arena (capacity: 12,364)
- Nickname: Ducks
- Colors: Green and yellow

AIAW/NCAA Tournament runner-up
- 2012

AIAW/NCAA Tournament semifinal
- 2012

AIAW/NCAA Regional Final
- 2012, 2018, 2022, 2023

AIAW/NCAA regional semifinal
- 1984, 2007, 2008, 2012, 2014, 2018, 2020, 2022, 2023, 2024

AIAW/NCAA Tournament appearance
- 1973, 1974, 1975, 1976, 1977, 1978, 1979, 1980, 1984, 1986, 1987, 1989, 2006, 2007, 2008, 2009, 2011, 2012, 2013, 2014, 2015, 2016, 2017, 2018, 2020, 2021, 2022, 2023, 2024

The Oregon Ducks women's volleyball team of the Big Ten Conference, is the intercollegiate women's volleyball team of the University of Oregon. The team plays its home games at Matthew Knight Arena, with its former arena being McArthur Court.

== Program record and history ==
Season	Head coach	Overall Record	Conference Record	Conference Standing	Post Season
2002	Carl Ferreira	11–21	1–17	10th	DNQ
2003	Carl Ferreira	3–24	0–18	10th	DNQ
2004	Carl Ferreira	10–19	1–17	10th	DNQ
2005	Jim Moore	12–18	1–17	10th	DNQ
2006	Jim Moore	17–12	7–11	6th	NCAA First Round
2007	Jim Moore	22–11	9–9	5th	NCAA Regional Semi-Final
2008	Jim Moore	25–9	11–7	4th	NCAA Regional Semi-Final
2009	Jim Moore	21–12	9–9	6th	NCAA Second Round
2010	Jim Moore	19–11	7–11	7th	DNQ
2011	Jim Moore	21–10	14–8	6th	NCAA First Round
2012	Jim Moore	30–5	16–4	2nd	NCAA Runner-Up
2013	Jim Moore	20–12	12–7	4th	NCAA Second Round
2014	Jim Moore	23–10	11–9	4th	NCAA Regional Semi-Final
2015	Jim Moore	16–14	10–10	6th	NCAA First Round
2016	Jim Moore	21–10	13–7	4th	NCAA Second Round
2017	Matt Ulmer	18–12	10–10	8th	NCAA Second Round
2018	Matt Ulmer	23–11	13–7	2nd	NCAA Regional Final
2019	Matt Ulmer	9–20	5–15	9th	DNQ
2020	Matt Ulmer	15–5	14–4	2nd	NCAA Regional Semi-Final
2021	Matt Ulmer	22–9	13–7	4th	NCAA First Round
2022	Matt Ulmer	26–6	17–3	2nd	NCAA Regional Final
2023	Matt Ulmer	29–6	16–4	2nd	NCAA Regional Final
2024	Matt Ulmer	24-8	14–6	5th	NCAA Regional Semi-Final

== Postseason ==
Below is a listing of Oregon Volleyball post-season history and results.

=== NCAA tournament results ===
Year	Seed	Round	Opponent	Result
1984	N/A	First round Sweet 16	Hawaii; San Jose St	W 3–2; L 3–1
1986	N/A	First round	Stanford	L 3–1
1987	N/A	First round	Stanford	L 3–0
1989	N/A	First round	Arizona	L 3–0
2006	N/A	First round	Hawaii	L 3–0
2007	N/A	First round Second round Sweet Sixteen	Missouri State (9) Kansas State (8) UCLA	W 3–0; W 3–2; L 3–1
2008	(11)	First round Second round Sweet Sixteen	Delaware; North Carolina; Iowa State	W 3–0; W 3–1; L 3–2
2009	(14)	First round Second round	Clemson; Kentucky	W 3–0; L 3–0
2011	N/A	First round	Colorado State	L 3–2
2012	(5)	First round Second round Sweet Sixteen; Elite Eight; Final Four; National Championship	Northern Colorado; Dayton (12) BYU (4) Nebraska (1) Penn State (3) Texas	W 3–0; W 3–0; W 3–1; W 3–1; W 3–1; L 3–0
2013	N/A	First round Second round	Miami FL (8) Nebraska	W 3–0; L 3–0
2014	(10)	First round Second round Sweet Sixteen	Santa Clara; LSU (7) North Carolina	W 3–0; W 3–1; L 3–1
2015	N/A	First round	(6) Wisconsin	L 3–1
2016	N/A	First round Second round	Miami OH (12) Michigan	W 3–1; L 3–1
2017	N/A	First round Second round	Kennesaw State (13) BYU	W 3–0; L 3–0
2018	(15)	First round Second round Sweet 16; Elite 8	New Mexico State; Baylor (2) Minnesota (7) Nebraska	W 3–1; W 3–2; W 3–1; L 3–0
2020	(10)	Second round Sweet 16	Notre Dame (7) Purdue	W 3–0; L 3–1
2021	N/A	First round	Kansas	L 3–0
2022	(3)	First round Second round Sweet 16; Elite 8	Loyola Marymount (6) Arkansas (2) Nebraska (1) Louisville	W 3–0; W 3–1; W 3–2; L 3–2
2023	(3)	First round Second round Sweet 16; Elite 8	Southeastern Louisiana; Hawai'i (2) Purdue (1) Wisconsin	W 3–0; W 3–0; W 3-0; L 3-1
2024	(4)	First round Second round Sweet 16	High Point (5) TCU (1) Pittsburgh	W 3–0; W 3–1; L 3-2

== See also ==
- List of NCAA Division I women's volleyball programs
