= Trent Kersten =

American volleyball coach (born 1993)

Current position
- Title: Head coach
- Team: Oregon
- Conference: Big Ten
- Record: 40–18 (.690)

Biographical details
- Born: April 21, 1993 (age 33); Anaheim, California, U.S.
- Education: UCLA

Playing career
- 2012–2015: UCLA

Coaching career (HC unless noted)
- 2015–2016: TCU (volunteer assistant)
- 2017–2019: TCU (assistant)
- 2020–2022: San Jose State
- 2023–2024: Loyola Marymount
- 2025–present: Oregon

Head coaching record
- Overall: 130–59 (.688)

Accomplishments and honors

Championships
- West Coast Conference (WCC) Champions (2024)

Awards
- WCC Coach of the Year (2024)

Trent Michael Kersten (born April 21, 1993) is an American former volleyball player who is the head coach of the Oregon Ducks women's volleyball team. He previously served as head coach at San Jose State and Loyola Marymount. He also was an assistant coach at TCU for five seasons.

== Personal life ==
Kersten was born in Anaheim, California. He played volleyball at Fountain Valley High School, where he was a two-time All-Sunset League selection and a two-year captain. He committed to play collegiate volleyball at UCLA.

== Career ==
=== Playing career ===
Kersten played three seasons at UCLA under Al Scates and John Speraw. Kersten started his career at UCLA as a walk-on (non-scholarship player) but ended up being a three-year starter at the middle blocker position and he earned a scholarship during his playing career. In his senior year in 2015, he was an All-MPSF honorable mention selection and ranked among the nation’s top 15 in hitting percentage and blocks per set. He credited his redshirt season at UCLA for helping him complete his biggest achievement – learning the middle blocker’s position.

=== Coaching career ===
Kersten began getting exposure to coaching while he was still a student at UCLA. He was a coach at the UCLA summer volleyball camps for most of his career. He also gained experience in recruiting, as he worked with UCLA’s recruiting department in his time there.

Kersten started his official coaching career after graduating from UCLA in 2015, as he was named as the recruiting coordinator and volunteer assistant coach for the 2015 season. He was eventually promoted to assistant coach in 2017. Kersten’s 2019 recruiting class was ranked fifth in the nation by high school recruiting agencies.

In 2020, Kersten was the head coach of San Jose State Spartans women's volleyball team, where he spent three seasons. In his time with the Spartans, he led the team to back-to-back years where the team set program and conference win records. His time at SJSU saw the team secure their highest win total in 15 years, along with the program's most conference wins in history.

Kersten was named head coach of Loyola Marymount in 2023. In 2024, he led the program to the West Coast Conference (WCC) conference title, its first since 1996. He was named the 2024 WCC Coach of the Year for his efforts.

Kersten was named the head coach of the Oregon Ducks women's volleyball team in February 2025.

== Head coaching record ==
Record table
Season	Team	Overall	Conference	Standing	Postseason
San Jose State Spartans (Mountain West Conference) (2020–2022)
2020	San Jose State	7–9	7–9	7th	
2021	San Jose State	19–10	13–5	3rd	
2022	San Jose State	19–11	14–4	2nd	
San Jose State:		45–30 (.600)	34–18 (.654)		
Loyola Marymount Lions (West Coast Conference) (2023–2024)
2023	Loyola Marymount	20–6	13–3	2nd	
2024	Loyola Marymount	25–6	16–2	1st	NCAA Second Round
Loyola Marymount:		45–12 (.789)	29–5 (.853)		
Oregon Ducks (Big Ten Conference) (2025–present)
2025	Oregon	17–13	8–12	T–10th	
2026	Oregon	23–5	14–3	T–2nd	
Oregon:		40–18 (.690)	22–15 (.595)		
Total:		130–60 (.684)			
National champion Postseason invitational champion Conference regular season champion Conference regular season and conference tournament champion Division regular season champion Division regular season and conference tournament champion Conference tournament champion
