= Dave Zelenock =

Current position
- Title: Head coach
- Team: The Citadel
- Record: 103–154

Coaching career (HC unless noted)
- 2004–2005: Northwood (Asst)
- 2006: Delaware State (Asst)
- 2007–2012: Central Michigan (Asst)
- 2013–2017: Tennessee Tech
- 2018–present: The Citadel

Dave Zelenock is an American college volleyball coach, currently serving as head coach of The Citadel Bulldogs women's volleyball team. He previously served as head coach at Tennessee Tech.

Zelenock was a club volleyball player at Central Michigan University. After graduation, he served as an assistant for one year at Northwood before moving to Delaware State for two years. Next, he returned to his alma mater, where he worked for six years and gained responsibilities for scouting and recruiting. He earned his first head coaching position at Tennessee Tech, where he served for five years before moving to The Citadel.

In his fourth season with the Bulldogs, Zelenock led the team to its first-ever Southern Conference title in a women's team sport and their first NCAA berth.

== Head coaching record ==
Record table
Season	Team	Overall	Conference	Standing	Postseason
Tennessee Tech (OVC) (2013–2017)
2013	Tennessee Tech	5–21	1–15	6th (East)	
2014	Tennessee Tech	15–19	9–7	T-4th	
2015	Tennessee Tech	10–21	7–9	T-6th	
2016	Tennessee Tech	7–22	3–13	11th	
2017	Tennessee Tech	4–24	2–14	12th	
Tennessee Tech:		41–107	22–58		
The Citadel (SoCon) (2018–present)
2018	The Citadel	12–19	4–12	9th	
2019	The Citadel	11–20	4–12	8th	
2020–21	The Citadel	9–12	7–9	T-5th	
2021	The Citadel	14–12	7–9	T-5th	NCAA First Round
2022	The Citadel	11–19	4–12	T-7th	
2023	The Citadel	27–4	14–2	1st	
2024	The Citadel	15–14	8–8		
2025	The Citadel	0–27	0–16		
2026	The Citadel	4–27	1–17		
The Citadel:		103–154	49–97		
Total:		144–261			
National champion Postseason invitational champion Conference regular season champion Conference regular season and conference tournament champion Division regular season champion Division regular season and conference tournament champion Conference tournament champion
