= Inouye Marksmanship Center =

Shooting range in Charleston, South Carolina

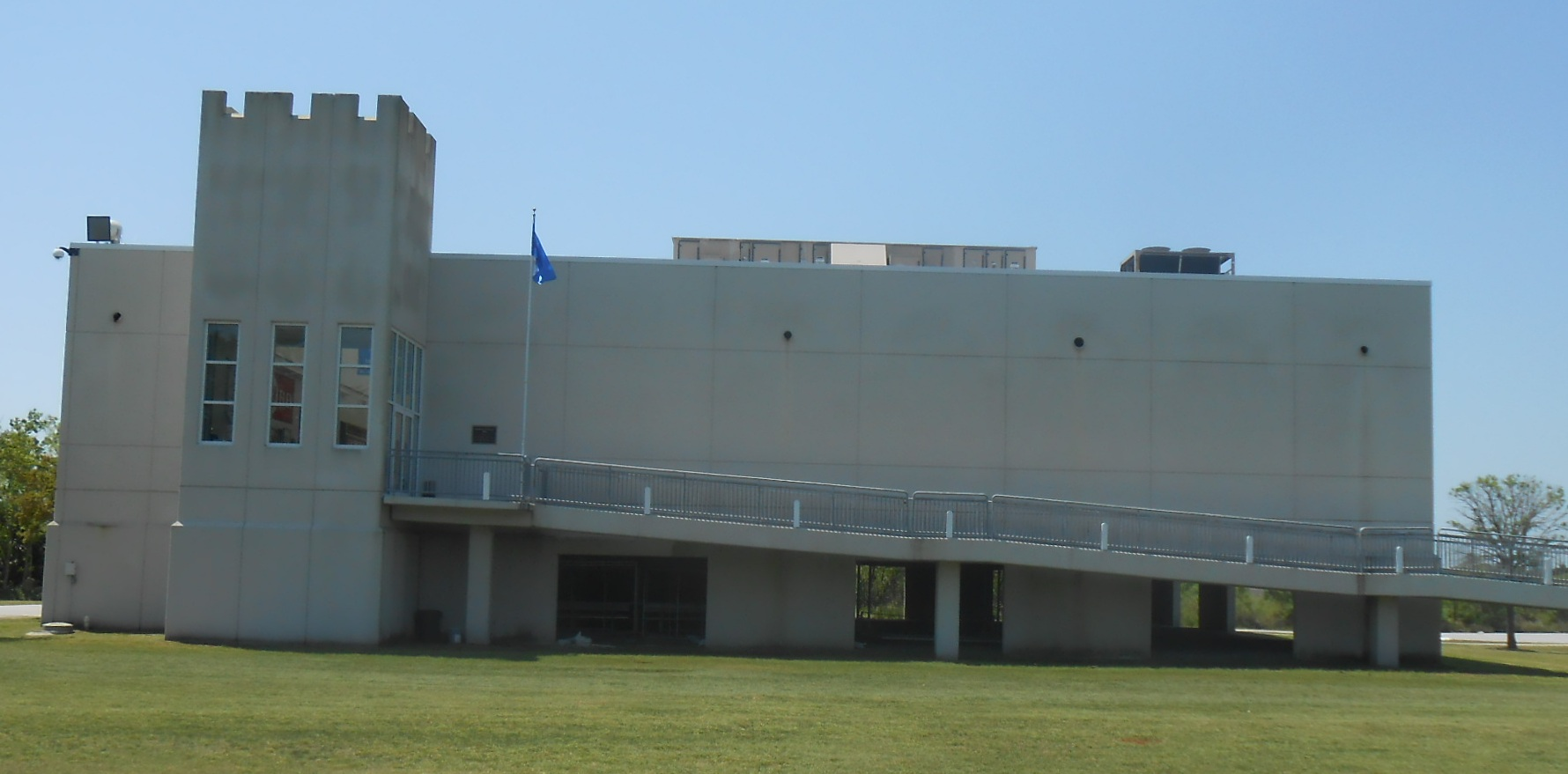
- Interactive map of Inouye Marksmanship Center
- Location: Charleston, South Carolina
- Coordinates: 32.796625°N 79.964024°W
- Owner: The Citadel
- Type: Shooting range

Construction
- Built: 2006
- Cost: $3.2 million

The Inouye Marksmanship Center is a 12,000 square foot shooting range located on the campus of The Citadel in Charleston, South Carolina. It is home to NCAA Division I The Citadel Bulldogs rifle team, as well as the club pistol team, The Citadel's ROTC programs, and the South Carolina National Guard. The range is named for Senator Daniel Inouye, who secured federal funding for the facility in 2002.

The facility hosted the 2017 Southern Conference rifle championships, as well as the annual Southeastern Air Rifle Conference championships from 2012–2016, and the 2018 NCAA Rifle Championships.
