= San Jose State Spartans women's volleyball =

American collegiate team

- Founded: 1974
- University: San Jose State University
- Athletic director: Jeff Konya
- Head coach: Todd Kress (2nd season)
- Conference: MW
- Location: San Jose, California
- Home arena: Spartan Gym, Yoshihiro Uchida Hall (capacity: c. 1,000)
- Colors: Gold, white, and blue

AIAW/NCAA tournament semifinal
- 1984

AIAW/NCAA Regional Final
- 1984

AIAW/NCAA regional semifinal
- 1982, 1984, 1985, 1986, 1987

AIAW/NCAA tournament appearance
- 1982, 1983, 1984, 1985, 1986, 1987, 1988, 1989, 1990, 1998, 2000, 2001

The San Jose State Spartans women's volleyball team represents San Jose State University in NCAA Division I college volleyball as a member of the Mountain West Conference. The program began in 1974. Since 2014, it also includes women's beach volleyball, played in the spring semester in the Southland Conference. Men's volleyball is a non-varsity sport at the university.

== History ==
The Spartans had a volleyball team as early as 1971. The program was officially organized in 1974, with Jane Ward as the first head coach; she was also head volleyball coach at Cabrillo College. Under her the Spartans finished at the top of their conference every year from 1974 to 1978 (the Northern California Intercollegiate Athletic Conference, then the Northern California Athletic Conference) and finished seventh in the NCAA Division I tournament in 1978. Sheila Silvaggio was a first team All-American in 1978.

After a single season in 1980 with Marti Brugler as head coach, the Spartans hired Dick Montgomery, formerly a men's volleyball coach at USC and Long Beach State, under whom the team topped the conference (the Northern Pacific Athletic Conference) in 1984 and 1985, went to the NCAA tournament every year, and in 1984 reached the Final Four, its highest ever national result. In September 1986, one poll ranked the team No. 1 in the nation. As of 2023, Montgomery's 191–99 record over 9 seasons gives him the highest win percentage in the history of the program, .659; he was inducted into the Spartans Hall of Fame in 2000. During Montgomery's tenure, the Spartans had two first team All-Americans: Teri DeBusk in 1985 and Lisa Ice in 1986. (Ice was a second team All-American in 1985 and is the only San Jose State athlete to win an NCAA Top Six Award, for 1986.)

After two years under John Corbelli, Craig Choate became head coach in 1993. Over 14 years, he amassed a 244–191 win–loss record (.561 win percentage), to become the program's winningest coach. In 1994, the Spartans placed second at the National Invitational Volleyball Championship. Choate was succeeded by Oscar Crespo, who retired in 2013, the Spartans' first year in the Mountain West Conference, succeeded by Jolene Shepardson. Beach volleyball was added as a spring term sport in 2014, and was coached by Shepardson's husband, Aaron Shepardson. After Shepardson's resignation in early 2020, she was succeeded by Trent Kersten; after Kersten's resignation, Todd Kress became head coach in early 2023.

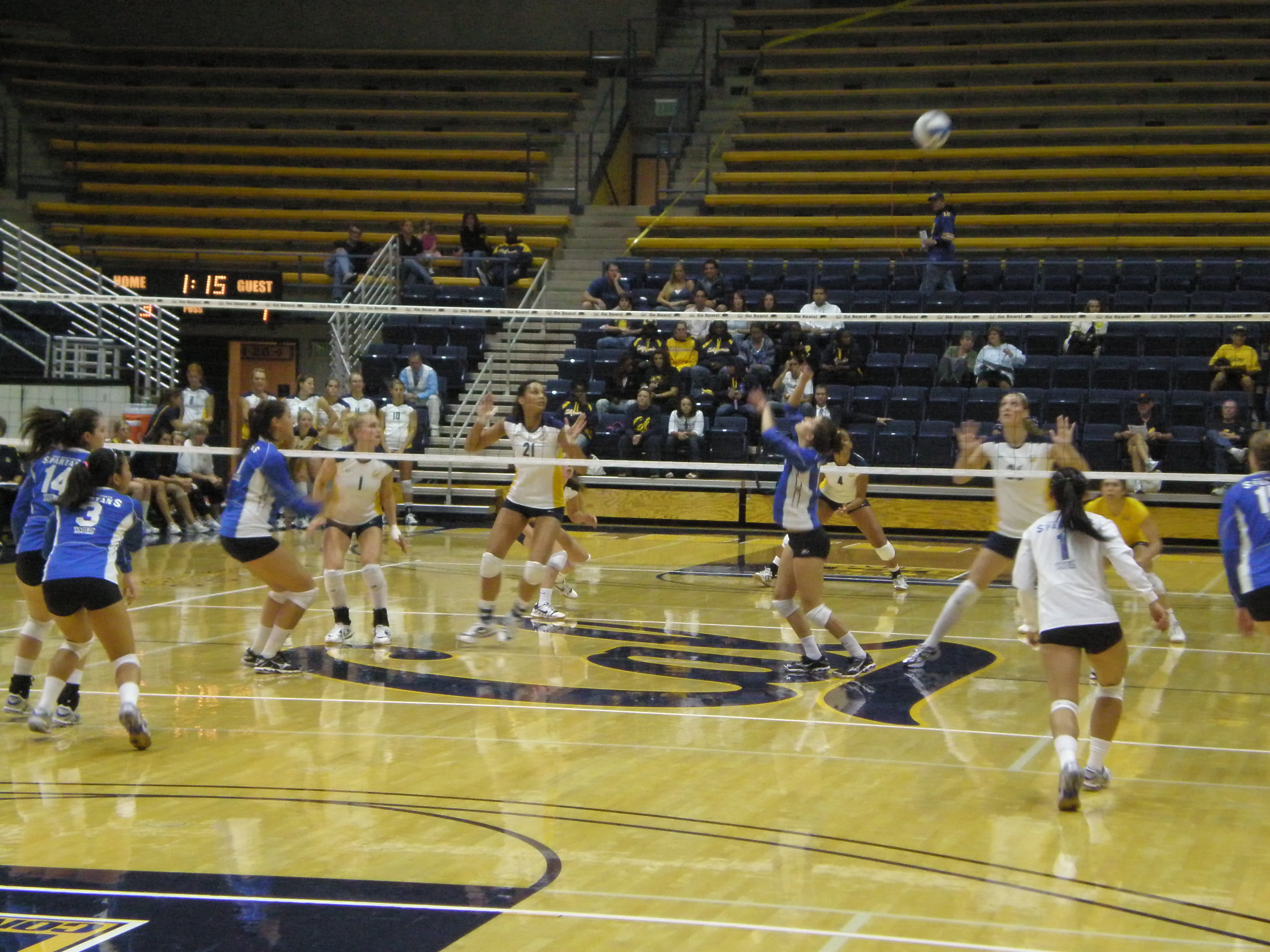
Spartans vs. Cal, 2009 (San Jose foreground, in blue)

=== 2024 season ===
In September 2024, soon after the start of the fall volleyball season, Brooke Slusser, a co-captain of the Spartans volleyball team, joined a lawsuit brought against the NCAA by the Independent Council on Women's Sports for permitting transgender athletes to play women's sports, publicly revealing that the Spartans volleyball team included a trans woman, Blaire Fleming. Fleming, who played as a girl in high school and club volleyball, was in her final year of eligibility in 2024, having been recruited by Kersten and joining the Spartans in 2022, playing for several years without protest. In late November 2024, Slusser, an assistant coach, and 10 former and current Mountain West Conference players filed suit against San Jose State, the Mountain West Conference, and others, seeking an injunction on grounds of sex discrimination; the case was rejected by a judge and an appeal was denied by the 10th Circuit Court of Appeals.

Starting with non-conference opponent the Southern Utah Thunderbirds on September 14, five teams forfeited games against San Jose, some more than once; the Spartans finished the season with a 14–7 record and after Boise State declined to play them in the semifinal, advanced on a bye to the conference final, where they were defeated by the Colorado State Rams. Of the team's 12 regular season conference wins, six were by forfeit. The team's season was a topic of national discussion, including Donald Trump endorsing a claim in the lawsuit against the NCAA that Fleming hit dangerously hard. The assistant coach was suspended after filing a Title IX complaint against San Jose State and giving what the university said was inaccurate information in an interview with Quillette. Kress said the players and coaching staff had received "appalling, hateful messages". In December, seven team members entered the NCAA transfer portal.

In February 2025, after Trump began his second term as President, the Department of Education announced that it was investigating San Jose State for allowing Fleming to be on the team. In January 2026, the Dept of Ed ruled that SJSU had violated Title IX and engaged in sex discrimination by allowing Fleming to play, and threatened "imminent enforcement action" if the university did not agree to adopt a definition of "male" and "female" solely defined by assigned sex at birth, segregate sports and intimate facilities according to said definition, agree not to contract with any entity that might violate Title IX in a similar way, restore to cis female athletes any awards potentially given to a transgender athlete over them and issue a personalized letter of apology to each one, and send a personalized apology letter to every woman that played in SJSU women's volleyball from 2022-2024. In March 2026, the university refused, and instead filed suit against the federal government. Brooke Slusser responded by going on Fox News and discussing the trauma of forming a years-long friendship with Fleming, sharing deep personal secrets with her, and moving into an apartment together – only to later find out from the Reduxx news article that Fleming was a trans woman.

=== NCAA Division I women's volleyball tournament results ===
Year	Round	Opponent	Result
1982	First round Regional semifinals	UC Santa Barbara; Hawaii	W 3–2; L 0–3
1983	First round	Cal Poly	L 1–3
1984	First round Regional semifinals Regional Finals; Semifinals	Purdue; Oregon; Fresno State; UCLA	W 3–1; W 3–0; W 3–1; L 0–3
1985	First round Regional semifinals	Long Beach State; Cal Poly	W 3–0; L 0–3
1986	First round Regional semifinals	Cal Poly; Hawaii	W 3–1; L 2–3
1987	First round Regional semifinals	Idaho State; Pacific	W 3–0; L 0–3
1988	First round	San Diego State	L 1–3
1989	First round	Pacific	L 0–3
1990	First round	Long Beach State	L 0–3
1998	First round	Colorado	L 0–3
2000	First round	Long Beach State	L 1–3
2001	First round Second round	Santa Clara; Stanford	W 3–2; L 0–3

=== Coaches ===
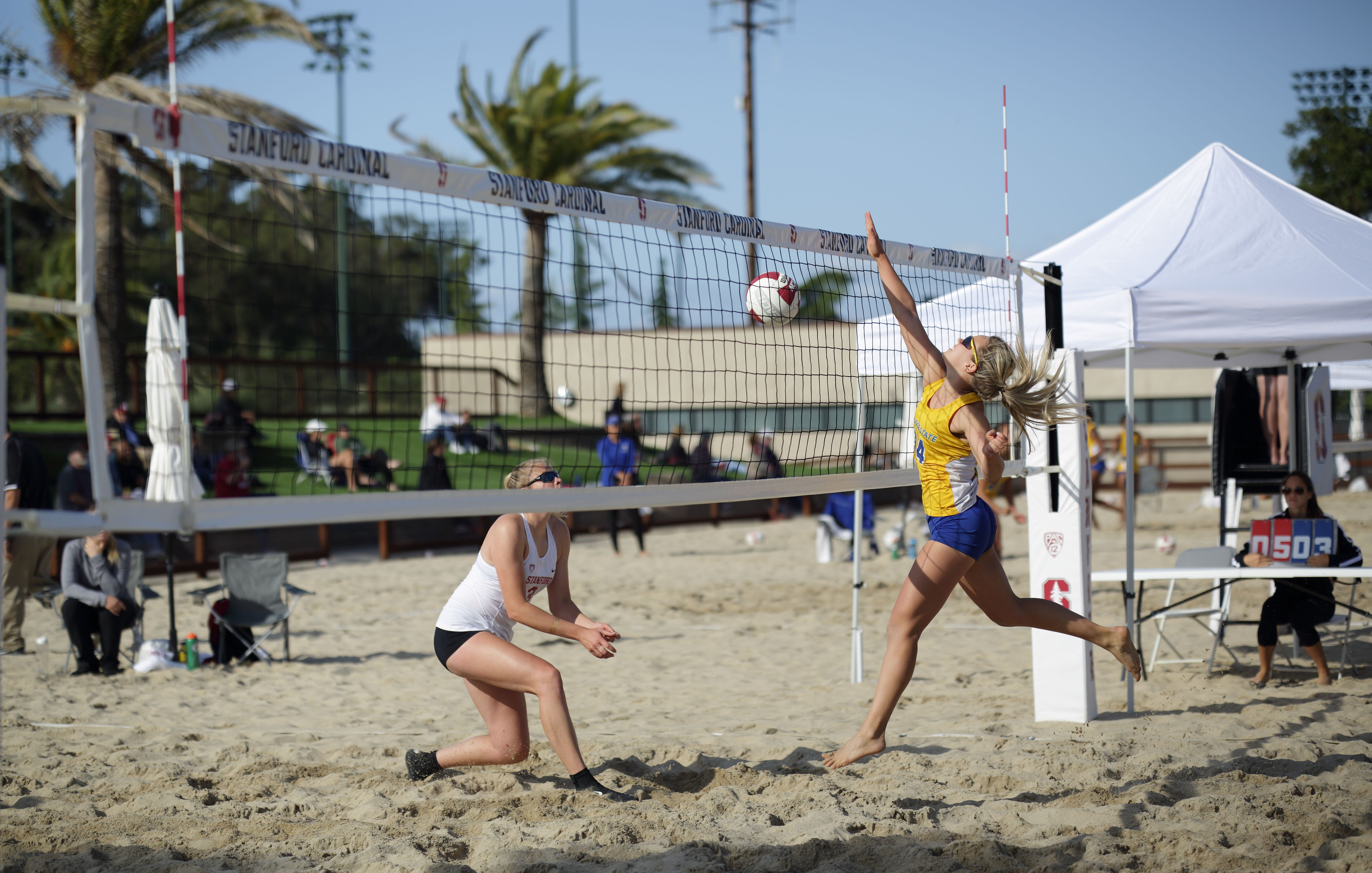
Beach volleyball 2016, Spartans vs. Stanford (Spartan spiker right, in gold)

- 1974–1979: Jane Ward
- 1980: Marti Brugler
- 1981–1989: Dick Montgomery
- 1990–1992: John Corbelli
- 1993–2006: Craig Choate
- 2007–2013: Oscar Crespo
- 2014–2019: Jolene Shepardson
- 2020–2022: Trent Kersten
- 2023–present: Todd Kress

=== Conferences ===
- 1974–1976: Northern California Intercollegiate Athletic Conference
- 1977–1981: Northern California Athletic Conference
- 1982–1985: Northern Pacific Athletic Conference
- 1986–1995: Big West Conference (renamed in 1988 from Pacific Coast Athletic Association)
- 1996–2012: Western Athletic Conference
- 2013–present: Mountain West Conference

== Notable players ==
- Savanah Leaf
