= McAlister Field House =

Multi-purpose arena in Charleston, South Carolina

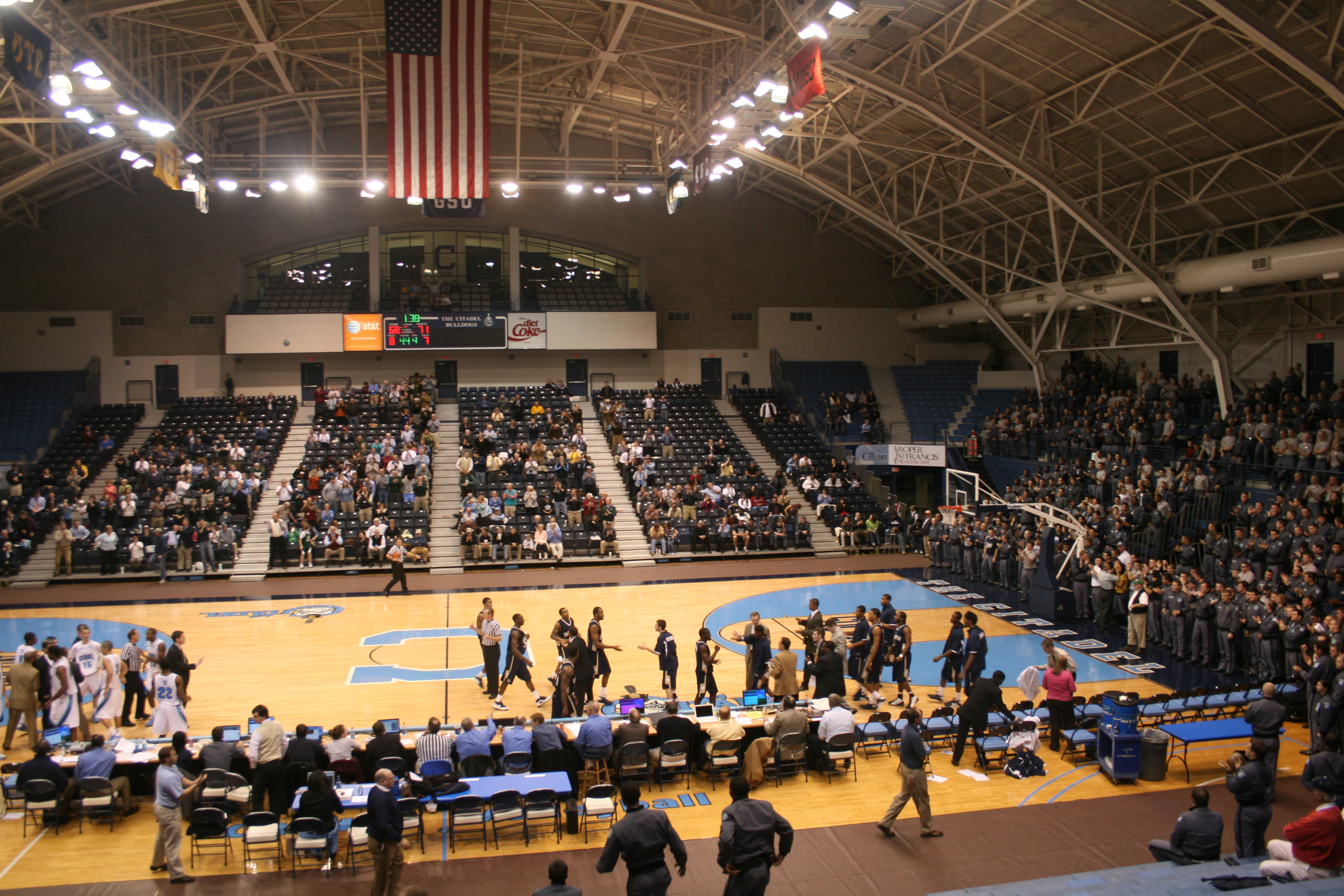
- Interactive map of McAlister Field House
- Former names: The Citadel Armory (1939–1973)
- Location: 171 Moultrie Street; Charleston, South Carolina 29409 USA
- Coordinates: 32.798508°N 79.962573°W
- Owner: The Citadel
- Operator: The Citadel
- Capacity: 6,000 (1989-present); 4,500 (1939-1989)
- Surface: Hardwood

Construction
- Groundbreaking: 1938
- Opened: 1939
- Renovated: 1989
- Cost: $465,217 ($10.8 million in 2025 dollars) $7.9 million (renovation)
- Architect: Liollio Architecture (renovation)
- General contractor: Southeastern Construction Company

Tenants
- The Citadel Bulldogs basketball, wrestling, and volleyball Lowcountry Highrollers

McAlister Field House is a 6,000-seat multi-purpose arena on the campus of The Citadel in Charleston, South Carolina, United States. It was built in 1939 and is home to The Citadel Bulldogs basketball, wrestling and volleyball teams. Office space in the facility houses athletic department staff as well as several coaches.

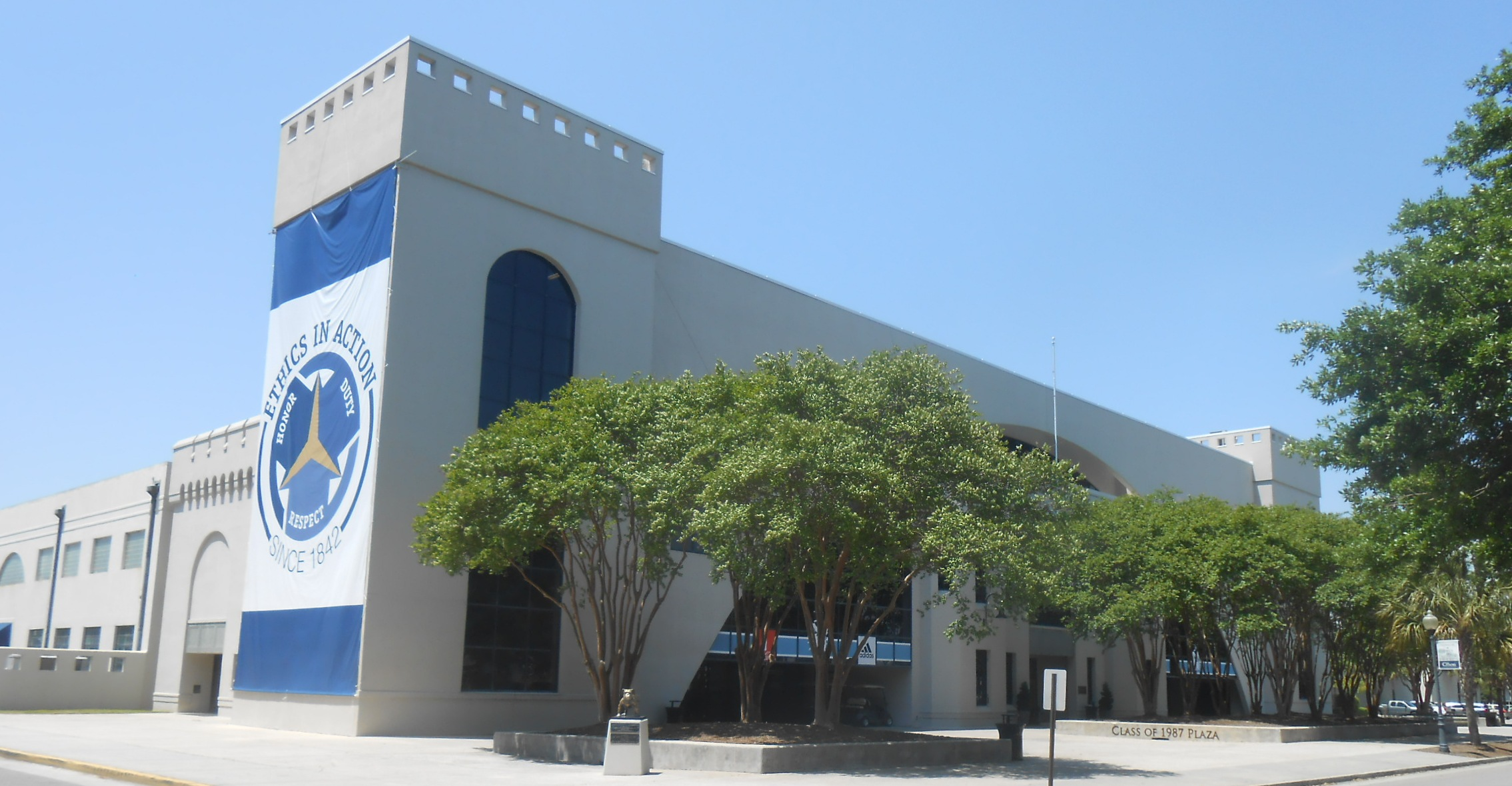

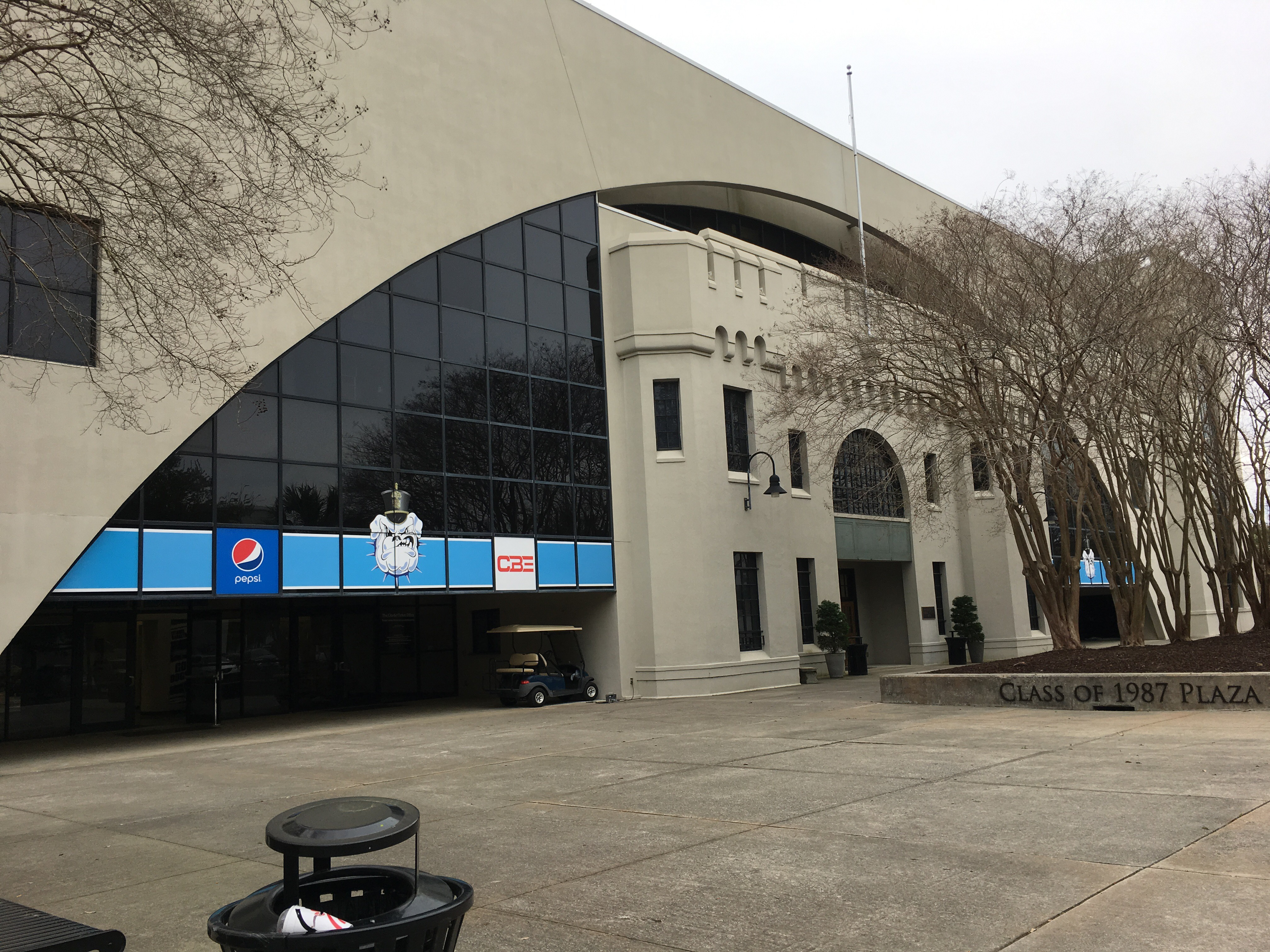

Previously known as The Citadel Armory, the facility was named in honor of Col. David S. McAlister, Citadel Class of 1924 on March 16, 1973.

The arena was renovated in 1989, and is used for entertainment events including concerts and sporting events, as well as college and high school commencements. The renovation expanded the seating capacity from 4,500 to 6,000. Since the renovation, three basketball games have sold out and filled the facility to capacity: Duke (1991), South Carolina (1997), and College of Charleston (1999). The facility has hosted several athletic tournaments, including opening rounds of the Southern Conference women's basketball tournament and the All-Academy Wrestling Championship.

On July 23, 2007, McAlister Field House was the venue for the Democratic Party's edition of the CNN-YouTube presidential debates. McAlister is also used as the venue for major speeches and addresses to the Corps of Cadets, including President George W. Bush's December 11, 2001 address.

== See also ==
- List of NCAA Division I basketball arenas
