= 2021 NCAA Division I women's volleyball tournament =

Volleyball competition

2021 NCAA women's Division I volleyball tournament
- 2021 NCAA Division I Championship
- Finals site: Nationwide Arena; Columbus, Ohio
- Champions: Wisconsin (1st title)
- Runner-up: Nebraska (10th title match)
- Semifinalists: Louisville (1st Final Four); Pittsburgh (1st Final Four)
- Winning coach: Kelly Sheffield (1st title)
- Most outstanding player: Anna Smrek (Wisconsin)
- Final Four All-Tournament Team: Dana Rettke (Wisconsin); Sydney Hilley (Wisconsin); Nicklin Hames (Nebraska); Madi Kubik (Nebraska); Anna Debeer (Louisville); Leketor Member-Meneh (Pittsburgh)

The 2021 NCAA Division I women's volleyball tournament began on December 2, 2021, and ended on December 18, 2021, to determine the Division I National Champion in women's volleyball. Wisconsin won its first NCAA national championship by defeating Big Ten rival Nebraska 3–2. The championship match was played in front of an NCAA record crowd of 18,755.

The Final Four was held at Nationwide Arena in Columbus, Ohio. The national semifinals were held on December 16 and the championship match was held on December 18.

Kentucky, from the Southeastern Conference, was the defending national champion. The Wildcats were eliminated in the second round to Illinois.

The tournament saw a particularly successful run by the Atlantic Coast Conference. Louisville, having gone a perfect 28–0 in the regular season, earned the first number one overall seed in conference history. Meanwhile, Pittsburgh earned the number three seed, its first top four seed in program history. Both teams utilized their home court advantages to earn their respective first trips to the national semifinals. Thus, the Cardinals and Panthers became the second and third semi-finalists from the conference in tournament history, and first since Florida State in 2011. Additionally, Georgia Tech also advanced to its first Regional Final since 2003, marking the first time the ACC had three Regional Finalists in one tournament.

While the ACC made history in the semifinals, the Cardinals and Panthers were joined by Wisconsin and Nebraska out of the Big Ten. Wisconsin made its third consecutive trip to the national semifinals, and was seeking its first title. Nebraska was the only semi-finalist who has won a National Championship, doing so five times. This tournament marked the fourteenth straight year that at least one member of the Big Ten reached the semifinal.

== Tournament schedule and venues ==
The first two rounds, normally referred to as the subregionals, will be played at the sites of the top 16 seeds, replicating the format done in the basketball tournaments. The regionals will be played at four non-predetermined campus sites, which will be announced on December 5.

2021 NCAA First and Second Round venues

First and Second Rounds (Subregionals)

- December 2–3
  - Gregory Gymnasium, Austin, Texas (Host: University of Texas)
  - Ferrell Center, Waco, Texas (Host: Baylor University)
  - Holloway Gymnasium, West Lafayette, Indiana (Host: Purdue University)
  - Sokol Arena, Omaha, Nebraska (Host: Creighton University)
  - O'Connell Center, Gainesville, Florida (Host: University of Florida)
- December 3–4
  - L&N Federal Credit Union Arena, Louisville, Kentucky (Host: University of Louisville)
  - Petersen Events Center, Pittsburgh, Pennsylvania (Host: University of Pittsburgh)
  - UW Field House, Madison, Wisconsin (Host: University of Wisconsin)
  - Memorial Coliseum, Lexington, Kentucky (Host: University of Kentucky)
  - O'Keefe Gymnasium, Atlanta, Georgia (Host: Georgia Institute of Technology)
  - Covelli Center, Columbus, Ohio (Host: Ohio State University)
  - Bob Devaney Sports Center, Lincoln, Nebraska (Host: University of Nebraska–Lincoln)
  - George A. Smith Fieldhouse, Provo, Utah (Host: Brigham Young University)
  - Maturi Pavilion, Minneapolis, Minnesota (Host: University of Minnesota)
  - Pauley Pavilion, Los Angeles, California (Host: University of California, Los Angeles)
  - Alaska Airlines Arena, Seattle, Washington (Host: University of Washington)
2021 NCAA Regionals and Final Four

Regional semifinals and finals

- December 9 & 11
  - Louisville Regional, Freedom Hall (Host: University of Louisville)
  - Madison Regional, Wisconsin Field House (Host: University of Wisconsin)
  - Pittsburgh Regional, Fitzgerald Field House (Host: University of Pittsburgh)
  - Austin Regional, Gregory Gymnasium (Host: University of Texas)

National semifinals and championship

- December 16 & 18
  - Nationwide Arena, Columbus, Ohio (Host: Ohio State University)

== Qualifying teams ==
The following teams automatically qualified for the 2021 NCAA field by virtue of winning their conference's tournament. Unlike the 2020 tournament that consisted of only 48 teams due to COVID-19, the 2021 tournament returned to the usual format of 64 qualifying teams.

While Penn State remains as the only team to take part in all 41 tournaments, this is the first tournament appearance for Campbell, The Citadel, UIC, Mississippi State, South Alabama, and West Virginia, for a grand total of six teams.

=== Automatic qualifiers ===
Conference	Team	Conference Record
ACC	Louisville	18–0
America East	UMBC	12–0
American	UCF	19–1
Atlantic 10	Dayton	16–0
Atlantic Sun	Florida Gulf Coast	15–1
Big 12	Texas	15–1
Big East	Creighton	16–2
Big Sky	Northern Colorado	13–3
Big South	Campbell	14–2
Big Ten	Wisconsin	17–3
Big West	Hawai'i	18–2
Colonial	Towson	12–4
C-USA	Western Kentucky	12–0
Horizon	UIC	13–3
Ivy	Brown	13–1
MAAC	Fairfield	16–2
MAC	Ball State	17–1
MEAC	Howard	12–2
Missouri Valley	Illinois State	13–5
Mountain West	Boise State	10–8
Northeast	Sacred Heart	11–3
Ohio Valley	Southeast Missouri State	14–4
Pac-12	Washington	17–3
Patriot	Colgate	13–3
SEC	Kentucky	17–1
Southern	The Citadel	7–9
Southland	Texas A&M–Corpus Christi	13–1
SWAC	Florida A&M	14–2
Summit	South Dakota	15–3
Sun Belt	South Alabama	15–1
West Coast	BYU	18–0
WAC	Utah Valley	8–6

=== Tournament seeds ===
Louisville Regional
Seed	RPI	School	Conference	Berth type	Record
1	1	Louisville	ACC	Automatic	28–0
8	7	Georgia Tech	ACC	At–Large	23–5
9	9	Ohio State	Big Ten	At–Large	25–5
16	21	Florida	SEC	At–Large	20–8
	31	Ball State	MAC	Automatic	25–6
	173	Florida A&M	SWAC	Automatic	22–1
	204	Howard	MEAC	Automatic	18–12
	11	Miami (FL)	ACC	At–Large	24–4
	35	Michigan	Big Ten	At–Large	18–11
	28	North Carolina	ACC	At–Large	21–8
	49	South Alabama	Sun Belt	Automatic	25–6
	42	South Carolina	SEC	At–Large	14-14
	29	Tennessee	SEC	At–Large	19–9
	213	The Citadel	SoCon	Automatic	14–11
	129	UIC	Horizon	Automatic	20–11
	18	Western Kentucky	C-USA	Automatic	27–1

Pittsburgh Regional
Seed	RPI	School	Conference	Berth type	Record
3	2	Pittsburgh	ACC	At–Large	26–3
6	10	Purdue	Big Ten	At–Large	23–6
11	15	BYU	WCC	Automatic	28–1
14	8	Creighton	Big East	Automatic	30–3
	90	Boise State	Mountain West	Automatic	24–10
	40	Dayton	A-10	Automatic	25–5
	67	Illinois State	MVC	Automatic	19–13
	34	Kansas	Big 12	At–Large	16–11
	16	Marquette	Big East	At–Large	26–5
	54	Ole Miss	SEC	At–Large	21–8
	23	Oregon	Pac-12	At–Large	22–8
	27	Penn State	Big Ten	At–Large	20–10
	63	Towson	Colonial	Automatic	26–4
	172	UMBC	America East	Automatic	19–11
	20	Utah	Pac-12	At–Large	21–8
	76	Utah Valley	WAC	Automatic	16–12

Madison Regional
Seed	RPI	School	Conference	Berth type	Record
4	4	Wisconsin	Big Ten	Automatic	25–3
5	5	Baylor	Big 12	At–Large	20–5
12	17	Minnesota	Big Ten	At–Large	19–8
13	13	UCLA	Pac-12	At–Large	23–5
	106	Colgate	Patriot	Automatic	18–9
	117	Fairfield	MAAC	Automatic	24–8
	33	Florida Gulf Coast	ASUN	Automatic	26–5
	48	Iowa State	Big 12	At–Large	16–11
	56	Northern Colorado	Big Sky	Automatic	24–6
	37	Pepperdine	WCC	At–Large	22–5
	70	South Dakota	Summit	Automatic	20–9
	26	Stanford	Pac-12	At–Large	18–10
	99	Texas A&M–CC	Southland	Automatic	19–9
	38	Texas Tech	Big 12	At–Large	17–12
	22	UCF	AAC	Automatic	26–6
	36	Washington State	Pac-12	At–Large	19–11

Austin Regional
Seed	RPI	School	Conference	Berth type	Record
2	3	Texas	Big 12	Automatic	24–1
7	6	Kentucky	SEC	Automatic	24–4
10	12	Nebraska	Big Ten	At–Large	21–7
15	14	Washington	Pac-12	Automatic	24–4
	73	Brown	Ivy	Automatic	20–5
	94	Campbell	Big South	Automatic	21–9
	19	Florida State	ACC	At–Large	19–9
	57	Hawai'i	Big West	Automatic	21–7
	30	Illinois	Big Ten	At–Large	20–11
	47	Kansas State	Big 12	At–Large	15–12
	25	Mississippi State	SEC	At–Large	25–5
	24	Rice	C-USA	At–Large	19–6
	138	Sacred Heart	NEC	Automatic	19–9
	39	San Diego	WCC	At–Large	20–7
	88	Southeast Missouri State	OVC	Automatic	26–7
	43	West Virginia	Big 12	At–Large	19–9

== Bracket ==
The tournament bracket was announced on November 28, 2021. Times are shown in Eastern Standard Time.

=== Louisville, KY Regional ===
First round December 2 & 3
1	Louisville	3
UIC	0
Louisville, KY
Ball State	3
Michigan	2
South Alabama	1
Miami (FL)	3
Gainesville, FL
Florida A&M	0
16	Florida	3
9	Ohio State	3
Howard	0
Columbus, OH
North Carolina	1
Tennessee	3
South Carolina	0
Western Kentucky	3
Atlanta, GA
The Citadel	0
8	Georgia Tech	3

Second Round; December 3 & 4
1	Louisville	3
Ball State	0
Miami (FL)	0
16	Florida	3
9	Ohio State	3
Tennessee	1
Western Kentucky	0
8	Georgia Tech	3

Regional semifinals December 9
1	Louisville	3
16	Florida	0
9	Ohio State	0
8	Georgia Tech	3

Regional Finals; December 11
1	Louisville	3
8	Georgia Tech	1

=== Schedule ===
==== First round ====
December 2, 2021; 4:30 p.m. EST	Miami (FL)	3–1	South Alabama	O'Connell Center, Gainesville, Florida; Attendance: 422; Referees: James Phillips, Tony Cothron, Elizabeth Smith, John Bear
December 2, 2021; 4:30 p.m. EST	(23–25, 25–20, 29–27, 25–19); Recap			O'Connell Center, Gainesville, Florida; Attendance: 422; Referees: James Phillips, Tony Cothron, Elizabeth Smith, John Bear

December 2, 2021; 8:00 p.m. EST	(16) Florida	3–0	Florida A&M	O'Connell Center, Gainesville, Florida; Attendance: 2,057; Referees: Wade Brance, Darin Clark, Robert Skidmore, Hugh Hernesman
December 2, 2021; 8:00 p.m. EST	(25–11, 25–14, 25–8); Recap			O'Connell Center, Gainesville, Florida; Attendance: 2,057; Referees: Wade Brance, Darin Clark, Robert Skidmore, Hugh Hernesman

December 3, 2021; 4:00 p.m. EST	Michigan	2–3	Ball State	L&N Federal Credit Union Arena, Louisville, Kentucky; Referees: Brian Hemelgarn, Marty Pruchko
December 3, 2021; 4:00 p.m. EST	(17–25, 25–22, 18–25, 27–25, 8–15); Recap			L&N Federal Credit Union Arena, Louisville, Kentucky; Referees: Brian Hemelgarn, Marty Pruchko

December 3, 2021; 4:30 p.m. EST	Western Kentucky	3–0	South Carolina	O'Keefe Gymnasium, Atlanta, Georgia; Attendance: 1,200; Referees: Michelle Prater, Morgan Shannon, Bryson Bryan-Terry, Scott Thompson
December 3, 2021; 4:30 p.m. EST	(25–20, 25–13, 25–19); Recap			O'Keefe Gymnasium, Atlanta, Georgia; Attendance: 1,200; Referees: Michelle Prater, Morgan Shannon, Bryson Bryan-Terry, Scott Thompson

December 3, 2021; 5:00 p.m. EST	Tennessee	3–1	North Carolina	Covelli Center, Columbus, Ohio; Referees: Mark Prater, Jeff McKinney, Mary Gray, Drew Puckerin
December 3, 2021; 5:00 p.m. EST	(25–20, 25–19, 24–26, 25–15); Recap			Covelli Center, Columbus, Ohio; Referees: Mark Prater, Jeff McKinney, Mary Gray, Drew Puckerin

December 3, 2021; 7:00 p.m. EST	(1) Louisville	3–0	UIC	L&N Federal Credit Union Arena, Louisville, Kentucky; Attendance: 993; Referees: Bill Thornburgh, Donnie Goodwin
December 3, 2021; 7:00 p.m. EST	(25–11, 25–20, 25–11); Recap			L&N Federal Credit Union Arena, Louisville, Kentucky; Attendance: 993; Referees: Bill Thornburgh, Donnie Goodwin

December 3, 2021; 7:00 p.m. EST	(8) Georgia Tech	3–0	The Citadel	O'Keefe Gymnasium, Atlanta, Georgia; Attendance: 1,200; Referees: Kevin Wendelboe, Michael O'Connor, Danier Rager, Jakob Prater
December 3, 2021; 7:00 p.m. EST	(25–21, 25–15, 28–26); Recap			O'Keefe Gymnasium, Atlanta, Georgia; Attendance: 1,200; Referees: Kevin Wendelboe, Michael O'Connor, Danier Rager, Jakob Prater

December 3, 2021; 7:00 p.m. EST	(9) Ohio State	3–0	Howard	Covelli Center, Columbus, Ohio; Attendance: 2,787; Referees: Chuck Fleet, Josh Hall, Brian Smith, Christy Alltop
December 3, 2021; 7:00 p.m. EST	(25–12, 25–7, 25–10); Recap			Covelli Center, Columbus, Ohio; Attendance: 2,787; Referees: Chuck Fleet, Josh Hall, Brian Smith, Christy Alltop

==== Second round ====
December 3, 2021; 7:00 p.m. EST	(16) Florida	3–0	Miami (FL)	O'Connell Center, Gainesville, Florida; Attendance: 2,311; Referees: Wade Brence, Darin Clark, Hugh Hernesman, Robert Skidmore
December 3, 2021; 7:00 p.m. EST	(25–15, 25–20, 25–16); Recap			O'Connell Center, Gainesville, Florida; Attendance: 2,311; Referees: Wade Brence, Darin Clark, Hugh Hernesman, Robert Skidmore

December 4, 2021; 6:00 p.m. EST	(1) Louisville	3–0	Ball State	L&N Federal Credit Union Arena, Louisville, Kentucky; Attendance: 1,055; Referees: Brian Hemelgarn, Marty Prochko
December 4, 2021; 6:00 p.m. EST	(29–27, 25–11, 25–19); Recap			L&N Federal Credit Union Arena, Louisville, Kentucky; Attendance: 1,055; Referees: Brian Hemelgarn, Marty Prochko

December 4, 2021; 6:00 p.m. EST	(9) Ohio State	3–1	Tennessee	Covelli Center, Columbus, Ohio; Attendance: 2,868; Referees: Mark Prater, Josh Hall, Christy Alltop, Drew Puckerin
December 4, 2021; 6:00 p.m. EST	(25–18, 14–25, 25–21, 25–21); Recap			Covelli Center, Columbus, Ohio; Attendance: 2,868; Referees: Mark Prater, Josh Hall, Christy Alltop, Drew Puckerin

December 4, 2021; 7:00 p.m. EST	(8) Georgia Tech	3–0	Western Kentucky	O'Keefe Gymnasium, Atlanta, Georgia; Attendance: 1,200; Referees: Michelle Prater, Michael O'Connor, Scott Thompson, Bryson Bryan-Terry
December 4, 2021; 7:00 p.m. EST	(25–21, 25–18, 25–23); Recap			O'Keefe Gymnasium, Atlanta, Georgia; Attendance: 1,200; Referees: Michelle Prater, Michael O'Connor, Scott Thompson, Bryson Bryan-Terry

==== Regional semifinals ====
December 9, 2021; 1:00 p.m. EST	(1) Louisville	3–0	(16) Florida	Freedom Hall, Louisville, Kentucky; Attendance: 3089; Referees: Pati Rolf, Wade Dubois, Philip Ems, Henry Chen, Robyn Courchane
December 9, 2021; 1:00 p.m. EST	(25–16, 25–22, 25–12); Recap			Freedom Hall, Louisville, Kentucky; Attendance: 3089; Referees: Pati Rolf, Wade Dubois, Philip Ems, Henry Chen, Robyn Courchane

December 9, 2021; 3:00 p.m. EST	(9) Ohio State	0–3	(8) Georgia Tech	Freedom Hall, Louisville, Kentucky; Attendance: 3089; Referees: Stephen Shepherd, Robyn Courchane, Kyp Harasymowycz, Jennifer McIntosh, Wade Dubois
December 9, 2021; 3:00 p.m. EST	(22–25, 24–26, 21–25); Recap			Freedom Hall, Louisville, Kentucky; Attendance: 3089; Referees: Stephen Shepherd, Robyn Courchane, Kyp Harasymowycz, Jennifer McIntosh, Wade Dubois

==== Regional final ====
December 11, 2021; 6:00 p.m. EST	(8) Georgia Tech	1–3	(1) Louisville	Freedom Hall, Louisville, Kentucky; Attendance: 5,917
December 11, 2021; 6:00 p.m. EST	(18–25, 25–21, 21–25, 20–25); Recap			Freedom Hall, Louisville, Kentucky; Attendance: 5,917

=== Madison, WI Regional ===
First round December 2 & 3
5	Baylor	3
Texas A&M–Corpus Christi	0
Waco, TX
Northern Colorado	0
Washington State	3
Iowa State	1
Stanford	3
Minneapolis, MN
South Dakota	0
12	Minnesota	3
13	UCLA	3
Fairfield	0
Los Angeles, CA
Pepperdine	1
UCF	3
Florida Gulf Coast	3
Texas Tech	2
Madison, WI
Colgate	0
4	Wisconsin	3

Second Round; December 3 & 4
5	Baylor	3
Washington State	0
Stanford	0
12	Minnesota	3
13	UCLA	3
UCF	2
Florida Gulf Coast	0
4	Wisconsin	3

Regional semifinals December 9
5	Baylor	2
12	Minnesota	3
13	UCLA	0
4	Wisconsin	3

Regional Finals; December 11
12	Minnesota	0
4	Wisconsin	3

=== Schedule ===
==== First round ====
December 2, 2021; 5:30 p.m. EST	Washington State	3–0	Northern Colorado	Ferrell Center, Waco, Texas; Attendance: 603; Referees: Ryan MacDowell, Thang Nguyen, Jeff Peters, Pat Kekic
December 2, 2021; 5:30 p.m. EST	(25–17, 25–15, 25–20); Recap			Ferrell Center, Waco, Texas; Attendance: 603; Referees: Ryan MacDowell, Thang Nguyen, Jeff Peters, Pat Kekic

December 2, 2021; 8:00 p.m. EST	(5) Baylor	3–0	Texas A&M–Corpus Christi	Ferrell Center, Waco, Texas; Attendance: 1,004; Referees: Chad Klunk, Traci Belton, Sheri Banwart, Blaine Halberstadt
December 2, 2021; 8:00 p.m. EST	(25–22, 25–12, 26–24); Recap			Ferrell Center, Waco, Texas; Attendance: 1,004; Referees: Chad Klunk, Traci Belton, Sheri Banwart, Blaine Halberstadt

December 3, 2021; 5:30 p.m. EST	Stanford	3–1	Iowa State	Maturi Pavilion, Minneapolis, Minnesota; Referees: Julie Voeck, Dan Houser, Jeff Krause, Sarah Myres
December 3, 2021; 5:30 p.m. EST	(25–19, 23–25, 25–18, 25–17); Recap			Maturi Pavilion, Minneapolis, Minnesota; Referees: Julie Voeck, Dan Houser, Jeff Krause, Sarah Myres

December 3, 2021; 5:30 p.m. EST	Texas Tech	2–3	Florida Gulf Coast	UW Field House, Madison, Wisconsin; Referees: Pati Rolf, Paul Albright, Chris Haworth, Scott Prox
December 3, 2021; 5:30 p.m. EST	(25–14, 25–16, 23–25, 15–25, 7–15); Recap			UW Field House, Madison, Wisconsin; Referees: Pati Rolf, Paul Albright, Chris Haworth, Scott Prox

December 3, 2021; 7:30 p.m. EST	UCF	3–1	Pepperdine	Pauley Pavilion, Los Angeles, California; Attendance: 518
December 3, 2021; 7:30 p.m. EST	(25–19, 25–23, 24–26, 25–21); Recap			Pauley Pavilion, Los Angeles, California; Attendance: 518

December 3, 2021; 8:00 p.m. EST	(4) Wisconsin	3–0	Colgate	UW Field House, Madison, Wisconsin; Attendance: 7,540
December 3, 2021; 8:00 p.m. EST	(25–12, 25–15, 25–14); Recap			UW Field House, Madison, Wisconsin; Attendance: 7,540

December 3, 2021; 8:00 p.m. EST	(12) Minnesota	3–0	South Dakota	Maturi Pavilion, Minneapolis, Minnesota; Attendance: 4,280; Referees: Tim Harlow, Robyn Courchane, Ted Mosre, Kelsi Jurik
December 3, 2021; 8:00 p.m. EST	(25–19, 25–22, 25–17); Recap			Maturi Pavilion, Minneapolis, Minnesota; Attendance: 4,280; Referees: Tim Harlow, Robyn Courchane, Ted Mosre, Kelsi Jurik

December 3, 2021; 10:00 p.m. EST	(13) UCLA	3–0	Fairfield	Pauley Pavilion, Los Angeles, California; Attendance: 1,375
December 3, 2021; 10:00 p.m. EST	(29–27, 25–23, 26–24); Recap			Pauley Pavilion, Los Angeles, California; Attendance: 1,375

==== Second round ====
December 3, 2021; 8:00 p.m. EST	(5) Baylor	3–0	Washington State	Ferrell Center, Waco, Texas; Attendance: 1,078; Referees: Ryan MacDowell, Thang Nguyen, Jeff Peters, Pat Kekic
December 3, 2021; 8:00 p.m. EST	(27–25, 25–21, 25–20); Recap			Ferrell Center, Waco, Texas; Attendance: 1,078; Referees: Ryan MacDowell, Thang Nguyen, Jeff Peters, Pat Kekic

December 4, 2021; 7:00 p.m. EST	(4) Wisconsin	3–0	Florida Gulf Coast	UW Field House, Madison, Wisconsin; Attendance: 7,540; Referees: Pati Rolf, Joseph Gustafson, Chris Haworth, Tracy LeVine
December 4, 2021; 7:00 p.m. EST	(25–17, 25–20, 25–15); Recap			UW Field House, Madison, Wisconsin; Attendance: 7,540; Referees: Pati Rolf, Joseph Gustafson, Chris Haworth, Tracy LeVine

December 4, 2021; 8:00 p.m. EST	(12) Minnesota	3–0	Stanford	Maturi Pavilion, Minneapolis, Minnesota; Attendance: 4,448; Referees: Julie Voeck, Robyn Courchane, Tim Harlow, Jeff Krause
December 4, 2021; 8:00 p.m. EST	(25–20, 25–18, 25–17); Recap			Maturi Pavilion, Minneapolis, Minnesota; Attendance: 4,448; Referees: Julie Voeck, Robyn Courchane, Tim Harlow, Jeff Krause

December 4, 2021; 10:00 p.m. EST	(13) UCLA	3–2	UCF	Pauley Pavilion, Los Angeles, California; Attendance: 1,143
December 4, 2021; 10:00 p.m. EST	(25–27, 25–13, 19–25, 25–22, 15–7); Recap			Pauley Pavilion, Los Angeles, California; Attendance: 1,143

==== Regional semifinals ====
December 9, 2021; 3:00 p.m. EST	(5) Baylor	2–3	(12) Minnesota	UW Field House, Madison, Wisconsin
December 9, 2021; 3:00 p.m. EST	(28–26, 22–25, 25–20, 23–25, 10–15); Recap			UW Field House, Madison, Wisconsin

December 9, 2021; 5:00 p.m. EST	(13) UCLA	0–3	(4) Wisconsin	UW Field House, Madison, Wisconsin; Attendance: 6,851; Referees: Wade Brence, Mara Wager, Craig Wiedel, Jeff Krause
December 9, 2021; 5:00 p.m. EST	(16–25, 18–25, 17–25); Recap			UW Field House, Madison, Wisconsin; Attendance: 6,851; Referees: Wade Brence, Mara Wager, Craig Wiedel, Jeff Krause

==== Regional final ====
December 11, 2021; 8:00 p.m. EST	(12) Minnesota	0–3	(4) Wisconsin	UW Field House, Madison, Wisconsin; Attendance: 7,540
December 11, 2021; 8:00 p.m. EST	(18–25, 24–26, 22–25); Recap			UW Field House, Madison, Wisconsin; Attendance: 7,540

=== Pittsburgh, PA Regional ===
First round December 2 & 3
3	Pittsburgh	3
UMBC	0
Pittsburgh, PA
Towson	1
Penn State	3
Oregon	0
Kansas	3
Omaha, NE
Ole Miss	0
14	Creighton	3
11	BYU	3
Boise State	0
Provo, UT
Utah Valley	1
Utah	3
Dayton	3
Marquette	1
West Lafayette, IN
Illinois State	0
6	Purdue	3

Second Round; December 3 & 4
3	Pittsburgh	3
Penn State	1
Kansas	3
14	Creighton	1
11	BYU	3
Utah	1
Dayton	2
6	Purdue	3

Regional semifinals December 9
3	Pittsburgh	3
Kansas	0
11	BYU	2
6	Purdue	3

Regional Finals; December 11
3	Pittsburgh	3
6	Purdue	1

=== Schedule ===
==== First round ====
December 2, 2021; 4:30 p.m. EST	Marquette	1–3	Dayton	Holloway Gymnasium, West Lafayette, Indiana; Referees: Devonie McLarty, Krystian Krzyak, Jason Marshall, Henry Chen
December 2, 2021; 4:30 p.m. EST	(20–25, 21–25, 26–24, 23–25); Recap			Holloway Gymnasium, West Lafayette, Indiana; Referees: Devonie McLarty, Krystian Krzyak, Jason Marshall, Henry Chen

December 2, 2021; 5:30 p.m. EST	Oregon	0–3	Kansas	Sokol Arena, Omaha, Nebraska; Referees: Bill Stanley, Christina Fiebich, Craig Wiedel, Dave Soderstrom
December 2, 2021; 5:30 p.m. EST	(21–25, 21–25, 22–25); Recap			Sokol Arena, Omaha, Nebraska; Referees: Bill Stanley, Christina Fiebich, Craig Wiedel, Dave Soderstrom

December 2, 2021; 7:00 p.m. EST	(6) Purdue	3–0	Illinois State	Holloway Gymnasium, West Lafayette, Indiana; Attendance: 2,415; Referees: Jung Park, Rod Rodriguez, Katie Bates, Jeff Morris
December 2, 2021; 7:00 p.m. EST	(25–21, 25–17, 25–11); Recap			Holloway Gymnasium, West Lafayette, Indiana; Attendance: 2,415; Referees: Jung Park, Rod Rodriguez, Katie Bates, Jeff Morris

December 2, 2021; 8:00 p.m. EST	(14) Creighton	3–0	Ole Miss	Sokol Arena, Omaha, Nebraska; Attendance: 2,351; Referees: Daryl Korinek, Brett Myres, Amber Nicholson, John Sutton
December 2, 2021; 8:00 p.m. EST	(25–21, 25–15, 25–13); Recap			Sokol Arena, Omaha, Nebraska; Attendance: 2,351; Referees: Daryl Korinek, Brett Myres, Amber Nicholson, John Sutton

December 3, 2021; 4:00 p.m. EST	Penn State	3–1	Towson	Petersen Events Center, Pittsburgh, Pennsylvania; Attendance: 2,203; Referees: Carla Bunner, Kurt Fulmer, David Atkinson, Shera Moxley
December 3, 2021; 4:00 p.m. EST	(25–11, 25–27, 25–20, 25–21); Recap			Petersen Events Center, Pittsburgh, Pennsylvania; Attendance: 2,203; Referees: Carla Bunner, Kurt Fulmer, David Atkinson, Shera Moxley

December 3, 2021; 6:00 p.m. EST	Utah	3–1	Utah Valley	Smith Fieldhouse, Provo, Utah; Attendance: 1,100
December 3, 2021; 6:00 p.m. EST	(25–16, 22–25, 25–19, 25–11); Recap			Smith Fieldhouse, Provo, Utah; Attendance: 1,100

December 3, 2021; 7:00 p.m. EST	(3) Pittsburgh	3–0	UMBC	Petersen Events Center, Pittsburgh, Pennsylvania; Attendance: 2,344; Referees: Landry Homsher, Scott Thompson, Timothy Rough, Chad Oberholtzer
December 3, 2021; 7:00 p.m. EST	(25–23, 25–13, 25–18); Recap			Petersen Events Center, Pittsburgh, Pennsylvania; Attendance: 2,344; Referees: Landry Homsher, Scott Thompson, Timothy Rough, Chad Oberholtzer

December 3, 2021; 9:00 p.m. EST	(11) BYU	3–0	Boise State	Smith Fieldhouse, Provo, Utah; Attendance: 5,340; Referees: Daphne Nelson, Ron Pelham, Kaylene Cragun, James Rees
December 3, 2021; 9:00 p.m. EST	(25–6, 25–19, 25–10); Recap			Smith Fieldhouse, Provo, Utah; Attendance: 5,340; Referees: Daphne Nelson, Ron Pelham, Kaylene Cragun, James Rees

==== Second round ====
December 3, 2021; 5:00 p.m. EST	(6) Purdue	3–2	Dayton	Holloway Gymnasium, West Lafayette, Indiana; Attendance: 2,415; Referees: Devonie McLarty, Rod Rodriguez, Henry Chen, Jeff Morris
December 3, 2021; 5:00 p.m. EST	(25–27, 19–25, 25–15, 25–6, 15–5); Recap			Holloway Gymnasium, West Lafayette, Indiana; Attendance: 2,415; Referees: Devonie McLarty, Rod Rodriguez, Henry Chen, Jeff Morris

December 3, 2021; 8:00 p.m. EST	(14) Creighton	1–3	Kansas	Sokol Arena, Omaha, Nebraska; Attendance: 2,389; Referees: Bill Stanley, Brett Myres, Craig Wiedel, Amber Nicholson
December 3, 2021; 8:00 p.m. EST	(13–25, 24–26, 25–19, 22–25); Recap			Sokol Arena, Omaha, Nebraska; Attendance: 2,389; Referees: Bill Stanley, Brett Myres, Craig Wiedel, Amber Nicholson

December 4, 2021; 7:00 p.m. EST	(3) Pittsburgh	3–1	Penn State	Petersen Events Center, Pittsburgh, Pennsylvania; Attendance: 2,593; Referees: Carla Bunner, Kurt Fulmer, Shera Moxley, Chad Oberholtzer
December 4, 2021; 7:00 p.m. EST	(25–22, 23–25, 25–22, 25–23); Recap			Petersen Events Center, Pittsburgh, Pennsylvania; Attendance: 2,593; Referees: Carla Bunner, Kurt Fulmer, Shera Moxley, Chad Oberholtzer

December 4, 2021; 9:00 p.m. EST	(11) BYU	3–1	Utah	Smith Fieldhouse, Provo, Utah; Attendance: 4,729
December 4, 2021; 9:00 p.m. EST	(17–25, 25–22, 25–23, 25–23); Recap			Smith Fieldhouse, Provo, Utah; Attendance: 4,729

==== Regional semifinals ====
December 9, 2021; 1:00 p.m. EST	(3) Pittsburgh	3–0	Kansas	Fitzgerald Field House, Pittsburgh, Pennsylvania; Attendance: 1644; Referees: Julie Voeck, Joe Gustafson, Drew Puckerin, Rachel Jensen
December 9, 2021; 1:00 p.m. EST	(25–19, 25–21, 25–18); Recap			Fitzgerald Field House, Pittsburgh, Pennsylvania; Attendance: 1644; Referees: Julie Voeck, Joe Gustafson, Drew Puckerin, Rachel Jensen

December 9, 2021; 11:00 a.m. EST	(11) BYU	2–3	(6) Purdue	Fitzgerald Field House, Pittsburgh, Pennsylvania; Attendance: 1479; Referees: Ryan MacDowell, Sergio Gonzalez, Shera Moxley, Michael Behrens
December 9, 2021; 11:00 a.m. EST	(12–25, 25–16, 25–21, 13–25, 16–18); Recap			Fitzgerald Field House, Pittsburgh, Pennsylvania; Attendance: 1479; Referees: Ryan MacDowell, Sergio Gonzalez, Shera Moxley, Michael Behrens

==== Regional final ====
December 11, 2021; 4:00 p.m. EST	(6) Purdue	1–3	(3) Pittsburgh	Fitzgerald Field House, Pittsburgh, Pennsylvania; Attendance: 3052; Referees: Ryan MacDowell, Sergio Gonzalez, Rachel Jensen, Shera Moxley
December 11, 2021; 4:00 p.m. EST	(20–25, 30–28, 20–25, 15–25); Recap			Fitzgerald Field House, Pittsburgh, Pennsylvania; Attendance: 3052; Referees: Ryan MacDowell, Sergio Gonzalez, Rachel Jensen, Shera Moxley

=== Austin, TX Regional ===
First round December 2 & 3
7	Kentucky	3
Southeast Missouri State	0
Lexington, KY
West Virginia	1
Illinois	3
Kansas State	0
Florida State	3
Lincoln, NE
Campbell	0
10	Nebraska	3
15	Washington	3
Brown	0
Seattle, WA
Hawaii	3
Mississippi State	2
Rice	3
San Diego	0
Austin, TX
Sacred Heart	0
2	Texas	3

Second Round; December 3 & 4
7	Kentucky	1
Illinois	3
Florida State	0
10	Nebraska	3
15	Washington	3
Hawaii	0
Rice	0
2	Texas	3

Regional semifinals December 9
Illinois	0
10	Nebraska	3
15	Washington	2
2	Texas	3

Regional Finals; December 11
10	Nebraska	3
2	Texas	1

=== Schedule ===
==== First round ====
December 2, 2021; 5:00 p.m. EST	San Diego	0–3	Rice	Gregory Gymnasium, Austin, Texas; Referees: April Fricke, Richard Bleau
December 2, 2021; 5:00 p.m. EST	(20–25, 19–25, 20–25); Recap			Gregory Gymnasium, Austin, Texas; Referees: April Fricke, Richard Bleau

December 2, 2021; 8:00 p.m. EST	(2) Texas	3–0	Sacred Heart	Gregory Gymnasium, Austin, Texas; Attendance: 3,172; Referees: Joe Lizama, Jeff Kushaney
December 2, 2021; 8:00 p.m. EST	(25–19, 25–17, 25–19); Recap			Gregory Gymnasium, Austin, Texas; Attendance: 3,172; Referees: Joe Lizama, Jeff Kushaney

December 3, 2021; 5:00 p.m. EST	Illinois	3–1	West Virginia	Memorial Coliseum, Lexington, Kentucky
December 3, 2021; 5:00 p.m. EST	(23–25, 25–12, 25–22, 25–20); Recap			Memorial Coliseum, Lexington, Kentucky

December 3, 2021; 5:30 p.m. EST	Florida State	3–0	Kansas State	Devaney Center, Lincoln, Nebraska
December 3, 2021; 5:30 p.m. EST	(25–20, 25–16, 25–17); Recap			Devaney Center, Lincoln, Nebraska

December 3, 2021; 7:30 p.m. EST	(7) Kentucky	3–0	Southeast Missouri State	Memorial Coliseum, Lexington, Kentucky
December 3, 2021; 7:30 p.m. EST	(25–15, 25–14, 25–19); Recap			Memorial Coliseum, Lexington, Kentucky

December 3, 2021; 7:30 p.m. EST	Mississippi State	2–3	Hawaii	Alaska Airlines Arena, Seattle, Washington
December 3, 2021; 7:30 p.m. EST	(25–17, 14–25, 13–25, 25–21, 11–15); Recap			Alaska Airlines Arena, Seattle, Washington

December 3, 2021; 8:00 p.m. EST	(10) Nebraska	3–0	Campbell	Devaney Center, Lincoln, Nebraska; Attendance: 7,884
December 3, 2021; 8:00 p.m. EST	(25–14, 25–14, 25–17); Recap			Devaney Center, Lincoln, Nebraska; Attendance: 7,884

December 3, 2021; 10:00 p.m. EST	(15) Washington	3–0	Brown	Alaska Airlines Arena, Seattle, Washington; Attendance: 2,973
December 3, 2021; 10:00 p.m. EST	(25–15, 25–13, 25–20); Recap			Alaska Airlines Arena, Seattle, Washington; Attendance: 2,973

==== Second round ====
December 3, 2021; 9:00 p.m. EST	(2) Texas	3–0	Rice	Gregory Gymnasium, Austin, Texas; Attendance: 4,322; Referees: Joe Lizama, Richard Bleau
December 3, 2021; 9:00 p.m. EST	(25–21, 25–23, 25–19); Recap			Gregory Gymnasium, Austin, Texas; Attendance: 4,322; Referees: Joe Lizama, Richard Bleau

December 4, 2021; 5:00 p.m. EST	(7) Kentucky	1–3	Illinois	Memorial Coliseum, Lexington, Kentucky; Attendance: 2,369; Referees: Stephen Shepherd, Mara Wager, Shane White, Phillip Ems
December 4, 2021; 5:00 p.m. EST	(22–25, 25–20, 10–25, 21–25); Recap			Memorial Coliseum, Lexington, Kentucky; Attendance: 2,369; Referees: Stephen Shepherd, Mara Wager, Shane White, Phillip Ems

December 4, 2021; 8:30 p.m. EST	(10) Nebraska	3–0	Florida State	Devaney Center, Lincoln, Nebraska; Attendance: 7,955; Referees: Todd Karolczak, Wade Dubois, Mike Behrens, Ken Corum
December 4, 2021; 8:30 p.m. EST	(25–20, 25–22, 25–17); Recap			Devaney Center, Lincoln, Nebraska; Attendance: 7,955; Referees: Todd Karolczak, Wade Dubois, Mike Behrens, Ken Corum

December 4, 2021; 10:00 p.m. EST	(15) Washington	3–0	Hawaii	Alaska Airlines Arena, Seattle, Washington; Attendance: 3,322; Referees: Paula Martin, Ben Goodwin
December 4, 2021; 10:00 p.m. EST	(25–16, 25–14, 25–13); Recap			Alaska Airlines Arena, Seattle, Washington; Attendance: 3,322; Referees: Paula Martin, Ben Goodwin

==== Regional semifinals ====
December 9, 2021; 7:30 p.m. EST	Illinois	0–3	(10) Nebraska	Gregory Gymnasium, Austin, Texas; Attendance: 4,488
December 9, 2021; 7:30 p.m. EST	(12–25, 21–25, 17–25); Recap			Gregory Gymnasium, Austin, Texas; Attendance: 4,488

December 9, 2021; 9:30 p.m. EST	(15) Washington	2–3	(2) Texas	Gregory Gymnasium, Austin, Texas; Attendance: 4,488
December 9, 2021; 9:30 p.m. EST	(25–19, 25–20, 22–25, 9–25, 9–15); Recap			Gregory Gymnasium, Austin, Texas; Attendance: 4,488

==== Regional final ====
December 11, 2021; 10:00 p.m. EST	(10) Nebraska	3–1	(2) Texas	Gregory Gymnasium, Austin, Texas; Attendance: 5,080
December 11, 2021; 10:00 p.m. EST	(25–19, 25–23, 23–25, 25–21); Recap			Gregory Gymnasium, Austin, Texas; Attendance: 5,080

== Final Four ==
National semifinals Nationwide Arena; December 16
1	Louisville	2
4	Wisconsin	3
3	Pittsburgh	1
10	Nebraska	3

National Championship; Nationwide Arena; December 18
4	Wisconsin	3
10	Nebraska	2

=== National semifinals ===
December 16, 2021; 7:00 p.m. EST	(1) Louisville	2–3	(4) Wisconsin	Nationwide Arena, Columbus, Ohio
December 16, 2021; 7:00 p.m. EST	(23–25, 25–15, 21–25, 25–23, 9–15); Recap			Nationwide Arena, Columbus, Ohio

December 16, 2021; 9:30 p.m. EST	(3) Pittsburgh	1–3	(10) Nebraska	Nationwide Arena, Columbus, Ohio; Attendance: 16,531
December 16, 2021; 9:30 p.m. EST	(25–16, 17–25, 20–25, 22–25); Recap			Nationwide Arena, Columbus, Ohio; Attendance: 16,531

=== National championship ===
December 18, 2021; 7:30 pm EST	(4) Wisconsin	3–2	(10) Nebraska	Nationwide Arena, Columbus, Ohio; Attendance: 18,755; Referees: Pati Rolf, Sergio Gonzalez
December 18, 2021; 7:30 pm EST	(22–25, 31–29, 25–23, 23–25, 15–12); Recap			Nationwide Arena, Columbus, Ohio; Attendance: 18,755; Referees: Pati Rolf, Sergio Gonzalez

=== Final Four All-Tournament Team ===
- Anna Smrek – Most Outstanding Player (Wisconsin)
- Dana Rettke (Wisconsin)
- Sydney Hilley (Wisconsin)
- Nicklin Hames (Nebraska)
- Madi Kubik (Nebraska)
- Anna Debeer (Louisville)
- Leketor Member-Meneh (Pittsburgh)

== Media coverage ==
For the second consecutive season all matches aired on the ESPN Family of networks. Rounds 1 and 2 streamed on ESPN+ with the exception of Texas matches, which were televised by LHN. All Sweet 16 and Elite 8 matches aired on ESPNU or ESPN+. ESPN aired the national semifinals while ESPN2 aired the national championship.

=== Rounds 1 & 2 ===
- Atlanta: Andy Demetra and Kele Eveland
- Austin: Paul Sunderland and Salima Rockwell
- Columbus: Brendan Gulick and Greg Franke (Fri); Luke Maloney and Hanna Williford (Sat)
- Gainesville: Tom Collett
- Lexington: Dick Gabriel and Kathy DeBoer
- Lincoln: Larry Punteney and Kathi Wieskamp
- Louisville: Sean Moth and Patty Dennison Norton
- Los Angeles: Darren Preston
- Madison: Chris Vosters and Liz Tortorello Nelson
- Minneapolis: Johnny Kahner and Meredith Uram
- Omaha: Jake Eisenberg and Shannon Smolinski
- Pittsburgh: Jason Earle and Amanda Silay
- Provo: Jarom Jordan and Amy Gant
- Seattle: Jason Dorow
- Waco: Lincoln Rose, Katie Smith (Thurs), and Adam Johnson (Fri)
- West Lafayette: Cory Palm and Alex Brophy

=== Regional semifinals & Regional Finals ===
- Austin: Paul Sunderland and Salima Rockwell
- Louisville: Eric Frede and Katie George
- Madison: Courtney Lyle and Karch Kiraly
- Pittsburgh: Alex Loeb and Missy Whittemore

=== Semifinals & National Championship ===
- Paul Sunderland, Salima Rockwell, and Christine Williamson

== Records by Conference ==
Conference	Bids	Record	Win %	R32	S16	E8	F4	CM	NC
Big Ten	8	22–7	.759	7	6	4	2	2	1
ACC	6	13–6	.684	5	3	3	2	–	–
Big 12	7	7–7	.500	3	3	1	–	–	–
Pac-12	6	7–6	.538	5	2	–	–	–	–
SEC	6	4–6	.400	3	1	–	–	–	–
West Coast	3	2–3	.400	1	1	–	–	–	–
C-USA	2	2–2	.500	2	–	–	–	–	–
American	1	1–1	.500	1	–	–	–	–	–
Atlantic 10	1	1–1	.500	1	–	–	–	–	–
Atlantic Sun	1	1–1	.500	1	–	–	–	–	–
Big East	2	1–2	.333	1	–	–	–	–	–
Big West	1	1–1	.500	1	–	–	–	–	–
MAC	1	1–1	.500	1	–	–	–	–	–
19 Others	19	0–19	.000	–	–	–	–	–	–

- The R32, S16, E8, F4, CM, and NC columns indicate how many teams from each conference were in the Round of 32 (second round), Round of 16 (third round), quarterfinals (Elite Eight), Semi-finals (Final Four), Championship Match, and National Champion, respectively.
- The following conferences failed to place a team into the round of 32: America East, Big Sky, Big South, Colonial, Horizon, Ivy, MAAC, MEAC, Missouri Valley, Mountain West, Northeast, Ohio Valley, Patriot, Southern, Southland, SWAC, Summit, Sun Belt, and the WAC. The conference's records have been consolidated in the other row.

== NCAA tournament record ==
The following NCAA Tournament records were broken during the 2021 tournament:

- Attendance record, championship match – 18,755
