= Art Chase =

American athletics administrator

Current position
- Title: Athletic director
- Team: The Citadel Bulldogs
- Conference: Southern Conference

Biographical details
- Born: c. 1969
- Education: Guilford (1991)

Administrative career (AD unless noted)
- 1991–1993: The Citadel (ASID)
- 1993–1996: Presbyterian (ASID)
- 1996–2000: The Citadel (SID)
- 2000–2025: Duke (Ext. Affairs)
- 2025–present: The Citadel

Art Chase is an American athletics administrator, currently serving as athletic director of The Citadel Bulldogs in Charleston, South Carolina. He was name to that position in 2025. Chase previously served in sports information and external affairs roles at The Citadel (twice), Presbyterian, and Duke. He is a graduate of Guilford College.
