= NCAA Division I women's volleyball tournament bids by school =

Historical performance record

This is a list of NCAA Women's Division I Volleyball Championship bids by school, as of the conclusion of the 2025 tournament field selection. Schools whose names are italicized are not currently in Division I and cannot be included in the tournament. There are a total of 64 bids possible (32 automatic qualifiers, 32 at-large).

== Bids ==
Bids	School	Conference	Years	Last bid	Win	R-16	QF	SF	CG	Title (#)
45	Penn State	Big Ten	1981–2025	2025	2025	2024	2024	2024	2024	2024 (8)
44	Nebraska	Big Ten	1982–2025	2025	2025	2025	2025	2024	2023	2017 (5)
44	Stanford	Atlantic Coast	1981–2019, 2021–25	2025	2025	2025	2024	2019	2019	2019 (9)
42	Hawaiʻi	Mountain West	1981–91, 1993–2019, 2021–24	2024	2023	2019	2015	2009	1996	1987 (3)
42	Texas	Southeastern	1982–99, 2001–02, 2004–25	2025	2025	2025	2025	2023	2023	2023 (4)
41	USC	Big Ten	1981–85, 1987–89, 1991–2019, 2022–25	2025	2025	2017	2017	2011	2003	2003 (3)
39	UCLA	Big Ten	1981–95, 1997–2012, 2014–17, 2019–21, 2025	2025	2025	2021	2016	2011	2011	2011 (4)
38	BYU	Big 12	1981–89, 1991–2001, 2003, 2005–07, 2012–25	2025	2023	2021	2018	2018	2014	
36	Florida	Southeastern	1987, 1991–2025	2025	2025	2024	2017	2017	2017	
34	Louisville	Atlantic Coast	1982, 1990–96, 1998–2013, 2015, 2017–25	2025	2025	2025	2024	2024	2024	
32	Colorado State	Pac-12	1983–88, 1995–2019, 2024	2024	2017	2014				
30	UC Santa Barbara	Big West	1981–2006, 2009, 2013, 2019, 2023	2023	2019	2002	2000			
30	Arizona	Big 12	1981–89, 1993–94, 1996–2005, 2009–11, 2013–16, 2018, 2025	2025	2025	2016	2005	2001		
30	Minnesota	Big Ten	1989, 1993, 1996–97, 1999–2013, 2015–25	2025	2025	2025	2021	2019	2004	
28	Illinois	Big Ten	1985–95, 1998–99, 2001, 2003–04, 2008–11, 2013–15, 2017–19, 2021, 2024	2024	2021	2021	2018	2018	2011	
28	Washington	Big Ten	1986, 1988–89, 1994, 1996–97, 2002–22, 2024	2024	2021	2021	2020	2020	2005	2005 (1)
29	Wisconsin	Big Ten	1990–91, 1993–94, 1996–2007, 2013–25	2025	2025	2025	2025	2025	2021	2021 (1)
27	Long Beach State	Big West	1985, 1987–2011, 2014	2014	2014	2001	2001	2001	2001	1998 (3)
27	Ohio State	Big Ten	1989, 1990–2002, 2004–06, 2009–12, 2014–16, 2020–22	2022	2022	2022	2022	1994		
27	Pepperdine	West Coast	1981–82, 1984, 1986–91, 1997–2003, 2005–08, 2011–12, 2018, 2020–23	2023	2020	2011	2011			
28	Texas A&M	Southeastern	1981–82, 1985–86, 1993–2005, 2009, 2011–16, 2019, 2023–25	2025	2025	2025	2025	2025	2025	2025 (1)
26	Florida State	Atlantic Coast	1983, 1985, 1987–90, 1992–93, 1997–98, 2002, 2009–19, 2021–24	2024	2021	2016	2011	2011		
27	Kentucky	Southeastern	1983, 1987–88, 1990, 1992–93, 2005–25	2025	2025	2025	2025	2025	2025	2020 (1)
27	Northern Iowa	Missouri Valley	1986–87, 1991, 1994–95, 1998–2003, 2006–12, 2015–19, 2022–25	2025	2025	2002				
27	Purdue	Big Ten	1981–85, 1987, 1990, 2004–08, 2010–13, 2015–25	2025	2025	2025	2025			
27	San Diego	West Coast	1993, 1996–99, 2001–08, 2010–22, 2025	2025	2022	2022	2022	2022		
24	Pacific	West Coast	1981–2004	2004	2003	2001	1999	1999	1990	1986 (2)
22	Arizona State	Big 12	1981–83, 1985–88, 1992–95, 1999–2000, 2002, 2006, 2012–15, 2023–25	2025	2025	2025				
22	Colorado	Big 12	1989, 1991–2001, 2003–06, 2013–14, 2017–18, 2022, 2025	2025	2025	2017				
21	Notre Dame	Atlantic Coast	1988, 1992–2006, 2009, 2012, 2017, 2019–20	2020	2020	2002	2000			
21	Oregon	Big Ten	1984, 1986–87, 1989, 2006–09, 2011–18, 2020–24	2024	2024	2024	2023	2012	2012	
20	Duke	Atlantic Coast	1984–86, 1991–94, 2000–02, 2005–11, 2013–14, 2018	2018	2013	2010	2010			
21	Michigan	Big Ten	1997, 1999–2000, 2002–04, 2006–13, 2015–19, 2021, 2025	2025	2025	2018	2012	2012		
20	Michigan State	Big Ten	1994–2003, 2006–07, 2009, 2011–17	2017	2017	2017	2017	1995		
21	North Carolina	Atlantic Coast	1982–83, 1988–89, 1998–2002, 2005, 2008, 2010–16, 2021, 2024–25	2025	2025	2016	2014			
21	Pittsburgh	Atlantic Coast	1982, 1984, 1986–87, 1990–94, 2003–04, 2016–25	2025	2025	2025	2025	2025		
19	Missouri	Southeastern	2000–07, 2010–11, 2013, 2015–20, 2023–24	2024	2024	2024	2005			
20	Tennessee	Southeastern	1981–84, 1993, 2000, 2004–06, 2008–12, 2018, 2021–25	2025	2023	2023	2005	2005		
20	Utah	Big 12	1998–2006, 2008, 2013–14, 2016–21, 2024–25	2025	2024	2019				
19	American	Patriot	1997–98, 2001–08, 2010–11, 2013–17, 2019, 2025	2025	2015	2013				
18	Dayton	Atlantic 10	2003–05, 2007–12, 2014–16, 2018–21, 2023–24	2024	2024	2024				
19	Kansas State	Big 12	1996–2005, 2007–08, 2011–12, 2014–16, 2021, 2025	2025	2025	2011				
18	Washington State	Pac-12	1991, 1993–97, 2000–02, 2009, 2016–23	2023	2023	2023	2002			
17	California	Atlantic Coast	1982–83, 1987–89, 2002–13	2013	2013	2010	2010	2010	2010	
18	Cal Poly	Big West	1981–89, 1999–2000, 2002, 2006–07, 2017–19, 2025	2025	2025	2025	1985			
17	Illinois State	Missouri Valley	1982–85, 1988–89, 1992–93, 1996–98, 2007, 2014, 2018–21	2021	2014	1992				
18	Iowa State	Big 12	1995, 2006–17, 2019, 2021–23, 2025	2025	2025	2012	2011			
18	Western Kentucky	Conference USA	2002, 2005, 2007–08, 2010–12, 2014–17, 2019–25	2025	2023	2020				
16	Loyola Marymount	West Coast	1986, 1994–97, 1999–2000, 2003–05, 2012, 2014–15, 2018, 2022, 2024	2024	2024	2015				
16	LSU	Southeastern	1986–87, 1989–92, 2005–10, 2013–14, 2017, 2022	2022	2022	1992	1991	1991		
16	Santa Clara	West Coast	1992–93, 1998–2008, 2012, 2014–15	2015	2008	2005	2005	2005		
15	Creighton	Big East	2010, 2012–25	2025	2025	2025	2025			
15	Fairfield	Metro	1997-2001, 2012–13, 2015–17, 2019, 2021, 2023–25	2025						
15	Georgia Tech	Atlantic Coast	1994–96, 2000–04, 2009, 2020–25	2025	2024	2023	2021			
14	San Diego State	Pac-12	1981–86, 1988–90, 1994–96, 2001, 2012	2012	1996	1995	1983	1982		
14	Texas State	Pac-12	1986, 1991, 1998, 2004–05, 2007, 2009, 2011, 2013, 2018–20, 2023–24	2024	2020					
14	Western Michigan	Mid-American	1982–89, 2000, 2008, 2011, 2014, 2023–24	2024	2023	2008	1983			
13	Arkansas	Southeastern	1996–99, 2001, 2003–06, 2012–13, 2022–2023	2023	2023	2023	2023			
14	Baylor	Big 12	1999, 2001, 2009, 2011, 2016–25	2025	2025	2022	2019	2019		
13	Cincinnati	Big 12	1981, 1999–2003, 2008–11, 2016, 2018–19	2019	2019	2019				
14	Florida A&M	SWAC	1999, 2001–09, 2021–22, 2024-25	2025	2003					
13	Houston	Big 12	1989, 1991–2000, 2022–23	2023	2023	2022	1994			
14	Kansas	Big 12	2003–05, 2012–17, 2021–25	2025	2025	2025	2015	2015		
14	LIU Brooklyn	Northeast	2004–09, 2012–14, 2016–17, 2020, 2023, 2025	2025	2005					
14	Marquette	Big East	2011–19, 2021–25	2025	2025	2024				
14	Miami (FL)	Atlantic Coast	2002, 2009–15, 2017, 2021–25	2025	2025	2002				
13	Missouri State	Conference USA	1982, 1990, 1993, 2003, 2005–08, 2010–11, 2015–17	2017	2006					
13	Oklahoma	Southeastern	1987–88, 1997, 2006–07, 2009–14, 2019, 2024	2024	2024	2010	1988			
13	UCF	Big 12	1994–97, 2001–03, 2014, 2018–22	2022	2022					
12	Georgia	Southeastern	1985–86, 1991–95, 2004, 2013, 2019, 2022–23	2023	2022	1993				
12	San Jose State	Mountain West	1982–90, 1998, 2000–01	2001	2001	1986	1984	1984		
12	Wichita State	American	2004, 2007–13, 2015–17, 2024	2024	2017	2012				
11	Ball State	Mid-American	1992–95, 1999–2000, 2002, 2011, 2019, 2021–22	2022	2021					
11	Sacramento State	Big West	1997–2000, 2002–07, 2024	2024	2007					
11	South Carolina	Southeastern	1984, 1995, 1997–98, 2000–02, 2018–19, 2021, 2024	2024	2019					
10	Alabama A&M	SWAC	2000–05, 2007–10	2010						
10	College of Charleston	Coastal	2002, 2004–07, 2009, 2012–13, 2017, 2024	2024	2012					
10	Miami (OH)	Mid-American	1981, 1990, 1995–98, 2007–08, 2016–17	2017	1998					
10	Milwaukee	Horizon	1998–2002, 2006, 2008–09, 2011, 2013	2013						
10	New Mexico State	Conference USA	2003–04, 2006–08, 2012–13, 2015, 2018–19	2019	2008					
10	Ohio	Mid-American	2003–10, 2013, 2015	2015	2010	2005				
10	Yale	Ivy League	2004, 2008, 2011–14, 2018, 2022–24	2024	2008					
9	Hofstra	Coastal	1995–97, 1999–2000, 2006, 2012, 2014, 2018	2018	2006					
9	New Mexico	Mountain West	1981, 1988, 1990–94, 2009–10	2010	1994	1991				
9	Oral Roberts	Summit	1995–2002, 2006	2006	1997	1995	1995			
9	Texas-Arlington	United Athletic	1985-90, 2001–02, 2024	2024	1989	1989	1989	1989		
9	Texas Tech	Big 12	1990–92, 1995–96, 1998, 2000–01, 2021	2021	1995	1991				
8	Clemson	Atlantic Coast	1993-94, 1997–99, 2007–09	2009	2008					
8	Coastal Carolina	Sun Belt	1996, 1998, 2009, 2014–17, 2023	2023	2016					
9	High Point	Big South	2010, 2016–18, 2020, 2022-25	2025	2020					
8	Lipscomb	Atlantic Sun	2007, 2009–11, 2014–16, 2020	2020						
8	New Hampshire	America East	1998, 2002–03, 2013–16, 2024	2024						
8	Northwestern	Big Ten	1981-84, 2002–03, 2005, 2010	2010	2010	1981				
9	Princeton	Ivy League	1994, 1997, 1999–2000, 2007, 2016–17, 2019, 2025	2025						
9	Rice	American	2004, 2008–09, 2018–22, 2025	2025	2022					
9	Stephen F. Austin	Southland	1994, 1997, 1999, 2006, 2018–19, 2022–23, 2025	2025	2006					
7	Albany	America East	2004, 2006–08, 2010–11, 2019	2019	2007					
7	Colgate	Patriot	1996, 1999, 2012, 2021–24	2024						
7	George Mason	Atlantic 10	1993–96, 2002–03, 2009	2009	1996					
7	Liberty	Conference USA	1997, 1999, 2001, 2007–08, 2011–12	2012						
8	Loyola Chicago	Atlantic 10	1995, 1999–2000, 2004–05, 2022, 2024-25	2025	2024					
7	Maryland	Big Ten	1990, 1995–97, 2003–05	2005	2005					
7	Middle Tennessee	Conference USA	1995, 2006–11	2011	2008	2007				
8	Northern Colorado	Big Sky	2009, 2011–12, 2014, 2019, 2021–22, 2025	2025						
7	Northern Illinois	Horizon	1993, 1996–98, 2001, 2011, 2016	2016	1998					
7	Saint Mary's (CA)	West Coast	2003–05, 2008–09, 2012, 2018	2018	2012	2004				
7	Samford	Southern	2011, 2014, 2016, 2018–22	2022						
8	South Florida	American	1993, 1995–98, 2000, 2002, 2025	2025	2002					
6	Alabama State	SWAC	2013–14, 2016–19	2019						
6	Cleveland State	Horizon	2007, 2012, 2015–17, 2024	2024						
6	Denver	West Coast	2014–19	2019						
6	Howard	MEAC	2015–19, 2021	2021						
6	Idaho	Big Sky	1992–95, 2003–04	2004	1994					
6	James Madison	Sun Belt	1999–2000, 2016–17, 2022–23	2023						
6	Robert Morris	Horizon	1999–2003, 2015	2015						
6	Siena	Metro	1995, 2005–08, 2014	2014						
6	Southeast Missouri State	Ohio Valley	1996, 1998–2000, 2019, 2021	2021	2000					
7	TCU	Big 12	2009, 2015–16, 2022–25	2025	2025					
7	Utah State	Pac-12	2000–01, 2005, 2010, 2022–23, 2025	2025	2025					
6	Winthrop	Big South	2002–06, 2019	2019						
5	Alabama	Southeastern	2005–07, 2013–14	2014	2014					
6	Arkansas State	Sun Belt	1992, 1994–95, 1999, 2015, 2025	2025						
5	Little Rock	United Athletic	1996–98, 2000, 2014	2014	2014					
5	Cal State Northridge	Big West	1992, 1996, 2003–04, 2013	2013	2013					
5	Delaware	Conference USA	2007–08, 2010–11, 2023	2023	2011					
5	FGCU	Atlantic Sun	2018, 2021–24	2024	2021					
5	Fresno State	Pac-12	1984, 1991, 1998, 2002, 2023	2023	1984	1984	1984			
6	Indiana	Big Ten	1995, 1998–99, 2002, 2010, 2025	2025	2025	2025				
5	Jackson State	SWAC	2011–12, 2015, 2020, 2023	2023						
5	Nevada	Mountain West	1998, 2001–02, 2004–05	2005						
5	Ole Miss	Southeastern	2006–07, 2010, 2021, 2024	2024	2024					
5	Penn	Ivy League	2001–03, 2009–10	2010	2009					
5	South Dakota	Summit	2018, 2020–22, 2024	2024						
5	Texas A&M-Corpus Christi	Southland	2015–16, 2020–21, 2024	2024						
5	Towson	Coastal	2004, 2019–22	2022	2019					
6	UMBC	America East	1998, 2020–23, 2025	2025						
4	Belmont	Missouri Valley	2006, 2008, 2012, 2015	2015						
4	Bowling Green	Mid-American	1991, 2012, 2020, 2022	2022	2012					
4	Eastern Washington	Big Sky	1989, 1998–99, 2001	2001	2001					
4	George Washington	Atlantic 10	1993–95, 2000	2000	1995					
4	Georgia Southern	Sun Belt	2001, 2003, 2010, 2013	2013						
4	Idaho State	Big Sky	1986–87, 1990, 2013	2013						
4	Lamar	Southland	1983–84, 1993, 2008	2008						
4	Morehead State	Ohio Valley	2011, 2013, 2020, 2024	2024	2020					
4	Murray State	Missouri Valley	2003, 2014, 2016, 2018	2018						
4	NC State	Atlantic Coast	1987, 2012, 2017, 2024	2024	2017					
4	Oregon State	Pac-12	1983, 2001, 2014, 2017	2017	2014	2014				
4	Radford	Big South	1993, 2000, 2013, 2017	2017						
4	Sacred Heart	Metro	2010–11, 2019, 2021	2021						
5	SMU	Atlantic Coast	2015–16, 2023–25	2025	2025	2025				
4	Temple	American	1997–99, 2002	2002	2002	2002				
5	Tulsa	American	2007, 2010–12, 2025	2025	2011					
4	UNLV	Mountain West	2007, 2016, 2020–22	2022	2020					
5	Wright State	Horizon	2019, 2020, 2022–23, 2025	2025	2020					
4	Wyoming	Mountain West	1986, 1989–90, 1994	1994	1989	1989	1989			
3	Auburn	Southeastern	2010, 2022–23	2023	2022					
3	Binghamton	America East	2005, 2009, 2012	2012						
3	Brown	Ivy League	1996, 1998, 2021	2021						
4	Central Arkansas	United Athletic	2012–13, 2017, 2025	2025						
3	Cornell	Ivy League	1993, 2005–06	2006						
3	East Tennessee State	Southern	2012, 2017–18	2018						
3	FIU	Conference USA	2001, 2008–09	2009	2009					
3	Florida Atlantic	American	1998–99, 2005	2005						
3	Jacksonville	Atlantic Sun	2004, 2013–14	2014						
3	Jacksonville State	Conference USA	2005–06, 2009	2009	2009					
3	Montana	Big Sky	1990–91, 1994	1994	1994					
3	Morgan State	MEAC	1997–98, 2000	2000						
3	Niagara	Metro	2009–11	2011						
3	North Dakota State	Summit	2008, 2010–11	2011						
3	Northern Arizona	Big Sky	1999, 2015, 2018	2018						
3	Rhode Island	Atlantic 10	1985, 1991, 1996	1996						
3	Saint Louis	Atlantic 10	2006, 2008–09	2009	2008					
3	St. John's	Big East	2006–07, 2019	2019	2007	2007				
3	UC Irvine	Big West	1988, 2003–04	2004	2003					
3	UTSA	American	2000, 2010, 2013	2013						
3	Weber State	Big Sky	1988, 2020, 2023	2023	2020					
3	Valparaiso	Missouri Valley	2003–05	2005						
3	VCU	Atlantic 10	2005, 2017, 2019	2019						
2	Army	Patriot	2009, 2020	2020						
2	Appalachian State	Sun Belt	1993–94	1994						
2	Austin Peay	United Athletic	2010, 2017	2017						
2	Boise State	Pac-12	2016, 2021	2021	2016					
2	Bucknell	Patriot	1998, 2000	2000						
2	Butler	Big East	1997, 2010	2010						
2	Cal State Bakersfield	Big West	2014, 2017	2017						
2	Chattanooga	Southern	1997–98	1998						
2	Davidson	Atlantic 10	1999-2000	2000						
2	Delaware State	MEAC	2022, 2024	2024						
2	DePaul	Big East	1993, 2001	2001						
3	Eastern Illinois	Ohio Valley	2001, 2023, 2025	2025						
2	Eastern Kentucky	United Athletic	1984, 2004	2004						
2	Purdue Fort Wayne	Horizon	2009, 2012	2012						
2	Furman	Southern	2008, 2015	2015						
2	Georgetown	Big East	1998–99	1999						
2	Green Bay	Horizon	2003, 2018	2018						
2	Hampton	Coastal	2013–14	2014						
2	Iona	Metro	2004, 2018	2018						
2	Iowa	Big Ten	1989, 1994	1994						
2	Kennesaw State	Conference USA	2017, 2019	2019						
2	Manhattan	Metro	2002–03	2003						
2	Marshall	Sun Belt	1995, 2005	2005						
2	UMES	MEAC	2011–12	2012						
2	North Dakota	Summit	2016–17	2017						
2	Portland State	Big Sky	2008, 2010	2010						
2	Prairie View A&M	SWAC	1999, 2006	2006						
2	Providence	Big East	1983, 1985	1985						
2	Rider	Metro	1994, 2020	2020						
2	Sam Houston	Conference USA	1993, 1996	1996						
2	San Francisco	West Coast	2003, 2008	2008						
2	South Alabama	Sun Belt	2021, 2023	2023						
3	South Dakota State	Summit	2007, 2024-25	2025						
2	Southeastern Louisiana	Southland	2022–23	2023						
2	Stony Brook	Coastal	2017–18	2018						
2	Tennessee State	Ohio Valley	2007, 2022	2022						
2	Tennessee Tech	Southern	1997, 2008	2008						
2	Tulane	American	2008–09	2009	2008					
2	UAB	American	2006, 2008	2008	2008					
3	Utah Valley	Big West	2020–21, 2025	2025						
2	Villanova	Big East	1997, 2015	2015						
2	Virginia	Atlantic Coast	1998-99	1999						
3	Wofford	Southern	2023–25	2025						
3	Xavier	Big East	2001, 2007, 2025	2025						
1	Alliant	Independent	1986	1986						
1	Bryant	America East	2018	2018						
1	Cal State Fullerton	Big West	2010	2010						
2	Campbell	Coastal	2021, 2025	2025						
1	Central Michigan	Mid-American	2011	2011						
1	Chicago State	Northeast	2024	2024						
2	Coppin State	MEAC	2023, 2025	2025						
1	Duquesne	Atlantic 10	2013	2013						
1	Eastern Michigan	Mid-American	2018	2018						
1	Fairleigh Dickinson	Northeast	2022	2022						
1	Georgia State	Sun Belt	2000	2000						
1	Gonzaga	Pac-12	1990	1990						
1	Grand Canyon	Mountain West	2023	2023						
1	Harvard	Ivy League	2015	2015						
1	IU Indy	Horizon	2013	2013						
1	Lehigh	Patriot	1997	1997						
1	Memphis	American	1994	1994						
1	Mississippi State	Southeastern	2021	2021						
1	Navy	Patriot	2018	2018						
1	Nicholls	Southland	2003	2003						
1	North Carolina A&T	Coastal	2020	2020	2020					
1	North Texas	American	1995	1995						
1	Northeastern	Coastal	2001	2001						
1	Northern Kentucky	Horizon	2019	2019						
1	Northwestern State	Southland	2014	2014						
1	Oakland	Horizon	2014	2014						
1	Omaha	Summit	2023	2023						
1	Quinnipiac	Metro	2022	2022						
1	Rutgers	Big Ten	1982	1982						
1	Seton Hall	Big East	2014	2014						
1	South Carolina State	MEAC	2010	2010						
1	Southern	SWAC	1998	1998						
1	Southern Illinois	Missouri Valley	2015	2015						
1	St. Thomas (MN)	Summit	2025	2025						
1	Syracuse	Atlantic Coast	2018	2018						
1	Tennessee-Martin	Ohio Valley	2002	2002						
1	The Citadel	Southern	2021	2021						
1	Toledo	Mid-American	2025	2025						
1	UIC	Missouri Valley	2021	2021						
1	UNC Wilmington	Coastal	2015	2015						
2	UTEP	Mountain West	2024-25	2025						
1	UTRGV	Southland	2016	2016						
1	Virginia Tech	Atlantic Coast	2010	2010	2010					
1	West Virginia	Big 12	2021	2021						
1	William & Mary	Coastal	2001	2001						
