= Mick Haley =

American volleyball coach (born 1943)

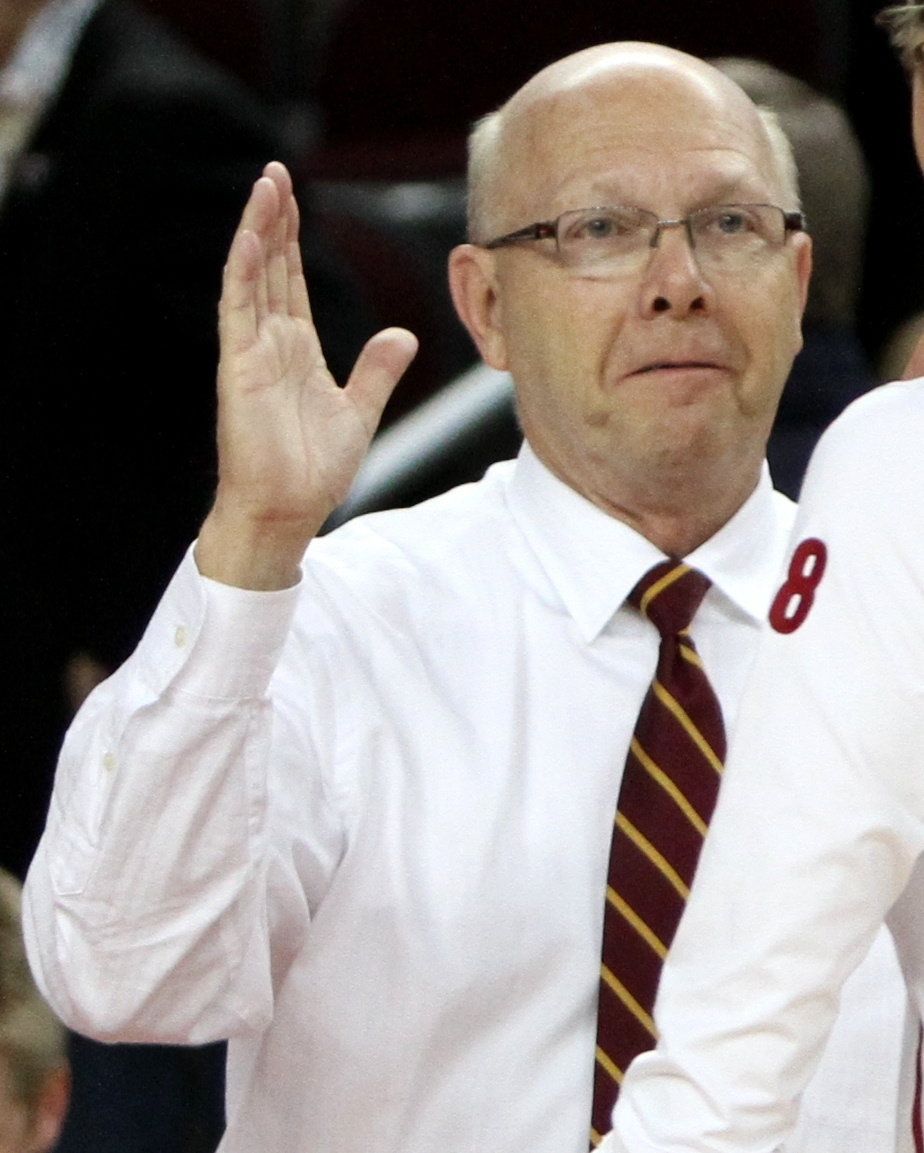

Personal information
- Born: August 18, 1943 (age 83)
- Hometown: Angola, Indiana U.S.
- Education: Ball State; Southern Illinois

Coaching information
- Current team: None
Previous teams coached
Years	Teams
1973–1979; 1980–1996; 1997–2000; 2001–2017	Kellogg Community College; University of Texas; U.S.A. Women's National Team; Southern California

Best results
Years
1982
1983
1984
1985
1986
1987
1988
1989
1990
1991
1992
1993
1994
1995
2002
2003
2004
2007
2010
Location
Southwest Conference Championship
Southwest Conference Championship
Southwest Conference Championship
Southwest Conference Championship
Southwest Conference Championship
Southwest Conference Championship
NCAA national championship
Southwest Conference Championship
Southwest Conference Championship
Southwest Conference Championship
Southwest Conference Championship
Southwest Conference Championship
Southwest Conference Championship
Southwest Conference Championship
NCAA national championship
Southwest Conference Championship
NCAA national championship
Pac-10 Championship
NCAA national championship
Pac-10 Championship
NCAA national championship
NCAA national championship
NCAA national championship
Result
1st
1st
1st
1st
1st
1st
1st
1st
1st
1st
1st
1st
1st
1st
2nd
1st
1st
1st
1st
1st
3rd
3rd
3rd
- Last updated: July 22, 2011

Mick Haley (born August 18, 1943) is an American volleyball coach. He previously served for 17 seasons as the head coach of the University of Southern California women's volleyball team. He has also coached the U.S. Women's National Team at the Olympics. Prior to this he served for 17 years as the head coach of the University of Texas women's volleyball team.

== Early life ==
Haley was a setter at Ball State under legendary coach Don Shondell and helped the Cardinals to the 1964 and 1965 MIVA title. Haley was inducted into the Ball State Athletic Hall of Fame in 1984. He earned his bachelor's degree in education from Ball State in 1965. Haley earned a master's degree in education from Southern Illinois University in 1966.

== Head coaching history ==
=== 1973–1979: Kellogg CC ===
Haley coached at Kellogg Community College in Battle Creek, Michigan, for seven seasons (1973–79). He first served as an instructor and intramural director, then took the helm of the men's and women's varsity teams in 1973, going 251–51 overall and leading his women's team to the national junior college title in 1978 and 1979. He also coached the Kellogg men to four national crowns during that time. In his last season there, the men's team, the only jr. college in the conference, won the MIVA, beating Ohio St. in the finals 3–0. In 1997, he was inducted into the Junior College Coaches Hall of Fame.

=== 1980–1996: Texas ===
Haley was the head coach for the Texas Longhorns volleyball team. Under his tutelage, the Longhorns were the AIAW champions in 1981 and the NCAA champions in 1988. They also reached the NCAA Final Four in 1986, 1987, and 1995. The Longhorns won the Southwest Conference title every year except for 1994, before switching to the Big 12 his final year, where they finished second.

At Texas, he carried an overall record of 522–137–1, including a 150–10 conference record.

=== 1997–2000: Olympic coaching ===
Haley temporarily left collegiate coaching in order to coach the women's U.S. National Team for the 2000 Sydney Olympics, where the team fell short of the Bronze Medal to finish in fourth place.

=== 2001–2017: USC ===
Haley returned to collegiate coaching, but instead of returning to Texas, he took over for USC where it did not take long for the Women of Troy to reach national prominence.

Just in his second year, Haley led the top-seeded Trojans to the program's second NCAA championship – and first since 1981 – by defeating Stanford University in the final, 3–1, avenging their only loss of the season to the Cardinal. With the win, Haley became just the second head coach in NCAA history to win a national championship at two universities.

In 2003, the team went undefeated in the regular season. The Trojans reached the championship match and defeated Florida, 3–1. The 2003 squad became the first repeat NCAA champion in six years and was the first repeat champion in NCAA history to go undefeated. April Ross was the Honda Award winner, while the 2003 team comprised four All-Americans, including three on the first team.

Since 2003, the Trojans have not won a Pac-10 or NCAA championship, but have reached the final four in 2004 (including upsetting top seeded Nebraska in the regional final), in 2007, where they were one point away from defeating top-seeded Stanford in the national semifinals and in 2010 (upsetting Stanford in the regional final).

Despite finishing the 2017 season with a 25–10 record and ranked 14th nationally, USC announced on Dec. 16, 2017 that Haley would not be returning for the 2018 season, ending his 17-year career at the school. Haley subsequently retained legal counsel to pursue an age discrimination complaint against USC. Donna Heinel, former associate athletic director in charge of women's sports, has been indicted for accepting $1.3 million in bribes to accept non athletes as athletes. She allegedly tried to cut the slots on the roster of the women's volleyball by one in order to sell the slot and when Mick refused dismissed him at the end of the season and told him his time had come and gone (too old). Despite the admissions scandal at USC costing Mick Haley his position, he has indicated an interest in continuing his coaching career at another school. Haley and USC reached a confidential settlement in December 2023.

== Head coaching record ==
Record table
Season	Team	Overall	Conference	Standing	Postseason
Texas (TAIAW) (1980–1981)
1980	Texas	40–16		3rd	
1981	Texas	60–6		1st	AIAW Champions
Texas (Southwest Conference) (1982–1995)
1982	Texas	31–15	9–1	1st	NCAA Regional semifinal
1983	Texas	33–9	10–0	1st	NCAA Regional semifinal
1984	Texas	32–7	9–1	1st	NCAA Regional final
1985	Texas	26–6	10–0	1st	NCAA Regional final
1986	Texas	29–6	10–0	1st	NCAA Final Four
1987	Texas	25–10	10–0	1st	NCAA Final Four
1988	Texas	34–5	10–0	1st	NCAA Champions
1989	Texas	27–10	10–0	1st	NCAA Regional final
1990	Texas	31–4	10–0	1st	NCAA Regional final
1991	Texas	20–10	9–1	1st	NCAA Regional semifinal
1992	Texas	29–6	9–1	1st	NCAA Regional final
1993	Texas	31–3	10–0	1st	NCAA Regional final
1994	Texas	23–10	8–2	2nd	NCAA Second Round
1995	Texas	28–7	10–0	1st	NCAA runner-up
Texas (Big 12) (1996)
1996	Texas	23–7	16–4	2nd	NCAA Regional semifinal
Texas:		522–137	SWC: 134–6; Big 12: 16–4		
USC (Pac 10/12) (2001–2017)
2001	USC	25–4	16–2	2nd	NCAA Regional final
2002	USC	31–1	17–1	1st	NCAA Champion
2003	USC	35–0	18–0	1st	NCAA Champion
2004	USC	23–6	14–4	3rd	NCAA Semifinal
2005	USC	17–11	12–6	4th	NCAA Regional final
2006	USC	27–5	14–4	4th	NCAA Regional semifinal
2007	USC	29–5	14–4	3rd	NCAA Semifinal
2008	USC	17–12	9–9	T-5th	NCAA 2nd Round
2009	USC	22–10	10–8	5th	NCAA 2nd Round
2010	USC	29–5	14–4	3rd	NCAA Semifinal
2011	USC	29–5	20–2	1st	NCAA Semifinal
2012	USC	30–6	15–5	3rd	NCAA Regional final
2013	USC	29–6	16–4	3rd	NCAA Regional final
2014	USC	16–16	10–10	10th	NCAA 2nd Round
2015	USC	33–3	18–2	T-1st	NCAA Regional final
2016	USC	18–14	10–10	T-7th	NCAA 1st Round
2017	USC	25–10	14–6	T-2nd	NCAA Regional final
USC:		435–119	119–138		
Total:		957–256			
National champion Postseason invitational champion Conference regular season champion Conference regular season and conference tournament champion Division regular season champion Division regular season and conference tournament champion Conference tournament champion

== Awards and honors ==
- 2003: AVCA National Coach of the Year, AVCA Pacific Region Coach of the Year, Texas Athletic Hall of Fame induction
- 1997: NJCAA Volleyball Coaches Association Hall of Fame
- 1984: Ball State University Athletic Hall of Fame

== See also ==
- List of college women's volleyball coaches with 700 wins
