= 2007 NCAA Division I women's volleyball tournament =

Volleyball competition

2007 NCAA women's Division I volleyball tournament
- 2007 NCAA Final Four logo
- Champions: Penn State (2nd title)
- Runner-up: Stanford (13th title match)
- Semifinalists: Southern California (8th Final Four); California (1st Final Four)
- Winning coach: Russ Rose (2nd title)
- Most outstanding player: Megan Hodge (Penn State)
- Final Four All-Tournament Team: Christa Harmotto (Penn State); Nicole Fawcett (Penn State); Alisha Glass (Penn State); Foluke Akinradewo (Stanford); Alix Klineman (Stanford); Asia Kaczor (Southern California)

The 2007 NCAA Division I women's volleyball tournament began on November 29, 2007, with 64 teams and concluded on December 15, 2007, when Penn State defeated Stanford 3 games to 2 in Sacramento, California for the program's second NCAA title.

Penn State, who was making their first final four appearance since 1999, finished the season on a 26 match win streak. Their last loss of 2007 came against Stanford in five games. Semifinalist California made the program's first NCAA Final Four appearance after upsetting defending champion Nebraska in the quarterfinals.

With Stanford, California and Southern California making the Final Four, it became the second straight year that the Final Four consisted of three Pac-10 teams. However, for the second straight year, it was the team from the different conference that won the national championship.

== Records ==
Stanford Regional
| Seed | School | Conference | Berth Type | Record |
|---|---|---|---|---|
| | Alabama | SEC | At-large | 15-14 |
| | Alabama A&M | SWAC | Automatic | 15-9 |
| 16 | Cal Poly | Big West | Automatic | 21-7 |
| | Clemson | ACC | Automatic | 28-3 |
| 9 | Kansas State | Big 12 | At-large | 22-8 |
| | Minnesota | Big Ten | At-large | 18-12 |
| | Missouri State | Missouri Valley | At-large | 25-7 |
| | Ohio | MAC | At-large | 26-5 |
| | Oregon | Pac-10 | At-large | 20-10 |
| | Purdue | Big Ten | At-large | 18-13 |
| | Sacramento State | Big Sky | Automatic | 28-7 |
| | Santa Clara | West Coast | At-large | 19-11 |
| 1 | Stanford | Pac-10 | Automatic | 27-2 |
| | Tulsa | Conference USA | Automatic | 27-8 |
| 8 | UCLA | Pac-10 | At-large | 20-10 |
| | Xavier | Atlantic 10 | At-large | 24-10 |

University Park Regional
| Seed | School | Conference | Berth Type | Record |
|---|---|---|---|---|
| | Albany | America East | Automatic | 23-9 |
| | BYU | Mountain West | At-large | 21-7 |
| | Cleveland State | Horizon | Automatic | 23-8 |
| 14 | Colorado State | Mountain West | At-large | 22-7 |
| 11 | Hawaiʻi | WAC | Automatic | 26-5 |
| | Illinois State | Missouri Valley | At-large | 21-11 |
| | Louisville | Big East | At-large | 22-7 |
| | Miami (OH) | MAC | Automatic | 20-10 |
| | Michigan | Big Ten | At-large | 22-10 |
| | Middle Tennessee | Sun Belt | Automatic | 33-2 |
| | Mississippi | SEC | At-large | 25-7 |
| | Missouri | Big 12 | At-large | 17-12 |
| 3 | Penn State | Big Ten | Automatic | 28-2 |
| | Siena | MAAC | Automatic | 24-7 |
| | Tennessee State | Ohio Valley | Automatic | 20-13 |
| 6 | Washington | Pac-10 | At-large | 26-3 |

Gainesville Regional
| Seed | School | Conference | Berth Type | Record |
|---|---|---|---|---|
| | College of Charleston | Southern | Automatic | 26-7 |
| | Delaware | Colonial | Automatic | 30-4 |
| 13 | Florida | SEC | Automatic | 27-2 |
| | Florida A&M | MEAC | Automatic | 18-7 |
| | Long Beach State | Big West | At-large | 25-6 |
| | Long Island | Northeast | Automatic | 23-13 |
| | LSU | SEC | At-large | 24-7 |
| | New Mexico State | WAC | At-large | 26-5 |
| | Oklahoma | Big 12 | At-large | 21-9 |
| | Pepperdine | West Coast | At-large | 18-10 |
| | Princeton | Ivy League | Automatic | 22-3 |
| 12 | St. John's (NY) | Big East | Automatic | 31-3 |
| 4 | Texas | Big 12 | Auto (shared) | 24-3 |
| | Texas State | Southland | Automatic | 21-11 |
| | UNLV | Mountain West | Automatic | 24-5 |
| 5 | USC | Pac-10 | At-large | 25-4 |

Madison Regional
| Seed | School | Conference | Berth Type | Record |
|---|---|---|---|---|
| | American | Patriot | Automatic | 26-7 |
| 10 | California | Pac-10 | At-large | 22-7 |
| 15 | Dayton | Atlantic 10 | Automatic | 32-1 |
| | Duke | ACC | At-large | 24-6 |
| | Iowa State | Big 12 | At-large | 17-13 |
| | Kentucky | SEC | At-large | 22-9 |
| | Liberty | Big South | Automatic | 27-8 |
| | Lipscomb | Atlantic Sun | Automatic | 20-11 |
| | Michigan State | Big Ten | At-large | 19-13 |
| 2 | Nebraska | Big 12 | Auto (shared) | 27-1 |
| | Northern Iowa | Missouri Valley | Automatic | 22-10 |
| | San Diego | West Coast | Automatic | 21-7 |
| | South Dakota State | Summit | Automatic | 25-10 |
| | Western Kentucky | Sun Belt | At-large | 27-8 |
| | Wichita State | Missouri Valley | At-large | 26-5 |
| 7 | Wisconsin | Big Ten | At-large | 25-4 |

== Stanford Regional ==
First round November 29–30
1 | Stanford | 3
Santa Clara | 0
Stanford, CA
Sacramento State | 3
Minnesota | 1
Purdue | 3
Ohio | 1
Athens, OH
Xavier | 0
16 | Cal Poly | 3
9 | Kansas State | 3
Tulsa | 0
Manhattan, KS
Oregon | 3
Missouri State | 0
Alabama | 1
Clemson | 3
Clemson, SC
Alabama A&M | 0
8 | UCLA | 3

Second round November 30-December 1
1 | Stanford | 3
Sacramento State | 0
Purdue | 0
16 | Cal Poly | 3
9 | Kansas State | 2
Oregon | 3
Clemson | 1
8 | UCLA | 3

Regional semifinals December 7
1 | Stanford | 3
16 | Cal Poly | 0
Oregon | 1
8 | UCLA | 3

Regional finals December 8
1 | Stanford | 3
8 | UCLA | 1

=== Recap ===
There were generally no major upsets in this bracket region. Overall #1 seed Stanford advanced to the final four for the second straight year with a 3–1 victory over Pac-10 foe UCLA.

Stanford Regional All-Tournament Team:

- Foluke Akinradewo (MVP) - Stanford
- Bryn Kehoe - Stanford
- Alix Klineman - Stanford
- Erin Waller - Stanford
- Kaitlin Sather - UCLA
- Nellie Spicer - UCLA
- Rachell Johnson - UCLA

== Gainesville Regional ==
First round November 29–30
5 | USC | 3
Pepperdine | 0
Los Angeles, CA
Long Beach State | 3
UNLV | 2
Princeton | 1
Delaware | 3
Queens, NY
Long Island | 0
12 | St. John's (NY) | 3
13 | Florida | 3
College of Charleston | 0
Gainesville, FL
Florida A&M | 1
Oklahoma | 3
New Mexico State | 2
LSU | 3
Austin, TX
Texas State | 0
4 | Texas | 3

Second round November 30-December 1
5 | Southern California | 3
Long Beach State | 2
Delaware | 1
12 | St. John's (NY) | 3
13 | Florida | 3
Oklahoma | 0
LSU | 0
4 | Texas | 3

Regional semifinals December 7
5 | Southern California | 3
12 | St. John's (NY) | 2
13 | Florida | 1
4 | Texas | 3

Regional finals December 8
5 | Southern California | 3
4 | Texas | 0

=== Recap ===
The biggest upset in the Gainesville bracket was #5 seed USC surprisingly sweeping #4 seed Texas, ending Texas' 24 match win streak.

Gainesville Regional All-Tournament Team:

- Asia Kaczor (MVP) - Southern California
- Diane Copenhagen - Southern California
- Jessica Gysin - Southern California
- Michelle Moriarty - Texas
- Ashley Engle - Texas
- Angie McGinnis - Florida
- Hui Ping Hang - St. John's

== University Park Regional ==
First round November 29–30
3 | Penn State | 3
Siena | 0
University Park, PA
Albany (NY) | 3
Cleveland State | 0
Michigan | 3
Miami (Ohio) | 0
Ann Arbor, MI
Illinois State | 0
14 | Colorado State | 3
11 | Hawai'i | 3
Tennessee State | 0
Louisville, KY
Middle Tennessee | 3
Louisville | 2
BYU | 3
Ole Miss | 0
Seattle, WA
Missouri | 2
6 | Washington | 3

Second round November 30-December 1
3 | Penn State | 3
Albany (NY) | 0
Michigan | 3
14 | Colorado State | 0
11 | Hawai'i | 2
Middle Tennessee | 3
BYU | 3
6 | Washington | 2

Regional semifinals December 7
3 | Penn State | 3
Michigan | 0
Middle Tennessee | 0
BYU | 3

Regional finals December 8
3 | Penn State | 3
BYU | 0

=== Recap ===
The first major upset seen in this bracket was unseeded and unranked BYU defeated six seeded and 2006 national semifinalist Washington on Washington's home court. Before the loss, Washington was undefeated at home in postseason play, boasting a 13–0 record. The second major upset was unseeded Middle Tennessee defeating 11th seeded Hawai'i in the second round. It was the first time in school history Hawai'i lost in the second round, and was also the first time in school history that Middle Tennessee advanced to the sweet 16. Another upset was unseeded Michigan defeating 14th seeded Colorado State.

Penn State, the #3 overall seed, swept past each opponent to advance to their 6th final four in school history and first since winning the NCAA title in 1999. Big Ten Freshman of the Year Arielle Wilson was named the regional most outstanding player.

University Park Regional All-Tournament Team:

- Arielle Wilson (MVP) - Penn State
- Nicole Fawcett - Penn State
- Christa Harmotto - Penn State
- Chelsea Goodman - BYU
- Rachel Dyer - BYU
- Amy Schlauder - BYU
- Izabela Kozen - Middle Tennessee

== Madison Regional ==
First round November 29–30
7 | Wisconsin | 3
Northern Iowa | 0
Madison, WI
Iowa State | 3
San Diego | 2
Duke | 3
American | 2
Durham, NC
Liberty | 1
10 | California | 3
15 | Dayton | 3
Lipscomb | 0
Dayton, OH
Kentucky | 0
Michigan State | 3
Wichita State | 3
WKU | 0
Lincoln, NE
South Dakota State | 0
2 | Nebraska | 3

Second round November 30-December 1
7 | Wisconsin | 0
Iowa State | 3
Duke | 1
10 | California | 3
15 | Dayton | 0
Michigan State | 3
Wichita State | 0
2 | Nebraska | 3

Regional semifinals December 7
Iowa State | 0
10 | California | 3
Michigan State | 2
2 | Nebraska | 3

Regional finals December 8
10 | California | 3
2 | Nebraska | 0

=== Recap ===
The biggest upset in the NCAA tournament occurred in the Madison regional final, where #10 seed California defeated defending champion and #2 seed Nebraska in a sweep. Nebraska saw their dominance slipping after having to come up from 2 games down in the regional semifinals against unseeded Michigan State. Nebraska has also never won a regional final outside of the state of Nebraska, with the exception of the 2006 tournament when they came from 2 games down to defeat Minnesota, and eventually went on to win the title in Omaha, Nebraska. California advanced to their first final four in school history.

Madison Regional All-Tournament Team:

- Hana Cutura (MVP) - California
- Angie Pressey - California
- Carli Lloyd - California
- Sarah Pavan - Nebraska
- Tracy Stalls - Nebraska

== Final Four – ARCO Arena, Sacramento, California ==
National Semifinals; December 13
1 | Stanford | 3
5 | Southern California | 2
3 | Penn State | 3
10 | California | 0

National Championship; December 15
1 | Stanford | 2
3 | Penn State | 3

=== Scouting final four members ===
#1 Stanford: Stanford made the program's NCAA record 17th final four. In 2007 Stanford claimed their 2nd consecutive and 11th overall Pac-10 conference title. Four Stanford players were named AVCA All-Americans: Junior Foluke Akinradewo, senior Bryn Kehoe, and junior Cynthia Barboza took home first team honors while freshman Alix Klineman was placed on second team. Akinradewo was named the AVCA and Pac-10 Player of the Year, while Klineman was named Pac-10 Freshman of the Year. Stanford's two losses of the season came from Washington and Southern California.

#3 Penn State: Penn State made the program's 6th final four. In 2007 Penn State claimed their Big Ten record 5th consecutive outright Big Ten title and 11th overall. Penn State finished the Big Ten season with a 20–0 record, the fourth time since joining in 1991 Penn State accomplished the feat. Four AVCA All-Americans were named on Penn State's squad, junior Nicole Fawcett, junior Christa Harmotto and sophomore Megan Hodge were named to first team while sophomore Alisha Glass took second team. Harmotto was named the Big Ten Player of the Year, while freshman Arielle Wilson, who was also named the University Park Regional most outstanding player, was the Big Ten Freshman of the Year. Penn State's two losses of the season came from Nebraska and Stanford.

#5 Southern California: USC made the program's 8th final four. USC had their hands full in the Gainesville regional, as they had back to back five game matches from Long Beach State and St. John's. They surprisingly swept #4 Texas in the regional finals. Senior Asia Kaczor was named an AVCA First Team All-American while sophomore Taylor Carico was named to second team. USC's four losses of the season came from Stanford, UCLA, Washington and Oregon. Kaczor was also named the Gainesville regional most outstanding player.

#10 California: California made the program's first final four. Senior Angela Pressey, the daughter of Paul Pressey, was named an AVCA First Team All-American and also was selected for her fourth consecutive First Team All-Pac 10 honor, the first time in Cal's history that that happened. Sophomore Hana Cutura, who was also named the Madison regional most outstanding player was named an AVCA Second team All-American. Cal's losses of the season came from Colorado, Stanford twice, USC twice, UCLA and Washington.

== National Semifinal recap ==
=== Stanford vs. Southern California ===
| Teams | Game 1 | Game 2 | Game 3 | Game 4 | Game 5 |
| STAN | 23 | 30 | 30 | 20 | 16 |
| USC | 30 | 20 | 25 | 30 | 14 |

USC started off the match taking the first game, 30–23. Stanford took the next two games, 30-20 & 30–25, before USC took the next game 30–20 to force a 5th game. The 5th game was back and forth, before Stanford saw a 2-point deficit at 11–9. Stanford rallied to tie the match at 12 all. The teams traded points before the score was tied at 13. USC took the next point to earn match point, but a service error on match point tied the game up at 14. Stanford took the next two points to win the match and 5th game, 16–14.

=== Penn State vs. California ===
| Teams | Game 1 | Game 2 | Game 3 |
| PSU | 30 | 30 | 30 |
| CAL | 28 | 25 | 16 |

Penn State defeated California in a sweep, 30–28, 30–25, 30–16. The first game was tied at 28 before a solo block from Blair Brown gave Penn State the game, 30–28. The second game was not as close as Penn State won 30–25, and the third game Penn State won easily 30–16. Penn State advanced to their 5th national championship match in school history.

== National Championship recap: Stanford vs. Penn State ==
| Teams | Game 1 | Game 2 | Game 3 | Game 4 | Game 5 |
| PSU | 30 | 30 | 23 | 19 | 15 |
| STAN | 25 | 26 | 30 | 30 | 8 |

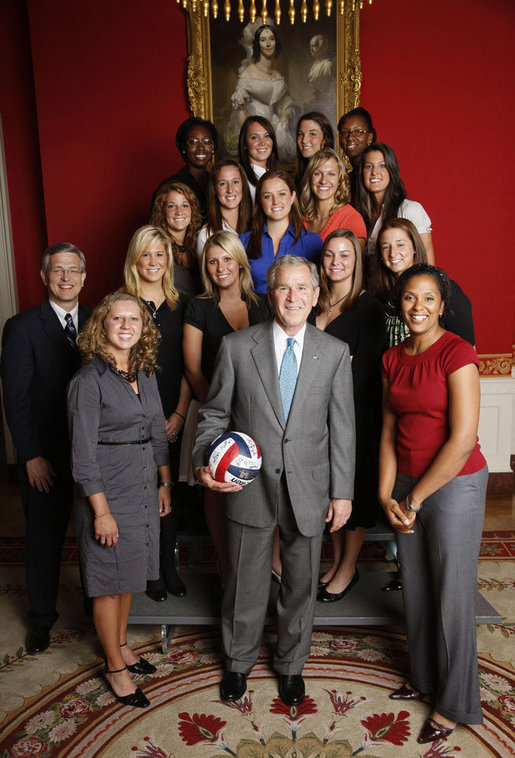
The Pennsylvania State University Nittany Lions, including tournament most valuable player Megan Hodge, are honored at the White House by President of the United States George W. Bush in June 2008 for their winning the national championship.

In front of the second highest crowd in NCAA history to watch a women's volleyball championship match, Penn State, coached by 2007 AVCA National Coach of the Year Russ Rose, was ranked #1 in the AVCA coaches poll since October, but Stanford was the #1 seed, while previously ranked #4 in the poll. This was the third time in a decade that the two teams have met in the NCAA title match, tying an NCAA record. The teams previously met in 1997, when Stanford won in a five-game match, and two years later, when Penn State won in a sweep. Additionally, Penn State and Stanford are the only Division I universities that have made every NCAA tournament appearance since NCAA starting sponsoring in 1981.

Coming into the match, Penn State had the highest hitting percentage in the nation as a team, while Stanford was ranked number 4. The first game started out back at forth with Stanford holding a slight edge at the media timeout at 15–13. The difference proved to be a 6–0 run after the timeout that separated Penn State from Stanford as the Cardinal never got closer than 3 points, with Penn State winning 30–25. The second game was much like the first as it featured many lead changes and ties. Penn State remained in control, never allowing Stanford to get closer than three points, thus winning 30–26 and sending Stanford in the locker room with their first 0–2 deficit of the season.

In the third game, Stanford responded and took control of the third, by winning 30–23, and handing Penn State their first single game loss of the tournament, as Penn State swept through each opponent until that point, ending their bid to become just the 3rd school in NCAA history to sweep through each opponent en route to winning the NCAA title. The fourth game was all Stanford as Penn State saw them take the second game, 30-19 as Stanford did not record a hitting error, and force a 5th game. This was the first five-game match in a championship since rally scoring began in 2001.

In the decisive 5th game, Penn State saw Stanford take a 4–3 lead out of Penn State errors, but after that, it was all Nittany Lions as they did not allow Stanford a single kill in a 7–0 scoring run to take their biggest lead of the night at 10–4. Stanford was not able to get any closer than 4 points. Stanford took their last point on their only kill of the game, but Penn State took the next points to earn match point on a block and MVP Megan Hodge's 26th kill of the match sealed the championship, 15–8. As a team, Stanford hit negatively, with 1 kill, 4 errors on 19 attempts to hit -.158%, compared to Penn State's 11 kills, 5 errors on 21 attempts to hit .286% in the fifth game. Penn State outhit Stanford for the match, .317 to .291, just the second time all season Stanford was outhit. This win snapped a 12-match winning streak by Stanford, while it was the 26th consecutive match won by Penn State, as their last loss of the season was to Stanford exactly three months before on September 15, 2007, in another five game thriller.

== NCAA Tournament records ==
There were three NCAA tournament records that were set in the 2007 tournament that still stand.

- Hitting percentage, tournament (team record) - Penn State, .424% (.514 vs. Siena, .602 vs. Albany, .384 vs. Michigan, .530 vs. BYU, .347 vs. California, .291 vs. Stanford).
- Services aces, tournament (team record) - Penn State, 43 (tied with 1998 Long Beach State) (7 vs. Siena, 9 vs. Albany, 8 vs. Michigan, 11 vs. BYU, 6 vs. California, 2 vs. Stanford).
- Kills, tournament (team record) - Stanford, 421 (55 vs. Santa Clara, 61 vs. Sacramento State, 59 vs. Cal Poly, 91 vs. UCLA, 83 vs. Southern California, 72 vs. Penn State).
