= 2015 Florida Gators women's volleyball team =

American college volleyball season

2015 Florida Gators women's volleyball
- Conference: Southeastern Conference
- Head coach: Mary Wise

The 2015 Florida Gators women's volleyball team represented the University of Florida volleyball program for the 2015 NCAA volleyball season.

== Schedule ==
Legend
	Florida win
	Florida loss
	Postponement
**Bold**	Florida team member

2015 Florida Gators Volleyball Game Log
Regular Season
August

Date	Opponent	Rank	Stadium Site	Score	Attendance	Overall Record	SEC Record
August 29	at James Madison		Harrisonburg, VA	–		–	0–0
August 30	at American		Washington, DC	–		–	0–0

September

Date	Opponent	Rank	Stadium Site	Score	Attendance	Overall Record	SEC Record
September 4	Oregon		Austin, TX	–		–	0–0
September 5	at Texas		Austin, TX	–		–	–
September 10	Eastern Washington		Honolulu, HI	–		–	–
September 11	at Hawaii		Honolulu, HI	–		–	–
September 12	San Diego State		Honolulu, HI	–		–	–
September 17	St. Johns		Gainesville, FL	–		–	–
September 20	Florida State		Gainesville, FL	–		–	–
September 25	Ole Miss		Gainesville, FL	–		–	–
September 27	Kentucky		Gainesville, FL	–		–	–
September 30	at Missouri		Columbia, MO	–		–	–

October

Date	Opponent	Rank	Stadium Site	Score	Attendance	Overall Record	SEC Record
October 4	at Arkansas		Fayatteville, AR	–		–	–
October 9	Texas A&M		Gainesville, FL	–		–	–
October 11	Auburn		Gainesville, FL	–		–	–
October 14	at Tennessee		Knoxville, TN	–		–	–
October 18	at Kentucky		Lexington, KY	–		–	–
October 23	Arkansas		Gainesville, FL	–		–	–
October 25	Missouri		Gainesville, FL	–		–	–
October 30	at South Carolina		Columbia, SC	–		–	–

November

Date	Opponent	Rank	Stadium Site	Score	Attendance	Overall Record	SEC Record
October 4	at Georgia		Athens, GA	–		–	–
October 9	Mississippi State		Gainesville, FL	–		–	–
October 11	at Auburn		Auburn, AL	–		–	–
October 14	Alabama		Gainesville, FL	–		–	–
October 18	Tennessee		Gainesville, FL	–		–	–
October 23	at LSU		Baton Rouge, LA	–		–	–
October 25	at Texas A&M		College Station, TX	–		–	–
October 30	LIU Brooklyn		Gainesville, FL	–		–	–

Postseason
NCAA Tournament

Date	Opponent	Rank	Stadium Site	Score	Attendance	Overall Record	Regional Record
