= 2006 NCAA Division I women's volleyball tournament =

Volleyball competition

2006 NCAA women's Division I volleyball tournament
- 2006 NCAA Final Four logo
- Champions: Nebraska (3rd title)
- Runner-up: Stanford (12th title match)
- Semifinalists: UCLA (11th Final Four); Washington (3rd Final Four)
- Winning coach: John Cook (2nd title)
- Most outstanding player: Sarah Pavan (Nebraska)
- Final Four All-Tournament Team: Jordan Larson (Nebraska); Rachel Holloway (Nebraska); Tracy Stalls (Nebraska); Foluke Akinradewo (Stanford); Cynthia Barboza (Stanford); Kristin Richards (Stanford)

The 2006 NCAA Division I women's volleyball tournament began on November 30, 2006, with 64 teams and concluded on December 16, 2006, when top ranked Nebraska defeated second ranked Stanford 3 sets to 1 in Omaha, Nebraska for the program's third NCAA title.

At the time, the 17,209 national championship match attendance was the highest attended volleyball match ever in the United States. The record was later broken during the 2008 NCAA Semifinals, also held at the Qwest Center.

== Records ==
Thirty-one conferences had an automatic berth to the 2006 NCAA Tournament, and the other 33 spots were filled by at-large bids. The Big Ten, Big 12, and Pac-10 were well-represented as usual, as teams from these conferences made up the top 8 seeds.

Gainesville Regional
| Seed | School | Conference | Berth Type | RPI | Record |
|---|---|---|---|---|---|
| | Albany | America East | Automatic | 120 | 19-12 |
| | American | Patriot | Automatic | 72 | 25-6 |
| | Arizona State | Pac-10 | At-large | 36 | 15-14 |
| | College of Charleston | Southern | Automatic | 87 | 27-7 |
| | Duke | ACC | Automatic | 27 | 28-3 |
| 9 | Florida | SEC | Automatic | 6 | 28-2 |
| | Florida A&M | MEAC | Automatic | 81 | 21-6 |
| | Jacksonville State | Ohio Valley | Automatic | 61 | 24-4 |
| 8 | Minnesota | Big Ten | At-large | 4 | 23-7 |
| 1 | Nebraska | Big 12 | Automatic | 1 | 27-1 |
| | Northern Iowa | Missouri Valley | Automatic | 28 | 27-7 |
| 16 | San Diego | West Coast | Automatic | 13 | 24-5 |
| | Siena | MAAC | Automatic | 147 | 22-12 |
| | St. John's | Big East | At-large | 24 | 30-4 |
| | Tennessee | SEC | At-large | 44 | 19-11 |
| | Winthrop | Big South | Automatic | 64 | 34-2 |

Seattle Regional
| Seed | School | Conference | Berth Type | RPI | Record |
|---|---|---|---|---|---|
| | Belmont | Atlantic Sun | Automatic | 78 | 24-6 |
| | Colorado | Big 12 | At-large | 23 | 16-11 |
| | Colorado State | Mountain West | Automatic | 30 | 20-9 |
| | Cornell | Ivy League | Automatic | 93 | 18-8 |
| | Hofstra | CAA | Automatic | 35 | 23-6 |
| | Kentucky | SEC | At-large | 49 | 18-11 |
| | Long Island | Northeast | Automatic | 103 | 25-10 |
| | Louisville | Big East | Automatic | 21 | 25-6 |
| | Middle Tennessee State | Sun Belt | Automatic | 47 | 26-7 |
| | New Mexico State | WAC | At-large | 29 | 33-3 |
| | Ohio | MAC | Automatic | 22 | 28-4 |
| 11 | Ohio State | Big Ten | At-large | 15 | 23-7 |
| 3 | Penn State | Big Ten | Automatic | 3 | 29-2 |
| 14 | Purdue | Big Ten | At-large | 16 | 21-10 |
| | Saint Louis | Atlantic 10 | Automatic | 50 | 22-8 |
| 6 | Washington | Pac-10 | At-large | 10 | 25-4 |

Honolulu Regional
| Seed | School | Conference | Berth Type | RPI | Record |
|---|---|---|---|---|---|
| | Arkansas | SEC | At-large | 39 | 16-12 |
| | BYU | Mountain West | At-large | 40 | 24-5 |
| 12 | Hawaii | WAC | Automatic | 12 | 26-5 |
| | Long Beach State | Big West | At-large | 26 | 25-5 |
| | Michigan State | Big Ten | At-large | 34 | 19-11 |
| | Mississippi | SEC | At-large | 53 | 19-12 |
| | Missouri State | Missouri Valley | At-large | 37 | 26-8 |
| 13 | Oklahoma | Big 12 | At-large | 14 | 26-5 |
| | Oral Roberts | Mid-Continent | Automatic | 82 | 26-8 |
| | Oregon | Pac-10 | At-large | 42 | 17-11 |
| | Pepperdine | West Coast | At-large | 20 | 16-11 |
| | UAB | Conference USA | Automatic | 89 | 27-9 |
| | UC Santa Barbara | Big West | At-large | 51 | 19-11 |
| 4 | UCLA | Pac-10 | At-large | 2 | 29-3 |
| 5 | USC | Pac-10 | At-large | 8 | 25-4 |
| | Utah | Mountain West | At-large | 18 | 27-3 |

Austin Regional
| Seed | School | Conference | Berth Type | RPI | Record |
|---|---|---|---|---|---|
| | Alabama | SEC | At-large | 57 | 17-12 |
| 15 | Cal Poly | Big West | Automatic | 17 | 22-5 |
| | California | Pac-10 | At-large | 19 | 20-9 |
| | Iowa State | Big 12 | At-large | 32 | 20-10 |
| | LSU | SEC | At-large | 11 | 26-5 |
| | Michigan | Big Ten | At-large | 25 | 21-12 |
| | Milwaukee | Horizon | Automatic | 38 | 24-5 |
| | Missouri | Big 12 | At-large | 45 | 17-12 |
| | Notre Dame | Big East | At-large | 48 | 18-13 |
| | Prairie View A&M | SWAC | Automatic | 213 | 23-10 |
| | Sacramento State | Big Sky | Automatic | 41 | 30-5 |
| | Santa Clara | West Coast | At-large | 31 | 20-7 |
| 2 | Stanford | Pac-10 | Automatic | 5 | 25-3 |
| | Stephen F. Austin | Southland | Automatic | 43 | 30-3 |
| 7 | Texas | Big 12 | At-large | 9 | 21-6 |
| 10 | Wisconsin | Big Ten | At-large | 7 | 24-6 |

== Gainesville Regional ==
First round November 30-December 1
1 | Nebraska | 3
American | 1
Lincoln, NE
Winthrop | 1
Northern Iowa | 3
Tennessee | 1
Duke | 3
Knoxville, TN
Jacksonville St. | 0
16 | San Diego | 3
9 | Florida | 3
Florida A&M | 0
Gainesville, FL
College of Charleston | 0
Arizona St. | 3
St. John's (NY) | 3
Albany | 1
Albany, NY
Siena | 0
8 | Minnesota | 3

Second round December 2–3
1 | Nebraska | 3
Northern Iowa | 0
Duke | 2
16 | San Diego | 3
9 | Florida | 3
Arizona St. | 1
St. John's (NY) | 2
8 | Minnesota | 3

Regional semifinals December 8
1 | Nebraska | 3
16 | San Diego | 0
9 | Florida | 1
8 | Minnesota | 3

Regional finals December 9
1 | Nebraska | 3
8 | Minnesota | 2

=== Upsets ===
In the Gainesville region, no seed was a victim of an upset, although some were very close to doing so. In the first round, unseeded American put a scare into top seeded Nebraska by taking game 3 from them, but Nebraska responded by winning the fourth game, 30–16. In the second round, unseeded St. John's took 8th seeded Minnesota to 5 games, losing the 5th, 15–12. As expected, Nebraska and Minnesota reached the regional finals, and Minnesota almost pulled off the biggest upset of the tournament by winning the first two games. Top seeded Nebraska rallied back from the 0–2 deficit and won the fifth game, 15–9. Nebraska sophomore Jordan Larson was named the regional's most outstanding player, as she tallied a career high 21 kills in the dramatic comeback win.

This marked the first time in Nebraska's history that they won a regional final outside of the state of Nebraska. Nebraska advanced in hopes of making up for their 2005 national championship loss to Washington.

== Honolulu Regional ==
First round November 30-December 1
5 | Southern California | 3
Mississippi | 0
Los Angeles, CA
UCSB | 2
BYU | 3
Pepperdine | 1
Long Beach State | 3
Long Beach, CA
Oregon | 0
12 | Hawai'i | 3
13 | Oklahoma | 3
Oral Roberts | 0
Fayetteville, AR
Missouri St. | 3
Arkansas | 1
Utah | 3
Michigan St. | 2
Los Angeles, CA
UAB | 0
4 | UCLA | 3

Second round December 2–3
5 | Southern California | 3
BYU | 0
Long Beach St. | 1
12 | Hawai'i | 3
13 | Oklahoma | 3
Missouri St. | 0
Utah | 0
4 | UCLA | 3

Regional semifinals December 8
5 | Southern California | 2
12 | Hawai'i | 3
13 | Oklahoma | 0
4 | UCLA | 3

Regional finals December 9
12 | Hawai'i | 0
4 | UCLA | 3

=== Upsets ===
Each expected team, Hawai'i, UCLA, Southern California and Oklahoma reached the regional semifinals, and as expected, UCLA defeated Oklahoma. The other semifinal was a different story, as 12th seeded Hawai'i pulled off the biggest upset of the regional by defeating Southern California in 5 games, 28–30, 30–21, 21–30, 30–27, 15–5 in front of a partisan Hawai'i crowd. Hawai'i could not continue the upsets however, against overall number 4 seed UCLA in the regional finals. UCLA advanced to their first final four since 1994.

== Seattle Regional ==
First round November 30-December 1
3 | Penn State | 3
Long Island | 0
University Park, PA
Cornell | 2
Hofstra | 3
Kentucky | 3
Ohio | 2
West Lafayette, IN
St. Louis | 0
14 | Purdue | 3
11 | Ohio St. | 3
Belmont | 0
Louisville, KY
Middle Tennessee | 3
Louisville | 2
Colorado | 3
New Mexico St. | 0
Boulder, CO
Colorado St. | 1
6 | Washington | 3

Second round December 2–3
3 | Penn State | 3
Hofstra | 0
Kentucky | 0
14 | Purdue | 3
11 | Ohio St. | 3
Middle Tennessee | 1
Colorado | 0
6 | Washington | 3

Regional semifinals December 8
3 | Penn State | 3
14 | Purdue | 0
11 | Ohio St. | 0
6 | Washington | 3

Regional finals December 9
3 | Penn State | 1
6 | Washington | 3

=== Upsets ===
Much like the previous two regionals, each seeded team reached the Sweet 16 as expected. Penn State swept past Big Ten foe Purdue, while host Washington swept past Ohio State. Perhaps the biggest upset of the tournament occurred in the regional final, when defending champion Washington defeated third seed Penn State on UW's home floor in front of 6,000 fans. The win improved the Huskies to 12–0 at home in postseason play. Washington advanced to their third consecutive final four in hopes of defending their 2005 national title.

== Austin Regional ==
First round November 30-December 1
7 | Texas | 3
Prairie View | 0
Austin, TX
Stephen F. Austin | 3
Alabama | 0
Iowa St. | 3
Wisconsin–Milwaukee | 0
Madison, WI
Notre Dame | 0
10 | Wisconsin | 3
15 | Cal Poly | 3
Michigan | 1
San Luis Obispo, CA
California | 3
LSU | 1
Missouri | 3
Santa Clara | 2
Stanford, CA
Sacramento St. | 0
2 | Stanford | 3

Second round December 2–3
7 | Texas | 3
Stephen F. Austin | 0
Iowa St. | 0
10 | Wisconsin | 3
15 | Cal Poly | 1
California | 3
Missouri | 2
2 | Stanford | 3

Regional semifinals December 8
7 | Texas | 3
10 | Wisconsin | 0
California | 0
2 | Stanford | 3

Regional finals December 9
7 | Texas | 1
2 | Stanford | 3

=== Upsets ===
The Austin regional saw no major upsets. In sub-regional final action, California upset #15 seed Cal Poly to become the only unseeded team to make the Sweet 16 and unseeded Missouri gave #2 seed Stanford a scare by pushing them to five games.

== Final Four – Qwest Center, Omaha, Nebraska ==
National Semifinals; December 14
1 | Nebraska | 3
4 | UCLA | 1
2 | Stanford | 3
6 | Washington | 0

National Championship; December 16
1 | Nebraska | 3
2 | Stanford | 1

== National Semifinal recap ==
=== Nebraska vs. UCLA ===
| Teams | Game 1 | Game 2 | Game 3 | Game 4 |
| NEB | 23 | 30 | 30 | 30 |
| UCLA | 30 | 28 | 23 | 28 |

The first semifinal began on December 14, 2006. Top seeded Nebraska was playing in front of an NCAA record 17,013 Husker fans in Omaha. Nebraska dropped the first game, 23–30, but rallied to win the next three. AVCA National Player of the Year Sarah Pavan served 10 straight points in one of the games and had 22 kills in the match. The loss ended UCLA's bid to win their first NCAA title since 1991, but it was still a successful season as AVCA National Coach of the Year Andy Banachowski guided the 2006 squad to its first 30-win season since 1994.

=== Stanford vs. Washington ===
| Teams | Game 1 | Game 2 | Game 3 |
| STAN | 30 | 30 | 30 |
| WASH | 12 | 25 | 15 |

In the second semifinal, second seeded Stanford completely dominated the match, knocking out defending national champion Washington. As a team, Washington hit .000% compared to the Cardinal's .315. Four of six Washington players hit either negative or .000 %. The Cardinal advanced to their 12th title match in school history, in hopes of winning their 7th NCAA title.

== National Championship recap: Nebraska vs. Stanford ==
| Teams | Game 1 | Game 2 | Game 3 | Game 4 |
| NEB | 27 | 30 | 30 | 30 |
| STAN | 30 | 26 | 28 | 27 |

Nebraska and Stanford were the top two overall seeds and it was only the second time the top two seeds met in an NCAA Division I Women's Volleyball Championship title match.

Stanford took game 1, 30–27, thanks to a .304 hitting % compared to the Huskers' .196. Nebraska responded in game 2, defeating the Cardinal, 30–26, to send the teams into the locker room with one game won apiece.

Game 3 was close like the first two, until the Huskers saw a 26-22 point deficit. With game 3 looking close to a Cardinal victory, behind good Husker defense, they rallied to tie the game at 28, and eventually won the game on a kill by Pavan, 30–28.

Game 4 was once again close until the end, when the Huskers took a 27–22 lead. However, by good defense and a reversal from game 3, the Cardinal rallied to catch up. Stanford staved off two championship points and came within two at 29–27, but a kill after a Huskers' timeout by sophomore Jordan Larson ricocheted off a Stanford defender and sent the Huskers to victory and their first title since going undefeated in 2000. They also became the first school since 1991 to win the national title as the host institution. Nebraska finished the season with a 33–1 record, with their only loss coming to Big 12 opponent Colorado in a five-game upset. Nebraska became just the second team in NCAA history to stay at a number 1 ranking for the entire year.
