= 2002 NCAA Division I women's volleyball tournament =

Volleyball competition

2002 NCAA women's Division I volleyball tournament
- 2002 NCAA Final Four logo
- Champions: Southern California (2nd NCAA (5th national) title)
- Runner-up: Stanford (10th title match)
- Semifinalists: Florida (6th Final Four); Hawaiʻi (7th Final Four)
- Winning coach: Mick Haley (2nd title)
- Most outstanding player: Keao Burdine (Southern California)
- Final Four All-Tournament Team: Katie Olsovsky (Southern California); April Ross (Southern California); Logan Tom (Stanford); Ogonna Nnamani (Stanford); Kim Willoughby (Hawaiʻi)

The 2002 NCAA Division I women's volleyball tournament began on December 5, 2002 with 64 teams and concluded on December 21 when Southern California defeated Stanford 3 games to 1 in New Orleans, Louisiana for the program's second NCAA title and fifth overall national title.

It was Southern California's first national title since 1981, while Stanford was the defending 2001 national champion. Semifinalist Hawaiʻi was making the program's seventh NCAA final four appearance, while Florida made the program's first final four appearance in four years.

== Records ==
The conference champion from each of 31 conferences earned a bid to the 2002 NCAA Volleyball Tournament, along with 33 at-large bids. The Big Ten and Pac-10 led all conferences with eight bids each. In all, ten conferences had a team ranked in the top 16 of the tournament. As of 2017, this is the most conferences represented by seeded teams in a single tournament in the 64-team era (since 1998).

West Regional
Seed	School	Conference	Berth Type	Record
	Cal Poly	Big West	At-large	15-12
	California	Pac-10	At-large	19-11
	College of Charleston	Southern	Automatic	29-5
	Fresno State	WAC	At-large	23-6
	George Mason	CAA	Automatic	22-7
	Long Beach State	Big West	At-large	28-3
	Michigan State	Big Ten	At-large	19-11
16	Notre Dame	Big East	Automatic	23-7
9	Pepperdine	West Coast	Automatic	23-6
	San Diego	West Coast	At-large	25-7
	Santa Clara	West Coast	At-large	24-6
	Texas A&M	Big 12	At-large	20-9
	UCLA	Pac-10	At-large	19-13
8	UC Santa Barbara	Big West	Automatic	28-2
1	USC	Pac-10	Automatic	25-1
	Utah	Mountain West	Automatic	25-8

Central Regional
Seed	School	Conference	Berth Type	Record
	Alabama A&M	SWAC	Automatic	24-7
	American	Patriot	Automatic	26-7
	Arizona State	Pac-10	At-large	14-11
	Cincinnati	Conference USA	At-large	23-8
	Colorado State	Mountain West	At-large	22-9
	Duke	ACC	At-large	24-9
6	Hawaii	WAC	Automatic	30-1
	Miami (FL)	Big East	At-large	25-5
3	Nebraska	Big 12	Automatic	27-1
11	North Carolina	ACC	At-large	30-3
	South Carolina	SEC	At-large	21-6
	Tennessee-Martin	Ohio Valley	Automatic	24-5
	Washington	Pac-10	At-large	19-10
	Western Kentucky	Sun Belt	Automatic	33-4
	Winthrop	Big South	Automatic	28-10
14	Wisconsin	Big Ten	At-large	23-8

East Regional
Seed	School	Conference	Berth Type	Record
5	Florida	SEC	Automatic	30-2
	Florida State	ACC	At-large	21-12
	Kansas State	Big 12	At-large	20-8
	Manhattan	MAAC	Automatic	30-2
	Michigan	Big Ten	At-large	16-14
	Milwaukee	Horizon	Automatic	20-13
	Missouri	Big 12	At-large	25-7
4	Northern Iowa	Missouri Valley	Automatic	32-2
	Northwestern	Big Ten	At-large	17-15
	Oral Roberts	Mid-Continent	Automatic	22-10
	Penn	Ivy League	Automatic	22-4
12	Penn State	Big Ten	At-large	24-7
	South Florida	Conference USA	Automatic	29-6
	Temple	Atlantic 10	Automatic	26-6
	UCF	Atlantic Sun	Automatic	22-12
13	Washington State	Pac-10	At-large	21-7

Pacific Regional
Seed	School	Conference	Berth Type	Record
10	Arizona	Pac-10	At-large	17-11
	Ball State	MAC	Automatic	25-7
	Florida A&M	MEAC	Automatic	23-6
	Georgia Tech	ACC	Automatic	32-5
	Indiana	Big Ten	At-large	20-12
	Louisville	Conference USA	At-large	27-5
7	Minnesota	Big Ten	Automatic	30-5
	Nevada	WAC	At-large	22-9
	New Hampshire	America East	Automatic	23-10
15	Ohio State	Big Ten	At-large	19-10
	Pacific	Big West	At-large	18-12
	Robert Morris	Northeast	Automatic	27-11
	Sacramento State	Big Sky	Automatic	24-10
2	Stanford	Pac-10	At-large	27-4
	Texas	Big 12	At-large	22-8
	Texas-Arlington	Southland	Automatic	26-6

== West Regional (Santa Barbara) ==
First round December 5-7
1	Southern California	3
San Diego	0
Los Angeles, CA
Utah	0
Texas A&M	3
Michigan State	3
George Mason	0
Notre Dame, IN
College of Charleston	1
16	Notre Dame	3
9	Pepperdine	3
Cal Poly	0
Malibu, CA
UCLA	3
Long Beach State	0
Santa Clara	1
California	3
Santa Barbara, CA
Fresno State	1
8	UCSB	3

Second round December 7-8
1	Southern California	3
Texas A&M	0
Michigan State	3
16	Notre Dame	0
9	Pepperdine	3
UCLA	1
California	0
8	UCSB	3

Regional semifinals December 12-13
1	Southern California	3
Michigan State	0
9	Pepperdine	3
8	UCSB	1

Regional finals December 13-14
1	Southern California	3
9	Pepperdine	0

== East Regional (Gainesville) ==
First round December 5-7
5	Florida	3
Central Florida	0
Gainesville, FL
Florida State	0
South Florida	3
Temple	3
Manhattan	1
University Park, PA
Pennsylvania	0
12	Penn State	3
13	Washington State	3
Oral Roberts	0
Manhattan, KS
Michigan	0
Kansas State	3
Missouri	3
Northwestern	1
Cedar Falls, IA
UW–Milwaukee	1
4	Northern Iowa	3

Second round December 7-8
5	Florida	3
South Florida	1
Temple	3
12	Penn State	1
13	Washington State	3
Kansas State	1
Missouri	2
4	Northern Iowa	3

Regional semifinals December 12-13
5	Florida	3
Temple	0
13	Washington State	3
4	Northern Iowa	0

Regional finals December 13-14
5	Florida	3
13	Washington State	1

== Central Regional (Lincoln) ==
First round December 5-7
3	Nebraska	3
Tennessee-Martin	0
Lincoln, NE
Arizona State	3
Cincinnati	2
Miami (FL)	3
Duke	0
Madison, WI
Alabama A&M	0
14	Wisconsin	3
11	North Carolina	3
Winthrop	0
Chapel Hill, NC
American	1
South Carolina	3
Washington	3
Colorado State	1
Honolulu, HI
Western Kentucky	0
6	Hawaiʻi	3

Second round December 7-8
3	Nebraska	3
Arizona State	0
Miami (FL)	3
14	Wisconsin	1
11	North Carolina	3
South Carolina	1
Washington	0
6	Hawaiʻi	3

Regional semifinals December 12-13
3	Nebraska	3
Miami (FL)	0
11	North Carolina	0
6	Hawaiʻi	3

Regional finals December 13-14
3	Nebraska	1
6	Hawaiʻi	3

== Pacific Regional (Stanford) ==
First round December 5-7
7	Minnesota	3
New Hampshire	1
Minneapolis, MN
Florida A&M	0
Georgia Tech	3
Texas	3
Indiana	2
Tucson, AZ
Texas-Arlington	0
10	Arizona	3
15	Ohio State	3
Robert Morris	0
Columbus, OH
Ball State	0
Louisville	3
Pacific	3
Nevada	2
Stanford, CA
Sacramento State	0
2	Stanford	3

Second round December 7-8
7	Minnesota	3
Georgia Tech	1
Texas	2
10	Arizona	3
15	Ohio State	3
Louisville	0
Pacific	1
2	Stanford	3

Regional semifinals December 12-13
7	Minnesota	1
10	Arizona	3
15	Ohio State	0
2	Stanford	3

Regional finals December 13-14
10	Arizona	0
2	Stanford	3

== Final Four – New Orleans Arena, New Orleans, Louisiana ==
National Semifinals; December 19
1	Southern California	3
5	Florida	1
6	Hawaii	0
2	Stanford	3

National Championship; December 21
1	Southern California	3
2	Stanford	1

== National Semifinals ==
=== Southern California vs. Florida ===
Teams	Game 1	Game 2	Game 3	Game 4
USC	24	30	30	30
FLA	30	25	26	24

When Florida took the first set, it was the first time in 6 NCAA Semifinal appearances that a Florida team was able to win a single set. However, the rest didn't go their way as USC won the next three to advance to the national championship. In the deciding fourth set, USC took the 16-8 lead before Florida came back to cut the lead to 19-17, but the Gators were unable to take the lead before USC won the fourth set, 30-24 and the match.

=== Stanford vs. Hawaiʻi ===
Teams	Game 1	Game 2	Game 3
STAN	30	30	30
HAW	25	27	24

Stanford got a chance to defend their 2001 NCAA title after dismantling Hawaiʻi, 3-0. The 3-0 loss was only Hawaiʻi's second loss of the season, with their other loss coming to Stanford in a 3-0 sweep in the preseason. Ogonna Nnamani led Stanford with 15 kills, while Hawaiʻi was led by Kim Willoughby who had 22 kills.

== National Championship: Southern California vs. Stanford ==
Teams	Game 1	Game 2	Game 3	Game 4
USC	30	23	30	30
STAN	27	30	24	26

USC dethroned defending NCAA national champion Stanford in a 3-1 match to finish the season 31-1, with their only loss coming to Stanford. In set one, USC had 22 kills while Stanford had just 8, leading them to a 30-27 victory. In set two, Stanford came back to take 9 of the first 12 points en route to the easy 30-23.

USC sprinted to the 19-10 lead in set 3, before the Cardinal cut the advantage at 20-17. USC's offense proved to be too much, as they won it 30-24. In set 4, USC cruised out to an early 6-1 lead and then 17-11. The lead soon disappeared, with Stanford tying it up at 19, before USC pulled away again to win the fourth set 30-26 and take home the national title. It was USC's first national championship since 1981, the first year that NCAA started to sponsor women's volleyball.
