= 2008 NCAA Division I women's volleyball tournament =

Volleyball competition

2008 NCAA women's Division I volleyball tournament
- 2008 NCAA Final Four logo
- Champions: Penn State (3rd title)
- Runner-up: Stanford (14th title match)
- Semifinalists: Nebraska (11th Final Four); Texas (5th Final Four)
- Winning coach: Russ Rose (3rd title)
- Most outstanding player: Megan Hodge (Penn State)
- Final Four All-Tournament Team: Nicole Fawcett (Penn State); Alisha Glass (Penn State); Cynthia Barboza (Stanford); Alix Klineman (Stanford); Jordan Larson (Nebraska); Destinee Hooker (Texas)

The 2008 NCAA Division I women's volleyball tournament began on December 4, 2008 with 64 teams and concluded on December 20, 2008 when Penn State defeated Stanford, 3 sets to 0, in Omaha, Nebraska for the program's third NCAA title.

With the win, Penn State repeated as national champions and won their NCAA record 64th consecutive match, becoming only the fourth team in NCAA history to finish the season undefeated, as they went 38-0 and joined Southern California as the only repeat NCAA national champions to go undefeated.

The 2008 NCAA Final Four, held at the Qwest Center, was the first in the rally-scoring era (since 2001) in which all top four seeds reached the final four.

This was the first year in which the term "set" replaced "game", with 25 points needed to win a set. From 2001 through 2007, 30 points were required to win a game.

== Records ==
University Park Regional
Seed	School	Conference	Berth Type	RPI	Record
8	California	Pac-10	At-large	13	23-6
	Cincinnati	Big East	At-large	33	26-6
	Dayton	Atlantic 10	At-large	43	21-12
9	Illinois	Big Ten	At-large	7	24-7
	Long Island	Northeast	Automatic	136	19-11
	Milwaukee	Horizon	Automatic	69	23-8
	New Mexico State	WAC	At-large	31	25-8
	Ohio	MAC	Automatic	17	24-7
1	Penn State	Big Ten	Automatic	1	32-0
	Saint Mary's (CA)	West Coast	At-large	40	20-7
	Siena	MAAC	Automatic	121	20-12
	Tennessee Tech	Ohio Valley	Automatic	108	19-12
16	Tulane	Conference USA	Automatic	9	27-5
	Western Kentucky	Sun Belt	Automatic	26	26-9
	Western Michigan	MAC	At-large	34	26-6
	Yale	Ivy League	Automatic	41	20-5

Austin Regional
Seed	School	Conference	Berth Type	RPI	Record
	American	Patriot	Automatic	89	24-8
	Delaware	Colonial	Automatic	124	19-15
	Duke	ACC	At-large	32	24-8
	Iowa State	Big 12	At-large	51	19-12
	Lamar	Southland	Automatic	164	17-11
	LSU	SEC	At-large	49	18-9
6	Minnesota	Big Ten	At-large	6	26-6
	North Carolina	ACC	Automatic	38	21-10
	North Dakota State	Summit	Automatic	80	24-3
	Northern Iowa	Missouri Valley	At-large	44	25-8
11	Oregon	Pac-10	At-large	14	23-8
	Rice	Conference USA	At-large	28	23-7
	San Francisco	West Coast	At-large	35	22-7
3	Texas	Big 12	At-large	4	25-3
14	UCLA	Pac-10	At-large	27	20-10
	Wichita State	Missouri Valley	At-large	18	29-1

Seattle Regional
Seed	School	Conference	Berth Type	RPI	Record
	Alabama A&M	SWAC	Automatic	255	12-14
	Clemson	ACC	At-large	39	23-9
	Furman	Southern	Automatic	95	21-13
	Kansas State	Big 12	At-large	23	24-7
	Kentucky	SEC	At-large	30	26-5
	Liberty	Big South	Automatic	87	25-8
	Michigan	Big Ten	At-large	22	24-8
	Missouri State	Missouri Valley	Automatic	75	23-12
4	Nebraska	Big 12	Automatic	3	27-2
	Portland State	Big Sky	Automatic	103	20-8
13	Saint Louis	Atlantic 10	Automatic	5	28-4
	Santa Clara	West Coast	At-large	36	17-9
	Tennessee	SEC	At-large	50	22-9
	UAB	Conference USA	At-large	21	26-7
12	Utah	Mountain West	Automatic	16	24-5
5	Washington	Pac-10	At-large	8	24-4

Fort Collins Regional
Seed	School	Conference	Berth Type	RPI	Record
	Albany	America East	Automatic	55	23-8
	Belmont	Atlantic Sun	Automatic	94	25-7
	Colorado State	Mountain West	At-large	25	22-6
	FIU	Sun Belt	At-large	19	28-6
15	Florida	SEC	Automatic	10	25-3
	Florida A&M	MEAC	Automatic	171	14-12
7	Hawaiʻi	WAC	Automatic	12	28-3
	Long Beach State	Big West	Automatic	29	25-5
	Louisville	Big East	Automatic	54	19-10
	Miami (Oh.)	MAC	At-large	48	21-11
	Middle Tennessee	Sun Belt	At-large	20	26-7
	Pepperdine	West Coast	At-large	37	20-7
10	Purdue	Big Ten	At-large	11	24-8
	San Diego	West Coast	Automatic	15	23-4
2	Stanford	Pac-10	Automatic	2	26-3
	USC	Pac-10	At-large	24	16-11

== University Park Regional ==
First round December 4–5
1	Penn State	3
Long Island	0
University Park, PA
Yale	3
Ohio	2
Western Michigan	3
Dayton	1
Dayton, OH
Tennessee Tech	1
16	Tulane	3
9	Illinois	3
Milwaukee	0
Champaign, IL
Cincinnati	3
Western Kentucky	2
New Mexico State	3
St. Mary's (Ca.)	1
Berkeley, CA
Siena	0
8	California	3

Second round December 5–6
1	Penn State	3
Yale	0
Western Michigan	3
16	Tulane	2
9	Illinois	3
Cincinnati	0
New Mexico State	1
8	California	3

Regional semifinals December 12
1	Penn State	3
Western Michigan	0
9	Illinois	0
8	California	3

Regional finals December 13
1	Penn State	3
8	California	0

=== Regional recap ===
Just as they had done all season, Penn State swept past Western Michigan, who was making their first Sweet 16 appearance in 21 years. When Penn State won the third set, they broke the NCAA record for consecutive sets won at 106 (The previous record of 105 was held by Florida from 2003.)

In the other Sweet 16 match, California swept Illinois, setting up a rematch of the 2007 NCAA National Semifinals with Penn State.

Despite getting a test from California in the first set, Penn State swept the Bears again to head to their second straight Final Four, bringing the program's total to seven Final Four appearances. California ended their season at 26-7, which was the most wins in the program's history in a single season.

University Park Regional All-Tournament Team:
- Megan Hodge (MVP) - Penn State
- Christa Harmotto - Penn State
- Nicole Fawcett - Penn State
- Alisha Glass - Penn State
- Blair Brown - Penn State
- Am'ra Soloman - California
- Laura DeBruler - Illinois

== Seattle Regional ==
First round December 4–5
5	Washington	3
Portland State	0
Seattle, WA
Santa Clara	3
Kansas State	1
Tennessee	2
Clemson	3
Clemson, SC
Furman	0
12	Utah	3
13	St. Louis	3
Alabama A&M	0
Lexington, KY
Kentucky	2
Michigan	3
UAB	3
Missouri State	0
Lincoln, NE
Liberty	1
4	Nebraska	3

Second round December 5–6
5	Washington	3
Santa Clara	0
Clemson	0
12	Utah	3
13	St. Louis	2
Michigan	3
UAB	0
4	Nebraska	3

Regional semifinals December 12
5	Washington	3
12	Utah	0
Michigan	0
4	Nebraska	3

Regional finals December 13
5	Washington	2
4	Nebraska	3

=== Regional recap ===
Washington and Nebraska both swept past their Sweet 16 opponents with ease, to set up a rematch of the 2005 NCAA National Championship.

Washington, who had never lost an NCAA regional that they hosted, seemed to be heading to the Final Four after going up 2-0 on Nebraska. Out of the break, however, Nebraska regained focus and easily beat Washington in set 3, before winning a close set 4. In the decisive fifth set, Washington looked to be on the brink of victory after building a seemingly insurmountable 9-3 lead. Nebraska mounted a stunning comeback, though, and took 9 straight points. The Huskies tied it up at 13, before a Husky hitting error gave the Huskers match point. Nebraska senior Jordan Larson served out an ace to close out the stunning comeback. Nebraska advanced to their third Final Four in four years, and eleventh overall. Washington finished their season 27-5 and was the Pac-10 runners-up.

Seattle Regional All-Tournament Team:
- Tara Mueller (MVP) - Nebraska
- Jordan Larson - Nebraska
- Sydney Anderson - Nebraska
- Lindsey Licht - Nebraska
- Becky Perry - Washington
- Tamari Miyashiro - Washington
- Jenna Hagglund - Washington

== Austin Regional ==
First round December 4–5
3	Texas	3
Lamar	0
Austin, TX
Wichita State	3
Rice	1
San Francisco	2
Duke	3
Los Angeles, CA
LSU	1
14	UCLA	3
11	Oregon	3
Delaware	0
Washington, DC
American	0
North Carolina	3
Northern Iowa	1
Iowa State	3
Minneapolis, MN
North Dakota State	0
6	Minnesota	3

Second round December 5–6
3	Texas	3
Wichita State	0
Duke	0
14	UCLA	3
11	Oregon	3
North Carolina	1
Iowa State	3
6	Minnesota	1

Regional semifinals December 12
3	Texas	3
14	UCLA	1
11	Oregon	2
Iowa State	3

Regional finals December 13
3	Texas	3
Iowa State	1

=== Regional recap ===
Texas defeated UCLA in four sets to advance to their third straight NCAA Regional Final. Iowa State continued their dream run, upsetting 11th-seeded Oregon in five sets, just after upsetting sixth-seeded Minnesota in four sets in Minneapolis in the second round.

After Texas took the 2-0 lead, Iowa State bounced back to take the third set and extend the match. However, Texas responded in the fourth set, defeating the Cyclones easily to advance to the program's first final four since 1995. Iowa State ended their season at 22-13 and made their first Elite Eight appearance in school history.

Austin Regional All-Tournament Team
- Lauren Paolini (MVP) - Texas
- Destinee Hooker - Texas
- Michelle Kocher - Texas
- Victoria Henson - Iowa State
- Kaylee Manns - Iowa State
- Ali Daley - UCLA
- Heather Myers - Oregon

== Fort Collins Regional ==
First round December 4–5
7	Hawaiʻi	3
Belmont	0
Los Angeles, CA
San Diego	1
Southern California	3
Middle Tennessee	3
Miami (OH)	2
West Lafayette, IN
Louisville	2
10	Purdue	3
15	Florida	3
Florida A&M	0
Gainesville, FL
Florida International	1
Colorado State	3
Pepperdine	1
Long Beach State	3
Palo Alto, CA
Albany (NY)	0
2	Stanford	3

Second round December 5–6
7	Hawaiʻi	3
Southern California	0
Middle Tennessee	2
10	Purdue	3
15	Florida	3
Colorado State	0
Long Beach State	0
2	Stanford	3

Regional semifinals December 12
7	Hawaiʻi	3
10	Purdue	1
15	Florida	0
2	Stanford	3

Regional finals December 13
7	Hawaiʻi	0
2	Stanford	3

=== Regional recap ===
Second seeded Stanford had no troubles with 15th-seeded Florida, sweeping them to earn their spot in the Elite Eight. Hawaiʻi defeated Purdue in four close sets to advance.

Stanford dominated Hawaiʻi in the regional final, which included winning the second set 25-9. Hawaiʻi recorded 29 hitting errors in the match, while Stanford had just 7. Hawaiʻi ended their season at 31-4 as the WAC co-champions. Stanford advanced to their third Final Four in a row, bringing the school total to an NCAA record 18 appearances.

Fort Collins Regional All-Tournament Team
- Foluke Akinradewo (MVP) - Stanford
- Cassidy Lichtman - Stanford
- Alix Klineman - Stanford
- Kanani Danielson - Hawaiʻi
- Jamie Houston - Hawaiʻi
- Kristin Arthurs - Purdue
- Stephanie Lynch - Purdue

== Final Four – Qwest Center, Omaha, Nebraska ==
National Semifinals; December 18
1	Penn State	3
4	Nebraska	2
3	Texas	2
2	Stanford	3

National Championship; December 20
1	Penn State	3
2	Stanford	0

== National Semifinals recap ==
=== Stanford vs. Texas ===
Teams	Set 1	Set 2	Set 3	Set 4	Set 5
STAN	20	18	25	25	15
TEX	25	25	15	22	13

In a rematch of the 2008 AVCA Showcase, Stanford once again beat Texas in five sets to advance to their 14th NCAA title match in school history.

After Texas went up two sets to none, Stanford came back to win in five sets behind play from seniors Foluke Akinradewo and Cynthia Barboza. It was the first time in the history of the NCAA tournament that a team came back to win after being down two sets to none in the National Semifinals. Stanford advanced to their third straight title match, while Texas, who had advanced to their first Final Four since 1995, finished their season at 29-4.

=== Penn State vs. Nebraska ===
Teams	Set 1	Set 2	Set 3	Set 4	Set 5
PSU	25	25	15	22	15
NEB	17	18	25	25	11

Penn State, unbeaten in both matches and individual sets, seemed to be easily heading to their second straight final after going up 2 sets to 0 on Nebraska in front of an NCAA record crowd of 17,430, mostly Husker fans. The Nittany Lions NCAA record of consecutive sets won stood at 111 before it being snapped by Nebraska.

Coming out of the break, Nebraska mounted a big comeback. The Huskers forced a game five off of Penn State. The Huskers, unbeaten at the Qwest Center with a 14–0 record and never having lost a match in the state of Nebraska in 96 matches, went up 10–8 in the decisive fifth set. However, AVCA National Player of the Year Nicole Fawcett served six straight points, which included a service ace, to swing the momentum to the Nittany Lions at 14–10. Nebraska fought off one match point before Megan Hodge crushed her 23rd kill of the night to finish the match and set up a rematch of the 2007 NCAA championship.

== National Championship recap: Penn State vs. Stanford ==
Teams	Set 1	Set 2	Set 3
PSU	25	26	25
STAN	20	24	23

For the first time in NCAA tournament history, the same two teams met for the national title in consecutive years. Stanford's senior class, appearing in their third straight title match, was attempting to win their first national title. A Stanford class had not gone through without winning at least one NCAA championship since the program won their first national championship in 1992. Penn State and Stanford met for the fourth time in the NCAA championship - all of which have occurred since 1997 - which is the most meetings between any two schools. Penn State and Stanford are the only two programs to appear in every NCAA tournament since the NCAA started to sponsor women's volleyball in 1981.

Stanford started the match on fire, going up 10-5, then 15-10 at the media timeout. However, Penn State went on a 15-5 run to close out the first set, 25-20. Both teams remained even in set 2, with a Hodge kill giving Penn State the narrow 15-14 lead heading into the media timeout.

The national championship was halted in set 2 for at least 10 minutes, though, after a scoring discrepancy. Penn State seemingly earned the point to go up 21-19 after a Nicole Fawcett kill, but the scoring table had a miscommunication, thinking Stanford had gotten the point and that it was 20-20. Despite both Penn State head coach Russ Rose and Stanford head coach John Dunning agreeing the score was, in fact, 21-19 in favor of Penn State, the scoring table did not adjust the score and replayed the point. Another scoring miscommunication took place once again later in set 2, but Penn State eventually prevailed, 26-24, to take the 2-0 lead to the match. The incident led the NCAA Volleyball panel to recommend a protocol for score discrepancies.

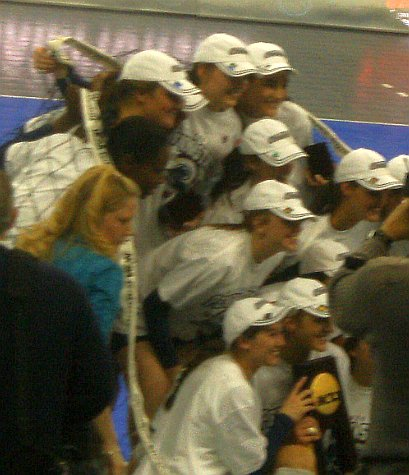
The 2008 Penn State volleyball team poses with the NCAA championship trophy after defeating Stanford University in the finals.

In what was the final set, Penn State eased up to the 21-17 lead. Two consecutive kills from Megan Hodge put Penn State just two points away from their second straight national title at 23-18. Stanford, however, managed to pull within one at 23-22 after four consecutive kills from Alix Klineman. Another Hodge kill halted the run to give Penn State two championship points at 24-22. After Stanford scored another kill to stave off one championship point, Penn State senior Nicole Fawcett sealed the set with a tip off of the Stanford block to take the national championship and the match. Penn State extended their NCAA record of consecutive matches won to 64 while Stanford's 16 match winning streak was snapped.

Stanford became the first team to ever lose in three consecutive title matches. Penn State joined USC from 2003 to become the only repeat champions to go undefeated, while also joining Long Beach State's 1998 team and Nebraska's 2000 team to be the only undefeated teams in NCAA history. The Nittany Lions joined USC's 2003 team and Nebraska's 2006 team as the only schools to be ranked #1 in the coaches poll for the entire season.

With the dominance Penn State showed throughout the 2008 season - going 114-2 in individual sets, 38-0 in matches, breaking the NCAA record for consecutive matches and sets won, being the first team in NCAA history to go through the regular season without losing a single set, leading the NCAA in blocks per set, and breaking the NCAA rally-scoring era record for team hitting percentage in a season (.390), some think Penn State could perhaps be the best team to ever play women's college volleyball.

Two of the best middle blockers in NCAA history ended their careers as well. Stanford senior Foluke Akinradewo broke the NCAA Division I all-time career hitting percentage, ending her career with a .443 overall percentage. Penn State senior Christa Harmotto finished her career second all time in NCAA history, hitting .433 for her career.
