= 1995 NCAA Division I women's volleyball tournament =

Volleyball competition

1995 NCAA women's Division I volleyball tournament
- 1995 NCAA Final Four logo
- Champions: Nebraska (1st title)
- Runner-up: Texas (2nd NCAA (3rd national) title match)
- Semifinalists: Stanford (9th Final Four); Michigan State (1st Final Four)
- Winning coach: Terry Pettit (1st title)
- Final Four All-Tournament Team: Allison Weston (Nebraska); Katie Crnich (Nebraska); Christy Johnson (Nebraska); Billie Winsett (Nebraska); Demetria Sance (Texas); Kristin Folkl (Stanford)

The 1995 NCAA Division I women's volleyball tournament began with 48 teams and ended on December 16, 1995, when Nebraska defeated Texas 3 games to 1 in the NCAA championship match.

Nebraska defeated Texas 11-15, 15-2, 15-7, 16-14. Nebraska was led by Katie Crnich and Billie Winsett who each had 25 kills. After losing its second match of the season to then-No. 1 Stanford, Nebraska reeled off 31 consecutive matches to claim the NCAA title and had the program's best season at 32-1 (.970%).

== Play-in games ==
November 19
Hofstra (NAC, 20-12)	3
Rider (NEC, 16-12)	0

November 21
UCF (TAAC, 31-9)	3
UMBC (Big South, 25-8)	0

November 25
Middle Tenn. (OVC, 31-6)	3
Princeton (Ivy, 29-3)	1

November 25
Northern Iowa (MVC, 27-1)	3
Valparaiso (Mid-Cont., 24-9)	0

n/a
Siena (MAAC, 26-5)	3
Colgate (Patriot, 19-8)	1

n/a
Marshall (Southern, 24-10)	3
Florida A&M (MEAC, 15-18)	0

== Records ==
Pacific Regional
Seed	School	Conference	Berth Type	Record
	Colorado	Big Eight	At-large	17-10
	Idaho	Big Sky	Automatic	27-4
	Iowa State	Big Eight	At-large	21-11
	Loyola Marymount	West Coast	Automatic	24-4
	North Texas	Southland	Automatic	24-9
	Northern Iowa	Missouri Valley	Automatic	28-1
	Notre Dame	Big East	Automatic	26-6
	Oral Roberts	Independent	At-large	27-2
	Pacific	Big West	At-large	21-8
	Stanford	Pac-10	Automatic	26-2
	USC	Pac-10	At-large	16-8
	Washington State	Pac-10	At-large	22-6

Central Regional
Seed	School	Conference	Berth Type	Record
	Ball State	Mid-American	Automatic	21-11
	George Mason	CAA	Automatic	20-10
	Georgia Tech	ACC	Automatic	28-6
	Indiana	Big Ten	At-large	20-13
	Loyola (IL)	Midwestern Collegiate	Automatic	27-6
	Maryland	ACC	At-large	21-9
	Miami (OH)	Mid-American	At-large	24-6
	Nebraska	Big Eight	Automatic	27-1
	Ohio State	Big Ten	At-large	21-7
	Penn State	Big Ten	At-large	26-7
	Siena	MAAC	Automatic	27-5
	UCLA	Pac-10	At-large	21-8

East Regional
Seed	School	Conference	Berth Type	Record
	Arkansas State	Sun Belt	Automatic	27-6
	Florida	SEC	Automatic	33-1
	George Washington	Atlantic 10	Automatic	29-5
	Georgia	SEC	At-large	20-8
	Hofstra	North Atlantic	Automatic	21-12
	Illinois	Big Ten	At-large	23-8
	Marshall	Southern	Automatic	25-10
	Middle Tennessee State	Ohio Valley	Automatic	32-6
	South Carolina	SEC	At-large	20-10
	Texas	Southwest	Automatic	24-6
	Texas A&M	Southwest	At-large	22-6
	Texas Tech	Southwest	At-large	20-11

Mountain Regional
Seed	School	Conference	Berth Type	Record
	Arizona State	Pac-10	At-large	18-7
	BYU	WAC	At-large	20-8
	Colorado State	WAC	At-large	21-10
	Hawaii	Big West	Automatic	29-0
	Houston	Southwest	At-large	17-13
	Long Beach State	Big West	At-large	21-9
	Louisville	Conference USA	At-large	28-5
	Michigan State	Big Ten	Automatic	31-2
	San Diego State	WAC	Automatic	26-4
	South Florida	Conference USA	Automatic	27-4
	UC Santa Barbara	Big West	At-large	25-8
	UCF	Trans America	Automatic	32-9

== Brackets ==
=== Pacific regional ===
First round
Colorado	0
Northern Iowa	3
Southern California	3
North Texas	0
Loyola Marymount	2
Oral Roberts	3
Idaho	0
Iowa State	3

Second round
1	Stanford	3
Northern Iowa	0
Southern California	3
4	Pacific	0
3	Washington State	0
Oral Roberts	3
Iowa State	1
2	Notre Dame	3

Regional semifinal
1	Stanford	3
Southern California	0
Oral Roberts	3
2	Notre Dame	0

Regional final
1	Stanford	3
Oral Roberts	0

=== East regional ===
First round
Arkansas State	2
Texas Tech	3
South Carolina	3
Hofstra	0
Georgia	3
Marshall	0
Middle Tennessee	0
George Washington	3

Second round
1	Florida	3
Texas Tech	2
South Carolina	0
4	Texas A&M	3
3	Illinois	3
Georgia	1
George Washington	0
2	Texas	3

Regional semifinal
1	Florida	3
4	Texas A&M	0
3	Illinois	0
2	Texas	3

Regional final
1	Florida	2
2	Texas	3

=== Central regional ===
First round
George Mason	3
Indiana	0
Georgia Tech	3
Siena	0
Maryland	3
Miami (Oh.)	0
Ball State	3
Loyola (Ill.)	0

Second round
1	Nebraska	3
George Mason	0
Georgia Tech	0
4	Penn State	3
3	Ohio State	3
Maryland	1
Ball State	0
2	UCLA	3

Regional semifinal
1	Nebraska	3
4	Penn State	1
3	Ohio State	0
2	UCLA	3

Regional final
1	Nebraska	3
2	UCLA	0

=== Mountain regional ===
First round
Louisville	3
Central Florida	1
UCSB	3
South Florida	0
Long Beach State	3
Colorado State	0
Houston	0
BYU	3

Second round
1	Hawaiʻi	3
Louisville	0
UCSB	2
4	Arizona State	3
3	San Diego State	3
Long Beach State	1
BYU	0
2	Michigan State	3

Regional semifinal
1	Hawaiʻi	3
4	Arizona State	1
3	San Diego State	0
2	Michigan State	3

Regional final
1	Hawaiʻi	2
2	Michigan State	3

== Final Four - Mullins Center, Amherst, Massachusetts ==
National semifinals
1	Stanford	2
2	Texas	3
1	Nebraska	3
2	Michigan State	2

National championship
2	Texas	1
1	Nebraska	3
