= Angela McGinnis =

American volleyball player (born 1986)

Personal information
- Nationality: American
- Born: November 3, 1986 (age 39)
- Height: 5 ft 11 in (180 cm)
- Weight: 159 lb (72 kg)
- Spike: 119 in (301 cm)
- Block: 118 in (299 cm)

Volleyball information
- Number: 4 (national team)

Career
Years	Teams
2009	Igtisadchi Baku VC

National team
2009	United States

Angela McGinnis (born November 3, 1986) is an American female volleyball player. She was part of the United States women's national volleyball team.

She participated in the 2009 FIVB Volleyball World Grand Prix. On the club level she played for Igtisadchi Baku VC in 2009.
