= Tracy Stalls =

American volleyball player (born 1984)

Personal information
- Nationality: American
- Born: June 12, 1984 (age 42)
- Height: 6 ft 4 in (193 cm)
- Weight: 170 lb (77 kg)
- Spike: 124 in (315 cm)
- Block: 121 in (308 cm)

Volleyball information
- Number: 13 (National Team)

Career
- Years: Team
- 2009: Eczacibasi Sports Club

National team
- Years: Team
- 2009: United States
Medal record
Women's volleyball
Representing the United States
Pan American Games
Bronze medal – third place	2003 Santo Domingo	Team

Tracy Stalls (born June 12, 1984) is an American female volleyball player. She was part of the United States women's national volleyball team. On the club level she played for Eczacibasi Sports Club in 2009.

== See also ==
- it:Tracy Stalls
