= 2015 NCAA Division I women's volleyball tournament =

Volleyball competition

2015 NCAA women's Division I volleyball tournament
- 2015 Division I Championship
- Finals site: CenturyLink Center Omaha; Omaha, Nebraska
- Champions: Nebraska (4th title)
- Runner-up: Texas (5th title match)
- Semifinalists: Kansas (1st Final Four); Minnesota (4th Final Four)
- Winning coach: John Cook (3rd title)
- Most outstanding player: Mikaela Foecke (Nebraska)
- Final Four All-Tournament Team: Yaasmeen Bedart-Ghani (Texas); Kelly Hunter (Nebraska); Amy Neal (Texas); Kelsie Payne (Kansas); Amber Rolfzen (Nebraska); Justine Wong-Orantes (Nebraska)

The 2015 NCAA Division I women's volleyball tournament began December 4, 2015 and concluded on December 19 at CenturyLink Center, now known as CHI Health Center, in Omaha, Nebraska. The tournament field was determined on November 29, 2015. Nebraska swept Texas in the final to claim their fourth national championship.

== Qualifying teams ==
The champions of the NCAA's 32 conferences qualified automatically. Twenty-two conferences held tournaments, while the other ten awarded their automatic bid on the basis of being the league's regular-season champion. Those that did not hold tournaments were the American Athletic, Atlantic Coast, Big 12, Big Ten, Big West, Ivy League, Mountain West, Pac-12, Southeastern and West Coast Conferences. The other 32 bids were apportioned on an at-large basis. Only the top 16 teams overall were seeded.

=== Records ===
San Diego Regional
Seed	School	Conference	Berth Type	RPI	Record
	Cleveland State	Horizon	Automatic	67	26-6
	Coastal Carolina	Big South	Automatic	83	25-4
	Colorado State	Mountain West	Automatic	20	26-3
16	Creighton	Big East	Automatic	15	25-8
	Furman	SoCon	Automatic	84	21-8
9	Kansas	Big 12	At-Large	8	26-2
	Loyola Marymount	West Coast	At-Large	27	22-8
	Missouri	SEC	At-Large	18	26-5
	Missouri State	Missouri Valley	Automatic	34	24-10
	New Mexico State	WAC	Automatic	61	28-5
	North Carolina	ACC	At-Large	24	20-9
	Northern Arizona	Big Sky	Automatic	33	28-4
	San Diego	West Coast	At-Large	30	21-9
8	Stanford	Pac-12	At-Large	12	22-6
	UNC-Wilmington	CAA	Automatic	58	24-7
1	USC	Pac-12	Automatic/Split	3	30-2

Austin Regional
Seed	School	Conference	Berth Type	RPI	Record
	Arizona State	Pac-12	At-Large	39	19-12
	Fairfield	MAAC	Automatic	164	21-9
11	Florida	SEC	At-Large	7	22-6
	Florida State	ACC	At-Large	25	24-7
	Iowa State	Big 12	At-Large	23	18-10
	Lipscomb	Atlantic Sun	Automatic	50	23-8
	Miami (FL)	ACC	At-Large	38	21-9
	Michigan	Big Ten	At-Large	31	19-12
	New Hampshire	America East	Automatic	143	21-8
	Oregon	Pac-12	At-Large	48	16-13
	Purdue	Big Ten	At-Large	35	22-9
	Santa Clara	West Coast	At-Large	37	22-8
	SMU	American	Automatic	32	27-5
3	Texas	Big 12	Automatic	1	25-2
14	UCLA	Pac-12	At-Large	11	23-7
6	Wisconsin	Big Ten	At-Large	5	24-6

Lexington Regional
Seed	School	Conference	Berth Type	RPI	Record
	American	Patriot	Automatic	77	27-6
	Arizona	Pac-12	At-Large	46	19-13
	Arkansas State	Sun Belt	Automatic	16	28-1
13	BYU	West Coast	Automatic	14	26-3
	Denver	The Summit League	Automatic	87	27-7
	Harvard	Ivy League	Automatic	144	15-10
	Kansas State	Big 12	At-Large	51	17-11
	Kentucky	SEC	At-Large	21	21-9
	Michigan State	Big Ten	At-Large	54	18-13
4	Nebraska	Big Ten	At-Large	4	26-4
	Ohio	MAC	Automatic	52	25-7
12	Ohio State	Big Ten	At-Large	17	23-9
	Robert Morris	NEC	Automatic	203	19-12
5	Washington	Pac-12	Automatic/Split	9	28-2
	Western Kentucky	Conference USA	Automatic	13	31-3
	Wichita State	Missouri Valley	At-Large	28	26-8

Des Moines Regional
Seed	School	Conference	Berth Type	RPI	Record
	Belmont	Ohio Valley	Automatic	169	17-14
	Dayton	Atlantic 10	Automatic	22	26-5
	Hawaiʻi	Big West	Automatic	26	26-1
	Howard	MEAC	Automatic	228	18-13
	Illinois	Big Ten	At-Large	29	19-12
	Jackson State	SWAC	Automatic	310	15-21
15	Louisville	ACC	Automatic	19	24-6
	Marquette	Big East	At-Large	36	21-11
2	Minnesota	Big Ten	Automatic	2	26-4
	Northern Iowa	Missouri Valley	At-Large	45	19-14
7	Penn State	Big Ten	At-Large	10	26-5
	Southern Illinois	Missouri Valley	At-Large	40	23-9
	TCU	Big 12	At-Large	49	19-9
10	Texas A&M	SEC	Automatic	6	23-6
	Texas A&M-Corpus Christi	Southland	Automatic	65	31-4
	Villanova	Big East	At-Large	41	25-8

== Bracket ==
The first two rounds were held on campus sites (the home court of the seeded team, with the exception of Creighton. Due to basketball events already being scheduled in Omaha, the Bluejays had to head to Chapel Hill, North Carolina to play the first and second round.). Regional semifinals and finals were held at pre-determined sites. In 2015, those sites were hosted by the University of Texas at Austin, University of Northern Iowa, University of Kentucky, and University of San Diego. Unlike the NCAA basketball tournament, where teams cannot be placed into regionals that they host, the selectors in the volleyball tournament were required to place qualifying teams in their 'home' regionals, in order to reduce travel costs.

=== San Diego Regional ===
First round
1	USC	3
Cleveland State	1
Los Angeles, CA
Northern Arizona	0
San Diego	3
16	Creighton	3
Coastal Carolina	1
Chapel Hill, NC
North Carolina	3
UNC Wilmington	0
8	Stanford	3
New Mexico State	0
Stanford, CA
Loyola Marymount	3
Colorado State	1
9	Kansas	3
Furman	0
Lawrence, KS
Missouri State	1
Missouri	3

Second round
1	USC	3
San Diego	0
16	Creighton	3
North Carolina	1
8	Stanford	0
Loyola Marymount	3
9	Kansas	3
Missouri	0

Regional semifinals
1	USC	3
16	Creighton	1
Loyola Marymount	1
9	Kansas	3

Regional finals
1	USC	2
9	Kansas	3

=== Lexington Regional ===
First round
4	Nebraska	3
Harvard	1
Lincoln, NE
Wichita State	3
Kansas State	1
13	BYU	3
Ohio	1
Provo, UT
Arizona	0
Western Kentucky	3
5	Washington	3
Denver	0
Seattle, WA
Michigan State	3
Arkansas State	0
12	Ohio State	3
Robert Morris	0
Columbus, OH
Kentucky	0
American	3

Second round
4	Nebraska	3
Wichita State	0
13	BYU	3
Western Kentucky	0
5	Washington	3
Michigan State	1
12	Ohio State	3
American	0

Regional semifinals
4	Nebraska	3
13	BYU	0
5	Washington	3
12	Ohio State	2

Regional finals
4	Nebraska	3
5	Washington	1

=== Austin Regional ===
First round
3	Texas	3
Fairfield	0
Austin, TX
SMU	1
Purdue	3
14	UCLA	3
Lipscomb	0
Los Angeles, CA
Michigan	3
Santa Clara	1
6	Wisconsin	3
Oregon	1
Madison, WI
Iowa State	3
Miami (FL)	0
11	Florida	3
New Hampshire	0
Gainesville, FL
Arizona State	0
Florida State	3

Second round
3	Texas	3
Purdue	1
14	UCLA	3
Michigan	2
6	Wisconsin	3
Iowa State	0
11	Florida	3
Florida State	1

Regional semifinals
3	Texas	3
14	UCLA	1
6	Wisconsin	2
11	Florida	3

Regional finals
3	Texas	3
11	Florida	2

=== Des Moines Regional ===
First round
2	Minnesota	3
Jackson State	0
Minneapolis, MN
Marquette	3
Northern Iowa	2
15	Louisville	3
Belmont	1
Louisville, KY
Southern Illinois	0
Illinois	3
7	Penn State	3
Howard	0
University Park, PA
Dayton	3
Villanova	1
10	Texas A&M	3
Texas A&M-Corpus Christi	0
College Station, TX
Hawaiʻi	3
TCU	2

Second round
2	Minnesota	3
Marquette	0
15	Louisville	1
Illinois	3
7	Penn State	3
Dayton	1
10	Texas A&M	0
Hawaiʻi	3

Regional semifinals
2	Minnesota	3
Illinois	0
7	Penn State	0
Hawaiʻi	3

Regional finals
2	Minnesota	3
Hawaiʻi	1

== Final Four ==
National Semifinals
9	Kansas	1
4	Nebraska	3
2	Minnesota	1
3	Texas	3

National Championship
4	Nebraska	3
3	Texas	0

Final Four All-Tournament Team:

- Mikaela Foecke - Nebraska (Most Outstanding Player)
- Amber Rolfzen - Nebraska
- Justine Wong-Orantes - Nebraska
- Kelly Hunter - Nebraska
- Amy Neal - Texas
- Yaasmeen Bedart-Ghani - Texas
- Kelsie Payne - Kansas

== Record by conference ==
Conference	# of Bids	Record	Win %	R32	S16	E8	F4	CM	NC
Big Ten	9	21–8	.724	9	6	2	2	1	1
Big 12	5	10–5	.667	3	2	2	2	1	–
Pac-12	7	9–7	.563	4	3	2	–	–	–
Southeastern	4	5–4	.556	3	1	1	–	–	–
Big West	1	3–1	.750	1	1	1	–	–	–
West Coast	4	5–4	.556	3	2	–	–	–	–
Big East	3	3–3	.500	2	1	–	–	–	–
Atlantic 10	1	1–1	.500	1	–	–	–	–	–
Conference USA	1	1–1	.500	1	–	–	–	–	–
Patriot	1	1–1	.500	1	–	–	–	–	–
Atlantic Coast	4	3–4	.429	3	–	–	–	–	–
Missouri Valley	4	1–4	.200	1	–	–	–	–	–
Other	20	0–20	.000	–	–	–	–	–	–

The columns R32, S16, E8, F4, CM, and NC respectively stand for the Round of 32, Sweet Sixteen, Elite Eight, Final Four, Championship Match, and National Champion.

== Television ==
All first and second-round games were broadcast on local networks or digital feeds [Longhorn Network (Austin), SEC+ (College Station, Gainesville), BYUtv (Provo), ESPN3 (Chapel Hill, Lawrence, Louisville, College Station- non-SEC, Austin- non-Texas, Gainesville- non-SEC), TheW.tv (Provo- non BYU), P12 Digital feeds (Los Angeles, Stanford, Seattle), and Big Ten Digital (Minneapolis, University Park, Madison, Lincoln]. The Regional Finals onward will all be on ESPN Networks. ESPN3 will carry all the Regional Semis except one game in San Diego which will be shown on ESPNU. ESPNU will carry all the regional finals. ESPN2 will carry the National Semifinals and Final.

- Beth Mowins & Karch Kiraly (Austin), & Holly Rowe (Omaha)
- Tiffany Greene & Missy Whittemore (Lexington)
- Paul Sunderland & Dain Blanton (San Diego)
- Cara Capuano & Maria Taylor (Des Moines)
