= Florida Gators women's volleyball =

Women's volleyball team of the University of Florida

- University: University of Florida
- Head coach: Ryan Theis (1st season)
- Conference: SEC
- Location: Gainesville, Florida, US
- Home arena: Exactech Arena at Stephen C. O'Connell Center (capacity: 10,136)
- Nickname: Florida Gators
- Colors: Orange and blue

AIAW/NCAA tournament runner-up
- 2003, 2017

AIAW/NCAA tournament semifinal
- 1992, 1993, 1996, 1997, 1998, 2002, 2003, 2017

AIAW/NCAA tournament appearance
- 1987, 1991, 1992, 1993, 1994, 1995, 1996, 1997, 1998, 1999, 2000, 2001, 2002, 2003, 2004, 2005, 2006, 2007, 2008, 2009, 2010, 2011, 2012, 2013, 2014, 2015, 2016, 2017, 2018, 2019, 2020, 2021, 2022, 2023, 2024, 2025

Conference tournament champion
- 1992, 1993, 1994, 1995, 1996, 1998, 1999, 2000, 2001, 2002, 2003, 2004, 2005

Conference regular season champion
- 1991, 1992, 1993, 1994, 1995, 1996, 1997, 1998, 1999, 2000, 2001, 2002, 2003, 2004, 2005, 2006, 2007, 2008, 2010, 2012, 2014, 2016, 2017, 2019, 2022, 2026

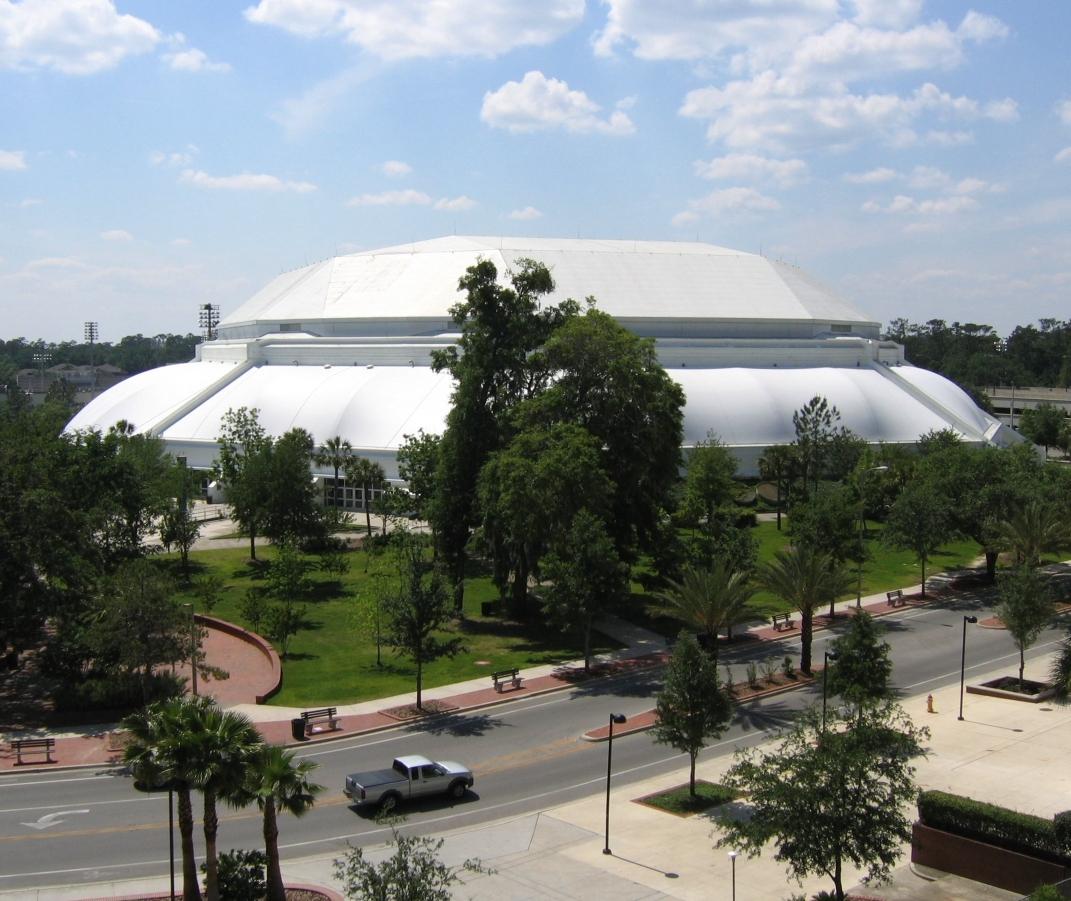
The O'Connell Center, a multi-purpose sports facility located on the University of Florida campus, is the home court of the Florida Gators volleyball team.

The Florida Gators women's volleyball team represents the University of Florida in the sport of volleyball. The Gators compete in Division I of the National Collegiate Athletic Association (NCAA) and the Southeastern Conference (SEC). The Gators play their home matches in the O'Connell Center on the university's Gainesville, Florida campus, and are currently led by head coach Ryan Theis.

== History ==
The University of Florida's athletic department, the University Athletic Association, authorized the first intercollegiate varsity women's volleyball team to begin play in the fall of 1984. Marilyn McReavy was the Gators' first head coach, and she led the Gators volleyball team for seven seasons from 1984 to 1990. McReavy's Gators compiled an overall win–loss record of 156–100 (.609), and a Southeastern Conference (SEC) record of 26–20 (.565). Her best SEC finish was second place in 1988, and her 1987 team was the only one that qualified for the NCAA tournament. McReavy resigned after a 15–16 performance in 1990.

Coach Mary Wise was hired to replace Marilyn McReavy in 1991. In their first year under Wise, the Gators won the SEC regular season championship, sharing it with the LSU Tigers volleyball team.

In 1992, Florida made its first ever NCAA Final Four appearance, where they lost in the semifinals to eventual national runner-up UCLA 15–12, 15–12, 15–10.

In 1993, Wise became the first Division I female head coach to guide her team to more than one final four. In 1996, the Gators made the trip to their third final four in five years, losing to Hawaiʻi in the semifinals. Wise was named the American Volleyball Coaches Association (AVCA) Division I National Coach of the Year.

In 1997, the Gators appeared in the final four once again, being swept by Penn State in the semifinals. The roster consisted of a young squad, with only three seniors on the team.

The Gators made their third consecutive final four in 1998, where they again lost in the semifinals, to eventual national champion and undefeated Long Beach State, 15–2, 15–8, 15–10.

In 2002, Florida made their first final four appearance since 1998, defeating Temple in the Sweet 16 and Penn State in the Elite Eight, before falling to eventual national champion Southern California in the semifinals.

After being 0-for-6 in previous NCAA Final Four semifinals, Florida broke through in 2003, by defeating Hawaii in the semis, 30–28, 30–28, 23–30, 30–28. Appearing in their first NCAA title match in school history, the Gators lost to undefeated Southern California in four sets, 25–30, 30–27, 30–19, 30–26. Wise became the first Division I female head coach to coach in a championship match. In addition, Florida set a then-NCAA record of 105 straight games won during the 2003 season.

The Florida Gators opened the 2017 season, beating #1 Texas and #5 Nebraska in the opening weekend. They would eventually become the #1-ranked team for the first time since 2010. The Gators finished the season 30–2 and reached their second national championship game, falling to Nebraska 3–1. Rhamat Alhassan (1st Team), Carli Snyder (2nd Team), Shainah Joseph (2nd Team), and Rachael Kramer (3rd Team) would give Florida their highest total class of All-Americans in a single year in school history. Additionally, Mary Wise garnered the 2017 AVCA Coach of the Year for the third time, the second-highest total in the award's history.

In 2023, the program's attendance record was set at 10,323 in attendance at the O'Connell Center when the 3rd-ranked Gators played #1 Wisconsin. This also set the record for the highest-attended volleyball match hosted by an SEC school and the highest on-campus volleyball match in the state of Florida.

On February 17, 2025, former assistant coach Ryan Theis was hired to replace Mary Wise as head coach after 6 seasons at Ohio and 11 seasons at Marquette.

== Year-by-year results ==
Year	Head Coach	Overall record	Conference record	Conference standing	Postseason
(Southeastern Conference) (1984–present)
1984	Marilyn McReavy	16–16	1–5	5th	–
1985	Marilyn McReavy	33–13	4–2	3rd	–
1986	Marilyn McReavy	15–23	4–2	3rd	–
1987	Marilyn McReavy	37–6	5–2	3rd	NCAA Regional semifinal
1988	Marilyn McReavy	23–14	5–2	2nd	–
1989	Marilyn McReavy	17–12	3–5	6th	–
1990	Marilyn McReavy	15–16	4–4	3rd	–
1991	Mary Wise	35–5	13–1	1st	NCAA Regional Final
1992	Mary Wise	34–2	14–0	1st	NCAA Final Four
1993	Mary Wise	33–4	14–0	1st	NCAA Final Four
1994	Mary Wise	28–6	13–1	1st	NCAA Regional semifinal
1995	Mary Wise	35–2	14–0	1st	NCAA Regional Final
1996	Mary Wise	37–2	14–0	1st	NCAA Final Four
1997	Mary Wise	34–4	14–0	1st	NCAA Final Four
1998	Mary Wise	35–3	14–0	1st	NCAA Final Four
1999	Mary Wise	33–3	14–0	1st	NCAA Regional Final
2000	Mary Wise	29–5	14–0	1st	NCAA Regional semifinal
2001	Mary Wise	28–2	14–0	1st	NCAA Regional Final
2002	Mary Wise	34–3	16–0	1st	NCAA Final Four
2003	Mary Wise	36–2	16–0	1st	NCAA Runners-Up
2004	Mary Wise	28–5	15–1	1st	NCAA Second Round
2005	Mary Wise	33–3	15–1	1st	NCAA Regional Final
2006	Mary Wise	30–3	19–1	1st	NCAA Regional Final
2007	Mary Wise	29–3	19–1	1st	NCAA Regional semifinal
2008	Mary Wise	27–4	18–2	1st	NCAA Regional semifinal
2009	Mary Wise	26-7	16–4	3rd	NCAA Regional semifinal
2010	Mary Wise	29–2	20–0	1st	NCAA Regional semifinal
2011	Mary Wise	27–6	17–3	2nd	NCAA Regional Final
2012	Mary Wise	27–5	19–1	1st	NCAA Regional semifinal
2013	Mary Wise	28–4	16–2	2nd	NCAA Second Round
2014	Mary Wise	28–4	18–0	1st	NCAA Regional Final
2015	Mary Wise	25–7	13–5	4th	NCAA Regional Final
2016	Mary Wise	27–4	16–2	1st	NCAA Second Round
2017	Mary Wise	30–2	17–1	1st	NCAA Runners-Up
2018	Mary Wise	26–7	15–3	3rd	NCAA Regional semifinal
2019	Mary Wise	27–5	16–2	1st	NCAA Regional semifinal
2020	Mary Wise	21–4	19–3	2nd	NCAA Regional Final
2021	Mary Wise	22–9	14–4	3rd	NCAA Regional Semifinal
2022	Mary Wise	25–6	15–3	1st	NCAA Regional Semifinal
2023	Mary Wise	19–10	10–8	5th	NCAA Second Round
2024	Mary Wise	23–8	11–5	3rd	NCAA Regional Semifinal
2025	Ryan Theis	16–12	9–6	5th	NCAA 2nd Round
Total		1160–263	557–82		

== Southeastern Conference ==
=== Southeastern Conference Players of the Year ===
Florida has 12 players selected SEC player of the year for a total of 18 awards.

- Gudula Staub, 1992
- Aycan Gokberk, 1993, 1995
- Jenny Wood, 1996
- Nina Foster, 1997
- Jenny Manz, 1998, 1999
- Nicole McCray, 2000
- Aury Cruz, 2001, 2002, 2003
- Jane Collymore, 2004, 2005
- Angie McGinnis, 2006, 2007
- Kelly Murphy, 2010
- Chloe Mann, 2012
- Alex Holston, 2014
- Rhamat Alhassan, 2017

=== Southeastern Conference Freshman of the Year ===
Florida has 6 recipients of the Freshman of the Year award.

- Aury Cruz, 2000
- Angie McGinnis, 2004
- Kelly Murphy, 2008
- Ziva Recek, 2012
- Rhamat Alhassan, 2014
- Alexis Stucky, 2022
- Jaela Auguste, 2024

=== Southeastern Conference Libero of the Year ===
Florida has 1 recipient of the Libero of the Year award. The award for Libero of the Year began in 2009.

- Taylor Unroe, 2013

=== Southeastern Conference Coach of the Year ===
Florida has 1 recipient of the Coach of the Year award for a total of 11 awards.

- Mary Wise, 1995, 1996, 1998, 1999, 2000, 2001, 2002, 2007, 2010, 2012, 2014, 2017

=== Southeastern Conference Scholar Athlete of the Year ===
Florida has 3 recipients of the Scholar Athlete of the Year award. The award for Scholar Athlete of the Year began in 2003

- Kelsey Bowers, 2008
- Kristy Jaeckel, 2011
- Holly Pole, 2014

=== Southeastern Conference Defensive Player of the Year ===
Florida has 1 recipient of the Defensive Player of the Year award. The award for Defensive Player of the Year began in 2003 and ended in 2008

- Elyse Cusack, 2006

== American Volleyball Coaches Association ==
=== All-Americans ===
Florida has 32 AVCA All-America selections, tenth all-time in NCAA Division I, and 13 First Team selections, tied for tenth all-time.

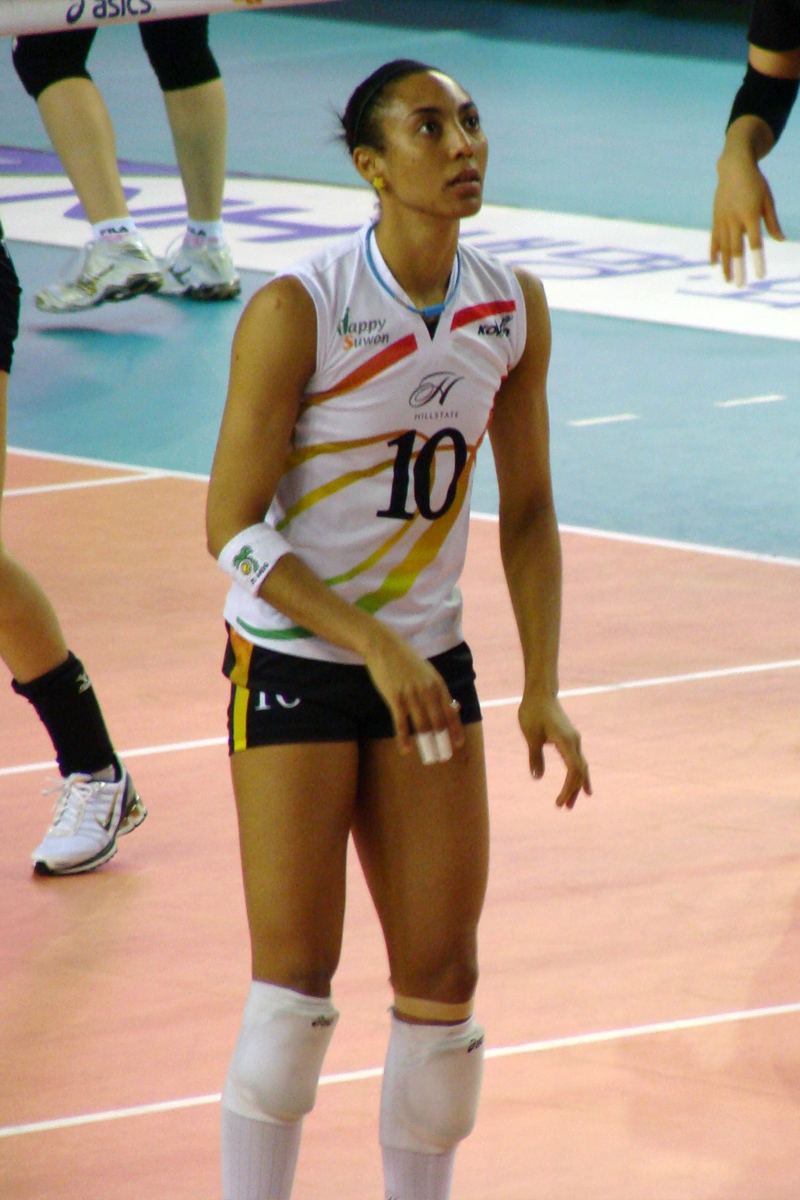
Áurea Cruz

- Heidi Anderson, 1992
- Rhamat Alhassan, 2015, 2017
- Lauren Bledsoe, 2010
- T'ara Ceasar, 2020
- Jane Collymore, 2004, 2005
- Aury Cruz, 2001, 2002, 2003
- Erin Fleming, 2010
- Lauren Forte, 2020
- Nina Foster, 1997
- Aycan Gokberk, 1993, 1995
- Marcie Hampton, 2007
- Benavia Jenkins, 2001, 2002, 2003
- Shainah Joseph, 2017
- Jenny Manz, 1998, 1999
- Amber McCray, 2006
- Nicole McCray, 2002
- Angie McGinnis, 2005, 2006, 2007
- Ashley Mullis, 1995
- Kelly Murphy, 2008, 2009, 2010, 2011
- Callie Rivers, 2010
- Aurymar Rodriguez, 1996
- Jennifer Sanchez, 1998
- Carli Snyder, 2017
- Gudula Staub, 1991, 1992
- Sherri Williams, 2003
- Jenny Wood, 1996

=== National awards ===
==== Major awards ====
- Mary Wise, National Coach of the Year: 1992, 1996, 2017
- Kelly Murphy, National Freshman of the Year: 2008
- Ziva Recek, National Freshman of the Year: 2012

==== Player of the Week ====
Nine players have earned twelve AVCA Division I National Player of the Week award:

- Aycan Gokberk (Sept. 11, 1995 and Oct. 30, 1995)
- Nina Foster (Sept. 1, 1997)
- Jenny Manz (Sept. 7, 1998)
- Heather Wright (Nov. 23, 1998)
- Nicole McCray (Sept. 4, 2000)
- Elyse Cusack (Nov. 6, 2006)
- Kelly Murphy (Sept. 30, 2008; Aug. 21, 2010; and Sept. 20 2011)
- Kristy Jaeckel (Oct. 4, 2011)
- Rhamat Alhassan (Sept. 16, 2014)
- Rachael Kramer (Aug. 29th, 2017)

== See also ==
- Florida Gators
- History of the University of Florida
- List of University of Florida Athletic Hall of Fame members
- List of University of Florida Olympians
- University Athletic Association
- List of NCAA Division I women's volleyball programs
