= 2013 NCAA Division I women's volleyball tournament =

Volleyball competition

2013 NCAA women's Division I volleyball tournament
- 2013 Division I Championship
- Champions: Penn State (6th title)
- Runner-up: Wisconsin (2nd title match)
- Semifinalists: Texas (9th Final Four); Washington (4th Final Four)
- Winning coach: Russ Rose (6th title)
- Most outstanding player: Micha Hancock (Penn State)
- Final Four All-Tournament Team: Deja McClendon (Penn State); Ariel Scott (Penn State); Katie Slay (Penn State); Lauren Carlini (Wisconsin); Deme Morales (Wisconsin); Krista Vansant (Washington)

The 2013 NCAA Division I women's volleyball tournament began on December 5, 2013 and ended on December 21, 2013 at KeyArena in Seattle, Washington. The NCAA selection show was televised on Sunday, December 1, 2013.

== Qualifying teams ==
The champions of the NCAA's 32 conferences qualify automatically. Twenty-two conferences hold tournaments, while the other ten award their automatic bid on the basis of being the league's regular-season champion. Those that do not hold tournaments are the Atlantic Coast, American Athletic, Big 12, Big West, Big Ten, Ivy League, Mountain West, Pac-12, Southeastern and West Coast Conferences. The other 32 bids are apportioned on an at-large basis. Only the top 16 teams overall are seeded.

=== Records ===
Lincoln Regional
Seed	School	Conference	Berth Type	RPI	Record
	American	Patriot	Automatic	45	32-2
	Arizona	Pac-12	At-Large	24	20-12
	College of Charleston	Colonial Athletic	Automatic	65	25-5
16	Duke	Atlantic Coast	Automatic	12	27-4
	Fairfield	Metro Atlantic	Automatic	154	19-12
	Georgia	Southeastern	At-Large	32	22-9
	Miami	Atlantic Coast	At-Large	51	19-11
8	Nebraska	Big Ten	At-Large	9	23-6
	New Mexico State	Western Athletic	Automatic	91	22-10
	Oregon	Pac-12	At-Large	25	19-11
9	San Diego	West Coast	Automatic	14	24-3
1	Texas	Big 12	Automatic	2	23-2
	Texas A&M	Southeastern	At-Large	31	18-11
	Texas State	Sun Belt	Automatic	104	24-12
	UC Santa Barbara	Big West	Automatic	60	18-10
	UTSA	Conference USA	Automatic	46	24-7

Los Angeles Regional
Seed	School	Conference	Berth Type	RPI	Record
	Alabama State	Southwestern Athletic	Automatic	278	25-15
	Arizona State	Pac-12	At-Large	49	19-13
	Arkansas	Southeastern	At-Large	36	16-13
	BYU	West Coast	At-Large	29	22-6
	Cal State Northridge	Big West	At-Large	41	23-6
	Colorado State	Mountain West	Automatic	21	28-1
	Creighton	Big East	At-Large	16	22-8
11	Hawaii	Big West	At-Large	17	24-4
	Idaho State	Big Sky	Automatic	102	23-11
14	Kansas	Big 12	At-Large	13	23-7
	LSU	Southeastern	At-Large	30	18-12
	Michigan	Big Ten	At-Large	33	18-13
	New Hampshire	America East	Automatic	206	20-12
6	USC	Pac-12	At-Large	7	26-5
3	Washington	Pac-12	Automatic	5	26-2
	Wichita State	Missouri Valley	Automatic	35	28-6

Champaign Regional
Seed	School	Conference	Berth Type	RPI	Record
	California	Pac-12	At-Large	38	17-12
	Central Arkansas	Southland	Automatic	44	29-3
5	Florida	Southeastern	At-Large	3	27-3
	Florida State	Atlantic Coast	At-Large	19	24-7
	Georgia Southern	Southern	Automatic	73	28-5
13	Illinois	Big Ten	At-Large	20	16-14
	IUPUI	Summit	Automatic	114	19-13
	Jacksonville	Atlantic Sun	Automatic	89	30-3
	Louisville	American Athletic	Automatic	42	23-7
	Marquette	Big East	Automatic	8	25-5
	Milwaukee	Horizon	Automatic	77	18-10
4	Missouri	Southeastern	Automatic	4	34-0
	Morehead State	Ohio Valley	Automatic	95	27-7
	North Carolina	Atlantic Coast	At-Large	22	27-4
	Purdue	Big Ten	At-Large	27	20-11
12	Wisconsin	Big Ten	At-Large	15	23-9

Lexington Regional
Seed	School	Conference	Berth Type	RPI	Record
	Alabama	Southeastern	At-Large	34	24-9
	Colorado	Pac-12	At-Large	48	17-13
	Duquesne	Atlantic 10	Automatic	93	20-9
	Hampton	Mid-Eastern Athletic	Automatic	192	19-10
	Iowa State	Big 12	At-Large	23	18-9
15	Kentucky	Southeastern	At-Large	10	21-8
	LIU-Brooklyn	Northeast	Automatic	88	23-7
	Michigan State	Big Ten	At-Large	28	21-11
10	Minnesota	Big Ten	At-Large	11	27-6
	Ohio	Mid-American	Automatic	40	27-5
	Oklahoma	Big 12	At-Large	18	23-7
2	Penn State	Big Ten	Automatic	1	28-2
	Radford	Big South	Automatic	157	25-9
7	Stanford	Pac-12	At-Large	6	24-5
	Utah	Pac-12	At-Large	26	20-12
	Yale	Ivy League	Automatic	39	20-4

== Bracket ==
The first two rounds were held on campus sites (the home court of the seeded team). Regional semifinals and finals were held at pre-determined sites. In 2013, those sites were hosted by Nebraska, Illinois, USC, and Kentucky, all of whom made the tournament and hosted in the first two rounds. Unlike the NCAA basketball tournament, where teams cannot be placed into regionals that they host, the selectors in the volleyball tournament were required to place qualifying teams in their 'home' regionals, in order to reduce travel costs.

=== Lincoln, Nebraska Regional ===
First round
1	Texas	3
Texas State	0
Austin, TX
UTSA	0
Texas A&M	3
Georgia	0
American	3
Durham, NC
16	Duke	3
Charleston	1
9	San Diego	3
UC Santa Barbara	0
San Diego, CA
New Mexico State	0
Arizona	3
Oregon	3
Miami	0
Lincoln, NE
8	Nebraska	3
Fairfield	0

Second round
1	Texas	3
Texas A&M	1
American	3
16	Duke	0
9	San Diego	3
Arizona	0
Oregon	0
8	Nebraska	3

Regional semifinals
1	Texas	3
American	1
9	San Diego	0
8	Nebraska	3

Regional finals
1	Texas	3
8	Nebraska	0

=== Champaign, Illinois Regional ===
First round
5	Florida	3
Jacksonville	0
Gainesville, FL
Georgia Southern	0
Florida State	3
North Carolina	0
California	3
Madison, WI
12	Wisconsin	3
Milwaukee	0
13	Illinois	3
Morehead State	0
Champaign, IL
Louisville	0
Marquette	3
Purdue	3
Central Arkansas	0
Columbia, MO
4	Missouri	3
IUPUI	0

Second round
5	Florida	2
Florida State	3
California	0
12	Wisconsin	3
13	Illinois	3
Marquette	1
Purdue	3
4	Missouri	1

Regional semifinals
Florida State	1
12	Wisconsin	3
13	Illinois	0
Purdue	3

Regional finals
12	Wisconsin	3
Purdue	1

=== Los Angeles, California Regional ===
First round
3	Washington	3
Alabama State	0
Seattle, WA
LSU	3
Michigan	2
Creighton	3
Arkansas	1
Lawrence, KS
14	Kansas	3
Wichita State	1
11	Hawaii	3
Idaho State	1
Honolulu, HI
Arizona State	2
BYU	3
Colorado State	2
Cal State Northridge	3
Los Angeles, CA
6	USC	3
New Hampshire	0

Second round
3	Washington	3
LSU	1
Creighton	1
14	Kansas	3
11	Hawaii	0
BYU	3
Cal State Northridge	0
6	USC	3

Regional semifinals
3	Washington	3
14	Kansas	0
BYU	1
6	USC	3

Regional finals
3	Washington	3
6	USC	2

=== Lexington, Kentucky Regional ===
First round
7	Stanford	3
Hampton	0
Stanford, CA
Alabama	1
Oklahoma	3
Iowa State	1
Colorado	3
Minneapolis, MN
10	Minnesota	3
Radford	0
15	Kentucky	3
Duquesne	0
Lexington, KY
Ohio	0
Michigan State	3
Utah	3
Yale	1
State College, PA
2	Penn State	3
LIU-Brooklyn	0

Second round
7	Stanford	3
Oklahoma	0
Colorado	2
10	Minnesota	3
15	Kentucky	1
Michigan State	3
Utah	0
2	Penn State	3

Regional semifinals
7	Stanford	3
10	Minnesota	0
Michigan State	1
2	Penn State	3

Regional finals
7	Stanford	2
2	Penn State	3

== Final Four ==
National Semifinals
1	Texas	1
12	Wisconsin	3
3	Washington	0
2	Penn State	3

National Championship
12	Wisconsin	1
2	Penn State	3

Final Four All-Tournament Team:

- Micha Hancock - Penn State (Most Outstanding Player)
- Ariel Scott - Penn State
- Deja McClendon - Penn State
- Katie Slay - Penn State
- Deme Morales - Wisconsin
- Lauren Carlini - Wisconsin
- Krista Vansant - Washington

== Record by conference ==
Conference	# of Bids	Record	Win %	R32	S16	E8	F4	CM	NC
Pac-12	9	15–9*	.625	8	3	3	1	–	–
Big Ten	8	23–7*	.769	7	7	4	2	2	1
Southeastern	8	5–8	.385	5	–	–	–	–	–
Atlantic Coast	4	3–4	.429	2	1	–	–	–	–
Big 12	4	6-4	.600	3	2	1	1	–	–
Big West	3	2–3	.400	2	–	–	–	–	–
Big East	2	2–2	.500	2	–	–	–	–	–
West Coast	2	4–2	.667	2	2	–	–	–	–
Patriot	1	2-1	.667	1	1	–	–	–	–
Other	23	0–23	.000	–	–	–	–	–	–

*Four tournament matches featured one Big Ten team against another, and likewise one featured one Pac-12 team against another. Each of those matches is counted as one win and one loss for the respective conference.

The columns R32, S16, E8, F4, CM, and NC respectively stand for the Round of 32, Sweet Sixteen, Elite Eight, Final Four, Championship Match, and National Champion.

The America East, American Athletic, Atlantic 10, Atlantic Sun, Big Sky, Big South, Colonial Athletic, Conference USA, Horizon League, Ivy League, Metro Atlantic, Mid-American, Mid-Eastern Athletic, Missouri Valley, Mountain West, Northeast, Ohio Valley, Southern, Southland, Southwestern Athletic, Summit League, Sun Belt and Western Athletic Conferences all qualified one team which lost in the first round.
