= Florida A&M Rattlers and Lady Rattlers =

Florida A&M University sports teams

- University: Florida A&M University
- Nickname: Rattlers
- NCAA: Division I (FCS)
- Conference: SWAC
- Athletic director: Angela Suggs
- Location: Tallahassee, Florida
- Varsity teams: 15 (6 men's, 9 women's)
- Football stadium: Bragg Memorial Stadium
- Basketball arena: Al Lawson Center
- Baseball stadium: Moore–Kittles Field
- Softball stadium: Veronica Wiggins Field at University Softball Complex
- Tennis venue: Althea Gibson Tennis Complex
- Colors: Green and orange
- Mascot: Venum & Miss Venum
- Fight song: Rattler Orange and Green
- Website: famuathletics.com

The Florida A&M Rattlers represent Florida A&M University (FAMU) in college athletics. Florida A&M is a member of the Southwestern Athletic Conference and participates in NCAA Division I Football Championship Subdivision (FCS). FAMU offers men's sports in baseball, basketball, football, golf, and track and field. It offers women's sports in basketball, bowling, cheerleading, cross country, softball, tennis, track and field and volleyball.

== Sports Sponsored ==
Men's sports	Women's sports
Baseball	Basketball
Basketball	Bowling
Football	Cheerleading
Golf	Cross country
Track and field^{†}	Softball
	Tennis
	Track and field^{†}
	Volleyball
† – Track and field includes both indoor and outdoor.

=== Football ===
Florida A&M has a storied football program. From 1938 to 1961, the football team won the Black College National Championship eight times, including six times under head coach Jake Gaither, in 1950, 1952, 1954, 1957, 1959 and 1961. When Gaither retired after 25 years of coaching in 1969, his FAMU teams had a 203-36-4 (wins-losses-ties) record, for a .844 winning percentage. Thirty-six players from Gaither's teams were All-Americans, and 42 went on to play in the National Football League. During his 25 years as head coach, FAMU won 22 Southern Intercollegiate Athletic Conference championships. Gaither was elected to the College Football Hall of Fame in 1975. FAMU went on to win the first NCAA D1-AA National Championship in 1978 after defeating the University of Massachusetts Amherst. The Rattlers meet the Bethune–Cookman Wildcats every year in the Florida Classic on the third weekend in November. The Rattlers lead the overall series with Bethune Cookman University, 45-15-1. One of the most notable wins in FAMU football history came when they defeated the University of Miami in 1979.

On November 15, 2008, Florida A&M football received national attention when ESPN's College GameDay was broadcast live from the campus. FAMU became the first historically black college or university campus to ever host the program.

The Florida A&M Rattlers have won 29 Conference Championships and 13 different college football national titles. They have won the black college football national championship 11 times. An Associated Press College Division National Championship in 1962. The Rattlers also won the inaugural NCAA Division I-AA National Championship in 1978.

=== Men's tennis ===
The Florida A&M Rattlers Men's Tennis team won HBCU National Tennis Championships in 2003, 2007, 2008, 2009 and 2010. They also captured the MEAC Championship for the 2016-2017 season, beating South Carolina State 4–2. Freshman recruit, Luis Federico Nani from Argentina, clinched the last game. The Men Rattlers made it to the first round of the NCAA Championship. The Women's team won the HBCU National Tennis Championship in 2008.
