= SEC volleyball tournament =

- Conference volleyball championship
- Sport: Volleyball
- Conference: Southeastern Conference
- Number of teams: 16
- Format: Single-elimination
- Current stadium: Enmarket Arena
- Current location: Savannah, Georgia
- Played: 1979–2005, 2025–present
- Last contest: 2025
- Current champion: Kentucky (6th title)
- Most championships: Florida (12 titles)
- TV partner: SEC Network

The SEC volleyball tournament is the conference championship tournament in women's college volleyball for the Southeastern Conference (SEC). First held in 1979, the tournament was played annually through 2005 before returning in 2025. It is a single-elimination tournament with seeding based on conference records. The winner receives the conference's automatic bid to the NCAA women's volleyball tournament.

== History ==
The SEC volleyball tournament was first held in 1979 and served as the overall conference championship through 1985. Beginning in 1988, the tournament was held at neutral sites before returning to campus sites in 1994.The tournament was discontinued after the 2005 season to accommodate an expanded conference regular-season schedule. In September 2024, the SEC announced that the tournament would return in 2025 and be held at a neutral site in Savannah, Georgia. The tournament returned in November 2025 following a 20-year hiatus, with Kentucky winning the championship.

=== Tournaments ===
| Year | Champion | Score | Runner-up | Tournament MVP | Location |
|---|---|---|---|---|---|
| 1979 | Kentucky | 3–1 | Tennessee | No MVP awarded | Tuscaloosa, Alabama |
| 1980 | Kentucky | 2–1 | Tennessee | No MVP awarded | Lexington, Kentucky |
| 1981 | Tennessee | 3–0 | Alabama | No MVP awarded | Knoxville, Tennessee |
| 1982 | Tennessee | 3–0 | LSU | Beverly Robinson, UT | Baton Rouge, Louisiana |
| 1983 | Kentucky | 3–1 | Tennessee | Karolyn Kirby, UK | Lexington, Kentucky |
| 1984 | Tennessee | 3–1 | Kentucky | April Chapple, UT | Knoxville, Tennessee |
| 1985 | Georgia | 3–1 | LSU | Sandi Trani, UGA | Oxford, Mississippi |
| 1986 | LSU | 3–1 | Georgia | Detra Brown, LSU | Gainesville, Florida |
| 1987 | Kentucky | 3–0 | Florida | Lisa Dausman, UK | Baton Rouge, Louisiana |
| 1988 | Kentucky | 3–0 | Tennessee | Kim Thompson, UK | Pensacola, Florida |
| 1989 | LSU | 3–0 | Kentucky | Dani Reis, LSU | Pensacola, Florida |
| 1990 | LSU | 3–2 | Georgia | Luciana Reis, LSU | Mobile, Alabama |
| 1991 | LSU | 3–0 | Florida | Monique Adams, LSU | Mobile, Alabama |
| 1992 | Florida | 3–1 | LSU | Gudula Staub, UF | Birmingham, Alabama |
| 1993 | Florida | 3–1 | Georgia | Aycan Gokberk, UF | Birmingham, Alabama |
| 1994 | Florida | 3–1 | Georgia | Priscilla Pacheco, UGA | Gainesville, Florida |
| 1995 | Florida | 3–0 | Arkansas | Aycan Gokberk, UF | Baton Rouge, Louisiana |
| 1996 | Florida | 3–1 | Arkansas | Aurymar Rodriguez, UF | Columbia, South Carolina |
| 1997 | Arkansas | 3–0 | Florida | Krystal Osborne, ARK | Athens, Georgia |
| 1998 | Florida | 3–1 | Arkansas | Heather Wright, UF | Fayetteville, Arkansas |
| 1999 | Florida | 3–1 | Arkansas | Jenny Whitehead, UF | Knoxville, Tennessee |
| 2000 | Florida | 3–0 | LSU | Aury Cruz, UF | Gainesville, Florida |
| 2001 | Florida | 3–2 | Arkansas | Aury Cruz, UF | Knoxville, Tennessee |
| 2002 | Florida | 3–1 | Arkansas | Jacque Robinson, UF | Fayetteville, Arkansas |
| 2003 | Florida | 3–0 | Arkansas | Aury Cruz, UF | Columbia, South Carolina |
| 2004 | Tennessee | 3–2 | Florida | Amy Morris, UT | Gainesville, Florida |
| 2005 | Florida | 3–0 | Alabama | Jany Collymore, UF | Tuscaloosa, Alabama |
| 2006–2024 | No tournament | | | | |
| 2025 | Kentucky | 3–2 | Texas | Molly Tuozzo, UK | Enmarket Arena (Savannah, Georgia) |
| 2026 | | | | | Enmarket Arena (Savannah, Georgia) |

=== Tournament championships by school ===
| School | Championships | Championship Years |
|---|---|---|
| Florida | 12 | 1992, 1993, 1994, 1995, 1996, 1998, 1999, 2000, 2001, 2002, 2003, 2005 |
| Kentucky | 6 | 1979, 1980, 1983, 1987, 1988, 2025 |
| LSU | 4 | 1986, 1989, 1990, 1991 |
| Tennessee | 4 | 1981, 1982, 1984, 2004 |
| Arkansas | 1 | 1997 |
| Georgia | 1 | 1985 |
| Alabama | 0 | — |
| Auburn | 0 | — |
| Mississippi State | 0 | — |
| Missouri | 0 | — |
| Oklahoma | 0 | — |
| Ole Miss | 0 | — |
| South Carolina | 0 | — |
| Texas | 0 | — |
| Texas A&M | 0 | — |
| Vanderbilt | 0 | |
