= 2026 SEC volleyball tournament =

American college volleyball postseason tournament

- Classification: Division I
- Teams: 16
- Site: Enmarket Arena; Savannah, Georgia
- Television: SEC Network, SECN+

The 2026 SEC volleyball tournament is the post-season volleyball tournament for the 2026 season for the Southeastern Conference (SEC). The tournament is being held from November 20–24, 2026 at Enmarket Arena in Savannah, Georgia. The winner will receive the conference's automatic bid to the 2026 NCAA tournament.

== Seeds ==
All 16 members of the SEC will participate in the tournament. The top eight seeds will earn a bye to the second round, with the top four seeds earned a double bye to the quarterfinals. Ties were broken by head-to-head results and the FIVB Point System for all conference matches.

Seed	School	Conference record	Tiebreaker 1	Tiebreaker 2
1	Florida	14–1		
2	Kentucky	12–3	1–0 vs. Vanderbilt	
3	Vanderbilt	12–3	0–1 vs. Kentucky	
4	Texas	11–4	1–0 vs. Tennessee	
5	Tennessee	11–4	0–1 vs. Texas	
6	Missouri	10–5		
7	Texas A&M	9–6		
8	Mississippi State	7–8	1–0 vs. Georgia	
9	Georgia	7–8	0–1 vs. Mississippi State	
10	LSU	6–9		
11	Auburn	5–10	2–0 vs. Arkansas/Oklahoma	
12	Arkansas	5–10	1–1 vs. Auburn/Oklahoma	
13	Oklahoma	5–10	0–2 vs. Auburn/Oklahoma	
14	Alabama	2–13	11 FIVB points	
15	South Carolina	2–13	6 FIVB points	1–0 vs. Ole Miss
16	Ole Miss	2–13	6 FIVB points	0–1 vs. South Carolina

== Schedule ==
Game	Time	Matchup	Score	Television	Attendance
First round – Friday, November 20
1	12:00 p.m.	No. 9 Georgia vs. No. 16 Ole Miss	3–0	SECN	
2	2:30 p.m.	No. 12 Arkansas vs. No. 13 Oklahoma	1–3	SECN	
3	5:00 p.m.	No. 10 LSU vs. No. 15 South Carolina	3–1	SECN	
4	7:30 p.m.	No. 11 Auburn vs. No. 14 Alabama	3–2	SECN	
Second round – Saturday, November 21
5	12:00 p.m.	No. 8 Mississippi State vs. No. 9 Georgia	2–3	SECN+	
6	2:30 p.m.	No. 5 Tennessee vs. No. 13 Oklahoma	3–1	SECN+	
7	5:00 p.m.	No. 7 Texas A&M vs. No. 10 LSU	2–3	SECN+	
8	7:30 p.m.	No. 6 Missouri vs. No. 11 Auburn	3–1	SECN+	
Quarterfinals – Sunday, November 22
9	12:00 p.m.	No. 1 Florida vs. No. 9 Georgia	1–3	SECN	
10	2:30 p.m.	No. 4 Texas vs. No. 5 Tennessee		SECN	
11	5:00 p.m.	No. 2 Kentucky vs. No. 10 LSU		SECN	
12	7:30 p.m.	No. 3 Vanderbilt vs. No. 6 Missouri		SECN	
Semifinals – Monday, November 23
13	6:00 p.m.	No. 9 Georgia vs. Winner Match 10		SECN	
14	8:30 p.m.	Winner Match 11 vs. Winner Match 12		SECN	
Championship – Tuesday, November 24
15	7:00 p.m.	Winner Match 13 vs. Winner Match 14		SECN	
Game times in ET. Rankings denote tournament seeding.

== Bracket ==
First round Friday, November 20; SECN
9	Georgia	3
16	Ole Miss	0
12	Arkansas	1
13	Oklahoma	3
10	LSU	3
15	South Carolina	1
11	Auburn	3
14	Alabama	2

Second round Saturday, November 21; SECN+
8	Mississippi State	2
9	Georgia	3
5	Tennessee	3
13	Oklahoma	1
7	Texas A&M	2
10	LSU	3
6	Missouri	3
11	Auburn	1

Quarterfinals; Sunday, November 22; SECN
1	Florida	1
9	Georgia	3
4	Texas
5	Tennessee
2	Kentucky
10	LSU
3	Vanderbilt
6	Missouri

Semifinals; Monday, November 23; SECN
9	Georgia

Championship; Tuesday, November 24; SECN

== Game summaries ==
=== First round ===
November 20; 12:00 p.m.	No. 9 Georgia	3–0	No. 16 Ole Miss	Enmarket Arena; Savannah, GA
November 20; 12:00 p.m.	(25–21, 25–20, 25–17)			Enmarket Arena; Savannah, GA
Gigi Artiles, 16		Kills	Shayla Meyer, 13
Chloe Elarton, 7		Digs	Rileigh Butler, 9
Chloe Elarton, 26		Assist	Vivianna Samaniego, 19

November 20; 2:30 p.m.	No. 12 Arkansas	1–3	No. 13 Oklahoma	Enmarket Arena; Savannah, GA
November 20; 2:30 p.m.	(26–28, 25–23, 17–25, 19–25)			Enmarket Arena; Savannah, GA
Lakin Laurendine, 17		Kills	Alaleh Tolliver, 19
Kiki Remensperger, 13		Digs	Kinsley Singleton, 18
Kiki Remensperger, 33		Assist	Avaya Maga, 60

November 20; 5:00 p.m.	No. 10 LSU	3–1	No. 15 South Carolina	Enmarket Arena; Savannah, GA
November 20; 5:00 p.m.	(25–17, 27–29, 25–16, 25–23)			Enmarket Arena; Savannah, GA
Jurnee Robinson, 31		Kills	Olivia Borgman, 14
Martina Villani, 13		Digs	Kiana Dinn, 13
Martina Villani, 50		Assist	Kiana Dinn, 23

November 20; 7:30 p.m.	No. 11 Auburn	3–2	No. 14 Alabama	Enmarket Arena; Savannah, GA
November 20; 7:30 p.m.	(25–22, 24–26, 25–19, 17–25, 18–16)			Enmarket Arena; Savannah, GA
Belle Patrick, 20		Kills	Mya Allen, 16
Emily Keiran, 17		Digs	Lindsey Brown, 19
Shanelle Puetz, 31		Assist	Hannah Parant, 43

=== Second round ===
November 21; 12:00 p.m.	No. 8 Mississippi State	2–3	No. 9 Georgia	Enmarket Arena; Savannah, GA
November 21; 12:00 p.m.	(25–23, 22–25, 25–19, 19–25, 9–15)			Enmarket Arena; Savannah, GA
Gha'Naye Whitfield-Moss, 20		Kills	Bianna Muoneke, 33
McKenna Yates, 21		Digs	Bianna Muoneke, 22
Erin Kline, 26		Assist	Chloe Elarton, 49

November 21; 2:30 p.m.	No. 5 Tennessee	3–1	No. 13 Oklahoma	Enmarket Arena; Savannah, GA
November 21; 2:30 p.m.	(25–20, 25–18, 17–25, 25–12)			Enmarket Arena; Savannah, GA
Jalyn Stout, 13		Kills	Alaleh Tolliver, 12
Maggie Dostic, 8		Digs	Kinsley Singleton, 9
Caroline Kerr, 43		Assist	Avaya Maga, 40

November 21; 5:00 p.m.	No. 7 Texas A&M	2–3	No. 10 LSU	Enmarket Arena; Savannah, GA
November 21; 5:00 p.m.	(19–25, 25–20, 25–12, 15–25, 14–16)			Enmarket Arena; Savannah, GA
Kyndal Stowers, 25		Kills	Jurnee Robinson, 26
Gabi Rodriguez, 25		Digs	Kiley Brooks, 21
Margot Manning, 49		Assist	Martina Villani, 45

November 21; 7:30 p.m.	No. 6 Missouri	3–1	No. 11 Auburn	Enmarket Arena; Savannah, GA
November 21; 7:30 p.m.	(25–23, 25–19, 22–25, 25–20)			Enmarket Arena; Savannah, GA
Kimani Johnson, 17		Kills	Belle Patrick, 14
Ainoah Cruz, 24		Digs	Emily Keiran, 15
Nina Mandovic, 29		Assist	Shanelle Puetz, 24

=== Quarterfinals ===
November 22; 12:00 p.m.	No. 1 Florida	1–3	No. 9 Georgia	Enmarket Arena; Savannah, GA
November 22; 12:00 p.m.	(25–27, 27–29, 25–22, 21–25)			Enmarket Arena; Savannah, GA
Kamryn Chaney, 22		Kills	Bianna Muoneke, 28
Lily Hayes, 20		Digs	Bianna Muoneke, 14
Taylor Parks, 54		Assist	Chloe Elarton, 46
