= Vanderbilt Commodores women's volleyball =

Women's volleyball team of Vanderbilt University

- Founded: 1979; 2025 (reinstated)
- University: Vanderbilt University
- Head coach: Anders Nelson (2nd season)
- Conference: SEC
- Location: Nashville, Tennessee, US
- Home arena: Memorial Gymnasium (capacity: 14,316)
- Nickname: Commodores
- Colors: Black and gold

The Vanderbilt Commodores women's volleyball team represents Vanderbilt University in NCAA Division I women's volleyball. The team competes in the Southeastern Conference (SEC) and plays its home matches at Memorial Gymnasium in Nashville, Tennessee. Vanderbilt first fielded a varsity team in 1979 but dropped the sport after the 1979–80 academic year. The university reinstated volleyball as its 17th varsity sport in 2022, and the team returned to competition in 2025 under head coach Anders Nelson. In 2026, its second season back, the program was ranked in the American Volleyball Coaches Association (AVCA) Coaches Poll for the first time.

== History ==
=== Original program (1979–1980) ===
Vanderbilt added volleyball in 1979, following the implementation of Title IX. The team went 23–16 in its only season. It earned its first win against Sewanee and its first SEC win against Georgia, and it finished second at the Division III state championship at Maryville College. Vanderbilt also played in the first officially recognized SEC volleyball tournament in 1979, losing to Georgia, Auburn, Alabama and Ole Miss. The university discontinued the sport after the 1979–80 academic year.

=== Reinstatement ===
On April 19, 2022, Vanderbilt announced that it would add volleyball as its 17th varsity sport, with competition beginning in the 2025–26 academic year. The university chose a 36-month timeline to build the program before its first season. With Texas and Oklahoma also joining the conference, the move meant all 16 SEC members would sponsor volleyball beginning in 2025. The university planned to renovate offices in Memorial Gymnasium and add a locker room for the team.

=== Anders Nelson era (2025–present) ===
On December 23, 2022, Vanderbilt hired Anders Nelson as the program's first head coach. Nelson had spent 11 seasons at Kentucky under Craig Skinner, the last seven as associate head coach, and helped the Wildcats win the 2020 NCAA championship. Hiring Nelson nearly three years before the first season gave him time to recruit the program's entire first roster. Nelson signed the program's first recruiting class in 2023, and its first players arrived on campus in 2024.

==== 2025 ====
Vanderbilt played its first match in 45 years on August 23, 2025, against No. 14 Kansas at Pinnacle Bank Arena in Lincoln, Nebraska. The Commodores led two sets to one before losing in five. On August 29, the Commodores beat Belmont 3–1 in their home opener on an outdoor court on Wyatt Lawn. The match drew 3,467 fans and was Vanderbilt's first home volleyball win since 1980. Two days later, Vanderbilt lost to Illinois in four sets at the Broadway Block Party, the first college volleyball event at Bridgestone Arena, which drew more than 11,200 fans across three matches. On November 7, the team set a program attendance record of 4,960 at Memorial Gymnasium in a loss to No. 19 Tennessee.

Vanderbilt finished 15th in the SEC regular season at 3–12 and entered the conference tournament at Enmarket Arena in Savannah, Georgia, as the No. 15 seed. The Commodores swept No. 10 seed Mississippi State in the first round and beat No. 7 seed Georgia 3–1 in the second round before losing to No. 2 seed Texas A&M in the quarterfinals. Vanderbilt finished 9–18 overall and 3–12 in SEC play. Middle blocker Jackie Moore was named to the All-SEC Second Team and was the SEC Volleyball Scholar-Athlete of the Year. On November 24, the Atlanta Vibe selected Moore in the third round, 21st overall, of the 2025 Major League Volleyball draft, making her the program's first draft pick.

==== 2026 ====
Vanderbilt won its first nine matches of 2026. On September 13, the Commodores beat No. 18 North Carolina 3–1 at the Hammerstein Ballroom in New York City for the first ranked win in program history. On October 11, Vanderbilt beat No. 5 Florida 3–1 at Memorial Gymnasium for the first top-five win in program history. The Commodores then entered the AVCA poll for the first time at No. 24. On November 6, No. 21 Vanderbilt beat No. 17 Texas A&M 3–1 at Memorial Gymnasium for its first win over the Aggies. The win improved Vanderbilt to 18–3 overall and 9–3 in SEC play, tied for second in the conference.

== Conference affiliations ==
- Southeastern Conference (1979–1980, 2025–present)

== Coaches ==
=== Coaching history ===
Coach	Years	Overall record	Conference record	Postseason highlights
Unknown	1979	23–16	—	—
Anders Nelson	2025–present	27–21	12–15	SEC tournament quarterfinals (2025)

Nelson's record includes the 2026 season through November 7, 2026.

=== Current coaching staff ===
Position	Name
Head coach	Anders Nelson
Defensive coordinator / general manager	Russell Corbelli
Assistant coach	Azhani Tealer

== Venue ==
Vanderbilt plays its home matches at Memorial Gymnasium. The arena opened in 1952, seats 14,316 and is also home to the men's and women's basketball teams. The program's first home match was played on an outdoor court on Wyatt Lawn.

=== Notable crowds ===
Date	Opponent	Venue	Attendance	Notes
August 31, 2025	Illinois	Bridgestone Arena	11,200+	Broadway Block Party; total for three-match event
November 7, 2025	Tennessee	Memorial Gymnasium	4,960	Program attendance record
August 29, 2025	Belmont	Wyatt Lawn (outdoor)	3,467	First home match since 1980

== Program milestones ==
- First match of the modern era: August 23, 2025, lost to No. 14 Kansas in five sets
- First win of the modern era: August 29, 2025, 3–1 vs. Belmont
- First SEC tournament wins: November 2025, vs. Mississippi State and Georgia
- First win over a ranked opponent: September 13, 2026, 3–1 vs. No. 18 North Carolina
- First win over a top-five opponent: October 11, 2026, 3–1 vs. No. 5 Florida
- First AVCA Top 25 ranking: No. 24, October 2026

== Awards and honors ==
=== Conference awards ===
- Jackie Moore – All-SEC Second Team (2025); SEC Volleyball Scholar-Athlete of the Year (2025)

=== Academic honors ===
- Jackie Moore – College Sports Communicators Academic All-America First Team (2025)

=== Professional draft picks ===
- Jackie Moore – Atlanta Vibe, 2025 Major League Volleyball draft (third round, 21st overall)

== Season-by-season results ==
Season	Coach	Overall	Conference	Standing	Postseason
Original program (1979)
1979	Unknown	23–16			SEC tournament
No team (1980–2024)
Anders Nelson (2025–present)
2025	Anders Nelson	9–18	3–12	15th SEC	SEC tournament quarterfinals
2026	Anders Nelson	18–3*	9–3*		

* Season in progress, as of November 7, 2026.

== See also ==
- Vanderbilt Commodores
- List of NCAA Division I women's volleyball programs
