= UCLA Bruins women's volleyball =

American college volleyball team

- University: UCLA
- Head coach: Alfredo Reft (3rd season)
- Conference: Big Ten
- Location: Los Angeles, California, US
- Home arena: Pauley Pavilion (capacity: 12,829)
- Nickname: Bruins
- Colors: Blue and gold

AIAW/NCAA tournament champion
- 1971–72, 1974, 1975, 1984, 1990, 1991, 2011

AIAW/NCAA tournament runner-up
- 1969–70, 1976, 1978, 1981, 1983, 1992, 1994

AIAW/NCAA tournament semifinal
- 1972–73, 1973, 1977, 1979, 1980, 1981, 1983, 1984, 1985, 1988, 1989, 1990, 1991, 1992, 1994, 2006, 2011

AIAW/NCAA Regional Final
- 1972–73, 1973, 1977, 1979, 1980, 1981, 1983, 1984, 1985, 1988, 1989, 1990, 1991, 1992, 1994, 1999, 2000, 2001, 2003, 2004, 2006, 2007, 2011, 2016

AIAW/NCAA tournament appearance
- 1981, 1982, 1983, 1984, 1985, 1986, 1987, 1988, 1989, 1990, 1991, 1992, 1993, 1994, 1995, 1997, 1998, 1999, 2000, 2001, 2002, 2003, 2004, 2005, 2006, 2007, 2008, 2009, 2011, 2012, 2014, 2015, 2016, 2017, 2019, 2020, 2021, 2025

Conference regular season champion
- 1986, 1988, 1989, 1990, 1992, 1993, 1999

The UCLA women's volleyball program began its first year in 1965. Andy Banachowski was the head coach each year since 1965 until his retirement after the 2009 season, with the exception of the two seasons of 1968–69 and 1969–70, after he graduated from UCLA. In those seasons, Mardi Hardy Monroe was the head coach. Michael Sealy took over as head coach in 2010 and led the team to a national championship in 2011.

Banachowski had more wins than any other NCAA Division I women's volleyball coach, with a record (since 1970, since no records were kept from 1965 to 1969) of 1,106–301. Banachowski had led UCLA to six national championships (3 NCAA–1984, 1990, 1991; 2 AIAW–1974, 1975; and 1 DGWS–1972). UCLA has made 27 of 28 NCAA tournaments and has made 11 NCAA Final Fours, which is tied with Nebraska as the second most Final Four appearances of all Division I programs.

A record-setting crowd of 10,498 saw the Bruins play against No. 1 ranked Nebraska Huskers in Pauley Pavilion on November 14, 2025.

== NCAA championships ==
=== 1984 ===
UCLA claimed the program's first NCAA national title (fourth overall) after four previous runner-up finishes following the team's 1975 AIAW title. In the deciding fifth game against Stanford, UCLA was down 12–4, but with heroics from Liz Masakayan, the Bruins continued to chip away at the lead before earning match point at 14–13. Masakayan had the final kill to give UCLA the 15–13 win.

=== 1990 ===
UCLA won the NCAA title by defeating Pacific 15–9, 15–12, 15–7. UCLA was led by Natalie Williams and Marissa Hatchett who had 12 kills a piece. The Bruins finished the 1990 season 36–1.

=== 1991 ===
Playing at Pauley Pavilion, the Bruins repeated as NCAA champions by defeating Long Beach State in five games. After losing the first two games by the scores of 15–12, 15–13, UCLA completed off a huge comeback to take the next three games, 15–12, 15–6, 15–11.

UCLA's comebacks was one of the biggest in NCAA history, since this match, no team had ever before rallied from 2 games to 0 to win in five games in the NCAA national championship. UCLA finished their season 31–5

=== 2011 ===
After 20 years, the UCLA Bruins captured their fourth NCAA title and seventh overall by defeating Illinois 3–1 on December 17, 2011, at the Alamodome in San Antonio, Texas. The Bruins were seeded ninth in the NCAA championship tournament. On their way to the title game, they defeated 4-time defending champions Penn State and No. 1 seeded Texas to face No. 3 seeded Illinois. Rachael Kidder was named the most outstanding player of the tournament. Lauren Van Orden and Zoe Nightingale were also named to the all tournament team. Head coach Michael Sealy became a champion both as a player and a head coach. The women's volleyball team was featured in the new Pac-12 Networks Promo for the 2012 season.

== Season-by-season results ==
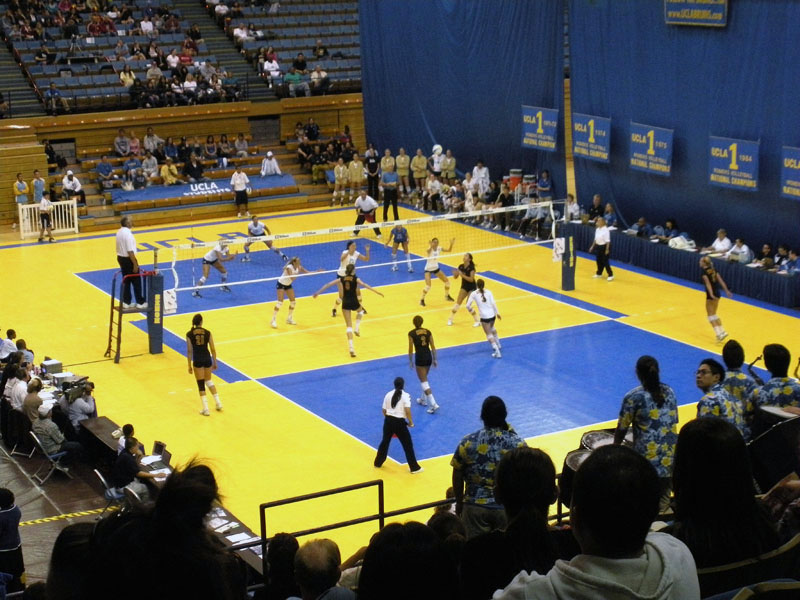
UCLA vs. USC in volleyball, 2008

Note: No records were kept until the 1970–71 season.

The three seasons from 1965–1968 and 40 seasons from 1970–2009 were coached by Andy Banachowski.

- Conference History
  - 1974–1975: Southern California Women's Intercollegiate Athletic Conference
  - 1976–1984: Western Collegiate Athletic Association
  - 1985: PacWest Conference
  - 1986–present: Pac-12 Conference

Year	Overall record	Conference record	Conference standing	Postseason
1969–70				DGWS 2nd Place
1970–71	23–1			–
1971–72	28–1			DGWS Champions
1972–73	23–9			AIAW 3rd Place
1973	26–8			AIAW 4th Place
1974	28–2	2–2	3rd	AIAW Champions
1975	32–2	4–0	1st	AIAW Champions
1976	29–8	6–2	2nd	AIAW Runners-Up
1977	32–8	6–2	2nd	AIAW 3rd Place
1978	33–5	7–1	1st	AIAW Runners-Up
1979	27–12	9–3	2nd	AIAW 3rd Place
1980	38–14	10–2	2nd	AIAW 4th Place
1981	34–11	10–2	2nd	NCAA Runners-Up
1982	28–14	6–8	5th	NCAA Regional Final
1983	44–6	13–1	1st	NCAA Runners-Up
1984	33–6	11–3	2nd	NCAA Champions
1985	29–8	5–3	2nd	NCAA Final Four
1986	31–10	17–1	1st	NCAA first round
1987	28–10	13–5	2nd	NCAA Regional semifinal
1988	34–1	18–0	1st	NCAA Final Four
1989	30–3	18–0	1st	NCAA Final Four
1990	36–1	18–0	1st	NCAA Champions
1991	31–5	16–2	2nd	NCAA Champions
1992	33–1	18–0	1st	NCAA Runners-Up
1993	30–2	17–1	1st	NCAA Regional Final
1994	32–4	16–2	2nd	NCAA Runners-Up
1995	23–9	12–6	2nd	NCAA Regional Final
1996	17–14	9–9	6th	–
1997	17–13	9–9	6th	NCAA second round
1998	16–12	13–5	3rd	NCAA second round
1999	28–4	17–1	1st	NCAA Regional Final
2000	25–8	14–4	4th	NCAA Regional Final
2001	21–9	12–6	4th	NCAA Regional Final
2002	20–14	9–9	5th	NCAA second round
2003	24–9	12–6	3rd	NCAA Regional Final
2004	21–11	11–7	4th	NCAA Regional Final
2005	20–11	10–8	5th	NCAA Regional semifinal
2006	33–4	15–3	2nd	NCAA Final Four
2007	23–11	9–9	5th	NCAA Regional Final
2008	22–11	9–9	5th	NCAA Regional semifinal
2009	24–9	13–5	2nd	NCAA second round
2010	22–9	11–7	4th	NCAA second round
2011	30–6	17–5	2nd	NCAA Champions
2012	23–8	14–6	4th	NCAA Second Round
2013	15–15	6–14	10th	NCAA DNQ
2014	22–12	11–9	4th	NCAA Regional semifinal
2015	25–8	14–6	4th	NCAA Regional semifinal
2016	27–7	15–5	2nd	NCAA Regional Final
2017	21–11	12–8	5th	NCAA Regional semifinal
2018	13-14	8-12	9th	NCAA DNQ
2019	19-12	13-7	4th	NCAA Second Round
2020	15-7	14-6	5th	NCAA Second Round
2021	25–6	16–4	2nd	NCAA Regional semifinal
2022	9–8	3–5		Updated 10/16/22
Total	1,372–424	568–230		

== Olympians ==
Former players who have gone to the Olympic Games to play or coach.

- Players
  - Laurie Lewis – 1968 (indoor)
  - Jeanne (Beauprey) Reeves – 1984 (indoor)
  - Liz Masakayan – 1988 (indoor)
  - Elaine Youngs – 1996 (indoor), 2004 & 2008 (beach)
  - Holly McPeak – 1996, 2000, & 2004 (beach)
  - Linda (Robertson) Handley – 1996 (beach)
  - Annett Davis – 2000 (beach)
  - Jenny Johnson Jordan – 2000 (beach)
  - Elisabeth Bachman – 2004 (indoor)
- Coaches
  - Jeanne (Beauprey) Reeves – 1996 (assistant coach)
  - Liz Masakayan – 2004 & 2008 (Coach of McPeak/Youngs beach volleyball team)

== Postseason ==
The UCLA Bruins have an NCAA Division I Tournament record of 90–32 through thirty-five appearances.

Year	Round	Opponent	Result
1981	Regional semifinals Regional finals Semifinals; National Championship	Purdue; Stanford; San Diego State; USC	W 3–2; W 3–2; W 3–1; L 2–3
1982	First round Regional semifinals Regional finals	Louisville; BYU; San Diego State	W 3–0; W 3–0; L 1–3
1983	Regional semifinals Regional finals Semifinals; National Championship	Penn State; Western Michigan; Pacific; Hawaii	W 3–0; W 3–0; W 3–2; L 0–3
1984	Regional semifinals Regional finals Semifinals; National Championship	Duke; Texas; San Jose State; Stanford	W 3–0; W 3–1; W 3–0; W 3–2
1985	Regional semifinals Regional finals Semifinals	Georgia; Texas; Pacific	W 3–0; W 3–0; L 1–3
1986	First round	Loyola Marymount	L 2–3
1987	First round Regional semifinals	California; BYU	W 3–1; L 1–3
1988	First round Regional semifinals Regional finals Semifinals	California; BYU; Washington; Texas	W 3–0; W 3–0; W 3–0; L 0–3
1989	First round Regional semifinals Regional finals Semifinals	Pepperdine; Arizona; Wyoming; Nebraska	W 3–1; W 3–0; W 3–0; L 0–3
1990	First round Regional semifinals Regional finals Semifinals; National Championship	Gonzaga; New Mexico; Stanford; LSU; Pacific	W 3–0; W 3–1; W 3–0; W 3–0; W 3–0
1991	First round Regional semifinals Regional finals Semifinals; National Championship	Pepperdine; New Mexico; Stanford; Ohio State; Long Beach State	W 3–0; W 3–0; W 3–0; W 3–0; W 3–2
1992	First round Regional semifinals Regional finals Semifinals; National Championship	Ball State; Arizona State; BYU; Florida; Stanford	W 3–0; W 3–0; W 3–0; W 3–0; L 1–3
1993	Second round Regional semifinals Regional finals	New Mexico; Stanford; BYU	W 3–0; W 3–1; L 0–3
1994	Second round Regional semifinals Regional finals Semifinals; National Championship	Georgia Tech; Duke; Houston; Penn State; Stanford	W 3–0; W 3–0; W 3–0; W 3–2; L 1–3
1995	Second round Regional semifinals Regional finals	Ball State; Ohio State; Nebraska	W 3–0; W 3–0; L 0–3
1997	First round Second round	Pepperdine; UC Santa Barbara	W 3–1; L 2–3
1998	First round Second round	Virginia; UC Santa Barbara	W 3–1; L 1–3
1999	First round Second round Regional semifinals Regional finals	Eastern Washington; Ohio State; Pepperdine; Penn State	W 3–0; W 3–0; W 3–0; L 0–3
2000	First round Second round Regional semifinals Regional finals	Morgan State; Michigan State; Pacific; Wisconsin	W 3–0; W 3–2; W 3–1; L 2–3
2001	First round Second round Regional semifinals Regional finals	Penn; Penn State; Hawaii; Long Beach State	W 3–0; W 3–0; W 3–1; L 0–3
2002	First round Second round	Long Beach State; Pepperdine	W 3–0; L 1–3
2003	First round Second round Regional semifinals Regional finals	San Diego; UC Irvine; Nebraska; USC	W 3–0; W 3–0; W 3–1; L 1–3
2004	First round Second round Regional semifinals Regional finals	Loyola Marymount; Long Beach State; Penn State; Washington	W 3–1; W 3–0; W 3–1; L 2–3
2005	First round Second round Regional semifinals	Kansas; San Diego; Nebraska	W 3–1; W 3–0; L 0–3
2006	First round Second round Regional semifinals Regional finals Semifinals	UAB; Utah; Oklahoma; Hawaii; Nebraska	W 3–0; W 3–0; W 3–0; W 3–0; L 1–3
2007	First round Second round Regional semifinals Regional finals	Alabama A&M; Clemson; Oregon; Stanford	W 3–0; W 3–1; W 3–1; L 1–3
2008	First round Second round Regional semifinals	LSU; Duke; Texas	W 3–1; W 3–0; L 1–3
2009	First round Second round	Long Beach State; Baylor	W 3–0; L 1–3
2010	First round Second round	American; Texas	W 3–2; L 1–3
2011	First round Second round Regional semifinals Regional finals Semifinals; National Championship	UMES; San Diego; Penn State; Texas; Florida State; Illinois	W 3–0; W 3–1; W 3–0; W 3–1; W 3–0; W 3–1
2012	First round Second round	LIU Brooklyn; Michigan State	W 3–0; L 1–3
2014	First round Second round Regional semifinals	LIU Brooklyn; Long Beach State; Penn State	W 3–0; W 3–0; L 0–3
2015	First round Second round Regional semifinals	Lipscomb; Michigan; Texas	W 3–0; W 3–2; L 1–3
2016	First round Second round Regional semifinals Regional finals	Murray State; Baylor; North Carolina; Minnesota	W 3–1; W 3–0; W 3–1; L 0–3
2017	First round Second round Regional semifinals	Austin Peay; Cal Poly; Florida	W 3–0; W 3–1; L 1–3

== See also ==
- List of NCAA Division I women's volleyball programs
