= List of Women's Volleyball Academic All-America Team Members of the Year =

Student athlete award

The Women's Volleyball Academic All-America Team Member of the Year is the annual most outstanding singular college volleyball athlete of the set of female volleyball athletes selected for the Academic All-America Teams in a given year.

== Tables of winners ==
Key
†	Indicates winners of the all-sports Academic All-America award.

All winners are American unless indicated otherwise.

Women's Volleyball Academic All-America Team Members of the Year
- Awarded for: The yearly outstanding women's college volleyball Academic All-America team member
- Country: United States and Canada
- Presented by: College Sports Communicators

History
- Most recent: Bergen Reilly, Nebraska; Makenna Nold, Concordia (MN); Graycee Mosley, East Texas Baptist; Zavyr Metzger, Northwestern (IA)
- Next ceremony: 2026
- Website: Official site

=== Two-division era (1987–2010) ===
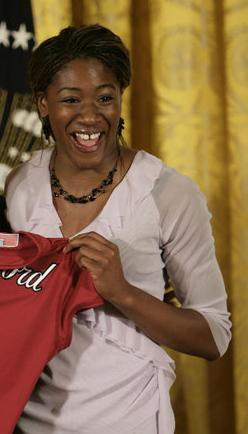
Ogonna Nnamani (picture 2005), 2004 winner

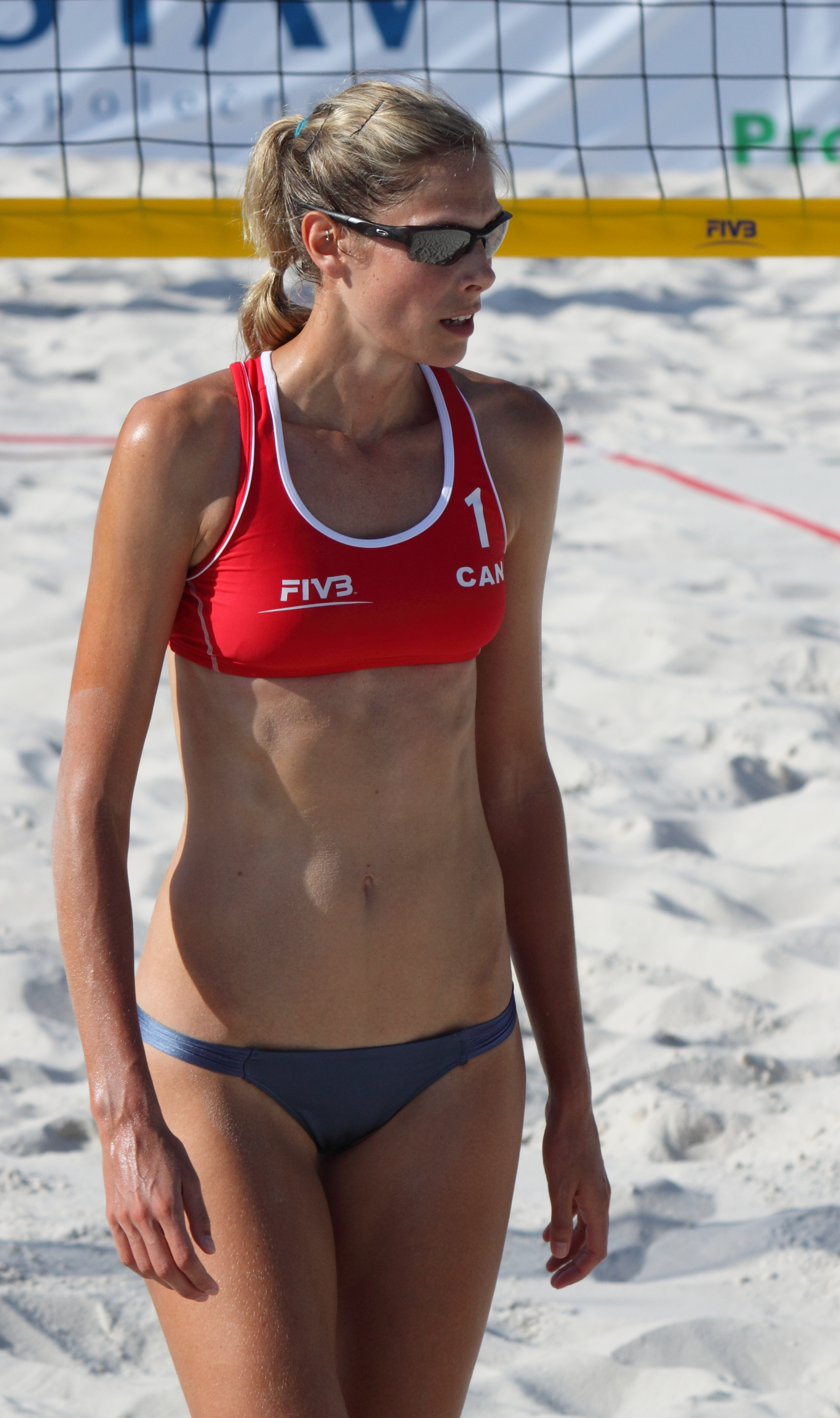
Sarah Pavan (picture 2014), 2006 and 2007 winner

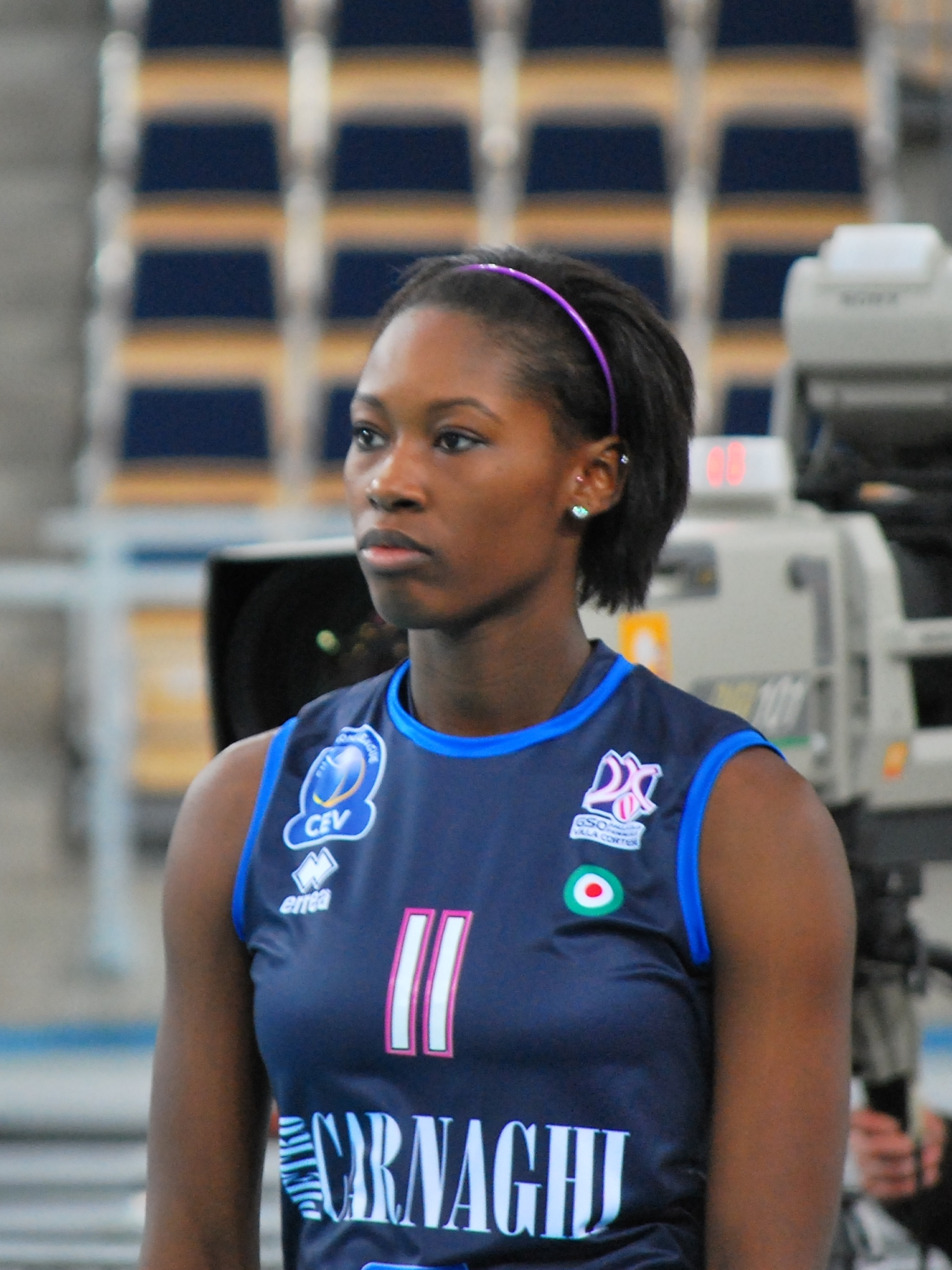
Megan Hodge (pictured in 2019), 2009 winner

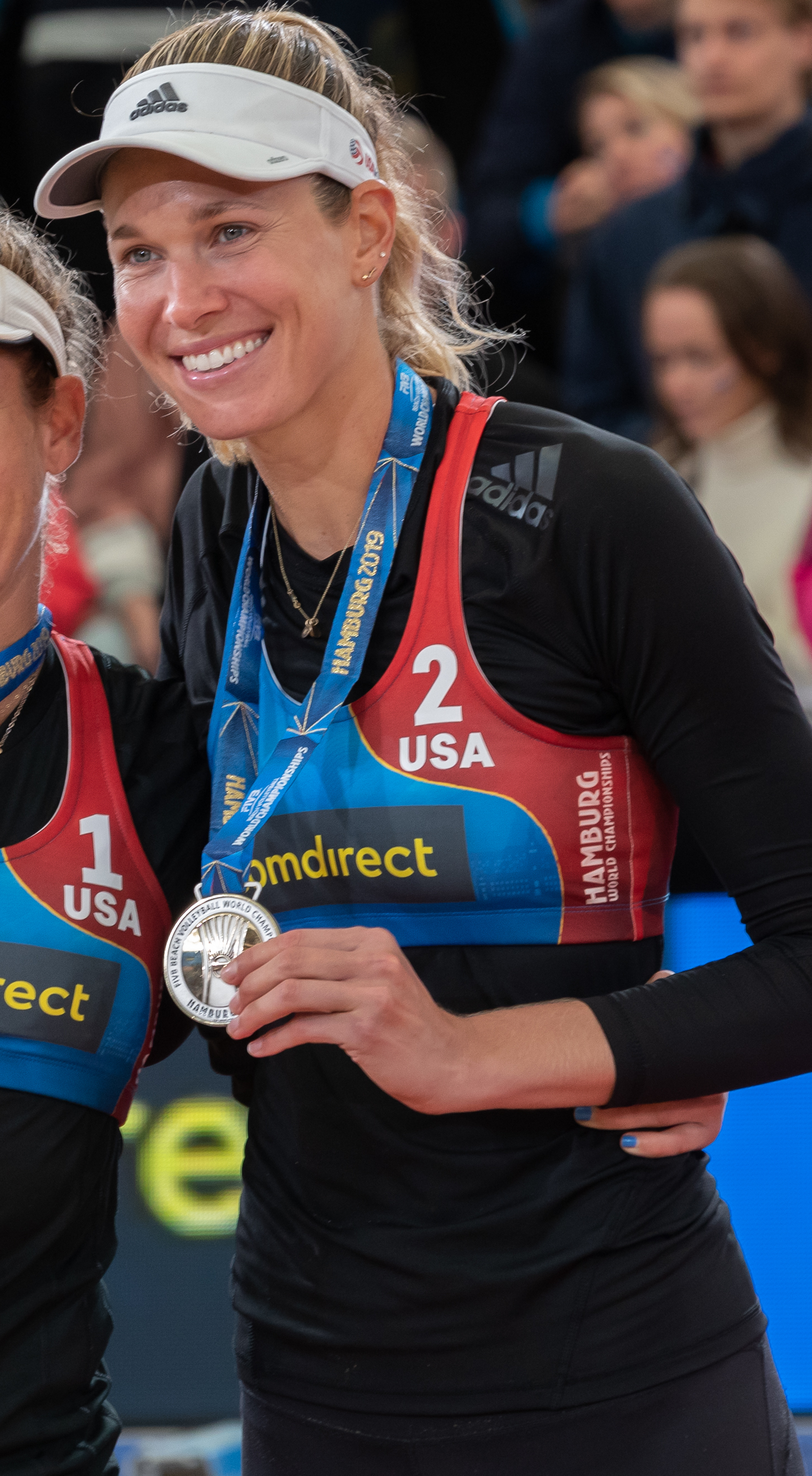
Alix Klineman (pictured in 2019), 2010 winner

Volleyball Academic All-America Team Members of the Year (1987–2010)
Year	University Division		College Division		Ref
Year	Winner	School	Winner	School	Ref
1987	Teri McGrath	Pacific	Dawn Dunlop	Air Force	
1988	Virginia Stahr	Nebraska	Anne McArthur	Catawba	
1989	Virginia Stahr	Nebraska	Toni St. Clair	Muskingum	
1990	Janet Kruse	Nebraska	Cynthia Capp	West Virginia Wesleyan	
1990	Janet Kruse	Nebraska	Robin Pals	Northwestern (IA)	
1991	Janet Kruse	Nebraska	Christine Muehlbauer	Saint Benedict	
1992	Lisa Pikalek	Virginia Tech	Amy Sullivan	Washington (IL)	
1993	Katie Haller	USC	Amy Sullivan	Washington (IL)	
1994	Nikki Nicholson	Georgia	Amy Albers	Washington (IL)	
1995	Nikki Nicholson	Georgia	Loretta Zahn	Kean	
1996	Jill Burness	Texas Tech	Carrie Ferguson	Capital	
1997	Kristin Folkl	Stanford	Tanya Klebe	Rochester	
1998	Bonnie Bremner	Penn State	Stephanie Rickards	Moravian	
1999	Bonnie Bremner	Penn State	Ushi Patel	RIT	
2000	Tamara Luchenmeyer	UTSA	Deanna Behnfeldt	Findlay	
2001	Nancy Metcalf	Nebraska	Laura Hall	IUP	
2002	Karla Kuverkova	American	Laura Hall	IUP	
2003	Karla Kuverkova	American	Nici Workman	Capital	
2004	Ogonna Nnamani	Stanford	Carli Dale†	Juniata	
2005	Kate Duchek	Xavier	Lindsay Harksen	Linfield	
2006	Sarah Pavan†	Nebraska	Rebecca Brezovec	Wingate	
2007	Sarah Pavan†	Nebraska	Kelly Downs	Elizabethtown	
2008	Yael Averbuch	North Carolina	Katy Tafler	Grand Valley State	
2009	Megan Hodge	Penn State	Maria Omondi	Columbia (MO)	
2010	Alix Klineman	Stanford	Brittany Donelan	Heidelberg	

=== Four-division era (2011–present) ===
Volleyball Academic All-America Team Members of the Year (2011–present)
Year	Division I		Division II		Division III		College/NAIA (Note: College Division, 2011–2017; NAIA, 2018–present)		Ref
Year	Winner	School	Winner	School	Winner	School	Winner	School	Ref
2011	Kristy Jaeckel	Florida	Keala Peterson	Sonoma State	Rebecca Kamp	Calvin	Paula Ferreira	Columbia (MO)	
2012	Ariel Turner	Purdue	Jennifer Costello	Missouri S&T	Lizzie Kamp	Calvin	Paula Ferreira	Columbia (MO)	
2013	Katie Slay	Penn State	Hannah Heeter	Clarion	Tessa Smolinski	Springfield (MA)	Taryn Nash	Spring Hill	
2014	Krista Vansant	Washington	Laura Subject	Clarion	Maggie Kamp	Calvin	Wanessa Siqueira†	Park	
2015	Avery Acker	SMU	Berkley Whaley	Tampa	Maggie Kamp	Calvin	Karlie Schut	Northwestern (IA)	
2016	Amy Boswell	BYU	Riley Hanson	Concordia (MN)	Sarah Szybist	RIT	Peiyi Liu	Columbia (MO)	
2017	Lily Johnson	Missouri State	Erica Whiteaker	Lincoln Memorial	Jenna Lodewyk	Calvin	Katie Placke	Hastings	
2018	Molly Kelly	Iowa	Erica Whiteaker	Lincoln Memorial	Abby Bertics†	MIT	Grace Blomstedt	Lindsey Wilson	
2019	Allie Barber	Marquette	Emily Conlin	Anderson (SC)	Sarah DeVries	Calvin	Rebecca Frick	Dakota Wesleyan	
2020	Meghan McClure	Stanford	Alexis Cardoza	Cal State San Bernardino	Hunter Weiss	Saint Benedict	Giovanna Tapigliani†	Missouri Baptist	
2021	Kenzie Koerber	BYU	Faith Rottinghaus	Washburn	Natalie Aston	Johns Hopkins	Giovanna Tapigliani†	Missouri Baptist	
2022	McKenna Melville	UCF	Rylee Hladky	MSU Denver	Heidi Westra	Calvin	Cambree Scott	Eastern Oregon	
2023	Logan Case	Western Michigan	Maureen Reilly	Rockhurst	Taylor McInerney	Lebanon Valley	Ady Dwight	Dakota Wesleyan	
2024	Anna DeBeer	Louisville	Teagan Starkey	Concordia (MN)	Olivia Foley	Juniata	Eva Joldersma	Indiana Wesleyan	
2025	Bergen Reilly	Nebraska	Makenna Nold	Concordia (MN)	Graycee Mosley†	East Texas Baptist	Zavyr Metzger	Northwestern (IA)	
