= Michael Sealy =

American volleyball coach

Personal information
- Nickname: Mike
- Born: January 28, 1971 (age 55); California, USA
- Hometown: Santa Monica, California, U.S.

Coaching information
Previous teams coached
Years	Teams
2000; 2001; 2003–2006; 2005; 2006–2009; 2010–2022	CSUN Men's (Assistant Coach); UCLA Men's (Assistant Coach); UCLA Men's (Assistant Coach); UCLA Women's (Assistant Coach); Hawaii Women's (Associate Head Coach); UCLA Women's

Best results
Years	Location	Result
1993; 2011	NCAA national championship (Player); NCAA national championship (Head Coach)	1st 1st

Michael Sealy (born January 28, 1971) is an American volleyball coach. He was the head coach of the women's volleyball team at UCLA from 2010–2022. He stepped down from the position in December 2022, after UCLA failed to qualify to the NCAA tournament for the third time during his tenure.

== Player ==
Sealy graduated from Santa Monica High School in 1989 and went on to play on the UCLA Bruins men's volleyball team. He helped the Bruins win the NCAA national championship in 1993 during his senior year.

== Coaching ==
In his second year as a head coach, Sealy took the Bruins to the championship game and captured their fourth title in history by defeating Illinois 3-1 on December 17, 2011 at the Alamodome in San Antonio, Texas. The Bruins were seeded 9th in the NCAA championship tournament. En route to the title game, they defeated defending champions Penn State and No. 1 seeded Texas to face No. 3 seeded Illinois. Rachael Kidder was named the most outstanding player of the tournament. Lauren Van Orden and Zoe Nightingale were also named to the all tournament team. He is now a champion both as a player and a head coach. Sealy was also a former Assistant Coach at the University of Hawaii under Hall of Famer Dave Shoji. He helped guide the Rainbow Wahine to the National Semi-final in 2009 in Tampa, Florida.

== Honors and awards ==
- NCAA All-American at UCLA in 1991 to 1993
- NCAA national champion at UCLA and Co-MVP in 1993
- 2011 AVCA Coach of the Year
