= Anders Nelson =

American volleyball coach

Current position
- Title: Head coach
- Team: Vanderbilt
- Conference: SEC
- Record: 30–21

Biographical details
- Born: November 14, 1987 (age 39); Chisago City, Minnesota, U.S.
- Education: Ball State; Kentucky (MBA)

Playing career
- 2008: Minnesota (club)
- 2009–2011: Ball State
- Position: Middle blocker

Coaching career (HC unless noted)
- 2011: Kentucky (volunteer assistant)
- 2012: Arkansas (assistant)
- 2013–2016: Kentucky (assistant)
- 2017–2022: Kentucky (associate HC)
- 2022 (Note: Nelson was appointed in December 2022 to build Vanderbilt's inaugural volleyball program; official NCAA competition began in the 2025 season.)–present: Vanderbilt

Accomplishments and honors

Awards
- SEC Coach of the Year (2026)

Anders James Nelson (born November 14, 1987) is an American volleyball coach and former player. He was named the head coach of Vanderbilt women's volleyball team in December 2022, with official NCAA competition starting in the 2025 season. Vanderbilt announced the addition of volleyball as its 17th varsity sport, as the program was originally discontinued after the 1979–80 academic year.

== Early life, education, and playing career ==
Nelson was born on November 14, 1987, in Chisago City, Minnesota to Mark and Laurie Nelson. He was raised in St. Croix Falls, Wisconsin. He did not play volleyball in high school at St. Croix Falls High School, but did play basketball, baseball and cross country, earning MVP honors three times for the basketball team.

Nelson is a 2011 graduate of Ball State University, where he graduated summa cum laude with a finance and accounting degree. He earned a Master of Business Administration from Kentucky in May 2018 and is married to his husband, Mark Hemberger. Nelson started college at the University of Minnesota, where he played for their men's club team. Eventually, Nelson played three seasons of NCAA Division I men's volleyball as a middle blocker for Ball State University. In his final season in 2011, he was named to the AVCA All-America Second Team.

== Coaching career ==
Nelson spent 11 seasons in various coaching positions for Kentucky, first as an assistant coach and later as associate head coach for seven seasons. Nelson helped guide the Wildcats to the NCAA tournament in each of his 11 seasons, highlighted with the team winning the 2020 NCAA title, its first in program history.

In April 2022, Vanderbilt announced the addition of volleyball as its 17th varsity sport. The program was originally discontinued after the 1979–80 academic year. Anders was officially named head coach in December 2022. Nelson was named the 2026 SEC Coach of the Year after leading the Commodores to a 2nd place conference finish and a 21-3 overall regular season record. The 2026 team also reached a national ranking as high as no. 14 during the season.

== Head coaching record ==
Record table
Season	Team	Overall	Conference	Standing	Postseason
Vanderbilt Commodores (Southeastern Conference) (2025–present)
2025	Vanderbilt	9–18	3–12	15th	
2026	Vanderbilt	21–3	12–3	T–2nd	
Vanderbilt:		30–21 (.588)	15–15 (.500)		
Total:		30–21 (.588)			
