= Andy Banachowski =

American volleyball coach (born 1945)

Personal information
- Born: August 1945 (age 81); San Mateo, California, U.S.
- Education: UCLA

Coaching information
Previous teams coached
Teams
UCLA 1965-1968, 1970–2009

Best results
Years
1972
1974
1975
1976
1978
1981
1983
1984
1990
1991
1992
1994
Location
DGWS National Championship
AIAW National Championship
AIAW National Championship
AIAW National Championship
AIAW National Championship
NCAA National Championship
NCAA National Championship
NCAA National Championship
NCAA National Championship
NCAA National Championship
NCAA National Championship
NCAA National Championship
Result
1st
1st
1st
2nd
2nd
2nd
2nd
1st
1st
1st
2nd
2nd
- Last updated: April 17, 2008

John Andrew Banachowski (born August 1945) is an American volleyball coach. He was the head coach of the women's volleyball team at UCLA (1965–1968; 1970–2009). He had more wins than any other Division I coach, with 1,106 total victories and an overall record since the 1970 season of 1,106-301 (.786), until his record was broken on September 6, 2013, by University of Hawaii head coach Dave Shoji. He did not coach the two seasons from 1968 to 1970 after his graduation from UCLA. Under his coaching, the UCLA team won six national championships (3 NCAA–1984, 1990, 1991; 2 AIAW–1974, 1975; and 1 DGWS–1972). Banachowski was twice an All-American volleyball player at UCLA under Al Scates, and won USVBA national championships in 1965 and 1967 as a player. While at UCLA he joined Delta Tau Delta International Fraternity.

He got his 1,000th career victory on Nov. 12, 2005, becoming the first Division I women's coach to reach 1,000 career victories when the Bruins handed eventual national champion Washington its only loss of the season in a five-game thriller at Pauley Pavilion. On January 11, 2010, he announced his retirement, effective June 30.

Originally from San Mateo, Banachowski now resides in Los Angeles. He has two children.

== Coaching at UCLA ==
=== 1981-2010 ===
Since NCAA began sponsoring women's sports in 1981, UCLA women's volleyball has earned 37 AVCA All-American honors, to go with 47 Volleyball Monthly/Magazine All-American awards. Banachowski has also coached players to numerous other awards, including 43 All-Pacific Region honors, 85 All-Pacific-10 awards, five Pac-10 Players of the Year and the National Player of the Year in 1992 (Natalie Williams). Eighteen Bruins have earned All-NCAA Tournament accolades, including Williams, who was named Most Outstanding Player in both 1990 and 1991. Williams also won two Honda Awards under Banachowski's tutelage in 1992 and `93, with Lis Masakayan earning the honor in 1985.

=== 1980s ===
In 1988, Banachowski received his first Pac-10 Coach of the Year honors. In 1989, he received his second straight Pac-10 honor, as well as being named the AVCA National Coach of the Year.

In the 1984 NCAA Championship match against Stanford, UCLA marked one of the best comebacks in a single game. In the fifth and deciding game after splitting the first four games with the Cardinal, UCLA was down 11-2. In a fifth game, you had to reach 15 points to win the match. With heroics from Lis Masakayan, the Bruins were able to come up from being down 9 points and win the match and national championship, 15-12. This was before rally-scoring era, which would have made it much more unlikely that the Bruins would have pulled the comeback. Nonetheless, it was considered one of the best comebacks in a fifth game.

=== 1990s ===
UCLA won their 2nd NCAA title in 1990 by defeating Pacific, 3-0 in College Park, Maryland.

If the 1984 comeback wasn't enough, they weren't finished with come from behind wins in national championship matches. In 1991, playing on their home court at Pauley Pavilion, the Bruins saw opponent Long Beach State take a commanding 2-0 game lead on them. With Long Beach being able to win the championship if they won the 3rd or 4th games, UCLA rallied back and took the next to games to force a fifth. They won the championship by winning the fifth game, pulling off one of the best comebacks in NCAA history.

On Oct. 24, 1997, Banachowski became the first women's volleyball coach in history to be inducted into the National Volleyball Hall of Fame as a coach. He has since become the first volleyball inductee into the Serra High School and San Mateo County Halls of Fame.

=== 2000s ===
Aside from Banachowski earning his 1,000th career victory in 2005, a year later Banachowski led the team to their first 30-win season and final four appearance since 1994. Banachowski was inducted into the AVCA Hall of Fame in 2003.

Since 1981, the Bruins have appeared in 11 Final Fours, winning championships in 1984, 1990 and 1991 and earning runner-up finishes in 1981, 1983, 1992 and 1994.

== Olympic coaching ==
Banachowski has been involved with the U.S. Olympic Team as a coach many times. He is a former advisor with the U.S. National Team, helping teams during the 1990 Goodwill Games, the 1992 Summer Olympics in Barcelona, Spain, the 1995 Pan-American Games in Argentina and the 1996 Summer Olympics in Atlanta. Additionally, he coached the West Team in the 1986 U.S. Olympic Festival. In 1993, Banachowski was the head coach of the U.S. World University Games squad, a group which achieved the highest American finish in WUG history, earning a silver medal in Buffalo, New York

== Honors and awards ==
- 2009 National Polish-American Sports Hall of Fame, Troy, Mich.
- 2006 AVCA Coach of the Year, Pacific Region Coach of the Year, Volleyball Magazine Coach of the Year
- 2003 AVCA Hall of Fame induction
- 2000 USA Volleyball All-time great coach, George L. Fisher "Leader in volleyball" award
- 1998 Pacific Region Coach of the Year, Pac-10 Coach of the Year
- 1997 Induction into the National Volleyball Hall of Fame (coach)
- 1994 Pac-10 Coach of the Year
- 1993 Pacific Region Coach of the Year, Pac-10 Coach of the Year
- 1992 Pacific Region Coach of the Year
- 1989 AVCA Coach of the Year, Pacific Region Coach of the Year, Pac-10 Coach of the Year
- 1988 Pac-10 Coach of the Year

== See also ==
- List of college women's volleyball coaches with 700 wins
