= Peggie Gillom-Granderson =

US basketball player and chaplain

Peggie Gillom-Granderson (born April 14, 1958) is a chaplain at the University of Mississippi since 2009. Before starting her religious position, Gillom played on the Ole Miss Rebels women's basketball team between 1976 and 1980. During her time at Ole Miss, Gillom set career records for Mississippi with 2,486 points and 1,271 rebounds. After university, Gillom briefly played in the Women's Professional Basketball League for a year with the Dallas Diamonds. As an assistant coach, Gillom worked with Ole Miss from 1981 to 1997 before continuing her assistant coaching tenure in the Women's National Basketball Association. With the Houston Comets, Gillom and her team won the 1997 WNBA Championship.

As a head coach, Gillom had 63 wins and 86 losses with the Texas A&M Aggies women's basketball team between 1998 and 2003. She later returned to Mississippi in 2003 to become the associate head coach for their women's basketball team and remained in the position until 2008. Apart from university basketball, Gillom was an assistant coach of the American women's basketball team that won bronze at the 1999 Pan American Games and gold at the 2000 Summer Olympics. Gillom was inducted into the Mississippi Sports Hall of Fame in 1998 and the Women's Basketball Hall of Fame in 2013.

== Early life and education ==
On April 14, 1958, Peggie Gillom was born in Abbeville, Mississippi. Gillom played basketball during her childhood and continued to play in high school. Between 1976 and 1980, Gillom played on the Ole Miss Rebels women's basketball team. During this time period, Gillom co-captained the women's basketball team alongside Renee Rutland from 1979 to 1980. She also received nominations for the Wade Trophy in 1979 and 1980.

While at Ole Miss, Gillom and her team won the Mississippi state championship held by the Association for Intercollegiate Athletics for Women in 1978 and 1979. She also participated at the 1978 AIAW National Large College Basketball Championship. After setting career records with 2,486 points and 1,271 rebounds, Gillom's records with the University of Mississippi remained for almost 40 years. In 1980, Gillom graduated from Ole Miss with a Bachelor of Social Work.

== Career ==
From 1980 to 1981, Gillom played in the Women's Professional Basketball League with the Dallas Diamonds. In 1981, Gillom became an assistant coach for the women's basketball team at Ole Miss and remained in her position until 1997. In 1997, Gillom was an assistant coach for Van Chancellor when the Houston Comets started their first season in the Women's National Basketball Association. While with the Comets, Gillom was part of the coaching team that won the 1997 WNBA Championship.

Gillom remained with the Comets until she was selected as the head coach for the Texas A&M Aggies women's basketball team in June 1998. During her tenure between 1998 and 2003, Gillom had 63 wins and 86 losses. While at Texas A&M, Gillom was an assistant coach for the American women's basketball team that won bronze at the 1999 Pan American Games and gold at the 2000 Summer Olympics. In 2003, Gillom returned to the University of Mississippi as the women's basketball associate head coach under Carol Ross. She remained with Mississippi until she decided to retire from her coaching position in 2009. After ending her basketball career, Gillom-Granderson became a chaplain for the sportswomen at Ole Miss that year and continued to hold her religious position throughout the 2010s.

== Personal life and honors ==
Gillom was married in 2005. In 2008, the Mississippi Sports Hall of Fame first started awarding the C Spire Gillom Trophy for the best yearly women's college basketball player in Mississippi. Gillom was named into the Ole Miss Athletics Hall of Fame in 1996. Other hall of fame inductions include the Mississippi Sports Hall of Fame in 1998 and the Women's Basketball Hall of Fame in 2013. The Gillom Athletics Performance Center on the Ole Miss campus is named for Gillom-Granderson and her sister Jennifer Gillom, also an Ole Miss former outstanding player.
