= Brent Crouch =

American volleyball coach (born 1975)

Current position
- Title: Head coach
- Team: Auburn
- Conference: SEC
- Record: 101–79 (.561)

Biographical details
- Born: January 8, 1975 (age 51); Dallas, Texas, U.S.
- Education: Texas A&M (B.A., M.A.); Oregon (Ph.D)

Coaching career (HC unless noted)
- 2006–2008: San Diego City College (men's)
- 2010–2013: Saint Mary's (CA) (indoor; assistant)
- 2013: Saint Mary's (CA) (beach)
- 2014–2017: Portland
- 2018–2019: USC
- 2020–present: Auburn

Accomplishments and honors

Awards
- AVCA South Region Coach of the Year (2022); West Coast Conference Coach of the Year (2016)

J. Brent Crouch (born January 8, 1975) is an American volleyball coach, professor, and former indoor and beach volleyball player. He has been the head coach of Auburn Tigers women's volleyball team since 2020.

== Personal life ==
Crouch earned a bachelor's degree in history in 1998 and a master's in philosophy in 2000, both from Texas A&M, then went on to earn a doctorate in philosophy from Oregon in 2006. While a student at Texas A&M, he played for the school's club team from 1993 to 1997 and was named MVP of the Stephen F. Austin Tournament in 1997. He also competed on the beach from 2005 to 2007 in AVP and CBVA events and placed second at the 2005 California Cup state championship.

Outside of volleyball, he has held various teaching positions in philosophy at Oregon, San Diego City College, and Saint Mary's (CA) since 2000.

Crouch and his wife Marcy have two sons.

== Coaching career ==
=== St. Mary's (CA) ===
Crouch was the assistant coach at St. Mary's (CA) from 2010 to 2013 for the indoor team and served as the head coach for the beach team in the 2012 inaugural season. The beach team garnered an 8–2 record, a No. 9 national ranking, and a bid to the AVCA national championship for the program's top pairs team.

During his time with the program, Saint Mary's went 73–40, finished top-3 in the WCC standings in each season and earned a berth into the NCAA Tournament in 2012.

=== Portland ===
Crouch's first head coach role for an indoor NCAA Division I program began in 2014, when he inherited a winless program in Portland. The team improved each year and Crouch was named the West Coast Conference Coach of the Year in 2016 after the program had its winningest season in 25 years.

=== USC ===
Crouch was named the head coach at USC in 2018, succeeding previous head coach Mick Haley. In his two seasons at USC, the team advanced to the NCAA tournament, losing in the second round both years. Crouch coached 3 AVCA All Americans at USC (Brooke Botkin, 2018; Raquel Lazaro, 2018; Khalia Lanier, 2018 & 2019).

Crouch resigned from the program following the 2019 season.

=== Auburn ===
Crouch was named head coach of Auburn on January 14, 2020.

In 2022, Crouch was named the AVCA South Region Coach of the Year after leading Auburn to a 22–9 overall record, 10–8 mark in the SEC and a sixth-place finish. Auburn's 22 victories were the most in the rally-scoring era and the most the program had since 1998. The Tigers earned a second time in program history and the first since 2010, the Tigers earned a berth to the NCAA Tournament for the first time since 2010 and only the second time in program history. Auburn upset 14th ranked Creighton in the first round, earning its first win over a ranked opponent since 2017, before losing to Houston in five sets in the second round.

=== Other coaching works ===
Before coaching collegiately, Crouch held various coaching roles for girls' high school club teams and men's college club teams from 2004 to 2009. He was head coach of the San Diego City College men's team from 2006 to 2008 after serving as the head coach of Oregon's men's club team in 2004 and 2005. Crouch also has coaching experience with the USA Volleyball program. He was an assistant with the U.S. Collegiate National Team that captured a gold medal at the 2016 U22 Global Challenge and served as both an indoor and beach coach in the USA Volleyball High Performance program.

== Head coaching record ==
Record table
Season	Team	Overall	Conference	Standing	Postseason
Portland Pilots (WCC) (2014–2017)
2014	Portland	7–23	1–17	10th	
2015	Portland	16–15	6–12	8th	
2016	Portland	17–13	10–8	T–3rd	
2017	Portland	15–15	6–12	8th	
Portland:		55–66 (.455)	23–49 (.319)		
USC Trojans (Pac-12) (2018–2019)
2018	USC	22–11	13–7	T–2nd	NCAA second round
2019	USC	18–14	11–9	6th	NCAA second round
USC:		40–25 (.615)	24–16 (.600)		
Auburn (SEC) (2020–present)
2020	Auburn	0–8	0–8	13th	
2021	Auburn	13–15	5–13	11th	
2022	Auburn	22–9	10–8	6th	NCAA second round
2023	Auburn	20–10	10–8	T–4th	NCAA first round
2024	Auburn	14–13	4–12	14th	
2025	Auburn	17–11	7–8	T–8th	
2026	Auburn	15–12	5–10	T–11th	
Auburn:		101–79 (.561)	41–67 (.380)		
Total:		196–169 (.537)			
