= Gillom Trophy =

- Awarded for: The best women's college basketball player in the state of Mississippi
- Location: Mississippi
- Country: United States
- Presented by: Mississippi Sports Hall of Fame
- First award: 2008
- Currently held by: Madison Scott, Ole Miss
- Website: Mississippi Sports Hall of Fame

The Gillom Trophy or C Spire Gillom Trophy is an award given annually to the best women's college basketball player in the state of Mississippi by the Mississippi Sports Hall of Fame. It is open to players from all four-year colleges in Mississippi.

The trophy is named after former Ole Miss Rebels women's basketball player Peggie Gillom-Granderson.

== Winners ==
Year	Winner	Pos	School
2007–08	Jennifer Rushing	G	Delta State
2008–09	Alexis Rack	G	Mississippi State
2009–10	Alexis Rack (2)	G	Mississippi State
2010–11	Veronica Walker	F	Delta State
2011–12	Veronica Walker (2)	F	Delta State
2012–13	Martha Alwal	F	Mississippi State
2013–14	Jamierra Faulkner	G	Southern Miss
2014–15	Victoria Vivians	G	Mississippi State
2015–16	Victoria Vivians (2)	G	Mississippi State
2016–17	Victoria Vivians (3)	G	Mississippi State
2017–18	Victoria Vivians (4)	G	Mississippi State
2018–19	Teaira McCowan	C	Mississippi State
2019–20	Rickea Jackson	F	Mississippi State
2020–21	Shakira Austin	C	Ole Miss
2021–22	Shakira Austin (2)	C	Ole Miss
2022–23	Angel Baker	G	Ole Miss
2023–24	Jessika Carter	C	Mississippi State
2024–25	Madison Scott	F	Ole Miss
2025–26	Cotie McMahon	F	Ole Miss

== Trophies won by school ==
Rank	School	Wins
1	Mississippi State	10
2	Ole Miss	4
3	Delta State	3
4	Southern Miss	1

== See also ==
Other annual awards presented by the Mississippi Sports Hall of Fame for the best players in that state:

- Howell Trophy – given to the best men's college basketball player
- C Spire Ferriss Trophy – given to the best college baseball player
- Conerly Trophy – given to the best overall college football player
- Hull Trophy – given to the best college football offensive lineman
