= Gillom Athletics Performance Center =

Indoor arena at the University of Mississippi

- Interactive map of Gillom Athletics Performance Center
- Location: 972 Hathorn Rd; Oxford, Mississippi
- Coordinates: 34.35855°N 89.54450°W
- Owner: University of Mississippi
- Operator: University of Mississippi
- Capacity: 1,035

Construction
- Groundbreaking: 1996
- Opened: 1997
- Architects: Michael W. Taylor, AIA
- Builder: Zellner Construction

Tenant
- Ole Miss Rebels women's volleyball

The Gillom Athletics Performance Center is 1,035 seat indoor arena on the University of Mississippi campus in Oxford, Mississippi. It has been the home of Ole Miss Rebels women's volleyball since 1997. The building was named for Ole Miss basketball legends Peggie and Jennifer Gillom. In addition to the volleyball team, the building houses offices and locker rooms for the rifle, soccer, and softball teams. The building underwent renovations in 2010 and 2017.
