= Neville Arena =

Arena on the Auburn University campus

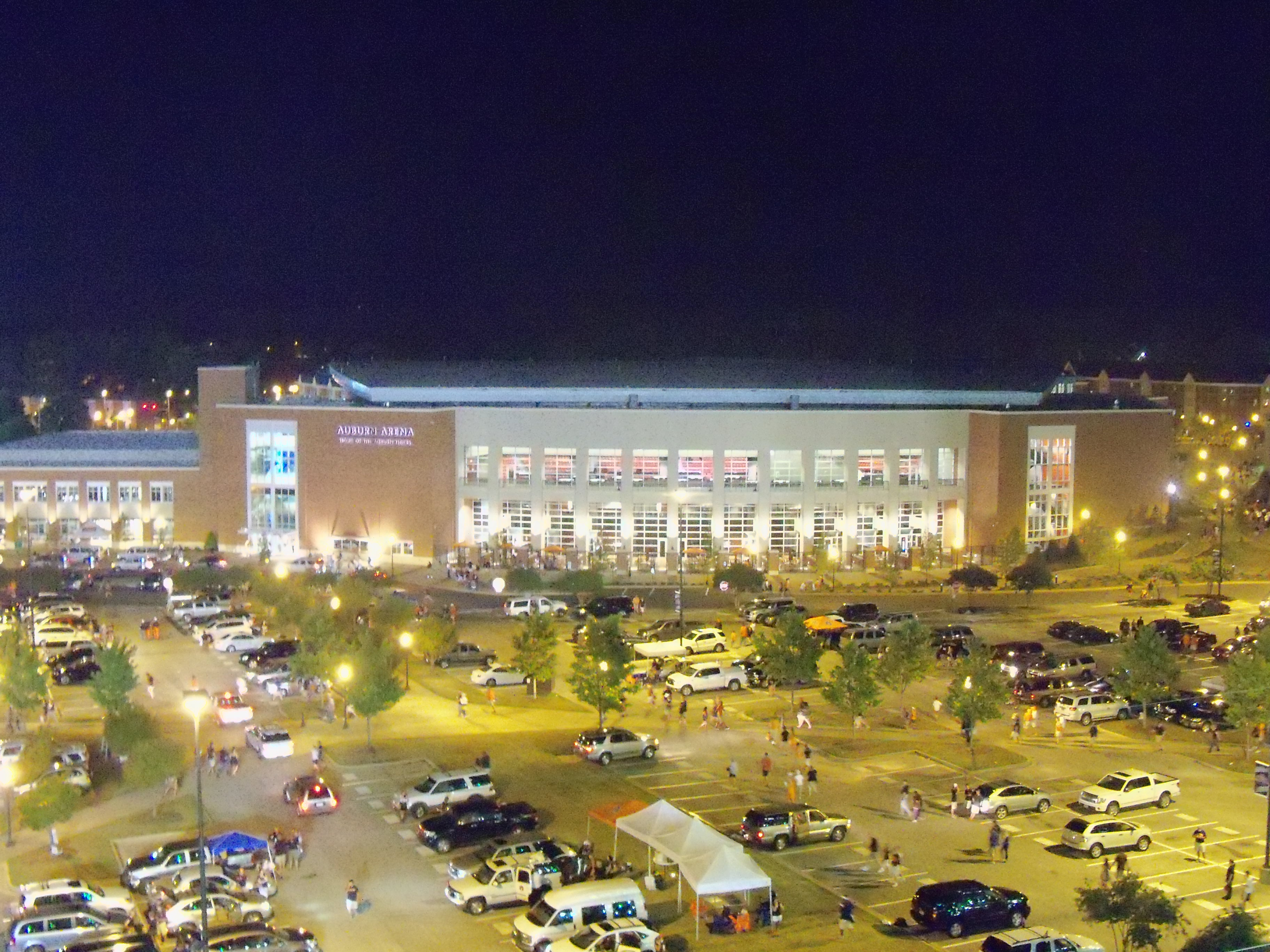
- Interactive map of Neville Arena
- Former names: Auburn Arena (2010–2022)
- Location: 250 Beard-Eaves Court; Auburn, AL 36849
- Coordinates: 32.60253°N 85.49301°W
- Owner: Auburn University
- Operator: Auburn University
- Capacity: Basketball: 9,121; Gymnastics: 7,424; Volleyball: 2,000
- Record attendance: 9,121 (Men's basketball); 7,720 (Women's basketball)

Construction
- Groundbreaking: August 29, 2008
- Opened: October 15, 2010
- Cost: $86 million ($127 million in 2025 dollars)
- Architects: 360 Architecture; Davis Architects, Inc.
- Structural engineer: Walter P Moore
- Services engineer: Smith Seckman Reid Inc.
- General contractors: B.L. Harbert/Robins & Morton

Tenants
- Auburn Tigers (NCAA); Men's basketball (2010–present); Women's basketball (2010–present); Women's gymnastics (2010–present); Women's volleyball (2013–present)

Neville Arena, formerly Auburn Arena also known as The Jungle, is a 9,121-seat multi-purpose arena in Auburn, Alabama, on the campus of Auburn University. Built in 2010 to replace Beard–Eaves–Memorial Coliseum, the $86 million facility is the home of the Auburn Tigers men's and women's basketball, women's gymnastics, and women's volleyball teams. It is located on the west side of the Auburn campus, near Wire Road between Thach Avenue and Heisman Drive. Aside from the main court, the arena also contains two practice courts, a weight room, 12 suites, coaches offices, the Auburn Ticket Office, and the Lovelace Athletic Museum. The outside of the arena features a large monument to the Auburn Creed and a statue of former Auburn men's basketball player Charles Barkley.

== History ==
On June 29, 2007, Auburn University announced plans to build a new $92.5 million (eventually completed under budget at $86 million) basketball arena and practice facilities to replace Beard-Eaves-Memorial Coliseum. Auburn held a groundbreaking ceremony for the new facility 13 months later on August 29, 2008.

Auburn held a ribbon-cutting ceremony for Auburn Arena on October 15, 2010. That night Auburn held the official grand opening for the new arena. Many celebrities were in attendance, including former Auburn men's basketball player Charles Barkley. The event concluded with a Harlem Globetrotters game.

The Auburn men's and women's basketball teams played their first competitive games in Auburn Arena in a doubleheader on November 12, 2010. The women's team defeated Mercer 79–61, and the men's team lost to UNC Asheville 70–69 in overtime. The men's first win in Auburn Arena came three games later in a 68–66 win over Middle Tennessee.

On October 22, 2016, Auburn announced that it plans to build a statue of former men's basketball player Charles Barkley to be displayed outside of Auburn Arena. The statue was unveiled on November 25, 2017, on the morning of the 2017 Iron Bowl.

On February 8, 2022, the Auburn Athletics Department announced that Auburn Arena's name would be changed to Neville Arena in recognition of the single largest gift in Auburn Athletics history by donors Bill and Connie Neville. The dedication for the official name change took place on March 4, 2022. In addition, Auburn initiated plans for construction of a new practice gym and renovation of the existing practice gym at the Arena.

== Auburn basketball ==
=== Notable games ===
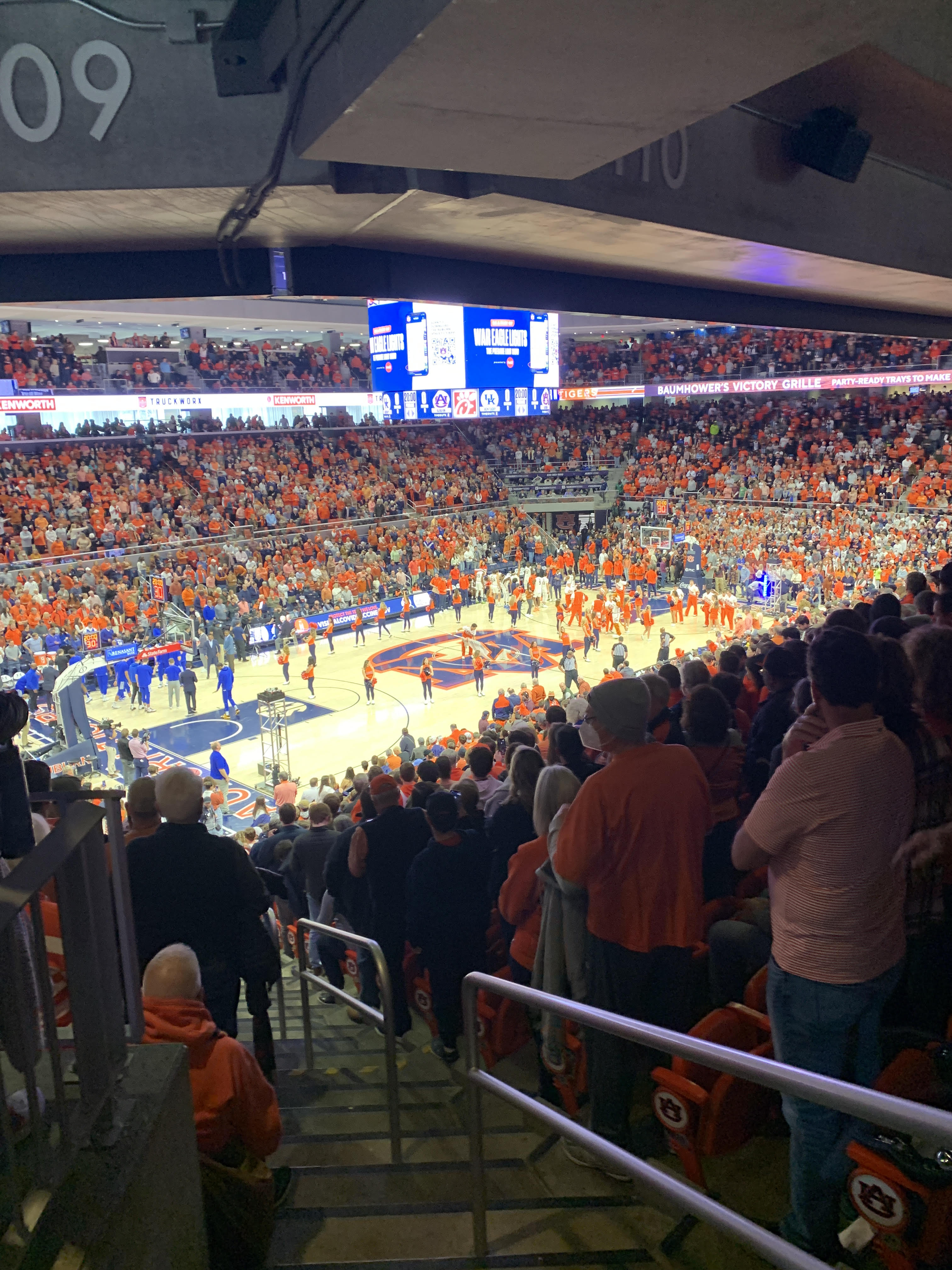
- Neville Arena prior to the 2022 game against Kentucky.
  November 12, 2010 - UNC Asheville 70, Auburn 69 (OT): UNC Asheville defeated Auburn in the first ever men's basketball game played in Auburn Arena.
- November 21, 2010 - Auburn 68, Middle Tennessee 66: Auburn defeated Middle Tennessee for their first ever win in Auburn Arena.
- February 6, 2013 - Auburn 49, Alabama 37: Auburn defeated rival Alabama for the first time in Auburn Arena. Former Auburn quarterback Cam Newton cheered on the Tigers from the front row of The Jungle during the game.
- January 16, 2016 - Auburn 75, Kentucky 70: Auburn defeated #14 Kentucky, snapping Auburn's 18-game losing streak against the Wildcats. The Auburn students stormed the court for the first time in Auburn Arena at the end of the game.
- March 3, 2018 - Auburn 79, South Carolina 70: #19 Auburn defeated South Carolina in the last regular season game of the year, clinching a share of the 2018 SEC regular season championship.
- February 1, 2020 - Auburn 75, Kentucky 66: ESPN's College GameDay visited Auburn for the first time ever, where #17 Auburn defeated #13 Kentucky.
- February 8, 2020 - Auburn 91, LSU 90 (OT): Despite trailing #18 LSU by 8 points with a little over a minute left in regulation, #11 Auburn came back to tie the game and send it into overtime. Auburn took an early lead in overtime, but LSU scored with 9 seconds left to take the lead back. Auburn's J'von McCormick drove the length of the floor and hit the game-winning shot with 0.1 seconds to go.
- January 22, 2022 - Auburn 80, Kentucky 71: In anticipation of an early Saturday matchup between #2 Auburn and #12 Kentucky, Auburn students camped out in sub-freezing temperatures starting day before in order to get into the game. Auburn defeated Kentucky en route to earning their first ever #1 ranking in the next AP poll. After the game, Auburn head coach Bruce Pearl dubbed the student campout "Pearlville." Students would camp out in Pearlville for other home games later in the season.
- March 5, 2022 - Auburn 82, South Carolina 71: #5 Auburn defeated South Carolina in the last regular season game of the year, clinching the 2022 SEC regular season championship outright. This was also the first men's basketball game played in the arena after it was renamed Neville Arena.

=== Average attendance by season ===
Season	Men's	Women's
2010–11	6,324	3,006
2011–12	6,502	2,501
2012–13	6,257	2,098
2013–14	5,823	2,250
2014–15	7,825	2,055
2015–16	8,216	2,562
2016–17	7,833	2,297
2017–18	8,221	2,139
2018–19	8,156	1,947
2019–20	8,866	1,843
2020–21	1,824	562
2021–22	9,121	1,977
Average	7,050	2,112

== Events ==
=== Non-Auburn sporting events ===
Auburn Arena hosted games for the first and second rounds of the 2011 NCAA Women's Division I Basketball Tournament.

=== Concerts ===
Since it opened in 2010, Neville Arena has hosted concerts featuring many artists across many different genres. The following is a list of all artists that have performed in Neville Arena.

- The Avett Brothers
- B.o.B
- The Band Perry
- Ben Rector
- Cole Swindell
- Girl Talk
- Green River Ordinance
- Hot Chelle Rae
- Ludacris
- Lupe Fiasco
- Needtobreathe
- The Neighbourhood
- Train
- Young the Giant
- Riley Green

== See also ==
- List of NCAA Division I basketball arenas
