= Tennessee Lady Volunteers volleyball =

American collegiate volleyball team

- Founded: 1973
- University: University of Tennessee
- Athletic director: Danny White
- Head coach: Eve Rackham (9th season)
- Conference: SEC
- Location: Knoxville, Tennessee, US
- Home arena: Thompson–Boling Arena (capacity: 21,678)
- Nickname: Lady Volunteers
- Colors: Orange, white, and smokey gray

AIAW/NCAA tournament semifinal
- 2005

AIAW/NCAA Regional Final
- 2005

AIAW/NCAA regional semifinal
- 1982, 1983, 1984, 2004, 2005, 2023

AIAW/NCAA second round
- 1982, 1983, 1984, 1993, 2004, 2005, 2009, 2010, 2011, 2018, 2021, 2023

AIAW/NCAA tournament appearance
- 1971, 1972, 1973, 1977, 1979, 1980, 1981, 1982, 1983, 1984, 1993, 2000, 2004, 2005, 2006, 2008, 2009, 2010, 2011, 2012, 2018, 2021, 2022, 2023, 2024, 2025

Conference tournament champion
- 1981, 1982, 1984, 2004

Conference regular season champion
- 1981, 1982, 1984, 2004, 2011

The Tennessee Lady Volunteers volleyball is the team that represents the University of Tennessee located in Knoxville, Tennessee. The Volunteers (or "Vols") compete in Division I of the National Collegiate Athletic Association (NCAA) and the Southeastern Conference (SEC). The Volunteers play their home matches in the Thompson–Boling Arena on the university's campus, and are currently led by 9th-year head coach Eve Rackham.

Along with all of the other UT women's sports teams, it used the nickname "Lady Volunteers" (or the short form "Lady Vols") until the 2015–16 school year, when the school dropped the "Lady" prefix from the nicknames of all women's teams except in basketball. In late 2017 the university reinstated the “Lady Volunteer” nickname for all women's sports teams.

== History ==
=== Rob Patrick era ===
From 1997 until his retirement in 2017, Rob Patrick led the Lady Vols to 9 NCAA Tournaments, 2 SEC Championships, an SEC Tournament, and 11 20+ win seasons. One highlight of the Rob Patrick campaign came in 2004, when the Lady Vols set program records in wins (32), win percentage (.914), and claimed the SEC regular season and tournament championships. This success culminated in a #12 national seed and an NCAA Sweet 16 berth. The Lady Vols finished the 2004 season with a final record of 32-3 (15-1 SEC). The success rolled into 2005 as the Lady Vols made their deepest postseason appearance with their first and only NCAA Final Four appearance. Despite his accomplishments, the Lady Vols struggled during his final two years finishing a combined 29-29 and 12–24 in SEC play by the time Patrick retired in 2017.

=== Eve Rackham-Watt era ===
On January 10, 2018, former athletic director Phillip Fulmer announced Eve Rackham as the new head coach for the Lady Volunteers. In her first season as head coach, Rackham led the largest single season turnaround in program history, taking a team that finished 12-15 (5-13 SEC) the previous season to 26-6 (16-2 SEC) with a 2nd place SEC finish. Additionally, Rackham ended a 5-year postseason drought in 2018, and guided the Lady Vols to back-to-back NCAA tournaments for the first time since 2012 by qualifying in 2021 and 2022.

== Yearly Record ==
The University of Tennessee first fielded a women's varsity volleyball team in the fall of 1958 and first kept recordings of games in 1973. Since then, the Volunteers have won four Southeastern Conference (SEC) championships.

Year	Head coach	Overall record	SEC Record	SEC standing	Winning percentage	Postseason	
Year	Head coach	Overall record	SEC Record	SEC standing	Winning percentage	Postseason	(Independent) (1973–1978)
1973	Kaye Hart (1st)	38-6	—	—	.864	2nd Region II	
1974	Kaye Hart (2nd)	8-14	—	—	.364	—	
1975	Diane Hale (1st)	17-8-6	—	—	.645	—	
1976	Jodie Lambert (1st)	22-13-4	—	—	.615	—	
1977	Bud Fields (1st)	7-11-3	—	—	.405	4th Region II	
1978	Bud Fields (2nd)	20-14-3	—	—	.581	—	
(SEC) (1979–present)
1979	Bob Bertucci (1st)	34-11	4-2	2nd	.756	5th Region II	
1980	Bob Bertucci (2nd)	40-17	4-1	2nd	.696	2nd Region II	
1981	Bob Bertucci (3rd)	34-22	3-0	Champions	.607	NCAA First Round	
1982	Bob Bertucci (4th)	31–7	2-0	Champions	.816	NCAA Regional Semifinal	
1983	Bob Bertucci (5th)	31–10	3-2	2nd	.756	NCAA Regional Semifinal	
1984	Bob Bertucci (6th)	25–11	5-1	Champions	.694	NCAA Regional Semifinal	
1985	Bob Bertucci (7th)	12–24	3-3	4th	.333	—	
1986	Bob Bertucci (8th)	22–13	2-3	5th	.629	—	
1987	Sandy Lynn (1st)	18-18	4-3	3rd	.500	—	
1988	Sandy Lynn (2nd)	23–12	5-2	2nd	.657	—	
1989	Sandy Lynn (3rd)	13–15	5-3	4th	.464	—	
1990	Sandy Lynn (4th)	12–17	4-4	T–3rd	.414	—	
1991	Julie Hermann (1st)	12–17	4-10	8th	.414	—	
1992	Julie Hermann (2nd)	13–14	8-6	5th	.481	—	
1993	Julie Hermann (3rd)	18–13	7-7	5th	.581	NCAA Second Round	
1994	Julie Hermann (4th)	10–21	2-12	11th	.323	—	
1995	Julie Hermann (5th)	7-25	0-14	5th (East)	.219	—	
1996	Julie Hermann (6th)	17–16	6-8	4th (East)	.515	—	
1997	Rob Patrick (1st)	15–19	5-9	4th (East)	.441	—	
1998	Rob Patrick (2nd)	19–10	7-7	4th (East)	.655	—	
1999	Rob Patrick (3rd)	19–13	8-6	2nd (East)	.594	—	
2000	Rob Patrick (4th)	23–10	9-5	3rd (East)	.700	NCAA First Round	
2001	Rob Patrick (5th)	16–11	7-7	3rd (East)	.593	—	
2002	Rob Patrick (6th)	20–11	8-8	4th (East)	.645	—	
2003	Rob Patrick (7th)	22–9	10-6	2nd (East)	.710	—	
2004	Rob Patrick (8th)	32–3	15-1	Champions	.914	NCAA Regional Semifinal	
2005	Rob Patrick (9th)	25–9	13-3	2nd (East)	.735	NCAA Final Four	
2006	Rob Patrick (10th)	19–12	10-10	3rd (East)	.613	NCAA First Round	
2007	Rob Patrick (11th)	11–18	6-14	5th (East)	.379	—	
2008	Rob Patrick (12th)	22–10	15-5	3rd (East)	.688	NCAA First Round	
2009	Rob Patrick (13th)	24–8	16-4	T–2nd (East)	.750	NCAA Second Round	
2010	Rob Patrick (14th)	25–7	15-5	2nd (East)	.781	NCAA Second Round	
2011	Rob Patrick (15th)	28–4	19-1	Champions	.875	NCAA Second Round	
2012	Rob Patrick (16th)	22–8	15-5	2nd (East)	.733	NCAA First Round	
2013	Rob Patrick (17th)	9-23	1-17	11th	.391	—	
2014	Rob Patrick (18th)	8-24	1-17	13th	.333	—	
2015	Rob Patrick (19th)	21–12	7-11	T–8th	.636	—	
2016	Rob Patrick (20th)	17–14	7-11	T–7th	.548	—	
2017	Rob Patrick (21st)	12–15	5-13	T–11th	.444	—	
2018	Eve Rackham (1st)	26–6	16-2	2nd	.813	NCAA Second Round	
2019	Eve Rackham (2nd)	15–13	9-9	T–7th	.536	—	
2020	Eve Rackham-Watt (3rd)	12–8	12-8	5th	.600	—	
2021	Eve Rackham-Watt (4th)	20–10	11-7	4th	.667	NCAA Second Round	
2022	Eve Rackham-Watt (5th)	17-14	11-7	T–4th	.548	NCAA First Round	
2023	Eve Rackham-Watt (6th)	26-5	15-3	T–2nd	.839	NCAA Regional Semifinal	
2024	Eve Rackham-Watt (7th)	15–12	8-8	T-6th	.556	NCAA Second Round	
2025	Eve Rackham-Watt (8th)	20–8	10–5	4th	.714	NCAA First Round	
Total	8	1044–675–16	362–295	5	.607	22	

=== All-Americans ===
Tennessee has 17 All-Americans including two AVCA All-America first team selections

- Kristen Andre, 2004, 2005
- Sarah Blum, 2006
- April Chapple, 1984
- Leslie Cikra, 2011
- Nikki Fowler, 2008, 2009, 2010
- Chloe Goldman, 2009
- Leah Hinkey, 2010
- DeeDee Harrison, 2011
- Kayla Jeter, 2010
- Julie Knytych, 2004, 2005
- Amy Morris, 2004, 2005
- Ellen Mullins, 2012
- Michelle Piantadosi, 2004
- Mary Pollmiller, 2011
- Beverly Robinson, 1982
- Kelsey Robinson, 2011, 2012
- Yuliya Stoyanova, 2005, 2006

== See also ==
- List of NCAA Division I women's volleyball programs
