= Julie Hermann =

American college athletics administrator

Julie Hermann is the former athletic director at Rutgers University. Prior to her selection by Rutgers, she served as executive senior associate director of athletics for the University of Louisville.

== Early life ==
As a student-athlete, Hermann was an All-Big Eight volleyball player at the University of Nebraska–Lincoln from 1981 to 1984 when they won four conference championships, four tournament championships, appeared in four consecutive NCAA Tournaments and earned a pair of top five finishes.

== Coaching career and service ==
Hermann opened her collegiate coaching career with the Wyoming Cowgirls, where she spent two years helping them to the NCAA Tournament and a final eight finish. She also coached at the University of Tennessee. In 1997, she was the assistant coach for USA Volleyball, helping the National Team to a silver medal. She spent 16 years at the University of Louisville before being hired at Rutgers in May 2013.

Upon the announcement of her appointment as Rutgers athletic director, she received media attention for her involvement in past controversies. In 1997, Hermann was also involved in a discrimination lawsuit against the University of Tennessee in which the university's former assistant volleyball coach, Ginger Hineline, claimed Hermann discouraged her from becoming pregnant. Hineline was awarded $150,000. When confronted about controversial comments made on a wedding video, Hermann denied the existence of such a video, but soon a wedding video emerged in which Hermann joked about not wanting to have a baby in the office. Players on the University of Tennessee volleyball team also accused her of abusive coaching tactics. The players had written a letter in 1996 that resulted in Hermann's resignation.

On November 29, 2015, she was ousted from her job as athletic director for Rutgers University.

== Personal ==
Hermann has served on many community boards, including Frazier Rehab Institute, Metro Parks, Women 4 Women, YMCA, the Louisville Sports Commission, the Kentucky Sports Commission, the Commission on the Status of Women and the Center for Women and Families. She has served on the AVCA Hall of Fame selection committee and was the chair of the NCAA Division I Women's Volleyball Committee. She currently serves as president of the National Association of Collegiate Women's Administrators.

Hermann and her partner, Leslie Danehy, have one son.
