= Judy Green (volleyball coach) =

American volleyball coach

Current position
- Title: Head coach

Biographical details
- Born: Waynesville, North Carolina, USA

Coaching career (HC unless noted)
- 1986–1995: University of Montevallo
- 1996–2010: University of Alabama

Accomplishments and honors

Championships
- 2000 SEC West, 2004 SEC West

Awards
- 1993 National Coach of the Year, Southeast Region Coach of the Year (1989–1994)

Judy Green is an American volleyball coach. She is the former head coach of the volleyball team at the University of Alabama (1996–2010), and was formerly the head coach at the University of Montevallo from 1986–1995. She is a graduate of Tuscola High School in Waynesville, NC and of Western Carolina University in Cullowhee, NC where she lettered in 12 varsity sports, the only WCU athlete to ever do so.
