= 2011 NCAA Division I women's volleyball tournament =

Volleyball competition

2011 NCAA women's Division I volleyball tournament
- 2011 NCAA Division I Women's Volleyball Championship
- Champions: UCLA (4th NCAA (7th national) title)
- Runner-up: Illinois (1st title match)
- Semifinalists: Southern California (10th Final Four); Florida State (1st Final Four)
- Winning coach: Michael Sealy (1st title)
- Most outstanding player: Rachael Kidder (UCLA)
- Final Four All-Tournament Team: Alex Jupiter (USC); Zoe Nightingale (UCLA); Lauren Van Orden (UCLA); Annie Luhrsen (Illinois) Michelle Bartsch (Illinois); Colleen Ward (Illinois)

The 2011 NCAA Division I women's volleyball tournament began on December 1, 2011 and ended on December 17 at the Alamodome in San Antonio, Texas, when UCLA defeated Illinois 3 sets to 1 in the national championship match.

== Qualifying teams ==
=== Records ===
Lexington Regional
Seed	School	Conference	Berth Type	RPI	Record
	American	Patriot	Automatic	94	23-10
	Arizona	Pac-12	At-large	49	19-12
	Dayton	Atlantic-10	Automatic	36	25-6
	Delaware	Colonial	Automatic	79	20-12
	Kentucky	SEC	At-large	13	26-5
	Liberty	Big South	Automatic	145	20-12
	Lipscomb	Atlantic Sun	Automatic	89	20-10
	Long Beach State	Big West	Automatic	41	23-6
	Maryland Eastern Shore	MEAC	Automatic	195	24-6
	Michigan State	Big Ten	At-large	37	21-11
8	Penn State	Big Ten	At-large	11	23-7
	San Diego	West Coast	At-large	25	27-4
1	Texas	Big 12	Automatic	2	22-4
16	Texas A&M	Big 12	At-large	17	22-7
	Texas State	Southland	Automatic	72	27-7
9	UCLA	Pac-12	At-large	15	24-6

Gainesville Regional
Seed	School	Conference	Berth Type	RPI	Record
	Baylor	Big 12	At-large	46	18-14
	Central Michigan	MAC	Automatic	74	19-13
	Duke	Atlantic Coast	At-large	43	21-8
	Florida	SEC	At-large	20	24-5
3	Illinois	Big Ten	At-large	1	27-4
	Marquette	Big East	At-large	40	23-10
	Michigan	Big Ten	At-large	23	20-12
	Middle Tennessee	Sun Belt	At-large	45	21-11
	Missouri	Big 12	At-large	33	21-12
	Niagara	MAAC	Automatic	148	25-8
6	Northern Iowa	Missouri Valley	Automatic	5	32-1
	Ohio State	Big Ten	At-large	48	19-14
	Sacred Heart	Northeast	Automatic	80	27-7
11	Stanford	Pac-12	At-large	18	21-7
14	Tennessee	SEC	Automatic	9	27-3
	Western Kentucky	Sun Belt	Automatic	21	31-3

Minneapolis Regional
Seed	School	Conference	Berth Type	RPI	Record
	Albany	America East	Automatic	85	21-8
	Ball State	MAC	At-large	34	25-7
	Cincinnati	Big East	Automatic	19	26-9
12	Florida State	Atlantic Coast	Automatic	10	24-6
4	Iowa State	Big 12	At-large	3	22-5
	Louisville	Big East	At-large	38	23-8
	Miami (FL)	Atlantic Coast	At-large	22	25-4
	Milwaukee	Horizon	Automatic	50	25-4
13	Minnesota	Big Ten	At-large	12	18-11
	Morehead State	Ohio Valley	Automatic	86	26-7
	North Dakota State	Summit	Automatic	42	26-8
	Northern Illinois	MAC	At-large	14	28-6
5	Purdue	Big Ten	At-large	6	27-4
	Samford	Southern	Automatic	62	29-4
	Washington	Pac-12	At-large	35	23-7
	Western Michigan	MAC	At-large	32	24-8

Honolulu Regional
Seed	School	Conference	Berth Type	RPI	Record
	California	Pac-12	At-large	29	26-6
	Colorado State	Mountain West	Automatic	28	23-5
10	Hawaiʻi	WAC	Automatic	7	29-1
	Jackson State	SWAC	Automatic	217	29-9
	Kansas State	Big 12	At-large	26	20-10
	Missouri State	Missouri Valley	At-large	44	22-8
2	Nebraska	Big Ten	Automatic	4	24-4
	North Carolina	Atlantic Coast	At-large	31	23-8
	Northern Colorado	Big Sky	Automatic	108	22-8
	Oklahoma	Big 12	At-large	27	21-11
	Oregon	Pac-12	At-large	30	21-9
15	Pepperdine	West Coast	Automatic	16	22-6
	Tulsa	Conference USA	Automatic	24	27-6
7	USC	Pac-12	Automatic	8	25-4
	Wichita State	Missouri Valley	At-large	39	21-10
	Yale	Ivy	Automatic	91	18-6

== Lexington Regional ==
First round December 1–2
1	Texas	3
Texas State	0
Austin, TX
Michigan State	3
Arizona	1
Kentucky	3
Dayton	2
College Station, TX
Lipscomb	1
16	Texas A&M	3
9	UCLA	3
UMES	0
Los Angeles, CA
Long Beach State	1
San Diego	3
Delaware	3
American	1
University Park, PA
Liberty	0
8	Penn State	3

Second round December 2–3
1	Texas	3
Michigan State	0
Kentucky	3
16	Texas A&M	0
9	UCLA	3
San Diego	1
Delaware	0
8	Penn State	3

Regional semifinals December 9
1	Texas	3
Kentucky	1
9	UCLA	3
8	Penn State	0

Regional finals December 10
1	Texas	1
9	UCLA	3

== Minneapolis Regional ==
First round December 1–2
5	Purdue	3
Morehead State	0
West Lafayette, IN
Ball State	0
Louisville	3
Cincinnati	3
Samford	2
Tallahassee, FL
Albany (NY)	0
12	Florida State	3
13	Minnesota	3
North Dakota State	0
Minneapolis, MN
Western Michigan	1
Washington	3
Northern Illinois	1
Miami (FL)	3
Ames, IA
Milwaukee	0
4	Iowa State	3

Second round December 2–3
5	Purdue	3
Louisville	1
Cincinnati	2
12	Florida State	3
13	Minnesota	3
Washington	2
Miami (FL)	0
4	Iowa State	3

Regional semifinals December 9
5	Purdue	1
12	Florida State	3
13	Minnesota	1
4	Iowa State	3

Regional finals December 10
12	Florida State	3
4	Iowa State	2

== Gainesville Regional ==
First round December 1–2
3	Illinois	3
Central Michigan	0
Champaign, IL
Marquette	3
Western Kentucky	1
Ohio State	3
Middle Tennessee State	1
Knoxville, TN
Duke	1
14	Tennessee	3
11	Stanford	3
Sacred Heart	1
Stanford, CA
Baylor	1
Michigan	3
Florida	3
Missouri	1
Cedar Falls, IA
Niagara	0
6	Northern Iowa	3

Second round December 2–3
3	Illinois	3
Marquette	0
Ohio State	3
14	Tennessee	2
11	Stanford	1
Michigan	3
Florida	3
6	Northern Iowa	1

Regional semifinals December 9
3	Illinois	3
Ohio State	1
Michigan	0
Florida	3

Regional finals December 10
3	Illinois	3
Florida	1

== Honolulu Regional ==
First round December 1–2
7	Southern California	3
Yale	0
Los Angeles, CA
Tulsa	3
Oklahoma	1
Oregon	2
Colorado State	3
Honolulu, HI
Northern Colorado	0
10	Hawaiʻi	3
15	Pepperdine	3
Missouri State	0
Malibu, CA
North Carolina	3
California	2
Kansas State	3
Wichita State	0
Lincoln, NE
Jackson State	0
2	Nebraska	3

Second round December 2–3
7	Southern California	3
Tulsa	0
Colorado State	1
10	Hawaiʻi	3
15	Pepperdine	3
North Carolina	0
Kansas State	3
2	Nebraska	2

Regional semifinals December 9
7	Southern California	3
10	Hawaiʻi	2
15	Pepperdine	3
Kansas State	0

Regional finals December 10
7	Southern California	3
15	Pepperdine	2

== Final Four - Alamodome, San Antonio, Texas ==
National Semifinals; December 15
9	UCLA	3
12	Florida State	0
3	Illinois	3
7	Southern California	2

National Championship; December 17
9	UCLA	3
3	Illinois	1

== Notes ==
- December 15, 2011 – Head coach Michael Sealy of UCLA was named the National Coach of the Year by the American Volleyball Coaches Association (AVCA)
- Rachael Kidder of UCLA was the most outstanding player
- All-tournament Team: Alex Jupiter, USC; Zoe Nightingale, UCLA; Lauren Van Orden, UCLA; Annie Luhrsen, Illinois; Michelle Bartsch, Illinois; Colleen Ward, Illinois; Rachael Kidder, UCLA
