= Georgia Bulldogs women's volleyball =

College volleyball team

- Founded: 1978; 48 years ago
- University: University of Georgia
- Athletic director: Josh Brooks
- Head coach: Tom Black (10th season)
- Conference: SEC
- Location: Athens, Georgia, US
- Home arena: Stegeman Coliseum (capacity: 10,523)
- Nickname: Bulldogs
- Colors: Red and black

AIAW/NCAA regional semifinal
- 1985, 1986, 1993

AIAW/NCAA tournament appearance
- 1985, 1986, 1991, 1992, 1993, 1994, 1995, 2004, 2013, 2019, 2022, 2023

Conference tournament champion
- 1985

Conference regular season champion
- 1985, 1986

The Georgia Bulldogs women's volleyball team is who competes as part of NCAA Division I, by representing the University of Georgia in the Southeastern Conference. Georgia plays its home matches at the Stegeman Coliseum.

== History ==
=== Early years ===
Georgia's first volleyball season came in 1978 under head coach Sid Feldman. They finished their first season with a record of 17–19.

Under Feldman, the Bulldogs would show improvement each year and in 1982 started the season 25-0 and finished the season 41–12. Three seasons later in 1985 Feldman lead the team to an SEC regular season championship and SEC tournament championship, earning a bid to the 1985 NCAA Division I women's volleyball tournament, the first NCAA volleyball championship appearance in program history. Georgia beat Florida State in the first round but would lose to UCLA in the second round.

One season later in 1986, Georgia would maintain this success by winning the SEC regular season championship and make the NCAA volleyball championship for the second year in a row. They beat Texas A&M in the first round but lost to Texas in the second.

Sid Feldman was replaced as head coach by Jim Lams in 1989.

=== Sustaining success ===
Jim Lams first season in 1989 showed immediate success, going 30-4 and making the National Invitational Volleyball Championship. One season later in 1990 they would make the NIVC for the second year in a row, this time making the semifinals.

In 1991, Georgia went 28-8 and made the 1991 NCAA women's volleyball tournament, where they lost to Texas Tech in the first round.

Under coach Lams, Georgia made five straight NCAA Tournament appearances from 1991 to 1995, including making the third round in 1993 and making the second round in 1994 and 1995.

=== Middle years ===
After lack of success after the 1995 season, Jim Lams was replaced as head coach by Mary Buczek in 2000.

Under Buczek the Bulldogs would see seasons with average records, until 2004 when the team went 18-12 and made the 2004 NCAA Division I women's volleyball tournament, they would lose to Georgia Tech in the first round. Buczek would retire after the 2004 season.

After the 2004 season, Georgia would have middling success, not making any NCAA tournaments until 2013 under coach Lizzy Stemke.

=== Modern era ===
In 2017 Georgia hired Tom Black, former Loyola Marymount coach, as their next head coach. In Tom Black's first season, the team went 22-12 and made the third round of the NIVC.

Coach Black has led the Bulldogs to two NCAA tournaments since 2017, one in 2019 and one in 2022. The 2019 team lost in the first round to Cal Poly. The 2022 team made the second round, beating Towson then losing to Texas.

As of 2024 Georgia has an all-time record of 935–630.

== Yearly results ==
Year	Coach	Overall Record	Conference Record	Conference Standing	Postseason
1978	Sid Feldman	17–19			
1979	Sid Feldman	19–15			
1980	Sid Feldman	31–11			
1981	Sid Feldman	46–16			
1982	Sid Feldman	41–12			
(SEC) (1983–present)
1983	Sid Feldman	22–10	2–3		
1984	Sid Feldman	28–11	3–3		
1985	Sid Feldman	37–7	5–1		NCAA Sweet 16
1986	Sid Feldman	33–8	5–1		NCAA Sweet 16
1987	Sid Feldman	20–14	3–4		
1988	Sid Feldman	24–12	3–4		
1989	Jim Iams	30–4	7–1		
1990	Jim Iams	29–14	4–4		NIVC Semifinals
1991	Jim Iams	28–8	12–2		NCAA 1st Round
1992	Jim Iams	24–9	10–4		NCAA 1st Round
1993	Jim Iams	29–6	12–2		NCAA Sweet 16
1994	Jim Iams	26–9	12–2		NCAA 2nd Round
1995	Jim Iams	21–9	11–3		NCAA 2nd Round
1996	Jim Iams	12–18	3–11		
1997	Jim Iams	20–12	10–4		
1998	Jim Iams	14–14	8–6		
1999	Jim Iams	10–16	5–9		
2000	Mary Buczek	15–15	5–9		
2001	Mary Buczek	11–14	5–9		
2002	Mary Buczek	20–15	8–8		
2003	Mary Buczek	18–13	10–6		
2004	Mary Buczek	18–12	9–7		NCAA 1st Round
2005	Steffi Legall	10–18	5–11		
2006	Steffi Legall	6–25	2–18		
2007	Joel McCartney	17–13	8–12		
2008	Joel McCartney	17–14	10–10		
2009	Joel McCartney	17–14	8–12		
2010	Joel McCartney	11–14	2–11		
2010	Chad Hanson	4–3	4–3		
2011	Lizzy Stemke	11–19	7–13		
2012	Lizzy Stemke	14–16	8–12		
2013	Lizzy Stemke	22–10	11–7		NCAA 1st Round
2014	Lizzy Stemke	14–17	5–13		
2015	Lizzy Stemke	5–25	0–18	13th	
2016	Lizzy Stemke	13–18	1–17	13th	
2017	Tom Black	22–12	10–8	5th	
2018	Tom Black	15–14	6–12	9th	
2019	Tom Black	20–10	12–6	5th	NCAA 1st Round
2020	Tom Black	8–14	8–14	9th	
2021	Tom Black	12–17	8–10	8th	
2022	Tom Black	23–8	13–5	3rd	NCAA 2nd Round
2023	Tom Black	19–12	10–8	T-4th	NCAA 1st Round
2024	Tom Black	12–14	6–10	T-11th	-
2025	Tom Black	16–10	8–7	T-6th	-
Total		951–640	304–340		

== Coaches ==
=== Coaching history ===
Georgia women's volleyball has had eight head coaches.

No.	Coach	Tenure	Overall	Conference	Achievements
1	Sid Feldman	1978-1988	318-135 (.702)	21-16 (.568)	1985, 1986 NCAA tournament appearance
2	Jim Lams	1989-1999	243-119 (.671)	94-48 (.662)	1991, 1992, 1993, 1994, 1995 NCAA tournament appearance
3	Mary Buczek	2000-20004	82-69 (.543)	37-39 (.487)	2004 NCAA tournament appearance
4	Steffi Legal	2005-2006	16-43 (.271)	7-29 (.194)	
5	Joel McCartney	2007-2010	62-55 (.530)	28-45 (.384)	2007 NCAA Division I women's volleyball tournament appearance
6	Chad Hanson	2010	4-3 (.571)	4-3 (.571)	
7	Lizzy Stemke	2011-2016	79-105 (.429)	32-80 (.286)	2013 NCAA tournament appearance
8	Tom Black	2017–present	147-111 (.570)	81-80 (.503)	2019, 2022 NCAA tournament appearance
