= Arkansas Razorbacks women's volleyball =

Women's volleyball team of Arkansas Razorbacks

- Founded: 1994; 32 years ago
- University: University of Arkansas
- Head coach: Jason Watson (10th season)
- Conference: SEC
- Location: Fayetteville, Arkansas
- Home arena: Barnhill Arena (capacity: 9,000)
- Nickname: Razorbacks
- Colors: Cardinal and white

AIAW/NCAA Regional Final
- 2023

AIAW/NCAA regional semifinal
- 1998, 2023

AIAW/NCAA second round
- 1996, 1997 , 1998 , 1999, 2003, 2005, 2022, 2023

AIAW/NCAA tournament appearance
- 1996, 1997, 1998 , 1999, 2001, 2003, 2004, 2005, 2006, 2012, 2013, 2022, 2023

The Arkansas Razorbacks women's volleyball team represents University of Arkansas in NCAA Division I intercollegiate women's volleyball competition. Arkansas is a member of the Southeastern Conference (SEC). The Razorbacks have been led by Jason Watson since 2016.

== History ==
The program became an official varsity sport in 1994 and has been to the NCAA tournament 13 times. As of 2025, 72 players have earned All-SEC honors, 53 have earned AVCA All-Region and 15 have been named All-Americans.

Year	Head coach	Overall record	Conference record	Conference standing	Postseason
(SEC) (1994–present)
1994	Chris Poole	19–17	10–5	-	-
1995	Chris Poole	25–15	11–4	-	-
1996	Chris Poole	26–11	11–4	-	NCAA 2nd Round
1997	Chris Poole	30–6	13–2	-	NCAA 2nd Round
1998	Chris Poole	29–6	14–1	-	NCAA Regional Semifinal
1999	Chris Poole	30–7	14–1	-	NCAA 2nd Round
2000	Chris Poole	16–14	9–6	-	-
2001	Chris Poole	21–12	12–3	-	NCAA 1st Round
2002	Chris Poole	27–6	14–2	-	-
2003	Chris Poole	27–7	15–1	-	NCAA 2nd Round
2004	Chris Poole	17–16	10–6	-	NCAA 1st Round
2005	Chris Poole	21–12	11–5	-	NCAA 2nd Round
2006	Chris Poole	16–13	9–11	-	NCAA 1st Round
2007	Chris Poole	12–19	6–14	-	-
2008	Robert Pulliza	7–23	4–16	-	-
2009	Robert Pulliza	13–18	7–13	-	-
2010	Robert Pulliza	14–17	8–12	-	-
2011	Robert Pulliza	18–13	10–10	-	-
2012	Robert Pulliza	22–10	13–7	-	NCAA 1st Round
2013	Robert Pulliza	16–14	9–9	-	NCAA 1st Round
2014	Robert Pulliza	15–16	9–9	-	-
2015	Robert Pulliza	17–13	7–11	T-8th	-
2016	Jason Watson	9–21	7–11	T-7th	-
2017	Jason Watson	19–11	9–9	6th	-
2018	Jason Watson	11–17	5–13	T-10th	-
2019	Jason Watson	11–19	5–13	10th	-
2020	Jason Watson	14–8	14–8	4th	-
2021	Jason Watson	20–11	10–8	T-5th	-
2022	Jason Watson	21–9	11–7	T-4th	NCAA 2nd Round
2023	Jason Watson	28–6	15–3	T-2nd	NCAA Regional Final
2024	Jason Watson	16–12	6–10	T-11th	-
2025	Jason Watson	5–22	1–14	16th	-
Total		592–421	309–248		

== See also ==
- List of NCAA Division I women's volleyball programs
