= Alabama Crimson Tide women's volleyball =

American college volleyball team

Alabama Crimson Tide volleyball
- University: University of Alabama
- Head coach: Rashinda Reed (1st season)
- Conference: SEC
- Location: Tuscaloosa, Alabama, US
- Home arena: Foster Auditorium (capacity: 5,400)
- Nickname: Crimson Tide
- Colors: Crimson and white

AIAW/NCAA tournament appearance
- 1976, 1977, 1978, 2005, 2006, 2007, 2013, 2014

The Alabama Crimson Tide volleyball team represents the University of Alabama located in Tuscaloosa, Alabama, and competes in National Collegiate Athletic Association (NCAA) Division I, and the Southeastern Conference (SEC).

== Program record and history ==
The University of Alabama first fielded a women's volleyball team in the fall of 1974. Since then the Crimson Tide has been to the AIAW & NCAA Tournament 7 times, and won the SEC Western Division titles in 2000 & 2004. After being the head coach for 15 years Judy Green retired after the 2010 season. Alabama then hired Ed Allen to take over the program as they transitioned back into Foster Auditorium, their original home. Allen resigned in 2018, and was replaced by Lindsey Devine. Devine resigned in 2021, and Rashinda Reed was announced as the head coach in December 2021.

Year	Head Coach	Overall Record	Conference Record	Conference Standing	Postseason
1974	Stephanie Schleuder	6–13	–	–	–
1975	Stephanie Schleuder	34–12	–	–	–
1976	Stephanie Schleuder	52–6	–	–	AIAW Tournament
1977	Stephanie Schleuder	57–5	–	–	AIAW Tournament
1978	Stephanie Schleuder	33–19	–	–	AIAW Tournament
1979	Stephanie Schleuder	43–15	–	–	–
1980	Stephanie Schleuder	36–20	–	–	–
(SEC) (1981–present)
1981	Stephanie Schleuder	24–18	3–3		–
No Volleyball Program (1982–1988)
1989	Dorothy Franco-Reed	13–24	0–8	9th	–
1990	Dorothy Franco-Reed	15–22	1–7	9th	–
1991	Dorothy Franco-Reed	14–18	5–10	6th	–
1992	Dorothy Franco-Reed	10–22	4–10	7th	–
1993	Dorothy Franco-Reed	17–21	2–12	9th	–
1994	Dorothy Franco-Reed	21–14	8–8	6th	–
1995	Dorothy Franco-Reed	24–10	7–8	8th	–
1996	Judy Green	5–31	1–14	11th	–
1997	Judy Green	9–23	2–13	10th	–
1998	Judy Green	14–18	2–13	10th	–
1999	Judy Green	17–15	7–8	6th	–
2000	Judy Green	22–8	11–4	3rd	–
2001	Judy Green	22–9	10–5	5th	–
2002	Judy Green	19–15	8–8	5th	–
2003	Judy Green	18–13	11–5	3rd	–
2004	Judy Green	21–9	10–6	3rd	–
2005	Judy Green	23–11	9–7	6th	NCAA first round
2006	Judy Green	17–13	12–8	3rd	NCAA first round
2007	Judy Green	15–15	12–8	5th	NCAA first round
2008	Judy Green	16–13	9–11	8th	–
2009	Judy Green	8–22	6–14	7th	–
2010	Judy Green	11–19	3–17	10th	–
2011	Ed Allen	11–20	4–16	12th	–
2012	Ed Allen	18–14	7–13	7th	–
2013	Ed Allen	24–9	11–7	4th	NCAA first round
2014	Ed Allen	26–8	13–5	4th	NCAA second round
2015	Ed Allen	17-15	11-7	4th	–
2016	Ed Allen	20-11	9-9	4th	–
2017	Ed Allen	18-14	6-12	10th	–
2018	Ed Allen	20-12	7-11	7th	–
2018	Ed Allen	20–12	7–11	T-7th	-
2019	Lindsey Devine	12–17	4–14	11th	-
2020	Lindsey Devine	7–15	7–15	10th	-
2021	Lindsey Devine	10–20	2–16	T-12th	-
2022	Rashinda Reed	10–20	4–14	12th	-
2023	Rashinda Reed	11–18	1–17	13th	-
2024	Rashinda Reed	11–16	3–13	15th	-
2025	Rashinda Reed	14–13	5–10	12th	-
Total		865–695	237–386		

== See also ==
- List of NCAA Division I women's volleyball programs
