= Ole Miss Rebels women's volleyball =

Women's volleyball team of Ole Miss Rebels

- Founded: 1975
- University: University of Mississippi
- Head coach: Bre Henry (5th season)
- Conference: SEC
- Location: Oxford
- Home arena: Gillom Athletics Performance Center (capacity: 1,035)
- Nickname: Rebels
- Colors: Cardinal red and navy blue

AIAW/NCAA second round
- 2024

AIAW/NCAA tournament appearance
- 2006, 2007, 2010, 2021, 2024

The Ole Miss Rebels women's volleyball is the team who represents The University of Mississippi in NCAA Division I intercollegiate women's volleyball competition. Ole Miss is a founding member of the Southeastern Conference (SEC). The Rebels have been led by Bre Henry since 2023.

== Program history ==
The program became an official varsity sport in 1975 and has been to the NCAA tournament 5 times. In 2025, the team is celebrating their 50th anniversary of being a sport at Ole Miss. As of 2025, 19 players have earned All-SEC honors, 16 have earned AVCA All-Region and three have been named All-Americans.

=== Lin Dunn era (1976) ===
The first year of the competition, it was led by Lin Dunn, who was also the head coach of the women's basketball team. Dunn went on to coach 3 women's sports at Austin Peay State University. Dunn then climbed the ranks in women's basketball over a 40+ year career, coaching at Purdue, then the WNBA Indiana Fever, going to Kentucky as an assistant

On October 4, 2024, Dunn moved to a senior advisor position with the Indiana Fever.

=== Cheryl Holt era (1977) ===
In 1977, the team was coached by Cheryl Holt, who went on to coach at Austin Peay State University , retiring in 2005.

=== Jeanne Taylor era (1978–1984) ===
In 1978, Jeanne Taylor began her tenure as head coach. Her record thru 1984 was 200–113.

=== Al Givens era (1985) ===
Al Givens coached the team for a single season in 1985. His record was 29–15. After Givens left Ole Miss, he had stops at Texas A&M, before heading to Weber State University, where he coached for 34 years.

=== John Blair era (1986–2001) ===
John Blair took over the team in 1986 and stayed until 2001. His record was 210–284. Blair went on to coach at Tennessee Tech.

=== Joe Getzin era (2002–2013) ===
Joe Getzin, who had been an assistant coach at South Carolina was hired in 2002 and stayed until 2013. His record was 159–199 and took the Rebels to the NCAA Tournament 3 times. He went from there to coach Winona State.

=== Steven McRoberts era (2014–2019) ===
Steven McRoberts coached the team from 2014 until 2019. His record was 97-67. Prior to coming to Ole Miss, McRoberts had successful coaching positions a Lubbock Christian (NAIA) and Central Arkansas. After Ole Miss, he went on to coach at Missouri State.

=== Kayla Banwarth era (2020–2022) ===
In 2020, Kayla Banwarth, a former USA Volleyball player and former assistant coach at volleyball powerhouse Nebraska, began her tenure as head coach. Her record thru mid-season 2022 was 22-28.

=== Bre Henry era (2022–present) ===
Bre Henry took over the team mid-season in 2022 after serving the Rebels as a graduate assistant and assistant coach. Her record thru 2024 is 33–37. Henry played volleyball and beach volleyball at Long Beach State before serving as an trainee coach at Nebraska and an assistant at Santa Clara.

== Season-by-season results ==
Year	Head Coach	Overall Record	Conference Record	Conference Standing	Postseason
(Mississippi Association for Intercollegiate Athletics (MAIAW)) (1976–1979)
1976	Lin Dunn	22–13	-	-	-
1977	Cheryl Holt	36–19	-	-	-
1978	Jeanne Taylor	39–12	-	-	-
(SEC) (1979–present)
1979	Jeanne Taylor	35–19	10–5	-	-
1980	Jeanne Taylor	29–14	8–4	-	-
1981	Jeanne Taylor	26–27	3–6	-	-
1982	Jeanne Taylor	25–13	1–4	-	-
1983	Jeanne Taylor	28–15	2–6	-	-
1984	Jeanne Taylor	21–13	1–5	-	-
1985	Al Givens	29–15	2–4	-	-
1986	John Blair	20–15	1–5	-	-
1987	John Blair	15–20	2–5	6th	-
1988	John Blair	6–17	1–6	7th	-
1989	John Blair	30–12	4–4	5th	-
1990	John Blair	14–10	3–5	7th	-
1991	John Blair	13–18	4–10	T-7th	-
1992	John Blair	11–23	3–11	8th	-
1993	John Blair	3–28	0–14	10th	-
1994	John Blair	9–20	6–9	T-7th	-
1995	John Blair	17–17	4–11	-	-
1996	John Blair	19–11	7–8	-	-
1997	John Blair	12–18	7–8	-	-
1998	John Blair	9–23	2–13	-	-
1999	Kayla Banwarth	1–19	1–19	-	-
1999	John Blair	10–19	1–19	-	-
2000	John Blair	15–16	5–10	-	-
2001	John Blair	7–18	3–12	-	-
2002	Joe Getzin	11–17	4–12	-	-
2003	Joe Getzin	7–24	5–11	-	-
2004	Joe Getzin	10–18	2–14	-	-
2005	Joe Getzin	7–22	1–15	-	-
2006	Joe Getzin	19–13	10–10	-	NCAA 1st Round
2007	Joe Getzin	25–8	14–6	-	NCAA 1st Round
2008	Joe Getzin	14–15	10–10	-	-
2009	Joe Getzin	10–20	4–16	-	-
2010	Joe Getzin	19–11	13–7	-	NCAA 1st Round
2011	Joe Getzin	11–17	7–13	-	-
2012	Joe Getzin	12–17	6–14	-	-
2013	Joe Getzin	14–17	4–14	-	-
2014	Steven McRoberts	22–10	22–10	-	-
2015	Steven McRoberts	22–11	8–10	7th	-
2016	Steven McRoberts	17–14	6–12	T-9th	-
2017	Steven McRoberts	22–14	8–10	T-7th	NIVC Champions
2018	Steven McRoberts	14–18	4–14	12th	-
2019	Steven McRoberts	14–15	6–12	9th	-
2021	Kayla Banwarth	21–9	10–8	T-5th	NCAA 1st Round
2022	Bre Henry	11–17	7–14	T-9th	-
2023	Bre Henry	11–18	5–13	T-11th	-
2024	Bre Henry	18–12	7–9	T-8th	-
2025	Bre Henry	14–15	4–11	13th	-
Total		846–816	234–468		

== NCAA Tournament results ==
Year	Seed	Round	Opponent	Result
2006	NA	First Round	No. 5 USC	L 0-3
2007	NA	First Round	BYU	L 0-3
2010	NA	First Round	North Carolina	L 1-3
2021	NA	First Round	No. 14 Creighton	L 0-3
2024	NA	First Round; Second Round	No. 7 Florida State; No. 2 Creighton	W 3-2; L 0-3
