= Auburn Tigers women's volleyball =

Women's volleyball team of Auburn Tigers

- Founded: 1974
- University: Auburn University
- Head coach: Brent Crouch (6th season)
- Conference: SEC
- Location: Auburn
- Home arena: Neville Arena (capacity: 2,000 (for volleyball))
- Nickname: Tigers
- Colors: Burnt orange and navy blue

AIAW/NCAA second round
- 2010, 2022

AIAW/NCAA Tournament appearance
- 2010, 2022, 2023

The Auburn Tigers women's volleyball team represents Auburn University in NCAA Division I intercollegiate women's volleyball competition. Arkansas is a founding member of the Southeastern Conference (SEC). The Tigers have been led by Brent Crouch since 2020.

== History ==
The program became an official varsity sport in 1974 and has been to the NCAA tournament 3 times. As of 2025, 13 players have earned All-SEC honors, 12 have earned AVCA All-Region and 1 have been named All-Americans.

Year	Head Coach	Overall Record	Conference Record	Conference Standing	Postseason
(Association for Intercollegiate Athletics for Women (AIAW)) (1974–1986)
1974	Sandra Newkirk	35–14	-	–	-
1975	Sandra Newkirk	23–16–4	-	–	-
1976	Sandra Newkirk	20–17	-	–	-
1977	Sandra Newkirk	11–17	-	–	-
1978	Sandra Newkirk	26–20	-	–	-
1979	Sandra Newkirk	19–23	-	–	-
1980	Sandra Leigh	16–20	-	–	-
1986	Pat Ghastin	19–16	-	–	-
(SEC) (1987–present)
1987	Pat Ghastin	17–21	1–6	7th	-
1988	Pat Ghastin	24–13	2–5	6th	-
1989	Pat Ghastin	21–14	2–6	7th	-
1990	Pat Ghastin	24–13	4–4	T–3rd	-
1991	Sharon Dingman	22–13	7–7	5th	-
1992	Liz Bitzer	11–19	8–6	T–5th	-
1993	Liz Bitzer	15–15	7–7	T–5th	-
1994	Liz Bitzer	16–15	6–9	T–7th	-
1995	Liz Bitzer	16–13	7–8	T–3rd	-
1996	Liz Bitzer	22–9	11–4	T–1st	-
1997	Liz Bitzer	19–10	10–5	2nd	-
1998	Kris Grunwald	22–9	9–6	2nd	-
1999	Kris Grunwald	19–11	8–7	2nd	-
2000	Kevin Renshler	13–16	3–12	T–5th	-
2001	Kevin Renshler	1–26	0–15	6th	-
2002	Laura Farina	1–27	0–16	6th	-
2003	Laura Farina	10–18	1–15	6th	-
2004	Laura Farina	11–16	6–10	4th	-
2005	Laura Farina	8–16	2–14	5th	-
2006	Laura Farina	13–18	5–15	6th	-
2007	Laura Farina	11–20	3–17	6th	-
2008	Wade Benson	6–25	1–19	6th	-
2009	Wade Benson	16–15	8–12	2nd	-
2010	Wade Benson	21–13	11–9	3rd	NCAA 2nd Round
2011	Rick Nold	11–19	5–15	5th	-
2012	Rick Nold	17–13	8–12	3rd	-
2013	Rick Nold	19–11	10–8	T–6th	-
2014	Rick Nold	13–18	5–13	T–10th	-
2015	Rick Nold	18–12	10–8	6th	-
2016	Rick Nold	15–16	9–9	t–5th	-
2017	Rick Nold	15–12	8–10	t–7th	-
2018	Rick Nold	12–16	5–13	t–10th	-
2019	Rick Nold	7–22	1–17	13th	-
2020	Brent Crouch	0–8	0–8	13th	-
2021	Brent Crouch	13–15	5–13	11th	-
2022	Brent Crouch	22–9	10–8	6th	NCAA 2nd Round
2023	Brent Crouch	20–10	10–8	T–4th	NCAA 1st Round
2024	Brent Crouch	14–13	4–12	14th	-
2025	Brent Crouch	17–11	7–8	T-8th	-
Total		741–733–4	219–396		

== See also ==
- List of NCAA Division I women's volleyball programs
