= 2004 NCAA Division I women's volleyball tournament =

Volleyball competition

2004 NCAA women's Division I volleyball tournament
- 2004 NCAA Final Four logo
- Champions: Stanford (6th title)
- Runner-up: Minnesota (1st title match)
- Semifinalists: Washington (1st Final Four); Southern California (7th Final Four)
- Winning coach: John Dunning (4th title)
- Most outstanding player: Ogonna Nnamani (Stanford)
- Final Four All-Tournament Team: Jennifer Hucke (Stanford); Kristin Richards (Stanford); Bryn Kehoe (Stanford); Erin Martin (Minnesota); Paula Gentil (Minnesota)

The 2004 NCAA Division I women's volleyball tournament began on December 2, 2004, with 64 teams and ended December 18 when Stanford defeated Minnesota 3 games to 0 in Long Beach, California for the program's sixth NCAA title.

Stanford, who was the tournament's 11th overall seed, became the lowest seed to win the national title. Minnesota was making the school's first national championship match appearance. Stanford's sixth NCAA national championship was the most of any other program in Division I, although UCLA and Southern California had each won six overall national collegiate titles up to that point.

Ogonna Nnamani, the tournament's Most Outstanding Player, set an NCAA tournament record for kills in a tournament, as she had 165 in six matches, including 29 against Minnesota in the final. Nnamani also set the NCAA tournament record for kill attempts at 356. Stanford setter Bryn Kehoe became the first freshman setter to lead a team to an NCAA national championship.

== Records ==
Louisville Regional
Seed	School	Conference	Berth Type	Record
	Arizona	Pac-10	At-large	18-10
	Arkansas	SEC	At-large	17-15
	Cal State Northridge	Big West	At-large	17-10
	College of Charleston	Southern	Automatic	26-5
	Illinois	Big Ten	At-large	19-10
	Iona	MAAC	Automatic	19-15
	Kansas State	Big 12	At-large	19-10
	Louisville	Conference USA	Automatic	28-2
16	Missouri	Big 12	At-large	19-8
1	Nebraska	Big 12	Automatic	27-1
	Nevada	WAC	At-large	21-9
	New Mexico State	Sun Belt	Automatic	29-2
9	San Diego	West Coast	Automatic	22-4
	UC Irvine	Big West	At-large	18-10
8	USC	Pac-10	At-large	19-5
	Wichita State	Missouri Valley	Automatic	24-5

Green Bay Regional
Seed	School	Conference	Berth Type	Record
	Colorado	Big 12	At-large	14-13
	Colorado State	Mountain West	Automatic	26-3
	Florida	SEC	Auto (shared)	27-4
	Florida A&M	MEAC	Automatic	28-2
3	Hawaii	WAC	Automatic	28-0
	Jacksonville	Atlantic Sun	Automatic	15-12
	Loyola (IL)	Horizon	Automatic	21-8
	Michigan	Big Ten	At-large	19-12
	Notre Dame	Big East	Automatic	20-8
	Purdue	Big Ten	At-large	16-14
	Rice	WAC	At-large	25-4
11	Stanford	Pac-10	At-large	24-6
6	Texas	Big 12	At-large	24-4
	Texas State	Southland	Automatic	27-5
	Valparaiso	Mid-Continent	Automatic	29-4
14	Wisconsin	Big Ten	At-large	19-9

Minneapolis Regional
Seed	School	Conference	Berth Type	Record
	Alabama A&M	SWAC	Automatic	20-5
	Albany	America East	Automatic	27-6
	Dayton	Atlantic 10	Automatic	23-8
	Eastern Kentucky	Ohio Valley	Automatic	27-4
	Georgia	SEC	At-large	18-11
	Georgia Tech	ACC	At-large	25-6
	Long Island	Northeast	Automatic	32-6
4	Minnesota	Big Ten	At-large	28-4
	Ohio	MAC	Automatic	28-2
5	Ohio State	Big Ten	At-large	27-3
	Pittsburgh	Big East	At-large	21-10
12	Tennessee	SEC	Auto (shared)	30-2
	Texas A&M	Big 12	At-large	18-8
13	UC Santa Barbara	Big West	Automatic	23-3
	Winthrop	Big South	Automatic	31-3
	Yale	Ivy League	Automatic	17-7

Seattle Regional
Seed	School	Conference	Berth Type	Record
	American	Patriot	Automatic	24-6
	California	Pac-10	At-large	16-11
	Idaho	Big West	At-large	17-12
	Kansas	Big 12	At-large	18-11
	Long Beach State	Big West	At-large	23-6
	Loyola Marymount	West Coast	At-large	17-11
	Maryland	ACC	Automatic	17-14
	Pacific	Big West	At-large	19-9
2	Penn State	Big Ten	Automatic	27-2
	Sacramento State	Big Sky	Automatic	24-7
10	Saint Mary's	West Coast	At-large	23-3
	Santa Clara	West Coast	At-large	18-8
	Towson	CAA	Automatic	25-8
15	UCLA	Pac-10	At-large	18-10
	Utah	Mountain West	At-large	24-6
7	Washington	Pac-10	Automatic	24-2

== Louisville Regional ==
First round December 2–3
1	Nebraska	3
Iona	0
Lincoln, NE
Wichita St.	3
Nevada	0
Illinois	1
Louisville	3
Columbia, MO
Arkansas	1
16	Missouri	3
9	San Diego	3
New Mexico St.	0
San Diego, CA
UC Irvine	0
Arizona	3
Kansas St.	3
Cal St. Northridge	0
Los Angeles, CA
College of Charleston	0
8	Southern California	3

Second round December 3–4
1	Nebraska	3
Wichita St.	0
Louisville	3
16	Missouri	1
9	San Diego	3
Arizona	2
Kansas St.	0
8	Southern California	3

Regional semifinals December 10
1	Nebraska	3
Louisville	0
9	San Diego	1
8	Southern California	3

Regional finals December 11
1	Nebraska	2
8	Southern California	3

== Minneapolis Regional ==
First round December 2–3
5	Ohio St.	3
Dayton	0
Columbus, OH
Ohio	3
Pittsburgh	0
Texas A&M	3
Winthrop	0
Knoxville, TN
Eastern Kentucky	0
12	Tennessee	3
13	UCSB	3
Alabama A&M	0
Atlanta, GA
Georgia	0
Georgia Tech	3
Albany	1
Yale	3
New Haven, CT
Long Island	0
4	Minnesota	3

Second round December 3–4
5	Ohio St.	3
Ohio	0
Texas A&M	1
12	Tennessee	3
13	UCSB	0
Georgia Tech	3
Yale	0
4	Minnesota	3

Regional semifinals December 10
5	Ohio St.	3
12	Tennessee	2
Georgia Tech	2
4	Minnesota	3

Regional finals December 11
5	Ohio St.	2
4	Minnesota	3

== Green Bay Regional ==
First round December 2–3
3	Hawaiʻi	3
Colorado	1
Fort Collins, CO
Purdue	3
Colorado St.	2
Notre Dame	3
Valparaiso	1
Madison, WI
Loyola-Chicago	0
14	Wisconsin	3
11	Stanford	3
Jacksonville	0
Tallahassee, FL
Florida A&M	0
Florida	3
Michigan	3
Rice	1
Austin, TX
Texas St.	0
6	Texas	3

Second round December 3–4
3	Hawaiʻi	3
Purdue	0
Notre Dame	0
14	Wisconsin	3
11	Stanford	3
Florida	2
Michigan	1
6	Texas	3

Regional semifinals December 10
3	Hawaiʻi	2
14	Wisconsin	3
11	Stanford	3
6	Texas	0

Regional finals December 11
14	Wisconsin	0
11	Stanford	3

== Seattle Regional ==
First round December 2–3
7	Washington	3
Idaho	0
Seattle, WA
Kansas	3
Santa Clara	1
California	3
Pacific	2
Berkeley, CA
Sacramento State	1
10	St. Mary's	3
15	UCLA	3
Loyola Marymount	1
Los Angeles, CA
Utah	0
Long Beach State	3
Maryland	3
Towson	0
University Park, PA
American	0
2	Penn St.	3

Second round December 3–4
7	Washington	3
Kansas	2
California	2
10	St. Mary's	3
15	UCLA	3
Long Beach St.	0
Maryland	0
2	Penn St.	3

Regional semifinals December 10
7	Washington	3
10	St. Mary's	0
15	UCLA	3
2	Penn St.	1

Regional finals December 11
7	Washington	3
15	UCLA	2

== Final Four – Long Beach Arena, Long Beach, California ==
National Semifinals; December 16
8	Southern California	1
4	Minnesota	3
11	Stanford	3
7	Washington	1

National Championship; December 18
4	Minnesota	0
11	Stanford	3

== National Semifinals ==
=== Southern California vs. Minnesota ===
Teams	Game 1	Game 2	Game 3	Game 4
MIN	30	29	30	30
USC	25	31	26	20

Behind 18 kills from Minnesota's Erin Martin, the Golden Gophers knocked out two-time defending NCAA Champion USC with a 3–1 decision to advance to their first NCAA Championship match in school history.

=== Stanford vs. Washington ===
Teams	Game 1	Game 2	Game 3	Game 4
STAN	30	23	30	30
WASH	25	30	27	24

Stanford, the surprise of the tournament, came through with a 3–1 win over Pac-10 champion Washington. Ogonna Nnamani had 33 kills to lead Stanford to the championship match. During the regular season, Stanford and Washington split the match ups, with Washington sweeping the Cardinal in Seattle and Stanford returning the favor in Palo Alto by defeating the Huskies in five.

== National Championship: Stanford vs. Minnesota ==
Teams	Game 1	Game 2	Game 3
STAN	30	30	30
MIN	23	27	21

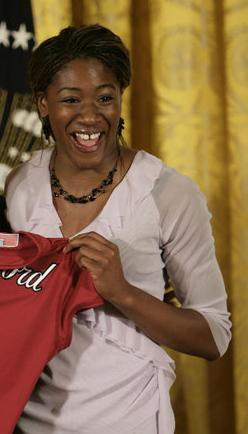
NCAA Tournament MVP Ogonna Nnamani set an NCAA Tournament record for kills in an NCAA Tournament. Nnamani had 165 kills through six tournament matches.

Behind 29 kills from Nnamani, Stanford completed their NCAA run by sweeping the Golden Gophers. Stanford easily won the first set, 30–23. The second was much closer, with Stanford going on a late run to win the second set, 30–27.

The third set was not competitive, which may have been due to an injury. Early in the third set, Minnesota's All-American libero, Paula Gentil, collided with a teammate while trying to dig a ball which left her unable to move on the court for over five minutes. Gentil was able to get up, but could not return to the match with a neck injury. Stanford won easily, 30–21.

Stanford's surprising run was due to the fact that they started out the season 15–6 and were ranked outside of the top ten in the beginning of the season. However, the Cardinal found momentum in the middle of the season, winning their last 15 matches including an upset of then-#1 and undefeated Washington in five sets.

== NCAA Tournament records ==
There are four NCAA tournament records that were set in the 2004 tournament.

- Kills, tournament (individual record) - Ogonna Nnamani, Stanford University - 165 total kills (18 vs. Jacksonville, 30 vs. Florida, 28 vs. Texas, 27 vs. Wisconsin, 33 vs. Washington, 29 vs. Minnesota).
- Total attempts, tournament (individual record) - Ogonna Nnamani, Stanford University - 356 total attempts (36 vs. Jacksonville, 89 vs. Florida, 56 vs. Texas, 49 vs. Wisconsin, 78 vs. Washington, 48 vs. Minnesota).
- Solo blocks, tournament (individual record) - Ogonna Nnamani, Stanford University - 15 solo blocks (2 vs. Jacksonville, 3 vs. Florida, 2 vs. Texas, 2 vs. Wisconsin, 5 vs. Washington, 1 vs. Minnesota).
- Total digs, tournament (individual record) - Paula Gentil, University of Minnesota - 173 total digs (25 vs. Long Island, 21 vs. Yale, 38 vs. Ohio State, 41 vs. Georgia Tech, 33 vs. Southern California, 15 vs. Stanford).
