= NCAA Women's Volleyball Championship =

Collegiate volleyball tournaments

The NCAA Women's Volleyball Championship refers to one of three championships in women's indoor volleyball contested by the NCAA since 1981:

- NCAA Division I Women's Volleyball Championship
- NCAA Division II Women's Volleyball Championship
- NCAA Division III Women's Volleyball Championship

From 1970 through 1980, before the NCAA governed women's collegiate athletics, the Association for Intercollegiate Athletics for Women alone conducted the women's collegiate volleyball championships.

Volleyball was one of twelve women's sports added to the NCAA championship program for the 1981-82 school year, as the NCAA engaged in battle with the AIAW for sole governance of women's collegiate sports. The AIAW continued to conduct its established championship program in the same twelve (and other) sports; however, after a year of dual women's championships, the NCAA prevailed over the AIAW acquired its membership.

In the NCAA Women's Volleyball Championship, separate tournaments are conducted for Division I, Division II, and Division III institutions. This differs from NCAA men's volleyball because there are far more NCAA member schools offering women's volleyball. Until the 2011–12 school year (2012 men's season—NCAA women's volleyball is a fall sport, while men's volleyball is a spring sport), there was no official divisional structure in men's collegiate volleyball, and all men's teams, regardless of their divisional affiliation, were eligible to compete for the same NCAA championship. Since 2011-12, the NCAA has truncated the championships, with the National Collegiate Championship (previously, the only men's tournament) open to schools in Divisions I and II, and the Division III Championship for Division III schools.

In the sport of beach volleyball, the NCAA conducts a women-only, all-divisions championship. The inaugural championship was held in spring 2016.

== See also ==
- AIAW Intercollegiate Women's Volleyball Champions
- NCAA men's volleyball tournament (National Collegiate division)
- NCAA Division III men's volleyball tournament
- NCAA Beach Volleyball Championship (women only, beginning in 2016)
- American Volleyball Coaches Association (AVCA)
