= Tonya Johnson =

American volleyball player and coach

Current position
- Title: Head coach
- Team: LSU
- Conference: SEC
- Record: 67–70 (.489)
- Annual salary: $250,000.00

Biographical details
- Born: September 1, 1969 (age 57); Zachary, Louisiana
- Education: Louisiana State University

Playing career
- 1987–1990: LSU

Coaching career (HC unless noted)
- 1995–1997: Kentucky (Assistant)
- 1998–2003: LSU (Assistant)
- 2003–2008: Texas (Assistant)
- 2009–2013: Georgia Tech
- 2014–2021: Texas (Associate HC)
- 2022–: LSU

Head coaching record
- Overall: 144–129 (.527)

Tonya Doral Johnson (born September 1, 1969) is an American volleyball coach and former player. She has been the head coach of the LSU women's volleyball team since 2022.

== Personal life ==
Johnson was born on September 1, 1969, in Zachary, Louisiana. She played both volleyball and basketball at Zachary High School before ultimately focusing on volleyball.

== Playing career ==
Johnson played volleyball at LSU from 1987 to 1990, helping the Tigers to Southeastern Conference titles in 1989 and 1990. She also helped LSU advance to its first-ever Final Four appearance in the 1990 NCAA tournament as well as a Sweet 16 appearance in 1989.

== Coaching career ==
Johnson's first collegiate coaching role came in 1995 when she coached as an assistant at Kentucky, under then-head coach Fran Flory. In 1998, along with Flory, she returned to her alma mater when she went LSU as an assistant coach. She remained at LSU until 2003, when she moved to Texas as an assistant head coach under Jerritt Elliott.

Johnson's first collegiate head coach role began in 2009 with the Georgia Tech Yellow Jackets. At Georgia Tech, she compiled an overall record of 85–72, with an NCAA tournament appearance in 2009. While at Georgia Tech, she was the co-head coach of USA volleyball's A2 team that won a silver medal in 2012.

After leaving Georgia Tech, she returned to Texas as the associate head coach and main recruiting coordinator in 2014 under Elliott, where she would remain until the conclusion of the 2021. In her years at Texas, the team advanced to multiple NCAA final fours and won multiple Big 12 championships. Johnson is also known to be an excellent recruiter, as Johnson helped Elliott land the nation's second-ranked recruiting classes in three consecutive seasons (2006–08). Texas' 2009 recruiting class was also strong, with the signing of the top- and fifth-ranked prep players in Bailey Webster and Sha’Dare McNeal.

Johnson returned to LSU as head coach in 2022 after Flory announced her retirement. She stated that she was offered the job before she left campus after her interview. In her first season at LSU, she led the program to its first winning season since 2019 and qualified for the NCAA tournament for the first time since 2017, advancing to the second round after defeating HawaiʻI, before losing to Stanford in the second round.

== Head coaching record ==
Record table
Season	Team	Overall	Conference	Standing	Postseason
Georgia Tech (ACC) (2009–2013)
2009	Georgia Tech	21–10	15–5	3rd	NCAA first round
2010	Georgia Tech	18–14	11–9	T–5th	
2011	Georgia Tech	15–16	8–12	T–7th	
2012	Georgia Tech	19–12	10–10	6th	
2013	Georgia Tech	12–20	6–14	12th	
Georgia Tech:		85–72 (.541)	50–50 (.500)		
LSU (SEC) (2022–present)
2022	LSU	16–14	9–9	7th	NCAA second round
2023	LSU	11–17	6–12	T–9th	
2024	LSU	15–12	7–9	T–8th	
2025	LSU	13–14	6–9	T–10th	
2026	LSU	13–13	6–9	10th	
LSU:		67–70 (.489)	34–48 (.415)		
Total:		152–138 (.524)			
