= Pete Maravich Assembly Center =

Indoor arena in Louisiana, United States

- "The PMAC" "The Deaf Dome"
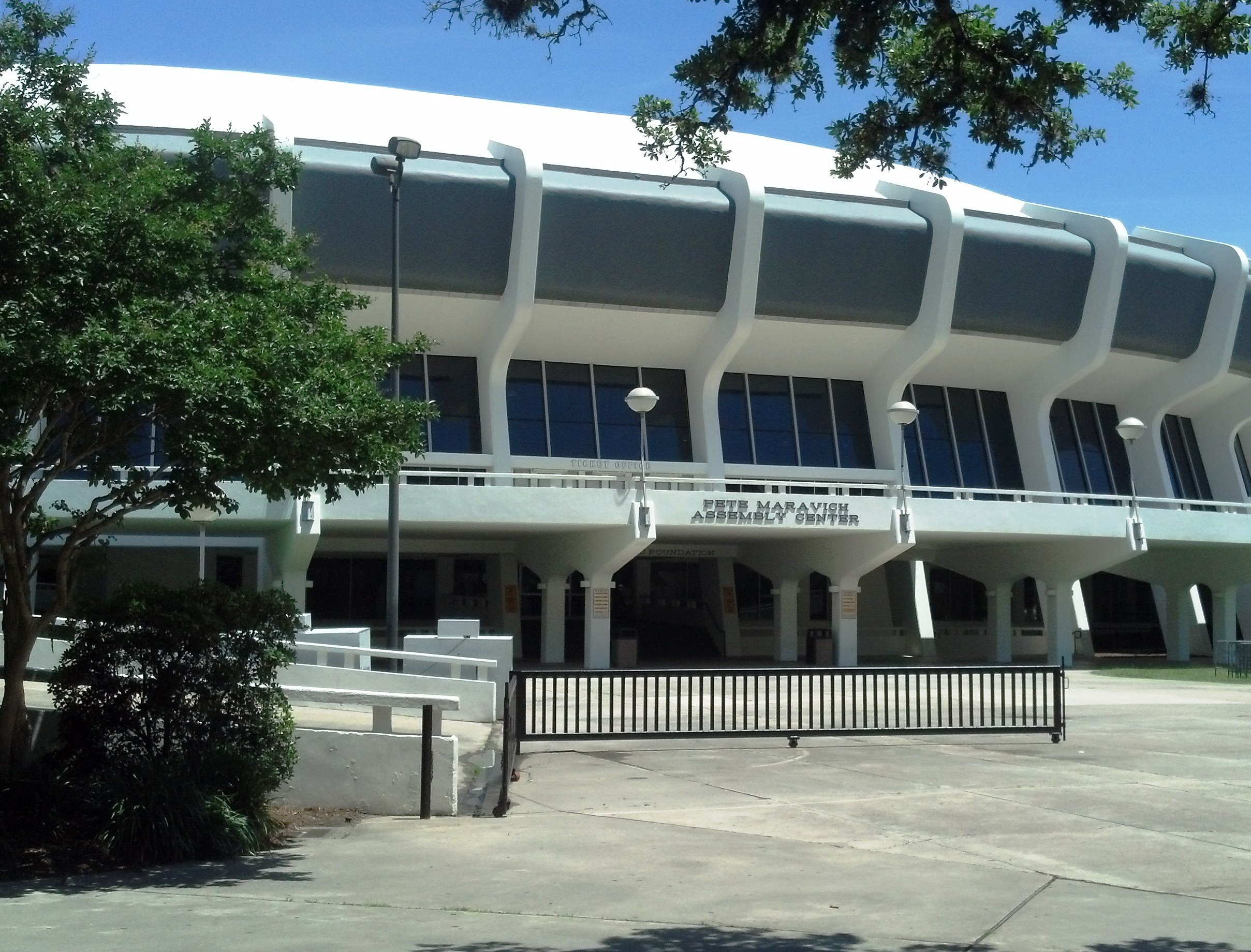
- Interactive map of Pete Maravich Assembly Center
- Former names: LSU Assembly Center (1972–1988)
- Address: North Stadium Road
- Location: Baton Rouge, Louisiana
- Coordinates: 30.4142°N 91.1845°W
- Owner: Louisiana State University
- Operator: LSU Athletics Department
- Capacity: 13,215 (2009–present); 13,472 (2006–2009); 14,164 (1990–2005); 14,236 (1983–1990); 14,262 (1981–1983); 14,327 (1975–1981); 14,351 (1972–1975); 14,192 (center-stage events); 8,945-13,312 (end-stage concerts); 8,628 (amphitheater); 4,619 (theater)
- Surface: Hardwood

Construction
- Groundbreaking: 1969
- Opened: January 3, 1972
- Cost: $11.5 million ($88.5 million in 2025 dollars)
- Architects: Robert M. Coleman & Partners

Tenants
- LSU Tigers and Lady Tigers (NCAA) (1972–present); Men's and Women's Basketball (1972–present); Wrestling (1972–1985); Volleyball (1974–present); Gymnastics (1975–present); Louisiana Bayou Beast (PIFL) (1998)

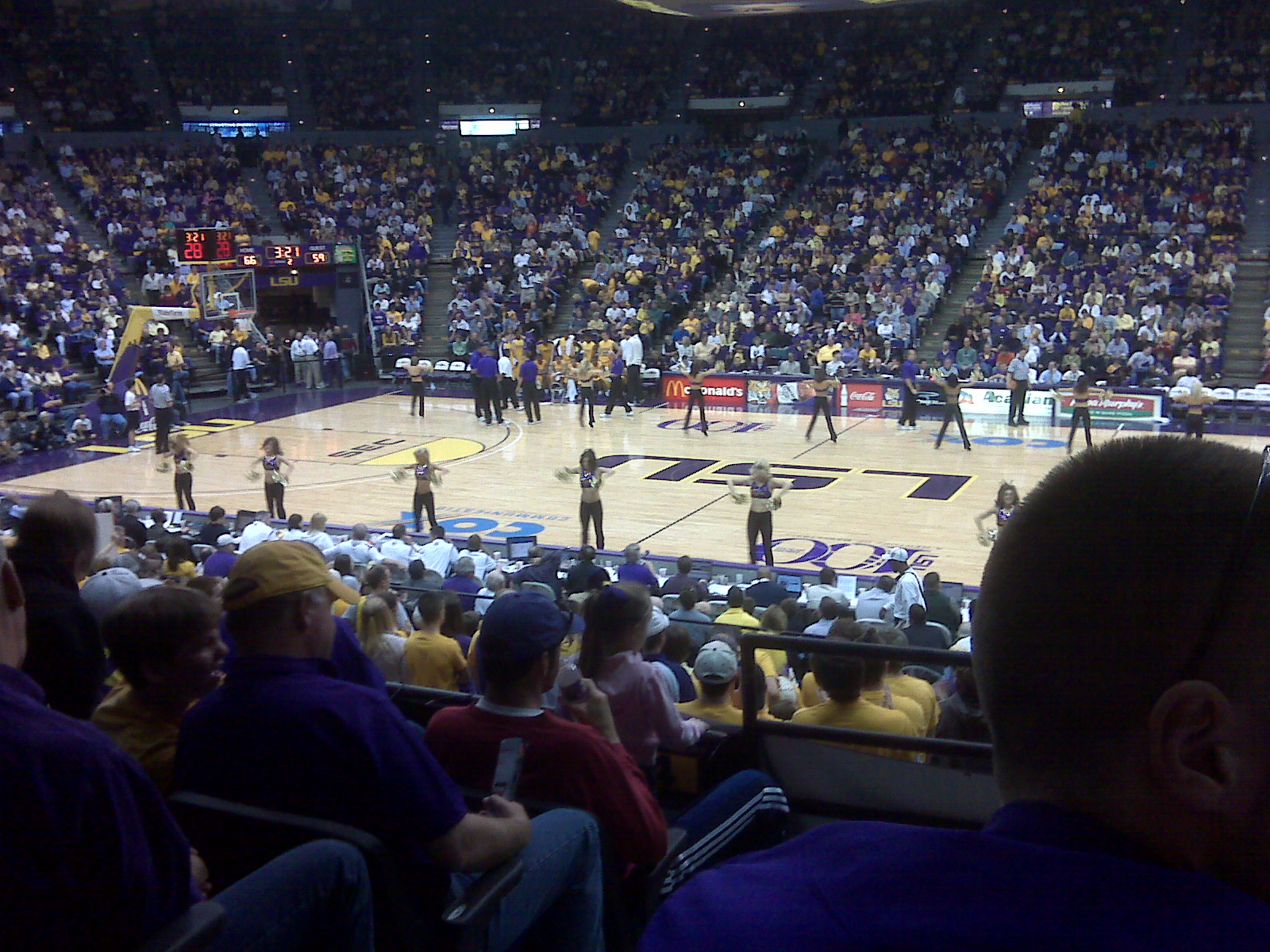
Dale Brown/Sue Gunter Court, Pete Maravich Assembly Center

The Pete Maravich Assembly Center is a 13,215-seat multi-purpose arena in Baton Rouge, Louisiana. The arena opened in 1972. It was originally known as the LSU Assembly Center, but was renamed in honor of Pete Maravich, a Tiger basketball legend, shortly after his death in 1988. Louisiana governor Buddy Roemer signed an act to rename the building in Maravich's honor (under Louisiana law, no LSU or state owned building may be named after a living person). Maravich never played in the arena as a collegian but played in it as a member of the Atlanta Hawks in a preseason game. But his exploits while at LSU led the university to build a larger home for the basketball team, which languished for decades in the shadow of the school's football program. The Maravich Center is known to locals as "The PMAC" or "Pete's Palace", or by its more nationally known nickname, "The Deaf Dome", coined by Dale Brown. The Maravich Center's neighbor, Tiger Stadium is known as "Death Valley".

The slightly oval building is located directly to the north of Tiger Stadium, and its bright-white roof can be seen in many telecasts of that stadium. The arena concourse is divided into four quadrants: Pete Maravich Pass, The Walk of Champions, Heroes Hall and Midway of Memories. The quadrants highlight former LSU Tiger athletes, individual and team awards and memorabilia pertaining to the history of LSU basketball, gymnastics and volleyball. There are 11,230 permanent seats in the arena: 6,931 upper-level seats, 4,299 lower-level seats and 2,000 seats on retractable risers.

The "L" Club meeting room and Tiger Athletic Foundation offices are also located in the arena.

Prior to building the Assembly Center, LSU played its games at John M. Parker Agricultural Coliseum (aka, the "Cow Palace"), located on the southeast corner of the campus.

== LSU Basketball Practice Facility ==
The LSU Basketball Practice Facility is the practice facility for the LSU Tigers men's basketball and LSU Tigers women's basketball teams. The facility is connected to the Pete Maravich Assembly Center through the Northwest portal. The facility features separate, full-size duplicate gymnasiums for the women's and men's basketball teams. They include a regulation NCAA court in length with two regulation high school courts in the opposition direction. The courts are exact replicas of the Maravich Center game court and have two portable goals and four retractable goals. The gymnasiums are equipped with a scoreboard, video filming balcony and scorer's table with video and data connection. The facility also houses team locker rooms, a team lounge, training rooms, a coach's locker room and coach's offices.

The building also includes a two-story lobby and staircase that ascends to the second level where a club room is used for pre-game and post-game events and is connected to the Pete Maravich Assembly Center concourse. The lobby includes team displays and graphics, trophy cases and memorabilia of LSU basketball including a statue of Lady Tiger Coach Sue Gunter. A 900-pound (410 kg) Bronze statue of LSU legends Shaquille O'Neal, Pete Maravich, Bob Pettit, and Seimone Augustus are located in front of the facility.

== Pete Maravich Assembly Center team facilities ==
=== Men's and women's basketball facilities ===
The men's and women's basketball teams both have dedicated locker rooms in the Pete Maravich Assembly Center.

The men's basketball locker room in the southwest quadrant was fully renovated in 2005–2006.

The women's basketball locker room in the northwest quadrant was formerly known as the Jinks Coleman Women’s Basketball Locker Room was named in honor of Jinks Coleman, the first women's basketball coach at LSU following her death in 2000. In 2023, following a $1.5 million donation from Jerry and Roselyn Juneau, the locker room was renovated along with upgrading the attached players and coaches' lounges and film room. The locker room was renamed the Juneau Locker Room following the renovation.

=== Women's volleyball facilities ===
The LSU Tigers Volleyball Practice Facility is located in the arena. It includes a state-of-the-art locker room facility, film room, equipment room and training rooms off the arenas southwest corridor. The auxiliary gym located underneath the north section of the arena is a volleyball-only practice facility.

== NCAA tournament ==
The Maravich Assembly Center has been a host site for both the men's and women's NCAA basketball tournament.

It played host to the NCAA men's basketball tournament three times, in 1976, 1977 and 1986. In 1976, Indiana University defeated Alabama and Marquette in the Mideast Regional en route to an undefeated season and the national championship, and in 1986, LSU defeated Purdue and Memphis State (now Memphis) to begin an unlikely run to the Final Four as a #11 seed, the first of only four 11 seeds to reach the national semifinals (the others being George Mason in 2006, VCU in 2011 and Loyola-Chicago in 2018).

The arena has played host to the NCAA Women's Basketball First and Second Rounds in 1997, 2000, 2004, 2008, 2009, 2012, 2013, 2014, 2022, 2023, 2024 and 2025. The Tigers launched their run to the 2023 national championship by defeating Hawaii and Michigan at the PMAC.

== National Invitation Tournament (NIT) ==
The Maravich Assembly Center has played host to NIT men's tournament games in 1982, 1983, 2002, 2018 and 2024.

== SEC Tournaments ==
The Maravich Center played host to the 1981 SEC women's basketball tournament, the 1988 SEC men's basketball tournament and two SEC Volleyball Tournaments.

== Events ==
In addition to sporting events, the arena hosts concerts, stand-up comedy shows, graduations, convocations, lectures and other special events. A stage can be lowered into place at the north end allowing 4,000 additional seats for theatrical productions. An additional 1,000 seats can be placed on the floor.

The arena has hosted concerts by Alice Cooper, Arlo Guthrie, Bad Company, Barry Manilow, Berlin, Billy Currington, Billy Joel, Bob Dylan, Bon Jovi, Boston, Boz Scaggs, Bruce Springsteen, Bush, Cat Stevens, Charley Pride, Chicago, Commodores, Crosby, Stills & Nash, Culture Club, David Bowie, Def Leppard, Diana Ross, Doug Kershaw, Eagles, Earth, Wind & Fire, Electric Light Orchestra, Elton John, Emerson Lake and Palmer, Elvis Presley, Fleetwood Mac, Foghat, Garth Brooks, George Harrison, George Strait, Grateful Dead, Guns N' Roses, Harry Chapin, Heart, Jackson Browne, Jimmy Buffett, Joan Baez, John Denver, John Mellencamp, Joni Mitchell, Journey, KC and the Sunshine Band, Kenny Rogers, Kiss, Led Zeppelin, Liberace, Linda Ronstadt, Lionel Richie, Little Big Town, Marvin Gaye, Metallica, Neil Diamond, Neil Young, Olivia Newton-John, Oak Ridge Boys, Pat Benatar, Peter Frampton, Pink Floyd, R.E.M., REO Speedwagon, Statler Brothers, Rod Stewart, Skid Row, Sonny and Cher, Sting, Styx, The Doobie Brothers, The Go-Go's, The Jackson 5, The Moody Blues, The O'Jays, The Rolling Stones, The Who, The Wreckers, Tina Turner, U2, Van Halen, Willie Nelson, Yes and ZZ Top.

In October 1977, the rock band Lynyrd Skynyrd was involved in a plane crash on their way to play at the arena from their last show ever in Greenville, SC. Several band members including lead singer Ronnie Van Zant, died in the crash. The concert was scheduled during LSU's homecoming the night before the Tigers' football game vs. the Oregon Ducks.

The arena has also hosted comedy shows by Bob Hope, Eddie Murphy, and George Carlin.

== Non-LSU tenants ==
After the NBA's New Orleans Hornets (now New Orleans Pelicans) were displaced by Hurricane Katrina in 2005, the arena was under consideration as a possible temporary home for the team. The Hornets played just one of six scheduled home games at the PMAC during the 2005–06 season. The other five were relocated to Oklahoma City or Norman.

In 1998, the arena played host to the Louisiana Bayou Beast of the Professional Indoor Football League. The Beast played 2 preseason games, 8 regular season games, and the PIFL Championship Game on August 15, 1998, in the Maravich Center.

The arena hosted the Louisiana High School Athletic Association boys basketball state semifinals and championship games from 1983 through 1996. It also hosted the Louisiana high school wrestling state tournament, which was not sanctioned at the time by the LHSAA, in 1972, '73 and '74.

== Hurricane Katrina ==
In the aftermath of Hurricane Katrina, the arena was quickly turned into the largest triage center and acute care field hospital ever created in United States history. The 800-bed facility, which was under the direction of the Federal Emergency Management Agency (FEMA) was staffed by ordinary citizen volunteers up to and including physicians. Some of the volunteers were themselves displaced from New Orleans due to the hurricane. Helicopters with injured evacuees landed on the infield of LSU's Bernie Moore Track Stadium, which is adjacent to the arena, while ambulances from around the region lined up with other patients that needed treatment. Those deemed healthy enough were either transferred to out-of-state facilities or to LSU's Carl Maddox Field House which had been transformed into a large emergency shelter.

== See also ==
- LSU Tigers basketball
- LSU Lady Tigers basketball
- LSU Tigers gymnastics
- LSU Tigers women's volleyball
- List of NCAA Division I basketball arenas
- List of indoor arenas in the United States
- List of music venues
