= Madison Lilley =

American volleyball player and coach (born 1999)

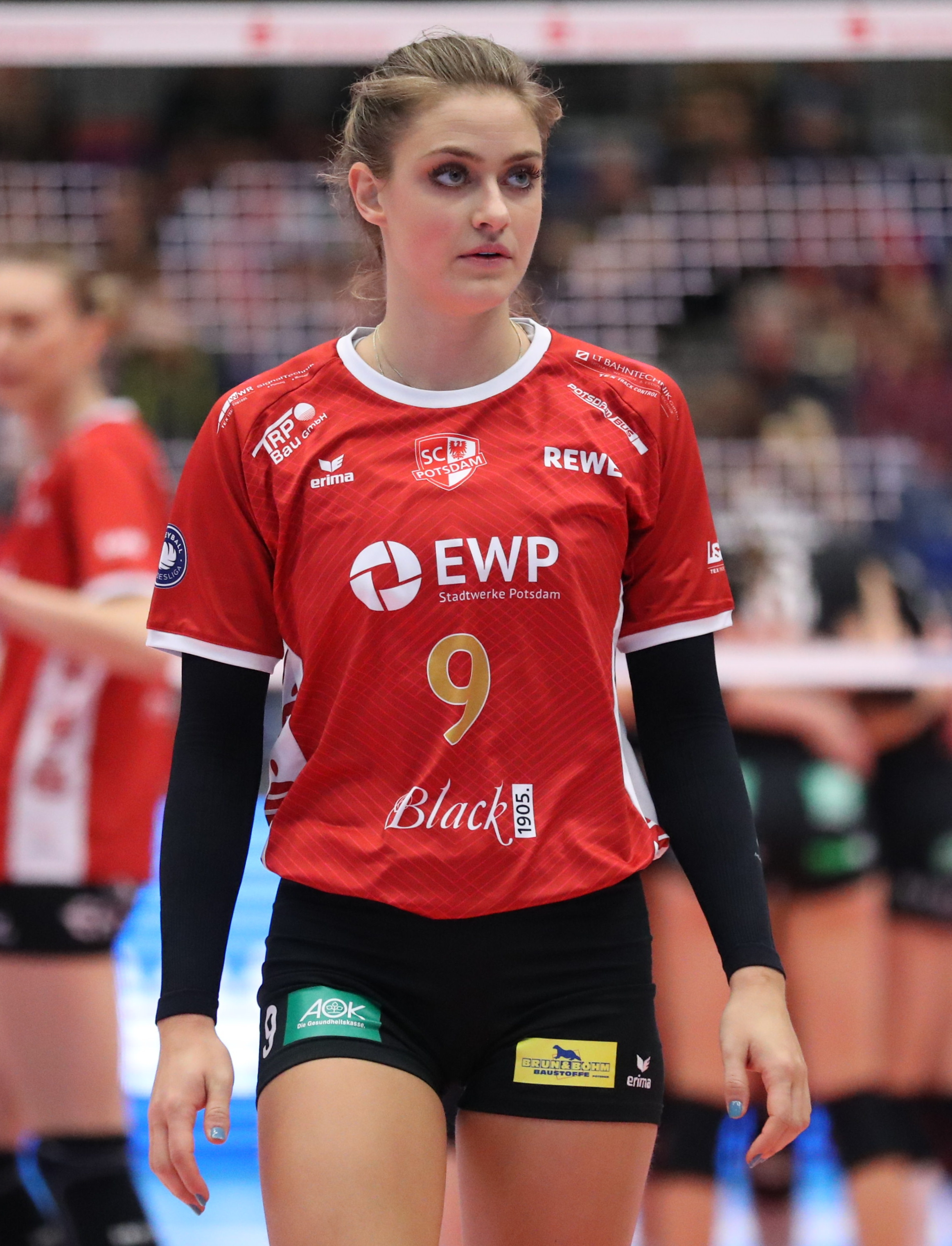

Personal information
- Full name: Madison Paige Lilley
- Nationality: United States
- Born: April 15, 1999 (age 27)
- Hometown: Overland Park, Kansas, U.S.
- Height: 180 cm (5 ft 11 in)
- Weight: 75 kg (165 lb)
- Education: Kentucky

Volleyball information
- Position: Assistant coach
- Current club: Kentucky

Career
Years	Teams
2021–2022	(Germany) SC Potsdam
2022–2023	(France) Béziers Volley

National team
2019	United States
Medal record
Indoor Volleyball
Pan-American Cup
Representing the United States
Gold medal – first place	2019 Trujillo/Chiclayo

Madison Paige Lilley (born April 15, 1999) is an American former professional volleyball player and current collegiate coach. She is an assistant coach for her alma mater, Kentucky.

== Early life ==
Lilley is from Overland Park, Kansas. She played volleyball for Blue Valley West High School. In her graduating class, she was the #4 ranked national recruit and won the Andi Collins award for best high school setter in the nation. Additionally, she was a two-time Kansas 6A state champion, was the Kansas Gatorade Player of the Year, National Junior Player of the Year, and was a four-time member of the USA Volleyball All-Tournament Team.

Lilley committed to play for the University of Kentucky as a freshman in high school, attributing her early interest from attending Kentucky volleyball camps since middle school.

== Career ==
=== College ===
Lilley is considered to be the most accomplished volleyball player in Kentucky history. She was a four time All-American, led Kentucky to 4 straight SEC titles, as well as the school's first ever NCAA championship in women's volleyball during her senior season. The win was also the SEC's first NCAA title in women's volleyball. Lilley had 53 assists in the championship match and notched a career high 19 digs. Lilley was named the 2020 NCAA Division I Player of the Year and the NCAA championship most outstanding player. In July 2021, she was named SEC Conference Female Athlete of the Year, the first volleyball player in SEC history to earn the award.

=== Professional clubs ===
- (Germany) SC Potsdam (2021–2022)
- (France) Béziers Volley

=== USA National Team ===
While still in college, Lilley made her U.S. national team debut at the 2019 Women's Pan-American Volleyball Cup, earning a gold medal with the team.

== Awards and honors ==
=== Clubs ===
- 2021–2022 German Bundesliga – Silver medal, with SC Potsdam.
- 2021–2022 German Cup – Bronze medal, with SC Potsdam.

=== International ===
- 2019 Pan-American Cup, Gold Medal with the U.S. National Team.

=== College ===
- 2020 NCAA Division I women's volleyball tournament,, NCAA Champions
- AVCA National Player of the Year (2020)
- NCAA Tournament Most Outstanding Player (2020)
- SEC Player of the Year (2020)
- SEC Female Athlete of the Year (2021)
- AVCA First Team All-American (2020)
- Honda Sports Award winner in volleyball (2020)
- AVCA Second Team All-American (2017, 2018, 2019)
- All-SEC First Team (2018, 2019, 2020)
- Volleyball Magazine Second Team All-American (2019)
- 2021 ESPY Awards Best Female NCAA Athlete Finalist.
- SEC Freshman of the Year (2017)

== Personal life ==
Lilley is engaged to former Kentucky basketball player and current Fenerbahce player Nate Sestina.
