= Russell Brock (volleyball) =

American volleyball coach

Current position
- Title: Head coach
- Team: LSU
- Conference: SEC

Biographical details
- Born: Baytown, Texas
- Education: University of Southern California

Playing career
- 1993–1996: USC

Coaching career (HC unless noted)
- 1996–2005: Baytown Christian Academy
- 2006–2008: Rice (indoor) (volunteer asst.)
- 2009–2013: Rice (indoor) (asst.)
- 2014–2016: LSU (beach) (Assoc. HC)
- 2017–present: LSU (beach)

Russell Brock is the head coach of the LSU Tigers women's beach volleyball team.

== Coaching career ==
Brock began his college coaching career as a volunteer assistant coach for the Rice Owls women's indoor volleyball team in 2006. Starting in 2009, Brock became a full-time assistant coach for the Rice women's indoor volleyball team.

In 2014, Brock became associate head coach for the LSU Tigers women's beach volleyball team under head coach Fran Flory. After the 2016 season, Flory resigned as beach volleyball coach to continue to focus on her duties as LSU Tigers women's volleyball head coach. Brock was then promoted from associate head coach to head coach of the LSU women's beach volleyball team beginning with the 2017 season.

Russell made the NCAA Beach Volleyball Championship tournament in each his first three seasons as LSU beach head coach from 2017 to 2019.

== Playing career ==
A 1996 graduate of the University of Southern California, Brock was a 4-year letterman for the USC Trojans men's volleyball team. Brock held the program’s all-time record for digs tallying 956, a record he held for 10 years. He also set an NCAA record with 45 matches of 10-plus digs.

== Collegiate Head Coaching Record ==
=== Beach ===
Record table
Season	Team	Overall	Conference	Standing	Postseason
LSU (Coastal Collegiate Sports Association) (2017–present)
2017	LSU	27–8			NCAA Championship Tournament
2018	LSU	26–12			NCAA Championship Tournament
2019	LSU	31–8			NCAA Championship Tournament
LSU:		124–56			
Total:		124–56			
National champion Postseason invitational champion Conference regular season champion Conference regular season and conference tournament champion Division regular season champion Division regular season and conference tournament champion Conference tournament champion
