= Gerry Owens (volleyball) =

Former american women volleyball head coach

Coaching career (HC unless noted)
- 1977–1980: LSU

Head coaching record
- Overall: 95–49

Gerry Owens is the former women's volleyball head coach at Louisiana State University. She had an overall record of 95–49.

In 1977, Owens was named head coach of the LSU Tigers women's volleyball team replacing Jinks Coleman. She served in that role from 1977 until 1980. In 1977, the team had a record of 41–9. The 1978 team had a record of 28–2. In 1979, the volleyball team experienced its first losing season under Owens and had a record of 15–17. In Owens final season in 1980, the team had a record of 11–21. Ruth Nelson was hired to replace Owens for the 1981 season.
