= Kentucky Wildcats women's volleyball =

Women's volleyball team of the University of Kentucky

- Founded: 1977
- University: University of Kentucky
- Head coach: Craig Skinner (22nd season)
- Conference: SEC
- Location: Lexington, Kentucky, US
- Home arena: Memorial Coliseum (capacity: 6,250)
- Nickname: Kentucky Wildcats
- Colors: Blue and white

AIAW/NCAA tournament champion
- 2020*

AIAW/NCAA tournament runner-up
- 2025

AIAW/NCAA tournament semifinal
- 2020*, 2025

AIAW/NCAA Regional Final
- 1983, 1987, 2017, 2020*, 2024, 2025

AIAW/NCAA regional semifinal
- 1983, 1987, 1988, 1990, 2009, 2011, 2012, 2017, 2018, 2019, 2020*, 2022, 2023, 2024, 2025

AIAW/NCAA tournament appearance
- 1983, 1987, 1988, 1990, 1992, 1993, 2005, 2006, 2007, 2008, 2009, 2010, 2011, 2012, 2013, 2014, 2015, 2016, 2017, 2018, 2019, 2020*, 2021, 2022, 2023, 2024, 2025

Conference tournament champion
- SEC; 1979, 1980, 1983, 1987, 1988, 2025

Conference regular season champion
- SEC; 1979, 1980, 1983, 1987, 1988, 2017, 2018, 2019, 2020, 2021, 2022, 2023, 2024, 2025 * Tournament played in spring 2021; season officially labeled "2020–21" by the NCAA

The Kentucky Wildcats women's volleyball is the team that represents the University of Kentucky in NCAA Division I intercollegiate women's volleyball competition. Kentucky is a founding member of the Southeastern Conference (SEC). The Wildcats have been led by Craig Skinner since 2005.

The program became an official varsity sport in 1977 and has won the SEC regular season 14 times and won the NCAA championship in 2020.

== Program record and history ==
The University of Kentucky first fielded a women's volleyball team in the fall of 1977. Since then the Wildcats have been to the NCAA Tournament 26 times, and won the SEC regular season 14 times.

=== Delphine Nemeth era (1977–1981) ===
The program was started in 1977 under coach Delphine Nemeth who was also a nurse anesthesiologist at the University of Kentucky hospital. The team competed in the Kentucky Women's Intercollegiate Conference (KWIC) as part of the AIWA and the Southeastern Conference (SEC) during this time. During this time, the SEC had the first women's volleyball conference championship, which was won by Kentucky over Tennessee in 1979. She was named KWIC Coach of the Year in 1979. Her record as coach was 126–74–1.

=== Mary Jo Peppler era (1982–1983) ===
Mary Jo Peppler took over the program along with Marilyn McReavy in 1982 and they were named the SEC coaches of the year in 1983. They had a record of 65–21.

=== Kathy Deboer era (1984–1991) ===
Kathy Deboer took over the program in 1984. She had a record of 209–97. In 1987 when the team won the SEC Championship and the SEC Tournament Championship, she was named SEC coach of the year and NCAA coach of the year. Deboer later served as the executive director of the American Volleyball Coaches Association for 17 years.

=== Fran Flory era (1992–1997) ===
Fran Flory took over the program in 1992. She had a record of 78–80.

=== Jona Braden era (1998–2004) ===
Jona Braden took over the program in 1998. She had a record of 90–119. The team had consecutive winning seasons for the first time since 1992–93.

=== Craig Skinner era (2005–present) ===
Craig Skinner took over the program in 2005. He is the winningest coach in Kentucky volleyball history and led Kentucky to their first-ever NCAA volleyball national championship in 2020. Skinner has led the team to 20 consecutive NCAA Tournaments. He has also led the Wildcats to SEC championships every year from 2017 to 2025. The Cats won the SEC postseason volleyball tournament in 2025, which had not been played since 2005. As of the end of the 2025 season, he has a record of 498–157.

Year	Head coach	Overall record	Conference record	Conference standing	Postseason
(Kentucky Women's Intercollegiate Conference) (1977–1980)
1977	Delphine Nemeth	19–14	–	–	
1978	Delphine Nemeth	32–22	6–3	–	AIAW Region II Champions
1979	Delphine Nemeth	35–18–1	6–2	–	–
1980	Delphine Nemeth	39–8	8–0	–	–
(SEC) (1981–present)
1981	Delphine Nemeth	20–12	4–0	–	
1982	Mary Jo Peppler	21–14	3–1	9th	–
1983	Mary Jo Peppler	44–7	5–0	1st	NCAA Regional Final
1984	Kathy Deboer	21–8	6–0	2nd	–
1985	Kathy Deboer	14–23	2–4	6th	–
1986	Kathy Deboer	22–12	4–2	3rd	–
1987	Kathy Deboer	31–2	7–0	1st	NCAA Regional Final
1988	Kathy Deboer	26–7	7–0	1st	NCAA Round of 16
1989	Kathy Deboer	24–11	6–2	3rd	–
1990	Kathy Deboer	22–12	7–1	2nd	NCAA Round of 16
1991	Kathy Deboer	24–13	8–6	4th	–
1992	Fran Flory	25–9	10–4	3rd	–
1993	Fran Flory	29–4	12–2	3rd	NCAA Second Round
1994	Fran Flory	13–21	8–6	3rd	–
1995	Fran Flory	10–18	7–7	3rd East	–
1996	Fran Flory	12–20	8–6	3rd East	–
1997	Fran Flory	14–17	4–10	5th East	–
1998	Jona Braden	16–14	7–9	5th East	–
1999	Jona Braden	16–15	6–8	4th East	–
2000	Jona Braden	6–21	3–11	5th East	–
2001	Jona Braden	13–15	6–8	7th	–
2002	Jona Braden	13–18	6–10	8th	–
2003	Jona Braden	14–18	6–10	8th	–
2004	Jona Braden	12–18	3–13	10th	–
2005	Craig Skinner	17–12	10–6	5th	NCAA First Round
2006	Craig Skinner	19–12	11–9	4th	NCAA 2nd Round
2007	Craig Skinner	22–10	13–7	4th	NCAA First Round
2008	Craig Skinner	26–6	17–3	2nd	NCAA First Round
2009	Craig Skinner	29–5	17–3	2nd	NCAA Round of 16
2010	Craig Skinner	17–14	11–9	T–5th	NCAA First Round
2011	Craig Skinner	28–5	17–3	2nd	NCAA Round of 16
2012	Craig Skinner	22–11	14–6	4th	NCAA Round of 16
2013	Craig Skinner	22–9	13–5	3rd	NCAA Second Round
2014	Craig Skinner	27–6	15–3	2nd	NCAA Second Round
2015	Craig Skinner	21–10	14–4	T–2nd	NCAA First Round
2016	Craig Skinner	23–8	15–3	3rd	NCAA Second Round
2017	Craig Skinner	29–4	17–1	T–1st	NCAA Regional Final
2018	Craig Skinner	26–5	18–0	1st	NCAA Round of 16
2019	Craig Skinner	25–7	16–2	T–1st	NCAA Round of 16
2020	Craig Skinner	24–1	19–1	1st	NCAA National Champions
2021	Craig Skinner	25–5	17–1	1st	NCAA Second Round
2022	Craig Skinner	22–8	15–3	T–1st	NCAA Round of 16
2023	Craig Skinner	21–8	17–1	1st	NCAA Round of 16
2024	Craig Skinner	23–8	14–2	1st	NCAA Regional Final
2025	Craig Skinner	30–3	15–0	1st	NCAA Runner-up
Total		1085–538–1	470–207		

== See also ==
- List of NCAA Division I women's volleyball programs
