= Monique Adams =

American volleyball player

Personal information
- Nationality: American
- Height: 6 ft 2 in (1.88 m)

Sport
- Country: United States
- Sport: Volleyball
- College team: LSU

Monique Adams is a former female American volleyball player who played collegiately for Louisiana State University (LSU) as an outside hitter. She was an AVCA All-American and played in back-to-back NCAA Women's Volleyball Championship Final Fours in 1990 and 1991. She was named MVP of the 1991 SEC Tournament and was also a member of the U.S. Junior National (B) Team in 1989. She was also one of only three players from LSU to be named to the AVCA All-American First-Team.

== See also ==
- 1991 NCAA Division I women's volleyball tournament
