= Craig Skinner (volleyball) =

American volleyball coach (born 1969)

Current position
- Title: Head coach
- Team: Kentucky
- Conference: SEC
- Record: 518–162 (.762)
- Annual salary: $525,000.00

Biographical details
- Born: June 4, 1969 (age 57); Muncie, Indiana
- Education: Ball State

Playing career
- 1990–1993: Ball State

Coaching career (HC unless noted)
- 1988–1989: Munciana Volleyball Club
- 1988–1989: Muncie Burris High School
- 1994–1998: Wisconsin (Assistant)
- 1999–2000: Ball State (Assistant, Men's)
- 2000–2004: Nebraska (Assistant)
- 2006: US Junior Women's National Team
- 2005–present: Kentucky

Accomplishments and honors

Championships
- 1x NCAA Champions (2020 (Note: Due to COVID-19, the NCAA moved its Division I championships in fall sports, including women's volleyball, from fall 2020 to spring 2021. It labeled the tournament as the "2020" edition, but the season as the "2020–21" season.)) 1x Under-20 NORCECA Gold Medal Champions 9x SEC Champions (2017–2025) 1x SEC Tournament Champions (2025)

Awards
- 1x AVCA National Coach of the Year (2021) 1x AVCA South Region Coach of the Year (2025); 1x Volleyball Magazine National Coach of the Year (2021); 3x AVCA Southeast Region Coach of the Year (2011, 2018, 2020) 7x SEC Coach of the Year (2005, 2017–2018, 2020, 2023–2025)

Records
- Winningest Coach in Kentucky volleyball history First-ever SEC team to win a volleyball NCAA title

John Craig Skinner (born June 4, 1969), known as Craig Skinner, is an American collegiate women's volleyball head coach at the University of Kentucky. He is the winningest coach in Kentucky volleyball history and led Kentucky to their first-ever NCAA volleyball national championship in 2020.

== Personal life ==
Skinner is a native of Muncie, Indiana and played volleyball at Ball State from 1990 to 1993 as an outside hitter. Prior to playing volleyball at Ball State, Skinner played football at Michigan for one year. Additionally, he is an avid golf player and lived in Wales for two years, taking up rugby and cricket while living there.

He is married to former Nebraska women's soccer assistant coach, Megan Bechtold Skinner. The couple have three children.

== Collegiate coaching career ==
Prior to collegiate coaching, Skinner also had coaching roles with high school and high school club volleyball, leading the Munciana Volleyball Club to become a national powerhouse. Skinner also coached at Muncie Burris High School.

=== Wisconsin (1994–1998) ===
Under head coach John Cook, Skinner was the women's volleyball assistant coach, helping them to an 68–35 record during his tenure.

=== Ball State (1999–2000) ===
In 1999, Skinner joined his alma mater and was the assistant coach on the men's volleyball team for nearly 2 seasons (leaving midway through the 2000 season), helping Ball State to wins over nationally ranked opponents.

=== Nebraska (2000–2004) ===
Cook hired Skinner at Nebraska as an assistant coach in 2000 and was promoted to head assistant coach in 2003. Skinner helped the team to the 2000 NCAA title and undefeated season and four Big 12 titles. Overall, Skinner helped lead Nebraska to a 154–11 record.

Skinner revealed in 2010 that Nebraska made a metal monument of him as a surprise but Skinner did not want one and made Nebraska destroy it.

=== Kentucky (2005–present) ===
After the 2004 season, Skinner had several head coaching opportunities but chose Kentucky because of the comfort level with the campus, UK being a flagship university, the proximity to the talent hotbeds in the Midwest and soccer opportunities for his wife.

Skinner took over at Kentucky in 2004 and is the program's all-time winningest head coach. Skinner has led the Wildcats to 16 consecutive NCAA Tournaments, including tallying 20 or more wins in 12 of the last 14 seasons. In the five years before his arrival, Kentucky didn't post a winning season and hadn't made the NCAA tournament since 1993. Skinner posted a 17–13 record in his first year, won SEC coach of the year and qualified for the postseason. The Wildcats haven't missed the NCAA tournament in the 16 years since.

In the 2020 Women's volleyball tournament, Skinner made history and led Kentucky to their first NCAA title in women's volleyball. The Wildcats only lost 2 sets across five tournament matches and became only the eleventh school to win an NCAA Division I volleyball championship.

During his tenure, the Wildcats have amassed 23 All-America first, second or third team distinctions, while UK has hauled in 61 All-Southeastern Conference honors in his 15 seasons – including the 2008, 2018, 2019 and 2020 SEC Player of the Year, 2006, 2016, 2017 and 2018 SEC Freshman of the Year, 2010, 2011, 2012, 2014, 2015, 2016, 2017, 2018, 2019 and 2020 SEC Libero of the Year and the 2005 SEC Defensive Player of the Year.

In 2019, Skinner signed a contract extension through the 2023–2024 season. Skinner signed another contract extension on July 1, 2022, through the 2027 season.

Skinner's success at the helm of the program continued after winning the national title in 2020. In 2022 Kentucky earned its 6th straight conference title (tying with Florida for first place). Several players received conference and national accolades as well: Sophomore setter Emma Grome was named the SEC player of the year, while Grome, senior outside hitter Adanna Rollins and junior opposite hitter Reagan Rutherford all received AVCA All-Southeast Region First team selections. In 2023, Kentucky won its 7th straight conference title as Skinner was named the 2023 SEC co-coach of the year. In 2025, Coach Skinner again led the Kentucky Wildcats to the Final Four and National Championship game.

== Head coaching record ==
Record table
| Season | Team | Overall | Conference | Standing | Postseason |
|---|---|---|---|---|---|
Kentucky Wildcats (SEC) (2005–present)
| 2005 | Kentucky | 17–13 | 13–3 | 5th | NCAA first round |
| 2006 | Kentucky | 19–12 | 11–9 | 4th | NCAA second round |
| 2007 | Kentucky | 22–9 | 13–7 | 4th | NCAA first round |
| 2008 | Kentucky | 26–6 | 17–3 | 2nd | NCAA first round |
| 2009 | Kentucky | 29–5 | 17–3 | 2nd | NCAA regional semifinals |
| 2010 | Kentucky | 17–14 | 11–9 | T–5th | NCAA first round |
| 2011 | Kentucky | 28–6 | 17–3 | 2nd | NCAA regional semifinal |
| 2012 | Kentucky | 22–11 | 14–6 | 4th | NCAA regional semifinal |
| 2013 | Kentucky | 22–9 | 13–5 | 3rd | NCAA second round |
| 2014 | Kentucky | 27–6 | 15–3 | 2nd | NCAA second round |
| 2015 | Kentucky | 21–10 | 14–4 | T–2nd | NCAA first round |
| 2016 | Kentucky | 23–8 | 15–3 | 3rd | NCAA second round |
| 2017 | Kentucky | 29–4 | 17–1 | T–1st | NCAA Regional final |
| 2018 | Kentucky | 26–5 | 18–0 | 1st | NCAA regional semifinal |
| 2019 | Kentucky | 25–7 | 16–2 | T–1st | NCAA regional semifinal |
| 2020 | Kentucky | 24–1 | 19–1 | 1st | NCAA Champions |
| 2021 | Kentucky | 25–5 | 17–1 | 1st | NCAA second round |
| 2022 | Kentucky | 22–8 | 15–3 | T–1st | NCAA regional semifinal |
| 2023 | Kentucky | 21–8 | 17–1 | 1st | NCAA regional semifinal |
| 2024 | Kentucky | 23–7 | 14–2 | 1st | NCAA Regional final |
| 2025 | Kentucky | 30–3 | 15–0 | 1st | NCAA Runner-up |
| 2026 | Kentucky | 20–5 | 12–3 | T–2nd | TBD |
| Craig Skinner: | | 518–162 (.762) | 330–72 (.821) | | |
| Total: | | 518–162 (.762) | | | |
National champion Postseason invitational champion Conference regular season champion Conference regular season and conference tournament champion Division regular season champion Division regular season and conference tournament champion Conference tournament champion
