= Memorial Coliseum (University of Kentucky) =

Indoor arena at the University of Kentucky

- The House That Rupp Built
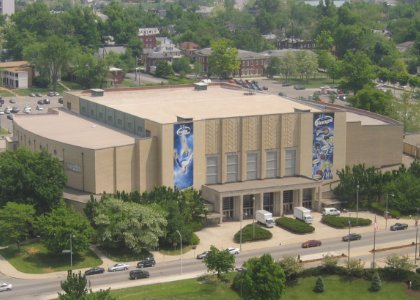
- Interactive map of Memorial Coliseum
- Location: 201 Avenue of Champions; Lexington, Kentucky 40506
- Coordinates: 38°02′22″N 84°30′01″W
- Owner: University of Kentucky
- Operator: University of Kentucky
- Capacity: 6,250

Construction
- Opened: December 1, 1950
- Cost: $4 million

Tenants
- Kentucky Wildcats (Women's basketball, gymnastics, volleyball and STUNT)

Memorial Coliseum, coloquailly known as "The House That Rupp Built" and "Historic Memorial Coliseum", is a 6,250-seat multi-purpose arena in Lexington, Kentucky. The facility, which opened in 1950, is home to four women's teams at the University of Kentucky – basketball, volleyball, gymnastics, and stunt. Before Rupp Arena opened in 1976, it also housed the men's basketball team. Memorial Coliseum also housed the university's swimming and diving team prior to the 1989 completion of the Lancaster Aquatics Center.

== History ==
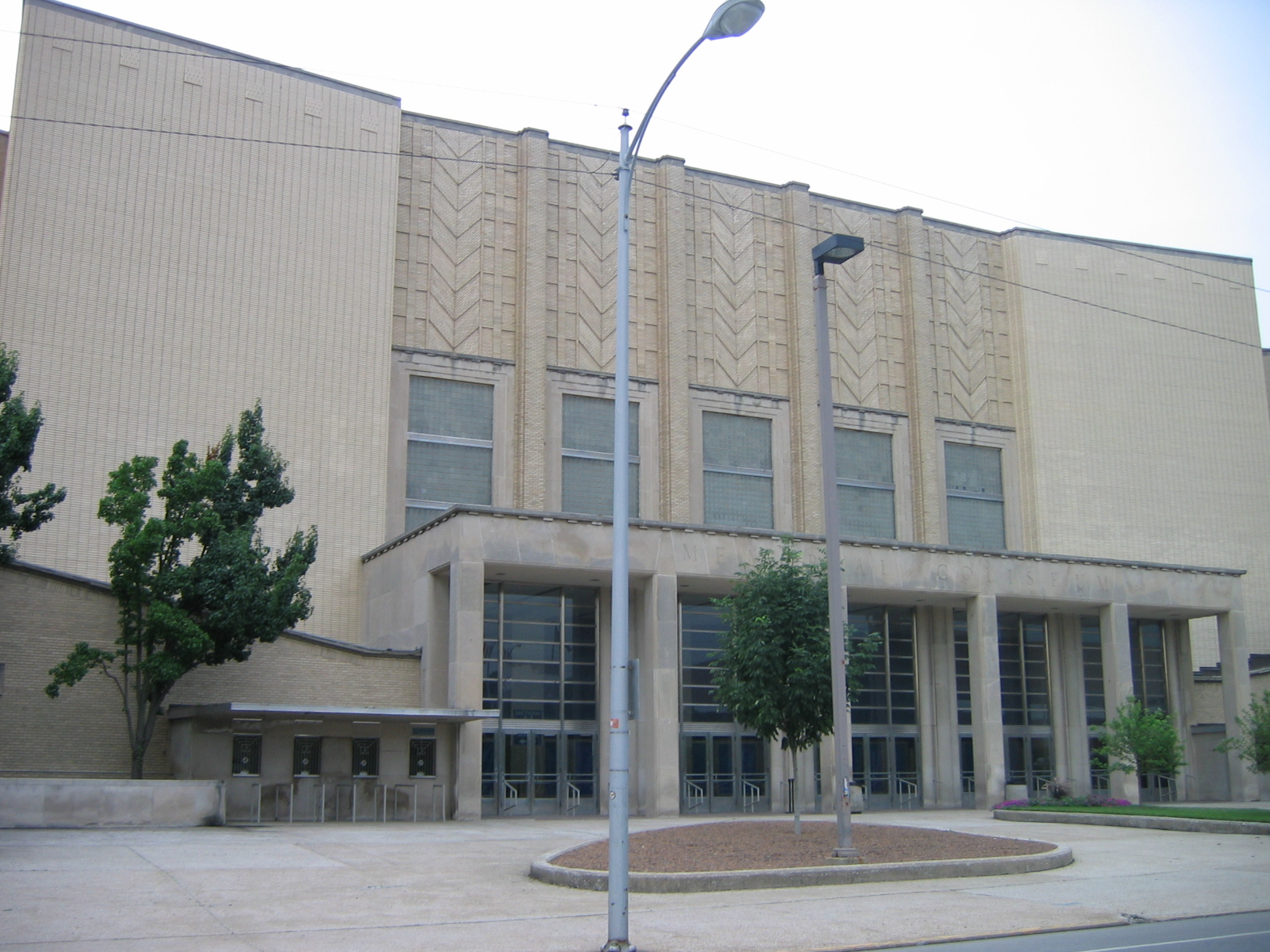
Facade in 2008

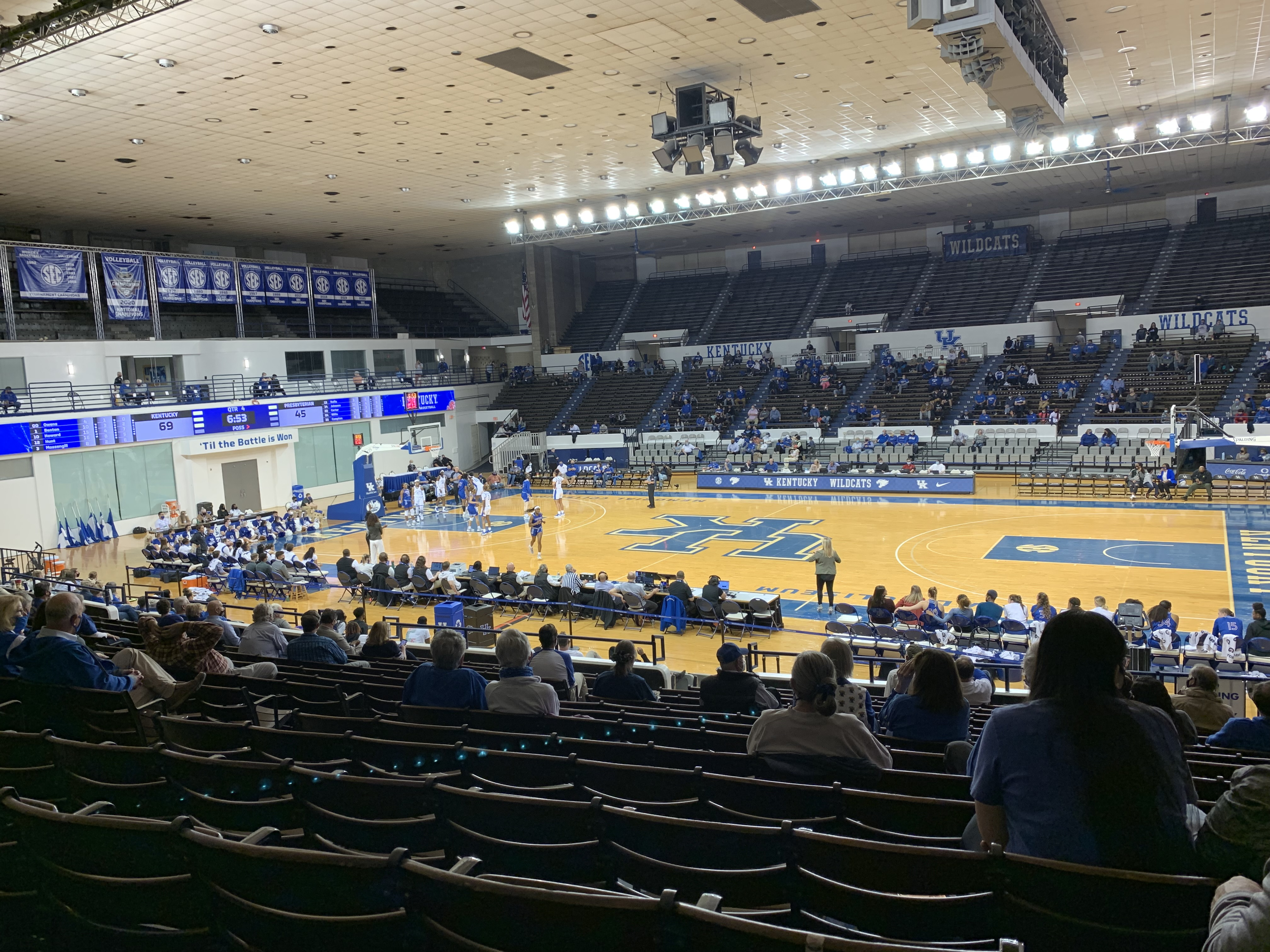
Interior in 2021

The facility was built as a memorial to Kentuckians who had died during World War I, World War II and the Korean War. Later, the names of all Kentuckians who died in the Vietnam War were added. Originally, it had an official capacity of 12,000, making it the largest arena in the South at the time. However, the Coliseum frequently drew crowds of over 13,000 for many UK basketball games. A major renovation, completed in 1990, reduced the seating capacity to 8,500 and added an elaborate weight training facility, new offices for the basketball and athletics programs, a players' lounge, and a team meeting room. The seating is now mostly located on the sidelines. The building is known for its air of great tradition. While it was the home of the UK men's basketball team, it hosted the NCAA Men's Basketball Tournament ten times, four times as a regional site (1957, 1958, 1967, 1968) and six more as a sub-regional site (1955, 1959, 1960, 1962, 1967, 1975). As home to the University of Kentucky Wildcats, it saw two NCAA men's basketball national championship teams (1951, 1958), two NCAA men's basketball runner-up teams (1966, 1975), one NIT Men's Basketball champion (1976), and 16 Southeastern Conference (SEC) Men's Basketball regular season champions. Overall, in 26 seasons (1950–51 to 1975–76), the University of Kentucky Wildcats men's basketball team posted a home record of 307–38 (.890). Memorial hosted a first-round game in the 2009 National Invitation Tournament on March 17, 2009, between the Wildcats and the UNLV Runnin' Rebels, with the Wildcats winning 70–60. The game was held at Memorial instead of Rupp Arena due to a scheduling conflict with the KHSAA boys' high school basketball state tournament scheduled at Rupp that week.

The Coliseum was also the home of the Kentucky Boys' Sweet Sixteen State Basketball Tournament from 1951 to 1964. Since then, it has hosted numerous high school basketball tournaments over the years.

The Coliseum stands across the street from the former site of Stoll Field/McLean Stadium, the football team's home before moving to the venue now known as Kroger Field in 1973. Prior to the building of the Coliseum, the Kentucky basketball teams played less than three blocks away at Alumni Gymnasium, a 2,800-seat arena built in 1924 and now converted to a student fitness center.

In July 2022, athletic director Mitch Barnhart announced that Memorial Coliseum would be receiving extensive upgrades. Air conditioning would be added to the building for the first time, as well as seating upgrades, and the construction of new event space. The renovations were expected to last for one year, displacing all four teams who call the arena home during the 2023–24 athletics season. On April 18, 2023, Barnhart announced that all home gymnastics and volleyball matches, as well as the majority of women's basketball games, during the 2023–24 season would be held at Rupp Arena. A select number of women's basketball games were played at Transylvania University's Clive M. Beck Center on days when there were scheduling conflicts at Rupp Arena. The $82 million renovation was completed and the arena reopened in August 2024, with the capacity further reduced to the current 6,250.

== See also ==
- Cityscape of Lexington, Kentucky
- Joe Craft Center
- University of Kentucky
- List of NCAA Division I basketball arenas
- List of University of Kentucky buildings
