= Fran Flory =

American volleyball coach

Current position
- Title: Head coach
- Team: LSU
- Conference: SEC

Playing career
- 1980–1983: University of Texas
- Position: Outside Hitter

Coaching career (HC unless noted)
- 1986: Wittenberg
- 1987: Texas A&M (asst.)
- 1988–1991: LSU (asst.)
- 1992: Southeastern Louisiana
- 1993–1997: Kentucky
- 1998–2021: LSU
- 2014–2016: LSU (beach)
- 2024-present: Vegas Thrill

Accomplishments and honors

Championships
- 7 SEC Western Division Championships (2005, 2006, 2007, 2008, 2009, 2010, 2011); 1 SEC Championship (2009)

Awards
- AVCA Hall of Fame (2022); SEC Coach of the Year (2009); AVCA South Region Coach of the Year (2009); Louisiana Coach of the Year (2001, 2005, 2006, 2009, 2010)

Fran Flory (born April 30, c. 1962) is an American retired head coach of the LSU Tigers women's indoor volleyball team and former head coach of the LSU Tigers women's beach volleyball team. She previously coached the Kentucky Wildcats women's volleyball team from 1992 to 1997.

== Coaching career ==
Flory is the former women's volleyball head coach at the University of Kentucky, Southeastern Louisiana University and Wittenberg University.

She is first in all-time SEC wins and all-time wins at LSU, ahead of her predecessor, Scott Luster, who won 308 games in 13 years. Her LSU teams have captured seven consecutive SEC Western Division championships (2005–2011) as well as the 2009 SEC championship.

Flory began her coaching career as head coach at Wittenberg University, where she coached for one season (posting a record of 11–21) in 1986. In 1987, she became an assistant coach at Texas A&M.

After one season at Texas A&M, Flory, a Baton Rouge, Louisiana native moved to LSU as an assistant for four years under head coach Scott Luster. She served as a graduate assistant coach in 1988, before being named a full-time assistant in 1989. During her four seasons as a member of the Lady Tigers (now Tigers) coaching staff, Flory helped LSU to unprecedented success with three SEC championships, three SEC Tournament championships and two NCAA Final Four appearances.

In 1992, Flory left LSU to assume the head coaching position at Southeastern Louisiana University. In her one season at Southeastern Louisiana, she led the Lady Lions to a 21–13 record. In March 1993, Flory returned to the SEC as she became an assistant coach at the University of Kentucky. Five months later, she was named the head coach as then-UK coach Kathy DeBoer was named an associate athletic director at the school.

In her first season at Kentucky in 1993, Flory led the Lady Kats to a 29–4 record, while advancing to the second round of the NCAA Tournament. For her efforts, she was named the 1993 Tachikara/AVCA Region IV Coach of the Year. In five seasons at UK, Flory compiled a 78–80 record with the Lady Kats/Wildcats (the nickname changed in 1995).

In 1998, Flory returned to Baton Rouge, Louisiana as head coach of the LSU women's indoor volleyball team.

When LSU established a varsity beach volleyball program starting in the 2013–2014 season, Flory also became head coach of that team. She remained the beach volleyball head coach until 2016, when Russell Brock was promoted from associate head coach to head coach and Flory focused on her duties as indoor women's head coach.

Flory is a member of the American Volleyball Coaches Association, Flory has also assisted in coordinating both the Louisiana Senior Olympic Games and the Special Olympics, and hosting the Senior Olympic Games in 2001. She is also a member of the United States Volleyball Association coaching accreditation program.

Flory was inducted into the American Volleyball Coaches Association Hall of Fame in 2022.

In November 2023, the Vegas Thrill of the Pro Volleyball Federation named Flory as their inaugural head coach of the franchise.

== Playing career ==
A 1984 graduate of the University of Texas, Flory has also experienced much success as a player. In 1981, she was a member of Texas' AIAW National Championship squad. She received All-Southwest Conference and All-South Region honors during three seasons with the Longhorns.

== Collegiate head coaching record ==
=== Indoor ===
Record table
Season	Team	Overall	Conference	Standing	Postseason
Wittenberg (North Coast Athletic Conference) (1986–1986)
1986	Wittenberg	11–21			
Wittenberg:		11–21			
Southeastern Louisiana (Southland Conference) (1992–1992)
1992	Southeastern Louisiana	21–13			
Southeastern Louisiana:		21–13			
Kentucky (Southeastern Conference) (1993–1997)
1993	Kentucky	29–4	12–2	3rd	NCAA 2nd Round
1994	Kentucky	13–21	8–6	3rd	
1995	Kentucky	10–18	7–7	3rd (East)	
1996	Kentucky	12–20	8–6	3rd (East)	
1997	Kentucky	14–17	4–10	5th (East)	
Kentucky:		78–80	39–31		
LSU (Southeastern Conference) (1998–present)
1998	LSU	15–16	5–10	4th (West)	
1999	LSU	17–15	7–8	3rd (West)	
2000	LSU	15–17	6–9	3rd (West)	
2001	LSU	16–11	10–5	2nd (West)	
2002	LSU	17–11	9–7	2nd (West)	
2003	LSU	11–19	6–10	3rd (West)	
2004	LSU	17–12	8–8	3rd (West)	
2005	LSU	21–8	11–5	T-1st (West)	NCAA 1st Round
2006	LSU	26–6	16–4	1st (West)	NCAA 1st Round
2007	LSU	25–8	15–5	1st (West)	NCAA 2nd Round
2008	LSU	18–10	13–7	1st (West)	NCAA 1st Round
2009	LSU	25–7	18–2	1st (West), SEC Champions	NCAA 2nd Round
2010	LSU	25–5	16–4	1st (West)	NCAA 1st Round
2011	LSU	19–11	12–8	1st (West)	
2012	LSU	12–17	8–12	4th (West)	
2013	LSU	19–13	8–10	9th	NCAA 2nd Round
2014	LSU	20–9	14–4	3rd	NCAA 2nd Round
2015	LSU	9–20	5–13	12th	
2016	LSU	9–20	4–14	12th	
2017	LSU	20–10	11–7	4th	NCAA First Round
2018	LSU	12–17	7–11	T-7th	
LSU:		368–262	206–168		
Total:		478–376			
National champion Postseason invitational champion Conference regular season champion Conference regular season and conference tournament champion Division regular season champion Division regular season and conference tournament champion Conference tournament champion

=== Beach ===
Record table
Season	Team	Overall	Conference	Standing	Postseason
LSU (Independent) (2013–2015)
2013–14	LSU	6–10			
2014–15	LSU	14–9			
LSU (Coastal Collegiate Sports Association) (2016–present)
2015–16	LSU	20–9			
LSU:		40–28			
Total:		40–28			
National champion Postseason invitational champion Conference regular season champion Conference regular season and conference tournament champion Division regular season champion Division regular season and conference tournament champion Conference tournament champion
