= Brittnee Cooper =

American volleyball player (born 1988)

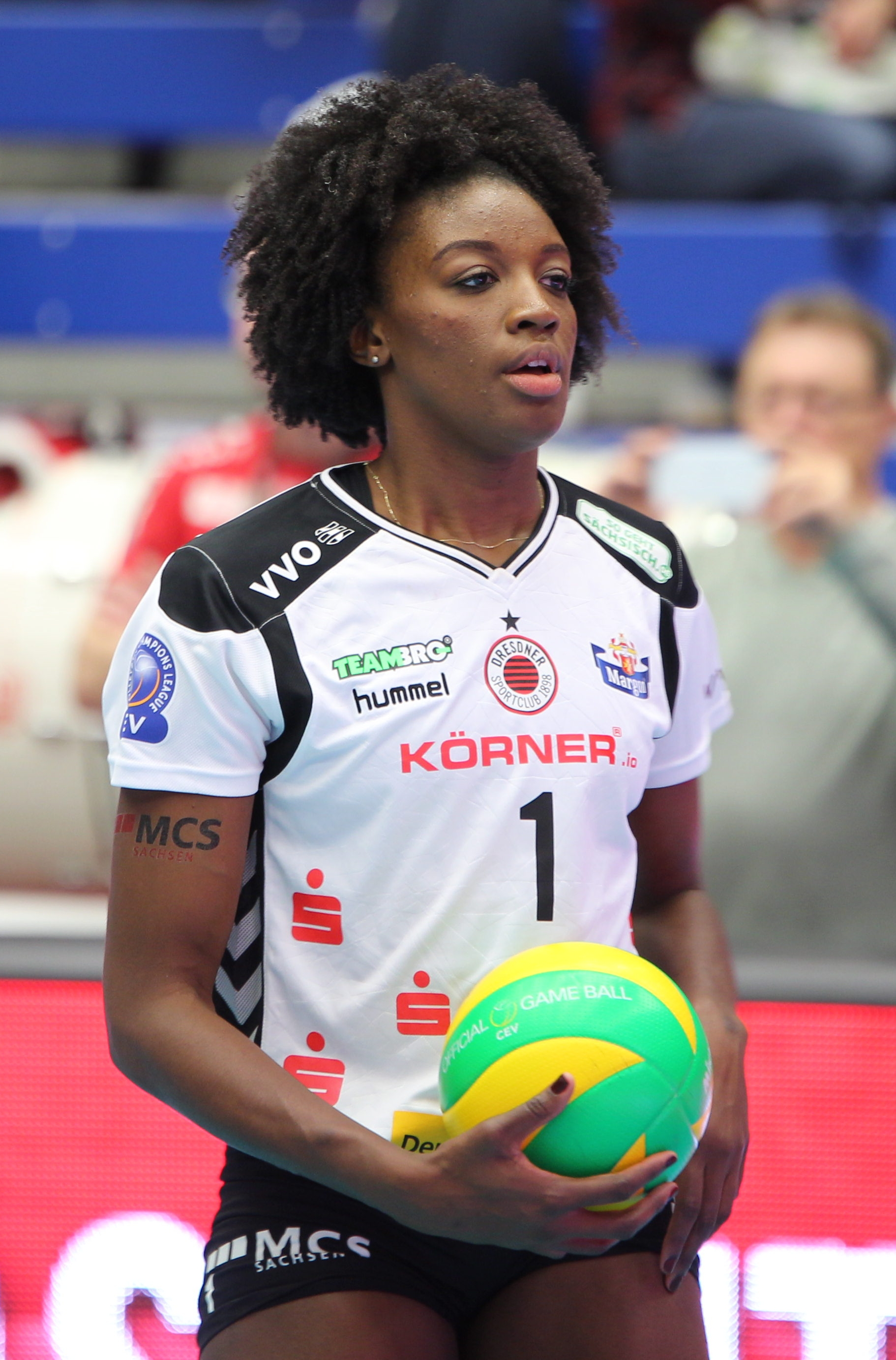

Personal information
- Nationality: American
- Born: February 26, 1988 (age 38)
- Height: 6 ft 3 in (1.91 m)

Sport
- Country: United States
- Sport: Volleyball
- College team: LSU
- Club: Atom Trefl Sopot; Dresdner SC

Brittnee Cooper (born February 26, 1988) is an American volleyball player. She played for Rabita Baku for the 2013/14 season in the Azerbaijan Superleague as a middle-blocker. She played collegiately for Louisiana State University (LSU) as a middle-blocker. She was named 1st-team AVCA All-American and SEC Player of the Year in 2009.

== Career ==
Cooper was also a member of the U.S. National A2 team in 2008 and 2009.

Cooper's club, Rabita Baku, won the bronze medal of the 2013–14 CEV Champions League after falling 0–3 to the Russian Dinamo Kazan in the semifinals, but defeating the Turkish Eczacıbaşı VitrA Istanbul, 3–0, in the third place match.

== Awards ==
=== Clubs ===
- 2013–14 CEV Champions League – Bronze medal, with Rabita Baku
