= Mary Jo Peppler =

American volleyball player and coach

Personal information
- Full name: Mary Joan Peppler
- Born: October 17, 1944 (age 82); Rockford, Illinois, U.S.
- Height: 183 cm (6 ft 0 in)
Medal record
Women's volleyball
Representing the United States
Pan American Games
Gold medal – first place	1967 Winnipeg	Team

Mary Joan "Mary Jo" Peppler (born October 17, 1944) is an American former volleyball player and coach. Peppler was inducted into the Volleyball Hall of Fame in 1990. She also played professional basketball with the New Jersey Gems of the Women's Professional Basketball League for one season.

== Early life ==
Peppler was born in Rockford, Illinois. At the age of six she moved to Texas. She signed up for the Girls Athletic Association in the fourth grade; it was then that she learned of her love for volleyball. Peppler attended Sul Ross State and was a six time All-American.

== Coaching ==
Peppler has coached (as the assistant or head coach) at Utah State, Florida, and Kentucky.

While at Sul Ross State (Alpine, TX) she guided her team to back to back Division I National championships, going 70-0 over two seasons. She guided E. Pluribus Unum of Houston, Texas to crowns in 1972 in Salt Lake City and 1973 in Duluth, Minnesota, and Utah State University to the championship in 1981 in Arlington, Texas.

From 1991–96, Peppler mentored the number-one women's beach volleyball team of Karolyn Kirby and Liz Masakayan. In the 2000s, she coached Bulgaria's women's Olympic beach volleyball team, Lina and Petia Yanchulova.

In 2017, Pepper began serving as assistant coach to head coach Karolyn Kirby at the University of Saint Katherine in San Marcos, CA in the university's first year of having both a men's and women's volleyball team.

== Olympics ==
Peppler's international experience includes playing on the 1964 U.S. Olympic Team, on the 1967 U.S. Gold Medal Pan American Team (named to All Tournament Team), and at the 1970 World Championships where she was named the tournament's most outstanding player. In 1975 she won ABC's inaugural Women's Superstars competition and in the softball throw competition threw the ball over the judge's head and the fence behind him.

== Professional ==
Professionally, Peppler was the player/coach for the El Paso Sol (1975) and Phoenix Heat (1976) of the International Volleyball Association as well as Major League Volleyball's New York Liberties in 1987 and 1988.

Other honors Peppler received include All-Star honors in 1987 and 1988, All-Pro award in 1987, and the USVBA's "All-Time Great Player" Award in 1982. She was inducted into the Women's Sports Hall of Fame in 1983.

In 1978-79, Peppler joined the New Jersey Gems of the brand-new Women's Professional Basketball League.

== Books ==
- Wrote Inside Volleyball for Women (Copyright 1977)
- Contributed to Coaching tips for the 90's (Copyright 1991)
- Wrote Chapter 10 of the Volleyball Coaching Bible entitled "Using New and Proven Teaching Techniques" (Copyright 2002)
