= LSU Tigers women's volleyball =

American college volleyball team

- University: Louisiana State University
- Head coach: Tonya Johnson (5th season)
- Conference: SEC
- Location: Baton Rouge, Louisiana, US
- Home arena: Pete Maravich Assembly Center (capacity: 13,215)
- Colors: Purple and gold

AIAW/NCAA tournament semifinal
- 1990, 1991

AIAW/NCAA Regional Final
- 1986, 1990, 1991

AIAW/NCAA regional semifinal
- 1986, 1989, 1990, 1991, 1992

AIAW/NCAA tournament appearance
- 1986, 1987, 1989, 1990, 1991, 1992, 2005, 2006, 2007, 2008, 2009, 2010, 2014, 2017, 2022

Conference tournament champion
- 1986, 1989, 1990, 1991

Conference regular season champion
- 1986, 1989, 1990, 1991, 2009

The LSU Tigers (Note: LSU uses the nickname of "Lady Tigers" only for the sports that have both men's and women's teams at the school. Since LSU only sponsors volleyball for women, that team uses "Tigers" instead.) women's volleyball is the team who represents Louisiana State University in the sport of indoor volleyball. The Tigers compete currently in Division I of the National Collegiate Athletic Association (NCAA) and the Southeastern Conference (SEC), and play their home matches in the Pete Maravich Assembly Center on the university's Baton Rouge, Louisiana campus. Since the 2022 season, the head coach is Tonya Johnson, after former long time head coach Fran Flory announced her retirement.

== History ==
The LSU Tigers volleyball team, originally known as the "Lady Tigers", played its first season in 1974. The first coach of the Lady Tigers was Jinks Coleman who compiled a record of 75–22 (.773) at LSU from 1974 to 1976. Then starting in 1977, Gerry Owens become the head volleyball coach at LSU and amassed a record of 95–49 (.660) during her 4 years as LSU head coach which ended in 1980. The Lady Tigers brought in a new head coach for the 1981 season. Ruth Nelson guided the Lady Tigers for 4 years from 1981 to 1984 and had a record of 128–98 (.566).

In 1985, Scott Luster was named head volleyball coach at LSU. During his 13 years as head coach which ended after the 1997 season, he compiled a record of 308–161 (.657). During his tenure, the Lady Tigers made two Final Fours and made the NCAA tournament 6 times in 1986, 1987 and 1989 through 1992. The Lady Tigers also won both the SEC regular season and SEC tournament championships in 1986, 1989, 1990 and 1991. Four LSU Lady Tigers were chosen All-American under Coach Luster.

In 1997, Fran Flory was hired as head coach for the 1998 season. During her tenure, the Tigers have compiled a record of 336–235 (.588). The Tigers have made the NCAA Tournament 6 times in 2005, 2006, 2007, 2008, 2009 and 2010. The Tigers also won the 2009 SEC regular season championship. Flory has coached one All-American during her tenure at LSU.

== American Volleyball Coaches Association ==
=== All-Americans ===
Player	Year(s)-Team
Wendy Stammer	1986–2nd Team
Monique Adams	1990–1st Team, 1991–1st Team
Angie Miller	1991–2nd Team, 1992–1st Team
Daniela Reis	1991–2nd Team, 1992–2nd Team
Brittnee Cooper	2009–1st Team

== Year-by-year results ==
Year	Head Coach	Overall Record	Conference Record	Standing	Division	Postseason
LSU Tigers (Southeastern Conference) (1974–present)
1974	Jinks Coleman	23–6				
1975	Jinks Coleman	27–11				
1976	Jinks Coleman	25–5				
1977	Gerry Owens	41–9				
1978	Gerry Owens	28–2				
1979	Gerry Owens	15–17				
1980	Gerry Owens	11–21				
1981	Ruth Nelson	35–24				
1982	Ruth Nelson	44–25				
1983	Ruth Nelson	31–26	4–1	2nd		
1984	Ruth Nelson	18–23	4–2	3rd		
1985	Scott Luster	33–10	5–1	T-1st		
1986	Scott Luster	35–9	5–1	T-1st		NCAA Tournament
1987	Scott Luster	25–11	6–1	2nd		NCAA Tournament
1988	Scott Luster	22–13	5–2	T-2nd		
1989	Scott Luster	30–8	8–0	1st		NCAA Tournament
1990	Scott Luster	34–7	8–0	T-1st		NCAA Final Four
1991	Scott Luster	35–2	13–1	1st		NCAA Final Four
1992	Scott Luster	26–9	12–2	2nd		NCAA Tournament
1993	Scott Luster	21–16	8–6	4th		
1994	Scott Luster	8–23	4–11	9th		
1995	Scott Luster	20–12	8–7	2nd	West	
1996	Scott Luster	10–20	6–9	4th	West	
1997	Scott Luster	9–21	0–15	6th	West	
1998	Fran Flory	15–16	5–10	T-3rd	West	
1999	Fran Flory	17–15	7–8	T-3rd	West	
2000	Fran Flory	15–17	6–9	3rd	West	
2001	Fran Flory	16–11	10–5	T-2nd	West	
2002	Fran Flory	17–11	9–7	2nd	West	
2003	Fran Flory	11–19	6–10	3rd	West	
2004	Fran Flory	17–12	8–8	3rd	West	
2005	Fran Flory	21–8	11–5	T-1st	West	NCAA First Round
2006	Fran Flory	26–6	16–4	1st	West	NCAA First Round
2007	Fran Flory	25–8	15–5	1st	West	NCAA Second Round
2008	Fran Flory	18–10	13–7	1st	West	NCAA First Round
2009	Fran Flory	25–7	18–2	1st	West	NCAA Second Round
2010	Fran Flory	25–5	16–4	1st	West	NCAA First Round
2011	Fran Flory	19–11	12–8	1st	West	
2012	Fran Flory	12–17	8–12	T-3rd	West	
2013	Fran Flory	19–13	8–10	9th		
2014	Fran Flory	20–9	14–4	3rd		NCAA Second Round
2015	Fran Flory	9-20	5–13	12th		
2016	Fran Flory	9–20	4–14	12th		
2017	Fran Flory	20–10	11–7	4th		NCAA First Round
2018	Fran Flory	12–17	7–11	T-7th		
2019	Fran Flory	15–13	9–9	T-7th		
2020	Fran Flory	9–13	9–13	8th		
2021	Fran Flory	13–14	9–9	7th		
2022	Tonya Johnson	16–14	9–9	7th		
2023	Tonya Johnson	11–17	6–12	T-9th		
2024	Tonya Johnson	15–12	7–9	T-8th		
2025	Tonya Johnson	13–14	6–9	T-10th		
Total		1066–689	360–292			

== Arena ==
=== Pete Maravich Assembly Center ===
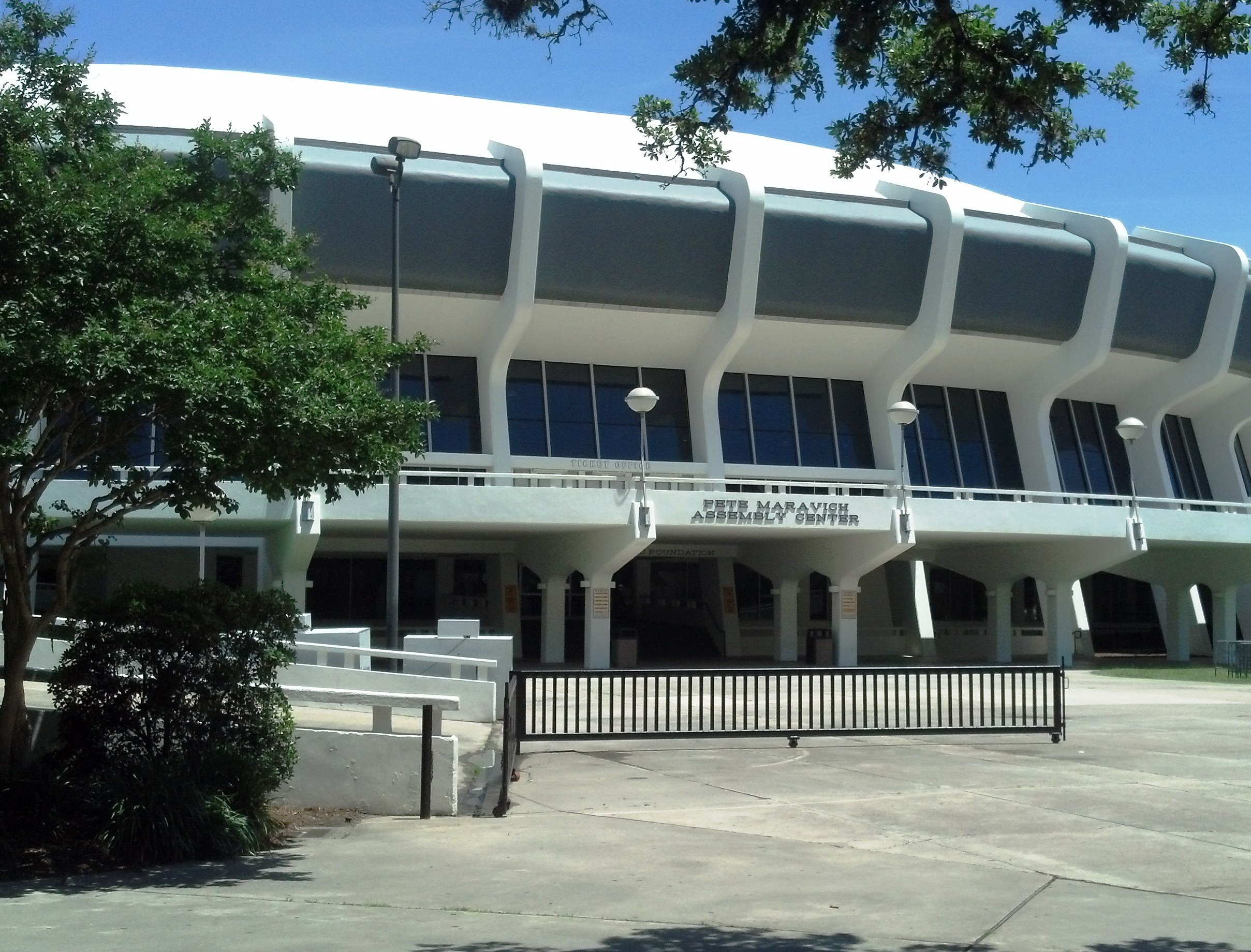
Pete Maravich Assembly Center

The Pete Maravich Assembly Center is a 13,215-seat multi-purpose arena in Baton Rouge, Louisiana. The arena opened in 1972 and is home of the LSU Tigers volleyball team. It was originally known as the LSU Assembly Center, but was renamed in honor of Pete Maravich, a Tiger basketball legend, shortly after his death in 1988. The Maravich Center is known to locals as "The PMAC" or "The Palace that Pete Built", or by its more nationally known nickname, "The Deaf Dome", coined by Dick Vitale.

The slightly oval building is located directly to the north of Tiger Stadium, and its bright-white roof can be seen in many telecasts of that stadium. The arena concourse is divided into four quadrants: Pete Maravich Pass, The Walk of Champions, Heroes Hall and Midway of Memories. The quadrants highlight former LSU Tiger athletes, individual and team awards and memorabilia pertaining to the history of LSU Tigers volleyball.

== Practice and Training facilities ==
=== LSU Volleyball Practice facility ===
The LSU Tigers Volleyball Practice facility is located in the Pete Maravich Assembly Center. It includes a state-of-the-art locker room facility, film room, equipment room and training rooms off the arenas southwest corridor. The auxiliary gym located underneath the north section of the arena is a volleyball-only practice facility.

=== LSU Strength and Conditioning facility ===
The LSU Tigers basketball strength training and conditioning facility is located in the LSU Strength and Conditioning facility. Built in 1997, it is located adjacent to Tiger Stadium. Measuring 10,000-square feet with a flat surface, it has 28 multi-purpose power stations, 36 assorted selectorized machines and 10 dumbbell stations along with a plyometric specific area, medicine balls, hurdles, plyometric boxes and assorted speed and agility equipment. It also features 2 treadmills, 4 stationary bikes, 2 elliptical cross trainers, a stepper and stepmill.

== Head coaches ==
Name	Years	Record at LSU
Jinks Coleman	1974–1976	75–22 Overall
Gerry Owens	1977–1980	95–49 Overall
Ruth Nelson	1981–1984	128–98 Overall, 8–3 SEC
Scott Luster	1985–1997	308–161 Overall, 160–103 SEC
Fran Flory	1998–2021	368–262 Overall, 206–168 SEC
Tonya Johnson	2022–present	

== See also ==
- List of NCAA Division I women's volleyball programs
