= Scott Luster =

American volleyball coach

Coaching career (HC unless noted)
- 1980–1984: Louisville
- 1985–1997: LSU
- 1998–2007: Bradley

Head coaching record
- Overall: 582–415

Accomplishments and honors

Championships
- 2 Metro Championships, 4 SEC Championships (1985, 1986, 1990, 1991)

Scott Luster is an American volleyball coach. He is the former women's volleyball head coach, at Bradley University, Louisiana State University and the University of Louisville. He holds a collegiate coaching career record of 582–415.

== Career ==
=== Louisville Cardinals ===
Luster's collegiate coaching career began in 1980 at the University of Louisville, where he posted a record of 140–90 and won two Metro Conference titles and received a pair of NCAA Tournament bids until he left for LSU after the 1984 season.

=== LSU Tigers ===
Luster achieved major success after moving to LSU in 1985. In his first season at Baton Rouge, the Lady Tigers claimed the Southeastern Conference title while recording a 33–10 record. The very next season LSU won another SEC title, as well as an NCAA berth with a 35–9 mark.

Luster's best years at LSU were 1990 and 1991, when his teams were a combined 69–9, won two more SEC titles, and made two NCAA Final Four appearances. During the 1990 season, LSU put together a 32-match home-court winning streak, which ranks as the 10th longest such streak in NCAA history.

Overall, Luster was 308–161 in 13 seasons at LSU, including an 88–56 record in SEC contests. His teams won five SEC titles, earned six NCAA Tournament berths and his 1991 team's .946 winning percentage (a 35–2 record) is the best single-season mark in SEC history. Luster was named the SEC Coach of the Year three times, and coached six All-Americans. His last season as LSU women's head coach was 1997.

=== Bradley Braves ===
Luster fashioned an overall record of 134–164 during his ten seasons (1998–2007) at Bradley. Due to poor performance in the 2007 season, Bradley decided to not renew his contract at the end of the year.

=== Other volleyball roles ===
Luster began his coaching career with the Orlando Women's Volleyball Club, leading it to the Florida AAU Championship. After moving to Columbus, Ohio, Luster coached five seasons at Whitehall-Yearling High School, winning the 1979 AAA state championship and being honored by the Columbus Dispatch as the Coach of the Year.

Luster has served on both the executive committee and Board of Directors for the United States Volleyball Association. He also was a highly rated referee on the international level from 1982 to 1996, allowing him to see the best volleyball competition in the world. In 1989, Luster was a recipient of the United States Volleyball Association Leader in Volleyball Award, an honor which is bestowed upon those who have contributed to the sport in all phases of the game.

Luster has officiated three NCAA Men's Championships (1984, 1990 and 1992) and had a strong involvement in the U.S. Olympic Festival, coaching the Midwest squad to a silver medal in 1978 and the South squad to a gold medal in 1987, serving as head referee in 1982, and as the East Coordinator in 1983.
