= Jinks Coleman =

Biographical details
- Born: 1944; Lake St. John, Louisiana, U.S.
- Died: October 20, 2000 (aged 55–56); Baton Rouge, Louisiana, U.S.
- Education: Northwestern State University

Coaching career (HC unless noted)
- 1975–1979: LSU (women's basketball)
- 1974–1976: LSU (women's volleyball)

Head coaching record
- Overall: 91–32 (basketball), 75–22 (volleyball)

Jinks Coleman (died October 20, 2000) was an American college sports coach. She was the first head coach of the women's basketball team at Louisiana State University (LSU) from 1975 to 1979. Coleman led the Lady Tigers (then the BenGals) to a 91–32 record before resigning 15 games into the 1978–1979 season. She was also the first head coach of the volleyball team from 1974 to 1976. Following the 1976 volleyball season, she was released from her duties as volleyball coach (finishing with a record of 75–22) and allowed to concentrate solely on basketball. She was succeeded as head volleyball coach by Gerry Owens. Throughout her tenure, however, she was required to teach five physical education classes in addition to her coaching duties.

Coleman led the Lady Tigers to a #11 final AP ranking in the 1976–1977 season and to a #10 final AP ranking in the 1977–1978 season. Her teams went to three Association of Intercollegiate Athletics for Women (AIAW) Tournaments, won a state title in 1978, and earned a regional crown in 1977.

In the 1977 AIAW National Tournament in Minneapolis, Minnesota, Coleman's LSU team defeated Western Michigan (91-53), Baylor (71-64), and Immaculata College (74-68), before falling to Margaret Wade's #1 ranked Delta State team in the national championship game by a score of 68-55.

Prior to becoming the first women's basketball head coach at LSU, Coleman was the head girls' basketball coach at Monterey High School in Monterey, Louisiana, where she led her team to the 1971 Class B Final Four.

Coleman died in Baton Rouge, Louisiana on October 20, 2000, from cancer. The LSU Lady Tigers' team locker room was named after her. The Jinks Coleman Memorial Scholarship Fund provides an annual scholarship to a female physical education major committed to instruction in physical education.

== LSU head coaching record (women's basketball) ==
Season	Team	Record	Postseason
1975–1976	LSU	17–14	AIAW Regionals
1976–1977	LSU	29–8	AIAW National Runner-Up
1977–1978	LSU	37–3	AIAW Regionals
1978–1979	LSU	8–7	Resigned Prior to End of Season
TOTAL		91–32	
