= Ruth Nelson (volleyball) =

American volleyball coach

Coaching career (HC unless noted)
- 1970–1972: George Williams
- 1974–1980: Houston
- 1981–1984: LSU
- 1989–1991: Iowa

Head coaching record
- Overall: 557–230

Ruth N. Nelson is an American former women's volleyball head coach at George Williams College, the University of Houston, Louisiana State University and the University of Iowa. She has an overall record of 557–230.

At George Williams College, Nelson compiled an overall record of 98–22 and also coached the men's tennis team while completing her Masters of Science Degree under Dr. James Coleman from 1970 to 1972. In 1974, Nelson became head coach at the University of Houston which included a 290–84 record and having the honor of coaching the late Flo Hyman, Rose Magers, Sherryl Moore and Rita Crockett until the 1980 season. In four seasons as head coach of the LSU Tigers women's volleyball team from 1981 to 1984, Nelson compiled an overall record of 128–98, including a record of 8–3 in the Southeastern Conference. The final head coaching job for Nelson was at the University of Iowa from 1989 to 1991. She finished with a 41–26 overall record and a first time appearance in the NCAA.

After coaching Iowa, Nelson moved on to become the sports marketing manager of the Special Olympics.

Nelson is currently working with youth volleyball players ages 6–18 and is the founder of BYOP® Bring Your Own Parent Program for ages 5–10 and created the GoKids Youth Sports Certification program after having developed the IAD Volleyball program in Carrollton, Texas for 2 years.
