= 2020 NCAA Division I women's volleyball tournament =

Volleyball competition

2020 NCAA women's Division I volleyball tournament
- Finals site: CHI Health Center Omaha; Omaha, Nebraska
- Champions: Kentucky (1st title)
- Runner-up: Texas (7th title match)
- Semifinalists: Washington (5th Final Four); Wisconsin (4th Final Four)
- Winning coach: Craig Skinner (1st title)
- Most outstanding player: Madison Lilley (Kentucky)
- Final Four All-Tournament Team: Alli Stumler (Kentucky); Avery Skinner (Kentucky); Brionne Butler (Texas); Logan Eggleston (Texas); Samantha Drechsel (Washington); Devyn Robinson (Wisconsin)

The 2020 NCAA Division I women's volleyball tournament began on April 14, 2021, and concluded on April 24 at the CHI Health Center Omaha in Omaha, Nebraska. The tournament field was announced on April 4, 2021. Typically held in the fall, this edition of the tournament was held in the spring due to the COVID-19 pandemic.

Kentucky beat Texas in the final to claim the first national volleyball championship not only for Kentucky, but also for its home of the Southeastern Conference.

== Tournament schedule and venues ==
2021 NCAA tournament venues

First round, second round and Regional semifinals (April 14, 15 and 18)

- CHI Health Center Omaha (Convention Center), Omaha, Nebraska (Host: University of Nebraska–Lincoln)

Regional Finals, National semifinals and championship (April 19, 22 and 24)

- CHI Health Center Omaha (Arena), Omaha, Nebraska (Host: University of Nebraska–Lincoln)

All games were played at the CHI Health Center Omaha. Twelve courts were built in the Convention Center portion of the building, 8 for practices and 4 for games. Attendance was limited to 80 people per game for the first and second rounds, mostly consisting of team family members. Additional fans were admitted as teams went home. Games moved from the convention center to the CHI Health Center Omaha arena for the regional finals, semifinals, and national championship.

== Qualifying teams ==
=== Automatic qualifiers ===
The following teams automatically qualified for the 2020 NCAA field by virtue of winning their conference's tournament. Only 30 conference champions received automatic qualifiers after the Big West Conference and Ivy League chose not to have a 2020 fall or 2021 spring season. This was the first tournament appearance for North Carolina A&T and Utah Valley.

Conference	Team	Record
ACC	Louisville	14−2
America East	UMBC	11–3
American	UCF	16−1
ASUN	Lipscomb	17−2
Atlantic 10	Dayton	13−1
Big 12	Texas	23–1
Big East	Creighton	12–3
Big Sky	Weber State	18–1
Big South	High Point	16–0
Big Ten	Wisconsin	13–0
Big West	Big West Conference season canceled	
Colonial	Towson	6–0
C-USA	Western Kentucky	21–0
Horizon	Wright State	16–1
Ivy	Ivy League season canceled	
MAAC	Rider	7–4
MAC	Bowling Green	22–1
MEAC	North Carolina A&T	11–1
Missouri Valley	Illinois State	16–5
Mountain West	UNLV	12–0
Northeast	LIU	9–5
Ohio Valley	Morehead State	16–1
Pac-12	Washington	17–3
Patriot	Army West Point	16–2
SEC	Kentucky	19–1
Southern	Samford	15–3
Southland	Texas A&M-Corpus Christi	14–4
SWAC	Jackson State	11–0
Summit	South Dakota	15–6
Sun Belt	Texas State	30–8
West Coast	BYU	16–1
WAC	Utah Valley	14–5

=== Tournament seeds ===
Top Left Regional
Seed	RPI	School	Conference	Berth type	Record
1	28	Wisconsin	Big Ten	Automatic	13–0
8	36	Florida	SEC	At-Large	19–3
9	57	Ohio State	Big Ten	At-Large	15–3
16	13	BYU	WCC	Automatic	16–1
	16	Bowling Green	MAC	Automatic	22–1
	8	Creighton	Big East	Automatic	12–3
	76	Missouri	SEC	At-Large	15–7
	25	Morehead State	OVC	Automatic	16–1
	100	Rider	MAAC	Automatic	7–4
	50	South Dakota	Summit	Automatic	15–6
	61	UCLA	Pac-12	At–Large	14–6
	6	Weber State	Big Sky	Automatic	18–1

Top Right Regional
Seed	RPI	School	Conference	Berth type	Record
3	21	Minnesota	Big Ten	At–Large	15–2
6	48	Washington	Pac-12	Automatic	17–3
11	12	Louisville	ACC	Automatic	14−2
14	75	Utah	Pac-12	At–Large	16–4
	29	Dayton	A-10	Automatic	13−1
	34	Georgia Tech	ACC	At–Large	13–4
	78	Lipscomb	ASUN	Automatic	17–2
	189	LIU	NEC	Automatic	9−5
	20	Pittsburgh	ACC	At–Large	16–4
	58	San Diego	WCC	At–Large	12–4
	59	Texas A&M-Corpus Christi	Southland	Automatic	14–4
	2	Towson	CAA	Automatic	6–0

Bottom Left Regional
Seed	RPI	School	Conference	Berth type	Record
4	3	Texas	Big 12	Automatic	23–1
5	52	Nebraska	Big Ten	At-Large	14–2
12	10	Baylor	Big 12	At-Large	19–6
13	85	Penn State	Big Ten	At-Large	9–5
	121	North Carolina A&T	MEAC	Automatic	11–1
	37	Pepperdine	WCC	At–Large	16–3
	24	Rice	C-USA	At-Large	16–5
	49	Samford	SoCon	Automatic	15–3
	33	Texas State	Sun Belt	Automatic	30–8
	46	UMBC	America East	Automatic	11–3
	42	Utah Valley	WAC	Automatic	14–5
	18	Wright State	Horizon	Automatic	16–1

Bottom Right Regional
Seed	RPI	School	Conference	Berth type	Record
2	32	Kentucky	SEC	Automatic	19–1
7	53	Purdue	Big Ten	At-Large	14–6
10	54	Oregon	Pac-12	At-Large	14–4
15	90	Washington State	Pac-12	At-Large	11–4
	1	Army West Point	Patriot	Automatic	16–2
	17	High Point	Big South	Automatic	16–0
	40	Illinois State	MVC	Automatic	16–5
	70	Jackson State	SWAC	Automatic	11–0
	15	Notre Dame	ACC	At-Large	14–3
	5	UCF	AAC	Automatic	16−1
	7	UNLV	Mountain West	Automatic	12–0
	14	Western Kentucky	C-USA	Automatic	21–0

== Bracket ==
=== Top Left Regional ===
First round CHI Health Center Omaha; Convention Center; April 14
Bowling Green	1
Weber State	3
Rider	0
UCLA	3
Missouri	3
South Dakota	0
Morehead State	3
Creighton	2

Second Round; CHI Health Center Omaha; Convention Center; April 15
1	Wisconsin	3
Weber State	0
UCLA	0
16	BYU	3
9	Ohio State	3
Missouri	0
Morehead State	0
8	Florida	3

Regional semifinals CHI Health Center Omaha; Convention Center; April 17 & 18
1	Wisconsin	3
16	BYU	0
9	Ohio State	1
8	Florida	3

Regional Finals; CHI Health Center Omaha; Arena; April 19
1	Wisconsin	3
8	Florida	2

=== Schedule ===
==== First round ====
April 14, 2021; 6:00 p.m. CDT	Bowling Green	1–3	Weber State	CHI Health Center Omaha Convention Center Court 1, Omaha, Nebraska; Attendance: 0 Referees: Pati Rolf, Kevin Wendleboe, Kendrick Paulson, Ben Goodwin
April 14, 2021; 6:00 p.m. CDT	(18–25, 25–22, 22–25, 21–25); Result Report			CHI Health Center Omaha Convention Center Court 1, Omaha, Nebraska; Attendance: 0 Referees: Pati Rolf, Kevin Wendleboe, Kendrick Paulson, Ben Goodwin

April 14, 2021; 9:30 p.m. CDT	Rider	0–3	UCLA	CHI Health Center Omaha Convention Center Court 4, Omaha, Nebraska; Attendance: 0 Referees: Margie Ray, Daphne Nelson, Ken Corum, Nathaniel Wagner
April 14, 2021; 9:30 p.m. CDT	(12–25, 8–25, 9–25); Result Report			CHI Health Center Omaha Convention Center Court 4, Omaha, Nebraska; Attendance: 0 Referees: Margie Ray, Daphne Nelson, Ken Corum, Nathaniel Wagner

April 14, 2021; 11:00 a.m. CDT	Missouri	3–0	South Dakota	CHI Health Center Omaha Convention Center Court 1, Omaha, Nebraska; Attendance: 0 Referees: Chad Klunck, Paul Albright, Ben Goodwin, Thomas Berg
April 14, 2021; 11:00 a.m. CDT	(25–21, 25–17, 25–15); Result Report			CHI Health Center Omaha Convention Center Court 1, Omaha, Nebraska; Attendance: 0 Referees: Chad Klunck, Paul Albright, Ben Goodwin, Thomas Berg

April 14, 2021; 2:30 p.m. CDT	Morehead State	3–2	Creighton	CHI Health Center Omaha Convention Center Court 4, Omaha, Nebraska; Attendance: 0 Referees: Lena Gustafason, Jim Kuziela, Anthony Huber, Ken Corum
April 14, 2021; 2:30 p.m. CDT	(22–25, 25–23, 25–23, 14–25, 15–13); Result Report			CHI Health Center Omaha Convention Center Court 4, Omaha, Nebraska; Attendance: 0 Referees: Lena Gustafason, Jim Kuziela, Anthony Huber, Ken Corum

==== Second round ====
April 15, 2021; 6:00 p.m. CDT	(1) Wisconsin	3–0	Weber State	CHI Health Center Omaha Convention Center Court 1, Omaha, Nebraska; Attendance: 0 Referees: Brian Hemelgarn, Mike Hamilton, Thomas Berg, Craig Wiedel
April 15, 2021; 6:00 p.m. CDT	(25–17, 25–19, 25–15); Result Report			CHI Health Center Omaha Convention Center Court 1, Omaha, Nebraska; Attendance: 0 Referees: Brian Hemelgarn, Mike Hamilton, Thomas Berg, Craig Wiedel

April 15, 2021; 9:30 p.m. CDT	UCLA	0–3	(16) BYU	CHI Health Center Omaha Convention Center Court 4, Omaha, Nebraska; Attendance: 0 Referees: Christina Fiebich, Kevin Wendleboe, Ken Corum, Henry Chen
April 15, 2021; 9:30 p.m. CDT	(24–26, 29–31, 17–25); Result Report			CHI Health Center Omaha Convention Center Court 4, Omaha, Nebraska; Attendance: 0 Referees: Christina Fiebich, Kevin Wendleboe, Ken Corum, Henry Chen

April 15, 2021; 11:00 a.m. CDT	(9) Ohio State	3–0	Missouri	CHI Health Center Omaha Convention Center Court 1, Omaha, Nebraska; Attendance: 0 Referees: Michelle Prater, Jim Kuziela, Craig Wiedel, Kendrick Paulson
April 15, 2021; 11:00 a.m. CDT	(25–17, 25–20, 25–21); Result Report			CHI Health Center Omaha Convention Center Court 1, Omaha, Nebraska; Attendance: 0 Referees: Michelle Prater, Jim Kuziela, Craig Wiedel, Kendrick Paulson

April 15, 2021; 2:30 p.m. CDT	Morehead State	0–3	(8) Florida	CHI Health Center Omaha Convention Center Court 4, Omaha, Nebraska; Attendance: 0 Referees: Maile Jewkes, Paul Albright, Henry Chem, Ken Corum
April 15, 2021; 2:30 p.m. CDT	(14–25, 19–25, 19–25); Result Report			CHI Health Center Omaha Convention Center Court 4, Omaha, Nebraska; Attendance: 0 Referees: Maile Jewkes, Paul Albright, Henry Chem, Ken Corum

==== Regional semifinals ====
Due to BYU's "No Sunday Play" policy, the BYU regional semifinal was moved to April 17.

April 17, 2021; 7:00 p.m. CDT	(1) Wisconsin	3–0	(16) BYU	CHI Health Center Omaha Convention Center Court 3, Omaha, Nebraska; Attendance: 0 Referees: Michelle Prater, Kaili Kimura, Ben Goodwin, Dan Swensen
April 17, 2021; 7:00 p.m. CDT	(25–20, 25–17, 25–12); Result Report			CHI Health Center Omaha Convention Center Court 3, Omaha, Nebraska; Attendance: 0 Referees: Michelle Prater, Kaili Kimura, Ben Goodwin, Dan Swensen

April 18, 2021; 6:30 p.m. CDT	(9) Ohio State	1–3	(8) Florida	CHI Health Center Omaha Convention Center Court 1, Omaha, Nebraska; Attendance: 0 Referees: Robyn Courchane, Julie Voeck, Kendrick Paulson, Bev Michelson
April 18, 2021; 6:30 p.m. CDT	(20–25, 24–26, 25–23, 16–25); Result Report			CHI Health Center Omaha Convention Center Court 1, Omaha, Nebraska; Attendance: 0 Referees: Robyn Courchane, Julie Voeck, Kendrick Paulson, Bev Michelson

==== Regional final ====
April 19, 2021; 5:30 p.m. CDT	(1) Wisconsin	3–2	(8) Florida	CHI Health Center Omaha Arena, Omaha, Nebraska; Attendance: 0 Referees: Margie Ray, Joe Gustafson, Kyp Harasymowycz, Ken Corum
April 19, 2021; 5:30 p.m. CDT	(30–28, 18–25, 25–22, 18–25, 15–12); Result Report			CHI Health Center Omaha Arena, Omaha, Nebraska; Attendance: 0 Referees: Margie Ray, Joe Gustafson, Kyp Harasymowycz, Ken Corum

=== Bottom Left Regional ===
First round CHI Health Center Omaha; Convention Center; April 14
Texas State	3
Utah Valley	1
UMBC	0
Pepperdine	3
Rice (Note: Match declared no contest due to COVID-19 protocols with Rice. North Carolina A&T advances in the tournament.)
North Carolina A&T	WO
Samford	0
Wright State	3

Second Round; CHI Health Center Omaha; Convention Center; April 15
5	Nebraska	3
Texas State	0
Pepperdine	2
12	Baylor	3
13	Penn State	3
North Carolina A&T	0
Wright State	0
4	Texas	3

Regional semifinals CHI Health Center Omaha; Convention Center; April 18
5	Nebraska	3
12	Baylor	0
13	Penn State	1
4	Texas	3

Regional Finals; CHI Health Center Omaha; Arena; April 19
5	Nebraska	1
4	Texas	3

=== Schedule ===
==== First round ====
April 14, 2021; 2:30 p.m. CDT	Texas State	3–1	Utah Valley	CHI Health Center Omaha Convention Center Court 1, Omaha, Nebraska; Attendance: 0 Referees: Devonie McLarty, Joe Gustafson, Henry Chen, Jeff Krause
April 14, 2021; 2:30 p.m. CDT	(25–21, 25–16, 20–25, 25–22); Result Report			CHI Health Center Omaha Convention Center Court 1, Omaha, Nebraska; Attendance: 0 Referees: Devonie McLarty, Joe Gustafson, Henry Chen, Jeff Krause

April 14, 2021; 11:00 a.m. CDT	UMBC	0–3	Pepperdine	CHI Health Center Omaha Convention Center Court 4, Omaha, Nebraska; Attendance: 50; Referees: Bill Thornburgh, Darin Clark, Mike Behrens, Kyp Harasymowycz
April 14, 2021; 11:00 a.m. CDT	(7–25, 22–25, 24–26); Result Report			CHI Health Center Omaha Convention Center Court 4, Omaha, Nebraska; Attendance: 50; Referees: Bill Thornburgh, Darin Clark, Mike Behrens, Kyp Harasymowycz

April 14, 2021; 9:30 pm. CDT	Rice	v	North Carolina A&T	CHI Health Center Omaha Convention Center Court 1, Omaha, Nebraska
April 14, 2021; 9:30 pm. CDT	View page			CHI Health Center Omaha Convention Center Court 1, Omaha, Nebraska
April 14, 2021; 9:30 pm. CDT	North Carolina A&T advances due to COVID-19 protocols with Rice			CHI Health Center Omaha Convention Center Court 1, Omaha, Nebraska

April 14, 2021; 6:00 p.m. CDT	Samford	0–3	Wright State	CHI Health Center Omaha Convention Center Court 4, Omaha, Nebraska; Attendance: 0 Referees: Jung Park, Brett Myres, Kyp Harasymowycz, Mike Behrens
April 14, 2021; 6:00 p.m. CDT	(20–25, 12–25, 15–25); Result Report			CHI Health Center Omaha Convention Center Court 4, Omaha, Nebraska; Attendance: 0 Referees: Jung Park, Brett Myres, Kyp Harasymowycz, Mike Behrens

==== Second round ====
April 15, 2021; 2:30 p.m. CDT	(5) Nebraska	3–0	Texas State	CHI Health Center Omaha Convention Center Court 1, Omaha, Nebraska; Attendance: 0 Referees: Paula Martin, Julie Voeck, Nathan Wagner, Jeff Krause
April 15, 2021; 2:30 p.m. CDT	(25–18, 25–17, 25–20); Result Report			CHI Health Center Omaha Convention Center Court 1, Omaha, Nebraska; Attendance: 0 Referees: Paula Martin, Julie Voeck, Nathan Wagner, Jeff Krause

April 15, 2021; 11:00 a.m. CDT	Pepperdine	2–3	(12) Baylor	CHI Health Center Omaha Convention Center Court 4, Omaha, Nebraska; Attendance: 0 Referees: Bill ThornBurgh, Daphne Nelson, Ben Goodwin, Kyp Harasymowycz
April 15, 2021; 11:00 a.m. CDT	(21–25, 25–22, 25–17, 25–27, 10–15); Result Report			CHI Health Center Omaha Convention Center Court 4, Omaha, Nebraska; Attendance: 0 Referees: Bill ThornBurgh, Daphne Nelson, Ben Goodwin, Kyp Harasymowycz

April 15, 2021; 9:30 p.m. CDT	(13) Penn State	3–0	North Carolina A&T	CHI Health Center Omaha Convention Center Court 1, Omaha, Nebraska; Attendance: 0 Referees: Suzanne Lowry, Donna Hess, Jeff Krause, Nathan Wagner
April 15, 2021; 9:30 p.m. CDT	(25–11, 25–19, 25–15)			CHI Health Center Omaha Convention Center Court 1, Omaha, Nebraska; Attendance: 0 Referees: Suzanne Lowry, Donna Hess, Jeff Krause, Nathan Wagner

April 15, 2021; 6:00 p.m. CDT	Wright State	0–3	(4) Texas	CHI Health Center Omaha Convention Center Court 4, Omaha, Nebraska; Attendance: 0 Referees: Pati Rolf, Sergio Gonzalez, Kyp Harasymowycz, Anthony Huber
April 15, 2021; 6:00 p.m. CDT	(12–25, 16–25, 16–25); Result Report			CHI Health Center Omaha Convention Center Court 4, Omaha, Nebraska; Attendance: 0 Referees: Pati Rolf, Sergio Gonzalez, Kyp Harasymowycz, Anthony Huber

==== Regional semifinals ====
April 18, 2021; 1:30 p.m. CDT	(5) Nebraska	3–0	(12) Baylor	CHI Health Center Omaha Convention Center Court 1, Omaha, Nebraska; Attendance: 0 Referees: Devonie McLarty, Joe Gustafson, Henry Chen, Jeff Krause
April 18, 2021; 1:30 p.m. CDT	(25–21, 25–17, 25–19); Result Report			CHI Health Center Omaha Convention Center Court 1, Omaha, Nebraska; Attendance: 0 Referees: Devonie McLarty, Joe Gustafson, Henry Chen, Jeff Krause

April 18, 2021; 4:00 p.m. CDT	(13) Penn State	1–3	(4) Texas	CHI Health Center Omaha Convention Center Court 1, Omaha, Nebraska; Attendance: 0 Referees: Margie Ray, Kevin Wendelboe, Sarah Myres, Craig Wiedel
April 18, 2021; 4:00 p.m. CDT	(25–23, 18–25, 28–30, 17–25); Result Report			CHI Health Center Omaha Convention Center Court 1, Omaha, Nebraska; Attendance: 0 Referees: Margie Ray, Kevin Wendelboe, Sarah Myres, Craig Wiedel

==== Regional final ====
April 19, 2021; 1:30 p.m. CDT	(5) Nebraska	1–3	(4) Texas	CHI Health Center Omaha Arena, Omaha, Nebraska; Attendance: 4,154; Referees: Ryan MacDowell, Daphne Nelson, Amber Nicholson, Dan Swensen
April 19, 2021; 1:30 p.m. CDT	(22–25, 25–19, 15–25, 21–25); Preview Report			CHI Health Center Omaha Arena, Omaha, Nebraska; Attendance: 4,154; Referees: Ryan MacDowell, Daphne Nelson, Amber Nicholson, Dan Swensen

=== Top Right Regional ===
First round CHI Health Center Omaha; Convention Center; April 14
Georgia Tech	3
Lipscomb	1
LIU	0
Pittsburgh	3
San Diego	3
Texas A&M-Corpus Christi	0
Towson	0
Dayton	3

Second Round; CHI Health Center Omaha; Convention Center; April 15
3	Minnesota	3
Georgia Tech	0
Pittsburgh	3
14	Utah	0
11	Louisville	3
San Diego	1
Dayton	2
6	Washington	3

Regional semifinals CHI Health Center Omaha; Convention Center; April 18
3	Minnesota	2
Pittsburgh	3
11	Louisville	2
6	Washington	3

Regional Finals; CHI Health Center Omaha; Arena; April 19
Pittsburgh	2
6	Washington	3

=== Schedule ===
==== First round ====
April 14, 2021; 6:00 p.m. CDT	Georgia Tech	3–1	Lipscomb	CHI Health Center Omaha Convention Center Court 2, Omaha, Nebraska; Attendance: 0 Referees: Brian Hemelgarn, Stephen Sheperd, Bev Michelson, Tracy LeVine
April 14, 2021; 6:00 p.m. CDT	(25–21, 16–25, 25–21, 25–19); Result Report			CHI Health Center Omaha Convention Center Court 2, Omaha, Nebraska; Attendance: 0 Referees: Brian Hemelgarn, Stephen Sheperd, Bev Michelson, Tracy LeVine

April 14, 2021; 9:30 p.m. CDT	LIU	0–3	Pittsburgh	CHI Health Center Omaha Convention Center Court 3, Omaha, Nebraska; Attendance: 0 Referees: Paula Martin, Kaili Kimura, Amber Nicholson, Rena Smith
April 14, 2021; 9:30 p.m. CDT	(24–26, 11–25, 10–25); Result Report			CHI Health Center Omaha Convention Center Court 3, Omaha, Nebraska; Attendance: 0 Referees: Paula Martin, Kaili Kimura, Amber Nicholson, Rena Smith

April 14, 2021; 11:00 a.m. CDT	San Diego	3–0	Texas A&M-Corpus Christi	CHI Health Center Omaha Convention Center Court 2, Omaha, Nebraska; Attendance: 0 Referees: Robyn Courchene, April Fricke, Lisa Kresha, Bev Michelson
April 14, 2021; 11:00 a.m. CDT	(25–13, 25–15, 25–18); Result Report			CHI Health Center Omaha Convention Center Court 2, Omaha, Nebraska; Attendance: 0 Referees: Robyn Courchene, April Fricke, Lisa Kresha, Bev Michelson

April 14, 2021; 2:30 p.m. CDT	Towson	0–3	Dayton	CHI Health Center Omaha Convention Center Court 3, Omaha, Nebraska; Attendance: 0 Referees: Suzanne Lowry, Brad Aaberg, Rena Smith, Amber Nicholson
April 14, 2021; 2:30 p.m. CDT	(25–15, 25–16, 25–16); Result Report			CHI Health Center Omaha Convention Center Court 3, Omaha, Nebraska; Attendance: 0 Referees: Suzanne Lowry, Brad Aaberg, Rena Smith, Amber Nicholson

==== Second round ====
April 15, 2021; 6:00 p.m. CDT	(3) Minnesota	3–0	Georgia Tech	CHI Health Center Omaha Convention Center Court 2, Omaha, Nebraska; Attendance: 0 Referees: Chad Klunck, Stephen Shepherd, Bev Michelson, Tyrone Toloy
April 15, 2021; 6:00 p.m. CDT	(25–19, 25–21, 25–18); Result Report			CHI Health Center Omaha Convention Center Court 2, Omaha, Nebraska; Attendance: 0 Referees: Chad Klunck, Stephen Shepherd, Bev Michelson, Tyrone Toloy

April 15, 2021; 9:30 p.m. CDT	Pittsburgh	3–0	(14) Utah	CHI Health Center Omaha Convention Center Court 3, Omaha, Nebraska; Attendance: 0 Referees: Devonie McLarty, Brad Aaberg, Amber Nicholson, Sarah Myres
April 15, 2021; 9:30 p.m. CDT	(25–16, 25–18, 25–19); Result Report			CHI Health Center Omaha Convention Center Court 3, Omaha, Nebraska; Attendance: 0 Referees: Devonie McLarty, Brad Aaberg, Amber Nicholson, Sarah Myres

April 15, 2021; 11:00 a.m. CDT	(11) Louisville	3–1	San Diego	CHI Health Center Omaha Convention Center Court 2, Omaha, Nebraska; Attendance: 0 Referees: Lena Gustafson, Darin Clark, Tyrone Toloy, Lisa Kresha
April 15, 2021; 11:00 a.m. CDT	(14–25, 25–23, 25–17, 29–27); Result Report			CHI Health Center Omaha Convention Center Court 2, Omaha, Nebraska; Attendance: 0 Referees: Lena Gustafson, Darin Clark, Tyrone Toloy, Lisa Kresha

April 15, 2021; 2:30 p.m. CDT	Dayton	2–3	(6) Washington	CHI Health Center Omaha Convention Center Court 3, Omaha, Nebraska; Attendance: 0 Referees: Ryan Mac Dowell, April Fricke, Sarah Meyer, Amber Nicholson
April 15, 2021; 2:30 p.m. CDT	(18–25, 23–25, 26–24, 25–21, 11–15); Result Report			CHI Health Center Omaha Convention Center Court 3, Omaha, Nebraska; Attendance: 0 Referees: Ryan Mac Dowell, April Fricke, Sarah Meyer, Amber Nicholson

==== Regional semifinals ====
April 18, 2021; 12:00 p.m. CDT	(3) Minnesota	2–3	Pittsburgh	CHI Health Center Omaha Convention Center Court 3, Omaha, Nebraska; Attendance: 0 Referees: Pati Rolf, Brett Myres, Anthony Huber, Ken Corum
April 18, 2021; 12:00 p.m. CDT	(25–21, 23–25, 25–20, 21–25, 11–15); Result Report			CHI Health Center Omaha Convention Center Court 3, Omaha, Nebraska; Attendance: 0 Referees: Pati Rolf, Brett Myres, Anthony Huber, Ken Corum

April 18, 2021; 3:41 p.m. CDT	(11) Louisville	2–3	(6) Washington	CHI Health Center Omaha Convention Center Court 3, Omaha, Nebraska; Attendance: 0 Referees: Paula Martin, Stephen Shepherd, Rena Smith, Amber Nicholson
April 18, 2021; 3:41 p.m. CDT	(23–25, 25–21, 25–21, 14–25, 13–15); Result Report			CHI Health Center Omaha Convention Center Court 3, Omaha, Nebraska; Attendance: 0 Referees: Paula Martin, Stephen Shepherd, Rena Smith, Amber Nicholson

==== Regional final ====
April 19, 2021; 11:00 a.m. CDT	Pittsburgh	2–3	(6) Washington	CHI Health Center Omaha Arena, Omaha, Nebraska; Attendance: 0 Referees: Michelle Prater, Julie Voeck, Ben Goodwin, Tyrone Toloy
April 19, 2021; 11:00 a.m. CDT	(25–20, 25–21, 16–25, 24–26, 9–15); Result Report			CHI Health Center Omaha Arena, Omaha, Nebraska; Attendance: 0 Referees: Michelle Prater, Julie Voeck, Ben Goodwin, Tyrone Toloy

=== Bottom Right Regional ===
First round CHI Health Center Omaha; Convention Center; April 14
UCF	2
High Point	3
Army West Point	1
Notre Dame	3
Western Kentucky	3
Jackson State	0
Illinois State	1
UNLV	3

Second Round; CHI Health Center Omaha; Convention Center; April 15
7	Purdue	3
High Point	0
Notre Dame	0
10	Oregon	3
15	Washington State	2
Western Kentucky	3
UNLV	0
2	Kentucky	3

Regional semifinals CHI Health Center Omaha; Convention Center; April 18
7	Purdue	3
10	Oregon	1
Western Kentucky	0
2	Kentucky	3

Regional Finals; CHI Health Center Omaha; Arena; April 19
7	Purdue	0
2	Kentucky	3

=== Schedule ===
==== First round ====
April 14, 2021; 2:30 p.m. CDT	UCF	2–3	High Point	CHI Health Center Omaha Convention Center Court 2, Omaha, Nebraska; Attendance: 0 Referees: Christina Fiebich, Mike Hamilton, Sarah Myres, Dan Swenson
April 14, 2021; 2:30 p.m. CDT	(22–25, 25–19, 25–21, 23–25, 11–15); Result Report			CHI Health Center Omaha Convention Center Court 2, Omaha, Nebraska; Attendance: 0 Referees: Christina Fiebich, Mike Hamilton, Sarah Myres, Dan Swenson

April 14, 2021; 11:00 a.m. CDT	Army West Point	1–3	Notre Dame	CHI Health Center Omaha Convention Center Court 3, Omaha, Nebraska; Attendance: 0 Referees: Bill Stanley, Sergio Gonzalez, Tyrone Toloy, Deanna Schneyer
April 14, 2021; 11:00 a.m. CDT	(25–23, 22–25, 17–25, 11–25); Result Report			CHI Health Center Omaha Convention Center Court 3, Omaha, Nebraska; Attendance: 0 Referees: Bill Stanley, Sergio Gonzalez, Tyrone Toloy, Deanna Schneyer

April 14, 2021; 9:30 p.m. CDT	Western Kentucky	3–0	Jackson State	CHI Health Center Omaha Convention Center Court 2, Omaha, Nebraska; Attendance: 0 Referees: Maile Jewkes, Ron Pelham, Dan Swenson, Sarah Myres
April 14, 2021; 9:30 p.m. CDT	(25–12, 25–16, 25–12); Result Report			CHI Health Center Omaha Convention Center Court 2, Omaha, Nebraska; Attendance: 0 Referees: Maile Jewkes, Ron Pelham, Dan Swenson, Sarah Myres

April 14, 2021; 6:00 p.m. CDT	Illinois State	1–3	UNLV	CHI Health Center Omaha Convention Center Court 3, Omaha, Nebraska; Attendance: 0 Referees: Michelle Prater, Julie Voeck, Craig Wiedel, Tyrone Toloy
April 14, 2021; 6:00 p.m. CDT	(21–25, 21–25, 25–20, 17–25); Result Report			CHI Health Center Omaha Convention Center Court 3, Omaha, Nebraska; Attendance: 0 Referees: Michelle Prater, Julie Voeck, Craig Wiedel, Tyrone Toloy

==== Second round ====
April 15, 2021; 2:30 p.m. CDT	(7) Purdue	3–0	High Point	CHI Health Center Omaha Convention Center Court 2, Omaha, Nebraska; Attendance: 0 Referees: Margie Ray, Joe Gustafson, Rena Smith, Dan Swensen
April 15, 2021; 2:30 p.m. CDT	(26–24, 25–18, 25–19); Result Report			CHI Health Center Omaha Convention Center Court 2, Omaha, Nebraska; Attendance: 0 Referees: Margie Ray, Joe Gustafson, Rena Smith, Dan Swensen

April 15, 2021; 11:00 a.m. CDT	Notre Dame	0–3	(10) Oregon	CHI Health Center Omaha Convention Center Court 3, Omaha, Nebraska; Attendance: 0 Referees: Robyn Courchene, Brett Myres, Bev Michelson, Deanna Schneyer
April 15, 2021; 11:00 a.m. CDT	(17–25, 22–25, 13–25); Result Report			CHI Health Center Omaha Convention Center Court 3, Omaha, Nebraska; Attendance: 0 Referees: Robyn Courchene, Brett Myres, Bev Michelson, Deanna Schneyer

April 15, 2021; 9:30 p.m. CDT	(15) Washington State	2–3	Western Kentucky	CHI Health Center Omaha Convention Center Court 2, Omaha, Nebraska; Attendance: 0 Referees: Bill Stanley, Kaili Kimura, Dan Swensen, Rena Smith
April 15, 2021; 9:30 p.m. CDT	(22–25, 20–25, 25–21, 25–17, 10–15); Result Report			CHI Health Center Omaha Convention Center Court 2, Omaha, Nebraska; Attendance: 0 Referees: Bill Stanley, Kaili Kimura, Dan Swensen, Rena Smith

April 15, 2021; 6:00 p.m. CDT	UNLV	0–3	(2) Kentucky	CHI Health Center Omaha Convention Center Court 3, Omaha, Nebraska; Attendance: 0 Referees: Jung Park, Ron Pelham, Ben Goodwin, Tracy LeVine
April 15, 2021; 6:00 p.m. CDT	(16–25, 19–25, 18–25); Result Report			CHI Health Center Omaha Convention Center Court 3, Omaha, Nebraska; Attendance: 0 Referees: Jung Park, Ron Pelham, Ben Goodwin, Tracy LeVine

==== Regional semifinals ====
April 18, 2021; 7:30 p.m. CDT	(7) Purdue	3–1	(10) Oregon	CHI Health Center Omaha Convention Center Court 3, Omaha, Nebraska; Attendance: 0 Referees: Ryan MacDowell, Sergio Gonzalez, Mike Behrens, Kyp Harasymowycz
April 18, 2021; 7:30 p.m. CDT	(25–17, 25–16, 22–25, 26–24); Result Report			CHI Health Center Omaha Convention Center Court 3, Omaha, Nebraska; Attendance: 0 Referees: Ryan MacDowell, Sergio Gonzalez, Mike Behrens, Kyp Harasymowycz

April 18, 2021; 9:00 p.m. CDT	Western Kentucky	0–3	(2) Kentucky	CHI Health Center Omaha Convention Center Court 1, Omaha, Nebraska; Attendance: 0 Referees: Suzanne Lowry, Daphne Nelson, Tyrone Toloy, Nathaniel Wagner
April 18, 2021; 9:00 p.m. CDT	(20–25, 16–25, 10–25); Result Report			CHI Health Center Omaha Convention Center Court 1, Omaha, Nebraska; Attendance: 0 Referees: Suzanne Lowry, Daphne Nelson, Tyrone Toloy, Nathaniel Wagner

==== Regional final ====
April 19, 2021; 8:00 p.m. CDT	(7) Purdue	0–3	(2) Kentucky	CHI Health Center Omaha Arena, Omaha, Nebraska; Attendance: 4,520; Referees: Devonie McLarty, Kaili Kimura, Henry Chen, Bev Michelson
April 19, 2021; 8:00 p.m. CDT	(23–25, 20–25, 16–25); Result Report			CHI Health Center Omaha Arena, Omaha, Nebraska; Attendance: 4,520; Referees: Devonie McLarty, Kaili Kimura, Henry Chen, Bev Michelson

== Final four ==
National semifinals CHI Health Center Omaha; Arena; April 22
1	Wisconsin	0
4	Texas	3
6	Washington	1
2	Kentucky	3

National championship CHI Health Center Omaha; Arena; April 24
4	Texas	1
2	Kentucky	3

=== National semifinals ===
April 22, 2021; 8:30 p.m. CDT	(1) Wisconsin	0–3	(4) Texas	CHI Health Center Omaha Arena, Omaha, Nebraska; Attendance: 4,948; Referees: Devonie McLarty, Kaili Kimura, Bev Michelson, Henry Chen
April 22, 2021; 8:30 p.m. CDT	(24–26, 19–25, 23–25); Result Report			CHI Health Center Omaha Arena, Omaha, Nebraska; Attendance: 4,948; Referees: Devonie McLarty, Kaili Kimura, Bev Michelson, Henry Chen

April 22, 2021; 6:00 p.m. CDT	(6) Washington	1–3	(2) Kentucky	CHI Health Center Omaha Arena, Omaha, Nebraska; Attendance: 4,948; Referees: Ryan MacDowell, Julie Voeck, Tyrone Toloy, Ben Goodwin
April 22, 2021; 6:00 p.m. CDT	(18–25, 25–23, 23–25, 17–25); Result Report			CHI Health Center Omaha Arena, Omaha, Nebraska; Attendance: 4,948; Referees: Ryan MacDowell, Julie Voeck, Tyrone Toloy, Ben Goodwin

=== National championship ===
April 24, 2021; 7:00 p.m. CDT	(4) Texas	1–3	(2) Kentucky	CHI Health Center Omaha Arena, Omaha, Nebraska; Referees: Devonie McLarty, Kaili Kimura, Ben Goodwin, Tyrone Toloy
April 24, 2021; 7:00 p.m. CDT	(25–20, 18–25, 23–25, 22–25); Result Report			CHI Health Center Omaha Arena, Omaha, Nebraska; Referees: Devonie McLarty, Kaili Kimura, Ben Goodwin, Tyrone Toloy

==== Final Four All-Tournament Team ====
- Madison Lilley – Kentucky (Most Outstanding Player)
- Alli Stumler – Kentucky
- Avery Skinner – Kentucky
- Brionne Butler – Texas
- Logan Eggleston – Texas
- Samantha Drechsel – Washington
- Devyn Robinson – Wisconsin

== Media coverage ==
For the first time ever all matches will air on the ESPN Family of networks. Rounds 1 and 2 will stream on ESPN3. Initially ESPN didn't plan to provide commentators for these rounds. After criticism from fans and coaches they changed course and announced they would provide commentary for the first two rounds. The regional semifinals will have select matches on ESPN2 and ESPNU with the remainder on ESPN3. All regional finals will air on ESPN2 or ESPNU, ESPN will carry the semifinals, and ESPN2 will carry the national championship.

First & Second Rounds

- Mike Monaco (Court 1 Afternoon)
- Courtney Lyle (Court 1 Evening)
- Matt Schick (Court 2 Afternoon)
- Sam Gore (Court 2 Evening)
- Sam Ravech (Court 3 Wed. Afternoon)
- Eric Frede (Court 3 Thurs. Afternoon)
- Tyler Denning (Court 3 Evening)
- Alex Perlman (Court 4 Afternoon)
- Paul Sunderland (Court 4 Evening)

Regional semifinals & Regional Finals

- Eric Frede and Katie George (Court 1 Sun. Afternoon)
- Courtney Lyle and Missy Whittemore (Court 3 Sun. Afternoon, Mon. Afternoon)
- Paul Sunderland and Salima Rockwell (Court 1 Sun. Evening, Mon. Evening)
- Tyler Denning and Jenny Hazelwood (Sat., Court 3 Sun. Evening)

Semifinals & national championship

- Paul Sunderland, Salima Rockwell, and Holly Rowe

== Records by Conference ==
Conference	Bids	Record	Win %	R32	S16	E8	F4	CM	NC
SEC	3	8–2	.800	3	2	2	1	1	1
Big 12	2	5–2	.714	2	2	1	1	1	–
Big Ten	6	10–6	.625	6	6	3	1	–	–
Pac-12	5	5–5	.500	5	2	1	1	–	–
ACC	4	7–4	.636	4	2	1	–	–	–
West Coast	3	3–3	.500	3	1	–	–	–	–
C-USA	2	2–2	.500	1	1	–	–	–	–
Atlantic 10	1	1–1	.500	1	–	–	–	–	–
Big Sky	1	1–1	.500	1	–	–	–	–	–
Big South	1	1–1	.500	1	–	–	–	–	–
Horizon	1	1–1	.500	1	–	–	–	–	–
MEAC	1	1–1	.500	1	–	–	–	–	–
Mountain West	1	1–1	.500	1	–	–	–	–	–
Ohio Valley	1	1–1	.500	1	–	–	–	–	–
Sun Belt	1	1–1	.500	1	–	–	–	–	–
12 Others	12	0–12	.000	–	–	–	–	–	–

- The R32, S16, E8, F4, CM, and NC columns indicate how many teams from each conference were in the Round of 32 (second round), Round of 16 (third round), quarterfinals (Elite Eight), semi-finals (Final Four), championship match, and national champion, respectively.
- The following conferences failed to place a team into the round of 32: America East, Big East, Colonial, MAAC, Missouri Valley, Northeast, Patriot, Southern, Southland, SWAC, Summit, and the WAC. The conference's records have been consolidated in the other row.
