= 1990 NCAA Division I women's volleyball tournament =

Volleyball competition

1990 NCAA women's Division I volleyball tournament
- 1990 NCAA Final Four logo
- Champions: UCLA (2nd NCAA (5th national) title)
- Runner-up: Pacific (3rd NCAA (4th national) title match)
- Semifinalists: LSU (1st Final Four); Nebraska (3rd Final Four)
- Winning coach: Andy Banachowski (2nd title)
- Final Four All-Tournament Team: Natalie Williams (UCLA); Marissa Hatchett (UCLA); Jenny Evans (UCLA); Holly McPeak (UCLA); Krissy Fifer (Pacific); Monique Adams (LSU)

The 1990 NCAA Division I women's volleyball tournament began with 32 teams and ended on December 15, 1990, when UCLA defeated Pacific 3 games to 0 in the NCAA championship match.

UCLA won the program's second NCAA title in women's volleyball by defeating Pacific 15-9, 15-12, 15-7. UCLA was led by Natalie Williams and Marissa Hatchett who had 12 kills a piece. The Bruins finished the 1990 season 36-1.

The 1990 Final Four was held at the Cole Field House in College Park, Maryland.

== Records ==
Seed	School	Conference	Berth Type	Record
	BYU	WAC	At-large	26-7
	Florida State	Metro	Automatic	25-9
	Gonzaga	West Coast	At-large	25-6
	Hawaii	Big West	Automatic	27-5
	Idaho State	Big Sky	Automatic	22-9
	Illinois	Big Ten	At-large	21-11
	Kentucky	SEC	At-large	21-11
	Long Beach State	Big West	At-large	26-8
	Louisville	Metro	At-large	31-6
	LSU	SEC	Automatic	31-6
	Maryland	ACC	Automatic	22-11
	Miami (OH)	Mid-American	Automatic	25-5
	Montana	Big Sky	At-large	24-6
	Nebraska	Big Eight	Automatic	29-2
	New Mexico	WAC	Automatic	21-6
	Ohio State	Big Ten	At-large	23-7
	Pacific	Big West	At-large	26-6
	Penn State	Atlantic 10	Automatic	42-0
	Pepperdine	West Coast	Automatic	25-5
	Pittsburgh	Big East	Automatic	31-5
	Purdue	Big Ten	At-large	21-10
	San Diego State	WAC	At-large	23-11
	San Jose State	Big West	At-large	21-7
	Southwest Missouri State	Missouri Valley	Automatic	24-7
	Stanford	Pac-10	At-large	25-3
	Texas	Southwest	Automatic	29-3
	Texas Tech	Southwest	At-large	29-2
	Texas-Arlington	Southland	Automatic	18-18
	UC Santa Barbara	Big West	At-large	21-9
	UCLA	Pac-12	Automatic	31-1
	Wisconsin	Big Ten	Automatic	28-7
	Wyoming	WAC	At-large	19-9

== Brackets ==
=== West regional ===
First round
UCLA	3
Gonzaga	0
Pepperdine	0
New Mexico	3
BYU	1
San Diego State	3
Wyoming	0
Stanford	3

Regional semifinal
UCLA	3
New Mexico	2
San Diego State	1
Stanford	3

Regional Final
UCLA	3
Stanford	0

=== South regional ===
First round
Texas Tech	3
UT Arlington	0
LSU	3
Louisville	0
Kentucky	3
Florida State	1
Maryland	0
Texas	3

Regional semifinal
Texas Tech	0
LSU	3
Kentucky	0
Texas	3

Regional Final
LSU	3
Texas	2

=== Mideast regional ===
First round
Penn State	3
Purdue	0
Illinois	0
Wisconsin	3
Ohio State	0
Pittsburgh	3
Miami (Oh.)	0
Nebraska	3

Regional semifinal
Penn State	3
Wisconsin	0
Pittsburgh	0
Nebraska	3

Regional Final
Penn State	1
Nebraska	3

=== Northwest regional ===
First round
Hawaiʻi	3
SW Missouri State	0
San Jose State	0
Long Beach State	3
UCSB	3
Idaho State	0
Montana	0
Pacific	3

Regional semifinal
Hawaiʻi	1
Long Beach State	3
UCSB	0
Pacific	3

Regional Final
Long Beach State	0
Pacific	3

== Final Four - Cole Field House, College Park, Maryland ==
National semifinals
UCLA	3
LSU	0
Nebraska	1
Pacific	3

National championship
UCLA	3
Pacific	0

== NCAA tournament records ==
There is one NCAA tournament record that was set in the 1990 NCAA tournament.

- Kills, match (team record) - 112 - Texas vs. LSU
