= 2003 NCAA Division I women's volleyball tournament =

Volleyball competition

2003 NCAA women's Division I volleyball tournament
- 2003 NCAA Final Four logo
- Champions: Southern California (3rd NCAA (6th national) title)
- Runner-up: Florida (1st title match)
- Semifinalists: Hawaiʻi (8th Final Four); Minnesota (1st Final Four)
- Winning coach: Mick Haley (3rd title)
- Most outstanding player: Keao Burdine (2nd) (Southern California)
- Final Four All-Tournament Team: Bibiana Candelas (Southern California); April Ross (Southern California); Jane Collymore (Florida); Aury Cruz (Florida); Cassie Busse (Minnesota)

The 2003 NCAA Division I women's volleyball tournament began on December 4, 2003, with 64 teams and ended on December 18 when Southern California defeated Florida 3 games to 1 in Dallas, Texas for the program's third NCAA title and sixth national title overall.

It was Southern California's second consecutive NCAA title. The team capped off the 2003 season undefeated at 35-0, becoming the third team in NCAA history to accomplish the feat, the first repeat NCAA national champion to go undefeated, and the first team in the NCAA era to be ranked #1 in the coaches' poll for the entire season.

Florida made the school's first national championship match in the program's seventh appearance in the NCAA Final Four. Minnesota also made the program's first NCAA Final Four appearance.

== Records ==
Three teams in the 2003 NCAA Volleyball Tournament qualified with either 0 or 1 losses: USC (29-0), Hawaii (32-1), and Florida (31-1). It is the most recent tournament to feature at least three such teams.

Lincoln Regional
| Seed | School | Conference | Berth Type | Record |
|---|---|---|---|---|
| | Arizona | Pac-10 | At-large | 17-14 |
| | Cal State Northridge | Big West | At-large | 16-12 |
| | Dayton | Atlantic 10 | Automatic | 25-9 |
| | Loyola Marymount | West Coast | At-large | 25-6 |
| | Michigan State | Big Ten | At-large | 19-11 |
| | Missouri | Big 12 | At-large | 18-10 |
| 9 | Nebraska | Big 12 | At-large | 26-4 |
| | New Hampshire | America East | Automatic | 23-11 |
| | Nicholls State | Southland | Automatic | 18-14 |
| | San Diego | West Coast | At-large | 17-12 |
| 16 | Texas A&M | Big 12 | At-large | 21-9 |
| | UC Irvine | Big West | At-large | 23-9 |
| 8 | UCLA | Pac-10 | At-large | 21-8 |
| 1 | USC | Pac-10 | Automatic | 29-0 |
| | Valparaiso | Mid-Continent | Automatic | 27-7 |
| | Wisconsin | Big Ten | At-large | 21-10 |

Gainesville Regional
| Seed | School | Conference | Berth Type | Record |
|---|---|---|---|---|
| | American | Patriot | Automatic | 22-9 |
| | Arkansas | SEC | At-large | 26-6 |
| | Cincinnati | Conference USA | At-large | 27-5 |
| 14 | Colorado State | Mountain West | Automatic | 28-4 |
| 3 | Florida | SEC | Automatic | 31-1 |
| | George Mason | CAA | Automatic | 16-14 |
| | Georgia Southern | Southern | Automatic | 27-9 |
| 6 | Kansas State | Big 12 | Automatic | 28-4 |
| | Maryland | ACC | Automatic | 26-7 |
| | Ohio | MAC | Automatic | 28-4 |
| | Penn | Ivy League | Automatic | 20-6 |
| 11 | Penn State | Big Ten | Automatic | 28-4 |
| | Pittsburgh | Big East | Automatic | 25-5 |
| | Robert Morris | Northeast | Automatic | 23-11 |
| | Southwest Missouri State | Missouri Valley | At-large | 27-5 |
| | UCF | Atlantic Sun | Automatic | 22-6 |

Long Beach Regional
| Seed | School | Conference | Berth Type | Record |
|---|---|---|---|---|
| | Green Bay | Horizon | Automatic | 23-10 |
| | Kansas | Big 12 | At-large | 21-10 |
| | Long Beach State | Big West | At-large | 19-10 |
| | Manhattan | MAAC | Automatic | 21-13 |
| 13 | Minnesota | Big Ten | At-large | 22-10 |
| | Northern Iowa | Missouri Valley | Automatic | 27-5 |
| | Northwestern | Big Ten | At-large | 18-14 |
| | Pacific | Big West | At-large | 17-13 |
| 4 | Pepperdine | West Coast | Automatic | 25-2 |
| | Sacramento State | Big Sky | Automatic | 23-11 |
| | San Francisco | West Coast | At-large | 23-7 |
| | Santa Clara | West Coast | At-large | 20-10 |
| 5 | Stanford | Pac-10 | At-large | 23-6 |
| | UC Santa Barbara | Big West | Automatic | 19-8 |
| | Utah | Mountain West | At-large | 20-8 |
| 12 | Washington | Pac-10 | At-large | 19-8 |

Honolulu Regional
| Seed | School | Conference | Berth Type | Record |
|---|---|---|---|---|
| | Alabama A&M | SWAC | Automatic | 23-5 |
| | BYU | Mountain West | At-large | 22-8 |
| 10 | California | Pac-10 | At-large | 23-6 |
| | Colorado | Big 12 | At-large | 21-9 |
| | Florida A&M | MEAC | Automatic | 26-3 |
| 7 | Georgia Tech | ACC | At-large | 31-3 |
| 2 | Hawaii | WAC | Automatic | 32-1 |
| | Idaho | Big West | At-large | 19-10 |
| 15 | Illinois | Big Ten | At-large | 24-6 |
| | Louisville | Conference USA | Automatic | 24-5 |
| | Michigan | Big Ten | At-large | 20-11 |
| | Murray State | Ohio Valley | Automatic | 24-5 |
| | New Mexico State | Sun Belt | Automatic | 30-4 |
| | Notre Dame | Big East | At-large | 23-6 |
| | Saint Mary's | West Coast | At-large | 20-12 |
| | Winthrop | Big South | Automatic | 24-12 |

== Lincoln Regional ==
First round December 4–5
1 | Southern California | 3
New Hampshire | 0
Los Angeles, CA
Cal St. Northridge | 0
Loyola Marymount | 3
Arizona | 1
Wisconsin | 3
College Station, TX
Nicholls St. | 0
16 | Texas A&M | 3
9 | Nebraska | 3
Valparaiso | 0
East Lansing, MI
Dayton | 3
Michigan State | 2
Missouri | 2
UC Irvine | 3
Los Angeles, CA
San Diego | 0
8 | UCLA | 3

Second round December 5–6
1 | Southern California | 3
Loyola Marymount | 0
Wisconsin | 0
16 | Texas A&M | 3
9 | Nebraska | 3
Dayton | 0
UC Irvine | 0
8 | UCLA | 3

Regional semifinals December 12
1 | Southern California | 3
16 | Texas A&M | 0
9 | Nebraska | 1
8 | UCLA | 3

Regional finals December 13
1 | Southern California | 3
8 | UCLA | 1

== Long Beach Regional ==
First round December 4–5
5 | Stanford | 3
Sacramento St. | 0
Stanford, CA
Pacific | 3
San Francisco | 0
Santa Clara | 2
Utah | 3
Seattle, WA
Northwestern | 0
12 | Washington | 3
13 | Minnesota | 3
Wisconsin-Green Bay | 0
Minneapolis, MN
UCSB | 2
Northern Iowa | 3
Kansas | 3
Long Beach St. | 0
Malibu, CA
Manhattan | 0
4 | Pepperdine | 3

Second round December 5–6
5 | Stanford | 3
Pacific | 0
Utah | 0
12 | Washington | 3
13 | Minnesota | 3
Northern Iowa | 1
Kansas | 1
4 | Pepperdine | 3

Regional semifinals December 12
5 | Stanford | 1
12 | Washington | 3
13 | Minnesota | 3
4 | Pepperdine | 2

Regional finals December 13
12 | Washington | 2
13 | Minnesota | 3

== Gainesville Regional ==
First round December 4–5
3 | Florida | 3
Georgia Southern | 0
Gainesville, FL
Cincinnati | 2
Central Florida | 3
Maryland | 3
American | 0
College Park, MD
George Mason | 0
14 | Colorado St. | 3
11 | Penn St. | 3
Robert Morris | 0
University Park, PA
Pittsburgh | 3
Pennsylvania | 1
SW Missouri St. | 1
Arkansas | 3
Manhattan, KS
Ohio | 0
6 | Kansas State | 3

Second round December 5–6
3 | Florida | 3
Central Florida | 0
Maryland | 0
14 | Colorado St. | 3
11 | Penn St. | 3
Pittsburgh | 1
Arkansas | 0
6 | Kansas State | 3

Regional semifinals December 12
3 | Florida | 3
14 | Colorado St. | 0
11 | Penn St. | 3
6 | Kansas State | 1

Regional finals December 13
3 | Florida | 3
11 | Penn St. | 0

== Honolulu Regional ==
First round December 4–5
7 | Georgia Tech | 3
Alabama A&M | 0
Atlanta, GA
Winthrop | 0
Florida A&M | 3
Colorado | 0
Michigan | 3
Berkeley, CA
St. Mary's | 0
10 | California | 3
15 | Illinois | 3
Murray St. | 0
Champaign, IL
Notre Dame | 0
Louisville | 3
New Mexico St. | 0
BYU | 3
Honolulu, HI
Idaho | 0
2 | Hawaiʻi | 3

Second round December 5–6
7 | Georgia Tech | 3
Florida A&M | 0
Michigan | 0
10 | California | 3
15 | Illinois | 3
Louisville | 0
BYU | 0
2 | Hawaiʻi | 3

Regional semifinals December 12
7 | Georgia Tech | 3
10 | California | 0
15 | Illinois | 0
2 | Hawaiʻi | 3

Regional finals December 13
7 | Georgia Tech | 1
2 | Hawaiʻi | 3

== Final Four – Reunion Arena, Dallas, Texas ==
National Semifinals; December 18
1 | Southern California | 3
13 | Minnesota | 0
3 | Florida | 3
2 | Hawaiʻi | 1

National Championship; December 20
1 | Southern California | 3
3 | Florida | 1

== National Semifinals ==
=== Southern California vs. Minnesota ===
| Teams | Game 1 | Game 2 | Game 3 |
| USC | 30 | 30 | 30 |
| MIN | 27 | 28 | 20 |

Minnesota, making their first NCAA Final Four appearance in program history, played top-seeded USC tough in the first two sets, falling 30-27, 30-28. USC rode the momentum in the third set, winning easily 30-20 to advance to the national championship match for the second consecutive year. USC's balanced attack consisted of three players with double digit kills, including Bibiana Candelas with 12, Keao Burdine with 13 and April Ross with 11. Cassie Busse led Minnesota with 23 kills, and Erin Martin with 11.

=== Florida vs. Hawaiʻi ===
| Teams | Game 1 | Game 2 | Game 3 | Game 4 |
| FLA | 30 | 30 | 23 | 30 |
| HAW | 28 | 28 | 30 | 28 |

Florida and Hawaiʻi battled in the second semifinal, with Florida seeking to advance to its first final in school history after being 0-for-6 in previous NCAA semifinals, while Hawaiʻi aimed to reach itsʻ first final since 1996.

Both teams played even in the first two games, but it was Florida who won them by the scores of 30-28 and 30-28. Hawaiʻi answered back after the break to win 30-23. The 30-23 loss was the first individual game the Gators lost since August 23, breaking their NCAA record of 105 straight game wins. Florida and Hawaiʻi once again played even in the fourth set, but Hawaiʻi was unable to force a fifth set as Florida won the fourth set, 30-28. Hawaiʻi was paced by AVCA National Player of the Year Kim Willoughby and Lily Kahumoku, who both had 21 kills.

== National Championship: Southern California vs. Florida ==
| Teams | Game 1 | Game 2 | Game 3 | Game 4 |
| USC | 25 | 30 | 30 | 30 |
| FLA | 30 | 27 | 19 | 26 |

Florida started out the match well by winning the first set off of undefeated Southern California. USC answered back by taking the second set 30-27 and used a 6-0 run in the third set to win easily, 30-19. In the fourth set, USC never trailed and led 22-15 before Florida mounted a comeback to cut USC's lead to 25-23. USC did not let up and won the fourth and final set 30-26 to cap off an undefeated season at 35-0. Florida ended their season at 36-2, with their only other loss coming to USC in the season-opening AVCA Showcase tournament.
