= AVCA Showcase =

Volleyball tournament

The AVCA Showcase, established by the American Volleyball Coaches Association, was an annual NCAA volleyball tournament that was held at the start of each fall season. In the old format, four teams, usually ranked in the top 15, compete for the showcase title. In the new format, it was changed to a conference challenge.

The tournament was founded in 1995, and ten times, the showcase champion has made the NCAA Women's Volleyball Championship final four, with the team winning the national championship twice.

Prior to 2005, it was called the "State Farm/NACWAA Classic". At the start of 2008, Runza Restaurants started sponsoring, thus the name becoming "Runza/AVCA Showcase".

== History ==
As of 2007, the showcase champion went on to the NCAA Final Four 10 times out of 13. The only time the winner failed to advance to the Final Four was Colorado State in 2000, Texas in 2006 and Nebraska in 2007. However, only twice has the showcase champion won the NCAA Championship: Long Beach State in 1998 and Southern California in 2003. Those two schools both had undefeated records en route to the NCAA title. The only other school to go undefeated in the NCAA era (since 1981) was Nebraska in 2000.

The following table lists the past winners, runners-up, city the tournament is hosted in, and the Most Valuable Player.

=== Old format ===
Prior to 2008, the showcase was done with four teams, with the winners of the first match playing for the championship and the losers playing for third place in the consolation match.

Year	Winner	Score	Runner-up	City	Tournament MVP
1995	Stanford	3–1; 8–15, 15–11, 15–13, 17–15	Nebraska	Lincoln, Nebraska	N/A
1996	Hawaiʻi	3–0	Nebraska	Normal, Illinois	Anjelica Ljungquist, Hawaii
1997	Penn State	3–0; 15–8, 15–13, 15–9	Stanford	Stanford, California	Bonnie Bremner, Penn State
1998	Long Beach State	3–2; 15–7, 10–15, 15–1, 9–15, 15–12	Southern California	Albuquerque, New Mexico	Misty May, Long Beach State
1999	Pacific	3–2; 9–15, 16–14, 15–10, 9–15, 15–10	Florida	Lincoln, Nebraska	Elsa Stegemann, Pacific
2000	Colorado State	3–2; 15–8, 8–15, 15–12, 11–15, 17–15	UCLA	Gainesville, Florida	Courtney Cox, Colorado State
2001	Nebraska	3–1; 30–21, 32–30, 27–30, 30–24	Pacific	Stockton, California	Nancy Metcalf, Nebraska
2002	Stanford	3–1; 30–21, 24–30, 30–27, 30–21	Minnesota	Minneapolis, Minnesota	Logan Tom, Stanford
2003	Southern California	3–0; 30–22, 30–26, 31–29	Hawaiʻi	Honolulu, Hawaii	April Ross, Southern California
2004	Southern California	3–2; 25–30, 32–30, 26–30, 30–28, 15–12	Minnesota	Fort Collins, Colorado	Bibiana Candelas, Southern California
2005	Nebraska	3–0; 30–23, 31–29, 33–31	Stanford	Omaha, Nebraska	Christina Houghtelling, Nebraska
2006	Texas	3–2; 30–23, 24–30, 30–27, 28–30, 15–13	Washington	Madison, Wisconsin	Michelle Moriarty, Texas
2007	Nebraska	3–1; 30–23, 22–30, 30–18, 30–21	UCLA	Omaha, Nebraska	Sarah Pavan, Nebraska

=== New format ===
In 2008, the AVCA announced that the showcase would take on a new format. Instead of four teams competing in a tradition 1st–4th place tournament, it would be two teams from an athletic conference taking on two teams from another athletic conference. The two teams from the same conference do not play each other. The tournament was held in Omaha, Nebraska at the Qwest Center through 2010, and was known as Rockvale Outlets/AVCA Showcase and was held at Penn State in 2011.

Year	Conferences	National rank/teams/record	Records for tournament	City	All-Tournament Team
2008	Big 12; Pac-10	#7 Nebraska (2–0) #3 Texas (1–1) #2 Stanford (1–1) #4 Southern California (0–2)	v. Stanford: W 3–0; v. Southern California W 3–1 v. Southern California W 3–0; v. Stanford L 2–3 v. Nebraska L 0–3; v. Texas W 3–2 v. Texas L 0–3; v. Nebraska L 1–3	Omaha, Nebraska; Qwest Center	Jordan Larson (Neb.); Sydney Anderson (Neb.); Kayla Banwarth (Neb.); Destinee Hooker (Tex.); Ashley Engle (Tex.); Cynthia Barboza (Stan.); Cassidy Lichtman (Stan.); Alex Jupiter (USC)
2009	Big Ten; Big 12	#11 Minnesota (1–1) #16 Michigan (2–0) #3 Nebraska (1–1) #22 Kansas State (0–2)	v. Kansas State W 3–2; v. Nebraska L 2–3 v. Nebraska W 3–0; v. Kansas State W 3–1 v. Michigan: L 0–3; v. Minnesota W 3–2 v. Minnesota L 2–3; v. Michigan L 1–3	Omaha, Nebraska; Qwest Center	Alex Hunt (Mich.); Juliana Paz (Mich.); Lexi Zimmerman (Mich.); Taylor Carico (Minn.); Lauren Gibbemeyer (Minn.); Sydney Anderson (Neb.); Brooke Delano (Neb); Kelsey Chipman (KSU)
2010	Big 12; SEC	#2 Nebraska (1–1) #9 Iowa State (1–1) #13 Florida (2–0) #14 Kentucky (0–2)	v. Kentucky W 3–0; v. Florida L 2–3 v. Florida L 1–3; v. Kentucky W 3–0 v. Iowa State: W 3–1; v. Nebraska W 3–2 v. Nebraska L 0–3; v. Iowa State L 0–3	Omaha, Nebraska; Qwest Center	Blaire Hiller (Ky.); Victoria Henson (Iowa St.); Alison Landwehr (Iowa St.); Kayla Banwarth (Neb.); Lindsey Licht (Neb.); Lauren Bledsoe (Fl.); Callie Rivers (Fl.); Kelly Murphy (Fl)
2011	Big Ten; Pac-12	#1 Penn State (1–1) #12 Minnesota (1–1); Oregon (1–1) #2 USC (1–1)	v. Oregon L 1–3; v. USC W 3–2 v. USC L 2–3; v. Oregon W 3–2 v. Penn State: W 3–1; v. Minnesota L 2–3 v. Minnesota W 3–2; v. Penn State L 2–3	University Park, Pennsylvania; Rec Hall	Deja McClendon (PSU); Micha Hancock (PSU); Ashley Wittman (Minn.); Jessica Granquist (Minn.); Alaina Bergsma (Ore.); Alex Jupiter (USC.)

== Other teams ==
The following is a list of teams that participated, but never won or finished as runners-up in the tournament.

Year(s) participated and finish	Team
1997: 3rd	Brigham Young
1995: 4th	Cal State Northridge
2004: 4th	Georgia Tech
1996: 4th	Illinois State
2003: 4th; 2009: 4th	Kansas State
1998: 4th	New Mexico
2002: 3rd	Northern Iowa
2006: 4th	Ohio
2002: 4th	Pepperdine
2007: 4th	Tennessee
1997: 4th	Texas A&M
2007: 4th	Utah
1998: 3rd; 2001: 3rd; 2006: 3rd	Wisconsin
