= Swatch FIVB World Tour 2011 =

Tournament details
- Host country: Various
- Dates: April - November, 2011

The Swatch FIVB World Tour 2011 is an international beach volleyball competition.

The tour consists of 17 tournaments with both genders and 5 separate gender tournaments.

== Grand Slam ==
There are six Grand Slam tournaments and one World Championships. These events give a higher number of points and more money than the rest of the tournaments.

- Beijing, China – Beijing Grand Slam, 6–11 June 2011
- Rome, Italy – 2011 Beach Volleyball World Championships, 13–19 June 2011
- Stavanger, Norway – ConocoPhillips Grand Slam, June 27-July 3, 2011
- Gstaad, Switzerland – 1 to 1 Energy Grand Slam, 4–10 July 2011
- Moscow, Russia – Grand Slam Moscow, 11–17 July 2011
- Stare Jabłonki, Poland – Mazury Orlen Grand Slam, 25–31 July 2010
- Klagenfurt, Austria – A1 presented by Volksbank, August 1–7, 2011

== Tournament results ==
=== Women ===
Event	Gold	Silver	Bronze
Brasília Open	(Brazil) Larissa-Juliana	(United States) Walsh-May-Treanor	(United States) Kessy-Ross
Sanya Open	(Brazil) Larissa-Juliana	(China) Xue-Zhang Xi	(Brazil) Antonelli-Talita
China Shanghai Jinshan Open	(Netherlands) van Iersel-Keizer	(United States) Kessy-Ross	(Austria) Schwaiger-Schwaiger
Myslowice Open	(Netherlands) van Iersel-Keizer	(Italy) Cicolari-Menegatti	(United States) Kessy-Ross
Beijing Grand Slam	(United States) Walsh-May-Treanor	(Germany) Holtwick-Semmler	(United States) Kessy-Ross
World Championships	(Brazil) Larissa-Juliana	(United States) Walsh-May-Treanor	(China) Xue-Zhang Xi
ConocoPhillips Grand Slam	(United States) Kessy-Ross	(Germany) Goller-Ludwig	(Brazil) Larissa-Juliana
1 to 1 Energy Grand Slam	(Brazil) Larissa-Juliana	(China) Xue-Zhang Xi	(Italy) Cicolari-Menegatti
Grand Slam Moscow	(United States) Walsh-May-Treanor	(Brazil) Larissa-Juliana	(China) Xue-Zhang Xi
Québec Open Jeep	(Brazil) Antonelli-Talita	(Brazil) Maria Clara-Carol	(Brazil) Lima-Vivian
Mazury Orlen Grand Slam	(Brazil) Larissa-Juliana	(United States) Kessy-Ross	(Brazil) Antonelli-Talita
A1 Grand Slam	(United States) Walsh-May-Treanor	(China) Xue-Zhang Xi	(Netherlands) van Iersel-Keizer
PAF Open	(China) Xue-Zhang Xi	(United States) Walsh-May-Treanor	(Brazil) Larissa-Juliana
The Hague Open	(Brazil) Larissa-Juliana	(United States) Walsh-May-Treanor	(Brazil) Antonelli-Talita
Phuket Thailand Open	(China) Xue-Zhang Xi	(United States) Kessy-Ross	(Italy) Cicolari-Menegatti

=== Men ===
Event	Gold	Silver	Bronze
Brasília Open	(United States) Rogers-Dalhausser	(Brazil) Emanuel-Alison	(China) Xu-Wu
China Shanghai Open	(United States) Rogers-Dalhausser	(United States) Gibb-Rosenthal	(Germany) Brink-Reckermann
Prague Open	(Brazil) Emanuel-Alison	(United States) Rogers-Dalhausser	(Switzerland) Heyer-Chevallier
Beijing Grand Slam	(Brazil) Emanuel-Alison	(Germany) Brink-Reckermann	(Switzerland) Bellaguarda-Heuscher
World Championships	(Brazil) Emanuel-Alison	(Brazil) Márcio Araújo-Ricardo	(Germany) Brink-Reckermann
ConocoPhillips Grand Slam	(Brazil) Márcio Araújo-Ricardo	(Poland) Fijalek-Prudel	(Germany) Brink-Reckermann
1 to 1 Energy Grand Slam	(Brazil) Emanuel-Alison	(United States) Rogers-Dalhausser	(Germany) Brink-Reckermann
Grand Slam Moscow	(Brazil) Emanuel-Alison	(Switzerland) Bellaguarda-Heuscher	(United States) Rogers-Dalhausser
Québec Open Jeep	(United States) Rogers-Dalhausser	(United States) Fuerbringer-Lucena	(United States) Gibb-Rosenthal
Mazury Orlen Grand Slam	(United States) Rogers-Dalhausser	(Poland) Fijalek-Prudel	(Brazil) Emanuel-Alison
A1 Grand Slam	(Brazil) Cunha-Ricardo	(Germany) Brink-Reckermann	(United States) Rogers-Dalhausser
PAF Open	(Brazil) Márcio Araújo-Benjamin	(United States) Rogers-Dalhausser	(Brazil) Emanuel-Alison
The Hague Open	(Brazil) Cunha-Ricardo	(Netherlands) Nummerdor-Schuil	(Russia) Semenov-Koshkarev
Agadir Open	(Netherlands) Nummerdor-Schuil	(Germany) Brink-Reckermann	(Brazil) Pedro-Ferramenta

== Medal table by country ==
Rank	Nation	Gold	Silver	Bronze	Total
1	Brazil (BRA)	16	4	9	29
2	United States (USA)	8	12	6	26
3	Netherlands (NED)	3	1	1	5
4	China (CHN)	2	3	3	8
5	Germany (GER)	0	4	4	8
6	Poland (POL)	0	2	0	2
7	Italy (ITA)	0	1	2	3
7	Switzerland (SUI)	0	1	2	3
9	Austria (AUT)	0	0	1	1
9	Russia (RUS)	0	0	1	1
Totals (10 entries)		29	28	29	86
