= Lyon Center =

Student recreational facility in USC

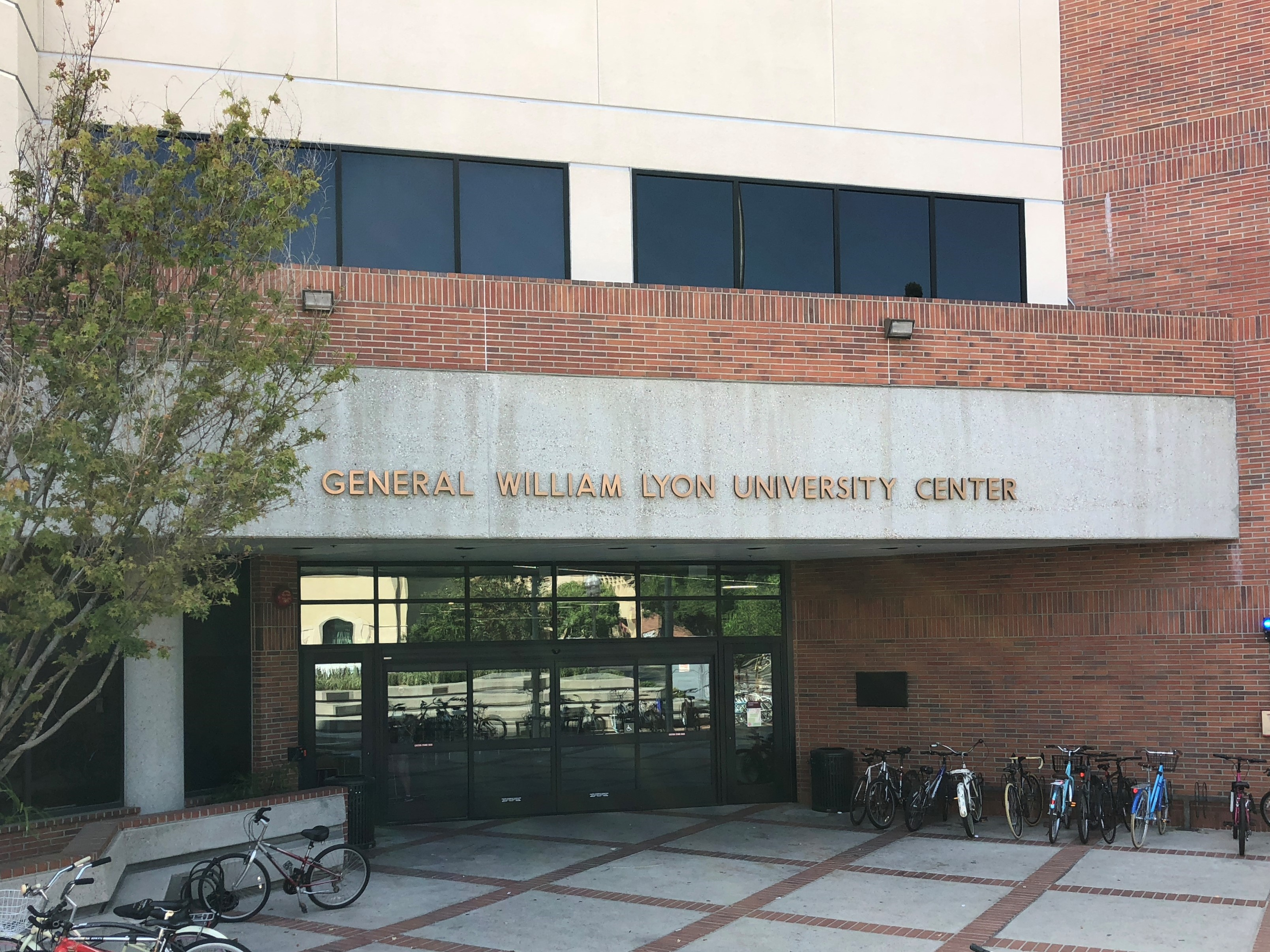
- Interactive map of Lyon Center
- Location: 1026 W. 34th St. Los Angeles
- Coordinates: 34.021°N 118.286°W
- Owner: University of Southern California
- Operator: University of Southern California
- Capacity: 1,500
- Surface: Multi-Purpose

Construction
- Opened: 1989

Tenants
- University of Southern California; USC Trojans men's volleyball (1989–present); USC Trojans women's volleyball (1989–present)

The Lyon Center or Lyon Recreation Center is a student recreational facility and part-time varsity athletics facility located on the campus of the University of Southern California in Los Angeles. The Lyon Center's full name is the General William Lyon University Center and is named for William Lyon, a former General in the United States Army Air Corps and United States Air Force. The facility is adjacent to the Uytengsu Aquatics Center.

== History ==
The Lyon Center opened in 1989 as the Student Recreation Center for the University of Southern California. The main gym also serves as a home for the USC Trojans men's and women's varsity volleyball teams. From 1989 to 2006, the North Gym in the USC Physical Education building and the Lyon Center split time as the team's home court. In 2007, the teams moved to the Galen Center as their home court, but use the North Gym and Lyon Center main gym if the Galen Center is reserved for other events. The USC Trojans men's basketball team has also used the main gym for exhibition games.

The Lyon Center had its second floor renovated in 2008. In 2011, the basketball courts and locker rooms were renovated. The Lyon Center underwent another renovation and expansion in 2017.

== Amenities ==
- 1,500-seat main gym (Intramural sports–badminton, basketball, volleyball, and varsity men's and women's volleyball)
- Klug Family Fitness Center (weight room)
- Racquetball and squash courts
- Stretching room
- Table tennis tables
- Bouldering wall
- Group exercise studio
- Dance room
- Locker rooms

== See also ==
- University of Southern California
- USC Trojans
