= Kerri Walsh Jennings =

American professional beach volleyball player

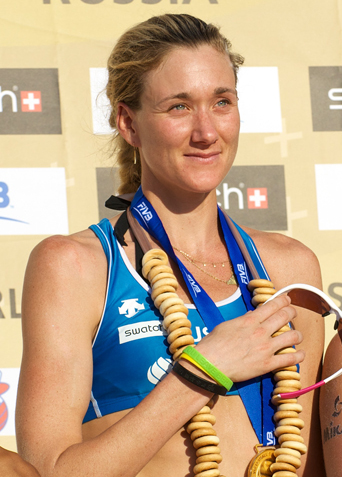
- Walsh Jennings after winning the FIVB Moscow Grand Slam in 2011

Personal information
- Full name: Kerri Lee Walsh Jennings
- Nickname: Six Feet of Sunshine
- Born: August 15, 1978 (age 48) Santa Clara, California, U.S.
- Education: Stanford University
- Height: 6 ft 3 in (191 cm)
- Weight: 157 lb (71 kg)
Beach volleyball information
Current teammate
- Years: Teammate
- 2019–present: Brooke Sweat
Previous teammates
- Years: Teammate
- 2013–2017 2011–2012 2010 2001–2009: April Ross; Misty May-Treanor; Nicole Branagh; Misty May-Treanor
Medal record
Women's beach volleyball
Representing the United States
Olympic Games
Gold medal – first place	2004 Athens	Beach
Gold medal – first place	2008 Beijing	Beach
Gold medal – first place	2012 London	Beach
Bronze medal – third place	2016 Rio de Janeiro	Beach
World Championships
Gold medal – first place	2003 Rio de Janeiro	Beach
Gold medal – first place	2005 Berlin	Beach
Gold medal – first place	2007 Gstaad	Beach
Silver medal – second place	2011 Rome	Beach
World Tour
Gold medal – first place	2002 Madrid	Beach
Gold medal – first place	2002 Gstaad	Beach
Gold medal – first place	2002 Montreal	Beach
Gold medal – first place	2002 Klagenfurt	Beach
Gold medal – first place	2002 Maoming	Beach
Gold medal – first place	2003 Gstaad	Beach
Gold medal – first place	2003 Marseille	Beach
Gold medal – first place	2003 Klagenfurt	Beach
Gold medal – first place	2003 Carson	Beach
Gold medal – first place	2004 Fortaleza	Beach
Gold medal – first place	2004 Rhodes	Beach
Gold medal – first place	2004 Gstaad	Beach
Gold medal – first place	2004 Marseille	Beach
Gold medal – first place	2004 Klagenfurt	Beach
Gold medal – first place	2005 Portugal	Beach
Gold medal – first place	2005 Paris	Beach
Gold medal – first place	2005 Klagenfurt	Beach
Gold medal – first place	2005 Brazil	Beach
Gold medal – first place	2005 South Africa	Beach
Gold medal – first place	2006 Greece	Beach
Gold medal – first place	2006 Gstaad	Beach
Gold medal – first place	2006 Mexico	Beach
Gold medal – first place	2007 Paris	Beach
Gold medal – first place	2007 Montreal	Beach
Gold medal – first place	2007 Berlin	Beach
Gold medal – first place	2007 Klagenfurt	Beach
Gold medal – first place	2007 Brazil	Beach
Gold medal – first place	2007 Phuket	Beach
Gold medal – first place	2008 Berlin	Beach
Gold medal – first place	2008 Paris	Beach
Gold medal – first place	2008 Stavanger	Beach
Gold medal – first place	2008 Dubai	Beach
Gold medal – first place	2010 Phuket	Beach
Gold medal – first place	2011 Beijing	Beach
Gold medal – first place	2011 Moscow	Beach
Gold medal – first place	2011 Klagenfurt	Beach
Gold medal – first place	2012 Gstaad	Beach
Gold medal – first place	2013 São Paulo	Beach
Gold medal – first place	2013 Xiamen	Beach
Gold medal – first place	2014 Fuzhou	Beach
Gold medal – first place	2014 Moscow	Beach
Gold medal – first place	2014 Stavanger	Beach
Gold medal – first place	2014 Long Beach	Beach
Gold medal – first place	2016 Rio de Janeiro	Beach
Gold medal – first place	2016 Fuzhou	Beach
Gold medal – first place	2016 Cincinnati	Beach
Gold medal – first place	2016 Moscow	Beach
Gold medal – first place	2016 Long Beach	Beach
Gold medal – first place	2019 Jinjiang	Beach
Silver medal – second place	2002 Marseille	Beach
Silver medal – second place	2002 Mallorca	Beach
Silver medal – second place	2002 Vitória	Beach
Silver medal – second place	2003 Stavanger	Beach
Silver medal – second place	2005 Acapulco	Beach
Silver medal – second place	2006 Italy	Beach
Silver medal – second place	2006 Paris	Beach
Silver medal – second place	2011 Brasília	Beach
Silver medal – second place	2011 PAF	Beach
Silver medal – second place	2011 The Hague	Beach
Silver medal – second place	2012 Moscow	Beach
Silver medal – second place	2015 Long Beach	Beach
Silver medal – second place	2016 Vitória	Beach
Silver medal – second place	2016 Gstaad	Beach
Silver medal – second place	2019 Kuala Lumpur	Beach
Silver medal – second place	2020 Qinzhou	Beach
Bronze medal – third place	2002 Osaka	Beach
Bronze medal – third place	2003 Rhodes	Beach
Bronze medal – third place	2004 Stavanger	Beach
Bronze medal – third place	2006 Brazil	Beach
Bronze medal – third place	2006 Thailand	Beach
Bronze medal – third place	2007 Stavanger	Beach
Bronze medal – third place	2015 Fuzhou	Beach
Bronze medal – third place	2016 Xiamen	Beach
Bronze medal – third place	2019 Chetumal	Beach
Bronze medal – third place	2019 Sydney	Beach
Bronze medal – third place	2019 Moscow	Beach
- Updated on 2024

Kerri Lee Walsh Jennings (born August 15, 1978) is a retired American professional beach volleyball player, three-time Olympic gold medalist, and a one-time Olympic bronze medalist. She won 135 international and domestic tournaments, being the beach volleyball leader in career victories in the United States.

Walsh Jennings and teammate Misty May-Treanor were the gold medalists in beach volleyball at the 2004, 2008 and 2012 Summer Olympics. They also won the FIVB Beach Volleyball World Championships in 2003, 2005 and 2007. The pair set various records throughout their partnership, including a win streak of 112 consecutive matches (19 consecutive tournament titles) in 2007–2008, breaking their own previous record of 89 consecutive match wins. They have been called "the greatest beach volleyball team of all time."

== Early years ==
Walsh was born in Santa Clara, California, the daughter of Margery Lee (née Formico, Italian American) and Timothy Joseph Walsh. Walsh grew up in Scotts Valley, six miles (9.7 km) north of Santa Cruz. She attended grade school there until the end of her middle school years. Before she started high school, her family moved to San Jose. Walsh attended Archbishop Mitty High School, competing on the volleyball and basketball teams. She led her school's teams to three state championships in volleyball, in 1993, 1994 and 1995. She also led her school's basketball team to a state championship in 1995. She was named Gatorade National High School Volleyball Player of the Year in 1996, the first time the award was given. Walsh was also the #1 volleyball athlete recruit in the nation her senior year (1995.) While in high school she competed against her future beach doubles partner, Misty May-Treanor.

== College ==
Walsh attended Stanford University on a volleyball scholarship. While there she was selected as a first-team All-American four years in a row, becoming only the second player in the history of collegiate volleyball to be chosen first team all four years of their collegiate careers. While at Stanford her school's volleyball team won over 90% of its matches, posting a 122–11 overall record. The Cardinal won four Pac-10 titles and three times reached the NCAA Final Four, winning the title in 1996 and 1997, and falling to Penn State in the championship game in her senior year in 1999. She was selected as the MVP of the Final Four in 1996, and was co-National Player of the Year in 1999. She was also the first player in PAC-10 history to record over 1,500 kills (1,553), 1,200 digs (1,285) and 500 blocks (502). Walsh is considered to be one of the best all-around players in collegiate volleyball history. She graduated from Stanford in 2001 with a B.A. in American studies.

== Professional career ==
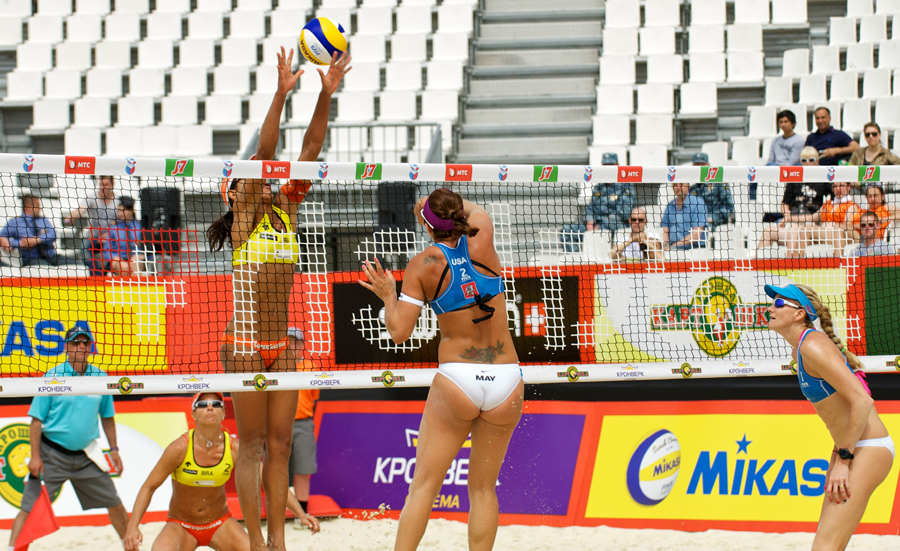
Walsh (right) at Grand Slam Moscow, 2012

Walsh Jennings plays professional beach volleyball on the U.S. AVP Tour and internationally on the FIVB World Tour. For most of her career she played with partner Misty May-Treanor, forming the most successful beach pairings in AVP history. May and Walsh formed a partnership on the beach circuit in 2001, finishing the season with the number five ranking in the world. In 2002 the team reached the number one ranking. They continued their dominance in 2003, winning all eight tournaments they entered and a then-record 90 straight matches, including the world championships where they upset defending world champions Brazil in the final.

In 2010 May-Treanor and Walsh extended a winning streak to 112 matches before losing to Olympic teammates Elaine Youngs and Nicole Branagh in the AVP Crocs Cup Shootout in Ohio. To that point the pair had won 19 straight titles.

Following the retirement of partner Misty May-Treanor in 2012, Walsh teamed with April Ross. She went on to break the career record for most wins by a female professional volleyball player when she won the FIVB Grand Slam in Xiamen, China. The win gave Walsh the 113th title of her career, breaking the old mark set by May-Treanor. Walsh and Ross won 21–14, 17–21, 15–12 over the Brazilian pair of Taiana Lima and Talita Da Rocha Antunes. It was the Americans' third title in five events since joining forces.

=== World tour 2016 ===
She played alongside partner April Ross at the Long Beach, California Grand Slam, which is part of the FIVB Beach Volleyball World Tour. The pair won all 3 matches, against Carolina Horta Maximo|Carol/Ana Patricia Silva Ramos|Ana Patrícia Brazil (21–17, 21–19), Humana-Paredes/Pischke Canada (21–16, 21–17), and Maria Antonelli/Lili Brazil (21–19, 18–21, 15–13).

In semi final action (August 27, 2016) Walsh Jennings and Ross played against Chantal Laboureur/Julia Sude of Germany and won in straight sets (21–17, 21–16). In the finals Walsh Jennings/Ross defeated Spain's Liliana Fernández Steiner and Elsa Baquerizo McMillan in straight sets (21–16, 21–16) to win the gold medal.

Competing at the World Tour Finals in Toronto, playing in Pool A they are in 1st with a 2-0 and advance to quarter finals.

=== 2017 ===
In 2017, Walsh Jennings announced she was not signing a new contract with AVP because of disagreements with the organization. Ross re-signed with the AVP. She and Walsh Jennings ended their partnership. Walsh Jennings then reteamed with Nicole Branagh, with whom she briefly competed during May-Treanor's 2010 break from beach volleyball.

=== 2018-2019 ===
In October 2018 Walsh Jennings announces she would be partnering with Brooke Sweat in hopes of qualifying for the Tokyo Games in 2020. Brooke Sweat is a defensive specialist, she has won defensive player of the year on the AVP (Association of Volleyball Professionals) tour four times. The pair failed to qualify for the games which were postponed until 2021.

== Olympic appearances ==
=== Sydney 2000 ===
Walsh played in the 2000 Summer Olympics as an opposite hitter on the U.S. women's indoor team, earning a fourth-place finish. She missed several of her first games due to a false positive on a drug test, which indicated a suspicious epitestosterone to testosterone ratio. After being retested, Walsh was cleared of any wrongdoing and allowed to continue playing.

=== Athens 2004 ===
At the 2004 Summer Olympics, Walsh and Misty May-Treanor won the gold medal in women's beach volleyball without losing a single set in all seven Olympic matches.

=== Beijing 2008 ===
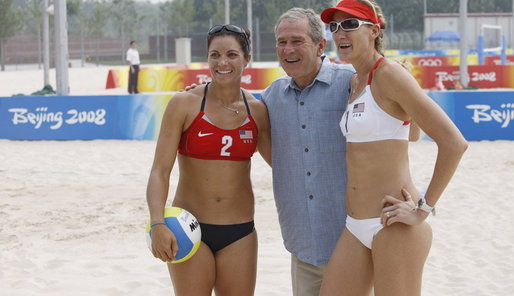
U.S. President George W. Bush visits Walsh Jennings and May-Treanor while at the 2008 Olympics.

On August 21, 2008, Walsh Jennings and May-Treanor repeated as Olympic gold medalists, defeating the first-seeded Chinese team in the final match (they would have been first-seeded, but home rule put them in the #2 spot with China as the #1). May-Treanor and Walsh did not lose a set in either of the past two Olympics. Their final match extended their unbeaten streak to 108 matches.

=== London 2012 ===
Walsh and May-Treanor competed together for the last time in the 2012 Summer Olympics in London. After first and second round wins, they continued their Olympic win streak of 32 consecutive sets without a loss until losing the first set of three to Austria in a preliminary round before ultimately winning the match, 17–21; 21–8; 15–10. The pair faced China in the semi-finals, where they won a hard-fought victory over Xue Chen and Zhang Xi 22–20, 22–20 to reach the finals. In an all USA final they defeated fellow Americans Jen Kessy and April Ross, 21–16, 21–16 to win the gold medal. The victory placed Walsh and May-Treanor as one of the few athletes to have won the gold medal in three consecutive Olympiads.

=== Rio de Janeiro 2016 ===
Walsh Jennings partnered with April Ross for the 2016 Olympic Games in Rio de Janeiro. The pair reached the semi-finals, where they fell to Brazil's Ágatha Bednarczuk and Bárbara Seixas in two hard fought sets, (22-20, 21–18). In the bronze medal match, Walsh Jennings and Ross faced the number one ranked team of Larissa França/Talita Antunes from Brazil. This was the match many thought would be played for the gold medal, but Larissa and Talita had been upset in the semifinals by Germany's Laura Ludwig and Kira Walkenhorst, throwing the two top teams into the bronze medal match. Walsh Jennings and Ross dropped the first set and were down by three in the second before coming back to win, 17–21, 21–17, 15–9. The bronze medal was Walsh Jennings's fourth Olympic medal, making her the most decorated beach volleyball player–male or female–in Olympic history.

== Media appearances ==
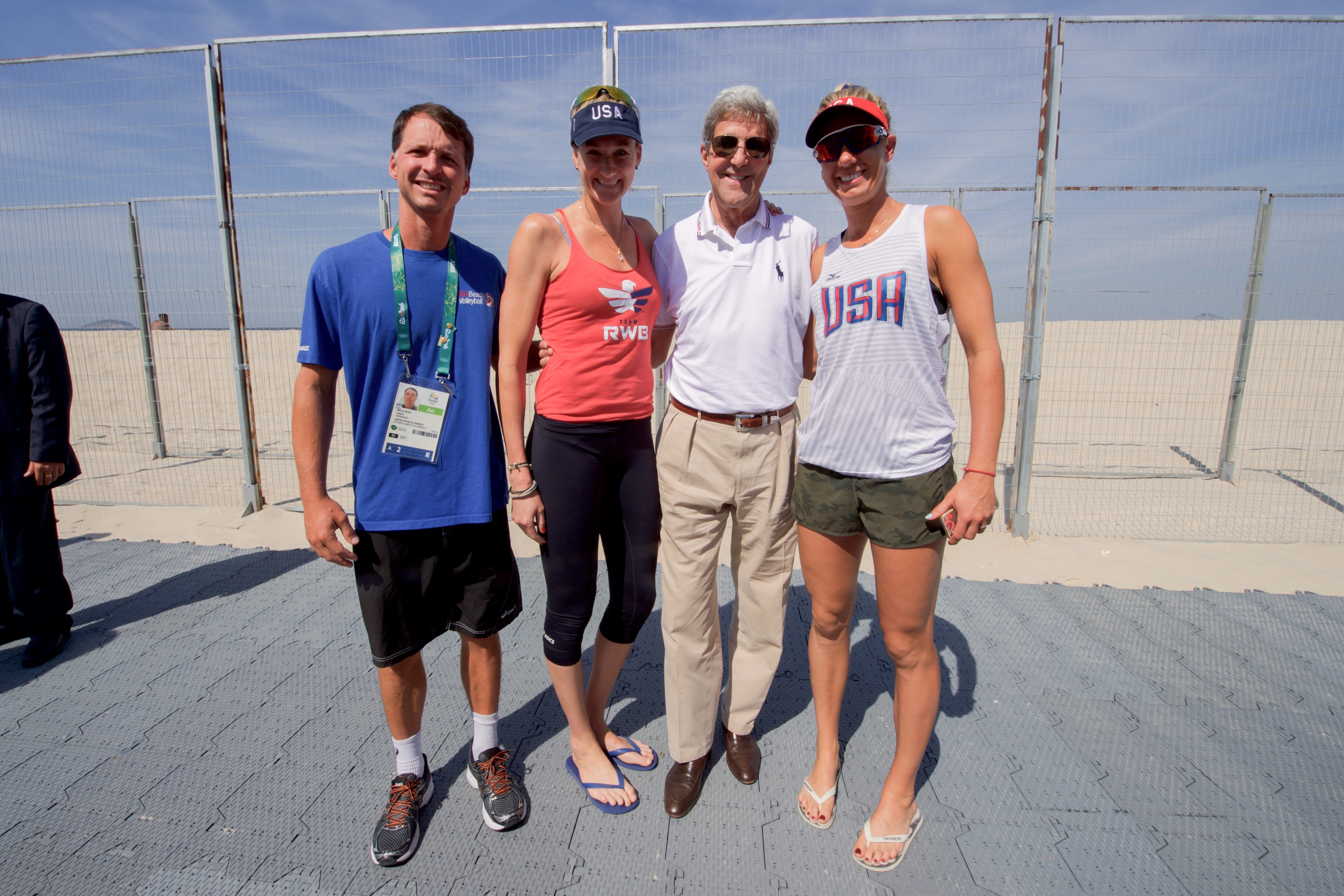
Walsh with April Ross and John Kerry

In February 2006, Walsh Jennings had a guest-starring role in an episode of CSI: Miami along with several other AVP Volleyball players.

Walsh Jennings hosts a weekly, one-hour radio show on Sirius Satellite Radio's Faction 28 station. It airs every Sunday at 9 AM Eastern time.

Walsh Jennings appeared in the Game Show Network television show Extreme Dodgeball. She was a member of the Detroit Spoilers, who lost all ten games they played.

Walsh Jennings also appeared alongside her volleyball partner Misty May-Treanor on the show Shaq Vs. in August 2009.

Walsh appeared in the ESPN The Magazine "Body Issue", with images taken both before and after giving birth to her third child.

Walsh appeared in the twelfth season of Hell's Kitchen where she gave the team challenge winner a private volleyball lesson.

In 2015, Walsh Jennings and her husband appeared on Celebrity Wife Swap. She swapped places with Tami Roman from the television show Basketball Wives.

In the wake of the outbreak of COVID-19, Walsh has expressed disagreement with mask mandates resulting in criticism from those who believe such protests help the spread of the disease.

== Personal life ==
In 2005, Walsh married fellow American pro beach-volleyball player Casey Jennings. They have three children, two sons and a daughter. Walsh was five weeks pregnant during the 2012 London Summer Olympics.

Walsh trained on the sand split between Hermosa Beach and Manhattan Beach in Los Angeles, California, and from 2002 did additional training in the gym at O.C. Fast-Twitch with trainer Tommy Knox.

== Awards and honors ==
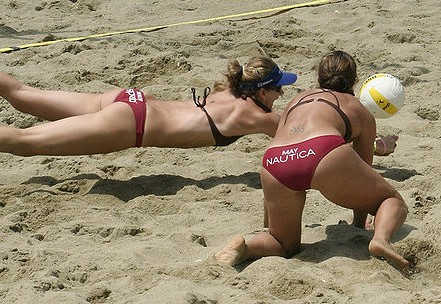
Walsh (left) with Misty May-Treanor in 2005

- AVP Best Offensive Player (2): 2003, 2014
- AVP Crocs Cup Champion (3): 2006, 2007, 2008 (all with Misty May-Treanor)
- AVP Most Valuable Player (2): 2003, 2004
- AVP Team of the Year (8): 2003, 2004, 2005, 2006, 2007, 2008 (with Misty May-Treanor), 2014, 2016 (with April Ross)
- AVP Best Defensive Player (Blocker) (1): 2008
- FIVB Best Blocker (7): 2005, 2006, 2007, 2008, 2011, 2012, 2014
- FIVB Best Hitter (5): 2005, 2006, 2007, 2012, 2016
- FIVB Best Offensive Player (2): 2007, 2014
- FIVB Most Outstanding (4): 2007, 2012, 2013, 2014
- FIVB Sportsperson (5): 2005, 2006, 2007, 2008, 2012
- FIVB Tour Champion (1): 2002 (with Misty May-Treanor)
- Sportswoman of the Year Award (2): 2004 and 2006 (with Misty May-Treanor)

== Achievements ==
- Most women's career tournament victories: 133
- Most women's career earnings: $2,561,635
- Record win streak of 112 consecutive matches and 19 straight tournaments that lasted from August 2007 to August 2008

Sporting positions
Preceded by Adriana Behar and Shelda Bede (BRA)	Women's FIVB Beach World Tour Winner alongside (United States) Misty May-Treanor; 2002	Succeeded by Sandra Pires and Ana Paula Connelly (BRA)
Awards
Preceded by Inaugural	Women's FIVB World Tour "Best Blocker"; 2005–2008	Succeeded by Juliana Silva (BRA)
Preceded by Juliana Silva (BRA)	Women's FIVB World Tour "Best Blocker"; 2011–2012	Succeeded by Talita Antunes (BRA)
Preceded by Talita Antunes (BRA)	Women's FIVB World Tour "Best Blocker"; 2014	Succeeded by Sarah Pavan (CAN)
Preceded by Inaugural	Women's FIVB World Tour "Best Hitter"; 2005–2007	Succeeded by Larissa França (BRA)
Preceded by April Ross (USA)	Women's FIVB World Tour "Best Hitter"; 2012	Succeeded by Talita Antunes (BRA)
Preceded by Talita Antunes (BRA)	Women's FIVB World Tour "Best Hitter"; 2016	Succeeded by Kira Walkenhorst (GER)
Preceded by Juliana Silva (BRA)	Women's FIVB World Tour "Best Attacker" alongside (United States) Misty May-Treanor; 2007	Succeeded by Misty May-Treanor (USA)
Preceded by Talita Antunes (BRA)	Women's FIVB World Tour "Best Attacker"; 2014	Succeeded by Larissa França (BRA)
Preceded by Denise Johns (GBR)	Women's FIVB World Tour "Most Inspirational"; 2011–2012	Succeeded by Laura Ludwig (GER)
Preceded by Laura Ludwig (GER)	Women's FIVB World Tour "Most Inspirational"; 2014	Succeeded by Pata Miller (VAN)
Preceded by Larissa França (BRA)	Women's FIVB World Tour "Most Outstanding"; 2007	Succeeded by Misty May-Treanor (USA); Zhang Xi (CHN)
Preceded by Juliana Silva (BRA)	Women's FIVB World Tour "Most Outstanding"; 2012–2014	Succeeded by Larissa França (BRA)
Preceded by Inaugural	Women's FIVB World Tour "Sportsperson"; 2005–2008	Succeeded by Shelda Bede (BRA)
Preceded by Juliana Silva (BRA)	Women's FIVB World Tour "Sportsperson"; 2012	Succeeded by Taiana Lima (BRA)
