= USC Physical Education building =

Basketball venue in Los Angeles, California

Coordinates: 34°1′17″N 118°17′11″W

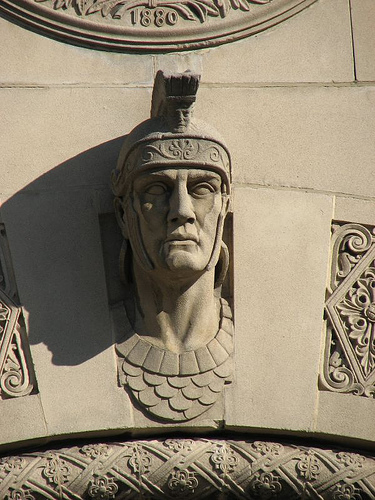
Trojan – USC Physical Education building

The Physical Education building is the University of Southern California's oldest on-campus athletic building. It is home to the 1,000-seat North Gym as well as the campus's first indoor swimming facilities.

The North Gym was the USC Trojans men's volleyball and USC Trojans women's volleyball teams' home court from 1970 until 1988. From 1989 to 2006, the North Gym and the Lyon Center split time as the teams' home courts. In 2007, the teams moved to the Galen Center, but use the old venues if the Galen Center is reserved for other events.

Until 2006, the Trojans basketball and volleyball teams held practice in the North Gym.

The Physical Education building is home to USC's Air Force, Army, and Navy ROTC programs, and has been used as a filming location for many films, including Love & Basketball and Swimfan.
