= USC Trojans women's volleyball =

American college volleyball team

- University: University of Southern California
- Athletic director: Jennifer Cohen
- Head coach: Brad Keller (7th season)
- Conference: Big Ten
- Location: Los Angeles, California, US
- Home arena: Galen Center (capacity: 10,258)
- Nickname: Women of Troy
- Colors: Cardinal and gold

AIAW/NCAA tournament champion
- 1976, 1977, 1980, 1981, 2002, 2003

AIAW/NCAA tournament runner-up
- 1982

AIAW/NCAA tournament semifinal
- 1981, 1982, 1985, 2000, 2002, 2003, 2004, 2007, 2010, 2011

AIAW/NCAA tournament appearance
- 1981, 1982, 1983, 1984, 1985, 1987, 1988, 1989, 1991, 1992, 1993, 1995, 1996, 1997, 1998, 1999, 2000, 2001, 2002, 2003, 2004, 2005, 2006, 2007, 2008, 2009, 2010, 2011, 2012, 2013, 2014, 2015, 2016, 2017, 2018, 2019, 2022, 2023, 2024, 2025

Conference regular season champion
- 2000, 2002, 2003, 2011, 2015

The USC Trojans women's volleyball team is that is coached by Brad Keller, who was named to the position on February 20, 2020.

Under the last coach, Mick Haley, USC became the first repeat NCAA Volleyball National Champion to go undefeated, as they finished off 2003 with a record of 35–0 while becoming the first school in NCAA history to stay at number one in the coaches poll every week.

== History ==
The program began in 1976. The first coach, Chuck Erbe, led the team to four national championships, 1 NCAA (1981) and three AIAW (1976–77, 1980).

Women's volleyball also has to date 10 final four appearances (1981, 1982, 1985, 2000, 2002, 2003, 2004, 2007, 2010, 2011), finishing as the National runner-up in 1982.

More recently, USC sent three female volleyball athletes to the 2008 Olympics – 2004 graduate Nicole Davis represented the indoor United States team, earning a silver medal. 2008 graduate Asia Kaczor represented her native Poland for indoor play, while 2006 alum Bibiana Candelas teamed up with Mayra García in beach volleyball, representing her native country, Mexico.

== Year by year highlights ==
=== 1981 ===
1981 was the first year the NCAA started sponsoring women's volleyball. USC, with a 26–10 record, defeated favored UCLA at Pauley Pavilion to win the first NCAA volleyball championship in NCAA history.

=== 2002–04 ===
USC won the program's second NCAA championship by defeating No. 2 and defending national champion Stanford 3–1. Keao Burdine was named the Most Outstanding Player.

In 2003, USC repeated as national champions. With a 35–0 record, the Women of Troy became the first repeat champion to go undefeated. USC defeated Florida 3–1 in the final.

In 2004, USC made its third consecutive final four, by upsetting No. 1 Nebraska in the regional final. In the national semifinals, the Women of Troy lost to No. 4 seeded Minnesota, the eventual national runners-up.

USC is the only school in the history of the AVCA Showcase tournament to win back-to-back AVCA Showcase titles, as the Women of Troy won in 2003 by defeating Hawaiʻi and 2004 by defeating Minnesota.

=== 2007 ===
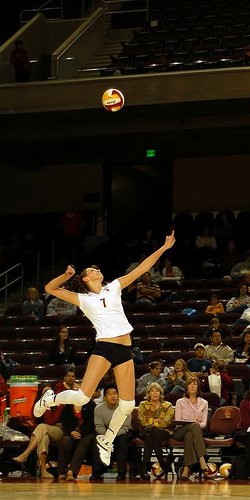
Joanna Kaczor serving the ball in 2007.

USC made its first final four since 2004, upsetting fourth-seeded Texas in the regional final. In the national semifinal, the Women of Troy nearly defeated top-seeded and eventual national runner-up Stanford, even having match point, but ended up losing the fifth set in extra points, 16–14. During the regular season, USC had beaten the Cardinal once.

=== 2010 ===
Starting the season ranked tenth nationally, the Women of Troy compiled a 25–4 regular-season record, the eighth 25-win season in coach Haley's 10-year tenure. Notably, in the regular season USC recorded a sweep of crosstown rival UCLA in conference play, including a 3–2 margin in the last match before postseason play, avenging losses in both 2009 matches.

The Women of Troy dropped just one set through the first three rounds of the NCAA tournament before facing Stanford in the quarterfinal. Though the Cardinal had defeated USC in both regular-season matches, the Women of Troy edged Stanford in a five-setter, led by Falyn Fonoimoana's season-high 25 kills. It was USC's first win against Stanford in seven tries dating to 2007.

Despite having won both regular season matches against Cal, the Women of Troy hit a season low .107 as a team—including a negative hitting percentage in the first set—and were swept, 3–0, in the semifinal. USC finished 29–5 on the season.

== Venues ==
The North Gym, located in the USC Physical Education Building, was the team's home court from 1976 until 1988. From 1989 to 2006, the North Gym and the Lyon Center split time as the team's home court. In 2007, the team moved to the Galen Center as its home court, but uses the old venues if the Galen Center is reserved for other events.

== Notable players ==
- Bibiana Candelas – 2008 beach volleyball Olympian
- Nicole Davis – 2008 and 2012 indoor volleyball Olympian
- Falyn Fonoimoana – professional indoor and beach volleyball player
- Debbie Green-Vargas, – 1984 indoor volleyball Olympian, highly regarded as the greatest women's volleyball setter in USA volleyball history.
- Joanna Kaczor – 2008 indoor volleyball Olympian
- Jennifer Kessy – 2012 Olympic silver medalist in beach volleyball
- Khalia Lanier – Professional volleyball player
- Cindy Marina – Miss Universe Albania 2019 and member of the Albania women's national volleyball team
- April Ross – 2012 Olympic silver medalist in beach volleyball, 2016 Olympic bronze medalist in beach volleyball 2020 Olympic gold medalist in beach volleyball
- Geena Urango – Professional beach volleyball player
- Paula Weishoff – 1984, 1992, and 1996 indoor volleyball Olympian
- Susan Woodstra – 1984 indoor volleyball Olympian, assistant coach for the 2008 Olympics.

== See also ==
- List of NCAA Division I women's volleyball programs
