= Brad Keller (volleyball) =

Volleyball coach (born 1979)

Current position
- Title: Head coach

Biographical details
- Born: December 30, 1979 (age 46)
- Education: Loyola Marymount University, 2002

Playing career
- 1998-2002: LMU

Coaching career (HC unless noted)
- 2007-2010: USC (men) (assistant coach)
- 2011: UC Irvine (men) (assistant coach)
- 2011: UConn (women) (assistant coach)
- 2013-2018: UCLA (men) (assistant coach)
- 2019: UCLA (women) (Associate Coach)

Head coaching record
- Tournaments: 4-4

Brad Keller (born December 30, 1979) is a volleyball coach and former player. He was most recently the head coach at the University of Southern California women's volleyball team. Keller has also been an assistant coach for the USC men's volleyball, UC Irvine men's volleyball, UConn women's volleyball, UCLA men's volleyball. He was also an associate head coach for the UCLA women's volleyball for the 2019 season.

== Personal ==
Brad Keller grew up in Northern California, having graduated from Bellarmine College Prep. He has a younger brother, Jarod, who played libero for Stanford (2006-2009).

== College playing career ==
Keller played at Loyola Marymount University for the 1999 and 2000 seasons before the school dropped the program. Keller graduate from LMU in 2002 with a bachelor's degree in graphic design with a minor in marketing.

== Before college coaching ==
Keller was the owner, director, and a coach of Bay to Bay, a boys’ volleyball club in Northern California, from 2000 to 2006. His club won a pair of silver medals at the Junior Olympics and produced numerous NCAA Division I student-athletes.

== Coaching career ==
Brad Keller got his collegiate coaching start with the men's volleyball team at USC. He coached the Trojans for four seasons that included a run to the 2009 NCAA Tournament Finals. He coached two All-Americans during his first tenure with the Trojans. In 2011, he coached both the UC Irvine men's volleyball program and UConn women's volleyball program. At UC Irvine, he would coach under John Speraw, a head coach that he would coach under for another six years with UCLA men's volleyball team.

With the UCLA men's volleyball team, Keller helped guide the Bruins to a 2016 NCAA Tournament Semifinals appearance and 2018 NCAA Tournament Finals appearance. In January 2019, Keller moved down the hall at the Morgan Center, and became the associate head coach for the UCLA women's volleyball team. Keller helped bring in four top-ranked recruiting classes, and ten Bruins were named All-Americans during his tenure in Westwood.

On February 20, Keller was named the head coach for the USC women's volleyball team after Brent Crouch left USC to take the Auburn women's volleyball head coaching position.

Keller took a leave of absence from coaching the USC team on October 5, 2026. On November 13, 2026 the school announced that they had parted ways with Keller.

Year	School	Conference	Gender	Role	Record	Finish
2007	USC	MPSF	Men	Assistant	13-20	MPSF Tournament Play-In
2008	USC	MPSF	Men	Assistant	15-20	
2009	USC	MPSF	Men	Assistant	21-12	NCAA Finals
2010	USC	MPSF	Men	Assistant	21-15	
2011	UC Irvine	MPSF	Men	Assistant	19-12	MPSF Semifinals
2011 (Note: NCAA women's volleyball is played during the fall, while men's volleyball is played during the spring, so Keller coached both the UC Irvine men's volleyball team and UConn women's volleyball team in 2012.)	UConn	Big East	Women	Assistant	14-15	
2013 (Note: Keller coached the Santa Clara women's volleyball team in the spring 2012, but never coached them during their playing season. He resigned during the summer of 2012 to take an assistant coaching position with the UCLA men's volleyball.)	UCLA	MPSF	Men	Assistant	20-11	MPSF Semifinals
2014	UCLA	MPSF	Men	Assistant	18-11	MPSF Quarterfinals
2015	UCLA	MPSF	Men	Assistant	13-14	MPSF Quarterfinals
2016	UCLA	MPSF	Men	Assistant	25-7	NCAA Tournament Semifinals
2017	UCLA	MPSF	Men	Assistant	17-10	MPSF Quarterfinals
2018	UCLA	MPSF	Men	Assistant	26-8	NCAA Tournament Finals
2019 (Note: Keller started the 2019 year with the men's volleyball team but moved to the women's team to accept an associate head coaching position.)	UCLA	Pac-12	Women	Associate	19-12	NCAA Tournament Second Round
Total					241-167	
