= Butch May =

American volleyball player (Robert Stanley May, Jr.; born 1941)

Personal information
- Full name: Robert Stanley May, Jr.
- Born: November 7, 1941 (age 84) Honolulu, Hawaii, U.S.

Sport
- Sport: Volleyball

Robert Stanley "Butch" May, Jr. (born November 7, 1941) is an American former volleyball player who competed in the 1968 Summer Olympics, as well as being father to multiple Olympic gold medal American beach volleyball player, Misty May-Treanor. Butch grew up in Honolulu, Hawaiʻi and attended St. Louis School, a private school for boys.
