= Cassie Busse =

American volleyball player (born 1982)

Personal information
- Nationality: American
- Born: January 15, 1982 (age 44)
- Height: 6 ft 3 in (190 cm)
- Weight: 181 lb (82 kg)
- Spike: 122 in (310 cm)
- Block: 117 in (298 cm)

Volleyball information
- Number: 18 (national team)

National team
| 2007 | United States |

Cassie Busse (born January 15, 1982) is a retired American female volleyball player. She was part of the United States women's national volleyball team.

She participated at the 2007 Pan American Games.
