= Misty May-Treanor =

American beach volleyball player (born 1977)

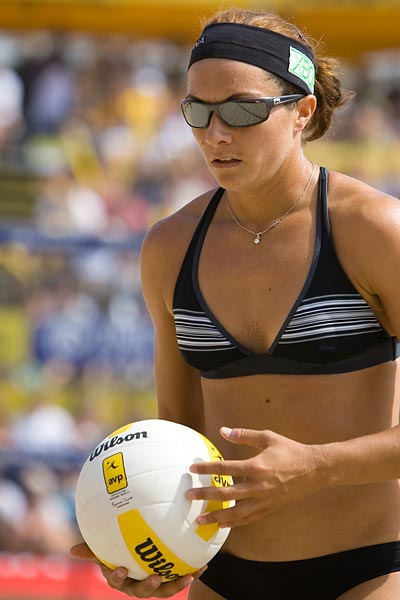
- May-Treanor preparing to serve during a tournament in 2007

Personal information
- Full name: Misty Elizabeth May-Treanor
- Nationality: American
- Born: July 30, 1977 (age 49); Los Angeles, California, U.S.
- Height: 5 ft 9 in (175 cm)
- Weight: 159 lb (72 kg)
- Education: Long Beach State

Beach volleyball information
Years	Teammate
2011–2012; 2001–2009; 1999–2000	Kerri Walsh Jennings; Kerri Walsh Jennings; Holly McPeak
Medal record
Representing the United States
Women's beach volleyball
Olympic Games
Gold medal – first place	2004 Athens	Beach
Gold medal – first place	2008 Beijing	Beach
Gold medal – first place	2012 London	Beach
World Championships
Gold medal – first place	2003 Rio de Janeiro	Beach
Gold medal – first place	2005 Berlin	Beach
Gold medal – first place	2007 Gstaad	Beach
Silver medal – second place	2011 Rome	Beach
World Tour
Gold medal – first place	2002 Madrid	Beach
Gold medal – first place	2002 Gstaad	Beach
Gold medal – first place	2002 Montreal	Beach
Gold medal – first place	2002 Klagenfurt	Beach
Gold medal – first place	2002 Maoming	Beach
Gold medal – first place	2003 Gstaad	Beach
Gold medal – first place	2003 Marseille	Beach
Gold medal – first place	2003 Klagenfurt	Beach
Gold medal – first place	2003 Carson	Beach
Gold medal – first place	2004 Fortaleza	Beach
Gold medal – first place	2004 Rhodes	Beach
Gold medal – first place	2004 Gstaad	Beach
Gold medal – first place	2005 Portugal	Beach
Gold medal – first place	2005 Paris	Beach
Gold medal – first place	2005 Klagenfurt	Beach
Gold medal – first place	2005 Brazil	Beach
Gold medal – first place	2005 South Africa	Beach
Gold medal – first place	2006 Greece	Beach
Gold medal – first place	2006 Gstaad	Beach
Gold medal – first place	2006 Mexico	Beach
Gold medal – first place	2007 Paris	Beach
Gold medal – first place	2007 Montreal	Beach
Gold medal – first place	2007 Berlin	Beach
Gold medal – first place	2007 Klagenfurt	Beach
Gold medal – first place	2007 Brazil	Beach
Gold medal – first place	2007 Phuket	Beach
Gold medal – first place	2008 Berlin	Beach
Gold medal – first place	2008 Paris	Beach
Gold medal – first place	2008 Stavanger	Beach
Gold medal – first place	2011 Beijing	Beach
Gold medal – first place	2011 Moscow	Beach
Gold medal – first place	2011 Klagenfurt	Beach
Gold medal – first place	2012 Gstaad	Beach
Silver medal – second place	2002 Marseille	Beach
Silver medal – second place	2002 Mallorca	Beach
Silver medal – second place	2002 Vitória	Beach
Silver medal – second place	2003 Stavanger	Beach
Silver medal – second place	2005 Acapulco	Beach
Silver medal – second place	2006 Italy	Beach
Silver medal – second place	2006 Paris	Beach
Silver medal – second place	2011 Brasília	Beach
Silver medal – second place	2011 PAF	Beach
Silver medal – second place	2011 The Hague	Beach
Silver medal – second place	2012 Moscow	Beach
Bronze medal – third place	2002 Osaka	Beach
Bronze medal – third place	2003 Rhodes	Beach
Bronze medal – third place	2006 Brazil	Beach
Bronze medal – third place	2006 Thailand	Beach
Bronze medal – third place	2007 Stavanger	Beach
Bronze medal – third place	2010 Stavanger	Beach
Women's volleyball
Pan American Games
Bronze medal – third place	1999 Winnipeg	Indoor

Misty Elizabeth May-Treanor (/ˈtreɪnər/; née May; born July 30, 1977) is an American retired professional beach volleyball player. She is a three-time Olympic gold medalist, and the second most successful female beach volleyball player as of January 2026, having won 112 tournaments in domestic and international competition.

May-Treanor and teammate Kerri Walsh Jennings were gold medalists in beach volleyball at the 2004, 2008 and 2012 Summer Olympics. They also won the FIVB Beach Volleyball World Championships in 2003, 2005 and 2007. The pair set various records throughout their partnership, including a win streak of 112 consecutive matches (19 consecutive tournament titles) in 2007–2008, breaking their own previous record of 89 consecutive match wins. They have been called "the greatest beach volleyball team of all time."

May-Treanor retired from competitive play on August 8, 2012, after she and Walsh Jennings won gold in the 2012 Summer Olympics. She was inducted into the Volleyball Hall of Fame in 2016.

== Early life and education ==
May was born in 1977 in Los Angeles to Barbara (née Grubb), a nationally ranked tennis player, and Butch May, a member of the 1968 United States men's national volleyball team. She has two older half brothers, Brack and Scott. She grew up playing beach volleyball with her parents at the Santa Monica Pier, and at age 8 teamed with her father to play in her first beach volleyball tournament. May also played soccer and tennis, as well as participating in dance. She attended primary school at Brightwood Elementary School in Monterey Park and Roosevelt Elementary School in Santa Monica. As a child, she was baby-sat by Karch Kiraly, future national volleyball player and United States women's national volleyball team head coach.

In her 2010 autobiography, May-Treanor stated both of her parents were alcoholics. She also asserted her mother would at times become violent when drinking. From the age of 4 to 15, she lived with her grandparents. In 1988, her father committed to living his life sober after an automobile accident in which he struck and nearly killed a motorcyclist.

== Education ==
=== High school ===
May grew up in Costa Mesa, California, attending Newport Harbor High School from 1991 through 1995. She helped her team win the state championship in volleyball in both her sophomore and senior years, 1992 and 1994. During her junior year in 1993 she was named the Division I All-CIF team Player of the Year, and the following year she was selected by USA Today as the best high school girls' volleyball player in the nation.

While at Newport Harbor High she also competed in track and field, excelling in the high jump. At the CIF California State Meet in 1993 she finished second in the high jump to future heptathlete, Tracye Lawyer.

May-Treanor was later inducted into the inaugural class of the Newport Harbor High School's Hall of Fame in 2014.

=== College ===
May-Treanor played volleyball for the Long Beach State 49ers from 1995 to 1999. The 1998 team that May captained was the first women's NCAA volleyball team to have an undefeated season. She graduated with a BA in kinesiology and fitness in 2002 and was inducted into the Long Beach State Athletics Hall of Fame in 2004.

During her tenure there, she racked up numerous Big West Conference and NCAA awards and honors, including the Honda Sports Award for the nation's best female volleyball player, and the Honda-Broderick Cup for the best overall female collegiate athlete for 1998–99, and back-to-back National Player of the Year awards in 1997 and 1998.

==== 1998 NCAA championship ====
As the starting setter in 1998, May-Treanor led Long Beach State University to the Division I NCAA Women's Volleyball Championship with a 36–0 record. She shared the NCAA Championship Most Outstanding Player award after setting a tournament record with 20 service aces.

=== Graduate school ===
She attended Concordia University in Irvine, California to earn a master's degree in coaching and athletic administration. Her degree was conferred on May 4, 2013.

== Professional career ==
=== 1999–2000: Early career with Holly McPeak ===
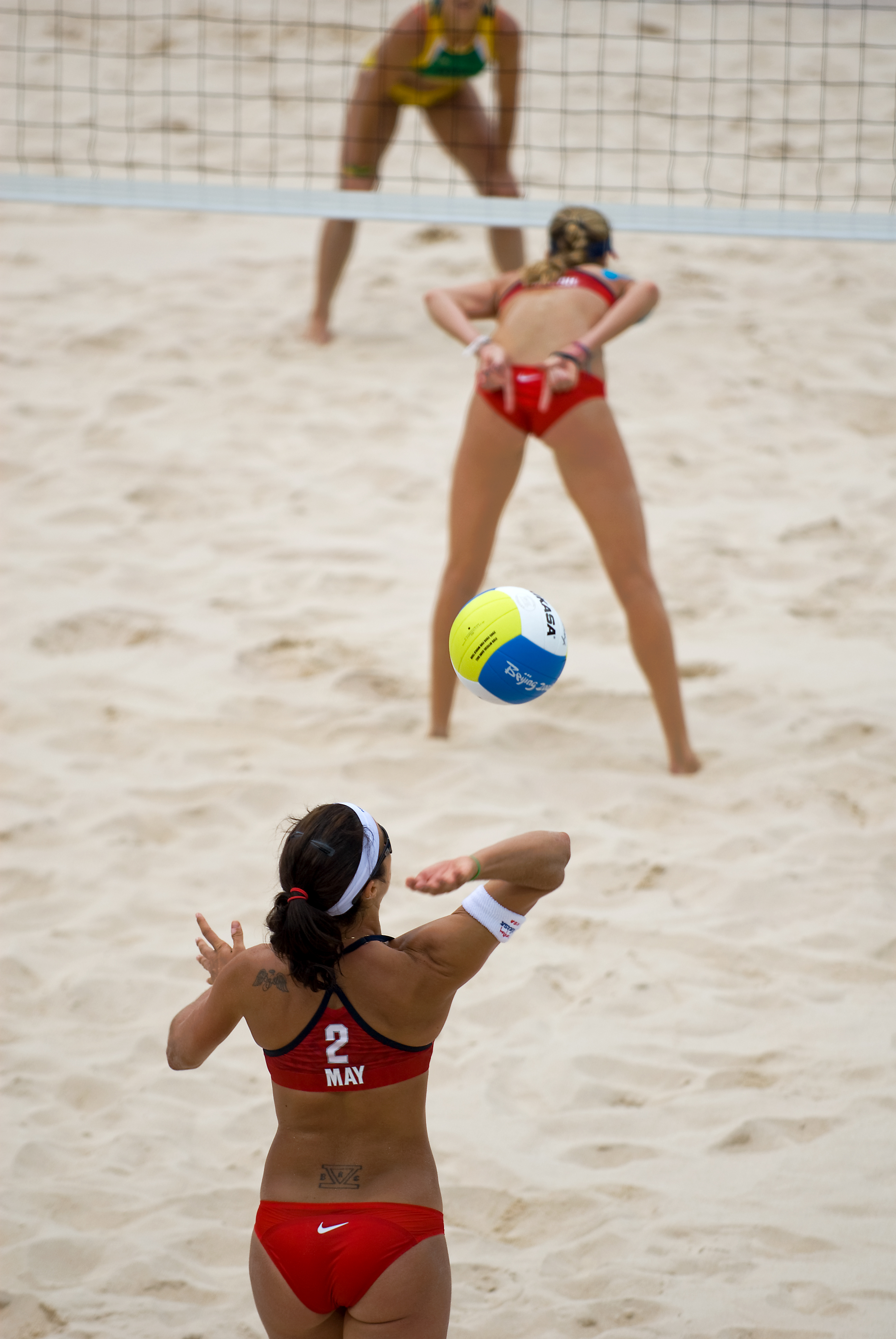
May serves while partner Walsh-Jennings provides defensive signals in 2008

May played her first professional match on the AVP tour in May 1999 while still a college senior. After graduating from Long Beach State in 1999, she joined the United States women's national volleyball team. After a few months she quit the national team to focus on beach volleyball, teaming with Holly McPeak.

The pair played their first tournament together on the FIVB tour in Salvador, Brazil in November 1999. Seeded 22nd, McPeak/May finished 9th.

The 2000 season saw the team of May and McPeak find success, both in domestic and international competitions. They won their first tournament together in April at a USAV event, followed by two wins on the FIVB tour, and one on the now-defunct BVA. May was selected as the BVA Rookie of the Year for 2000. With three FIVB tournament wins and no finishes lower than 5th, the pair qualified for one of the two US Olympic berths, a goal McPeak was looking for when she first partnered with May. At the 2000 Summer Olympics the pair won in the opening round and in the round of 16 before losing 16–14 in a hard-fought quarterfinal match against Sandra Pires and Adriana Samuel of Brazil. The quarterfinal loss left the team in a tie for 5th place at the 2000 summer Olympics.

=== 2001 to Beijing 2008: Dominance with partner Kerri Walsh ===
After completing the 2000 season with McPeak, May teamed up with a new partner Kerri Walsh, playing as a defender behind Walsh's block. Rather than play on the newly reformed AVP tour, the duo spent the 2001 and 2002 seasons gaining valuable experience competing on the international FIVB tour. They won their first FIVB tour championship in 2002. In 2003, May and Walsh signed with the AVP. They received "Team of the Year" honors after having an undefeated domestic season, going 39–0 in match victories with eight tournament wins. On the 2003 international tour, May-Treanor and Walsh went 52–4 in match victories.

For nearly the entire period from their initial partnering in 2001, to their respective hiatuses in late 2008, May-Treanor and Walsh Jennings dominated both the AVP and FIVB beach volleyball tours. At one point, May-Treanor and Walsh Jennings had a win streak of 112 consecutive matches and 19 straight tournaments that lasted from August 2007 to August 2008, breaking their own previous record of 89 consecutive match wins and 15 straight tournaments, set before the 2004 Summer Olympics.

=== After Beijing ===
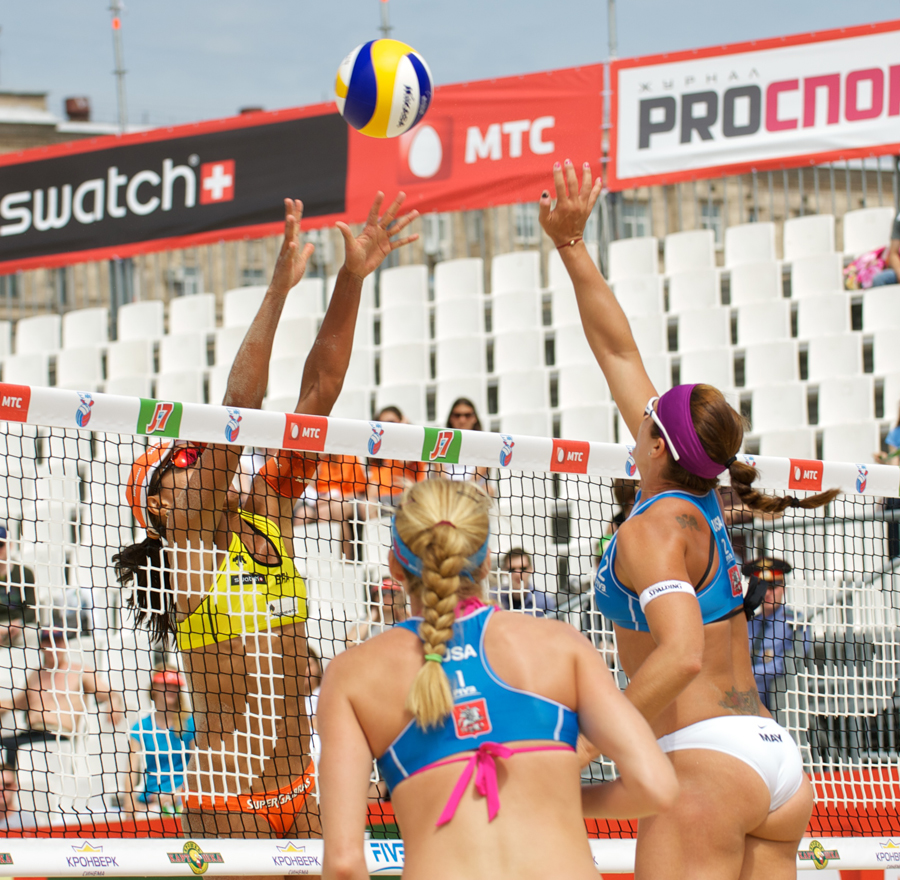
Kerri Walsh Jennings and Misty May-Treanor in 2012

Following their gold medal victory at the Beijing Olympics, May-Treanor and Walsh Jennings returned to the 2008 AVP Tour. Their win streak of 112 matches was broken with an upset victory by fellow 2008 Olympians Nicole Branagh and Elaine Youngs at the AVP Shootout in Cincinnati, Ohio. May-Treanor and Walsh Jennings lost again on September 7, falling to April Ross and Jennifer Kessy in the semifinals of an AVP tournament in Santa Barbara, California, marking the first time since April 2007 that the duo missed reaching an AVP tour final.

For the 2010 season, with Walsh Jennings taking a break from competition for the birth of her second son, May-Treanor teamed up with Branagh. The two won several tournaments together, but struggled for much of the year.

=== Injuries ===
May-Treanor played much of her 2002 season with a torn PCL before undergoing surgery that September.

Soon after winning her gold medal in the 2008 Beijing Olympics, May-Treanor ruptured her achilles tendon during dance practice for a performance on the show Dancing with the Stars. It was successfully repaired, though she did not return to competition for nearly a year.

== Retirement ==
May-Treanor, just prior to teaming with Kerri Walsh Jennings for a third straight gold medal at the 2012 London Olympics, announced that she was retiring from beach volleyball. She confirmed this shortly after the Olympics victory.

== Coaching ==
May-Treanor was a member of the women's volleyball coaching staff at Irvine Valley College beginning in 2001, though she is no longer listed as a staff member. IVC head coach, Tom Pestolesi, was her high school volleyball coach.

As of July 2016, she serves as the Director of Volleyball at Long Beach City College where she coaches the women's indoor and beach volleyball teams. The LBCC indoor and beach teams thrived under her leadership. In the 2016–17 season, the Vikings went 16-5 and won their first conference title in 16 years, also qualifying for the state playoffs where they made it to the second round. For beach, they were successful in their inaugural year, making it to the state finals and having one of the teams win the state title. In the 2017–18 season, the indoor team went 18-5 and again lost in the second round of playoffs.

She also owns a beach volleyball club called Dream in Gold (DIG) to train the next generation of beach volleyball players.

== Olympic history ==
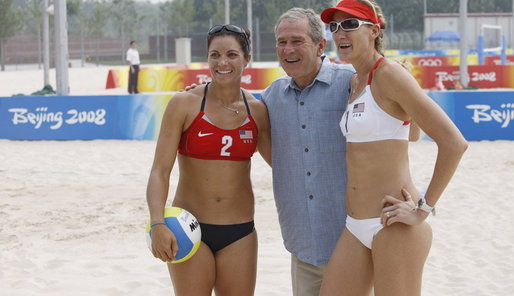
U.S. President George W. Bush visits May-Treanor (left) and Walsh Jennings (right) at the 2008 Olympics.

=== Sydney 2000 ===
Affected by an abdominal injury in her first Olympics, May finished fifth with partner Holly McPeak in the 2000 Sydney Olympics.

=== Athens 2004 ===
Riding a 90-match win streak, May and Walsh continued their winning ways through the 2004 Summer Olympics. In semifinal play, the pair defeated fellow Americans — and May's former partner — Holly McPeak and partner Elaine Youngs. May and Walsh defeated Brazil in the championship match to win the gold medal. The duo did not lose a single set in all seven matches.

=== Beijing 2008 ===
On August 21, May-Treanor and Walsh Jennings repeated as Olympic gold medalists, defeating the first-seeded Chinese team in two games. They are the only beach volleyball team to repeat as gold medalists. May-Treanor was named the Most Outstanding Player for the women's competition.

=== London 2012 ===
May-Treanor and Walsh Jennings competed in the 2012 Summer Olympics in London. In the preliminary round, they extended their Olympic winning streak to 32 consecutive sets without a loss with wins over Australia and the Czech Republic. The streak came to an end when they lost their first set to the Schwaiger sisters from Austria; May-Treanor and Walsh Jennings went on to win the match 17–21, 21–8, 15–10.

May-Treanor and Walsh Jennings defeated fellow Americans April Ross and Jennifer Kessy in the final to claim the gold medal (21–16, 21–16).

== Politics and philanthropy ==
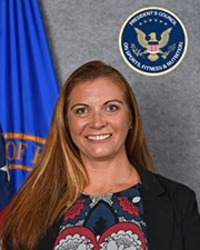
May-Treanor's official portrait as co-chair of the President’s Council on Sports, Fitness and Nutrition.

May-Treanor serves as a Sports Ambassador for Special Olympics Southern California.

== Personal life ==
May began dating professional baseball catcher, Matt Treanor, in January 2004. The two later wed in November of that year. She and her husband reside in Yorba Linda, CA. May-Treanor gave birth to the couple's first child, Malia Barbara, on June 3, 2014. The couple later gave birth to fraternal twin girls, Mele Elizarin and Mia Kanoelani, on November 9, 2017.

Both May-Treanor's maternal aunt, Betty Ann Grubb Stuart, and maternal first cousin, Taylor Dent, were professional tennis players.

In her 2010 memoir, May-Treanor revealed she had been sexually assaulted while in college, pressed charges against her assailant, and testified at the trial.

A tattoo on May-Treanor's shoulder of an angel with the initials "B.M." is a dedication to her mother, Barbara May, who died of cancer in 2002.

== Television and film appearances ==
May-Treanor has made numerous minor television appearances, including Dancing with the Stars, episodes of CSI: Miami, Wizards of Waverly Place, and the Late Show with David Letterman.

In 2008, she competed in season 7 of Dancing with the Stars with partner, Maksim Chmerkovskiy. May-Treanor ruptured her Achilles tendon during a training session for the show, and was consequently forced to withdraw from the competition.

Following the 2008 Olympics, May-Treanor appeared in an episode of the Disney series Wizards of Waverly Place. On August 14, 2012, she appeared on The Daily Show with Jon Stewart.

May-Treanor appeared alongside Jennifer Kessy in the season 9 episode of Hell's Kitchen as chef's table guest in the red kitchen.

== Awards and honors ==
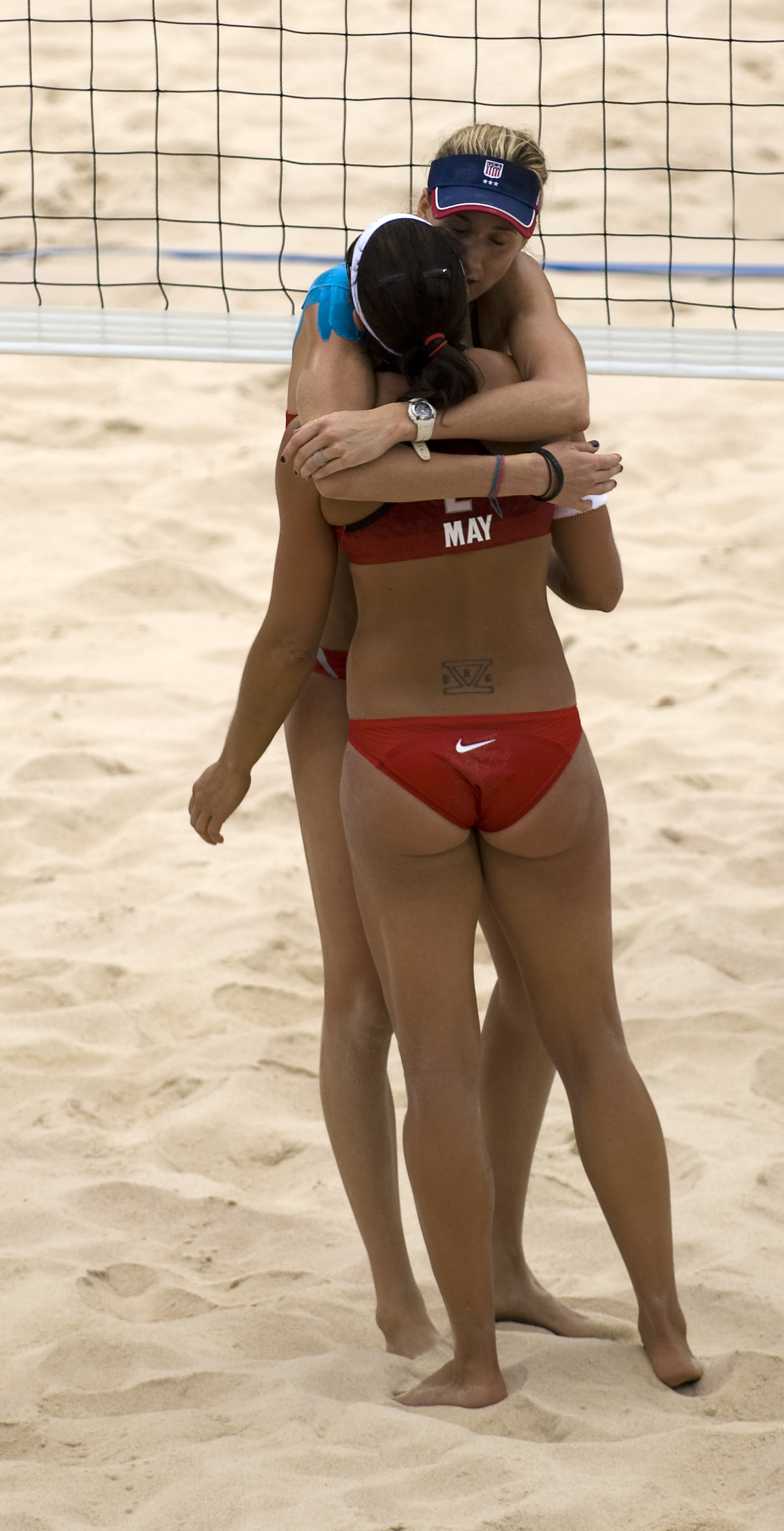
May (face not seen) celebrates with Kerri Walsh Jennings after defeating Brazil in the 2008 Beijing Olympics quarterfinal match

=== College ===
==== Big West Conference ====
May-Treanor's honors in the Big West Conference include:

- Big West Conference Freshman of the Year 1995
- All-Big West First Team (4): 1995–1998
- Big West Player of the Year (3): 1996–1998
- Big West Player of the Week – 6 times

==== NCAA ====
- NCAA Division I First Team All-American 1997, 1998
- National Player of the Year 1997, 1998
- Honda Sports Award 1998–99
- Honda-Broderick Cup 1998–99
- NCAA Championship Most Outstanding Player, 1998

=== Professional ===
==== AVP ====
- AVP Best Defensive Player (3): 2006–2008
- AVP Best Offensive Player (5): 2004–2008
- AVP Crocs Cup Champion (3): 2006–2008 (all with Kerri Walsh)
- AVP Most Valuable Player (4): 2005–2008
- AVP Team of the Year (6): 2003–2008 (all with Kerri Walsh)

==== FIVB ====
- FIVB Best Defender (2): 2007–2008
- FIVB Best Attacker (3): 2005, 2007–2008
- FIVB Best Setter (1): 2005
- FIVB Most Outstanding (2): 2005, 2008
- FIVB Sportsperson (2): 2007, 2008
- FIVB Tour Champion (1): 2002 (with Kerri Walsh)

==== BVA ====
- BVA Rookie of the Year 2000

=== Others ===
==== Olympics ====
- Most Outstanding Player at the 2004/2008 Summer Olympics.

==== Women's Sports Foundation ====
- Sportswoman of the Year Award (2): 2004, 2006 (with Kerri Walsh)

==== Hall of Fame ====
May-Treanor has been inducted into the following Halls of Fame:

- Long Beach State Athletics Hall of Fame (2004)
- Newport Harbor High School Hall of Fame (2014)
- International Volleyball Hall of Fame (2016)
- Southern California Indoor Hall of Fame (2017)

== Achievements ==
- Most women's career tournament victories: 112
- Most women's career earnings: $2,132,733
- Most women's international career wins: 43
- Record win streak of 112 consecutive matches and 19 straight tournaments that lasted from August 2007 to August 2008

Sporting positions
Preceded by Adriana Behar and Shelda Bede (BRA)	Women's FIVB Beach World Tour Winner alongside (United States) Kerri Walsh; 2002	Succeeded by Sandra Pires and Ana Paula Connelly (BRA)
Awards
Preceded by Shelda Bede (BRA)	Women's FIVB World Tour "Best Defender"; 2007–2008	Succeeded by Larissa França (BRA)
Preceded by Zhang Xi (CHN)	Women's FIVB World Tour "Best Defender"; 2011	Succeeded by Larissa França (BRA)
Preceded by Inaugural	Women's FIVB World Tour "Best Attacker"; 2005	Succeeded by Juliana Felisberta (BRA)
Preceded by Juliana Felisberta (BRA)	Women's FIVB World Tour "Best Attacker"; 2007–2008	Succeeded by April Ross (USA)
Preceded by Inaugural	Women's FIVB World Tour "Best Setter"; 2005	Succeeded by Larissa França (BRA)
Preceded by Kerri Walsh Jennings (USA)	Women's FIVB World Tour "Most Inspirational" alongside (United States) Kerri Walsh Jennings; 2012	Succeeded by Laura Ludwig (GER)
Preceded by Inaugural	Women's FIVB World Tour "Most Outstanding"; 2005	Succeeded by Larissa França (BRA)
Preceded by Kerri Walsh Jennings (USA)	Women's FIVB World Tour "Most Outstanding" alongside (China) Zhang Xi; 2008	Succeeded by Juliana Felisberta (BRA)
Preceded by Kerri Walsh Jennings (USA)	Women's FIVB World Tour "Sportsperson" alongside (United States) Kerri Walsh Jennings; 2007–2008	Succeeded by Shelda Bede (BRA)
Preceded by Shelda Bede (BRA)	Women's FIVB World Tour "Sportsperson"; 2010	Succeeded by Juliana Felisberta (BRA)
