= Brasília Open (beach volleyball) =

Brasília Open is a beach volleyball event that is part of the Swatch FIVB World Tour. It happens annually in Brasília, Brazil.

== 2011 Tournament ==
=== Gold medal Match (Men) ===
Date		Score		Set 1	Set 2	Set 3
26 Apr	Rogers–Dalhausser (United States)	2–0	(Brazil) Emanuel–Alison	21–18	21–13	
