= April Ross =

American beach volleyball player (born 1982)

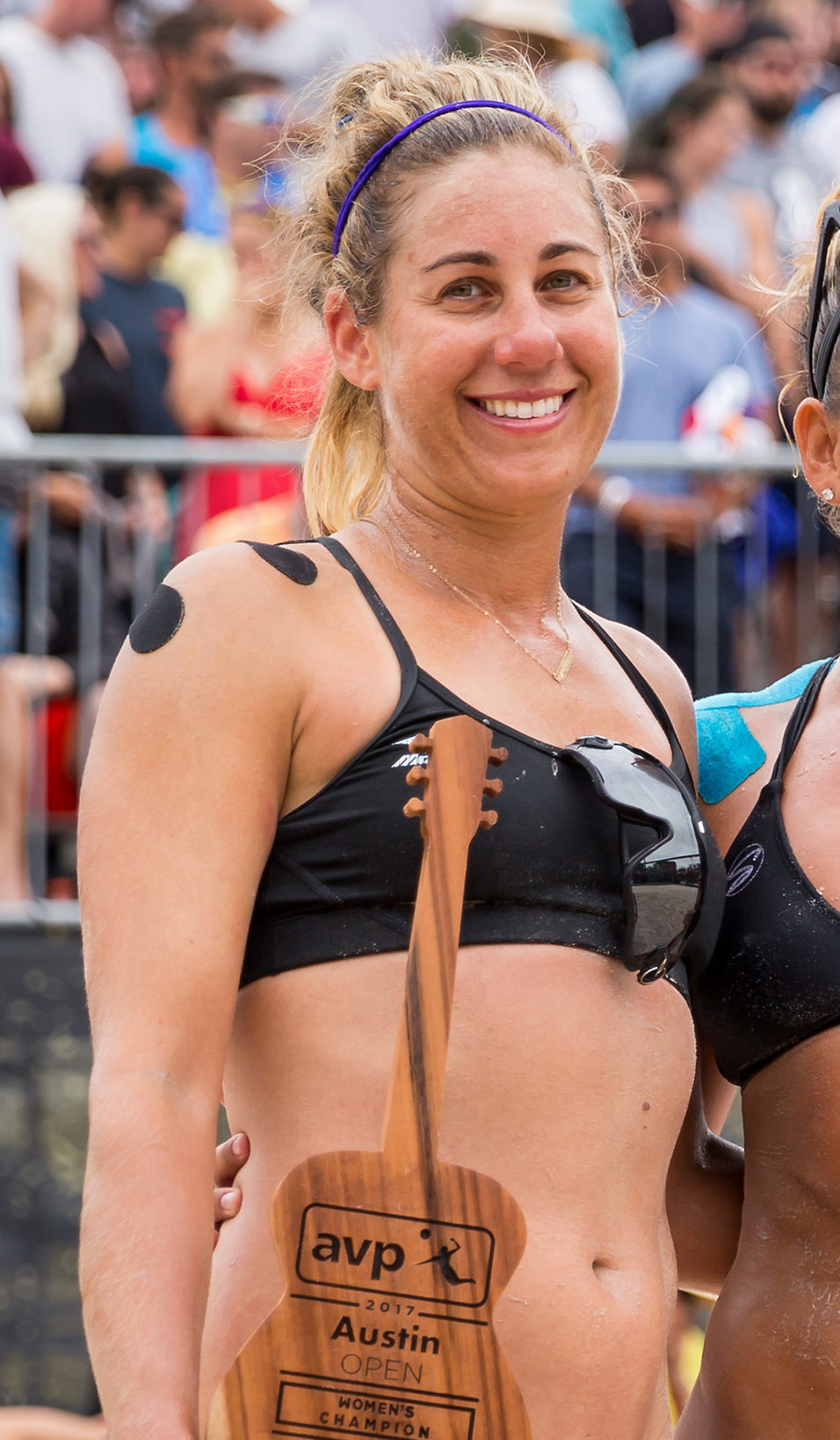
- Ross at the 2017 AVP Austin Open

Personal information
- Full name: April Elizabeth Ross
- Nickname: Ross The Boss
- Born: June 20, 1982 (age 44) Costa Mesa, California, U.S.
- Home town: Newport Beach, California, U.S.
- Education: USC
- Height: 1.85 m (6 ft 1 in)
- Weight: 76 kg (168 lb)
Beach volleyball information
Current teammate
- Years: Teammate
- 2024: Alix Klineman
Previous teammates
- Years: Teammate
- 2018–2021, 2024 2017 2013–2017 2007–2013 2006 2006 2006: Alix Klineman; Lauren Fendrick; Kerri Walsh Jennings; Jennifer Kessy; Keao Burdine; Barbra Fontana; Nancy Mason
Medal record
Women's beach volleyball
Representing the United States
Olympic Games
Gold medal – first place	2020 Tokyo	Beach
Silver medal – second place	2012 London	Beach
Bronze medal – third place	2016 Rio de Janeiro	Beach
World Championships
Gold medal – first place	2009 Stavanger	Beach
Silver medal – second place	2017 Vienna	Beach
Silver medal – second place	2019 Hamburg	Beach
World Tour Finals
Bronze medal – third place	2021 Cagliari	Beach
World Tour
Gold medal – first place	2007 Stavanger	Beach
Gold medal – first place	2008 Phuket	Beach
Gold medal – first place	2008 Sanya	Beach
Gold medal – first place	2009 Marseille	Beach
Gold medal – first place	2009 Phuket	Beach
Gold medal – first place	2010 Shanghai	Beach
Gold medal – first place	2010 Rome	Beach
Gold medal – first place	2011 Stavanger	Beach
Gold medal – first place	2012 Bangsaen	Beach
Gold medal – first place	2013 São Paulo	Beach
Gold medal – first place	2013 Xiamen	Beach
Gold medal – first place	2014 Fuzhou	Beach
Gold medal – first place	2014 Moscow	Beach
Gold medal – first place	2014 Stavanger	Beach
Gold medal – first place	2014 Long Beach	Beach
Gold medal – first place	2016 Rio de Janeiro	Beach
Gold medal – first place	2016 Fuzhou	Beach
Gold medal – first place	2016 Cincinnati	Beach
Gold medal – first place	2016 Moscow	Beach
Gold medal – first place	2016 Long Beach	Beach
Gold medal – first place	2018 The Hague	Beach
Gold medal – first place	2019 Yangzhou	Beach
Gold medal – first place	2019 Itapema	Beach
Gold medal – first place	2019 Gstaad	Beach
Gold medal – first place	2021 Doha	Beach
Silver medal – second place	2007 St. Petersburg	Beach
Silver medal – second place	2008 Dubai	Beach
Silver medal – second place	2009 Brasil	Beach
Silver medal – second place	2009 Seoul	Beach
Silver medal – second place	2009 PAF	Beach
Silver medal – second place	2009 Sanya	Beach
Silver medal – second place	2010 Moscow	Beach
Silver medal – second place	2011 Shanghai	Beach
Silver medal – second place	2011 Stare Jabłonki	Beach
Silver medal – second place	2011 Phuket	Beach
Silver medal – second place	2013 Rome	Beach
Silver medal – second place	2015 Long Beach	Beach
Silver medal – second place	2016 Vitória	Beach
Silver medal – second place	2016 Gstaad	Beach
Silver medal – second place	2019 Tokyo	Beach
Bronze medal – third place	2008 Stavanger	Beach
Bronze medal – third place	2009 Klagenfurt	Beach
Bronze medal – third place	2009 Barcelona	Beach
Bronze medal – third place	2010 Seoul	Beach
Bronze medal – third place	2010 Sanya	Beach
Bronze medal – third place	2011 Brasília	Beach
Bronze medal – third place	2011 Myslowice	Beach
Bronze medal – third place	2011 Beijing	Beach
Bronze medal – third place	2012 Rome	Beach
Bronze medal – third place	2015 Fuzhou	Beach
Bronze medal – third place	2016 Xiamen	Beach
Bronze medal – third place	2021 Cancún	Beach
Bronze medal – third place	2021 Cancún	Beach

April Elizabeth Ross (born June 20, 1982) is a former American beach volleyball player and three-time Olympic medalist. She won a silver medal at the 2012 Summer Olympics with Jennifer Kessy, a bronze medal at the 2016 Summer Olympics with Kerri Walsh Jennings, and a gold medal at the 2020 Summer Olympics with Alix Klineman. Ross and Kessy were also the 2009 Beach Volleyball World Champions.

== Early life ==
Ross grew up in Newport Beach, California, where she attended Newport Harbor High School. There she played volleyball and basketball with fellow 2012 Olympian Esther Lofgren. At NHHS, in addition to lettering in track, she was a star indoor volleyball player, eventually becoming the nation's top recruit for her graduating class. She won the Gatorade National Player of the Year award as a senior and was the California Interscholastic Federation (CIF) Player of the Year in 1998 and 1999. In her senior season, she notched 624 kills and 526 digs. She played club volleyball for Orange County Volleyball Club for five years. She also played on the U.S. Junior National Team. She is 6 ft 1 in (1.85 m) tall.

== Personal life ==
April is the daughter of Glen and Margie Ross, and has a sister - Amy Ross Marshall. She is married to Josh Riley.

Riley proposed in February 2022 while the couple was enjoying a spa and wine tasting weekend in Temecula, CA. They welcomed their son on October 25, 2023. On September 14, 2024, Ross married Josh Riley at the Shade Hotel in Manhattan Beach, CA. Their 10 month old son Ross served as a ring bearer and April's sister was her maid of honor.

== College ==
Ross played indoor volleyball during her collegiate career, where she attended the University of Southern California in Los Angeles. In her freshman season she was the Pac-10 Freshman of the Year as well as the National Freshman of the Year. Additionally, she received Pac-10 First Team honors as well as AVCA Second Team All-America honors. She helped USC to the NCAA Final Four.

As a sophomore in 2001, she was a second team All American and finished the season ranked fourth in Pac-10 in kills (3.98 kpg), sixth in points (4.52 ppg) and seventh in digs (3.04 dpg) and helped USC to the NCAA Regional Finals, when she suffered a sprained ankle during game two and was forced to leave the match.

In her final two seasons, she helped USC to back-to-back NCAA Titles. In 2002, she was named a First Team All-American and had 15 kills and 14 digs in the NCAA Championship win over Stanford, avenging their only loss of the season to the Cardinal. In 2003, she repeated as a First Team All-American, and helped USC to an undefeated season after defeating Florida in the NCAA championship match. Ross had 14 kills and 19 digs in the winning effort.

She finished her career among USC's all-time career record-holders, ranking in the top 6 in eight statistical categories, including first in points (1,430) and points per game, second in service aces (161) and service aces per game (0.38), fourth in attacks (3,859), fifth in kills (1576), kills per game (3.73) and digs (1,296) and sixth in digs per game (3.06).

In 2004, she won the Honda Sports Award as the nation's top female collegiate volleyball player.

== Career ==
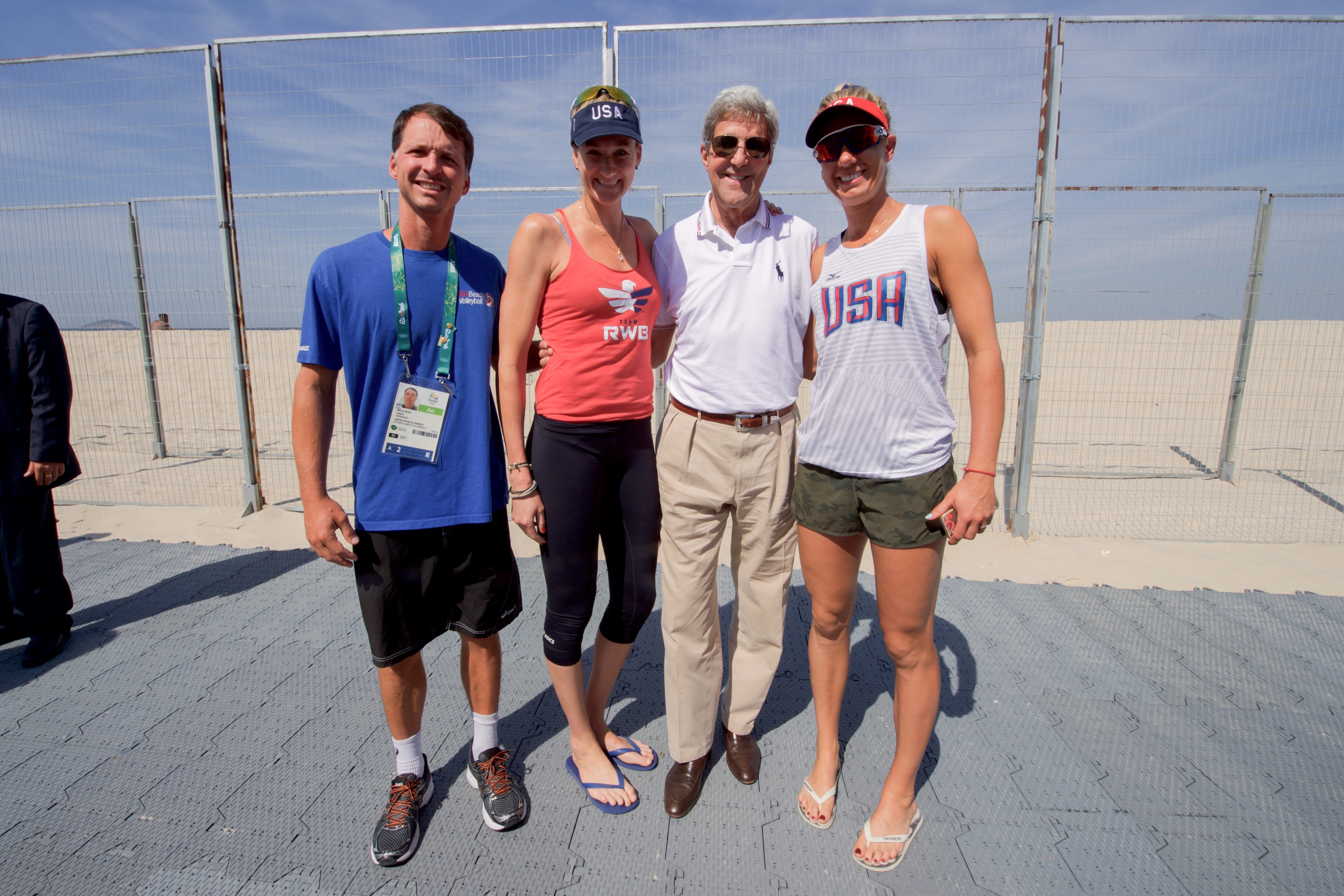
Ross with Kerri Walsh Jennings and John Kerry

=== Professional career ===
In 2008, with her beach partner Jennifer Kessy during the Swatch FIVB World Tour 2008, they finished in third place at the ConocoPhillips Grand Slam Stavanger, second place at the Dubai Open and first place at the Phuket Thailand Open, where she was named the Most Outstanding Player. On September 7, 2008, Ross and Kessy upset the World No. 1 duo of Misty May-Treanor and Kerri Walsh at an AVP tournament in Santa Barbara, California. On July 4, 2009, Kessy and Ross won the FIVB World Championships in Stavanger, Norway defeating Brazilians Juliana Felisberta Silva and Larissa Franca. As of April 2012, Ross had eight AVP and nine FIVB 1st-place finishes overall, as well as over $937,813 in total prize money.

=== World tour 2016 ===
Ross played, with partner Walsh Jennings, at the Long Beach, California Grand Slam, which was part of the FIVB Beach Volleyball World Tour. They won the gold medal in straight sets (21–16, 21–16).

=== Partnering with Klineman ===
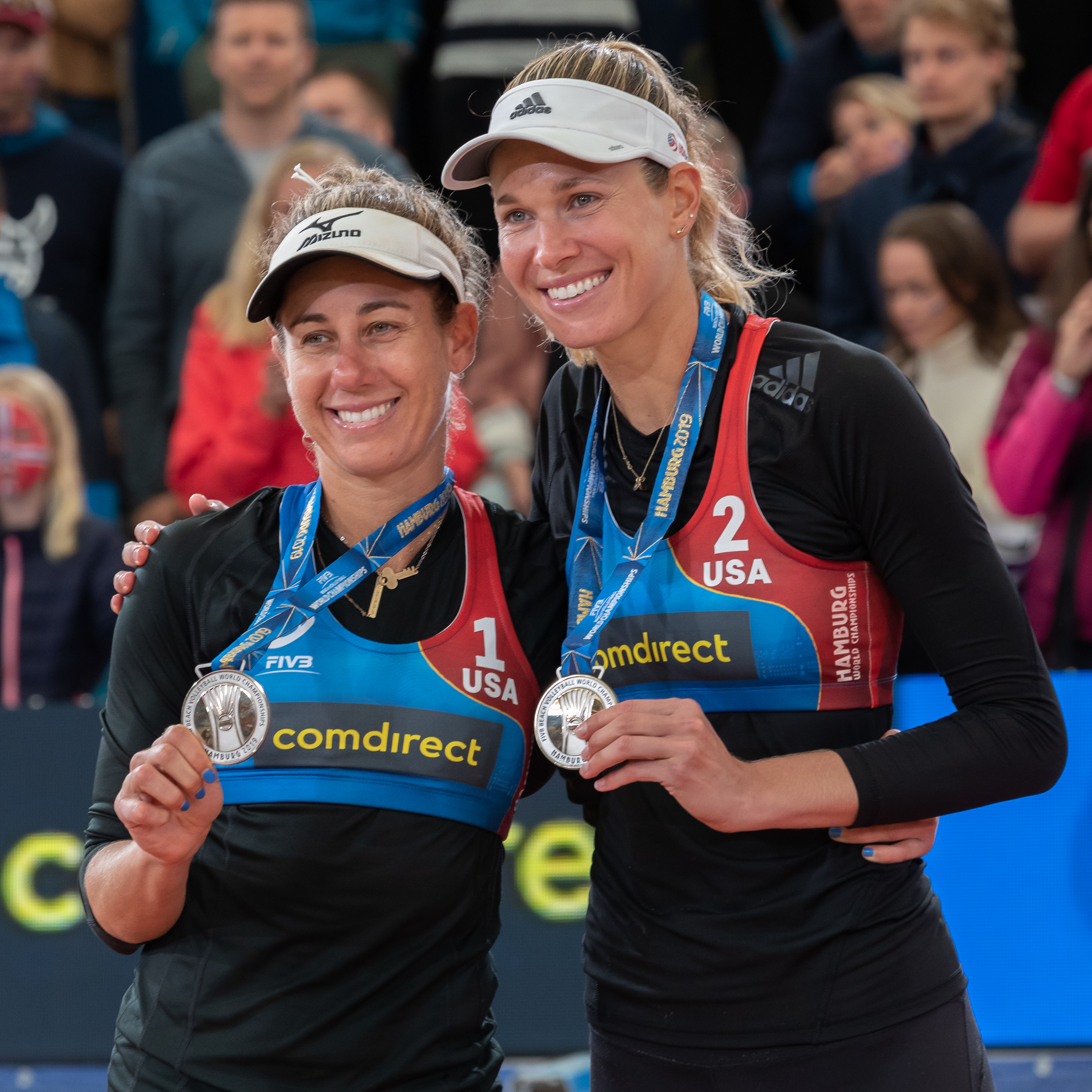
Ross and Alix Klineman (right) in 2019

At the end of 2017, Ross and Alix Klineman became beach volleyball partners. Klineman and Ross won the FIVB Dela Beach Open in January 2018, which was the first tournament they played together. During the 2018 AVP Pro Beach Volleyball Tour, Klineman and Ross won four tournament events: the Austin Open, the Manhattan Beach Open, the Championships (in Chicago), and the Hawaii Invitational. In mid-October 2018, Klineman and Ross won their second FIVB tournament event, earning the gold medal over Brazil at the Yangzhou Open. They were named the AVP Team of the Year at the AVP Award Banquet that November.

In 2019, their success continued as they won the Huntington Beach and New York City Open AVP tour events, and won the FIVB Itapema Open mid-May. They also won the silver medal at the 2019 Beach Volleyball World Championships in Hamburg, Germany.

In July 2020 the two won the AVP Monster Hydro Cup and the Wilson Cup, and in August they won the AVP Champions Cup.

In August 2021, two weeks after winning gold at the Olympics, the pair won the AVP Manhattan Beach Open, their second time winning this tournament together. The two teamed up again for the 2024 AVP season, qualifying for the brand new AVP League via wild card.

=== Olympic career ===
In the 2012 London Olympics, No. 4 seed Ross and Kessy won the Silver Medal by defeating Brazil's No. 1 seed team of Juliana and Larissa in a semi-final match after dropping the first set. They lost to teammates Misty May-Treanor and Kerri Walsh Jennings in the Gold Medal final straight sets by an identical score of 16–21.

On June 26, 2013, Ross teamed up with Walsh-Jennings to train for the 2016 Olympics in Rio de Janeiro. Ross played as a defender behind Walsh Jennings' block. Seeded at No. 3, Ross and Walsh Jennings lost to Brazil's No. 2 seed team of Agatha and Barbara in straight sets of 20–22 and 18–21 in a semi-final match. They defeated the No. 1 seed Brazil team of Larissa and Talita in the Bronze Medal match for Ross's second Olympic medal.

On August 6, 2021, Klineman and Ross captured the gold medal in the 2020 Summer Olympics, after winning in straight sets versus Australia. In the entire tournament, they went undefeated in match play, and only lost one set throughout 7 matches. The win allowed Ross to complete the trifecta of winning an Olympic gold, silver, and bronze medals.

== Awards ==
=== College ===
- Honda Sports Award (2004)

=== FIVB ===
- FIVB Top Rookie: 2007
- FIVB Best Offensive Player (1): 2009
- FIVB Best Hitter: 2009, 2011
- FIVB Best Server: 2011, 2012, 2015–2017

=== AVP ===
- AVP Rookie of the Year: 2006
- AVP Most Improved Player: 2007
- AVP Best Server: 2013–2017
- AVP Best Offensive Player: 2013, 2017
- AVP Most Valuable Player: 2013–2017
- AVP Team of the Year: 2012 (with Jennifer Kessy), 2014, 2016 (with Kerri Walsh Jennings), 2019 (with Alix Klineman).

== Clubs ==
- (Puerto Rico) Leonas de Ponce (2004–2006)
- Orange County Volleyball Club for 5 Years
