= 2024 PVF season =

Inaugural season of the Pro Volleyball Federation

- League: Pro Volleyball Federation
- Sport: Volleyball
- Duration: January 24 – May 19
- Number of games: 24
- Number of teams: 7
- Total attendance: 376,920
- Average attendance: 4,487
- TV partner(s): CBS Sports; Bally Live; Stadium
- Top draft pick: Asjia O'Neal
- Picked by: Columbus Fury
- Season MVP: Leah Edmond (Atlanta)
- Finals champions: Omaha Supernovas
- Runners-up: Grand Rapids Rise
- Finals MVP: Sydney Hilley (Omaha)

Seasons
- 2025 →

The 2024 PVF Season was the inaugural season of the Pro Volleyball Federation (PVF). The Omaha Supernovas won the inaugural championship after defeating the Grand Rapids Rise in the Finals.

== Draft ==
The Columbus Fury were awarded the first pick in the inaugural draft, where they selected Asjia O'Neal from Texas.

2024 Draft
Rnd.	Pick #	Team	Player	Pos.	College	Notes
1	1	Columbus Fury	Asjia O'Neal	Middle blocker	Texas	
1	2	San Diego Mojo	Magda Jehlarova	Middle blocker	Washington State	Traded to Atlanta
1	3	Vegas Thrill	Hannah Pukis	Setter	Oregon	
1	4	Grand Rapids Rise	Morgahn Fingall	Opposite hitter	Tennessee	
1	5	Orlando Valkyries	Paige Briggs	Outside hitter	Western Kentucky	Traded to Omaha
1	6	Atlanta Vibe	Chiamaka Nwokolo	Middle blocker	Pitt	
1	7	Omaha Supernovas	Amber Igiede	Middle blocker	Hawai’i	
2	8	Omaha Supernovas	Jill Gillen	Outside hitter	Arkansas	Traded to Orlando
2	9	Atlanta Vibe	Whitney Bower	Setter	BYU	
2	10	Orlando Valkyries	Georgia Murphy	Libero	Oregon	
2	11	Grand Rapids Rise	Sydney Bolding	Middle blocker	Kansas State	
2	12	Vegas Thrill	Gabby Gonzales	Outside hitter	Oregon	
2	13	San Diego Mojo	Temi Thomas-Ailara	Outside hitter	Wisconsin	
2	14	Columbus Fury	Reagan Cooper	Outside hitter	Kansas	
3	15	Columbus Fury	Kendall Kipp	Opposite hitter	Stanford	
3	16	San Diego Mojo	Morgan Lewis	Opposite hitter	Oregon	
3	17	Vegas Thrill	Kylie Murr	Libero	Minnesota	
3	18	Grand Rapids Rise	Kenna Sauer	Outside hitter	Houston	
3	19	Orlando Valkyries	Azhani Tealer	Middle blocker	Kentucky	
3	20	Atlanta Vibe	Kamaile Hiapo	Libero	BYU	
3	21	Omaha Supernovas	Abby Hansen	Middle blocker	UCF	Traded to Orlando
4	22	Omaha Supernovas	Maggie Cartwright	Opposite hitter	Arkansas	
4	23	Atlanta Vibe	Kara McGhee	Middle blocker	Oregon	
4	24	Omaha Supernovas	Sophie Davis	Middle blocker	James Madison	From Orlando
4	25	Grand Rapids Rise	Emma Clothier	Middle blocker	SMU	
4	26	Vegas Thrill	Hannah Maddux	Outside hitter	South Alabama	
4	27	San Diego Mojo	Karson Bacon	Middle blocker	Oregon	
4	28	Columbus Fury	Jenaisya Moore	Outside hitter	Tennessee	
5	29	Columbus Fury	Emma Monks	Middle blockers	Pitt	
5	30	San Diego Mojo	Zoe Weatherington	Opposite hitter	Penn State	
5	31	Vegas Thrill	Maddie Schermerhorn	Libero	Purdue	
5	32	Grand Rapids Rise	Karly Basham	Libero	Washington State	
5	33	Orlando Valkyries	Kalyah Williams	Opposite hitter	USC	
5	34	Atlanta Vibe	May Pertofsky	Opposite hitter	Washington	

== Teams ==
=== Rosters ===
Atlanta Vibe
No.	Name	Height	Position
1	(United States) Leketor Member-Meneh	5' 7"	Outside hitter
3	(United States) Shelly Fanning	6' 2"	Middle blocker
7	(Russia) Anna Lazareva	6' 3"	Opposite hitter
8	(United States) Kamaile Hiapo	5' 7"	Libero
9	(United States) Morgan Hentz	5' 9"	Libero
13	(United States) Leah Edmond	6' 2"	Outside hitter
14	(United States) Whitney Bower	5' 7"	Setter
15	(Czech Republic) Magdalena Jehlářová	6' 3"	Middle blocker
16	(United States) Karis Watson	6' 2"	Middle blocker
17	(United States) Alli Linnehan	6' 1"	Outside hitter
20	(United States) Grace Cleveland	6' 3"	Opposite hitter
21	(United States) Marlie Monserez	6' 0"	Setter
22	(United States) Yossiana Pressley	6' 1"	Outside hitter
24	(United States) Regan Pittman	6' 5"	Middle blocker
Head Coach:		(United States) Todd Dagenais	

Columbus Fury
No.	Name	Height	Position
1	(United States) Rainelle Jones	6' 3"	Middle blocker
2	(Puerto Rico) Raymariely Santos	6' 0"	Setter
3	(Puerto Rico) Valeria León	5' 6"	Libero
4	(United States) Michelle Bartsch-Hackley	6' 2"	Outside hitter
7	(United States) Asjia O'Neal	6' 3"	Middle blocker
8	(United States) Reagan Cooper	6' 2"	Outside hitter
9	(United States) Samantha Drechsel	6' 4"	Opposite hitter
12	(United States) Tori Dilfer-Stringer	5' 11"	Setter
14	(Montenegro) Nikoleta Perović	6' 1"	Opposite hitter
15	(Puerto Rico) Ivania Ortiz	5' 9"	Outside hitter
16	(United States) Jenna Rosenthal	6' 6"	Middle blocker
17	(United States) Megan Courtney-Lush	6' 1"	Outside hitter
18	(United States) Janaisya Moore	6' 0"	Outside hitter
23	(United States) Kaitlyn Hord	6' 4"	Middle blocker
Head Coach:		(Puerto Rico) Ángel Pérez	

Grand Rapids Rise
No.	Name	Height	Position
4	(United States) Morgahn Fingall	6' 1"	Opposite hitter
5	(United States) Erika Pritchard	6' 3"	Outside hitter
7	(United States) Nia Grant	6' 2"	Middle blocker
8	(United States) Marin Grote	6' 4"	Middle blocker
9	(United States) Claire Chaussee	6' 0"	Outside hitter
10	(United States) Shannon Scully	6' 2"	Outside hitter
12	(United States) Sarah Sponcil	5' 8"	Setter/Libero
13	(United States) Ashley Evans	6' 1"	Setter
14	(Bulgaria) Emiliya Dimitrova	6' 1"	Opposite hitter
15	(United States) Mac Podraza	6' 2"	Setter
17	(United States) Alyssa Jensen	6' 4"	Middle blocker
27	(United States) Symone Abbott	6' 1"	Outside hitter
28	(United States) Kayla Caffey	6' 0"	Middle blocker
31	(Colombia) Camila Gómez	5' 2"	Libero
Head Coach:		(United States) Cathy George	

Omaha Supernovas
No.	Name	Height	Position
1	(Puerto Rico) Natalia Valentín-Anderson	5' 10"	Setter
2	(United States) Sydney Hilley	6' 0"	Setter
3	(United States) Kendall White	5' 7"	Libero
5	(United States) Brooke Nuneviller	5' 10"	Outside hitter
6	(United States) TeTori Dixon	6' 4"	Middle blocker
7	(United States) Gina Mancuso-Prososki	6' 1"	Outside hitter
10	(United States) Jess Schaben-Lansman	6' 2"	Outside hitter
11	(Bulgaria) Hristina Vuchkova	6' 2"	Middle blocker
13	(United States) Paige Briggs	5' 10"	Outside hitter
14	(United States) Nia Reed	6' 2"	Opposite hitter
15	(United States) Allison Mayfield	6' 1"	Outside hitter
18	(Dominican Republic) Bethania de la Cruz	6' 2"	Outside hitter
23	(United States) Gabby Curry	5' 7"	Libero
25	(United States) Maggie Cartwright	5' 11"	Opposite hitter
81	(United States) Danielle Hart	6' 3"	Middle blocker
Head Coach:		(United States) Laura Kuhn	

Orlando Valkyries
No.	Name	Height	Position
3	(United States) Melissa Evans	6' 1"	Opposite hitter
5	(United States) Georgia Murphy	5' 6"	Libero
7	(United States) Blake Mohler	6' 2"	Middle blocker
8	(Puerto Rico) Áurea Cruz	5' 10"	Outside hitter
9	(United States) M’Kaela White	6' 4"	Middle blocker
10	(United States) Jill Gillen	5' 7"	Outside hitter
11	(United States) Kaz Brown	6' 4"	Middle blocker
12	(Puerto Rico) Wilma Rivera	5' 8"	Setter
14	(United States) Adora Anae	6' 1"	Outside hitter
15	(Canada) Shainah Joseph	6' 1"	Opposite hitter
18	(United States) Carly Skjodt	6' 1"	Outside hitter
19	(United States) Abby Hansen	6' 5"	Middle blocker
20	(Puerto Rico) Paula Cerame	5' 8"	Libero
21	(United States) Azhani Tealer	5' 10"	Opposite hitter
22	(United States) Carly Graham	6' 0"	Setter
Head Coach:		(United States) Amy Pauly	

San Diego Mojo
No.	Name	Height	Position
1	(United States) August Raskie	6' 0"	Setter
2	(Puerto Rico) Shara Venegas	5' 7"	Libero
3	(United States) Kendra Dahlke	6' 0"	Outside hitter
7	(United States) Ronika Stone	6' 2"	Middle blocker
8	(United States) Hannah Tapp	6' 2"	Middle blocker
9	(United States) Grace Loberg	6' 3"	Outside hitter
10	(United States) Alison Bastianelli	6' 3"	Middle blocker
12	(Italy) Valeria Papa	6' 0"	Outside hitter
13	(Thailand) Nootsara Tomkom	5' 7"	Setter
16	(United States) Lindsey Vander Weide	6' 3"	Outside hitter
17	(United States) Lindsay Stalzer	6' 1"	Outside hitter
19	(United States) Temi Thomas-Ailara	6' 2"	Outside hitter
23	(Puerto Rico) Nomaris Velez-Agosto	5' 4"	Libero
30	(United States) Morgan Lewis	6' 3"	Opposite hitter
Head Coach:		(United States) Tayyiba Haneef-Park	

Vegas Thrill
No.	Name	Height	Position
1	(United States) Khat Bell	6' 2"	Outside hitter
4	(United States) Kylie Murr	5' 6"	Libero
5	(United States) Molly McCage	6' 3"	Middle blocker
6	(United States) Alisha Glass-Childress	6' 0"	Setter
7	(Canada) Layne Van Buskirk	6' 4"	Middle blocker
9	(United States) Hannah Pukis	5' 11"	Setter
10	(United States) Paulina Prieto-Cerame	6' 2"	Outside hitter
11	(United States) Hannah Maddux	6' 2"	Outside hitter
12	(United States) Berkeley Oblad	6' 4"	Middle blocker
15	(United States) Gabby Gonzales	6' 3"	Outside hitter
19	(United States) Kenna Sauer	6' 1"	Outside hitter
21	(United States) Ainise Havili	5' 10"	Setter
24	(United States) Meghan McClure-Jemison	6' 0"	Outside hitter
91	(Germany) Saskia Hippe	6' 1"	Opposite hitter
Head Coach:		(United States) Fran Flory	

=== Coaching changes ===
Mid-season
Team	Departing Coach	New Coach	Reference
Omaha Supernovas	Shelton Collier	Laura Kuhn (interim)	

== Regular season ==
=== Standings ===
#	Team	W	L	PCT	Home	Road	Streak
1	x – Atlanta Vibe	19	5	.792	10–2	9–3	W3
2	x – Omaha Supernovas	16	8	.667	9–3	7–4	L1
3	x – San Diego Mojo	13	11	.542	7–5	6–6	W3
4	x – Grand Rapids Rise	12	12	.500	7–5	5–7	W2
5	e – Columbus Fury	8	16	.333	6–6	2–10	L5
6	e – Orlando Valkyries	8	16	.333	4–8	4–8	W1
7	e – Vegas Thrill	8	16	.333	3–9	5–7	L2

Notes

(#) – League Standing
x – Clinched playoff berth
e – Eliminated from postseason contention
Source: Standings

=== Schedule ===
2024 Pro Volleyball Federation regular season
January

Date	Time (ET)	Matchup			TV	Set 1	Set 2	Set 3	Set 4	Set 5	Attendance	Location
Wednesday, January 24	8:00 p.m.	Atlanta	3–2	Omaha	YouTube	26–24	25–23	17–25	19–25	15–13	11,624	CHI Health Center
Thursday, January 25	7:00 p.m.	Columbus	0–3	Grand Rapids	YouTube	17–25	23–25	19–25			7,805	Van Andel Arena
Friday, January 26	7:00 p.m.	Atlanta	3–2	Orlando	YouTube	20–25	27–25	27–25	16–25	15–12	5,284	Addition Financial Arena

February

Date	Time (ET)	Matchup			TV	Set 1	Set 2	Set 3	Set 4	Set 5	Attendance	Location
Thursday, February 1	7:00 p.m.	San Diego	0–3	Atlanta	YouTube	17–25	15–25	16–25			6,100	Gas South Arena
Saturday, February 3	7:00 p.m.	San Diego	0–3	Omaha	YouTube	17–25	18–25	22–25			11,403	CHI Health Center
Wednesday, February 7	8:00 p.m.	Vegas	3–2	Omaha	YouTube	19–25	25–23	25–20	18–25	15–12	9,076	CHI Health Center
Friday, February 9	7:00 p.m.	Grand Rapids	3–1	Atlanta	YouTube	25–20	21–25	25–22	25–22		2,996	Gas South Arena
Saturday, February 10	7:00 p.m.	Vegas	1–3	Orlando	YouTube	23–25	10–25	25–23	21–25		3,308	Addition Financial Arena
Monday, February 12	7:00 p.m.	Omaha	3–1	Grand Rapids	YouTube	21–25	33–31	30–28	25–21		4,060	Van Andel Arena
Monday, February 12	7:00 p.m.	Orlando	2–3	Atlanta	YouTube	21–25	25–19	21–25	25–22	15–17	2,470	Gas South Arena
Thursday, February 15	10:00 p.m.	Omaha	3–1	Vegas	YouTube	25–15	24–26	25–22	25–19		3,974	Dollar Loan Center
Friday, February 16	7:00 p.m.	Columbus	1–3	Orlando	YouTube	27–25	22–25	20–25	11–25		3,696	Addition Financial Arena
Sunday, February 18	4:00 p.m.	Atlanta	2–3	Grand Rapids	YouTube	19–25	18–25	25–23	25–23	11–15	4,566	Van Andel Arena
Sunday, February 18	6:00 p.m.	Orlando	1–3	Omaha	YouTube	13–25	21–25	25–21	20–25		11,918	CHI Health Center
Monday, February 19	7:00 p.m.	San Diego	0–3	Vegas	YouTube	16–25	15–25	21–25			1,361	Dollar Loan Center
Wednesday, February 21	7:00 p.m.	Omaha	1–3	Columbus	YouTube	12–25	21–25	25–23	23–25		9,165	Nationwide Arena
Thursday, February 22	10:00 p.m.	Orlando	3–1	Vegas	YouTube	25–23	25–18	20–25	30–28		907	Dollar Loan Center
Friday, February 23	10:00 p.m.	Grand Rapids	1–3	San Diego	YouTube	34–36	27–25	23–25	23–25		6,020	Viejas Arena
Saturday, February 24	10:00 p.m.	Columbus	3–0	Vegas	YouTube	26–24	25–23	25–20			2,403	Dollar Loan Center
Sunday, February 25	3:00 p.m.	Omaha	3–1	Orlando	YouTube	30–28	17–25	25–23	25–18		3,487	Addition Financial Arena
Monday, February 26	7:00 p.m.	Vegas	1–3	Columbus	YouTube	23–25	25–22	21–25	23–25		2,714	Nationwide Arena
Thursday, February 29	7:00 p.m.	Omaha	3–0	Atlanta	YouTube	25–22	25–20	25–22			2,500	Gas South Arena
Thursday, February 29	10:00 p.m.	Vegas	3–2	San Diego	YouTube	25–23	25–20	19–25	27–29	15–11	1,409	Viejas Arena

March

Date	Time (ET)	Matchup			TV	Set 1	Set 2	Set 3	Set 4	Set 5	Attendance	Location
Friday, March 1	7:00 p.m.	Grand Rapids	1–3	Orlando	YouTube	20–25	25–21	30–32	25–27		4,018	Addition Financial Arena
Saturday, March 2	10:00 p.m.	Atlanta	3–0	San Diego	YouTube	26–24	25–20	25–23			3,071	Viejas Arena
Sunday, March 3	3:00 p.m.	Columbus	3–2	Orlando	YouTube	25–17	21–25	30–28	21–25	17–15	3,077	Addition Financial Arena
Monday, March 4	10:00 p.m.	Atlanta	3–0	Vegas	YouTube	25–16	25–18	26–24			2,497	Dollar Loan Center
Monday, March 4	10:00 p.m.	Grand Rapids	2–3	San Diego	YouTube	25–16	19–25	17–25	25–22	9–15	1,097	Viejas Arena
Saturday, March 9	12:00 p.m.	Columbus	1–3	Grand Rapids	YouTube	15–25	25–13	17–25	23–25		5,011	Van Andel Arena
Saturday, March 9	7:00 p.m.	Vegas	1–3	Atlanta	YouTube	16–25	25–22	23–25	20–25		5,000	Gas South Arena
Saturday, March 9	7:00 p.m.	Omaha	3–2	Orlando	YouTube	25–19	17–25	25–18	18–25	15–6	3,633	Addition Financial Arena
Monday, March 11	7:00 p.m.	Vegas	3–1	Columbus	YouTube	21–25	28–26	25–17	25–16		3,511	Nationwide Arena
Monday, March 11	10:00 p.m.	Orlando	3–2	San Diego	YouTube	19–25	25–20	23–25	25–21	15–12	1,322	Viejas Arena
Thursday, March 14	8:00 p.m.	Atlanta	3–1	Omaha	NCN Sports Now	25–20	15–25	25–21	25–12		8,114	CHI Health Center
Saturday, March 16	7:00 p.m.	Orlando	1–3	Omaha	NCN Sports Now	23–25	25–22	22–25	20–25		12,090	CHI Health Center
Sunday, March 17	4:00 p.m.	Vegas	3–2	Grand Rapids	YouTube	21–25	21–25	25–21	25–16	15–12	4,259	Van Andel Arena
Wednesday, March 20	7:00 p.m.	Grand Rapids	3–1	Columbus	YouTube	25–20	25–18	19–25	32–30		2,946	Nationwide Arena
Thursday, March 21	7:00 p.m.	Orlando	0–3	Atlanta	Peachtree Sports Network	17–25	13–25	20–25			1,800	Gas South Arena
Sunday, March 24	2:00 p.m.	Atlanta	1–3	Columbus	YouTube	22–25	29–27	21–25	23–25		4,074	Nationwide Arena
Sunday, March 24	7:00 p.m.	San Diego	3–0	Vegas	YouTube	25–21	25–23	25–16			5,113	Dollar Loan Center
Tuesday, March 26	10:00 p.m.	Grand Rapids	3–1	Vegas	YouTube	25–22	24–26	25–17	30–28		2,366	Dollar Loan Center
Wednesday, March 27	7:00 p.m.	Columbus	0–3	Atlanta	Peachtree Sports Network	16–25	15–25	17–25			2,133	Gas South Arena
Thursday, March 28	8:00 p.m.	Grand Rapids	1–3	Omaha	NCN Sports Now	25–27	25–20	28–30	22–25		7,505	CHI Health Center
Friday, March 29	7:00 p.m.	Orlando	3–0	Columbus	YouTube	25–19	25–15	25–17			3,642	Nationwide Arena
Saturday, March 30	7:00 p.m.	Vegas	0–3	Omaha	NCN Sports Now	19–25	17–25	21–25			10,315	CHI Health Center
Saturday, March 30	7:00 p.m.	San Diego	0–3	Atlanta	YouTube	15–25	17–25	21–25			4,000	Gas South Arena

April

Date	Time (ET)	Matchup			TV	Set 1	Set 2	Set 3	Set 4	Set 5	Attendance	Location
Monday, April 1	7:00 p.m.	Atlanta	3–1	Grand Rapids	YouTube	25–23	25–10	18–25	25–23		2,614	Van Andel Arena
Tuesday, April 2	10:00 p.m.	Omaha	1–3	San Diego	YouTube	25–20	21–25	23–25	22–25		2,466	Viejas Arena
Thursday, April 4	8:00 p.m.	Columbus	1–3	Omaha	NCN Sports Now	20–25	22–25	25–21	22–25		7,411	CHI Health Center
Saturday, April 6	7:00 p.m.	Orlando	3–2	Grand Rapids	CBS Sports Network	25–18	21–25	25–21	19–25	15–9	5,250	Van Andel Arena
Sunday, April 7	7:00 p.m.	Columbus	1–3	San Diego	YouTube	25–23	19–25	22–25	23–25		8,938	Viejas Arena
Monday, April 8	10:00 p.m.	Atlanta	3–0	Vegas	YouTube	25–21	25–18	25–23			2,186	Dollar Loan Center
Wednesday, April 10	10:00 p.m.	Atlanta	3–0	San Diego	YouTube	25–17	25–19	25–13			1,370	Viejas Arena
Thursday, April 11	10:30 a.m.	Grand Rapids	3–0	Orlando	YouTube	25–23	25–21	25–22			3,107	Addition Financial Arena
Friday, April 12	7:00 p.m.	San Diego	3–2	Columbus	CBS Sports Network	21–25	25–23	25–19	23–25	15–10	7,805	Nationwide Arena
Saturday, April 13	7:00 p.m.	Vegas	2–3	Grand Rapids	YouTube	23–25	21–25	25–21	25–22	9–15	4,396	Van Andel Arena
Saturday, April 13	7:00 p.m.	Omaha	1–3	Atlanta	YouTube	17–25	25–21	16–25	18–25		4,000	Gas South Arena
Sunday, April 14	3:00 p.m.	San Diego	3–2	Orlando	YouTube	25–23	21–25	25–19	21–25	18–16	3,386	Addition Financial Arena
Tuesday, April 16	7:00 p.m.	Grand Rapids	1–3	Atlanta	Peachtree Sports Network	25–23	22–25	22–25	15–25		1,000	Gas South Arena
Wednesday, April 17	10:00 p.m.	Columbus	0–3	Vegas	YouTube	18–25	23–25	18–25			1,869	Dollar Loan Center
Thursday, April 18	7:00 p.m.	Orlando	1–3	Grand Rapids	YouTube	14–25	25–17	20–25	13–25		3,252	Van Andel Arena
Friday, April 19	7:00 p.m.	Atlanta	1–3	Columbus	YouTube	25–23	20–25	22–25	21–25		4,388	Nationwide Arena
Saturday, April 20	7:00 p.m.	San Diego	2–3	Omaha	NCN Sports Now	23–25	25–21	20–25	25–23	12–15	11,303	CHI Health Center
Saturday, April 20	10:00 p.m.	Grand Rapids	3–1	Vegas	YouTube	25–23	25–20	23–25	25–22		2,343	Dollar Loan Center
Sunday, April 21	3:00 p.m.	Atlanta	3–1	Orlando	CBS Sports Network	25–22	25–20	23–25	25–17		4,107	Addition Financial Arena
Tuesday, April 23	10:00 p.m.	Omaha	2–3	San Diego	YouTube	25–19	17–25	22–25	25–21	8–15	1,436	Viejas Arena
Friday, April 26	7:00 p.m.	Orlando	1–3	Columbus	YouTube	25–22	24–26	12–25	15–25		2,864	Nationwide Arena
Friday, April 26	8:00 p.m.	Grand Rapids	2–3	Omaha	CBS Sports Network	22–25	25–23	20–25	25–16	7–15	7,107	CHI Health Center
Friday, April 26	10:00 p.m.	Vegas	3–2	San Diego	YouTube	25–21	22–25	25–17	22–25	15–13	3,065	Viejas Arena
Sunday, April 28	2:00 p.m.	Grand Rapids	0–3	Columbus	YouTube	21–25	15–25	15–25			3,379	Nationwide Arena
Sunday, April 28	2:00 p.m.	Vegas	0–3	Atlanta	CBS Sports Network	17–25	20–25	20–25			4,500	Gas South Arena
Monday, April 29	10:00 p.m.	Orlando	2–3	San Diego	YouTube	18–25	25–19	15–25	25–18	11–15	3,679	Viejas Arena

May

Date	Time (ET)	Matchup			TV	Set 1	Set 2	Set 3	Set 4	Set 5	Attendance	Location
Wednesday, May 1	10:00 p.m.	Orlando	2–3	Vegas	YouTube	26–24	15–25	25–22	21–25	12–15	3,098	Dollar Loan Center
Thursday, May 2	7:00 p.m.	Columbus	0–3	Atlanta	Peachtree Sports Network	21–25	19–25	18–25			2,500	Gas South Arena
Saturday, May 4	7:00 p.m.	Omaha	3–1	Columbus	CBS Sports Network	24–26	25–22	25–18	25–20		6,100	Nationwide Arena
Saturday, May 4	7:00 p.m.	San Diego	3–1	Grand Rapids	YouTube	22–25	25–18	27–25	25–15		3,421	Van Andel Arena
Sunday, May 5	4:00 p.m.	San Diego	0–3	Grand Rapids	YouTube	23–25	18–25	16–25			3,885	Van Andel Arena
Monday, May 6	10:00 p.m.	Omaha	3–0	Vegas	YouTube	25–16	25–23	25–16			4,322	Dollar Loan Center
Tuesday, May 7	10:00 p.m.	Columbus	1–3	San Diego	YouTube	22–25	21–25	25–19	21–25		3,740	Viejas Arena
Thursday, May 9	7:00 p.m.	San Diego	3–2	Orlando	YouTube	23–25	25–17	20–25	25–20	15–6	3,106	Addition Financial Arena
Thursday, May 9	8:00 p.m.	Columbus	0–3	Omaha	YouTube	25–27	23–25	21–25			8,009	CHI Health Center
Saturday, May 11	7:00 p.m.	Vegas	0–3	Orlando	YouTube	24–26	18–25	15–25			3,692	Addition Financial Arena
Saturday, May 11	7:00 p.m.	San Diego	3–1	Columbus	YouTube	22–25	25–20	25–22	31–29		3,624	Nationwide Arena
Sunday, May 12	4:00 p.m.	Omaha	2–3	Grand Rapids	CBS Sports Network	16–25	25–23	25–23	24–26	10–15	5,362	Van Andel Arena

Note: All times Eastern

== Playoffs ==
The CHI Health Center in Omaha hosted the inaugural playoffs.

Semifinals
1	Atlanta Vibe	2
4	Grand Rapids Rise	3
2	Omaha Supernovas	3
3	San Diego Mojo	2

Finals
4	Grand Rapids Rise	0
2	Omaha Supernovas	3

=== Semifinals ===
	Score		Set 1	Set 2	Set 3	Set 4	Set 5
(1) Atlanta Vibe	2–3	(4) Grand Rapids Rise	20–25	25–19	20–25	25–23	8–15
(2) Omaha Supernovas	3–2	(3) San Diego Mojo	20–25	16–25	25–18	25–8	15–11

=== Final ===
	Score		Set 1	Set 2	Set 3	Set 4	Set 5
(2) Omaha Supernovas	3–0	(4) Grand Rapids Rise	25–13	26–24	25–22		

Note: All times Eastern

== Attendance ==
=== Average home attendances ===
Ranked from highest to lowest average attendance.

Regular season
Team	GP	Attendance	High	Low	Average
Omaha Supernovas	12	115,875	12,090	7,107	9,656
Columbus Fury	12	54,212	9,165	2,714	4,518
Grand Rapids Rise	12	53,881	7,805	2,614	4,490
Orlando Valkyries	12	43,901	5,284	3,077	3,658
Atlanta Vibe	12	38,999	6,100	1,000	3,250
San Diego Mojo	12	37,613	8,938	1,097	3,134
Vegas Thrill	12	32,439	5,113	907	2,703
Total	84	376,920	12,090	907	4,487

Updated through May 12th

== Awards ==
=== Player of the Week Award ===
Date Awarded	Player	Team	Ref
January 30	Alli Linnehan	Atlanta Vibe	
February 6	Leah Edmond	Atlanta Vibe	
February 13	Adora Anae	Orlando Valkyries	
February 20	Emiliya Dimitrova	Grand Rapids Rise	
February 27	Reagan Cooper	Columbus Fury	
March 5	Anna Lazareva	Atlanta Vibe	
March 12	Brooke Nuneviller	Omaha Supernovas	
March 19	Alisha Glass-Childress	Vegas Thrill	
March 26	Asjia O'Neal	Columbus Fury	
April 2	Sydney Hilley	Omaha Supernovas	
April 10	Bethania de la Cruz	Omaha Supernovas	
April 17	Nootsara Tomkom	San Diego Mojo	
April 23	Marlie Monserez	Atlanta Vibe	
April 30	Willow Johnson	San Diego Mojo	
May 7	Natalia Valentín-Anderson	Omaha Supernovas	
May 14	Lindsey Vander Weide	San Diego Mojo	

=== Postseason awards ===
Award	Winner	Team	Ref
Most Valuable Player Award	Leah Edmond	Atlanta Vibe	
Finals MVP Award	Sydney Hilley	Omaha Supernovas	
Rising Star Award	Reagan Cooper	Columbus Fury	
Most Inspirational Player Award	Alisha Glass-Childress	Vegas Thrill	
Libero of the Year Award	Morgan Hentz	Atlanta Vibe	
Middle Blocker of the Year Award	Kaz Brown	Orlando Valkyries	
Opposite Hitter of the Year Award	Emiliya Dimitrova	Grand Rapids Rise	
Outside Hitter of the Year Award	Leah Edmond	Atlanta Vibe	
Server of the Year Award	Bethania de la Cruz	Omaha Supernovas	
Setter of the Year Award	Nootsara Tomkom	San Diego Mojo	
Coach of the Year Award	Tayyiba Haneef-Park	San Diego Mojo	

- All-PVF First Team:
  - OH Leah Edmond, Atlanta Vibe
  - L Morgan Hentz, Atlanta Vibe
  - OPP Anna Lazareva, Atlanta Vibe
  - OH Claire Chaussee, Grand Rapids Rise
  - OPP Emiliya Dimitrova, Grand Rapids Rise
  - OH Bethania de la Cruz, Omaha Supernovas
  - OH Brooke Nuneviller, Omaha Supernovas
- All-PVF Second Team:
  - S Marlie Monserez, Atlanta Vibe
  - OH Reagan Cooper, Columbus Fury
  - MB Hristina Vuchkova, Omaha Supernovas
  - MB Kaz Brown, Orlando Valkyries
  - MB Ronika Stone, San Diego Mojo
  - S Nootsara Tomkom, San Diego Mojo
  - S Alisha Glass-Childress, Vegas Thrill
