= Shannon Scully =

American volleyball player (born 1999)

Personal information
- Nationality: American
- Born: March 3, 1999 (age 27); Huntington Beach, California, U.S.
- Height: 6’2”
- Education: Utah Utes (2017); Pepperdine Waves (2018–2020); USC (2021)

Volleyball information
- Position: Outside hitter / libero
- Current team: San Diego Mojo
- Number: 22

Career
Years	Teams
2022–2023	Terville Florange
2024	Grand Rapids Rise
2025	Orlando Valkyries
2026–	San Diego Mojo

Shannon Scully (born March 3, 1999) is an American volleyball player who plays as an outside hitter or libero for the San Diego Mojo.

== College career ==
Scully's career began at youth level in the Tstreet team, while also participating in Californian school tournaments with Mater Dei High School. After graduating, she played at college level in NCAA Division I, first with Utah (2017), then with Pepperdine (2018–2020) and finally with the Southern California (2021).

== Club career ==
In the 2022–23 season Scully began her professional career in France, participating in Ligue A with Terville Florange. She then participated in the Pro Volleyball Federation in 2024 with the Grand Rapids Rise, while in the following season, she moved to the Orlando Valkyries, with whom she won the championship.

In August 2025, Scully was signed by San Diego Mojo.

== Honors ==
=== Clubs ===
- 2025 Pro Volleyball Federation – Champions, with Orlando Valkyries
