= Tori Dilfer =

American volleyball player

Tori Stringer
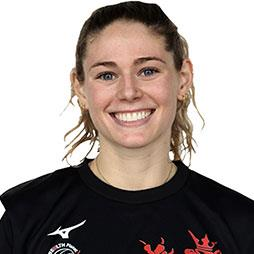
- Stringer in 2022

Personal information
- Full name: Victoria Belle Stringer
- Nickname: Tori
- Nationality: United States
- Born: Victoria Belle Dilfer; February 26, 1999 (age 27)
- Home town: Los Gatos, California, U.S.
- Education: TCU / Louisville
- Height: 5 ft 11 in (1.80 m)

Volleyball information
- Position: Setter
- Current club: Columbus Fury
- Number: 12

Career
- Years: Team
- 2017–2018: (United States) TCU
- 2019–2021: (United States) Louisville
- 2022: (United States) Athletes Unlimited
- 2022: (Italy) Wealth Planet Perugia Volley
- 2022: (Puerto Rico) Pinkin de Corozal
- 2024: (United States) Atlanta Vibe
- 2024–: (United States) Columbus Fury

National team
- Years: Team
- 2022: United States
Medal record
Indoor Volleyball
Representing the United States
Pan-American Cup
Bronze medal – third place	2022 Hermosillo
Pan-American Cup Final Six
Silver medal – second place	2022 Santo Domingo

Victoria Belle Stringer (née Dilfer; born February 26, 1999) is an American professional volleyball player who plays as a setter for the Columbus Fury of the Pro Volleyball Federation. Collegiately, she played for TCU and Louisville. She was a two time All-American at Louisville and helped the team to the program's first ever NCAA final four in 2021.

Professionally, she signed a contract to play for Italian Series A1 team Wealth Planet Perugia Volley in the 2022–23 season, before parting ways with the team in December 2022 after suffering an earlier injury during the season.

== Career ==
=== College ===
Stringer played college volleyball for a total of five years, as she opted to use the extra year of eligibility granted by the NCAA due to the COVID-19 pandemic.

She first attended Texas Christian University and played two seasons there. She was named to the All-Big 12 second team after racking up 1,134 assists during her sophomore year in 2018.

Stringer transferred to Louisville in 2019 and would play there for the remaining 3 years of eligibility. In her first season with the Cardinals, she led them to the program's first ever NCAA Elite Eight appearance during the 2019 NCAA Tournament. In 2020, she was named the Atlantic Coast Conference Setter of the Year and an AVCA Third Team All-American. In her final season in 2021, she was named as Louisville's first ever First Team All-American and helped the Cardinals finish as the national semifinalists in the 2021 NCAA tournament, only recording one loss on the season. It was Louisville's first appearance in a Final Four in school history. She was a Honda Sports Award finalist in 2021. In 2021, she was invited to train with the U.S. Collegiate National team. She concluded her Louisville career with 2,675 assists and 501 digs.

She graduated with a marketing degree while having minors in management and sports administration.

=== Professional clubs ===
- (United States) Athletes Unlimited (2022)
- (Italy) Wealth Planet Perugia Volley (2022)
- (Puerto Rico) Pinkin de Corozal (2022)
- (United States) Atlanta Vibe (2024)
- (United States) Columbus Fury (2024–)

Stringer terminated her contract with Wealth Planet Perugia Volley by mutual agreement after suffering an injury. In 2024, Stringer joined the Pro Volleyball Federation's Atlanta Vibe. In March 2024, the Vibe traded Stringer to the Columbus Fury in exchange for the Fury's 2025 and 2026 first-round draft picks.

== Awards and honors ==
=== College ===
- AVCA First Team All-American (2021)
- ACC Setter of the Year (2020, 2021)
- AVCA Third Team All-American (2020)

== Personal life ==
Stringer played volleyball and was a track and field athlete at Valley Christian High School. She finished her high school volleyball career with 2,495 assists, 870 digs and 223 kills.

Stringer is the daughter of Trent Dilfer who played in the NFL for 14 years.
