= Grace Loberg =

American volleyball player (born 1999)

Personal information
- Born: March 11, 1999 (age 27); Geneva, Illinois
- Height: 6 ft 3 in (191 cm)
- Education: University of Wisconsin, Madison

Volleyball information
- Position: Outside Hitter
- Current club: Vegas Thrill
- Number: 9

Grace Loberg (born March 11, 1999) is an American volleyball player who plays as an outside hitter for the San Diego Mojo of Major League Volleyball.

== Biography ==
Grace is the daughter of Colleen Loberg, who played volleyball for Indiana University Bloomington from 1988 to 1991. She graduated from Geneva Community High School in 2017, after which she attended the University of Wisconsin Madison from 2017 to 2021, where she studied to be a child-life specialist.

== Career ==
Grace played volleyball in high school at Geneva Community High School, where she was named Under Armor First Team All-American in 2016. She played volleyball in college at the University of Wisconsin Madison, where she won the 2021 NCAA Division I women's volleyball tournament while playing with the Badgers, notching double-digit kills in the final. In 2024, she joined the San Diego Mojo for the inaugural season of Pro Volleyball Federation. For the 2025 season, she signed with the Vegas Thrill.

She played for Wisconsin Badgers women's volleyball, and San Diego Mojo.
