= Alli Linnehan =

American volleyball player (born 1999)

Personal information
- Full name: Alli Danielle Linnehan
- Nationality: United States
- Born: September 16, 1999 (age 27)
- Hometown: Floyds Knobs, Indiana, U.S.
- Height: 6 ft 1 in (1.85 m)
- Education: Kentucky

Volleyball information
- Position: Outside hitter
- Current club: Atlanta Vibe
- Number: 29 (national team)

Career
Years	Teams
2018–2021	Kentucky
2022–2023	Neptunes de Nantes
2023	Athletes Unlimited
2024–	Atlanta Vibe

National team
2022	United States
Medal record
Indoor Volleyball
Representing the United States
Pan-American Cup Final Six
Silver medal – second place	2022 Santo Domingo

Alli Danielle Linnehan (née Stumler; born September 16, 1999) is an American professional volleyball player who plays as an outside hitter for the Atlanta Vibe of the Pro Volleyball Federation. She also played for the United States women's national volleyball team in 2022.

== Early life ==
Linnehan grew up in Floyds Knobs, Indiana and played volleyball and basketball for her high school at Christian Academy of Indiana, helping lead them to a state volleyball title in her second year.

== Career ==
=== College ===
Linnehan chose to play volleyball for Kentucky, crediting her choosing the school because it was the first school to offer her a scholarship, as well as some of her family being fans of the school. She graduated from Kentucky in May 2022 summa cum laude with a degree in elementary education.

Linnehan was named SEC Freshman of the Year in 2018 after helping Kentucky to a conference title. During the season, she had 12 matches with double-digit kills and averaged 2.37 kills per set. Following her sophomore season in 2019, Linnehan earned her first AVCA All-American award, being named to third team, after averaging 3.36 kills per set during the season.

Linnehan was named an AVCA First Team All-American in 2020 after leading the Wildcats in kills per set during her junior season. She helped Kentucky win its first ever NCAA National Championship the same year, and was a finalist for the Senior CLASS Award in women's volleyball. She had 26 kills in the championship match versus Texas, with her final kill coming on the championship winning point. She was named a second team All-American in 2021 after helping Kentucky to another SEC title, and was named the conference player of the year, recording 4.09 points per set during the conference season.

=== Professional clubs ===
==== Neptunes de Nantes ====
Linnehan played for Neptunes de Nantes in the 2022–2023 professional season.

==== Atlanta Vibe ====
Linnehan will play for the Atlanta Vibe of the Pro Volleyball Federation for their inaugural 2024 season.

=== USA National Team ===
Linnehan made her national team debut in September 2022 at the NORCECA Pan American Cup Final Six tournament, winning a silver medal with the team.
