= Morgan Hentz =

American volleyball player (born 1998)

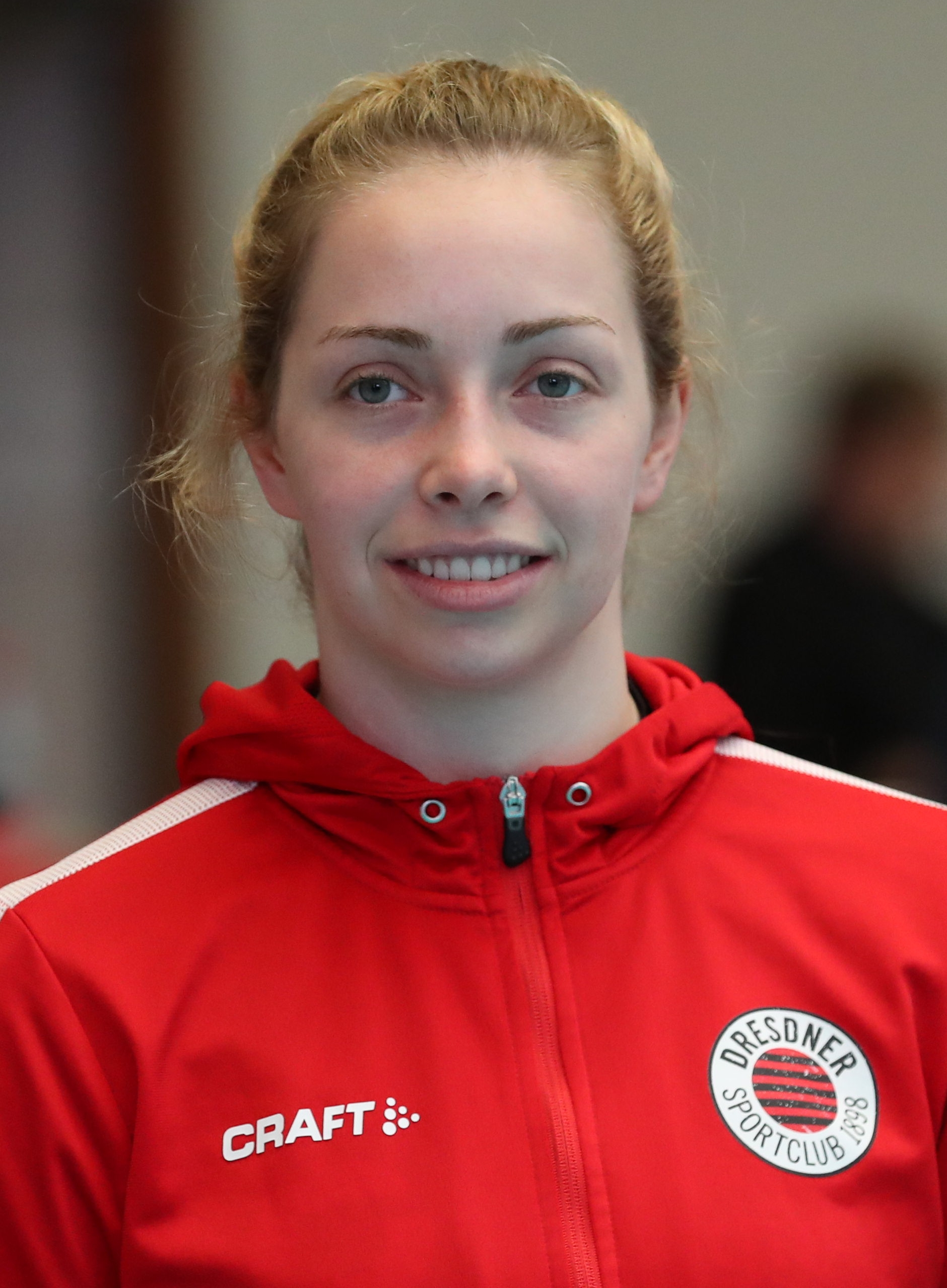
- Hentz in 2021

Personal information
- Full name: Morgan Irene Hentz
- Nationality: United States
- Born: July 27, 1998 (age 28); Fort Thomas, Kentucky, U.S.
- Hometown: Lakeside Park, Kentucky, U.S.
- Height: 5 ft 9 in (1.75 m)
- Education: Stanford

Volleyball information
- Position: Libero
- Current club: (United States) Grand Rapids Rise

Career
Years	Teams
2020–2021	(Germany) Dresdner SC
2022–2023	(United States) Athletes Unlimited
2024–2025	(United States) Atlanta Vibe
2026	(United States) Omaha Supernovas
2026–	(United States) Grand Rapids Rise

National team
2020–	United States
Medal record
Women's volleyball
Representing the United States
FIVB U18 World Championship
Silver medal – second place	2015 Lima	Team

Morgan Irene Hentz (born July 27, 1998) is an American professional volleyball player who plays as a libero for the United States women's national volleyball team and the Grand Rapids Rise of Major League Volleyball.

== Early life ==
Hentz was born to Mike and Kerin Hentz and grew up in Lakeside Park, Kentucky. She is the oldest of four siblings.

Hentz began playing volleyball while in third grade. She gained an interest in volleyball because she wanted to play with friends and enjoyed traveling to tournaments. She attended Notre Dame Academy where she played volleyball and graduated in 2016. She finished high school as the 22nd ranked recruit in the nation and was named Kentucky's Gatorade Player of the Year as a senior. She committed to Stanford University to play collegiate volleyball.

== Career ==
=== College ===
While at Stanford, Hentz was the starting libero all four years. She helped Stanford win NCAA national championships in 2016, 2018 and 2019. She was named Pac-12 libero of the year in 2017, 2018, and 2019, and was a three-time AVCA First Team All-American. She finished her Stanford career with 2,310 digs, which ranks first all time in Stanford volleyball history and fourth all time in Pac-12 history.

In addition to playing on Stanford's indoor team, she also played on Stanford's beach volleyball team in 2017, 2018 and 2019.

=== Professional clubs ===
- (Germany) Dresdner SC (2020–2021)
- (United States) Athletes Unlimited (2022–2023)
- (United States) Atlanta Vibe (PVF) (2024–2025)
- (United States) Omaha Supernovas (MLV) (2026)
- (United States) Grand Rapids Rise (MLV) (2026)

=== U.S. National Team ===
Hentz was invited to play on the U.S. national team in 2020, but the COVID-19 pandemic shut down training. In May 2022, Hentz made her national team playing debut when she was named to the 25-player roster for the 2022 FIVB Volleyball Nations League tournament. In her first match, a win vs. the Dominican Republic, she had a team-leading 15 digs and 10 excellent receptions.

== Awards and honors ==
=== Clubs ===
- 2020–21 German Bundesliga – Champion, with Dresdner SC.
- 2020–21 German Women's Volleyball Super Cup – Silver medal, with Dresdner SC.
- 2021–22 German Cup – Bronze medal, with Dresdner SC.
- 2022 Athletes Unlimited – Champion
- 2022 Athletes Unlimited "Best Libero"
- 2022 Athletes Unlimited "Defensive Player of the Year"

=== College ===
- 2016 NCAA Division I National Champions
- 2018 NCAA Division I National Champions
- 2019 NCAA Division I National Champions
- Pac-12 Libero of the Year (2017, 2018, 2019)
- AVCA First Team All-American (2017, 2018, 2019)
- co-NCAA Most Outstanding Player (2018)
