= Dallas Pulse =

American volleyball team

- Sport: Volleyball
- Founded: 2023
- League: Major League Volleyball
- Based in: Frisco, Texas
- Arena: Comerica Center
- Colors: Navy blue, cyan, white
- Owner: Armand Sadoughi
- Championships: 1 (2026)
- Website: provolleyball.com/teams/dallas-pulse

Dallas Pulse is a women's professional indoor volleyball team based in the Dallas–Fort Worth metroplex. The team inaugurated play in Major League Volleyball (MLV) as an expansion team in 2026.

== History ==
On July 19, 2023, Dallas was announced as a 2025 expansion team in the PVF, owned by Armand Sadoughi. On July 3, 2024, it was announced that the 2025 PVF Season will have eight teams, not including Dallas. In the following days, Dallas Pro Volleyball website was edited to indicate that team will join the PVF in 2026. On August 5th 2025, it was announced that the Pro Volleyball Federation (PVF) and Major League Volleyball (MLV) will merge to form a combined league, and that Dallas would be joining the league in the 2026 season.

On May 9, 2026, the Pulse won the MLV Championship over the Omaha Supernovas, 3-2 to claim the league championship in their first season as a franchise.

== Roster ==
Current as of February 2, 2026.

Number	Player	Position	College/Club	Height
1	(Puerto Rico) Natalia Valentín-Anderson	Setter	Florida International	5'10"
2	(Mexico) Sofia Maldonado Díaz	Outside hitter	Arizona/Louisville	6'0"
3	(United States) Celia Cullen	Setter	Michigan State/SMU	6'1"
6	(United States) Kylie Murr	Libero	Ohio State	5'6"
7	(Canada) Layne Van Buskirk	Middle blocker	Pittsburgh	6'4"
8	(United States) Kelsie Payne	Opposite hitter	Kansas	6'3"
9	(United States) Kaylee Cox	Outside hitter	Western Kentucky	6'3"
10	(United States) Kendall White	Libero	Penn State	5'5"
11	(United States) Malaya Jones	Opposite hitter	Colorado State/SMU	6'0"
12	(United States) Geli Cyr	Outside hitter	Arizona State	5'10"
15	(United States) Mimi Colyer	Outside hitter	Oregon/Wisconsin	6'3"
16	(United States) Caroline Meuth	Outside hitter	Notre Dame/Texas A&M	5'11"
17	(Germany) Isabel Martin	Outside hitter	Florida	6'0"
18	(Thailand) Ajcharaporn Kongyot	Outside hitter	Rattana Bundit University	6'0"
22	(United States) Tristin Savage	Middle blocker	UCLA	6'7"
23	(United States) Kaitlyn Hord	Middle blocker	Penn State/Nebraska	6'4"
42	(United States) Karson Bacon	Middle blocker	Oregon	6'4"
