= Rhamat Alhassan =

American volleyball player

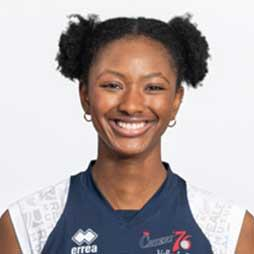

Personal information
- Nationality: United States
- Born: September 7, 1996 (age 30); Glenarden, Maryland, U.S.
- Height: 1.92 m (6 ft 4 in)
- Education: Florida

Volleyball information
- Position: Middle blocker
- Current club: (United States) Grand Rapids Rise
- Number: 10

Career
Years	Teams
2014–2018	(United States) Florida
2018–2019	(Japan) NEC Red Rockets
2019–2020	(Italy) Golden Tulip Volalto Caserta
2020–2022	(Italy) Reale Mutua Fenera Chieri
2022–2023	(Italy) Il Bisonte Firenze
2026-Present	(United States) Grand Rapids Rise

National team
2016–2022	United States
Medal record
Indoor Volleyball
Representing the United States
Pan-American Cup
Bronze medal – third place	2022 Hermosillo

Rhamat Alhassan (/ˌrʌˈmɑːt ˌɑːlˈhʌˌsɔːn/; born September 7, 1996) is an American volleyball middle blocker. She played for the United States women's national volleyball team from 2016 to 2022. At the University of Florida, she was a four-time collegiate All-American.

== Early life ==
Alhassan was born in Glenarden, Maryland. Her parents were Ghanaian immigrants, and she grew up speaking English and Hausa. She started playing basketball in seventh grade, and did not play volleyball until her sophomore year in high school, at The Academy of the Holy Cross in Kensington, Maryland.

== College ==
Many schools were interested in her as an athlete, but most were interested in her basketball skills, which were more advanced than her volleyball skills. Her former basketball coach, Eddie Simpson, says she "is a better basketball player than she is a volleyball player", and Alhassan agrees. Florida was one of many schools interested in her as a volleyball player. While in high school, Alhassan considered the possibility of playing both sports in college, but ended up concentrating on volleyball. Alhassan chose Florida, partly for the volleyball, partly for the location, and partly for Florida's College of Journalism and Communications.

In her last season at Florida, Alhassan helped lead the Gators to the 2017 National Championships. The Gators haven't been to the Final 4 since 2003.

In 2018, Alhassan won the Honda Sports Award as the nation's best female volleyball player. She also graduated in 2018 with a bachelor's degree in telecommunication production.

== Professional career ==
Alhassan continued to play volleyball professionally.

Professional Volleyball Career
Season	Team	Location	League	Notes
2018-2019	NEC Red Rockets	Tokyo, Japan	V1	
2019-2020	Caserta 2.0 Volalto	Caserta, Italy	A1	Didn't continue with the team after December 27, 2019
2020-2022	Reale Mutua Fenera Chieri '76	Chieri, Italy	A1	
2022-2023	Il Bisonte Firenze	Florence, Italy	A1	Chose to step away from volleyball
2026	Grand Rapids Rise	Grand Rapids, MI	MLV	

== Honors and awards ==
- Honda Sports Award for Volleyball (2018)
- American Volleyball Coaches Association (AVCA) All-American
- 2017 SEC Volleyball Player of the year
