= Raymariely Santos =

Puerto Rican volleyball player (born 1992)

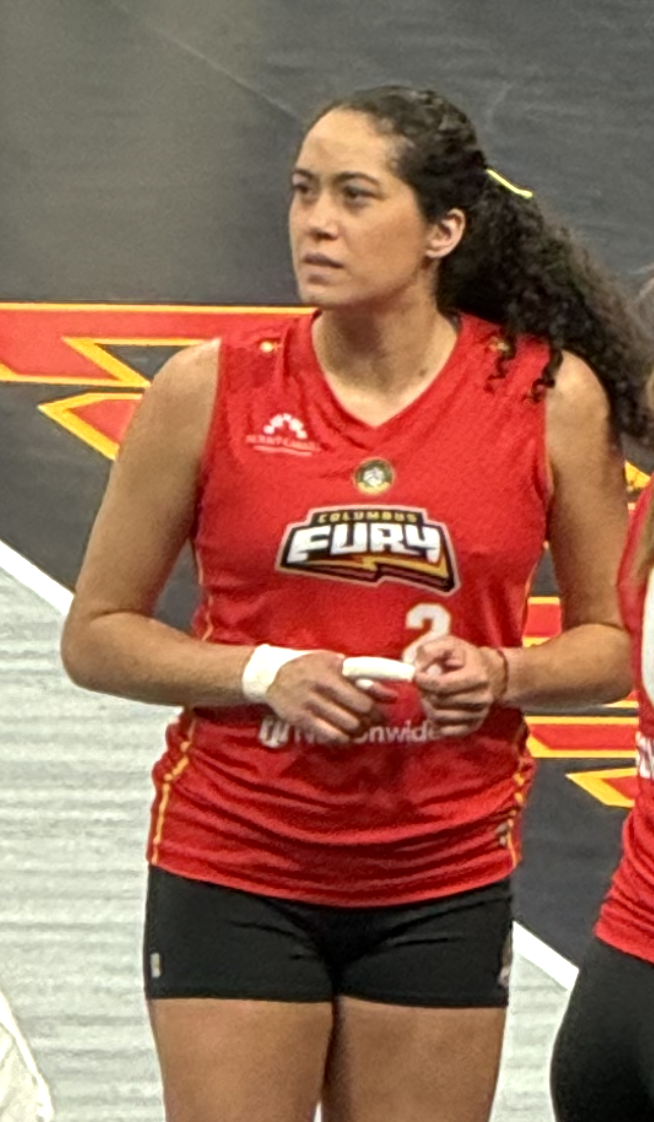
- Santos in 2024

Personal information
- Nationality: Puerto Rican
- Born: April 13, 1992 (age 34); Ponce, Puerto Rico
- Height: 1.83 m (6 ft 0 in)
- Weight: 72 kg (159 lb)
- Spike: 290 cm (114 in)
- Block: 288 cm (113 in)
- Education: Arkansas

Volleyball information
- Position: Setter
- Current club: Columbus Fury
- Number: 2

Career
Years	Teams
2010–2016	Leonas de Ponce
2016–?	Altay
2024–	Columbus Fury

National team
2009–	Puerto Rico
Honours
Women's volleyball
Representing Puerto Rico
Pan-American Cup
Bronze medal – third place	2017 Cañete

Raymariely Santos Pérez (born April 13, 1992) is a Puerto Rican female volleyball player for the Columbus Fury of the Pro Volleyball Federation and the Puerto Rico women's national volleyball team.

She participated in the 2010 FIVB Volleyball World Grand Prix, and in the 2014 FIVB Volleyball World Grand Prix. She has played for clubs in Puerto Rico, Spain and Kazakhstan.

In late 2017, she required surgery for an injury to a torn ligament in her finger.
