= Christian Academy of Indiana =

Private school in New Albany, Indiana, United States

Location
- 1000 Academy Drive; New Albany, Floyd County, Indiana 47150; United States
- Coordinates: 38.325641°N 85.828550°W

Information
- Type: Private school
- Motto: "Education with a higher purpose"
- Superintendent: Darin Long
- Principal: Krystal Morrow (Grades Pre-K to 5); Scott Luttrull (Grades 6 to 12)
- Grades: Pre-K to 12
- Enrollment: 1,074 (2023-2024)
- Color(s)
- Team name: Warriors
- Website: caschools.us/indiana

Christian Academy of Indiana is a private Pre-K through high school Christian school located in New Albany, Indiana.

== See also ==
- List of high schools in Indiana

== Notable alumni ==
- Alli Linnehan, volleyball player
