= Anna Lazareva =

Russian volleyball player (born 1997)

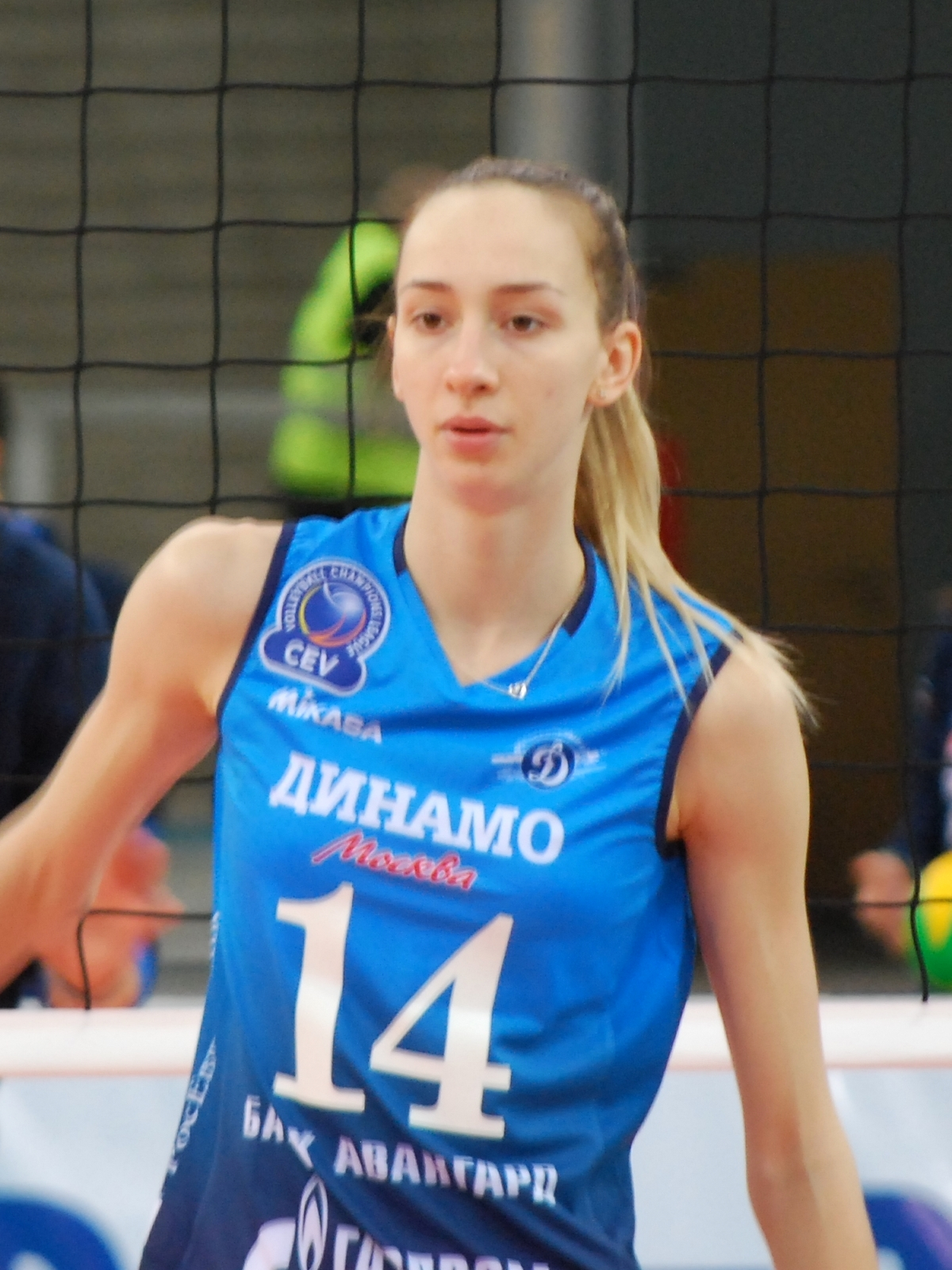

Personal information
- Nationality: Russian
- Born: 31 January 1997 (age 29)
- Height: 1.90 m (6 ft 3 in)
- Weight: 67 kg (148 lb)
- Spike: 315 cm (124 in)
- Block: 300 cm (118 in)

Volleyball information
- Position: Opposite
- Current club: THY
- Number: 7

National team
2017–	Russia

Anna Nikolayevna Lazareva (Russian: Анна Николаевна Лазарева; born 31 January 1997) is a Russian professional volleyball player currently playing for the Atlanta Vibe of the Pro Volleyball Federation and the Russian National Team.

== Career ==
Lazareva, who started playing volleyball at a young age, was born in 1997. She took part in the 2014 CEV U20 European Championship with the Russian Junior National Team uniform at the age of 16, and when she was 17, she started wearing the Dynamo Moscow A team jersey. Lazareva, who later took part in the Russian National Team, came second in the Yeltsin Cup in 2017 and received the "Best Young Player" award of the tournament. At the 2019 University Summer Games held in Naples, the young setter diagonal, who won the championship with the Russian National Team with a 3–1 score in the final match against Italy, became the top scorer of the match with 24 points.

Having spent the 2020–2021 season with the Korean team IBK Altos, the successful setter diagonal managed to finish as the leader of statistics in most matches she played. Lazareva, who finished third in the Korean League with the IBK Altos team, became the second top scorer of the league with 867 points in the Korean League. (2020–21)

She signed a contract with Fenerbahçe Opet in Turkey for the 2021–22 season.

On July 10, 2023, Lazareva signed with the Atlanta Vibe of the Pro Volleyball Federation. On January 20, 2024, Lazareva was put on the "exempt" list, but was promoted to the active roster on February 13 and played her first match with the Vibe on February 18.

Zeren Spor Kulübü based in Ankara, Türkiye announced the signing of Lazareva for the 2025/2026 Professional Season. She had a successful season with Zeren, Lazareva was the top attacker of the Turkish League with 528 points average 5.13 per set.

Lazareva signed with the Istanbul based Turk Hava Yollaira for the 2026/2027 season.
