= DC Flight =

Women's professional indoor volleyball team

- Founded: 2026
- League: Major League Volleyball
- Based in: Washington, D.C.
- Arena: The Anthem

The DC Flight are a women's professional indoor volleyball team based in Washington, D.C. The team will begin play in Major League Volleyball in 2027, and will play their 13 home games at The Anthem, on The Wharf. In May 2026, DC Flight named former player, Deitre Collins- Parker as their first head coach.

== Identity ==
The identity behind DC Flight draws on the history of air travel in Washington. The red, blue and purple, of the logo, represent faminine strength, while the gray represent physical strength. It would be the city first volleyball team and the city's fourth women's sport team.
