= Viejas Arena =

Arena in San Diego, California, US

- "Madhouse On The Mesa"

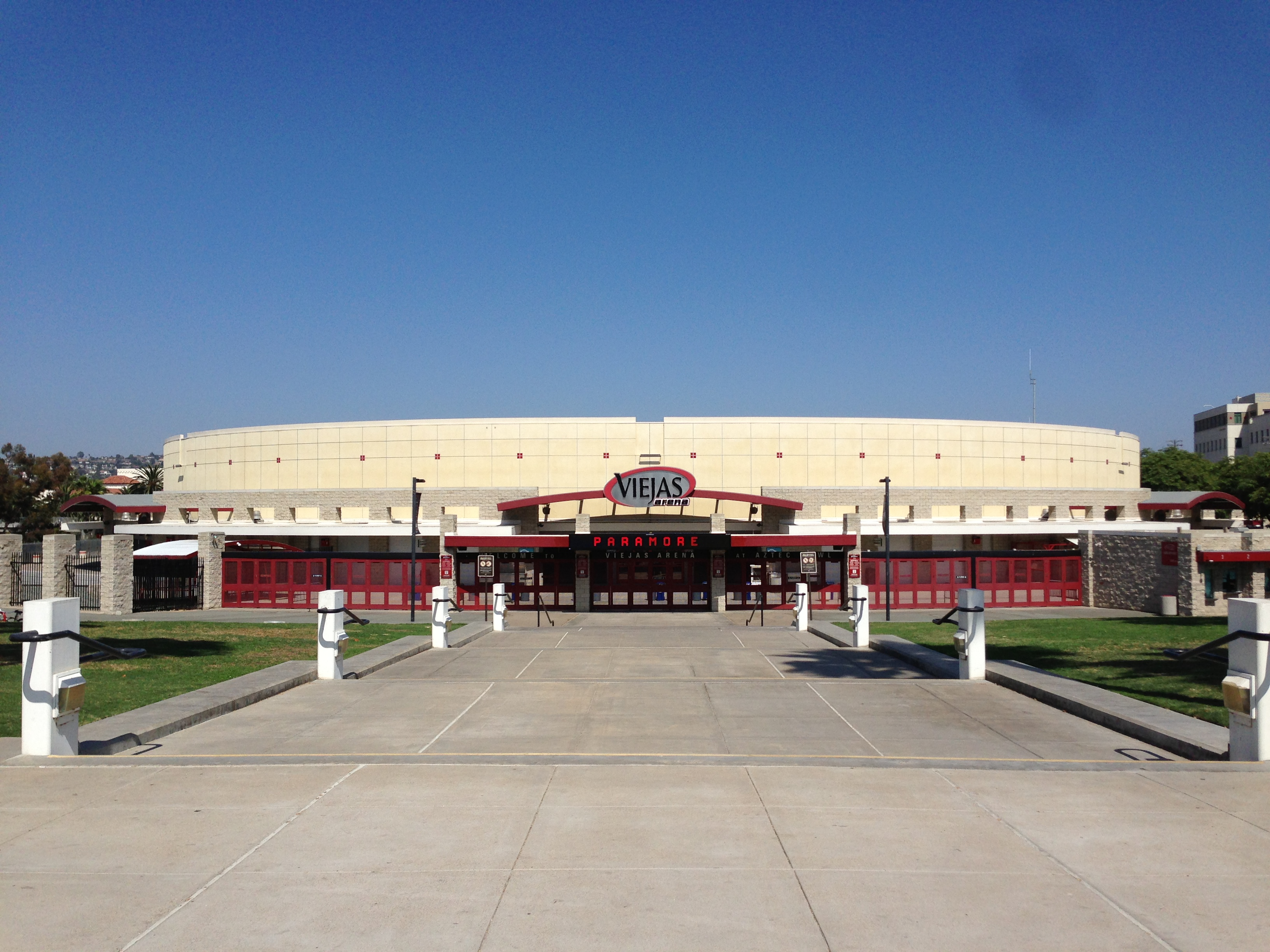
- Interactive map of Viejas Arena
- Former names: Cox Arena (1997–2009)
- Address: 5500 Canyon Crest Drive
- Location: San Diego, California, U.S.
- Coordinates: 32°46′25.5″N 117°4′28.5″W
- Owner: San Diego State University
- Operator: San Diego State University; Associated Students of SDSU
- Capacity: 12,414 (basketball); 12,845 (center stage concerts); 12,200 (end stage concerts)
- Public transit: SDSU

Construction
- Groundbreaking: March 27, 1995
- Opened: July 24, 1997 (29 years ago)
- Cost: $29 million ($58.2 million in 2025 dollars)
- Architects: Sink Combs Dethlefs; Carrier Johnson
- Structural engineer: Martin/Martin
- Services engineers: M-E Engineers, Inc.
- General contractors: Blake Construction Co., Inc

Tenants
- San Diego State Aztecs (NCAA) (1997–present); San Diego Shockwave (NIFL) (2007); San Diego Mojo (PVF/MLV) (2024–2026)

Website
- as.sdsu.edu/viejas_arena

Viejas Arena is an indoor arena in San Diego, California, located on the campus of San Diego State University (SDSU). Opened in 1997 on the site of the historic Aztec Bowl, it is the home of the San Diego State Aztecs men's and women's basketball teams. The Aztecs compete in NCAA Division I as a member of the Pac-12 Conference.

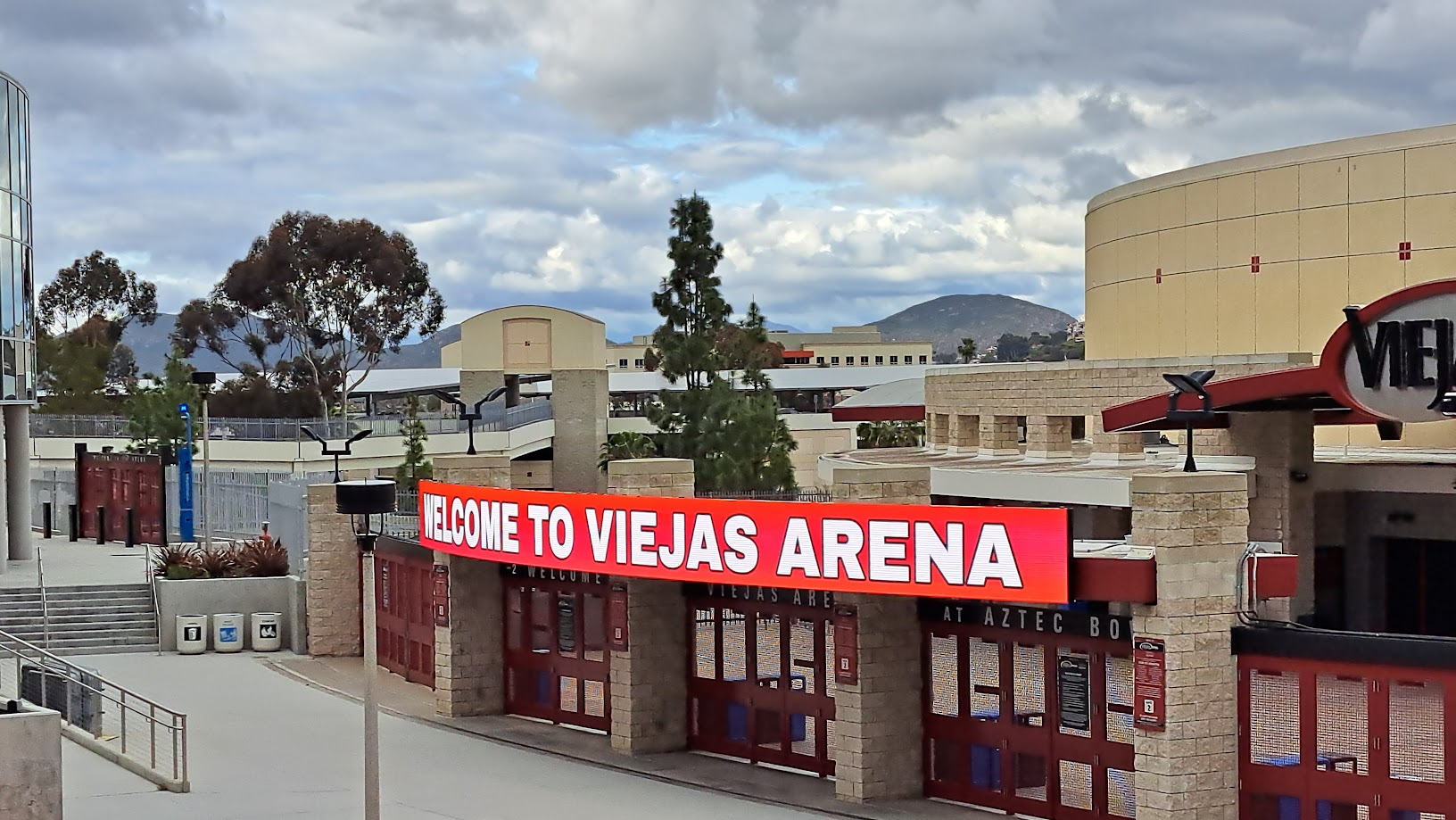
The main entrance to Viejas Arena

== History ==
Opened in 1997 as Cox Arena, the arena was built on the site of the historic Aztec Bowl stadium, which hosted the San Diego State Aztecs football team from the time of its construction in 1936 until 1967. The arena was built directly into a canyon hillside, enclosing one end of Aztec Bowl. Two sections of the stadium's original concrete bleachers and cobblestone walls remain visible.

Until July 1, 2009, the arena's naming rights were owned by Cox Communications. On March 17, 2009, the Viejas Band of Kumeyaay Indians announced the signing of a 10-year naming rights agreement; the arena was renamed to Viejas Arena.

John F. Kennedy, then the president of the United States, gave a commencement address and received the first honorary doctorate given by a California State University at Aztec Bowl on June 6, 1963.

On October 29, 2015, the basketball court was named Steve Fisher Court after men's basketball head coach Steve Fisher.

The San Diego Mojo of the Pro Volleyball Federation (PVF) began play in the league's inaugural 2024 season at the arena.

On April 4, 2024, San Diego State University announced a renovation study for Viejas Arena, focused on improving the main concourse, including food and beverage purveyors, hospitality experiences, and other services outside the arena.

== Events ==
Viejas Arena hosted the 2001 NCAA men's basketball first round as well as the 2001 NCAA women's volleyball national championship. The arena hosted the 2006 NCAA men's basketball first and second rounds, the 2009 NCAA women's basketball first and second rounds, and the 2014 NCAA men's basketball second and third rounds. The arena also hosted the 2018 and 2022 NCAA men's basketball first and second rounds. The arena will host the 2026 NCAA men’s basketball first and second rounds.

The arena has also hosted television events such as WCW's Bash at the Beach in 1998 and various episodes of WCW Monday Nitro. Viejas Arena hosted TNA Wrestling's Bound For Glory pay-per-view event on October 20, 2013. The arena was also the host venue of Megadeth's live DVD Blood in the Water: Live in San Diego. Additionally, the arena hosted an episode of All Elite Wrestling's Dynamite on May 31, 2023.

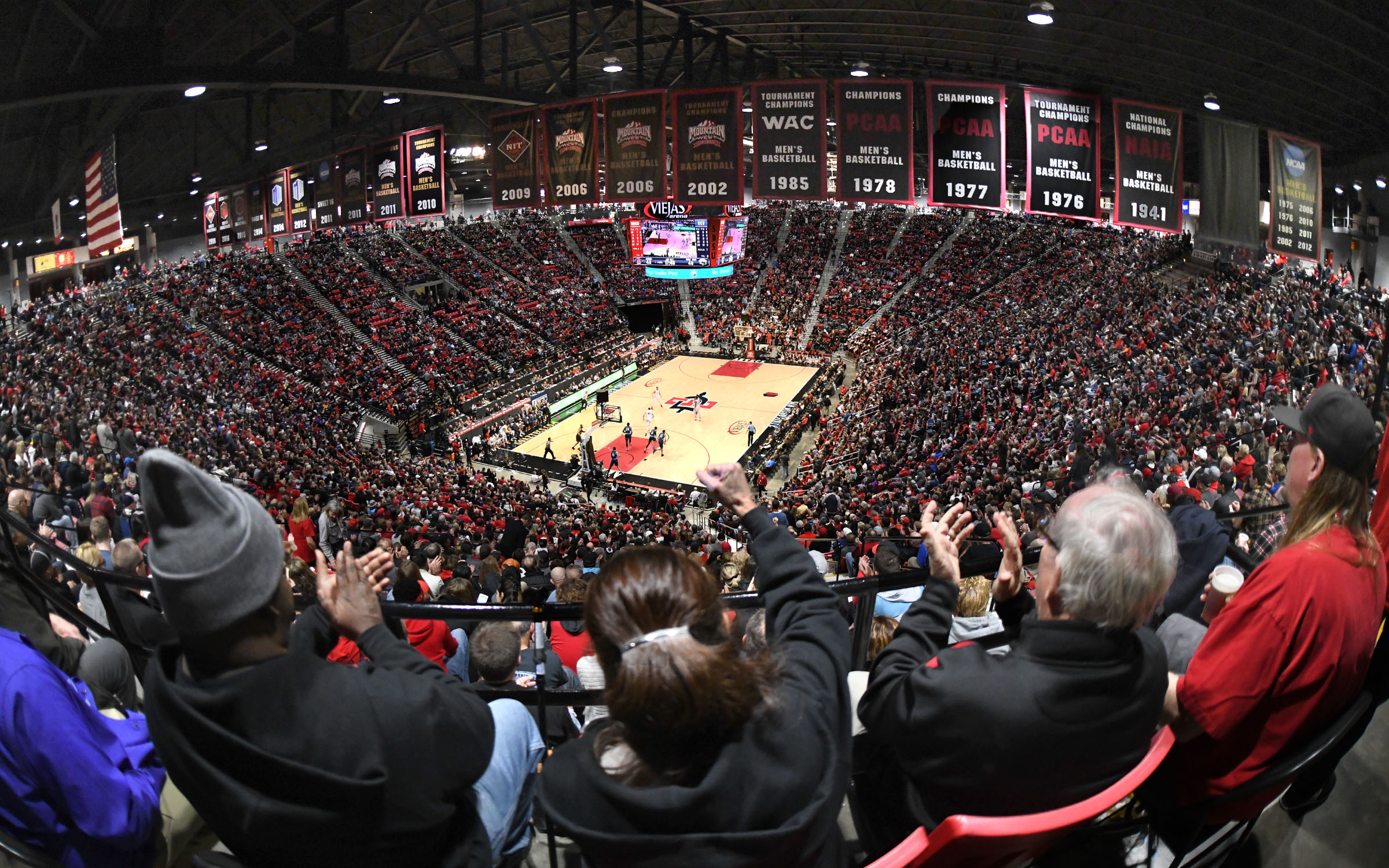
Inside Viejas Arena

== Concerts ==
Viejas Arena has hosted numerous concerts with artists and bands such as Beyoncé, Avril Lavigne, Cher, Demi Lovato, DJ Khaled, Eric Clapton, Britney Spears, Evanescence, Foo Fighters, John Mayer, The Chainsmokers, Black Eyed Peas, Nicki Minaj, Aerosmith, Lady Gaga, Twenty One Pilots, Pearl Jam, Paramore, SZA, Melanie Martinez, Charli XCX, Troye Sivan, Doja Cat and Tyga. In the spring of 2001, Billy Joel and Elton John opened their Face to Face tour with a sold-out show at the arena.

== See also ==
- List of indoor arenas in the United States
- List of NCAA Division I basketball arenas
