= Gina Mancuso =

American volleyball player (born 1991)

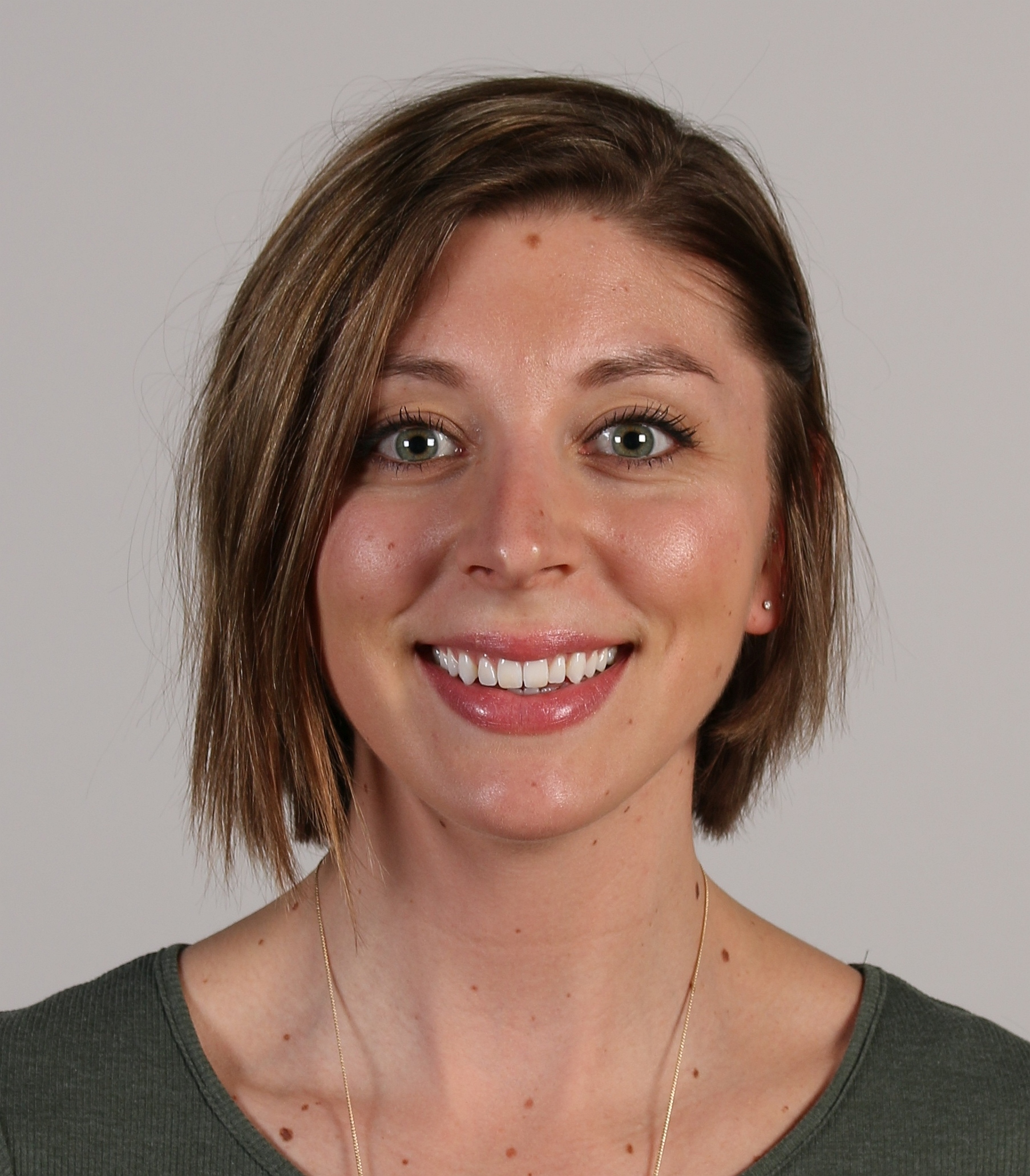
- Mancuso in 2016

Personal information
- Born: May 31, 1991 (age 35); Bellevue, Nebraska, U.S.
- Height: 183 cm (6 ft 0 in)
- Spike: 315 cm (124 in)
- Block: 301 cm (119 in)
- Education: University of Nebraska–Lincoln

Volleyball information
- Position: Outside hitter
- Current club: Omaha Supernovas
- Number: 7

Career
Years	Teams
2024-	Omaha Supernovas

National team
United States

Gina Mancuso-Prososki (born May 31, 1991) is an American volleyball player for the Omaha Supernovas of the Pro Volleyball Federation.

== Playing career ==
She played for University of Nebraska–Lincoln. She participated at the 2015–16 Women's CEV Cup, with Dresdner SC.

== Clubs ==
Club	From	To
USA University of Nebraska–Lincoln	2009-2010	2011-2012
PUR Leonas de Ponce	2013-2013	2013-2013
AZE Rabita Bakou	2013-2014	2013-2014
POL MKS Dąbrowa Górnicza	2014-2015	2014-2015
GER Dresdner SC	2015-2016	December 2016
PUR Leonas de Ponce	2017-2017	
USA Omaha Supernovas	2024-	
