= Orlando Valkyries =

American volleyball team

- Sport: Volleyball
- Founded: 2023
- League: Major League Volleyball
- Based in: Orlando, Florida
- Arena: Addition Financial Arena
- Colors: Navy, blue, tan and gray
- Owner: David Forman
- Head coach: Amy Pauly
- Championships: 1 (2025)
- Website: orlandovalkyries.com

The Orlando Valkyries are a women's professional indoor volleyball team based in Orlando, Florida that competes in Major League Volleyball (MLV). The Valkyries began play in the league's inaugural 2024 season. The team plays its home games at Addition Financial Arena on the main campus of the University of Central Florida, which has an Orlando mailing address but is in unincorporated Orange County. The Valkyries won the league's championship in the 2025 season.

== History ==
On May 24, 2023, Orlando was announced as one of the cities to get a Pro Volleyball Federation franchise for the league's inaugural season, owned by local businessman David Forman. The Valkyries name, logo and colors were announced on August 17.

== Roster ==
Current as of February 2, 2026.

Number	Player	Position	Height	College/Club
1	(United States) Charitie Luper	Outside hitter	5'9"	UCLA, Louisville
2	(United States) Hannah Pukis	Setter	5'11"	Washington State, Oregon
3	(Thailand) Pornpun Guedpard	Setter	5'7"	
4	(United States) Courtney Schwan	Outside hitter	6'1"	Washington
5	(United States) Georgia Murphy	Libero	5'6"	Oregon
6	(Puerto Rico) Brittany Abercrombie	Opposite hitter	6'2"	USC
7	(United States) Naya Shime	Opposite hitter	6'1"	Wyoming/SMU
8	(United States) Lindsey Vander Weide	Outside hitter	6'3"	Oregon
11	(United States) Kazmiere Brown	Middle blocker	6'4"	Kentucky
12	(Serbia) Teodora Pušić	Libero	5'7"	
13	(United States) Natalie Foster	Middle blocker	6'4"	Wichita State, SMU
14	(United States) Hannah Maddux	Outside hitter	6'2"	South Alabama
16	(United States) Colby Neal	Middle blocker	6'4"	Oregon, Arizona State
21	(United States) Bre Kelley	Middle blocker	6'4"	Florida, Pittsburgh
23	(United States) Emmy Klika	Libero	5'7"	Pittsburgh
