= Megan Courtney =

American volleyball player

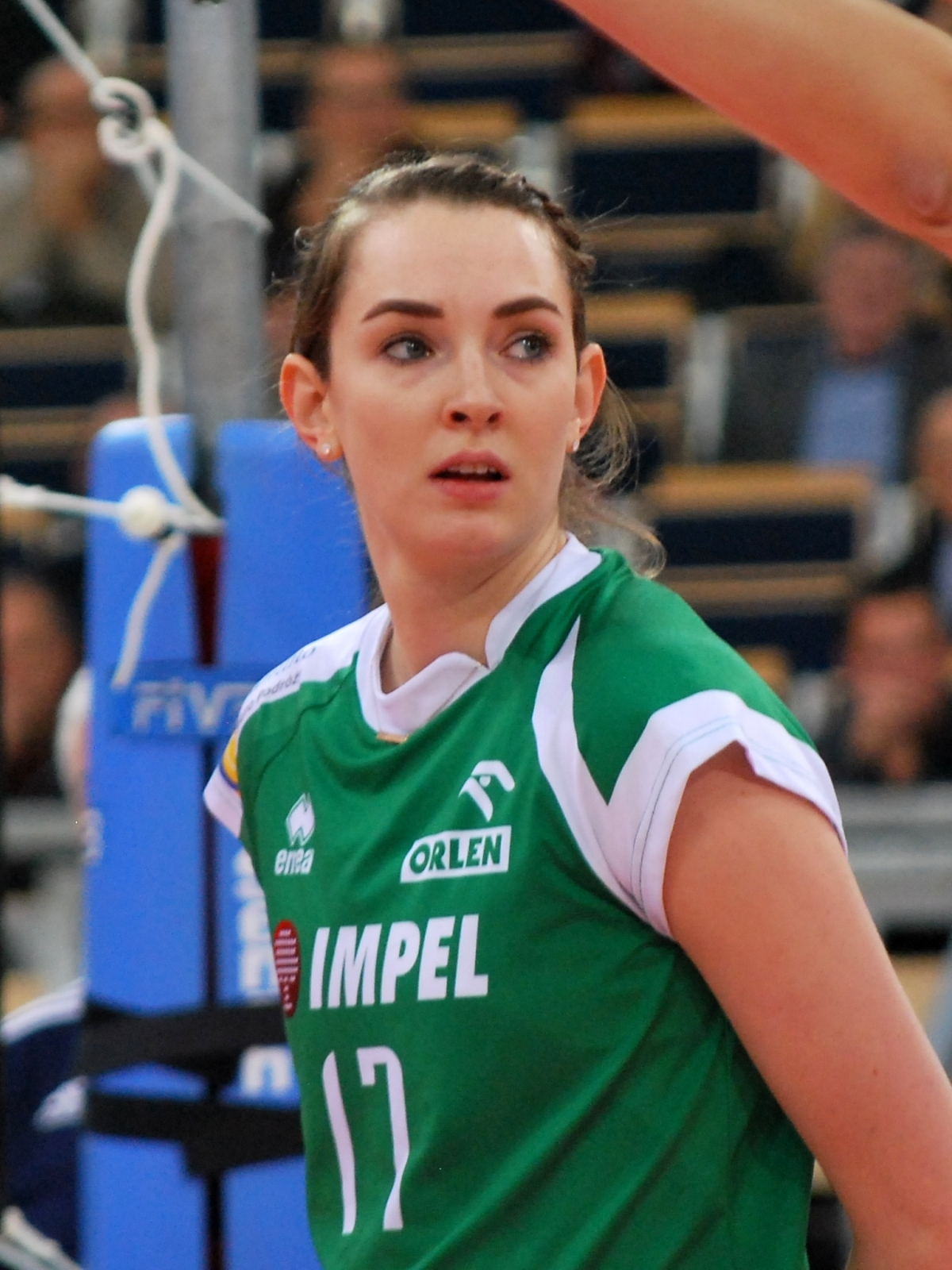
- Courtney in 2016

Personal information
- Full name: Megan Eileen Courtney
- Nationality: American
- Born: October 27, 1993 (age 33); Kettering, Ohio, U.S.
- Height: 1.85 m (6 ft 1 in)
- Weight: 61 kg (134 lb)
- Spike: 315 cm (124 in)
- Block: 300 cm (118 in)
- Education: Pennsylvania State University

Volleyball information
- Position: Outside hitter/Libero
- Current club: Columbus Fury
- Number: 17

Career
Years	Teams
2015-2016	(Puerto Rico) Leonas de Ponce
2016-2017	(Poland) Impel Wrocław
2017-2018	(Turkey) Çanakkale Belediyespor
2018-2019	(Italy) Volley Bergamo
2019-2020	(Italy) Igor Gorgonzola Novara
2020-2021	(Italy) Savino Del Bene Scandicci
2021-2022	(Italy) Prosecco Doc Imoco Volley Conegliano
2023-	(United States) Columbus Fury

National team
2016–2021	United States
Medal record
Women's volleyball
Representing the United States
World Cup
Silver medal – second place	2019 Japan	Team
FIVB Nations League
Gold medal – first place	2019 Nanjing	Team
Pan-American Cup
Gold medal – first place	2017 Cañete/Lima
Bronze medal – third place	2016 Santo Domingo

Megan Eileen Courtney-Lush (born October 27, 1993) is an American indoor professional volleyball player for the Columbus Fury of the Pro Volleyball Federation. She played college volleyball at Penn State, with whom she won back-to-back national championships in 2013 and 2014. She went on to play professionally for club teams in Puerto Rico, Poland, Turkey, and Italy.

Though she was as an outside hitter in college and during her club seasons, Courtney-Lush played as a libero during her time as a member of the United States women's national team. With the U.S., she participated at several international tournaments, most notably winning the 2019 FIVB Volleyball Women's Nations League, where she was named Best Libero. Courtney was named as an alternate to the 2020 USA Olympic Team.

== Career ==
=== Amateur ===
Courtney-Lush was a four-year varsity player at Archbishop Alter High School in Kettering, Ohio. In her freshman, junior, and senior seasons, she helped take her team to the state semifinals. She was named the 2011–2012 Ohio Gatorade Player of the Year.

She played college women's volleyball at Penn State, where in her freshman season she was the Big Ten Freshman of the Year as well as the AVCA Mideast Region Freshman of the Year. In her next two seasons, she helped Penn State to back-to-back NCAA titles. In the 2014 NCAA Tournament, she earned Most Outstanding Player honors after she recorded career-high 23 kills and 16 digs in the national semifinals win over Stanford. She had 11 kills and 14 digs in the NCAA Championship win over BYU. Courtney-Lush finished her college career with 1,154 kills on a .259 hitting percentage, 1,141 digs, and 364 blocks.

=== Professional ===
In 2016, Courtney-Lush signed her first professional contract at Leonas de Ponce in the Liga de Voleibol Superior Femenino. In the summer of 2016, she made her debut in the US women's national team. In 2017, she won the 2017 Women's Pan-American Volleyball Cup gold medal. In the 2016-17 season she arrived in Poland, where he plays the ORLEN Liga with the Impla of Breslavia. In the following season she played for Çanakkale, a Turkish Sultanlar league club.

In May 2021, she was named to team USA's 18-player roster for the FIVB Volleyball Nations League tournament. that was played May 25-June 24 in Rimini, Italy. Team USA would eventually win the gold medal after defeating Brazil in the finals. She was a selected as an Olympic alternate for the 2020 Summer Olympics.

After three seasons in teams of the Italian League, she joined Imoco Volley Conegliano as outside hitter. In her debut match with her new club she won her first professional title, the 2021 Italian Super Cup, and received the Most Valuable Player award.

After taking a hiatus from volleyball to have a child, Courtney-Lush returned to professional volleyball with the Columbus Fury for the Pro Volleyball Federation's inaugural 2024 season.

== Clubs ==
- (Puerto Rico) Leonas de Ponce (2015-2016)
- (Poland) Impel Wrocław (2016-2017)
- (Turkey) Çanakkale Belediyespor (2017-2018)
- (Italy) Volley Bergamo (2018-2019)
- (Italy) Igor Gorgonzola Novara (2019-2020)
- (Italy) Savino Del Bene Scandicci (2020-2021)
- (Italy) Prosecco Doc Imoco Volley Conegliano (2021-2022)
- (United States) Columbus Fury (2024-)

== Awards ==
=== Clubs ===
- 2021 Italian Supercup - Champions, with Imoco Volley Conegliano
- 2021-22 Italian Cup (Coppa Italia) - Champion, with Imoco Volley Conegliano

=== Individuals ===
- 2019 FIVB Nations League – "Best libero"
- 2021 Italian A1 League Super Cup – Most valuable player

== See also ==
- List of Pennsylvania State University Olympians
