= Emiliya Dimitrova =

Bulgarian volleyball player

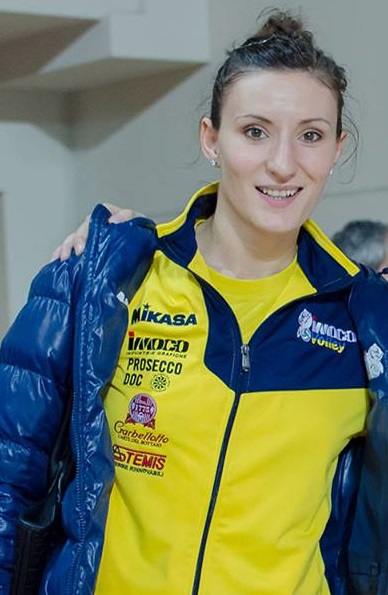

Personal information
- Nationality: Bulgaria
- Born: 26 December 1991 (age 34); Shumen
- Hometown: Sofia
- Height: 1.85 m (6 ft 1 in)
- Weight: 70 kg (154 lb)
- Spike: 310 cm (122 in)
- Block: 290 cm (114 in)

Volleyball information
- Position: opposite
- Current club: Grand Rapids Rise
- Number: 14

Career
Teams
- (Bulgaria) Slavia Sofia (2007–2009)
- (Italy) Spes Volley Conegliano (2010–2011)
- (Romania) C.S. Volei 2004 Tomis Constanța (Jan 2011 – May 2011)
- (Italy) Spes Volley Conegliano (2011–2012)
- (Turkey) Yeşilyurt Istanbul (Jan 2012 – May 2012)
- (Italy) Imoco Conegliano (2012–2015)
- (Italy) Pallavolo Scandicci (2015–2016)
- (Japan) NEC Red Rockets (2016–2017)
- (Turkey) Bursa (2017–2018)
- (Romania) C.S.Targoviste (2018–2019)
- (Turkey) PTT Spor (2020–2021)
- (United States) Grand Rapids Rise (2024–)

Emiliya Dimitrova (Bulgarian: Емилия Димитрова; born Emiliya Nikolova 26 December 1991) is a Bulgarian volleyball player for the Grand Rapids Rise of the Pro Volleyball Federation and the Bulgaria women's national volleyball team.

She was part of the Bulgarian national team at the 2014 FIVB Volleyball Women's World Championship in Italy. and 2021 Women's European Volleyball League, winning a gold medal.

She played for Imoco Conegliano in 2014.

== Clubs ==
- (Bulgaria) Slavia Sofia (2007–2009)
- (Italy) Spes Volley Conegliano (2010–2011)
- (Romania) C.S. Volei 2004 Tomis Constanța (Jan 2011 – May 2011)
- (Italy) Spes Volley Conegliano (2011–2012)
- (Turkey) Yeşilyurt Istanbul (Jan 2012 – May 2012)
- (Italy) Imoco Conegliano (2012–2015)
- (Italy) Pallavolo Scandicci (2015–2016)
- (Japan) NEC Red Rockets (2016–2017)
- (Turkey) Bursa (2017–2018)
- (Romania) C.S.Targoviste (2018–2019)
- (Turkey) PTT Spor (2020–2021)
- (United States) Grand Rapids Rise (2024–)
