= Vegas Thrill =

American volleyball team

- Sport: Volleyball
- Founded: 2023
- League: Major League Volleyball
- Based in: Henderson, Nevada
- Arena: Lee's Family Forum
- Colors: Black, purple, blue, white
- Owner: Michael Landier
- Head coach: Rachel Morris
- Website: provolleyball.com/teams/vegas-thrill

The Vegas Thrill are a women's professional indoor volleyball team based in the Las Vegas metropolitan area that most recently competed in Pro Volleyball Federation, and are currently members of Major League Volleyball. The Thrill began play in the league's inaugural 2024 season. The team plays its home games at Lee's Family Forum. It has been on hiatus since the 2025 season, but have announced a return to play in the 2027 MLV season.

== History ==
On October 11, 2023, Las Vegas was announced as the seventh and final city to get a Pro Volleyball Federation franchise for the league's inaugural season, owned by local political leader Andy Abboud and former Nebraska Attorney General Jon Bruning. On that same day, former LSU Tigers women's beach volleyball coach Fran Flory was named as the team's inaugural head coach. The Thrill name, logo and colors were announced on November 29. On December 5, 2024, the Thrill announced that Rámon "Monchito" Hernandez Cruz would be the head coach for the 2025 season.

The Vegas Thrill then went on hiatus for the duration of the 2026 MLV season and did not compete that season. In August 2026, the team announced their return from hiatus and will compete in the 2027 Major League Volleyball competition. Rachel Morris will be the head coach for the 2027 MLV season.

== Roster ==
Current as of April 9, 2025.

Number	Player	Position	Height	College/Club
2	(United States) Charitie Luper	Outside hitter	5'9"	UCLA, Louisville
3	(United States) Kendall White	Libero	5'7"	Penn State
4	(United States) Willow Johnson	Opposite hitter	6'3"	Oregon
5	(United States) Morgan Stout	Middle blocker	6'1"	Wichita State
6	(United States) Alisha Glass Childress	Setter	6'0"	Penn State
7	(Canada) Layne Van Buskirk	Middle blocker	6'4"	Pittsburgh
8	(United States) Camryn Hannah	Outside hitter	6'2"	Clemson, Penn State
9	(United States) Grace Loberg	Outside hitter	6'3"	Wisconsin
10	(United States) Mary Shroll	Libero	5'8"	LMU, Arizona State
11	(United States) Hannah Maddux	Outside hitter	6'2"	South Alabama
12	(United States) Berkeley Oblad	Middle blocker	6'4"	Utah
13	(United States) Teagan DeFalco	Libero	5'7"	Grand Canyon
14	(United States) Adora Anae	Outside hitter	6'2"	Utah
15	(United States) Allison Mayfield	Outside hitter	6'1"	Kansas
17	(United States) Lauren Jardine	Opposite hitter	6'2"	Wisconsin, Utah
22	(United States) Carly Graham	Setter	6'0"	Rice
24	(United States) Syd Cole	Setter	5'10"	Northern Colorado
64	(United States) Sophie Davis	Middle blocker	6'2"	James Madison
91	(Germany) Saskia Hippe	Opposite hitter	6'1"	
