= Allison Mayfield =

American volleyball player (born 1989)

Personal information
- Nationality: American
- Born: October 3, 1989 (age 37); Kansas City, Kansas
- Height: 185 cm (6 ft 1 in)
- Education: University of Kansas

Volleyball information
- Position: Outside hitter
- Current club: (United States) Vegas Thrill
- Number: 15

Career
Years	Teams
2008-2011; 2012-2013; 2014-2015; 2015-2016; 2016-2017; 2017-2018; 2018; 2019; 2019-2020; 2024; 2025	(United States) University of Kansas (France) Clamart Volley-Ball (Switzerland) TSV Düdingen (Finland) LP Kangasala (Finland) HPK Hämeenlinna (Peru) CV Universidad de San Martín (Greece) Olympiacos Piraeus (Hungary) Fatum Nyíregyháza (Peru) CV Universidad de San Martín (United States) Omaha Supernovas (United States) Vegas Thrill

Allison Mayfield (born October 3, 1989) is an American volleyball player for the Vegas Thrill of the Pro Volleyball Federation.

== Sporting achievements ==
=== Clubs ===
Finnish Championship:

- 2017

Peru Championship:

- 2018

Hungarian Cup:

- 2019

Hungarian Championship:

- 2019
