= Grand Rapids Rise =

American volleyball team

- Sport: Volleyball
- Founded: 2022
- League: Major League Volleyball
- Based in: Grand Rapids, Michigan
- Arena: Van Andel Arena
- Colors: Elevation Red, Ascension Blue and Sunrise Gold
- Owner: Dan DeVos
- Head coach: Cathy George
- Website: grrise.com

The Grand Rapids Rise are a women's professional indoor volleyball team based in Grand Rapids, Michigan, that competes in Major League Volleyball (MLV). The Rise began play in the league's inaugural 2024 season. The team plays their home games at Van Andel Arena.

== History ==
On December 5, 2022, Grand Rapids was announced as the first city to get a Pro Volleyball Federation franchise for the league's inaugural season. Dan DeVos, majority owner of the National Basketball Association's Orlando Magic and American Hockey League's Grand Rapids Griffins and owner of the former Arena Football League team the Grand Rapids Rampage, was announced as the new team's owner. The Rise name, logo and colors were announced on April 14, 2023.

Their inaugural match was played against the Columbus Fury at Van Andel Arena. The Rise swept the Fury, winning by set scores of 25-17, 25-23, 25-19. The game was a sellout, with an attendance of 7,805.

== Broadcasters ==
The Rise's current flagship radio station is WMAX-FM (96.1 FM). Dan Hasty does play-by-play with Katie Olson on color commentary. TV Broadcasts can be viewed on a variety of outlets, including CBS Sports Network, The Roku Channel, and the Major League Volleyball YouTube channel. Locally, a small number of matches can be viewed on WXSP-TV; a sister station to WOOD TV8 and WOTV.

== Roster ==
Current as of February 2, 2026.

Number	Player	Position	College/Club	Height
1	(Colombia) Camila Gómez	Libero	Texas A&M	5'2"
3	(Romania) Elizabet Inneh	Opposite hitter		6'3"
4	(United States) Carli Snyder	Outside hitter	Florida	6'1"
7	(United States) Leah Meyer	Outside hitter	Duke	6'3"
9	(United States) Saige Ka'aha'aina-Torres	Setter	Utah/Texas	6'0"
10	(United States) Rhamat Alhassan	Middle blocker	Florida	6'4"
11	(United States) Lauren Jardine-Clark	Opposite hitter	Wisconsin/Utah	6'3"
12	(United States) Berkeley Oblad	Middle blocker	Utah	6'4"
13	(United States) Paige Briggs-Romine	Outside hitter	Western Kentucky	5'10"
15	(United States) Allison Mayfield	Outside hitter	Kansas	6'1"
17	(United States) Alyssa Jensen	Middle blocker	Michigan State	6'4"
20	(United States) Hattie Bray	Middle blocker	Marquette	6'2"
21	(United States) Alexis Shelton	Outside hitter	Oklahoma	6'2"
22	(United States) Camryn Turner	Setter	Kansas	5'8"
26	(United States) Morgan Hentz	Libero	Stanford	5'9"
33	(Spain) Candela Alonso-Corcelles	Outside hitter	Indiana	6'2"
