= Major League Volleyball (2026) =

Women's volleyball league in the United States

- Most recent season or competition: 2026 Major League Volleyball season
- Sport: Volleyball
- No. of teams: 12
- Country: United States
- Most recent champion: Dallas Pulse (2026)
- Broadcaster: Various
- Website: provolleyball.com

Major League Volleyball (MLV) is a professional women's indoor volleyball league in the United States. It is the continuation of the Pro Volleyball Federation (PVF), which commenced play in the 2024 season, and is one of three professional volleyball leagues for women in the United States alongside the AU Pro Volleyball Championship and LOVB Pro.

The current incarnation of the league originates from the attempted secession of the Omaha Supernovas from the PVF during the 2025 season, amid a dispute over the league's ownership. The team planned to establish a rival league that was to be called Major League Volleyball, with $100 million in funding from investors. At the end of the season, a peace deal was struck which prevented the secession, welcomed the investors into the league, and rebranded it as Major League Volleyball.

MLV currently consists of twelve independently owned franchises that annually compete in a regular season for spots in a playoff tournament that determines the league's champion. Three more franchises are planned to join in the future. Salaries ranging from $60,000 to $175,000 are offered to players, along with additional benefits and revenue sharing agreements. The league's matches are broadcast on the CBS Sports Network, Vice TV, The Roku Channel, ion, YouTube, and Victory+. As of its 2026 season, the current champions are the Dallas Pulse after they defeated the Omaha Supernovas in 5 sets.

On December 11 and 13, the MLV Champion and the LVSF Champion will play each other in Puerto Rico for the first time. Dallas Pulse and Santurce Cangrejeras will play in the first meeting between the two leagues.

== History ==
The logo of the Pro Volleyball Federation, the preceding incarnation of Major League Volleyball.

Major League Volleyball's (MLV) first incarnation, the Pro Volleyball Federation (PVF), was one of three professional women's volleyball leagues in the United States that commenced play in the 2020s, alongside the AU Pro Volleyball Championship and LOVB Pro. Its inaugural 2024 season was dominated by the success of the Omaha Supernovas, who earned the highest average attendance for a professional volleyball team in the world, broke the United States attendance record for a volleyball game thrice, and won the PVF Championship in straight sets against the Grand Rapids Rise. Off the court, the PVF came into conflict with the Supernovas over their attempted acquisition of the Vegas Thrill in August 2023, which was blocked by the league. By December, an attempt at a hostile takeover of the PVF itself by the Supernovas' owners was alleged to have started, inspiring PVF co-founders Dan Whinham and Stephen Evans to "resist" the takeover by selling $1 million in shares of the league to Rise owner Dan DeVos in February 2024.

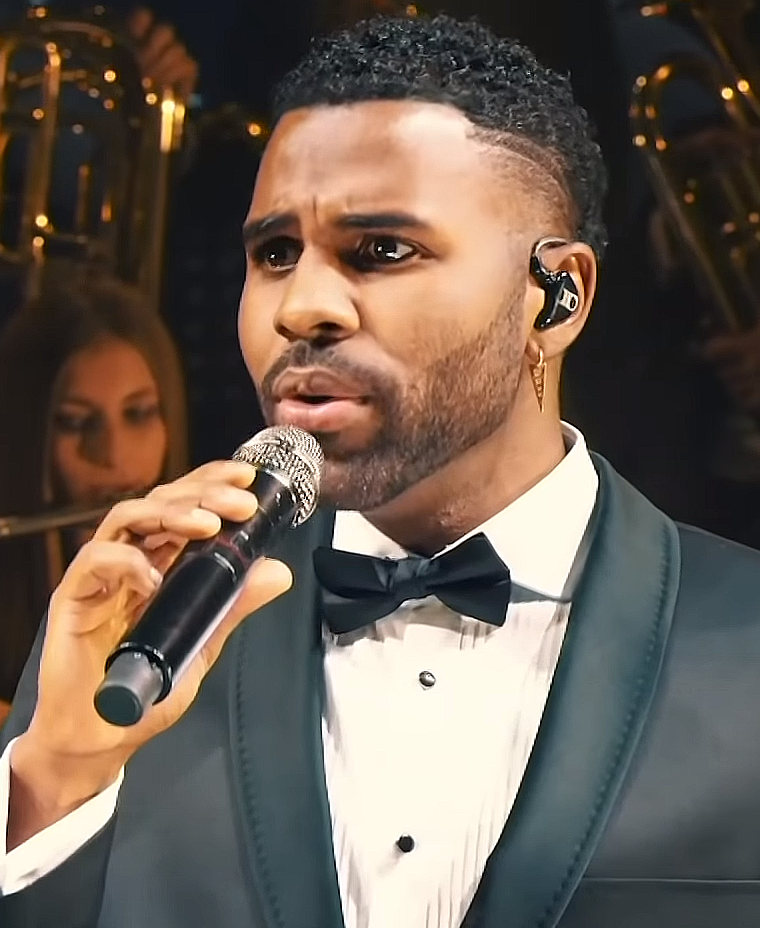
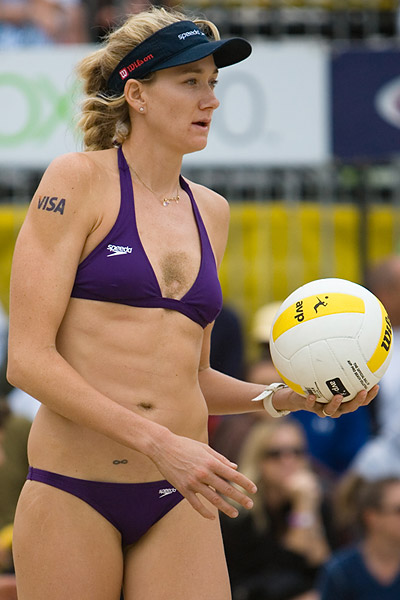
Jason Derulo (left) and Kerri Walsh Jennings (right) helped lead an attempt to establish a league rivalling the PVF.

Amid the escalating dispute, Supernovas co-owners Jason Derulo and Danny White, along with Benjamin Priest, Sacramento Kings owner Vivek Ranadivé, and three-time Olympic beach volleyball champion Kerri Walsh Jennings, began planning for a rival league with the Supernovas as a charter member, raising $100 million from investors. The group announced both the Supernovas' exit from the PVF, and the establishment of what was to be called Major League Volleyball, days into the 2025 season. Play was to commence in the 2026 season with at least ten independently owned franchises. Ranadivé was granted ownership of a franchise based in Sacramento. The states of California, Florida, Indiana, Kansas, Kentucky, Minnesota, Ohio, Tennessee, Washington, and Wisconsin were also considered as potential franchise bases.

The Supernovas played what was to be their final season in the PVF, falling short of a back-to-back championship with a playoff semifinal loss to the Indy Ignite. In August, the PVF and MLV struck a deal that saw the return of the Supernovas to a league rebranded as Major League Volleyball, and the admission of the Sacramento team as an expansion franchise, alongside the establishment of a new franchise based in Washington, D.C.

== Teams ==
As of its 2027 season, Major League Volleyball consists of twelve independently owned franchises. Six competed in the inaugural 2024 PVF season as charter franchises: the Atlanta Vibe, Columbus Fury, Grand Rapids Rise, Omaha Supernovas, Orlando Valkyries, and Vegas Thrill. The Indy Ignite, Dallas Pulse, MLV D.C., MLV Los Angeles, Minnesota Forge, and MLV Northern California entered as expansion teams over the following three seasons. The salary range for players in MLV is $60,000 to $175,000, with "benefits" worth $10,000, and an undisclosed amount of revenue sharing with their respective teams. Two players on each team are also paid an additional $40,000 to serve as the team's ambassadors.

=== List of teams ===
List of current MLV teams
Team	Location	Venue	Cap.	First
Atlanta Vibe	Duluth, Georgia	Gas South Arena	12,750	2024
Columbus Fury	Columbus, Ohio	Nationwide Arena	19,500	2024
Dallas Pulse	Frisco, Texas	Comerica Center	4,500	2026
DC Flight	Washington, D.C.	The Anthem	3,000	2027
Grand Rapids Rise	Grand Rapids, Michigan	Van Andel Arena	11,500	2024
Indy Ignite	Fishers, Indiana	Fishers Event Center	6,500	2025
Los Angeles Thunder	Los Angeles, California	Crypto.com Arena Honda Center	19,079 18,336	2027
Minnesota Forge	St. Paul, Minnesota	Grand Casino Arena	17,954	2027
NorCal Rumble	San Jose, California	Tech CU Arena	4,329	2027
Omaha Supernovas	Omaha, Nebraska	CHI Health Center	18,320	2024
Orlando Valkyries	Orlando, Florida	Addition Financial Arena	9,432	2024
Vegas Thrill	Henderson, Nevada	Lee's Family Forum	6,019	2024

List of former MLV teams
Team	Location	Venue	Cap.	First	Last
San Diego Mojo	San Diego, California	Viejas Arena	12,414	2024	2026

== Seasons ==
List of PVF/MLV seasons
Year	T	Pl	(gold) Champion	Runners-up
2026	8	28	Dallas Pulse	Omaha Supernovas
2025	8	28	Orlando Valkyries	Indy Ignite
2024	7	24	Omaha Supernovas	Grand Rapids Rise

== Broadcasting ==
The CBS Sports Network and Roku Sports Channel have broadcast the league since its inaugural season. For the 2026 season, Roku aired 21 matches, primarily on Thursday nights, the CBS Sports Network aired fifteen matches, the Scripps Sports Network aired twelve matches, Vice TV aired ten Sunday matches, Ion Television aired the playoffs, and CBS aired the All-Star Match. Matches not broadcast on national television were aired by local broadcasters and the league's YouTube channel. Dallas Pulse matches were exempt from this arrangement, with their non-nationally aired home games being broadcast on Victory+.

== See also ==
- Prominent women's sports leagues in the United States and Canada
- Professional sports leagues in the United States
- Major League Volleyball (1987)
