= Van Andel Arena =

Indoor arena in Grand Rapids, Michigan

- "The Freezer on Fulton"

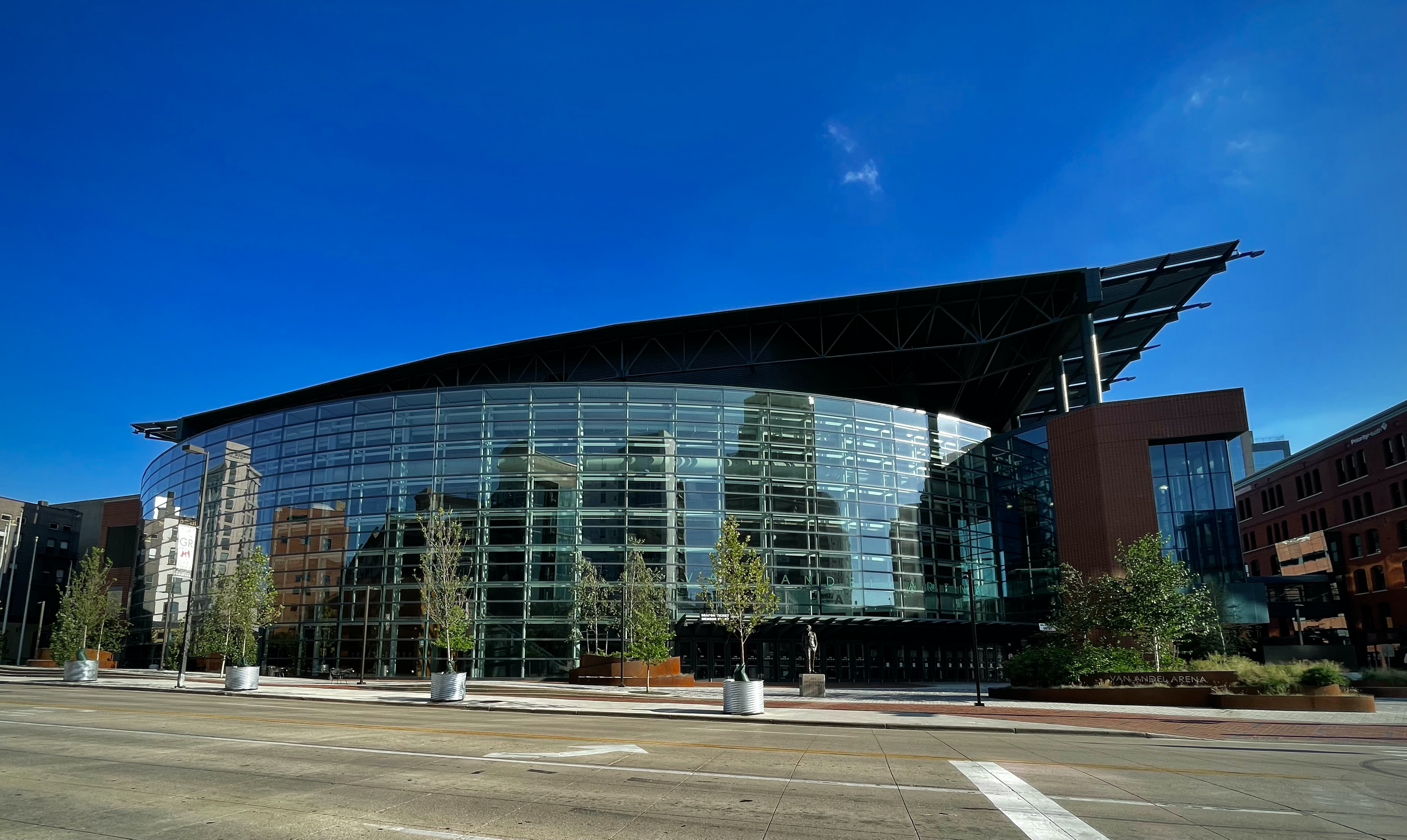
- Interactive map of Van Andel Arena
- Address: 130 West Fulton Street
- Location: Grand Rapids, Michigan, U.S.
- Coordinates: 42°57′44″N 85°40′19″W
- Owner: Grand Rapids-Kent County Convention/Arena Authority
- Operator: SMG
- Capacity: Concerts: 13,184; Basketball: 11,500; Ice hockey: 10,834; Arena football: 10,618

Construction
- Groundbreaking: February 8, 1995
- Opened: October 8, 1996
- Cost: $78 million ($160 million in 2025 dollars)
- Architect: Rossetti Architects
- Structural engineers: McClurg & Associates, Inc.
- Services engineer: URS Greiner, Inc./Henderson
- General contractor: Hunt/Erhardt Joint Venture

Tenants
- Grand Rapids Griffins (IHL/AHL) (1996–present); Grand Rapids Hoops (CBA) (1996–2001); Grand Rapids Rampage (AFL) (1998–2008); Grand Rapids Gold (NBAGL) (2022–present); Grand Rapids Rise (MLV) (2024–present)

Website
- vanandelarena.com

Van Andel Arena is a multi-purpose arena situated in the Heartside district of Grand Rapids, Michigan, United States. The arena attracted over five million patrons in its first 5 years, 1996–2001. It serves as the home of the Grand Rapids Griffins of the American Hockey League, the Grand Rapids Gold of the NBA G League, and the Grand Rapids Rise of Major League Volleyball. Seating 10,834 for ice hockey, 11,500 for basketball and up to 13,184 for concerts, Van Andel Arena is the fourth-largest arena in Michigan, as well as West Michigan's largest; only Little Caesars Arena in Detroit, the Jack Breslin Student Events Center in East Lansing, and Crisler Center in Ann Arbor are larger.

== Background ==
After a $78 million construction effort, the arena opened on October 8, 1996. The 12,000-plus seat arena is managed by ASM Global. It was named in recognition of the largest benefactors, Jay and Betty Van Andel.

Van Andel Arena is home to the Grand Rapids Griffins of the American Hockey League, the top minor league affiliate of the Detroit Red Wings, with fans giving it the nickname "The Freezer on Fulton". It is also home to the Grand Rapids Gold of the NBA G League, the minor league affiliate of the Denver Nuggets, and the Grand Rapids Rise of Major League Volleyball.

The arena was the home court of the now defunct Grand Rapids Hoops of the Continental Basketball Association from 1996 to 2001 and the Grand Rapids Rampage of the Arena Football League from 1998 to 2008.

It has hosted such acts as Taylor Swift, Bob Dylan, Tom Petty, Eric Clapton, Pearl Jam, Justin Bieber, Green Day, Metallica, Phish, Slipknot, Jack White, Bruce Springsteen, Paul McCartney, Phil Collins, Fall Out Boy, Eagles, Barenaked Ladies, Britney Spears, Janet Jackson, Aerosmith, Ariana Grande, Elton John, Lady Gaga, Demi Lovato, Miley Cyrus, Hannah Montana, Twenty One Pilots, Tate McRae, Jonas Brothers, Roger Waters, The Who, Kiss, Mötley Crüe, Red Hot Chili Peppers, Avenged Sevenfold, Rush, Megan Moroney, TLC, Marilyn Manson, Kenny Chesney, Linkin Park, OneRepublic, Kid Rock, Katy Perry, P!nk, Alex Warren, TobyMac, Trans-Siberian Orchestra, Panic! At The Disco, Phoebe Bridgers, For King & Country, Newsboys, Morgan Wallen, The Harlem Globetrotters, World Wrestling Entertainment, All Elite Wrestling, Disney, Disney on Ice, Monster Jam, NCAA Hockey Regional Championships, the AFL ArenaBowl XV game, professional boxing and basketball exhibition games for the Detroit Pistons, Michigan State University Basketball & Grand Valley State University. It also hosted the 2001 Big Ten women's basketball tournament.

On October 20, 2001, during a show co-headlining with Slipknot, System of a Down bassist Shavo Odadjian was assaulted, racially profiled and escorted out of the arena by security guards working for DuHadway Kendall. He filed a lawsuit in 2003.

On July 20, 2024, former and future president Donald Trump held his first rally in the arena after an assassination attempt one week earlier. He also held the final rally of his 2024 presidential campaign in the arena on November 4 of that year. He similarly ended both his 2016 and 2020 presidential campaigns at Van Andel as well.

== Description ==
As a concert venue, the Van Andel Arena seats 12,858 for end-stage shows, and 13,184 for center-stage shows. The arena floor measures 85 by 220 feet (26 m × 67 m) and features 9,886 permanent seats, of which 1,800 are club seats and 44 luxury suites, with the 16 luxury suites in the upper bowl seating 20 each, and the lower 24 bowls seating 15, and the others at 18. In addition, there are 1,300 retractable seats.

For Grand Rapids Griffins ice hockey games, the arena has a capacity of 10,834.

== In popular culture ==
The arena and Grand Rapids Griffins are featured briefly in a sketch on the comedy show Nick Swardson's Pretend Time, in which Nick attempts to propose but is instead repeatedly hit in the face with hockey pucks.

The arena was where Mötley Crüe shot their 2005 Carnival of Sins DVD and was also the setting for System of a Down's 2005 music video for their single, "Hypnotize".
