= Gas South Arena =

Indoor arena in Duluth, Georgia, U.S.

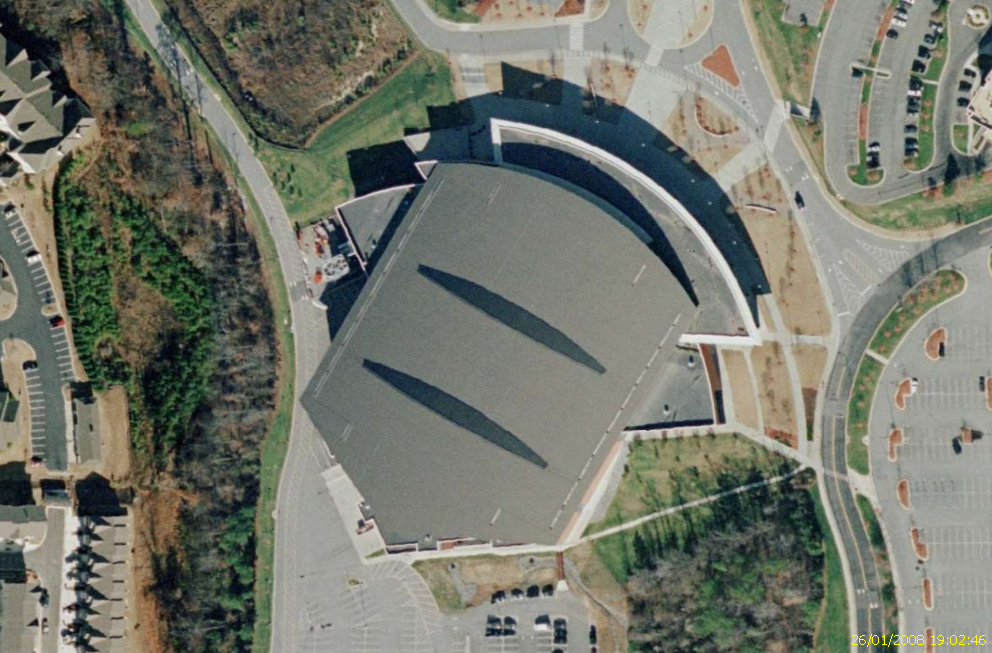
- Aerial view of arena (c.2008)

- Location within Georgia Location within the United States
- Former names: Gwinnett Civic Center Arena (2003–04); The Arena at Gwinnett Center (2004–15); Infinite Energy Arena (2015–21)
- Address: 6400 Sugarloaf Parkway
- Location: Duluth, Georgia, U.S.
- Coordinates: 33°59′29″N 84°5′39″W
- Owner: Gwinnett County
- Capacity: 13,100 Sports: Ice hockey: 11,355; Lacrosse: 10,500; Basketball: 12,750

Construction
- Groundbreaking: June 26, 2001
- Opened: February 16, 2003
- Cost: $91.5 million ($166 million in 2025 dollars)
- Architect: Rosser International
- Project manager: National Sports Services
- Structural engineer: Walter P Moore
- General contractor: Holder Construction Co.

Tenants
- Gwinnett/Atlanta Gladiators (ECHL) (2003–present); Georgia Swarm (NLL) (2016–present); Georgia Force (AFL) (2003–2004, 2008, 2011–2012); Georgia Tech Yellow Jackets (NCAA) (2011–2012); Atlanta Steam (LFL) (2013–2019); Atlanta Empire (X League) (2022–present); Atlanta Vibe (MLV) (2024–present)

Website
- Venue Website

The Gas South Arena (originally known as the Gwinnett Civic Center Arena, later known as The Arena at Gwinnett Center and Infinite Energy Arena) is an indoor arena in Gwinnett County, Georgia. It is located approximately 30 miles (48 km) northeast of Atlanta. The arena is one of the many venues within the "Gas South District", which also includes a convention center with an events hall and a performing arts center.

It is the home of the ECHL's Atlanta Gladiators and the Georgia Swarm, a professional box lacrosse team in the National Lacrosse League.

== Events ==
=== Sports ===
- The arena's first event was an arena football game, featuring the Georgia Force – February 16, 2003 The Force played here a total of five seasons, 2003–04, 2008, and 2011–12.
- Atlanta Gladiators (2003–present) Known as the Gwinnett Gladiators from 2003 to 2015, before changing to their current name.
- The Georgia High School Basketball State Championships – 2004–present
- Georgia High School Wrestling State Championships – 2004–present
- Georgia Swarm, National Lacrosse League franchise playing since 2016
- Professional Bull Riders Challenger Tour Championship (Built Ford Tough Series event) – November 20–22, 2009
- 2010 SEC women's basketball tournament – March 4–7, 2010
- 2013 WNBA Finals – October 10, 2013
- Kellogg's Tour of Gymnastics Champions – October 29, 2016
- Fan Controlled Football Season v1.0 – February 13-March 27, 2021
- Monster Jam Labor Day Weekend, 2024
- 2026 ACC women's basketball tournament – March 4–8, 2026

=== Professional wrestling ===
- World Lucha Libre League – March 28, 2004
- WWE's Armageddon – December 12, 2004
- TNA's Bound for Glory – October 14, 2007
- WWE's Starrcade – December 1, 2019
- AEW Dynamite and AEW Rampage – December 1, 2021; March, 6, 2024
- AEW Fyter Fest Week 2 – July 20, 2022

=== Mixed martial arts ===
- Bellator 88: Shlemenko vs. Falcão MMA – February 7, 2013
- UFC Fight Night: Rockhold vs. Philippou – January 15, 2014

== Gallery ==
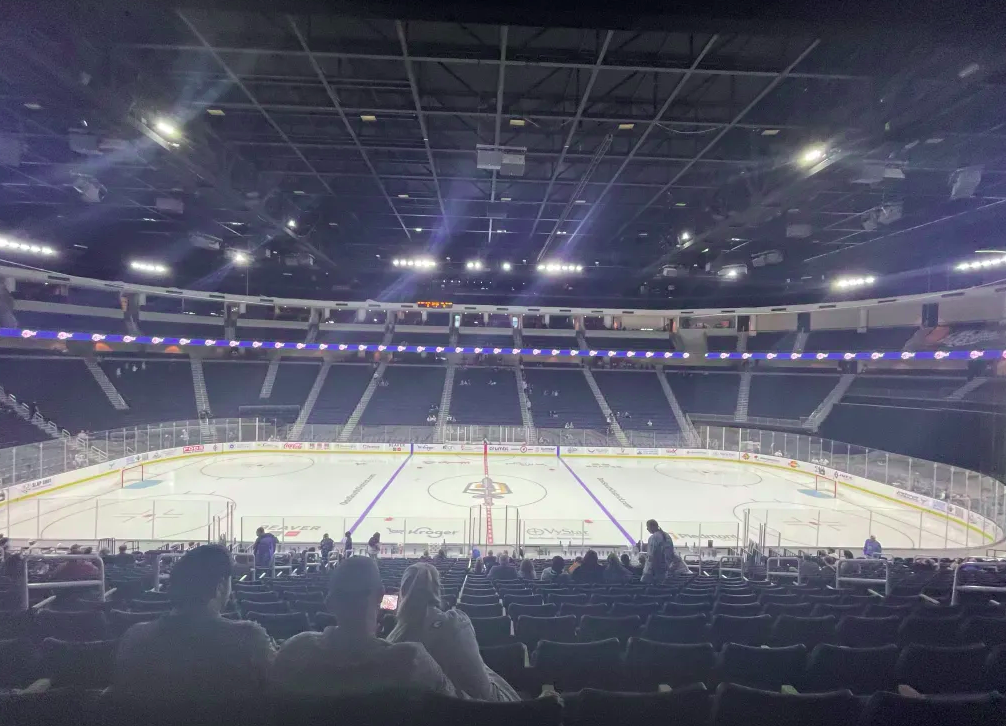
Gas South Arena Configured for hockey
