= Washington State Cougars women's volleyball =

College volleyball team

- Founded: 1973; 53 years ago
- University: Washington State University
- Athletic director: Jon Haarlow
- Head coach: Korey Schroeder (3rd season)
- Conference: Pac-12
- Location: Pullman, Washington, US
- Home arena: Bohler Gymnasium (capacity: 3,000)
- Nickname: Cougars
- Colors: Crimson and gray

AIAW/NCAA Regional Final
- 1996

AIAW/NCAA regional semifinal
- 1996, 1997, 2002, 2018, 2023

AIAW/NCAA tournament appearance
- 1977, 1991, 1993, 1994, 1995, 1996, 1997, 2000, 2001, 2002, 2009, 2016, 2017, 2018, 2019, 2020, 2021, 2022, 2023

The Washington State Cougars women's volleyball team is the team that competes as part of NCAA Division I, while representing Washington State University in the Pac-12 Conference. Washington State plays its home games at Bohler Gym.

== History ==
=== Early years ===
Washington State fielded their first volleyball team in 1973 as members of the Northwest College Women's Sports Association, a regional conference in the AIAW, under head coach Sue Durrant. The 1973 team would finish with a record of 14–12.

In 1977, under first-year head coach Marie Matsen, the team went 36-9 and made the 1977 AIAW volleyball championship regionals.

=== Cindy Fredrick Era (1989–2003) ===
The Cougars hired Cindy Fredrick as their next head coach in 1989 and made their first NCAA tournament in 1991 under coach Fredrick. They would end up losing in the first round to New Mexico. They continued this success under Fredrick by making five straight NCAA tournament appearances from 1993 to 1997, highlighted by the 1996 team making the regional finals and the 1997 team making the regional semifinals.

Fredrick lead the team to three more tournament appearances in 2000, 2001, and 2002. The 2002 team beat Oral Roberts, Kansas State, and Northern Iowa to reach the Elite Eight before falling to Florida.

Brian Heffernan replaced Cindy Fredrick as head coach after the 2003 season.

=== 2003–2015 ===
Washington State saw middling success from 2003 to 2015, making the NCAA tournament one time in 2009.

Former WSU volleyball player Jen Greeny became the Cougars head coach in 2011.

=== Modern era ===
Under coach Greeny, Washington State had returned to being a prominent program, making seven straight NCAA tournament appearances since 2016. In 2018 the Cougars made the Sweet 16 after beating Northern Arizona and Tennessee before falling to Number 1 seed Stanford.

== Conference membership ==
- Northwest College Women's Sports Association (1973–1979)
- Northwest Women's Volleyball League (1980–1981)
- Northern Pacific Athletic Conference (1982–1985)
- Pac-12 Conference (1986–present)

== Bohler Gym ==
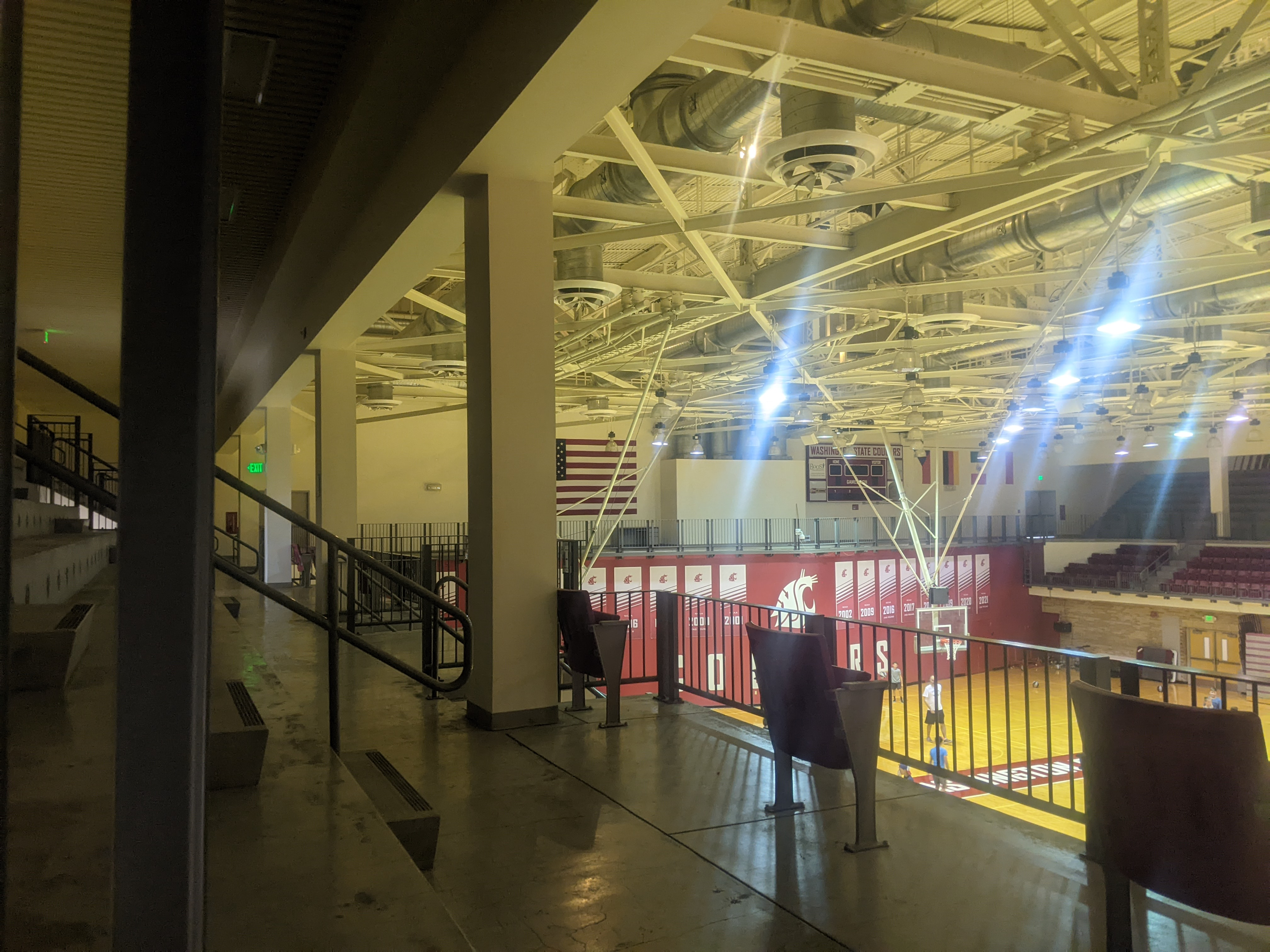
Bohler Gym interior

Washington State has played its home games at Bohler Gym since its first season in 1973. It is the only volleyball-specific arena in the Pac-12. The arena seats 3,000.

=== All-time attendance ===
No.	Date	Opponent	Site	Attendance
1	October 6, 1995	No. 4 Stanford	Bohler Gym	4,039
2	September 30, 1995	Idaho	Bohler Gym	3,356
3	October 15, 1994	Washington	Bohler Gym	3,276
4	November 22, 1996	No. 17 Washington	Bohler Gym	3,226
5	October 30, 1993	No. 6 Stanford	Bohler Gym	3,187
