= Atlanta Vibe =

Professional women's volleyball team

- Sport: Volleyball
- Founded: 2023
- League: Major League Volleyball
- Based in: Duluth, Georgia
- Arena: Gas South Arena
- Colors: Red and ice blue
- Owner: Colleen Durham Craig
- Head coach: Kayla Banwarth
- Website: atlantavibe.com

The Atlanta Vibe are a women's professional indoor volleyball team based in the Atlanta metropolitan area that competes in Major League Volleyball (MLV). The Vibe began play in the league's inaugural 2024 season. The team plays its home games at Gas South Arena.

== History ==
On February 15, 2023, it was announced that Atlanta would be one of the cities to get a Pro Volleyball Federation franchise for the league's inaugural season. The Vibe name, logo and colors were unveiled on August 4. The first match, of both the Vibe's season and the inaugural Pro Volleyball Federation, was played on January 24, 2024, at CHI Health Center Omaha, with the Vibe winning with Omaha Supernovas in five sets. The attendance mark of 11,624 set a record for both a women's professional volleyball match in the United States, and in the Pro Volleyball Federation(now Major League Volleyball). In the 2024 season, the Atlanta Vibe finished as the regular season champions, securing the No. 1 overall seed for the Pro Volleyball Federation Championship. However, in the semifinals, they were defeated by the Grand Rapids Rise, concluding their season as a top-four team in the 2024 PVF season.

== Roster ==
Current as of June 17, 2026.

Number	Player	Position	College/Club	Height
1	(United States) Taylor Smith	Outside hitter	Florida State/Arkansas	5'10"
	(United States) Gabrielle Benda	Setter	Georgia Tech/Marquette	5'11"
	(Poland) Karina Chmielewska	Setter		5'8"
15	(Jamaica) Aiko Jones	Opposite hitter	Louisville	6'2"
	(United States) Lauren Matthews	Opposite hitter	Western Kentucky	6'1"
	(United States) Kendra Dahlke	Outside hitter	Arizona	6'
13	(United States) Leah Edmond	Outside hitter	Kentucky	6'2"
	(Russia) Oksana Yakushina	Outside hitter		6'4"
22	(United States) Khori Louis	Middle blocker	Florida State	6'3"
	(United States) Anita Anwusi	Middle blocker	LSU	6'3"
	(Poland) Iga Wasilewska	Middle blocker		6'
	(United States) Courtney Jackson	Libero	Arkansas	5'8"
	(United States) Zoe Jarvis	Libero	Texas/UCLA/UC Santa Barbara	5'6"

=== Coaching staff ===
Name	Role
Kayla Banwarth	Head Coach
Laura Kuhn	General Manager & Assistant Coach
Beau Lawler	Assistant Coach
[Chip Smith]	Head Strength & Conditioning Coach
Sean Delfavero	Athletic Trainer
Emma Bezdicek	Manager of Volleyball Operations
