= Columbus Fury =

American volleyball team

- Sport: Volleyball
- Founded: 2023
- League: Major League Volleyball
- Based in: Columbus, Ohio
- Arena: Nationwide Arena
- Colors: Fury Red, Warrior Gold and Bold Pewter
- Owner: Andrea Mitchell and Andy Sandler
- Head coach: David Boos
- General manager: Eric Schulze
- Website: columbusfury.com

The Columbus Fury are a women's professional indoor volleyball team based in Columbus, Ohio, that competes in Major League Volleyball (MLV). The Fury began play in the league's inaugural 2024 season. The team plays their home games at Nationwide Arena.

== History ==
On February 17, 2023, it was announced that Columbus would be one of the cities to get a Pro Volleyball Federation franchise for the league's inaugural season. The Fury name, logo and colors were unveiled on April 12.

On November 13, 2023, it was announced that Cincinnati Bengals quarterback Joe Burrow, his father Jim Burrow and mother, Robin Burrow, was joining the Fury's ownership group. In March 2026, the team was acquired by Andrea Mitchell and Andy Sandler, who is in the ownership group of the Tampa Bay Rays and several minor league baseball teams.

== Roster ==
Current as of January 31, 2026.

Number	Player	Position	College/Club	Height
1	(United States) Rainelle Jones	Middle blocker	Maryland	6'3"
2	(United States) Maya Winterhoff	Middle blocker	Appalachian State	6'2"
3	(United States) Akasha Anderson	Outside hitter	Purdue	6'3"
7	(United States) Jaelyn Hodge	Outside hitter	Arizona	6'0"
8	(United States) Kamaile Hiapo	Libero	BYU	5'7"
10	(United States) Rachel Gomez	Middle blocker	Western Kentucky	6'1"
11	(United States) Audrey Pak	Setter	UCLA	5'11"
12	(Dominican Republic) Flormarie Heredia Colon	Outside hitter	Miami (FL)	6'0"
13	(United States) Ashley Evans	Setter	Purdue	6'1"
15	(Serbia) Aleksandra Jegdic	Libero		5'6"
16	(United States) Raina Terry	Outside hitter	Illinois	6'3"
17	(United States) Megan Courtney-Lush	Outside hitter	Penn State	6'1"
21	(United States) Regan Pittman-Nelson	Middle blocker	Minnesota	6'4"
22	(United States) Kashauna Williams	Opposite hitter	Penn State	6'1"
24	(United States) Abby Walker	Middle blocker	Cincinnati	6'1"

== Season-by-season results ==
Season	League	Finish	Wins	Losses	Win pct.	Playoffs
2024	PVF	5th	8	16	.333	Did not qualify
2025	PVF	8th	9	19	.321	Did not qualify
2026	MLV	8th	5	23	.179	Did not qualify
