= Pro Volleyball Federation =

Former women's volleyball league in the United States

- Sport: Volleyball
- First season: 2024
- Commissioner: Jen Spicher
- No. of teams: 7–8
- Country: United States
- Most titles: Omaha Supernovas (1); Orlando Valkyries (1)

The Pro Volleyball Federation (PVF) was the original incarnation of Major League Volleyball (MLV), a women's professional indoor volleyball league in the United States. The PVF was announced on November 17, 2022, and began play in 2024.

== History ==
=== Development ===
The Pro Volleyball Federation was announced on November 17, 2022 as a new professional women's league that focused on giving American players access to high level volleyball at home while also making a livable wage. The founders of the league include Super Bowl winning quarterback Trent Dilfer along with volleyball pioneers Cecile Reynaud and Laurie Corbelli. The league was initially expected to include ten teams but the league would lower the number to eight in later reports. The first franchise was awarded to a team in Grand Rapids, Michigan. In February 2023, it was announced that singer-songwriter Jason Derulo would team up to own a team that will be based out of Omaha, Nebraska. Atlanta, Georgia, was then announced as the second market, followed by Columbus, Ohio. The first 2025 franchise was awarded to a group led by Armand Sadoughi in July 2023 that will bring a team to Dallas, Texas.

=== About ===
The Pro Volleyball Federation is one of three independent leagues within the United States. Former athletes from the U.S. National Team, overseas, and recent college graduates have joined to play in the Pro Volleyball Federation. Prior to the season, a draft is held each November for graduating college players. Five players are selected for each team. In 2024, there were 40 athletes distributed among the eight teams.

The league's schedule runs from January through May. Each team aims to be one of the top four to have the chance to play in the championship game. In the final game, "Match for a Million", the winning team will be awarded $1 million.

=== First season ===
The league debuted with a match between the Atlanta Vibe and Omaha Supernovas on January 24, 2024, which set a record for attendance at a women's professional volleyball match in the United States of 11,624. Omaha would set a new attendance record a few week later when 12,090 fans saw the Supernovas win in four sets over the Orlando Valkyries.

The Omaha Supernovas became the first-ever Pro Volleyball Federation Champions after sweeping the Grand Rapids Rise on May 18, 2024 at the CHI Health Center in downtown Omaha in front of 10,678 fans.

=== Second season ===
The league's second season began on January 9, 2025 in Orlando. On January 10th, a match between the Omaha Supernovas and Atlanta Vibe set another new record for attendance at a women's professional volleyball match in the US, with 13,486 spectators.

The Indy Ignite made its debut as the first expansion team to launch, with its inaugural match taking place at Fishers Event Center on January 11th. From May 9th to May 11th, the championships were held. The four teams that competed in it were Omaha Supernovas, Indy Ignite, Atlanta Vibe, and Orlando Valkyries.

== Teams ==
- 1 Atlanta Vibe
- 2 Columbus Fury
- 3 Grand Rapids Rise
- 4 Indy Ignite
- 5 Omaha Supernovas
- 6 Orlando Valkyries
- 7 San Diego Mojo
- 8 Vegas Thrill

Each team is independently owned and operates in partnership with the league's centralized structure. Arena locations, coaching staff, and player rosters vary by team, with some franchise drawing national attention due to high-profile ownership or coaching hires.

=== Current ===
Overview of Pro Volleyball Federation teams
Team	Location	Venue	Capacity	Joined
Atlanta Vibe	Duluth, Georgia	Gas South Arena	12,750	2024
Columbus Fury	Columbus, Ohio	Nationwide Arena	19,500	2024
Grand Rapids Rise	Grand Rapids, Michigan	Van Andel Arena	11,500	2024
Indy Ignite	Fishers, Indiana	Fishers Event Center	6,500	2025
Omaha Supernovas	Omaha, Nebraska	CHI Health Center Omaha	18,320	2024
Orlando Valkyries	Orlando, Florida	Addition Financial Arena	9,432	2024
San Diego Mojo	San Diego, California	Viejas Arena	12,414	2024
Vegas Thrill	Henderson, Nevada	Lee's Family Forum	6,019	2024

== Playoffs ==
The 2025 Pro Volleyball Federation Playoffs were the second annual postseason tournament of the Pro Volleyball Federation (PVF). The playoffs featured four teams and took place from May 9 to May 11, 2025, at Lee's Family Forum in Henderson, Nevada. The Orlando Valkyries defeated the Indy Ignite in the championship match to claim their first league title.

=== Qualified teams ===
Seed	Team	Record	Clinched
1	Omaha Supernovas	21-7	No. 1 Seed
2	Atlanta Vibe	19-9	Home court advantage
3	Orlando Valkyries	18-10	Championship winner
4	Indy Ignite	13-15	Finals appearance

=== Match summaries ===
Semifinals-May 9, 2025

(4) Indy Ignite def. (1) Omaha Supernovas, 3-2

Set scores: 25-23, 20-25, 22-25, 26-24, 15-12

Indy Ignite defeated the league-leading Supernovas in a hard-fought five-set match, led by [Key Player]’s 18 kills and 5 digs.

(3) Orlando Valkyries def. (2) Atlanta Vibe, 3-1

Set Scores: 25-18, 25-23, 18-25, 25-16

Orlando advanced to the finals behind a dominant performance by [Key player], who contributed 21 kills and 4 blocks. The Valkyries took advantage of Atlanta's passing errors and forced early momentum.

=== Championships ===
The Omaha Supernovas and Orlando Valkyries have the most championships, with 1 PVF Finals win each.

Overview of PVF champions
Teams	Win	Loss	Total	Year(s) won	Year(s) runner-up
Omaha Supernovas	1	0	1	2024	—
Orlando Valkyries	1	0	1	2025	—
Grand Rapids Rise	0	1	1	2024	—
Indy Ignite	0	1	1	2025	—

== Broadcasting ==
Since 2024, CBS Sports is the primary broadcaster for the Pro Volleyball Federation. Matches primarily air on CBS Sports Network but CBS Sports has the option to air matches on the CBS broadcast network. For the 2025 season, the agreement was extended and expanded. CBS Sports Network will now air up to 20 matches, up from 10, and the CBS broadcast network will air at least one match per season.

Beginning 2025, Fox Sports became a broadcast partner. Four matches will air on FS1, while nine will air on FS2. The Roku Channel and VBTV also joined as streaming partners for the league.

== Salary ==
For 2025, the players' salary can range between $60,000 to $175,000, including benefits. Each of the players on the final roster will start out at $60,000. For the top players who play significantly for the team, they can earn up to $175,000, depending on how much they play. The league also gives individual awards to players that can range from $3,000 and $15,000.

== Awards ==
=== 2024 ===
Season awards
Name	Team	Award
Leah Edmond	Atlanta Vibe	Outside Hitter of the Year
Kaz Brown	Orlando Valkyries	Middle Blocker of the Year
Nootsara Tomkom	San Diego Mojo	Setter of the Year
Morgan Hentz	Atlanta Vibe	Libero of the Year
Emiliya Dimitrova	Grand Rapids Rise	Opposite Hitter of the Year
Bethania De La Cruz	Omaha Supernovas	Server of the Year
Alisha Glass Childress	Vegas Thrill	Most Inspirational Player
Reagan Cooper	Columbus Fury	Rising Star

==== All-League teams ====
===== First team =====
Leah Edmond, Atlanta Vibe

Morgan Hertz, Atlanta Vibe

Anna Lazareva, Atlanta Vibe

Claire Chaussee, Grand Rapids Rise

Emiliya Dimitrova, Grand Rapids Rise

Bethania De La Cruz, Omaha Supernovas

Brooke Nuneviller, Omaha Supernovas

===== Second team =====
Marlie Monserez, Atlanta Vibe

Reagan Cooper, Columbus Fury

Hristina Vuchkova, Omaha Supernovas

Vuchkova Brown, Orlando Valkyries

Kaz Stone, San Diego Mojo

Ronika Tomkom, San Diego Mojo

Alisha Glass Childress, Vegas Thrill

=== 2025 ===
Season awards
Name	Team	Award
Brooke Nuneviller	Omaha Supernovas	Outside Hitter of the Year
Ali Bastianelli	Grand Rapids Rise	Middle Blocker of the Year
Sydney Hilley	Indy Ignite	Setter of the Year
Morgan Hentz	Atlanta Vibe	Libero of the Year
Brittany Abercrombie	Orlando Valkyries	Opposite Hitter of the Year
Shara Venegas	San Diego Mojo	Most Inspirational Player
Khori Louis	Atlanta Vibe	Rising Star

==== All-League teams ====
===== First team =====
Leah Edmond, Atlanta Vibe

Morgan Hertz, Atlanta Vibe

Sydney Hilley, Indy Ignite

Azhani Tealer, Indy Ignite

Brooke Nuneviller, Omaha Supernovas

Brittany Abercrombie, Orlando Valkyries

Chomp Guedpard, Orlando Valkyries

===== Second team =====
Khori Louis, Atlanta Vibe

Marlie Monserez, Atlanta Vibe

Ali Bastianelli, Grand Rapids Rise

Carli Snyder, Grand Rapids Rise

Natalia Valentin-Anderson, Omaha Supernovas

Kaz Brown, Orlando Valkyries

Ronika Stone, San Diego Mojo

== See also ==
- National Volleyball Association
- Athletes Unlimited Volleyball (AUV)
- Volleyball in the United States
- International Volleyball Association
- Major League Volleyball (1987)
