= 2025 PVF season =

Second season of the Pro Volleyball Federation

2025 PVF Season
- League: Pro Volleyball Federation
- Sport: Volleyball
- Duration: January 9 – May 4 (Regular season)
- Games: 28
- Teams: 8
- TV partner(s): CBS Sports Network; FS1 / FS2; Roku; VBTV
- Season MVP: Brittany Abercrombie (Orlando)
- Finals champions: Orlando Valkyries
- Runners-up: Indy Ignite
- Finals MVP: Pornpun Guedpard (Orlando)

Seasons
- ← 2024 2026 →

The 2025 PVF Season is the second season of the Pro Volleyball Federation. The regular season began on January 9 and will end on May 4.

The league expanded to 8 teams with the debut of Indy Ignite.

== Transactions ==
=== Retirement ===
- On May 9, 2024, Emiliya Dimitrova announced her retirement after the inaugural PVF season. Dimitrova earned the Opposite Hitter of the Year Award and was named to the All-PVF First team in her only season with the Grand Rapids Rise.
- On June 29, 2024, the Omaha Supernovas announced that Jess Schaben-Lansman retired from professional volleyball to take a coaching role at Blair High School, a local high school north of Omaha.

=== Coaching changes ===
Pre-season
| Team | Departing Coach | New Coach | Reference |
|---|---|---|---|
| Atlanta Vibe | Todd Dagenais | Kayla Banwarth | |
| Indy Ignite | New team | George Padjen | |

== Draft ==
The draft was held on November 25. The new expansion Indy Ignite were awarded the first overall pick.

2025 Draft
| Rnd. | Pick # | Team | Player | Pos. | College | Notes |
|---|---|---|---|---|---|---|
| 1 | 1 | Atlanta Vibe | Merritt Beason | OPP | Nebraska | Traded from Indy Ignite |
| 1 | 2 | Indy Ignite | Anna DeBeer | OH | Louisville | Traded from Atlanta Vibe via Columbus Fury |
| 1 | 3 | Orlando Valkyries | Norah Sis | OH | Creighton | |
| 1 | 4 | Vegas Thrill | Camryn Hannah | OH | Penn State | |
| 1 | 5 | San Diego Mojo | Devyn Robinson | OPP | Wisconsin | |
| 1 | 6 | Atlanta Vibe | Khori Louis | MB | Florida State | |
| 1 | 7 | Grand Rapids Rise | Raven Colvin | MB | Purdue | |
| 1 | 8 | Omaha Supernovas | Toyosi Onabanjo | MB | Kansas | |
| 2 | 9 | Indy Ignite | Elena Scott | L | Louisville | Traded from Atlanta Vibe |
| 2 | 10 | Omaha Supernovas | Emily Londot | OPP | Ohio State | |
| 2 | 11 | Columbus Fury | Raina Terry | OH | Illinois | |
| 2 | 12 | Vegas Thrill | Mary Shroll | L | Arizona State | |
| 2 | 13 | Grand Rapids Rise | Naya Shime | OPP | SMU | |
| 2 | 14 | Orlando Valkyries | Natalie Foster | MB | SMU | |
| 2 | 15 | Omaha Supernovas | Ally Batenhorst | OH | USC | Traded from San Diego Mojo |
| 2 | 16 | Indy Ignite | CC Crawford | MB | Wisconsin | |
| 3 | 17 | Orlando Valkyries | Lydia Grote | OPP | Minnesota | |
| 3 | 18 | Columbus Fury | Kaylee Cox | OH | Western Kentucky | |
| 3 | 19 | Omaha Supernovas | Lindsay Krause | OH | Nebraska | |
| 3 | 20 | Indy Ignite | Taylor Trammell | MB | Penn State | |
| 3 | 21 | Atlanta Vibe | Taylor Head | OH | Florida State | |
| 3 | 22 | Grand Rapids Rise | Camryn Turner | S | Kansas | |
| 3 | 23 | San Diego Mojo | Maya Tabron | OH | SMU | |
| 3 | 24 | Vegas Thrill | Charitie Luper | OH | Louisville | |
| 4 | 25 | Vegas Thrill | Morgan Stout | MB | Wichita State | |
| 4 | 26 | San Diego Mojo | Leyla Blackwell | MB | Nebraska | |
| 4 | 27 | Atlanta Vibe | Mia Tuaniga | S | USC | |
| 4 | 28 | Indy Ignite | Nina Cajic | OH | Tennessee | |
| 4 | 29 | Grand Rapids Rise | Elena Oglivie | L | Stanford | |
| 4 | 30 | Omaha Supernovas | Valerie Vazquez Gomez | OH | Pittsburgh | |
| 4 | 31 | Orlando Valkyries | Anna Smrek | OPP | Wisconsin | |
| 4 | 32 | Columbus Fury | Abby Walker | MB | Cincinnati | |
| 5 | 33 | Indy Ignite | Isabel Martin | OH | Florida | |
| 5 | 34 | San Diego Mojo | Elise McGhee | OH | Baylor | |
| 5 | 35 | Vegas Thrill | Lauren Jardine | OH | Utah | |
| 5 | 36 | Columbus Fury | Kate Georgiades | L | Houston | |
| 5 | 37 | Omaha Supernovas | Kendra Wait | S | Creighton | |
| 5 | 38 | Atlanta Vibe | Bianca Bertolino | OH | Georgia Tech | |
| 5 | 39 | Orlando Valkyries | Nalani Iosia | L | Michigan State | |
| 5 | 40 | Grand Rapids Rise | Jess Mruzik | OH | Penn State | |

== Regular season ==
=== Standings ===
| # | Team | GP | W | L | PCT | Home | Road | SW | SL | SR | PS | PA |
|---|---|---|---|---|---|---|---|---|---|---|---|---|
| 1 | Omaha Supernovas | 28 | 21 | 7 | .750 | 10–4 | 11–3 | 67 | 35 | .657 | 2,359 | 2,259 |
| 2 | Atlanta Vibe | 28 | 19 | 9 | .679 | 10–4 | 9–5 | 65 | 48 | .575 | 2,240 | 2,123 |
| 3 | Orlando Valkyries | 28 | 18 | 10 | .643 | 9–5 | 9–5 | 67 | 43 | .609 | 2,492 | 2,330 |
| 4 | Indy Ignite | 28 | 13 | 15 | .464 | 8–6 | 5–9 | 58 | 58 | .500 | 2,589 | 2,573 |
| 5 | Grand Rapids Rise | 28 | 11 | 17 | .393 | 6–8 | 5–9 | 51 | 61 | .455 | 2,480 | 2,474 |
| 6 | San Diego Mojo | 28 | 11 | 17 | .393 | 7–7 | 4–10 | 48 | 63 | .432 | 2,406 | 2,501 |
| 7 | Vegas Thrill | 28 | 10 | 18 | .357 | 6–8 | 4–10 | 43 | 69 | .384 | 2,351 | 2,543 |
| 8 | Columbus Fury | 28 | 9 | 19 | .321 | 6–8 | 3–11 | 44 | 66 | .400 | 2,327 | 2,498 |

Notes

(#) – League Standing
x – Clinched playoff berth
e – Eliminated from postseason contention
Source: Standings

=== Schedule ===
2025 PVF regular season
January

| Date | Time (ET) | Matchup | | | TV | Set 1 | Set 2 | Set 3 | Set 4 | Set 5 | Attendance | Location |
|---|---|---|---|---|---|---|---|---|---|---|---|---|
| Thursday, January 9 | 7:00 p.m. | San Diego | 0–3 | Orlando | FS2 | 18–25 | 18–25 | 22–25 | | | 2,587 | Addition Financial Arena |
| Friday, January 10 | 8:00 p.m. | Atlanta | 2–3 | Omaha | VBTV | 25–22 | 19–25 | 25–22 | 22–25 | 13–15 | 13,486 | CHI Health Center |
| Friday, January 10 | 10:00 p.m. | Grand Rapids | 2–3 | Vegas | YouTube | 25–20 | 25–20 | 22–25 | 21–25 | 14–16 | 4,179 | Lee's Family Forum |
| Saturday, January 11 | 7:00 p.m. | San Diego | 3–1 | Columbus | YouTube | 25–18 | 21–25 | 25–19 | 25–22 | | 6,290 | Nationwide Arena |
| Saturday, January 11 | 7:00 p.m. | Orlando | 1–3 | Indy | YouTube | 25–13 | 19–25 | 17–25 | 21–25 | | 6,089 | Fishers Event Center |
| Sunday, January 12 | 6:00 p.m. | Omaha | 3–0 | Grand Rapids | FS1 | 25–21 | 25–23 | 25–22 | | | 8,706 | Van Andel Arena |
| Sunday, January 12 | 8:00 p.m. | Atlanta | 3–0 | Vegas | YouTube | 25–13 | 25–22 | 25–20 | | | 3,358 | Lee's Family Forum |
| Thursday, January 16 | 7:00 p.m. | Columbus | 2–3 | Atlanta | YouTube | 23–25 | 25–19 | 18–25 | 25–22 | 14–16 | 2,007 | Gas South Arena |
| Thursday, January 16 | 7:00 p.m. | Grand Rapids | 0–3 | Indy | YouTube | 18–25 | 26–28 | 16–25 | | | 4,035 | Fishers Event Center |
| Thursday, January 16 | 10:05 p.m. | Orlando | 3–1 | San Diego | YouTube | 25–23 | 20–25 | 25–17 | 25–15 | | 3,963 | Viejas Arena |
| Friday, January 17 | 10:00 p.m. | Omaha | 2–3 | Vegas | VBTV | 25–23 | 25–17 | 24–26 | 17–25 | 11–15 | 1,571 | Lee's Family Forum |
| Saturday, January 18 | 7:00 p.m. | Indy | 3–2 | Columbus | CBSSN | 25–18 | 32–30 | 19–25 | 22–25 | 15–11 | 5,043 | Nationwide Arena |
| Sunday, January 19 | 4:00 p.m. | San Diego | 3–1 | Omaha | YouTube | 20–25 | 25–19 | 25–22 | 25–22 | | 12,723 | CHI Health Center |
| Sunday, January 19 | 6:00 p.m. | Grand Rapids | 3–0 | Atlanta | FS1 | 25–23 | 25–23 | 25–21 | | | 2,305 | Gas South Arena |
| Sunday, January 19 | 8:00 p.m. | Orlando | 2–3 | Vegas | YouTube | 25–22 | 23–25 | 25–14 | 21–25 | 12–15 | 986 | Lee's Family Forum |
| Thursday, January 23 | 7:00 p.m. | Vegas | 1–3 | Atlanta | YouTube | 23–25 | 25–16 | 20–25 | 19–25 | | 1,518 | Gas South Arena |
| Friday, January 24 | 7:00 p.m. | Omaha | 3–0 | Columbus | YouTube | 25–17 | 25–15 | 25–19 | | | 3,161 | Nationwide Arena |
| Friday, January 24 | 10:05 p.m. | Indy | 1–3 | San Diego | YouTube | 25–18 | 17–25 | 28–30 | 19–25 | | 1,538 | Viejas Arena |
| Sunday, January 26 | 2:00 p.m. | Grand Rapids | 3–2 | Columbus | YouTube | 19–25 | 18–25 | 25–19 | 25–14 | 15–12 | 2,375 | Nationwide Arena |
| Sunday, January 26 | 6:00 p.m. | Vegas | 3–1 | Orlando | FS1 | 15–25 | 25–23 | 25–17 | 25–22 | | 1,486 | Addition Financial Arena |
| Thursday, January 30 | 7:00 p.m. | Orlando | 2–3 | Grand Rapids | YouTube | 26–24 | 15–25 | 25–17 | 18–25 | 12–15 | 2,596 | Van Andel Arena |
| Thursday, January 30 | 10:05 p.m. | Atlanta | 3–1 | San Diego | YouTube | 25–15 | 24–26 | 25–17 | 25–20 | | 865 | Viejas Arena |
| Friday, January 31 | 8:00 p.m. | Columbus | 0–3 | Omaha | YouTube | 21–25 | 18–25 | 17–25 | | | 11,712 | CHI Health Center |
| Friday, January 31 | 10:00 p.m. | Indy | 2–3 | Vegas | YouTube | 25–18 | 25–21 | 22–25 | 12–25 | 9–15 | 2,761 | Lee's Family Forum |

February

| Date | Time (ET) | Matchup | | | TV | Set 1 | Set 2 | Set 3 | Set 4 | Set 5 | Attendance | Location |
|---|---|---|---|---|---|---|---|---|---|---|---|---|
| Sunday, February 2 | 3:00 p.m. | Omaha | 0–3 | Orlando | YouTube | 22–25 | 18–25 | 20–25 | | | 1,362 | Addition Financial Arena |
| Sunday, February 2 | 4:00 p.m. | San Diego | 0–3 | Grand Rapids | YouTube | 19–25 | 22–25 | 22–25 | | | 4,482 | Van Andel Arena |
| Sunday, February 2 | 6:00 p.m. | Columbus | 0–3 | Indy | FS2 | 20–25 | 20–25 | 17–25 | | | 4,610 | Fishers Event Center |
| Sunday, February 2 | 8:00 p.m. | Atlanta | 1–3 | Vegas | YouTube | 23–25 | 23–25 | 25–19 | 19–25 | | 1,740 | Lee's Family Forum |
| Thursday, February 6 | 7:00 p.m. | Orlando | 3–0 | Atlanta | YouTube | 25–14 | 25–18 | 25–23 | | | 1,220 | Gas South Arena |
| Thursday, February 6 | 7:00 p.m. | Omaha | 3–0 | Indy | YouTube | 25–23 | 25–23 | 25–22 | | | 3,170 | Fishers Event Center |
| Friday, February 7 | 7:00 p.m. | Grand Rapids | 2–3 | Columbus | YouTube | 25–21 | 21–25 | 24–26 | 25–22 | 8–15 | 2,952 | Nationwide Arena |
| Friday, February 7 | 10:05 p.m. | Vegas | 3–0 | San Diego | YouTube | 25–22 | 25–19 | 25–20 | | | 1,547 | Viejas Arena |
| Saturday, February 8 | 7:00 p.m. | Omaha | 3–1 | Atlanta | YouTube | 25–23 | 25–10 | 19–25 | 25–22 | | 2,174 | Gas South Arena |
| Saturday, February 8 | 7:00 p.m. | Indy | 3–1 | Orlando | FS2 | 28–26 | 19–25 | 21–25 | 20–25 | | 1,479 | Addition Financial Arena |
| Wednesday, February 12 | 7:00 p.m. | Orlando | 3–1 | Columbus | YouTube | 15–25 | 26–24 | 25–18 | 25–20 | | 2,141 | Nationwide Arena |
| Thursday, February 13 | 7:00 p.m. | Atlanta | 3–1 | Grand Rapids | YouTube | 21–25 | 25–18 | 25–22 | 25–19 | | 2,256 | Van Andel Arena |
| Thursday, February 13 | 7:00 p.m. | San Diego | 1–3 | Indy | YouTube | 21–25 | 14–25 | 25–18 | 15–25 | | 2,879 | Fishers Event Center |
| Saturday, February 15 | 7:00 p.m. | Grand Rapids | 0–3 | Orlando | YouTube | 18–25 | 23–25 | 24–26 | | | 1,668 | Addition Financial Arena |
| Sunday, February 16 | 4:00 p.m. | San Diego | 0–3 | Omaha | YouTube | 21–25 | 19–25 | 18–25 | | | 12,768 | CHI Health Center |
| Sunday, February 16 | 6:00 p.m. | Indy | 2–3 | Atlanta | CBSSN | 30–28 | 19–25 | 18–25 | 25–22 | 13–15 | 2,058 | Gas South Arena |
| Monday, February 17 | 6:00 p.m. | Vegas | 1–3 | Columbus | YouTube | 20–25 | 20–25 | 25–22 | 21–25 | | 2,581 | Nationwide Arena |
| Thursday, February 20 | 7:00 p.m. | Atlanta | 1–3 | Indy | YouTube | 25–16 | 20–25 | 11–25 | 20–25 | | 2,856 | Fishers Event Center |
| Thursday, February 20 | 7:00 p.m. | Vegas | 0–3 | Orlando | YouTube | 15–25 | 21–25 | 17–25 | | | 868 | Addition Financial Arena |
| Thursday, February 20 | 7:00 p.m. | Columbus | 3–2 | Grand Rapids | YouTube | 16–25 | 27–25 | 22–25 | 25–22 | 15–13 | 2,181 | Van Andel Arena |
| Thursday, February 20 | 10:05 p.m. | Omaha | 3–1 | San Diego | YouTube | 22–25 | 25–20 | 25–16 | 29–27 | | 1,038 | Viejas Arena |
| Sunday, February 23 | 2:00 p.m. | Atlanta | 0–3 | Columbus | YouTube | 19–25 | 20–25 | 23–25 | | | 3,086 | Nationwide Arena |
| Thursday, February 27 | 8:00 p.m. | Indy | 3–1 | Vegas | FS2 | 25–23 | 14–25 | 25–18 | 25–16 | | 2,945 | Fishers Event Center |
| Thursday, February 27 | 8:00 p.m. | Orlando | 3–0 | Omaha | YouTube | 26–24 | 25–18 | 26–24 | | | 8,010 | CHI Health Center |
| Thursday, February 27 | 10:05 p.m. | Grand Rapids | 1–3 | San Diego | YouTube | 11–25 | 25–18 | 23–25 | 21–25 | | 1,220 | Viejas Arena |

March

| Date | Time (ET) | Matchup | | | TV | Set 1 | Set 2 | Set 3 | Set 4 | Set 5 | Attendance | Location |
|---|---|---|---|---|---|---|---|---|---|---|---|---|
| Saturday, March 1 | 7:00 p.m. | Atlanta | 2–3 | Orlando | YouTube | 17–25 | 18–25 | 25–15 | 25–19 | 13–15 | 2,055 | Addition Financial Arena |
| Saturday, March 1 | 9:05 p.m. | Columbus | 1–3 | San Diego | YouTube | 25–20 | 16–25 | 15–25 | 22–25 | | 1,452 | Viejas Arena |
| Sunday, March 2 | 4:00 p.m. | Indy | 0–3 | Omaha | YouTube | 19–25 | 23–25 | 25–27 | | | 9,523 | CHI Health Center |
| Sunday, March 2 | 6:00 p.m. | Grand Rapids | 3–0 | Vegas | CBSSN | 25–18 | 25–17 | 25–23 | | | 1,741 | Lee's Family Forum |
| Wednesday, March 5 | 7:00 p.m. | Omaha | 3–0 | Columbus | YouTube | 25–17 | 25–17 | 25–23 | | | 3,062 | Nationwide Arena |
| Wednesday, March 5 | 7:00 p.m. | San Diego | 0–3 | Grand Rapids | YouTube | 20–25 | 24–26 | 20–25 | | | 3,137 | Van Andel Arena |
| Wednesday, March 5 | 10:00 p.m. | Indy | 3–1 | Vegas | YouTube | 25–19 | 19–25 | 25–16 | 25–19 | | 1,510 | Lee's Family Forum |
| Friday, March 7 | 7:00 p.m. | Vegas | 2–3 | Atlanta | YouTube | 18–25 | 20–25 | 27–25 | 25–20 | 13–15 | 1,949 | Gas South Arena |
| Sunday, March 9 | 3:00 p.m. | Indy | 1–3 | Atlanta | YouTube | 23–25 | 26–28 | 25–22 | 31–33 | | 1,787 | Gas South Arena |
| Sunday, March 9 | 6:00 p.m. | Columbus | 1–3 | Orlando | CBSSN | 27–25 | 21–25 | 18–25 | 21–25 | | 1,855 | Addition Financial Arena |
| Sunday, March 9 | 7:05 p.m. | Grand Rapids | 3–1 | San Diego | YouTube | 25–17 | 28–30 | 25–15 | 25–18 | | 1,848 | Viejas Arena |
| Thursday, March 13 | 7:00 p.m. | San Diego | 3–2 | Orlando | YouTube | 17–25 | 25–16 | 25–15 | 15–25 | 17–15 | 1,613 | Addition Financial Arena |
| Thursday, March 13 | 7:00 p.m. | Omaha | 3–2 | Indy | YouTube | 21–25 | 18–25 | 25–20 | 25–23 | 15–13 | 3,777 | Fishers Event Center |
| Thursday, March 13 | 7:00 p.m. | Atlanta | 3–1 | Grand Rapids | YouTube | 25–23 | 25–27 | 25–16 | 25–22 | | 1,942 | Van Andel Arena |
| Friday, March 14 | 7:00 p.m. | Vegas | 0–3 | Columbus | YouTube | 22–25 | 21–25 | 23–25 | | | 3,600 | Nationwide Arena |
| Saturday, March 15 | 12:00 p.m. | Indy | 3–1 | Grand Rapids | YouTube | 22–25 | 25–20 | 25–19 | 25–22 | | 3,441 | Van Andel Arena |
| Saturday, March 15 | 7:00 p.m. | Omaha | 3–1 | Orlando | YouTube | 25–23 | 18–25 | 25–22 | 26–24 | | 1,780 | Addition Financial Arena |
| Saturday, March 15 | 7:00 p.m. | San Diego | 2–3 | Atlanta | YouTube | 25–15 | 25–23 | 19–25 | 23–25 | 14–16 | 1,667 | Gas South Arena |
| Wednesday, March 19 | 10:05 p.m. | Orlando | 3–1 | San Diego | YouTube | 25–23 | 25–23 | 23–25 | 25–12 | | 1,328 | Viejas Arena |
| Thursday, March 20 | 7:00 p.m. | Vegas | 3–1 | Grand Rapids | YouTube | 29–31 | 27–25 | 25–22 | 27–25 | | 2,993 | Van Andel Arena |
| Thursday, March 20 | 7:00 p.m. | Columbus | 2–3 | Indy | YouTube | 21–25 | 16–25 | 28–26 | 26–24 | 13–15 | 4,603 | Fishers Event Center |
| Friday, March 21 | 7:00 p.m. | Orlando | 1–3 | Atlanta | YouTube | 25-21 | 17–25 | 23–25 | 16–25 | | 2,101 | Gas South Arena |
| Saturday, March 22 | 7:00 p.m. | Indy | 3–0 | Omaha | FS1 | 25–23 | 25–23 | 25–21 | | | 12,929 | CHI Health Center |
| Sunday, March 23 | 1:00 p.m. | Atlanta | 3–0 | Columbus | CBSSN | 25–19 | 25–15 | 25–20 | | | 3,237 | Nationwide Arena |
| Friday, March 28 | 7:00 p.m. | Columbus | 2–3 | Grand Rapids | YouTube | 25–22 | 23–25 | 22–25 | 25–22 | 13–15 | 3,336 | Van Andel Arena |
| Friday, March 28 | 7:00 p.m. | San Diego | 1–3 | Atlanta | YouTube | 28–26 | 20–25 | 21–25 | 24–26 | | 5,539 | Georgia State Convocation Center |
| Friday, March 28 | 8:00 p.m. | Vegas | 0–3 | Omaha | YouTube | 23–25 | 14–25 | 19–25 | | | 10,017 | CHI Health Center |
| Sunday, March 30 | 3:00 p.m. | Indy | 3–2 | Orlando | YouTube | 25–21 | 20–25 | 21–25 | 25–15 | 15–11 | 2,365 | Addition Financial Arena |
| Sunday, March 30 | 3:00 p.m. | Columbus | 0–3 | Atlanta | YouTube | 18–25 | 17–25 | 18–25 | | | 2,562 | Georgia State Convocation Center |
| Sunday, March 30 | 4:00 p.m. | Grand Rapids | 1–3 | Omaha | YouTube | 20–25 | 25–17 | 19–25 | 22–25 | | 9,457 | CHI Health Center |
| Sunday, March 30 | 10:00 p.m. | San Diego | 3–1 | Vegas | FS2 | 26–24 | 24–26 | 25–17 | 25–17 | | 2,181 | Lee's Family Forum |

April

| Date | Time (ET) | Matchup | | | TV | Set 1 | Set 2 | Set 3 | Set 4 | Set 5 | Attendance | Location |
|---|---|---|---|---|---|---|---|---|---|---|---|---|
| Saturday, April 5 | 7:00 p.m. | Indy | 1–3 | Columbus | YouTube | 21–25 | 20–25 | 25–21 | 23–25 | | 3,852 | Nationwide Arena |
| Saturday, April 5 | 7:00 p.m. | Orlando | 1–3 | Omaha | YouTube | 25–14 | 17–25 | 23–25 | 15–25 | | 10,512 | CHI Health Center |
| Saturday, April 5 | 7:00 p.m. | Vegas | 0–3 | Grand Rapids | CBSSN | 17–25 | 16–25 | 17–25 | | | 5,247 | Van Andel Arena |
| Tuesday, April 8 | 10:05 p.m. | Atlanta | 3–2 | San Diego | YouTube | 21–25 | 25–17 | 25–13 | 15–25 | 15–12 | 894 | Viejas Arena |
| Thursday, April 10 | 7:00 p.m. | Grand Rapids | 1–3 | Orlando | YouTube | 18–25 | 25–18 | 18–25 | 15–25 | | 1,546 | Addition Financial Arena |
| Thursday, April 10 | 10:00 p.m. | Omaha | 3–1 | Vegas | YouTube | 25–17 | 25–20 | 22–25 | 26–24 | | 1,117 | Lee's Family Forum |
| Saturday, April 12 | 7:00 p.m. | Atlanta | 3–0 | Orlando | YouTube | 27–25 | 25–23 | 25–14 | | | 2,132 | Addition Financial Arena |
| Saturday, April 12 | 7:00 p.m. | Grand Rapids | 3–2 | Indy | YouTube | 25–17 | 22–25 | 21–25 | 25–18 | 15–11 | 4,914 | Fishers Event Center |
| Saturday, April 12 | 9:05 p.m. | Omaha | 1–3 | San Diego | YouTube | 19–25 | 25–23 | 25–27 | 13–25 | | 1,858 | Viejas Arena |
| Sunday, April 13 | 7:00 p.m. | Columbus | 3–0 | Vegas | FS2 | 25–20 | 25–23 | 25–21 | | | 1,363 | Lee's Family Forum |
| Wednesday, April 16 | 7:00 p.m. | San Diego | 1–3 | Columbus | YouTube | 22–25 | 20–25 | 25–22 | 19–25 | | 2,848 | Nationwide Arena |
| Thursday, April 17 | 7:00 p.m. | Vegas | 3–2 | Indy | YouTube | 16–25 | 27–25 | 25–16 | 29–31 | 15–12 | 3,381 | Fishers Event Center |
| Thursday, April 17 | 8:00 p.m. | Grand Rapids | 0–3 | Omaha | YouTube | 16–25 | 23–25 | 24–26 | | | 8,577 | CHI Health Center |
| Friday, April 18 | 7:00 p.m. | Orlando | 3–0 | Columbus | YouTube | 25–17 | 25–18 | 25–17 | | | 5,577 | Nationwide Arena |
| Saturday, April 19 | 12:00 p.m. | Indy | 1–3 | Grand Rapids | YouTube | 27–25 | 21–25 | 18–25 | 22–25 | | 3,872 | Van Andel Arena |
| Saturday, April 19 | 7:00 p.m. | Atlanta | 3–0 | Omaha | YouTube | 27–25 | 25–19 | 25–18 | | | 12,514 | CHI Health Center |
| Saturday, April 19 | 9:05 p.m. | Vegas | 2–3 | San Diego | YouTube | 23–25 | 18–25 | 25–21 | 25–19 | 10–15 | 1,745 | Viejas Arena |
| Friday, April 25 | TBA | Columbus | 2–3 | Omaha | YouTube | 25–21 | 20–25 | 24–26 | 25–23 | 9–15 | 9,517 | CHI Health Center |
| Friday, April 25 | 7:00 p.m. | Orlando | 3–1 | Indy | YouTube | 22–25 | 25–16 | 26–24 | 28–26 | | 4,429 | Fishers Event Center |
| Friday, April 25 | 10:00 p.m. | San Diego | 2–3 | Vegas | YouTube | 26–24 | 25–23 | 18–25 | 19–25 | 11–15 | 1,860 | Lee's Family Forum |
| Saturday, April 26 | 8:00 p.m. | Grand Rapids | 2–3 | Atlanta | FS2 | 23–25 | 22–25 | 25–21 | 25–23 | 13–15 | 2,037 | Gas South Arena |
| Sunday, April 27 | 3:00 p.m. | San Diego | 1–3 | Indy | YouTube | 22–25 | 19–25 | 25–20 | 23–25 | | 5,177 | Fishers Event Center |
| Sunday, April 27 | 4:00 p.m. | Vegas | 0–3 | Omaha | YouTube | 20–25 | 16–25 | 23–25 | | | 11,204 | CHI Health Center |
| Sunday, April 27 | 6:00 p.m. | Columbus | 1–3 | Orlando | CBSSN | 25–22 | 27–29 | 22–25 | 18–25 | | 2,644 | Addition Financial Arena |
| Wednesday, April 30 | 7:00 p.m. | Orlando | 3–2 | Grand Rapids | YouTube | 19–25 | 17–25 | 25–23 | 25–21 | 16–14 | 3,883 | Van Andel Arena |

May

| Date | Time (ET) | Matchup | | | TV | Set 1 | Set 2 | Set 3 | Set 4 | Set 5 | Attendance | Location |
|---|---|---|---|---|---|---|---|---|---|---|---|---|
| Thursday, May 1 | 7:00 p.m. | Atlanta | 3–2 | Indy | YouTube | 26–28 | 21–25 | 25–21 | 25–21 | 15–10 | 3,611 | Fishers Event Center |
| Thursday, May 1 | 10:05 p.m. | Columbus | 0–3 | San Diego | YouTube | 21–25 | 21–25 | 20–25 | | | 820 | Viejas Arena |
| Friday, May 2 | 7:00 p.m. | Omaha | 3–1 | Grand Rapids | FS2 | 19–25 | 25–17 | 25–20 | 25–21 | | 6,509 | Van Andel Arena |
| Friday, May 2 | 10:00 p.m. | Orlando | 3–1 | Vegas | YouTube | 25–22 | 21–25 | 25–19 | 25–19 | | 1,608 | Lee's Family Forum |
| Saturday, May 3 | 9:05 p.m. | Indy | 1–3 | San Diego | YouTube | 25–22 | 18–25 | 19–25 | 19–25 | | 2,996 | Viejas Arena |
| Sunday, May 4 | 6:00 p.m. | Omaha | 3–1 | Atlanta | YouTube | 25–23 | 25–22 | 19–25 | 25–23 | | 2,358 | Gas South Arena |
| Sunday, May 4 | 9:00 p.m. | Columbus | 3–2 | Vegas | CBSSN | 23–25 | 25–22 | 25–16 | 18–25 | 15–5 | 1,282 | Lee's Family Forum |

Note: All times Eastern

== Playoffs ==
Lee's Family Forum in Las Vegas hosted the league's second playoffs.

Semifinals
1 | Omaha Supernovas | 2
4 | Indy Ignite | 3
2 | Atlanta Vibe | 1
3 | Orlando Valkyries | 3

Finals
4 | Indy Ignite | 1
3 | Orlando Valkyries | 3

=== Semifinals ===
| | Score | | Set 1 | Set 2 | Set 3 | Set 4 | Set 5 |
|---|---|---|---|---|---|---|---|
| (1) Omaha Supernovas | 2–3 | (4) Indy Ignite | 17–25 | 25–23 | 25–23 | 20–25 | 13–15 |
| (2) Atlanta Vibe | 1–3 | (3) Orlando Valkyries | 18–25 | 23–25 | 25–18 | 16–25 | X |

=== Final ===
| | Score | | Set 1 | Set 2 | Set 3 | Set 4 | Set 5 |
|---|---|---|---|---|---|---|---|
| (3) Orlando Valkyries | 3–1 | (4) Indy Ignite | 25–21 | 25–19 | 19–25 | 25–15 | X |

Note: All times Eastern

== Awards ==
=== Player of the Week Award ===
| Date Awarded | Player | Team | Ref |
|---|---|---|---|
| January 14 | Leketor Member-Meneh | Indy Ignite | |
| January 21 | Alisha Glass Childress | Vegas Thrill | |
| January 28 | Carli Snyder | Grand Rapids Rise | |
| February 4 | Erika Pritchard | Grand Rapids Rise | |
| February 12 | Natalie Foster | Orlando Valkyries | |
| February 18 | Leah Edmond | Atlanta Vibe | |
| February 25 | Izabella Rapacz | Columbus Fury | |
| March 4 | Brittany Abercrombie | Orlando Valkyries | |
| March 11 | Emily Londot | Omaha Supernovas | |
