= Indy Ignite =

Professional women's indoor volleyball team based in Indiana, US

- Sport: Volleyball
- Founded: 2023
- First season: 2025
- League: Major League Volleyball
- Location: Fishers, Indiana
- Arena: Fishers Event Center
- Colors: Navy, light blue, orange, yellow, white
- Owner: Jim Schumacher and Don Hutchinson
- President: Mary Kay “MK” Huse
- Head coach: Lauren Bertolacci
- Championships: 0
- Playoff berths: 2 (2025, 2026)
- Website: provolleyball.com/teams/indy-ignite

The Indy Ignite are a women's professional indoor volleyball team based in the Indianapolis metropolitan area that competes in Major League Volleyball (MLV). The team plays its home games at Fishers Event Center. The Ignite began play as an expansion team in the 2025 season.

== History ==
=== Founding ===
On December 7, 2023, the Pro Volleyball Federation announced that an expansion team was coming to Indianapolis, Indiana. On January 28, 2024, the ownership group of Indy Pro Volleyball publicly released the name and logo for Indiana's first professional volleyball team. The team was to play in the Fishers Event Center, a 7,000-seat entertainment and sporting venue in Fishers, Indiana, where the Ignite would split time with the Indy Fuel and Fishers Freight. The Ignite debuted a navy blue, light blue, orange, yellow and white colorway with their mascot Pepper.

=== 2025 season ===
The Ignite earned the 1st overall pick in the 2025 PVF draft held on November 25, 2024, before the 2025 PVF season. On draft night, the Ignite traded the 1st overall pick (Merritt Beason) to the Atlanta Vibe in exchange for the 2nd and 9th overall picks where the franchise selected Anna DeBeer and Elena Scott respectively. On January 14, 2025, Leketor Member-Meneh earned PVF Player of the Week Award. On May 7, Sydney Hilley was named PVF Setter of the Year while both Hilley and Azhani Tealer were named PVF All-League First Team. The franchise qualified for the 2025 PVF Playoffs as the 4th seed with a 13–15 record, hosted at Lee's Family Forum in Las Vegas. In the franchise's first playoff debut, the Ignite upset the 1st seed Omaha Supernovas 3–2 in the semifinals, before advancing to the 2025 PVF finals against the Orlando Valkyries. George Padjen served as the head coach for the inaugural season before his resignation at the end of the season.

=== 2026 season ===
On July 2, 2025, the team announced that Lauren Bertolacci would be the head coach for the upcoming season. In August 2025, the PVF and MLV struck a deal to both merge and expand, starting in the 2026 MVL season.

== Seasons ==
Indy Ignite season overviews
Season	League	Finish	Wins	Losses	Pct.	Playoffs	Head coach
Indy Ignite
2025	PVF	4th	13	15	.464	Won semifinals (Omaha Supernovas) (3–2); Lost finals (Orlando Valkyries) (1–3)	George Padjen
2026	MLV	1st	23	5	.821	TBD semifinals (Omaha Supernovas) (0–0)	Lauren Bertolacci
Regular season			36	20	.643	2025–present	
Playoffs			1	1	.500	2025–present	

== 2025 roster ==
Current as of February 2, 2026.

Number	Player	Position	College/club	Height
2	(United States) Emma Halter	Libero	Texas	5'5"
4	(Canada) Emoni Bush	Outside hitter	Washington/Oklahoma	6'3"
7	(United States) Leketor Member-Meneh	Outside hitter	Missouri/Pittsburgh	5'8"
8	(United States) Camryn Hannah	Opposite hitter	Clemson/Penn State	6'2"
9	(United States) Elena Scott	Libero	Louisville	5'9"
11	(United States) Ainise Havili	Setter	Kansas	5'10"
12	(United States) Taylor Landfair	Outside hitter	Minnesota/Nebraska	6'5"
13	(United States) Cara Cresse	Middle blocker	Louisville	6'6"
14	(United States) Anna DeBeer	Outside hitter	Louisville	5'11"
17	(United States) Blake Mohler	Middle blocker	Purdue	6'1"
19	(United States) Azhani Tealer	Opposite Hitter	Kentucky	5'9"
22	(United States) Lydia Martyn	Middle blocker	Liberty/Oklahoma	6'3"
23	(United States) Kayla Lund	Outside hitter	Pittsburgh	6'0"
28	(Italy) Alexandra Botezat	Middle blocker		6'6"
91	(United States) Mia Tuaniga	Setter	USC	5'9"
