= Valeria Vázquez Gomez =

Puerto Rican volleyball player

Personal information
- Nationality: Puerto Rico
- Born: January 28, 2001 (age 25)
- Home town: Manatí, Puerto Rico
- Education: Pittsburgh (2019–2024)
- Height: 6 ft 1 in (186 cm)

Volleyball information
- Position: Outside hitter
- Current club: (Italy) Numia Vero Volley Milano

Career
- Years: Team
- 2025: (United States) Omaha Supernovas
- 2025–2026: (Italy) Casalmaggiore
- 2026–: (Italy) Numia Vero Volley Milano

National team
- Years: Team
- 2022–: Puerto Rico

Valeria Vázquez Gomez (born January 28, 2001) is a Puerto Rican professional volleyball player who plays as an outside hitter for Numia Vero Volley Milano in the Italian Serie A1. She played college volleyball for the Pittsburgh Panthers before beginning her professional career with the Omaha Supernovas in the Pro Volleyball Federation, then moving to Italy, first with Volleyball Casalmaggiore and now with Milano.

== Early life ==
Vázquez Gomez was born in Manatí, Puerto Rico, the daughter of Ramón Vázquez Meléndez, a former professional basketball player. She has four siblings.

== Collegiate career ==
Vázquez Gomez played six seasons for the Pittsburgh Panthers from 2019 to 2024, wearing jersey number 2 as an outside hitter. Over her college career she helped lead Pitt to four consecutive NCAA National Semifinal appearances from 2021 to 2024. She earned AVCA Second Team All-American honors in 2022 and was a three-time All-ACC selection, being named to the All-ACC First Team in 2022 and the All-ACC Second Team in 2023 and 2024. She finished her Pitt career with 1,311 points, 1,097 kills, 1,031 digs, 154 blocks, and 131 aces.

== Professional career ==
Vázquez Gomez was selected by the Omaha Supernovas in the fourth round (30th overall) of the 2024 Pro Volleyball Federation Draft and signed her first professional contract with the club on December 27, 2024. She played the 2025 PVF season with Omaha before signing with Italian club Volleyball Casalmaggiore of Serie A2 for the 2025–26 season, finishing as the team's second-leading scorer with 258 points. In July 2026, she signed with Numia Vero Volley Milano for the 2026–27 season, moving up to Serie A1 for the first time in her career and gaining eligibility for the CEV Champions League.

== International career ==
Vázquez Gomez was part of the Puerto Rico roster at the 2025 FIVB Volleyball Women's World Championship.
