= Robert Douglas (American football) =

American football player (born 1982)

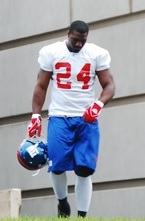
- Douglas at 2007 New York Giants training camp

No. 24
- Position: Fullback

Personal information
- Born: July 25, 1982 (age 44); St. Louis, Missouri, U.S.
- Listed height: 6 ft 1 in (1.85 m)
- Listed weight: 230 lb (104 kg)

Career information
- High school: St. Louis (MO) Lutheran North
- College: Memphis
- NFL draft: 2005: undrafted

Career history
- Tennessee Titans (2005)*; Houston Texans (2005)*; Tampa Bay Buccaneers (2006)*; Houston Texans (2006)*; New York Giants (2006); Kansas City Brigade (2007)*; New York Giants (2007)
- * Offseason or practice squad member only

Awards and highlights
- Super Bowl champion (XLII)
- Stats at Pro Football Reference

Robert Edward Douglas II (born July 25, 1982) is an American former professional football fullback who played for the New York Giants in the National Football League (NFL). He played college football at the University of Memphis.

== Professional career ==
Douglas was not selected in the 2005 NFL draft. The Tennessee Titans signed him as a free agent on April 27, 2005, and to the practice squad on September 4, 2005. Douglas missed training camp due to an injury. The Titans waived Douglas on November 1, 2005. On December 20, 2005, Douglas signed with the Houston Texans practice squad.

On January 12, 2006, the Tampa Bay Buccaneers signed Douglas to a future/reserve contract. The team waived Douglas on July 24, 2006, to make room on the roster to sign quarterback Bruce Gradkowski. The New York Giants signed Douglas on August 15, 2006, then waived him on August 28. Douglas then signed with the Houston Texans and was on the practice squad until being waived on September 12, 2006. Douglas then signed with AFL team Kansas City Brigade on November 28, 2006, and was waived on March 14, 2007, before the season. While signed with the Brigade, Douglas entered "other league exempt" status, after the New York Giants signed Douglas to the practice squad on December 26, 2006.

At training camp, Douglas was the only fullback on the roster. Douglas played in only one NFL regular season game in his career, on September 23, 2007. He sat out the rest of the season due to a knee injury. The Giants won Super Bowl XLII after the season.He also have two kids Named Ryan Douglas and Robert Douglas

The Giants waived Douglas on August 30, 2008.
