= Lutheran High School North (Missouri) =

Private school in St. Louis County, Missouri

Lutheran Middle and High School North

Location
- 5401 Lucas and Hunt Road; St. Louis, Missouri 63121; United States; 38°43′03″N 90°17′02″W

Information
- Type: Private
- Motto: Achieve, Believe, Belong!
- Religious affiliation: Lutheran Church – Missouri Synod
- Established: 1964; 62 years ago
- Sister school: Lutheran High School South
- Principal: Jason Becker
- Head of school: Timothy Brackman
- Grades: 6–12
- Schedule type: Block scheduling
- Colors: Maroon and gold
- Athletics conference: Metro League
- Nickname: Crusaders
- Accreditation: AdvancEd
- Website: lncrusaders.org

Lutheran Middle and High School North (LN), commonly known as Lutheran North, is a parochial Christian high school in St. Louis County, Missouri, United States. It currently offers education in grades six through twelve, and is associated with the Lutheran Church – Missouri Synod. Along with Lutheran High School South, the school belongs to the Lutheran High School Association of St. Louis.

Lutheran North is accredited by AdvancED and National Lutheran Schools, and is a charter member of the National Alliance of High Schools. Its governing body is a 15-member board of trustees appointed by the 63 member congregations of the high school association. The school is currently administrated by Head of School Timothy Brackman, and Principal Jason Becker.

== Academics ==
In the 1994–95 school year, Lutheran North became one of the first high schools in the St. Louis area to move from a traditional seven-period schedule to the block schedule.

The school has long been noted for its emphasis on the integration of technology in the classroom. Beginning in the 2012–13 school year, Lutheran North and Lutheran High School South started a "one to one" technology initiative. This was intended to help students integrate technology into all aspects of their education, most notably through the distribution of iPads to every student and faculty member. Starting in the 2019–20 school year, the iPads were replaced by Chromebooks.

Over 85% of the teachers at Lutheran North hold a master's degree. Over 96% of the students who graduate from LHSN attend a four-year university, and about 95% of the student body participates in at least one co-curricular activity.

== Athletics ==
Lutheran North's athletics program includes 30 teams in 13 sports. They have won more than 120 individual and team MSHSAA district championships, and 15 teams have won state championships. Lutheran North's most recent state championship was the 2024 Class Four 11-Man Football State Championship. In 2004, the athletics department received a $1 million donation by alumnus Jim Crane to improve the athletic facilities and enlarge the campus.

== Student life ==
=== Worship services ===
Chapel is held every day of the week except Wednesday in the school gymnasium. Administrated by the dean of Chapel, chapel services are typically traditional and usually follow the order of the historical Lutheran liturgy. Monday morning chapel services consist of the reading of scripture passages appointed for the week and the singing of hymns. Services on Tuesday, Thursday, and Friday typically include a brief sermon or message, and the order of Confession and Absolution is typically administered at least once per week.

A small group of students is assigned the task of setting up the movable altar and pulpit, along with appropriate banners and paraments for the current season of the Church year every day before chapel.

Small Group is held every Wednesday morning in place of chapel. Students meet in groups of 15 to 20 students in their assigned classrooms for a time of prayer and devotion. Each small group is peer led by at least two "Peer Ministers", and is supervised by two faculty advisers. Each small group collects an offering and decides on a charitable organization for which they want to raise funds.

=== Peer Ministry ===
Peer Ministers are students (grades 10–12) who have applied to serve as small group leaders at Lutheran High School North. Held to high standards personally, behaviorally, and academically, they are not only responsible for setting good examples for other students, but are also in charge of leading small group devotions. Peer Ministers are required to attend a training session before each school year. Middle school students also participate in multi-grade small groups within the middle school program. They refer to these small groups as "houses".

== Notable alumni ==
- Steve Atwater (1984), American football player
- Jim Crane (1972), businessman
- Robert Douglas (2000), former NFL player
- Bobby Joe Edmonds (1982), former NFL player
- John Hayden Jr. (1981), St. Louis Police Commissioner
- Kurt Petersen (1975), former NFL player
- Kimora Lee Simmons (1993), model
- Connie Teaberry-Lindsey (1988), track and field athlete
- Renell Wren (2014), American football player
