= Omaha Supernovas =

American volleyball team

- Sport: Volleyball
- Founded: 2023
- League: Major League Volleyball
- Based in: Omaha, Nebraska
- Arena: CHI Health Center Omaha
- Colors: Pink, light blue, purple, navy blue
- Owner: Nebraska Pro Volleyball (Danny White & Jason Derulo)
- President: Diane Mendenhall
- Head coach: Thomas Robson (interim)
- General manager: John Cook
- Overall record: (Through 6/16/2025) Overall: 39-16 Home 19-7 Away 18-8 Postseason 2-1
- Championships: 1 (2024)
- Playoff berths: 3 (2024, 2025, 2026)
- Website: supernovas.com

The Omaha Supernovas are a women's professional indoor volleyball team based in Omaha, Nebraska, that competes in Major League Volleyball (MLV). The team plays its home games at CHI Health Center Omaha. The Supernovas began play as one of the charter franchises of the league, and was its inaugural champion in the 2024 season.

== History ==
On April 12, 2023, Omaha was announced as one of the cities to get a Pro Volleyball Federation franchise for the league's inaugural season, led by an ownership group headed by Omaha businessman Danny White and R&B/pop singer Jason Derulo. The Supernovas name, logo and colors were announced on July 20.

The first match, of both the Supernovas’ season and the inaugural Pro Volleyball Federation, was played on January 24, 2024, at home, with the Supernovas losing to the Atlanta Vibe in five sets. The attendance mark of 11,624 set a record for both a women's professional volleyball match in the United States, and in the Pro Volleyball Federation. The previous attendance record for a women's professional volleyball match in the United States was 10,213 fans, at an Olympic qualifier on January 9, 2016.

== Challenges ==
The Supernovas have faced an unusual amount of coaching turnover for a successful franchise. In early 2026, head coach Luka Slabe was abruptly fired with just six matches left in the regular season. This echoed the franchise's inaugural season, when their first head coach, Shelton Collier, was fired after only two games.

Despite fighting through the 2026 postseason underdogs and upsetting the top-seeded Indy Ignite, the Supernovas fell just short in a five-set MLV Championship loss to the Dallas Pulse. During the championship match, Omaha's serve-receive passing broke down, creating predictable "two-ball" options that allowed Dallas to easily block their outside hitters. Dallas also dominated Omaha at the net with highly effective middle attacks and tip kills.

As MLV expands to 12 teams, Omaha faces the highly competitive Western Conference alongside rivals like Dallas and Los Angeles.

== Roster ==
Current as of February 2, 2026.

Number	Player	Position	College	Height
2	(United States) Sydney Hilley	Setter	Wisconsin	6'0"
5	(United States) Brooke Nuneviller	Outside hitter	Oregon	5'10"
6	(United States) Brooke Mosher	Setter	Illinois/Pittsburgh	6'0"
7	(United States) Norah Sis TeBrake	Outside hitter	Creighton	6'1"
8	(United States) Reagan Cooper	Outside hitter	Texas Tech/Kansas	6'2"
9	(United States) Morgan Hentz	Libero	Stanford	5'9"
10	(United States) Kiara Reinhardt	Middle blocker	Creighton	6'3"
11	(United States) Sarah Parsons	Outside hitter	Minnesota	6'2"
13	(United States) Merritt Beason	Opposite hitter	Florida/Nebraska	6'4"
17	(United States) Janice Leao	Middle blocker	Miami (FL)	6'3"
20	(United States) Allison Holder	Libero	Morehead State/Creighton	5'7"
21	(United States) Toyosi Onabanjo	Middle blocker	Iowa/Kansas	6'1"
23	(United States) Elise Goetzinger	Middle blocker	Kentucky/Creighton	6'4"
26	(United States) Leyla Blackwell	Middle blocker	San Diego/Nebraska	6'4"
27	(United States) Emily Londot	Opposite hitter	Ohio State	6'3"

== 2024 season ==
Before the season began, the Omaha Supernovas announced that head coach Shelton Collier would serve as an advisor to the organization. Assistant coach Laura “Bird” Kuhn was named as the interim head coach, with Jazz Schmidt joining the staff as an assistant coach and operations assistant.

The team broke the record for the highest attendance at a women's professional volleyball match in the United States three different times throughout the season. The current attendance record was set on Saturday, March 16, 2024, when 12,090 spectators watched the Supernovas beat the Valkyries at the CHI Health Center. The team posted the highest attendance in the PVF, with an average home attendance of 9,656, and a total attendance of 134,969 over the entire season.

In the playoffs, the Supernovas beat San Diego and Grand Rapids to become the inaugural champions of the PVF.

Home Attendance Records
DATE	OPPONENT	FANS
Wednesday, Jan. 24	Atlanta	11,624
Saturday, Feb. 3	San Diego	11,403
Wednesday, Feb. 7	Vegas	9,076
Sunday, Feb. 18	Orlando	11,918
Thursday, March 14	Atlanta	8,114
Saturday, March 16	Orlando	12,090
Thursday, March 28	Grand Rapids	7,505
Saturday, March 30	Vegas	10,315
Thursday, April 4	Columbus	7,411
Saturday, April 20	San Diego	11,303
Friday, April 26	Grand Rapids	7,107
Thursday, May 9	Columbus	8,009
TOTAL	12 Matches	115,875
	Average	9,656
PVF Semifinals	San Diego	8,416
PVF Championship	Grand Rapids	10,678
TOTAL	15 Matches	134,969

== 2025 season ==
The Omaha Supernovas, Nebraska's professional volleyball team and first Pro Volleyball Champions, continued to be a trailblazer during the 2025 season, finishing No. 1 in the world in pro volleyball attendance for the second straight year.

Over the course of 14 regular-season home matches at the CHI Health Center, the Supernovas reached a total attendance of 152,949 to mark a staggering 32% increase from the team's inaugural 2024 season. Omaha also averaged a world-leading 10,925 spectators per match, surpassing last season's 9,656 average for a 13% year-over-year increase.

The second-year franchise broke its own U.S. pro volleyball attendance record (12,090) five times in 2025, including a new benchmark of 13,486 set during the season opener against the Atlanta Vibe on January 10. The Supernovas drew more than 10,000 at nine matches this season, including five attendance marks that topped 12,000.

Omaha dominates the U.S. pro volleyball attendance chart, now holding 19 of the top 20. The top five most attended matches in U.S. history were set by the Supernovas in 2025 including six of the top eight overall. Plus, twelve of Omaha's 2025 home matches rank in the top 20. In just two seasons and 28 match days, the Supernovas have totaled an impressive 287,918 in attendance.

A pillar in women's sports, the Supernovas’ average attendance ranks among global leaders by surpassing league averages from the WNBA (9,807), PWHL (7,260), and WSL (6,713), while sitting just behind the NWSL (11,250), which is entering its 13th season.

The support from NovasNation fueled the toughest home environment in professional volleyball, as Omaha tied for the PVF lead with a 10–4 home record. Despite returning only two players from last season's championship-winning campaign and introducing eight rookies, the Supernovas posted league records for most wins and most sweeps (10) en route to claiming the regular season title with a 21–7 record.

Franchise leader Brooke Nuneviller elevated her game in 2025, earning Outside Hitter of the Year honors and her second straight All-League First Team selection after averaging 3.77 kills (4th in PVF) and 3.45 digs per set (5th). Veteran setter Natalia Valentín-Anderson was named to the All-League Second Team, ranking fourth in assists per set (9.57) and leading all setters with 3.11 digs per set.

Date	Opponent	Attendance
Friday, Jan. 10	Atlanta Vibe	13,486
Sunday, Jan. 19	San Diego Mojo	12,723
Friday, Jan. 31	Columbus Fury	11,712
Sunday, Feb. 16	San Diego Mojo	12,768
Thursday, Feb. 27	Orlando Valkyries	8,010
Sunday, March 2	Indy Ignite	9,523
Saturday, March 22	Indy Ignite	12,929
Friday, March 28	Vegas Thrill	10,017
Sunday, March 30	Grand Rapids Rise	9,457
Saturday, April 5	Orlando Valkyries	10,512
Thursday, April 17	Grand Rapids Rise	8,577
Saturday, April 19	Atlanta Vibe	12,514
Friday, April 25	Columbus Fury	9,517
Sunday, April 27	Vegas Thrill	11,204

Date	Team	Home/ Away	Location	Time/ Results
1/10/25	Atlanta Vibe	Home	CHI Health Center	Won in 5 sets
1/12/25	Grand Rapids Rise	Away	Van Andel Arena	Won in 3 sets
1/17/25	Vegas Thrill	Away	Lee's Family Forum	Lost in 5 sets
1/19/25	San Diego Mojo	Home	CHI Health Center	Lost in 4 sets
1/24/25	Columbus Fury	Away	Nationwide Arena	Won in 3 sets
1/31/25	Columbus Fury	Home	CHI Health Center	Won in 3 sets
2/2/25	Orlando Valkyries	Away	Addition Financial Arena	Lost in 3 sets
2/6/25	Indy Ignite	Away	Fishers Event Center	Won in 3 sets
2/8/25	Atlanta Vibe	Away	Gas South Arena	Won in 4 sets
2/16/25	San Diego Mojo	Home	CHI Health Center	Won in 3 sets
2/20/25	San Diego Mojo	Away	Viejas Arena	Won in 4 sets
2/27/25	Orlando Valkyries	Home	CHI Health Center	Lost in 3 sets
3/2/25	Indy Ignite	Home	CHI Health Center	Won in 3 sets
3/5/25	Columbus Fury	Away	Nationwide Arena	Won in 3 sets
3/13/25	Indy Ignite	Away	Fishers Event Center	Won in 5 sets
3/15/25	Orlando Valkyries	Away	Addition Financial Arena	Won in 4 sets
3/22/25	Indy Ignite	Home	CHI Health Center	Lost in 3 sets
3/28/25	Vegas Thrill	Home	CHI Health Center	Won in 3 sets
3/30/25	Grand Rapids Rise	Home	CHI Health Center	Won in 4 sets
4/5/25	Orlando Valkyries	Home	CHI Health Center	Won in 4 sets
4/10/25	Vegas Thrill	Away	Lee's Family Forum	Won in 4 sets
4/12/25	San Diego Mojo	Away	Viejas Arena	Lost in 4 sets
4/17/25	Grand Rapids Rise	Home	CHI Health Center	Won in 3 sets
4/19/25	Atlanta Vibe	Home	CHI Health Center	Lost in 3 sets
4/25/25	Columbus Fury	Home	CHI Health Center	Won in 5 sets
4/27/25	Vegas Thrill	Home	CHI Health Center	Won in 3 sets
5/2/25	Grand Rapids Rise	Away	Van Andel Arena	Won in 4 sets
5/4/25	Atlanta Vibe	Away	Gas South Arena	Won in 4 sets

== 2025 roster ==
Current as of March 15, 2025.

Number	Player	Position	Height	College/Club
1	(Puerto Rico) Natalia Valentín-Anderson	Setter	5'10"	Florida International
4	(Puerto Rico) Valeria Vázquez Gomez	Outside hitter	6'1"	Pittsburgh
5	(United States) Brooke Nuneviller	Outside hitter	5'10"	Oregon
6	(United States) Kendra Wait	Setter	5'10"	Creighton
8	(United States) Reagan Cooper	Outside hitter	6'2"	Texas Tech, Kansas
9	(United States) Mac Podraza	Setter	6'2"	Ohio State, Penn State
10	(Colombia) Camila Gómez	Libero	5'2"	Miami Dade, Texas A&M
11	(United States) Kelsie Payne	Opposite Hitter	6'3"	Kansas
14	(United States) Ally Batenhorst	Outside hitter	6'5"	Nebraska, USC
17	(United States) Phoebe Awoleye	Middle blocker	6'2"	Georgia, LMU, Minnesota
20	(United States) Allison Whitten	Libero	5'2"	Morehead State, Creighton
21	(United States) Toyosi Onabanjo	Middle blocker	6'1"	Iowa, Kansas
22	(United States) Lindsay Krause	Outside hitter	6'4"	Nebraska
23	(United States) Kaitlyn Hord	Middle Blocker	6'4"	Penn State, Nebraska
27	(United States) Emily Londot	Opposite hitter	6'3"	Ohio State
28	(United States) Kayla Caffey	Middle Blocker	6'0"	Missouri, Nebraska, Texas

=== 2024-2025 Coaching staff ===
Name	Role	Tenure	Record
Laura 'Bird' Kuhn	Head Coach	2024-2025	
Thomas Robson	Assistant Coach		

=== 2026 Coaching staff ===
Name	Role	Tenure	Record
Luka Slabe	Head Coach	2026	11-11
Thomas Robson	Assistant Coach	2024-2026	
Thomas Robson	Interim head coach	2026	
