= Susan Woodstra =

American volleyball player (born 1957)

Sue Woodstra

Personal information
- Born: Susan Jean Woodstra; May 21, 1957 (age 69); Colton, California, U.S.
- Height: 5 ft 9 in (175 cm)
- Education: University of Southern California

Coaching information
Previous teams coached
Years	Teams
1985–1988; 1989–1992; 1993; 1994; 1995–1998; 1999–2001; 2002–2006; 2007; 2008; 2008–2012	Arizona State (assistant); Pittsburgh; USC München; Notre Dame (volunteer assistant); California; Florida State (assistant); Humboldt State; U.S. women's national team U.S. women's national team (assistant); Humboldt State

Volleyball information
- Position: Outside hitter
- Number: 2 (national team); 4 (USC)
Medal record
Women's volleyball
Representing the United States
Olympic Games
Silver medal – second place	1984 Los Angeles	Team
World Championship
Bronze medal – third place	1982 Peru
Pan American Games
Silver medal – second place	1983 Caracas	Team

Susan Jean Woodstra (born May 21, 1957) is an American retired volleyball coach and player. As a player, she won a silver medal with the United States women's national volleyball team at the 1984 Summer Olympics in Los Angeles.

== Playing days ==
At the collegiate level, Woodstra earned All-American honors at USC. She then played eight years on the national team, serving as captain for four years, including for the 1984 Olympic silver medal team. Woodstra also played professional volleyball from 1984 to 1988 for the NEC Red Rockets of the Japan V.League. She also played three seasons with the Merrill Lynch/Reebok USVBA team, where she earned MVP honors.

Her number 4 hangs on a banner in the volleyball court in USC's Galen Center, along with Tim Hovland's number 10.

== Coaching ==
Woodstra entered coaching as an assistant at Arizona State in 1995 until she was hired as the head coach of the University of Pittsburgh Panthers women's volleyball team in 1989 where she served as head coach until 1992. During her tenure, she led her teams to Big East Conference Tournament Championships in each season as well as three Big East regular season championships, winning the regular season each year from when the Big East instituted round-robin play in 1990. She also led the Panthers to four post-season appearances including one Women's Invitation Volleyball Championship appearance in 1989 in which Pitt finished third, and three NCAA volleyball tournaments, including in 1990 where Pitt reached the regional semifinal and finished ranked 18th in the final American Volleyball Coaches Association (AVCA) Coaches poll. Woodstra earned Big East Coach of the Year honors in 1990. Her NCAA tournament teams were led by standout second team All-American outside hitter Ann Marie Lucanie, who won multiple Big East Tournament MVP awards and Big East Player of the Year awards. In total, Woodstra compiled an overall record of 110–39 (.738) over four seasons as head coach.

After her tenure at Pitt, Woodstra became the head coach of the SC Münster women's profession volleyball team in Münster, Germany, and led the team to a CEV Cup championship in 1992. She then served as a volunteer assistant coach at Notre Dame for one season before taking over as the head coach of University of California, Berkeley Golden Bears volleyball team from 1995 to 1998. In 1999, Woodstra was hired as an assistant coach at Florida State before serving as the head coach of Humboldt State University Lumberjacks from 2002 to 2012.

Woodstra took a leave of absence from coaching at Humboldt State in 2007 and the beginning of 2008 in order to serve as the head coach of U.S. women's national volleyball team in 2007 and an assistant coach during the 2008 Olympics. In 2007, she led the team to a bronze medal at the Pan American games. Woostra served as the first assistant coach for the silver-medal winning U.S. Olympic women's team in 2008. She retired from coaching at Humboldt State in 2012.

Woodstra was inducted into the American Volleyball Coaches Association Hall of Fame in 2006.
