= Bobby Joe Edmonds =

American football player (born 1964)

No. 30, 41
- Position: Running back

Personal information
- Born: September 26, 1964 (age 62); Nashville, Tennessee, U.S.
- Listed height: 5 ft 11 in (1.80 m)
- Listed weight: 186 lb (84 kg)

Career information
- High school: Lutheran North (St. Louis)
- College: Arkansas
- NFL draft: 1986: 5th round, 126th overall pick

Career history
- Seattle Seahawks (1986–1988); Detroit Lions (1989)*; Los Angeles Raiders (1989); Seattle Seahawks (1990)*; Tampa Bay Buccaneers (1995)
- * Offseason or practice squad member only

Awards and highlights
- First-team All-Pro (1986); Pro Bowl (1986)

Career NFL statistics
- Punt return yards: 1,471
- Kick return yards: 3,646
- Total touchdowns: 1
- Stats at Pro Football Reference

Bobby Joe Edmonds Jr. (born September 26, 1964) is an American former professional football player who was a running back in the National Football League (NFL) for the Seattle Seahawks, Los Angeles Raiders, and Tampa Bay Buccaneers from 1986 to 1989 and 1995. Edmonds played college football for the Arkansas Razorbacks and was selected by Seattle in the fifth round of the 1986 NFL draft. Edmonds still holds two Seahawks records, most punt return yards gained in a career (1,010 yards) and most punt return yards gained in a season (419 yards). He also made the AFC Pro Bowl squad in 1986 as a rookie.

A 1982 graduate of Lutheran High School North, in St. Louis, Missouri, Edmonds had a successful college career in football as a running back at the University of Arkansas where he returned after his football career to complete a bachelor's degree in broadcasting. After working as an occasional sports writer and color commentator, Edmonds has opened a gallery for fine art.

Edmonds at one time hosted his own show "The Lunch Special" on the Hog Sports Radio Network in Northwest Arkansas. He has two sons.
