= Lutheran High School South =

Private high school in Affton, Missouri, United States

Location
- 9515 Tesson Ferry Road; St. Louis, Missouri; United States; 38.5484°N 90.3355°W

Information
- Type: Private
- Religious affiliation: Lutheranism
- Denomination: Lutheran Church – Missouri Synod
- Established: 1957; 69 years ago
- Sister school: Lutheran High School North
- Head of School: Jonathan Butterfield
- Grades: 9–12
- Enrollment: 600
- Colors: Black and gold
- Athletics conference: Metro League
- Team name: Lancers
- Accreditation: AdvancED
- Website: www.lslancers.org

Lutheran High School South (LHSS), commonly known as Lutheran South, is a private Lutheran co-educational school located in Affton, an unincorporated area in St. Louis County, Missouri, in the United States. Established in 1957, the school is affiliated with the Lutheran Church – Missouri Synod.

The school serves over 500 students in grades 9 through 12. Together with Lutheran High School North, it is operated by the Lutheran High School Association of St. Louis.

== Overview ==
Students at Lutheran South can earn college credit through courses offering either dual credit through Saint Louis University or the opportunity to take Advanced Placement exams. Lutheran South's college preparatory curriculum results in 97% of graduates attending colleges and/or universities. In addition to a wide variety of elective courses, students take theology classes each year. Daily worship experiences and service opportunities are also part of the Lutheran South experience.

In the 2022–23 school year, Lutheran South had 520 students served by over 50 professional staff, including teachers, counselors and administrators. Over 80% of the faculty hold a master's degree or higher. LHSS has a diverse co-curricular program, including 39 athletic, cheerleading and dance squads; intramural activities; drama presentations; the Messengers, a worship-through-drama group; an mock trial team; academic games team; and a student council. Lutheran South is particularly known for its music program. Two choral music groups, Concert Choir and Lancer Singers. Lancer Singers is audition-based. The three instrumental groups are Concert Band, Wind Symphony and the Jazz Band. The latter two are audition-based. Lutheran South's music department utilizes the talents of nearly one-third of the student body.

== Notable alumni ==
- Jim Mayer (1979), singer-songwriter, longtime bass guitarist for Jimmy Buffett’s Coral Reefer Band
- Peter Mayer (1976), longtime lead guitarist for Jimmy Buffett’s Coral Reefer Band
- Leketor Member-Meneh (2017), volleyball player
- Ian Quinn (2012), Olympic speed skater
- Cody Schrader (2018), University of Missouri running back
