= Merritt Beason =

American volleyball player

Personal information
- Full name: Merritt Elise Beason
- Nationality: United States
- Born: April 16, 2003 (age 23); Gardendale, Alabama, U.S.
- Hometown: Gardendale, Alabama
- Height: 6 ft 4 in (1.93 m)
- Education: Florida (2021-22); Nebraska (2023-24)

Volleyball information
- Position: Opposite hitter
- Current club: (United States) Omaha Supernovas
- Number: 13

Career
Years	Teams
2025	(United States) Atlanta Vibe
2026–	(United States) Omaha Supernovas

Merritt Elise Beason (born April 16, 2003) is an American professional volleyball player who plays as an opposite hitter for the Omaha Supernovas. Beason was the number one draft pick for the Pro Volleyball Federation in 2024. She played college volleyball for the Florida Gators and the Nebraska Cornhuskers.

== Early life ==
Merritt Beason was born and raised in Gardendale, Alabama. While playing volleyball for Gardendale High School, she was a first-team all-state selection, was named a 2020 AVCA Under Armour Third-Team All-American and was a two-time AAU Academic All-American.

== College career ==
Beason started her college volleyball career at the University of Florida, where she was an All-SEC and AVCA All-Southeast Region honoree in 2022, as well as an All-SEC Freshman Team selection in 2021.

She transferred to Nebraska following two years at Florida. Her first season as a Husker, she averaged 3.76 kills per set and a .282 hitting percentage and earned All-Big Ten and AVCA first-team All-American Honours. She helped lead her team to the National Championship match, where they lost to the Texas Longhorns. She was also AVCA North Regional Player of the Year. In her senior year, she started all 36 matches and averaged 2.78 kills per set with a .233 hitting percentage, and was named to the All-Big Ten team again.

While at Nebraska, Beason won two Big Ten Conference Titles with her team. She was a captain of the Nebraska squad and participated in Volleyball Day in Nebraska which set a world record for attendance at a women's sporting event. She graduated in 2024 with a degree in Child, Youth and Family Studies.

== Professional career ==
Beason was drafted to the Atlanta Vibe of the Pro Volleyball Federation in November 2024, as the number one pick in the draft. The team lost in the semi-finals of the 2025 PVF Championships. Beason was selected for and played in the league's inaugural All-Star match.

She signed with the Omaha Supernovas in the 2025 season, where her former collegiate coach John Cook is now General Manager and part owner.

== International career ==
Beason earned Silver with the United States National Team at the 2024 NORCECA Final Six in the Dominican Republic.

At the youth level, she was named MVP of the 2022 Pan-American Cup, where she helped the U.S. Women's U21 National Team win gold In the summer of 2025, Beason was selected to train with the U23 National Team ahead of the NORCECA U23 Pan American Cup.

== Coaching career ==
In March 2025, it was announced that Beason would take a job as Head Coach of her former high school volleyball program.
