= Brittany Abercrombie =

Puerto Rican-American volleyball player (born 1995)

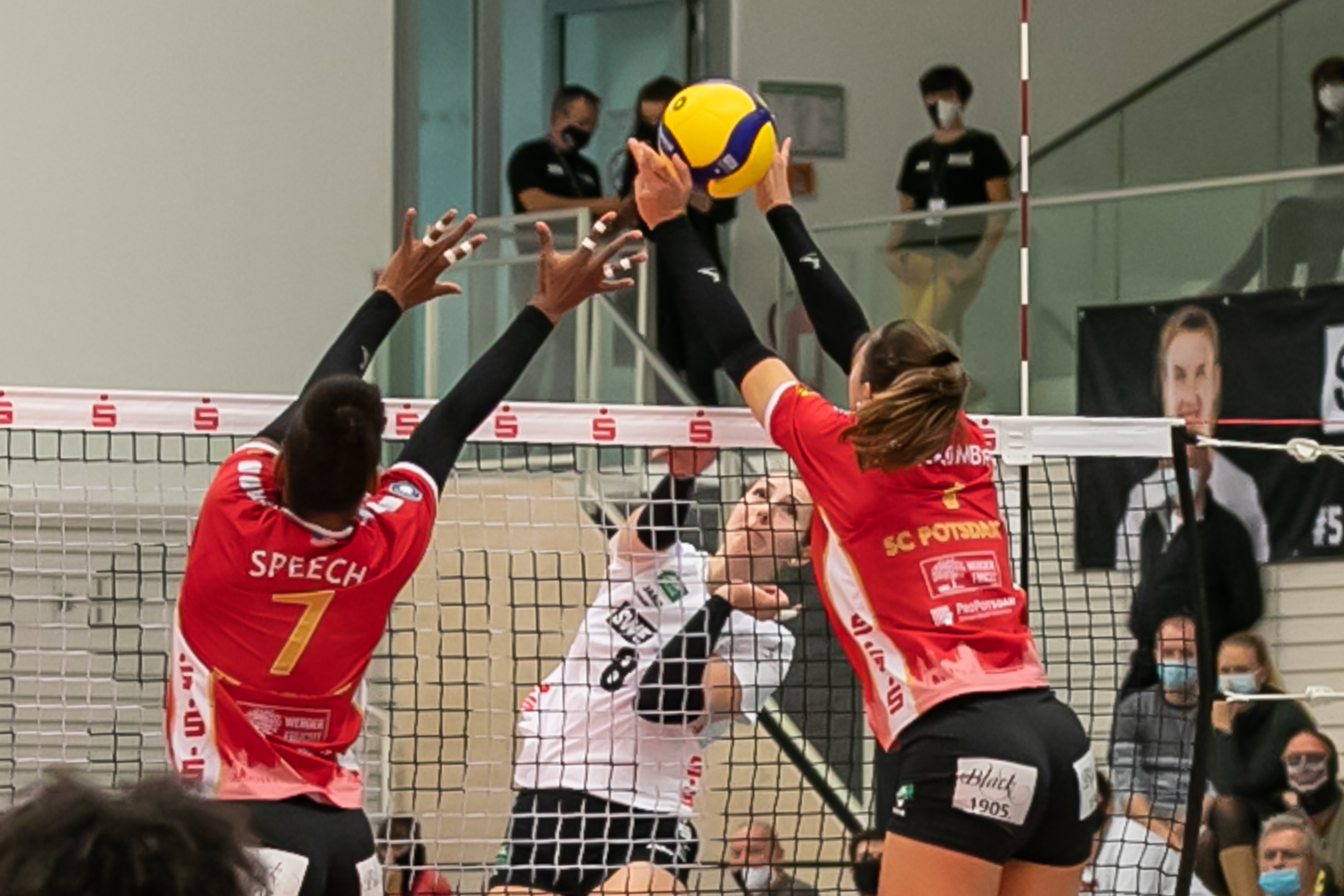

Personal information
- Nationality: American, Puerto Rican
- Born: December 28, 1995 (age 30); Escondido, California, U.S.
- Height: 1.92 m (6 ft 4 in)
- Education: USC Trojans

Volleyball information
- Position: Opposite spiker
- Current team: Orlando Valkyries
- Number: 6

Career
Years	Teams
2018–2019	Radomka
2019–2021	SC Potsdam
2021–2023	Pinkin de Corozal
2021–2023	Adam
2023–2024	Hwaseong IBK Altos
2024	Athletes Unlimited Pro Volleyball
2025–	Orlando Valkyries

National team
2021–2023	Puerto Rico
Honours
Women's volleyball
Representing Puerto Rico
NORCECA Championship
Silver medal – second place	2021 Mexico	Team

Brittany Abercrombie (born December 28, 1995) is a professional volleyball player who plays as an opposite spiker for the Major League Volleyball team Orlando Valkyries. Born in the mainland United States, she represented the Puerto Rico national team.

== Youth and college career ==
Abercrombie's career began with her youth basketball career at Coast and her high school career at La Costa Canyon High School, competing in California high school tournaments. After graduating, she joined the USC Trojans, playing in NCAA Division I from 2014 to 2017.

== Club career ==
A few months after the start of the 2018–19 season, Abercrombie signed her first professional contract with Radomka of the Polish Women's Volleyball League, while in the following season she moved to SC Potsdam of the German Women's Volleyball League, remaining there for two years before arriving in Puerto Rico, where she took part in the Liga de Voleibol Superior Femenino 2021 with Pinkin de Corozal, being employed as a local player.

For the 2021-22 championship, Abercrombie joined the Turkish team Adam, playing in Voleybol 1. Ligi. At the end of her commitments with the Anatolian club, she took part in the Liga de Voleibol Superior Femenino 2022, again with Pinkin de Corozal, winning the championship and being awarded the rising star prize. After another championship with Adam, she returned to Pinkin for the finals of the Liga de Voleibol Superior Femenino 2023, winning the championship again.

In the 2023–24 season, Abercrombie landed in the South Korean V-League, as she was selected as the first pick of the draft by the IBK Altos, being awarded as MVP of the third round. She then participated in the Athletes Unlimited 2024, becoming champion of the tournament and being awarded as best opposite hitter. She was then signed by the Orlando Valkyries for the 2025 PVF season, going on to win the national title, as well as receiving the award as best player of the regular season, that as best opposite hitter and also being included in the All-PVF First Team.

== International career ==
In 2021, Abercrombie obtained Puerto Rican sporting nationality, making her debut with the Puerto Rico national team at the 2021 NORCECA Championship, where she won the silver medal, followed by the bronze medal at the 2022 FIVB Women's Volleyball Challenger Cup and at the 2022 NORCECA Final Six. After winning the silver medal at the 2023 Central American and Caribbean Games and at the Women's Pan-American Volleyball Cup, in March 2024 she announced her retirement from the national team.

== Personal life ==
As of 2023, Abercrombie is in a relationship with fellow volleyball player Pedro Nieves.

== Honours ==
=== College ===
- 2017 All-America Third Team

=== Individual ===
- 2022 Liga de Voleibol Superior Femenino "Rising Star"
- 2024 V-League "MVP 3rd round"
- 2024 Athletes Unlimited Volleyball "Best Opposite"
- 2025 Pro Volleyball Federation "Regular season MVP"
- 2025 Pro Volleyball Federation "Best Opposite"
- 2025 Pro Volleyball Federation "All-PVF First Team"

=== Clubs ===
- 2022 Liga de Voleibol Superior Femenino – Champion, with Pinkin de Corozal
- 2023 Liga de Voleibol Superior Femenino – Champion, with Pinkin de Corozal
- 2025 Pro Volleyball Federation – Champions, with Orlando Valkyries

=== National team ===
- 2022 FIVB Women's Volleyball Challenger Cup
- 2022 NORCECA Women's Final Six
- 2023 Central American and Caribbean Games
- 2023 Women's Pan-American Volleyball Cup
