= Dan Fisher (volleyball) =

American volleyball player and coach (born 1976)

- Fisher in 2026

Current position
- Title: Head coach
- Team: Pittsburgh
- Conference: ACC
- Record: 376–75 (.834)
- Annual salary: $521,833.00

Biographical details
- Born: March 19, 1976 (age 50); Goleta, California
- Education: University of the Pacific (BA, MA)

Playing career
- 1995–1996: Hawai'i
- 1997: Cal State Northridge
- 1998–1999: Pacific
- 2000–2001: United States

Coaching career (HC unless noted)
- 1999–2000: (Belgium) Prefaxis Menen
- 2002: Club Santa Barbara 16's
- 2003–2004: (Switzerland) Appenzell Gotten Girl's Youth
- 2004–2007: Pacific (Assistant, Men's/Women's)
- 2007: (United States) U.S. Men's National Team (Assistant)
- 2007–2009: San Francisco (Associate HC)
- 2009–2011: Hawai'i (Associate HC)
- 2011–2012: Concordia Irvine
- 2012: (United States) U.S. Women's National Team (Assistant)
- 2013–present: Pittsburgh
- 2015–2016: (United States) U.S. Women's National Team (Assistant)
- 2020–2021: (United States) U.S. Women's Jr. National Team

Head coaching record
- Overall: 451–77 (.854)

Accomplishments and honors

Championships
- NAIA National Championship (2012); 7x ACC Champions (2017–2019, 2022–2025)

Awards
- AVCA Division I National Coach of the Year (2024); NAIA/AVCA National Coach of the Year (2011); NAIA Tournament Coach of the Year (2012); 5x AVCA East Region Coach of the Year (2017, 2018, 2022, 2024–2025); 3x ACC Coach of the Year (2017, 2018, 2024)
Medal record
Head coach for the United States women's volleyball
Pan American Games
Gold medal – first place	2015 Toronto	Indoor
Pan-American Cup
Bronze medal – third place	2016 Pan-American Cup	Indoor
U21 Pan American Cup
Gold medal – first place	2023 Mexico

Daniel Thomas Fisher (born March 19, 1976) is an American retired indoor and beach volleyball player. He is the current head coach of the University of Pittsburgh women's volleyball team.

== Personal life ==
Fisher is a native of Goleta, California. He graduated from Pacific in 1999 with a major in sociology and minor in religious studies. In 2008, he returned to Pacific as an assistant coach on the men and women's team and simultaneously earned a master's degree in sport science.

Fisher is married to Joni Fisher. They have a daughter, Eden, and son, Max. Fisher enjoys playing the guitar/ukulele in his spare time.

== Playing career ==
Fisher began his collegiate volleyball career at Hawai'i where he played for two years. He transferred to Cal State Northridge but eventually left after playing for them for one year because they cut their men's volleyball program. He eventually settled on University of the Pacific and played for them until his graduation in 1999. After graduation, he played professionally in Europe for five years, including three in Spain and one season each in Belgium and Switzerland.

Fisher also represented team USA in both indoor and beach. He competed for five years on the AVP Professional Beach Volleyball Tour earning a pair of 13th-place finishes. He also represented team USA on the indoor side during tournaments in Japan and France in 2000 and 2001.

== Coaching career ==
Fisher began his coaching career overseas, coaching Club Volleyball Menen for the 1999–2000 season and later spent the 2003–04 season coaching the Volleyball Club Appenzell Gotten Girl's Youth in Switzerland. Fisher also coached the Club Santa Barbara 16's in 2002. Prior to becoming a head coach, Fisher had various assistant coaching roles with multiple teams including San Francisco, Hawai'i, Pacific and the U.S. men's and women's national teams. He led the U.S. women's national team to a gold medal in the 2015 Pan American games and a bronze medal in the 2016 Pan American Cup.

=== Concordia Irvine ===
Fisher's first collegiate head coach job took him to Concordia University Irvine, where he led the team to two straight appearances in the NAIA National Championship match, winning the title in 2012. In his two years at Concordia, his teams went undefeated in conference play and had an overall 75–2 record.

His first season performance captured the attention of the volleyball community. The following summer, Hugh McCutcheon invited him to serve as an assistant with Team USA at the 2012 Pan American Cup, where he also coached alongside Hall of Fame coach Mike Hebert. After helping Team USA to a gold medal in the tournament, Hebert pulled Fisher aside and said he would put a good word in for him if he ever decided to try to go for a coaching job in an NCAA Division I school. After leading Concordia to the NAIA National Championship in 2012, Division I interest quickly started to build in Fisher.

=== Pittsburgh ===
In 2013, Fisher was named the head coach for the women's volleyball team at Pittsburgh. When Fisher took the helm at Pittsburgh, they were not a program in contention for national rankings and had not reached an NCAA Tournament since 2004.

In his first season, the Panthers began to show strength as they took then-No. 22 Purdue to five sets. He guided Pittsburgh to its highest totals in the following categories since 2009: hitting percentage (.230), kills/set (13.27), total kills (1725), assists/set (12.58), total assists (1635) and total aces (208) The Panthers chipped away for the next couple of seasons and reached the NCAA Tournament in 2016, their first trip since 2004. Then, Fisher led the Panthers to three straight ACC conference titles in 2017, 2018, and 2019. In 2020, despite the Panthers finishing 3rd in conference play, they advanced to the NCAA Elite Eight, the program's highest ever finish.

In 2021, Fisher led Pittsburgh to the first NCAA final four appearance in school history. The team defeated UMBC, Penn State, Kansas, and Purdue leading up the final four before losing to Nebraska by a score of 3–1. Pittsburgh finished the season with a 30–4 record.

In 2022, Pittsburgh was the Co-ACC champions with Louisville, going 17–1 in conference play and advanced to its second straight NCAA final four, eliminating defending 2021 NCAA champion Wisconsin in the Elite Eight.

In 2023, Pitt shared the ACC Championship with Florida State, going 16–2 in conference play and advanced to its third consecutive NCAA Final Four. The Panthers defeated Louisville in a reverse sweep win the Elite Eight.

In 2024, Pitt began the year with an undefeated 15–0 record (going 45–1 in sets played) and again won the ACC championship, this time outright with a 19–1 record. Despite their first loss to SMU in five sets on October 12, Pitt remained the top ranked team in the country for the remainder of the regular season. For the fourth straight time, Fisher led the team to the 2024 NCAA final four, after defeating Morehead State, Oklahoma, Oregon, and Kentucky. Pitt, the overall top seed, would be denied a chance to play for a title after losing to conference foe Louisville in four sets. Fisher was named the 2024 AVCA Division I National Coach of the Year.

In 2025, Pitt again won the ACC championship, sharing the conference title with Stanford. For the fifth straight season, Fisher led the team to the 2025 NCAA final four. Pitt, the overall national 4 seed, would be denied a chance to play for a title after losing to Texas A&M in three sets.

== Head coaching record ==
Record table
Season	Team	Overall	Conference	Standing	Postseason
Concordia Irvine (Golden State Athletic Conference) (2011–2012)
2011	Concordia Irvine	37–2	18–0	1st	NAIA National Runner-Up
2012	Concordia Irvine	38–0	18–0	1st	NAIA National Champions
Concordia Irvine:		75–2 (.974)	36–0 (1.000)		
Pittsburgh (Atlantic Coast Conference) (2013–present)
2013	Pittsburgh	19–14	11–9	T–5th	
2014	Pittsburgh	25–6	13–5	5th	
2015	Pittsburgh	23–9	13–7	5th	
2016	Pittsburgh	25–9	15–5	T–3rd	NCAA Second Round
2017	Pittsburgh	26–7	18–2	T–1st	NCAA Second Round
2018	Pittsburgh	30–2	17–1	1st	NCAA Second Round
2019	Pittsburgh	30–2	18–0	1st	NCAA Second Round
2020	Pittsburgh	19–5	14–4	3rd	NCAA Regional Final
2021	Pittsburgh	30–4	15–3	T–2nd	NCAA Final Four
2022	Pittsburgh	31–4	17–1	T–1st	NCAA Final Four
2023	Pittsburgh	29–5	16–2	T–1st	NCAA Final Four
2024	Pittsburgh	33–2	19–1	1st	NCAA Final Four
2025	Pittsburgh	30–5	18–2	T–1st	NCAA Final Four
2026	Pittsburgh	26–1	16–1		TBD
Pittsburgh:		376–75 (.834)	220–43 (.837)		
Total:		451–77 (.854)			
National champion Postseason invitational champion Conference regular season champion Conference regular season and conference tournament champion Division regular season champion Division regular season and conference tournament champion Conference tournament champion
