= Elena Scott =

American volleyball player (born 2003)

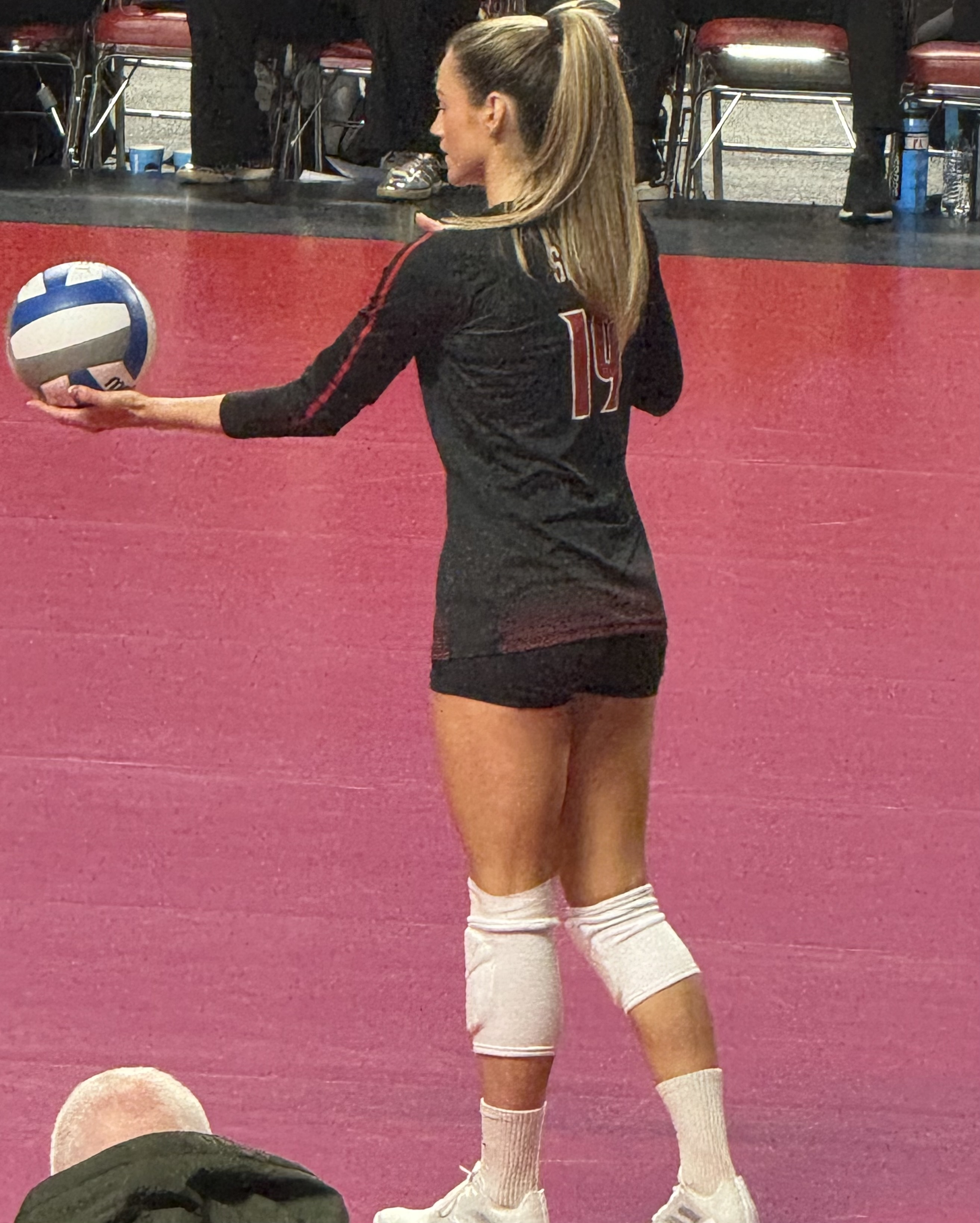
- Scott in 2024

Personal information
- Born: July 1, 2003 (age 23)
- Hometown: Louisville, Kentucky
- Height: 5 ft 9 in (175 cm)
- Education: Louisville (2021–2024)

Volleyball information
- Position: Libero / defensive specialist
- Current club: (United States) Indy Ignite

Elena Scott (born July 1, 2003) is an American volleyball player for the Indy Ignite of the Pro Volleyball Federation. She played collegiately at Louisville Cardinals. A libero or defensive specialist, she was a three-time AVCA All-American and two-time Atlantic Coast Conference Defensive Player of the Year.

== Early life ==
Scott grew up in Louisville, Kentucky, the daughter of Sheri and Robert Scott. She attended Mercy Academy and played club volleyball for PNK Volleyball.

== College career ==
Scott made 3.81 digs per set in her freshman season with the Louisville Cardinals, having been moved from setter to libero by head coach Dani Busboom Kelly. She helped Louisville go 32–0 before falling to Wisconsin in the semifinals of the 2021 national championship. She was named Atlantic Coast Conference all-freshman and second-team All-ACC. In her sophomore season, she made 3.91 digs per set as Louisville finished 31–3 and runner-up to Texas in the 2022 national championship game. She was named first-team All-ACC and AVCA second-team All-American. She recorded a career-high 4.47 digs per set in her junior season, repeating as first-team All-ACC and second-team All-American and being named the ACC Defensive Player of the Year. Louisville went 27–5 and reached the NCAA tournament regional finals. In her senior season, she earned first-team All-American honors and her second ACC Defensive Player nod as Louisville reached the 2024 national title game.

== Pro career ==
In November 2024, the Indy Ignite selected Scott as the first pick of the second round (ninth overall).
