= San Diego Mojo =

Major League Volleyball (MLV) team in San Diego, California

- Sport: Volleyball
- Founded: 2023
- Folded: 2026
- League: Major League Volleyball
- Based in: San Diego, California
- Arena: Viejas Arena
- Colors: Navy, light blue, yellow and white
- Owner: Gary E. Jacobs
- Head coach: Alisha Glass
- Website: sandiegomojovb.com

The San Diego Mojo were a women's professional indoor volleyball team based in San Diego, California, that competed in Major League Volleyball (MLV). The team played its home games at Viejas Arena. The Mojo began play in the league's inaugural 2024 season.

== History ==
On May 25, 2023, San Diego was announced as the sixth city to receive a Pro Volleyball Federation franchise for the league's inaugural season, owned by beach volleyball legend Kerri Walsh Jennings. Two-time Olympic silver medallist Tayyiba Haneef-Park was hired as the team's head coach, later joined by assistant coach Deitre Collins, a member of the American Volleyball Coaches Association Hall of Fame. The Mojo name, logo, and colors were announced on November 9, 2023.

=== 2024 season ===
In their inaugural match on February 1, 2024, the Mojo were swept by the Atlanta Vibe in three sets, 17–25, 15–25, 16–25. The Mojo went on to earn their first victory in team history on February 23, defeating the Grand Rapids Rise in four sets, 36–34, 25–27, 25–23, 25–23, in their home opener in front of a crowd of over 6,000. They set a new team attendance record on April 7, beating the Columbus Fury in four sets in front of an announced crowd of 8,938. After losing eight of their first 12 matches, the Mojo finished their inaugural season with a record of 13–11 and earned the third overall seed in the PVF playoffs. San Diego faced the second-seeded Omaha Supernovas in the semifinals and were defeated in five sets, 20–25, 16–25, 25–18, 25–8, 15–11. Haneef-Park was named the Coach of the Year, while Nootsara Tomkom won the Setter of the Year award.

=== 2026 season ===
On May 7, 2026, San Diego Mojo played their semifinal game for the 2026 season playoffs against the Dallas Pulse in Frisco, Texas. The team fell short, losing the semifinal round in four sets against Pulse. This game marked the end of the club's third and final season, because a week prior, the club announced that they would not be returning for the MLV 2027 season. Despite their decision not to return in the following season, Major League Volleyball announced a statement with Mojo describing their assistance in finding possible new investors and support for the club’s future in San Diego. Players Marin Grote and Shara Venegas earned First and Second Team All-MLV honors following the end of the 2026 season.

== Roster ==
Current as of January 18, 2026.

Number	Player	Position	Height	College/Club
2	(Puerto Rico) Shara Venegas	Libero	5'7"	Universidad Metropolitana
4	(United States) Allison Jacobs	Outside hitter	5'11"	Michigan/UCLA
5	(United States) Kayla Caffey	Middle blocker	6'0"	Texas/Nebraska/Missouri
6	(Serbia) Jovana Brakočević	Opposite hitter	6'3"	
9	(United States) Grace Loberg	Outside hitter	6'3"	Wisconsin
10	(United States) Taylor Sandbothe	Middle blocker	6'2"	Ohio State
11	(United States) Morgan Lewis	Opposite hitter	6'3"	Oregon
12	(United States) Marin Grote	Middle blocker	6'4"	Washington
14	(United States) McKenna Vicini	Middle blocker	6'2"	Stanford
16	(United States) Karis Watson	Middle blocker	6'2"	Clemson
17	(United States) Kate Georgiades	Libero	5'9"	Houston
18	(United States) Morgan Perkins	Middle blocker	6'1"	Texas A&M, Oklahoma
21	(United States) Marlie Monserez	Setter	6'0"	Florida, UCLA
22	(United States) Shannon Scully	Outside hitter, Libero	6'2"	USC/Pepperdine/Utah
31	(United States) Maya Tabron	Outside hitter	6'0"	Colorado, SMU
33	(United States) Hayden Kubik	Outside hitter	6'2"	Tennessee/Nebraska
44	(United States) Carly Graham	Setter	6'0"	Rice
