= Luka Slabe =

Slovenian volleyball player and coach

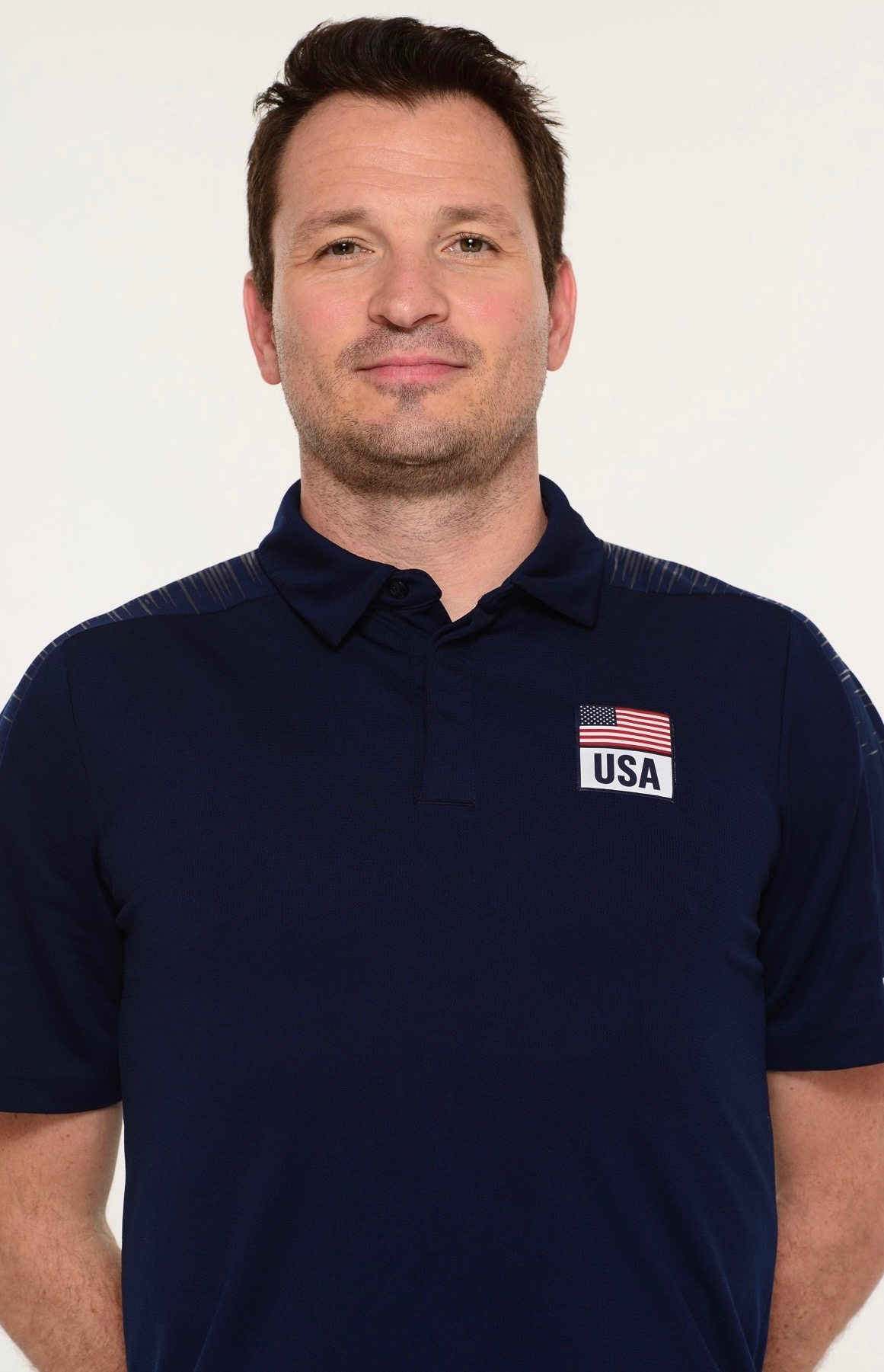

Medal record

Volleyball

Representing the United States

Olympic Games
Gold medal – first place	2020 Tokyo Japan	Indoor W

FIVB World Cup
Silver medal – second place	2019 Japan Japan	Indoor W

Volleyball Nations League
Gold medal – first place	2018 Nanjing China	Indoor W
Gold medal – first place	2019 Nanjing China	Indoor W
Gold medal – first place	2021 Rimini Italy	Indoor W
Silver medal – second place	2026 Ningbo China	Indoor M

NORCECA Championships
Gold medal – first place	2026 Moncton Canada	Indoor M

NCAA
Gold medal – first place	2001 Brigham Young University United States	Player
Silver medal – second place	2003 Brigham Young University United States	Player
Silver medal – second place	2016 Brigham Young University United States	Coach M
Silver medal – second place	2017 Brigham Young University United States	Coach M

Leagues
Gold medal – first place	2009 D2 UKO Kropa Slovenia	Player/Coach
Silver medal – second place	2011 UKO Kropa (Cup) Slovenia	Player/Coach
Silver medal – second place	2011 UKO Kropa (Championship) Slovenia	Player/Coach
Silver medal – second place	2012 Calcit Kamnik (Cup) Slovenia	Coach M
Silver medal – second place	2012 Calcit Kamnik (Championship) Slovenia	Coach M
Gold medal – first place	2013 ACH Volley Ljubljana (Cup) Slovenia	Coach M
Gold medal – first place	2013 ACH Volley Ljubljana (Championship) Slovenia	Coach M
Gold medal – first place	2013 ACH Volley Ljubljana (MEVZA) Slovenia	Coach M
Gold medal – first place	2014 ACH Volley Ljubljana (Championship) Slovenia	Coach M
Gold medal – first place	2014 ACH Volley (MEVZA) Ljubljana Slovenia	Coach M
Silver medal – second place	2015 Aich Dob (Championship) Austria	Coach M
Silver medal – second place	2015 Aich Dob (MEVZA) Austria	Coach M

Luka Slabe (born July 14, 1977) is a Slovenian former volleyball player and current coach. As an Assistant Coach for Karch Kiraly, he won a gold Olympic medal with USA Women's National Team in 2020 Tokyo Summer Olympic Games. He is a former Head Coach of Slovenia Men's National Team and North Carolina State University Volleyball Team. He has also spent three seasons coaching in the European Champions League as a Head Coach of ACH Volley from Ljubljana, Slovenia and Aich Dob, Austria. He is currently serving as an Assistant coach for a USA Men's National team.

== Biography ==
Luka Slabe was born in Ljubljana, Slovenia. He began playing volleyball at the age of 12 at his elementary school OŠ Danile Kumar, and his local club. After completing his High school, he joined Brigham Young University Cougars from Provo, Utah where he played for prominent volleyball figures: dr.Carl McGown, Hugh McCutcheon, Troy Tanner. After graduating from Brigham Young University, and receiving his bachelor's degree in Exercise Science, he spent a few season playing professionally, before taking his first coaching job with Slovenian club UKO Kropa as a player/coach. For the next six years, he coached in Europe and his native Slovenia Men's National Team, before returning to his alma mater, Brigham Young University in 2015. In 2018, he joined Karch Kiraly and USA Women's Volleyball National Team in its pursuit of the first-ever gold Olympic medal in the 2020 Tokyo Summer Olympics. After the Olympic Games, he became a Head Coach at North Carolina State University. In 2025, he re-joined Karch Kiraly and USA Men's National Team to compete in 2028 Los Angeles Olympic Games.

== Honours ==
- 2021 - The Order Of Ikkos
