= Leketor Member-Meneh =

American volleyball player

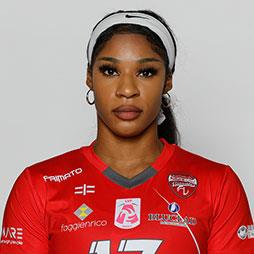
- Member-Meneh in 2022

Personal information
- Nationality: United States
- Born: June 1, 1999 (age 27); St. Louis, Missouri, U.S.
- Hometown: St. Louis, Missouri, U.S.
- Height: 174 cm (5 ft 9 in)
- Education: Missouri/Pittsburgh

Volleyball information
- Position: Outside hitter
- Current club: (United States) Indy Ignite

Career
Years	Teams
2017–2020	(United States) Missouri
2021	(United States) Pittsburgh
2022–2023	(Italy) Futura Volley Giovani (it)
2024	(United States) Atlanta Vibe
2025–	(United States) Indy Ignite

Leketor Member-Meneh (born June 1, 1999) is an American professional volleyball player who plays as an outside hitter for the Indy Ignite of the Pro Volleyball Federation. She played collegiately at the University of Missouri and University of Pittsburgh, where she was an All-American in 2021.

== Personal life ==
Member-Meneh was born and raised in St. Louis, Missouri. She has seven brothers and sisters. She attended high school at Lutheran High School South in St. Louis, and was also a track & field player. She helped her high school team to its first ever volleyball state title in 2016. She was considered a top 50 recruit in her graduating class. She chose to attend Missouri over offers from Duke, Kansas State, North Carolina State and St. Louis.

== Career ==
=== College ===
Member-Meneh played four seasons at Missouri, and transferred to Pittsburgh in 2021, using the extra year of eligibility granted by the NCAA due to the COVID-19 pandemic.

At Pittsburgh in 2021, she helped Pittsburgh reach the NCAA Final Four for the first time in school history. She was named an AVCA All-America Second Team selection and was Pittsburgh's sole selection to the 2021 NCAA Final Four All-Tournament Team. During the tournament, she tied the Pitt record for most kills in a single NCAA Tournament match during the 25-point rally scoring era (2008–present) with 21 against Purdue in the regional final. During the season, she led Pitt with 3.22 kills and 3.74 points per set and was second on the team with 2.32 digs per set.

=== Professional clubs ===
- (Italy) Futura Volley Giovani (it) (2022–2023)
- (United States) Atlanta Vibe (2024)
- (United States) Indy Ignite (2025-)

Futura Volley Giovani announced her signing on May 31, 2022.

Member-Meneh came back to her home country of the United States to play for the Atlanta Vibe of the Pro Volleyball Federation in their inaugural 2024 season, before moving on to Indy Ignite for this expansion teams first season.

== Awards and honors ==
=== College ===
- AVCA All-America Second Team (2021)
- NCAA Final Four All-Tournament Team (2021)
- NCAA Regional All-Tournament MVP (Pittsburgh) (2021)
- All-ACC First Team (2021)
- All-SEC (2018)
- SEC All-Freshman Team (2017)
