= Lauren Bertolacci =

Australian volleyball coach

Personal information
- Nationality: Australian
- Born: 26 January 1985 (age 41)
- Height: 171 cm (67 in)
- Weight: 68 kg (150 lb)
- Spike: 283 cm (111 in)
- Block: 278 cm (109 in)

Coaching information
- Current team: Viteos NUC
- Previous teams coached
- Years: Teams
- –: Volley Luzern Men

Volleyball information
- Number: 10 (national team)

Career
- Years: Team
- 2013–2015: Viteos NUC
- 2012: VfB Suhl
- 2011: TSV Düdingen
- 2009–2011: CV Cuesta Piedra
- 2007–2009: Chemnitz
- 2006: Hainaut Volley

National team
- Years: Team
- 2005–2015: Australia
- 2022-current: Switzerland

Lauren Bertolacci (born 26 January 1985) is an Australian volleyball coach. She is currently the head coach of Major League Volleyball's Indy Ignite in the United States. She also serves as the head coach for the Swiss Women's National Team. Prior to that she coached Volley Luzern Men's Team in the NLA, the top division in Switzerland.

Lauren was an Australian female volleyball player. She was part of the Australia women's national volleyball team, from 2005 to 2015.

She participated in the 2014 FIVB Volleyball World Grand Prix. On club level she played for FC Luzern in 2014.
