= Pittsburgh Panthers women's volleyball =

American college volleyball team

- Founded: 1974; 52 years ago
- University: University of Pittsburgh
- Head coach: Dan Fisher (14th season)
- Conference: ACC
- Location: Pittsburgh, Pennsylvania, US
- Home arena: Victory Heights Arena (capacity: 3,005)
- Nickname: Panthers
- Colors: Blue and gold

AIAW/NCAA tournament semifinal
- 2021, 2022, 2023, 2024, 2025

AIAW/NCAA Regional Final
- 2020*, 2021, 2022, 2023, 2024, 2025

AIAW/NCAA regional semifinal
- 1978, 1981, 1990, 2020*, 2021, 2022, 2023, 2024, 2025

AIAW/NCAA tournament appearance
- 1978, 1979, 1981, 1982, 1984, 1986, 1987, 1990, 1991, 1992, 1993, 1994, 2003, 2004, 2016, 2017, 2018, 2019, 2020*, 2021, 2022, 2023, 2024, 2025

Regional AIAW tournament appearance
- 1974, 1975, 1976, 1977, 1978, 1979, 1980, 1981

Conference tournament champion
- 1982, 1984, 1986, 1988, 1989, 1990, 1991, 1992, 1993, 1994, 2003

Conference regular season champion
- 1990, 1991, 1992, 1993, 1994, 2003, 2017, 2018, 2019, 2022, 2023, 2024, 2025 *Played in Spring 2021

Pittsburgh Panthers women's volleyball is the NCAA Division I intercollegiate volleyball program of the University of Pittsburgh, often referred to as "Pitt", located in Pittsburgh, Pennsylvania, United States. The Pitt volleyball team competes in the Atlantic Coast Conference (ACC) and plays their home games in Victory Heights Arena. Since the founding of the volleyball program in 1974, the Panthers have had a winning season in all but four years, have one of the nation's top all-time winning percentages, have appearances in 24 national championship tournaments in which they have advanced to five national semifinals, and have won conference championships in 18 different seasons, including eleven as a member of the Big East Conference and seven since joining the ACC.

== History ==
=== The beginning ===
Pitt women's volleyball was founded in 1974 and was led during its first season by coach Mary Kromer who guided the team, originally nicknamed the Pantherettes, to a 14–3 record in their first year of existence. Perhaps more impressively, in the first year of the program, and despite the fact that two of the starters never played volleyball before, the team was invited to participate in the Eastern Association for Intercollegiate Athletics for Women (EAIAW) regional championship, where the team advanced to the quarterfinals. Kromer continued as coach for the programs second season, in which the team posted an 18–2 record and again appeared in the EAIAW regional championships.

=== Mike Hebert years ===
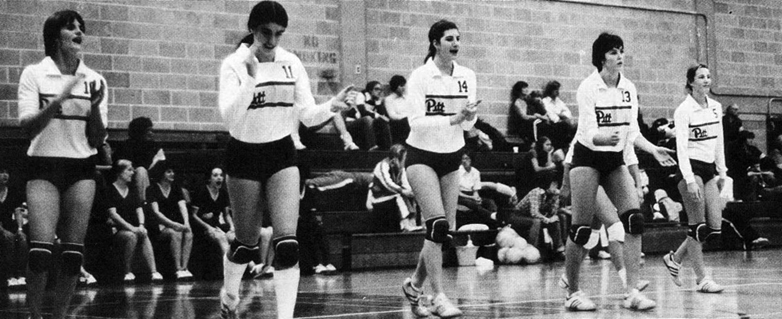
The 1978 Pitt volleyball team, coached by Mike Hebert and playing home games at Trees Hall, was the school's first to win the Eastern regional championship and advance to the collegiate volleyball national championships, then held by the AIAW, where they finished 13th in the nation.

Prior to the 1976 season, Mike Hebert, a former player at the UC-Santa Barbara who was teaching at Pitt, was asked by the university to coach the women's team although he'd never seen women play volleyball. He eventually accepted the part-time job to coach the up-start program for $1,500. Without many collegiate women's team sports in existence in the mid-1970s, Hebert and his team were pioneers who "invented things as [they] went along". Despite this, Herbert guided the Panthers to a fourth-place finish in the EAIAW championships during his first two seasons. Under his guidance, Pitt broke through to national prominence in 1978 winning the EAIAW Championship and advancing to the Association for Intercollegiate Athletics for Women (AIAW) National Large College Volleyball Championships where they finished with a 2–3 record and a 13th place national finish en route to the program's first 40-win season. His part-time position turning full-time in his final season in 1979, which saw the Panthers successfully defend their EAIAW Championship and earn a return trip to the AIWA national championships. During this span he also collected EAIAW Eastern Region Coach of the Year awards at Pitt in 1978 and 1979. Herbert, who also served as an assistant coach for Pitt's men's team for the last two years of his stay in Pittsburgh, then left, citing family reasons, to take the head coaching job at the New Mexico, eventually coaching at Illinois and Minnesota; along the way winning multiple national championships, the national coach of the year award, and earning induction into the American Volleyball Coaches Association Hall of Fame.

=== Shelton Collier years ===
The program next turned to Ohio State assistant Shelton Collier, who in his initial season as head coach in 1980 guided the Panthers to a school record with 41 wins, and followed up in 1981 with a season that included a win at eighth-ranked Pepperdine, an EAIWA Championship, and a ninth-place finish in the final year of the AIAW national championships. In 1982, the women's volleyball program transitioned both into the NCAA, which took over the sponsorship of intercollegiate athletics from the AIWA, as well as into the Big East Conference. In addition, the program permanently moved their home games from their primary home in Trees Hall to the larger Fitzgerald Field House, which had previously hosted select volleyball tournaments and games. During Collier's tenure, Pitt established itself as the dominant volleyball team in the Big East from the start, winning the regular season Big East Southern Division tournament, without losing a game and losing only one set, in every year in which it competed: 1982, 1983, and 1984. Pitt also won the first ever Big East Tournament in 1982 without losing a game en route to the program's second 41-win season. Collier guided Pitt to capture additional Big East Tournament crowns in 1984, 1986, and 1988 and appeared in the NCAA Women's Volleyball Championship in 1982, 1984, 1986, and 1987.

=== Sue Woodstra years ===
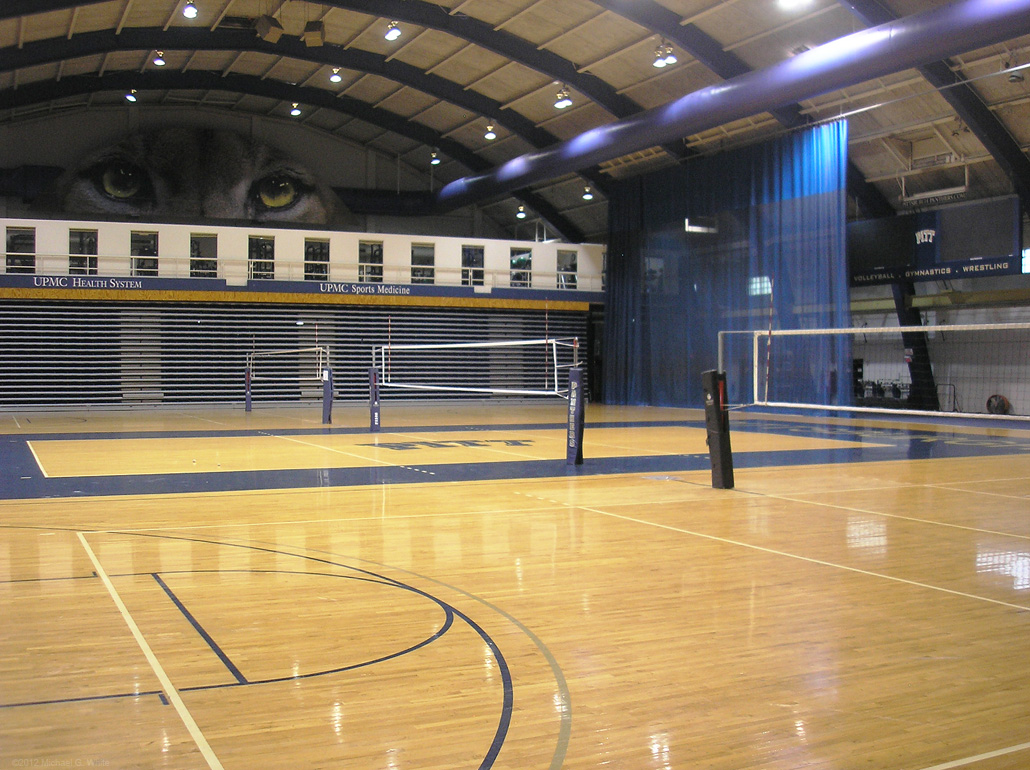
Volleyball courts in Fitzgerald Field House

Sue Woodstra, a silver medalist for the U.S. National Volleyball Team at the 1984 Summer Olympics, took over the Pitt program in 1989. During her tenure, she led her teams to Big East Conference tournament championships in each season as well as three Big East regular season championships, winning the regular season each year from when the Big East instituted round-robin play in 1990. She also led the Panthers to four post-season appearances including one Women's Invitation Volleyball Championship appearance in 1989 in which Pitt finished third, and three NCAA volleyball tournaments, including in 1990 where Pitt reached the regional semifinal and finished ranked 18th in the final American Volleyball Coaches Association (AVCA) Coaches poll. Woodstra's teams NCAA tournament teams were led by standout second team All-American outside hitter Ann Marie Lucanie, who won the Big East Tournament MVP award four straight years as well as a record three straight Big East Player of the Year awards, including in her senior year in 1993 under new head coach Cindy Alvear. In total, Woodstra compiled an overall record of 110–39 (.738) over four seasons as head coach.

=== Alvear and Beerman years ===
Cindy Alvear took over in 1993, leading Pitt to Big East regular season championships, Big East Tournament championships, and NCAA Tournament appearances in her first two seasons. This was followed by second-place finishes in both the Big East regular season and tournaments in 1995 and 1996 with a National Invitational Volleyball tournament appearance in 1995. Pitt program slipped in the late 1990s, experiencing its first losing Big East record in 1999. Chris Beerman took over the program in 2000 and helped lead the team back to a winning conference record. A losing record in 2001, Pitt's first ever, snapped one of the longest NCAA records for consecutive winning seasons. However, the Panthers rebounded in a big way in 2003 by winning the Big East regular season and tournament championship and advancing into the second round of the NCAA tournament. A second-place Big East finish and an at-large bid to the NCAA tournament followed in 2004, before the program experienced only its third losing season in 2007.

=== Toby Rens years ===
Toby Rens was hired to take over the program in 2008, immediately restoring the program to a winning season and his first year. In 2009, despite being picked to finish eighth in the Big East, Rens guided the Panthers to a school record twelve Big East wins and a second-place finish behind Big East Player of the Year and third team All-American middle hitter Meagan Dooley. Heading into the 2010 season, the Panthers faced ten 2009 NCAA Tournament participants, but faltered to 13–18 record and a loss in the first round of the Big East Tournament. This was followed by an 18–15 record and a 17–14 record in 2011 and 2012, respectively. Following the 2012 season, Rens accepted the head coaching job at Chicago State University.

=== Dan Fisher era ===
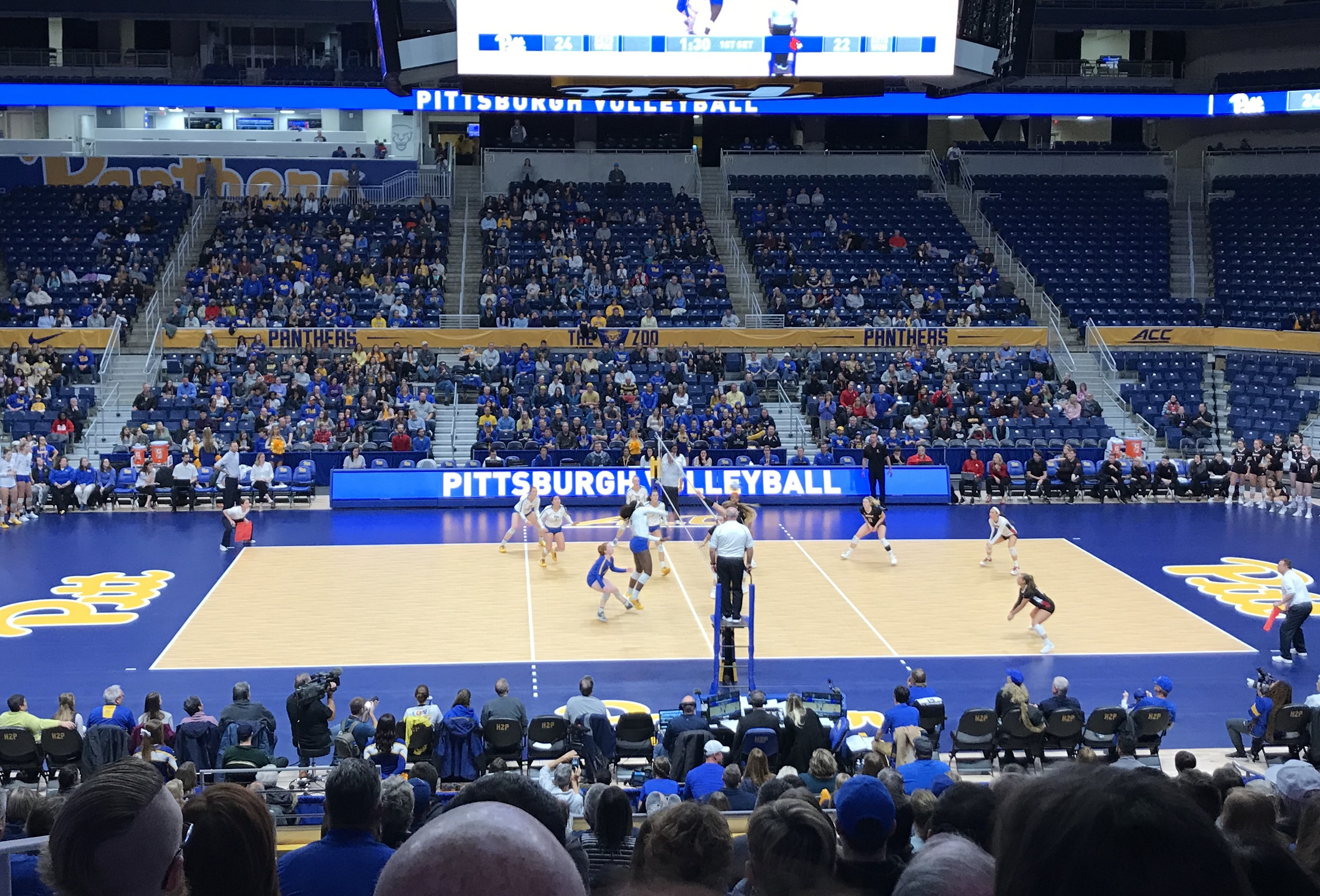
Pitt completing an 18-0 ACC conference season with a defeat of Louisville at the Petersen Events Center on November 27, 2019

Dan Fisher arrived as head coach the same year that Pitt entered the Atlantic Coast Conference in 2013. Fisher, who led Concordia University-Irvine to the 2012 NAIA national championship with an overall two-year record of 72–2, led Pitt to a fifth-place finish in its first year in the ACC, exceeding pre-season expectations that had Pitt picked to finish 13th in the conference. Pitt improved to 25–6 in Fisher's second year at Pitt. He led the Panthers back to the NCAA tournament in 2016 and 2017, as well as to the program's first ACC conference championship in 2017, for which he received ACC and AVCA East Coast Region Coach of the Year honors. In 2018, he led Pitt to its first top five AVCA coaches poll ranking in program history and its second straight ACC Championship and earned his second straight ACC Coach of the Year honors. In 2019, the program reached the highest national ranking ever achieved by an ACC team when it was voted #2 in the AVCA coaches poll, won its third straight ACC conference championship with an 18-0 conference record, and received a program best sixth seed in the NCAA tournament. In the 2020 season, the NCAA postponed the volleyball tournament to April due to the COVID-19 pandemic. As a result, the ACC scheduled was altered to eight fall matches and the remainder in the spring. After a 4–4 record in the fall schedule, the Panthers won twelve straight matches to finish the regular season 16–4. In the NCAA tournament, the Panthers made program history by advancing past the second round for the first time after a sweep of #14 overall seed Utah. In the following round, Pitt upset #3 overall seed Minnesota in five sets to advance to its first Regional Final in school history. Pitt finished the season ranked #8 on the final AVCA Coaches’ Poll, their highest final ranking in program history.

In the 2021 season, the Panthers came back from their tournament run by starting the season 15–0, and finishing 26–3 and earning a program-high #3 seed in the NCAA tournament. In the second round of the tournament, the Panthers defeated rival Penn State for the first time in postseason history. Upon advancing, the Panthers earned the right to host their first regional, and held their first ever tournament matches at Fitzgerald Field House. In the Round of 16, the Panthers swept Kansas before meeting #6 Purdue in the Regional Final. After Purdue won a lengthy second set, 30–28, the Panthers powered from there winning the next two sets on its home floor to earn its first national semifinal appearance in program history.

The 2024 season was Pitt's most dominant, as they spent 12 consecutive weeks ranked #1 in the national AVCA poll, finished the regular season with a 33-1 record, and earned the top one seed for the post-season tournament. The program's success resulted in numerous awards, including sophomore opposite hitter Olivia Babcock being the first player in program history to be named the AVCA National Player of the Year and coach Dan Fisher being named the AVCA National Coach of the Year. In the tournament, the team advanced to its fourth straight national semifinal, where they lost to Louisville in four sets. In 2025, the team clinched a share of the ACC championship and was a number one seed in the tournament. The team advanced to its fifth-straight national semifinal appearance, in which they were swept by eventual champions Texas A&M. In her junior season, Olivia Babcock was once again named the AVCA National Player of the Year, becoming one of five NCAA players to win the award twice.

== Conference affiliations ==
- Independent (1974-1981)
- Big East Conference (1982–2012)
- Atlantic Coast Conference (2013–present)

== Venues ==
=== Trees Hall ===
Pitt volleyball played its early home matches in Trees Hall, the university’s multi-purpose recreational and athletics facility that opened in 1962. The program moved into the venue in 1974 as women’s varsity sports were expanding under the athletic department, making Trees Hall the first consistent home court in the program’s history. Its gym spaces were shared with physical education and intramural activities, but it provided a reliable on-campus site during the program’s foundational years. Pitt moved from Trees Hall to Fitzgerald Field House following the 1981 season.

=== Fitzgerald Field House ===
Pitt volleyball has played the majority of its home matches at Fitzgerald Field House since the late 20th century. Built in 1951 and named for former chancellor Rufus Fitzgerald, the Field House originally served as the university’s primary indoor athletics venue, including a five-decade run as the home of Pitt men’s and women’s basketball. The Fitzgerald Field House has been the main arena for volleyball from 1982 until 2025.

The facility has undergone several major renovations to modernize its athletic spaces. A substantial $3.8 million upgrade in 1999 expanded locker rooms, training rooms, and support areas, while a 2008 renovation added new volleyball courts and updated seating and electronic systems to meet NCAA standards. Today the Field House seats 2,864 spectators and continues to house training spaces for many Pitt Olympic sports, maintaining its role as a hub of daily athletics operations on campus.

=== Petersen Events Center ===
The Petersen Events Center, opened in 2002 on the former Pitt Stadium site, serves as Pitt volleyball’s auxiliary venue for high-demand matches and NCAA tournament hosting. Designed as a multi-purpose arena with a 12,508-seat capacity for basketball, “The Pete” provides Pitt volleyball with a significantly larger platform for marquee opponents, postseason play, and national broadcasts.

Although primarily home to Pitt men’s and women’s basketball, the Petersen Events Center has hosted several major volleyball events, including the opening weekend of the NCAA Tournament in 2018, 2019, and 2021. The arena’s size, modern amenities, and established game-day infrastructure have allowed Pitt to accommodate growing interest in the program while maintaining an NCAA-compliant setting for championship-level competition.

=== Victory Heights ===
In 2026, Pitt volleyball moved into the new Victory Heights Arena, a purpose-built competition venue designed specifically for volleyball, wrestling, and gymnastics. The facility is part of the university’s larger Victory Heights athletics master plan, which aims to replace the aging Fitzgerald Field House with modern, sport-specific spaces. The new arena features expanded seating, upgraded locker rooms, and enhanced broadcast, fan experience, and training capabilities. Victory Heights seats 3,005 for volleyball.

Victory Heights was built to become the permanent home of Pitt volleyball, consolidating practice, competition, and athlete support areas under one roof. The arena provides the program with the dedicated infrastructure necessary for continued growth, representing the most significant facilities investment in the history of Pitt women’s volleyball.

== Coaches ==
=== Coaching history ===
No.	Coach	Tenure	Overall	Conference
1	Mary Kromer	1974–1975	32–5 (.941)	0–0 (–)
2	Mike Hebert	1976–1979	127–53–3 (.702)	0–0–0 (–)
3	Shelton Collier	1980–1988	294–94 (.758)	0–0 (–)
4	Sue Woodstra	1989–1992	110-39 (.738)	19-2 (.905)
5	Cindy Alvear	1993–1999	128-84 (.604)	48-22 (.686)
6	Chris Beerman	2000–2007	154-90 (.631)	70-30 (.700)
7	Toby Rens	2008–2012	85-72 (.541)	41-30 (.577)
8	Dan Fisher	2013–present	320-68 (.825)	186-40 (.823)

=== Coaching staff ===
Coach	Position	First year	Alma mater
Dan Fisher	Head coach	2013	Pacific
Kellen Petrone	Associate head coach/recruiting coordinator	2014	Duquesne University
Kamalani Akeo	Assistant coach	2020	University of Pittsburgh
Michael Fisher	Assistant coach	2022	Saint Francis University
Logan Mosley	Director of operations	2025	University of Pittsburgh

== Team awards and accomplishments ==
=== Postseason national tournaments ===
Since the founding of its volleyball program in 1974, Pitt has participated in post-season volleyball tournaments in 26 different seasons. Post-season play includes 17 NCAA Women's Volleyball Championship tournament appearances, three AIAW National Championship appearances, eight EAIAW Regional championship appearances, and two NIVC tournament appearances.

==== AIWA ====
Prior to the NCAA taking on the administration of women's sports and championships in 1981, the AIWA and its regional affiliates conducted regional and national championships in volleyball. In 1981, schools could compete in either the AIWA and NCAA and both organizations held championships, but by 1982, only the NCAA remained.

===== Regionals =====
EAIWA Regional Championship appearances (8)

- 1974 (quarterfinals)
- 1975 (?)

- 1976 (4th)
- 1977 (4th)

- 1978 (1st)
- 1979 (1st)

- 1980 (3rd)
- 1981 (1st)

===== Nationals =====
AIWA national championship appearances (3)

- 1978 AIWA National Large College Volleyball Championship (2–3, 13th)

Preliminary pool

W Oregon 2–0
W Alabama 2–1
L Texas-Arlington 0–2
L San Jose State 0–2
L Hawaii 0–2

- 1981 AIWA National Division I Volleyball Championship (2–2, 9th)

Pool A

L Texas 15–6, 15–7, 15–10
L Michigan 15–8, 15–10, 14–16, 17–15

Consolation Bracket

W Ohio State 15–9, 15–9

9th Place

W California 15–12, 2–15, 16–14

- 1979 AIWA National Division I Volleyball Championship (1–3)

Pool 4

L Pacific 13–15, 6–15
W Southern Illinois 15–8, 15–12
L Pepperdine 15–11, 5–15, 13–15
L Ohio State 6–15, 2–15

==== NCAA ====
Pitt has participated in 21 NCAA Women's Volleyball Championships and has an overall record of 30–20 in the tournament.

- 1982

L San Luis Obispo (0–3) 9–15, 2–15, 5–15

- 1984

L Nebraska (0–3) 6–15, 10–15, 16–18

- 1986

L Nebraska (1–3) 15–11, 5–15, 10–15, 7–15

- 1987

L Illinois (1–3) 15–5, 4–15, 3–15, 2–15

- 1990

W Ohio State (3–1) 15–12, 15–13, 9–15, 15–13
L Nebraska (0–3) 7–15, 11–15, 7–15

- 1991

L Ohio State (1–3) 9–15, 15–17, 15–9, 7–15

- 1992

L Stanford (0–3) 3–15, 2–15, 4–15

- 1993

L George Washington (2–3) 13–15, 15–10, 9–15, 15–12, 13–15

- 1994

W Iowa (3–2) 5–15, 16–14, 4–15, 16–14, 15–10
L Notre Dame (1–3) 15–9, 11–15, 13–15, 13–15

- 2003

W Penn (3–1) 28–30, 30–16, 30–18, 30–26
L Penn State (1–3) 30–25, 31–33, 21–30, 21–30

- 2004

L Ohio (0–3) 22–30, 26–30, 12–30

- 2016

W Dayton (3–1) 20–25, 25–19, 27–25, 25–19
L Penn State (1–3) 25–20, 16–25, 13–25, 18–25

- 2017

W VCU (3–1) 25–14, 25–20, 18–25, 25–13
L Penn State (1–3) 20–25, 25–23, 22–25, 19–25

- 2018

W Iona (3–0) 26–24, 25–18, 25-15
L Michigan (2–3) 25–19, 22–25, 17–25, 25–21, 9-15

- 2019

W Howard (3–0) 25–9, 25–21, 25–14
L Cincinnati (2–3) 26–24, 21–25, 25–16, 21–25, 13–15

- 2020

W Long Island University (3–0) 26–24, 25–11, 25–10
W Utah (3–0) 25–16, 25–18, 25–19
W Minnesota (3-2) 21-25, 25-23, 20-25, 25-21, 15-11
L Washington (2-3) 25-20, 25-21, 16-25, 24-26, 9-15

- 2021

W UMBC (3-0) 25-23, 25-13, 25-18
W Penn State (3-1) 25-22, 23-25, 25-22, 25-23
W Kansas (3-0) 25-19, 25-21, 25-18
W Purdue (3-1) 25-20, 28-30, 25-20, 25-15
L Nebraska (1-3) 25-16, 17-25, 20-25, 22-25

- 2022

W Colgate (3-0) 25-16, 25-14, 25-14
W BYU (3-0) 25-21, 25-22, 25-18
W Florida (3-1) 25-20, 25-21, 17-25, 25-22
W Wisconsin (3-2) 23-25, 25-21, 25-21, 19-25, 15-13
L Louisville (2-3) 18-25, 25-23, 22-25, 25-22, 2-15

- 2023

W Coppin State (3-0) 25-18, 25-14, 25-9
W USC (3-1) 23-25, 25-20, 25-18, 25-18
W Washington State (3-0) 25-20, 25-13, 25-16
W Louisville (3-2) 23-25, 20-25, 25-16, 25-19, 15-7
L Nebraska (0-3) 20-25, 23-25, 17-25

- 2024

W Morehead State (3-0) 25-17, 25-15, 25-15
W Oklahoma (3-0) 28-26, 25-21, 25-19
W Oregon (3-2) 25-19, 24-26, 25-16, 21-25, 15-12
W Kentucky (3-0) 25-22, 25-23, 25-17
L Louisville (1-3) 25-21, 23-25, 27-29, 17-25

- 2025

W UMBC (3-0) 25-10, 25-17, 25-13
W Michigan (3-0) 25-23, 25-23, 25-18
W Minnesota (3-0) 25-16, 25-23, 25-22
W Purdue (3-1) 25-22, 25-21, 22-24, 25-17
L Texas A&M (0-3) 27-29, 21-25, 20-25

==== NIVC ====
The National Invitational Volleyball Championship (NIVC) was founded in 1989 as the Women's Invitational Volleyball Championship (WIVC). The post-season tournament existed for seven seasons from 1989 to 1995. Pitt participated in the post-season tournament in two seasons, finishing in third place in 1989.

- 1989 WIVC (3–1, 3rd place)

W UAB (3–0), W Iowa State (3–0), W Texas Tech (3–1), L Wisconsin (0–3)

- 1995 NIVC (0–4)

L Fresno State (1–3), L Wisconsin (0–3), L Saint Louis (2–3), L Stephen F. Austin (0–3)

=== Big East Championships ===
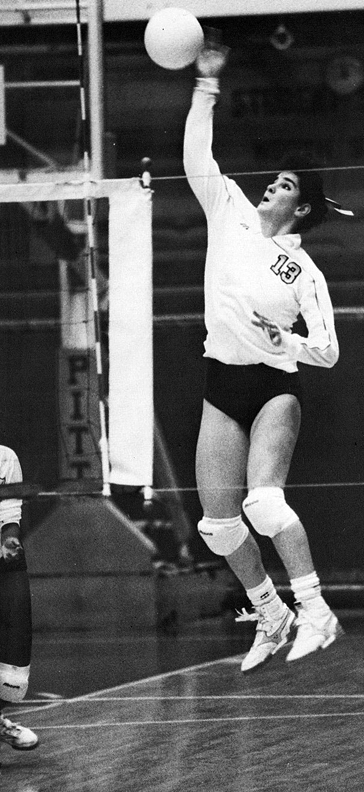
Denise Frawley was a two-time Honorable Mention All-American, 1987 Big East Conference Player of the Year, and 1988 Big East Tournament MVP for Pitt.

While a member of the Big East Conference between 1982 and 2012, Pitt won more Big East tournament championships (11) than any other school, winning seven straight from 1988 to 1994. Additionally, Pitt has been the Big East tournament runner-up five times. The Big East Conference began holding conference tournaments to crown a champion in 1982, but did not conduct round-robin play and crown a regular season champion until 1990. Prior to 1990, the Big East schools were organized into divisions and sometimes held regular-season divisional tournaments.

==== Big East Championship Tournament ====
Big East tournament champions (11)

- 1982
- 1984
- 1986

- 1988
- 1989
- 1990

- 1991
- 1992
- 1993

- 1994
- 2003

Big East Tournament runner-up (5)

- 1983
- 1985

- 1995
- 1996

- 2004

==== Big East regular season ====
The Big East did not begin sponsoring regular season conference play and regular season standings until 1990. Since that time, Pitt had won six regular season Big East Championships and finished second four times.

Big East regular season champions (6)

- 1990
- 1991

- 1992 (tie)
- 1993

- 1994 (tie)
- 2003 (tie)

Big East regular season runner-Up (4)

- 1995
- 1996

- 2004 (tie)
- 2009 (tie)

==== Big East Southern Division Tournament ====
In some years, prior to the establishment of round-robin conference play and standings in 1990, the Big East held regular season division tournaments. In the three years that Pitt participated in the Big East Southern Division Tournament, it did not lose a match and lost only one set to claim three Big East Southern Division Tournament titles.

Big East Southern Division tournament champions (3)

- 1982 (3–0)

- 1983 (3–0)

- 1984 (6–0)

=== ACC Championships ===
Pitt became a member of the Atlantic Coast Conference (ACC) in 2013, and won its first ACC championship in 2017 and subsequent conference championships in 2018 and 2019. The ACC recognizes the regular season champion as the conference champion, and has not held a conference championship tournament since Pitt joined the conference.

- 2017 (tie)
- 2018
- 2019
- 2022 (tie)
- 2023 (tie)
- 2024
- 2025 (tie)

=== Final poll ranking history ===
The AVCA released its first poll in 1982.

Years →	'90	'18	'19	'20	'21	'22	'23	'24	'25	'26
Final rank→	18	14	11	8	4	4	4	3	4	

== All-time series records ==
Atlantic Coast Conference opponents
Opponent	Overall	Home	Away	Neutral
Boston College	40–1	21–0	12–1	7–0
Cal	3–0	1–0	1–0	1–0
Clemson	15–1	7–0	8–0	0–1
Duke	17–8	5–4	7–3	5–1
Florida State	15–6	8–1	7–3	0–2
Georgia Tech	19–2	9–1	10–0	0–1
Louisville	20–21	14–7	6–9	0–5
Miami	16–5	8–1	7–3	1–1
North Carolina	18–6	8–1	6–4	4–1
NC State	17–2	9–1	7–1	1–0
Notre Dame	21–25	9–8	11–11	1–6
SMU	3–1	2–0	1–1	0–0
Stanford	1–5	1–1	0–1	0–3
Syracuse	48–13	20–4	17–7	10–2
Virginia	20–3	9–2	8–1	3–0
Virginia Tech	17–6	9–2	7–4	1–0
Wake Forest	14–1	7–0	6–1	1–0
Through December 13, 2025

== Individual awards and honors ==
=== National awards ===
- AVCA All-Americans

1993 Ann Marie Lucanie, Second-team
2003 Wendy Hatlestad, Third-team
2009 Megan Dooley, Third-team
2018 Nika Markovic, Third-team
2019 Kayla Lund, Second-team
2020 Kayla Lund, Second-team
2020 Chinaza Ndee, Second-team
2021 Kayla Lund, First-team
2021 Leketor Member-Meneh, Second-team
2021 Chinaza Ndee, Third-team
2022 Courtney Buzzerio, First-team
2022 Serena Gray, First-team
2022 Valeria Vázquez Gomez, Second-team
2022 Rachel Fairbanks, Third-team
2023 Olivia Babcock, First-team
2023 Rachel Fairbanks, First-team
2023 Torrey Stafford, Third-team
2024 Olivia Babcock, First-team
2024 Rachel Fairbanks, First-team
2024 Torrey Stafford, First-team
2024 Bre Kelley, Second-team
2025 Olivia Babcock, First-team
2025 Brooke Mosher, Second-team

- Honorable Mentions

1984 Ulana Kohutiak, Volleyball Monthly
1987 Denise Frawley, Volleyball Monthly
1988 Denise Frawley, Volleyball Monthly
1990 Jenelle Lantagne, Asics
1993 Ann Marie Lucanie, Asics
2003 Megan Miller, AVCA
2004 Megan Miller, AVCA
2004 Gini Ullery, AVCA
2004 Megan McGrane, AVCA
2005 Megan McGrane, AVCA
2006 Diana Andreyko, AVCA
2009 Michelle Rossi, AVCA
2011 Kiesha Leggs, AVCA
2014 Amanda Orchard, AVCA
2015 Amanda Orchard, AVCA
2015 Kadi Kullerkann, AVCA
2016 Jenna Potts, AVCA
2016 Stephanie Williams, AVCA
2017 Nika Markovic, AVCA
2017 Stephanie Williams, AVCA
2018 Kayla Lund, AVCA
2018 Layne Van Buskirk, AVCA
2018 Stephanie Williams, AVCA

2019 Chinaza Ndee, AVCA
2019 Layne Van Buskirk, AVCA
2020 Chiamaka Nwokolo, AVCA
2021 Chinaza Ndee, AVCA
2023 Emmy Klika, AVCA
2023 Emma Monks, AVCA
2025 Bre Kelley, AVCA

- AVCA Freshman of the Year

2023 Olivia Babcock, AVCA

- AVCA Player of the Year

2024 Olivia Babcock, AVCA
2025 Olivia Babcock, AVCA

- AVCA Coach of the Year

2024 Dan Fisher, AVCA

- AVCA Opposite of the Year

2025 Olivia Babcock, AVCA

- Honda Sports Award

2024 Olivia Babcock, Volleyball
2025 Olivia Babcock, Volleyball

=== Academic All-Americans ===
1983 Judy Young, CoSIDA
1985 Judy Young, CoSIDA
1987 Noreen Coughlin
2009 Meagan Dooley, ESPN the Magazine First Team & CoSIDA
2023 Rachel Fairbanks, College Sports Communicators Second Team
2024 Rachel Fairbanks, College Sports Communicators Second Team

=== Conference awards ===
- Player of the Year/Regular Season MVP

1985 Sue Hoover (Big East South Division)
1986 Sue Hoover (Big East South Division)
1987 Denise Frawley (Big East South Division)
1990 Jenelle Lantagne (Big East)
1991 Ann Marie Lucanie (Big East)
1992 Ann Marie Lucanie (Big East)
1993 Ann Marie Lucanie (Big East)
2003 Wendy Hatlestad (Big East)
2004 Megan Miller (Big East)
2009 Meagan Dooley (Big East)
2019 Kayla Lund (ACC)
2020 Kayla Lund (ACC)
2024 Olivia Babcock (ACC)
2025 Olivia Babcock (ACC)

- Big East Tournament MOP

1982 Julie Gaul
1984 Ulana Kohutiak
1986 Lisa Stewart
1988 Denise Frawley
1989 Jenelle Lantagne
1990 Ann Marie Lucanie
1991 Ann Marie Lucanie
1992 Ann Marie Lucanie
1993 Ann Marie Lucanie
1994 Carrie Thornton
2003 Megan Miller

- Libero of the Year

2003 Megan McGrane (Big East)
2005 Megan McGrane (Big East)
2009 Michelle Rossi (Big East)

- Setter of the Year

2016 Kamalani Akeo (ACC)
2023 Rachel Fairbanks (ACC)

- Rookie of the Year

1987 Jenelle Lantagne (Big East)
1990 Anne Marie Lucanie (Big East)
2004 Diana Andreyko (Big East)

- Freshman of the Year

2023 Olivia Babcock (ACC)

- Coach of the Year

1987 Shelton Collier (Big East)
1990 Sue Woodstra (Big East)
2003 Chris Beerman (Big East)
2017 Dan Fisher (ACC)
2018 Dan Fisher (ACC)
2024 Dan Fisher (ACC)

- Defensive Player of the Year

2025 Bre Kelly (ACC)

- Female Scholar-Athlete of the Year (across all sports)

1987–88 Noreen Coughlin (Big East)
2009–10 Meagan Dooley (Big East)

== Pitt Volleyball season-by-season results ==
Record table
Season	Coach	Overall	Conference	Standing	Postseason
Mary Kromer (1974–1975)
1974	Mary Kromer	14–3	—	—	EAIAW Regional Tournament (quarterfinals)
1975	Mary Kromer	18–2	—	—	EAIAW Regional Tournament
Mary Kromer:		32–5 (.865)	-		
Mike Hebert (1976–1979)
1976	Mike Hebert	26–6	—	—	EAIAW Regional Tournament (4th)
1977	Mike Hebert	27–13	—	—	EAIAW Regional Tournament (4th)
1978	Mike Hebert	40–12	—	—	EAIAW Regional Champions; AIAW National Championships (13th)
1979	Mike Hebert	34–22–3	—	—	EAIAW Regional Champions; AIAW National Championships
Mike Hebert:		127–53–3 (.702)	-		
Shelton Collier (Big East Conference beginning in 1982) (1980–1988)
1980	Shelton Collier	41–14	—	—	EAIAW Regional Tournament (3rd)
1981	Shelton Collier	37–15	—	—	EAIAW Regional Champions; AIAW National Championships (9th)
1982	Shelton Collier	41–7	—	—	Big East tournament champions NCAA first round
1983	Shelton Collier	31–11	—	—	Big East Tournament runner-up
1984	Shelton Collier	30–8	—	—	Big East tournament champions NCAA first round
1985	Shelton Collier	26–11	—	—	Big East Tournament runner-up
1986	Shelton Collier	27–13	—	—	Big East tournament champions NCAA first round
1987	Shelton Collier	37–6	—	—	Big East Tournament; NCAA first round
1988	Shelton Collier	24–9	—	—	Big East tournament champions
Shelton Collier:		294–94 (.758)	-		
Sue Woodstra (Big East Conference) (1989–1992)
1989	Sue Woodstra	32–10	—	—	Big East tournament champions Women's Invitational Volleyball Championship (3rd)
1990	Sue Woodstra	32–6	7–0	1st	Big East tournament champions NCAA regional semifinal
1991	Sue Woodstra	28–9	7–0	1st	Big East tournament champions NCAA first round
1992	Sue Woodstra	18–14	5–2	T-1st	Big East tournament champions NCAA first round
Sue Woodstra:		110–39 (.738)	19–2 (.905)		
Cindy Alvear (Big East Conference) (1993–1999)
1993	Cindy Alvear	23–10	7–0	1st	Big East tournament champions NCAA first round
1994	Cindy Alvear	21–11	7–1	T-1st	Big East tournament champions NCAA second round
1995	Cindy Alvear	19–15	10–1	2nd	Big East Tournament runner-up National Invitational Volleyball Championship
1996	Cindy Alvear	22–11	9–2	2nd	Big East Tournament runner-up
1997	Cindy Alvear	15–13	6–5	T-4th	Big East Tournament
1998	Cindy Alvear	16–14	5–6	T-6th	Big East Tournament
1999	Cindy Alvear	12–10	4–7	T-7th	—
Cindy Alvear:		128–84 (.604)	48–22 (.686)		
Chris Beerman (Big East Conference) (2000–2007)
2000	Chris Beerman	22–10	8–3	3rd	Big East Tournament
2001	Chris Beerman	11–16	7–5	5th	—
2002	Chris Beerman	20–9	9–4	T-4th	—
2003	Chris Beerman	26–6	11–1	T-1st	Big East tournament champions NCAA second round
2004	Chris Beerman	21–11	8–2	T-2nd	Big East Tournament runner-up NCAA first round
2005	Chris Beerman	17–13	9–5	T-4th	Big East Tournament
2006	Chris Beerman	22–9	10–4	T-3rd	Big East Tournament
2007	Chris Beerman	15–16	8–6	T-6th	—
Chris Beerman:		154–90 (.631)	70–30 (.700)		
Toby Rens (Big East Conference) (2008–2012)
2008	Toby Rens	17–14	8–6	T-6th	Big East Tournament
2009	Toby Rens	20–11	12–2	T-2nd	Big East Tournament
2010	Toby Rens	13–18	7–7	T-6th	Big East Tournament
2011	Toby Rens	18–15	7–7	T-8th	Big East Tournament
2012	Toby Rens	17–14	7–8	T-6th	Big East Tournament
Toby Rens:		85–72 (.541)	41–30 (.577)		
Dan Fisher (Atlantic Coast Conference) (2013–present)
2013	Dan Fisher	19–14	11–9	T-5th	
2014	Dan Fisher	25–6	13–5	5th	
2015	Dan Fisher	23–9	13–7	6th	
2016	Dan Fisher	25–9	15–5	T-4th	NCAA second round
2017	Dan Fisher	26–7	18–2	T-1st	NCAA second round
2018	Dan Fisher	30–2	17–1	1st	NCAA second round
2019	Dan Fisher	30–2	18–0	1st	NCAA second round
2020	Dan Fisher	19–5	14–4	3rd	NCAA Elite Eight
2021	Dan Fisher	30-4	15-3	T-2nd	NCAA Final Four
2022	Dan Fisher	31-3	17-1	T-1st	NCAA Final Four
2023	Dan Fisher	29-5	16-2	T-1st	NCAA Final Four
2024	Dan Fisher	33-2	19-1	1st	NCAA Final Four
2025	Dan Fisher	30-5	18-2	T-1st	NCAA Final Four
Dan Fisher:		350–73 (.827)	204–42 (.829)		
Total:		1280-510-3 (.715)	382–126 (.752)		
National champion Postseason invitational champion Conference regular season champion Conference regular season and conference tournament champion Division regular season champion Division regular season and conference tournament champion Conference tournament champion

== See also ==
- List of NCAA Division I women's volleyball programs
