= Prominent women's sports leagues in the United States and Canada =

The prominent women's sports leagues in the United States and Canada serve as the pinnacle of women's athletic competition in North America. The U.S. is home to the majority of professional women's leagues. In North America, the top women's leagues feature both team sports and individual athletes. While some leagues have paid professional female athletes, others do not and function at a semi-professional level.

The team sports of soccer (also known as association football), basketball, fastpitch softball, ice hockey, ringette, women's gridiron football (full contact), flat track roller derby, and lacrosse are among the top leagues for women in North America. Women's competitions are also popular in individual sports such as tennis, bowling, and golf.

In 2025, according to a poll by the Associated Press-NORC Center for Public Affairs Research, about 3 in 10 American adults followed women’s professional or college sports. According to another report, 60% of Canadians say perception of women's sports has improved, 41% of Canadians see women's sports as a national investment, and 80% of men consider themselves fans of women's sports. Record attendances recorded by women's professional sports leagues have been dominated by the National Women's Soccer League (NWSL), Women's National Basketball Association (WNBA), and the now defunct National Pro Fastpitch (NPF), Independent Women's Football League (IWFL), Women's Professional Soccer (WPS), and National Women's Hockey League (NWHL).

== Business ==
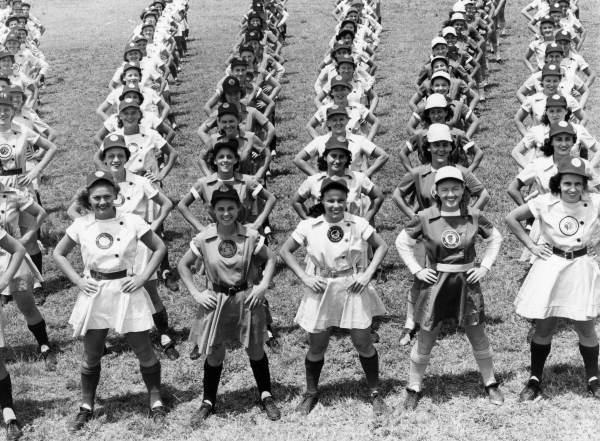
All-American Girls Professional Baseball League members performing calisthenics in Opa-locka, Florida, on April 22, 1948. The different baseball clubs are (L-R): Fort Wayne Daisies (partially visible), Chicago Colleens, Rockford Peaches, South Bend Blue Sox, Springfield Sallies and Peoria Redwings.

Some women's leagues are professional, while others are semi-professional. Only a few professional women's leagues pay their players, such as the Women's National Basketball Association (WNBA), National Women's Soccer League (NWSL), and Professional Women's Hockey League (PWHL), all of which exist in the U.S. Many of the professional leagues pay less than a livable wage, while also offering other incentives in order to claim professional status.

The annual average salary in the now defunct Women's Professional Soccer (WPS) was $32,000 in 2009. Players' salaries would vary (i.e., Marta Vieira da Silva would have received a salary of $400,000 during the last three seasons 2009–2011). As of 2026, the NWSL has a $3.7 million team salary cap, and under the "High Impact Player" rule announced in 2025, NWSL player salary caps can exceed the team cap by up to $1M for specific, elite players.

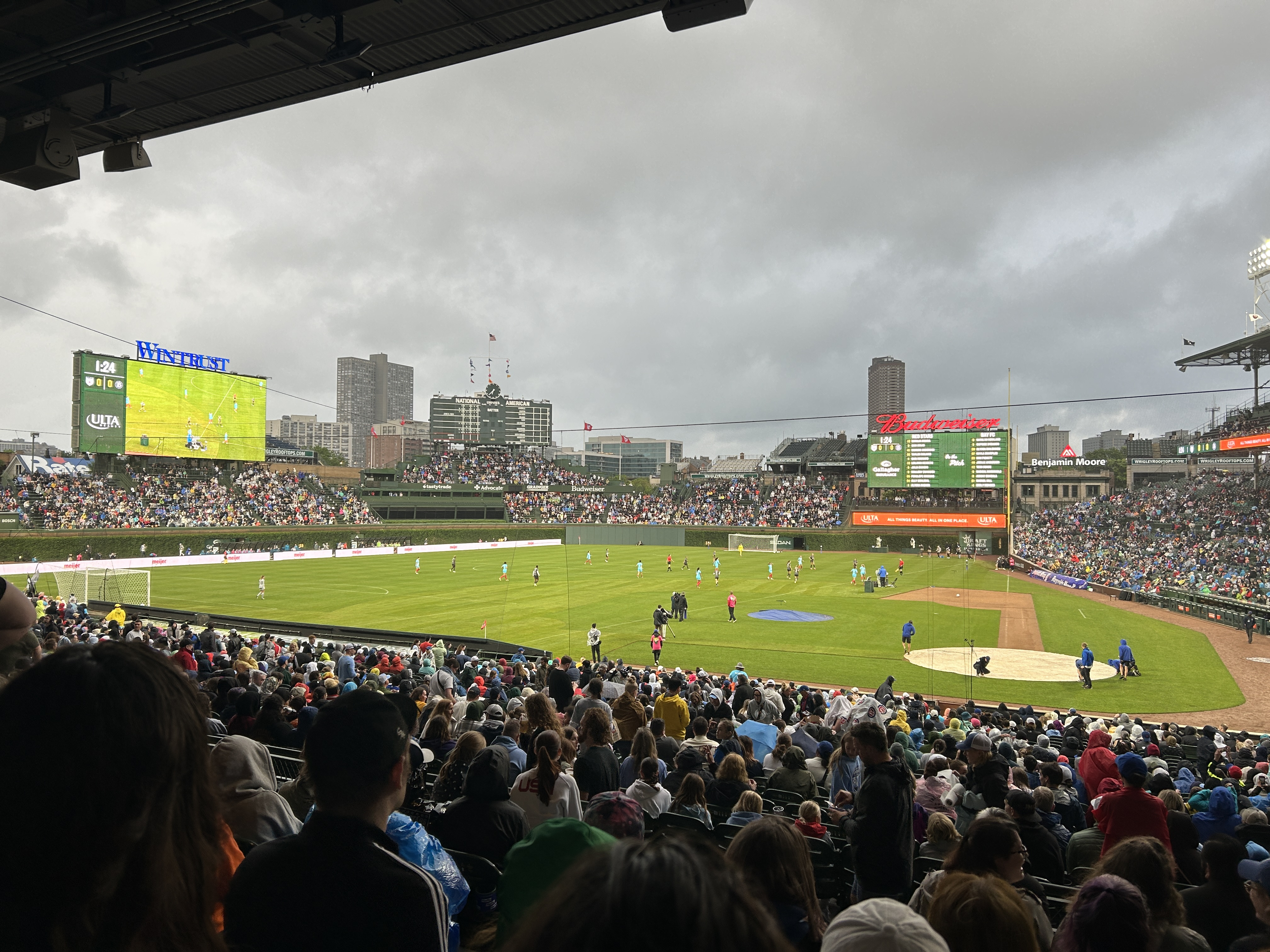
A Chicago Red Stars and Bay FC match at Wrigley Field set a single-game attendance record of 35,038.

With the approval of the most recent WNBA's collective bargaining agreement (CBA) in 2026, players' salaries range from a minimum of $270,000 to $1.4M, with each team's cap at $7M (compared to $1.5M in 2025).

The Premier Hockey Federation (PHF) was established in 2015 to be the first professional women's ice hockey league to pay players a salary. In 2015, the salaries started at a minimum of $10,000 per season; however, salaries were reduced up to 50% in 2016. The Canadian Women's Hockey League (CWHL) began as a professional league in name only, giving other benefits to its players, but started paying stipends in 2017 with a minimum of $2,000 and up to $10,000 per season financed by the league's addition of teams in China. However, the CWHL ceased operations in 2019 citing the professional status to be financially infeasible. The PHF itself disbanded after its 2022–23 season; it was purchased by a group led by investor Mark Walter and tennis great Billie Jean King, which announced the establishment of the new PWHL. For the 2025–26 PWHL season, players had a minimum salary of $37,131, up from $35,000 in 2024. Each year, the minimum base salary will increase by 3%.

=== Player development ===
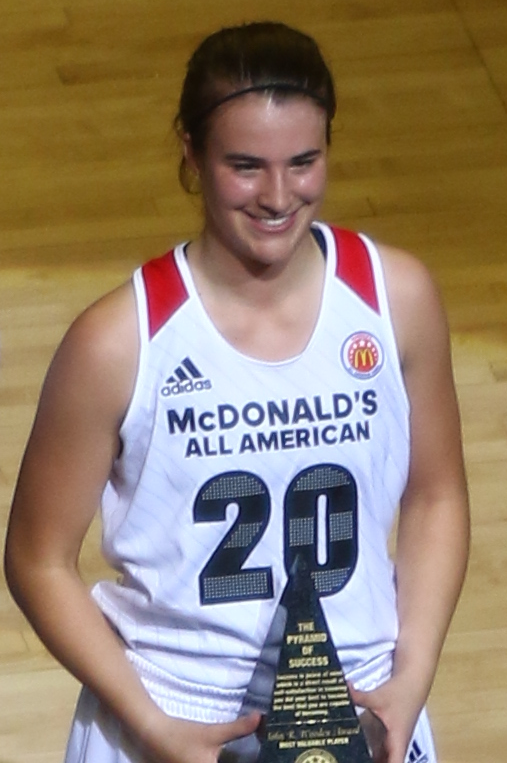
Sabrina Ionescu as MVP of the 2016 McDonald's All-American Game.

Generally, all major sports leagues possess an amateur system for the development of young players. Certain women's leagues develop links privileged with minor league amateurs of lower and junior levels. With the growth of women's sports at the NCAA and Canada's U Sports levels in the last decades, athletes can choose a university education (along with competing at the university level), and then have the potential proceed to compete in a top-level major league.

Players who have represented their national teams at junior or senior levels can showcase their talent on an international stage. Success in international competitions like the World Cup or Olympics can elevate a player's profile and indicate their ability to perform under pressure. Statistical achievements, such as leading the league in scoring, assists, or other categories, and receiving awards like MVP (Most Valuable Player), Rookie of the Year, or All-Star selections, highlight a player's individual skill and contribution to their team.

=== Television broadcasting ===
As of December 2021, the Women's National Basketball Association, National Women's Soccer League, (Note: Fox Sports broadcast the league's inaugural season, while ESPN did it in 2014. Both were one-year contracts. The league's current broadcast contract with A&E Networks, effective in 2017, calls for one weekly Saturday afternoon broadcast on A&E's Lifetime channel.) National Pro Fastpitch (which folded in 2001), Premier Hockey Federation (which folded in 2023), and Women's Flat Track Derby Association had television broadcasting contracts. The Canadian Women's Hockey League had a TV contract before it folded after its 2018–19 season.

The WNBA has been steadily growing in popularity and viewership, with several major networks. The league has been actively advancing women's basketball and promoting its athletes. The NWSL has also seen increased visibility through its broadcasting agreements with networks. This has helped bring women's soccer to a wider audience.

== Professional women's leagues ==
There are several professional women's sports leagues in North America where female athletes are paid to play a sport, though most exist in the United States. Women's professional sports leagues in North America include the following.

=== Team sports ===
Sport	Country	Pro league	Began play	Teams	Avg. attendance
Baseball	US	Women’s Pro Baseball League (WPBL)	2026	4	
Basketball	CAN; US	Women's National Basketball Association (WNBA)	1997	15 (Note: The WNBA will expand to 16 teams in 2028, 17 in 2029, and 18 in 2030.)	11,148 (2025)
Basketball	CAN; US	Unrivaled	2025	8	
Ice hockey	CAN; US	Professional Women's Hockey League (PWHL)	2024	12	9,297 (2025–26)
Lacrosse	US	Women's Lacrosse League (WLL)	2025	4	
Soccer	US	National Women's Soccer League (NWSL)	2013	16 (Note: The NWSL will expand to 18 teams in 2028.)	11,235 (2024)
Soccer	US	USL Super League (USLS)	2024	9 (Note: USLS plans to expand to at least 11 teams in 2026–27. Seven other future teams have been announced, but with no fixed entry date.)	2,750 (2025–26)
Soccer	CAN	Northern Super League (NSL)	2025	6	3,236 (2026–27)
Softball	US	Athletes Unlimited Softball League (AUSL)	2025	6	
Volleyball	US	Major League Volleyball (MLV)	2024	8	4,000 (history)
Volleyball	US	League One Volleyball (LOVB)	2025	6	4,608 (2024)

==== Teams by urban area ====
Urban area	Country	Pop. rank	Population (2025 est.)	Basketball	Hockey	Soccer			Volleyball		Softball
Urban area	Country	Pop. rank	Population (2025 est.)	WNBA	PWHL	NWSL	USLS	NSL	LOVB Pro	MLV	AUSL
New York City	United States	1	20,892,000	New York Liberty	New York Sirens	Gotham FC	Brooklyn FC	—	—	—	—
New York City	United States	1	20,892,000	New York Liberty	New York Sirens	Gotham FC	New York Cosmos (2026)	—	—	—	—
Los Angeles	United States	2	15,582,000	Los Angeles Sparks	—	Angel City FC	—	—	Los Angeles Orbit (2027)	Los Angeles Thunder (2027)	—
Chicago	United States	3	8,790,000	Chicago Sky	—	Chicago Stars FC	—	—	—	—	Chicago Bandits
Washington–Baltimore	United States	4	7,636,000	Washington Mystics	—	Washington Spirit	DC Power FC	—	—	DC Flight (2027)	—
Boston	United States	5	7,375,000	—	Boston Fleet	Boston Legacy FC	—	—	—	—	—
Dallas–Fort Worth	United States	6	6,980,000	Dallas Wings	—	—	Dallas Trinity FC	—	—	Dallas Pulse	—
Houston	United States	7	6,804,000	(Note: The original Houston Comets played in the WNBA from 1997 to 2008 before disbanding. The Comets name will be revived in 2027 when the Connecticut Sun relocates to Houston.)	—	Houston Dash	—	—	LOVB Houston	—	—
Toronto	Canada	8	6,400,000	Toronto Tempo	Toronto Sceptres	—	—	AFC Toronto	—	—	—
Toronto	Canada	8	6,400,000	Toronto Tempo	Hamilton Havoc (2026–27)	—	—	AFC Toronto	—	—	—
San Francisco Bay Area	United States	9	6,376,000	Golden State Valkyries	San Jose Sea Lions (2026–27)	Bay FC	Oakland Soul SC	—	San Francisco Signal (2027)	NorCal Rumble (2027)	—
Miami–Fort Lauderdale	United States	10	6,129,000	(Note: The Miami Sol played in the WNBA from 2000 to 2002 before disbanding.)	—	—	Fort Lauderdale United FC	—	LOVB Miami (2027)	—	—
Miami–Fort Lauderdale	United States	10	6,129,000	(Note: The Miami Sol played in the WNBA from 2000 to 2002 before disbanding.)	—	—	USL Palm Beach (Future)	—	LOVB Miami (2027)	—	—
Philadelphia	United States	11	5,697,000	Future team (2030)	—	—	—	—	—	—	—
Atlanta	United States	12	5,495,000	Atlanta Dream	—	Atlanta City FC (2028)	—	—	LOVB Atlanta	Atlanta Vibe	—
Phoenix	United States	13	4,600,000	Phoenix Mercury	—	—	—	—	—	—	—
Detroit	United States	14	4,143,000	Future team (2029) (Note: The Detroit Shock played in Detroit from 1998 to 2009 before moving twice, first to Tulsa as the Tulsa Shock and then to Dallas–Fort Worth as the Dallas Wings.)	Detroit Clutch (2026–27)	—	—	—	—	—	—
Montreal	Canada	15	4,029,000	—	Montreal Victoire	—	—	Montreal Roses FC	—	—	—
Seattle	United States	16	3,952,000	Seattle Storm	Seattle Torrent	Seattle Reign FC	—	—	—	—	—
Orlando	United States	17	3,204,000	—	—	Orlando Pride	—	—	—	Orlando Valkyries	—
Tampa Bay Area	United States	18	3,180,000	—	—	—	Tampa Bay Sun FC	—	—	—	—
San Diego	United States	19	3,053,000	—	—	San Diego Wave FC	—	—	—	(Note: The San Diego Mojo played in the MLV from 2024 to 2025 before ceasing operations.)	—
Minneapolis–Saint Paul	United States	20	2,904,000	Minnesota Lynx	Minnesota Frost	—	—	—	LOVB Minnesota (2027)	Minnesota Forge (2027)	—
Denver	United States	21	2,892,000	—	—	Denver Summit FC	—	—	—	—	—
Vancouver	Canada	22	2,833,000	—	Vancouver Goldeneyes	—	—	Vancouver Rise FC	—	—	—
Cleveland	United States	23	2,642,000	Cleveland Sirens (2028) (Note: A previous team, the Cleveland Rockers, played in the WNBA from 1997 to 2003 before disbanding. The Sirens will not assume the Rockers history.)	—	—	—	—	—	—	—
Salt Lake City	United States	24	2,455,000	(Note: The Utah Starzz moved to San Antonio following the 2002 season, becoming the San Antonio Silver Stars, rebranded as the San Antonio Stars following the 2013 season, and eventually moved to Las Vegas following the 2017 season, becoming the Las Vegas Aces.)	—	Utah Royals	—	—	LOVB Salt Lake	—	Utah Talons
Las Vegas	United States	25	2,260,000	Las Vegas Aces	Vegas Vanguards (2026–27)	—	—	—	—	Vegas Thrill (Note: The team is currently on hiatus.)	—
Columbus	United States	36	2,242,028	—	—	Future team (2028)	—	—	—	Columbus Fury	—
Charlotte	United States	27	2,214,000	(Note: The Charlotte Sting played in the WNBA from 1997 to 2006 before disbanding.)	—	—	Carolina Ascent FC	—	—	—	—
San Antonio	United States	28	2,101,000		—	—	—	—	—	—	—
Portland	United States	29	2,076,000	Portland Fire (2026) (Note: A previous team, also named the Portland Fire, played in the WNBA from 2000 to 2002 before disbanding. The current Fire does not consider the original team to be part of its history.)	—	Portland Thorns FC	—	—	—	—	Portland Cascade
Sacramento	United States	30	1,970,000	(Note: The Sacramento Monarchs played in the WNBA from 1997 to 2009 before disbanding.)	—	—	—	—	—	—	—
Austin	United States	31	1,957,000	—	—	—	—	—	LOVB Austin	—	Texas Volts
Kansas City	United States	32	1,788,000	—	—	Kansas City Current	—	—	—	—	—
Indianapolis	United States	33	1,757,000	Indiana Fever	—	—	Indy Eleven	—	—	Indy Ignite	—
Calgary	Canada	34	1,593,000	—	—	—	—	Calgary Wild FC	—	—	—
Raleigh	United States	35	1,585,000	—	—	North Carolina Courage	—	—	—	—	Carolina Blaze
Jacksonville	United States	36	1,325,000	—	—	—	Sporting Club Jacksonville	—	—	—	—
Ottawa	Canada	37	1,187,000	—	Ottawa Charge	—	—	Ottawa Rapid FC	—	—	—
Oklahoma City	United States	38	1,007,000	—	—	—	—	—	—	—	Oklahoma City Spark
Louisville	United States	39	961,000	—	—	Racing Louisville FC	—	—	—	—	—
Buffalo	United States	40	950,000	—	—	—	Buffalo Pro Soccer	—	—	—	—
Madison	United States	41	910,246	—	—	—	Rally Madison FC	—	LOVB Madison	—	—
Boise	United States	42	865,000	—	—	—	Athletic Club Boise	—	—	—	—
Omaha	United States	43	829,000	—	—	—	—	—	LOVB Nebraska	Omaha Supernovas	—
Grand Rapids	United States	44	614,000	—	—	—	—	—	—	Grand Rapids Rise	—
Spokane	United States	45	593,466	—	—	—	Spokane Zephyr FC	—	—	—	—
Northwest Arkansas	United States	46	590,337	—	—	—	Ozark United FC	—	—	—	—
Chattanooga	United States	47	574,507	—	—	—	Chattanooga Red Wolves SC	—	—	—	—
Lexington	United States	48	516,811	—	—	—	Lexington SC	—	—	—	—
Halifax	Canada	49	439,819	—	—	—	—	Halifax Tides FC	—	—	—
Uncasville	United States	50	—	Connecticut Sun (Note: The Sun has been sold to Houston Rockets owner Tilman Fertitta and will relocate to Houston in 2027, reviving the Houston Comets name.)	—	—	—	—	—	—	—

=== Individual sports ===
(*) = variable: can include singles or doubles

Sport	Country	Pro league	Began play	Players	Avg. attendance
Golf	CAN; USA	Ladies Professional Golf Association (LPGA)	1950		
Tennis	CAN; USA	Women's Tennis Association (WTA)	1973		2,500
Bowling	USA	Professional Women's Bowling Association (PWBA)	1960		

== Semi-professional women's leagues ==
=== Team sports ===
Sport	Country	Amateur league	Began play	Teams	Ref.
American football See also: Women's gridiron football	USA	Women's Football Alliance (WFA)	2009	14	
American football See also: Women's gridiron football	USA	X League	2009	8	
American football See also: Women's gridiron football	USA	Women's National Football Conference (WNFC)	2019	17	
Ringette	Canada	National Ringette League (NRL)	2004	13	
Roller derby	International	Women's Flat Track Derby Association (WFTDA)	2004		
Rugby union	USA	Women's Elite Rugby (WER)	2025	6	
Ultimate Frisbee	USA	Premier Ultimate League (PUL)	2019	10	
Ultimate Frisbee	USA	Western Ultimate League (WUL)	2020	8	

== Basketball ==
=== Early history ===
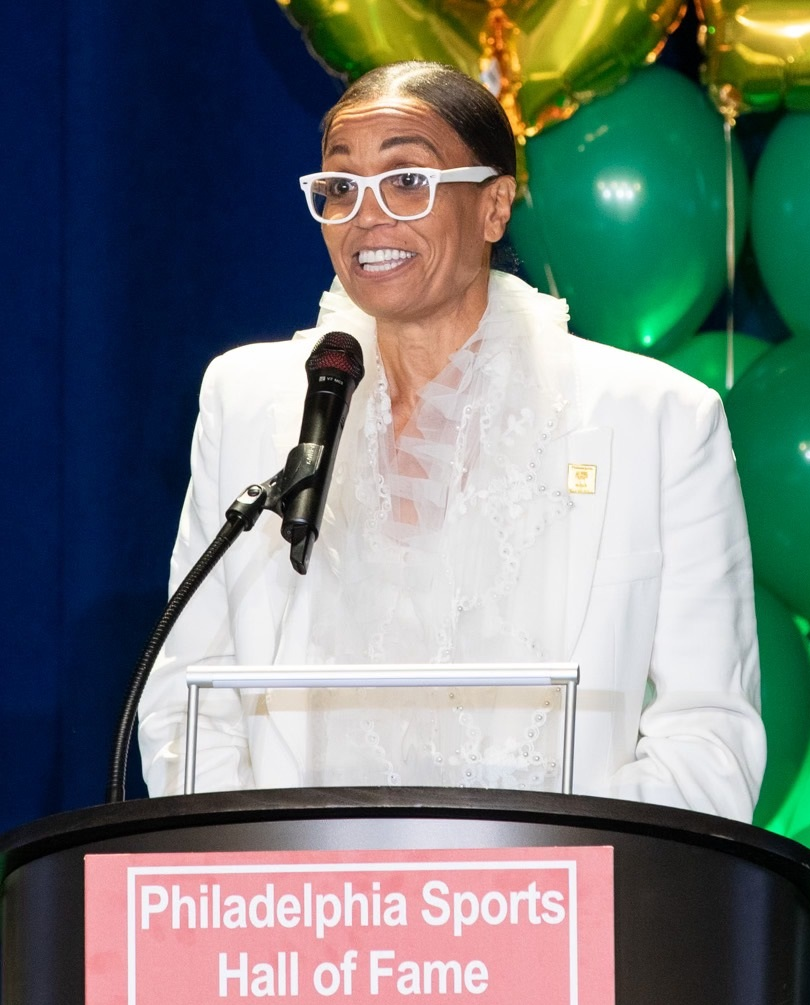
Valerie Still, a pioneering figure in women's basketball, known for her contributions to early pro leagues like the WBL and WBA.

Professional women's basketball has been played in the U.S. since 1978. The first professional league was the Women's Pro Basketball League (WBL). The league played three seasons from the fall of 1978 to the spring of 1981.

The second women's professional league to be created in the U.S. was the Women's Basketball Association (WBA). The league played three seasons (from 1993 to 1995) with plans to play as a 12-team league in 1997 but disbanded before 1997 season. In 1996, two professional women's leagues were started in the U.S.: the American Basketball League (ABL) and the WNBA. The ABL was founded in 1996 during an increase in the interest in the sport following the 1996 Summer Olympics. The league played two full seasons (1996–97 and 1997–98) and started a third (1998–99) before it folded in December 1998.

=== Women's National Basketball Association (WNBA) ===
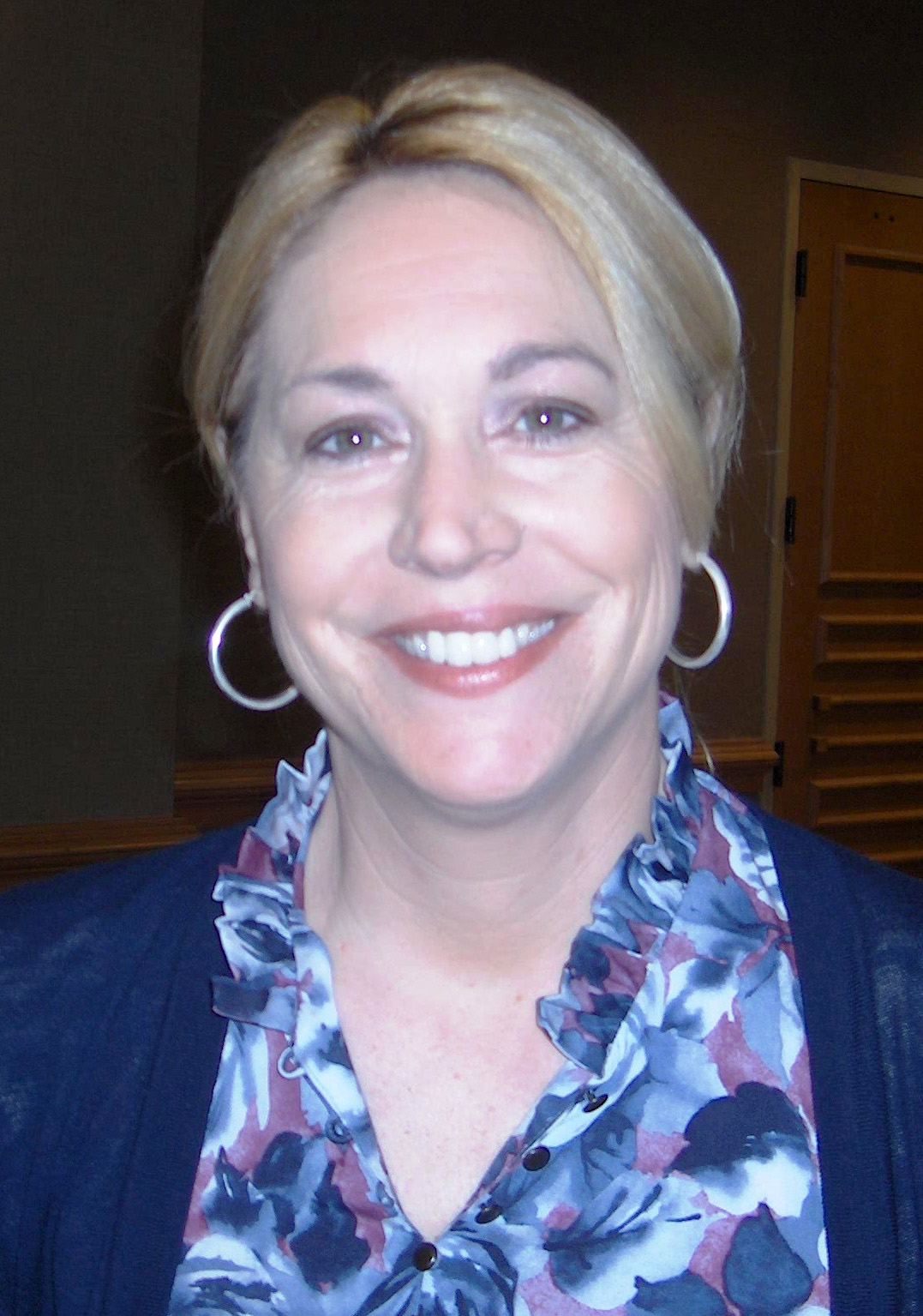
Doris Burke, a sports journalist and broadcaster known for her analysis of the NBA and WNBA.

The Women's National Basketball Association (WNBA) is the longest-running competition in women's basketball. The WNBA was formed in 1996 as the women's counterpart to the National Basketball Association, and league play began in 1997.

The WNBA regular season runs from May to September, opposite to the NBA regular season of October to April. Starting with the 2027 season, the WNBA expanded from 44 to 50 games per season. Most WNBA teams play at the same venue as their NBA counterparts and some team names are similar to those of NBA teams in the same market, including the Washington Wizards and Washington Mystics, the Minnesota Timberwolves and Minnesota Lynx, the Golden State Valkyries and Golden State Warriors, and the Phoenix Mercury and Phoenix Suns.

==== Attendance ====
The league's attendance has fluctuated over time. The inaugural 1997 season had an average regular season attendance of 9,661. The 1998, 1999, and 2000 seasons had 10,868, 10,205, and 9,079 in attendance, respectively. The 2000 WNBA All-Star Game in Phoenix attracted a crowd of 17,717 supporters. Average attendance then began dropping below 9,000 in 2003, 2004, and 2005.

In 2007, the WNBA signed a TV deal with ESPN that would run from 2009 to 2016. This deal was the first to pay rights fees to women's teams. In 2009, it had a total TV viewership of 413,000 in combined cable and broadcast television and an average attendance of 8,039.

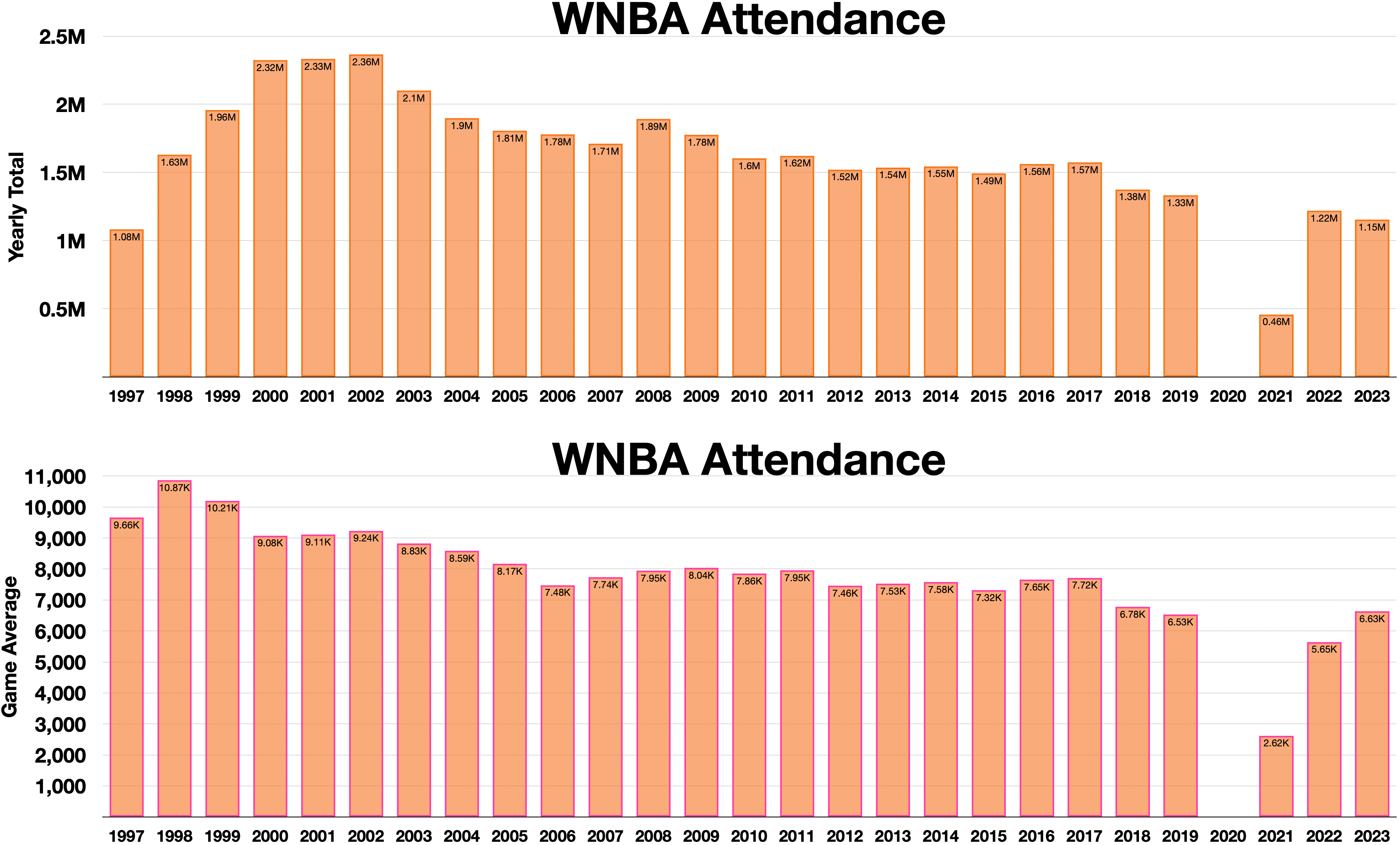
WNBA attendance 1997–2023

In 2009, of 23 million American professional basketball fans, 92.3% attended NBA games and the remaining 7.7% attended WNBA games. Mark J. Perry found from the Center for Feminist Research of University of Southern California's "Gender in Televised Sports" that in 2009 the media coverage for the NBA was 77.8% and WNBA was 22.2%.

Game 1 of the 2011 WNBA Finals took place at the Target Center in Minneapolis and attracted 15,258 supporters when the Minnesota Lynx scored an 88–74 victory over the Atlanta Dream. Game 2 of the 2011 WNBA Finals attracted 15,124 supporters. Similarly, the 2017 WNBA All-Star Game at KeyArena in Seattle had a crowd of 15,221 fans.

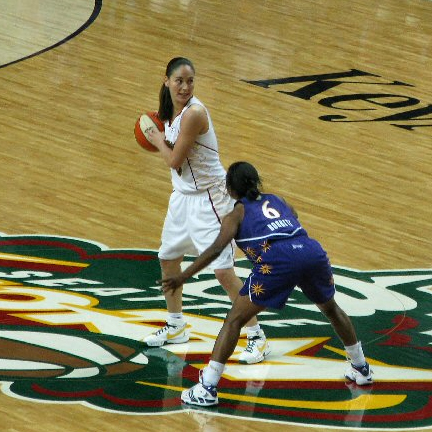
Sue Bird, a highly decorated player for the Seattle Storm, known for her leadership and clutch performances.

In 2024, the WNBA saw major increases in attendance and media interest, coinciding with the arrival of several prominent rookies, most notably Caitlin Clark. At the season's halfway point, the average league attendance was 9,311, the highest since the 1990s. Two games that featured Clark's team, the Indiana Fever, had drawn more than 20,000 fans, with only six previous games in WNBA history having drawn such numbers.

=== Unrivaled ===
On May 30, 2024, WNBA stars Napheesa Collier and Breanna Stewart announced the launch of a new league, Unrivaled, which started play in January 2025. The league's first 10-week season was played entirely in the Miami area. Unrivaled is explicitly intended to give WNBA players a domestic option for professional play during the traditional basketball season. Unlike the WNBA, Unrivaled plays in a 3-on-3 format on a compressed full court. Initially, a total of 30 players, divided into six teams, were to participate in the first season, but each team's roster was expanded to six players before the first season.

The league's business model differs radically from that of most professional leagues; participating players have the opportunity for ownership stakes in the league. The league also has several high-profile investors, among them soccer stars Alex Morgan and Megan Rapinoe, former NBA greats Carmelo Anthony and Steve Nash, former golf star Michelle Wie West, actor Ashton Kutcher, and women's basketball coach Geno Auriemma. The league planned to offer the highest average salaries of any women's professional sports league. As of 2025, Unrivaled paid salaries around $220,000 per player.

Unrivaled initially planned to stay at six teams for its second season in 2026 and expand to eight teams in 2027. However, having surpassed its original financial goals in its first season, and also having received further outside investment, the league moved its expansion plans up to the 2026 season.

== Football ==
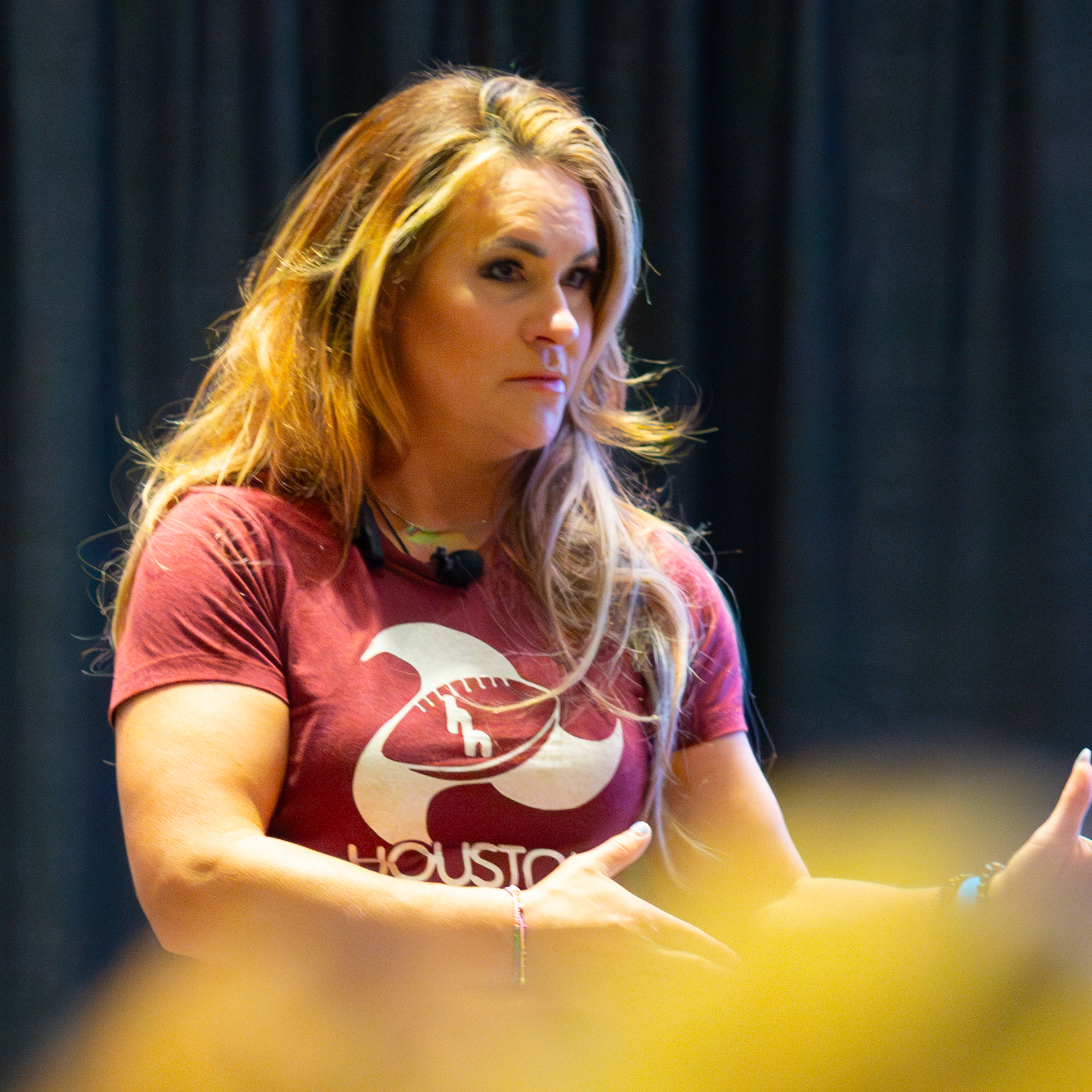
Jennifer Welter is a pioneering figure in women's football, particularly in the realm of tackle football.

In North America, women's gridiron football is commonly known by different names, including "women's tackle football", "women's American football", "women's Canadian football", or simply "women's football". The term "football" in North American sport differs from the European use of the word, which refers to a sport North Americans know as soccer. Women's gridiron football in North America has been gaining popularity and recognition over the years. Leagues such as the Women's Football Alliance (WFA) and the now defunct Independent Women's Football League (IWFL) have provided platforms for women to compete in tackle football at various levels of competition.

=== Women's National Football Conference (WNFC) ===
The Women's National Football Conference (WNFC) is an amateur full-contact women's American football league in the U.S. It was founded in 2018 with its inaugural season in 2019. The WNFC does not charge teams of players a fee for entry into the league; rather, teams are invited into the league based on quality of market, teams, players and ownership. The WNFC does not pay players salaries, but as of mid-2025, it planned to give $20,000 to the championship team and had budgeted to pay weekly and season award-winners.

In late-2018, the WNFC announced a partnership with Adidas, as part of the latter's "She Breaks Barriers" initiative. As such, Adidas serves as the WNFC's presenting sponsor, with all WNFC teams wearing custom Adidas uniforms. In 2025, the partnership was extended through 2028.

WNFC games first streamed only on the WNFC's website, and then on streaming platform Vyre Network. In 2021, 21,312 users watched the championship game, followed by 77,546 users in 2022. In 2025, the WNFC championship game was on ESPN2 for the first time. In 2026, it was announced that the WNFC's contract with ESPN had been extended.

== Ice hockey ==
=== Professional Women's Hockey League ===
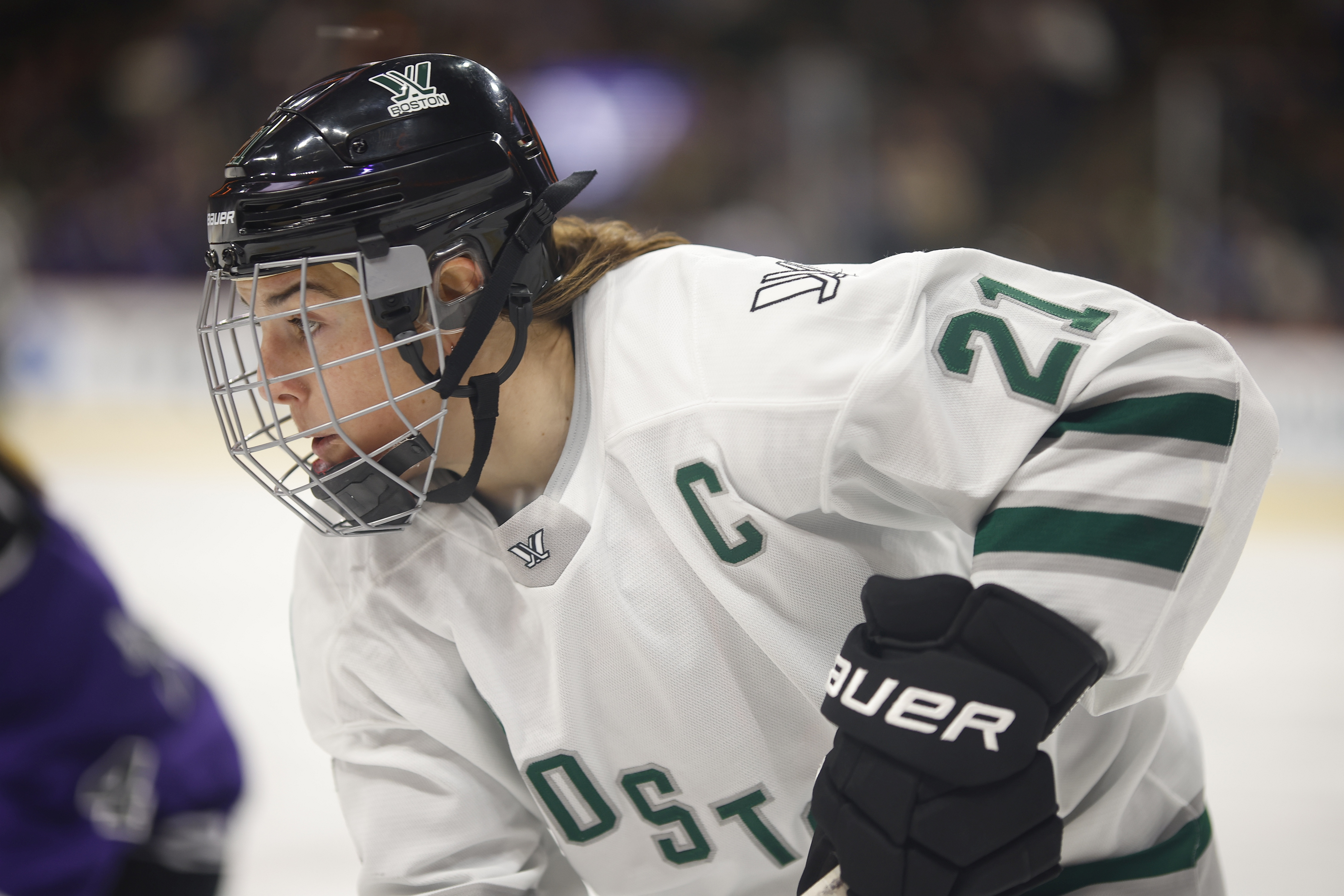
Hilary Knight ice hockey forward known for her scoring and leadership, representing Team USA and playing a prominent role in women's professional hockey leagues.

The Professional Women's Hockey League (PWHL) was founded in 2023, after a group led by Mark Walter and Billie Jean King bought the intellectual property of the Premier Hockey Federation (PHF). They partnered with the Professional Women's Hockey Players Association (PWHPA), originally established as an advocacy organization for women's professional hockey. The new owners shuttered the PHF, and the new league's name was announced that August. The first PWHL season in 2024 featured six league-owned teams, three each in Canada and the U.S. Its first year had an average attendance of 5,448 fans. The league added two more teams for the 2025–26 season, one in each country. The second season averaged 9,297 fans per game. In mid-2026, the PWHL announced it would add four more teams for the 2026–27 season.

=== Premier Hockey Federation ===
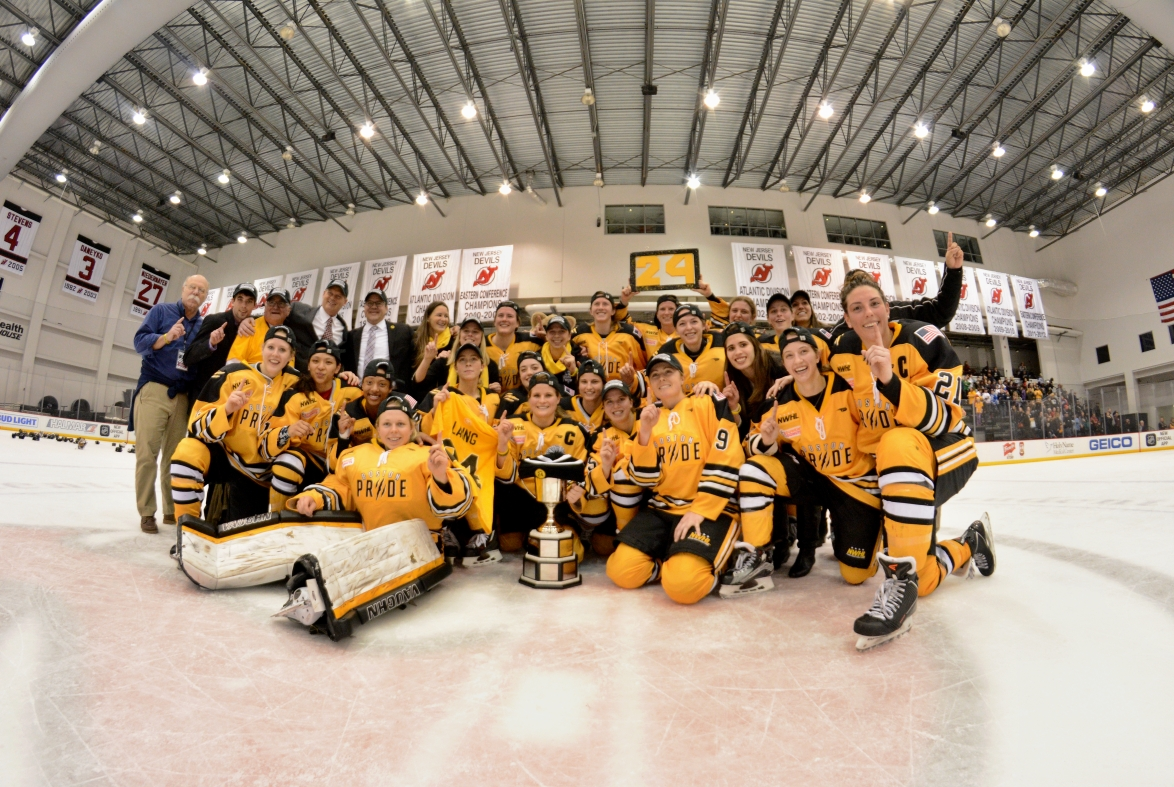
The Boston Pride celebrating their first Isobel Cup win in 2016.

In 2015, the Premier Hockey Federation (PHF) was established as the "National Women's Hockey League" (NWHL) with the purpose of being the first professional women's ice hockey league in North America that paid its players.

The league launched its inaugural 2015–16 season with four teams in the Northeastern U.S.: the Boston Pride, Buffalo Beauts, Connecticut Whale, and New York Riveters, with all franchises owned by the league. The league initially had a $10,000 minimum salary per season for players; however, players' salaries were reduced up to 50% part-way through the second season.

In October 2017, NWHL teams began partnering with established National Hockey League (NHL) teams via a branding agreement between the New York Riveters and the New Jersey Devils. In December 2017, the Buffalo Beauts' franchise was purchased by the NHL's Buffalo Sabres ownership, Pegula Sports and Entertainment, and became the first NWHL franchise to not be owned by the league. The NWHL expanded for the first time in 2018, when the Minnesota Whitecaps—a former member of the Western Women's Hockey League (WWHL) that had been operating independently since 2011—joined the league. The league added the Toronto Six prior to its 2020–21 season, and renamed itself as the Premier Hockey Federation after that season. A second Canadian team, the Montreal Force, started play in 2022–23.

The 2022–23 season was the last for the PHF, as it would be purchased, shut down, and replaced by the PWHL.

== Soccer ==
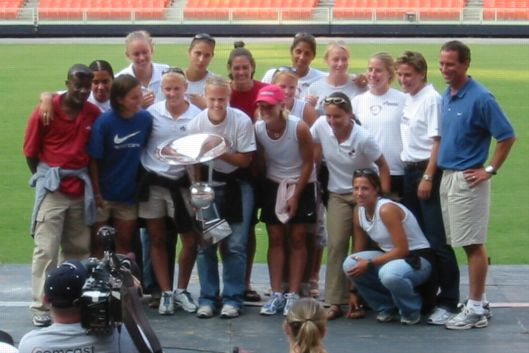
Washington Freedom players and coaches pose with the Founders Cup at RFK Stadium after winning the 2003 WUSA championship

Women's soccer is well developed in the U.S. but has been developed to a lesser extent in Canada. The U.S. women's national soccer team was established in 1985, while the Canada women's national soccer team was established in 1986. In the U.S., the first continental women's league was formed in 1995, then a professional league in 2001.

In 1980, the number of female players was recorded to be roughly 900,000. In 1985, that number had grown to 1.5M, then reached 2M in 1990. Those numbers peaked at 3M in 1995, only to fall to 2.7M in 2000.

The success of the women's American national team has not translated into consistent success for women's professional soccer in the U.S. Established in 2013, the National Women's Soccer League (NWSL), now the most prominent of two top-level U.S. leagues in that sport, is the country's third and longest-lasting attempt to establish such a competition. The USL Super League (USLS) started play in 2024 as a second top-level women's league.

=== National Women's Soccer League ===
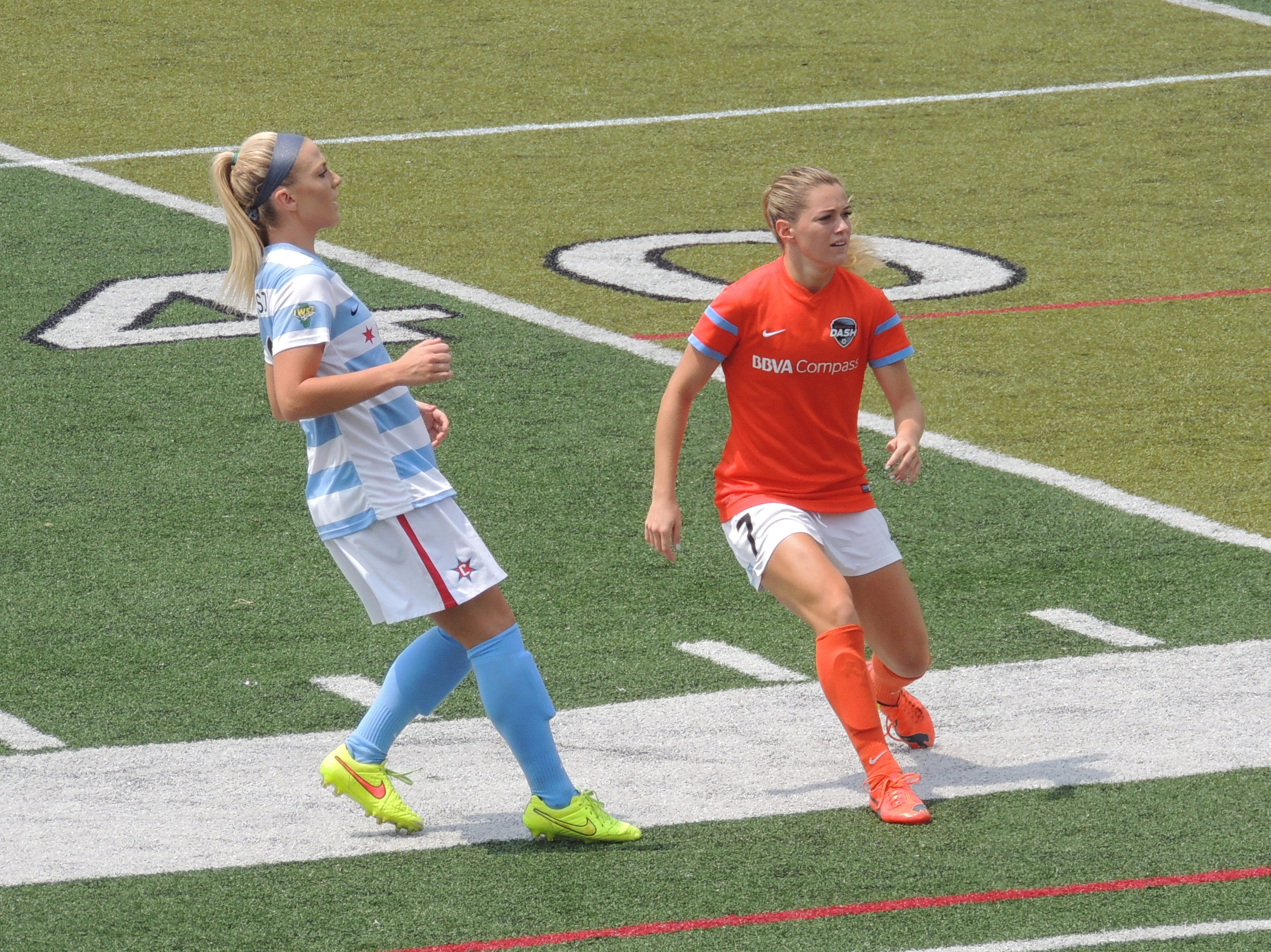
Julie Ertz (then known as Johnston; left) with the Chicago Red Stars during a match against Houston Dash on July 26, 2014

The National Women's Soccer League (NWSL) is the top level professional women's soccer league in the U.S. It began play in spring 2013 with eight teams; four of them were former members of Women's Professional Soccer (WPS), which had been the top women's league in U.S. soccer before folding in 2012.

Fox Sports had a deal to broadcast nine games in 2013, six in the regular season and the three from the playoffs. ESPN2 and ESPN3 had a similar deal for the 2014 season. Prior to the 2017 season, the NWSL and A&E Networks signed a three-year deal in which A&E's Lifetime network would broadcast a weekly Saturday afternoon game; the deal also saw A&E take an ownership stake in the league.

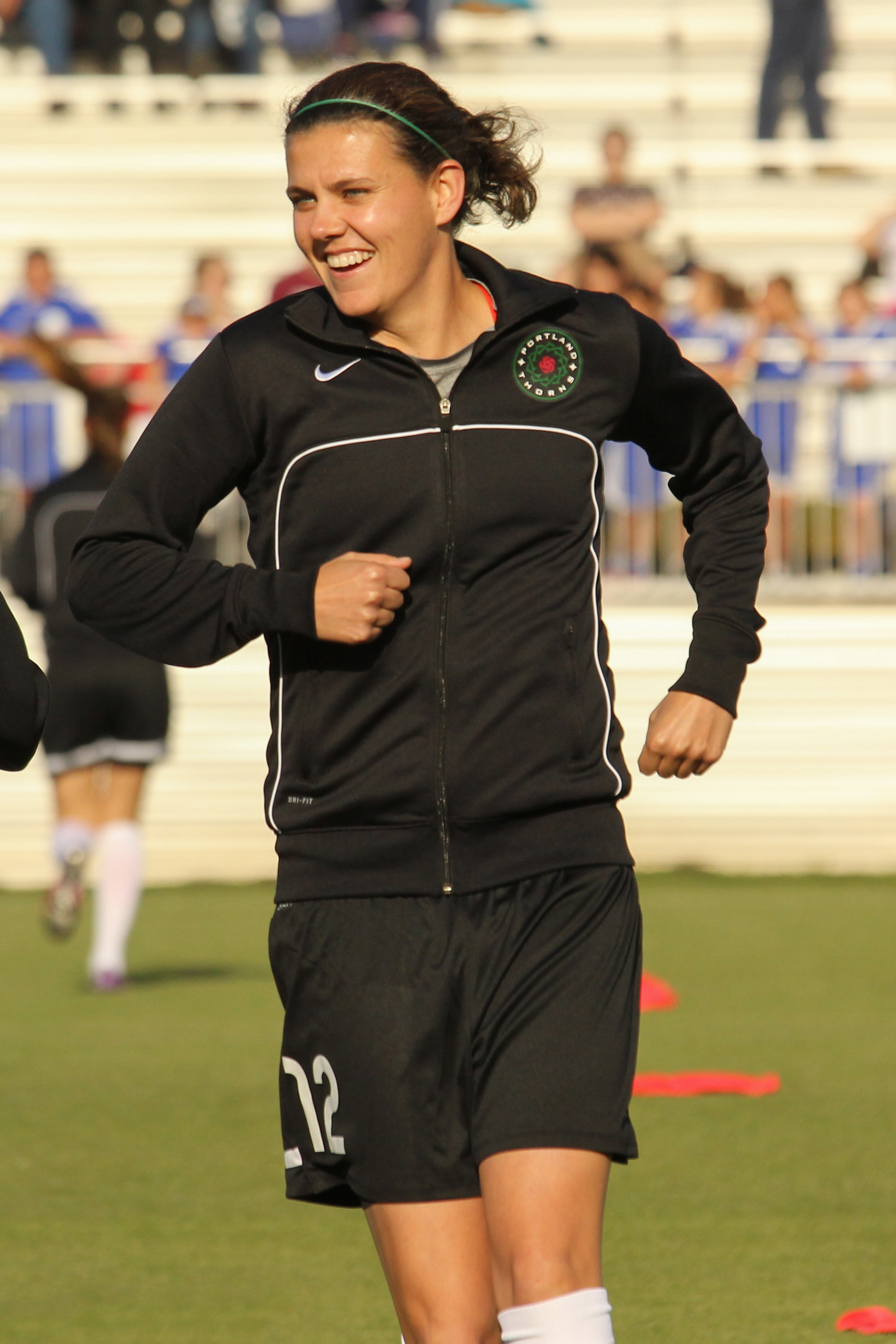
Christine Sinclair legendary Canadian forward, brings experience and goal-scoring prowess to the Portland Thorns FC.

The NWSL became the U.S.'s first women's professional league to play a fourth season in 2016. The league then expanded to 10 teams in 2016 and 2017, before dropping to 9 for the 2018 season. It returned to 10 teams for 2021, and then expanded further to 12 in 2022, 14 in 2024, and 16 teams in 2026. Two more teams will be added in 2028, bringing the total to 18 teams.

Attendance

Portland Thorns FC averaged more than 13,000 attendance at Providence Park in each of the NWSL's first seven seasons, with an all-time high of 20,098 in the 2019 season.

In 2024, a Chicago Red Stars and Bay FC match at Wrigley Field set a single-game attendance record of 35,038. In 2025, a new record was set at a Bay FC and Washington Spirit game with 40,091 fans at Oracle Park. In 2026, the record was raised to 63,004 fans attending a Denver Summit and Washington Spirit game at Mile High Stadium.

The MWSL first broke the 10,000-average-fan mark in 2023. It then averaged 11,250 fans in 2024, a 6% increase. By mid‑2026, attendance was averaging 11,069 fans per game, with speculation that the league would hit a new attendance milestone that season.

=== Women's Premier Soccer League ===
The Women's Premier Soccer League (WPSL) is a national women's soccer league in the U.S. and Puerto Rico, and is on the 2nd level of women's soccer in the U.S. soccer league system, alongside United Women's Soccer (UWS). The WPSL started as the Western Division of the W-League, before breaking away to form its own league in 1998. The league is sanctioned by the United States Adult Soccer Association as an affiliate of the United States Soccer Federation (USSF).

There are both "professional"/senior teams and amateur teams in the WPSL. An organization has to choose to be one or the other due to NCAA regulations, since collegiate players cannot play on "pro" teams.

=== United Women's Soccer ===
United Women's Soccer, variously abbreviated as UWS and UWoSo, shares second-level status with the Women's Premier Soccer League (WPSL). It is a pro-am (professional–amateur) women's soccer league in the U.S. that combines both professional career athletes and amateurs in competition. The league was formed in 2015 as a response to turmoil within the WPSL and the folding of the USL W-League. The first season in 2016 saw 11 teams participate, all in the U.S.; two Canadian teams initially planned to play that season but were not approved by the country's national federation. Three of the original 11 teams did not return for the league's second season, but UWS still nearly doubled in size for that season, with one Canadian team and 12 American teams entering the league.

=== USL Super League ===
The USL Super League (USLS) is a fully professional top-level women's soccer league that began its inaugural season in August 2024. In September 2021, the United Soccer League, which operates a system of lower-level leagues for men, women, and youth, announced it would launch the "USL Super League" for the 2023 season. The Super League's launch was later put off to 2024. Prior to its first season, USLS was granted Division I status by U.S. Soccer, putting it at the same level as the NWSL. Unlike most other U.S. soccer leagues, the USLS originally played a fall-to-spring schedule, in line with the FIFA international calendar and most European leagues. However, beginning in 2027, the USLS will change its schedule to match the NWSL, playing from the spring into the fall.

=== USL W League ===
The USL W League launched in June 2021, with its inaugural season starting in May 2022. The league began with eight clubs but expanded to over 40 clubs in time for its first season. There were seven divisions (Deep South, Great Lakes, Heartland, Metropolitan, Mid-Atlantic, South Atlantic, and Southeast) comprising teams from 20 states. As of 2026, the league has more than 90 teams. It should not be confused with the now defunct USL W-League, which was a developmental organization that operated for 21 seasons from 1995 to 2015.

== Softball ==
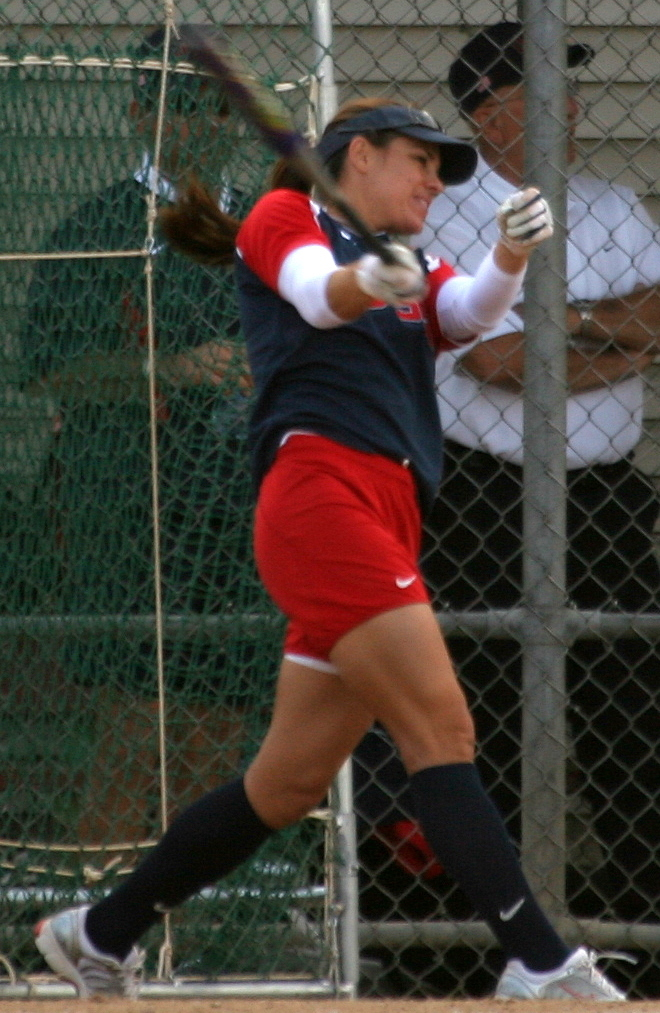
Known for achievements in international, professional, and collegiate softball, Jessica Mendoza played a significant role in advancing the sport's visibility and is now a sports broadcaster.

Women's professional softball has existed in the U.S. since 1997, with the Women’s Pro Softball League (WPSL) from 1997–2001, which then became National Pro Fastpitch (NPF) from 2004–2021. USA Softball, formerly the Amateur Softball Association (ASA), is the national governing body of softball in America.

=== Women's Professional Fastpitch ===
Women's Professional Fastpitch (WPF) launched its inaugural season in June 2022. The WPF league is unrelated to the defunct league that used the names National Pro Fastpitch (NPF) and Women's Pro Softball League (WPSL) and the initial "Women's Professional Fastpitch" from the 1980s.

=== Athletes Unlimited Softball League ===
The Athletes Unlimited Softball League (AUSL) is the newest league for women's professional softball in the U.S. It was founded in 2024 and launched its inaugural season in 2025 with four teams.

== Other sports ==
=== Roller derby ===
Invented in the 1930s, roller derby is a roller skating contact sport played by amateur leagues worldwide, though it is most popular in the U.S., with more than 50,000 women participating in Women's Flat Track Derby Association (WFTDA) in 2017.

==== Women's Flat Track Derby Association ====
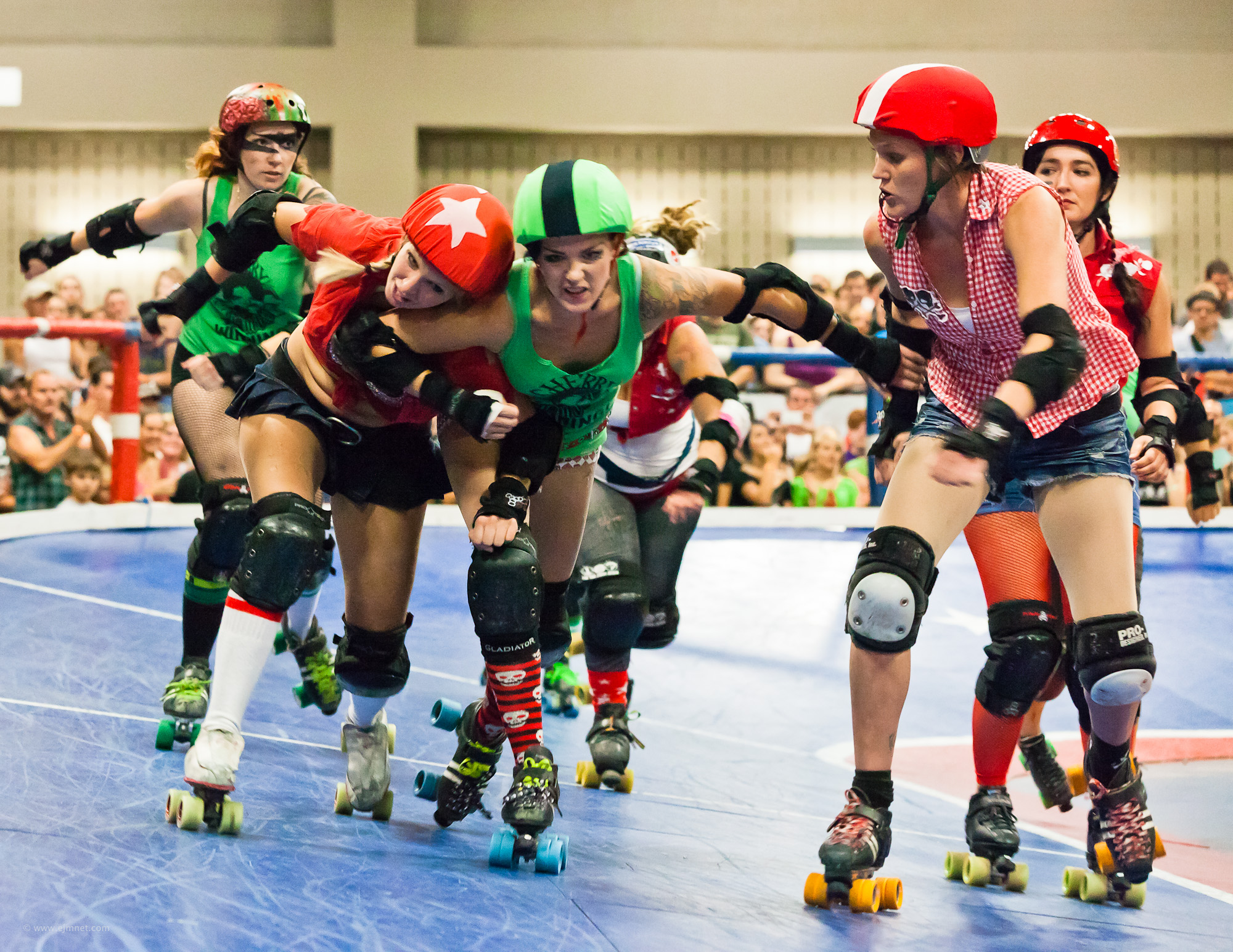
The Lonestar Rollergirls in Austin, Texas, play on a banked track. Cherry Bombs (Green) vs. Rhinestone Cowgirls (Red) on August 27, 2011.

The Women's Flat Track Derby Association (WFTDA) is an association of women's flat track roller derby leagues in the U.S. The organization was founded in April 2004 as the United Leagues Coalition (ULC) but was renamed in November 2005.

The WFTDA Championships are the leading competition for roller derby leagues. The Championships are organized by the WFTDA. They originated in 2006 as the National WFTDA Championship. Full WFTDA members are eligible for ranking in one of the association's four regions. Each region holds a tournament contested by its top ten leagues: the Eastern, North Central, South Central, and Western Regional Tournaments. The top three leagues from each of these four tournaments qualify for the Championships. Together, the qualifying tournaments and Championships are termed the "Big 5". Since 2008, the winner of the National championships has been awarded the Hydra Trophy.

In January 2009, Montreal Roller Derby became the first Canadian league admitted as a member. The league was WFTDA's 66th member, and was placed in the East region. In June 2010, the WFTDA announced the first round of Apprentice league graduates, and formed two new regions (Canada and Europe) outside of the U.S.; leagues in those regions will compete in the closest U.S. region until they develop more fully. In 2019, the WFTDA hosted its first international championship outside of America in Montreal, Canada. By the mid-2020s, roller derby was making headlines for its inclusivity among players.

=== Ringette ===
Ringette was created by Canada's Sam Jacks and Red McCarthy in 1963 in Northern Ontario. Developed for female players, ringette is a fast-paced team sport on ice in which players use a straight stick to pass, carry, and shoot a rubber ring to score goals. For 10 years, play centered in Ontario and Quebec, but the sport quickly spread across Canada and is now played by 50,000 girls internationally. Ringette Canada is the governing body that oversees ringette in Canada.

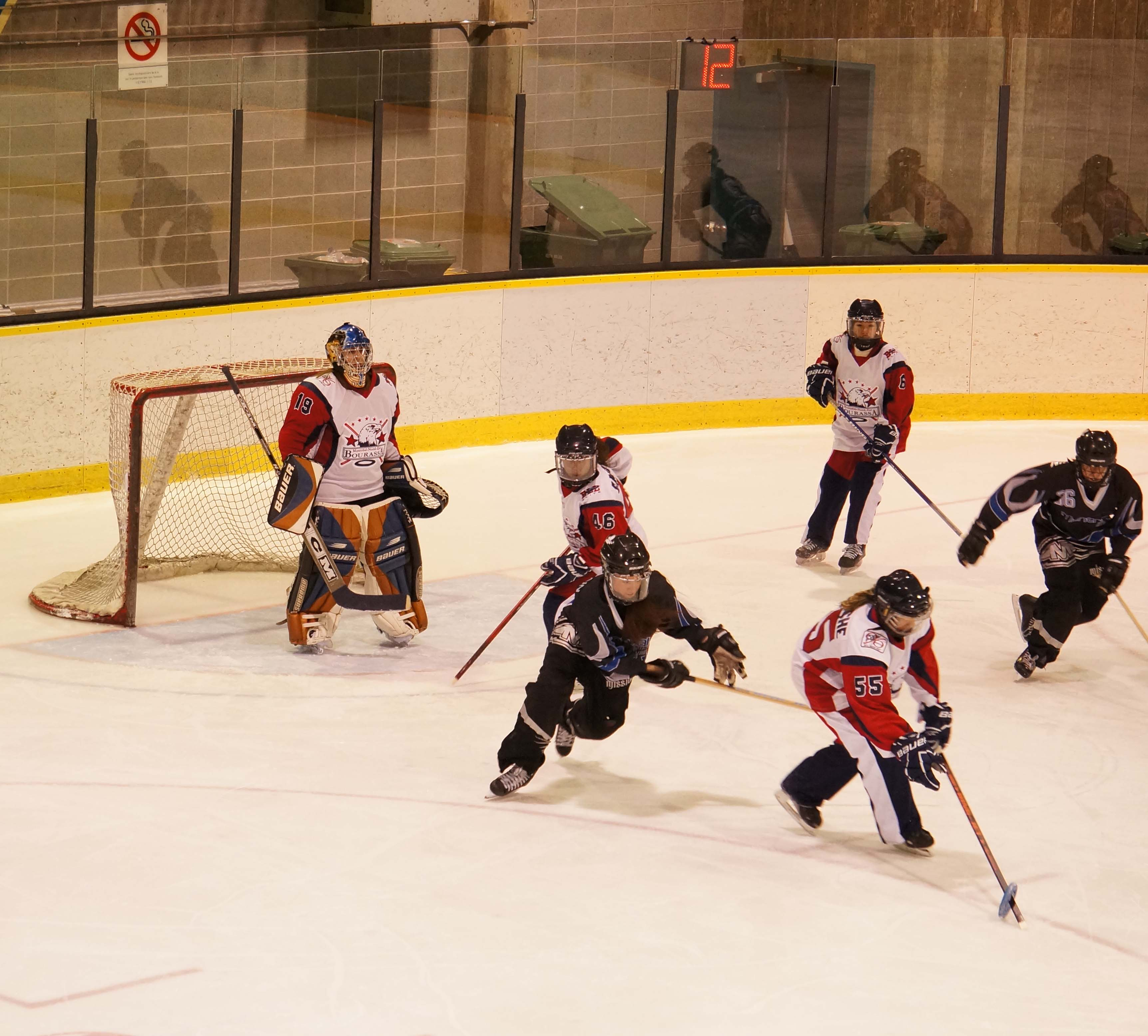
National Ringette League game in 2012

==== National Ringette League ====
The National Ringette League (NRL) is Canada's premiere league for the sport of ringette in North America but exists exclusively in Canada. To date, no American NRL teams have been created or entered the league, though some NRL players have come from America and Finland. (The U.S. national ringette team, known as "Team USA", is the ringette team that represents America internationally.) The NRL is semi-professional and acts as a showcase league for the sport of ringette and a place for those scouting for ringette talent.

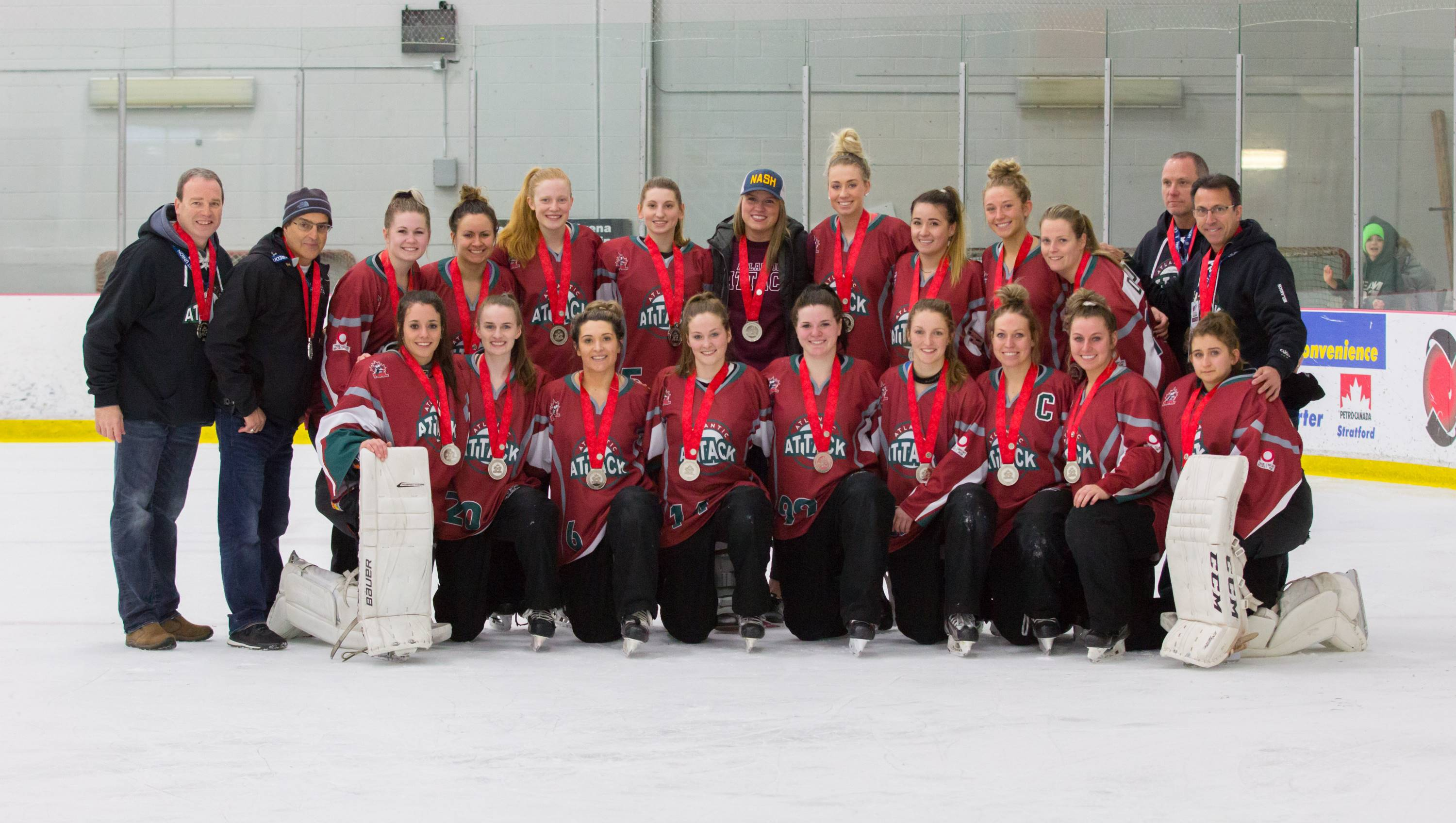
On April 13 the Atlantic Attack win the silver medal at the 2019 Canadian Ringette Championship in Charlottetown, P.E.I.

The creation of the NRL followed the success of the 2002 World Ringette Championships in Edmonton, Alberta, Canada, where Canada won the gold medal and the Sam Jacks Trophy, the premiere trophy for the sport. The first NRL season began in November 2004 with 17 teams. The NRL entered its eighth season in 2011–12 season with 19 teams playing in two conferences across Canada—a Western Conference with 6 teams and an Eastern Conference with 13 teams.

By 2008, the budget of each NRL team ranged from $15,000–$20,000. The teams and the league contribute to cover transportation, accommodations, and the rent of arenas. Players, however, are not paid to play and must find their own financiers to cover their equipment and personal spending. The audience for several NRL teams is limited to hundreds of spectators. For a time, the NRL had a cover broadcast thanks to a partnership with Webchannel SSN-Canada with the championship final game broadcast on Rogers TV.

In the 2010–11 season, a NRL Championship Tournament replaced the Championship qualifying rounds. This tournament takes place in just one city, allowing the league to create a media event and to hold attention. From March 27 until April 2, 2011, the NRL Championship Tournament took place in Cambridge, Ontario. In the Final, the Edmonton WAM! defeated the Cambridge Turbos.

The NRL maintains a collaboration with the lower Ringette leagues in regards the development of the young girls players. Several NRL teams have affiliated development teams with athletes in the Under 19 year (U19) and Under 16 year (U16). The Canadian Ringette Championships (CRC) for U16 and U19 usually takes place annually in April and also takes place in the same place as the NRL playoff tournament. Ringette Canada hosted the CRC in Ottawa, Ontario for two consecutive years in 2025 and 2026. In 2026, 900 athletes from 50 teams competed for national championships in the U16, U19, and NRL (18+) divisions.

== Defunct leagues ==
=== Women's United Soccer Association ===
The Women's United Soccer Association (WUSA) was the world's first women's soccer league in which all the players were paid as professionals. Founded in February 2000, the league began its first season in April 2001 with eight teams in the U.S. The league suspended operations on September 15, 2003, shortly after the end of its third season.

=== Women's Professional Soccer (WPS) ===
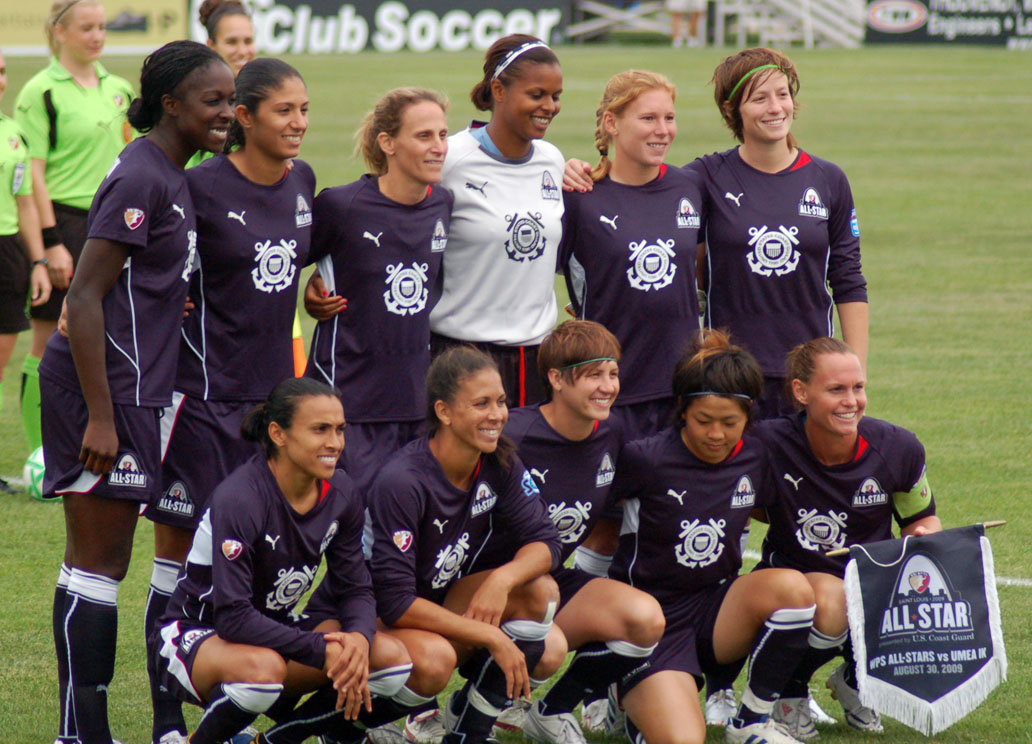
Women's Professional Soccer All-Star team in 2009

Women's Professional Soccer (WPS) was the top level professional women's soccer league in the U.S. It began play on March 29, 2009, and folded in 2012. The league was composed of seven teams for its first two seasons and fielded six teams for the 2011 season. The league wanted ten teams for the 2012 season, with most of the new groups potentially coming from the western half of the country, but ultimately no ownership groups were ready to join in time. The league's failure was marked by low attendance (2009: 4,684, 2010: 3,588 and 2011: 3,518) and problems with (ex-Freedom) magicJack owner Dan Borislow.

Former WPS commissioner Tonya Antonucci said that unlike WUSA, which had higher expectations and employed a top-down model, WPS would take "a slow and steady growth type of approach", citing WUSA's losses of close to $100M. She said the new league would have a closer relationship with Major League Soccer, the top men's professional league in the U.S., to cut costs on staff and facilities, and for marketing. The team budgets for the inaugural season was $2.5M.

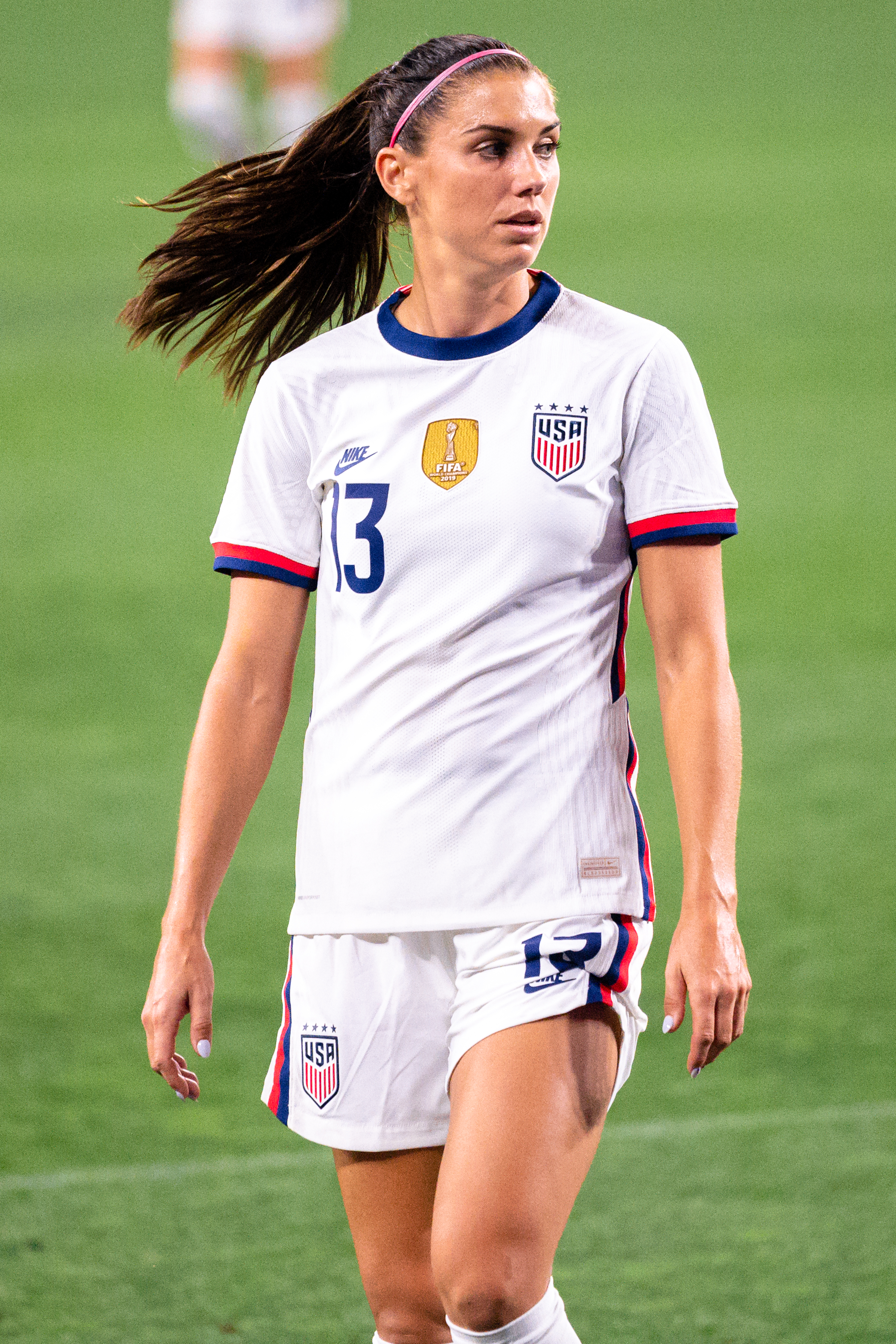
Alex Morgan American forward known for her speed, agility, and goal-scoring prowess. Morgan was a key player for the US Women's National Team (USWNT) and also made significant contributions in professional club leagues.

Fox Soccer Channel and Fox Sports en Español broadcast weekly Sunday night matches and the WPS All-Star Game, with Fox Sports Net broadcasting the semifinal and league championship contests. The national television contract was in effect through the 2011 season with an option for 2012.

On January 30, 2012, WPS announced suspension of operations for the 2012 season, citing several internal organization struggles as the primary cause. Issues included an ongoing legal battle with magicJack owner Dan Borislow and the lack of resources invested in the league.

In 2009, its inaugural match had 14,832 supporters in attendance at the Home Depot Center (now Dignity Health Sports Park) in Carson, California, with the Los Angeles Sol beating the Washington Freedom 2–0.

The 2011 WPS Championship game at Sahlen's Stadium (now Marina Auto Stadium) in Rochester had 10,461 supporters in attendance. The game saw the Western New York Flash claim a 1–1 (5–4, PK's) victory over the Philadelphia Independence.

=== Women's Premier Soccer League Elite ===
The Women's Premier Soccer League Elite (WPSL Elite) was established in 2012 by the Women's Premier Soccer League (WPSL), responding both to an increased interest in professionalism by existing WPSL teams and the desire of WPS teams for a continuing competitive outlet. The league defined itself as semi-professional, but five of its eight charter teams were to be fully professional. Three of these—the Boston Breakers, Chicago Red Stars, and Western New York Flash—previously played in WPS.

=== United Soccer League Women's League (USL W-League) ===
The USL W-League was a North American women's soccer developmental organization from 1995–2015, and should not be confused with the existing third-level USL W League which launched in 2022. The former USL W-League was an open league, giving college players the opportunity to play alongside established international players while maintaining their collegiate eligibility. The league was administered by the United Soccer League system, which now oversees the men's USL Championship, USL League One (launched in 2019) and USL League Two (Premier Development League before 2019), as well as the current USL Super League and USL W League.

=== Canadian Women's Hockey League ===
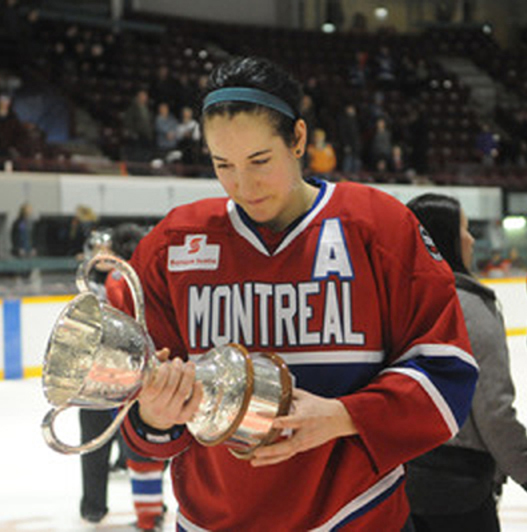
Caroline Ouellette with Clarkson Cup on March 27, 2011

The Canadian Women's Hockey League (CHWL) was a women's hockey league in Canada for top female hockey players. The CWHL helped women's professional hockey rebound from the demise of the original National Women's Hockey League (NWHL) in 2007. After the collapse of the CWHL in 2019, the Professional Women's Hockey Players Association (PWHPA) was formed. While over 150 players, including most North American ice hockey Olympians, were exclusively affiliated with one of the organization's regional hubs and a number of games are organized between them, the PWHPA is not organized under a formal league structure.

In the 2017–18 season, the CWHL grew to seven teams: two in the Greater Toronto Area, Les Canadiennes de Montreal, the Calgary Inferno, the Worcester Blades, and the Chinese Kunlun Red Star WIH and Vanke Rays. The Chinese teams served to jump-start that nation's development in women's hockey, as the country would host the 2022 Winter Olympics.

The CWHL allowed elite level players to play after college and continue to work toward Olympic and national team success. Prior to the 2017–18 season, players were not paid and only received incentives. Apart from ice rink time, hotels, transportation (mostly by bus), and some items covered by the league, players paid for all other expenses related to playing at this level (equipment, training, insurance, health services, etc.), and all staff (coaches, general managers, communications workers) served as volunteers. As a result, most players and personnel had jobs outside of hockey.

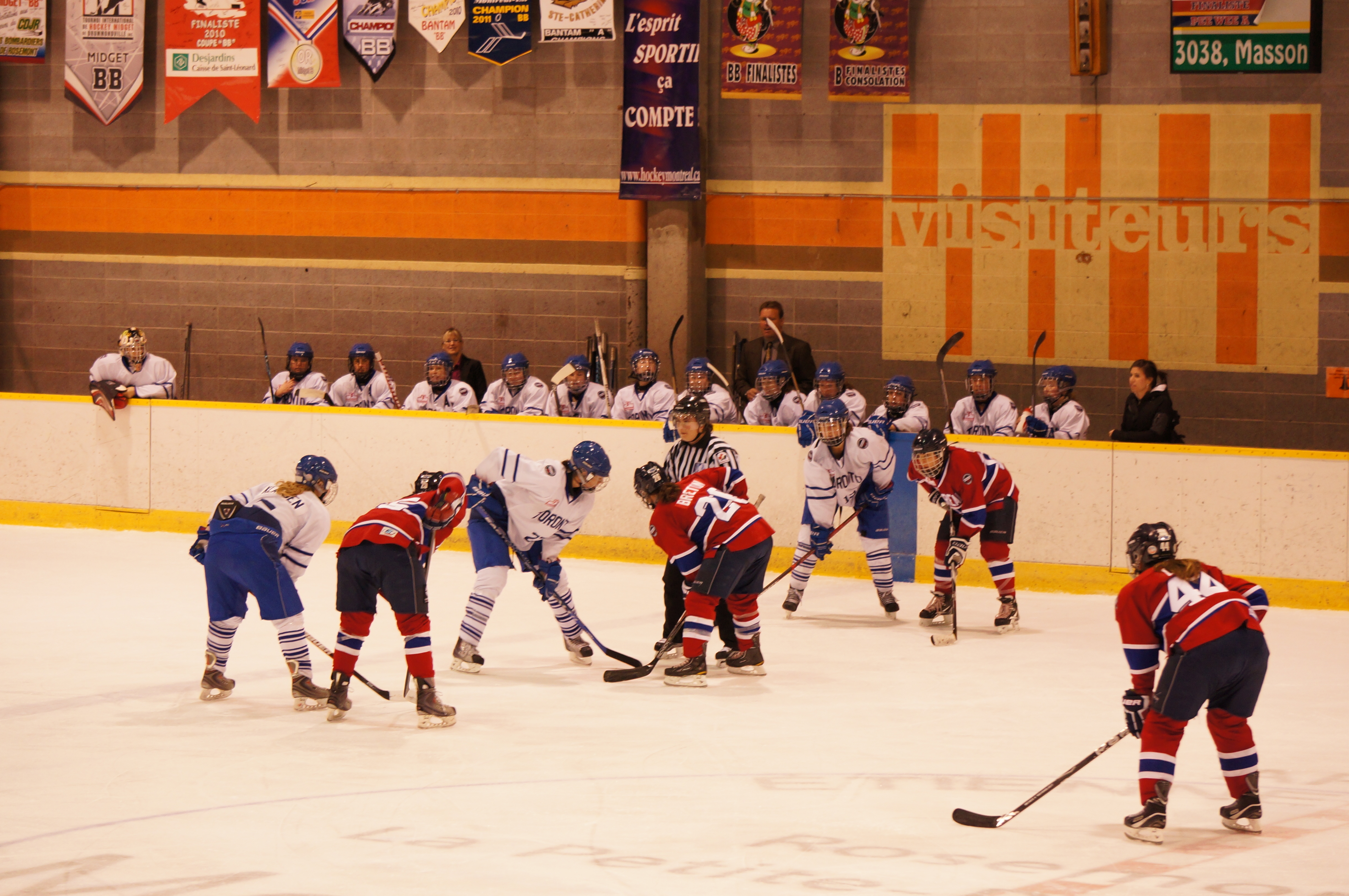
Game between the Toronto Furies and Montreal Stars

In 2010, the Toronto Star reported the cost of running the league was about $1.7M. For the 2010–11 season, income was $800,000. League profits were then redistributed among the teams as the league was registered as non-profit amateur organization, resulting in insufficient funds to pay players. In 2017, the CWHL began paying players a stipend up to $10,000 per season, reportedly coming from increased revenue via the China expansion, while maintaining its amateur registration. The stipends added about $600,000 to annual expenses.

League attendance was very low in the regular season, but increased during the playoffs. In 2011, the Championship Final game drew 2,300 fans at Barrie Molson Centre in Barrie, Ontario. Several CWHL matches were broadcast online and TSN broadcast the Clarkson Cup championship match.

On March 31, 2019, the CWHL announced the league would discontinue operations effective May 1, 2019. The league's expansion and added costs had caused operation costs to grow to $4.2M in the 2017–18 season.

=== International Women's Professional Softball Associations ===
Ladies Professional Golf Association (LPGA) tour member Janie Blaylock, softball legend Joan Joyce, and tennis icon Billie Jean King were the founders of the International Women's Professional Softball Associations (IWPSA) in 1976. There were 10 teams in the league from Meriden, Connecticut, to San Jose, California. During the first season, the teams played 120 games in a schedule season. The league ran for four years and was closed due to lack of funds and high travel and facility costs.

=== Women's Pro Softball League ===
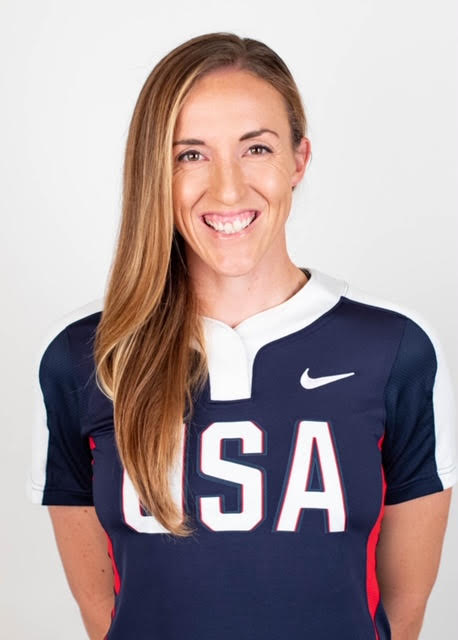
Monica Abbott pitcher, known for her incredible speed and dominance on the mound.

Originally called the Women's Pro Fastpitch (WPF), the Women's Pro Softball League (WPSL) was founded in 1997 and folded in 2001. The league was started by former Utah State University softball player, Jane Cowles and her collegiate coach, John Horan in February 1989. After eight years of research and planning, combined efforts resulted in its launch in May 1997.

In 1986 and 1987, the U.S. women's national softball team won gold medals in the World Championships and the Pan American Games, respectively. Jane Cowles formulated a plan for a women's professional softball league, which she showed her parents, John and Sage Cowles, owners of Cowles Media Company, in February 1989. They agreed to help with the financial make up of the league. In 1997, the Cowles family and AT&T Wireless Services launched the WPF league. After one full year and two seasons of play, the league's name was changed to the WPSL in 1998. It had four teams located in Eastern U.S. in 2000: the Akron Racers, Florida Wahoos, Ohio Pride, and Tampa Bay FireStrix. The WPSL ran until 2001, lasting four seasons before lack of funds, high travel costs, and inadequate facilities led to its closure.

In 2001, the "Tour of Fastpitch Champions" enabled the WPSL to expand. From this, the league traveled to 11 cities to find different candidates for WPSL teams to play. They played games against All-Star teams and Canada teams, many of which were televised on ESPN2 or ESPN. The WPSL decided to suspend the 2002 season to reorganize and have more time to find other teams to play. In 2003, the league reemerged as National Pro Fastpitch (NPF) with Major League Baseball (MLB) partnering with them to continue the MBL's efforts to connect with female athletes.

=== National Pro Fastpitch ===
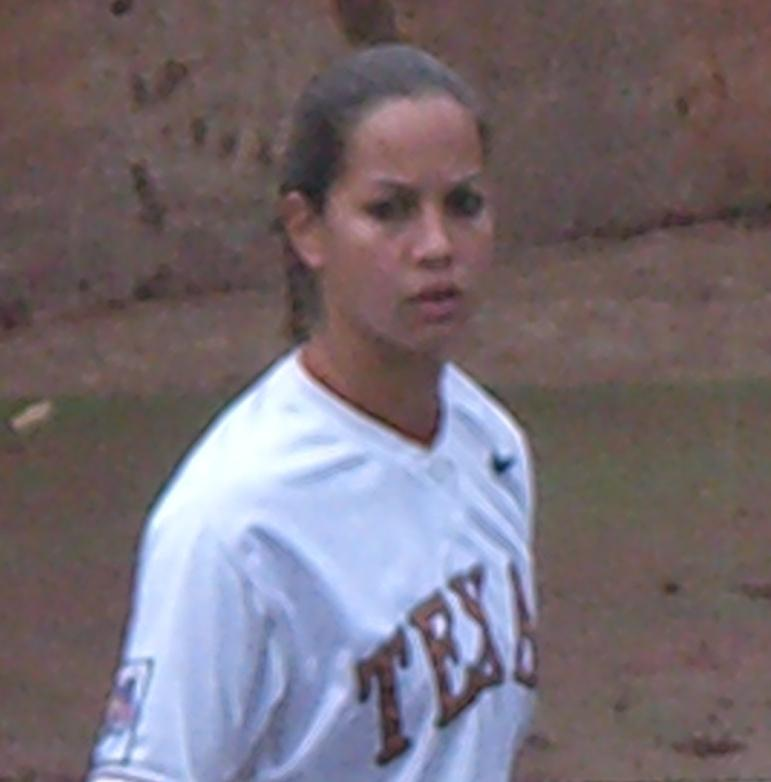
Cat Osterman pitcher known for her left-handed prowess and multiple accolades in the sport.

National Pro Fastpitch (NPF), formerly the Women's Pro Softball League (WPSL), was a professional women's softball league in the U.S. in which teams battled for the Cowles Cup. The WPSL was founded in 1997 and folded in 2001; the NPF revived the league in 2004. However, a new softball league began in 2022, the Women's Professional Fastpitch (WPF) league, and the NPF was disbanded.

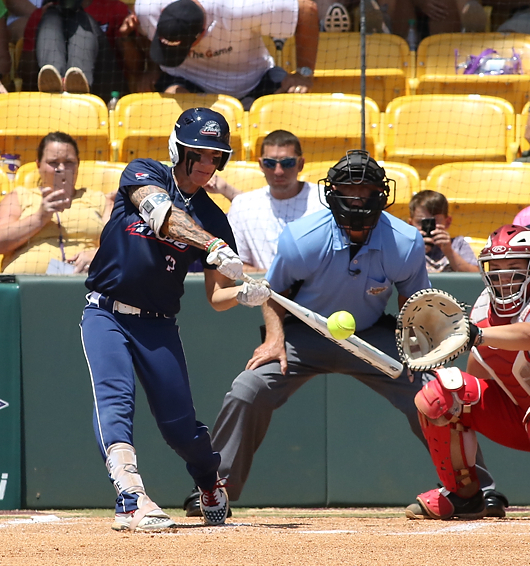
Kelly Kretschman Outfielder, known for her consistent hitting.

The National Pro Fastpitch league was revived in 2004 as an official development partner of MLB in the women's fastpitch softball. In 2004, a new season began within six markets: Stockton, California; Tucson, Arizona; Houston, Texas; Akron, Ohio; Lowell, Massachusetts; Montclair, New Jersey. Having more teams allowed the league to participate in more games with 178 league-wide games, involving 96 female softball players. In 2006, the Philadelphia Force, the Connecticut Brakettes, the Chicago Bandits, and the New England Riptide joined the league, expanding the season and competition.

In 2009, after Team USA won a silver medal, several Olympians returned to the NPF: Monica Abbott for Washington, Jennie Finch for Chicago, and Cat Osterman for Rockford. At that time, four teams participated in 50 regular-season games: Akron Racers, Chicago Bandits, Florida Pride and Tennessee Diamonds. By 2016, six teams took part in the 50-game regular season, with the league having added the Pennsylvania Rebellion and Scrap Yards Dawgs.

In 2011, the USSSA Florida Pride took the Ringer Cup Title with a league record of 30–9. Also in 2011, for the second year in a row, the NPF All-Stars performed a tour playing 19 college teams in 11 stops across the U.S. In 2015, league attendance hit a single-game record of 12,175 at ESPN's Wide World of Sports Complex in Orlando, Florida.

The 2020 and 2021 seasons were both cancelled due to the COVID-19 pandemic and to prepare for the Tokyo Olympics. The NPF was then disband in August 2021.

== See also ==
- Women's sports
- Women's professional sports
- List of professional sports teams in the United States and Canada
