= Kia Nurse =

Canadian basketball player (born 1996)

- Nurse with Canada in 2026

No. 11 – Toronto Tempo
- Position: Shooting guard / point guard
- League: WNBA

Personal information
- Born: February 22, 1996 (age 30) Hamilton, Ontario, Canada
- Listed height: 6 ft 0 in (1.83 m)
- Listed weight: 195 lb (88 kg)

Career information
- High school: St. Thomas More (Hamilton, Ontario)
- College: UConn (2014–2018)
- WNBA draft: 2018: 1st round, 10th overall pick
- Drafted by: New York Liberty
- Playing career: 2018–present

Career history
- 2018–2020: New York Liberty
- 2018–2020: Canberra Capitals
- 2021–2022: Phoenix Mercury
- 2023: Seattle Storm
- 2024: Los Angeles Sparks
- 2025: Chicago Sky
- 2026–present: Toronto Tempo

Career highlights
- WNBA All-Star (2019); 2× WNBL champion (2019, 2020); WNBL Most Valuable Player (2020); 2× NCAA champion (2015, 2016); WBCA Defensive Player of the Year (2018); AAC Freshman of the Year (2015); AAC Defensive Player of the Year (2018)
- Stats at Basketball Reference
Medals
Women's basketball
Representing Canada
FIBA Women's AmeriCup
Gold medal – first place	2015 Edmonton
Gold medal – first place	2017 Buenos Aires
Silver medal – second place	2013 Mexico
Pan American Games
Gold medal – first place	2015 Toronto	Team

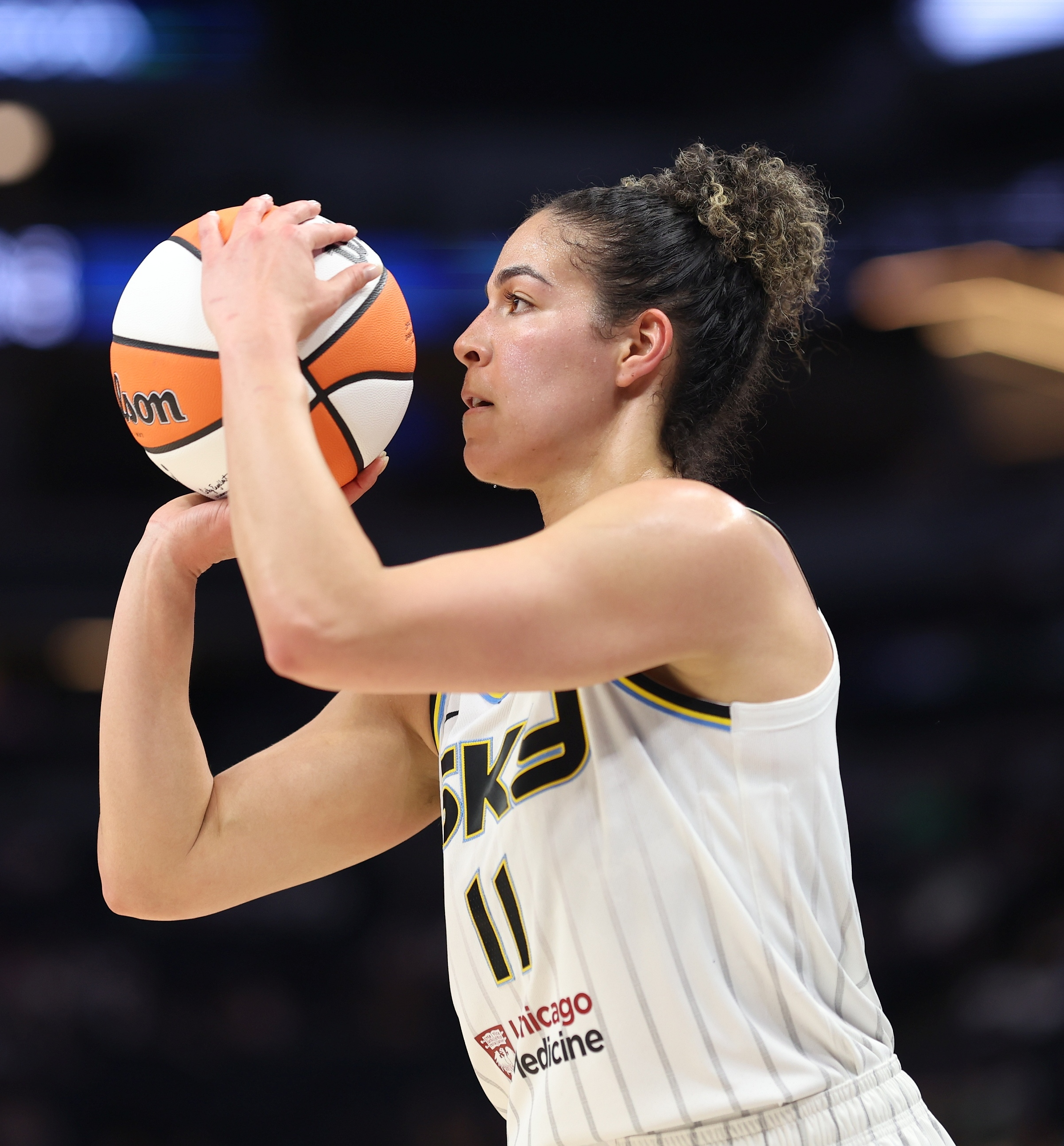
Nurse with the Chicago Sky in 2025

Kia Augustine Nurse (born February 22, 1996) is a Canadian professional basketball player for the Toronto Tempo of the Women's National Basketball Association (WNBA) and Athletes Unlimited Pro Basketball. She is also a basketball analyst featured on TSN.

Nurse has played for the Canada Women's National Basketball team. She was selected to play in the 2020 Summer Olympics.

== Early life ==
Kia Nurse began playing basketball at the age of four, and by the time she was seven years old, she was playing in a competitive league. Nurse attended St. Vincent de Paul Elementary School.

Nurse played basketball while attending St. Thomas More Catholic Secondary School in Hamilton, Ontario. During her playing career, she helped the team win three consecutive OFSAA high school championships in 2011, 2012 and 2013. She played for the Hamilton Transway Club team, winning seven consecutive provincial championships.

== College career ==
Nurse played college basketball at the University of Connecticut in Storrs, Connecticut for the Huskies. In her time at UConn, Nurse played under head coach Geno Auriemma, alongside players such as Breanna Stewart, Gabby Williams and Napheesa Collier.

Approximately 50 colleges and universities contacted Nurse to ask her to consider playing for their team. She initially narrowed down the list to four teams, Connecticut, Penn State, Indiana, and Kentucky, but eventually chose Connecticut. After signing her letter of intent, she revealed that she had recorded a goal of playing for Connecticut when she was in Grade 7.

== Professional career ==
=== WNBA ===
At the 2018 WNBA draft, Nurse was drafted by the New York Liberty in the first round as the tenth overall pick. Nurse joined the Liberty alongside players such as Tina Charles and Epiphanny Prince. Nurse made her WNBA debut on May 20, 2018, scoring 17 points in an eventual 80–76 loss to the Chicago Sky. In June 2018, Nurse scored 34 points, a season-high amongst WNBA rookies, in the Liberty's 87–81 overtime victory over the Indiana Fever.

In July 2019, Nurse was named as a starter for the WNBA All-Star Game for the first time in her career. Her selection made her just the third Canadian to play in the All-Star Game. Nurse was selected by and joined Team Delle Donne for the game. Nurse also participated in the Three-Point Contest but was one of four competitors eliminated in the first round.

Nurse was traded to the Phoenix Mercury with Megan Walker by the Liberty for the 2021 season for the Mercury's 2021 and 2022 first-round picks. Nurse tore her ACL in Game 4 of the WNBA semifinals against the Aces, which led to her to missing the remaining postseason games. The Mercury lost in the finals against the Chicago Sky. On February 5, 2022, the Mercury announced that they had re-signed Nurse for the 2022 season. Nurse's injury caused her to miss the entire 2022 season.

On January 31, 2024, Nurse was traded by the Seattle Storm to the Los Angeles Sparks alongside the 2024 WNBA draft first-round pick (fourth overall) for the Sparks' 2026 first-round pick.

On February 4, 2025, Nurse signed with the Chicago Sky. In 2025, Nurse averaged 7.8 points and 2.3 rebounds per game. In a game against the Golden State Valkyries on August 1, she notched a career-high seven assists.

On April 14, 2026, Nurse signed with the expansion Toronto Tempo, she became the first Canadian player to sign for the first Canadian team in the WNBA.

=== Athletes Unlimited ===
Nurse made her Athletes Unlimited Pro Basketball debut during the 2025 season, finishing ninth on the final leaderboard with 4,254 points. She averaged 15.8 points and 5.4 rebounds per game, earned three Game MVP awards, and served as a team captain during Week Two. In 2026, Nurse returned to Athletes Unlimited Pro Basketball for her second season with the league.

== National team career ==
=== Youth level ===
Nurse was invited to play on the under-17 national team in the FIBA Under-17 World Championship for Women, held in Amsterdam in 2012. She averaged almost 14 points per game and helped the team finish third place.

=== Senior level ===
Nurse was invited to join the national team, to play in the 2013 FIBA Americas Championship for Women, held in Xalapa, Mexico from September 21–28. She averaged ten points per game and helped the Canadian National team to a second place, silver medal finish. Canada faced Cuba in a preliminary round and won 53–40, but in the championship game, Cuba prevailed 79–71.

Nurse played on the Canadian national team in the 2014 FIBA World Championship. The team lost to Australia in the quarterfinals, then beat France and China to finish in fifth place. Nurse averaged almost 22 minutes per game at the point guard position, averaging almost seven points per game, fourth most on the roster while being the team’s youngest player.

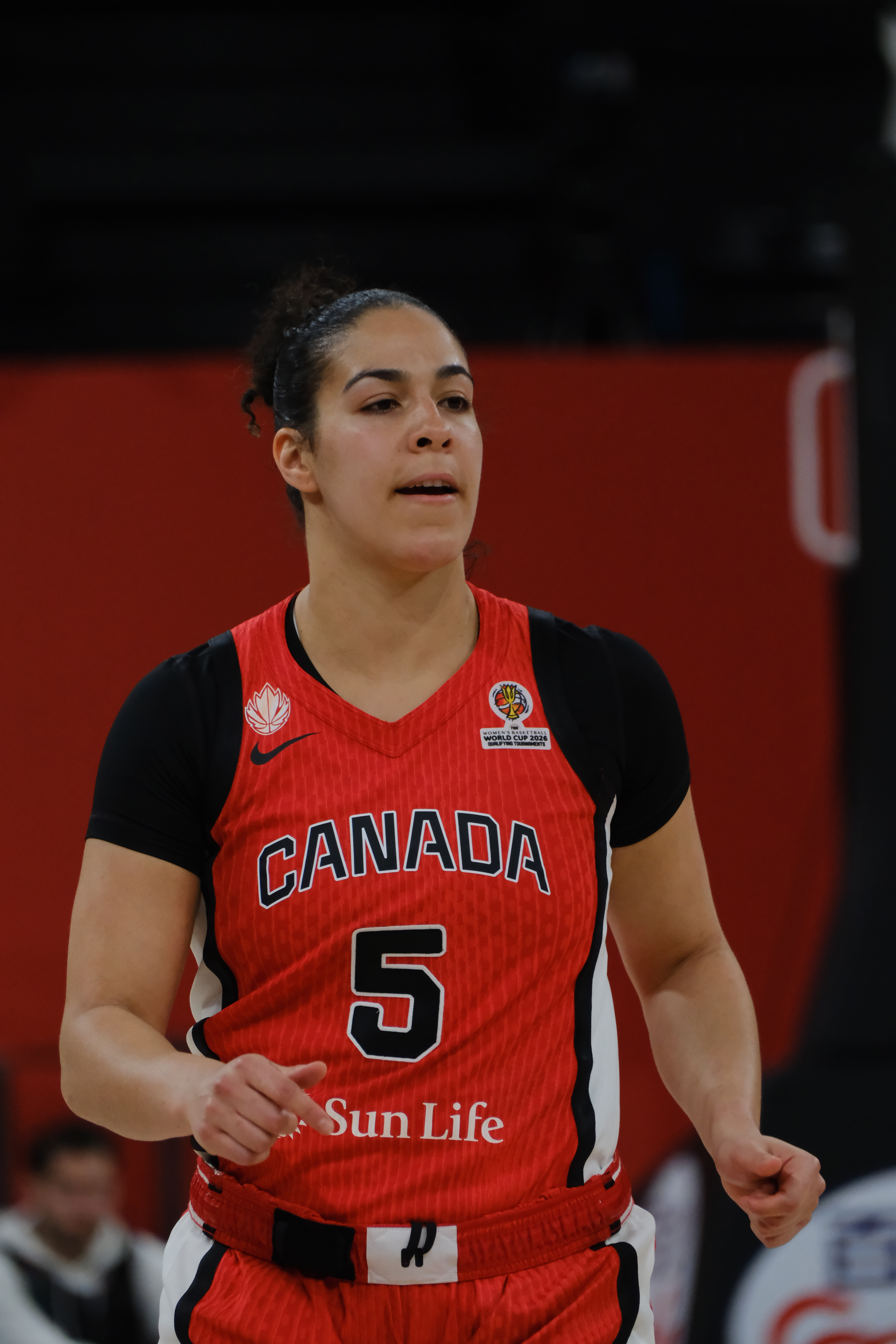
Nurse with Canada in 2026

Nurse was a member of the Canada women's national basketball team, which participated in basketball at the 2015 Pan American Games held in Toronto, Ontario from July 10-26. Canada opened the preliminary rounds with an easy 101–38 win over Venezuela. The following day they beat Argentina 73–58. The final preliminary game was against Cuba; both teams were 2–0, so the winner would win the group. The game went down to the wire, with Canada eking out a 71–68 win. Canada defeated Brazil in the semifinal, 91–63. In front of a home crowd, the Canadians were able to take down the United States 81–73 and take home the gold medal. It was Canada's first gold medal in basketball in the Pan Am games. Nurse was the star for Canada with 33 points, hitting 11 of her 12 free-throw attempts and 10 of her 17 field-goal attempts, including two of three three-pointers. Her performance led to her selection as the flag-bearer in the event's closing ceremonies.

Nurse played for Canada at the 2015 FIBA Americas Women's Championship, a qualifying event held in Edmonton, Alberta, Canada, in August 2015. Canada won the first three games, easily winning first place in the group for a spot in the semifinal against the second-place team in group B, Brazil. The semifinal game against Brazil was much closer. Canada led by only six points at halftime but gradually expanded the lead to end up with an 83–66 win and a spot in the gold-medal game. The gold-medal game was a rematch with Cuba where Canada took home the win, 82–66. As the game wound down to the close, the crowd was chanting "Rio", "Rio", "Rio" in recognition of the fact that the win qualifies Canada for the Olympics in Rio in 2016. Nurse was the leading scorer for Canada with 20 points, and her overall performance earned her the MVP award for the entire event.

In 2016, Nurse made her Olympic debut for Team Canada at the Summer Olympics in Rio de Janeiro. Canada finished in seventh place. Nurse was announced as a member of the 2020 Tokyo Olympic squad on June 29, 2021. Canada finished in 9th place overall.

== Career statistics ==
Legend
GP	Games played	GS	Games started	MPG	Minutes per game	RPG	Rebounds per game
APG	Assists per game	SPG	Steals per game	BPG	Blocks per game	PPG	Points per game
TO	Turnovers per game	FG%	Field-goal percentage	3P%	3-point field-goal percentage	FT%	Free-throw percentage
**Bold**	Career best	°	League leader

*	Denotes season(s) in which Nurse won an NCAA Championship

=== WNBA ===
==== Regular season ====
WNBA regular season statistics
Year	Team	GP	GS	MPG	FG%	3P%	FT%	RPG	APG	SPG	BPG	TO	PPG
2018	New York	34	7	22.8	**.402**	.294	.870	2.4	1.6	**.7**	.1	.9	9.1
2019	New York	34	34	**29.4**	.393	**.353**	.872	2.5	**2.3**	**.7**	.1	1.6	**13.7**
2020	New York	21	18	27.5	.273	.238	.864	2.9	**2.3**	.5	**.2**	2.2	12.2
2021	Phoenix	32	32	26.1	.359	**.353**	.790	**3.5**	1.8	.5	.1	1.5	9.5
2022	Did not play (injury)												
2023	Seattle	40	**40**	19.7	.343	.350	.889	2.3	1.3	.6	.1	.7	5.9
2024	Los Angeles	40	27	20.3	.388	.331	.793	1.6	1.3	.5	.0	1.2	7.6
2025	Chicago	**44**	18	21.9	.354	.335	.790	2.3	1.3	.3	.0	1.3	7.2
2026	Toronto	43	4	14.3	.333	.327	**.893**	1.2	1.0	.4	.0	**.5**	5.5
**Career**	8 years, 6 teams	288	160	22.1	.359	.326	.848	2.3	1.5	.5	.1	1.2	8.4
**Career**	All-Star	1	1	17.3	.500	.375	—	2.0	.0	1.0	.0	.0	15.0

==== Playoffs ====
WNBA playoff statistics
Year	Team	GP	GS	MPG	FG%	3P%	FT%	RPG	APG	SPG	BPG	TO	PPG
2021	Phoenix	6	6	21.8	.432	.455	1.000	3.3	1.5	.2	.0	.7	8.3
**Career**	1 year, 1 team	6	6	21.8	.432	.455	1.000	3.3	1.5	.2	.0	.7	8.3

=== College ===
NCAA statistics
Year	Team	GP	GS	MPG	FG%	3P%	FT%	RPG	APG	SPG	BPG	TO	PPG
2014–15*	Connecticut	**39**	36	25.0	.485	.407	.721	3.1	2.7	**1.4**	.1	1.5	10.2
2015–16*	Connecticut	38	**38**	28.3	.442	.369	.753	1.9	2.7	1.3	.1	1.3	9.3
2016–17	Connecticut	33	33	30.6	.480	**.462**	**.855**	2.0	**3.8**	1.0	.1	1.5	12.7
2017–18	Connecticut	33	33	**33.1**	**.519**	.442	.809	**3.5**	2.7	1.2	**.3**	**1.2**	**13.5**
**Career**		147	144	30.6	.483	.423	.784	2.6	3.0	1.2	.1	1.4	11.4

== Personal life ==
Kia Nurse was born to Richard and Cathy Nurse and was raised in Hamilton, Ontario. Richard Nurse played in the CFL, and Cathy Nurse was a basketball player at McMaster University. Her older siblings are Tamika Nurse, who played basketball for Oregon and Bowling Green, and NHL defenceman Darnell Nurse of the San Jose Sharks. Her cousin is PWHL forward Sarah Nurse, who plays for the Vancouver Goldeneyes and was part of the gold medal-winning Team Canada at the 2022 Winter Olympics in Beijing. She is also the niece of former Philadelphia Eagles quarterback Donovan McNabb, who is married to her aunt Raquel Nurse McNabb.

Sporting positions
Preceded by Tyler Scaife (Rutgers)	AAC Freshman of the year 2015	Succeeded by Kitija Laksa (South Florida)
