= Timeline of the WNBA =

Organizational history of the WNBA

The following is a timeline of organizational changes in the Women's National Basketball Association (WNBA), a women's professional basketball league in the United States that began play in 1997 with 8 teams and now comprises 15 teams (scheduled to expand to 18 by 2030). This article includes expansions, contractions, and relocations.

== Timeline ==
Current member Former member Relocated member Future member

== Summary ==
WNBA expansion and contraction
Season(s)	No. of teams
1997	8
1998	10
1999	12
2000–2002	16
2003	14
2004–2005	13
2006	14
2007	13
2008	14
2009	13
2010–2024	12
2025	13
2026–2027	15
2028	16
2029	17
2030	18

=== Relocated teams ===
- Orlando Miracle (1999–2002) – relocated to Connecticut, to become the Connecticut Sun (2003–2026), relocating to Houston, to become the Houston Comets in 2027.
- Utah Starzz (1997–2002) – relocated to San Antonio to become the San Antonio Silver Stars (2003–2013), rebranded as the San Antonio Stars (2014–2017), and relocated again to Paradise, Nevada, to become the Las Vegas Aces (2018–present)
- Detroit Shock (1998–2009) – relocated to Tulsa, Oklahoma, to become the Tulsa Shock (2010–2015) and then to Arlington, Texas, to become the Dallas Wings (2016–present)

=== Folded teams ===
- Charlotte Sting – 1997–2006
- Cleveland Rockers – 1997–2003
- Miami Sol – 2000–2002
- Sacramento Monarchs – 1997–2009

== 1997–2002: Early years ==
=== 1997: Inaugural season (8 teams) ===
The league operated its inaugural season in 1997 with eight teams split into two conferences.

1997 WNBA teams
Eastern	Western
Charlotte Sting	Los Angeles Sparks
Cleveland Rockers	Phoenix Mercury
Houston Comets	Sacramento Monarchs
New York Liberty	Utah Starzz

=== 1998: First expansion (10 teams) ===
- The Detroit Shock and Washington Mystics were added and placed in the Eastern Conference.
- The Houston Comets moved to the Western Conference.

Team's first season in the WNBA *	Team switched conferences ‡

1998 WNBA teams
Eastern	Western
Charlotte Sting	Houston Comets ‡
Cleveland Rockers	Los Angeles Sparks
Detroit Shock *	Phoenix Mercury
New York Liberty	Sacramento Monarchs
Washington Mystics *	Utah Starzz

=== 1999: Second expansion (12 teams) ===
- The Minnesota Lynx and Orlando Miracle were added.
- The Miracle were placed in the Eastern Conference, while the Lynx were placed in the Western Conference.

Team's first season in the WNBA *

1999 WNBA teams
Eastern	Western
Charlotte Sting	Houston Comets
Cleveland Rockers	Los Angeles Sparks
Detroit Shock	Minnesota Lynx *
New York Liberty	Phoenix Mercury
Orlando Miracle *	Sacramento Monarchs
Washington Mystics	Utah Starzz

=== 2000–2001: Third expansion (16 teams) ===
- The Indiana Fever, Miami Sol, Portland Fire, and Seattle Storm were added.
- The Fever and the Sol were placed in the Eastern Conference, while the Fire and the Storm were placed in the Western Conference.

Team's first season in the WNBA (2000) *

2000 to 2001 WNBA teams
Eastern	Western
Charlotte Sting	Houston Comets
Cleveland Rockers	Los Angeles Sparks
Detroit Shock	Minnesota Lynx
Indiana Fever *	Phoenix Mercury
Miami Sol *	Portland Fire *
New York Liberty	Sacramento Monarchs
Orlando Miracle	Seattle Storm *
Washington Mystics	Utah Starzz

=== 2002: Miami and Portland fold (16 teams) ===
- The Miami Sol and Portland Fire folded after the season.

Team folded after the season †

2002 WNBA season
Eastern	Western
Charlotte Sting	Houston Comets
Cleveland Rockers	Los Angeles Sparks
Detroit Shock	Minnesota Lynx
Indiana Fever	Phoenix Mercury
Miami Sol †	Portland Fire †
New York Liberty	Sacramento Monarchs
Orlando Miracle	Seattle Storm
Washington Mystics	Utah Starzz

== 2003–2009: Contraction ==
=== 2003: Orlando and Utah relocate, Cleveland folds (14 teams) ===
- The Orlando Miracle relocated to Connecticut to become the Connecticut Sun.
- The Utah Starzz relocated to San Antonio to become the San Antonio Silver Stars.
- The Cleveland Rockers folded after the season.

Team folded after the season †

2003 WNBA season
Eastern	Western
Charlotte Sting	Houston Comets
Connecticut Sun	Los Angeles Sparks
Cleveland Rockers †	Minnesota Lynx
Detroit Shock	Phoenix Mercury
Indiana Fever	Sacramento Monarchs
New York Liberty	San Antonio Silver Stars
Washington Mystics	Seattle Storm

=== 2004–2005 (13 teams) ===
2004 to 2005 WNBA season
Eastern	Western
Charlotte Sting	Houston Comets
Connecticut Sun	Los Angeles Sparks
Detroit Shock	Minnesota Lynx
Indiana Fever	Phoenix Mercury
New York Liberty	Sacramento Monarchs
Washington Mystics	San Antonio Silver Stars
	Seattle Storm

=== 2006: Chicago added and Charlotte folds (14 teams) ===
- The Chicago Sky was added and placed in the Eastern Conference.
- The Charlotte Sting folded after the season.

Team's first season in the WNBA *	Team folded after the season †

2006 WNBA season
Eastern	Western
Charlotte Sting †	Houston Comets
Chicago Sky *	Los Angeles Sparks
Connecticut Sun	Minnesota Lynx
Detroit Shock	Phoenix Mercury
Indiana Fever	Sacramento Monarchs
New York Liberty	San Antonio Silver Stars
Washington Mystics	Seattle Storm

=== 2007 (13 teams) ===
2007 WNBA season
Eastern	Western
Chicago Sky	Houston Comets
Connecticut Sun	Los Angeles Sparks
Detroit Shock	Minnesota Lynx
Indiana Fever	Phoenix Mercury
New York Liberty	Sacramento Monarchs
Washington Mystics	San Antonio Silver Stars
	Seattle Storm

=== 2008: Atlanta added and Houston folds (14 teams) ===
- The Atlanta Dream was added and placed in the Eastern Conference.
- The Houston Comets folded after the season.

Team's first season in the WNBA *	Team folded after the season †

2008 WNBA season
Eastern	Western
Atlanta Dream *	Houston Comets †
Chicago Sky	Los Angeles Sparks
Connecticut Sun	Minnesota Lynx
Detroit Shock	Phoenix Mercury
Indiana Fever	Sacramento Monarchs
New York Liberty	San Antonio Silver Stars
Washington Mystics	Seattle Storm

=== 2009: Sacramento folds (13 teams) ===
- The Sacramento Monarchs folded after the season.

Team folded after the season †

2009 WNBA season
Eastern	Western
Atlanta Dream	Los Angeles Sparks
Chicago Sky	Minnesota Lynx
Connecticut Sun	Phoenix Mercury
Detroit Shock	Sacramento Monarchs †
Indiana Fever	San Antonio Silver Stars
New York Liberty	Seattle Storm
Washington Mystics	

== 2010–2024: Relocations ==
=== 2010: Detroit relocates (12 teams) ===
- The Detroit Shock relocated to Tulsa, Oklahoma to become the Tulsa Shock and moved to the Western Conference.

Team switched conferences ‡

2010 to 2013 WNBA season
Eastern	Western
Atlanta Dream	Los Angeles Sparks
Chicago Sky	Minnesota Lynx
Connecticut Sun	Phoenix Mercury
Indiana Fever	San Antonio Silver Stars
New York Liberty	Seattle Storm
Washington Mystics	Tulsa Shock ‡

=== 2014: San Antonio rebrands (12 teams) ===
- The San Antonio Silver Stars rebranded as the San Antonio Stars.

2014 to 2015 WNBA season
Eastern	Western
Atlanta Dream	Los Angeles Sparks
Chicago Sky	Minnesota Lynx
Connecticut Sun	Phoenix Mercury
Indiana Fever	San Antonio Stars
New York Liberty	Seattle Storm
Washington Mystics	Tulsa Shock

=== 2016: Tulsa relocates (12 teams) ===
- The Tulsa Shock relocated to Arlington, Texas to become the Dallas Wings.

2016 to 2017 WNBA season
Eastern	Western
Atlanta Dream	Dallas Wings
Chicago Sky	Los Angeles Sparks
Connecticut Sun	Minnesota Lynx
Indiana Fever	Phoenix Mercury
New York Liberty	San Antonio Stars
Washington Mystics	Seattle Storm

=== 2018: San Antonio relocates (12 teams) ===
- The San Antonio Stars relocated to Paradise, Nevada to become the Las Vegas Aces.

2018 to 2024 WNBA season
Eastern	Western
Atlanta Dream	Dallas Wings
Chicago Sky	Las Vegas Aces
Connecticut Sun	Los Angeles Sparks
Indiana Fever	Minnesota Lynx
New York Liberty	Phoenix Mercury
Washington Mystics	Seattle Storm

== 2025–future: Expansion era ==
=== 2025: Golden State added (13 teams) ===
- The Golden State Valkyries were added and placed in the Western Conference.

Team's first season in the WNBA *

2025 WNBA season
Eastern	Western
Atlanta Dream	Dallas Wings
Chicago Sky	Golden State Valkyries *
Connecticut Sun	Las Vegas Aces
Indiana Fever	Los Angeles Sparks
New York Liberty	Minnesota Lynx
Washington Mystics	Phoenix Mercury
	Seattle Storm

=== 2026: Portland and Toronto added (15 teams) ===
- Portland Fire and Toronto Tempo were added.
- The Fire were placed in the Western Conference, while the Tempo were placed in the Eastern Conference.

Team's first season in the WNBA *

2026 WNBA season
Eastern	Western
Atlanta Dream	Dallas Wings
Chicago Sky	Golden State Valkyries
Connecticut Sun	Las Vegas Aces
Indiana Fever	Los Angeles Sparks
New York Liberty	Minnesota Lynx
Toronto Tempo *	Phoenix Mercury
Washington Mystics	Portland Fire *
	Seattle Storm

=== 2027: Connecticut Sun moving to Houston (15 teams) ===
In March 2026, it was reported that the Connecticut Sun were sold to the Fertitta family, owners of the Houston Rockets, for $300 million, who would move the team to Houston, previously home to the Houston Comets.

=== 2028–2030: Cleveland, Detroit, and Philadelphia to be added (18 teams) ===
On June 30, 2025, the WNBA announced that it would expand to Cleveland (2028), Detroit (2029), and Philadelphia (2030), bringing the total to 18 teams. Cleveland and Detroit previously were WNBA markets.

==== Background ====
The WNBA's exponential growth and popularity in recent years has led to rising expansion fees. The Golden State Valkyries, the league’s 13th franchise that began play in May 2025, paid $50 million to join, while the Toronto Tempo and Portland Fire — the 14th and 15th franchises scheduled to begin play in 2026 — paid $115 million and $125 million, respectively.

The deadline for the next expansion bids was January 30, 2025. At the time, the bids were believed to be for a 16th expansion team. League commissioner Cathy Engelbert had said she was aiming to have the league expand to 16 teams by 2028. However, as expansion fees continued to rise, the league rethought its original plan of adding just one more expansion team. Each new team will pay $250 million in franchise fees to join the league.

==== Cleveland Sirens ====
Cleveland was previously home to the Rockers, one of the WNBA’s original eight members when the league began play in 1997. However, the franchise folded after the 2003 season when former owner Gordon Gund could not sell the team due to tumbling revenue and erratic attendance.

The new team will play at Rocket Arena, home of the National Basketball Association's (NBA) Cleveland Cavaliers. On August 4, 2026, the team's name was revealed as the Cleveland Sirens.

==== Detroit ====
Detroit was previously home to the Shock, one of the WNBA’s first expansion teams when it began play in 1998. Between 1998 and 2009, the Shock won three WNBA championships. However, the team’s low fan attendance led the franchise to relocate to Tulsa, Oklahoma, in 2009, where it played until 2015. The franchise moved again in 2015, to Arlington, Texas, and are now called the Dallas Wings.

The new team will play at Little Caesars Arena, home of the NBA's Detroit Pistons. The WNBA coincidentally filed a trademark application for the name “Detroit Shock” the same day Tom Gores, owner of the Pistons, submitted his offer for a WNBA expansion team, a potential sign of the league’s intentions to revive the team name.

==== Philadelphia ====
Philadelphia 76ers owner Josh Harris of Harris Blitzer Sports & Entertainment (HBSE), which also owns the New Jersey Devils of the National Hockey League (NHL), submitted a bid for an expansion team. When Harris partnered with Comcast on a new arena in South Philadelphia, the priority was to house a WNBA team along with the NBA's Philadelphia 76ers and the NHL's Philadelphia Flyers.

== See also ==
- List of WNBA seasons
- Timeline of women's basketball
