= Cleveland Sirens =

Future Women's National Basketball Association team in Ohio, US

- Conference: Eastern
- League: WNBA
- Founded: June 30, 2025; 13 months ago
- Arena: Rocket Arena
- Capacity: 19,432
- Location: Cleveland, Ohio
- Team colors: Sirens blue, Erie blue, black, mint foam, white
- Main sponsor: Progressive Insurance, KeyBank, Cleveland Clinic
- CEO: Nic Barlage
- Chairman: Dan Gilbert
- President: Allison Howard
- Ownership: Dan Gilbert
- Website: clevelandsirens.com

The Cleveland Sirens are an American professional basketball team based in Cleveland. Established in 2025, the team will compete in the Women's National Basketball Association (WNBA) and is scheduled to begin play in 2028. The team is owned by Dan Gilbert, who also owns the Cleveland Cavaliers, and will play its home games at Rocket Arena. The franchise will be the second WNBA team in the city's history, following the Cleveland Rockers, a charter member of the WNBA in the late 1990s and early 2000s. The name Sirens comes from the mythical creature of the same name.

== History ==
The Cleveland Rockers were Cleveland's first Women's National Basketball Association (WNBA) team, playing from the league's establishment in 1997 until 2003, when the Gund family decided to not continue operating the team. With no local ownership to be found, the Rockers officially ceased operations in December 2003.

In February 2025, it was reported that Cleveland would likely get a WNBA expansion franchise for the 2028 season; said franchise would be owned by Dan Gilbert (owner of the NBA's Cleveland Cavaliers, G League's Cleveland Charge and AHL's Cleveland Monsters) under his Rock Entertainment Group, would join the Cavaliers and Monsters at Rocket Arena and would move into the Cavaliers' practice facility in Independence when the Cavs' new practice facility, the Cleveland Clinic Global Peak Performance Center, was completed. As the WNBA considered Cleveland for an expansion franchise, it helped to arrange conversations between the Mohegan Tribe, owners of the Connecticut Sun and Gilbert about selling the Sun to his group and relocating the team to Cleveland. This was proposed as an alternative to Cleveland getting an expansion franchise. Gilbert and the Mohegan Tribe could not come to an agreement, reportedly due to the sale price of the Sun.

Cleveland was awarded the WNBA's 16th franchise on June 30, 2025, to begin play in the 2028 season; on the same day the 17th franchise was awarded to Detroit to begin play in 2029 and the 18th to Philadelphia to begin play in 2030.

It was reported on July 12, 2025 that the WNBA no longer owned the trademark to the "Cleveland Rockers" name. According to records from the United States Patent and Trademark Office, the name was officially registered to Ryan Reed, owner and president of the Women's Basketball League, in October 2024.

On August 4, 2026, the WNBA announced that the franchise's identity and name would be the Cleveland Sirens. The name pays homage to Lake Erie.
