= Detroit WNBA team =

Future Women's National Basketball Association team based in Detroit

- Conference: Eastern
- League: WNBA
- Founded: June 30, 2025; 15 months ago
- Arena: Little Caesars Arena
- Capacity: 20,332
- Location: Detroit, Michigan
- Ownership: Tom Gores
- Website: www.wnba.com/detroit

The Detroit WNBA team is an American professional basketball team based in Detroit. Established in 2025, the team will compete in the Women's National Basketball Association (WNBA) and is scheduled to begin play in 2029. The team is owned by Tom Gores, who also owns the Detroit Pistons, and will play its home games at Little Caesars Arena. The franchise will be the second WNBA team in the city's history, following the Detroit Shock.

== History ==
The Women's National Basketball Association (WNBA) previously had a Detroit-based team in the Detroit Shock, a team founded in 1998 that competed until 2009 and won three league championships. The team relocated to Tulsa, Oklahoma, after the 2009 season, becoming the Tulsa Shock, which then relocated after the 2015 season to become the Dallas Wings.

In January 2025, Tom Gores, owner of the NBA's Detroit Pistons, along with a group of local investors including Chris Webber, Jared Goff and Grant Hill, submitted a formal bid for Detroit to receive a WNBA expansion franchise.

On June 30, Detroit was announced as one of three cities to receive new WNBA teams, along with Cleveland and Philadelphia. Cleveland is scheduled to begin play in 2028, Detroit in 2029, and Philadelphia in 2030. The Detroit team will play at Little Caesars Arena, the home of the Pistons.

On July 12, it was reported that the WNBA no longer owned the trademark to the "Detroit Shock" name. According to records from the United States Patent and Trademark Office, the name was officially registered to Ryan Reed, owner and president of the Women's Basketball League, who acquired the trademark after the WNBA let it lapse after the team relocated to Tulsa. In February 2025. Reed stated that he was in talks about potentially relinquishing the trademark back to the WNBA.

On April 9, 2026, the WNBA and NBA Board of Governors officially approved expansion teams in Detroit, Cleveland, and Philadelphia.
