= Deitre Collins =

American volleyball player (born 1962)

Personal information
- Born: March 3, 1962 (age 63); Los Angeles, California, U.S.

Sport
- Sport: Volleyball

Deitre Collins (born March 3, 1962) is an American volleyball coach and former player. She competed in the women's tournament at the 1988 Summer Olympics. While at Hawai'i, she won the Broderick Award (now the Honda Sports Award) as the nation's top collegiate volleyball player in both 1983 and 1984.

Collins played professionally in Italy and France, winning two French League titles. After retiring as a player in 1992, she began her coaching career. She was hired as an assistant at Houston under Bill Walton in 1993, and subsequently served the same role at Northern Arizona and South Alabama. Collins accepted her first head coaching position at UNLV in 1996, where she spent eight seasons. She had further head coaching stints at Cornell and San Diego State before joining the Coastal Carolina staff as an associate head coach in 2021. Collins joined the Arizona staff as an assistant coach for the 2023 season. In December 2023, it was announced that she was hired as an assistant coach for the San Diego Mojo of the Pro Volleyball Federation ahead of its inaugural 2024 season.
