= UCF Knights women's volleyball =

American college volleyball team

- Founded: 1975
- University: University of Central Florida
- Head coach: Matt Botsford (2nd season)
- Conference: Big 12
- Location: Orlando, Florida, US
- Home arena: The Venue at UCF (capacity: 2,500)
- Nickname: UCF Knights
- Colors: Black and gold

AIAW/NCAA tournament champion
- 1978*

AIAW/NCAA tournament runner-up
- 1979*

AIAW/NCAA tournament semifinal
- 1977*, 1978*, 1979*

AIAW/NCAA Regional Final
- 1977*, 1978*, 1979*

AIAW/NCAA tournament appearance
- 1977*, 1978*, 1979*, 1994, 1995, 1996, 1997, 2001, 2002, 2003, 2014, 2018, 2019, 2020, 2021, 2022 *at Division II level

Conference tournament champion
- 1986, 1987, 1993, 1994, 1995, 1996, 1997, 2001, 2002, 2003, 2018, 2019, 2020

Conference regular season champion
- 1999, 2001, 2002, 2003, 2014, 2018, 2020, 2021, 2022

The UCF Knights women's volleyball program represents the University of Central Florida in National Collegiate Athletic Association (NCAA) Division I. The Knights compete in the Big 12 Conference and play their home games on UCF's main campus in Orlando, Florida at The Venue at UCF. The Knights are currently led by head coach Matt Botsford.

UCF Volleyball has earned one national title (the 1978 AIAW National Championship), going 55–0 in their championship season. The Knights have won twenty-two conference tournament and regular season championships, and have made eighteen post-season appearances in the NCAA, AIAW, and NIVC tournaments. Ten UCF Volleyball players have earned various All-American honors, including: Laura Smith, DeLaina Sarden, Angelica Crump, Jade Hayes, and McKenna Melville.

== History ==
=== The Lucy McDaniel Era ===
The Florida Technological University (FTU) Knights volleyball program began in 1975 under Head Coach Lucy McDaniel, who would lead the team through the 1979 season. The Knights would play as an Independent until 1982. FTU would change its name to the University of Central Florida (UCF) in December, 1978. McDaniel, a graduate of Florida State University, would be a strong advocate for the use of Title IX laws for equal access for women to expand the opportunities for female athletes at the collegiate level, and also helped to push the NCAA to recognize Women's Volleyball as a collegiate sport. She would go on to become the first donor in the state of Florida to donate $1 million to women's collegiate athletics programs.

The Knights homecourt was the Education Gym, located in the Education Building on the then FTU (later UCF) Campus. This would remain their homecourt until 1991, when they began playing games at the original UCF arena. In 2007, a new UCF arena opened (later to be called CFE, then Additions Financial Arena). UCF Volleyball played their games for one year in that arena while renovations were made to the old arena to develop it into a volleyball specific facility. In 2008, the Knights returned to the old arena, now re-christened as "the Venue" (which remains UCF's home volleyball arena to the present day).

The Knights went 30–8–0 in their inaugural year, with much of their success due to a balance of equally strong offense and defense, and a strong bond between the players. McDaniel was described by her players as "tough, but fair", and they credited her leadership as the bond that held the team together through adversity. In 1977, the Knights made their first post-season tournament appearance, placing 4th in the Association for Intercollegiate Athletics for Women (AIAW) National Championship Tournament. (the AIAW was the sponsoring body for women's collegiate athletics that were not yet recognized by the NCAA)

==== 1978 National Championship season ====
The highlight of McDaniel's tenure at UCF was their 1978 perfect 55–0 season in which they won the Division II AIAW National Championship.

During the 55–0 run that season, UCF played opponents all along the U.S. east coast (including schools like Princeton), defeating most opponents by a large margin. As former UCF player Terri Owen described it, "she (Coach McDaniel) was taking us all along the east coast, and we were kicking everyboy's but." Out of 117 sets played in their 55–0 run that season, the Knights only lost 7 sets.

The Knights greatest loss that year was not on the volleyball court. One of their Assistant Coaches (and former player), Julie Gonzalez, was killed in a car accident during the course of the season. McDaniel was grooming Gonzalez to be her successor as head coach, and the loss of Gonzalez forced McDaniel to adjust her plans for the future.

During the course of the season, the university transitioned from FTU to UCF, but the players were reluctant to embrace the change. "We didn't like it at all," said UCF player Aggie McHugh. Despite their misgivings, the players finally came around to the change, which would go into effect around the time they started post-season play. When they started the 1978 AIAW championship tournament, they decided they would begin the tournament as FTU, then make the change to UCF at the end of the tournament.

They defeated the UC Riverside Highlanders in the semi-final, and advanced to the tournament final. As the highest seeded team in the tournament, UCF hosted the final game on their home court. The Knights faced the University of Hawaii at Hilo Vulcans in the final match. The Vulcans were led by Head Coach Sharon Peterson, who would go on to coach the Vulcans until 2002, and would lead them to two National Championships. Amongst the Hawaii-Hilo players who took the court to face the Knights was future All-American Edie Manzano. The final was a best of three sets match, with each team playing to at least 15 points (the winner having to win by two points). The Knights triumphed over the Vulcans two sets to three (Set 1: 13-15 Hawaii; Set 2: 15-10 UCF; Set 3: 15-7 UCF), securing the 1978 National Championship.

The following year, the Knights would once again advanced to the AIAW Tournament Championship match with a record of 54–5, and would once again face the Hawaii-Hilo Vulcans in the final match. But the 1979 Championship would go to the Vulcans, who avenged their loss from the previous year. Lucy McDaniel would leave UCF at the end of that season. In 2006, she was inducted into the UCF Athletics Hall of Fame. Lucy McDaniel passed away in 2013. The 1978 volleyball team was inducted as a whole into the UCF Athletics Hall of Fame in 2015.

=== The Lyn King Era ===
In 1980, Carmen Pennick took over the UCF Volleyball program, and would lead the Knights for the next-two years. However, she failed to produce a winning season during her tenure, and was replaced by Lyn King as Head Coach in 1982. During that same year, the Knights joined the Sunshine State Conference (their first conference affiliation). The Knights returned to a winning record in 1982, and would go 38-12 the following season (10–2 in conference play for both seasons). UCF left the Sunshine State Conference and returned to Independent status for the 1984 season before joining the New South Women's Athletic Conference in 1985. In 1986, Coach King would lead the Knights to their first Conference Tournament Championship, the first of back-to-back league titles.

=== The Laura Smith Era ===
In 1988, Dee Dee McClemmon took over as Head Coach of the Knights, and led them into the American South Conference in 1990. Her tenure with the Knights was marked by inconsistent performance, with only one winning season under her leadership in 1989.

In 1991, McClemmon was replaced by Laura Smith, a UCF volleyball alum who played for the Knights from 1977 to 1979. She would lead the Knights for the next seven seasons, and oversee their transition first into the Sun Belt Conference in 1991, then into the Trans America Athletic Conference (later re-christened the Atlantic-Sun Conference) in 1992. During her tenure as UCF's Head Coach, Smith would lead the Knights to six consecutive Conference Tournament Championships, and would not loose a single conference match during that six-year run (a 65 match conference win streak). She would also lead them to their first NCAA Tournament appearance in 1994, the first of four consecutive NCAA Tournament appearances. Their overall record during her time as coach was 164–61.

=== The Meg Colado Era ===
Laura Smith stepped down as Head Coach at the end of the 1997 season, and was replaced with Miriam Ochoa. The latter would only lead UCF Volleyball for one year, as the Knights posted their first losing record in nine seasons in 1998. Meg Colado (a former standout player at the University of Florida) took over the helm as Head Coach in 1999, and would remain with the program until the end of the 2007 season. During her nine years with UCF, Colado led the Knights to three consecutive 20+ win seasons from 2001 to 2003. Earning NCAA tournament births during each of those three seasons, the Knights made their first appearance in the second round of the tournament in 2003. In 2005, UCF joined Conference-USA, but the Knights would not find early success in their new conference. In Colado's final four years with UCF, the Knights posted four consecutive below-500 seasons, with only 5 wins in the 2006 season.

=== The Todd Dagenais Era ===
In 2008, Todd Dagenais took over the UCF Knights Volleyball program as Head Coach. Dagenais had been a part of the 2004 U.S. Women's National Volleyball Team coaching staff that competed in the 2004 Olympics in Athens, and had been an Assistant Coach at USC and Michigan State. He would return to the USA coaching staff as an assistant in 2016 during the Knights' off-season. Dagenais would go on to lead the Knights for the next 15 seasons (the longest tenured Head Coach in UCF Volleyball history). In 2011, Dagenais led the Knights to their first winning record since 2003, and would post winning records for UCF's final two years in Conference-USA.

In 2013, UCF moved into the American Athletic Conference, and began a period of dominance in their new league. During the Knights' ten seasons in the American Conference, UCF won six conference titles, including five straight from 2018 to 2022, and made the NCAA Tournament six times. The Knights advanced to the second round of the tournament in three of their six tournament appearances. They also made the second round of the National Invitational Volleyball Championship (NIVC) Tournament in 2017. Dagenais earned more wins than any other coach in the conference during that period, and was named the American Conference Volleyball Coach of the Year four times. UCF's overall record during their ten years in the conference was 227-82 (142–38 in conference play). This included two seasons which saw the Knights go undefeated in conference play (2018, 2020), and two seasons where they only lost once conference match (2021, 2022). Dagenais became UCF's winningest head coach following a victory over Florida State in the first round of the NCAA Volleyball Tournament in 2019.

A major contributor on the court to the Knights' success during this period was Outside Hitter McKenna Melville, who would go on to become the most decorated player in the history of UCF Volleyball. During her five seasons with the Knights, she (along with her teammate Amber Olson) became the only players in UCF history to win five conference championships in their sport. In 2022, Melville led the nation in kills (573 total), and also led the nation in kills per set (5.51) and points per set (6.12). She earned four 500 plus kill seasons at UCF, and would end her UCF career with 2,563 kills (#1 all time at UCF; #8 in NCAA Volleyball history; #2 in the 25-point rally scoring era of NCAA Volleyball). She is one of only ten players in NCAA history with at least 2,500 career kills. By the end of her time with UCF Volleyball, Melville would be named AVCA First Team All-American in 2022, Third Team All-American in 2021, and would receive Honorable Mention nods in 2018 and 2019. She also finished in the top ten of UCF records in career defensive digs (1,650), service aces (123), and in solo blocks (66). Melville was unanimously selected the American Athletic Conference Player of the Year three times in a row (2020, 2021, 2022). Upon completion of her collegiate career, Melville was offered the opportunity to play in the new Pro Volleyball Federation league (later Major League Volleyball), but turned down the offer. Instead, she chose to return home to her native Eagan, Minnesota, to replace her mother as the Eagan High School Volleyball Coach.

=== Transition to the Big 12 ===
Todd Dagenais retired from college coaching after the 2022 season to Coach the Atlanta Vibe in the new Pro Volleyball Federation (later Major League Volleyball). Despite his departure from UCF, Dagenais has still maintained a presence with the Knights program, regularly attending UCF home volleyball games. UCF decided to promote from within when choosing new leadership, and replaced Dagenais with his former Associate Head Coach, Jenny Maurer. The latter had been a part of the Knights success over the previous several years, including the recruitment of players like McKenna Melville into the program.

The Knights joined the Big 12 Conference starting with the 2023 season. Their first season in the league started out with success, as the Knights won 17 of their first 21 matches. The Knights won their first seven conference matches, including a dramatic five-set home win over Kansas State. But the 2023 season quickly came unraveled as they lost their last eight matches, and finished the season 8–10 in league play (17–12 overall). They also did not qualify for the NCAA Tournament, the first time in seven years they had not made the post-season.

UCF started the season strong in 2024, winning seven of their first eight matches. But the Knights would only win two more matches that season, finishing the year with their worst record since 2007 (9–18 overall, 2–15 in conference play). Maurer was fired at the end of the 2024 season.

Matt Botsford, a successful coach at Florida Gulf Coast University, was hired to take over the Knights starting in the 2025 season. Under Botsford's leadership, the Knights returned to a winning record, finishing the 2025 season 17–12 overall (8–10 in conference play). This included a road win over the #17 ranked BYU Cougars, with the Cougars losing only their 16th home match in the previous 11 seasons. The Knights also earned a home sweep over the #24 ranked Iowa State Cyclones. A major contributor to this success was Outside Hitter Avah Armour, who was named an AVCA All-American Honorable Mention and First Team All-Big 12 Conference. She earned 457 kills and 513 points on the season (the 12th player in Knights history to pass the 500 point total). UCF just barely missed out on an NCAA Tournament berth for the season.

== Championships and Post Season Tournaments ==
National Championships
Year	Championship	Record	Head Coach	Championship Game
1978	AIAW National Championship	55-0	Lucy McDaniel	UCF 2, Hawaii-Hilo 1

Conference Regular Season Championships
Year	Conference	Head Coach	Regular Season Conference Record
1999	Atlantic Sun Conference	Meg Collado	9-0
2001	Atlantic Sun Conference	Meg Collado	9-1
2002	Atlantic Sun Conference	Meg Collado	10-1
2003	Atlantic Sun Conference	Meg Collado	10-0
2014	American Athletic Conference	Todd Dagenais	18-2
2018	American Athletic Conference	Todd Dagenais	18-0
2020	American Athletic Conference	Todd Dagenais	8-0
2021	American Athletic Conference	Todd Dagenais	19-1
2022	American Athletic Conference	Todd Dagenais	19-1

- Note: The 2020 Season was abbreviated due to the COVID-19 Pandemic.

Conference Tournament Championships
Year	Conference	Head Coach
1986	New South Women's Athletic Conference	Lyn King
1987	New South Women's Athletic Conference	Lyn King
1993	Atlantic Sun Conference	Laura Smith
1994	Atlantic Sun Conference	Laura Smith
1995	Atlantic Sun Conference	Laura Smith
1996	Atlantic Sun Conference	Laura Smith
1997	Atlantic Sun Conference	Laura Smith
2001	Atlantic Sun Conference	Meg Colado
2002	Atlantic Sun Conference	Meg Colado
2003	Atlantic Sun Conference	Meg Colado
2018	American Athletic Conference	Todd Dagenais
2019	American Athletic Conference	Todd Dagenais
2020	American Athletic Conference	Todd Dagenais

AIAW/NCAA Tournaments
Year	Tournament	Head Coach	Performance
1977	AIAW Tournament	Lucy McDaniel	Fourth Place
1978	AIAW Tournament	Lucy McDaniel	Tournament Champion
1979	AIAW Tournament	Lucy McDaniel	Tournament Runner-Up
1994	NCAA Tournament	Laura Smith	First Round
1995	NCAA Tournament	Laura Smith	First Round
1996	NCAA Tournament	Laura Smith	First Round
1997	NCAA Tournament	Laura Smith	First Round
2001	NCAA Tournament	Meg Colado	First Round
2002	NCAA Tournament	Meg Colado	First Round
2003	NCAA Tournament	Meg Colado	Second Round
2014	NCAA Tournament	Todd Dagenais	First Round
2018	NCAA Tournament	Todd Dagenais	First Round
2019	NCAA Tournament	Todd Dagenais	Second Round
2020	NCAA Tournament	Todd Dagenais	First Round
2021	NCAA Tournament	Todd Dagenais	Second Round
2023	NCAA Tournament	Todd Dagenais	Second Round

NIVC Tournament
Year	Head Coach	Performance
1993	Laura Smith	First Round
2017	Todd Dagenais	Second Round

== Rivalries ==
=== University of Cincinnati ===
The UCF Knights and the University of Cincinnati Bearcats have been rivals going back to their days in the American Athletic Conference, with matches between the two teams often deciding who would play for or win conference titles. One of the biggest moments in the rivalry came in the 2019 American Athletic Conference Volleyball Tournament Final, played on UCF's home court. The Bearcats took Set One 25–21 before the Knights stormed back by taking Sets Two and Three 25-16 and 26-24 respectively. Cincinnati did not back down, however, and came back to win Set Four 26–24, forcing a fifth and final set to determine the tournament championship. The Knights secured the win, and the championship, in a 15–10 victory that led to a court storm from the home crowd (including the UCF Women's Basketball Team who watched the last few sets after playing a home basketball game). The rivalry transitioned into the Big 12 Conference, which both teams joined in 2023. The competitive nature of the rivalry has continued in the Big 12 as well, with the Knights and Bearcats even at 3–3 in Big 12 play against each other as of the end of the 2025 season. The Knights are 19-10 all time against the Bearcats.

=== University of South Florida-the War on I-4 ===
The UCF Knights have had a long time rivalry with the University of South Florida Bulls, whose campus is 90 miles from Orlando in Tampa. This rivalry, known as "the War on I-4" (named for the interstate highway that connects Orlando and Tampa), has encompassed all sports played by both schools. The two universities' volleyball teams first met each other in 1979, and played each other most years in non-conference matchups between 1979 and 2013. The Knights won the first four matches in the rivalry, and six out of seven of the meetings between the two teams in the early years. After that, the Bulls came to dominate the series for most of the next three decades, including a 10-game winning streak against the Knights in the 1980s.

When the Knights joined the Bulls in the American Athletic Conference in 2013, the Knights were able to turn the table on their in-state rivals. The Knights won 20-straight matches against the Bulls, with UCF never losing a conference matchup to South Florida during the ten years both were in the American Conference. Fourteen of those twenty victories saw the Knights sweep the Bulls in straight sets, including the final seven matches they played against each other as conference foes between 2019 and 2022.

When UCF and South Florida were both members of the American Athletic Conference, both schools developed an all sports "War on I-4" trophy that would be awarded to one of the two schools on an annual basis based on their head-to-head record in all sports played that year.

As UCF moved into the Big 12 Conference in 2023, the rivalry went dormant as the Knights and Bulls have not scheduled matches against each other since that time. No matches are planned between the two rivals in the near future, due in part to scheduling conflicts for both programs. Another reason is the dominance that the Knights had over the Bulls during their days in the American conference. This has convinced the UCF leadership that scheduling non-conference matchups with South Florida would not benefit their strength of schedule, and instead the Knights should seek non-conference matchups with better quality opponents to improve their Ratings Percentage Index (RPI) numbers for NCAA Tournament qualification.

The all-time record between the two programs is a matter of dispute. South Florida claims an all-time record of 43–38 against the Knights, but UCF claims there are matches and results that are not recorded in the Bulls' records that would give UCF a head-to-head advantage.

=== Florida State University ===
UCF's rivalry with the Florida State Seminoles is a more recent development in the story of both programs. The first meeting between the two teams occurred in Orlando in 2016, with the Seminoles sweeping the Knights 3–0 on the latter's home court. The rivalry really came to fruition in 2019, when the two met in the NCAA Regional Tournament played in Gainesville, Florida (on the campus of the University of Florida). The Knights took the first set 25–19 before losing the next two sets by a score of 25–20 in both sets. The Knights stormed back to take Set Four 25–18, before crushing the Seminoles in Set Five 15–8 to win the match and knock Florida State out of the tournament. Since then, the Knights and Seminoles have played each other in non-conference matchups during most seasons. The all-time record between the two schools is tied 3–3 as of the end of the 2025 season.

== Arena ==
UCF's original home court was the Education Gymnasium in the original Education Building (now part of the Education Complex). The Knights moved to their current home in 1991, which was then the UCF Basketball Arena (with volleyball sharing the arena with both the UCF men's and women's basketball teams). In 2007, the basketball teams moved to their current home (now called Addition Financial Arena). The volleyball team also moved to the new arena for one season as major renovations were underway in the old basketball arena to modify it to a volleyball specific arena. Knights volleyball returned to the original arena, now re-modeled and re-christened The Venue, for the 2008 season. The arena has remained the home of UCF volleyball since that time.

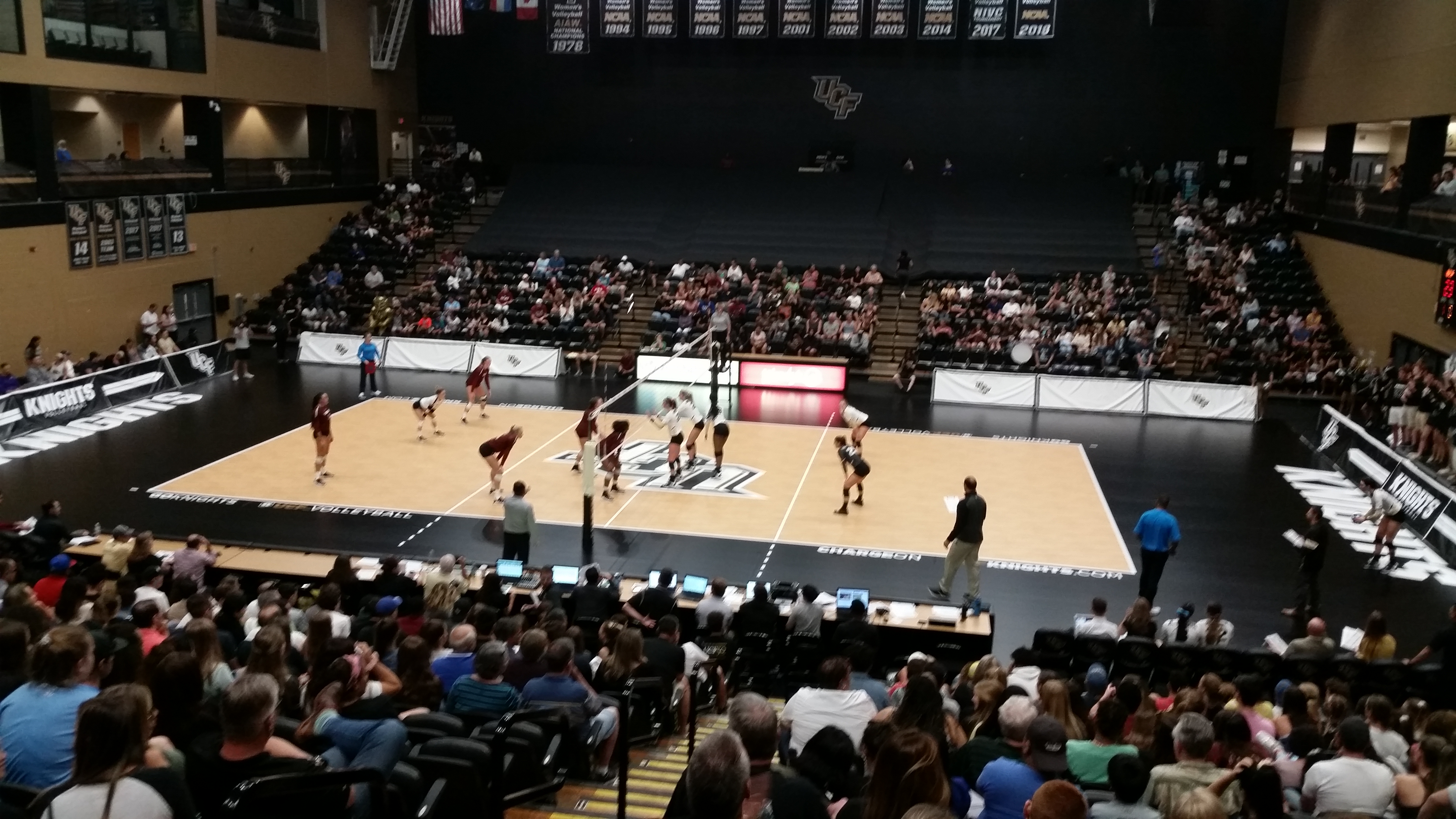
UCF's Volleyball Arena (known as the Venue at UCF) during a home game in 2019.

The Venue is located just behind Addition Financial Arena, with both arenas forming one overall building complex. The Venue itself is an 87,000 square foot facility that has seating for 2,000 fans, and includes more than 31,000 square feet of training facilities, locker rooms, meeting and office space, and player lounges. The complex also features a top-of-the-line sports medicine facility used by the volleyball team and the basketball teams, and a 2,000 square foot weight room. The Venue has undergone further renovations over the years, the latest completed in time for the 2023 season. The latest renovations included new chair back seating for fans (with reserved numbered seating for attendees with tickets), as well new painting and decorative features added to the arena.

As part of the 2023 renovations, a new state-of-the-art video scoreboard was added to the arena by SNA Displays. The screen is 15 feet 4 inches high and 27 feet 6 inches wide, features a 6mm BOLD interior dvLED display (780 x 1,400 pixels), and can process up to one million pixels. On display in the rafters of the arena are banners chronicling the history of UCF's AIAW and NCAA Tournament appearances, with the largest banner honoring the 1978 AIAW National Championship winning team. Banners are also in display honoring players inducted into UCF Volleyball Ring of Honor, located on the opposite courtside wall from the digital scoreboard. The arena also features a courtside student section at each end, with students moving from one side to the other to sit behind the visiting team and provide an often raucous cheering section for the Knights. Most home games also feature either the UCF Jamming Knights Band or drummers from the Drumlines of America organization to help cheer on the Knights.

== Coaches ==
Tenure	Coach	Seasons	Record	Pct.
1975–1979	Lucy McDaniel	5	236–34	.874
1980–1981	Carmen Pennick	2	43-50	.460
1982–1987	Lyn King	6	132–124	.516
1988–1990	Dee Dee McClemmon	3	59–51	.536
1991–1997	Laura Smith	7	188–74	.718
1998	Miriam Ochoa	1	7–15	.318
1999–2007	Meg Colado	9	134–131	.506
2008–2022	Todd Dagenais	15	308–159	.660
2023-2024	Jenny Maurer	2	26-30	.464
2025-	Matt Botsford	1	17-12	.586
Totals	10 coaches	50 seasons	1,079–646	.626
Records are through the conclusion of the 2025 NCAA Season

=== Coaching Honors ===
Lucy McDaniel:

- 1978 National Championship

Todd Dagenais:

- 4x American Athletic Conference Coach of the Year (2014, 2018, 2020, 2021)

== Individual Player Honors and Awards ==
=== All-American Honors ===
An All-American designation identifies elite youth or collegiate players recognized for outstanding performance, typically representing the top talent in the nation. In women’s college volleyball, a consensus All-American is a player who earns first-team All-America honors from multiple major recognized organizations.

Consensus All-Americans

- Laura Smith (2-time Consensus All-American)
- Karin Fischer
- Sharon Koskey
- Celestine Wilson

All-Americans

- Jenny Frank: 2003 AVCA All-American Honorable Mention
- Rachel Vukson: 2011 AVCA All-American Honorable Mention
- DeLaina Sarden: 2013 AVCA All-American First Team; 2012 & 2014 AVCA All-American Honorable Mention
- Angelica Crump: 2013 AVCA All-American Second Team, 2011 AVCA All-American Honorable Mention
- Jade Hayes: 2013 AVCA All-American Second Team
- Kaye-Alese Green: 2014 AVCA All-American Honorable Mention
- Kia Bright: 2014 AVCA All-American Honorable Mention
- Jordan Pingel: 2018 AVCA All-American Honorable Mention
- McKenna Melville: 2022 AVCA All-American First Team; 2021 AVCA All-American Third Team; 2018 & 2019 AVCA All-American Honorable Mention
- Avah Armour: 2025 AVCA All-American Honorable Mention

=== Other National Recognitions ===
McKenna Melville: 2019 USA Volleyball Collegiate National Team (CNT)

=== Conference Honorees ===
Conference Player of the Year Awards:

- Tyra Harper (1997 Atlantic Sun/A-Sun Conference Player of the Year)
- Leyre Santaella Sante (2002 Atlantic Sun/A-SUN Conference Player of the Year)
- Jenny Frank (2003 Atlantic Sun/A-SUN Conference Player of the Year)
- DeLaina Sarden (2014 American Athletic Conference Player of the Year)
- McKenna Melville (3x American Athletic Conference Player of the Year; 2020, 2021, 2022)

Conference Setter of the Year Awards:

- Amber Olson (2x American Athletic Conference Setter of the Year; 2021, 2022)

Conference Freshman/Rookie of the Year Awards:

- DeLaina Sarden (2011 Conference-USA)
- McKenna Melville (2018 American Athletic Conference)

=== All Conference Players ===
All-conference is a prestigious postseason honor recognizing the best-performing players within a specific athletic league or conference, voted on by coaches. It highlights top talent (first, second, or freshman teams) for their performance that season.

Year	First Team	Second Team	Freshman/Rookie Team
(New South Women's Athletic Conference) (1985–1989)
1986	Terri Hinton		
1987	Terri Hinton		
(Atlantic Sun Conference) (1993–2004)
1993	Miriam Metzcus-Ochoa	Emily Queisser	
1994	Miriam Metzcus-Ochoa	Emily Queisser	Tyra Harper
1995	Renata Menchikova, Katja Queisser, Tyra Harper	Emily Queisser	
1996	Renata Menchikova, Tyra Harper		
1997	Renata Menchikova, Amanda Fielding, Tyra Harper		
1999	Piper Morgan		
2000	Piper Morgan	Leyre Santaella Sante	
2001	Leyre Santaella Sante		
2002	Leyre Santaella Sante, Jenny Frank		Emily Watts
2003	Jenny Frank	Tanya Jarvis	
2004	Tanya Jarvis		
(Conference-USA) (2005–2012)
2007		Stephanie Serna	
2008		Stephanie Serna	
2009		Erin Campbell	
2010		Kristin Fisher	Nichole Riedel
2011	Angelica Crump		DeLaina Sarden
2012	DeLaina Sarden	Angelica Crump	
(American Athletic Conference) (2013–2022)
2013	DeLaina Sarden	Angelica Crump, Kaye-Alese Green, Jade Hayes, Marie Reiterova	
2014	Jalé Hervey, Kia Bright, DeLaina Sarden		
2015			Jordan Pingel
2016	Jalé Hervey, Kia Bright		
2017	Kia Bright		Kristina Fisher
2018	McKenna Melville, Jordan Pingel, Kristina Fisher	Anne-Marie Watson	McKenna Melville
2019	McKenna Melville, Anne-Marie Watson, Kristina Fisher		
2020	McKenna Melville, Anne-Marie Watson	Nerissa Moravec	
2021	McKenna Melville, Amber Olson, Anne-Marie Watson, Claudia Dillon	Nerissa Moravec	
2022	McKenna Melville, Amber Olson, Claudia Dillon, Abby Hansen	Kari Zumach	
(Big 12 Conference) (2023–Present)
2024		Brittanie Wilson	
2025	Avah Armour		Alexa Haley

=== UCF Athletics Hall of Fame Inductees ===
Established in 1998, the UCF Athletics Hall of Fame honors former student-athletes, coaches, and contributors who achieved excellence in their sports or made significant contributions to the University of Central Florida's athletic programs. It recognizes decorated individuals who have left a lasting legacy on the Knights' history.

Players (Name and Year Inducted):

- Laura Smith (1999)
- Renata Menchikova (2002)
- Tyra Harper (2004)
- Jenny Frank (2011)
- 1978 Volleyball Team (2015)
- DeLaina Sarden (2023)
- Miriam Metzcus-Ochoa (2025)
- Emily (Queisser) Mottola (2026)

Coaches (Name and Year Inducted):

- Lucy McDaniel (2006)
- Laura Smith (1999)

Note: Laura Smith was inducted for her performance as both a player and a coach.

== Knights in the Pros ==
There have been several pro-volleyball leagues to play in the U.S., with Major League Volleyball being the latest league (first season of play in 2024).

- Tyra Harper: Association of Volleyball Professionals (AVP) Beach Volleyball
- Tanya Jarvis: Florida Wave (Premier Volleyball League-PVL)
- Abby Hansen: Orlando Valkyries (Pro Volleyball Federation/Major League Volleyball)

== Knights on National Volleyball Teams ==
National women's volleyball teams are elite, nation-representative squads competing in top international tournaments like the Olympic Games and FIVB Volleyball Nations League (VNL). Major teams include Brazil, China, Italy, Japan, and the 7th-ranked U.S. Women's National Team, which has medaled in the last four Olympics.

- U.S. Women's National Volleyball Team: Tyra Harper

== Seasons ==
Legend

National Champions
Conference Tournament Champions
Conference Season Champions
Conference Season & Tournament Champions

Year	Head Coach	Overall Record	Conference Record	Postseason
FTU Knights (Independent) (1975–1978)
1975	Lucy McDaniel	30–8	–	–
1976	Lucy McDaniel	41–15	–	–
1977	Lucy McDaniel	56–6	–	4th Place, AIAW Small College National Championship
1978	Lucy McDaniel	55–0	–	AIAW Small College National Champions
UCF Knights (Independent) (1979–1981)
1979	Lucy McDaniel	54–5	–	AIAW Division II National Championship Runner-Up
1980	Carmen Pennick	27–27	–	–
1981	Carmen Pennick	16–23	–	–
UCF Knights (Sunshine State Conference) (1982–1983)
1982	Lyn King	26–25	10–2	–
1983	Lyn King	38–12	10–2	–
UCF Knights (Independent) (1984–1984)
1984	Lyn King	10–25	–	–
UCF Knights (New South Women's Athletic Conference) (1985–1989)
1985	Lyn King	15–24	3–2	–
1986	Lyn King	15–23	3–0	–
1987	Lyn King	28–15	3–0	–
1988	Dee Dee McClemmon	19–20	6–0	–
1989	Dee Dee McClemmon	26–14	5–0	–
UCF Knights (American South Conference) (1990–1990)
1990	Dee Dee McClemmon	14–17	3–0	–
UCF Knights (Sun Belt Conference) (1991–1991)
1991	Laura Smith	24–13	8–7	–
UCF Knights (Independent) (1992–1992)
1992	Laura Smith	15–15	–	–
UCF Knights (Atlantic Sun Conference) (1993–2004)
1993	Laura Smith	35–8	8–0	Women's NIVC Tournament
1994	Laura Smith	31–11	10–0	NCAA tournament
1995	Laura Smith	32–10	6–0	NCAA tournament
1996	Laura Smith	23–13	6–0	NCAA tournament
1997	Laura Smith	28–4	6–0	NCAA tournament
1998	Miriam Ochoa	7–15	2–2	–
1999	Meg Colado	19–12	9–0	–
2000	Meg Colado	19–12	8–1	–
2001	Meg Colado	20–7	9–1	NCAA tournament
2002	Meg Colado	22–13	10–1	NCAA tournament
2003	Meg Colado	23–7	10–0	NCAA tournament second round
2004	Meg Colado	8–15	5–5	–
UCF Knights (Conference USA) (2005–2012)
2005	Meg Colado	9–18	6–10	–
2006	Meg Colado	5–24	1–15	–
2007	Meg Colado	9–23	0–16	–
2008	Todd Dagenais	15–17	6–10	–
2009	Todd Dagenais	12–18	3–13	–
2010	Todd Dagenais	16–16	9–11	–
2011	Todd Dagenais	20–11	12–8	–
2012	Todd Dagenais	18–15	11–6	
UCF Knights (American Athletic Conference) (2013–2022)
2013	Todd Dagenais	21–10	12–6	–
2014	Todd Dagenais	25–8	18–2	NCAA tournament first round
2015	Todd Dagenais	15–17	9–11	–
2016	Todd Dagenais	23–10	13–7	–
2017	Todd Dagenais	20–14	12–8	Women's NIVC Second Round
2018	Todd Dagenais	27–4	18–0	NCAA tournament first round
2019	Todd Dagenais	25–8	14–2	NCAA tournament second round
2020*	Todd Dagenais	16–2	8–0	NCAA tournament first round
2021	Todd Dagenais	27–7	19–1	NCAA tournament second round
2022	Todd Dagenais	28–2	19–1	NCAA tournament second round
UCF Knights (Big 12 Conference) (2023–present)
2023	Jenny Maurer	17-12	8-10	--
2024	Jenny Maurer	9-18	2-15	–
2025	Matt Botsford	17-12	8-10	–
Total	50 Seasons	1,079–646	334–186	18 Postseason Appearances

NOTE: 2020 season held in spring of 2021 due to COVID-19 pandemic

== See also ==
- UCF Knights
- History of the University of Central Florida
- List of University of Central Florida alumni
- List of NCAA Division I women's volleyball programs
