= Dawn Sullivan =

American volleyball coach

Current position
- Title: Head coach
- Team: Missouri
- Conference: SEC
- Record: 74–43 (.632)

Biographical details
- Born: April 10, 1978 (age 48)
- Education: Kansas State

Playing career
- 1996–1999: Kansas State

Coaching career (HC unless noted)
- 2002–2004: Illinois State (assistant)
- 2005–2017: Iowa State (assistant)
- 2018–2022: UNLV
- 2023–present: Missouri

Accomplishments and honors

Championships
- NIVC (2021); 2x Mountain West Conference (2020, 2022)

Awards
- AVCA Central Region Coach of the Year (2024); SEC Coach of the Year (co) (2023); 2x Mountain West Coach of the Year (2020, 2022); Kansas State Wildcats Athletics Hall of Fame (2016); State of Kansas NCAA Woman of the Year (2000)

Dawn Marie Sullivan (née Cady; born April 10, 1978) is an American volleyball coach, and former player. She was named the eighth head coach of Missouri women's volleyball team in December 2022.

== Personal life ==
Sullivan graduated from Marshall High School in Marshall, Minnesota in 1996, where she was a two-sport athlete in volleyball and basketball and received the 1996 Kaiser Award recognizing the female athlete of the year.

== Career ==
=== Playing career ===
Sullivan played as an outside hitter at Kansas State. She was an AVCA All-American and All-Big 12 as a senior as she helped the team make the school's fourth consecutive NCAA Tournament appearance. She earned Kansas College Female-Athlete-of-the-Year honors in 2000.

In her career, she notched 1,611 kills and 1,258 digs, which rank as the third and fourth-most, respectively, in program history. She is one of only five players at Kansas State to eclipse 1,000 kills and 1,000 digs.

Following college, Sullivan played professionally for the Grand Rapids Force of the United States Professional Volleyball League.

=== Coaching career ===
Sullivan began her collegiate coaching career as an assistant coach at Illinois State University in 2002. She joined Iowa State University as an assistant coach in 2005, where she remained until being named the head coach at UNLV in 2018. At UNLV, she led the program to two Mountain West Conference championships, two NCAA Tournament berths, and won the 2021 National Invitational Volleyball Championship.

On December 18, 2022, Sullivan was named the eighth head coach for Missouri. In her inaugural season as head coach, the program doubled its wins from the previous two seasons combined under the prior head coach. Missouri finished 7th in conference and earned an at-large bid into the 2023 NCAA Tournament, its first postseason appearance since 2020. Missouri defeated Delaware in the first round before falling to top-seeded Nebraska in the second round. She was named the 2023 SEC co-coach of the year for her efforts.

In 2024, Sullivan led Missouri to continued improvements, finishing 3rd in conference play and earning a trip to the NCAA regionals for the first time since 2017. She was named AVCA Central Coach of the Year for her performance.

== Head coaching record ==
Record table
| Season | Team | Overall | Conference | Standing | Postseason |
|---|---|---|---|---|---|
UNLV Rebels (Mountain West) (2018–2022)
| 2018 | UNLV | 22–12 | 10–8 | 5th | NIVC semifinals |
| 2019 | UNLV | 20–11 | 15–3 | 3rd | NIVC second round |
| 2020 | UNLV | 13–1 | 12–0 | 1st | NCAA second round |
| 2021 | UNLV | 28–9 | 12–6 | 4th | NIVC Champions |
| 2022 | UNLV | 26–5 | 17–1 | 1st | NCAA first round |
| UNLV: | | 109–38 (.741) | 66–18 (.786) | | |
Missouri Tigers (SEC) (2023–present)
| 2023 | Missouri | 18–13 | 9–9 | 7th | NCAA second round |
| 2024 | Missouri | 22–9 | 11–5 | T–3rd | NCAA regional semifinal |
| 2025 | Missouri | 17–11 | 8–7 | T–6th | |
| 2026 | Missouri | 17–10 | 10–5 | 6th | |
| Missouri: | | 74–43 (.632) | 38–26 (.594) | | |
| Total: | | 183–76 (.707) | | | |
National champion Postseason invitational champion Conference regular season champion Conference regular season and conference tournament champion Division regular season champion Division regular season and conference tournament champion Conference tournament champion
