= Giovanni Guidetti =

Italian volleyball coach

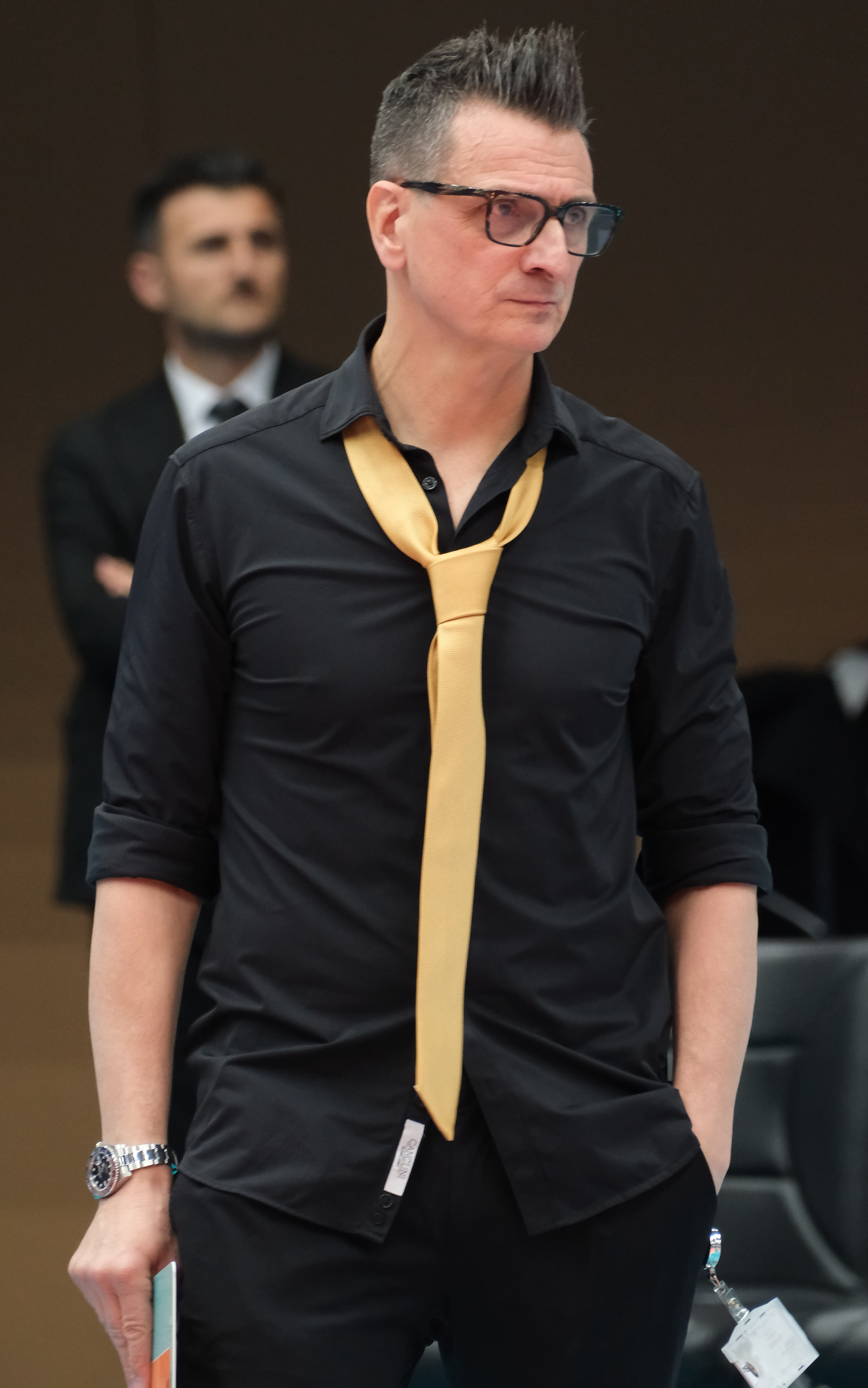
- Giovanni Guidetti in 2025

Personal information
- Nationality: Italian
- Born: 20 September 1972 (age 54) Modena, Italy

Coaching information
- Current team: Canada (coach)
- Previous teams coached
- Years: Teams
- 1994–1998; 2000–2001; 2001–2002; 2001-2002; 2002-2003; 2003–2004; 2004–2007; 2008–; 2003–2004; 2006–2014; 2015–2016; 2017–2022; 2023–2024; 2025–: Volley 2000 Spezzano; USPV; Vicenza Volley; Figurella Firenze; PV Reggio Emilia; PV Modena; Chieri Volley; Vakıfbank; Bulgaria; Germany; Netherlands; Turkey; Serbia; Canada
Honours
Coach for Women's volleyball
Germany
World Grand Prix
Bronze medal – third place	2009 Tokyo
European Championship
Silver medal – second place	2013 Germany/Switzerland
Silver medal – second place	2011 Italy/Serbia
European League
Gold medal – first place	2013 Bulgaria
Silver medal – second place	2014 Germany/Turkey
Netherlands
World Grand Prix
Bronze medal – third place	2016 Bangkok
European Championship
Silver medal – second place	2015 Netherlands/Belgium
Turkey
FIVB Nations League
Silver medal – second place	2018 Nanjing
Bronze medal – third place	2021 Nanjing
European Championship
Silver medal – second place	2019 Slovakia/Hungary/Poland/Turkey
Bronze medal – third place	2017 Azerbaijan/Georgia
Bronze medal – third place	2021 Serbia/Croatia/Bulgaria/Romania
Serbia
European Championships
Silver medal – second place	2023 Belgium/Estonia/Germany/Italy
Canada
Women's NORCECA Volleyball Championship
Gold medal – first place	2026 Santo Domingo

Giovanni Guidetti (born 20 September 1972) is an Italian volleyball coach. He is the current coach for the Canada women's national volleyball team. He has been coaching the Turkish team Vakıfbank Spor Kulübü since 2008. He coached the Turkey women's national team between 2017 and 2022.

== Career ==
Guidetti coached from 1995 until 1998 the team Volley 2000 Spezzano in his hometown. In 1997, the team was promoted to the Italian Women's League Serie A. For this success, he was awarded the title "Coach of the Year." Between 1997 and 2000, he served as the vice coach of the Italy women's national volleyball team. During this period, he took part in the 1998 World Championship in Japan and at the 2000 Summer Olympics in Sydney.

After his function at the United States Professional Volleyball League (USPV) in the 2000–01 season, he returned to Italy as coach of Vicenza Volley. He coached the US women's national B-team and the Bulgaria women's national team.

In the season 2003-04, he was the coach of Pallavolo Modena. Afterwards, he transferred to Chieri Volley, where he was named in 2004 again the "Coach of the Year" and won the Women's CEV Cup in 2005. In April 2006, he became the head coach of the Germany women's national team. Since 2008, Guidetti acts as the coach of the Turkish team Vakıfbank.

Guidetti won the gold medal at the 2013 Club World Championship, coaching Vakıfbank Istanbul.

Between 2015 and 2016, Guidetti coached the Netherlands women's national volleyball team, leading them to silver in the 2015 European championship, bronze in the 2016 Grand Prix, and fourth in the 2016 Summer Olympics. He left the Dutch squad in late 2016, hoping to live full-time in Istanbul, and took up the coaching job for the Turkish national team.

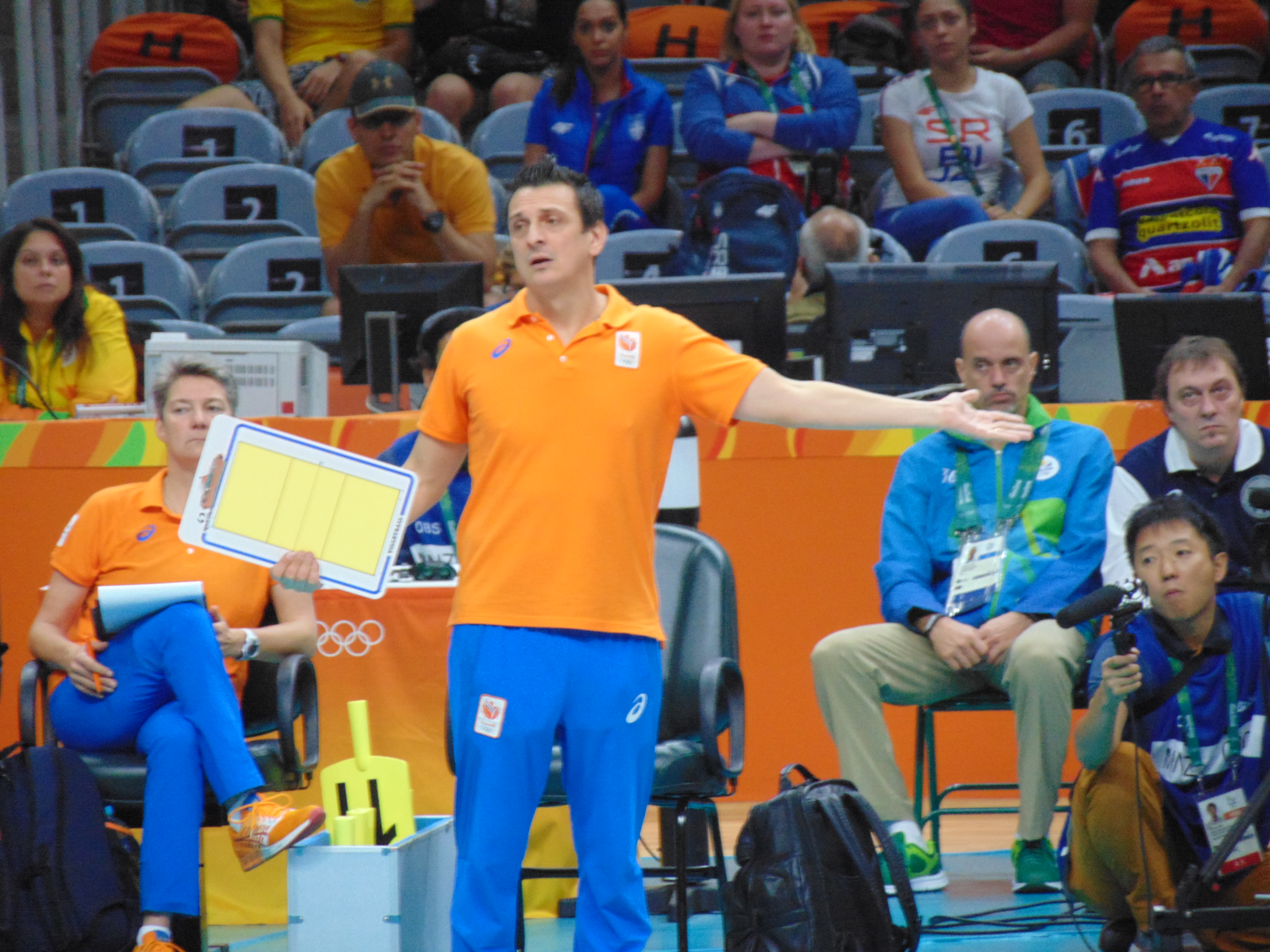
Guidetti as the Dutch coach during the 2016 Olympics

== Vakıfbank Years ==
After signing with Vakıfbank, Guidetti quickly began reforming the team. In his first season, Vakıfbank was noted for in attacking with unique players such as Neslihan Demir, Jelena Nikolić, and Angelina Grün but relatively poor in defence. Vakıfbank, competing in the Turkish League, lost to Galatasaray in the play-off first round match. In the 2009–10 season, Vakıfbank improved their volleyball level, but Fenerbahçe Acıbadem won the league title with a. In the 2010–2011 season, Vakıfbank Spor Kulübü won the CEV Women's Champions League with a winning streak of 12–0 and became the only unbeaten team in Champions League history. They defeated the host and favourites Fenerbahçe Acıbadem in the semi-final 3–2 and Rabita Baku from Azerbaijan in the final game in straight sets of 3–0. Domestically, the league championship was won by Fenerbahçe Acıbadem again. The 2011–2012 season was a big disappointment for Guidetti. They lost to RC Cannes in the quarter finals of the Champions League in a golden set. They lost the Turkish League again to Eczacıbaşı VitrA.

The 2012–2013 season was a record year for Guidetti and his team. They signed with stars such as Jovana Brakočević, Saori Kimura, and Naz Aydemir. Vakıfbank Spor Kulübü won the Turkish League, Turkish Cup, and Champions League with a winning streak of 47–0. They won all the matches of the season and set a record for volleyball history. All the players contributed to offence, defence, blocking, and service with the help of Guidetti. He used all fourteen players in the games, managing all of them with great harmony. He was selected to the FIVB Coaching Commission after his stable success and re-signed to the Turkish side for two more years.

== Personal life ==
On 20 September 2013 he married Turkish volleyball player Bahar Toksoy, the middle blocker of Guidetti's team Vakıfbank and Turkish national team. The couple's first child was born in September 2016.
