= UNLV Rebels women's volleyball =

College volleyball team

- Founded: 1978; 48 years ago
- University: University of Nevada, Las Vegas
- Athletic director: Erick Harper
- Head coach: Malia Shoji (4th season)
- Conference: Mountain West
- Location: Las Vegas, Nevada, US
- Home arena: The Pavilion (capacity: 3,000)
- Nickname: Rebels
- Colors: Scarlet and gray

AIAW/NCAA tournament appearance
- 2007, 2016, 2020, 2022

Conference tournament champion
- 2007

Conference regular season champion
- 2020, 2022

The UNLV Rebels women's volleyball team competes as part of NCAA Division I, representing the University of Nevada, Las Vegas in the Mountain West. UNLV plays its home games at the Cox Pavilion.

== History ==
UNLV started their volleyball program in 1978 as a Division 1 independent team. They finished their first season with a 10-7 record. From 1978 to 1980 UNLV would remain independent and pose an overall record of 29-23-2.

UNLV did not field a volleyball team from 1981 to 1983 but started up again in 1984 as a Big West Conference member. They would only be in the Big West for 2 seasons before again suspending the volleyball program, this time for 11 years.

In 1996 UNLV would start up their volleyball program again as a Western Athletic Conference member. Their first season back they finished with a 5-22 record under head coach Deitre Collins.

UNLV joined the Mountain West Conference in 1999. Collins would resign as head coach in 2003, with an overall record of 89-136. Allison Keeley would take over as head coach.

Under coach Keeley UNLV had a breakout season in 2007, going 24-6, winning the Mountain West tournament, and making the 2007 NCAA Division I women's volleyball tournament. This was the programs first NCAA volleyball tournament appearance. They would end up losing to Long Beach State in the first round.

In 2010 UNLV hired Cindy Fredrick as their next head coach. In 2014 she would lead the team to a program high 26 wins. She would also lead the team to the programs second tournament appearance in the 2016 NCAA Division I women's volleyball tournament where they would upset the No. 22 ranked Utah Utes in the first round of the tournament. They would then lose to BYU in the second round.

Dawn Sullivan would take over as head coach in 2018. In her first season as head coach the team went 22-12 and made the National Invitational Volleyball Championship. Under Sullivan's reign the team made 2 NCAA tournament appearances in 2020 and 2022. The 2020 team would make the second round of the tournament after beating Illinois State in the first round and then losing to Kentucky in the second round. The 2022 team would lose to Washington State in the first round.

UNLV hired Malia Shoji as their next head coach in 2023.

UNLV set a home attendance program record of 3,117 on September 17th, 2024 against Hawai'i. It was the first time UNLV hosted Hawai'i at home since 1997. UNLV won 3 sets to 2.

UNLV has an all time record of 496-421-2.

== Coaches ==
=== Coaching history ===
No.	Coach	Tenure	Overall	Conference	Achievements
1	Matti Smith	1978	10-7 (.588)	N/A	
2	Gena Borda	1979-80	19–16–2 (.541)	N/A	
3	Karen Lamb	1984-85	39–34 (.534)	6-18 (.250)	
4	Deitre Collins	1996-03	89–136 (.396)	41-63 (.394)	
5	Allison Keeley	2004-10	103–96 (.518)	59-51 (.536)	2007 NCAA Division I women's volleyball tournament appearance
6	Cindy Fredrick	2011-17	122–93 (.567)	60-58 (.508)	2016 NCAA Division I women's volleyball tournament appearance
7	Dawn Sullivan	2018-22	109–38 (.741)	66-18 (.786)	2020 and 2022 NCAA tournament appearance
8	Malia Shoji	2023-	(–)	(–)	
