= The Venue at UCF =

Arena in Orlando, Florida, US

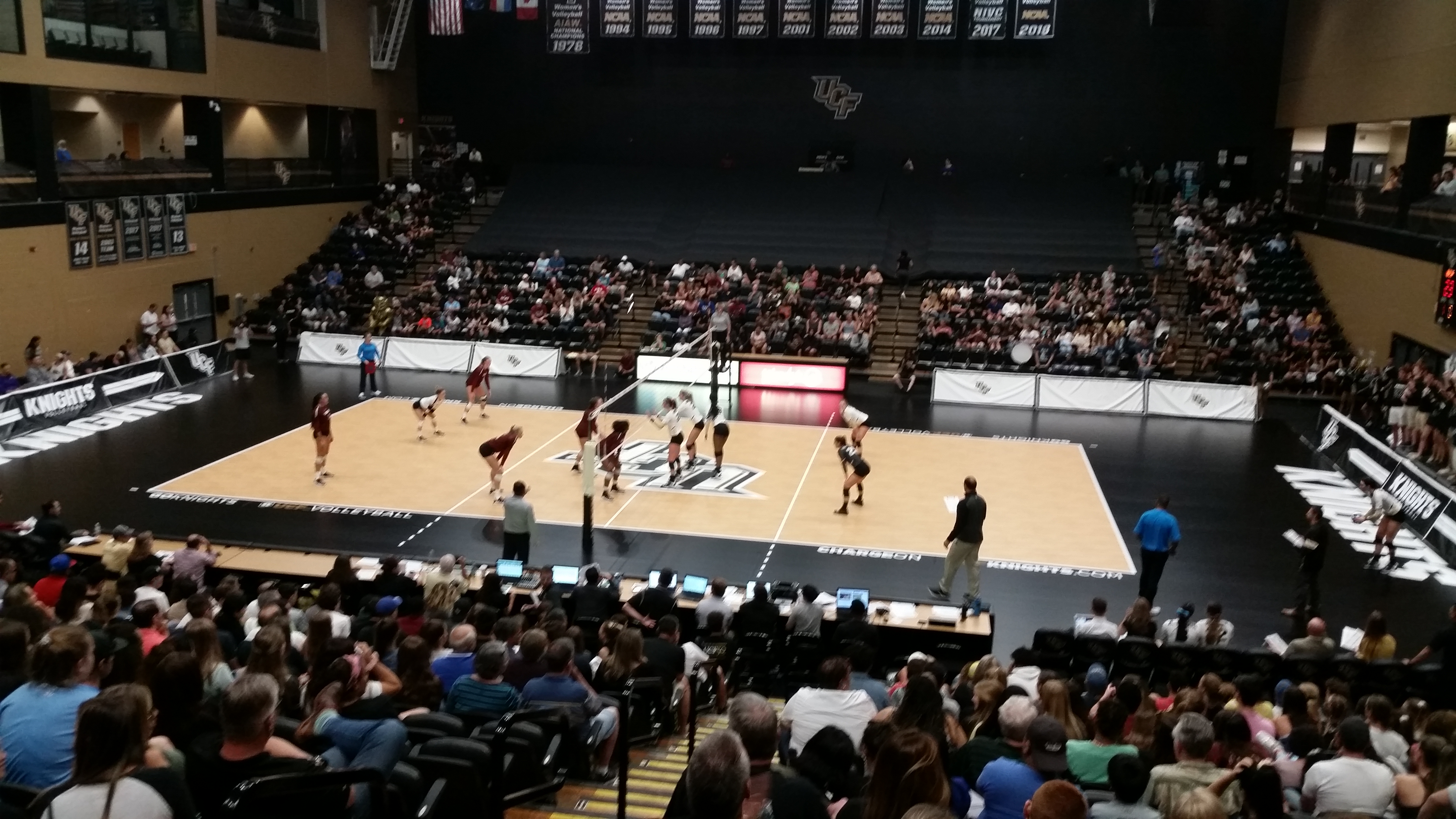
- A 2019 women's volleyball game at the Venue at UCF
- Interactive map of The Venue at UCF
- Full name: The Venue at the University of Central Florida
- Former names: UCF Arena (1991–2007)
- Location: 12777 Gemini Blvd N. Orlando, Florida 32816; United States]
- Coordinates: 28°36′29″N 81°11′49″W
- Owner: University of Central Florida
- Operator: Global Spectrum
- Capacity: 5,100 (1991–2007); 3,000 (general admission); 2,500 (volleyball)
- Surface: Multi-surface
- Public transit: UCF Transit Center,

Construction
- Groundbreaking: 1990 (35–36 years)
- Opened: August 16, 1991 (35 years, 69 days)
- Renovated: 2007–08

Tenants
- UCF Knights basketball (NCAA) (1991–2007); UCF Knights volleyball (NCAA) (1991–present)

The Venue at UCF is a sports and entertainment arena located near Orlando, Florida, United States on the main campus of the University of Central Florida in unincorporated Orange County. The Venue is owned by the university, and is managed by Global Spectrum, a subsidiary of Philadelphia-based Comcast Spectacor.

The arena, which was opened in 1991, housed the Knights men's and women's basketball teams from 1991 to 2007, and has served as home to UCF's volleyball team since 1991. The Venue also serves as a practice facility for the university's basketball teams, and houses administrative offices for the same.

The Venue is 87,000 square feet (8,100 m^{2}), and boosts 2,500 fixed seats, or up to 3,000 standing-room general admission. The Venue can be configured for concerts, family events, musical theatre, commencements, and other stage shows and sporting events.

== History ==
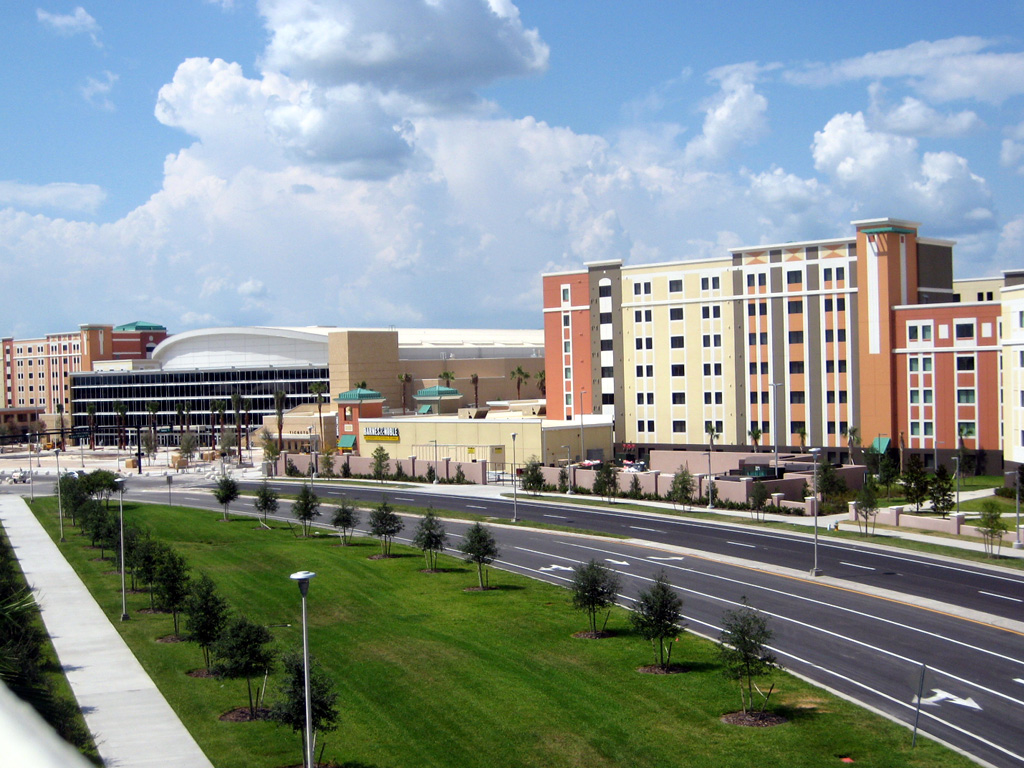
The Venue at UCF is located behind Addition Financial Arena, at left.

In 2007, the arena was replaced by the Addition Financial Arena as the game facility for both the men's and women's basketball teams. The last basketball game played in the facility was on March 3, 2007, when the Golden Knights men's team beat the East Carolina Pirates, 77–64, in Conference USA play. The last women's game was on March 1, when they lost to the Southern Methodist Mustangs, 79–58. The arena hosted the Atlantic Sun Conference men's basketball tournament three times, in 1994, 1995, and 2002.

Following the opening of the new arena, the facility was renamed The Venue at UCF and was renovated in 2007 and 2008. When it reopened in April 2008, its retractable bleachers were replaced by 2,500 fixed stadium seats. The Venue is used as both a facility for minor indoor sports such as volleyball, as well as a training facility for the Knights basketball teams. It also houses a 2,000-square-foot (190 m^{2}) weight room for use by student athletes. It also serves as the Robot Pit area for the annual FIRST FRC – FIRST Robotics Competition Orlando Regional Competition held at the CFE Arena.

== See also ==
- Greater Orlando
