= Todd Dagenais =

American college volleyball player, coach, author

Todd Dagenais is a former American college volleyball coach, former player, and author. Dagenais is still very involved with Volleyball. He is now the League One Volleyball (LOVB) Director of Competition. He was the first head coach of the Pro Volleyball Federation's Atlanta franchise where he guided the team to a 19-5 record claiming the regular season championship. He was the head coach of the UCF Knights women's volleyball team of the University of Central Florida. for 15 years. He previously served as an assistant head coach at USC and MSU.

Dagenais has released a series of book and DVD guides for volleyball.

In 2019, Dagenais was announced as an inductee into the Upper Peninsula Sports Hall of Fame in his native Michigan.

== Coaching record ==
Legend

National champions
Conference tournament champions
Conference season champions
Conference season & tournament champions

Year	Head coach	Overall record	Conference record	Conference finish	Postseason
UCF Knights (Conference USA) (2008–2012)
2008	Todd Dagenais	15–17	6–10	T-8th	Lost in C-USA Tournament Quarterfinals
2009	Todd Dagenais	12–18	3–13	T-10th	–
2010	Todd Dagenais	16–16	9–11	8th	–
2011	Todd Dagenais	20–11	12–8	T-4th	–
2012	Todd Dagenais	18–15	11–6	T-3rd	–
			41-48		
UCF Knights (American Athletic Conference) (2013–present)
2013	Todd Dagenais	21–10	12–6	3rd	–
2014	Todd Dagenais	25–8	18–2	Champions	NCAA Tournament First Round
2015	Todd Dagenais	15–17	9–11	T-7th	–
2016	Todd Dagenais	23–10	13–7	4th	–
2017	Todd Dagenais	20–14	12–8	5th	Women's NIVC Second Round
2018	Todd Dagenais	27–4	18–0	Champions	NCAA Tournament First Round
2019	Todd Dagenais	25-8	14-2	Champions	NCAA Tournament Second Round
2020	Todd Dagenais	16-2	8-0	Champions	NCAA First Round
2021	Todd Dagenais	27-7	19-1	Champions	NCAA Tournament Second Round
2022	Todd Dagenais	28-2	19-1	Co-Champions	NCAA Tournament Second Round
Total	15 Seasons	318-132 (.707)	142-38 (.822)	6 x Champions	6 NCAA Tournaments
