= Missouri Tigers women's volleyball =

American college volleyball team

- University: University of Missouri
- Head coach: Dawn Sullivan (3rd season)
- Conference: SEC
- Location: Columbia, Missouri, US
- Home arena: Hearnes Center (capacity: 13,611)
- Nickname: Missouri Tigers
- Colors: Black and gold

The Missouri Tigers women's volleyball team represents the University of Missouri in the SEC.

== Current coaching staff ==
- Dawn Sullivan - Head Coach

== History ==
Wayne Kreklow was hired by Mizzou in 2000 while he coached for Columbia College, and he assumed the role of head coach in 2005. Also hired in 2000, his wife, Susan served as director of volleyball.

In the 2013 season, Missouri clinched the Southeastern Conference championship—the university's first in any sport since entering the SEC in 2012—with a perfect regular season, finishing with a 35–1 record after losing in round two of the NCAA Tournament. Senior setter Molly Kreklow went on to be selected by U.S. women's national volleyball team to compete in the NORCECA Women's Volleyball Championship.

Missouri has made the tournament 19 times since 2000, most recently in 2024

Year	Coach	Overall Record	Conference Record	Conference Standing	Postseason
1974	Debbie Duren	20–18	-		
1975	Debbie Duren	14–16	-		
1976	Debbie Duren	24–10–1	-		
1977	Debbie Duren	33–17–8	-		
1978	Debbie Duren	37–19–1	-		
1979	Debbie Duren	19–20–6	-		
1980	Mike English	17–14	-		
1981	Mike English	28–15	-		
1982	Mike English	26–6	-		
(Big Eight) (1983–1995)
1983	Mike English	26–11	7–3	2nd	
1984	Mike English	15–15	7–3	2nd	
1985	Mike English	17–14	4–6	3rd	
1986	Craig Sherman	8–19	3–6	5th	
1987	Craig Sherman	9–22	1–11	7th	
1988	Craig Sherman	14–18	4–8	T-4th	
1989	Craig Sherman	6–27	0–12	7th	
1990	Craig Sherman	9–19	1–11	7th	
1991	Craig Sherman	10–22	1–11	T–6th	
1992	Craig Sherman	22–11	4–8	5th	
1993	Craig Sherman	10–18	3–9	6th	
1994	Disa Johnson	9–24	0–12	7th	
1995	Disa Johnson	6–25	1–11	6th	
(Big 12) (1996–2011)
1996	Disa Johnson	0–28	0–20	11th	
1997	Disa Johnson	15–20	4–16	9th	
1998	Disa Johnson	14–19	5–15	8th	
1999	Disa Johnson	10–21	4–16	9th	
2000	Susan Kreklow	24–7	14–6	2nd	NCAA 1st Round
2001	Susan Kreklow	20–11	10–10	5th	NCAA 1st Round
2002	Susan Kreklow	26–8	14–6	3rd	NCAA 2nd Round
2003	Susan Kreklow	19–11	12–8	6th	NCAA 1st Round
2004	Susan Kreklow	20–9	14–6	3rd	NCAA 2nd Round
2005	Wayne Kreklow	25–5	16–4	3rd	NCAA Regional Final
2006	Wayne Kreklow	18–13	11–9	6th	NCAA 2nd Round
2007	Wayne Kreklow	17–13	10–10	7th	NCAA 1st Round
2008	Wayne Kreklow	13–17	7–13	T–8th	
2009	Wayne Kreklow	18–14	9–11	7th	
2010	Wayne Kreklow	22–11	12–8	5th	NCAA Sweet 16
2011	Wayne Kreklow	21–13	7–9	6th	NCAA 1st Round
(SEC) (2012–present)
2012	Wayne Kreklow	19–12	10–10	4th	
2013	Wayne Kreklow	35–1	18–0	1st	NCAA 2nd Round
2014	Wayne Kreklow	16–17	7–11	9th	
2015	Wayne Kreklow	27–6	14–4	T–2nd	NCAA 2nd Round
2016	Wayne Kreklow	27–6	16–2	1st	NCAA Sweet 16
2017	Wayne Kreklow	22–12	13–5	3rd	NCAA Sweet 16
2018	Wayne Kreklow	24–8	13–5	4th	NCAA 2nd Round
2019	Joshua Taylor	22–8	13–5	T–3rd	NCAA 2nd Round
2020	Joshua Taylor	16–8	15–7	3rd	NCAA 2nd Round
2021	Joshua Taylor	5–26	2–16	13th	
2022	Joshua Taylor	9–19	2–16	13th	
2023	Dawn Sullivan	18–13	9–9	7th	NCAA 2nd Round
2024	Dawn Sullivan	22–9	11–5	4th	NCAA 3rd Round
2025	Dawn Sullivan	17–11	8–7	T-6th	-
Total		940–756–16	336–380		

== See also ==
- List of NCAA Division I women's volleyball programs
