= Bill Walton (volleyball) =

American volleyball coach

Playing career
- 1970–1974: George Williams

Coaching career (HC unless noted)
- 1981–1985: Elmhurst
- 1986–2009: Houston
- 2024: Grand Rapids Rise (assoc. HC)

Head coaching record
- Overall: 673–377–1 (.641)

Accomplishments and honors

Championships
- 2 NCAA Division III tournament (1983, 1985); NIVC (1990); 3 CCIW regular season (1983–1985); 4 CCIW tournament (1982–1985); SWC regular season (1994); SWC tournament (1994); C-USA regular season (1999); C-USA tournament (1997)

Awards
- 2x SWC Coach of the Year (1992, 1994)

William G. Walton is an American volleyball coach who last served as the associate head coach for the Grand Rapids Rise of the Pro Volleyball Federation. He previously served as the head coach of the women's teams at Elmhurst University and the University of Houston.

== Head coaching record ==
Record table
Season	Team	Overall	Conference	Standing	Postseason
Elmhurst Bluejays (College Conference of Illinois and Wisconsin) (1981–1985)
1981	Elmhurst	40–20			AIAW Tournament
1982	Elmhurst	44–8–1			NCAA Division III Regional
1983	Elmhurst	57–4	7–0	1st	NCAA Division III Champion
1984	Elmhurst	34–17	7–0	1st	NCAA Division III Regional
1985	Elmhurst	40–9	7–0	1st	NCAA Division III Champion
Elmhurst:		215–58–1 (.786)	21–0 (1.000)		
Houston Cougars (Southwest Conference) (1986–1995)
1986	Houston	14–13	4–6	4th	
1987	Houston	24–13	5–5	3rd	
1988	Houston	20–11	6–4	T–2nd	
1989	Houston	25–10	7–3	T–2nd	NCAA Division I Regional first round
1990	Houston	24–15	6–4	3rd	NIVC Champion
1991	Houston	20–12	6–4	3rd	NCAA Division I Regional first round
1992	Houston	20–12	8–2	2nd	NCAA Division I Regional first round
1993	Houston	20–16	6–4	3rd	NCAA Division I Regional second round
1994	Houston	26–7	9–1	1st	NCAA Division I Regional final
1995	Houston	17–14	4–6	T–3rd	NCAA Division I Regional first round
Houston Cougars (Conference USA) (1996–2009)
1996	Houston	24–8	12–2	2nd	NCAA Division I Regional first round
1997	Houston	23–10	14–2	2nd	NCAA Division I Regional first round
1998	Houston	21–13	11–5	T–2nd	NCAA Division I Regional first round
1999	Houston	22–10	13–3	1st	NCAA Division I Regional first round
2000	Houston	21–11	11–5	2nd	NCAA Division I Regional first round
2001	Houston	16–11	12–4	4th	
2002	Houston	19–13	7–6	T–7th	
2003	Houston	12–20	6–7	T–7th	
2004	Houston	11–21	5–8	T–8th	
2005	Houston	18–12	10–4	2nd	
2006	Houston	19–17	8–8	7th	
2007	Houston	13–15	8–8	6th	
2008	Houston	20–12	10–6	4th	
2009	Houston	9–23	6–10	8th	
Houston:		458–319 (.589)	194–117 (.624)		
Total:		673–377–1 (.641)			
National champion Postseason invitational champion Conference regular season champion Conference regular season and conference tournament champion Division regular season champion Division regular season and conference tournament champion Conference tournament champion
