= Yuengling Center =

Indoor arena in Florida, United States

- "The Keg"

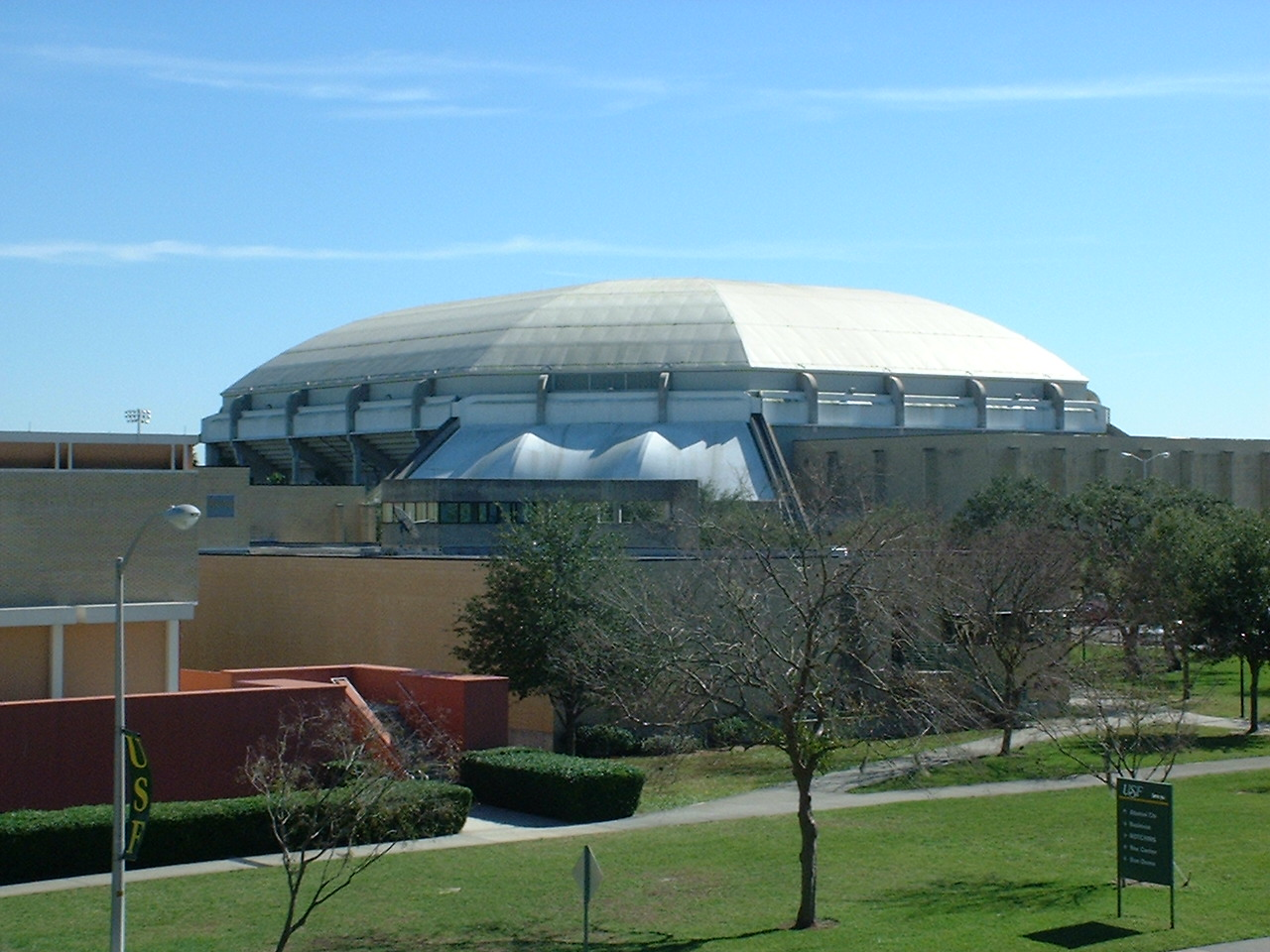
- Interactive map of Yuengling Center
- Former names: USF Sun Dome (1980–2018)
- Address: 12499 USF Bull Run Drive
- Location: Tampa, Florida, United States
- Coordinates: 28°03′33.25″N 82°24′23.30″W
- Owner: University of South Florida
- Operator: Tampa Bay Entertainment Properties, LLC, a division of Vinik Sports Group, LLC
- Capacity: Basketball: 10,500
- Surface: QuickLock Portable Floor (northern hard maple)
- Record attendance: Men's basketball: 10,659; Women's basketball: 10,488

Construction
- Groundbreaking: 1977
- Opened: November 29, 1980
- Renovated: 1993; 1995; 2000; 2011
- Cost: $12 million ($63.8 million in 2025 dollars)
- Architects: Barger + Dean Architects, Inc.

Tenants
- South Florida Bulls men's basketball (1980–present); South Florida Bulls women's basketball (1980–present); South Florida Bulls volleyball (1995–present); Tampa Bay Strikers (NISL) (2022–2024); UpShot Tampa (UpShot League) (2027–)

Website
- yuenglingcenter.com

Yuengling Center (formerly the USF Sun Dome) is an indoor arena on the main campus of the University of South Florida (USF) in Tampa, Florida, United States. Construction began in November 1977, and it opened in November 1980. The arena serves as the home venue for several University of South Florida athletic programs, including the men's and women's basketball teams. With 10,500 seats (including over 3,500 in the student section), it is the third-largest basketball arena by capacity in the American Conference.

== History ==
Before the Yuengling Center, USF's basketball teams played at various locations on and off campus. The basketball teams first played at Curtis Hixon Hall in downtown Tampa, and later split their home schedule between Curtis Hixon Hall, the Bayfront Center in St. Petersburg, Expo Hall at the Florida State Fairgrounds, and the USF Gymnasium on campus, among others.

By 1975, both the University of South Florida and the University of Florida in Gainesville had decided to build new on-campus indoor sports facilities. The two schools pooled their resources and shared the cost of a basic arena design to stretch limited state funding. The "core unit" of the Sun Dome and UF's O'Connell Center were nearly identical, and they each featured a flexible, inflatable roof made of Teflon and supported by a system of blowers. However, the O'Connell Center included facilities for other sports (namely gymnastics, volleyball, swimming and diving) around the main arena, while the Sun Dome as originally built did not, though it later added The Corral for the women's volleyball team after a renovation in 1995.

The $12 million Sun Dome broke ground in November 1977 on formerly open land on the southeast side of campus near Fowler Avenue. Construction was slowed on both the Sun Dome and the O'Connell Center when cracks appeared in precast concrete support beams. The problems were eventually fixed, and the sister facilities were completed within a few weeks of each other in late 1980 – the Sun Dome in November and the O'Connell Center in December.

The first two events at the new arena were a USF men's basketball game against Florida A&M and a concert by Alice Cooper.

In 2000, the original inflatable roof was replaced with a more conventional hard dome and additional facilities for USF indoor sports programs were added around the main arena at a cost of about $8 million (about $15 million in 2025 dollars).

In 2011, USF began a major renovation of the Yuengling Center at a cost of $35.6 million (about $51 million in 2025 dollars). Among other interior improvements, this renovation reconfigured the seating area to make the facility ADA compliant and LEED Silver certified. It also added a larger center hung scoreboard, a larger team store, a new concourse level with concessions and restrooms, and a new, athletes-only dining hall. On the outside, original exterior concrete was repaired, bricks were added to some portions of the façade, and the entrance gates were improved. This project was completed in April 2012.

In 2017, USF announced that the Sun Dome's management would be taken over by Jeff Vinik, owner of the Tampa Bay Lightning, via Tampa Bay Entertainment Properties, LLC. On June 12, 2018, USF announced a 10-year naming rights deal with brewer Yuengling, effective July 1, 2018.

In April 2021, WWE began a long-term residency at Yuengling Center, broadcasting its shows from a behind closed doors set called the WWE ThunderDome, which lasted until July 2021.

The student section was renamed in honor of former USF men's basketball coach Amir Abdur-Rahim following his death in 2024.

== The Corral ==
The Corral opened in 1995 as the home to the Bulls volleyball team at a cost of $5 million (about $10.6 million in 2025 dollars). The Corral spans 11,500 square feet on the west side of the arena with a capacity of up to 1,000 fans. Prior to the opening of The Corral, the volleyball team played in the USF Gymnasium, now called the Campus Recreation Center.

== Events ==
In addition to USF sporting events, the Yuengling Center hosts USF's commencement ceremonies along with many concerts, shows, and special events.

=== Concert history ===
Between the arena's opening in 1981 until the opening of what is now known as Benchmark International Arena in 1996, the Yuengling Center was the premier indoor concert venue in the Tampa Bay area and hosted many big-name artists.

The first concert held at the Yuengling Center (then the USF Sun Dome) was Alice Cooper, on November 25, 1980. Other notable acts hosted at the Yuengling Center prior to the renovations completed in 2012 include Jimmy Buffett (1982, 1985, 1986, and 1988), The Beach Boys (1984, 1985, and 1989), Ozzy Osbourne (1984, 1988, and 1991), Grateful Dead (1985), U2 (1985), Madonna (1985), Tom Petty (1985, 1990, and 1995), Billy Joel (1987), Frank Sinatra (1987 and 1988), Fleetwood Mac (1987 and 1990), AC/DC (1988), Bob Dylan (1988, 1993, 2006, and 2010), Bon Jovi (1995), Steely Dan (1996), Backstreet Boys (1998), Britney Spears (1998 and 1999), System of a Down (1999 and 2002), Green Day (2005), My Chemical Romance (2005), Kanye West (2005), Tool (2007), Lil Wayne (2007), Daddy Yankee (2009), and Drake (2011). On September 14, 2012, Elton John performed the first concert held in the renovated building, his third concert at the arena in total.

Since the 2012 renovation, notable concerts include Imagine Dragons (2013), Fall Out Boy (2013), Panic! at the Disco (2013 and 2014), Alan Jackson (2015), Zedd (2015), 2 Chainz (2016 and 2022), Arcade Fire (2017), Tyler, the Creator (2019 and 2022), Young Thug (2019), Illenium (2019), AJR (2019), Portugal. The Man (2022), Ghost (2022), Ice Cube (2023), Billy Strings (2023, 2024, and 2025), and Gucci Mane (2024).

=== Combat sports ===
WWE has hosted several professional wrestling events at the Sun Dome; it hosted Saturday Night's Main Event for the first time in 1985, and hosted the pay-per-view Royal Rumble in 1995 (which notably saw Shawn Michaels become the first person entering at number 1 to win the titular Royal Rumble match by outlasting all 29 of the other participants). On March 24, 2021, WWE announced that it would move its ThunderDome residency—a bio-secure bubble used to film the company's weekly programs Raw, SmackDown, and Main Event, as well as those shows' associated pay-per-views, due to the COVID-19 pandemic—to Yuengling Center beginning with the April 12 episode of Raw, following WrestleMania 37 (which was held at Tampa's Raymond James Stadium). The ThunderDome was relocated from Tropicana Field due to the start of the Tampa Bay Rays' 2021 season; as before, programs produced at the arena were held behind closed doors with no in-person audience. During their residency at the Yuengling Center, WWE held two pay-per-view events, WrestleMania Backlash and Hell in a Cell. WWE resumed live touring on July 16, thus ending the ThunderDome productions. The company finished tapings at the Yuengling Center on July 9; the final show to air featuring the ThunderDome at the Yuengling Center was the July 15 episode of Main Event. On March 7, 2025, WWE announced that it would host four events at the Yuengling Center from May 24 - May 27, 2025. The four events will be Saturday Night's Main Event XXXIX on May 24, Battleground on May 25, Monday Night Raw on May 26, and NXT on May 27.

Creator Clash was hosted at the Yuengling Center in 2022.

UFC hosted UFC Fight Night: Lauzon vs Stephens at the Sun Dome on February 7, 2009. The Sun Dome also hosted Bellator 72 and 94 in 2012 and 2013 respectively.

On March 28, 2026, Real American Freestyle presented RAF 07 from the venue, an event that was broadcast live on Fox Nation.

Bound for Glory, a Total Nonstop Action Wrestling (TNA) professional wrestling event (and the promotion's flagship marquee event), will take place at the Yuengling Center on October 11, 2026.

== See also ==
- University of South Florida athletic facilities
- List of NCAA Division I basketball arenas
