= South Florida Bulls volleyball =

American college volleyball team

- Founded: 1972; 54 years ago
- University: University of South Florida
- Athletic director: Michael Kelly
- Head coach: Jolene Shepardson (4th season)
- Conference: The American
- Location: Tampa, Florida, US
- Home arena: The Corral (capacity: 1,000)
- Nickname: Bulls
- Colors: Green and gold

AIAW/NCAA tournament appearance
- 1993, 1995, 1996, 1997, 1998, 2000, 2002, 2025

Conference tournament champion
- 1986, 1987, 1988, 1989, 1995, 1996, 2002

Conference regular season champion
- 1983, 1984, 1985, 1986, 1988, 1989, 1993, 1996, 1997, 2000, 2002, 2024

The South Florida Bulls volleyball team represents the University of South Florida in the sport of women's volleyball. The Bulls compete in the American Conference of NCAA Division I. The team plays their home games at The Corral inside the Yuengling Center on USF's campus in Tampa, Florida. They are coached by Jolene Shepardson who was hired after the 2019 season. The Bulls have reached seven NCAA women's volleyball tournaments and won a combined 19 regular season and tournament conference championships in their history, the most of any women's team at USF.

== History ==
Like many women's sports teams in colleges across the country, the USF women's volleyball team was founded in 1972 after the passing of Title IX. The NCAA did not sponsor women's sports at the time, so the Lady Brahmans as they were known until 1987 played in the Association for Intercollegiate Athletics for Women (AIAW) Small College Division (equivalent to NCAA Division II) for their first year and the AIAW Large College Division (equivalent to NCAA Division I) from 1973 until the association dissolved after the spring of 1982.

The Brahmans played as independents as members of the AIAW, as well as during their first year in the National Collegiate Athletic Association (NCAA). They joined USF's men's teams in the Sun Belt Conference before their 1983 season, and they won their first conference championship that year.

The program was very successful in the years directly after they joined the NCAA. In the first 21 seasons after the AIAW's collapse, USF won all of their 11 regular season conference titles and seven conference tournaments, as well as making each of their seven NCAA women's volleyball tournament appearances. They have also made the National Invitational Volleyball Championship (formerly called the Women's Invitational Volleyball Championship) four times, including a quarterfinal appearance in 1994 and semifinal appearance in 2023.

In 1995 the team moved from the old USF Gymnasium, where it had called home since the team was founded in 1972, to The Corral, a volleyball-specific area within the Yuengling Center with a capacity of about 1,000. The Bulls also play some home games on the main floor of the Yuengling Center (used for the men's and women's basketball teams), particularly rivalry games and games against ranked opponents.

The Bulls won their first conference title in 22 years in the 2024 season, and reached the NCAA tournament in 2025 for the first time since 2002.

== Season-by-season results ==
Year	Conference	Games played	Record	Win percentage	Conference record	Head coach	Postseason
1972	Independent (AIAW Small College Division)	18	10–8	.556	N/A	Janie Cheatham	
1973	Independent (AIAW Large College Division)	32	20–12	.625	N/A	Janie Cheatham	
1974	Independent (AIAW Large College Division)	23	15–8	.652	N/A	Janie Cheatham	
1975	Independent (AIAW Large College Division)	30	19–11	.633	N/A	Janie Cheatham	
1976	Independent (AIAW Large College Division)	32	16–16	.500	N/A	Cyndi Miranda	
1977	Independent (AIAW Large College Division)	42	25–17	.595	N/A	Kathy Patrick	
1978	Independent (AIAW Large College Division)	32	9–23	.281	N/A	Rich Romine	
1979	Independent (AIAW Large College Division)	42	19–23	.452	N/A	Mary Beth Hood (first 30 games; 15–15); Hildred Deese (final 12 games; 4–8)	
1980	Independent (AIAW Large College Division)	35	14–21	.400	N/A	Hildred Deese	
1981	Independent (AIAW Large College Division)	38	23–13–2	.632	N/A	Hildred Deese	
1982	Independent (NCAA Division I)	35	17–18	.486	N/A	Hildred Deese	
1983	Sun Belt Conference	42	22–20	.524	7–2	Hildred Deese	
1984	Sun Belt Conference	38	26–12	.684	13–2	Debbie Richardson	
1985	Sun Belt Conference	44	26–18	.591	11–3	Debbie Richardson	
1986	Sun Belt Conference	47	34–13	.723	**10–0**	Debbie Richardson	
1987	Sun Belt Conference	50	29–21	.580	**11–5**	Debbie Richardson	
1988	Sun Belt Conference	35	25–10	.714	**9–1**	Debbie Richardson	
1989	Sun Belt Conference	41	22–19	.537	**8–1**	Debbie Richardson	WIVC (first round)
1990	Sun Belt Conference	42	18–24	.429	6–5	Debbie Richardson	
1991	Metro Conference	35	18–17	.514	3–3	Perry Hankins	
1992	Metro Conference	27	15–12	.556	4–2	Perry Hankins	
1993	Metro Conference	30	23–7	.767	6–0	Perry Hankins	NCAA (first round)
1994	Metro Conference	37	28–9	.757	5–1	Perry Hankins	NIVC (quarterfinal)
1995	Conference USA	32	27–5	.844	**11–1**	Perry Hankins	NCAA (first round)
1996	Conference USA	32	27–5	.844	**13–1**	Perry Hankins	NCAA (first round)
1997	Conference USA	35	26–9	.743	15–1	Perry Hankins	NCAA (second round)
1998	Conference USA	33	25–8	.758	13–3	Perry Hankins	NCAA (first round)
1999	Conference USA	33	15–18	.455	7–9	Nancy Mueller	
2000	Conference USA	34	28–6	.824	15–1	Nancy Mueller	NCAA (first round)
2001	Conference USA	30	21–9	.700	13–3	Nancy Mueller	
2002	Conference USA	37	30–7	.811	**12–1**	Nancy Mueller	NCAA (second round)
2003	Conference USA	32	12–20	.375	6–7	Nancy Mueller	
2004	Conference USA	29	9–20	.310	5–8	Claire Lessinger	
2005	Big East	26	4–22	.154	1–13	Claire Lessinger	
2006	Big East	29	12–17	.414	7–7	Claire Lessinger	
2007	Big East	29	19–10	.655	8–6	Claire Lessinger	
2008	Big East	31	17–14	.548	7–7	Claire Lessinger	
2009	Big East	28	18–10	.643	9–5	Claire Lessinger	
2010	Big East	28	10–18	.357	6–8	Claire Lessinger	
2011	Big East	28	12–16	.429	7–7	Claire Lessinger	
2012	Big East	32	17–15	.531	7–8	Courtney Draper	
2013	American Conference	32	17–15	.531	11–7	Courtney Draper	
2014	American Conference	32	14–18	.438	8–12	Courtney Draper	
2015	American Conference	32	11–21	.344	8–12	Courtney Draper	
2016	American Conference	32	19–13	.594	10–10	Courtney Draper	
2017	American Conference	30	12–18	.400	7–13	Courtney Draper	
2018	American Conference	32	20–12	.625	9–9	Courtney Draper	NIVC (first round)
2019	American Conference	30	7–23	.233	1–15	Courtney Draper	
2020	American Conference	14	6–8	.429	3–5	Jolene Shepardson	
2021	American Conference	31	7–24	.226	1–19	Jolene Shepardson	
2022	American Conference	30	10–20	.333	4–14	Jolene Shepardson	
2023	American Conference	34	22–12	.647	13–6	Jolene Shepardson	NIVC (semifinal)
Total		1714	951–761–2	.555	330–243		11 Appearances
Bold indicates tournament won Italics indicate Conference Championship

== USF Athletic Hall of Fame ==
Two former volleyball players are members of the University of South Florida Athletic Hall of Fame. Michelle Collier played from 1998 to 2002, owns seven school records, and has her number 10 jersey hanging from the rafters in The Corral. She was inducted in 2011. Erika Berggren played from 1993–96 and was named conference player of the year twice. She was inducted in 2022.

== Media ==
Under the current American Conference TV deal, all home and in-conference away volleyball games are shown on one of the various ESPN networks or streamed live on ESPN+. Live radio broadcasts of games are also available worldwide for free on the Bulls Unlimited digital radio station on TuneIn.

== See also ==
- University of South Florida
- South Florida Bulls
- South Florida Bulls beach volleyball
