= 2017 National Invitational Volleyball Championship =

Tournament details
- Dates: November 28–December 12, 2017
- Teams: 32

Final positions
- Champions: Mississippi "Ole Miss" Rebels
- Runners-up: Texas Tech Red Raiders

Tournament statistics
- Matches played: 31

Awards
- Best player: Emily Stroup, Ole Miss

The 2017 National Invitational Volleyball Championship began on Tuesday, November 28, 2017 and concluded on Tuesday, December 12. The first 15 automatic qualifying teams were announced on Sunday, November 21, and the full field was announced after the NCAA Tournament selection show on the night of Sunday, November 26. All games were played at on-campus sites, and the finals were streamed live on ESPN3.

Originally announced as featuring 64 teams, the inaugural tournament was limited to 32 teams.

The University of Mississippi's "Ole Miss" Rebels hosted one of the eight regional tournaments, where they defeated Stephen F. Austin 3–0 and Arkansas State 3–1. While remaining a host team through the rest of the tournament, Ole Miss downed Georgia 3–0 in the quarterfinals, West Virginia 3–0 in the semifinals, and Texas Tech 3–0 in the championship match.

== Qualifying Teams ==
Automatic qualifications (AQ) were granted to the best team from each of the 32 conferences that was not invited to the 2017 NCAA Division I women's volleyball tournament. An automatic qualifier from any conference that declined a bid vacated the qualifier for that conference. Invitations were declined by nine teams and/or their conferences. Three conferences were given at-large bids but no AQs, based on criteria set by Triple Crown Sports. Vacancies were filled by at-large bids offered to the teams with the highest RPI, regardless of conference or geographic location. Teams were assigned to four-team geographic regionals that met at on-campus sites.

=== Automatic qualifiers ===
| RPI | School | Conference | Record | RPI | School | Conference | Record |
| 47 | North Texas | C-USA | 28–3 | 57 | Georgia | SEC | 19–10 |
| 65 | ~~Charleston~~ * Towson | Colonial | ~~27–5~~; 26–5 | 69 | Texas State | Sun Belt | 24–9 |
| 72 | West Virginia | Big 12 | 16–12 | 76 | Temple | American | 17–9 |
| 78 | Sacramento State | Big Sky | 26–9 | 79 | UC Irvine | Big West | 21–7 |
| 87 | Wyoming | Mountain West | 17–13 | 88 | Illinois State | MVC | 20–11 |
| 90 | SIU Edwardsville | Ohio Valley | 23–6 | 98 | Pacific | West Coast | 16–13 |
| 100 | Syracuse | ACC | 19–12 | 101 | Stephen F. Austin | Southland | 26–7 |
| 107 | Oral Roberts | Summit | 15–13 | 123 | Bowling Green | MAC | 17–11 |
| 157 | Campbell | Big South | 20–11 | 160 | Albany | America East | 11–14 |
| 220 | Maryland Eastern Shore | MEAC | 27–8 | 312 | Alabama A&M | SWAC | 14–19 |
| — | No AQ, 2 At-Large bids | Horizon | | — | No AQ, 1 At-Large bid | Patriot | |
| — | No AQ, 1 At-Large bid | Patriot | | — | Conference and/or team declined invitation | ASUN | — |
| — | Conference and/or team declined invitation | A10 | — | — | Conference and/or team declined invitation | Big East | — |
| — | Conference and/or team declined invitation | Big Ten | — | — | Conference and/or team declined invitation | Ivy | — |
| — | Conference and/or team declined invitation | MAAC | — | — | Conference and/or team declined invitation | NEC | — |
| — | Conference and/or team declined invitation | Pac-12 | — | — | Conference and/or team declined invitation | WAC | — |

- * = College of Charleston, one of the first 15 announced AQs received an at-large invitation to the NCAA tournament and was replaced by Towson.

=== At-large bids ===
| RPI | School | Conference | Record | RPI | School | Conference | Record |
| 73 | Rice | C-USA | 21–8 | 77 | SMU | American | 20–9 |
| 80 | TCU | Big 12 | 11–16 | 82 | Ole Miss | SEC | 17–14 |
| 86 | UCF | American | 17–13 | 89 | Boise State | Mountain West | 17–13 |
| 96 | Arkansas State | Sun Belt | 20–11 | 104 | Green Bay | Horizon | 15–15 |
| 108 | Colgate | Patriot | 18–10 | 110 | IUPUI | Horizon | 16–14 |
| 118 | Texas Tech | Big 12 | 15–13 | 127 | UNC Greensboro | SoCon | 19-11 |

== Brackets ==
Source=

All games were played at campus sites. The sixteen first and eight second round regional tournament games were played November 28–December 1, 2017. Four quarterfinal games were played December 3–6. The two semifinal games were played December 7–9. The final game was played at 7 p.m. Eastern Time on Tuesday, December 12 and live-streamed on ESPN3.

Regions († = host)
| Stockton, CA November 28–29 | Athens, GA November 28–29 | Morgantown, WV November 28–29 | Oxford, MS November 29–30 |
|---|---|---|---|
| Pacific Tigers (16–13) † | Georgia Lady Bulldogs (19–10) † | West Virginia Mountaineers (16–12) † | Ole Miss Rebels (17–14) † |
| Boise State Broncos (17–13) | Alabama A&M Lady Bulldogs (14–19) | Maryland Eastern Shore Hawks (27–8) | Stephen F. Austin Ladyjacks (26–7) |
| Sacramento State Hornets (26–9) | UNC Greensboro Spartans (19–11) | Campbell Lady Camels (20–11) | Arkansas State Red Wolves (20–11) |
| UC Irvine Anteaters (21–7) | UCF Knights (17–13) | Temple Owls (17–9) | SIU Edwardsville Cougars (23–6) |
| Denton, TX November 30–December 1 | Green Bay, WI November 30–December 1 | San Marcos, TX November 30–December 1 | Hamilton, NY November 30–December 1 |
| North Texas Mean Green (28–3) † | Green Bay Phoenix (15–15) † | Texas State Bobcats (24–9) † | Colgate Raiders (18–10) † |
| Oral Roberts Golden Eagles (15–13) | Bowling Green Falcons (17–11) | Rice Owls (21–8) | Towson Tigers (26–5) |
| Wyoming Cowgirls (17–13) | IUPUI Jaguars (16–14) | Texas Tech Red Raiders (15–13) | Albany Great Danes (11–14) |
| TCU Horned Frogs (11–16) | Illinois State Redbirds (20–11) | SMU Mustangs (20–9) | Syracuse Orange (19–12) |

| Quarterfinal Sites | | | Semifinal sites | | Final site |
| Oxford, MS Sunday, December 3 1 PM CST | Morgantown, WV Monday, December 4 6 PM EST | Fort Worth, TX (2 games) Wednesday, December 6 4 PM & 7 PM CST | Fort Worth, TX Thursday, December 7 7 PM CST | Oxford, MS Saturday, December 9 4:30 PM CST | Oxford, MS Tuesday, December 12 7 PM EST |

First Round; November 28–30
H | North Texas | 3
v | Oral Roberts | 1
h | Wyoming | 0
v | Texas Christian | 3
H | Green Bay | 3
v | Bowling Green | 2
h | Illinois State | 3
v | IUPUI | 0
H | Pacific | 3
v | Boise State | 0
h | UC Irvine | 3
v | Sacramento State | 0
H | Texas State | 3
v | Rice | 0
h | Southern Methodist | 0
v | Texas Tech | 3
H | Georgia | 3
v | Alabama A&M | 0
h | Central Florida | 3
v | UNC Greensboro | 0
H | Mississippi | 3
v | Stephen F. Austin | 0
h | SIU Edwardsville | 1
v | Arkansas State | 3
H | West Virginia | 3
v | Maryland Eastern Shore | 0
h | Temple | 3
v | Campbell | 0
H | Colgate | 2
v | Towson | 3
h | Syracuse | 3
v | Albany | 1

Second Round; November 29–December 1
North Texas | 2
Texas Christian | 3
Green Bay | 3
Illinois State | 1
Pacific | 2
UC Irvine | 3
Texas State | 0
Texas Tech | 3
Georgia | 3
Central Florida | 0
Mississippi | 3
Arkansas State | 1
West Virginia | 3
Temple | 0
Syracuse | 3
Towson | 0

Quarterfinals; December 3–6
Texas Christian | 3
Green Bay | 0
UC Irvine | 1
Texas Tech | 3
Georgia | 0
Mississippi | 3
West Virginia | 3
Syracuse | 0

Semifinals; December 8–10
Texas Christian | 1
Texas Tech | 3
Mississippi | 3
West Virginia | 0

Final; December 12
Texas Tech | 0
Ole Miss | 3

- H = host; h = home team; v = visitor

== All-tournament team ==
Source =

| Player | School | Class | Hometown (High school) |
|---|---|---|---|
| Emily Stroup (MVP) | Ole Miss | Sophomore | Fargo, ND (Fargo South) |
| Kate Gibson | Ole Miss | Senior | Sedalia, CO (Valor Christian) |
| Caroline Adams | Ole Miss | Junior | Lafayette, LA (St. Thomas More Catholic) |
| Missy Owens | Texas Tech | RS Junior | Yorba Linda, CA (Yorba Linda) |
| Kate Klepetka | Texas Tech | RS Senior | Allen, TX (Allen) |
| Mia Swanegan | West Virginia | Senior | Blue Springs, MO (Blue Springs South) |
| Anna Walsh | TCU | Junior | Grapevine, TX (Colleyville Heritage) |
