= Houston Cougars women's volleyball =

American college volleyball team

- Founded: 1967; 59 years ago
- University: University of Houston
- Head coach: David Rehr (8th season)
- Conference: Big 12
- Location: Houston, Texas, US
- Home arena: Fertitta Center (capacity: 7,100)
- Nickname: Cougars
- Colors: Scarlet and white

AIAW/NCAA tournament semifinal
- 1974, 1975

AIAW/NCAA Regional Final
- 1972, 1973, 1974, 1975, 1976, 1979, 1994

AIAW/NCAA regional semifinal
- 1994, 2022

AIAW/NCAA tournament appearance
- 1972, 1973, 1974, 1975, 1976, 1977, 1979, 1980, 1989, 1991, 1992, 1993, 1994, 1995, 1996, 1997, 1998, 1999, 2000, 2022, 2023

Conference tournament champion
- 1994, 1997

Conference regular season champion
- 1994, 1999, 2022

The Houston Cougars women's volleyball program represents the University of Houston in National Collegiate Athletic Association (NCAA) Division I. The Cougars compete in the Big 12 Conference and play their home games on Houston's main campus in Houston, Texas at the Fertitta Center.

== Conference affiliations ==
- Texas Association for Intercollegiate Athletics for Women (1967–1981)
- Southwest Conference (1982–1995)
- Conference USA (1996–2012)
- American Athletic Conference (2013–2022)
- Big 12 Conference (2023–present)

== Head coaches ==
Tenure	Coach	Overall Record
1967–1973	Martha Hawthorne	N/A (Note: Records prior to 1974 are unavailable.)
1974–1980	Ruth Nelson	290–84–3 (.773)
1981–1985	Dave Olbright	102–101–2 (.502)
1986–2009	Bill Walton	458–319 (.589)
2010–2011	Molly Alvey	38–24 (.613)
2012–2018	Kaddie Platt	94–123 (.433)
2019–present	David Rehr	115–60 (.657)

Notes: Through 2024 season.

== See also ==
- List of NCAA Division I women's volleyball programs
