= National Invitational Volleyball Championship =

Women's college volleyball tournament

- Sport: College Volleyball
- Founded: 1989
- Founder: American Volleyball Coaches Association
- No. of teams: 32
- Most recent champion: Arizona (2024)
- Most titles: Wisconsin (2)
- Broadcaster: ESPN3
- Related competitions: NCAA Division I Women's Volleyball Championship
- Website: http://www.womensnivc.com

The National Invitational Volleyball Championship (NIVC) is an NCAA Division I women's college volleyball postseason tournament sponsored by the American Volleyball Coaches Association (AVCA) and operated by Triple Crown Sports. Its original incarnation ran from 1989–95. After a 22-year hiatus, it was revived in 2017. In 2025, it was announced that the tournament was being suspended.

== History ==
The NCAA began sponsoring women's college volleyball championships in 1981, replacing the AIAW as the highest-level governing body for the sport. The 1981 tournament consisted of 20 teams.

In the first few years, the NCAA field was composed largely of teams from the southwest and west coast, but the sport grew in nationwide popularity in the 1980s. By 1988, the NCAA tournament had expanded to 32 teams. However, there were 29 women's volleyball conferences in 1988 and only 16 were represented in the tournament.

The idea for the National Invitational Volleyball Championship was hatched that fall by a trio of volleyball coaches from schools belonging to unrepresented conferences: Brenda Williams from UAB, Charlie Daniel from Western Kentucky, and Geri Polvino from Eastern Kentucky. Williams and Polvino were frustrated that their teams had each won conference titles but could not play postseason volleyball because the NCAA didn't invite them, so they created a second-tier postseason volleyball tournament, the Women's Invitational Volleyball Championship, to debut in 1989.

The 1989 tournament was held in four regional pools of four teams each, with a playoff for the pool winners. Wisconsin won the trophy that year, and the idea was such a success that the next year's tournament was held at the University of Tennessee, an extra team was added to each pool, and attendance increased tenfold from 500 to 5,000. In 1991, the tournament was renamed the National Invitational Volleyball Championship, and by 1992 it was so popular that it was moved to the Municipal Auditorium in Kansas City, a 7,300-seat arena. The NIVC held its tournament there for the last four years of its initial existence.

By 1993, however, the NCAA Tournament had expanded to 48 teams, and the next year it introduced play-in games, which allowed nearly every conference champion a spot in the tournament. The NIVC felt it had done its job in kindling national interest in the sport, and its tournament folded after 1995, sitting dormant for the next 22 years.

However, by 2016, many in the sport felt there could be a market for a second-tier volleyball tournament. Regular-season champions in smaller conferences are often not given postseason bids if they don't win their conference tournament, despite outstanding regular seasons, such as the 2005 Albany (28–4), 2009 Southern Miss (27–5), or 2010 Ball State (24–5) teams. Also, there are many larger conferences with large fan bases that only send a few teams to the tournament each year—for example, the Atlantic Coast Conference regularly sends only three or four teams to the NCAA Tournament, disappointing the fans of other teams that might also have had successful seasons. In December 2016, the tournament was revived as a 32-team tournament, scheduled for its second debut in November 2017. The new tournament is run by Triple Crown Sports, which has run basketball's WNIT for the past two decades and also started a National Invitational Softball Championship in spring 2017.

The 2020 tournament was cancelled due to the COVID-19 pandemic, which emerged in the United States in early 2020.

== Selection process ==
The new NIVC consists of 32 teams that did not make the NCAA Tournament. This includes automatic qualifications for the best team from each of the 32 conferences to not be invited to the NCAA Tournament, with any vacancies filled by at-large bids to the teams with the highest RPI, regardless of conference or geographic location. The field is grouped into 4-team regionals based on geographic location. The full field was announced a few hours after the actual NCAA selection show on the night of Sunday, November 26, although some automatic bids were announced earlier.

== Champions ==
National Invitational Volleyball Championship
Year	Host city (University)	Host Arena	Final			Semifinalists
Year	Host city (University)	Host Arena	Winner	Score	Runner-up	Semifinalists
1989	Birmingham, Alabama (UAB)	Bartow Arena	Wisconsin (26–11)	3–1	Boise State	Pittsburgh; William & Mary
1990	Knoxville, Tennessee (Tennessee)	Thompson-Boling Arena	Houston (24–15)	3–1	Cal State Northridge	Memphis; Georgia
1991	Fairborn, Ohio (Wright State)	Nutter Center	Kentucky (24–13)	3–2	Notre Dame	Santa Clara; Miami (OH)
1992	Kansas City, Missouri (Kansas State)	Municipal Auditorium	Washington State (27–10)	3–0	Bowling Green	Northern Illinois; Minnesota
1993	Kansas City, Missouri (Kansas State)	Municipal Auditorium	LSU (21–16)	3–0	Baylor	Utah; Northern Iowa
1994	Kansas City, Missouri (Kansas State)	Municipal Auditorium	Cal State Northridge (23–8)	3–1	San Jose State	Iowa State; San Diego
1995	Kansas City, Missouri (Kansas State)	Municipal Auditorium	Wisconsin (22–15)	3–2	Sacramento State	San Diego; Rhode Island
No tournament held 1996–2016
2017	Oxford, Mississippi	Gillom Athletics Performance Center	Ole Miss (22–14)	3–0	Texas Tech	West Virginia; Texas Christian
2018	Ames, Iowa	Hilton Coliseum	Iowa State (21–13)	3–0	Tulane	UNLV; College of Charleston
2019	Vermillion, South Dakota	Sanford Coyote Sports Center	Georgia Tech (26–8)	3–0	South Dakota	Tulsa; TCU
2020	Canceled due to COVID-19					
2021	Valparaiso, Indiana	Athletics-Recreation Center	UNLV (28–9)	3–0	Valparaiso	UTEP; UConn
2022	Des Moines, Iowa	Knapp Center	Boston College (24–13)	3–1	Drake	Davidson; Southern Miss
2023	El Paso, Texas	Memorial Gym	Wichita State (21-8)	3–0	UTEP	Montana State; South Florida
2024	Tucson, Arizona	McKale Center	Arizona (24-9)	3–2	Bowling Green	Northern Colorado; St. John's
No tournament held 2025
