= United States Professional Volleyball League =

- Sport: Volleyball
- Founded: 2002
- Ceased: 2002
- No. of teams: 4
- Country: United States
- Last champion(s): Minnesota Chill

The United States Professional Volleyball League (USPV) was a women's professional volleyball league which existed for one season in 2002. Four teams competed, all in the midwest: the Chicago Thunder, Minnesota Chill, Grand Rapids Force, and St. Louis Quest. The league was founded by William Kennedy. His daughter, Kelly, would play for the Chicago team. The Minnesota Chill beat the Chicago Thunder in a best of 5 series to become the league's only champion.

The league was planning to come back in 2003 with 4 more teams in Milwaukee, Columbus (Ohio), Dallas and Philadelphia. Those plans were scuttled though, and a 4-team schedule was planned with the same four teams from the 2002 season. Financial backing was not forthcoming leading into the 2003 season though, and the season was cancelled.
