= 2020–21 BYU Cougars women's volleyball team =

American college volleyball season

2020–21 BYU Cougars women's volleyball

WCC regular season champion

NCAA, Regional semifinals
- Conference: West Coast Conference
- Record: 17–2 (15–1 WCC)
- Head coach: Heather Olmstead (6th season)
- Assistant coaches: David Hyte (7th season); Jonny Neeley (5th season)
- Home arena: Smith Fieldhouse

The 2020–21 BYU Cougars women's volleyball team represented Brigham Young University in the 2020–21 NCAA Division I women's volleyball season. The Cougars were led by sixth year head coach Heather Olmstead and played their home games at the Smith Fieldhouse. The Cougars were members of the WCC.

BYU came off a season where they finished second in the WCC regular season championship. The Cougars received an at-large bid and once again participated in the NCAA tournament before falling to Utah in the second round.

Due to the COVID-19 coronavirus, the 2020 fall season was delayed until winter/spring, and the Cougars were scheduled to play a conference only schedule. However, when the Santa Clara series was postponed, BYU was able to set up a non-conference match with Utah Valley.

2021 West Coast Conference spring volleyball standings
	Conf.				Overall
Team	W		L	PCT	W		L	PCT
No. 14 BYU ‍†‍‍^{y}	15	–	1	.938	17	–	2	.895
No. 20 Pepperdine ‍‍‍^{y}	14	–	2	.875	17	–	4	.810
No. 21 San Diego ‍‍‍^{y}	12	–	4	.750	13	–	5	.722
Loyola Marymount ‍‍‍	7	–	9	.438	7	–	9	.438
Saint Mary's ‍‍‍	6	–	10	.375	7	–	10	.412
San Francisco ‍‍‍	5	–	10	.333	7	–	10	.412
Gonzaga ‍‍‍	5	–	10	.333	6	–	11	.353
Santa Clara ‍‍‍	4	–	11	.267	5	–	12	.294
Pacific ‍‍‍	2	–	7	.222	2	–	7	.222
Portland ‍‍‍	2	–	13	.133	2	–	13	.133
† – Conference champion y – Invited to the NCAA Tournament; Pacific suspended their season on March 15, 2021. Rankings from AVCA; Source:West Coast Conference

== Season highlights ==
Will be filled in as the season progresses.

== Roster ==
2020–21 BYU Cougars roster
Defensive Specialist/Libero: 3 Morgan Bower - Sophomore; 17 Grace Wee - Sophomore; 18 Madi Allen - Freshman; Opposite hitters: 12 Kate Grimmer - Sophomore; 14 Makayla Tolman - Freshman	Outside hitters: 1 Taylen Ballard-Nixon - Senior; 4 Leilani Dodson - Freshman; 11 Abbey Dayton - Sophomore; 13 Morgan Johnson - (redshirt) Freshman; 14 Makayla Tolman - Freshman	Setters: 7 Whitney Bower - Sophomore; 8 Tayler Tausinga - Junior; Middle blockers: 16 Allie Hakes - Freshman; 21 Whitney Llarenas - (redshirt) Sophomore; 24 Kennedy Eschenberg - (redshirt) Senior

== Schedule ==
Date Time	Opponent	Rank^{(Tournament Seed)}	Arena City (Tournament)	Television	Result	Attendance	Record (WCC Record)
1/26; 1 p.m.	@ Portland*	#16	Chiles Center; Portland, OR	WCC Network	W 3–0 (25–9, 25–22, 25–17)	0	1–0 (1–0)
1/27; 1 p.m.	@ Portland*	#16	Chiles Center; Portland, OR	WCC Network	W 3–0 (25–23, 26–24, 25–22)	0	2–0 (2–0)
02/02; 7 p.m.	Santa Clara*	#14	Smith Fieldhouse; Provo, UT	BYUtv	PPD- COVID-19 cases at Santa Clara		
02/03; 7 p.m.	Santa Clara*	#14	Smith Fieldhouse; Provo, UT	BYUtv	PPD- COVID-19 cases at Santa Clara		
2/04; 6 p.m.	@ Utah Valley	#14	Lockhart Arena; Orem, UT (UCCU Crosstown Clash)	WAC DN	W 3–1 (25–17, 22–25, 25–20, 25–20)	260	3–0
2/09; 6 p.m.	Gonzaga*	#12	Smith Fieldhouse; Provo, UT	BYUtv.org	W 3–1 (25–17, 23–25, 25–12, 25–17)	150	4–0 (3–0)
2/10; 4 p.m.	Gonzaga*	#12	Smith Fieldhouse; Provo, UT	BYUtv.org	W 3–0 (25–19, 25–22, 25–22)	150	5–0 (4–0)
2/16; 7 p.m.	Loyola Marymount*	#12	Smith Fieldhouse; Provo, UT	BYUtv	W 3–0 (25–21, 25–20, 25–19)	150	6–0 (5–0)
2/17; 7 p.m.	Loyola Marymount*	#12	Smith Fieldhouse; Provo, UT	BYUtv.org	W 3–0 (25–17, 27–25, 25–23)	150	7–0 (6–0)
2/23; 8 p.m.	@ Pepperdine*	#12	Firestone Fieldhouse; Malibu, CA	WCC Network	L 0–3 (20–25, 16–25, 19–25)	0	7–1 (6–1)
2/24; 8 p.m.	@ Pepperdine*	#12	Firestone Fieldhouse; Malibu, CA	WCC Network	W 3–2 (24–26, 25–23, 19–25, 25–21, 15–13)	0	8–1 (7–1)
3/05; 2 p.m.	@ San Francisco*	#15	The Sobrato Center; San Francisco, CA	WCC Network	W 3–0 (25–23, 25–20, 25–21)	0	9–1 (8–1)
3/06; 2 p.m.	@ San Francisco*	#15	The Sobrato Center; San Francisco, CA	WCC Network	W 3–1 (25–15, 20–25, 26–24, 25–18)	0	10–1 (9–1)
03/12; 1 p.m.	Pacific*	#15	Smith Fieldhouse; Provo, UT	BYUtv	Canceled- COVID-19 cases at Pacific		
03/13; 1 p.m.	Pacific*	#15	Smith Fieldhouse; Provo, UT	BYUtv	Canceled- COVID-19 cases at Pacific		
03/17; 2 p.m.	@ #21 San Diego*	#16	Jenny Craig Pavilion; San Diego, CA	WCC Network	W 3–1 (25–20, 25–20, 19–25, 25–17)	1	11–1 (10–1)
03/20; 1 p.m.	#21 San Diego*	#16	Smith Fieldhouse; Provo, UT	BYUtv	W 3–0 (25–19, 25–21, 25–17)	550	12–1 (11–1)
03/26; 5 p.m.	@ Saint Mary's*	#15	University Credit Union Pavilion; Moraga, CA	WCC Network	W 3–0 (25–17, 25–15, 26–24)	0	13–1 (12–1)
03/27; 4 p.m.	@ Saint Mary's*	#15	University Credit Union Pavilion; Moraga, CA	WCC Network	W 3–0 (25–19, 25–23, 25–21)	0	14–1 (13–1)
03/30; 1 p.m.	Santa Clara*	#14	Smith Fieldhouse; Provo, UT	BYUtv.org	W 3–0 (25–18, 25–20, 25–11)	400	15–1 (14–1)
03/31; 1 p.m.	Santa Clara*	#14	Smith Fieldhouse; Provo, UT	BYUtv.org	W 3–0 (25–18, 25–16, 25–9)	400	16–1 (15–1)
04/15; 8:30 p.m.	y- #15 UCLA	#14^{(16)}	CHI Health Center Omaha Convention Center Court 4 Omaha, NE (NCAA 2nd Round)	ESPN3	W 3–0 (26–24, 31–29, 25–17)	0	17–1 (15–1)
04/17; 6:00 p.m.	y- #1 ^{(1)} Wisconsin	#14^{(16)}	CHI Health Center Omaha Convention Center Court 3 Omaha, NE (NCAA regional semifinal)	ESPN3	L 0–3 (20–25, 17–25, 12–25)	0	17–2 (15–1)

*-Indicates Conference Opponent
y-Indicates NCAA Playoffs
Times listed are Mountain Time Zone.

== Announcers for televised games ==
All home games will be on BYUtv or the BYUtv App. All road game will also be televised or streamed on WCC Network.

- Portland: No commentary
- Portland: No commentary
- Utah Valley: Matthew Baiamonte & Kayli Doxey
- Gonzaga: Jarom Jordan (Set 1), Spencer Linton (Sets 2–4), & Amy Gant
- Gonzaga: Spencer Linton & Amy Gant
- Loyola Marymount: Spencer Linton & Amy Gant
- Loyola Marymount: Spencer Linton & Amy Gant
- Pepperdine: Al Epstein
- Pepperdine: Al Epstein
- San Francisco: Charlie Walter
- San Francisco: Charlie Walter
- San Diego: Jack Cronin
- San Diego: Jarom Jordan & Amy Gant
- Saint Mary's: Charlie Walter
- Saint Mary's: Ben Ross
- Santa Clara: Jarom Jordan & Amy Gant
- Santa Clara: Jarom Jordan & Amy Gant
- UCLA: Paul Sunderland
- Wisconsin: Tyler Denning & Jenny Hazelwood
