= 2022 BYU Cougars women's volleyball team =

2022 BYU Cougars women's volleyball
- Conference: West Coast Conference
- Record: 22–7 (15–3 WCC)
- Head coach: Heather Olmstead (8th season)
- Assistant coaches: David Hyte (9th season); Jonny Neeley (7th season)
- Home arena: Smith Fieldhouse

2022 West Coast Conference volleyball standings
	Conf.				Overall
Team	W		L	PCT	W		L	PCT
No. 4 San Diego ‍‍‍	9	–	0	1.000	18	–	1	.947
No. 17 BYU ‍‍‍	7	–	2	.778	14	–	5	.737
Loyola Marymount ‍‍‍	7	–	2	.778	11	–	6	.647
No. 22 Pepperdine ‍‍‍	6	–	3	.667	15	–	5	.750
Pacific ‍‍‍	4	–	5	.444	12	–	9	.571
Santa Clara ‍‍‍	4	–	5	.444	8	–	13	.381
San Francisco ‍‍‍	3	–	6	.333	10	–	10	.500
Saint Mary's ‍‍‍	3	–	6	.333	6	–	11	.353
Portland ‍‍‍	2	–	7	.222	9	–	11	.450
Gonzaga ‍‍‍	0	–	9	.000	4	–	16	.200
† – Conference champion y – Invited to the NCAA Tournament; Rankings from AVCA; Source:West Coast Conference

The 2022 BYU Cougars women's volleyball team represented Brigham Young University in the 2022 NCAA Division I women's volleyball season. The Cougars were led by eighth year head coach Heather Olmstead and played their home games at the Smith Fieldhouse. The Cougars were competing as members of the WCC for the final season, as they'll join the Big 12 Conference for 2023.

BYU comes off a season where they finished first and won the WCC regular season championship. The Cougars received an automatic bid to the NCAA Tournament falling to Purdue in the Sweet 16. The Cougars came in as favorites to win the 2022 conference title.

== Season ==
=== Pre-season honors ===
Four Cougars were selected to the Pre-season All-WCC team: Senior setter Whitney Bower, senior middle blocker Heather Gneiting, senior opposite hitter Kate Grimmer and junior outside hitter Erin Livingston. The four selections tied BYU with San Diego for the most 2022 Preseason All-WCC team selections.

=== Alleged Duke incident ===
The 5,507 fans that attended the Duke game set a record for the most fans attending a BYU Women's Volleyball game at the Smith Fieldhouse. More than 1,000 fans were turned away as the only seats empty were some student season ticket seats.

During the Duke-BYU game, with BYU leading 6-3, Duke sophomore Rachel Richardson came up to serve and later recounted that in that moment, she "very distinctly...heard a very strong and negative racial slur." Once the set was over, Richardson informed the Duke coaching staff, who informed the game officials, who informed BYU staffers, who assigned a campus officer to monitor the student section. The officer later wrote an official report outlining his actions, including that he didn't hear any abusive comments during the fourth set. After the game was complete, a Duke assistant coach confronted the officer, pointing to a particular person in the student section and questioned why the person had not been ejected during the game. The officer and BYU officials reviewed game footage to find evidence that the fan shouted a racial slur, found none, but decided to ban the fan from attending BYU events indefinitely until further investigation was completed.

The following day, Richardson’s godmother brought the situation widespread attention when she tweeted that Richardson was called the slur "every time she served." The Duke vs. Rider match was moved from BYU to a local high school where only family and friends of the schools were allowed admittance.

Two days after the incident, having flown back to North Carolina, Richardson tweeted out a statement saying "my fellow African American teammates and I were targeted and racially heckled throughout the entirety of the match. The slurs and comments grew into threats which caused us to feel unsafe." In response, BYU Athletics sent out a general press release outlining the school's official stance on all racism. Duke released a statement supporting the allegations of Richardson. Richardson was interviewed on ESPN where she repeated the allegations.

On September 9, BYU announced it had concluded its investigation into the incident and that it could not corroborate the claims of racism at the match and reinstated the fan who had been banned.

== Roster ==
2022 BYU Cougars roster
Defensive Specialist/Libero: 3 Morgan Clinger - Senior; 4 Hannah Billeter - Freshman; 11 Abbey Dayton - Senior; 14 Aria McComber - Graduate; 16 Kelsey Knudsen - Graduate; Opposite hitters: 12 Kate Grimmer - Senior	Outside hitters: 8 Eden Bower- Freshman; 9 Alyssa Montoya - Sophomore; 10 Erin Livingston - Junior; 15 Elyse Stowell - Sophomore; 19 Nataly Moravec - Freshman; 22 Sophia Callahan - Sophomore	Setters: 6 Abby Taylor - Senior; 7 Whitney Bower - Senior; 13 Briley Decker - Freshman; Middle blockers: 1 Kate Prior - Freshman; 2 Heather Gneiting - Senior; 5 Bri Albright - Sophomore; 21 Whitney Llarenas - Graduate

== Schedule ==
Date Time	Opponent	Rank^{(Tournament Seed)}	Arena City (Tournament)	Television	Result	Attendance	Record (WCC Record)
08/26; 12 p.m.	Rider	#10	Smith Fieldhouse; Provo, UT (dōTERRA Classic)	byutv.org	W 3–0 (25–10, 25–17, 25–16)	1,018	1—0
08/26; 7 p.m.	Duke	#10	Smith Fieldhouse; Provo, UT (dōTERRA Classic)	BYUtv	W 3–1 (25–14, 25–19, 19–25, 25–19)	5,507	2—0
08/27; 7 p.m.	Washington State	#10	Smith Fieldhouse; Provo, UT (dōTERRA Classic)	BYUtv	W 3–0 (25–18, 25–21, 25–15)	3,678	3—0
09/01; 7 p.m.	Utah State	#7	Smith Fieldhouse; Provo, UT (BYU Nike Invitational)	BYUtv	W 3–0 (25–9, 25–17, 25–14)	3,419	4—0
09/02; 7 p.m.	Cincinnati	#7	Smith Fieldhouse; Provo, UT (BYU Nike Invitational)	BYUtv	W 3–1 (25–13, 21–25, 25–14, 25–19)	3,343	5—0
09/03; 7 p.m.	#10 Pitt	#7	Smith Fieldhouse; Provo, UT (BYU Nike Invitational)	BYUtv	L 1–3 (19–25, 22–25, 25–19, 21–25)	3,342	5—1
09/08; 6 p.m.	@ #5 Georgia Tech	#10	O'Keefe Gymnasium; Atlanta, GA (Georgia Tech Challenge)	ACCNX	L 0–3 (20–25, 21–25, 14–25)	1,200	5–2
09/09; 6 p.m.	vs. #8 Ohio State	#10	O'Keefe Gymnasium; Atlanta, GA (Georgia Tech Challenge)		L 0–3 (19–25, 16–25, 25–27)	919	5–3
09/15; 7 p.m.	@ Utah	#15	Huntsman Center; Salt Lake City, UT (Deseret First Duel)	P12	W 3–1 (25–20, 22–25, 28–26, 27–25)	1,905	6–3
09/17; 6 p.m.	Utah Valley	#15	Smith Fieldhouse; Provo, UT (UCCU Crosstown Clash)	byutv.org	W 3–0 (25–16, 25–15, 25–20)	3,018	7–3
09/22; 7 p.m.	Loyola Marymount*	#16	Smith Fieldhouse; Provo, UT	BYUtv	W 3–0 (25–23, 25–18, 25–21)	2,615	8–3 (1–0)
09/24; 1 p.m.	#17 Pepperdine*	#16	Smith Fieldhouse; Provo, UT	BYUtv	W 3–1 (25–12, 18–25, 25–21, 25–22)	3,004	9–3 (2–0)
09/29; 7 p.m.	@ Portland*	#15	Chiles Center; Portland, OR	SCS Central	W 3–0 (25–12, 25–20, 26–24)	339	10–3 (3–0)
10/01; 1 p.m.	@ Gonzaga*	#15	Charlotte Y. Martin Centre; Spokane, WA	SCS Atlantic	W 3–1 (23–25, 25–18, 25–22, 25–22)	581	11–3 (4–0)
10/06; 7 p.m.	Santa Clara*	#14	Smith Fieldhouse; Provo, UT	BYUtv	W 3–0 (25–13, 25–13, 25–12)	3,120	12–3 (5–0)
10/08; 1 p.m.	San Francisco*	#14	Smith Fieldhouse; Provo, UT	BYUtv	W 3–0 (25–20, 25–14, 25–17)	2,656	13–3 (6–0)
10/13; 7 p.m.	@ Saint Mary's*	#12	University Credit Union Pavilion; Moraga, CA	SCS Pacific	W 3–0 (25–18, 25–13, 25–14)	296	14–3 (7–0)
10/15; 1 p.m.	@ Pacific*	#12	Alex G. Spanos Center; Stockton, CA	WCC Network	L 2–3 (21–25, 25–17, 22–25, 25–10, 10–15)	827	14–4 (7–1)
10/21; 7 p.m.	@ #4 San Diego*	#17	Jenny Craig Pavilion; San Diego, CA	SCS Atlantic	L 0–3 (20–25, 21–25, 18–25)	3,340	14–5 (7–2)
10/27; 7 p.m.	Gonzaga*	#17	Smith Fieldhouse; Provo, UT	BYUtv	W 3–0 (25–10, 25–14, 25–21)	2,891	15–5 (8–2)
10/29; 1 p.m.	Portland*	#17	Smith Fieldhouse; Provo, UT	BYUtv	W 3–0 (25–23, 25–19, 25–10)	3,134	16–5 (9–2)
11/03; 8 p.m.	@ San Francisco*	#18	The Sobrato Center; San Francisco, CA	SCS Pacific	W 3–1 (20–25, 25–20, 25–20, 25–16)	350	17–5 (10–2)
11/05; 2 p.m.	@ Santa Clara*	#18	Leavey Center; Santa Clara, CA	WCC Network	W 3–0 (25–15, 25–17, 25–17)	309	18–5 (11–2)
11/10; 7 p.m.	Pacific*	#18	Smith Fieldhouse; Provo, UT	BYUtv	CANCELLED- Pacific forfeited the game 3–0 citing they didn't want to risk playing in a racist environment		18–5 (11–2)
11/12; 1 p.m.	Saint Mary's*	#18	Smith Fieldhouse; Provo, UT	BYUtv	W 3–0 (25–18, 30–28, 25–19)	2,855	19–5 (12–2)
11/17; 8 p.m.	@ Pepperdine*	#17	Firestone Fieldhouse; Malibu, CA	WCC Network	W 3–0 (25–22, 25-21, 25–22)	605	20–5 (13–2)
11/19; 2 p.m.	@ Loyola Marymount*	#17	Gersten Pavilion; Los Angeles, CA	SCS Central	W 3–1 (25–20, 25–20, 14–25, 25–23)	629	21–5 (14–2)
11/22; 8 p.m.	#2 San Diego*	#18	Smith Fieldhouse; Provo, UT	ESPNU	L 1–3 (25–21, 19-25, 22–25, 22–25)	4,677	21–6 (14–3)
12/02; 2 p.m.	y- James Madison	#18^{(7)}	Petersen Events Center; Pittsburgh, PA (NCAA Tournament 1st Round1)	ESPN+	W 3–0 (25–20, 25-10, 25–15)	2,055	22–6
12/03; 5 p.m.	y- #6 Pitt^{(2)}	#18^{(7)}	Petersen Events Center; Pittsburgh, PA (NCAA Tournament 2nd Round)	ESPN+	L 0–3 (21-25, 22–25, 18–25)	2,814	22–7

*-Indicates Conference Opponent
y-Indicates NCAA Playoffs
Times listed are Mountain Time Zone.

== Announcers for televised games ==
All home games will be on BYUtv or the BYUtv App with the exception of San Diego, which will be on ESPNU. Most road games will also be televised or streamed on WCC Network with ACC Network Extra picking up the Georgia Tech game and Pac-12 Network picking up the Utah game.

- Rider: Jarom Jordan & Amy Gant
- Duke: Jarom Jordan, Amy Gant, & Kenzie Koerber
- Washington State: Jarom Jordan, Amy Gant, & Kenzie Koerber
- Utah State: Jarom Jordan, Amy Gant, & Kenzie Koerber
- Cincinnati: Jarom Jordan, Amy Gant, & Kenzie Koerber
- Pitt: Jarom Jordan, Amy Gant, & Kenzie Koerber
- Georgia Tech: Andy Demetra & Kele Eveland
- Utah: Krista Blunk
- Utah Valley: Brandon Crow & Amy Gant
- Loyola Marymount: Jarom Jordan, Amy Gant, & Kenzie Koerber
- Pepperdine: Jarom Jordan, Amy Gant, & Kenzie Koerber
- Portland: Bryan Sleik & Carlie Dumanon
- Gonzaga: Thomas Gallagher
- Santa Clara: Jarom Jordan, Amy Gant, & Kenzie Koerber
- San Francisco: Jarom Jordan, Amy Gant, & Kenzie Koerber
- Saint Mary's: Dr. Joaquin Wallace & Jordan Watkins
- Pacific: Jeff Dominick
- San Diego: David Gentile
- Gonzaga: Jarom Jordan, Amy Gant, & Kenzie Koerber
- Portland: Jarom Jordan, Amy Gant, & Kenzie Koerber
- San Francisco: Pat Olson
- Santa Clara: Kylen Mills
- Saint Mary's: Jarom Jordan, Amy Gant, & Kenzie Koerber
- Pepperdine: Al Epstein
- Loyola Marymount: Jonathan Grace
- San Diego: Paul Sunderland & Kevin Barnett
- James Madison: Jeff Hathhorn & Amanda Silay
- Pitt: Jeff Hathhorn & Amanda Silay
