= 2016 BYU Cougars women's volleyball team =

American college volleyball season

2016 BYU Cougars women's volleyball

WCC regular season Champs

NCAA, Regional semifinals
- Conference: West Coast Conference
- Record: 29–4 (16–2 WCC)
- Head coach: Heather Olmstead (2nd season)
- Assistant coaches: David Hyte (3rd season); Jonny Neeley (1st season)
- Home arena: Smith Fieldhouse

2016 West Coast Conference volleyball standings
	Conf.				Overall
Team	W		L	PCT	W		L	PCT
No. 8 BYU ‍†‍‍^{y}	16	–	2	.889	29	–	4	.879
No. 22 San Diego ‍‍‍^{y}	15	–	3	.833	24	–	6	.800
Loyola Marymount ‍‍‍	10	–	8	.556	19	–	11	.633
Gonzaga ‍‍‍	10	–	8	.556	17	–	11	.607
Portland ‍‍‍	10	–	8	.556	17	–	13	.567
Pacific ‍‍‍	9	–	9	.500	15	–	15	.500
Santa Clara ‍‍‍	7	–	11	.389	16	–	14	.533
Pepperdine ‍‍‍	7	–	11	.389	13	–	17	.433
Saint Mary's ‍‍‍	6	–	12	.333	11	–	18	.379
San Francisco ‍‍‍	0	–	18	.000	4	–	27	.129
† – Conference champion y- Invited to the NCAA volleyball tournament As of 2016-12-19; Rankings from AVCA

The 2016 BYU Cougars women's volleyball team represented Brigham Young University in the 2016 NCAA Division I women's volleyball season. The Cougars are led by second year head coach Heather Olmstead and play their home games at the Smith Fieldhouse. The Cougars are members of the WCC.

BYU comes off a season where they won the WCC regular season championship and once again participated in the NCAA tournament.

== Season highlights ==
Season highlights will be filled in as the season progresses.

== Roster ==
2016 BYU Cougars Roster
Defensive Specialist/Libero: 1 Jaiden Kaka – Junior; 8 Makenna Santiago – Senior; 17 Tristyn Moser – Freshman; 18 Mary Lake – Freshman; Opposite hitters: 2 Cosy Burnett – (redshirt) Junior; 5 Emily Lewis – (redshirt) Freshman	Outside hitters: 11 Lacy Haddock – Sophomore; 12 Roni Jones-Perry – Sophomore; 13 Danelle Parady – (redshirt) Sophomore; 14 McKenna Miller – Freshman; Setters: 3 Alohi Robins-Hardy – Junior; 6 Lyndie Haddock – Sophomore; 15 Kiani Tuileta – (redshirt) Freshman	Middle blockers: 4 Madeline Graham – Junior; 7 Sophie Hartsock – Sophomore; 10 Amy Boswell – (redshirt) Senior; 16 Whitney Young Howard – (redshirt) Senior; 21 Megan Mowry – Freshman; 24 Kennedy Redding – Freshman

== Schedule ==
Date Time	Opponent	Rank	Arena City (Tournament)	Television	Result	Attendance	Record (WCC Record)
8/26; 7 p.m.	Utah Valley	#13	Smith Fieldhouse; Provo, UT (BYU Invitational)	BYUtv	W 3–0 (25-14, 25-14, 25-13)	4,672	1–0
8/27; 12:30 p.m.	Rice	#13	Smith Fieldhouse; Provo, UT (BYU Invitational)	BYUtv	W 3–2 (25-20, 23-25, 24-26, 25-18, 15-8)	384	2–0
8/27; 7:30 p.m.	Cal Poly	#13	Smith Fieldhouse; Provo, UT (BYU Invitational)	BYUtv	W 3–0 (25-16, 25-13, 25-20)	1,678	3–0
9/02; 8 a.m.	vs. Wyoming	#10	St. John Arena; Columbus, OH (Sports Imports D.C. Koehl Classic)		W 3–0 (25-20, 25-22, 25-14)	N/A	4–0
9/02; 3:30 p.m.	vs. LIU-Brooklyn	#10	St. John Arena; Columbus, OH (Sports Imports D.C. Koehl Classic)		W 3–0 (25-16, 25-8, 25-13)	N/A	5–0
9/03; 5 p.m.	@ #11 Ohio State	#10	St. John Arena; Columbus, OH (Sports Imports D.C. Koehl Classic)		W 3–2 (19-25, 24-26, 25-14, 25-20, 15-9)	1,341	6–0
9/09; 4 p.m.	vs. Boise State	#10	Holt Arena; Pocatello, ID (Idaho State Invitational)		W 3–0 (25-11, 25-23, 25-18)	97	7–0
9/10; 12 p.m.	vs. Missouri	#10	Holt Arena; Pocatello, ID (Idaho State Invitational)		W 3–0 (26-24, 26-24, 25-17)	N/A	8–0
9/10; 7 p.m.	@ Idaho State	#10	Holt Arena; Pocatello, ID (Idaho State Invitational)	Watch Big Sky	W 3–0 (25-14, 25-21, 25-14)	939	9–0
9/15; 7 p.m.	Utah	#9	Smith Fieldhouse; Provo, UT (Deseret First Duel)	BYUtv	L 3–2 (27-25, 25-20, 23-15, 17-25, 15-13)	2,688	9–1
9/16; 7 p.m.	CSUN	#9	Smith Fieldhouse; Provo, UT (UVU/BYU Invitational)	BYUtv	W 3–0 (25-19, 25-23, 25-20)	1,581	10–1
9/17; 5 p.m.	UNLV	#9	Smith Fieldhouse; Provo, UT (UVU/BYU Invitational)	TheW.tv	W 3–0 (25-19, 25-17, 25-21)	1,130	11–1
9/22; 7 p.m.	Santa Clara*	#13	Smith Fieldhouse; Provo, UT	BYUtv	W 3–0 (25-19, 29-27, 25-17)	1,433	12–1 (1–0)
9/24; 1 p.m.	San Francisco*	#13	Smith Fieldhouse; Provo, UT	TheW.tv	W 3–0 (25-15, 25-16, 25-10)	1,448	13–1 (2–0)
9/27; 8 p.m.	@ Pepperdine*	#11	Firestone Fieldhouse; Malibu, CA	TheW.tv	W 3–1 (22-25, 25-23, 25-18, 25-21)	433	14–1 (3–0)
9/30; 8 p.m.	@ #6 San Diego*	#11	Jenny Craig Pavilion; San Diego, CA	TheW.tv; Twitter	L 3–0 (25-20, 25-23, 25-23)	1,752	14–2 (3–1)
10/06; 8 p.m.	Saint Mary's*	#13	Smith Fieldhouse; Provo, UT	BYUtv	W 3–0 (25-20, 25-14, 25-10)	2,143	15–2 (4–1)
10/08; 1 p.m.	Pacific*	#13	Smith Fieldhouse; Provo, UT	TheW.tv	W 3–0 (25-22, 25-11, 25-17)	1,362	16–2 (5–1)
10/13; 8 p.m.	@ Portland*	#11	Chiles Center; Portland, OR	TheW.tv	L 3–2 (25-22, 25-27, 25-22, 17-25, 15-9)	1,113	16–3 (5–2)
10/15; 1 p.m.	@ Gonzaga*	#11	McCarthey Athletic Center; Spokane, WA	TheW.tv	W 3–0 (25-13, 25-16, 25-19)	836	17–3 (6–2)
10/20; 7 p.m.	Pepperdine*	#16	Smith Fieldhouse; Provo, UT	TheW.tv	W 3–0 (25-14, 25-12, 25-20)	1,420	18–3 (7–2)
10/22; 1 p.m.	Loyola Marymount*	#16	Smith Fieldhouse; Provo, UT	BYUtv	W 3–2 (25-23, 23-25, 21-25, 25-22, 15-12)	1,536	19–3 (8–2)
10/28; 7 p.m.	#5 San Diego*	#15	Smith Fieldhouse; Provo, UT	BYUtv	W 3–0 (26-16, 25-22, 27-25)	2,814	20–3 (9–2)
11/03; 8 p.m.	@ Pacific*	#12	Alex G. Spanos Center; Stockton, CA	TheW.tv	W 3–0 (25-15, 25-20, 25-19)	830	21–3 (10–2)
11/05; 2 p.m.	@ Saint Mary's*	#12	McKeon Pavilion; Moraga, CA	TheW.tv	W 3–0 (25-21, 25-19, 25-23)	342	22–3 (11–2)
11/10; 7 p.m.	Gonzaga *	#10	Smith Fieldhouse; Provo, UT	BYUtv	W 3–1 (25-16, 25-17, 19–25, 25-14)	2,513	23–3 (12–2)
11/12; 1 p.m.	Portland*	#10	Smith Fieldhouse; Provo, UT	TheW.tv	W 3–0 (25-10, 32-30, 25-15)	670	24–3 (13–2)
11/17; 8 p.m.	@ San Francisco*	#10	War Memorial Gymnasium; San Francisco, CA	TheW.tv	W 3–1 (25-10, 21–25, 25-13, 25-9)	114	25–3 (14–2)
11/19; 2 p.m.	@ Santa Clara*	#10	Leavey Center; Santa Clara, CA	TheW.tv	W 3–1 (25-15, 15–25, 26-24, 25-12)	400	26–3 (15–2)
11/22; 8 p.m.	@ Loyola Marymount*	#10	Gersten Pavilion; Los Angeles, CA	ESPNU	W 3–2 (16–25, 16–25, 25-20, 25-22, 15-13)	789	27–3 (16–2)
12/02; 7 p.m.	y- Princeton	#10	Smith Fieldhouse; Provo, UT	BYUtv	W 3–0 (25-22, 25-15, 25-23)	2,696	28–3
12/03; 7 p.m.	y- UNLV	#10	Smith Fieldhouse; Provo, UT	BYUtv	W 3–0 (25-23, 25-21, 25-12)	2,049	29–3
12/09; 7 p.m.	y- @ #5 Texas	#10	Gregory Gymnasium; Austin, TX	ESPNU	L 3–2 (25–23, 25–14, 24-26, 22-25, 16-14)	3,478	29–4

*-Indicates Conference Opponent
y-Indicates NCAA Playoffs
Times listed are Mountain Time Zone.

== Announcers for televised games ==
All home games will be on BYUtv or Campus Insiders TheW.tv. Select road games will also be televised or streamed.

- Utah Valley: Spencer Linton, Kristen Kozlowski, & Jason Shepherd
- Rice: Spencer Linton, Kristen Kozlowski, & Jason Shepherd
- Cal Poly: Spencer Linton, Kristen Kozlowski, & Jason Shepherd
- Idaho State: Matt Steuart & Kade Vance
- Utah: Spencer Linton, Amy Gant, & Jason Shepherd
- CSUN: Spencer Linton, Amy Gant, & Jason Shepherd
- UNLV: Mitchell Marshall
- Santa Clara: Spencer Linton, Steve Vail, & Jason Shepherd
- San Francisco: Robbie Bullough & Mitchell Marshall
- Pepperdine: Al Epstein
- San Diego: Darren Preston
- Saint Mary's: Spencer Linton, Kristen Kozlowski, & Jason Shepherd
- Pacific: Mitchell Marshall
- Portland: Cody Barton
- Gonzaga: No commentary
- Pepperdine: Robbie Bullough & Mitchell Marshall
- Loyola Marymount: Spencer Linton, Kristen Kozlowski, & Jason Shepherd
- San Diego: Spencer Linton, Kristen Kozlowski, & Jason Shepherd
- Pacific: Don Gubbins
- Saint Mary's: Alex Jensen
- Gonzaga: Spencer Linton, Kristen Kozlowski, & Jason Shepherd
- Portland: Mitchell Marshall
- San Francisco: Pat Olsen
- Santa Clara: No commentary
- Loyola Marymount: Paul Sunderland & Dain Blanton
- Princeton: Spencer Linton, Kristen Kozlowski, & Jason Shepherd
- UNLV: Spencer Linton, Kristen Kozlowski, & Jason Shepherd
- Texas: Tiffany Greene & Maria Taylor
