= 2023 BYU Cougars women's volleyball team =

2023 BYU Cougars women's volleyball
- Conference: Big 12 Conference
- Record: 13–3 (2–2 Big XII)
- Head coach: Heather Olmstead (9th season)
- Assistant coaches: David Hyte (10th season); Jonny Neeley (8th season)
- Home arena: Smith Fieldhouse

2023 Big 12 Conference volleyball standings
	Conf.				Overall
Team	W		L	PCT	W		L	PCT
No. 5 Texas ‍†‍‍^{y}	15	–	1	.938	20	–	4	.833
No. 13 BYU ‍‍‍^{y}	11	–	4	.733	22	–	5	.815
No. 17 Kansas ‍‍‍^{y}	11	–	4	.733	20	–	5	.800
No. 21 Houston ‍‍‍^{y}	10	–	5	.667	17	–	7	.708
Iowa State ‍‍‍^{y}	8	–	7	.533	17	–	9	.654
UCF ‍‍‍	8	–	7	.533	17	–	9	.654
Kansas State ‍‍‍	8	–	7	.533	14	–	10	.583
No. 23 Baylor ‍‍‍^{y}	8	–	8	.500	14	–	12	.538
TCU ‍‍‍^{y}	8	–	9	.471	15	–	13	.536
Cincinnati ‍‍‍	4	–	10	.286	11	–	13	.458
Texas Tech ‍‍‍	3	–	11	.214	10	–	16	.385
Oklahoma ‍‍‍	2	–	12	.143	9	–	15	.375
West Virginia ‍‍‍	2	–	13	.133	9	–	19	.321
† – Conference champion y – Invited to the NCAA Tournament; Rankings from AVCA; Source:Big 12 Conference

The 2023 BYU Cougars women's volleyball team represented Brigham Young University in the 2023 NCAA Division I women's volleyball season. The Cougars are led by ninth year head coach Heather Olmstead and played their home games at the Smith Fieldhouse. The Cougars were competing as members of the Big 12 Conference for the first time.

BYU comes off a season where they finished second in the WCC regular after suffering two conference losses to the San Diego Toreros, a team who eventually lost in the Final Four. The Cougars received an at-large bid to the NCAA Tournament falling to Pitt in the second round. The Cougars came in having been picked to finish second in the Big 12 behind defending national champ Texas.

== Season ==
=== Pre-season honors ===
Two Cougars were selected to the Pre-season All-Big 12 team: Super Senior setter Whitney Bower and senior outside hitter Erin Livingston. The two selections were tied for second most in the Big 12 behind only Texas (4).

== Roster ==
2023 BYU Cougars roster
Defensive Specialist/Libero: 4 Hannah Billeter - Sophomore; 14 Aria McComber - Graduate; 16 Brielle Miller - Freshman; 18 Kamaile Hiapo - Graduate; Opposite hitters: 1 Kate Prior - Sophomore; 13 Mia Lee - Freshman	Outside hitters: 8 Eden Bower- Sophomore; 9 Alyssa (Montoya) Erickson - Junior; 10 Erin Livingston - Senior; 11 Addie Benson - Freshman; 12 Claire Little - Freshman; 15 Elyse Stowell - Junior	Setters: 3 Silina Damuni - Freshman; 6 Kalia Thunstrom - Junior; 7 Whitney Bower - Senior; Middle blockers: 1 Kate Prior - Sophomore; 13 Mia Lee - Freshman; 21 Whitney McEwan-Llarenas - Graduate; 24 Brielle Kemavor - Freshman

== Schedule ==
Date Time	Opponent	Rank^{(Tournament Seed)}	Arena City (Tournament)	Television	Result	Attendance	Record (WCC Record)
08/25; 2 p.m.	vs. #5 Pitt	#17	Dahlberg Arena; Missoula, MT (Ellesyn Invitational)	ESPN+	W 3–1 (23–25, 25–20, 25–19, 25–16)	418	1—0
08/26; 7 p.m.	vs. UTRGV	#17	Dahlberg Arena; Missoula, MT (Ellesyn Invitational)	ESPN+	W 3–1 (25–22, 25–21, 18–25, 25–16)	637	2—0
08/27; 7 p.m.	@ Montana	#17	Dahlberg Arena; Missoula, MT (Ellesyn Invitational)	ESPN+	W 3–1 (25–21, 20–25, 25–16, 25–15)	795	3–0
08/30; 7 p.m.	Loyola Marymount	#9	Smith Fieldhouse; Provo, UT	ESPN+	W 3–0 (25–22, 25–16, 25–19)	3,304	4–0
08/31; 8 p.m.	McNeese	#9	Smith Fieldhouse; Provo, UT (dōTERRA Classic)	ESPN+	W 3–0 (25–14, 25–18, 25–18)	4,624	5–0
09/02; 7 p.m.	UC Davis	#9	Smith Fieldhouse; Provo, UT (dōTERRA Classic)	ESPN+	W 3–0 (25–15, 25–13, 25–11)	3,140	6–0
09/07; 11:30 a.m.	vs. Towson	#8	Bohler Gymnasium; Pullman, WA (Cougar Challenge)	P12+ WSU	W 3–1 (25–20, 25–23, 14–25, 25–22)	350	7–0
09/07; 6:30 p.m.	vs. UC Irvine	#8	Bohler Gymnasium; Pullman, WA (Cougar Challenge)	P12+ WSU	W 3–0 (25–9, 25–21, 25–23)	251	8–0
09/08; 8 p.m.	@ #13 Washington State	#8	Bohler Gymnasium; Pullman, WA (Cougar Challenge)	P12 Insider	L 1–3 (25–18, 19–25, 21–25, 19–25)	1,250	8–1
09/13; 7 p.m.	Utah	#12	Smith Fieldhouse; Provo, UT (Deseret First Duel)	ESPN+	W 3–1 (25–13, 23–25, 25–19, 25–16)	5,528	9–1
09/15; 6 p.m.	@ Utah Valley	#12	Lockhart Arena; Orem, UT (UCCU Crosstown Clash)	ESPN+	W 3–0 (25–8, 25–17, 25–14)	1,951	10–1
09/16; 7 p.m.	@ Utah State	#12	Wayne Estes Center; Logan, UT	MW Net	W 3–0 (25–20, 25–22, 25–23)	1,488	11–1
09/20; 7 p.m.	#20 Houston*	#10	Smith Fieldhouse; Provo, UT	ESPN2	W 3–0 (26–24, 25–13, 25–18)	3,714	12–1 (1–0)
9/23; 1 p.m.	#18 Baylor*	#10	Smith Fieldhouse; Provo, UT	ESPN+	W 3–0 (25–17, 25–17, 25–15)	3,459	13–1 (2–0)
9/28; 7 p.m.	@ #10 Texas*	#9	Gregory Gymnasium; Austin, TX	FS1	L 1–3 (25–13, 20–25, 15–25, 20–25)	4,844	13–2 (2–1)
9/29; 6 p.m.	@ #10 Texas*	#9	Gregory Gymnasium; Austin, TX	LHN	L 1–3 (28–26, 13–25, 22–25, 20–25)	4,667	13–3 (2–2)
10/07; 12 p.m.	@ Oklahoma*	#10	McCasland Field House; Norman, OK	ESPN+			
10/13; 7 p.m.	Texas Tech*	#9	Smith Fieldhouse; Provo, UT	ESPNU			
10/14; 7 p.m.	Texas Tech*	#9	Smith Fieldhouse; Provo, UT	ESPN+			
10/19; 7 p.m.	Iowa State*		Smith Fieldhouse; Provo, UT	ESPN+			
10/20; 7 p.m.	Iowa State*		Smith Fieldhouse; Provo, UT	ESPN+			
10/26; 5:30 p.m.	@ Kansas State*		Morgan Family Arena; Manhattan, KS	ESPN+			
10/27; 5:30 p.m.	@ Kansas State*		Morgan Family Arena; Manhattan, KS	ESPN+			
11/03; 7 p.m.	Cincinnati*		Smith Fieldhouse; Provo, UT	ESPN+			
11/04; 7 p.m.	Cincinnati*		Smith Fieldhouse; Provo, UT	ESPN+			
11/09; 5 p.m.	@ UCF*		The Venue; Orlando, FL	ESPN+			
11/10; 5 p.m.	@ UCF*		The Venue; Orlando, FL	ESPN+			
11/17; 7 p.m.	Kansas*		Smith Fieldhouse; Provo, UT	ESPN+			
11/22; 4 p.m.	@ West Virginia		WVU Coliseum; Morgantown, WV	ESPN+			
11/25; 12 p.m.	@ TCU		Schollmaier Arena; Ft. Worth, TX	ESPN+			

*-Indicates Conference Opponent
y-Indicates NCAA Playoffs
Times listed are Mountain Time Zone.

== Announcers for televised games ==
All home games and conference road games will be on ESPN+, an ESPN TV network, or a Fox Sports network. All road games will also be televised or streamed the opponents streaming service. Select neutral site matches may not have accessibility.

- Pitt: Riley Corcoran & Nate Michael
- UTRGV: Riley Corcoran & Nate Michael
- Montana: Riley Corcoran & Nate Michael
- Loyola Marymount: Jarom Jordan, Amy Gant & Kenzie Dahle
- McNeese: Jarom Jordan, Amy Gant, & Kenzie Dahle
- UC Davis: Jarom Jordan, Amy Gant, & Kenzie Dahle
- Towson: Austin Samuels
- UC Irvine: Sedona Turner
- Washington State: Steve Grubb and Evan Charney
- Utah: Jarom Jordan, Amy Gant, & Kenzie Dahle
- Utah Valley: Matthew Baiamonte & Kayli Doxey
- Utah State: Stockton Jewkes & Adam Larson
- Houston: Krista Blunk & Kevin Barnett
- Baylor: Jarom Jordan, Amy Gant, & Kenzie Dahle
- Texas: Ron Thulin & Jill Dorsey-Hall
- Texas: Tyler Denning & Shelby Coppedge
- Oklahoma: Chad McKee & Kelly Files
- Texas Tech: Paul Sunderland & Jennifer Hoffman
- Texas Tech: Jarom Jordan, Amy Gant, & Kenzie Dahle
- Iowa State: Jarom Jordan, Amy Gant, & Kenzie Dahle
- Iowa State: Jarom Jordan, Amy Gant, & Kenzie Dahle
- Kansas State: Brian Smoller, Liz Wegner-Busch, & Sophie Smith
- Kansas State: Brian Smoller, Liz Wegner-Busch, & Sophie Smith
- Cincinnati:
- Cincinnati:
- UCF:
- UCF:
- Kansas:
- West Virginia:
- TCU:
