= 2021 BYU Cougars women's volleyball team =

American college volleyball season

2021 BYU Cougars women's volleyball

2021 WCC Champions

NCAA volleyball tournament, Sweet Sixteen
- Conference: West Coast Conference
- Record: 30–2 (18–0 WCC)
- Head coach: Heather Olmstead (7th season)
- Assistant coaches: David Hyte (8th season); Jonny Neeley (6th season)
- Home arena: Smith Fieldhouse

The 2021 BYU Cougars women's volleyball team represented Brigham Young University in the 2021 NCAA Division I women's volleyball season. The Cougars were led by seventh-year head coach Heather Olmstead, and played their home games at the Smith Fieldhouse. The Cougars were members of the WCC.

BYU came off a season where they finished first and won the WCC regular season championship. The Cougars received an automatic bid to the NCAA tournament, falling to Wisconsin.

2021 West Coast Conference fall volleyball standings
	Conf.				Overall
Team	W		L	PCT	W		L	PCT
No. 4 BYU ‍†‍‍^{y}	18	–	0	1.000	30	–	2	.938
No. 25 Pepperdine ‍‍‍^{y}	14	–	4	.778	22	–	5	.815
San Diego ‍‍‍^{y}	14	–	4	.778	21	–	7	.750
Pacific ‍‍‍	10	–	8	.556	13	–	16	.448
Saint Mary's ‍‍‍	9	–	9	.500	15	–	12	.556
Santa Clara ‍‍‍	8	–	9	.471	12	–	15	.444
Loyola Marymount ‍‍‍	8	–	10	.444	17	–	11	.607
Gonzaga ‍‍‍	5	–	13	.278	9	–	20	.310
Portland ‍‍‍	2	–	14	.125	5	–	20	.200
San Francisco ‍‍‍	0	–	17	.000	0	–	25	.000
† – Conference champion y – Invited to the NCAA Tournament; Portland games at San Francisco and Santa Clara were cancelled due to COVID-19 protocols. Since neither game had an impact on determining the conference champion, neither game was rescheduled. Rankings from AVCA; Source:West Coast Conference

== Roster ==
2020–21 BYU Cougars roster
Defensive Specialist/libero: 3 Morgan Bower - Junior; 14 Aria McComber - Graduate; 18 Madi Allen - Sophomore; 25 Gretchen Reinert - Graduate; Opposite hitters: 4 Kenzie Koerber - Graduate; 12 Kate Grimmer - Junior	Outside hitters: 1 Taylen Ballard-Nixon - Senior; 9 Alyssa Montoya - Freshman; 10 Erin Livingston - Sophomore; 11 Abbey Dayton - Junior; 15 Elyse Stowell - Freshman; 22 Sophia Callahan - Freshman	Setters: 6 Zayna Meyer - Freshman; 7 Whitney Bower - Junior; 8 Tayler Tausinga - Senior; Middle blockers: 2 Heather Gneiting - Junior; 5 Bri Albright - Freshman; 21 Whitney Llarenas - (redshirt) Senior; 24 Kennedy Eschenberg - Graduate

== Schedule ==
Date Time	Opponent	Rank^{(tournament seed)}	Arena city (tournament)	Television	Result	Attendance	Record (WCC record)
08/27; 12 p.m.	Southern Utah	#15	Smith Fieldhouse; Provo, UT (dōTERRA Classic)	BYUtv	W 3–0 (25–11, 25–16, 25–13)	457	1–0
08/27; 7 p.m.	LIU	#15	Smith Fieldhouse; Provo, UT (dōTERRA Classic)	BYUtv	W 3–0 (25–11, 25–10, 25–9)	4,823	2–0
08/28; 7 p.m.	UNLV	#15	Smith Fieldhouse; Provo, UT (dōTERRA Classic)	BYUtv	W 3–0 (25–14, 25–16, 25–15)	4,453	3–0
09/02; 7 p.m.	Weber State	#13	Smith Fieldhouse; Provo, UT (BYU Invitational)	BYUtv	W 3–2 (25–23, 23–25, 18–25, 25–19, 15–4)	2,852	4–0
09/03; 7 p.m.	Dixie State (Note: known as Utah Tech University as of Summer 2022)	#13	Smith Fieldhouse; Provo, UT (BYU Invitational)	BYUtv	W 3–0 (25–8, 25–16, 25–20)	2,855	5–0
09/04; 7 p.m.	Michigan State	#13	Smith Fieldhouse; Provo, UT (BYU Invitational)	BYUtv	W 3–0 (25–14, 25–21, 25–19)	2,486	6–0
09/10; 10 a.m.	vs. Bowling Green	#12	Fitzgerald Field House; Pittsburgh, PA (Panther Challenge)		W 3–0 (25–13, 25–16, 25–19)	100	7–0
09/10; 5 p.m.	@ #4 Pitt	#12	Fitzgerald Field House; Pittsburgh, PA (Panther Challenge)	ACCN Extra	L 1–3 (21–25, 25–21, 20–25, 24–26)	1,258	7–1
09/11; 2 p.m.	vs. High Point	#12	Fitzgerald Field House; Pittsburgh, PA (Panther Challenge)		W 3–0 (25–17, 25–19, 25–19)	100	8–1
09/16; 7 p.m.	#10 Utah	#15	Smith Fieldhouse; Provo, UT (Deseret First Duel)	BYUtv	W 3–0 (25–23, 25–23, 25–16)	5,140	9–1
09/18; 6 p.m.	@ Utah Valley	#15	Lockhart Arena; Orem, UT (UCCU Crosstown Clash)	ESPN+	W 3–0 (25–16, 25–18, 25–20)	1,564	10–1
09/23; 7 p.m.	Pacific*	#11	Smith Fieldhouse; Provo, UT	BYUtv.org	W 3–0 (25–13, 25–12, 25–17)	2,490	11–1 (1–0)
09/25; 1 p.m.	Saint Mary's*	#11	Smith Fieldhouse; Provo, UT	BYUtv	W 3–0 (25–18, 25–17, 25–18)	2,351	12–1 (2–0)
09/30; 1 p.m.	@ Santa Clara*	#10	Leavey Center; Santa Clara, CA	WCC Network	W 3–0 (25–17, 25–17, 25–9)	322	13–1 (3–0)
10/02; 1 p.m.	@ San Francisco*	#10	The Sobrato Center; San Francisco, CA	WCC Network	W 3–0 (25–23, 25–16, 25–18)	193	14–1 (4–0)
10/07; 7 p.m.	Portland*	#9	Smith Fieldhouse; Provo, UT	BYUtv.org	W 3–0 (25–16, 25–15, 25–10)	2,624	15–1 (5–0)
10/09; 12 p.m.	Gonzaga*	#9	Smith Fieldhouse; Provo, UT	BYUtv.org	W 3–0 (25–7, 25–20, 25–14)	2,187	16–1 (6–0)
10/14; 8 p.m.	@ Loyola Marymount*	#8	Gersten Pavilion; Los Angeles, CA	WCC Network	W 3–1 (22–25, 25–16, 25–22, 25–19)	300	17–1 (7–0)
10/16; 1 p.m.	@ #24 Pepperdine*	#8	Firestone Fieldhouse; Malibu, CA	WCC Network	W 3–1 (21–25, 25–19, 25–10, 25–16)	737	18–1 (8–0)
10/22; 7 p.m.	#21 San Diego*	#8	Smith Fieldhouse; Provo, UT	BYUtv	W 3–0 (25–17, 25–13, 25–13)	2,828	19–1 (9–0)
10/28; 7 p.m.	San Francisco*	#7	Smith Fieldhouse; Provo, UT	BYUtv	W 3–0 (25–19, 25–15, 25–14)	2,466	20–1 (10–0)
10/30; 1 p.m.	Santa Clara*	#7	Smith Fieldhouse; Provo, UT	BYUtv	W 3–0 (25–14, 25–10, 25–17)	2,413	21–1 (11–0)
11/04; 7 p.m.	@ Gonzaga*	#6	Charlotte Y. Martin Centre; Spokane, WA	WCC Network	W 3–0 (25–9, 25–19, 25–21)	755	22–1 (12–0)
11/06; 1 p.m.	@ Portland*	#6	Chiles Center; Portland, OR	WCC Network	W 3–0 (25–21, 25–17, 25–12)	414	23–1 (13–0)
11/11; 7 p.m.	Pepperdine*	#5	Smith Fieldhouse; Provo, UT	BYUtv	W 3–0 (25–15, 25–17, 25–18)	2,973	24–1 (14–0)
11/13; 1 p.m.	Loyola Marymount*	#5	Smith Fieldhouse; Provo, UT	BYUtv	W 3–1 (25–20, 24–26, 25–21, 25–22)	3,592	25–1 (15–0)
11/18; 8 p.m.	@ Pacific*	#4	Alex G. Spanos Center; Stockton, CA	WCC Network	W 3–0 (25–20, 25–17, 29–27)	468	26–1 (16–0)
11/20; 2 p.m.	@ Saint Mary's*	#4	University Credit Union Pavilion; Moraga, CA	WCC Network	W 3–1 (25–17, 25–15, 19–25, 25–14)	313	27–1 (17–0)
11/23; 8 p.m.	@ San Diego*	#4	Jenny Craig Pavilion; San Diego, CA	WCC Network	W 3–1 (25–10, 14–25, 25–21, 25–22)	1,213	28–1 (18–0)
12/3; 7 p.m.	y- Boise State	#4 (11-seed)	Smith Fieldhouse; Provo, UT (NCAA Tournament 1st Round)	ESPN+	W 3–0 (25–6, 25–19, 25–10)	5,340	29–1
12/4; 7 p.m.	y- Utah	#4 (11-seed)	Smith Fieldhouse; Provo, UT (NCAA Tournament 2nd Round)	ESPN+	W 3–1 (17–25, 25–22, 25–23, 25–23)	4,729	30–1
12/9; 11 a.m.	y- #8 (6-seed) Purdue	#4 (11-seed)	Fitzgerald Fieldhouse; Pittsburgh, PA (NCAA Tournament Regional semifinal)	ESPNU	L 2–3 (12–25, 25–16, 25–21, 13–25, 16–18)	1,479	30–2

* - Indicates conference opponent
y - Indicates NCAA playoffs
Times listed are Mountain Time Zone.

== Announcers for televised games ==
All home games were on BYUtv or the BYUtv App. Most road games were also televised or streamed on WCC Network, with the game at Pitt on ACC Network Extra, Utah Valley on ESPN+, and the other two Panther Classic matches being untelevised.

- Southern Utah: Jarom Jordan, Amy Gant, & Kiki Solano
- LIU: Jarom Jordan & Amy Gant
- UNLV: Jarom Jordan, Amy Gant, & Kiki Solano
- Weber State: Jarom Jordan, Amy Gant, & Kiki Solano
- Dixie State: Jason Shepherd & Amy Gant
- Michigan State: Brandon Crow & Amy Gant
- Pitt: Josh Rowntree & Amanda Silay
- Utah: Jarom Jordan, Amy Gant, & Kiki Solano
- Utah Valley: Matt Baiamonte & Madison Dennison
- Pacific: Jarom Jordan & Amy Gant
- Saint Mary's: Jarom Jordan, Amy Gant, & Kiki Solano
- Santa Clara: Anthony Passarelli
- San Francisco: Joaquin Wallace
- Portland: Spencer Linton Amy Gant, & Kiki Solano
- Gonzaga: Jarom Jordan, Amy Gant, & Kiki Solano
- Loyola Marymount: Jonathan Grace & Joely Karrer
- Pepperdine: Al Epstein
- San Diego: Jarom Jordan, Amy Gant, & Kiki Solano
- San Francisco: Jarom Jordan, Amy Gant, & Kiki Solano
- Santa Clara: Jarom Jordan, Amy Gant, & Kiki Solano
- Gonzaga: Thomas Gallagher & Bella Fontaine
- Portland: Bryan Sleik & Carly Dumanon
- Pepperdine: Jarom Jordan, Amy Gant, & Kiki Solano
- Loyola Marymount: Jarom Jordan, Amy Gant, & Kiki Solano
- Pacific: Paul Muyskens & Carmelo DeLa Fuente
- Saint Mary's: Ben Ross
- San Diego: Jack Cronin
- Boise State: Jarom Jordan & Amy Gant
- Utah: Jarom Jordan & Amy Gant
- Purdue: Alex Loeb & Missy Whittemore
