= 2019 BYU Cougars women's volleyball team =

American college volleyball season

2019 BYU Cougars women's volleyball

NCAA, Second Round
- Conference: West Coast Conference
- Record: 26–5 (16–2 WCC)
- Head coach: Heather Olmstead (5th season)
- Assistant coaches: David Hyte (6th season); Jonny Neeley (4th season)
- Home arena: Smith Fieldhouse

The 2019 BYU Cougars women's volleyball team represented Brigham Young University in the 2019 NCAA Division I women's volleyball season. The Cougars were led by fifth year head coach Heather Olmstead and played their home games at the Smith Fieldhouse. The Cougars were members of the WCC.

BYU came off a season where they won the WCC regular season championship and once again participated in the NCAA Tournament before falling to Stanford in the national semifinal.

The Cougars would put together another impressive season with a 25-4 record. However two losses in conference play caused the Cougars to finish second in the WCC. The Cougars were granted an at-large bid to the NCAA Tournament and were given the #14 seed, allowing them to host the first two rounds. BYU would be swept by Utah in the 2nd Round to finish the season at 26-5. After the tournament was completed BYU finished ranked #17 in the nation.

2019 West Coast Conference volleyball standings
| | Conf. | | | | Overall |
| Team | W | | L | PCT | W | | L | PCT |
|---|---|---|---|---|---|---|---|---|
| No. 21 San Diego ‍†‍‍^{y} | 17 | – | 1 | .944 | 25 | – | 5 | .833 |
| No. 17 BYU ‍‍‍^{y} | 16 | – | 2 | .889 | 26 | – | 5 | .839 |
| Pepperdine ‍‍‍ | 14 | – | 4 | .778 | 18 | – | 11 | .621 |
| Santa Clara ‍‍‍ | 10 | – | 8 | .556 | 21 | – | 12 | .636 |
| Loyola Marymount ‍‍‍ | 9 | – | 9 | .500 | 15 | – | 15 | .500 |
| Saint Mary's ‍‍‍ | 7 | – | 11 | .389 | 11 | – | 17 | .393 |
| Pacific ‍‍‍ | 5 | – | 13 | .278 | 13 | – | 17 | .433 |
| Gonzaga ‍‍‍ | 5 | – | 13 | .278 | 11 | – | 19 | .367 |
| San Francisco ‍‍‍ | 4 | – | 14 | .222 | 8 | – | 21 | .276 |
| Portland ‍‍‍ | 3 | – | 15 | .167 | 11 | – | 18 | .379 |
† – Conference champion y – Invited to the NCAA Tournament; As of 2019-11-23; Rankings from AVCA; Source:West Coast Conference

== Season highlights ==
Will be filled in as the season progresses.

== Roster ==
2019 BYU Cougars roster
| Defensive Specialist/Libero: 3 Morgan Bower - Freshman; 6 Callie Whitney - Freshman; 17 Grace Wee - Freshman; 18 Mary Lake - Senior; Opposite hitters: 12 Kate Grimmer - Freshman | Outside hitters: 1 Taylen Ballard-Nixon - Junior; 9 Madelyn Robinson - Sophomore; 10 Erin Anderson - Freshman; 11 Abbey Dayton - Freshman; 13 Morgan Johnson - Freshman; 14 McKenna Miller - Senior; 20 Riley Lyman - Senior | Setters: 7 Whitney Bower - Freshman; 8 Tayler Tausinga - Sophomore; 15 Kiani Moea'i - (redshirt) Senior; Middle blockers: 2 Heather Gneiting- Sophomore; 21 Whitney Llarenas - (redshirt) Freshman; 24 Kennedy Eschenberg - (redshirt) Junior |

== Schedule ==
| Date Time | Opponent | Rank | Arena City (Tournament) | Television | Result | Attendance | Record (WCC Record) |
|---|---|---|---|---|---|---|---|
| 8/30; 12 p.m. | Boise State | #9 | Smith Fieldhouse; Provo, UT (BYU Nike Invitational) | BYUtv | W 3–0 (25–13, 25–21, 25–17) | 750 | 1–0 |
| 8/30; 7:30 p.m. | Utah Valley | #9 | Smith Fieldhouse; Provo, UT (UCCU Crosstown Clash)/(BYU Nike Invitational) | BYUtv | W 3–0 (25–21, 25–21, 25–20) | 2,887 | 2–0 |
| 8/31; 7 p.m. | #16 Marquette | #9 | Smith Fieldhouse; Provo, UT (BYU Nike Invitational) | BYUtv | L 1–3 (25–22, 16–25, 22–25, 12–25) | 4,075 | 2–1 |
| 9/05; 7 p.m. | LIU | #13 | Smith Fieldhouse; Provo, UT (BYU Doterra Classic) | WCC Network | W 3–0 (25–14, 25–17, 25–10) | 2,115 | 3–1 |
| 9/06; 7 p.m. | Sam Houston State | #13 | Smith Fieldhouse; Provo, UT (BYU Doterra Classic) | WCC Network | W 3–1 (24–26, 25–13, 25–16, 25–18) | 1,882 | 4–1 |
| 9/07; 7 p.m. | Weber State | #13 | Smith Fieldhouse; Provo, UT (BYU Doterra Classic) | WCC Network | W 3–0 (25–22, 25–16, 25–22) | 2,247 | 5–1 |
| 9/12; 6 p.m. | @ Wichita State | #13 | Charles Koch Arena; Wichita, KS (Shocker Volleyball Classic) | YurView | W 3–1 (23–25, 25–16, 25–19, 25–20) | 2,608 | 6–1 |
| 9/13; 3:30 p.m. | vs. #3 Texas | #13 | Charles Koch Arena; Wichita, KS (Shocker Volleyball Classic) | FloVolleyball | L 1–3 (25–23, 22–25, 19–25, 18–25) | 2,435 | 6–2 |
| 9/14; 11 a.m. | vs. VCU | #13 | Charles Koch Arena; Wichita, KS (Shocker Volleyball Classic) | FloVolleyball | W 3–1 (25–8, 22–25, 25–22, 25–21) | 1,247 | 7–2 |
| 9/19; 6 p.m. | @ #18 Utah | #12 | Huntsman Center; Salt Lake City, UT (Deseret First Duel) | P12 | W 3–1 (25–22, 25–21, 12–25, 25–18) | 4,110 | 8–2 |
| 9/21; 1 p.m. | @ #2 Stanford | #12 | Maples Pavilion; Stanford, CA | P12 | W 3–1 (18–25, 25–22, 25–23, 31–29) | 2,964 | 9–2 |
| 9/26; 7 p.m. | @ Gonzaga* | #9 | Charlotte Y. Martin Centre; Spokane, WA | WCC Network | W 3–0 (25–13, 25–13, 25–17) | 1,657 | 10–2 (1–0) |
| 9/28; 1 p.m. | @ Portland* | #9 | Chiles Center; Portland, OR | WCC Network | W 3–0 (25–20, 25–22, 25–18) | 742 | 11–2 (2–0) |
| 10/01; 7 p.m. | Loyola Marymount* | #9 | Smith Fieldhouse; Provo, UT | WCC Network | W 3–2 (25–22, 25–20, 21–25, 22–25, 15–7) | 2,822 | 12–2 (3–0) |
| 10/03; 8 p.m. | @ Pacific* | #9 | Alex G. Spanos Center; Stockton, CA | WCC Network | W 3–0 (25–19, 25–17, 26–24) | 769 | 13–2 (4–0) |
| 10/05; 2 p.m. | @ Saint Mary's* | #9 | McKeon Pavilion; Moraga, CA | WCC Network | W 3–0 (25–12, 25–22, 29–27) | 408 | 14–2 (5–0) |
| 10/10; 7 p.m. | San Francisco* | #9 | Smith Fieldhouse; Provo, UT | byutv.org | W 3–0 (25–11, 25–14, 25–23) | 2,499 | 15–2 (6–0) |
| 10/12; 1 p.m. | Santa Clara* | #9 | Smith Fieldhouse; Provo, UT | WCC Network | W 3–0 (25–16, 25–11, 25–10) | 2,604 | 16–2 (7–0) |
| 10/18; 7 p.m. | San Diego* | #9 | Smith Fieldhouse; Provo, UT | BYUtv | L 2–3 (18–25, 25–20, 19–25, 25–17, 10–15) | 4,405 | 16–3 (7–1) |
| 10/24; 8 p.m. | @ Loyola Marymount | #12 | Gersten Pavilion; Los Angeles, CA | WCC Network | W 3–1 (25-22, 25-12, 15-25, 25-22) | 583 | 17–3 (8–1) |
| 10/26; 2 p.m. | @ Pepperdine* | #12 | Firestone Fieldhouse; Malibu, CA | WCC Network | W 3–0 (25-21, 25-15, 29-27) | 873 | 18–3 (9–1) |
| 10/31; 7 p.m. | Saint Mary's | #11 | Smith Fieldhouse; Provo, UT | byutv.org | W 3–0 (25-15, 25-11, 25-13) | 2,331 | 19–3 (10–1) |
| 11/02; 1 p.m. | Pacific* | #11 | Smith Fieldhouse; Provo, UT | BYUtv | W 3–1 (22–25, 25-11, 25-12, 25-20) | 2,685 | 20–3 (11–1) |
| 11/07; 8 p.m. | @ Santa Clara* | #11 | Leavey Center; Santa Clara, CA | WCC Network | W 3–1 (25-22, 20–25, 25-23, 25-18) | 355 | 21–3 (12–1) |
| 11/09; 8 p.m. | @ San Francisco* | #11 | War Memorial Gymnasium; San Francisco, CA | WCC Network | W 3–0 (25-17, 25-14, 25-23) | 230 | 22–3 (13–1) |
| 11/15; 8 p.m. | @ #24 San Diego* | #10 | Jenny Craig Pavilion; San Diego, CA | WCC Network | L 2–3 (25–18, 23–25, 26–24, 16–25, 9–15) | 2,048 | 22–4 (13–2) |
| 11/21; 7 p.m. | Portland* | #13 | Smith Fieldhouse; Provo, UT | WCC Network | W 3–0 (25-15, 25-14, 25-17) | 2,412 | 23–4 (14–2) |
| 11/23; 1 p.m. | Gonzaga* | #13 | Smith Fieldhouse; Provo, UT | BYUtv | W 3–1 (21-25, 25-9, 25–20, 25–16) | 3,203 | 24–4 (15–2) |
| 11/26; 8 p.m. | Pepperdine* | #13 | Smith Fieldhouse; Provo, UT | ESPNU | W 3–2 (25-15, 25-19, 20–25, 20–25, 15–3) | 3,646 | 25–4 (16–2) |
| 12/06; 7 p.m. | y- New Mexico State | #13 (14-seed) | Smith Fieldhouse; Provo, UT (NCAA Tournament 1st Round) | BYUtv | W 3–0 (25–7, 25–23, 25–19) | 2,401 | 26–4 (16–2) |
| 12/07; 7 p.m. | y- #17 Utah | #13 (14-seed) | Smith Fieldhouse; Provo, UT (NCAA Tournament 2nd Round) | BYUtv | L 0–3 (15–25, 15–25, 15–25) | 3,250 | 26–5 (16–2) |

*-Indicates Conference Opponent
y-Indicates NCAA Playoffs
Times listed are Mountain Time Zone.

== Announcers for televised games ==
All home games will be on BYUtv or WCC Network (formerly TheW.tv). Most road game will also be televised or streamed.

- Boise State: Spencer Linton, Amy Gant, & Jason Shepherd
- Utah Valley: Spencer Linton, Amy Gant, & Jason Shepherd
- Marquette: Spencer Linton, Amy Gant, & Jason Shepherd
- LIU: Royce Hinton
- Sam Houston State: Royce Hinton
- Weber State: Royce Hinton
- Wichita State: Shane Dennis
- Texas: Shane Dennis
- VCU: Shane Dennis
- Utah: Krista Blunk & Amy Gant
- Stanford: Kate Scott & Rich Feller
- Gonzaga: Connor Basch, Faith Smith, &
- Portland: Bryan Sleik
- Loyola Marymount: Royce Hinton
- Pacific: Paul Muyskens
- Saint Mary's: Alex Jensen & Andy Schroeder
- San Francisco: Jarom Jordan, Amy Gant, & Jason Shepherd
- Santa Clara: Royce Hinton
- San Diego: Spencer Linton, Amy Gant, & Jason Shepherd
- Loyola Marymount: Betsi Flint & Sean/Shawn/Shaun Mare
- Pepperdine: Al Epstein
- Saint Mary's: Spencer Linton & Amy Gant
- Pacific: Jarom Jordan & Amy Gant
- Santa Clara: Anthony Passarelli
- San Francisco: Pat Olson
- San Diego: Jack Cronin
- Portland: Royce Hinton
- Gonzaga: Jarom Jordan & Amy Gant
- Pepperdine: Paul Sunderland & Karch Kiraly
- New Mexico State: Spencer Linton & Amy Gant
- Utah: Spencer Linton & Amy Gant
