= Heather Olmstead =

American volleyball coach

Current position
- Title: Associate head coach
- Team: Hawaii
- Conference: MW

Biographical details
- Born: Carpinteria, California, US
- Education: Utah State University

Playing career
- 1998–2001: Utah State Aggies
- Position: Libero

Coaching career (HC unless noted)
- 2003–2005: Utah State (assistant)
- 2006–2010: Utah (assistant)
- 2011–2014: BYU (assistant)
- 2015–2025: BYU
- 2026–present: Hawaii (associate HC)

Head coaching record
- Overall: 279–55 (.835)
- Tournaments: 16–11 (.593)

Accomplishments and honors

Championships
- 6× WCC regular season (2015, 2016, 2017, 2018, 2020, 2021)

Awards
- AVCA National Coach of the Year (2018); 3× AVCA Pacific South Region Coach of the Year (2018, 2020, 2021); 4× West Coast Conference Coach of the Year (2015, 2018, 2020, 2021)

Heather Olmstead is an American volleyball coach who is currently the associate head coach for the Hawaii Rainbow Wahine volleyball program. From 2015 to 2025, she served as head coach for the BYU Cougars women's volleyball team. In 2018, she was named the American Volleyball Coaches Association Coach of the Year. She also served as head coach of the U.S. Collegiate National Team in Japan and as the assistant coach at the 2015 Pan American Games.

== Career ==
=== High school ===
Olmstead attended Carpinteria High School for four years. She was a starter on the school's volleyball team her entire high school career and earned team MVP in 1997.

=== Utah State ===
After graduating from Carpinteria High School, Olmstead was a four-year starter on the Utah State Aggies women's volleyball team from 1999 until 2001 while majoring in family and consumer science. In her sophomore year, she averaged 2.08 digs per game. In both her junior and senior years, she helped the team qualify for the NCAA tournament and rank top-25 within their national collegiate league. She also became the first defensive specialist in Big West Conference history to be named first-team all-league. As a result, she finished her collegiate career with the second-highest dig total in school history and set a new single-season record for most digs with 340. Her record was broken in 2003 by Taubi Neves who recorded 344 digs.

She graduated from Utah State in 2002 and joined the coaching staff in 2003 as an assistant coach. However, she was eligible for the 2003 United States Professional Volleyball (USPV) Draft after she received an invite to the USPV National Athlete Tryout Camp. Olmstead was also the only Libero draft-eligible out of 109 athletes.

=== BYU ===
In 2011, her brother convinced her to coach at Brigham Young University (BYU). She worked under him as an assistant coach to the BYU Cougars women's volleyball team until her promotion to head coach in 2015. In her first year as head coach, Olmstead led the team to a 28–3 record and won the 2015 Marcia E. Hamilton Classic title. As a result, she was the recipient of the 2015 West Coast Conference Coach of the Year honors. Olmstead was later approached by USA Volleyball (USAV) to have her serve as an assistant coach at the 2015 Pan American Games under the direction of Dan Fisher.

The following year, Olmstead was named the American Volleyball Coaches Association South Region Coach of the Year after she led the team to the NCAA tournament. In May 2016, she was asked to serve as an assistant coach for Team USA at the 2016 XV Pan-American Cup. Her winning streak continued as the 2017 Cougars women's volleyball team held a 30–3 record and won the conference title.

During the 2018 season, Olmstead earned her 100th win in a match against Pepperdine University. At the conclusion of the season, she was named the American Volleyball Coaches Association Coach of the Year. The following year, USAV chose her to coach the U.S. Collegiate National Volleyball Team in Japan. At the time of her selection, Olmstead held the highest winning percentage of any women's volleyball coach in NCAA Division I history with a minimum of one season and in any division with a minimum of three seasons.

=== Hawaii ===
Olmstead was named the associate head coach at Hawaii on July 27, 2026.

== Head coaching record ==
Record table
| Season | Team | Overall | Conference | Standing | Postseason |
|---|---|---|---|---|---|
BYU (West Coast Conference) (2015–2022)
| 2015 | BYU | 28–4 | 16–2 | 1st | NCAA Sweet Sixteen |
| 2016 | BYU | 29–4 | 16–2 | 1st | NCAA Sweet Sixteen |
| 2017 | BYU | 30–3 | 17–1 | 1st | NCAA Sweet Sixteen |
| 2018 | BYU | 31–2 | 17–1 | 1st | NCAA Final Four |
| 2019 | BYU | 26–5 | 16–2 | 2nd | NCAA Second Round |
| 2020 | BYU | 17–2 | 15–1 | 1st | NCAA Sweet 16 |
| 2021 | BYU | 30–2 | 18–0 | 1st | NCAA Sweet 16 |
| 2022 | BYU | 22–7 | 14–3 | 2nd | NCAA Second Round |
BYU (Big 12 Conference) (2023–present)
| 2023 | BYU | 25–7 | 13–5 | 2nd | NCAA Second Round |
| 2024 | BYU | 19–10 | 12–6 | 6th | NCAA First Round |
| 2025 | BYU | 22–9 | 10–8 | 6th | NCAA First Round |
| BYU: | | 279–55 (.835) | 164–31 (.841) | | |
| Total: | | 279–55 (.835) | | | |
National champion Postseason invitational champion Conference regular season champion Conference regular season and conference tournament champion Division regular season champion Division regular season and conference tournament champion Conference tournament champion

== Personal life ==
Olmstead is one of seven children born to parents Rick and Trudy Olmstead. She has a twin sister, and her brother, Shawn Olmstead, coaches the BYU Cougars men's volleyball team. Olmstead is a member of the Church of Jesus Christ of Latter-day Saints.
