= BYU Cougars women's volleyball =

American college volleyball team

- Founded: 1969
- University: Brigham Young University
- Athletic director: Brian Santiago
- Head coach: Rob Neilson (1st season)
- Conference: Big 12
- Location: Provo, Utah, US
- Home arena: George Albert Smith Fieldhouse (capacity: 5,000)
- Nickname: Cougars
- Colors: Blue and white

AIAW/NCAA tournament runner-up
- 1972, 2014

AIAW/NCAA tournament semifinal
- 1972, 1977, 1993, 2014, 2018

AIAW/NCAA Regional Final
- 1972, 1977, 1985, 1986, 1987, 1992, 1993, 1996, 1997, 1998, 2007, 2014, 2018

AIAW/NCAA regional semifinal
- 1972, 1977, 1981, 1982, 1983, 1985, 1986, 1987, 1988, 1992, 1993, 1996, 1997, 1998, 1999, 2000, 2007, 2012, 2013, 2014, 2015, 2016, 2017, 2018, 2020, 2021

AIAW/NCAA tournament appearance
- 1969, 1970, 1972, 1973, 1974, 1975, 1976, 1977, 1978, 1979, 1981, 1982, 1983, 1984, 1985, 1986, 1987, 1988, 1990, 1991, 1992, 1993, 1994, 1995, 1996, 1997, 1998, 1999, 2000, 2001, 2003, 2005, 2006, 2007, 2012, 2013, 2014, 2015, 2016, 2017, 2018, 2019, 2020, 2021, 2022, 2023, 2024, 2025, 2026

Conference tournament champion
- Western Athletic Conference; 1996, 1997; Mountain West Conference; 2000

Conference regular season champion
- Intermountain Conference of College Women Physical Education; 1969, 1970, 1971 Intermountain Athletic Conference; 1972, 1973, 1974, 1975, 1976, 1977, 1981 High Country Athletic Conference; 1982, 1983, 1986, 1987 Western Athletic Conference; 1990, 1992, 1993, 1994, 1996, 1997, 1998 Mountain West Conference; 1999, 2000, 2005 West Coast Conference; 2012, 2014, 2015, 2016, 2017, 2018, 2020, 2021 Big 12 Conference; 2026

The BYU Cougars women's volleyball team is the women's college volleyball program representing Brigham Young University (BYU) in Provo, Utah. The Cougars began female collegiate volleyball competition in 1969 and have won 33 conference championships and have been national runners up twice (1972 and 2014).

== History ==
BYU's women's volleyball team first took the court in 1956, but official records began to be kept in 1969, with the team playfully known as the "Spikettes." From 1961 to 2001, the team was coached by Elaine Michaelis, during which time she simultaneously coached women's basketball, field hockey, and softball at one point. She was the first female coach in the nation to take a team to the NCAA Final Four (1981), and she led the team to 28 consecutive 20-win seasons. The court at the Smith Fieldhouse was named in her honor in 2005. In 1993, the team became the first BYU team to qualify for the NCAA Final Four. In 2014, it finished as the NCAA tournament runner-up, and in 2018 the program attained its highest season win percentage of .939.

As of 2024, the Cougars have been ranked in the AVCA Division I WVB Coaches Poll 490 times (.761) since it was started in 1984, including 198 Top 10 rankings and 15 rankings at #1. The team has finished their season ranked 33 times, including 15 times in the Top 10 and 5 times in the Top 5. The Cougars also finished ranked #1 for the 1986 season despite being eliminated during the Elite Eight round of that year's NCAA tournament.

== Venue ==
The Cougars play at the Smith Fieldhouse, which is the seventh largest venue for college volleyball in the United States. The team's largest home game attendance on record was 5,528 in 2023 against rival Utah.

== Coaches ==
Name	Career	Record	Pct.
Elaine Michaelis	1969–2001	705–178–5	.798
Karen Lamb	2002–2004	57–39	.594
Jason Watson	2005–2007	74–18	.804
Shay Goulding	2008–2010	43–42	.506
Shawn Olmstead	2011–2014	103–25	.805
Heather Olmstead	2015–2025	279–55	.835
Rob Neilson	2026–	0–0	–

Two coaches have been named the AVCA National Coach of the Year: Shawn Olmstead (2014) and Heather Olmstead (2018).

== Players ==
BYU has had 40 All-Americans in women's volleyball, which ranks 10th all-time among Division I programs. Mariliisa Salmi was the AVCA National Player of the Year for 1986.

After college, many players have gone on to play on national and professional club teams, including Charlene Johnson-Tagaloa who was setter for the United States national team at the 2000 Summer Olympics that placed fourth.

== Results by season ==
Record table
Season	Coach	Overall	Conference	Standing	Postseason
Elaine Michaelis (Intermountain Conference of College Women Physical Education) (1969–1971)
1969	Elaine Michaelis	19–3	14–0	1st	DGWS First Round
1970	Elaine Michaelis	22–2	8–0	1st	DGWS First Round
1971	Elaine Michaelis	11–2	8–0	1st	DGWS First Round
Elaine Michaelis (Intermountain Athletic Conference) (1972–1981)
1972	Elaine Michaelis	20–2	8–0	1st	AIAW Runner-up
1973	Elaine Michaelis	18–3	8–0	1st	AIAW First Round
1974	Elaine Michaelis	22–4	11–1	1st	AIAW First Round
1975	Elaine Michaelis	29–3–1	13–0	1st	AIAW First Round
1976	Elaine Michaelis	31–4–1	12–0	1st	AIAW First Round
1977	Elaine Michaelis	34–5	12–0	1st	AIAW Final Four
1978	Elaine Michaelis	29–16	9–3	3rd	AIAW First Round
1979	Elaine Michaelis	21–17–3	8–2	2nd	AIAW First Round
1980	Elaine Michaelis	29–13	8–2	2nd	—
1981	Elaine Michaelis	32–10	10–0	1st	NCAA Sweet Sixteen
Elaine Michaelis (High Country Athletic Conference) (1982–1989)
1982	Elaine Michaelis	33–9	10–0	1st	NCAA Sweet Sixteen
1983	Elaine Michaelis	29–7	9–1	1st	NCAA Sweet Sixteen
1984	Elaine Michaelis	33–14	9–3	2nd	NCAA First Round
1985	Elaine Michaelis	34–10	10–2	2nd	NCAA Elite Eight
1986	Elaine Michaelis	40–3	12–0	1st	NCAA Elite Eight
1987	Elaine Michaelis	34–5	11–1	1st	NCAA Elite Eight
1988	Elaine Michaelis	26–11	9–3	2nd	NCAA Sweet Sixteen
1989	Elaine Michaelis	24–11	10–2	2nd	—
Elaine Michaelis (Western Athletic Conference) (1990–1998)
1990	Elaine Michaelis	26–8	9–1	1st	NCAA First Round
1991	Elaine Michaelis	26–5	10–2	2nd	NCAA First Round
1992	Elaine Michaelis	29–4	14–0	1st	NCAA Elite Eight
1993	Elaine Michaelis	29–3	14–0	1st	NCAA Final Four
1994	Elaine Michaelis	25–4	13–1	1st	NCAA Second Round
1995	Elaine Michaelis	21–9	11–3	2nd	NCAA Second Round
1996	Elaine Michaelis	27–7	15–1	1st	NCAA Elite Eight
1997	Elaine Michaelis	29–6	13–1	1st	NCAA Elite Eight
1998	Elaine Michaelis	31–4	13–1	1st	NCAA Elite Eight
Elaine Michaelis (Mountain West Conference) (1999–2001)
1999	Elaine Michaelis	28–5	13–1	1st	NCAA Sweet Sixteen
2000	Elaine Michaelis	26–7	13–6	1st	NCAA Sweet Sixteen
2001	Elaine Michaelis	20–9	10–4	3rd	NCAA First Round
Elaine Michaelis:		705–178–5	269–24		
Karen Lamb (Mountain West Conference) (2002–2004)
2002	Karen Lamb	14–19	7–7	4th	—
2003	Karen Lamb	24–9	10–4	3rd	NCAA Second Round
2004	Karen Lamb	19–11	9–5	3rd	—
Karen Lamb:		57–39	19–9		
Jason Watson (Mountain West Conference) (2005–2007)
2005	Jason Watson	25–4	14–2	1st	NCAA First Round
2006	Jason Watson	25–6	13–3	2nd	NCAA Second Round
2007	Jason Watson	24–8	18–4	2nd	NCAA Elite Eight
Jason Watson:		74–18	45–9		
Shay Goulding (Mountain West Conference) (2008–2010)
2008	Shay Goulding	14–12	7–9	6th	—
2009	Shay Goulding	15–14	9–7	5th	—
2010	Shay Goulding	14–16	9–7	4th	—
Shay Goulding:		43–42	25–23		
Shawn Olmstead (West Coast Conference) (2011–2014)
2011	Shawn Olmstead	21–9	10–6	3rd	—
2012	Shawn Olmstead	28–4	13–3	1st	NCAA Sweet Sixteen
2013	Shawn Olmstead	24–7	15–3	2nd	NCAA Sweet Sixteen
2014	Shawn Olmstead	30–5	16–2	1st	NCAA Runner-up
Shawn Olmstead:		103–25	54–14		
Heather Olmstead (West Coast Conference) (2015–2022)
2015	Heather Olmstead	28–4	16–2	1st	NCAA Sweet Sixteen
2016	Heather Olmstead	29–4	16–2	1st	NCAA Sweet Sixteen
2017	Heather Olmstead	30–3	17–1	1st	NCAA Sweet Sixteen
2018	Heather Olmstead	31–2	17–1	1st	NCAA Final Four
2019	Heather Olmstead	26–5	16–2	2nd	NCAA Second Round
2020	Heather Olmstead	17–2	15–1	1st	NCAA Sweet Sixteen
2021	Heather Olmstead	30–2	18–0	1st	NCAA Sweet Sixteen
2022	Heather Olmstead	22–7	15–3	2nd	NCAA Second Round
Heather Olmstead:		213–29	130–12		
Heather Olmstead (Big 12 Conference) (2023–2025)
2023	Heather Olmstead	25–7	13–5	3rd	NCAA Second Round
2024	Heather Olmstead	19–10	12–6	6th	NCAA First Round
2025	Heather Olmstead	22–9	10–8	6th	NCAA First Round
Heather Olmstead:		66-26	35–19		
Rob Neilson (Big 12 Conference) (2026–present)
2026	Rob Neilson	20–1	12–0	1st	
Rob Neilson:		0–0	0–0		
Total:		1,443–404–5			
National champion Postseason invitational champion Conference regular season champion Conference regular season and conference tournament champion Division regular season champion Division regular season and conference tournament champion Conference tournament champion
