= 2016 NCAA Division I women's volleyball tournament =

Volleyball competition

2016 NCAA women's Division I volleyball tournament
- 2016 NCAA Division 1 Women's Volleyball Championship
- Finals site: Nationwide Arena; Columbus, Ohio
- Champions: Stanford (7th title)
- Runner-up: Texas (6th title match)
- Semifinalists: Minnesota (5th Final Four); Nebraska (13th Final Four)
- Winning coach: John Dunning (5th title)
- Most outstanding player: Inky Ajanaku (Stanford)
- Final Four All-Tournament Team: Jenna Gray (Stanford); Morgan Hentz (Stanford); Kathryn Plummer (Stanford); Micaya White (Texas); Ebony Nwanebu (Texas); Sarah Wilhite (Minnesota)

The 2016 NCAA Division I women's volleyball tournament began on December 1, 2016 and concluded on December 17 at Nationwide Arena in Columbus, Ohio. The tournament field was determined on November 27, 2016. Stanford defeated Texas 3 sets to 1 in the final to claim their seventh title, tying them with Penn State for most all-time.

== Qualifying teams ==
The champions of the NCAA's 32 conferences qualified automatically, while the remaining 32 positions were filled with at-large selections. The Big Ten and Pac-12 led all conferences with eight teams each in the field, followed by the Big 12, which placed six teams.

=== Records ===
Lincoln Regional
Seed	School	Conference	Berth Type	RPI	Record
	Arizona	Pac-12	At-Large	36	18-14
	Cleveland State	Horizon	Automatic	37	25-5
	Colorado State	Mountain West	At-Large	46	21-8
	Dayton	A-10	Automatic	28	30-1
	Fairfield	MAAC	Automatic	119	28-5
	Kentucky	SEC	At-Large	19	22-7
	LIU Brooklyn	NEC	Automatic	196	16-14
9	Michigan State	Big Ten	At-Large	15	24-8
1	Nebraska	Big Ten	Automatic	3	27-2
	New Hampshire	America East	Automatic	139	21-10
16	Penn State	Big Ten	At-Large	26	22-9
	Pittsburgh	ACC	At-Large	39	24-8
	TCU	Big 12	At-Large	20	14-12
	Texas A&M–Corpus Christi	Southland	Automatic	60	24-7
8	Washington	Pac-12	Automatic	6	26-4
	Wichita State	MVC	Automatic	21	24-7

Madison Regional
Seed	School	Conference	Berth Type	RPI	Record
	Alabama State	SWAC	Automatic	194	24-8
	Boise State	Mountain West	Automatic	32	25-6
	Cincinnati	The American	At-Large	38	22-9
	Denver	The Summit	Automatic	110	23-8
11	Florida	SEC	Automatic	10	26-3
	Florida State	ACC	At-Large	22	24-5
	Howard	MEAC	Automatic	159	26-5
14	Kansas State	Big 12	At-Large	18	20-9
	Lipscomb	ASUN	Automatic	52	22-7
	Marquette	Big East	At-Large	41	23-8
	Missouri State	MVC	At-Large	44	26-8
	Ohio State	Big Ten	At-Large	34	20-12
6	Stanford	Pac-12	At-Large	11	21-7
	Washington State	Pac-12	At-Large	43	21-11
	Western Kentucky	C-USA	Automatic	14	30-2
3	Wisconsin	Big Ten	At-Large	1	25-4

Austin Regional
Seed	School	Conference	Berth Type	RPI	Record
	American	Patriot	Automatic	86	27-7
13	BYU	West Coast	Automatic	7	27-3
	Creighton	Big East	Automatic	17	26-6
5	Kansas	Big 12	Automatic	5	26-2
	Miami (OH)	MAC	At-Large	40	24-6
12	Michigan	Big Ten	At-Large	13	22-10
	Northern Iowa	MVC	At-Large	45	24-9
	Oregon	Pac-12	At-Large	24	20-9
	Princeton	Ivy League	Automatic	78	19-4
	Samford	SoCon	Automatic	129	21-13
	SMU	The American	Automatic	30	25-7
4	Texas	Big 12	At-Large	4	22-4
	Texas A&M	SEC	At-Large	25	21-8
	UNLV	Mountain West	At-Large	33	23-7
	Utah	Pac-12	At-Large	31	20-11
	UTRGV	WAC	Automatic	123	21-13

Minneapolis Regional
Seed	School	Conference	Berth Type	RPI	Record
	Baylor	Big 12	At-Large	42	21-11
	Coastal Carolina	Sun Belt	Automatic	35	27-4
	Hawaiʻi	Big West	Automatic	23	22-5
	High Point	Big South	Automatic	109	23-9
	Iowa State	Big 12	At-Large	27	18-10
	James Madison	CAA	Automatic	50	21-10
2	Minnesota	Big Ten	At-Large	2	25-4
15	Missouri	SEC	At-Large	9	25-5
	Murray State	Ohio Valley	Automatic	96	23-8
7	North Carolina	ACC	Automatic	8	27-3
	North Dakota	Big Sky	Automatic	98	26-9
	Northern Illinois	MAC	Automatic	51	25-5
	Purdue	Big Ten	At-Large	29	18-13
	San Diego	West Coast	At-Large	16	24-5
10	UCLA	Pac-12	At-Large	12	24-6
	USC	Pac-12	At-Large	48	18-13

== Bracket ==
The first two rounds are held on campus sites (the home court of the seeded team). Regional semifinals and finals were held at four non-predetermined campus sites, which would be announced after play concluded, on December 3.

=== Lincoln Regional ===
First round
1	Nebraska	3
New Hampshire	0
Lincoln, NE
Wichita State	1
TCU	3
16	Penn State	3
LIU Brooklyn	0
University Park, PA
Pittsburgh	3
Dayton	1
8	Washington	3
A&M-Corpus Christi	0
Seattle, WA
Kentucky	3
Colorado State	1
9	Michigan State	3
Fairfield	0
East Lansing, MI
Cleveland State	0
Arizona	3

Second round
1	Nebraska	3
TCU	0
16	Penn State	3
Pittsburgh	1
8	Washington	3
Kentucky	0
9	Michigan State	2
Arizona	3

Regional semifinals
1	Nebraska	3
16	Penn State	2
8	Washington	3
Arizona	0

Regional finals
1	Nebraska	3
8	Washington	0

=== Schedule ===
==== First round ====
December 2, 2016; 5:30 PM	Wichita State	1-3	TCU	Bob Devaney Sports Center, Lincoln, Nebraska; Attendance: 8,014
December 2, 2016; 5:30 PM	(17-25, 23-25, 25-22, 20-25)			Bob Devaney Sports Center, Lincoln, Nebraska; Attendance: 8,014

December 2, 2016; 8:00 PM	Nebraska	3-0	New Hampshire	Bob Devaney Sports Center, Lincoln, Nebraska; Attendance: 8,014
December 2, 2016; 8:00 PM	(25-9, 25-23, 25-18)			Bob Devaney Sports Center, Lincoln, Nebraska; Attendance: 8,014

December 2, 2016; 5:00 PM	Pittsburgh	3-1	Dayton	Rec Hall, University Park, Pennsylvania; Attendance: 1,735
December 2, 2016; 5:00 PM	(20-25, 25-19, 27-25, 25-19)			Rec Hall, University Park, Pennsylvania; Attendance: 1,735

December 2, 2016; 7:30 PM	Penn State	3-0	LIU Brooklyn	Rec Hall, University Park, Pennsylvania; Attendance: 1,735
December 2, 2016; 7:30 PM	(25-8, 25-16, 25-6)			Rec Hall, University Park, Pennsylvania; Attendance: 1,735

December 2, 2016; 8:00 PM	Kentucky	3-0	Colorado State	Alaska Airlines Arena, Seattle, Washington; Attendance: 2,042
December 2, 2016; 8:00 PM	(24-26, 25-22, 25-10, 25-17)			Alaska Airlines Arena, Seattle, Washington; Attendance: 2,042

December 2, 2016; 10:30 PM	Washington	3-0	Texas A&M Corpus Christi	Alaska Airlines Arena, Seattle, Washington; Attendance: 2,042
December 2, 2016; 10:30 PM	(25-18, 25-14, 25-14)			Alaska Airlines Arena, Seattle, Washington; Attendance: 2,042

December 1, 2016; 5:00 PM	Cleveland State	0-3	Arizona	Jenison Fieldhouse, East Lansing, Michigan; Attendance: 2,484
December 1, 2016; 5:00 PM	(14-25, 17-25, 13-25)			Jenison Fieldhouse, East Lansing, Michigan; Attendance: 2,484

December 2, 2016; 7:30 PM	Michigan State	3-0	Fairfield	Jenison Fieldhouse, East Lansing, Michigan; Attendance: 2,484
December 2, 2016; 7:30 PM	(25-14, 25-13, 25-15)			Jenison Fieldhouse, East Lansing, Michigan; Attendance: 2,484

==== Second round ====
December 3, 2016; 8:00 PM	Nebraska	3-0	TCU	Bob Devaney Sports Center, Lincoln, Nebraska; Attendance: 8,024
December 3, 2016; 8:00 PM	(25-22, 25-12, 25-16)			Bob Devaney Sports Center, Lincoln, Nebraska; Attendance: 8,024

December 3, 2016; 6:30 PM	Penn State	3-1	Pittsburgh	Rec Hall, University Park, Pennsylvania; Attendance: 1,537
December 3, 2016; 6:30 PM	(20-25, 25-16, 25-13, 25-18)			Rec Hall, University Park, Pennsylvania; Attendance: 1,537

December 3, 2016; 10:30 PM	Washington	3-0	Kentucky	Alaska Airlines Arena, Seattle, Washington; Attendance: 2,572
December 3, 2016; 10:30 PM	(25-21, 25-11, 25-10)			Alaska Airlines Arena, Seattle, Washington; Attendance: 2,572

December 3, 2016; 7:30 PM	Michigan State	3-0	Arizona	Jenison Fieldhouse, East Lansing, Michigan; Attendance: 2,357
December 3, 2016; 7:30 PM	(25-17, 16-25, 19-25, 26-24, 10-15)			Jenison Fieldhouse, East Lansing, Michigan; Attendance: 2,357

==== Regional semifinals ====
December 9, 2016; 12:00 PM	Nebraska	3-2	Penn State	Bob Devaney Sports Center, Lincoln, Nebraska; Attendance: 8,240
December 9, 2016; 12:00 PM	(23-25, 23-25, 26-24, 25-19, 15-6)			Bob Devaney Sports Center, Lincoln, Nebraska; Attendance: 8,240

December 9, 2016; 2:30 PM	Washington	3-0	Arizona	Bob Devaney Sports Center, Lincoln, Nebraska; Attendance: 8,240
December 9, 2016; 2:30 PM	(25-15, 25-22, 25-18)			Bob Devaney Sports Center, Lincoln, Nebraska; Attendance: 8,240

==== Regional Final ====
December 10, 2016; 4:00 PM	Nebraska	3-0	Washington	Bob Devaney Sports Center, Lincoln, Nebraska; Attendance: 8,355
December 10, 2016; 4:00 PM	(25-16, 25-10, 25-21)			Bob Devaney Sports Center, Lincoln, Nebraska; Attendance: 8,355

=== Austin Regional ===
First round
4	Texas	3
UT-Rio Grande Valley	0
Austin, TX
Texas A&M	0
Southern Methodist	3
13	BYU	3
Princeton	0
Provo, UT
UNLV	3
Utah	1
5	Kansas	3
Samford	0
Lawrence, KS
Northern Iowa	2
Creighton	3
12	Michigan	3
American	0
Ann Arbor, MI
Oregon	3
Miami (OH)	1

Second round
4	Texas	3
Southern Methodist	0
13	BYU	3
UNLV	0
5	Kansas	2
Creighton	3
12	Michigan	3
Oregon	1

Regional semifinals
4	Texas	3
13	BYU	2
Creighton	3
12	Michigan	2

Regional finals
4	Texas	3
Creighton	0

=== Schedule ===
==== First round ====
December 2, 2016; 5:00 PM	Texas A&M	0-3	SMU	Gregory Gymnasium, Austin, Texas
December 2, 2016; 5:00 PM	(23-25, 23-25, 18-25)			Gregory Gymnasium, Austin, Texas

December 2, 2016; 7:30 PM	Texas	3-0	UTRGV	Gregory Gymnasium, Austin, Texas; Attendance: NA
December 2, 2016; 7:30 PM	(25-14, 25-16, 25-17)			Gregory Gymnasium, Austin, Texas; Attendance: NA

December 2, 2016; 7:00 PM	UNLV	3-1	Utah	Smith Fieldhouse, Provo, Utah
December 2, 2016; 7:00 PM	(27-25, 25-21, 19-25, 25-20)			Smith Fieldhouse, Provo, Utah

December 2, 2016; 9:00 PM	BYU	3-0	Princeton	Smith Fieldhouse, Provo, Utah; Attendance: 2,696
December 2, 2016; 9:00 PM	(25-22, 25-15, 25-23)			Smith Fieldhouse, Provo, Utah; Attendance: 2,696

December 1, 2016; 5:00 PM	Northern Iowa	2-3	Creighton	Horejsi Family Athletics Center, Lawrence, Kansas; Attendance: 900
December 1, 2016; 5:00 PM	(16-25, 20-25, 26-24, 25-14, 12-15)			Horejsi Family Athletics Center, Lawrence, Kansas; Attendance: 900

December 1, 2016; 7:30 PM	Kansas	3-0	Samford	Horejsi Family Athletics Center, Lawrence, Kansas; Attendance: 1,302
December 1, 2016; 7:30 PM	(25-19, 25-21, 25-17)			Horejsi Family Athletics Center, Lawrence, Kansas; Attendance: 1,302

December 1, 2016; 5:30 PM	Oregon	3-1	Miami (OH)	Crisler Center, Ann Arbor, Michigan; Attendance: 604
December 1, 2016; 5:30 PM	(25-22, 25-17, 22-25, 25-19)			Crisler Center, Ann Arbor, Michigan; Attendance: 604

December 1, 2016; 7:30 PM	Michigan	3-0	American	Crisler Center, Ann Arbor, Michigan; Attendance: 1,641
December 1, 2016; 7:30 PM	(25-13, 25-23, 25-12)			Crisler Center, Ann Arbor, Michigan; Attendance: 1,641

==== Second round ====
December 2, 2016; 7:30 PM	Kansas	2-3	Creighton	Horejsi Family Athletics Center, Lawrence, Kansas; Attendance: 1,302
December 2, 2016; 7:30 PM	(25-21, 20-25, 17-25, 25-16, 18-20)			Horejsi Family Athletics Center, Lawrence, Kansas; Attendance: 1,302

December 2, 2016; 7:30 PM	Michigan	3-1	Oregon	Crisler Center, Ann Arbor, Michigan; Attendance: 2,072
December 2, 2016; 7:30 PM	(22-25, 25-17, 25-12, 25-17)			Crisler Center, Ann Arbor, Michigan; Attendance: 2,072

December 3, 2016; 8:00 PM	Texas	3-0	SMU	Gregory Gymnasium, Austin, Texas; Attendance: 3,394
December 3, 2016; 8:00 PM	(25-15, 25-18, 25-12)			Gregory Gymnasium, Austin, Texas; Attendance: 3,394

December 3, 2016; 9:00 PM	BYU	3-0	UNLV	Smith Fieldhouse, Provo, Utah; Attendance: 2,049
December 3, 2016; 9:00 PM	(25-23, 25-21, 25-12)			Smith Fieldhouse, Provo, Utah; Attendance: 2,049

==== Regional semifinals ====
December 9, 2016; 4:00 PM	Texas	3-2	BYU	Gregory Gymnasium, Austin, Texas; Attendance: 3,478
December 9, 2016; 4:00 PM	(25-23, 25-14, 24-26, 22-25, 16-14)			Gregory Gymnasium, Austin, Texas; Attendance: 3,478

December 9, 2016; 6:30 PM	Creighton	3-2	Michigan	Gregory Gymnasium, Austin, Texas; Attendance: 3,478
December 9, 2016; 6:30 PM	(24-26, 25-21, 17-25, 25-20, 15-7)			Gregory Gymnasium, Austin, Texas; Attendance: 3,478

==== Regional Final ====
December 10, 2016; 8:00 PM	Texas	3-0	Creighton	Gregory Gymnasium, Austin, Texas; Attendance: 4,336
December 10, 2016; 8:00 PM	(25-19, 25-20, 25-11)			Gregory Gymnasium, Austin, Texas; Attendance: 4,336

=== Madison Regional ===
First round
3	Wisconsin	3
Howard	0
Madison, WI
Marquette	1
Washington State	3
14	Kansas State	3
Lipscomb	0
Manhattan, KS
Ohio State	3
Missouri State	0
6	Stanford	3
Denver	0
Stanford, CA
Western Kentucky	0
Boise State	3
11	Florida	3
Alabama State	0
Gainesville, FL
Cincinnati	1
Florida State	3

Second round
3	Wisconsin	3
Washington State	0
14	Kansas State	2
Ohio State	3
6	Stanford	3
Boise State	0
11	Florida	2
Florida State	3

Regional semifinals
3	Wisconsin	3
Ohio State	2
6	Stanford	3
Florida State	1

Regional finals
3	Wisconsin	2
6	Stanford	3

=== Schedule ===
==== First round ====
December 1, 2016; 6:00 PM	Marquette	1-3	Washington State	Wisconsin Field House, Madison, Wisconsin; Attendance: 5,183
December 1, 2016; 6:00 PM	(21-25, 25-22, 19-25, 20-25)			Wisconsin Field House, Madison, Wisconsin; Attendance: 5,183

December 1, 2016; 8:30 PM	Wisconsin	3-0	Howard	Wisconsin Field House, Madison, Wisconsin; Attendance: 5,183
December 1, 2016; 8:30 PM	(25-11, 25-18, 25-10)			Wisconsin Field House, Madison, Wisconsin; Attendance: 5,183

December 2, 2016; 6:00 PM	Ohio State	3-0	Missouri State	Bramlage Coliseum, Manhattan, Kansas; Attendance: 2,447
December 2, 2016; 6:00 PM	(25-21, 25-13, 31-29)			Bramlage Coliseum, Manhattan, Kansas; Attendance: 2,447

December 2, 2016; 8:30 PM	Kansas State	3-0	Lipscomb	Bramlage Coliseum, Manhattan, Kansas; Attendance: 2,447
December 2, 2016; 8:30 PM	(28-26, 25-15, 26-24)			Bramlage Coliseum, Manhattan, Kansas; Attendance: 2,447

December 2, 2016; 7:30 PM	Western Kentucky	0-3	Boise State	Maples Pavilion, Palo Alto, California; Attendance: 1,346
December 2, 2016; 7:30 PM	(26-28, 22-25, 25-27)			Maples Pavilion, Palo Alto, California; Attendance: 1,346

December 2, 2016; 10:00 PM	Stanford	3-0	Denver	Maples Pavilion, Palo Alto, California; Attendance: 1,346
December 2, 2016; 10:00 PM	(25-12, 25-22, 25-20)			Maples Pavilion, Palo Alto, California; Attendance: 1,346

December 2, 2016; 4:30 PM	Cincinnati	1-3	Florida State	Lemerand Athletic Center, Gainesville, Florida; Attendance: 400
December 2, 2016; 4:30 PM	(25-20, 14-25, 23-25, 23-25)			Lemerand Athletic Center, Gainesville, Florida; Attendance: 400

December 2, 2016; 7:00 PM	Florida	3-0	Alabama State	Lemerand Athletic Center, Gainesville, Florida; Attendance: 807
December 2, 2016; 7:00 PM	(25-15, 25-13, 25-9)			Lemerand Athletic Center, Gainesville, Florida; Attendance: 807

==== Second round ====
December 1, 2016; 8:00 PM	Wisconsin	3-0	Washington State	Wisconsin Field House, Madison, Wisconsin; Attendance: 5,898
December 1, 2016; 8:00 PM	(25-18, 25-18, 25-17)			Wisconsin Field House, Madison, Wisconsin; Attendance: 5,898

December 2, 2016; 8:00 PM	Kansas State	2-3	Ohio State	Bramlage Coliseum, Manhattan, Kansas; Attendance: 2,645
December 2, 2016; 8:00 PM	(20-25, 22-25, 25-22, 25-23, 15-17)			Bramlage Coliseum, Manhattan, Kansas; Attendance: 2,645

December 2, 2016; 10:00 PM	Stanford	3-0	Boise State	Maples Pavilion, Palo Alto, California; Attendance: 1,250
December 2, 2016; 10:00 PM	(25-11, 25-22, 25-18)			Maples Pavilion, Palo Alto, California; Attendance: 1,250

December 2, 2016; 7:30 PM	Florida	2-3	Florida State	Lemerand Athletic Center, Gainesville, Florida; Attendance: 991
December 2, 2016; 7:30 PM	(25-13, 25-16, 23-25, 19-25, 12-15)			Lemerand Athletic Center, Gainesville, Florida; Attendance: 991

==== Regional semifinals ====
December 9, 2016; 2:00 PM	Wisconsin	3-2	Ohio State	Wisconsin Field House, Madison, Wisconsin; Attendance: 6,012
December 9, 2016; 2:00 PM	(25-15, 22-25, 29-31, 25-22, 15-13)			Wisconsin Field House, Madison, Wisconsin; Attendance: 6,012

December 9, 2016; 4:30 PM	Stanford	3-1	Florida State	Wisconsin Field House, Madison, Wisconsin; Attendance: 6,012
December 9, 2016; 4:30 PM	(25-27, 25-20, 25-9, 25-23)			Wisconsin Field House, Madison, Wisconsin; Attendance: 6,012

==== Regional Final ====
December 10, 2016; 6:00 PM	Wisconsin	2-3	Stanford	Wisconsin Field House, Madison, Wisconsin; Attendance: 6,012
December 10, 2016; 6:00 PM	(25-18, 26-24, 21-25, 21-25, 9-15)			Wisconsin Field House, Madison, Wisconsin; Attendance: 6,012

=== Minneapolis Regional ===
First round
2	Minnesota	3
North Dakota	0
Minneapolis–Saint Paul, MN
Hawaii	3
USC	2
15	Missouri	3
Northern Illinois	0
Columbia, MO
Purdue	3
Iowa State	0
7	North Carolina	3
High Point	0
Chapel Hill, NC
James Madison	2
Coastal Carolina	3
10	UCLA	3
Murray State	1
Los Angeles, CA
San Diego	2
Baylor	3

Second round
2	Minnesota	3
Hawaii	0
15	Missouri	3
Purdue	1
7	North Carolina	3
Coastal Carolina	0
10	UCLA	3
Baylor	0

Regional semifinals
2	Minnesota	3
15	Missouri	1
7	North Carolina	1
10	UCLA	3

Regional finals
2	Minnesota	3
10	UCLA	0

=== Schedule ===
==== First round ====
December 2, 2016; 5:30 PM	Hawaii	3-2	Southern Cal	Maturi Pavilion, Minneapolis, Minnesota
December 2, 2016; 5:30 PM	(25-22, 25-20, 22-25, 16-25, 15-13)			Maturi Pavilion, Minneapolis, Minnesota

December 2, 2016; 8:00 PM	Minnesota	3-0	North Dakota	Maturi Pavilion, Minneapolis, Minnesota; Attendance: 5,366
December 2, 2016; 8:00 PM	(25-21, 25-12, 25-20)			Maturi Pavilion, Minneapolis, Minnesota; Attendance: 5,366

December 1, 2016; 5:30 PM	Purdue	3-0	Iowa State	Hearnes Center, Columbia, Missouri
December 1, 2016; 5:30 PM	(26-24, 25-21, 25-13)			Hearnes Center, Columbia, Missouri

December 1, 2016; 7:30 PM	Missouri	3-0	Northern Illinois	Hearnes Center, Columbia, Missouri; Attendance: 2,119
December 1, 2016; 7:30 PM	(25-16, 25-13, 25-20)			Hearnes Center, Columbia, Missouri; Attendance: 2,119

December 2, 2016; 4:30 PM	James Madison	2-3	Coastal Carolina	Carmichael Arena, Chapel Hill, North Carolina
December 2, 2016; 4:30 PM	(25-19, 18-25, 18-25, 25-17, 9-15)			Carmichael Arena, Chapel Hill, North Carolina

December 2, 2016; 6:30 PM	North Carolina	3-0	High Point	Carmichael Arena, Chapel Hill, North Carolina; Attendance: 1,650
December 2, 2016; 6:30 PM	(25-13, 25-12, 25-23)			Carmichael Arena, Chapel Hill, North Carolina; Attendance: 1,650

December 2, 2016; 8:30 PM	San Diego	2-3	Baylor	Pauley Pavilion, Los Angeles, California
December 2, 2016; 8:30 PM	(25-16, 18-25, 25-17, 20-25, 13-15)			Pauley Pavilion, Los Angeles, California

December 2, 2016; 11:00 PM	UCLA	3-1	Murray State	Pauley Pavilion, Los Angeles, California; Attendance: 896
December 2, 2016; 11:00 PM	(21-25, 25-18, 25-15, 25-9)			Pauley Pavilion, Los Angeles, California; Attendance: 896

==== Second round ====
December 2, 2016; 7:00 PM	Missouri	3-1	Purdue	Hearnes Center, Columbia, Missouri; Attendance: 2,704
December 2, 2016; 7:00 PM	(25-13, 22-25, 25-16, 25-21)			Hearnes Center, Columbia, Missouri; Attendance: 2,704

December 3, 2016; 6:00 PM	North Carolina	3-0	Coastal Carolina	Carmichael Arena, Chapel Hill, North Carolina; Attendance: 1,521
December 3, 2016; 6:00 PM	(23-25, 25-19, 25-17, 25-16)			Carmichael Arena, Chapel Hill, North Carolina; Attendance: 1,521

December 3, 2016; 7:00 PM	Minnesota	3-0	Hawaii	Maturi Pavilion, Minneapolis, Minnesota; Attendance: 5,442
December 3, 2016; 7:00 PM	(25-17, 25-17, 25-19)			Maturi Pavilion, Minneapolis, Minnesota; Attendance: 5,442

December 3, 2016; 10:00 PM	UCLA	3-0	Baylor	Pauley Pavilion, Los Angeles, California; Attendance: 1,018
December 3, 2016; 10:00 PM	(25-21, 25-20, 25-20)			Pauley Pavilion, Los Angeles, California; Attendance: 1,018

==== Regional semifinals ====
December 9, 2016; 8:15 PM	Minnesota	3-1	Missouri	Maturi Pavilion, Minneapolis, Minnesota; Attendance: 5,309
December 9, 2016; 8:15 PM	(25-15, 21-25, 25-19, 25-14)			Maturi Pavilion, Minneapolis, Minnesota; Attendance: 5,309

December 9, 2016; 10:45 PM	North Carolina	1-3	UCLA	Maturi Pavilion, Minneapolis, Minnesota; Attendance: 5,309
December 9, 2016; 10:45 PM	(25-23, 22-25, 23-25, 26-28)			Maturi Pavilion, Minneapolis, Minnesota; Attendance: 5,309

==== Regional Final ====
December 10, 2016; 7:30 PM	Minnesota	3-0	UCLA	Maturi Pavilion, Minneapolis, Minnesota; Attendance: 5,392
December 10, 2016; 7:30 PM	(25-23, 25-20, 25-22)			Maturi Pavilion, Minneapolis, Minnesota; Attendance: 5,392

== Final Four ==
National semifinal and championship were held at Nationwide Arena, in Columbus, Ohio on December 15 and 17 respectively. The national semifinal matches, originally scheduled to be broadcast on ESPN2, were moved to ESPN.

National semifinals
1	Nebraska	0
4	Texas	3
2	Minnesota	1
6	Stanford	3

National Championship
4	Texas	1
6	Stanford	3

=== National semifinals ===
December 15, 2016; 9:30 PM	Nebraska	0-3	Texas	Nationwide Arena, Columbus, Ohio; Attendance: 16,670
December 15, 2016; 9:30 PM	(18-25, 23-25, 21-25)			Nationwide Arena, Columbus, Ohio; Attendance: 16,670

December 15, 2016; 7:00 PM	Stanford	3-1	Minnesota	Nationwide Arena, Columbus, Ohio; Attendance: 16,670
December 15, 2016; 7:00 PM	(26-24, 25-19, 22-25, 25-22)			Nationwide Arena, Columbus, Ohio; Attendance: 16,670

=== National Championship ===
December 17, 2016; 9:00 PM	Texas	1-3	Stanford	Nationwide Arena, Columbus, Ohio; Attendance: 17,345
December 17, 2016; 9:00 PM	(21-25, 19-25, 25-18, 21-25)			Nationwide Arena, Columbus, Ohio; Attendance: 17,345

== Record by conference ==
Conference	Teams	W	L	Pct.	R32	S16	E8	F4	CM	NC
Big Ten	8	19	8	.704	8	6	3	2	–	–
Pac-12	8	16	7	.696	6	4	3	1	1	1
ACC	3	5	3	.625	3	2	–	–	–	–
Big East	2	3	2	.600	1	1	1	–	–	–
Big 12	6	9	6	.600	5	1	1	1	1	–
WCC	2	2	2	.500	1	1	–	–	–	–
SEC	4	4	4	.500	3	1	–	–	–	–
Big West	1	1	1	.500	1	–	–	–	–	–
Sun Belt	1	1	1	.500	1	–	–	–	–	–
Mountain West	3	2	3	.400	2	–	–	–	–	–
The American	2	1	2	.333	1	–	–	–	–	–
Other	24	0	24	.000	–	–	–	–	–	–

The columns R32, S16, E8, F4, CM, and NC respectively stand for the Round of 32,
Sweet Sixteen, Elite Eight, Final Four, Championship Match, and National Champion.
