= Pacific Tigers =

Intercollegiate sports teams of University of the Pacific

- University: University of the Pacific
- Nickname: Tigers
- NCAA: Division I
- Conference: WCC (primary); Mountain Pacific Sports Federation (swimming and diving, men's volleyball from 2026–27); GCC (water polo)
- Athletic director: Adam Tschuor
- Location: Stockton, California
- Varsity teams: 21 (9 men's, 12 women's)
- Basketball arena: Alex G. Spanos Center
- Baseball stadium: Klein Family Field
- Softball stadium: Bill Simoni Field
- Soccer stadium: Knoles Field
- Aquatics center: Douglass berhardt Aquatics Center
- Tennis venue: Eve Zimmerman Center
- Volleyball arena: Alex G. Spanos Center
- Colors: Black and orange
- Mascot: Powercat
- Fight song: The Tiger Fight Song "Hungry Tigers"
- Website: pacifictigers.com

The Pacific Tigers represent the University of the Pacific in Stockton, California, in intercollegiate athletics. The Tigers compete in NCAA Division I, and are currently in their second stint as members of the West Coast Conference (WCC).

== Conference history ==
Pacific was one of the founding members of the West Coast Conference (originally the California Basketball Association and later the West Coast Athletic Conference) in 1952, but became a charter member of the Pacific Coast Athletic Association, now known as the Big West Conference, for football only in 1969 and moved the rest of its sports to the PCAA in 1971. The Tigers remained in the Big West until returning to the WCC on July 1, 2013.

== Sports sponsored ==
Men's sports	Women's sports
Baseball	Basketball
Basketball	Beach volleyball
Cross Country	Cross country
Golf	Soccer
Soccer	Softball
Swimming and Diving	Stunt
Tennis	Swimming and diving
Volleyball	Tennis
Water Polo	Track and field^{1}
	Volleyball
	Water polo
^{1} – includes both indoor and outdoor

== Programs history ==
Pacific women's volleyball captured the only two NCAA national championships in school history in back-to-back seasons in 1985 and 1986. Under head coaches Taras Liskevych and John Dunning, the Pacific women's volleyball program qualified for 24 consecutive NCAA Tournaments from 1981 to 2004 and advanced to 18 regionals and 7 final fours during that period.

The Pacific Tigers men's basketball program made five NCAA Tournament appearances under head coach Bob Thomason (1997, 2004, 2005, 2006 & 2013). Thomason became the winningest head coach in Big West Conference men's basketball history when he collected his 206th career league victory on February 14, 2009, surpassing the conference win total of former LBSU and UNLV head coach Jerry Tarkanian. Pacific also achieved a 16-game winning streak three times under Thomason.

The Pacific men's water polo program was ranked No. 1 in the nation throughout much of the 2013 season and battled the five-time defending champion USC Trojans for the NCAA title in an overtime thriller on December 8, 2013, eventually falling by a score of 12–11 in double overtime. Under the direction of head coach James Graham, the Tigers (23–5) joined Pacific women's volleyball as the only Tigers' program to earn a number one ranking, advance to the Final Four of their sport, and play in the NCAA Championship Game.

At the end of the 1995 season, Pacific ended its football program after 77 years of competition.

Pacific's softball team has appeared in one Women's College World Series in 1983.

On November 12, 2012, it was announced that Pacific would add three new sports teams to its roster – a men's soccer team, a women's track and field team and a women's beach volleyball team. The two women's sports began play in 2013, and the men's soccer team began play in 2014. The most recent changes in sports sponsorship were announced in December 2025—first the return of men's volleyball in the 2027 season (2026–27 school year) after having been dropped at the end of the 2014 season, soon followed by the addition of the all-female cheerleading discipline of stunt on the same timeline.

== Facilities ==
=== Current ===
Venue	Sport(s)	Open.	Capac.	Ref.
Klein Family Field	Baseball	2006	2,500	
Alex G. Spanos Center	Basketball; Volleyball	1981	5,634	
Knoles Field	Soccer	n/a	c. 1,000	
Bill Simoni Field	Softball	1993	350	
Douglass M. Eberhardt Aquatics Center	Swimming; Water polo	1973	1,184	
Eve Zimmerman Center	Tennis	2017	n/a	

=== Former ===
Venue	Sport(s)	Open.	Closed	Capac.	Ref.
Stagg Memorial Stadium	Football	1950	2012	28,000	

== Gallery ==
Pacific Tigers sports
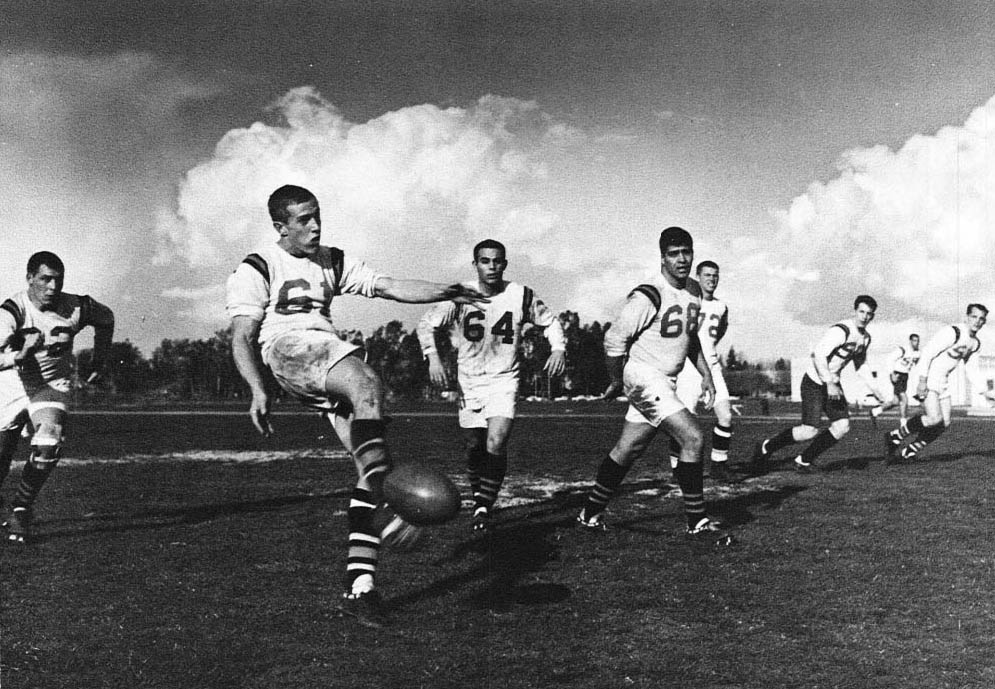
Rugby, 1961

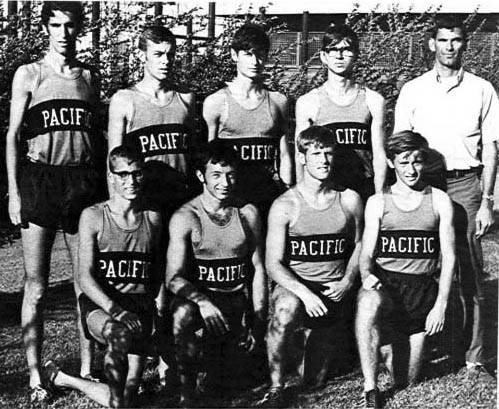
Running team, 1969

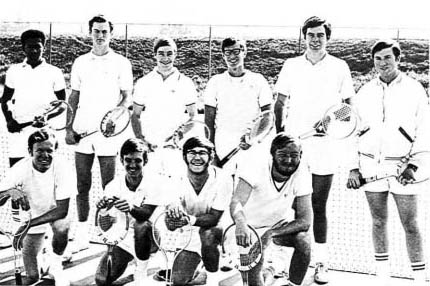
Tennis team, 1969

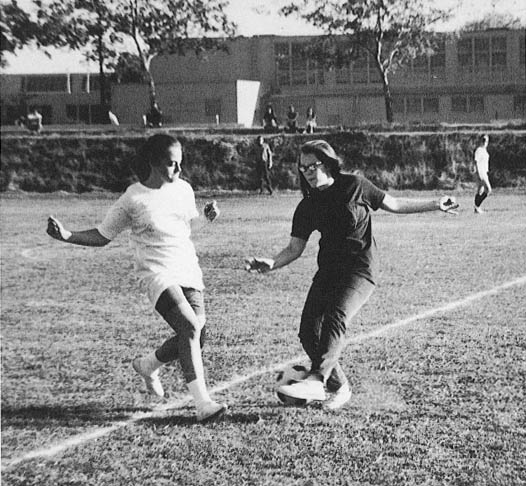
Soccer (women's), 1970

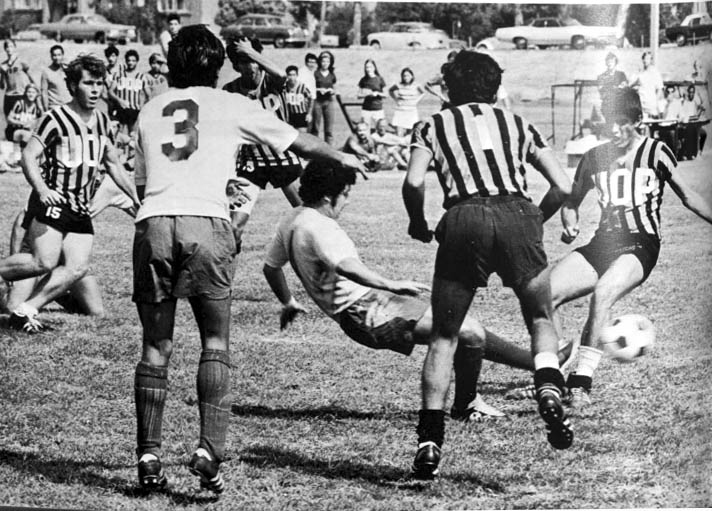
Soccer (men's), 1970

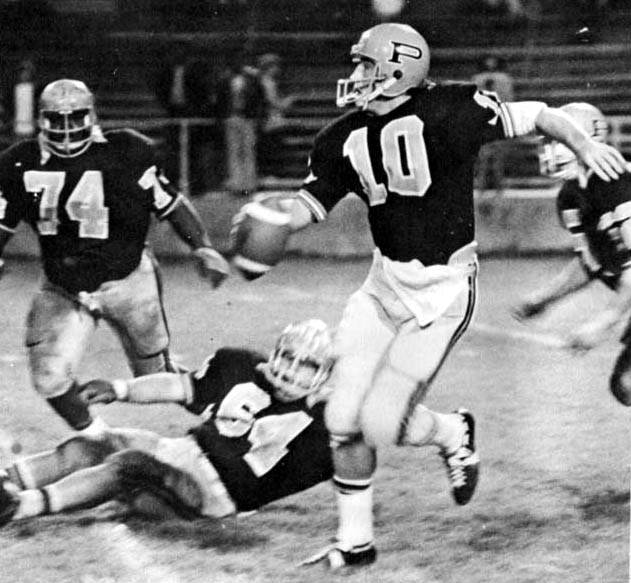
1973 football game

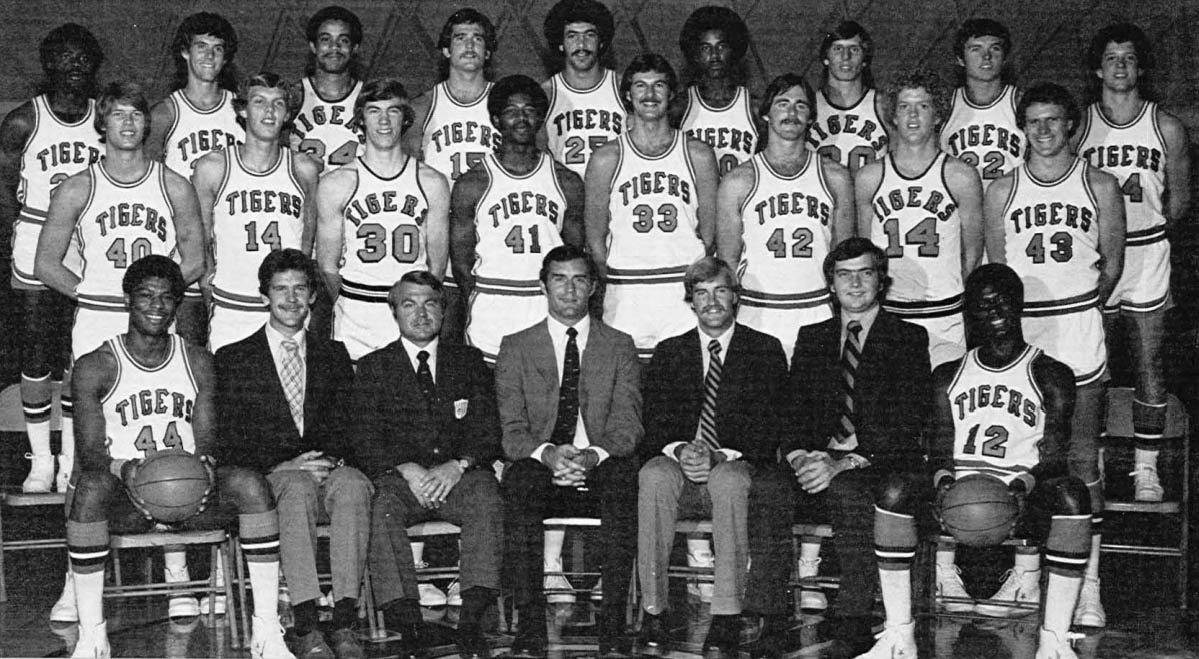
1976 basketball roster

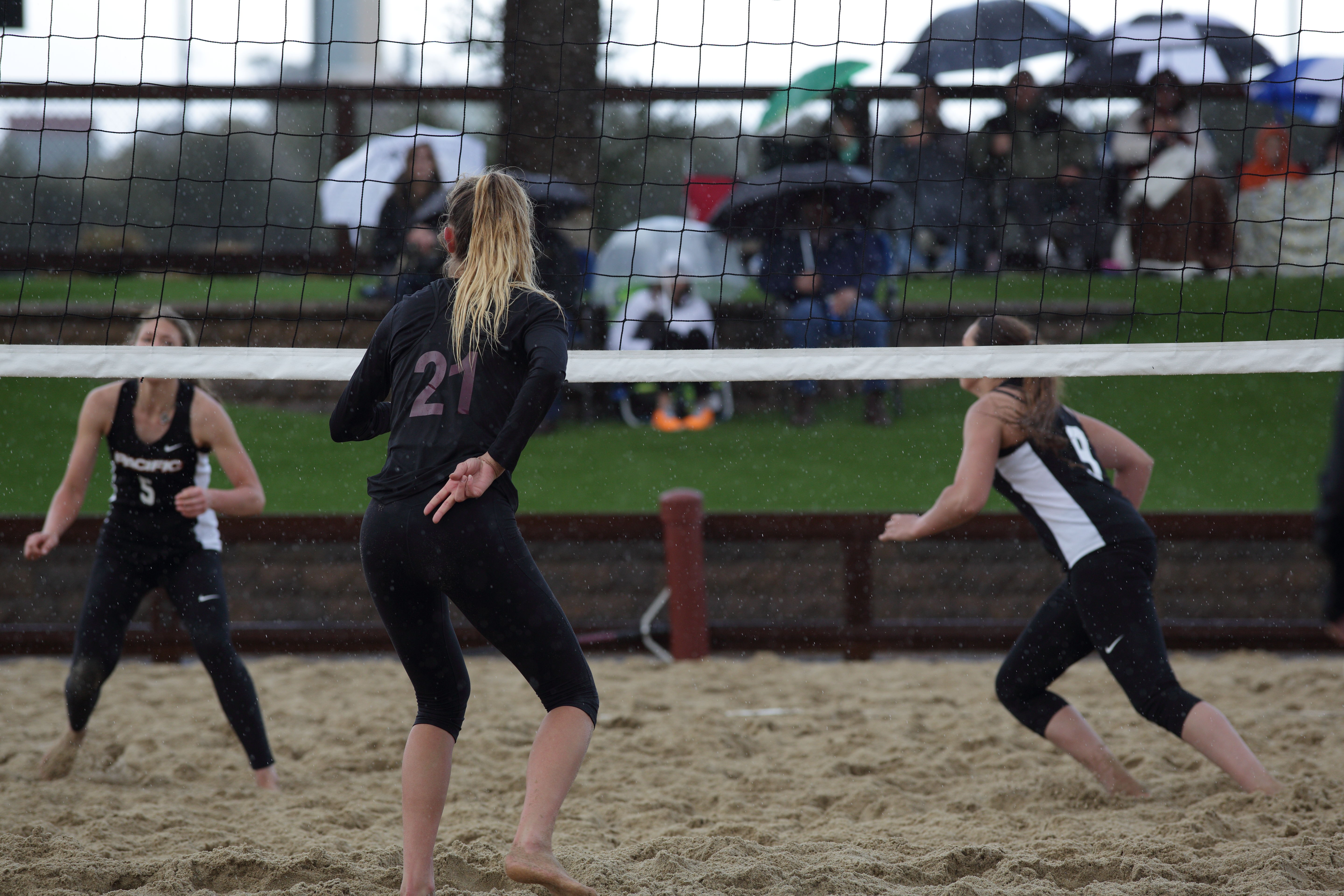
Beach volleyball, 2017

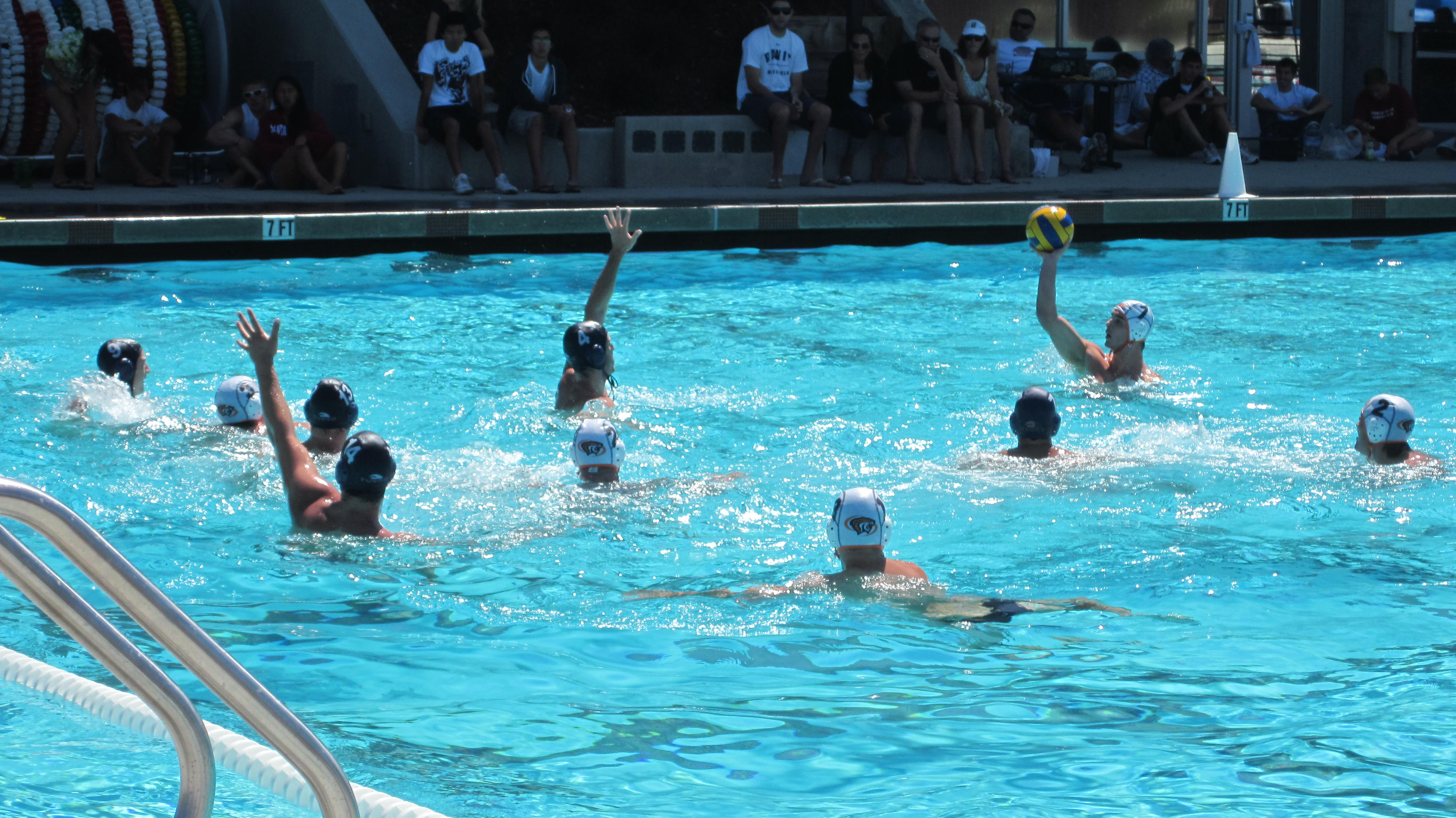
Water polo, 2010
