= Smith Fieldhouse =

Arena in Provo, Utah

George Albert Smith Fieldhouse
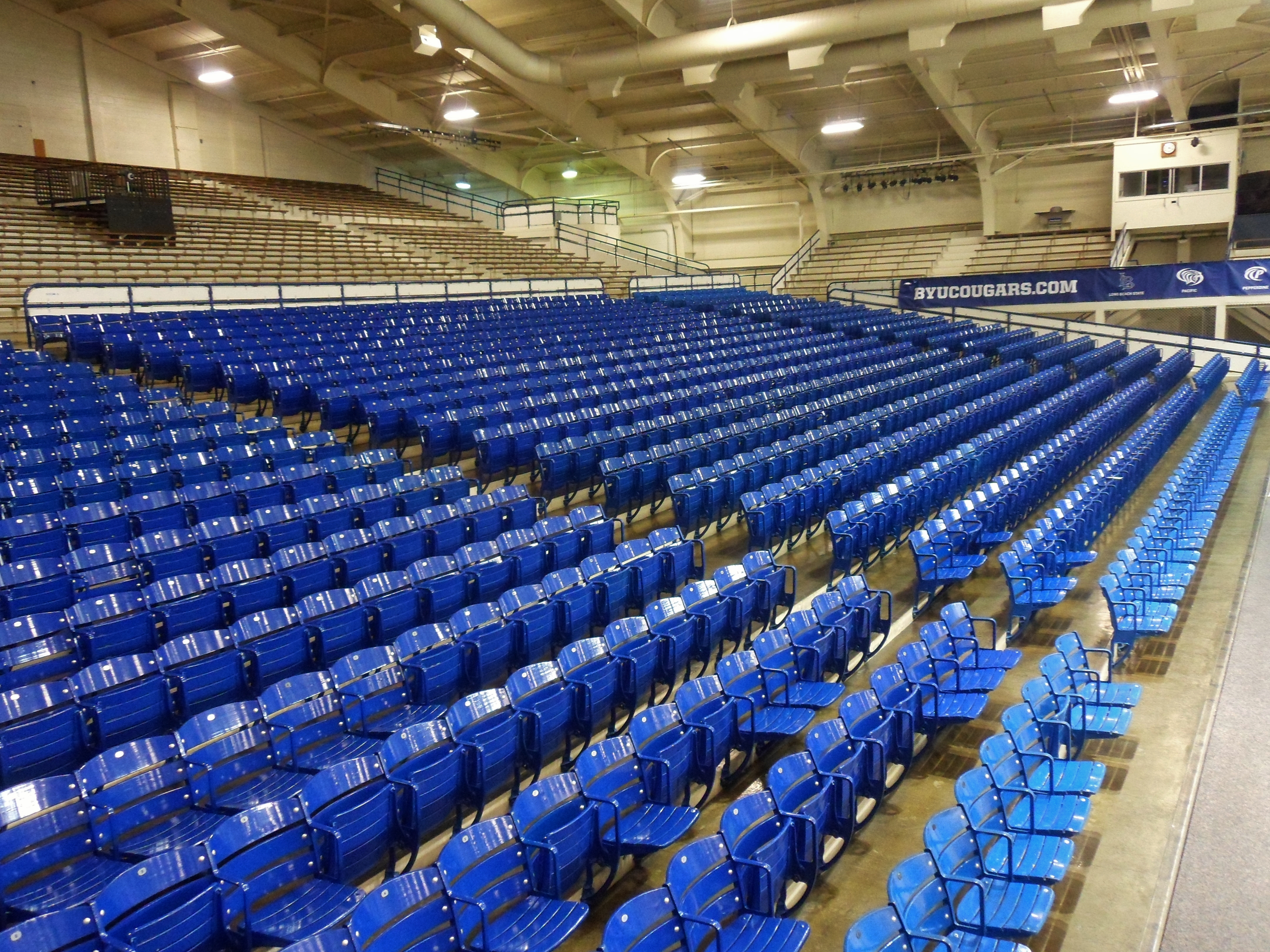
- Seating at the Smith Fieldhouse

- Location in the United States Location in Utah
- Address: 150 East 1230 North
- Location: Brigham Young University; Provo, Utah, U.S.
- Coordinates: 40.247°N 111.654°W
- Owner: Brigham Young University
- Capacity: 5,000
- Public transit: UVX

Construction
- Opened: 1951; 75 years ago

Tenants
- BYU men's volleyball BYU women's volleyball

The George Albert Smith Fieldhouse (SFH) is a 5,000 seat multi-purpose arena in Provo, Utah.

== History ==
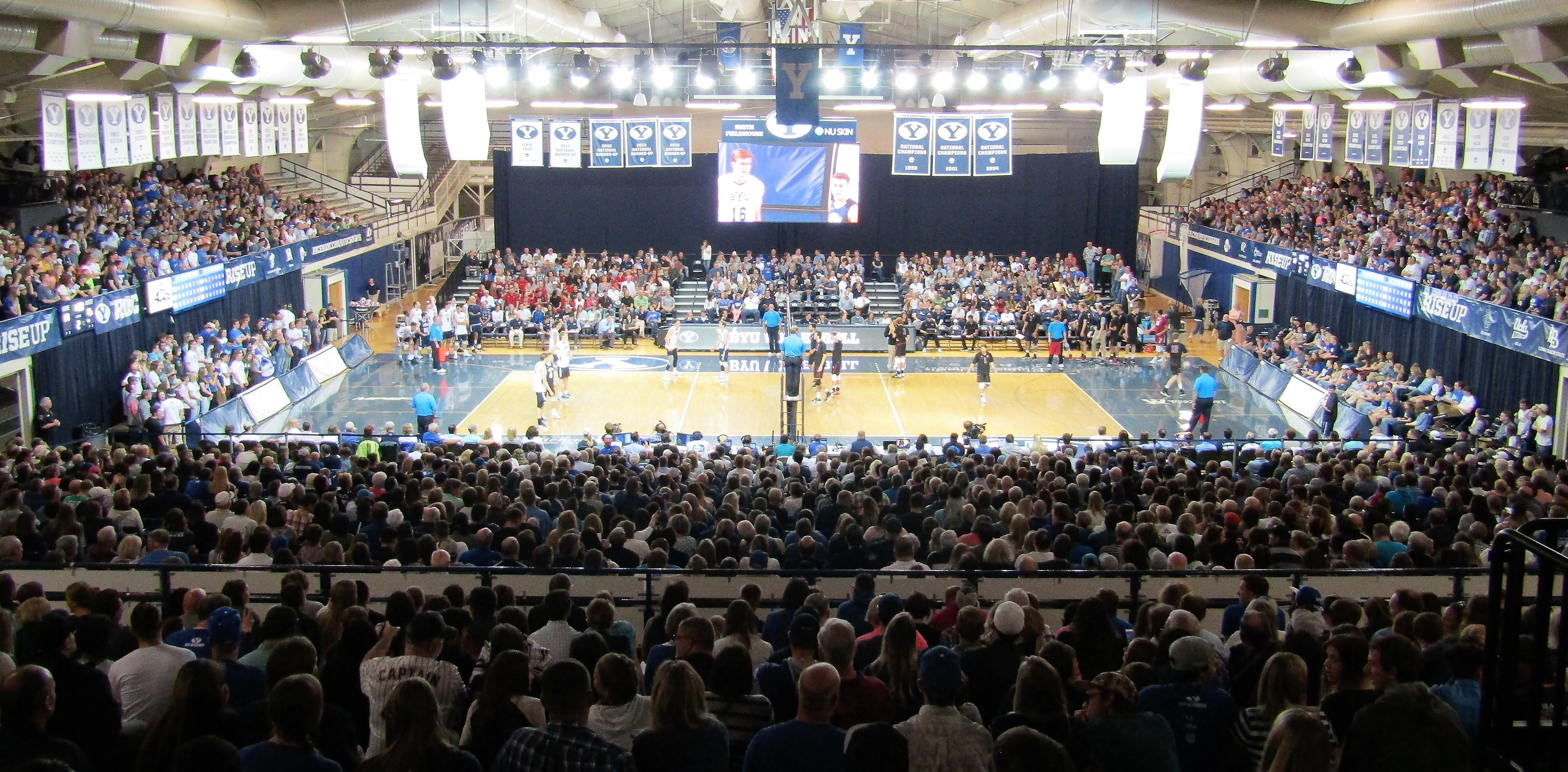
The Smith Fieldhouse during a BYU Cougars men's volleyball match in 2017

The Smith Fieldhouse was opened in 1951. It is named after named after George Albert Smith, the 8th President of the Church of Jesus Christ of Latter-day Saints, who died the year the fieldhouse opened. The building was originally constructed to provide space for the men’s basketball team and their games, which had previously been hosted in off-campus courts, but it has taken on many different uses over the years both athletic and social, including school dances, intramural sports, debates, religious services, concerts (the Tabernacle Choir, the Chicago Symphony Orchestra, and The Carpenters), and other event such as the Harlem Globetrotters. In 1958, an unidentified assailant broke into the Smith Fieldhouse and stole the Y Bell held in the facility.

The Smith Fieldhouse held the first round of the NCAA Men's Division I Basketball Championship twice, in 1960 and 1970, and the West Regionals in 1962, 1963 and 1965. It served as home to BYU's basketball teams until they shifted to the Marriott Center in 1971. While it served as home for BYU's basketball teams, it had a max capacity of 10,500 people. In 1971, the basketball teams relocated to the Marriott Center, and the Smith Fieldhouse was reorganized and subdivided to include an indoor track, offices for the athletic department, and a student wellness center.

BYU's volleyball teams began playing in the facility in 1990, followed later by the school's gymnastics team. In 2009, the facility hosted the 2009 NCAA Men's Volleyball Championship.

== See also ==
- List of Brigham Young University buildings
