= San Diego Toreros =

USD's intercollegiate sports teams

- University: University of San Diego
- NCAA: Division I (FCS)
- Conference: WCC (primary); Pioneer Football League (football); Mountain Pacific Sports Federation (women's swimming & diving)
- Athletic director: Kimya Massey
- Location: San Diego, California
- Varsity teams: 17 (18 in 2026)
- Football stadium: Torero Stadium
- Basketball arena: Jenny Craig Pavilion
- Baseball stadium: Fowler Park
- Softball stadium: Reggie Smith Softball Complex
- Volleyball arena: Jenny Craig Pavilion
- Nickname: Toreros
- Colors: Navy, white, and Toreros blue
- Mascot: Diego Torero
- Website: www.usdtoreros.com
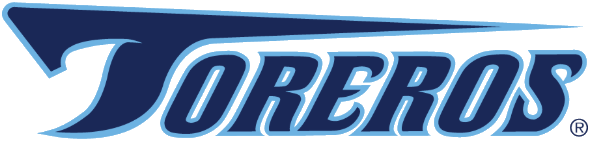

The San Diego Toreros are the intercollegiate athletic teams that represent the University of San Diego (USD). The Toreros compete in NCAA Division I (FCS) as a member of the West Coast Conference (WCC).

== Sports sponsored ==
Men's sports	Women's sports
Baseball	Basketball
Basketball	Beach volleyball (in 2026–27)
Cross country	Cross country
Football	Rowing
Golf	Soccer
Rowing	Softball
Soccer	Swimming and Diving
Tennis	Tennis
	Track and field^{1}
	Volleyball
^{1} – outdoor only

== National championships ==
=== Rugby ===
Association	Division	Sport	Year	Opponent	Score
USA Rugby	Division 1-AA/Red Division	Men's rugby	2022	Harvard	28–14
USA Rugby	Division 1-AA/ACR	Men's rugby	2023	Iowa State	41–19
USA Rugby	Division 1-AA/CRAA	Men's rugby	2024	Iowa State	38–7

=== Team ===
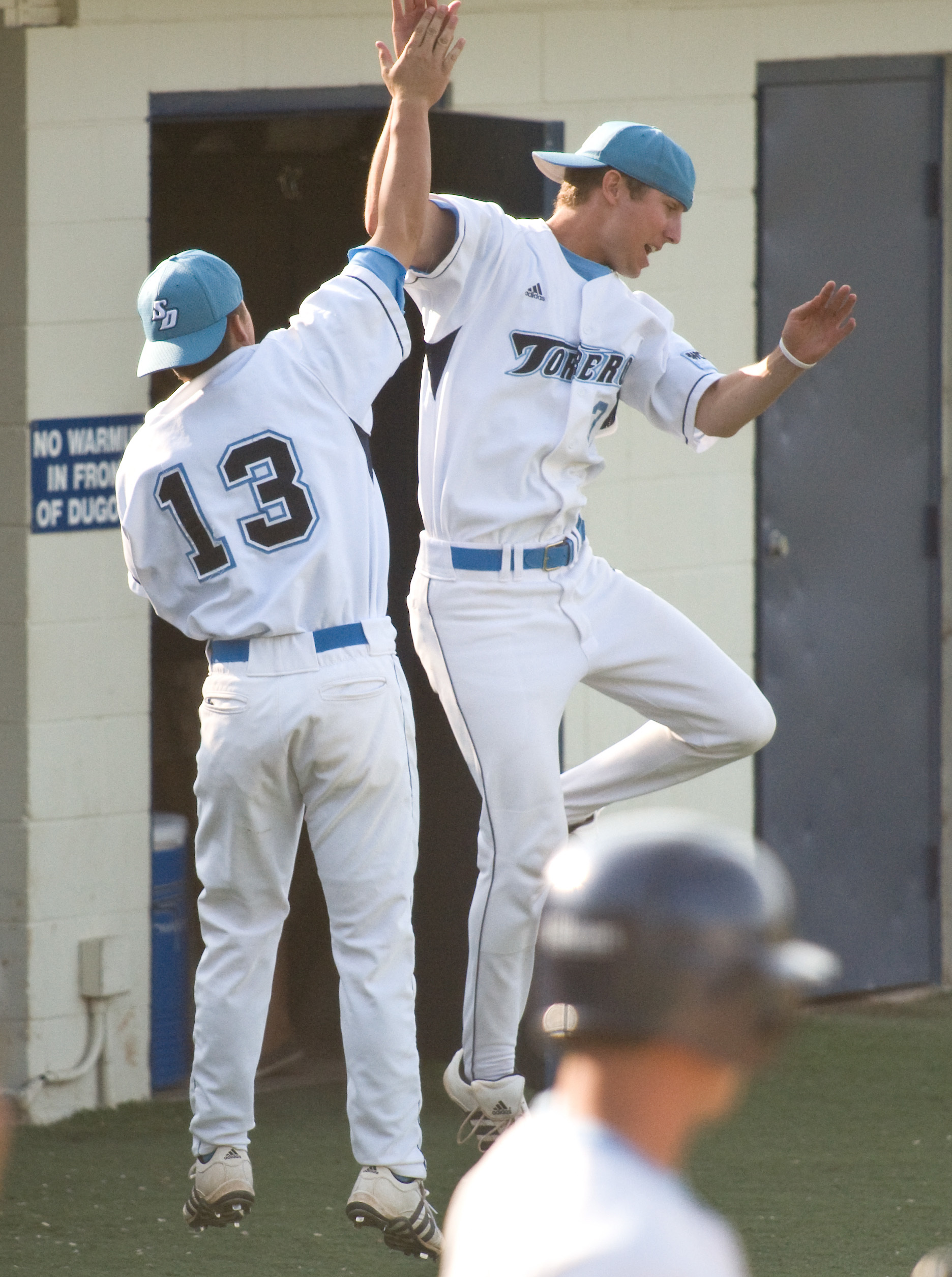
San Diego Toreros baseball players during a game

Association	Division	Sport	Year	Opponent/Runner-up	Score/Points
NCAA (2)	Division II (2)	Men's Tennis (2)	1974	UC Irvine	25–20
NCAA (2)	Division II (2)	Men's Tennis (2)	1975†	Southern Colorado State	—

- † Title shared with UC Irvine

=== Individual ===
Assoc.	Division	Sport	Year	Event	Individual(s)
NCAA (5)	Division II (4)	Men's Tennis (4)	1974	Singles	Andy Rae
NCAA (5)	Division II (4)	Men's Tennis (4)	1974	Doubles	Andy Rae & Russell Watts
NCAA (5)	Division II (4)	Men's Tennis (4)	1975	Singles	Andy Rae
NCAA (5)	Division II (4)	Men's Tennis (4)	1978	Doubles	Par Svensson & Rick Goldberg
NCAA (5)	Division I (1)	Women's Tennis (1)	1999	Singles	Zuzana Lešenarová

== Notable athletes ==
- Oliver Kane - MLR Prop San Diego Legion
- Jamal Agnew - NFL wide receiver
- Eric Bakhtiari - former NFL linebacker
- Kris Bryant - MLB outfielder/third baseman
- Josh Butler - former MLB pitcher
- Brady Clark - Former MLB outfielder
- Dylan Covey - former MLB pitcher
- Ross Dwelley - NFL tight end
- Scott Garlick - former MLS Goalkeeper
- Michael Gasperson - NFL wide receiver
- A.J. Griffin - former MLB pitcher
- Evan Hlavacek - former AFL wide receiver
- Josh Johnson - NFL quarterback
- Zuzana Lešenarová - former professional tennis player
- Matt Maslowski - former NFL wide receiver
- John Matthews - former NFL wide receiver
- Brian Matusz - former MLB pitcher
- Mike McCoy - former MLB utility player
- James Pazos - MLB pitcher
- Paul Sewald - MLB pitcher
- Sammy Solís - former MLB pitcher
- Vern Valdez - former NFL defensive back
- Stan Washington - former NBA player
- John Wathan - former MLB utility player

== Notable non-varsity teams ==
=== Rugby ===
Rival	Score
Kennesaw State	36-5
Iowa State	24-19
Harvard	15-14
Playoffs	Score
Stanford	26-24
Nebraska	17-12
Harvard	26-14

The University of San Diego Rugby Football Club was founded in 1980. USD plays college rugby in Division 1-AA in the Gold Coast Conference. They are coached by Charlie Purdon.

In the 2021–22 season, USD finished 4–0 in conference play and qualified for the D1-AA national playoffs in both 15s and 7s, where they lost to Fresno State 46-7 (who later won the 15s National Championship) and defeated Sacramento State 53–17. The Toreros then regrouped and poised themselves to take a shot at the National Title in 7s later that year in Atlanta, Georgia. The Toreros went 6–0 in the tournament, defeating Kennesaw State, Iowa State, Harvard, Stanford, Nebraska, and finally Harvard once again to claim the First National Championship in the club's 42-year history:
