= Andrew Williams =

Andrew or Andy Williams may refer to:

== Arts and entertainment ==
- Andy Williams (1927–2012), American singer
  - Andy Williams (album), eponymous 1958 compilation album
- Andrew Williams (novelist) (born 1962), British novelist
- Andy Williams (drummer) (born 1970), English musician, member of the band Doves
- Andy Williams (guitarist) (1977–2026), American guitarist and professional wrestler
- Andy Williams (fl. 1990s), British musician, member of the dance band K-Klass
- Andy Williams (The X Factor) (fl. 2007), contestant in series 4 of The X Factor UK
- Andy Williams (visual effects), visual effects supervisor
- Andrew Williams (actor) (born 1962/1963), Welsh-Australian actor and musician

== Politics and law ==
- Andrew Williams (American politician) (1828–1907), U.S. representative from New York
- Andrew Williams (New Zealand politician) (born 1959), New Zealand politician, mayor of North Shore City

== Sports ==
=== Association football (soccer) ===
- Andy Williams (footballer, born 1962), English footballer born in Birmingham
- Andy Williams (Jamaican footballer) (born September 1977), Canadian-born Jamaican football (soccer) player
- Andy Williams (Welsh footballer) (born October 1977), English-born Wales international footballer
- Andy Williams (footballer, born 1986), English footballer born in Hereford

=== Other sports ===
- String Bean Williams (Andrew Williams, 1873–1929), American baseball player
- Andrew Williams (Shropshire cricketer) (born 1965), Welsh cricketer
- Andrew Williams (Cumberland cricketer) (born 1970), English cricketer
- Andrew Williams (Australian footballer) (born 1979), Australian rules footballer
- Andrew Williams (American football) (born 1979), American NFL football player for the San Francisco 49ers
- Andy Williams (rugby union) (born 1981), Welsh international rugby union player
- Andy Williams (American football) (fl. 1990s), American football coach for Washburn University in Topeka, Kansas

== Others ==
- Andy Williams (surgeon) (born 1964), British surgeon
- Andrew Williams (bishop), British-born American Anglican bishop
- Andy Williams (born 1986), American perpetrator of the Santana High School shooting
- Andrew B. Williams, American academic in the field of engineering
