= List of Marquette University buildings =

The following is a partial list of the buildings on the campus of Marquette University located in Milwaukee, Wisconsin, United States.

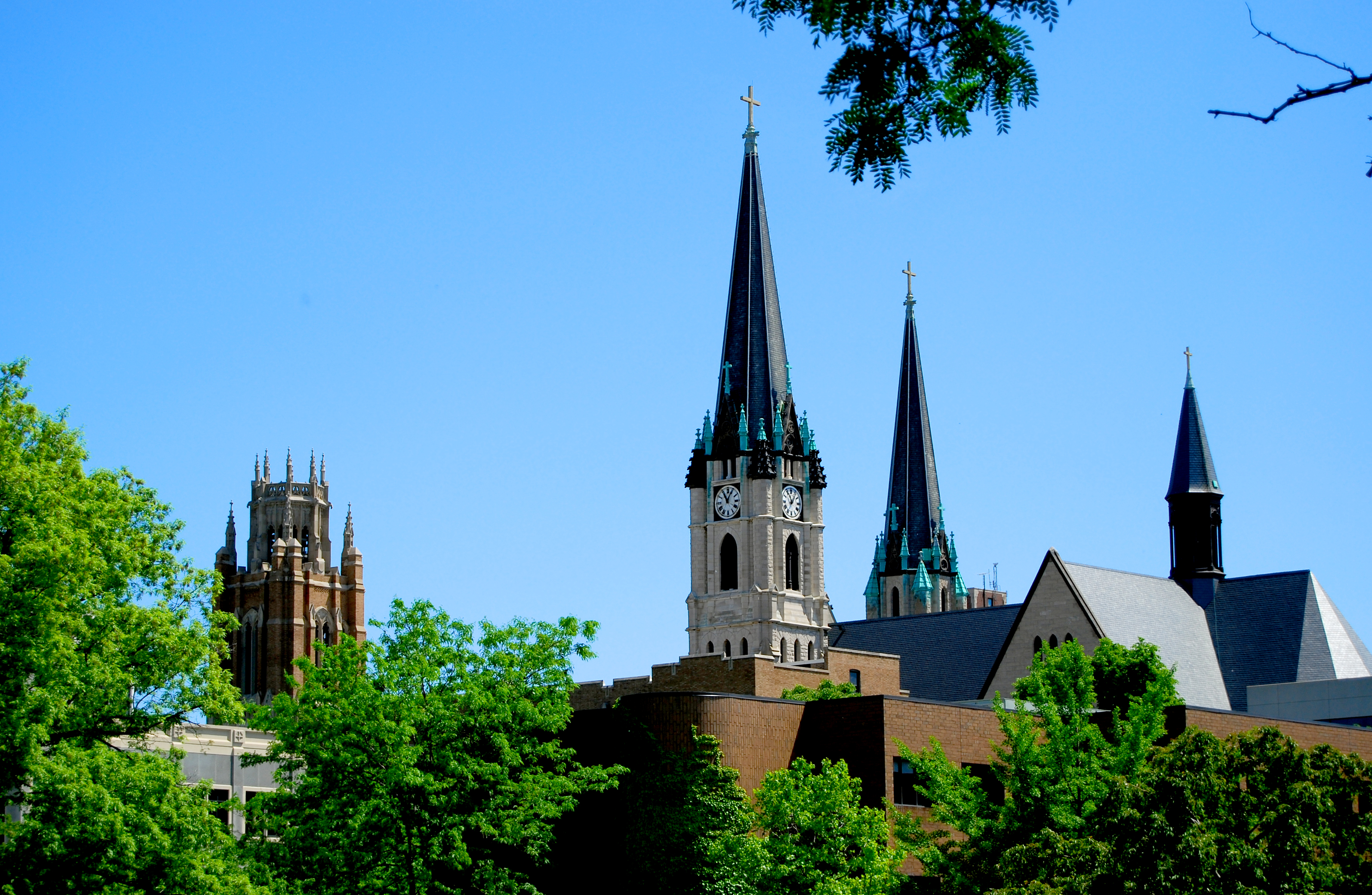
Marquette University spirescape

== Academic buildings ==
- The 1700 Building, the university's northwesternmost building, houses classroom and office space for Marquette's physician assistant graduate program.
- Eckstein Hall, completed in 2010, is the new home of Marquette's law school. In addition to classrooms and faculty offices, the law school has a four-story "library without borders," two mock court rooms, a cafeteria, a workout facility, a conference center, and a small parking structure.
- Engineering Hall, first opened in 2011, houses classrooms, labs, and faculty offices for the College of Engineering. The building has a Silver LEED certification, due in part to a green roof with solar panels and primarily LED lighting.
- Haggerty Hall, First built in 1941, Haggerty Hall features a first-floor study area, the Engineering Student Success Center, remodeled classrooms, modern materials labs, computer labs and several other teaching and research facilities. The lower level features a Deburring and Surface Finishing Research Lab and an Internal Combustion Engines Laboratory. The first floor is home to the Engineering Student Success Center, Advanced Systems and Assembly Manufacturing Lab, and the Medical Imaging Lab. The second floor is mainly administrators offices. The third floor has the Electric Machines and Drives Lab. The fourth floor has a Biohazard level II lab, Hydraulics Lab, Waves and Signals Lab, Marquette Embedded Systems lab, and the Computational Vision and Sensing Systems Lab.
- Olin Engineering Center, Connected to Haggerty Hall, the Olin Engineering Center is a four-level facility with engineering labs and offices. The third floor houses the Orthopaedic and Rehabilitation Engineering Center. The fifth floor has the GasDay Lab.
- Johnston Hall houses the Diederich College of Communication. Built at the turn of the 20th century, the fledgling Marquette College almost went bankrupt to build this until Robert A. Johnston, a local confectioner, donated just over $100,000 to save the project. For a short while, Johnston Hall housed the entire College, including the Jesuit faculty. The now ivy-covered building once featured an observatory for astronomy students. Student Media is located in Johnston Hall.

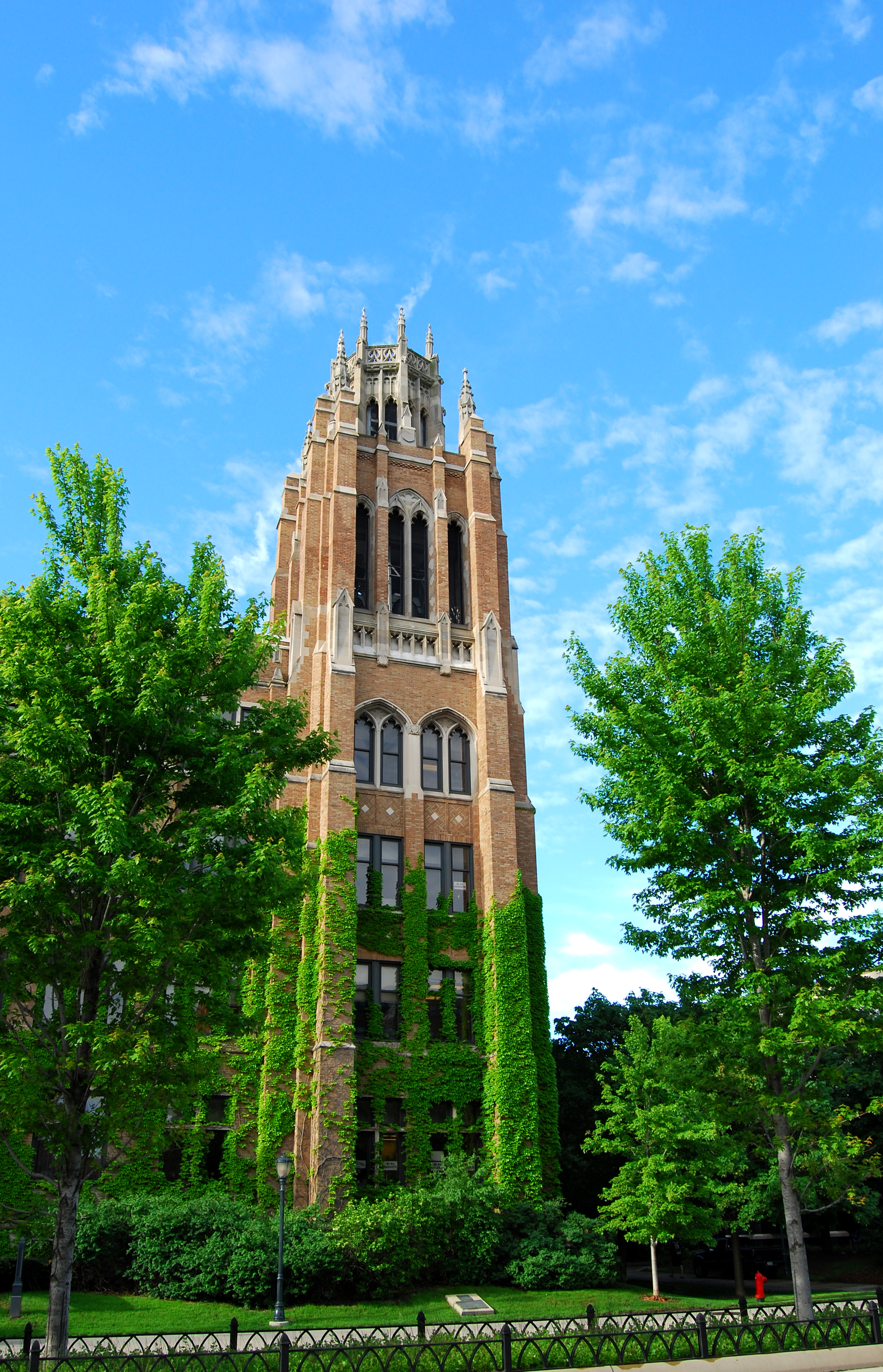
Marquette Hall

- Marquette Hall, built in 1924, is the four-story building that originally served as Marquette's Science Building with offices, classrooms and labs. In 1976, it was renamed Marquette Hall in honor of the university's namesake. One of the most widely recognized buildings on campus, Marquette Hall was the home to several offices, including Undergraduate Admissions until they moved to their new location in the newly completed Zilber Hall. The four-story building contains three lecture halls with 300 seats each. In the tower of Marquette Hall is the university carillon, a set of 48 bells that are played every Wednesday and for special events.
- The Marquette School of Dentistry building houses Wisconsin's only dental school. Completed in 2002, the building holds pre-clinical labs, classrooms, and a community dental clinic.
- The John P. Raynor, S.J. Library, completed in 2003, is named for one of Marquette's former presidents. The library contains many of J. R. R. Tolkien's original manuscripts, and serves as one of the main study areas on campus.
  - See also Marquette University Special Collections and University Archives
- Sensenbrenner Hall previously housed the law school. One of the oldest buildings on campus, it is known for its stained-glass windows and traditional design, especially in the Howard B. Eisenberg Memorial Hall. Marquette's law library, which featured contrasting modern architecture, was located next to Sensenbrenner Hall. In 2010, the Law School moved into Eckstein Hall. Today, this building is home to office space for the Helen Way Klingler College of Arts and Sciences.

== Administrative buildings ==
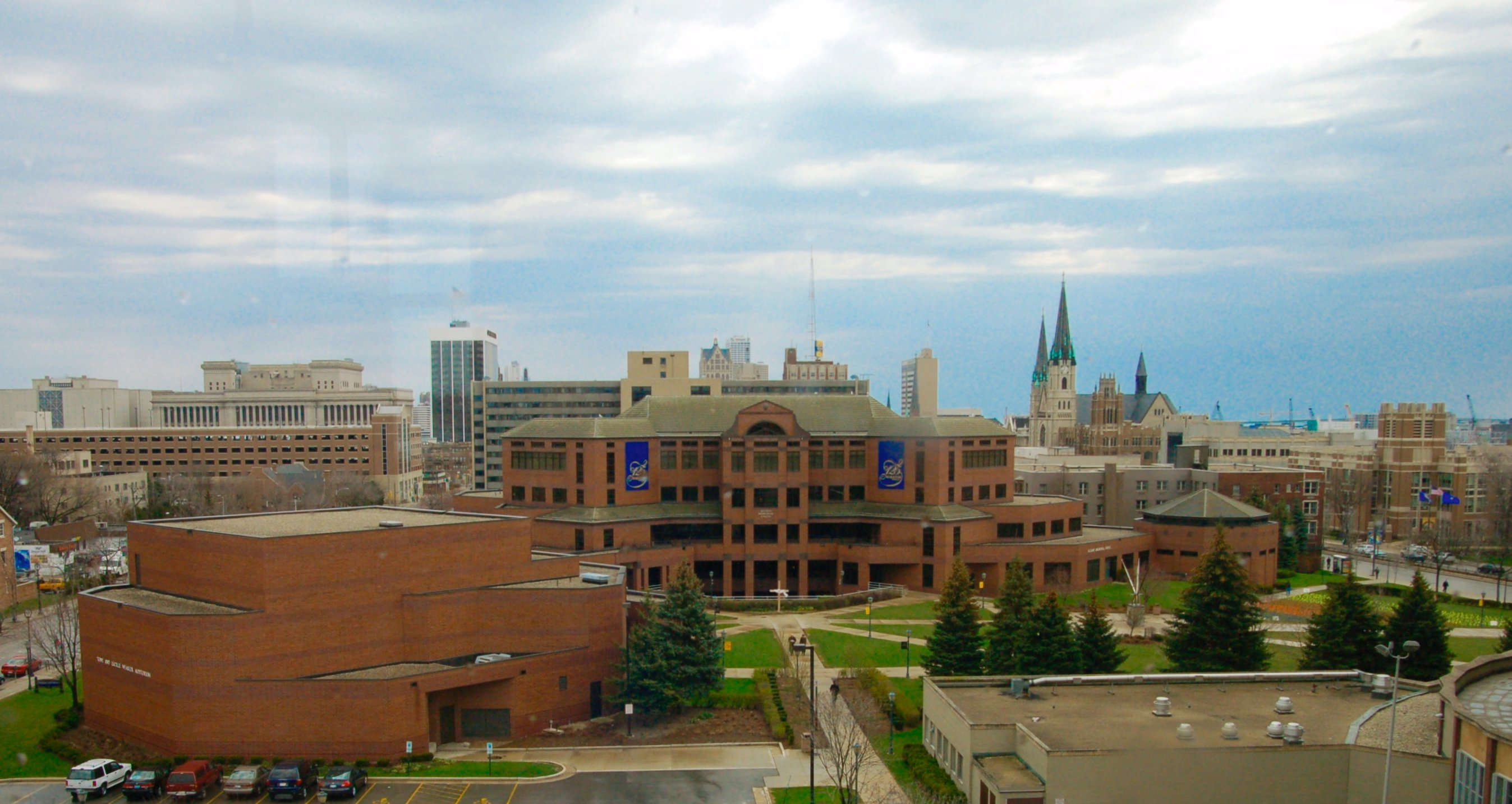
The Alumni Memorial Union

- The 707 Building is an administrative building that houses the Marquette University College of Professional Studies offices as well as the university's service-learning and ROTC offices.
- Alumni Memorial Union (AMU, for short), the student union, is at the center of campus. The five-story brick building, completed in 1990, contains a ballroom for 800 guests, offices for student organizations, a coffee shop called "Brew Bayou", the university's information center, a post office, a branch US Bank, a game room, a cafeteria, and the campus gift shop. An adjacent auditorium is connected to the AMU by a covered promenade. Also part of the AMU is the Chapel of the Holy Family, which holds a student Mass each Sunday night.
- Zilber Hall is a student services building. Completed in late fall 2009, Zilber Hall houses the Office of Student Financial Aid, the Office of the Bursar, the Office of the Registrar, and the Office of Admissions.

== Athletic facilities ==
- The Al McGuire Center, named for the legendary Marquette basketball coach, was opened in 2004 and is home to the women's volleyball and basketball teams and serves as the practice facility and administrative offices for the men's basketball team.
- Valley Fields, used for men's and women's soccer, men's and women's track and field, and club athletics, is located across the Menomonee River in the Menomonee Valley, just south of the main campus. It is currently undergoing a renovation to add covered bleachers and other facility improvements.

== Other facilities ==
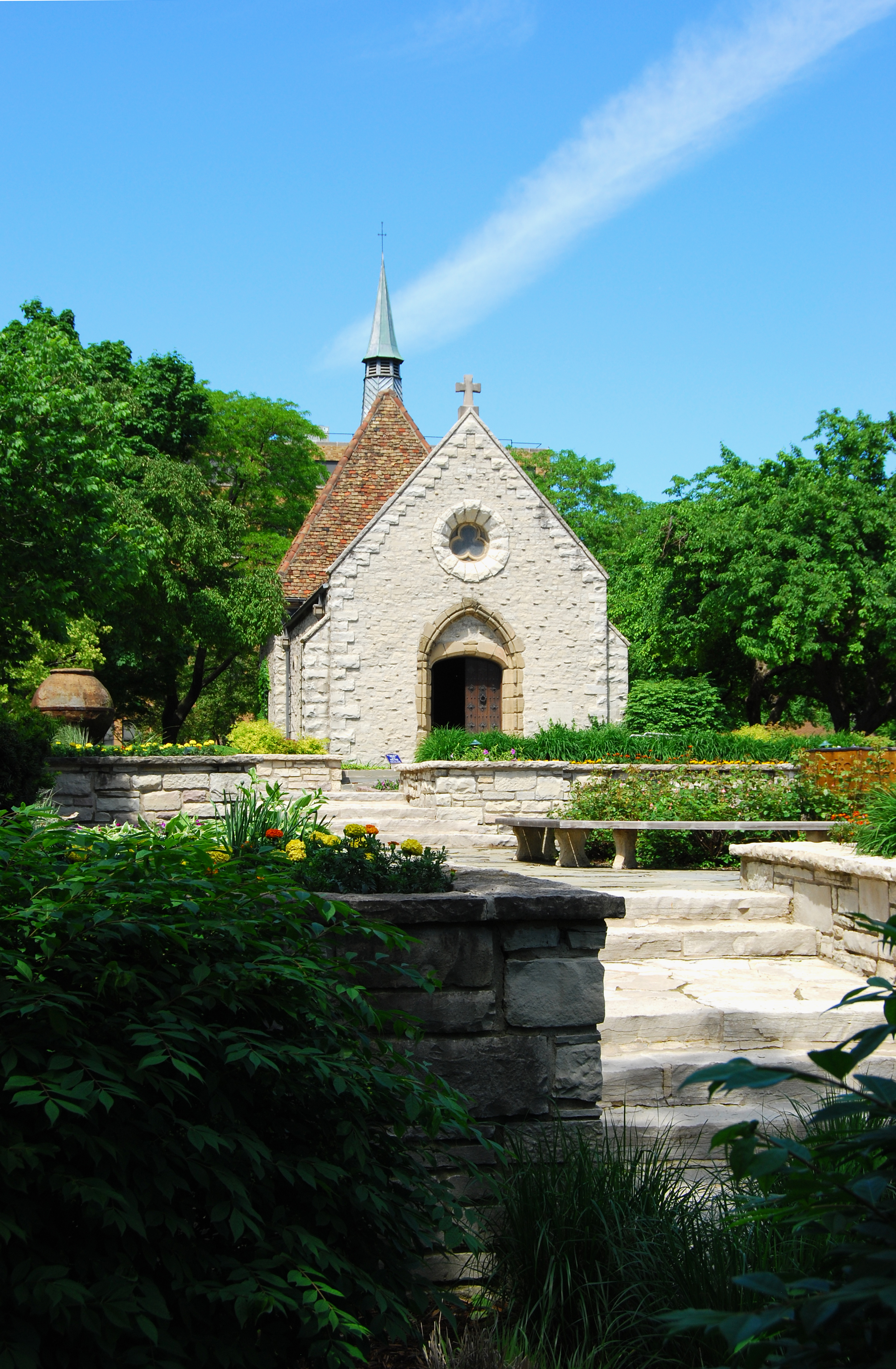
St. Joan of Arc Chapel

- Gesu Church, completed in 1894, is considered the spiritual center of the campus, but is not affiliated with the university. The Jesuit parish was designed by architect Henry C. Koch in the Gothic art style. Student-organized Masses are held each Sunday in Gesu Church, along with the annual Mass of the Holy Spirit, a traditional celebration at many Jesuit education institutions to begin the school year. In 1994, the Provincial of the Wisconsin Province of the Society of Jesus decided to separately incorporate Gesu as an Archdiocesan Parish, sponsored by the Society of Jesus.
- The Patrick and Beatrice Haggerty Museum of Art features more than 8,000 works from the old masters to contemporary art works from such artists as Salvador Dalí, Marc Chagall, Keith Haring and Roberto Matta.
- The St. Joan of Arc Chapel is the only medieval chapel in the Western Hemisphere. Originally built in France in the 15th century, the chapel was donated to the university by Mr. and Mrs. Marc Rojtman in 1964. The building was relocated to the U.S., first to New York, then to Milwaukee, where it was reconstructed piece by piece in 1966. Today, the St. Joan of Arc Chapel hosts daily weekday masses.
- The Union Sports Annex is a restaurant and meeting space for students, especially during men's basketball season. "The Annex" is almost entirely underground and includes a restaurant, bar, sports court, and bowling lanes. In 2003, ESPN columnist Jim Caple called the Union Sports Annex the "best place to watch a game."
