= College of Professional Studies =

College of Professional Studies may refer to:

- Goodwin College of Professional Studies, at Drexel University in Philadelphia, Pennsylvania, U.S.
- Marquette University College of Professional Studies, at Marquette University in Milwaukee, Wisconsin, U.S.
- San Diego State University College of Professional Studies & Fine Arts, at San Diego State University in San Diego, California, U.S.
- Syracuse University College of Professional Studies, at Syracuse University in Syracuse, New York, U.S.
- UNH College of Professional Studies (formerly Granite State College), part of the University of New Hampshire at Manchester in Manchester, New Hampshire, U.S.

== See also ==
- Master of Professional Studies, a type of master's degree
- School of Professional Studies (disambiguation)
- University of Professional Studies, Accra, Ghana
