= Marquette University Humanoid Engineering & Intelligent Robotics Lab =

Robotics research laboratory

Coordinates: 43°2′18.34″N 87°56′1.53″W

The Marquette University Humanoid Engineering & Intelligent Robotics (HEIR) Lab was a robotics lab in Marquette University's College of Engineering.

== History ==
The lab was started in Engineering Hall in 2012. It was directed by Professor Andrew Williams. The lab receives funding to design and program robots to do things like function as exercise coaches and teach STEM concepts.

Members of the lab have worked on numerous publications that have been presented at various conferences around the world. They used Nao humanoid robots for some projects.

A robot called MU-L8 was designed and built by the lab. Many of the parts were 3D printed.

In 2014, the lab participated in the RoboCup 2014 competition.

== In the News ==
MU-L8, a robot designed and built by the lab, was featured on the cover of Milwaukee Magazine's November 2013 issue.

Members of the lab were interviewed by FOX 6 News Milwaukee on the building of a robot to compete at RoboCup.

The Milwaukee Journal Sentinel published an article on the lab's trip to the 2014 RoboCup competition in Brazil.

In 2016, a team representing the lab traveled to Washington, D.C. for an event hosted by the Congressional Robotics Caucus.
