= Frank Wade =

Frank Wade may refer to:

- Frank Wade (cricketer) (1871–1940), Australian cricketer
- Frank E. Wade (1873–1930), American lawyer football player and coach
- Frank E. Wade (prison commissioner) (1865–1929), American lawyer and New York Superintendent of State Prisons

== See also ==
- Francis Wade (1909–1987), American Jesuit and professor of philosophy
