= Undergraduate real estate programs in the United States =

The study of real estate at the undergraduate level is commonly contained as a degree of Bachelor of Science in Real Estate or a Bachelor of Business Administration with a concentration in real estate. A very limited number of universities offer a full "Bachelor of Science in Real Estate" and have "Real Estate" departments in their respective Colleges within the University. With the maturity of Master of Real Estate Development programs, universities are now looking at also offering specialized undergraduate education in real estate.

Many of the programs ranked by U.S. News & World Report are Bachelor of Business Administration or Bachelor of Science programs though some, such as University of Florida, Cornell University, and University of Illinois, only offer minors in Real Estate or majors in Finance "with emphasis in Real Estate". While business schools continue to attract future real estate professionals, many critics of business education have many complaints. Some say the schools have become too scientific, too detached from real-world issues. Others say students are taught to come up with hasty solutions to complicated problems. Another group contends that schools give students a limited and distorted view of their role - that they graduate with a focus on maximizing shareholder value and only a limited understanding of ethical and social considerations essential to business leadership. Such shortcomings may have left business school graduates inadequately prepared to make the decisions that, taken together, might have helped mitigate the financial and real estate crisis, critics say. An alternative course of study to an undergraduate degree in business or real estate is the liberal arts, such as economics, public administration, urban planning, or geography. An aspiring real estate professional may supplement his education with a Master of Real Estate Development degree, a common prerequisite for many institutional and corporate real estate firms.

== Business school rankings ==
The U.S. News & World Report ranks the top 13 undergraduate programs which offer a study in real estate. However, many schools on the U.S. News & World Report list (University of Florida and Cornell University, for example) do not actually offer undergraduate degrees (majors) in Real Estate, and alternatively run a "focus" or "minor" in Real Estate under their Finance departments. Additionally there are many non-business schools that offer other real estate related degrees. The International Council of Shopping Centers provides an alternative list of active "Real Estate" institutions:

2015 US&WR ranked undergraduate programs
Ranking	University	Business school	Curriculum
1	University of Pennsylvania (Note: Private institution)	Wharton School	Concentration
2	University of Wisconsin–Madison	Wisconsin School of Business	Major
3	University of Georgia	Terry College of Business	Major
4	University of California, Berkeley	Haas School of Business	Concentration
5	University of Southern California	Marshall School of Business	Major/Minor
6	New York University	New York University School of Professional Studies	Major
7	University of Florida	Warrington College of Business Administration	Minor
8	University of Texas at Austin	McCombs School of Business	Certificate
9	Marquette University	Marquette University College of Business Administration	Major
10	Florida State University	College of Business	Major
10	University of Illinois at Urbana–Champaign	College of Business	Specialization
12	Cornell University	Cornell University School of Hotel Administration	Minor

== See also ==
- Graduate real estate education
