= John Patrick Raynor =

John Patrick Raynor, S.J.

20th President of Marquette University
- In office 1965–1990
- Preceded by: William F. Kelley, S.J.
- Succeeded by: Albert J. DiUlio, S.J.

Personal details
- Born: 1 October 1923 Omaha, Nebraska, US
- Died: 14 November 1997 (aged 74)
- Education: St. Louis University; University of Chicago
- Profession: Jesuit priest, academic

John Patrick Raynor (1 October 1923 – 14 November 1997) was a Catholic priest of the Jesuit order and the twentieth president of Marquette University in Milwaukee, Wisconsin. Raynor managed Marquette University from 1965 to 1990, which is the longest tenure of any president in Marquette's history. During Raynor's tenure, the university added several graduate and professional programs, including doctoral programs in biology, chemistry, English, history, mathematics and engineering.

== Early life and education ==
Father Raynor was born in Omaha, Nebraska, in 1923, one of ten children of Walter and Mary Clare Raynor. He attended Creighton Preparatory High School and then graduated from St. Louis University, earning both a bachelor's and master's degree in Greek and Latin in 1947 and 1948, respectively. He joined the Jesuit order in 1941. From 1948 to 1951, Raynor taught and served as vice principal at St. Louis University High School. Raynor was ordained as a priest in 1954. Five years later, he received a Doctorate in higher education from the University of Chicago.

== Career at Marquette ==
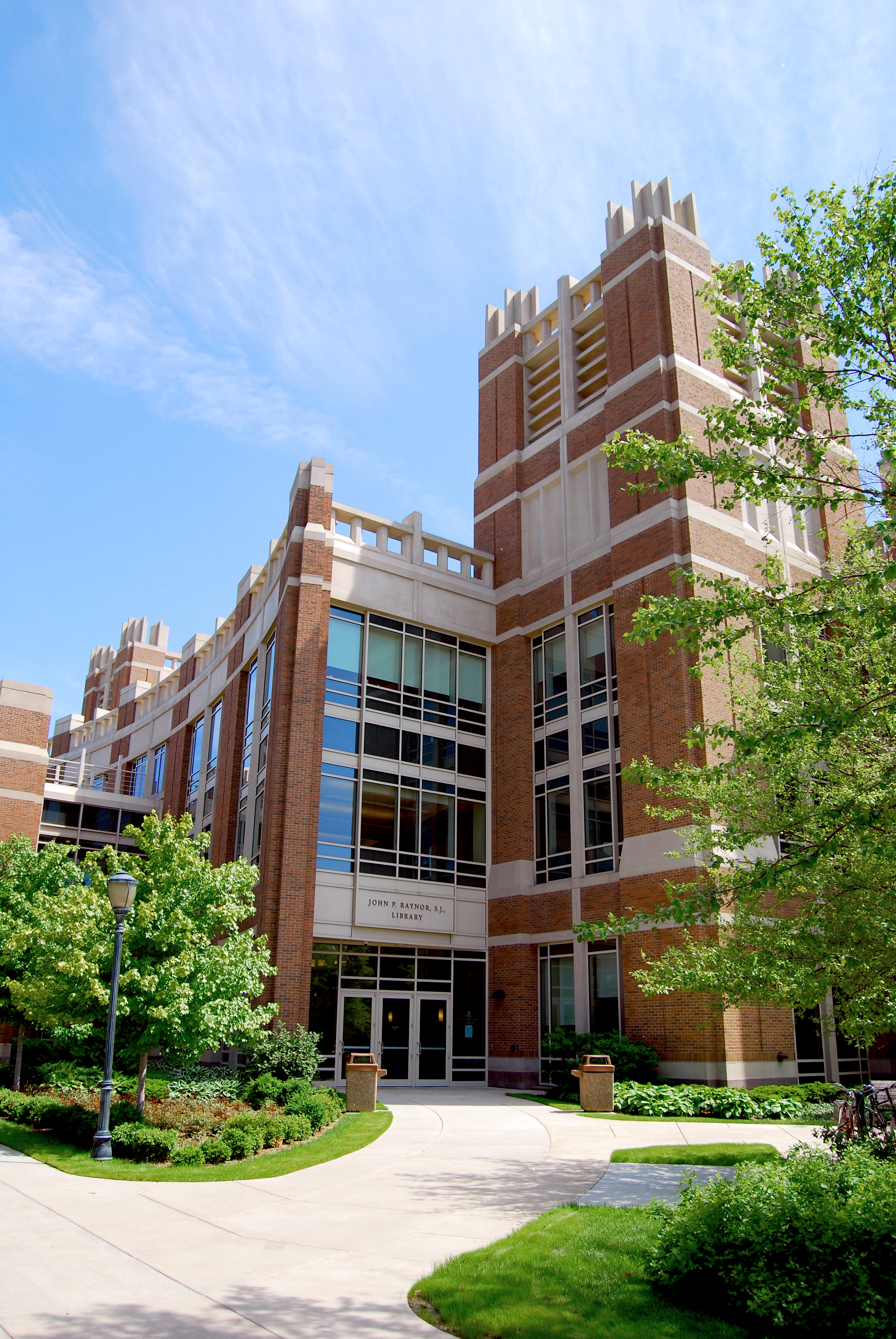
The John P. Raynor, S.J., Library on the campus of Marquette University

Father Raynor joined Marquette's faculty in 1960 to serve as assistant dean of the university's College of Liberal Arts (now the Helen Way Klingler College of Arts and Sciences). He moved to the position of academic vice president in 1962, at which time he became Marquette's twentieth president. He also taught at the university's School of Education.

Among Raynor's many accomplishments during his time as president were the awarding of a Phi Beta Kappa chapter, the increase in lay people on the faculty and in the administration, an expansion of the university's board of trustees from three Jesuits to a group of 29 individuals, both clergy and non-clergy. The campus also nearly tripled in size from 26 to 80 acres during his presidency. Near the end of Raynor's tenure, the Campaign for Marquette (1985–1990) fund drive raised more than $130 million for the school. Additionally, the men's basketball team, under Coach Al McGuire, won the 1970 National Invitational Tournament and the 1977 NCAA Championship.

Raynor retired as president in 1990, and became university chancellor a year later, assisting his successor and participating in university fundraising.

== Awards and recognition ==
Raynor's received several honors, particularly during his time as Marquette's president. These included the Vocational Recognition Award of the Rotary Club of Milwaukee, the Milwaukee Press Club's Headliner of the Year Award, the Human Relations Award of the Wisconsin Region of the National Conference of Christians and Jews, the Distinguished Service Award of the Education Commission of the States, and the Pope John XXIII Award from Viterbo College. He belonged to the Phi Beta Kappa honor society and received honorary degrees from Marquette, St. Louis University, Cardinal Stritch University and St. Norbert College.

Marquette also honored Raynor by establishing an endowed faculty chair and the university's library in his name.

== Death ==
After his third major heart surgery and a battle with cancer, Raynor died on 14 November 1997.
