= Jeffrey A. Joerres =

American chief executive

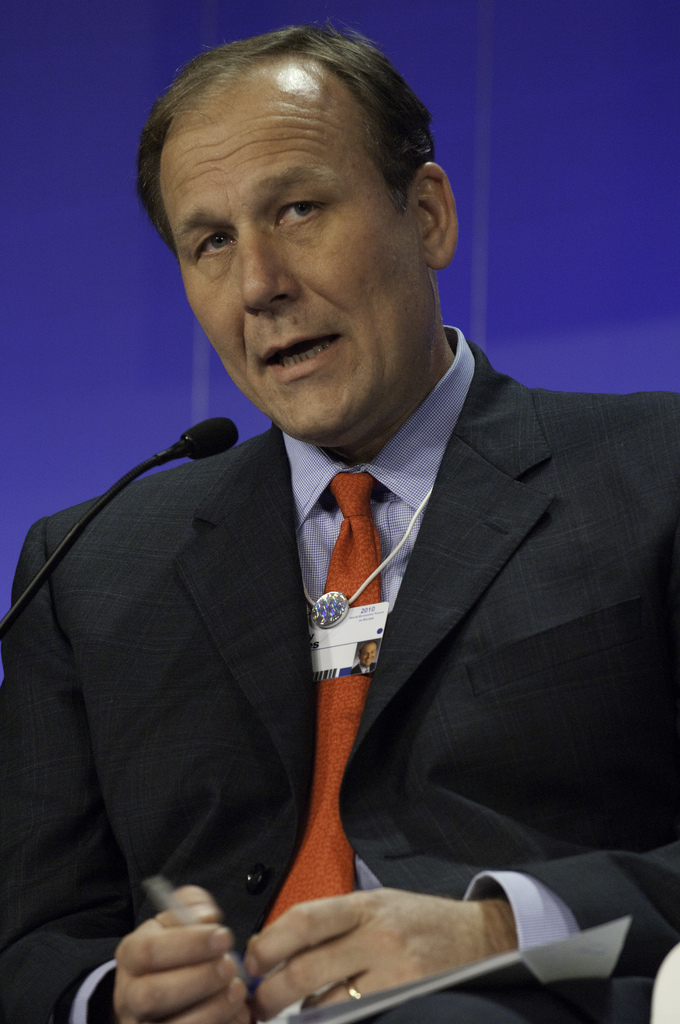
Joerres at the World Economic Forum in Brussels

Jeffrey A. Joerres served as ManpowerGroup Executive Chairman from 2014 to 2015, after 15 years as chief executive officer. Having joined the organization in 1993, Joerres served as Vice President of Marketing and Senior Vice President of European Operations and Global Account Management. In 1999, he was named CEO, and in 2001, chairman of the board.

His contributions to Manpower led to his recognition in the Institutional Investor magazine which included his name in the list of the Best CEOs in America for the fourth consecutive year. He has a bachelor's degree from the Marquette University College of Business Administration.
