= Rajendra Rathore =

Rajendra Rathore may refer to:

- Rajendra Singh Rathore, Indian politician
- Rajendra Rathore (chemist) (1961–2018), organic chemist
