= Helen Way Klingler College of Arts and Sciences =

American college

Coordinates: 43.038356°N 87.927851°W

- Type: Private
- Established: 1881
- Affiliations: Catholic, Jesuit
- Dean: Richard C. Holz, Ph.D.
- Academic staff: 250
- Location: Milwaukee, WI, United States
- Campus: Urban
- Website: www.marquette.edu/arts-sciences/

The Helen Way Klingler College of Arts and Sciences is one of the primary colleges at Marquette University, located in Milwaukee, Wisconsin. The college oversees liberal arts programs and offer both undergraduate- and graduate-level courses and degrees. It is the largest of Marquette's 11 colleges by enrollment, with over 2,700 students.

== History ==
Marquette University began as a small liberal arts college in Milwaukee in 1881. Because Marquette's first departments were in the liberal arts, the College of Arts and Sciences was founded with the establishment of the university itself. The college's first graduating class received their degrees in 1887, and at one point, the college was housed in Johnston Hall, which is listed on the National Register of Historic Places and now houses the university's Diederich College of Communication. Today, the college has its main offices in Sensenbrenner Hall, but its various departments reside in different facilities across campus.

In 2004, the college was posthumously named for Helen Way Klingler, a resident of nearby Shorewood, Wisconsin, who had anonymously donated over $33 million to the university during her lifetime. Klingler had no formal connection to the university, though she became close friends with its former president, John Patrick Raynor, who presided over her conversion to Roman Catholicism in 1993. The ceremony was held at Marquette's St. Joan of Arc Chapel.

== Academics ==
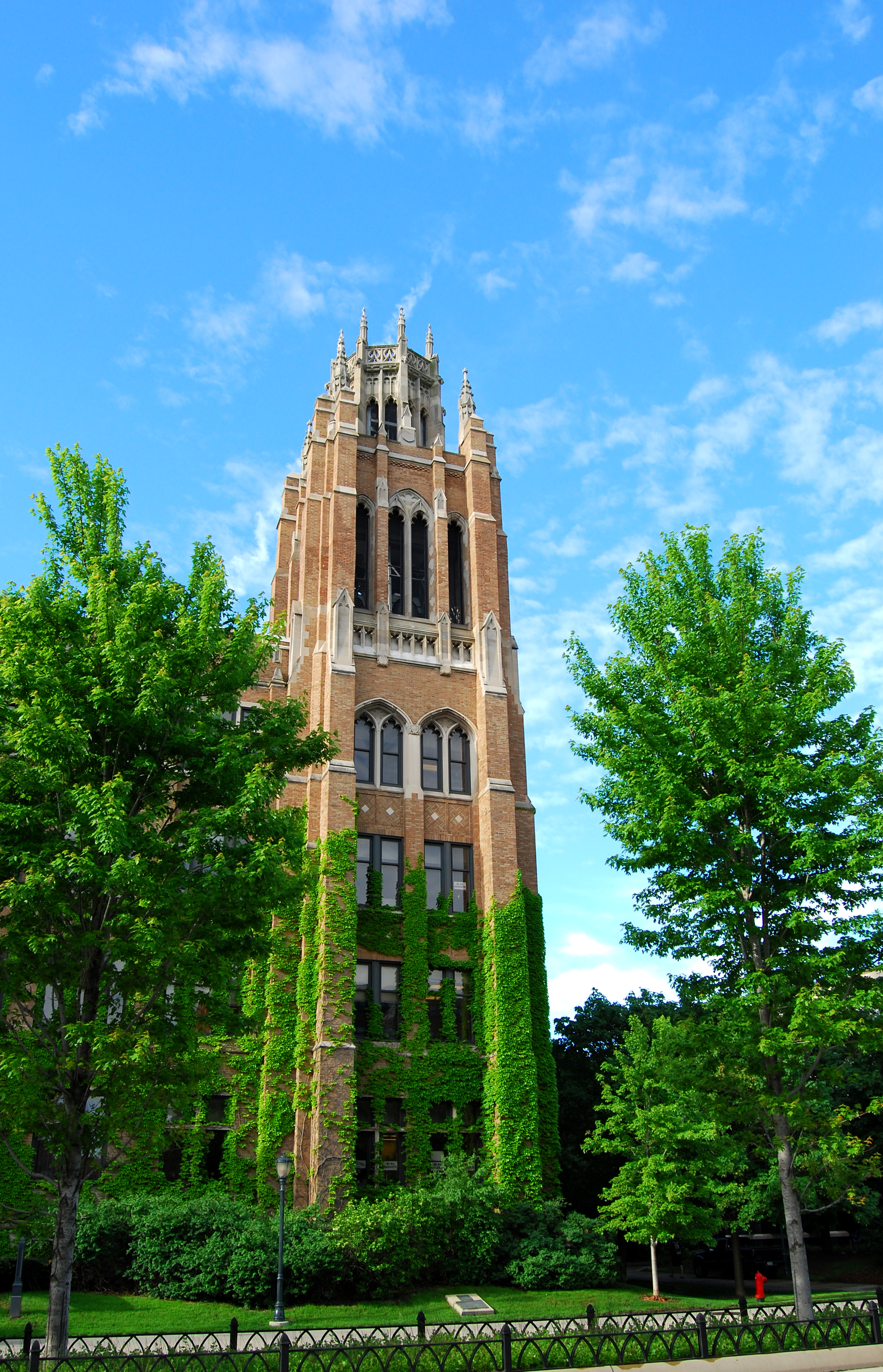
Marquette Hall houses the college's Departments of English, Philosophy, and Theology

There are over 40 majors taught by the college's 13 separate departments, primarily in liberal arts-related fields like the natural sciences, social and cultural sciences, philosophy, theology, and languages. The college also houses Marquette's Army, Navy, and Air Force ROTC programs.

=== Special programs ===
The college also oversees the Les Aspin Center for Government program, which is an educational program and extension of the university based in the Capitol Hill neighborhood of Washington, D.C. The program offers students who are interested in public policy a chance to work and study in the United States capital or study abroad in developing countries like Kenya and Tanzania through its Africa Program. It also pairs undergraduates with internships at federal agencies and in the offices of members of the U.S. Congress.

=== Accreditation ===
Marquette University as a whole is accredited by the North Central Association of Colleges and Secondary Schools, and the College of Arts and Sciences in particular has multiple accreditation and licensing bodies for its various programs. The psychology program is accredited by the American Psychological Association and the American Chemical Society has licensed Marquette's bachelor of science degrees in chemistry, molecular biology, biochemistry, and Chemistry for the Professions.

=== Rankings ===
For 2018, U.S. News & World Report ranked several of the college's graduate degree programs. The chemistry program at Marquette was ranked as 145th overall and biological sciences 213th. Ranked in 2017, as part of the Best Social Sciences and Humanities Schools list, from U.S. News & World Report, English was ranked 85th and history was 114th. In 2016, Clinical psychology at Marquette was ranked 102nd as part of the Best Health Schools list from U.S. News & World Report.
