= Marquette University Radio =

College radio station at Marquette University

Coordinates: 43°02′18.2″N 87°55′36.2″W

Marquette Radio
- Milwaukee, Wisconsin; United States

Programming
- Format: College

Ownership
- Owner: Marquette University

History
- Former call signs: WMUR

Links
- Website: Marquette Wire

Marquette University Radio (MUR) is the student-run College radio station for Marquette University in Milwaukee, Wisconsin, United States.

== About ==
Marquette Radio broadcasts on campus via Cable radio channel 96 and to the world through the live stream online. Marquette Radio is open to all current Marquette University students and offers diverse programming including talk, sports, news and music intensive shows. Students from all fields are invited to practice their skills in production, announcing, public relations, advertising sales, and record company relations.

Beginning October 1, 2013, the station released a new logo and officially dropped the call letters WMUR to distance itself from terrestrial broadcasting. Since 2013, Marquette Radio has been part of Marquette Student Media, known online as the "Marquette Wire."
