= Kazuo Nakamoto =

American chemist

- 中本 一男
- Born: March 1, 1922; Kōbe, Hyōgo, Empire of Japan
- Died: June 7, 2011 (aged 89); United States
- Education: Osaka University
- Known for: Nakamoto diagram
- Scientific career
- Fields: Infrared and Raman Spectroscopy
- Workplaces: Clark University; Illinois Institute of Technology; Marquette University

Kazuo Nakamoto (Japanese: 中本 一男, 1 March 1922 - 7 June 2011) was a Japan-born American chemist and Professor Emeritus of Chemistry at Marquette University. He specialized in infrared and Raman spectroscopy.

== Early life and career ==
Born in Kōbe, Hyōgo Prefecture, he graduated from Osaka Imperial University and joined the university as a research assistant in 1945. He was promoted to a research associate in 1946, then lecturer in 1951.

In 1953, he earned his DSc from Osaka University, after which he continued to serve as a lecturer at the university for a further four years, spending the final two years as a Fulbright Scholar in the laboratory of Robert E. Rundle at Iowa State University.

He was promoted to assistant professor at Osaka University in 1957. However, he moved to a research fellowship position at Clark University the same year, becoming an assistant professor there in 1958.

In 1961, he moved to the Illinois Institute of Technology as an associate professor, becoming a full professor in 1967. He then transferred to Marquette University in 1969 and became the first Wehr Distinguished Professor of Chemistry. From 1965 to 1973, he also served as a consultant at Argonne National Laboratory. He retired from the university in 1991. He passed away in 2011.

== Research ==
He pioneered the use of infrared and Raman spectroscopy, as well as X-ray diffraction, to elucidate the relationship between bonding patterns and vibrational frequencies in metal complexes and clathrate hydrates. His influential spectroscopy textbooks, Infrared and Raman Spectra of Inorganic and Coordination Compounds, systematically contain correlation diagrams of frequency shifts in metal-ligand bonds and hydrogen bonds, now known as Nakamoto diagrams.

He then turned his attention to biological problems and conducted extensive research on heme-related compounds.

== Awards ==
He received an Alexander von Humboldt Award in 1974.

== Selected publications ==
- Drug-DNA interactions: structures and spectra, 1st ed., Wiley Methods of Biochemical Analysis (2008). ISBN 978-0471786269
- Infrared and Raman Spectra of Inorganic and Coordination Compounds, Part A: Theory and Applications in Inorganic Chemistry, 6th ed., Wiley Interscience (2009). ISBN 978-0471743392
- Infrared and Raman Spectra of Inorganic and Coordination Compounds, Part B: Applications in Coordination, Organometallic, and Bioinorganic Chemistry, 6th ed., Wiley Interscience (2009). ISBN 978-0471744931
