= School of Professional Studies =

School of Professional Studies may refer to:

- Columbia University School of Professional Studies, at Columbia University in New York City, New York. U.S.
- CUNY School of Professional Studies, at City University of New York in New York City, New York. U.S.
- Delhi School of Professional Studies and Research, a business school in New Delhi, India
- New York University School of Professional Studies, at New York University in New York City, New York. U.S.
- Catholic University of America School of Professional Studies, at Catholic University of America in Washington, D.C.

== See also ==
- College of Professional Studies (disambiguation)
- Georgetown University School of Continuing Studies, at Georgetown University in Washington, D.C, U.S.
- Master of Professional Studies, a type of master's degree
