= Andrew B. Williams =

American engineer

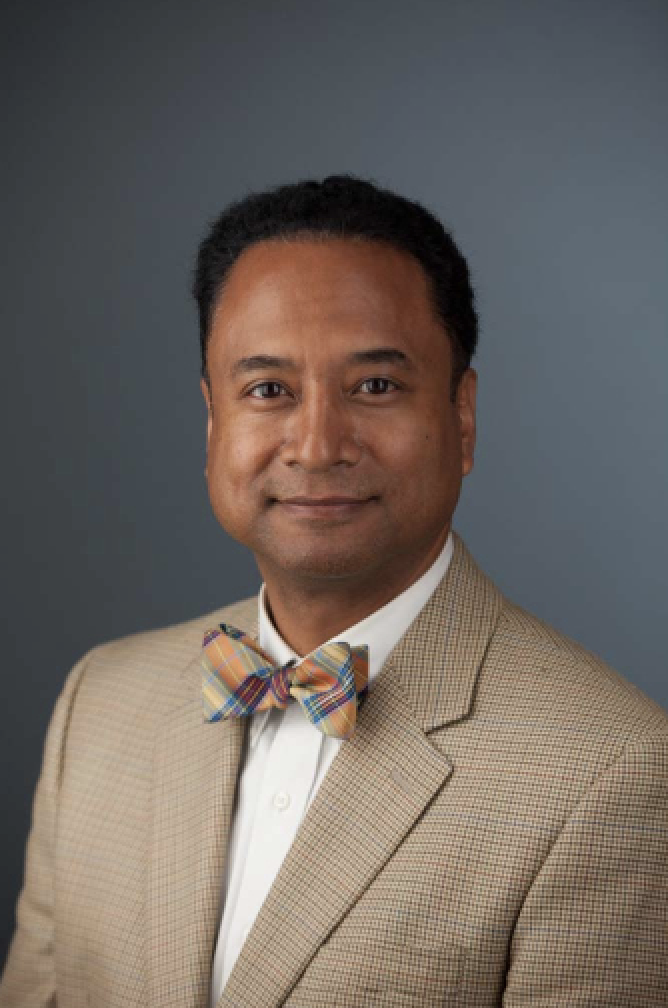
- Education: Rockhurst University, M.B.A The University of Kansas, PhD in Electrical Engineering Marquette University, M.S. in Electrical and Computer Engineering The University of Kansas, B.S. in Electrical Engineering
- Occupations: Dean of Engineering and the Louis S. LeTellier Chair for The Citadel School of Engineering in Charleston Associate Dean Diversity, Equity, & Inclusion and Spahr Professor of Electrical Engineering & Computer Science
- Employer(s): The Citadel School of Engineering, Charleston The University of Kansas Marquette University AppRobo LLC Spelman College The Boeing Company Apple University of Iowa GE Healthcare
- Known for: Humanoid Robotics, Diversity in STEM
- Notable work: Author of the book "Out of the Box: Building Robots, Transforming Lives"

Andrew B. Williams is an American academic in the field of engineering. He is fomer Dean of Engineering and the Louis S. LeTellier Chair for The Citadel School of Engineering in Charleston. He was the Associate Dean for Diversity, Equity, and Inclusion at the University of Kansas, and the Charles E. and Mary Jane Spahr Professor in Electrical Engineering and Computer Science.

== Education ==
Williams graduated from the University of Kansas in 1988 with a B.S. degree in electrical engineering. He then attended Marquette University and earned an M.S. degree in Electrical & Computer Engineering in 1995 before returning to the University of Kansas and graduating with a Ph.D. degree in electrical engineering in 1999. His thesis was on learning ontologies in multi-agent systems. He was the first African American to graduate from the University of Kansas with a Ph.D. degree in electrical engineering.

== Career and research ==
In 1999, Williams was appointed as an assistant professor in the electrical and computer engineering department at the University of Iowa where he started RAMP-IT, a computer and robotics day camp for underrepresented students. In 2004, Williams served as department chair in Computer and Information Sciences at Spelman College in Atlanta, GA and as a Research Affiliate at Georgia Institute of Technology in the Human-Automation Systems Lab. In 2012, Williams joined Marquette University as a professor and the John P. Raynor, S.J., Distinguished Chair of Electrical & Computer Engineering. There he directed the Humanoid Engineering & Intelligent Robotics (HEIR) Lab. Williams's research is in humanoid robotics and AI, intelligent humanoid coaches, and cooperative autonomous systems.

Williams was the first Senior Engineering Diversity Manager at Apple Inc. under Steve Jobs. He was named a National Science Foundation ScienceMaker for his national efforts to increase STEM diversity. While at Spelman College, he founded and directed the SpelBots, an internationally known all-female RoboCup robotics team. He also authored the book Out of the Box: Building Robots, Transforming Lives.

== Selected publications ==
- "Learning to Share Meaning in a Multi-Agent System," J. of Autonomous Agents and Multi-Agent Systems, vol. 8, no. 2, 165–193, 2004.
- Out of the Box: Building Robots, Transforming Lives (with E. Gilbreath), Moody Publishers and Institute for Black Family Development, Chicago, 2009.
- "The Potential Social Impact of the Artificial Intelligence Divide," Ethics, Safety, and Trust in Intelligent Agents, AAAI 2018 Spring Symposium, Stanford, CA, March 2018.

== Awards and honors ==
- National Science Foundation ScienceMaker
- Mike and Joyce Shinn Innovator and Leader Award, KU Black Alumni Network
- Selected as TEDx UW-Milwaukee speaker
- Marquette University Tribee Award, HEIR Lab, Student Chapter of the Year
- 20 Most Creative Milwaukeeans, Milwaukee Magazine, November 2013
- NPR's Tell Me More Black Tech Game Changers
- IEEE Computer Society Distinguished Speaker
- National Academy of Engineering Frontiers in Engineering Participant
- GEM Consortium Alumni Mentoring Award
- Marquette University Young Engineering Alumni Award
