= Francis Wade =

American philosopher professor (1907–1987)

Francis C. Wade
- Born: November 11, 1907; Whitesboro, Texas, U.S.
- Died: July 6, 1987 (aged 79)
- Education: Xavier University; Saint Louis University
- Occupations: Philosopher, Historian, Professor

Francis C. Wade (November 11, 1907 – July 6, 1987) was an American Jesuit and professor of philosophy at Marquette University.

== Biography ==
Wade was born on November 11, 1907, in Whitesboro, Texas, where he was baptized in St. Thomas Church. He was the son of George H. Wade and Virginia M. (Ligon) Wade. He was educated at Whitesboro Public School and at St. Mary's College High School, St. Marys, Kansas. He entered the Society of Jesus in 1925. He was awarded his B.A. from Xavier University in 1930, his M.A. from Saint Louis University in 1932, and his S.T.L. from Saint Louis University in 1939.

== Marquette University (1945-1985) ==
Wade held several positions at Marquette University. In September, 1945 he moved to Marquette University, where he was to teach for 40 years. For the first eleven years he taught philosophy and religion and then taught philosophy alone for 29 more years from 1957 to 1985. Wade is best known for his teaching of metaphysics, rational psychology, history of philosophy, and in later years, ethics. In 1970 Wade was awarded the Pere Marquette Award for Teaching Excellence.

Along with Fr. Gerard Smith he helped to mold the Philosophy Department into its current state. Wade helped to develop courses in atheism, racial justice, Black thought, war and peace, death, and others. He willingly participated in the Great Books movement both in an outside the university. He was a leading force in and presided over the committee on faculty for many years, and he was an esteemed collaborator on many university boards and committees. He was always seen as a priest teaching truth, preaching by his words and actions the Gospel of Christ. He worked devotedly on the WISCOM, a province planning group on the better choice of apostolic ministries.

== Books ==
Wade had five books published, at least 22 articles, a number of book reviews, and often delivered sermons. He wrote a history of the Marquette Philosophy Department. Wade was also known to write poetry.

- The Catholic University and The Faith, 1978
- A brief history of the philosophy department at Marquette University, 1881–1981, 1981
- Teaching and morality, 1963
- The Trinity, Or The First Principle : De Trinitate, Seu De Primo Principio, 1989

== Archival collections ==
Francis Clarence Wade, S.J., Papers, Marquette University.

== See also ==
- Marquette University
- Society of Jesus
- Marquette University Special Collections and University Archives
- American philosophy
- List of American philosophers
