= Marquette University College of Education =

College in Milwaukee, Wisconsin

Coordinates: 43.037744°N 87.932146°W

- Type: Private
- Affiliations: Catholic, Jesuit
- Dean: Dr. William A. Henk
- Academic staff: 21
- Location: Milwaukee, WI, United States
- Campus: Urban
- Website: marquette.edu/education

The Marquette University College of Education is one of the primary colleges at Marquette University, located in Milwaukee, Wisconsin. The college oversees curricula related to the training of current and future educators, offering both undergraduate- and graduate-level courses and degrees.

The institution was named after Rev. Jacques Marquette, S.J (1637-75), who was a French missionary an explorer in North America.

== Academics ==
The college oversees the curriculum and instruction in teacher preparation, offering Bachelor of Science degrees, several Master of Arts and Master of Education degrees, and doctoral degrees. Students also receive teaching certification and Wisconsin state licensure when earning their degrees. Certification can be earned in elementary/middle education (grades 1–8) or middle/secondary education (grades 6–12). Students receiving their Bachelor of Science in Education must also pursue a second major in an approved subject such as history, chemistry, mathematics, a foreign language or even theatre arts.

=== Accreditation ===
Marquette University is accredited by the North Central Association of Colleges and Secondary Schools, and the College of Education in particular has two separate accreditation bodies. The college's PhD in Counseling Psychology program received its accreditation from the American Psychological Association while the B.S., M.A. and M.Ed. programs received theirs from the National Council for Accreditation of Teacher Education (NCATE). The college has been continuously accredited by NCATE since 1961, and the next round of visits will occur in 2017.

=== Rankings ===
For 2014, U.S. News & World Report ranked the college's graduate degree program as 65th overall by U.S. News, up from 79th. Marquette is thus ranked as the second-best graduate education school in Wisconsin, tied with UW-Milwaukee and behind only UW-Madison.

=== Teach For America ===
In 2009, Marquette began partnering with Teach For America ("TFA"), preparing incoming teachers assigned to the Milwaukee area for certification. TFA members have the option to enroll in a combined post-baccalaureate certification and Master of Education program at the college during their two-year assignment in Milwaukee.
