= Les Aspin Center for Government =

Extension of Marquette University

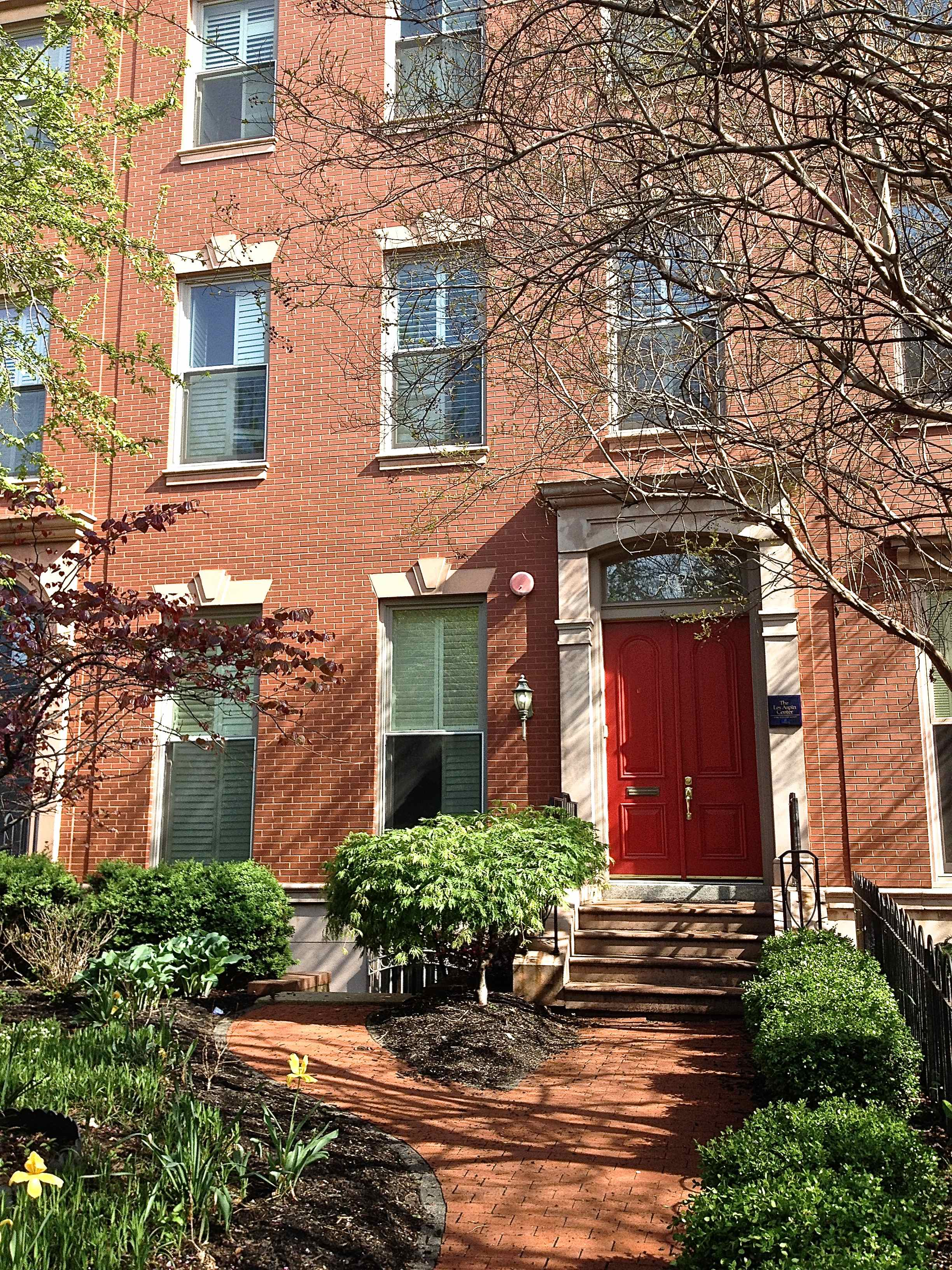
- Established: 1984
- Director: Dr. Paul Nolette
- Faculty: 6
- Address: 502 East Capitol Street NE
- Location: Capitol Hill, Washington, D.C.
- Coordinates: 38.890159°N 76.999196°W
- Interactive map of Les Aspin Center for Government
- Website: mu.edu/aspin

The Les Aspin Center for Government, or simply the Les Aspin Center or "LAC" is an educational program and extension of Marquette University based in the Capitol Hill neighborhood of Washington, D.C., with a separate office at Marquette's home campus in Milwaukee, Wisconsin. The Center's mission is to offer students who are interested in public policy a chance to work and study in the United States capital or study abroad in developing countries like Kenya and Tanzania through its Africa program. The Les Aspin Center's permanent building in D.C. hosts students for semester or summer classes while they also complete internships in various government sectors.

The Center is named for former secretary of defense and Marquette political science professor, Les Aspin, who died shortly before the permanent center was opened in 1995.

== History ==
The Les Aspin Center for Government was started in 1988 by Marquette University Professor Rev. Timothy O'Brien.

Designed initially to offer current undergraduate students interested in public policy an avenue for earning summer internship experience in Washington, the LAC has since acquired property in the city for classroom and living space, and it has evolved into a semester-long political science program offering classes on both foreign and domestic public policy.

Over 1,600 students have interned at over 100 different NGOs, congressional offices and government agencies since the program began in 1984. The Center also bestows awards on public officials who have supported its mission or directly impacted the program. Past honorees include congressmen Daniel Inouye and Dave Obey, Ambassador Richard Holbrooke, Senator Dick Durbin, former Wisconsin governor Tommy Thompson and insurance company Northwestern Mutual.
