= Andrew Williams (Cumberland cricketer) =

English cricketer (born 1970)

Andrew Stephen Williams (born 12 December 1970 in Radcliffe, Lancashire) is an English cricketer who played for Cumberland.

Williams made a single List A appearance for the team, in the C&G Trophy competition in 2001. Batting in the upper order, he scored 19 runs in the only innings in which he batted in List A cricket, as Cumberland left the competition at the third-round stage beaten by Kent.
