= Syracuse University College of Professional Studies =

Continuing education school at Syracuse University

College of Professional Studies
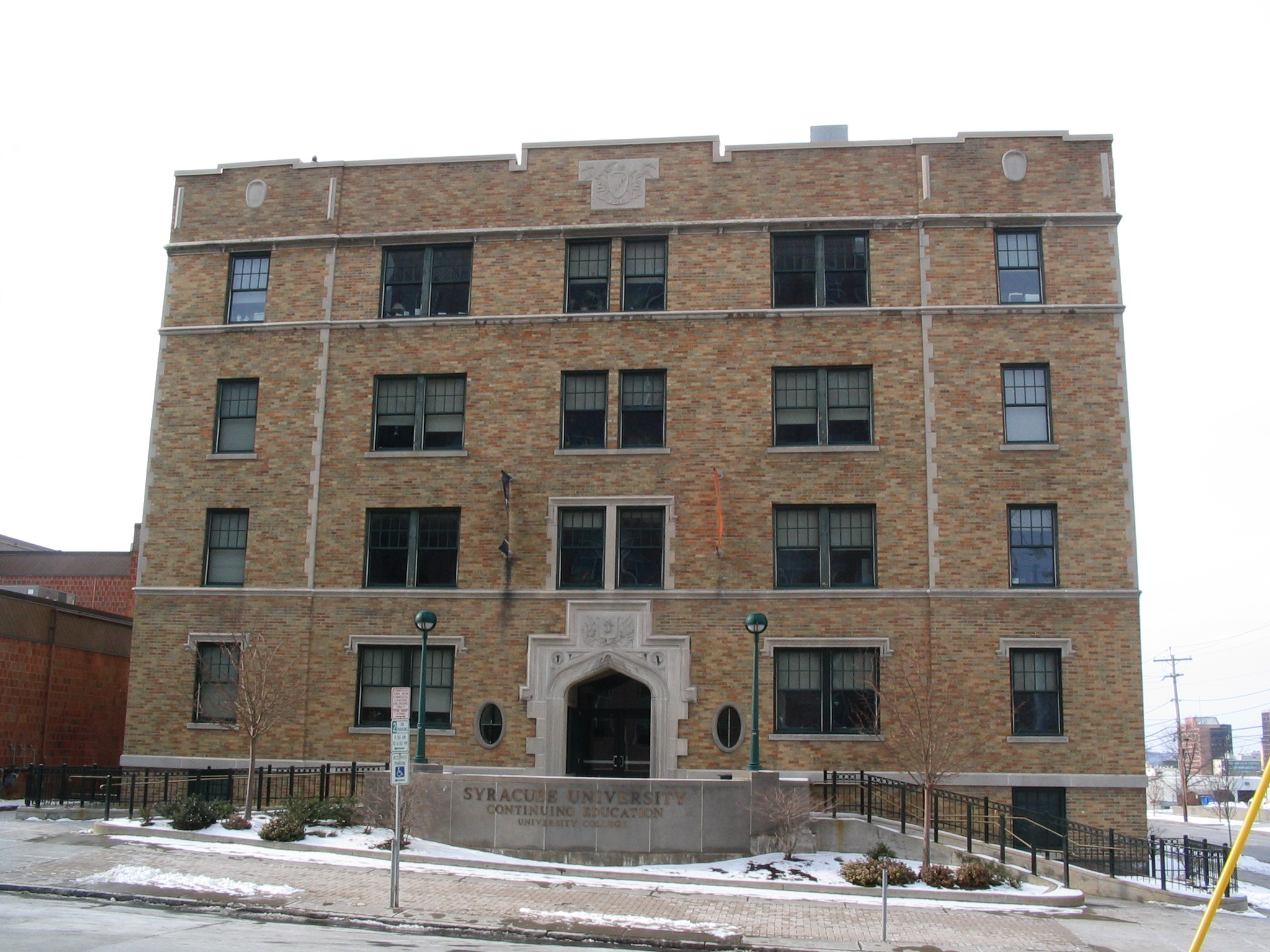
- University College building on corner of University Ave. and E. Adams St.
- Former names: University College (1946–2021); School of Extension (1930–1946); Evening Session (1918–1930)
- Type: Private
- Established: 1918; 108 years ago
- Parent institution: Syracuse University
- Dean: Michael Frasciello
- Address: 700 University Ave, Syracuse, New York, United States; 43.04242°N 76.13466°W
- Campus: Urban
- Website: professionalstudies.syr.edu

The Syracuse University College of Professional Studies, formerly known as University College, is one of Syracuse University’s twelve degree-granting academic schools and colleges and serves as the continuing education division of Syracuse University in Syracuse, New York. Chartered in 1947, the college offers online associate, bachelor's and master's degrees and credit certificates. Syracuse University was one of the first universities in the U.S. open to non-traditional, part-time adult students.

== History ==
The school traces its roots to 1902 when Syracuse University began offering summer courses to part-time students. In 1918, the Evening Session program was officially launched to increase access to higher education and allow non-traditional students and working adults to gain the education needed to excel in conditions created by World War I. All courses were held after 7:30 p.m. and tuition was $5 per credit at the time.

As enrollment and academic offerings increased, it was renamed to the School of Extension Teaching and Adult Education in 1930. It was formerly chartered and renamed again to University College in 1947 to reflect its equal status with other SU colleges and schools.

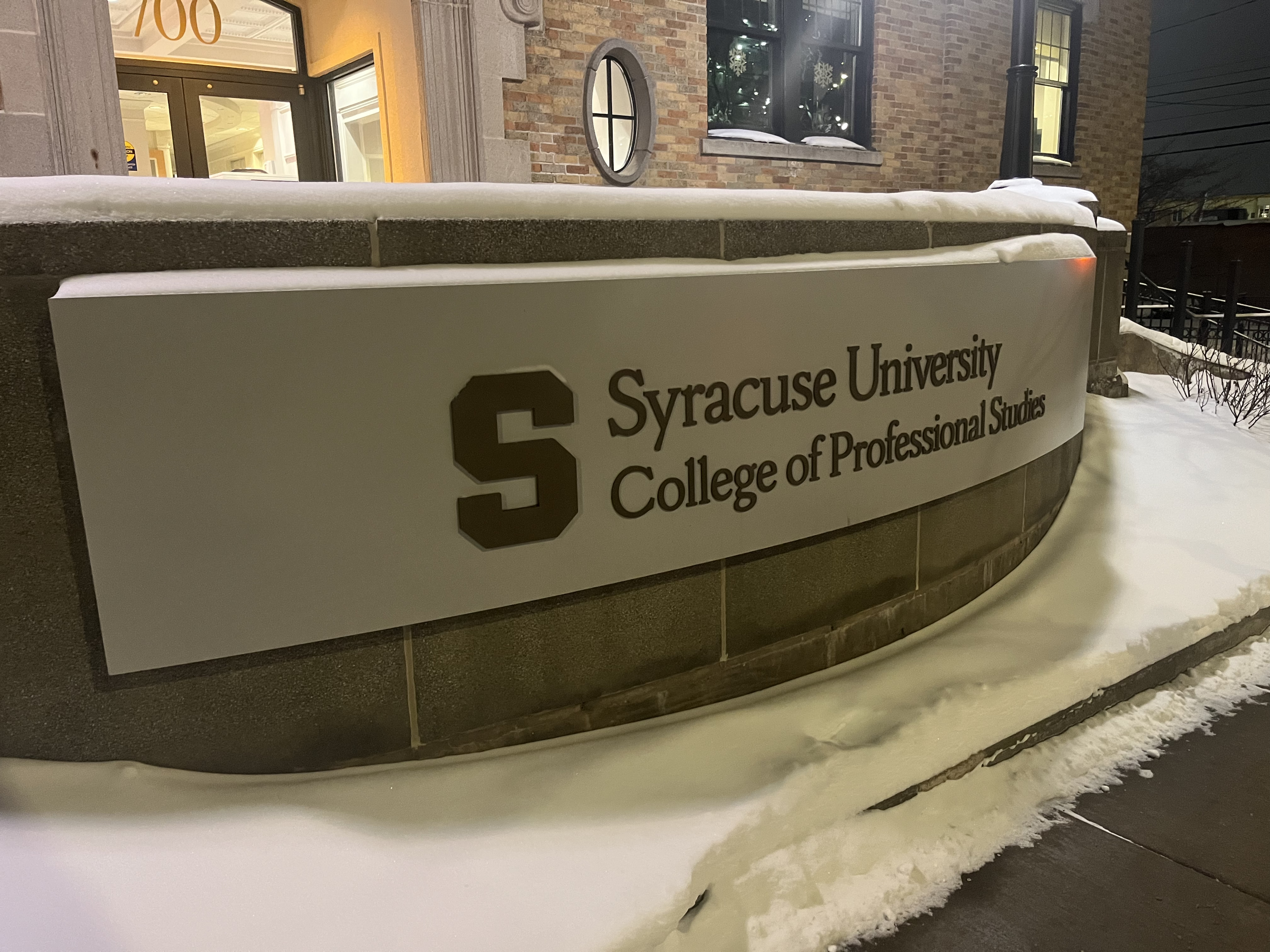
Sign at the University College building

The school was housed in Peck Hall, the home of SU's former College of Medicine, from 1947 until 1957 when it relocated to Reid Hall. Since 1998, the school has been located at 700 University Avenue.

In 2021, the college was renamed the College of Professional Studies.

== Academics ==
The college offers online undergraduate degree programs and supports commuter students completing degrees through part-time study in collaboration with other SU colleges and schools. It offers online Bachelor of Professional Studies (BPS) in several disciplines and a Master of Professional Studies (MPS) in project management.

The Summer College program is offered to high school students aged 15 or older, which provides prospective students an opportunity to take a college-level course, live in a residence hall, and experience life at college.
