= Andrew Williams (Shropshire cricketer) =

Welsh cricketer

Andrew Williams (born 13 September 1965) is a Welsh cricketer and former right-handed batsman and right-arm off-break bowler who played for Shropshire. between 1986 and 1993. He was born in Wrexham, North Wales

His only List A appearance was against Middlesex at St George's Cricket Ground, Telford in the NatWest Trophy on the 24th June 1992. Centuries from Desmond Haynes (101) and Mike Roseberry (112) enabled Middlesex to set a target of 294 from 60 overs. Opening the batting against Angus Fraser and Dean Headley, Williams was caught behind by wicketkeeper Keith Brown for 6 with Shropshire being bowled out for 149 runs and losing the game by 145 runs.

He had made his debut for Shropshire in the final Minor Counties Championship fixture of the 1986 season against Wiltshire on his home ground at Newport CC. Selected for his off spin, he ended with match figures of 2-72 off 24 overs. Williams had to wait until 1992 to mark his return to the side. As an opening bat he scored 219 runs from five championship games including an appearance against Wales Minor Counties at Penrhyn Avenue home of Colwyn Bay C.C. He had a top score of 69 in the game against Wiltshire, at St George's Cricket Ground, Telford

Williams made three further championship appearances in the 1993 season against Oxfordshire, Berkshire and Herefordshire. This was his final appearance in Minor County Cricket.

He first played club cricket for Forton CC before moving to nearby Newport CC in the Shropshire League. In 1987 and 1988, Williams also played Grade Cricket for Melville CC in Perth, West Australia. He spent six seasons with Wolverhampton CC in the Birmingham and District League between 1993 and 1998. He later joined Leycett in the North Staffs and South Cheshire League
