= Rajendra Rathore (chemist) =

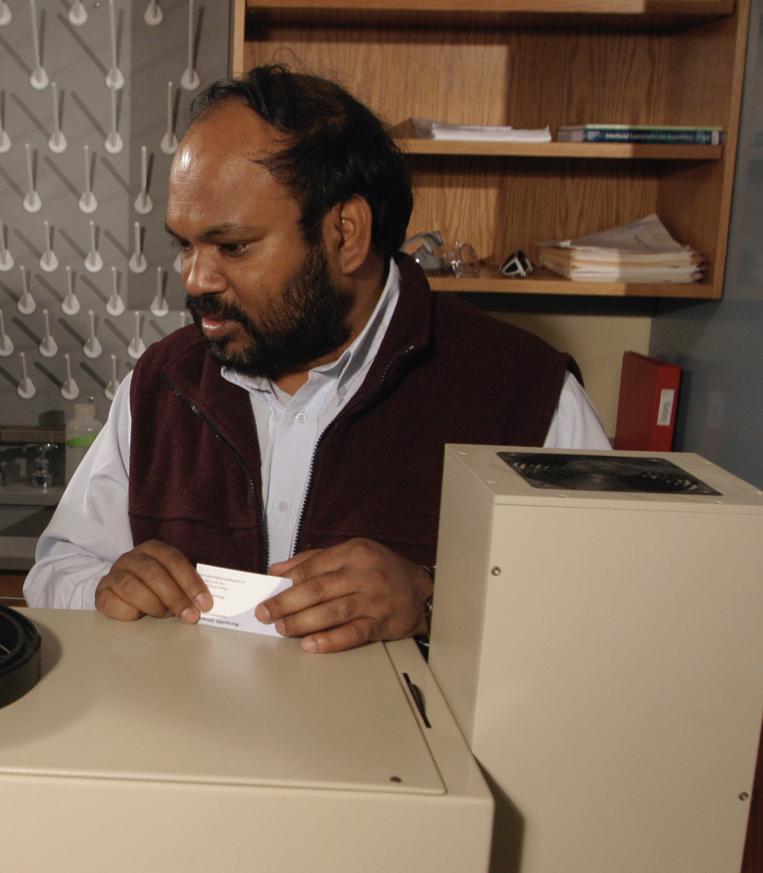
- Rathore in his chemistry lab
- Born: 12 December 1961; Kannauj, Uttar Pradesh, India
- Died: 16 February 2018 (aged 56); Milwaukee, Wisconsin, USA
- Education: University of Western Ontario; Indian Institute of Technology Kanpur
- Awards: Pfeltschinger-Habermann Chaired Professor of Organic Chemistry; Helen Way Klingler College of Arts and Sciences Scholar of the Year, 2017–2018
- Scientific career
- Fields: Organic chemistry
- Workplaces: Indian Institute of Technology Kanpur; University of Western Ontario; University of Houston; Marquette University
- Thesis: Stereoelectronic Effects, Mechanism, and Synthesis in Sulfonyl Chemistry (1990)

Rajendra Rathore (12 December 1961 – 16 February 2018) was an organic chemist and professor at Marquette University in Milwaukee, Wisconsin as Pfletschinger-Habermann professor of organic chemistry. He made important contributions in the area of supramolecular chemistry, synthesis of novel electro-active molecules, and drug discovery. Rathore died on 16 February 2018, after complications from chronic pulmonary sarcoidosis.

== Education ==
Rathore received his M.Sc. from the Indian Institute of Technology Kanpur in 1986, under the mentorship of S. Chandrasekaran. He earned his Ph.D. in organic chemistry from the University of Western Ontario in London, Canada in 1990. He was a post-doctoral research associate and then a visiting assistant professor during 1992–2000 at the University of Houston under the supervision of Jay Kochi. Rajendra Rathore joined the faculty at Marquette University in 2000.

== Research ==
Rathore was the Pfletschinger-Habermann Professor of Organic Chemistry at Marquette University. He was also nominated for the Helen Way Klingler College of Arts and Sciences Scholar of the Year for 2017–2018, in recognition of outstanding scholarly contributions over the past three years, which he was awarded and received posthumously. Rathore made key contributions to the areas of organic supramolecular and materials chemistry. His interests focused in rational design and synthesis of novel electro-active molecules with applications in molecular recognition, photovoltaics, molecular electronics, and drug discovery. In particular, Rathore was well known for his contributions to studies of the Scholl reaction mechanism, syntheses of cofacially arrayed polyfluorenes, and applications of nitric oxide complexes with aromatic donors. His recent work was focused on elucidating the application of frontier molecular orbitals (FMOs) in the rational design of novel charge-transfer materials.

=== Synthesis of pillarene ===
In 1995 Rathore and Kochi reported a synthetic procedure to produce various diarylmethanes from their corresponding benzyl methyl ethers. They showed that transformation of bis(methoxymethyl)-p-hydroquinone ether yields corresponding diarylmethane and a polymeric-like material. A reanalysis of this polymeric material showed that it consisted mainly from pillararene. A full characterization of pillararene was first reported in 2008 by Tomoki Ogoshi et al.

== Personal life ==
Rajendra Rathore was born in Kannauj, India in 1961. In college in Kanpur, India, he met his wife, Rajni. They had two girls.

In October 2018, Marquette University held the Rajendra Rathore Memorial Symposium, where friends and colleagues of Rathore spoke about their research and Rathore's influence on their science and lives.
