= Frank Wade (cricketer) =

Australian cricketer

Personal information
- Full name: Frank Hainsworth Wade
- Born: 1 September 1871; Yorkshire, Northern England
- Died: 4 October 1940 (aged 69); New South Wales, Australia

Domestic team information
- Years: Team
- 1895–1896: New South Wales
- Source: ESPNcricinfo, 10 December 2015

Frank Hainsworth Wade (1 September 1871 – 4 October 1940) was an Australian cricketer. He played 5 first-class cricket matches for New South Wales between 1895 and 1896, scoring 145 runs and taking two wickets.

== See also ==
- List of New South Wales representative cricketers
