= Marquette University College of Engineering =

Coordinates: 43.038391°N 87.93249°W

Marquette University Opus College of Engineering
- Type: Private
- Affiliations: Catholic, Jesuit
- Dean: Kristina Ropella
- Undergraduates: 864
- Postgraduates: 180
- Location: Milwaukee, Wisconsin, United States
- Campus: Urban
- Website: marquette.edu/engineering

The Marquette University Opus College of Engineering is one of the primary colleges at Marquette University, located in Milwaukee, Wisconsin. The college oversees curricula related to the research and application of engineering and its various subfields.

== Academics ==
The college oversees the curriculum and instruction in all of the engineering-related majors offered by the university. The Opus College of Engineering offers Bachelor's, Master's and Ph.D. degrees across seven majors. Within the college are four academic departments:

- Biomedical engineering
- Civil, construction, and environmental engineering
- Electrical and computer engineering
- Mechanical engineering

In 2011, the college opened a new facility, Engineering Hall, to house laboratories.

The college is home to a major interdisciplinary machine shop and hands-on work center, called the Discovery Learning Laboratory, as well as the Marquette University Humanoid Engineering & Intelligent Robotics Lab. Researchers in the college have built a visualization lab to create 3D-interactive exhibits and activities.

Projects conducted by the college range from human-powered nebulizers to designing humanoid robots that help combat childhood obesity. A student team in the college is building a CubeSat that they will launch into space with NASA in 2016 or 2017.

=== Rankings ===
As of 2025, U.S. News & World Report ranks the college even 145 out of the 198 best engineering schools in the country.

In 2012, U.S. News & World Report ranked the college's biomedical engineering program at 51st among all programs nationwide. The college as a whole is ranked as the top Jesuit-affiliated college of engineering in the United States.
