= Marquette University College of Business Administration =

College in Milwaukee, Wisconsin, U.S.

Coordinates: 43.037736°N 87.927779°W

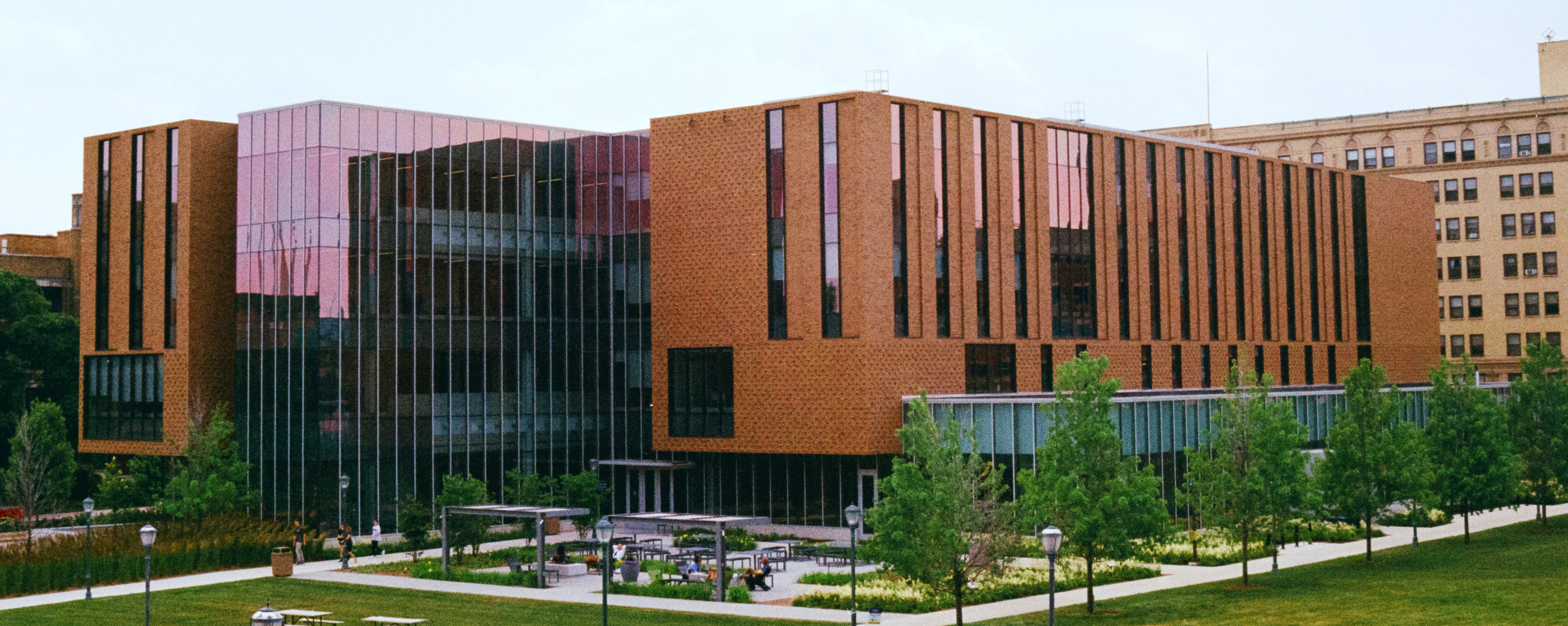
- Type: Private
- Established: 1910
- Religious affiliation: Catholic, Jesuit
- Academic affiliations: AACSB
- Dean: Andrew DeGuire
- Faculty: 130
- Students: 1,875
- Undergraduates: 1,514
- Postgraduates: 361
- Location: Milwaukee, Wisconsin, U.S.
- Campus: Urban
- Website: business.marquette.edu

The Marquette University College of Business Administration is one of the primary colleges at Marquette University, located in Milwaukee, Wisconsin.

== History ==
The College of Business Administration was founded in 1910 as simply the School of Economics, and obtained its current status as a college in 1923. Forty-three years later, in 1953, the college offered its first graduate school classes. The graduate programs were spun off into the Marquette University Graduate School of Management in 2006. In 2008, the alumni base of the college topped 20,000 graduates worldwide.

== Programs and reputation ==
The College of Business Administration offers bachelor's, master's and executive master's degrees as well as dual-degree programs in conjunction with other schools such as law. The college is divided between six academic departments: Accounting, Economics, Finance, Management, International Business and Marketing. The college also has centers focusing in Real Estate, Sales, Economics and Supply Chain, as well as a commercial banking and investment management program.

In 2024, U.S. News & World Report ranked Marquette's executive MBA and part-time MBA programs in the top 30 and top 75 in the nation, respectively. The same set of rankings placed Marquette's overall undergraduate business ranking at 118th nationally. The undergraduate programs in accounting, real estate, finance and supply chain management were among the top business specialty programs, coming in at 46th, 21st, 12th and 17th respectively.
