= Marquette University College of Professional Studies =

Coordinates: 43.039085°N 87.926046°W

- Type: Private
- Established: 1996
- Affiliations: Catholic, Jesuit
- Dean: Robert Deahl
- Location: Milwaukee, WI, United States
- Campus: Urban
- Website: marquette.edu/cps

The Marquette University College of Professional Studies is one of the 11 constituent colleges at Marquette University, located in Milwaukee, Wisconsin. The college offers classes designed for working adults, and it offers undergraduate and graduate degrees as well as graduate certificates. It also runs a community leadership training program for Milwaukee-area professionals called Future Milwaukee.

== Academics ==
The school began in 1996 as a way to offer courses, both degree-track and non-degree-track courses, to working adults past the traditional age (18–23 years old) of most undergraduate students. Today, classes are held on weeknights, Saturdays, partially online, and completely online. The college awards bachelor's degrees in the subjects of organization and leadership, professional communication, criminology and law studies, and psychology. Options for graduate degrees and certificates include leadership studies, public service, dispute resolution, law enforcement leadership, and management and sports leadership.
