= Marquette University =

Jesuit university in Milwaukee, Wisconsin, US

- Former name: Marquette College (1881–1907)
- Motto: Ad maiorem Dei gloriam (Latin)
- Motto in English: "For the greater glory of God"
- Type: Private research university
- Established: August 28, 1881; 145 years ago
- Founder: John Henni
- Accreditation: HLC
- Religious affiliation: Catholic (Jesuit)
- Academic affiliations: ACCU; AJCU; CUMU; NAICU; WAICU
- Endowment: $1.13 billion (2025)
- President: Kimo Ah Yun
- Faculty: 1,186 (fall 2023)
- Students: 11,373 (fall 2023)
- Undergraduates: 7,652 (fall 2023)
- Postgraduates: 3,721 (fall 2023)
- Location: Milwaukee, Wisconsin, U.S. 43°02′21″N 87°55′57″W
- Campus: Urban, 93 acres (37.6 ha)
- Alma Mater song: Marquette University Anthem
- Fight song: Ring Out Ahoya
- Colors: Blue & Gold
- Nickname: Golden Eagles
- Sporting affiliations: NCAA Division I – Big East
- Mascot: Iggy the Golden Eagle
- Website: marquette.edu

Marquette University (/mɑːrˈkɛt/) is a private Jesuit research university in Milwaukee, Wisconsin, United States. It was established as Marquette College on August 28, 1881, by John Henni, the first Archbishop of the Archdiocese of Milwaukee. Initially an all-male institution, Marquette became the first coeducational Catholic university in the world in 1909.

Marquette is part of the Association of Jesuit Colleges and Universities. The university is accredited by the Higher Learning Commission and had an enrollment of about 11,000 students in 2023. It is classified among "R2: Doctoral Universities – High research activity". Marquette is ninth largest Catholic university by enrollment in the United States and the largest private university in Wisconsin.

Marquette is organized into 11 schools and colleges at its main Milwaukee campus, offering programs in the liberal arts, business, communication, education, engineering, law, and health sciences disciplines. The university also administers classes in suburbs around the Milwaukee area and in Washington, D.C. While most students are pursuing undergraduate degrees, the university has over 68 doctoral and master's degree programs, a law school, a dental school (the only such school in the state of Wisconsin), and 22 graduate certificate programs.

The university's varsity athletic teams, known as the Golden Eagles, are members of the Big East Conference and compete in the NCAA's Division I in all sports. Among its current and past faculty and alumni are 43 Fulbright Scholars, 6 Truman Scholars, 6 state governors, and 3 U.S. senators.

== History ==
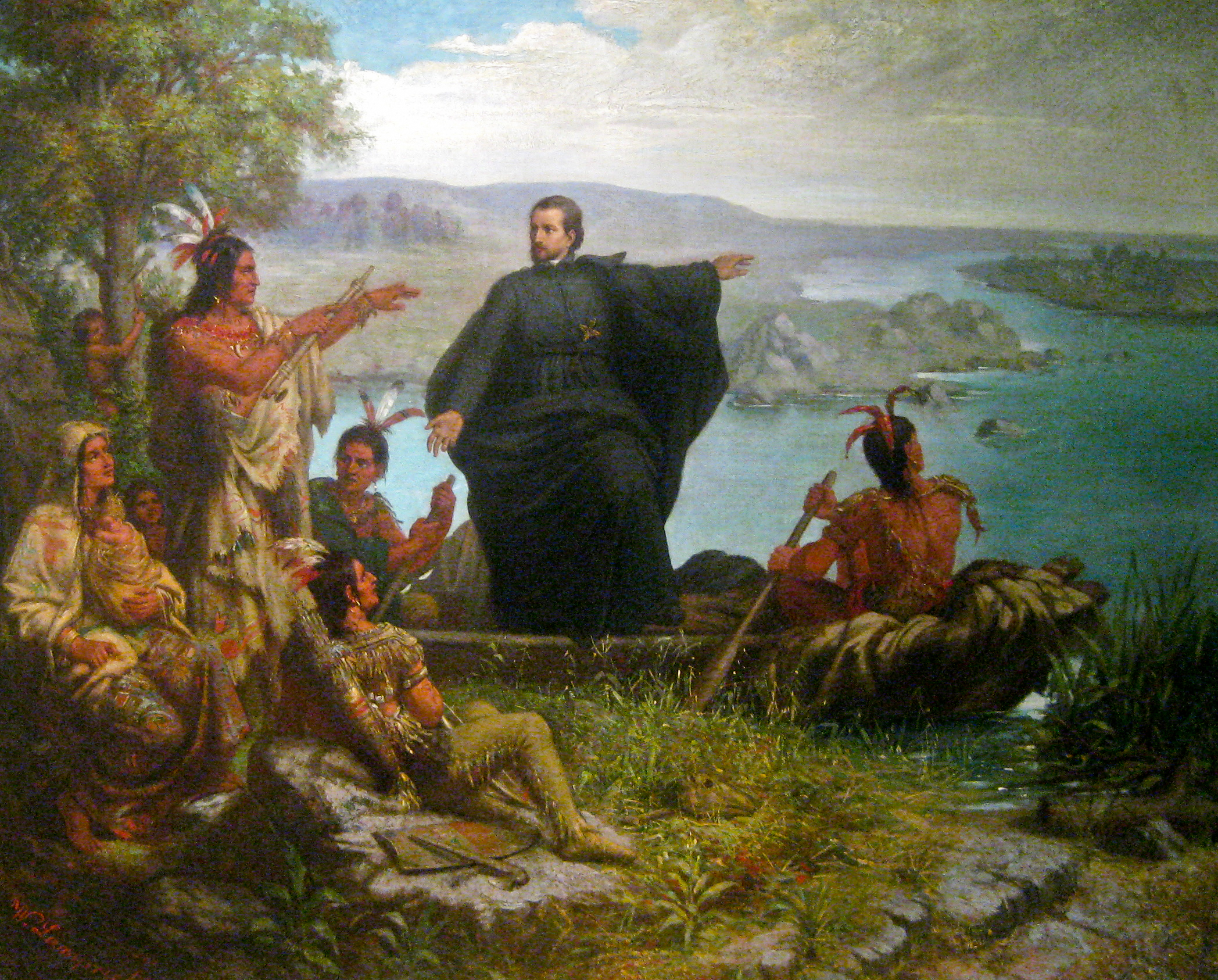
Father Jacques Marquette, the university's namesake

=== Marquette College ===
Marquette University was founded 145 years ago on August 28, 1881, as Marquette College by John Martin Henni, the first Catholic bishop of the Archdiocese of Milwaukee, with the assistance of funding from Belgian businessman Guillaume Joseph DeBuey. The university was named after 17th-century missionary and explorer Father Jacques Marquette. The highest priority of the newly established college was to provide an affordable Catholic education to the area's emerging German immigrant population. The first five graduates of Marquette College received their Bachelor of Arts degrees in 1887. Between 1891 and 1906, the college employed one full-time lay professor, with many classes being taught by master's students. By 1906, Marquette had awarded 186 students the Bachelor of Arts, 38 the Master of Arts, and one student Bachelor of Science.

=== Marquette University ===
Marquette College officially became a university in 1907, after it became affiliated with a local medical school and moved to its present location. Johnston Hall, which now houses the university's College of Communication, was the first building erected on the new campus grounds. Marquette University High School, formerly the preparatory department of the university, became a separate institution the same year. In 1908, Marquette opened an engineering college and purchased two law schools, which would ultimately become the foundation of its current law program. Initially an all-male institution, Marquette University became the first coed Catholic university in the world, when it admitted its first female students in 1909. By 1916 its female students had increased to 375; many other Catholic institutions began adopting similar approaches in their enrollments during the 1910s and 1920s.

Marquette acquired the Wisconsin College of Physicians and Surgeons in 1913, leading to the formation of the Marquette University School of Medicine. During the 1920s and again during the post-World War II years, Marquette rapidly expanded, opening a new library, athletics facilities, classroom buildings, and residence halls. The student population increased markedly as well, met by the construction of buildings for the schools of law, business, dentistry, and the liberal arts. Marquette is credited with offering the first degree program specializing in hospital administration in the United States, and graduated the first two students in 1927. Despite the promising growth of the university, financial constraints led to the School of Medicine separating from Marquette in 1967 to become the Medical College of Wisconsin. Marquette's Golden Avalanche football team was disbanded in December 1960, and basketball became the leading spectator sport at the university.

In the 1960s an early fifteenth century French chapel, St. Martin de Seysseul, which was reputedly connected to St. Joan of Arc and which had been transported to the US in the 1920s, was transferred to the campus. It is, unsurprisingly, the oldest building in Wisconsin.

=== 1970s–present ===
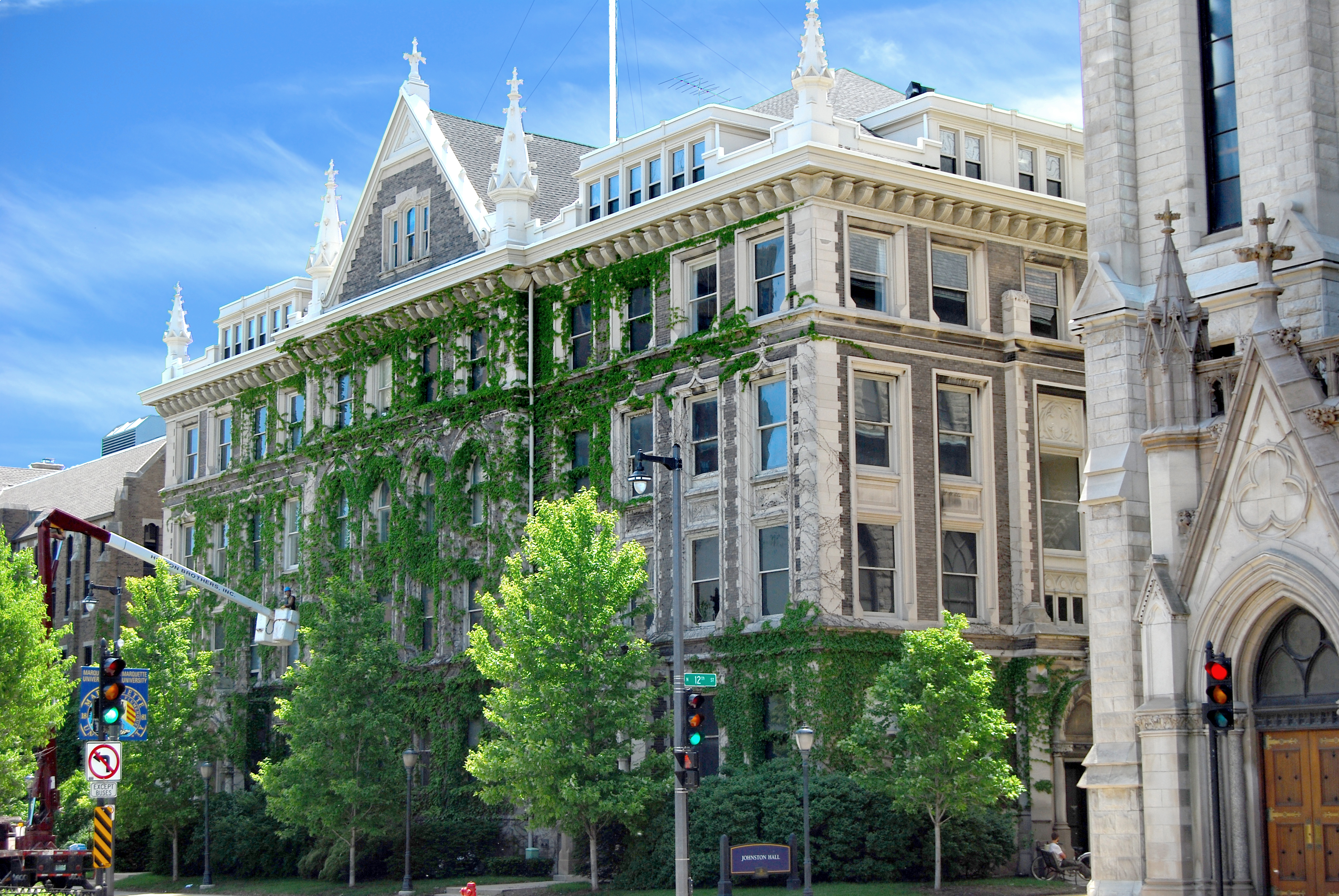
Johnston Hall, the oldest academic building at Marquette

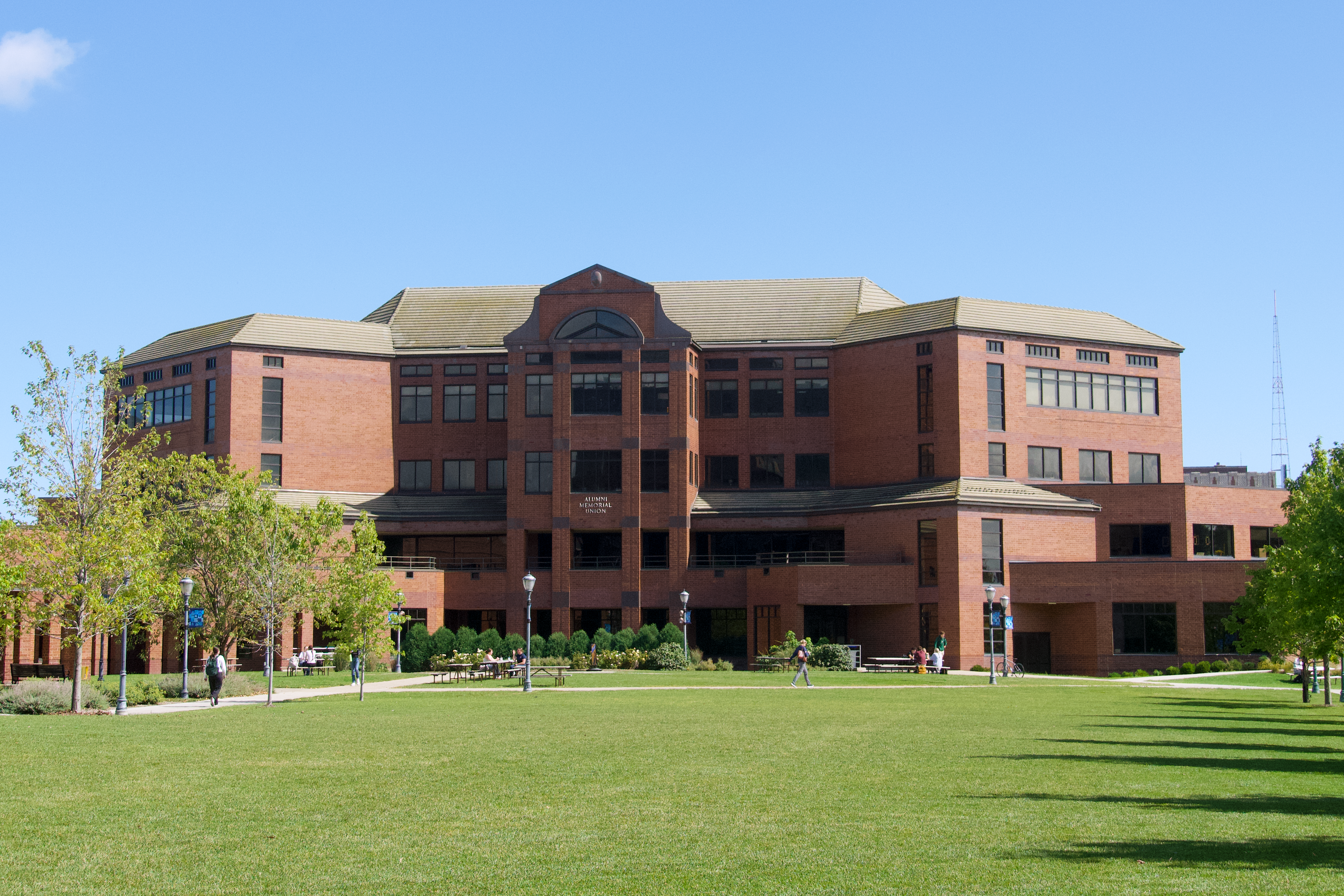
The Alumni Memorial Union at Marquette University

Graduate programs in the liberal arts and sciences, for which planning had begun in the preceding decade, were officially opened in the 1970s. In 1977, the university celebrated the victory of their men's basketball team over the University of North Carolina to win the NCAA Championship title.

In 1994, then-president Albert J. DiUlio made a controversial decision to discontinue the use of the "Warriors" nickname for the university's sports teams, citing growing pressure on schools to end the use of Native American mascots. Backlash from alumni, donors, and students ensued, though the administration and Marquette community eventually settled on the nickname "Golden Eagles". The mascot controversy again boiled over in 2005 when the university's leadership briefly changed the nickname to "the Gold", only to return to the "Golden Eagles" a week later.

During the 1990s, the university invested heavily in the neighborhood surrounding Marquette with its $50 million Campus Circle Project. It also opened a Washington, D.C.–based study center called the Les Aspin Center for Government, named after the former Secretary of Defense. MBA programs and the College of Professional Studies, with programs aimed at adult education, were also founded during the mid-1990s. In 1996, Robert A. Wild was installed as the university's 22nd president and shortly thereafter began a fundraising campaign that culminated in a major campus beautification effort and the construction of several major buildings, including a new space for the School of Dentistry. The university's growth was also marked by increases in overall enrollment and the highest test scores for incoming freshmen to date.

In the early 2000s, Marquette continued to grow, with new residence halls, a library, a School of Dentistry building, and athletics facilities. In 2003 the men's basketball team reached the Final Four, boosting the university's exposure on a national level. Fundraising efforts in the subsequent years helped the university complete its largest-ever capital campaign, the Magis Campaign, which raised over $357 million by 2006.

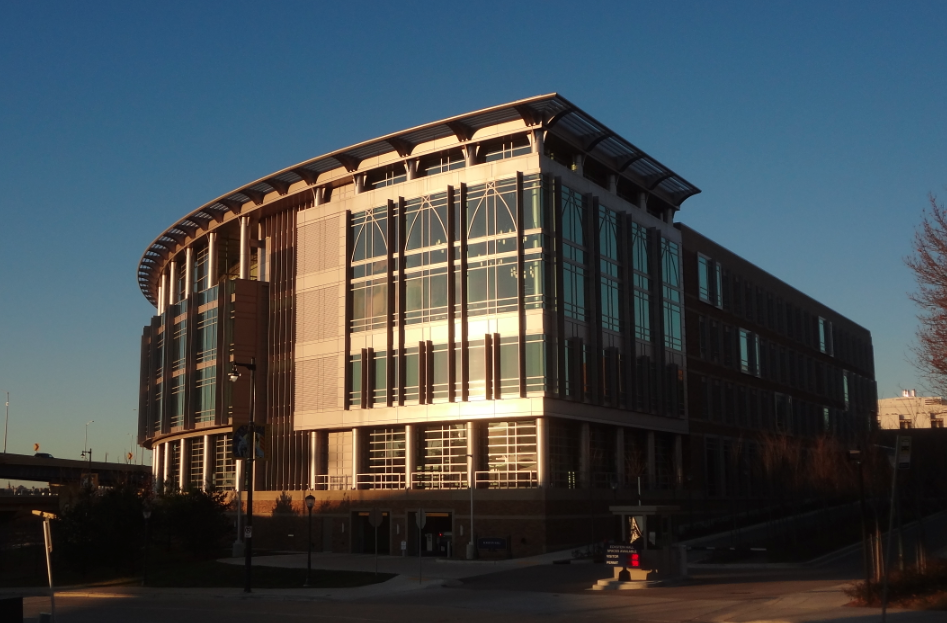
Eckstein Hall, home to the Marquette University Law School

The two largest donations to Marquette University came within the same academic year. The second-largest gift was given by an anonymous couple who have, over time, donated over $50 million to the university. On December 18, 2006, President Wild announced that the couple donated $25 million to the College of Engineering. Less than five months later, on May 4, 2007, Marquette announced a $51 million gift from Raymond and Kathryn Eckstein that would directly benefit the Marquette University School of Law. The gift was the largest amount ever given to a Wisconsin university.

During the Fall 2013 semester, former Marquette president Robert A. Wild returned to Marquette University as interim president following the resignation of his successor and 22nd president of Marquette, Scott Pilarz. Michael Lovell, the former chancellor of the University of Wisconsin–Milwaukee, took over as president on July 1, 2014, following Wild's interim term. Lovell was the first layperson to serve as Marquette's president, as all previous presidents of the university were Catholic clergymen.

On February 28, 2022, the Marquette board of trustees approved an updated university seal and motto. The change was aimed to "reflect Marquette's history, tradition, and catholic, Jesuit mission, and more accurately depict the role of the Indigenous nations that guided Father Marquette on his journey". The updated seal removes an image depicting Fr. Marquette in a canoe pointing the way forward for a Native American guide and replaces it with an image of a river splitting into three, representing the Milwaukee, the Menomonee, and the Kinnickinnic rivers, and three stalks of wild rice in the foreground, to represent the Potawatomi, Menominee, and Ho-Chunk nations, who remain in the Milwaukee area today. With the seal change also came a change to the university's motto. The motto changed from "Numen Flumenque", meaning "God and the (Mississippi) River" to the Jesuit motto "Ad majorem Dei gloriam", meaning "For the greater glory of God".

On June 9, 2024, Marquette's most recent President Michael Lovell died at the age of 57 from sarcoma cancer.

=== Controversies ===
On May 16, 1968, African-American students withdrew from Marquette University in a protest against what they called its "institutional racism". The students demanded the immediate hiring of an African-American administrator. A rally at the student union culminated in the arrest of seven people who refused to leave the building after closing. On May 17, Marquette moved toward the hiring of an African-American administrator to end the campus protest.

In April 2010, Marquette University offered a position as dean of the College of Arts and Sciences to Jodi O'Brien, an openly lesbian professor at another Jesuit university, Seattle University. On May 2, Marquette rescinded the offer over concerns about her scholarly writing as it related to Catholic teaching. O'Brien had published works on lesbian sex and same-sex marriage. Several faculty members at Marquette said the decision raised concerns about academic freedom. Faculty and students from both universities protested Marquette's decision.

On June 21, 2011, a 19-year-old Marquette student reported being raped by an athlete. No report was taken by university officers and the city police were not notified. Marquette University acknowledged that failing to notify police was a violation of state law and that the university had ignored its reporting obligations for 10 years. In at least two cases, the lapse played a role in prosecutors declining to press charges. Marquette had held an administrative hearing on another sexual assault allegation in January 2011. However, by the time the report was filed with police, too much time had elapsed to conduct a proper investigation. In 2016, independent research from The State of Education deemed Marquette University as the least sexually healthy college in the nation.

In the fall of 2014, an undergraduate student disagreed with how a course instructor dealt with the topic of gay rights. After class, the student recorded a conversation with the course instructor in which the course instructor stated that she would not tolerate homophobic, racist, or sexist comments in class. After taking the issue to the university, the student claimed to be shut out and told his academic professor, John McAdams, who posted about it on his personal blog. McAdams was put on suspension for refusing to apologize for his blog post, earning MU a spot on the Foundation for Individual Rights in Education's 2016 "10 Worst Colleges for Free Speech".

== Campus ==
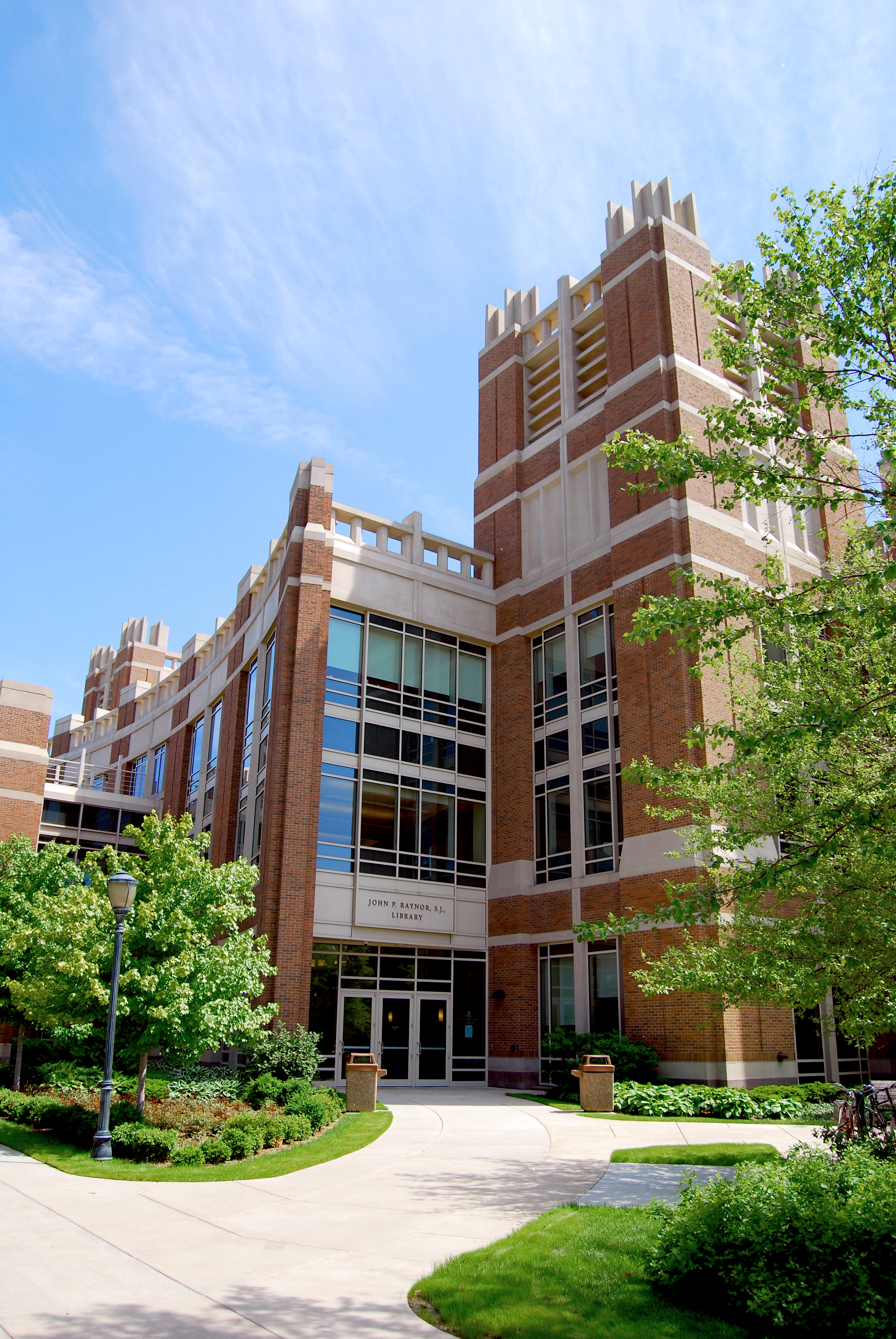
John P. Raynor Library

Marquette is located on a 93-acre (38 ha) campus in the near downtown Milwaukee neighborhood of University Hill, on the former Wisconsin State Fairgrounds. Lake Michigan is roughly one mile east of the edge of campus. The campus stretches 12 blocks east to west and 5 blocks north to south. Wisconsin Avenue, a major thoroughfare in Milwaukee, bisects the campus, placing academic buildings on the south side, and residence halls and other offices and buildings on the north side. Named after the university, the Marquette Interchange, where Interstate Highways 43 and 94 intersect, is also close to campus.

Outside of the main campus, Marquette also operates an athletics facility called Valley Fields, which is home to stadiums for track and field, lacrosse, and soccer teams. Located in the Menomonee Valley, the facility sits along the banks of the Menomonee River, about one mile south of the main Marquette University campus. The university also owns property in Washington, D.C., which houses its Les Aspin Center for Government, a program designed for students interested in careers in public service. The Marquette College of Business Administration hosts off-campus graduate classes in Waukesha and Kohler, Wisconsin, though it does not own these classroom properties.

In 2016, Marquette University's College of Nursing opened a satellite campus in Pleasant Prairie, Wisconsin, for the blended Direct Entry MSN program, where students complete coursework online and spend time on campus learning skills and participating in simulation labs.

In January 2017, the university revealed plans for a $600m project to transform the Milwaukee campus including a BioDiscovery District, Innovation Alley, a recreational and wellness facility, residence hall, and sports research facility.

== Academics ==
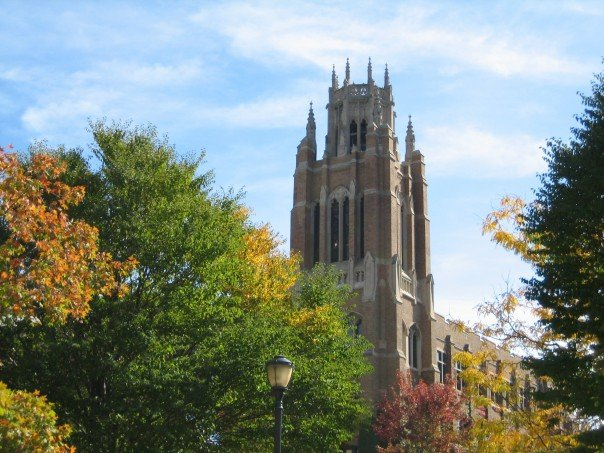
Marquette Hall houses the College of Arts & Sciences' offices

The university includes 11 schools and colleges: the Helen Way Klingler College of Arts and Sciences, the College of Business Administration, the J. William and Mary Diederich College of Communication, the College of Education, the College of Engineering, the College of Health Sciences, the College of Nursing, the College of Professional Studies, the Graduate School, the Marquette University School of Dentistry, and the Marquette University Law School. Marquette's largest college by enrollment is the Helen Way Klingler College of Arts and Sciences.

=== Admissions ===
Undergraduate admissions statistics
- 2022 entering class
- Admit rate: 87.2% (▼ −2.1)
- Yield rate: 14.3% (▼ −3.2)

Test scores middle 50%^{[i]}
- SAT Total: 1180–1350 (among 17% of FTFs)
- ACT Composite: 26–31 (among 30% of FTFs)

The 2022 annual ranking of U.S. News & World Report categorizes Marquette University as "more selective". For the Class of 2026 (enrolled fall 2022), Marquette University received 15,883 applications and accepted 13,851 (87.2%). Of those accepted, 1,983 enrolled, a yield rate (the percentage of accepted students who choose to attend the university) of 14.3%. Marquette University's freshman retention rate is 89.5%, with 82.5% going on to graduate within six years.

Of the 30% of enrolled freshmen in 2022 who submitted ACT scores; the middle 50 percent Composite score was between 26 and 31. Of the 17% of the incoming freshman class who submitted SAT scores; the middle 50 percent Composite scores were 1180–1350.

Marquette University is a college-sponsor of the National Merit Scholarship Program and sponsored 1 Merit Scholarship awards in 2020. In the 2020–2021 academic year, 2 freshman students were National Merit Scholars.

Fall First-Time Freshman Statistics
	2022	2021	2020	2019	2018	2017
Applicants	15,883	16,270	15,324	15,078	15,574	12,957
Admits	13,851	14,034	12,641	12,509	12,717	11,574
Admit rate	87.2	86.3	82.5	83.0	81.7	89.3
Enrolled	1,983	1,657	1,651	1,977	2,164	2,023
Yield rate	14.3	11.8	13.1	15.8	17.0	17.5
ACT composite* (out of 36)	26-31 (30%^{†})	25-30 (37%^{†})	25-30 (60%^{†})	24-29 (79%^{†})	24-30 (81%^{†})	24-29 (89%^{†})
SAT composite* (out of 1600)	1180–1350 (17%^{†})	1200–1350 (13%^{†})	1170–1320 (25%^{†})	1140–1310 (32%^{†})	1150–1320 (32%^{†})	1130–1310 (17%^{†})
* middle 50% range^{†} percentage of first-time freshmen who chose to submit

=== Rankings ===
Academic rankings

National
- Forbes: 114
- U.S. News & World Report: 86
- Washington Monthly: 116
- WSJ/College Pulse: 164

Global
- QS: 701+
- THE: 801–1000
- U.S. News & World Report: 1129

For 2026, Marquette was ranked 88th overall among 436 undergraduate programs for national universities by U.S. News & World Report, tied for 17th in "Best Undergraduate Teaching", tied for 48th for "Most Innovative Schools", and 59th for "Best Value Schools". The magazine also named Marquette tied for the 55th best university for military veterans.

Forbes ranked Marquette 84th among research universities and 114th overall in their 2024-25 list. In 2015, the QS World University Rankings placed Marquette at 701+ overall for universities worldwide.

In its 2020 edition, Princeton Review named Marquette as one of the "Best 386 Colleges in the U.S." and one of the best Midwestern schools. In 2018, Kiplinger's Personal Finance magazine ranked Marquette 75th in the country among the 100 best value private universities.

==== College and program rankings ====
As of 2023, U.S. News & World Report ranked several of the college's graduate degree programs. Marquette's graduate statistics program ranked 86th, its English program was ranked 108th, history at 113th, and psychology at 122nd. Biological sciences at Marquette ranked as tied for 186th overall, chemistry was tied for 136th, and computer science was tied for 152nd. Marquette's undergraduate engineering program was ranked tied for 142 out of 220 schools whose highest degree is a doctorate for 2021. Marquette's part-time MBA program tied for 53rd out of 299 schools for 2023. The Marquette University Law School was ranked 71st out of 196 for 2023, with sub-programs like dispute resolution and legal writing ranking in the top 50.

The Marquette University College of Education's graduate degree was ranked tied for 112th out of 393 for 2021. The physical therapy program was ranked tied for 13th best in the nation as of 2023, and the physician assistant program was ranked tied for 26th. The speech-language pathology program was ranked tied for 55th in the nation. For 2023, U.S. News & World Report listed Marquette's undergraduate nursing program as 29th best in the country, while its graduate nursing-midwifery program was tied for 17th, its masters program at 66th, and its DNP program 78th.

== Student life ==
=== Demographics ===
Student body composition as of May 2, 2022
Race and ethnicity	Total
White	69%
Hispanic	15%
Asian	6%
Black	4%
Other (Note: Other consists of Multiracial Americans & those who prefer to not say.)	4%
Foreign national	2%
Economic diversity
Low-income (Note: The percentage of students who received an income-based federal Pell grant intended for low-income students.)	22%
Affluent (Note: The percentage of students who are a part of the American middle class at the bare minimum.)	78%

Marquette's 11,749 students come from all 50 states, various U.S. territories, and represent more than 65 countries. Of these, 8,293 are undergraduates and 3,456 are graduate and professional students. Twenty-nine percent of undergraduate students are from Wisconsin and thirty-seven percent come from Illinois. Marquette University also has a moderate number of law students and dental students.

The student body is fifty-three percent female and sixty-eight percent identify themselves as Catholic. The retention rate for Marquette is high, with about ninety percent of students returning for their sophomore year.

Marquette administers an Educational Opportunity Program (EOP) – a federally funded TRIO program that is intended to motivate and enable low-income and first-generation students whose parents do not have baccalaureate degrees, to enter and succeed in higher education. Eligible students, who have potential for success and enrolling at Marquette, are provided with a pre-enrollment summer program, a network of supportive services, financial aid assistance, academic counseling, specialized courses, seminars, tutoring, and educational and career counseling.

=== Residence halls ===
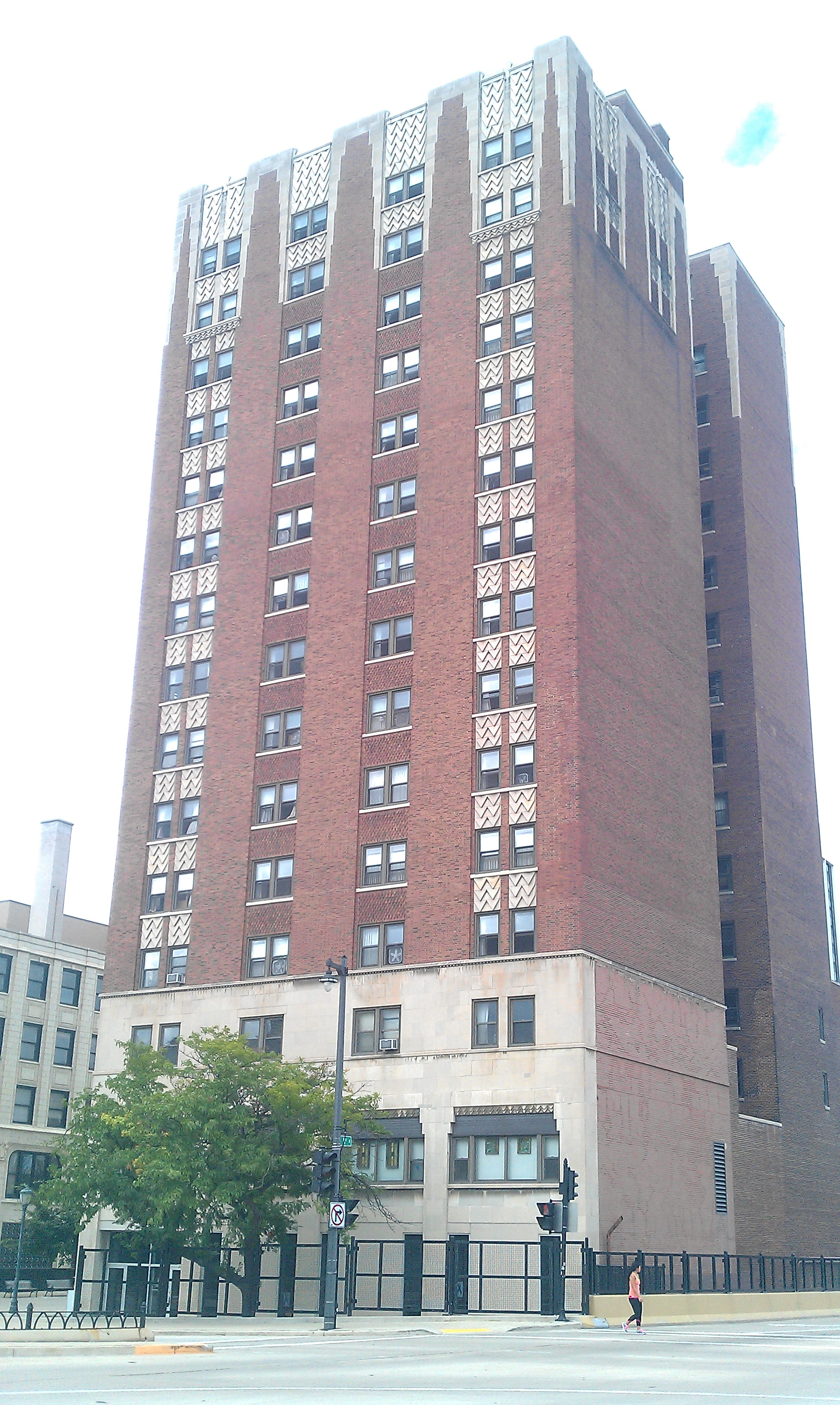
The M. Carpenter Tower

Marquette has absorbed many existing buildings in the area, especially for use as residence halls. Some examples of absorbed buildings include Charles Cobeen Hall, a former hotel, and M. Carpenter Tower, an Art Deco building, both constructed in the 1920s on 11th Street that have been converted into undergraduate residence halls. Glenn Humphrey Hall, a student residence hall that prior to the 2015–16 school year served as a university apartment building, was once the Children's Hospital of Wisconsin. David Straz Tower, formerly the Downtown Milwaukee YMCA, is now a residence hall, recreation center, and administrative office building. Mashuda Hall, a sophomore dorm, was once the Coach House Motor Inn, where The Beatles stayed during their tour in 1964. Abbottsford Hall served as The Abbottsford Hotel until the university purchased it for use as graduate apartments. It was converted into a freshman residence hall prior to the 2005–2006 academic year. The university also purchased the Marquette Apartments complex in 2008, which was remodeled as a sophomore residence hall prior to the 2009–2010 academic year and renamed McCabe Hall. As of the 2015–16 academic year, McCabe Hall is now university apartments. Additionally, the university purchased The Marq, an apartment complex on the west side of campus, in 2017.

Of the nine current student residence halls, only three (O'Donnell Hall, Schroeder Hall, and McCormick Hall) were built by the university. McCormick Hall was razed following the 2018–19 academic year and replaced by Wild Commons, a residence hall for freshman and sophomore students named after former university president Robert Wild. A few weeks after opening for the 2018–19 academic year, Wild requested his name be removed from the building due to his mishandling of accusations of sexual abuse of minors against three Jesuits under his jurisdiction during his time as Provincial Superior of the Chicago Province of the Society of Jesus from 1985 to 1991. It has since been renamed The Commons. Dr. E. J. And Margaret O'Brien Hall has since been erected at the previous site of the McCormick Hall.

=== Clubs and organizations ===
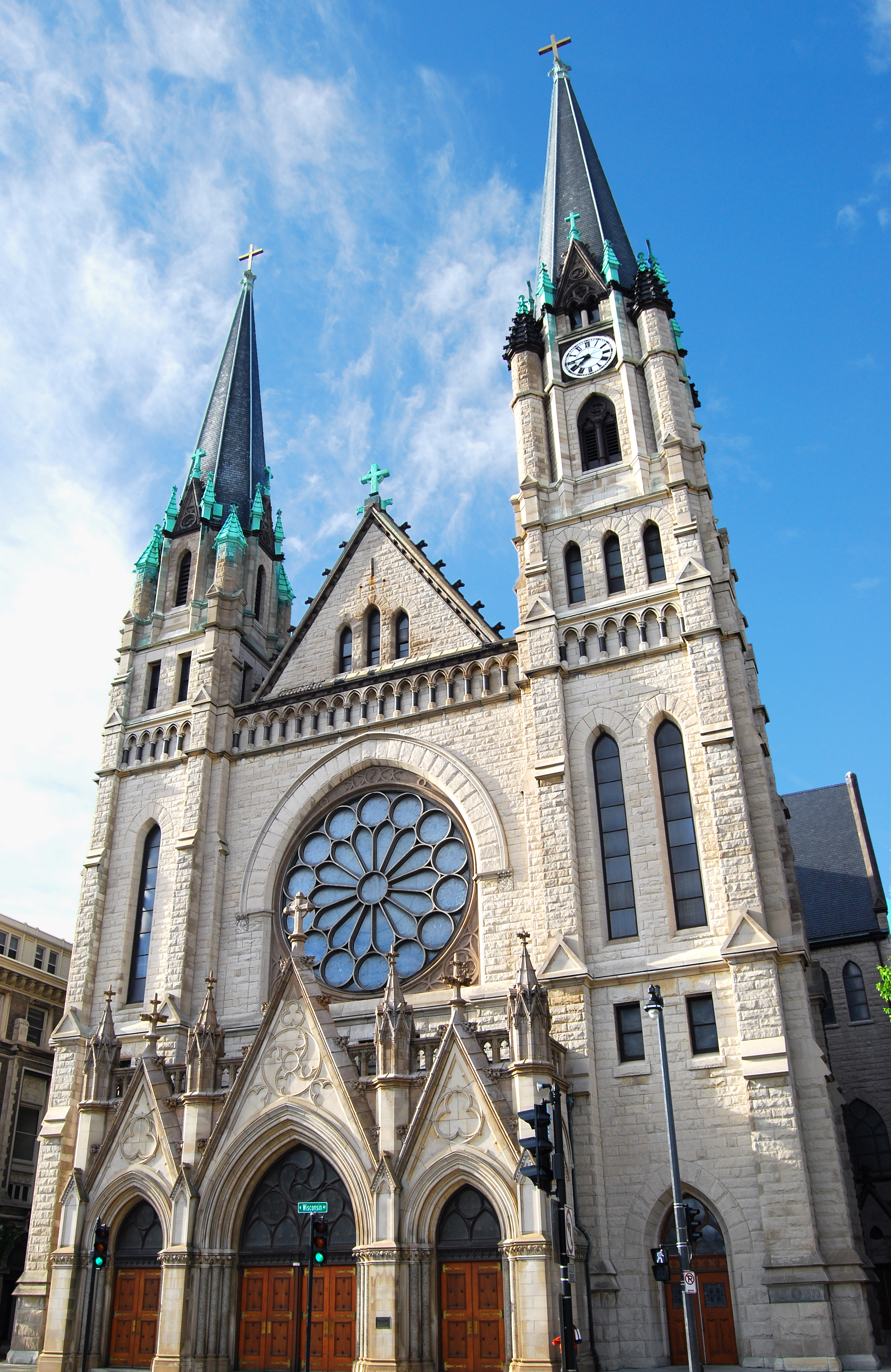
Gesu Church ministers to the downtown campus of Marquette

The university has more than 230 student organizations.

=== Greek life ===
Marquette University is host to 23 Greek organizations and, as of 2009, 10% of the total undergraduate student body is active in Greek life. Sororities are slightly more popular than fraternities, with 11.7% of the female student population involved in Greek life, compared to 7.45% of men. The international engineering sorority Alpha Omega Epsilon was founded at Marquette on November 13, 1983.

=== Performing arts ===
Among the various stage performance groups at Marquette are the Studio 013 Refugees, a student improv comedy group. The Refugees perform free shows throughout the year, including a 12-hour outdoor show on campus, and they provide workshops on improv comedy. The Marquette University Players Society (MUPS) performs in a traditional theater setting.

The Marquette University Chorus, the longest standing choral organization on campus, is a mixed choir of fifty to sixty men and women. There are Men's Choir, Women's Choir, and Chamber Choir. Marquette also has a Gospel Choir and a Liturgical Choir which sings weekly at Mass at Gesu. There are three selective a cappella groups that interested students may try out for: the coed Gold 'n Blues, the all-male Naturals, and the all-female Meladies.

Pure Dance is a lyrical and jazz performance group that helps members pursue their interests in dance and choreography in a collegial setting. Dance, Inc. is a group that allows its members to perform in semester showcases, and styles of dance vary. Hype Dance company is primarily a hip-hop organization that helps to cultivate an interest in hip-hop, contemporary, and jazz style dance.

The Marquette University Symphony Orchestra provides members with an opportunity to develop and share musical talents through participation in a large-group setting. There are several band ensembles that students may join. The Symphonic Band is a group designed for students who wish to continue to make music at the collegiate level, but in a relaxed setting. The newly established Wind Ensemble performs high-level wind band repertoire. There are also two jazz bands. Students who are registered and participate actively in the Symphonic Band and Wind Ensemble have the opportunity to participate in the MU Pep Band.

=== Student media ===
The student newspaper, The Marquette Tribune, founded in 1916, is the official campus newspaper. It is published in print on Tuesdays and Thursdays during the school year. The paper has won regional and national awards for excellence from the Society of Professional Journalists. While most of the 40-person staff are journalism majors, students from varying fields of study write for the paper. A quarterly student-produced magazine, the Marquette Journal, focuses on student life, though formerly the Journal was the school's student literary magazine. Like The Marquette Tribune, the Journal has won awards from the Society of Professional Journalists.

Marquette Radio and MUTV, the student radio and television stations, were launched in the late 1960s to mid-1970s. MUTV airs student-produced programs, including newscasts, sports shows, and entertainment shows. Marquette Radio also airs student-produced shows with focuses on music, sports, news, and talk.

Hilltop was Marquette's university-wide yearbook from 1915 to 1999. The publication, in its 84 years of existence, totaled over 30,000 pages in 82 volumes. Students' color-plate sketches were often highly detailed, humorous or dramatic, and were appropriate examples of contemporary artwork. In April 2006, Marquette's librarians completed a digitally-archived collection of Hilltop.

=== School songs ===
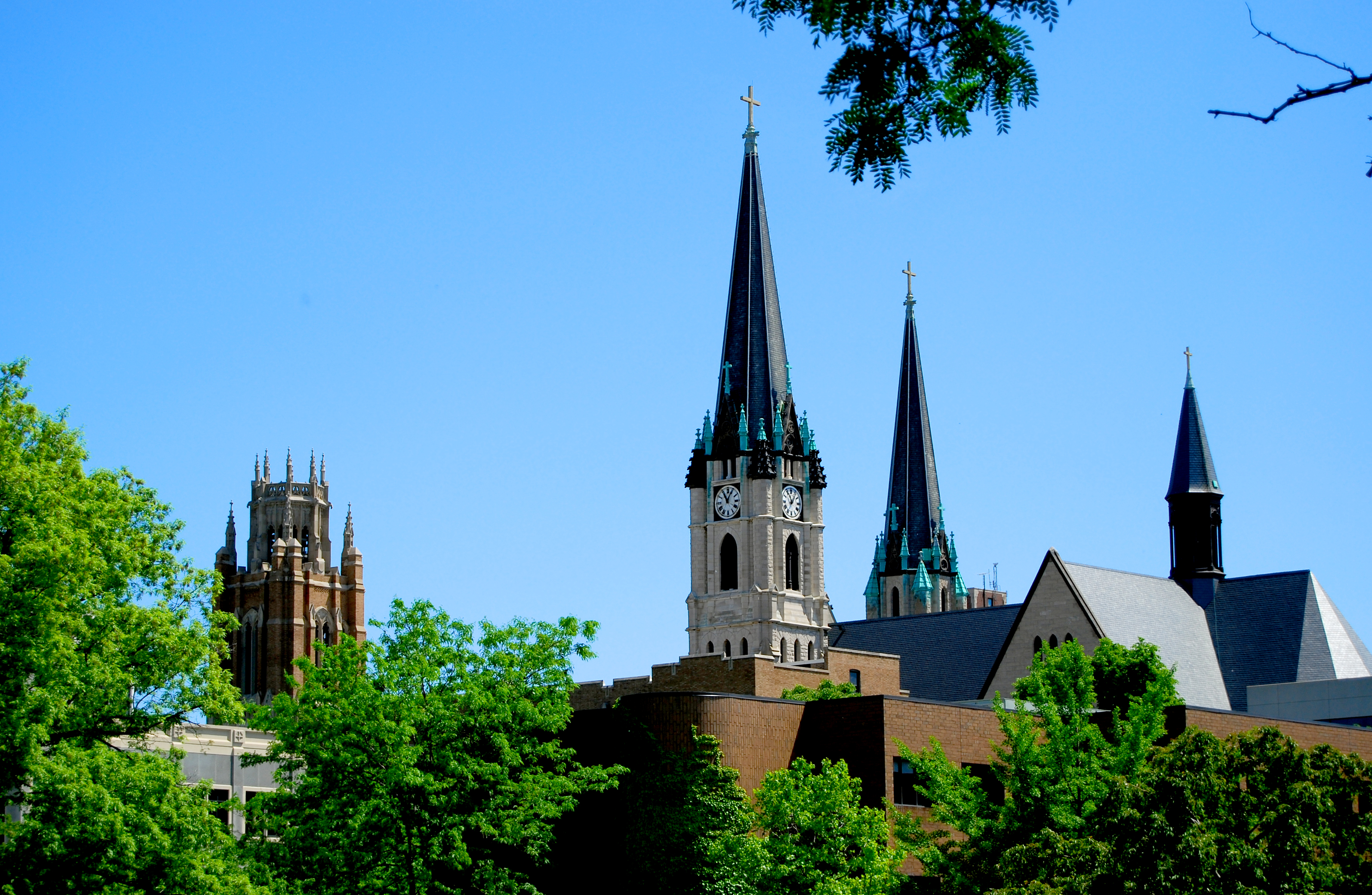
Marquette University spirescape

The school songs, "The Marquette University Anthem" and the "Marquette University Fight Song," are generally sung by students and alumni during basketball games, accompanied by the pep band. The former is also often played using the carillon bells of the Marquette Hall bell tower. "The Marquette University Anthem," as it was originally known, is now referred to almost exclusively as "Hail Alma Mater"/ The tune was written by Liborius Semmann, a music teacher from Wisconsin.

== Athletics ==
The Golden Eagle is Marquette's mascot and the school colors are Marquette blue and Marquette gold, with powder blue incorporated in the 1970s and late 2000s. Marquette is a Division I member of the NCAA and competes in the Big East Conference. The university has 12 varsity teams: basketball, cross-country, men's golf, soccer, track & field, tennis, women's swimming and women's volleyball. In 2013, Marquette began competition in varsity men's and women's lacrosse as a member of the Big East. Football was discontinued by the university after the 1960 season for financial reasons. Since joining the Big East in 2005, the Golden Eagles have won conference championships in men's basketball, men's golf, women's soccer, men's and women's track & field, and men's lacrosse. Marquette's athletic rivals include Syracuse, Cincinnati, DePaul, Louisville, Notre Dame, and Wisconsin. In 2009, because of Marquette, Milwaukee was named by CNN as one of America's great college basketball towns.

=== Mascot and nickname ===
Marquette's intercollegiate athletic teams were the "Warriors" from May 1954 to July 1994, when the nickname was changed to the "Golden Eagles," on the grounds that previous logos had been disrespectful to Native Americans. The football team was known as "Golden Avalanche" through its final season in 1960, and other teams were known as "Warriors," "Blue and Gold," and "Hilltoppers". The Marquette Warriors (the nickname that preceded Golden Eagles) won the NCAA Men's Division I Basketball Championship in 1977. In 2004, Marquette began to consider changing the name back to Warriors, but instead the Board of Trustees changed the nickname to simply "Gold". An intensely negative reaction by students, faculty, alumni, and fans led to yet another series of votes, which eventually pitted "Golden Eagles" against "Hilltoppers". Respondents were told in advance that write-in votes for "Warriors" would not be tabulated, although those results were later released, and "Golden Eagles" was restored in June 2005. In July 2020, Marquette Athletics announced "Iggy" as the name of the Golden Eagle Mascot—named after St. Ignatius of Loyola.

== People ==
=== Alumni ===
As of April 2013, the Marquette University Alumni Association estimated that there were approximately 110,000 living alumni, all of whom automatically belong to the MUAA. Marquette alumni work in a variety of industries and professions. Some have received Pulitzer Prizes, Fulbright Scholarships, Truman Scholarships, Academy Awards, Emmy Awards, and other honors.

Those in the arts and media include comedian Chris Farley, actor Nicholas D'Agosto, actor Danny Pudi, actor Marc Alaimo, composer Paul W. Whear, philosopher Jeffrey T. Nealon, actor Anthony Crivello, journalist Gail Collins, actor Don Ameche, sports columnist Steve Rushin, actor Ron Sheridan, Chicago White Sox broadcaster Len Kasper, Academy Award-winning production designer Adam Stockhausen, and Emmy Award-winning costume designer Erin Slattery-Black.

Marquette alumni in the business world include former Sears chairman Edward Brennan, Texas Instruments co-founder Patrick E. Haggerty, and Mary Houghton, founder of ShoreBank. Marcus Lemonis, CEO of Camping World, Good Sam Enterprises, obtained his bachelor's degree at Marquette.

Those involved in politics include U.S. Senator Joseph McCarthy; first Latino member of the Wisconsin State Assembly Pedro Colón; U.S. Representative Gwen Moore; Annette Ziegler, a justice of the Wisconsin Supreme Court; Stephen Murphy III, a District Court Judge for the Eastern District of Michigan; U.S. Ambassadors John F. Tefft and Kenneth M. Quinn; two governors of Guam, Felix and Carlos Camacho; Governor of the Northern Mariana Islands Froilan Tenorio; Senator of Guam Tony Palomo. Former Governor of Wisconsin Scott Walker attended Marquette in the 1980s, but left during his senior year.

Notable athletes who attended Marquette include professional basketball players Dwyane Wade, Jimmy Butler, Maurice Lucas, Butch Lee, Lloyd Walton, George Thompson, Jim Chones, Juan Toscano-Anderson, Jae Crowder, Maurice "Bo" Ellis, Don Kojis, Wesley Matthews, Allie McGuire, Dean Meminger, and Tony Miller. The current Milwaukee Bucks coach Glenn "Doc" Rivers and former college basketball coach Rick Majerus both graduated from the school. George Andrie was a professional football defensive end in the National Football League (NFL) for the Dallas Cowboys. Olympic medalists include track and field athletes Ralph Metcalfe, Ken Wiesner, John Bennett, speedskater Brian Hansen, and basketball player Frank McCabe.

Marquette alumni in science include NASA Dryden director John A. Manke, endocrinologist George Delahunty, botanist Rose Agnes Greenwell, plastic surgeon Donald Laub, biomedical engineer Robert B. Pinter, immunologist Carol Pontzer, and molecular biologist Jeffery D. Molkentin. Economist and writer Michael R. Strain also graduated from Marquette.

=== Faculty ===
The following is a list of notable members of the Marquette University faculty, both past and present:

- Les Aspin, professor of political science, 1969–1971; Center for Government renamed in his honor
- Michel René Barnes, associate professor of historical theology
- Daniel D. Blinka, law professor and historian
- Virgil Blum, professor of political science
- Chris Bury, journalism instructor, 1979–80; Nightline correspondent
- Margaret Callahan, Dean of the College of Nursing
- Tom Colbert, Assistant Dean of the Marquette Law School (1982–1984), Justice of the Oklahoma Supreme Court (2004–)
- Richard Dickson Cudahy, Judge of the U.S. Court of Appeals
- John A. Decker, Chief Judge of the Wisconsin Court of Appeals
- Paddy Driscoll, NFL player and head coach, MLB player
- Arpad Elo, professor of physics, author of The Rating of Chessplayers, Past and Present
- Stephen M. Engel, professor of political science
- Russ Feingold, U.S. Senator, visiting professor in 2011
- Luis Feliciano, Professional Boxer, Super Lightweight Champion
- Janine P. Geske, Justice of the Wisconsin Supreme Court
- Alexander Golitzen, professor of theology, Bishop of Toledo and the Bulgarian Diocese (OCA)
- Arthur Guepe, head coach of the Virginia Cavaliers and Vanderbilt Commodores football teams, Commissioner of the Ohio Valley Conference
- Jack Harbaugh, associate athletic director
- Joseph D. Kearney, Dean of the Law School
- Alice Beck Kehoe, professor emeritus of anthropology
- Joan F. Kessler, Judge of the Wisconsin Court of Appeals
- Jean-Pierre LaFouge, Associate Professor of French
- Timothy R. Lannon, President of Creighton University
- Frank Lazarus, President of the University of Dallas
- William Markowitz, professor of physics (1966–1972)
- John C. McAdams, associate professor of political science
- David Merkow, golfer and golf coach
- Frank Murray, member of the College Football Hall of Fame
- Kazuo Nakamoto, the first Wehr distinguished professor of chemistry.
- Rev. John E. Naus, various roles
- George New, artist
- Andrei Orlov, associate professor of Christian origins
- Benjamin Percy, visiting assistant professor, author (2004–2007)
- Joseph Perry, Auxiliary Bishop of the Archdiocese of Chicago
- Michael Phayer, historian
- Francis Paul Prucha, professor emeritus of history
- Rajendra Rathore, chemist
- George Reedy, Dean of the Journalism School
- James Robb, professor of philosophy
- James A. Rutkowski, Wisconsin State Assemblyman
- John P. Schlegel, President of Creighton University
- Charles B. Schudson, Judge of the Wisconsin Court of Appeals
- Bud Selig, Commissioner of Major League Baseball and adjunct faculty member in the Law School
- Nancy Snow, professor of philosophy
- Thomas E. Stidham, NFL assistant coach
- Athan G. Theoharis, professor emeritus of history
- Albert G. Thompson
- Abraham J. Twerski, psychiatrist specializing in substance abuse
- Barbara Ulichny, Wisconsin State Senator
- Francis Wade, professor of philosophy
- Margaret Urban Walker, professor of philosophy
- Benjamin Wiker, ethicist
- Michael Zimmer, computer science

=== University presidents ===
- 1881–1882: Joseph F. Rigge
- 1882–1884: Isidore J. Boudreaux
- 1884–1887: Thomas S. Fitzgerald
- 1887–1889: Stanislaus P. La Lumiere
- 1889–1891: Joseph Grimmelsman
- 1891–1892: Rudolph J. Meyer
- 1892–1893: Victor Plutten
- 1893–1898: Leopold Bushard
- 1898–1900: William B. Rogers
- 1900–1908: Alexander J. Burrowes
- 1908–1911: James McCabe
- 1911–1915: Joseph Grimmelsman
- 1915–1922: Herbert C. Noonan
- 1922–1928: Albert C. Fox
- 1928–1936: William M. Magee
- 1935–1944: Raphael C. McCarthy
- 1944–1948: Peter A. Brooks
- 1948–1962: Edward J. O'Donnell
- 1962–1965: William F. Kelley
- 1965–1990: John P. Raynor
- 1990–1996: Albert J. DiUlio
- 1996–2011: Robert A. Wild
- 2011–2013: Scott R. Pilarz
- 2013–2014: Robert A. Wild (interim)
- 2014–2024: Michael Lovell
- 2024–Present: Kimo Ah Yun

== See also ==
- List of Jesuit sites
- List of Jesuit educational institutions
