= 2012 Texas Longhorns volleyball team =

American college volleyball season

2012 Texas Longhorns women's volleyball

NCAA National Champion Big 12 Conference Champion
- Conference: Big 12 Conference

Ranking
- Coaches: No. 1
- Record: 29–4 (15–1 Big 12)
- Head coach: Jerritt Elliott (12th season)
- Assistant coaches: Salima Rockwell (4th season); Erik Sullivan (2nd season)
- Captains: Hannah Allison; Sha'Dare McNeal; Bailey Webster
- Home arena: Gregory Gym

2012 Big 12 Conference volleyball standings
	Conf.				Overall
Team	W		L	PCT	W		L	PCT
No. 1 Texas ‍†‍‍^{y}	15	–	1	.938	29	–	4	.879
No. 14 Iowa State ‍‍‍^{y}	13	–	3	.813	22	–	8	.733
Kansas ‍‍‍^{y}	12	–	4	.750	26	–	7	.788
Oklahoma ‍‍‍^{y}	10	–	6	.625	22	–	11	.667
No. 25 Kansas State ‍‍‍^{y}	8	–	8	.500	21	–	9	.700
Baylor ‍‍‍	7	–	9	.438	20	–	12	.625
TCU ‍‍‍	4	–	12	.250	15	–	14	.517
Texas Tech ‍‍‍	3	–	13	.188	14	–	18	.438
West Virginia ‍‍‍	0	–	16	.000	8	–	22	.267
† – Conference champion y- Invited to the NCAA Volleyball Tournament; As of December 18, 2014; Rankings from AVCA

The 2012 Texas Longhorns volleyball team represented the University of Texas in the 2012 NCAA Division I women's volleyball season. The Texas Longhorns women's volleyball team, led by 12th year head coach Jerritt Elliott, played their home games at Gregory Gymnasium. The Longhorns were members of the Big 12.

The Longhorns won the Big 12 Championship and defeated Oregon 3–0 to win the team's 2nd NCAA Title and 3rd National Title overall.

== Roster ==
2012 Texas Longhorns roster
Libero: 6 Kat Brooks – Freshman; 16 Sarah (Palmer) Baldwin – Junior; 22 Megan Futch – Junior; Setter: 12 Hannah Allison – Junior; Utility: 3 Madelyn Hutson – Sophomore; 14 Sha'Dare McNeal – Senior	Middle blockers: 1 Khat Bell – Sophomore; 5 Molly McCage – Freshman; 15 Sara Hattis – Freshman	Outside hitters: 7 Nicole Dalton – Freshman; 10 Haley Eckerman – Sophomore; 23 Bailey Webster – Junior

== Schedule ==
Date Time	Opponent	Rank	Arena City (Tournament)	Score	Attendance	Record (Big 12 Record)	Box Score Recap
August 24; 6:00 PM	LSU	#2	Gregory Gymnasium; Austin, TX (26 West Longhorn Classic)	W 3–0 (25–12, 25–19, 25–19)	2,107	1–0	Box Score; Recap
August 25; 11:30 AM	Cal Poly	#2	Gergory Gym; Austin, TX (26 West Longhorn Classic)	W 3–0 (25–17, 25–16, 25–20)	1,603	2–0	Box Score; Recap
August 25; 7:00 PM	#19 San Diego	#2	Gergory Gym; Austin, TX (26 West Longhorn Classic)	W 3–0 (25–21, 25–19, 25–12)	2,317	3–0	Box Score; Recap
August 29; 5:30 PM	at West Virginia*	#2	WVU Coliseum; Morgantown, WV	W 3–0 (25–15, 25–18, 25–16)		4–0 (1–0)	Box Score; Recap
August 31; 3:30 PM	vs. #18 Florida	#2	Rec Hall; University Park, PA (Nike Big Four Volleyball Classic)	W 3–0 (29–27, 25–22, 26–24)		5–0	Box Score; Recap
September 1; 6:00 PM	at #4 Penn State	#2	Rec Hall; University Park, PA (Nike Big Four Volleyball Classic)	L 0–3 (22–25, 21–25, 22–25)	4,809	5–1	Box Score; Recap
September 6; 6:30 PM	#14 Minnesota	#4	Gergory Gym; Austin, TX	L 1–3 (22–25, 13–25, 29–27, 27–29)	2,295	5–2	Box Score; Recap
September 7; 6:30 PM	#14 Minnesota	#4	Gergory Gym; Austin, TX	W 3–1 (25–20, 20–25, 25–22, 25–21)	2,750	6–2	Box Score; Recap
September 14; 6:00 PM	#23 Illinois	#6	Gergory Gym; Austin, TX (Time Warner Cable Invitational)	L 2–3 (25–18, 21–25, 21–25, 25–19, 13–15)	2,116	6–3	Box Score; Recap
September 15; 11:30 AM	Cincinnati	#6	Gergory Gym; Austin, TX (Time Warner Cable Invitational)	W 3–0 (30–28, 28–26, 25–11)	2,070	7–3	Box Score; Recap
September 15; 4:00 PM	UCF	#6	Gergory Gym; Austin, TX (Time Warner Cable Invitational)	W 3–0 (25–14, 25–14, 25–13)	2,070	8–3	Box Score; Recap
September 22; 5:00 PM	Oklahoma*	#9	Gergory Gym; Austin, TX	W 3–0 (25–18, 25–14, 25–10)	4,171	9–3 (2–0)	Box Score; Recap
September 25; 7:00 PM	at Baylor*	#9	Ferrell Center; Waco, TX	W 3–0 (25–19, 25–18, 25–22)	1,214	10–3 (3–0)	Box Score; Recap
September 29; 2:00 PM	at Texas Tech*	#9	United Spirit Arena; Lubbock, TX	W 3–0 (25–16, 25–23, 25–22)	917	11–3 (4–0)	Box Score; Recap
October 3; 7:00 PM	TCU*	#9	Gergory Gym; Austin, TX	W 3–0 (25–19, 25–21, 25–17)	2,652	12–3 (5–0)	Box Score; Recap
October 6; 7:00 PM	at #14 Kansas State*	#9	Ahearn Field House; Manhattan, KS	W 3–0 (25–17, 30–28, 25–15)	3,044	13–3 (6–0)	Box Score; Recap
October 8; 6:00 PM	at #15 Louisville	#9	KFC Yum! Center; Louisville, KY	W 3–2 (21–25, 25–18, 21–25, 26–24, 15–10)	4,163	14–3	Box Score; Recap
October 12; 7:30 PM	#21 Kansas*	#9	Gergory Gym; Austin, TX	W 3–0 (25–14, 25–22, 26–24)	2,280	15–3 (7–0)	Box Score; Recap
October 17; 7:00 PM	#22 Iowa State*	#8	Gergory Gym; Austin, TX	W 3–2 (26–28, 18–25, 25–17, 25–17, 15–9)	2,020	16–3 (8–0)	Box Score; Recap
October 24; 7:00 PM	Baylor*	#8	Gergory Gym; Austin, TX	W 3–1 (25–18, 20–25, 25–9, 25–22)	2,424	17–3 (9–0)	Box Score; Recap
October 28; 2:00 PM	at Oklahoma*	#8	McCasland Field House; Norman, OK	W 3–0 (25–23, 25–10, 25–8)	1,321	18–3 (10–0)	Box Score; Recap
October 31; 7:00 PM	at TCU*	#7	University Rec Center; Fort Worth, TX	W 3–0 (25–17, 25–16, 25–17)	1,712	19–3 (11–0)	Box Score; Recap
November 2; 7:00 PM	#16 Kansas State*	#7	Gergory Gym; Austin, TX	W 3–0 (25–18, 25–22, 25–19)	2,923	20–3 (12–0)	Box Score; Recap
November 10; 6:30 PM	at #23 Kansas*	#3	Horejsi Center; Lawrence, KS	W 3–2 (20–25, 25–15, 22–25, 25–16, 15–12)	1,300	21–3 (13–0)	Box Score; Recap
November 14; 7:00 PM	Texas Tech*	#3	Gergory Gym; Austin, TX	W 3–0 (25–16, 25–20, 25–17)	2,514	22–3 (14–0)	Box Score; Recap
November 17; 1:00 PM	West Virginia*	#3	Gergory Gym; Austin, TX	W 3–0 (25–14, 25–17, 25–16)	2,954	23–3 (15–0)	Box Score; Recap
November 24; 6:30 PM	at #18 Iowa State*	#3	Hilton Coliseum; Ames, IA	L 2–3 (25–23, 19–25, 21–25, 25–15, 13–15)	4,396	23–4 (15–1)	Box Score; Recap
2012 NCAA Tournament
November 29; 7:00 PM	Colgate	#3	Gergory Gym; Austin, TX (NCAA first round)	W 3–0 (25–4, 25–11, 25–15)	2,145	24–4	Box Score; Recap
November 30; 7:00 PM	Texas A&M (Lone Star Showdown)	#3	Gergory Gym; Austin, TX (NCAA second round)	W 3–1 (25–16, 19–25, 25–19, 25–18)	3,419	25–4	Box Score; Recap
December 7; 7:00 PM	#14 Florida	#3	Gergory Gym; Austin, TX (NCAA regional semifinal)	W 3–0 (25–22, 26–24, 25–17)	3,839	26–4	Box Score; Recap
December 8; 8:00 PM	#6 USC	#3	Gergory Gym; Austin, TX (NCAA Regional final)	W 3–0 (25–19, 25–22, 25–14)	4,171	27–4	Box Score; Recap
December 13; 6:00 PM	vs. Michigan	#3	KFC Yum! Center; Louisville, KY (NCAA Semifinal)	W 3–2 (25–11, 21–25, 23–25, 25–12, 15–11)		28–4	Box Score; Recap
December 15; 6:00 PM	vs. #5 Oregon	#3	KFC Yum! Center; Louisville, KY (NCAA Final)	W 3–0 (25–11, 26–24, 25–19)	16,448	29–4	Box Score; Recap
* Indicates Conference Opponent, Times listed are Central Time Zone, Source
