= Kelly Sheffield =

American college volleyball coach

Current position
- Title: Head coach
- Team: Wisconsin
- Conference: Big Ten
- Record: 368–80 (.821)

Biographical details
- Born: July 14, 1970 (age 56); Muncie, Indiana
- Education: Ball State

Coaching career (HC unless noted)
- 1997: Houston (assistant)
- 1998–1999: Virginia (assistant)
- 2000: Clemson (assistant)
- 2001–2007: Albany
- 2008–2012: Dayton
- 2013–present: Wisconsin

Head coaching record
- Overall: 641–193 (.769)

Accomplishments and honors

Championships
- NCAA national champions (2021) 3x America East regular season champions (2004–2006); 4x Atlantic 10 regular season champions (2009–2012) 5x Big Ten regular season champions (2014, 2019, 2020, 2021, 2022)

Awards
- Zimbrick Honda Madison Sportsman of the Year (2014) 3x Big Ten Coach of the Year (2014, 2019, 2022); Volleyball Magazine National Coach of the Year (2013); 3x Atlantic 10 Coach of the Year (2010–2012); 2x America East Coach of the Year (2004, 2006); 5x AVCA Northeast Region Coach of the Year (2010, 2012, 2014, 2019, 2022, 2023) 1x AVCA North Region Coach of the Year (2025)

Kelly Patrick Sheffield (born July 14, 1970) is an American college volleyball coach and the current head coach for the women's volleyball team at the University of Wisconsin. He is also a former head coach of Dayton and Albany. In his rookie season coaching the Badgers' Sheffield took his team to the NCAA championship match, he is one of only three head coaches to lead their teams to the final match in their first seasons. The 12th-seeded Badgers upset the No. 1 seeded and defending national champion Texas Longhorns only to fall in the championship match to No. 2 Penn State in the 2013 NCAA championships. In 2021, Sheffield coached the Badgers to the program's first ever National Championship, defeating No. 10 Nebraska in 5 sets.

== Head coaching record ==
On January 20, 2017, the University of Wisconsin announced that Sheffield had signed a contract extension through January 31, 2022.

Record table
Season	Team	Overall	Conference	Standing	Postseason
Albany Great Danes (America East Conference) (2001–2007)
2001	Albany	4–20	1–13	8th	
2002	Albany	16–15	5–7	4th	
2003	Albany	24–10	9–5	4th	
2004	Albany	27–7	13–1	1st	NCAA first round
2005	Albany	28–4	11–1	1st	
2006	Albany	19–13	10–2	1st	NCAA first round
2007	Albany	24–10	9–4	2nd	NCAA second round
Albany:		142–79 (.643)	58–33 (.637)		
Dayton Flyers (Atlantic 10 Conference) (2008–2012)
2008	Dayton	21–13	11–2	2nd	NCAA first round
2009	Dayton	30–4	14–1	1st	NCAA second round
2010	Dayton	28–4	15–0	1st	NCAA second round
2011	Dayton	25–7	14–1	1st	NCAA first round
2012	Dayton	27–5	14–0	1st	NCAA second round
Dayton:		131–33 (.799)	68–4 (.944)		
Wisconsin Badgers (Big Ten Conference) (2013–Present)
2013	Wisconsin	28–10	12–8	T-4th	NCAA National runner-up
2014	Wisconsin	31–3	19–1	1st	NCAA Regional final
2015	Wisconsin	26–7	16–4	3rd	NCAA regional semifinal
2016	Wisconsin	28–5	17–3	2nd	NCAA Regional final
2017	Wisconsin	22–10	11–9	T–7th	NCAA regional semifinal
2018	Wisconsin	25–7	15–5	T–4th	NCAA Regional final
2019	Wisconsin	27–7	18–2	1st	NCAA National runner-up
2020	Wisconsin	18–1	15–0	1st	NCAA National semifinal
2021	Wisconsin	31–3	17–3	1st	NCAA Champions
2022	Wisconsin	28–4	19–1	1st	NCAA Regional final
2023	Wisconsin	30–4	17–3	2nd	NCAA National semifinal
2024	Wisconsin	26–7	17–3	3rd	NCAA Regional final
2025	Wisconsin	28–5	17–3	2nd	NCAA National semifinal
2026	Wisconsin	20–7	14–3	T–2nd	TBD
Wisconsin:		368–80 (.821)	224–48 (.824)		
Total:		641–193 (.769)			
National champion Postseason invitational champion Conference regular season champion Conference regular season and conference tournament champion Division regular season champion Division regular season and conference tournament champion Conference tournament champion

== AVCA All-Americans coached ==
*Denotes AVCA National Player of the Year

=== First Team ===
- Lauren Carlini – 2014, 2015, 2016 (Wisconsin)
- Dana Rettke – 2017, 2018, 2019, 2020, 2021* (Wisconsin)
- Sydney Hilley – 2019, 2020, 2021 (Wisconsin)
- Sarah Franklin – 2023*, 2024 (Wisconsin)
- Mimi Colyer - 2025 (Wisconsin)

=== Second Team ===
- Lindsay Fletemier – 2010 (Dayton)
- Samantha Selsky – 2012 (Dayton)
- Lauren Carlini – 2013 (Wisconsin)
- Taylor Morey – 2014 (Wisconsin)
- Courtney Thomas – 2014 (Wisconsin)
- Haleigh Nelson – 2015, 2016 (Wisconsin)
- Sydney Hilley – 2018 (Wisconsin)
- Molly Haggerty – 2019 (Wisconsin)
- Lauren Barnes – 2020, 2021 (Wisconsin)
- Anna Smrek – 2023 (Wisconsin)

=== Third Team ===
- Lyndsay Fletemier – 2009 (Dayton)
- Megan Campbell – 2011 (Dayton)
- Tionna Williams – 2016 (Wisconsin)
- Molly Haggerty – 2016 (Wisconsin)
- Madison Duello – 2018 (Wisconsin)
- Devyn Robinson – 2020, 2022 (Wisconsin)
- Danielle Hart – 2022 (Wisconsin)
- Sarah Franklin – 2022 (Wisconsin)
- Carter Booth – 2023, 2025 (Wisconsin)
- Charlie Fuerbringer – 2024 (Wisconsin)

=== Honorable Mention ===
- Blair Buchanan – 2004, 2005 (Albany)
- Lindsay Fletemier – 2008 (Dayton)
- Jessica Yanz – 2010 (Dayton)
- Samantha Selksy – 2011 (Dayton)
- Rachel Krabacher – 2011, 2012 (Dayton)
- Megan Campbell – 2012 (Dayton)
- Ellen Chapman – 2013 (Wisconsin)
- Dominique Thompson – 2014 (Wisconsin)
- Haleigh Nelson – 2014 (Wisconsin)
- Taylor Morey – 2015 (Wisconsin)
- Tionna Williams – 2015, 2017 (Wisconsin)
- Tiffany Clark – 2018 (Wisconsin)
- Grace Loberg – 2019, 2020 (Wisconsin)
- Molly Haggerty – 2020 (Wisconsin)
- Devyn Robinson – 2023 (Wisconsin)

== Coaching awards ==
- 2025 AVCA North Region Coach of the Year
- 2023 AVCA Northeast Region Coach of the Year
- 2022 Big Ten Coach of the Year
- 2022 AVCA Northeast Region Coach of the Year
- 2019 AVCA Northeast Region Coach of the Year
- 2019 Big Ten Coach of the Year
- 2014 Zimbrick Honda Madison Sportsman of the Year
- 2014 Big Ten Coach of the Year
- 2013 Volleyball Magazine National Coach of the Year
- 2014 AVCA Northeast Region Coach of the Year
- 2012 AVCA Northeast Region Coach of the Year
- 2012 Atlantic 10 Coach of the Year
- 2011 Atlantic 10 Coach of the Year
- 2010 AVCA Northeast Region Coach of the Year
- 2010 Atlantic 10 Coach of the Year
- 2006 America East Coach of the Year
- 2004 America East Coach of the Year
