= Peter Waite =

Peter Waite may refer to:

- Peter Waite (philanthropist) (1834–1922), South Australian pastoralist and public benefactor
- P. B. Waite (Peter Busby Waite, 1922–2020), Canadian historian
- Pete Waite, American volleyball coach
