= Northern Illinois Huskies women's volleyball =

American college women's volleyball team

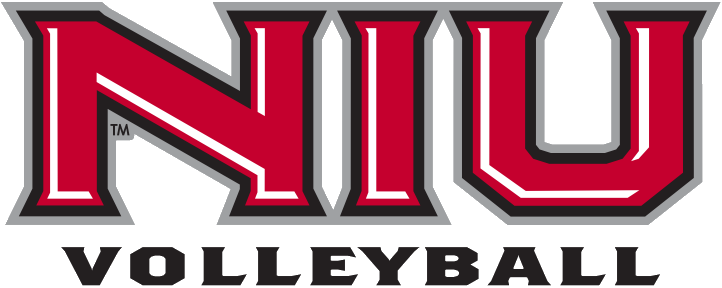
- Founded: 1970
- University: Northern Illinois University
- Head coach: Sondra D'Amore (3rd season)
- Conference: MAC
- Location: DeKalb, Illinois, US
- Home arena: NIU Convocation Center (capacity: 10,000)
- Nickname: Huskies
- Colors: Cardinal and black

AIAW/NCAA tournament appearance
- 1993, 1996, 1997, 1998, 2001, 2011, 2016

Conference tournament champion
- 1988, 1991 (NSC); 1992, 1993 (Mid-Con); 1996 (MCC); 1997, 2001, 2016 (MAC)

Conference regular season champion
- 1988, 1990 (NSC); 1992, 1993 (Mid-Con); 1995, 1996 (MCC); 1997, 1998, 2001, 2011, 2015, 2016 (MAC)

The Northern Illinois Huskies women's volleyball team is the college volleyball team that represent Northern Illinois University (NIU) in DeKalb, Illinois, United States. The school's team currently competes in the Mid-American Conference (MAC). The Huskies are coached by Ray Gooden.

NIU women's volleyball started playing in 1970 and has appeared in the NCAA tournament seven times (1993, 1996, 1997, 1998, 2001, 2011, 2016), and in the National Invitational Volleyball Championship (NIVC) three times (1991, 1992, 1994).

== Season-by-season records ==
Statistics overview
Season	Coach	Overall	Conference	Standing	Postseason
Lou Jean Moyer (Independent) (1970–1974)
1970	Lou Jean Moyer	13-6			
1971	Lou Jean Moyer	12-4			
1972	Lou Jean Moyer	16-6			
1973	Lou Jean Moyer	26-10			
1974	Lou Jean Moyer	8–17			
Lou Jean Moyer:		75-43			
Debbie Brue (Independent) (1975–1981)
1975	Debbie Brue	15-12			
1976	Debbie Brue	16-8			
1977	Debbie Brue	13-22-3			
1978	Debbie Brue	21-11-1			
1979	Debbie Brue	19-22-1			
1980	Debbie Brue	20–23			
1981	Debbie Brue	29-28			
Debbie Brue:		133-126-5			
Herb Summers (MAC) (1982–1985)
1982	Herb Summers	20-19	1–7	T-9th	
1983	Herb Summers	16-13	11-7	T-4th	
1984	Herb Summers	20-13	13-5	3rd	
1985	Herb Summers	18-15	12-6	4th	
Herb Summers (Independent) (1986–1986)
1986	Herb Summers	11–22			
Herb Summers (NSC) (1987–1987)
1987	Herb Summers	19-16	4-1	2nd	
Herb Summers:		104-98	41-26		
Pete Waite (NSC) (1988–1991)
1988	Pete Waite	22-8	6-1	T-1st	
1989	Pete Waite	9–20	2–4	5th	
1990	Pete Waite	26-8	8-1	1st	
1991	Pete Waite	27-9	4-2	2nd	NIVC 2-2
Pete Waite (Mid-Con) (1992–1993)
1992	Pete Waite	33-6	16-0	1st	NIVC 4-1
1993	Pete Waite	29-6	18-0	1st	NCAA 2nd Round
Pete Waite (MCC) (1994–1996)
1994	Pete Waite	23-11	8-2	T-2nd	NIVC 2-2
1995	Pete Waite	16-15	13-1	1st	
1996	Pete Waite	27-8	12-2	1st	NCAA 1st Round
Pete Waite (MAC) (1997–1998)
1997	Pete Waite	27-4	14-2	T-1st (West)	NCAA 2nd Round
1998	Pete Waite	27-7	15-3	T-1st (West)	NCAA 2nd Round
Pete Waite:		266-102	116-18		
Todd Kress (MAC) (1999–2001)
1999	Todd Kress	10–15	7–11	3rd (West)	
2000	Todd Kress	24-9	12-6	3rd (West)	
2001	Todd Kress	24-6	15-3	1st (West)	NCAA 1st Round
Todd Kress:		58-30	34-20		
Ray Gooden (MAC) (2002–present)
2002	Ray Gooden	13–17	6–12	5th (West)	
2003	Ray Gooden	20-11	8-8	T-3rd (West)	
2004	Ray Gooden	14–19	8-8	T-4th (West)	
2005	Ray Gooden	16–17	7–9	5th (West)	
2006	Ray Gooden	20-9	13-3	1st (West)	
2007	Ray Gooden	14–18	8–9	4th (West)	
2008	Ray Gooden	18-14	9-7	3rd (West)	
2009	Ray Gooden	14–16	8-8	T-2nd (West)	
2010	Ray Gooden	27-8	11-5	3rd (West)	
2011	Ray Gooden	28-7	14-2	1st	NCAA 1st Round
2012	Ray Gooden	21-15	10-6	2nd (West)	
2013	Ray Gooden	19-13	10-6	3rd (West)	
2014	Ray Gooden	21-10	14-2	1st (West)	
2015	Ray Gooden	18-11	14-2	1st	
2016	Ray Gooden	25-6	15-1	1st	NCAA 1st Round
2017	Ray Gooden	8-23	7-9	5th (West)	
2018	Ray Gooden	11-21	9-7	3rd (West)	
2019	Ray Gooden	8-22	5-11	5th (West)	
2020-2021	Ray Gooden	8-14	8-14	5th (West)	
2021	Ray Gooden	16-13	10-8	4th (West)	
2022	Ray Gooden	17-11	10-8	5th (West)	
Ray Gooden:		339-283	194-137		
Sondra D’Amore (MAC) (2023–2025)
2023	Sondra Parys	8-22	6-12	5th (West)	
2024	Sondra D’Amore	4-24	2-16	11th	
2025	Sondra D’Amore	13-14	6-12	T-8th	
Sondra D’Amore (Horizon League) (2026–present)
Sondra D’Amore:		25-60	14-40		
Total:		974-683-5			
National champion Postseason invitational champion Conference regular season champion Conference regular season and conference tournament champion Division regular season champion Division regular season and conference tournament champion Conference tournament champion

- Source: NIU Volleyball Record Book

== Division I postseason results ==
=== NCAA tournament ===
The Huskies have appeared in seven NCAA tournaments. Their combined record is 3–7.

Year	Region	Round	Opponent	Result	NIU Head Coach
1993	Mideast	First round Second round	Illinois State (3) Penn State	W 3–0; L 3–0	Pete Waite
1996	Pacific	First round	UC-Santa Barbara	L 3–2	Pete Waite
1997	East	First round Second round	Villanova (1) Penn State	W 3–2; L 3–0	Pete Waite
1998	University Park	First round Second round	Florida State (1) Louisville	W 3–1; L 3–1	Pete Waite
2001	Long Beach	First round	(16) Northern Iowa	L 3–0	Todd Kress
2011	Minneapolis	First round	Miami (FL)	L 3–1	Ray Gooden
2016	Minneapolis	First round	(15) Missouri	L 3–0	Ray Gooden

=== National Invitation Championship ===
The Huskies appeared in three National Invitational Volleyball Championships (NIVC). Their combined record is 8–5.

Year	Round	Opponent	Result	NIU Head Coach
1991	First round Second round Consolation; Consolation	Appalachian State; Santa Clara; William & Mary; Villanova	W 3–0; L 3–0; L 3-1; W 3–0	Pete Waite
1992	First round Second round Quarterfinals; Semifinals; Finals	Loyola Marymount; George Washington; Murray State; SW Missouri State; Washington State	W 3–2; W 3–1; W 3–0; W 3–0; L 3–0	Pete Waite
1994	First round Second round Consolation; Consolation	Delaware; San Diego; South Carolina; Miami (OH)	W 3–0; L 3–0; W 3–0; L 3-1	Pete Waite

== Coaching staff ==
Former NIU volleyball head coach Ray Gooden is a five-time MAC coach of the year, has led the Huskies to three MAC Championships and two NCAA tournament appearances.

- Sondra D'Amore – Head Coach
- Ross Kessler – Assistant Coach
- Mackenzie Rombach – Assistant Coach
- Morgan Sherwin – Assistant Coach/Director of Operations

== Honors ==
=== All-Americans ===
NIU volleyball has had four players named to the AVCA All-America teams.

Year	Player	Team
2006	Kate McCullagh	Honorable mention
2010	Lauren Wicinski	Honorable mention
2011	Lauren Wicinski	Third-team
2011	Kristin Hoffman	Honorable mention

=== Academic All-Americans ===
NIU volleyball has had three players named to CoSIDA academic All-America teams, including one first-team academic All-American selection.

Year	Player	Team
2010	Kristin Hoffman	Third-team
2011	Kristin Hoffman	First-team
2011	Allison McGlaughlin	Third-team

=== Players of the year ===
NIU volleyball has had ten players named player of the year by the conference.

Year	Player	Conference
1988	Cathy Holmes	NSC
1992	Wendy Mason	Mid-Con
1993	Nikki Kozak	Mid-Con
1996	Beth Burkholder	MCC
2001	Jenny Bowman	MAC
2006	Kate McCullagh	MAC
2010	Lauren Wicinski	MAC
2011	Lauren Wicinski	MAC
2015	T’ara Austin	MAC
2016	Jenna Radtke	MAC

=== Specialists of the year ===
NIU volleyball has had three players named specialist of the year by the conference.

Year	Player	Award	Conference
2009	Maddie Hughes	Defensive player of the year	MAC
2011	Kristin Hoffman	Setter of the year	MAC
2015	Alexis Gonzalez	Setter of the year	MAC

=== Coaches of the year ===
NIU volleyball has had nine head coaches named coach of the Year by the conference.

Year	Head coach	Conference
1992	Pete Waite	Mid-Con
1993	Pete Waite	Mid-Con
1997	Pete Waite	MAC
2001	Todd Kress	MAC
2006	Ray Gooden	MAC
2011	Ray Gooden	MAC
2012	Ray Gooden	MAC
2015	Ray Gooden	MAC
2016	Ray Gooden	MAC

== See also ==
- List of NCAA Division I women's volleyball programs
