= Wisconsin Badgers women's volleyball =

Women's volleyball team of the University of Wisconsin

- University: University of Wisconsin–Madison
- Head coach: Kelly Sheffield (14th season)
- Conference: Big Ten
- Location: Madison, Wisconsin, US
- Home arena: UW Field House (capacity: 7,540)
- Nickname: Badgers
- Colors: Cardinal and white

AIAW/NCAA tournament champion
- 2021

AIAW/NCAA tournament runner-up
- 2000, 2013, 2019

AIAW/NCAA tournament semifinal
- 2000, 2013, 2019, 2020, 2021, 2023, 2025

AIAW/NCAA Regional Final
- 1997, 1998, 2000, 2004, 2005, 2013, 2014, 2016, 2018, 2019, 2020, 2021, 2022, 2023, 2024, 2025

AIAW/NCAA regional semifinal
- 1990, 1991, 1996, 1997, 1998, 2000, 2001, 2004, 2005, 2006, 2013, 2014, 2015, 2016, 2017, 2018, 2019, 2020, 2021, 2022, 2023, 2024, 2025

AIAW/NCAA tournament appearance
- 1990, 1991, 1993, 1994, 1996, 1997, 1998, 1999, 2000, 2001, 2002, 2003, 2004, 2005, 2006, 2007, 2013, 2014, 2015, 2016, 2017, 2018, 2019, 2020, 2021, 2022, 2023, 2024, 2025

Conference regular season champion
- Big Ten Conference; 1990, 1997, 2000, 2001, 2014, 2019, 2020, 2021, 2022

Wisconsin Badgers women's volleyball is the team representing the University of Wisconsin–Madison in NCAA Division I women's volleyball. The university has a rich volleyball tradition, with origins dating back to 1974. They won a national title in 2021. They have had eleven head coaches since the team's inception. In the 2021 season, they ranked second in attendance among all Division I volleyball programs, averaging 7,540 fans over 15 regular season matches.

== Elite Eight appearances ==
The Badgers have reached the Elite Eight in the NCAA Division I women's volleyball tournament 16 times.

=== 1997 ===
Under coach John Cook, the Badgers achieved a 30–3 overall record, which was the best record since the team's inception (until they reached 31–3 in 2021), the team had a bye to the second round, where they beat Central Florida 3–0, and in the Sweet Sixteen, the team beat Notre Dame 3–1. The team lost to Florida 3–2 in the Elite Eight.

=== 1998 ===
The Badgers' overall record was 30–5, and reached the Elite Eight. The Badgers beat Arkansas-Little Rock 3–0 in the first round, San Diego 3–0 in the second round, and UCSB 3–2 in the Sweet Sixteen. The team lost to Nebraska 3–2 in the Elite Eight.

=== 2000 ===
The Badgers, under head coach Pete Waite, reached the NCAA national final, finishing with an overall record of 33–4. The 7-seed Badgers defeated Bucknell 3–0 in the first round, Northern Iowa 3–1 in the second round, Kansas State 3–1 in the Sweet Sixteen, 15-seed UCLA 3–1 in the Elite Eight, and 3-seed USC 3–0 in the Final Four. The team fell just short of a national championship, falling to 1-seed Nebraska 3–2. The Nebraska side was coached by former Badgers head coach John Cook. Both Lizzy Fitzgerald and Sherisa Livingston made the Final Four All-Tournament team.

=== 2004 ===
Following 2 consecutive second-round losses, the team found themselves in the Elite Eight again, finishing with an overall record of 22–10. The 14-seed Badgers defeated Loyola 3–0 in the first round, Notre Dame 3–0 in the second round, and 3-seed Hawaii 3–2 in the Sweet Sixteen, before being shut out by Stanford in the Elite Eight.

=== 2005 ===
The following year, the team made the Elite Eight again, finishing with an overall record of 26–7. The 11-seed Badgers defeated Loyola 3–0 in the first round, California 3–0 in the second round, and 6-seed Notre Dame 3–2 in the Sweet Sixteen, before being knocked out by 3-seed and eventual champion Washington 3–0 in the Elite Eight.

=== 2013 ===
Following a disappointing period (2008–2012) under Waite, head coach Kelly Sheffield, the former head coach of Albany and Dayton, was hired. In Sheffield's first season, the Badgers went 28–10. The 12-seed Badgers defeated Milwaukee 3–0 in the first round, California 3–0 in the second round, Florida State 3–1 in the Sweet Sixteen, and Purdue 3–1 in the Elite Eight. The team then became the lowest-seeded team to advance to the championship match, upsetting 1-seed Texas 3–1 in the Final Four. The "Cinderella" story, however, came to an end after being defeated by 2-seed Penn State in the championship. Deme Morales and Lauren Carlini made the Final Four All-Tournament team.

=== 2014 ===
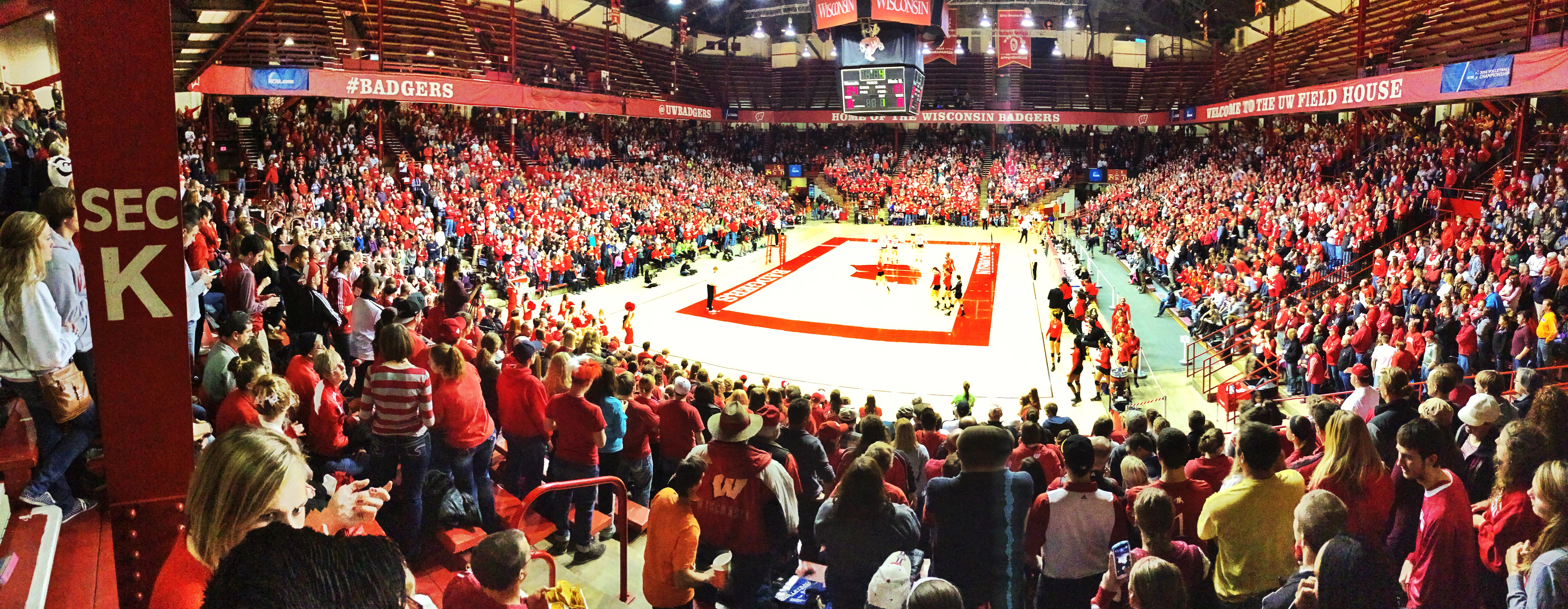
Panorama of the Wisconsin Field House during the NCAA Tournament game against Illinois State

The following year, the team went 31–3, the best record the team had ever achieved up to this point. Entering the NCAA Tournament, the Badgers were seeded fourth. The Badgers defeated Western Michigan 3–0 in the first round, Illinois State 3–0 in the second round, and Ohio State 3–2 in the Sweet Sixteen. The Badgers were beaten, however, by 5-seed Penn State in the Elite Eight. Penn State would go on to win the tournament.

=== 2016 ===
The team went 28–5, earning themselves a 3-seed in the NCAA Tournament. The Badgers defeated Howard 3–0 in the first round, Washington State 3–0 in the second round, and Ohio State 3–2 in the Sweet Sixteen. The team lost to 6-seed Stanford, the eventual winners, with a score of 3–2.

=== 2018 ===
Following a Sweet 16 appearance in 2017, the Badgers reached the Elite Eight once again in 2018. Following an overall record of 25–7, the 6-seed Badgers beat Green Bay 3–0 in the first round, Pepperdine 3–1 in the second round, and San Diego 3–0 in the Sweet Sixteen. The team lost to 3-seed Illinois 3–1 in the Elite Eight.

=== 2019 ===
The 2019 Badgers finished the season 27–7, and earned the fourth overall seed in the NCAA tournament. Wisconsin swept Illinois State, UCLA, 13th seeded Texas A&M, and fifth seeded Nebraska to reach the Final-4. The Badgers defeated top seeded Baylor 3–1 in its third Final-4 appearance. In the NCAA Championship, Wisconsin fell to third seeded Stanford 3–0.

=== 2020 ===
In a season shortened by the COVID-19 pandemic and played in Spring 2021, the Badgers finished the season 18–1, and earned the #1 overall seed in the NCAA tournament. Wisconsin swept Weber State, & 16th seeded BYU, before defeating eighth seeded Florida 3–2 in the Elite Eight. In their fourth NCAA Final-4 appearance, Wisconsin fell to fourth seeded Texas 3–0.

=== 2021 ===
The Badgers finished 31–3 on the season. Ranked #1 in the Big Ten conference, the Badgers carried a #4 ranking into the tournament.

The Badgers swept their way to the Final Four, defeating Colgate, Florida Gulf Coast, #13 UCLA, and #12 Minnesota.

Semifinal Round: The Badgers were able to take down the previously unbeaten #1 seed Louisville in the semi-final round of the tournament in a 5 set match.

Championship Round: The Badgers pulled off the championship victory in a five-set thriller over #10 Nebraska. As a team, the Badgers posted 24 blocks, the most in a national championship. Rettke notched 11 kills and 13 blocks, while freshman Anna Smrek led offensively with 14 kills on .429 hitting, Jade Demps had 12 kills on .396 hitting, and Grace Loberg finished off her career with 10 kills. Sydney Hilley dished out 51 assists. Referencing: Michella Chester, NCAA reporting 12/18/2021

=== 2022 ===
The Badgers finished the season 28–4, and earned the 3rd overall seed in the NCAA Tournament. The Badgers swept Quinnipiac, and TCU to advance to the Regionals for the 10th consecutive year. The Badgers defeated (4) Penn State 3–2 in the Sweet Sixteen, before falling to (2) Pitt 3–2 in the Elite Eight.

=== 2023 ===
Wisconsin finished the season 30–4, and earned the 3rd overall seed in the NCAA Tournament. The Badgers swept Jackson State, and Miami(FL) to advance to the Regionals for the 11th consecutive year. The Badgers defeated (5) Penn State 3–1 in the Sweet Sixteen, and (2) Oregon 3–1 in the Elite 8. The Badgers advanced to its 6th Final 4 appearance where it fell to (2) Texas 3–1.

=== 2024 ===
Wisconsin finished the season 26–7, and earned the 7th overall seed in the NCAA Tournament. The Badgers swept Fairfield, before knocking off Georgia Tech 3–1 to advance to the Regionals for the 12th consecutive year. The Badgers defeated Texas A&M 3–2 in the Sweet Sixteen. The season came to an end in the Elite Eight with the Badgers falling 3–0 to the 2nd overall seed, Nebraska.

=== 2025 ===
Wisconsin finished the season 28-5, and earned the 11th overall seed in the NCAA Tournament. The Badgers swept Eastern Illinois and North Carolina to advance to the Regionals for the 13th consecutive year. The Badgers defeated (2) Stanford 3-1 in the Sweet Sixteen, Wisconsin's first win over the Cardinal in program history. In the Elite Eight, the Badgers defeated (1) Texas 3-1 in Austin. The Badgers advanced to its 7th Final 4 appearance where it fell to (1) Kentucky 3-2.

== Results by season ==
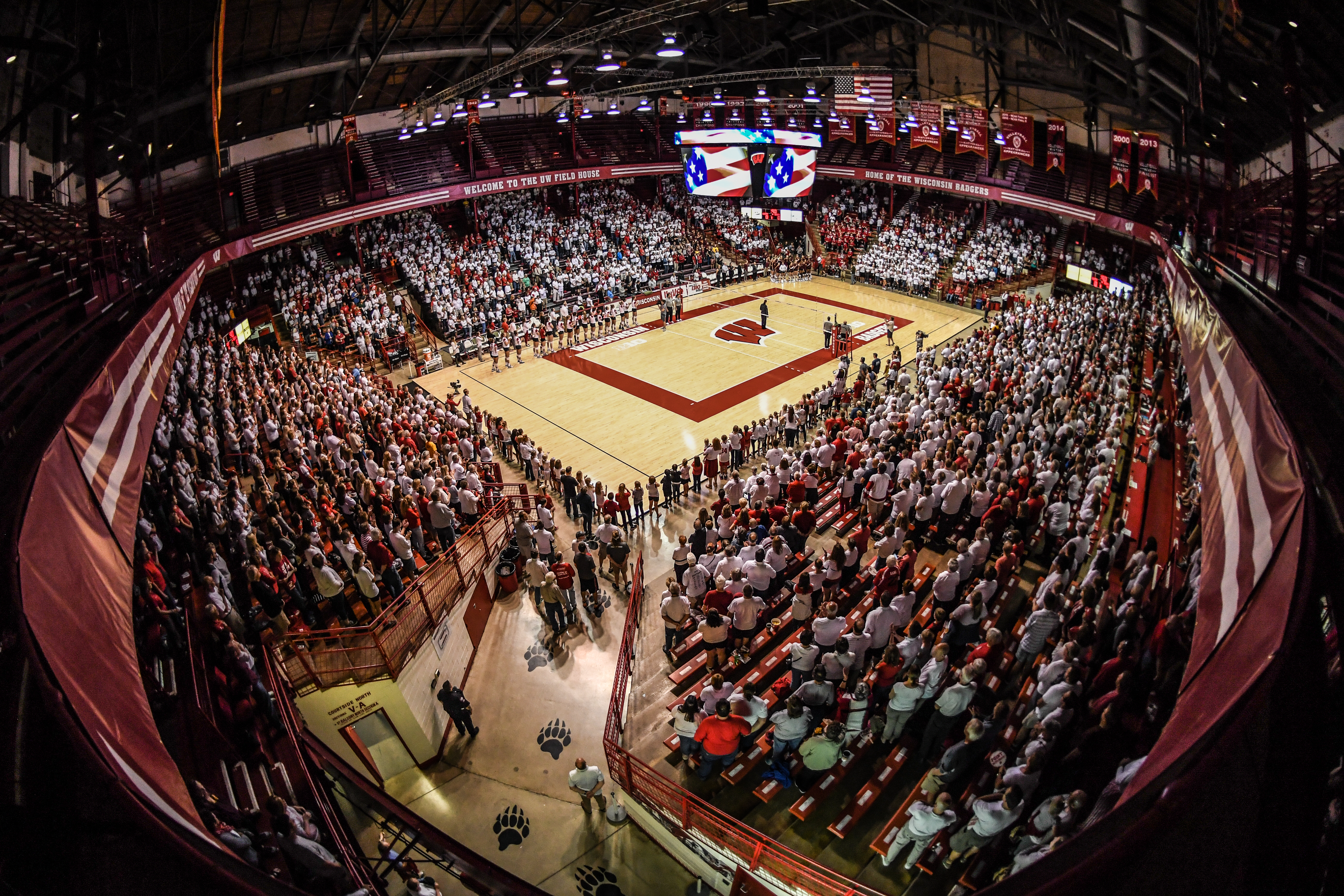
Wisconsin Field House during a volleyball game on October 4, 2017

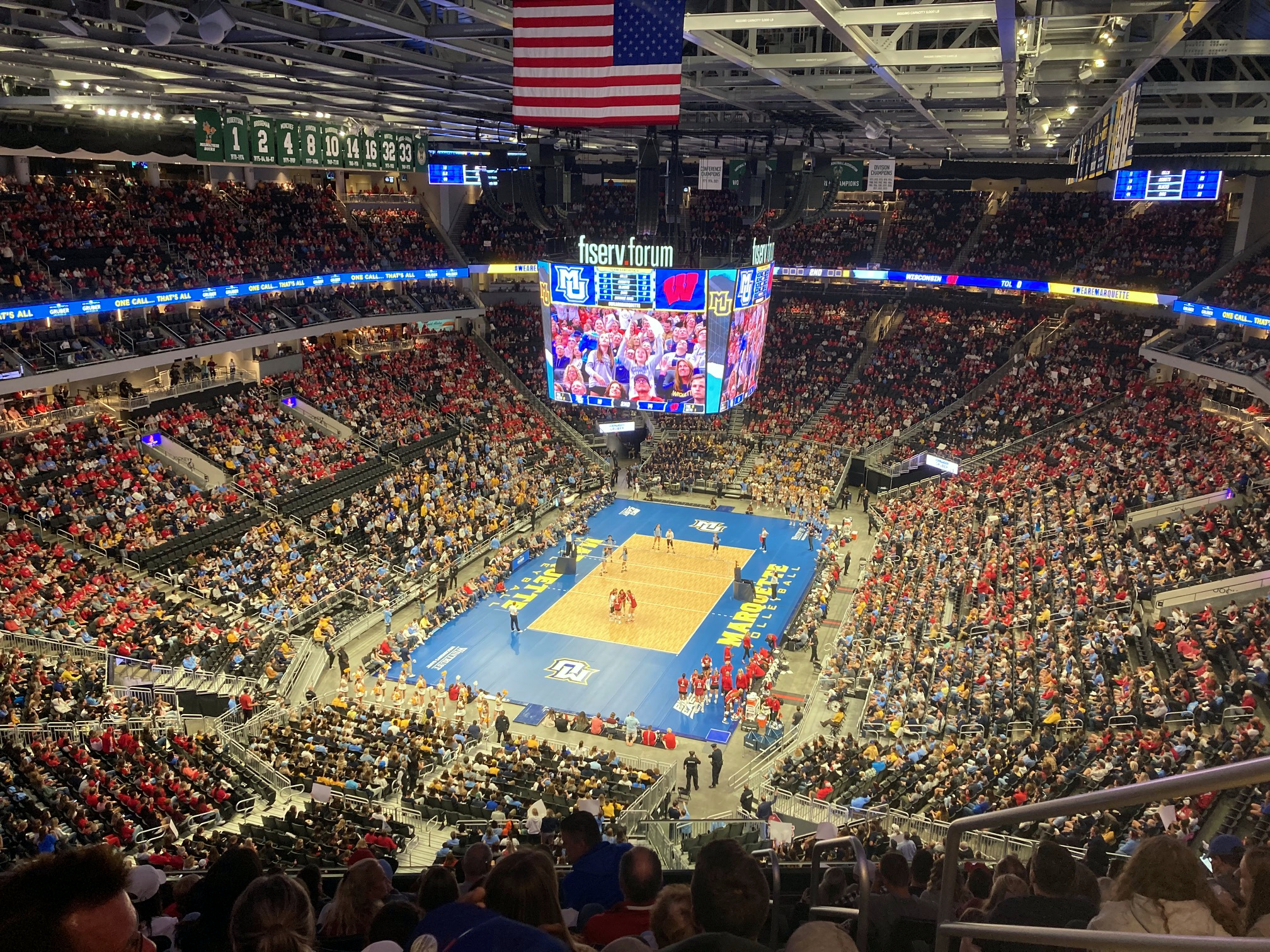
Wisconsin in action against Marquette at the Fiserv Forum in Milwaukee in 2023

Wisconsin playing Marquette in a September 2024 home game held at the Kohl Center

Wisconsin Field House during an October 2024 home game against the Northwestern Wildcats

Season Results
Year	Coach	Overall Record	Conference Record	Conference Standing	Postseason
1981	Niels Pedersen	5–29	0–4	10th	—
1982	Russ Carney	11–16	4–9	4th – West Division	—
1983	Russ Carney	15–17	4–9	4th – West Division	—
1984	Russ Carney	5–23	1–12	5th – West Division	—
1985	Russ Carney	7–24	2–16	9th	—
1986	Steve Lowe	16–18	5–13	8th	—
1987	Steve Lowe	21–11	9–9	5th	—
1988	Steve Lowe	16–16	7–11	8th	—
1989	Steve Lowe	26–11	9–9	5th	NIVC Champions
1990	Steve Lowe	29–7	16–2	1st	NCAA Sweet Sixteen
1991	Margie Fitzpatrick	23–10	15–5	2nd	NCAA Sweet Sixteen
1992	John Cook	14–17	9–11	7th	—
1993	John Cook	19–13	11–9	5th	NCAA Second Round
1994	John Cook	21–12	11–9	5th	NCAA First Round
1995	John Cook	22–15	9–11	7th	NIT Champions
1996	John Cook	25–8	13–7	5th	NCAA Sweet Sixteen
1997	John Cook	30–3	19–1	1st	NCAA Elite Eight
1998	John Cook	30–5	17–3	2nd	NCAA Elite Eight
1999	Pete Waite	21–9	15–5	2nd	NCAA Second Round
2000	Pete Waite	33–4	18–2	1st	NCAA Runners-up
2001	Pete Waite	27–4	19–1	1st	NCAA Sweet Sixteen
2002	Pete Waite	24–9	14–6	2nd	NCAA Second Round
2003	Pete Waite	22–11	13–7	4th	NCAA Second Round
2004	Pete Waite	22–10	13–7	4th	NCAA Elite Eight
2005	Pete Waite	26–7	15–5	2nd	NCAA Elite Eight
2006	Pete Waite	26–7	16–4	3rd	NCAA Sweet Sixteen
2007	Pete Waite	26–5	17–3	2nd	NCAA Second Round
2008	Pete Waite	17–15	7–13	7th	—
2009	Pete Waite	11–18	6–14	7th	—
2010	Pete Waite	16–15	5–15	10th	—
2011	Pete Waite	16–16	8–12	8th	—
2012	Pete Waite	17–16	5–15	10th	—
2013	Kelly Sheffield	28–10	12–8	4th	NCAA Runners-up
2014	Kelly Sheffield	31–3	19–1	1st	NCAA Elite Eight
2015	Kelly Sheffield	26–7	16–4	3rd	NCAA Sweet Sixteen
2016	Kelly Sheffield	28–5	17–3	2nd	NCAA Elite Eight
2017	Kelly Sheffield	22–10	11–9	6th	NCAA Sweet Sixteen
2018	Kelly Sheffield	25–7	15–5	3rd	NCAA Elite Eight
2019	Kelly Sheffield	27–7	18–2	1st	NCAA Runners-up
2020	Kelly Sheffield	18–1	15–0	1st	NCAA Final Four
2021	Kelly Sheffield	31–3	17–3	1st	NCAA Champions
2022	Kelly Sheffield	28–4	19–1	1st	NCAA Elite Eight
2023	Kelly Sheffield	30–4	17–3	2nd	NCAA Final Four
2024	Kelly Sheffield	26–7	17–3	3rd	NCAA Elite Eight
2025	Kelly Sheffield	28-5	17-3	2nd	NCAA Final Four
Totals	53 Years; 11 Coaches				29 Appearances

== All-Americans ==
In all, Wisconsin has 30 total AVCA All-Americans, including six first team All-Americans. Among these five, Dana Rettke is the nation's only ever five-time first team All-American, largely due to the NCAA's decision not to count the 2020–21 school year, heavily disrupted by COVID-19, against the college eligibility of any women's volleyball player.
* denotes Big Ten Player of the Year
^ denotes AVCA National Player of the Year

=== First team ===
- Sherisa Livingston* – 2000*, 2001
- Lauren Carlini* – 2014*, 2015, 2016
- Dana Rettke*^ – 2017, 2018, 2019*, 2020, 2021^
- Sydney Hilley – 2019, 2020, 2021
- Sarah Franklin*^ – 2023*^, 2024*
- Mimi Colyer - 2025

=== Second team ===
- Lisa Boyd* – 1990*
- Laura Abbinante – 1996
- Amy Lee – 1997
- Kelly Kennedy – 1997, 1998
- Jenny Maastricht – 1999
- Lizzy Fitzgerald* – 2000, 2001*
- Erin Byrd – 2002
- Jackie Simpson – 2006
- Brittney Dolgner – 2009
- Lauren Carlini – 2013
- Taylor Morey – 2014
- Courtney Thomas – 2014
- Haleigh Nelson – 2015, 2016
- Sydney Hilley – 2018
- Molly Haggerty – 2019
- Lauren Barnes – 2020, 2021
- Anna Smrek – 2023

=== Third team ===
- Morgan Shields – 2001
- Jill Odenthal – 2004
- Sheila Shaw – 2005
- Taylor Reineke – 2007
- Tionna Williams – 2016
- Molly Haggerty – 2016
- Madison Duello – 2018
- Devyn Robinson – 2020, 2022
- Danielle Hart – 2022
- Sarah Franklin – 2022
- Carter Booth – 2023, 2025
- Charlie Fuerbringer - 2024

== Other honors ==
=== Academic All-Americans ===
- Kathy Cogan – 1983
- Lauren Carlini – 2016
- Sydney Hilley – 2019, 2020, 2021
- Julia Orzol – 2023

=== Olympic Medalists ===
- Lauren Carlini - Paris '24 Silver Medalist (USA)
- Dana Rettke - Paris '24 Silver Medalist (USA)

- Most Outstanding Player, NCAA Final Four: Anna Smrek – 2021
- Elite 90, NCAA Championships: Julia Orzol – 2023

== See also ==
- List of NCAA Division I women's volleyball programs
