= Ryan McGuyre =

American volleyball coach (born 1976)

Current position
- Title: Head coach
- Team: Baylor
- Conference: Big 12
- Record: 173–63 (.733)

Biographical details
- Born: May 30, 1976 (age 50); La Habra, California, U.S.
- Education: Biola

Coaching career (HC unless noted)

Women's volleyball
- 1998–1999: NC State (GA)
- 1999–2001: Biola
- 2002–2011: California Baptist
- 2012: Maryland (assistant)
- 2013–2014: Florida State (AHC)
- 2015–present: Baylor

Men's volleyball
- 2003–2011: California Baptist

Head coaching record
- Overall: Women's: 467–183 (.718); Men's: 206–70 (.746)

Accomplishments and honors

Championships
- Women's: NCAA Division I Final Four Appearance (2019); Big 12 Champions (2019); 2x NAIA national champions (2004, 2005); NCCAA national champions (2011); Men's: 6x NAIA national champions (2004-2007, 2010, 2011)

Awards
- Women's: 2x Big 12 Coach of the Year (2017, 2019); AVCA National Coach of the Year (2019); AVCA Southwest Region Coach of the Year (2019); Volleyball Magazine National Coach of the Year (2019); GSAC Coach of the Year (2010); Men's: AVCA/NAIA Coach of the Year (2010)

Ryan McGuyre (born May 30, 1976) is an American volleyball head coach at Baylor University (2015–present).

== Coaching career ==
=== Florida State ===
On August 2, 2013, McGuyre was announced as an assistant coach for the Florida State volleyball program.

=== Baylor ===
On December 24, 2014, McGuyre was announced as the new head coach of the Baylor volleyball program.

== Head coaching record ==
=== Women's volleyball ===
Record table
Season	Team	Overall	Conference	Standing	Postseason
Biola Eagles (Golden State Athletic Conference) (1999–2001)
1999	Biola	16–13	12–6	4th	
2000	Biola	22–10	13–5	3rd	
2001	Biola	22–14	13–7	T-4th	
Biola:		60–37 (.619)	38–18 (.679)		
California Baptist Lancers (Golden State Athletic Conference) (2002–2010)
2002	California Baptist	15–19	6–14	8th	
2003	California Baptist	9–23	1–16	11th	
2004	California Baptist	37–5	16–4	3rd	NAIA national champions
2005	California Baptist	34–5	18–2	2nd	NAIA national champions
2006	California Baptist	32–8	16–4	3rd	NAIA National semifinals
2007	California Baptist	32–5	18–2	2nd	NAIA National runner-up
2008	California Baptist	28–9	13–7	4th	NAIA National semifinals
2009	California Baptist	29–6	16–4	2nd	NAIA national quarterfinals
2010	California Baptist	33–6	16–4	2nd	NAIA national quarterfinals
California Baptist Lancers (Pacific West Conference) (2011)
2011	California Baptist	26–10	11–5	3rd	NCCAA national champions
California Baptist:		275–96 (.741)	131–62 (.679)		
Baylor Lady Bears/Bears (Big 12 Conference) (2015–present)
2015	Baylor	17–13	5–11	7th	
2016	Baylor	22–12	9–7	T-4th	NCAA second round
2017	Baylor	24–7	13–3	2nd	NCAA second round
2018	Baylor	20–9	11–5	2nd	NCAA second round
2019	Baylor	29–2	15–1	T-1st	NCAA National semifinal
2020	Baylor	20–7	13–3	2nd	NCAA regional semifinal
2021	Baylor	22–6	14–2	2nd	NCAA regional semifinal
2022	Baylor	25–7	12–4	2nd	NCAA regional semifinal
2023	Baylor	17–13	10–8	T–6th	NCAA second round
Baylor:		196–76 (.721)	102–44 (.699)		
Total:		531–209 (.718)			
National champion Postseason invitational champion Conference regular season champion Conference regular season and conference tournament champion Division regular season champion Division regular season and conference tournament champion Conference tournament champion

=== Men's volleyball ===
Record table
Season	Team	Overall	Conference	Standing	Postseason
California Baptist Lancers () (2003–2011)
2003	California Baptist	22–6			NAIA National semifinals
2004	California Baptist	24–3			NAIA national champions
2005	California Baptist	26–7			NAIA national champions
2006	California Baptist	23–8			NAIA national champions
2007	California Baptist	22–10			NAIA national champions
2008	California Baptist	15–12			NAIA National runner-ups
2009	California Baptist	25–8			NAIA National runner-ups
2010	California Baptist	23–11			NAIA national champions
2011	California Baptist	26–5			NAIA national champions
California Baptist:		206–70 (.746)			
Total:		206–70 (.746)			
National champion Postseason invitational champion Conference regular season champion Conference regular season and conference tournament champion Division regular season champion Division regular season and conference tournament champion Conference tournament champion
