= Dana Rettke =

American volleyball player (born 1999)

- Rettke in 2025

Personal information
- Full name: Dana Lynn Rettke
- Born: January 21, 1999 (age 27); Riverside, Illinois, United States
- Height: 204 cm (6 ft 8 in)
- Weight: 85 kg (187 lb)
- Education: Wisconsin

Volleyball information
- Position: Middle blocker
- Current club: (Turkey) Eczacıbaşı
- Number: 14

Career
Years	Teams
2017–2021	(United States) Wisconsin
2022–2024	(Italy) Vero Volley Milano
2024–present	(Turkey) Eczacıbaşı

National team
2019–present	United States
Medal record
Women's volleyball
Representing the United States
Olympic Games
Silver medal – second place	2024 Paris	Team
FIVB Nations League
Gold medal – first place	2019 China	Team competition

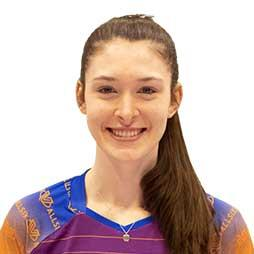
Rettke in 2022

Dana Lynn Rettke (/ˈrɛtki/ RET-kee; born January 21, 1999) is an American professional volleyball player for Eczacıbaşı Dynavit in the Turkish Sultanlar Ligi. She played collegiate volleyball at the University of Wisconsin–Madison and is the first five-time AVCA First Team All American in collegiate history. Rettke was also a member of the U.S. national team and has won All-Big Ten honors in each of her five college seasons, was the 2019–20 Big Ten Female Athlete of the Year and the 2021-2022 winner of the Honda Sports Award for women's volleyball.

== Early life ==
Growing up in Riverside, Illinois, Rettke graduated from Riverside Brookfield High School in 2017. She began playing basketball in first grade and volleyball in ninth grade. Although she had recruiting interest from multiple basketball programs in the Big Ten Conference, Rettke decided to focus on volleyball after feeling overwhelmed during an open gym practice with Illinois Fighting Illini women's basketball players.

As a sophomore in October 2014, Rettke verbally committed to the Wisconsin Badgers women's volleyball team. An Illinois Player of the Year, she earned multiple All-American honors as a senior, USA Today first team and American Volleyball Coaches Association (AVCA) second team.

== College career ==
After high school, Rettke enrolled at the University of Wisconsin–Madison in 2017 and majored in business marketing. A 203 cm (6 ft 8 in) middle blocker for the Wisconsin Badgers, she was the tallest member of the team when she joined. Starting in all 32 matches of 2017, Rettke played in 113 sets and averaged 4.39 points, 3.42 kills, 1.37 blocks, and 0.22 service aces. Rettke earned All-Big Ten and first-team AVCA All-American honors that season.

In 2018, Rettke again started all 32 matches. In 117 sets, Rettke averaged 3.74 kills and 1.54 blocks. For the second straight season, Rettke was on the All-Big Ten team and AVCA All-American first team.

As a junior in 2019, Rettke played in 32 of 34 matches with 30 starts, missing two matches due to a foot injury. Rettke had a team leading 3.75 kills per set, the fifth best in the Big Ten. Rettke was part of a team that qualified for the championship match of the 2019 NCAA Tournament. Rettke finished 2019 with her third consecutive All-Big Ten and first-team AVCA All-American honors and was the 2019–20 Big Ten Female Athlete of the Year. On December 18, 2021 Rettke helped lead the Badgers to its first ever NCAA national championship and was named to the NCAA Final Four All-Tournament team. On January 4, 2022, Rettke was named the Honda Sports Award volleyball winner as the nation's top collegiate female volleyball player. In June 2022, Rettke won Big Ten Female Athlete of the Year award for the second time. With the honor, she became the first Big Ten student-athlete ever chosen Big Ten Athlete of the Year in non-consecutive seasons, and became the third two-time recipient of the Big Ten Female Athlete of the Year Award.

== International career ==
=== National team ===
Rettke was part of the 2018 USA Volleyball Collegiate National Team. In May 2019, Rettke was selected to the United States women's national volleyball team for the 2019 FIVB Volleyball Women's Nations League in Nanjing, China. Competing in five matches, Rettke helped the U.S. win gold in the Nations League. Then in August, Rettke competed with Team USA in the 2019 FIVB Women's Volleyball Intercontinental Olympic Qualification Tournament, in which Team USA qualified for the 2020 Summer Olympics. She played for the 2024 Paris Olympics team that won the silver medal.

=== Club ===
Following her career at Wisconsin, she signed on to play professional volleyball with A1 Italian club team, Vero Volley Milano in 2022. Rettke signed with Turkish club Eczacıbaşı in May 2024.

== Awards ==
=== Vero Volley Milano ===
- 2023-24 CEV Women's Champions League - Runner-up
- 2021-22 LVF Serie A1 - Runner-up
- 2022-23 Italian Cup - Runner-up
- 2022-23 LVF Serie A1 - Runner-up
- 2023-24 Italian Cup - Runner-up

==== Eczacıbaşı ====
- 2025-26 CEV Women's Champions League - Runner-up
- 2024-25 Turkish Women's Volleyball Cup - Runner-up
- 2025-26 Turkish Women's Volleyball Cup - Runner-up

=== National team ===
- 2024 Summer Olympics - Silver Medal - USA
- 2019 FIVB Women's Volleyball Nations League - Champion
- 2023 Women's NORCECA Volleyball Championship - Runner-up
- 2026 Women's NORCECA Volleyball Championship - Runner-up
