= Iowa State Cyclones women's volleyball =

American college volleyball team

- Founded: 1973; 53 years ago
- University: Iowa State University
- Head coach: Christy Johnson-Lynch (22nd season)
- Conference: Big 12
- Location: Ames, Iowa, US
- Home arena: Hilton Coliseum (capacity: 14,384)
- Nickname: Cyclones
- Colors: Cardinal and gold

AIAW/NCAA Regional Final
- 2008, 2011

AIAW/NCAA regional semifinal
- 2007, 2008, 2009, 2011, 2012

AIAW/NCAA tournament appearance
- 1995, 2006, 2007, 2008, 2009, 2010, 2011, 2012, 2013, 2014, 2015, 2016, 2017, 2019, 2021, 2022, 2023, 2025

The Iowa State Cyclones women's volleyball is the team represents Iowa State University (ISU) and they compete in the Big 12 Conference of NCAA Division I. The team is currently coached by Christy Johnson-Lynch, she is in her 22nd year at Iowa State. The Cyclones play their home matches at Hilton Coliseum on the Iowa State's campus.

== History ==
=== Early years ===
Iowa State first put together a volleyball squad in 1973 under coach Gloria Crosby. Initially just playing in regional tournaments and the occasional one-off match, they began participating in then brand new Big Eight tournament in 1976. Then in 1982 the Big Eight offered volleyball as a full sport including in-season conference play. The Cyclones struggled to put together competitive squads for most of their early years. Until 1995 they were unable to finish in the top half of the Big Eight. Jackie Nunez's 1995 team was the first in school history to make the NCAA Tournament to go along with their second-place finish in the conference.

The 1997 transition to the Big 12 did not treat the Cyclones well. During their first nine seasons as a member of the Big 12, they were only able to win 13 out of 59 matches in conference play.

=== Christy Johnson-Lynch (2005–present) ===
The hiring of Christy Johnson-Lynch in 2005 brought new life to the Cyclones as she has taken them to new heights. She took the Cyclones to the second round of the NCAA tournament in 2006 and returned every year until 2018. This includes three Sweet 16 teams and two runs to Elite 8. She has produced 22 AVCA All-Americans.

== Record ==
Record
Big Eight (1973–1996)
Year	Head Coach	Overall Record	Conference Record	Conference Standing	Postseason
1973	Gloria Crosby	22–8	–	–	–
1974	Gloria Crosby	23–9	–	–	–
1975	Kay Pundt	49–31	–	–	–
1976	Diane Hale	15–13–1	–	6th	–
1977	Diane Hale	18–30–1	–	T-4th	–
1978	Sharon Hitsman	19–29–3	–	T-6th	–
1979	Sharon Hitsman	27–29–3	–	T-4th	–
1980	Sharon Hitsman	39–22–1	–	T-5th	–
1981	Mary Fischl	24–22–1	–	T-5th	–
1982	Mary Fischl	17–18	5-5	3rd	–
1983	Mary Fischl	18–13	5-5	4th	–
1984	Mary Fischl	21–9	6–5	3rd	–
1985	Vicki Mealer	15-15	1–9	6th	–
1986	Vicki Mealer	13–15	4–6	4th	
1987	Vicki Mealer	20–11	8–4	3rd	–
1988	Vicki Mealer	12–17	4–8	4th	–
1989	Vicki Mealer	17-17	6-6	4th	–
1990	Vicki Mealer	22–12	8–4	3rd	–
1991	Vicki Mealer	15–12	6-6	T-3rd	–
1992		21–11	7–5	3rd	–
1993	Jackie Nunez	9–19	5–7	T-4th	–
1994	Jackie Nunez	24–11	8–4	3rd	–
1995	Jackie Nunez	22–12	8–4	T-2nd	NCAA Second Round
1996	Jackie Nunez	7–25	3–17	10th	–
Big 12 (1996–Present)
Year	Head Coach	Overall Record	Conference Record	Conference Standing	Postseason
1997	Jackie Nunez	10–23	1–19	11th	–
1998	Kerry Miller	3–29	1–19	11th	–
1999	Linda Crum	3–24	1–19	11th	–
2000	Linda Crum	2–27	0–20	11th	–
2001	Linda Crum	4–22	1–19	11th	–
2002	Linda Crum	10–22	1–19	11th	–
2003	Linda Crum	12–19	4–16	8th	–
2004	Linda Crum	8–21	1–19	11th	–
2005	Christy Johnson-Lynch	16–15	9–11	T-6th	–
2006	Christy Johnson-Lynch	21–11	12–8	T-4th	NCAA Second Round
2007	Christy Johnson-Lynch	19–14	11–9	5th	NCAA Sweet 16
2008	Christy Johnson-Lynch	22–13	11–9	T-4th	NCAA Elite 8
2009	Christy Johnson-Lynch	27–5	17–3	2nd	NCAA Sweet 16
2010	Christy Johnson-Lynch	20–9	13–7	3rd	NCAA First Round
2011	Christy Johnson-Lynch	25–6	13–3	2nd	NCAA Elite 8
2012	Christy Johnson-Lynch	22–8	13–3	2nd	NCAA Sweet 16
2013	Christy Johnson-Lynch	18–10	11–5	T-3rd	NCAA First Round
2014	Christy Johnson-Lynch	19–10	10–6	T-2nd	NCAA Second Round
2015	Christy Johnson-Lynch	19–11	11–5	3rd	NCAA Second Round
2016	Christy Johnson-Lynch	18–11	10–6	3rd	NCAA First Round
2017	Christy Johnson-Lynch	22–7	11–5	T-3rd	NCAA Second Round
2018	Christy Johnson-Lynch	21–13	9–7	T-3rd	NIVC Champions
2019	Christy Johnson-Lynch	17–12	8-8	4th	NCAA First Round
2020	Christy Johnson-Lynch	8–12	5–9	6th	–
2021	Christy Johnson-Lynch	16–12	8-8	4th	NCAA First Round
2022	Christy Johnson-Lynch	20–12	10–6	4th	NCAA Second Round
2023	Christy Johnson-Lynch	20–10	11–7	T-4th	NCAA First Round
Total	–	911–797-10	297–369	–	23–17

== Individual awards ==
=== All-Americans ===
All-Americans
Year	Player	Type
2006	Erin Boeve	Honorable Mention
2008	Kaylee Manns; Ashley Mass; Victoria Henson	Second Team; Third Team; Honorable Mention
2009	Ashley Mass; Kaylee Manns; Victoria Henson	First Team; Second Team; Third Team
2010	Victoria Henson; Ashley Mass; Jamie Straube	First Team; Third Team; Honorable Mention
2011	Alison Landwehr; Carly Jenson; Kristen Hahn; Jamie Straube	First Team; Second Team; Honorable Mention; Honorable Mention
2012	Kristen Hahn; Alison Landwehr; Victoria Hurtt	Second Team; Third Team; Honorable Mention
2013	Kristen Hahn; Mackenzie Bigbee	Second Team; Honorable Mention
2014	Caitlin Nolan	Third Team
2015	Caitlin Nolan	Second Team
2016	Jess Schaben	Honorable Mention

== See also ==
- List of NCAA Division I women's volleyball programs
