= 2012 NCAA Division I women's volleyball tournament =

2012 collegiate women's volleyball championship tournament

2012 NCAA women's Division I volleyball tournament
- 2012 Division I Championship
- Champions: Texas (2nd NCAA (3rd national) title)
- Runner-up: Oregon (1st title match)
- Semifinalists: Michigan (1st Final Four); Penn State (10th Final Four)
- Winning coach: Jerritt Elliott (1st title)
- Most outstanding player: Bailey Webster (Texas)
- Final Four All-Tournament Team: Hannah Allison (Texas); Haley Eckerman (Texas); Sha'Dare McNeal (Texas); Alaina Bergsma (Oregon); Liz Brenner (Oregon); Lexi Erwin (Michigan)

The 2012 NCAA Division I women's volleyball tournament began on November 29, 2012, and concluded with the championship match on December 15 at the KFC Yum! Center in Louisville, Kentucky. Third-seeded Texas defeated fifth-seeded Oregon in three sets (25–11, 26–24, 25–19), winning its second NCAA championship and third national championship overall. The 64-team field was announced on November 25, 2012.

Michigan reached the national semifinals for the first time in program history, despite not being among the 16 nationally seeded teams. Oregon reached its first championship match after defeating Penn State in the other semifinal, while Texas defeated Michigan in five sets.

== Qualifying teams ==
Thirty-one conferences received automatic bids to the 64-team field, while the remaining 33 places were filled by at-large selections. The NCAA seeded the top 16 teams nationally, with Penn State, Stanford, Texas and Nebraska receiving the top four seeds. Twenty-two conferences determined their automatic qualifiers through conference tournaments; the other nine awarded their places based on regular-season results: the Atlantic Coast Conference, Big 12 Conference, Big West Conference, Big Ten Conference, Ivy League, Mountain West Conference, Pac-12 Conference, Southeastern Conference and West Coast Conference.

=== Records ===
The following tables present the teams' records and RPI values at selection. Automatic indicates a conference automatic qualifier; At-large indicates an at-large selection.

Purdue Regional
Seed	School	Conference	Berth type	RPI	Record
	Binghamton	America East	Automatic	250	13–17
	Bowling Green	Mid-American	Automatic	53	21–10
	Colorado State	Mountain West	Automatic	34	21–7
	Creighton	Missouri Valley	Automatic	26	28–3
	East Tennessee State	Atlantic Sun	Automatic	134	23–12
9	Florida State	Atlantic Coast	Automatic	8	27–3
	Hofstra	Colonial	Automatic	152	21–13
16	Kentucky	Southeastern	At-large	19	20–10
	Liberty	Big South	Automatic	124	25–7
	Marquette	Big East	At-large	33	27–6
8	Minnesota	Big Ten	At-large	9	24–7
	Notre Dame	Big East	At-large	38	20–9
	Ohio State	Big Ten	At-large	25	22–10
1	Penn State	Big Ten	Automatic	2	29–2
	Purdue	Big Ten	At-large	29	21–10
	Yale	Ivy League	Automatic	66	18–5

Nebraska Regional
Seed	School	Conference	Berth type	RPI	Record
	Arizona State	Pac-12	At-large	42	20–13
12	BYU	West Coast	Automatic	11	26–3
	Central Arkansas	Southland	Automatic	49	30–4
	Dayton	Atlantic 10	Automatic	20	26–4
	Hawaii	Big West	Automatic	17	25–2
	Kansas State	Big 12	At-large	23	21–8
	Maryland-Eastern Shore	Mid-Eastern Athletic	Automatic	158	28–5
4	Nebraska	Big Ten	At-large	5	23–6
	New Mexico State	Western Athletic	Automatic	91	22–10
	Northern Colorado	Big Sky	Automatic	65	24–10
	Northern Iowa	Missouri Valley	At-large	44	24–9
	Oklahoma	Big 12	At-large	27	21–10
5	Oregon	Pac-12	At-large	10	25–4
	Pepperdine	West Coast	At-large	35	20–11
	Santa Clara	West Coast	At-large	45	20–11
13	Washington	Pac-12	At-large	16	23–6

Texas Regional
Seed	School	Conference	Berth type	RPI	Record
	Arkansas	Southeastern	At-large	30	22–9
	Cleveland State	Horizon	Automatic	71	23–6
	Colgate	Patriot	Automatic	176	17–13
	College of Charleston	Southern	Automatic	48	26–7
	Fairfield	Metro Atlantic	Automatic	145	22–8
14	Florida	Southeastern	Automatic	12	25–4
11	Kansas	Big 12	At-large	7	25–6
	Miami (FL)	Atlantic Coast	At-large	22	25–5
	NC State	Atlantic Coast	At-large	43	22–9
	San Diego State	Mountain West	At-large	41	23–7
	St. Mary's	West Coast	At-large	32	17–10
3	Texas	Big 12	Automatic	3	23–4
	Texas A&M	Southeastern	At-large	15	24–5
	Tulsa	Conference USA	Automatic	47	26–9
6	USC	Pac-12	At-large	13	27–5
	Wichita State	Missouri Valley	At-large	40	22–9

California Regional
Seed	School	Conference	Berth type	RPI	Record
	Belmont	Ohio Valley	Automatic	167	18–16
	California	Pac-12	At-large	39	15–15
15	Iowa State	Big 12	At-large	18	20–7
	IPFW	Summit	Automatic	57	25–6
	Jackson State	Southwestern Athletic	Automatic	252	24–11
	LIU-Brooklyn	Northeast	Automatic	127	25–7
10	Louisville	Big East	Automatic	4	29–3
	Loyola Marymount	West Coast	At-large	46	18–12
	Michigan	Big Ten	At-large	31	23–11
	Michigan State	Big Ten	At-large	36	23–9
	North Carolina	Atlantic Coast	At-large	14	25–5
	San Diego	West Coast	At-large	24	21–6
2	Stanford	Pac-12	Automatic	1	27–3
	Tennessee	Southeastern	At-large	21	22–7
7	UCLA	Pac-12	At-large	6	22–7
	Western Kentucky	Sun Belt	Automatic	28	32–3

The Big Ten and Pac-12 each received six at-large bids in addition to their automatic bids; the West Coast received five, the Big 12 and Southeastern four each, the Atlantic Coast three, the Big East and Missouri Valley two each, and the Mountain West one. The remaining 22 conferences received only their automatic qualification places.

== Bracket ==
The first two rounds were played at campus sites, while the regional semifinals and regional finals were held at four predetermined sites: West Lafayette, Indiana; Omaha, Nebraska; Austin, Texas; and Berkeley, California.

=== Purdue Regional ===
First round
1	Penn State	3
Binghamton	0
University Park, PA
Yale	2
Bowling Green	3
Ohio State	3
Notre Dame	0
Lexington, KY
16	Kentucky	3
East Tennessee State	0
9	Florida State	3
Hofstra	0
Tallahassee, FL
Colorado State	0
Purdue	3
Creighton	3
Marquette	0
Minneapolis, MN
8	Minnesota	3
Liberty	0

Second round
1	Penn State	3
Bowling Green	0
Ohio State	1
16	Kentucky	3
9	Florida State	2
Purdue	3
Creighton	1
8	Minnesota	3

Regional semifinals
1	Penn State	3
16	Kentucky	0
Purdue	1
8	Minnesota	3

Regional finals
1	Penn State	3
8	Minnesota	1

=== Nebraska Regional ===
First round
5	Oregon	3
Northern Colorado	0
Eugene, OR
Pepperdine	2
Dayton	3
Oklahoma	3
Arizona State	2
Provo, UT
12	BYU	3
New Mexico State	0
13	Washington	3
Central Arkansas	0
Seattle, WA
Santa Clara	0
Hawaii	3
Kansas State	0
Northern Iowa	3
Lincoln, NE
4	Nebraska	3
Maryland-Eastern Shore	0

Second round
5	Oregon	3
Dayton	0
Oklahoma	0
12	BYU	3
13	Washington	3
Hawaii	2
Northern Iowa	0
4	Nebraska	3

Regional semifinals
5	Oregon	3
12	BYU	1
13	Washington	0
4	Nebraska	3

Regional finals
5	Oregon	3
4	Nebraska	1

=== Texas Regional ===
First round
3	Texas	3
Colgate	0
Austin, TX
North Carolina State	1
Texas A&M	3
Miami	2
College of Charleston	3
Gainesville, FL
14	Florida	3
Tulsa	0
11	Kansas	3
Cleveland State	1
Lawrence, KS
Wichita State	3
Arkansas	2
St. Mary's	3
San Diego State	2
Los Angeles, CA
6	USC	3
Fairfield	0

Second round
3	Texas	3
Texas A&M	1
College of Charleston	0
14	Florida	3
11	Kansas	1
Wichita State	3
St. Mary's	0
6	USC	3

Regional semifinals
3	Texas	3
14	Florida	0
Wichita State	0
6	USC	3

Regional finals
3	Texas	3
6	USC	0

=== California Regional ===
First round
7	UCLA	3
LIU-Brooklyn	0
Los Angeles, CA
Michigan State	3
San Diego	2
Tennessee	2
Michigan	3
Louisville, KY
10	Louisville	3
Belmont	1
15	Iowa State	3
IPFW	2
Ames, IA
California	1
North Carolina	3
Western Kentucky	3
Loyola Marymount	0
Stanford, CA
2	Stanford	3
Jackson State	0

Second round
7	UCLA	1
Michigan State	3
Michigan	3
10	Louisville	1
15	Iowa State	3
North Carolina	2
Western Kentucky	0
2	Stanford	3

Regional semifinals
Michigan State	0
Michigan	3
15	Iowa State	0
2	Stanford	3

Regional finals
Michigan	3
2	Stanford	1

== Final Four ==
National Semifinals
1	Penn State	1
5	Oregon	3
3	Texas	3
Michigan	2

National Championship
5	Oregon	0
3	Texas	3

=== Final Four All-Tournament Team ===
The following players were selected to the Final Four All-Tournament Team.

- Bailey Webster (Texas), Most Outstanding Player
- Hannah Allison (Texas)
- Haley Eckerman (Texas)
- Sha'Dare McNeal (Texas)
- Alaina Bergsma (Oregon)
- Liz Brenner (Oregon)
- Lexi Erwin (Michigan)

== Texas championship team ==
The 2012 Texas Longhorns volleyball team was coached by Jerritt Elliott. Texas finished the season 29–4 after winning the championship match against Oregon. The following players appeared on Texas's published 2012 season roster; the preseason media guide listed 14 players, while the university's current archived roster page lists 12.

=== Players (by last name) ===
- No. 12 – Hannah Allison, setter (junior).
- No. 16 – Sarah (Palmer) Baldwin, libero (junior). She was listed as Sarah Palmer and was the starting libero in the championship match.
- No. 24 – Ashley Bannister, outside hitter (redshirt sophomore). Her season ended due to injury in October 2012.
- No. 1 – Khat Bell, middle blocker/outside hitter (sophomore).
- No. 6 – Kat Brooks, libero (freshman).
- No. 7 – Nicole Dalton, outside hitter/setter (freshman).
- No. 10 – Haley Eckerman, outside hitter (sophomore). She recorded 12 kills in the championship match.
- No. 22 – Megan Futch, libero (junior).
- No. 15 – Sara Hattis, middle blocker (freshman).
- No. 3 – Madelyn Hutson, utility (sophomore).
- No. 5 – Molly McCage, middle blocker (freshman).
- No. 14 – Sha'Dare McNeal, utility (senior).
- No. 9 – Amy Neal, libero/outside hitter (freshman). She appeared in 20 matches during the 2012 season.
- No. 23 – Bailey Webster, outside hitter (junior).

=== Coaching staff ===
The coaching staff is documented in the university's contemporaneous 2012 fact book.

- Jerritt Elliott – Head coach.
- Salima Rockwell – Associate head coach.
- Erik Sullivan – Assistant coach.
- Brian Wright – Volunteer assistant coach.

=== Athletic performance and support staff ===
- Donnie Maib – Strength and conditioning coach.
- DeAnn Koehler – Athletic trainer.
- Nathan Mendoza – Special assistant.
- Kelly Govea – Administrative associate.

== Record by conference ==
Conference	# of bids	Record	Win %	R32	S16	E8	F4	CM	NC
Big Ten	7	19–7*	.731	7	6	4	2	–	–
Pac-12	7	14–7	.667	5	4	3	1	1	–
Big 12	5	10–4	.714	4	2	1	1	1	1
Southeastern	5	5–5	.500	3	2	–	–	–	–
West Coast	6	3–6	.333	2	1	–	–	–	–
Missouri Valley	3	4–3	.571	3	1	–	–	–	–
Atlantic Coast	4	2–4	.333	2	–	–	–	–	–
Atlantic 10	1	1–1	.500	1	–	–	–	–	–
Big East	3	1–3	.250	1	–	–	–	–	–
Big West	1	1–1	.500	1	–	–	–	–	–
Mid-American	1	1–1	.500	1	–	–	–	–	–
Southern	1	1–1	.500	1	–	–	–	–	–
Sun Belt	1	1–1	.500	1	–	–	–	–	–
Mountain West	2	0–2	.000	–	–	–	–	–	–
Other	17	0–17	.000	–	–	–	–	–	–

* Three of the Big Ten's losses were to fellow Big Ten schools (and therefore also counted as wins).

The columns R32, S16, E8, F4, CM, and NC stand for the Round of 32, Sweet Sixteen, Elite Eight, Final Four, Championship Match, and National Champion, respectively.

The America East, Atlantic Sun, Big Sky, Big South, Colonial Athletic, Conference USA, Horizon League, Ivy League, Metro Atlantic, Mid-Eastern Athletic, Northeast, Ohio Valley, Patriot League, Southland, Southwestern Athletic, Summit League, and Western Athletic Conferences each had one team that lost in the first round.

== NCAA tournament record ==
During the 2012 tournament, Micha Hancock of Penn State recorded 22 service aces (10 against Binghamton, five against Bowling Green, two against Kentucky and five against Minnesota). Penn State reported that the total set an NCAA tournament record at the time.
