= 2019 NCAA Division I women's volleyball tournament =

Volleyball competition

2019 NCAA women's Division I volleyball tournament
- 2019 NCAA Division I Women's Volleyball Championship
- Finals site: PPG Paints Arena; Pittsburgh, Pennsylvania
- Champions: Stanford (9th title)
- Runner-up: Wisconsin (3rd title match)
- Semifinalists: Baylor (1st Final Four); Minnesota (6th Final Four)
- Winning coach: Kevin Hambly (2nd title)
- Most outstanding player: Kathryn Plummer (2nd) (Stanford)
- Final Four All-Tournament Team: Morgan Hentz (Stanford); Jenna Gray (Stanford); Dana Rettke (Wisconsin); Molly Haggerty (Wisconsin); Yossiana Pressley (Baylor); Alexis Hart (Minnesota)

The 2019 NCAA Division I women's volleyball tournament began on December 6, 2019 and concluded on December 21 at the PPG Paints Arena in Pittsburgh, Pennsylvania. The tournament field was announced on December 1, 2019. Stanford beat Wisconsin in the final to claim their ninth national championship.

== Qualifying Teams ==
Waco Regional
Seed	RPI	School	Conference	Berth Type	Record
1	1	Baylor	Big 12	At–Large	25–1
8	9	Washington	Pac-12	At–Large	24–6
9	6	Kentucky	SEC	Automatic	23–6
16	21	Purdue	Big Ten	At-Large	22–7
	189	Sacred Heart	NEC	Automatic	20−11
	29	Stephen F. Austin	Southland	Automatic	31−1
	28	USC	Pac-12	At–Large	17–13
	13	Marquette	Big East	At–Large	27–5
	42	Dayton	Atlantic 10	Automatic	22–8
	41	Wright State	Horizon	At-Large	24–5
	138	Southeast Missouri State	OVC	Automatic	23–10
	44	Northern Kentucky	Horizon	Automatic	19–12
	39	Michigan	Big Ten	At–Large	20−10
	36	Colorado State	MWC	Automatic	29−1
	43	South Carolina	SEC	At-Large	19–11
	77	Winthrop	Big South	Automatic	24−4

Stanford Regional
Seed	RPI	School	Conference	Berth Type	Record
3	3	Stanford	Pac-12	Automatic	24–4
6	4	Pittsburgh	ACC	Automatic	29–1
11	16	Penn State	Big Ten	At-Large	24−5
14	17	BYU	WCC	At-Large	25–4
	75	Denver	Summit	Automatic	23–8
	31	Georgia	SEC	At–Large	20–9
	37	Cal Poly	Big West	At-Large	20−8
	18	Utah	Pac-12	At–Large	22–9
	50	Illinois	Big Ten	At–Large	16–13
	59	New Mexico State	WAC	Automatic	27–3
	76	Princeton	Ivy League	Automatic	17–7
	53	American	Patriot	Automatic	24–7
	35	Towson	CAA	Automatic	28–2
	22	Cincinnati	American	At-Large	25–6
	47	VCU	Atlantic 10	At-Large	24–6
	194	Howard	MEAC	Automatic	20–12

Austin Regional
Seed	RPI	School	Conference	Berth Type	Record
2	2	Texas	Big 12	Automatic	21–3
7	10	Minnesota	Big Ten	At-Large	23–5
10	7	Florida	SEC	At-Large	24–4
15	15	Western Kentucky	C-USA	Automatic	31−1
	110	Fairfield	MAAC	Automatic	24–5
	46	Iowa State	Big 12	At–Large	17–11
	20	Creighton	Big East	At–Large	24–5
	24	UCF	American	Automatic	24–7
	36	Florida State	ACC	At–Large	19–9
	311	Alabama State	SWAC	Automatic	17–21
	68	Kennesaw State	Atlantic Sun	Automatic	22–8
	51	Samford	SoCon	Automatic	24–5
	25	Louisville	ACC	At–Large	19–9
	34	UC Santa Barbara	Big West	At–Large	22–5
	30	Texas State	Sun Belt	Automatic	24–8
	151	Albany	American East	Automatic	16–10

Madison Regional
Seed	RPI	School	Conference	Berth Type	Record
4	5	Wisconsin	Big Ten	Automatic	22–6
5	8	Nebraska	Big Ten	At-Large	25–4
12	11	Hawaii	Big West	Automatic	24–3
13	12	Texas A&M	SEC	At-Large	21–7
	83	Ball State	MAC	Automatic	20−11
	40	Northern Iowa	MVC	At-Large	24–10
	19	Missouri	SEC	At-Large	21–7
	26	San Diego	WCC	Automatic	24–5
	49	Washington State	Pac-12	At-Large	23–9
	74	Northern Colorado	Big Sky	Automatic	26–7
	60	St. John's	Big East	Automatic	22–11
	33	Oklahoma	Big 12	At–Large	19–8
	14	Rice	C-USA	At–Large	26–3
	27	UCLA	Pac-12	At–Large	18–11
	32	Notre Dame	ACC	At–Large	19–9
	78	Illinois State	MVC	Automatic	22–11

== Bracket ==
=== Baylor Regional ===
First round
1	Baylor	3
Sacred Heart	0
Waco, TX
Stephen F. Austin	0
USC	3
Marquette	3
Dayton	0
West Lafayette, IN
Wright State	0
16	Purdue	3
9	Kentucky	3
Southeast Missouri St.	0
Lexington, KY
Northern Kentucky	0
Michigan	3
Colorado State	2
South Carolina	3
Seattle, WA
Winthrop	0
8	Washington	3

Second round
1	Baylor	3
USC	0
Marquette	1
16	Purdue	3
9	Kentucky	3
Michigan	0
South Carolina	0
8	Washington	3

Regional semifinals
1	Baylor	3
16	Purdue	1
9	Kentucky	1
8	Washington	3

Regional finals
1	Baylor	3
8	Washington	1

=== Schedule ===
==== First round ====
December 6, 2019; 4:30 PM EST	Dayton	0–3	Marquette	Holloway Gymnasium, West Lafayette, Indiana; Attendance: 2,415
December 6, 2019; 4:30 PM EST	(23–25, 19–25, 22–25); Report			Holloway Gymnasium, West Lafayette, Indiana; Attendance: 2,415

December 6, 2019; 5:00 PM CST	Stephen F. Austin	0–3	USC	Ferrell Center, Waco, Texas; Attendance: 150; Referees: Steve Robb, April Fricke
December 6, 2019; 5:00 PM CST	(18–25, 19–25, 16–25); Report			Ferrell Center, Waco, Texas; Attendance: 150; Referees: Steve Robb, April Fricke

December 6, 2019; 5:00 PM EST	Northern Kentucky	0–3	Michigan	Memorial Coliseum, Lexington, Kentucky; Attendance: 2,746; Referees: Wade Brence, Michael O'Connor
December 6, 2019; 5:00 PM EST	(22–25, 15–25, 22–25); Report			Memorial Coliseum, Lexington, Kentucky; Attendance: 2,746; Referees: Wade Brence, Michael O'Connor

December 6, 2019; 5:00 PM PST	South Carolina	3–2	Colorado State	Hec Edmundson Pavilion, Seattle, Washington; Attendance: 2,052; Referees: Paula Martin, Bill Forrester
December 6, 2019; 5:00 PM PST	(27–25, 17–25, 25–22, 14–25, 18–16); Report			Hec Edmundson Pavilion, Seattle, Washington; Attendance: 2,052; Referees: Paula Martin, Bill Forrester

December 6, 2019; 7:00 PM EST	Wright State	0–3	Purdue	Holloway Gymnasium, West Lafayette, Indiana; Attendance: 2,327
December 6, 2019; 7:00 PM EST	(9–25, 22–25, 11–25); Report			Holloway Gymnasium, West Lafayette, Indiana; Attendance: 2,327

December 6, 2019; 7:00 PM CST	Sacred Heart	0–3	Baylor	Ferrell Center, Waco, Texas; Attendance: 1,918; Referees: Richard Bleau, Stephen Shepherd
December 6, 2019; 7:00 PM CST	(20–25, 18–25, 8–25); Report			Ferrell Center, Waco, Texas; Attendance: 1,918; Referees: Richard Bleau, Stephen Shepherd

December 6, 2019; 7:30 PM EST	Southeast Missouri St.	0–3	Kentucky	Memorial Coliseum, Lexington, Kentucky; Attendance: 2,746; Referees: Kevin Wendelboe, Christina Fiebich
December 6, 2019; 7:30 PM EST	(20–25, 15–25, 19–25); Report			Memorial Coliseum, Lexington, Kentucky; Attendance: 2,746; Referees: Kevin Wendelboe, Christina Fiebich

December 6, 2019; 7:30 PM PST	Winthrop	0–3	Washington	Hec Edmundson Pavilion, Seattle, Washington; Attendance: 2,052; Referees: Margie Ray, Bill Forrester
December 6, 2019; 7:30 PM PST	(23–25, 10–25, 10–25); Report			Hec Edmundson Pavilion, Seattle, Washington; Attendance: 2,052; Referees: Margie Ray, Bill Forrester

==== Second round ====
December 7, 2019; 7:00 PM EST	Michigan	0–3	Kentucky	Memorial Coliseum, Lexington, Kentucky; Attendance: 2,748; Referees: Kevin Wendelboe, Christina Fiebich
December 7, 2019; 7:00 PM EST	(19–25, 19–25, 20–25); Report			Memorial Coliseum, Lexington, Kentucky; Attendance: 2,748; Referees: Kevin Wendelboe, Christina Fiebich

December 7, 2019; 7:00 PM EST	Marquette	1–3	Purdue	Holloway Gymnasium, West Lafayette, Indiana; Attendance: 2,275
December 7, 2019; 7:00 PM EST	(25–22, 16–25, 17–25, 13–25); Report			Holloway Gymnasium, West Lafayette, Indiana; Attendance: 2,275

December 7, 2019; 7:00 PM PST	South Carolina	0–3	Washington	Hec Edmundson Pavilion, Seattle, Washington; Attendance: 2,004; Referees: Paula Martin, Margie Ray
December 7, 2019; 7:00 PM PST	(23–25, 24–26, 8–25); Report			Hec Edmundson Pavilion, Seattle, Washington; Attendance: 2,004; Referees: Paula Martin, Margie Ray

December 7, 2019; 8:00 PM CST	USC	0–3	Baylor	Ferrell Center, Waco, Texas; Attendance: 1,670; Referees: Richard Bleau, Stephen Shepherd
December 7, 2019; 8:00 PM CST	(23–25, 17–25, 22–25); Report			Ferrell Center, Waco, Texas; Attendance: 1,670; Referees: Richard Bleau, Stephen Shepherd

==== Regional semifinals ====
December 13, 2019; 1:30 PM CST	Kentucky	1–3	Washington	Ferrell Center, Waco, Texas; Attendance: 1,848; Referees: Devonie McLarty, Patsy Malta
December 13, 2019; 1:30 PM CST	(16–25, 24–26, 25–15, 22–25); Report			Ferrell Center, Waco, Texas; Attendance: 1,848; Referees: Devonie McLarty, Patsy Malta

December 13, 2019; 11:00 AM CST	Purdue	1–3	Baylor	Ferrell Center, Waco, Texas; Attendance: 1,848; Referees: Chad Klunck, Stephen Shepherd
December 13, 2019; 11:00 AM CST	(12–25, 25–23, 15−25, 17–25); Report			Ferrell Center, Waco, Texas; Attendance: 1,848; Referees: Chad Klunck, Stephen Shepherd

==== Regional final ====
December 14, 2019; 3:00 PM CST	Washington	1–3	Baylor	Ferrell Center, Waco, Texas; Attendance: 3,008; Referees: Devonie McLarty, Stephen Shepherd
December 14, 2019; 3:00 PM CST	(20–25, 25–21, 19–25, 18–25); Report			Ferrell Center, Waco, Texas; Attendance: 3,008; Referees: Devonie McLarty, Stephen Shepherd

=== Wisconsin Regional ===
First round
5	Nebraska	3
Ball State	0
Lincoln, NE
Northern Iowa	0
Missouri	3
San Diego	3
Washington State	1
Honolulu, HI
Northern Colorado	1
12	Hawai'i	3
13	Texas A&M	3
St. John's	0
College Station, TX
Oklahoma	0
Rice	3
UCLA	3
Notre Dame	0
Madison, WI
Illinois State	0
4	Wisconsin	3

Second round
5	Nebraska	3
Missouri	1
San Diego	0
12	Hawai'i	3
13	Texas A&M	3
Rice	1
UCLA	0
4	Wisconsin	3

Regional semifinals
5	Nebraska	3
12	Hawai'i	0
13	Texas A&M	0
4	Wisconsin	3

Regional finals
5	Nebraska	0
4	Wisconsin	3

=== Schedule ===
==== First round ====
December 5, 2019; 4:30 PM CST	Oklahoma	0–3	Rice	Reed Arena, College Station, Texas; Attendance: 1,353; Referees: Keith Murlless, Thang Nguyen
December 5, 2019; 4:30 PM CST	(18–25, 22–25, 19–25); Report			Reed Arena, College Station, Texas; Attendance: 1,353; Referees: Keith Murlless, Thang Nguyen

December 5, 2019; 6:30 PM CST	St. John's	0–3	Texas A&M	Reed Arena, College Station, Texas; Attendance: 2,085; Referees: Dan Houser, Lena Gustafson
December 5, 2019; 6:30 PM CST	(25–27, 21–25, 12–25); Report			Reed Arena, College Station, Texas; Attendance: 2,085; Referees: Dan Houser, Lena Gustafson

December 6, 2019; 4:30 PM CST	Northern Iowa	0–3	Missouri	Devaney Center, Lincoln, Nebraska; Referees: Bill Stanley, Mary Faragher
December 6, 2019; 4:30 PM CST	(11–25, 13–25, 14–25); Report			Devaney Center, Lincoln, Nebraska; Referees: Bill Stanley, Mary Faragher

December 6, 2019; 4:30 PM CST	Notre Dame	0–3	UCLA	Wisconsin Field House, Madison, Wisconsin
December 6, 2019; 4:30 PM CST	(16–25, 19–25, 20–25); Report			Wisconsin Field House, Madison, Wisconsin

December 6, 2019; 7:00 PM CST	Ball State	0–3	Nebraska	Devaney Center, Lincoln, Nebraska; Attendance: 8,204; Referees: Mike Hamilton, Jim Werner
December 6, 2019; 7:00 PM CST	(13–25, 18–25, 10–25); Report			Devaney Center, Lincoln, Nebraska; Attendance: 8,204; Referees: Mike Hamilton, Jim Werner

December 6, 2019; 7:00 PM CST	Illinois State	0–3	Wisconsin	Wisconsin Field House, Madison, Wisconsin; Attendance: 7,052; Referees: Tim Harlow, Brett Myres
December 6, 2019; 7:00 PM CST	(13–25, 14–25, 24–26); Report			Wisconsin Field House, Madison, Wisconsin; Attendance: 7,052; Referees: Tim Harlow, Brett Myres

December 6, 2019; 4:30 PM HST	Washington State	1–3	San Diego	Stan Sheriff Center, Honolulu, Hawaii
December 6, 2019; 4:30 PM HST	(21–25, 25–22, 19–25, 14–25); Report			Stan Sheriff Center, Honolulu, Hawaii

December 6, 2019; 7:00 PM HST	Northern Colorado	1–3	Hawaii	Stan Sheriff Center, Honolulu, Hawaii; Attendance: 7,818
December 6, 2019; 7:00 PM HST	(24–26, 26–24, 8–25, 15–25); Report			Stan Sheriff Center, Honolulu, Hawaii; Attendance: 7,818

==== Second round ====
December 6, 2019; 6:30 PM CST	Rice	1–3	Texas A&M	Reed Arena, College Station, Texas; Attendance: 2,176; Referees: Keith Murlless, Lena Gustafson
December 6, 2019; 6:30 PM CST	(28–26, 30–32, 20–25, 15–25); Report			Reed Arena, College Station, Texas; Attendance: 2,176; Referees: Keith Murlless, Lena Gustafson

December 7, 2019; 6:00 PM CST	UCLA	0–3	Wisconsin	Wisconsin Field House, Madison, Wisconsin; Attendance: 7,052; Referees: Devonie McLarty
December 7, 2019; 6:00 PM CST	(18–25, 21–25, 14–25); Report			Wisconsin Field House, Madison, Wisconsin; Attendance: 7,052; Referees: Devonie McLarty

December 7, 2019; 7:00 PM CST	Missouri	1–3	Nebraska	Devaney Center, Lincoln, Nebraska; Attendance: 8,091; Referees: Bill Stanley, Mary Faragher
December 7, 2019; 7:00 PM CST	(25–20, 20–25, 30–32, 18–25); Report			Devaney Center, Lincoln, Nebraska; Attendance: 8,091; Referees: Bill Stanley, Mary Faragher

December 7, 2019; 7:00 PM HST	San Diego	0–3	Hawai'i	Stan Sheriff Center, Honolulu, Hawaii; Attendance: 8,058
December 7, 2019; 7:00 PM HST	(23–25, 21–25, 21–25); Report			Stan Sheriff Center, Honolulu, Hawaii; Attendance: 8,058

==== Regional semifinals ====
December 13, 2019; 1:00 PM CST	Texas A&M	0–3	Wisconsin	Wisconsin Field House, Madison, Wisconsin; Attendance: 7,052; Referees: Suzanne Lowry, Robyn Courchane
December 13, 2019; 1:00 PM CST	(20–25, 17–25, 23–25); Report			Wisconsin Field House, Madison, Wisconsin; Attendance: 7,052; Referees: Suzanne Lowry, Robyn Courchane

December 13, 2019; 3:30 PM CST	Hawaii	0–3	Nebraska	Wisconsin Field House, Madison, Wisconsin; Attendance: 7,052
December 13, 2019; 3:30 PM CST	(27–29, 22–25, 19–25); Report			Wisconsin Field House, Madison, Wisconsin; Attendance: 7,052

==== Regional final ====
December 14, 2019; 5:00 PM CST	Nebraska	0–3	Wisconsin	Wisconsin Field House, Madison, Wisconsin; Attendance: 7,052; Referees: Bill Stanley, Margie Ray
December 14, 2019; 5:00 PM CST	(18–25, 22–25, 19–25); Report			Wisconsin Field House, Madison, Wisconsin; Attendance: 7,052; Referees: Bill Stanley, Margie Ray

=== Stanford Regional ===
First round
3	Stanford	3
Denver	0
Stanford, CA
Georgia	2
Cal Poly	3
Utah	3
Illinois	2
Provo, UT
New Mexico State	0
14	BYU	3
11	Penn State	3
Princeton	0
University Park, PA
American	2
Towson	3
Cincinnati	3
VCU	1
Pittsburgh, PA
Howard	0
6	Pittsburgh	3

Second round
3	Stanford	3
Cal Poly	0
Utah	3
14	BYU	0
11	Penn State	3
Towson	1
Cincinnati	3
6	Pittsburgh	2

Regional semifinals
3	Stanford	3
Utah	2
11	Penn State	3
Cincinnati	2

Regional finals
3	Stanford	3
11	Penn State	0

=== Schedule ===
==== First round ====
December 6, 2019; 7:00 PM PST	Denver	0–3	Stanford	Maples Pavilion, Stanford, California; Attendance: 2,148; Referees: Donna Hess, Brig Beatie
December 6, 2019; 7:00 PM PST	(20–25, 11–25, 15–25); Report			Maples Pavilion, Stanford, California; Attendance: 2,148; Referees: Donna Hess, Brig Beatie

==== Second round ====
December 7, 2019; 6:00 PM PST	Cal Poly	0–3	Stanford	Maples Pavilion, Stanford, California; Attendance: 2,326; Referees: Sergio Gonzalez, Brig Beatie
December 7, 2019; 6:00 PM PST	(13–25, 16–25, 17–25); Report			Maples Pavilion, Stanford, California; Attendance: 2,326; Referees: Sergio Gonzalez, Brig Beatie

==== Regional semifinals ====
December 13, 2019; 8:00 PM PST	Utah	2–3	Stanford	Maples Pavilion, Stanford, California; Attendance: 2,609; Referees: Kevin Cull, Kaili Kimura
December 13, 2019; 8:00 PM PST	(25–22, 14–25, 10–25, 25–12, 11–15); Report			Maples Pavilion, Stanford, California; Attendance: 2,609; Referees: Kevin Cull, Kaili Kimura

==== Regional final ====
December 14, 2019; 7:00 PM PST	Penn State	0–3	Stanford	Maples Pavilion, Stanford, California; Attendance: 2,946; Referees: Kevin Cull, Kaili Kimura
December 14, 2019; 7:00 PM PST	(22–25, 15–25, 17–25); Report			Maples Pavilion, Stanford, California; Attendance: 2,946; Referees: Kevin Cull, Kaili Kimura

=== Texas Regional ===
First round
7	Minnesota	3
Fairfield	0
Minneapolis, MN
Iowa State	0
Creighton	3
UCF	3
Florida State	2
Gainesville, FL
Alabama State	0
10	Florida	3
15	Western Kentucky	3
Kennesaw State	0
Bowling Green, KY
Samford	0
Louisville	3
UC Santa Barbara	3
Texas State	1
Austin, TX
Albany	0
2	Texas	3

Second round
7	Minnesota	3
Creighton	2
UCF	0
10	Florida	3
15	Western Kentucky	2
Louisville	3
UC Santa Barbara	2
2	Texas	3

Regional semifinals
7	Minnesota	3
10	Florida	2
Louisville	3
2	Texas	2

Regional finals
7	Minnesota	3
Louisville	0

=== Schedule ===
==== First round ====
December 5, 2019; 4:30 PM EST	Florida State	2–3	UCF	Exactech Arena, Gainesville, Florida; Attendance: 560; Referees: Suzanne Lowry, Darin Clark
December 5, 2019; 4:30 PM EST	(19–25, 25–20, 25–20, 18–25, 8–15); Report			Exactech Arena, Gainesville, Florida; Attendance: 560; Referees: Suzanne Lowry, Darin Clark

December 5, 2019; 4:30 PM CST	Texas State	1–3	UC Santa Barbara	Gregory Gymnasium, Austin, Texas; Attendance: 3,532; Referees: Gary Houghton, Joe Lizama
December 5, 2019; 4:30 PM CST	(21–25, 21–25, 25–20, 14–25); Report			Gregory Gymnasium, Austin, Texas; Attendance: 3,532; Referees: Gary Houghton, Joe Lizama

December 5, 2019; 6:00 PM EST	Samford	0–3	Louisville	E. A. Diddle Arena, Bowling Green, Kentucky; Attendance: 4,514; Referees: Marty Prochko, Bill Thornburgh
December 5, 2019; 6:00 PM EST	(21–25, 12–25, 22–25); Report			E. A. Diddle Arena, Bowling Green, Kentucky; Attendance: 4,514; Referees: Marty Prochko, Bill Thornburgh

December 5, 2019; 7:00 PM EST	Alabama State	0–3	Florida	Exactech Arena, Gainesville, Florida; Attendance: 2,022; Referees: Mark Prater, Jim Fales
December 5, 2019; 7:00 PM EST	(10–25, 16–25, 20–25); Report			Exactech Arena, Gainesville, Florida; Attendance: 2,022; Referees: Mark Prater, Jim Fales

December 5, 2019; 7:00 PM CST	Albany	0–3	Texas	Gregory Gymnasium, Austin, Texas; Attendance: 3,532; Referees: Chad Klunck, Janna Ter Molen
December 5, 2019; 7:00 PM CST	(9–25, 16–25, 15–25); Report			Gregory Gymnasium, Austin, Texas; Attendance: 3,532; Referees: Chad Klunck, Janna Ter Molen

December 5, 2019; 8:00 PM EST	Kennesaw State	0–3	Western Kentucky	E. A. Diddle Arena, Bowling Green, Kentucky; Attendance: 4,514; Referees: Michelle Prater, Donnie Goodwin
December 5, 2019; 8:00 PM EST	(23–25, 20–25, 23–25); Report			E. A. Diddle Arena, Bowling Green, Kentucky; Attendance: 4,514; Referees: Michelle Prater, Donnie Goodwin

December 6, 2019; 4:30 PM CST	Iowa State	0–3	Creighton	Maturi Pavilion, Minneapolis, Minnesota; Attendance: 3,956; Referees: Julie Voeck, Robyn Courchane
December 6, 2019; 4:30 PM CST	(22–25, 15–25, 19–25); Report			Maturi Pavilion, Minneapolis, Minnesota; Attendance: 3,956; Referees: Julie Voeck, Robyn Courchane

December 6, 2019; 7:00 PM CST	Fairfield	0–3	Minnesota	Maturi Pavilion, Minneapolis, Minnesota; Attendance: 3,956; Referees: Brad Aaberg, Todd Karolczak
December 6, 2019; 7:00 PM CST	(13–25, 14–25, 11–25); Report			Maturi Pavilion, Minneapolis, Minnesota; Attendance: 3,956; Referees: Brad Aaberg, Todd Karolczak

==== Second round ====
December 6, 2019; 7:00 PM EST	UCF	0–3	Florida	Exactech Arena, Gainesville, Florida; Attendance: 2,412; Referees: Suzanne Lowry, Darin Clark
December 6, 2019; 7:00 PM EST	(21–25, 18–25, 17–25); Report			Exactech Arena, Gainesville, Florida; Attendance: 2,412; Referees: Suzanne Lowry, Darin Clark

December 6, 2019; 7:00 PM CST	UC Santa Barbara	2–3	Texas	Gregory Gymnasium, Austin, Texas; Attendance: 3,767; Referees: Chad Klunck, Janna Ter Molen
December 6, 2019; 7:00 PM CST	(22–25, 25–19, 25–18, 18–25, 10–15); Report			Gregory Gymnasium, Austin, Texas; Attendance: 3,767; Referees: Chad Klunck, Janna Ter Molen

December 6, 2019; 8:00 PM EST	Louisville	3–2	Western Kentucky	E. A. Diddle Arena, Bowling Green, Kentucky; Attendance: 5,023; Referees: Michelle Prater, Bill Thornburgh
December 6, 2019; 8:00 PM EST	(21–25, 25–21, 25–22, 21–25, 15–5); Report			E. A. Diddle Arena, Bowling Green, Kentucky; Attendance: 5,023; Referees: Michelle Prater, Bill Thornburgh

December 7, 2019; 8:00 PM CST	Creighton	2–3	Minnesota	Maturi Pavilion, Minneapolis, Minnesota; Attendance: 4,003; Referees: Brad Aaberg, Robyn Courchane
December 7, 2019; 8:00 PM CST	(13–25, 25–19, 25–15, 24–26, 10–15); Report			Maturi Pavilion, Minneapolis, Minnesota; Attendance: 4,003; Referees: Brad Aaberg, Robyn Courchane

==== Regional semifinals ====
December 13, 2019; 3:00 PM CST	Louisville	3–2	Texas	Gregory Gymnasium, Austin, Texas; Attendance: 4,137; Referees: Brad Aaberg, Daphne Nelson
December 13, 2019; 3:00 PM CST	(25−22, 25–22, 17–25, 18–25, 15–12); Report			Gregory Gymnasium, Austin, Texas; Attendance: 4,137; Referees: Brad Aaberg, Daphne Nelson

December 13, 2019; 5:30 PM CST	Florida	2–3	Minnesota	Gregory Gymnasium, Austin, Texas; Attendance: 4,137; Referees: Michelle Prater, Darin Clark
December 13, 2019; 5:30 PM CST	(25–23, 14–25, 25–16, 15–25, 11–15); Report			Gregory Gymnasium, Austin, Texas; Attendance: 4,137; Referees: Michelle Prater, Darin Clark

==== Regional final ====
December 14, 2019; 7:00 PM CST	Louisville	0–3	Minnesota	Gregory Gymnasium, Austin, Texas; Attendance: 3,915; Referees: Michelle Prater, Daphne Nelson
December 14, 2019; 7:00 PM CST	(21–25, 14–25, 16–25); Report			Gregory Gymnasium, Austin, Texas; Attendance: 3,915; Referees: Michelle Prater, Daphne Nelson

== Final four ==
National semifinals
1	Baylor	1
4	Wisconsin	3
3	Stanford	3
7	Minnesota	0

National Championship
4	Wisconsin	0
3	Stanford	3

=== National semifinals ===
December 19, 2019; 7:00 PM	Wisconsin	3–1	Baylor	PPG Paints Arena, Pittsburgh, Pennsylvania; Attendance: 14,661; Referees: Michelle Prater, Stephen Shepherd
December 19, 2019; 7:00 PM	(25–27, 25−21, 25–17, 25−19); Report			PPG Paints Arena, Pittsburgh, Pennsylvania; Attendance: 14,661; Referees: Michelle Prater, Stephen Shepherd

December 19, 2019; 9:30 PM	Minnesota	0–3	Stanford	PPG Paints Arena, Pittsburgh, Pennsylvania; Attendance: 14,661; Referees: Devonie McLarty, Daphne Nelson
December 19, 2019; 9:30 PM	(19–25, 22−25, 22–25); Report			PPG Paints Arena, Pittsburgh, Pennsylvania; Attendance: 14,661; Referees: Devonie McLarty, Daphne Nelson

=== National Championship ===
December 21, 2019; 8:00 PM	Wisconsin	0–3	Stanford	PPG Paints Arena, Pittsburgh, Pennsylvania; Attendance: 16,290; Referees: Michelle Prater, Daphne Nelson
December 21, 2019; 8:00 PM	(16–25, 17–25, 20–25); Report			PPG Paints Arena, Pittsburgh, Pennsylvania; Attendance: 16,290; Referees: Michelle Prater, Daphne Nelson

==== Final Four All-Tournament Team ====
- Kathryn Plummer – Stanford (Most Outstanding Player)
- Morgan Hentz – Stanford
- Jenna Gray – Stanford
- Dana Rettke – Wisconsin
- Molly Haggerty – Wisconsin
- Yossiana Pressley – Baylor
- Alexis Hart – Minnesota

== Media Coverage ==
First and second round matches will be streamed or televised by local school RSN's or streaming services. The 3rd round to the finals will all be streamed by WatchESPN or televised by ESPN Networks.

First & Second Rounds

- Spencer Linton & Amy Gant – Provo, Utah (BYUtv)

Regional semifinals & Regional Finals

- Paul Sunderland & Karch Kiraly– Madison, Wisconsin
- Sam Gore & Kate George – Waco, Texas

National semifinals

- Paul Sunderland, Karch Kiraly, & Holly Rowe – Pittsburgh, Pennsylvania

First & Second Rounds

- Paul Sunderland, Karch Kiraly, & Holly Rowe – Austin, Texas (LHN)

Regional semifinals & Regional Finals

- Courtney Lyle & Salima Rockwell – Austin, Texas
- Tiffany Greene & Missy Whittemore – Stanford, California

National Championship

- Paul Sunderland, Karch Kiraly, & Holly Rowe – Pittsburgh, Pennsylvania

== NCAA tournament record ==
There is one NCAA tournament record that was set in the 2019 tournament:

- Hitting percentage, tournament (individual record, minimum 75 attempts) — Madeleine Gates, Stanford University — .563% (5—0/12 vs. Denver, 7—0/11 vs. Cal Poly, 8—0/14 vs. Utah, 11—0/15 vs. Penn State, 5—0/11 vs. Minnesota, 10—1/17 vs. Wisconsin.)
