= Sarah Baldwin =

American volleyball coach

Current position
- Title: Head coach
- Team: Lipscomb Bisons
- Conference: ASUN
- Record: 20–5 (.800) overall 13–2 (.867) ASUN

Biographical details
- Born: Honolulu, Hawaii, U.S.
- Education: Texas (BA, 2014)

Playing career
- 2010–2013: Texas
- Position: Libero

Coaching career (HC unless noted)
- 2016–2021: Southwestern (assistant)
- 2021–2022: Holy Cross (assistant)
- 2023–2025: Lipscomb (assistant)
- 2026–present: Lipscomb

Head coaching record
- Overall: 20–5 (.800)

Accomplishments and honors

Championships
- ASUN regular-season champion (2026, outright, as coach); NCAA Division I national champion (2012, as player, starting libero); 3× Big 12 champion (2011–2013, as player); 3× Hawaii Division II state champion (2007–2009, as player)

Awards
- 2× Gatorade Hawaii Volleyball Player of the Year (2008–09, 2009–10, as player); 2× Honolulu Star-Bulletin Girls Volleyball Player of the Year (2008, 2009, as player); Honolulu Advertiser All-State Player of the Year (2009, as player); 3× Academic All-Big 12 First Team (2011–2013, as player); NCAA Division III Final Four (2016, as coach)

Sarah Baldwin (née Palmer) is an American volleyball coach and former college and pro player. She has been head coach of the Lipscomb Bisons women's volleyball team since January 2026. Baldwin played libero at the University of Texas at Austin from 2010 to 2013 and was a starter on the Division 1 Texas program that won the 2012 NCAA Division I national championship. The university's 2026 volleyball record book lists multiple all-time records including her at sixth in school history with 1,333 career digs, tenth in career digs per set at 3.16, and tenth in single-season digs per set at 3.76 in 2013.

== Early life ==
Baldwin grew up in Kailua, Hawaii, and attended Hawaii Baptist Academy in Honolulu. She played outside hitter in high school and helped the school win three consecutive Hawaii Division II state championships between 2007 and 2009.

She was the Gatorade Hawaii Volleyball Player of the Year award for both the 2008–09 and 2009–10 seasons. The Honolulu Star-Bulletin chose her as its girls volleyball player of the year in 2008 and 2009. She was also the 2009 All-State Player of the Year according to The Honolulu Advertiser. Baldwin was a high school All-American in 2010.

Baldwin signed a national letter of intent to play for Texas in November 2009.

== Playing career ==
=== University of Texas at Austin ===
From 2010 to 2013, Baldwin (Palmer) played for the Texas Longhorns under head coach Jerritt Elliott. She was a four year starter. Baldwin (Palmer) led Texas in digs in 2010, 2012 and 2013. Texas won the Big 12 Conference championship in each of her final three seasons and reached the NCAA national semifinals in 2010, 2012 and 2013.

=== 2012 national championship ===
In the 2012 NCAA national semifinal against Michigan, Baldwin (Palmer) had a career-high 31 digs as Texas won in five sets. Two days later the Longhorns defeated Oregon in straight sets to win the national championship. She helped lead Texas to its first NCAA title since 1988.

=== Final season and records ===
Baldwin (Palmer) played in every match during her senior season in 2013. She recorded 414 digs, an average of 3.76 per set, while also registering 91 assists and 11 service aces.A November 2013 article in the Austin American-Statesman examined the importance of her defensive play to Texas's offense. The Honolulu Star-Advertiser published a profile of her college career that August.

She finished college with 1,333 digs, 6th all time, and a career average of 3.16 digs per set, and 3.76 season record digs per set, both 10th all time. Baldwin (Palmer) was selected to the Academic All-Big 12 First Team in 2011, 2012 and 2013. She graduated from Texas in 2014 with a bachelor's degree in sociology and a minor in education.

== Coaching career ==
=== Lipscomb University ===
On January 27, 2026, Lipscomb named Baldwin its head coach. She became the program's second head coach and first female head coach since it joined NCAA Division I. Baldwin's first win as a college head coach came on August 28, 2026, when Lipscomb defeated Memphis in four sets at Allen Arena.

Baldwin's first season also saw Lipscomb finish with a 12–1 home record, tying the program's single-season record for home victories, while extending its streak to 20 consecutive winning seasons and securing its 22nd consecutive ASUN Tournament appearance. The Bisons also recorded their first victory over a Power Four conference opponent since 2023, defeating Florida State. Lipscomb led the ASUN Conference at #1 in five team statistical categories: hitting percentage, kills per set, assists per set, digs per set, and points per set.

In her inaugural season as head coach, Baldwin led Lipscomb to the outright 2026 ASUN Conference regular-season championship, securing the conference's No. 1 seed and the program's seventh conference-wide regular-season title. It was Lipscomb's first such championship since 2016; the program's spring 2021 title had been an ASUN North Division championship rather than a conference-wide regular-season championship. The Bisons finished the regular season 19–5 overall and 12–2 in conference play, securing sole possession of first place in the ASUN standings.

=== College of the Holy Cross ===
In July 2021, Baldwin was hired as an assistant coach at the College of the Holy Cross. She spent the 2021 and 2022 seasons with the Crusaders, working with pin hitters and liberos and overseeing recruiting and operations.

=== Southwestern University ===
Baldwin joined Southwestern University in Georgetown, Texas, as an assistant coach in 2016. She worked with the Pirates for five seasons, handling recruiting and team operations. Southwestern reached the NCAA Division III Final Four in her first season, and the program compiled a 113–42 record during her tenure.
