= Bailey Webster =

American volleyball player (born 1991)

Personal information
- Nationality: American
- Born: July 21, 1991 (age 35); Round Rock, Texas
- Hometown: Baltimore, Maryland
- Height: 6 ft 3 in (191 cm)
- Weight: 185 lb (84 kg)
- Spike: 120 in (306 cm)
- Block: 117 in (298 cm)
- Education: University of Texas

Volleyball information
- Position: Outside hitter

National team
2014	United States

Bailey Marie Webster (born July 21, 1991) is a former American female volleyball player. She was part of the United States women's national volleyball team in 2014 and played college volleyball at the University of Texas from 2009-2013.

At Texas she was a 2013 Volleyball Magazine All-America First Team and an AVCA Second-Team All-American.

She participated in the 2014 FIVB Volleyball World Grand Prix.
