= Haley Eckerman =

American volleyball player and coach (born 1992)

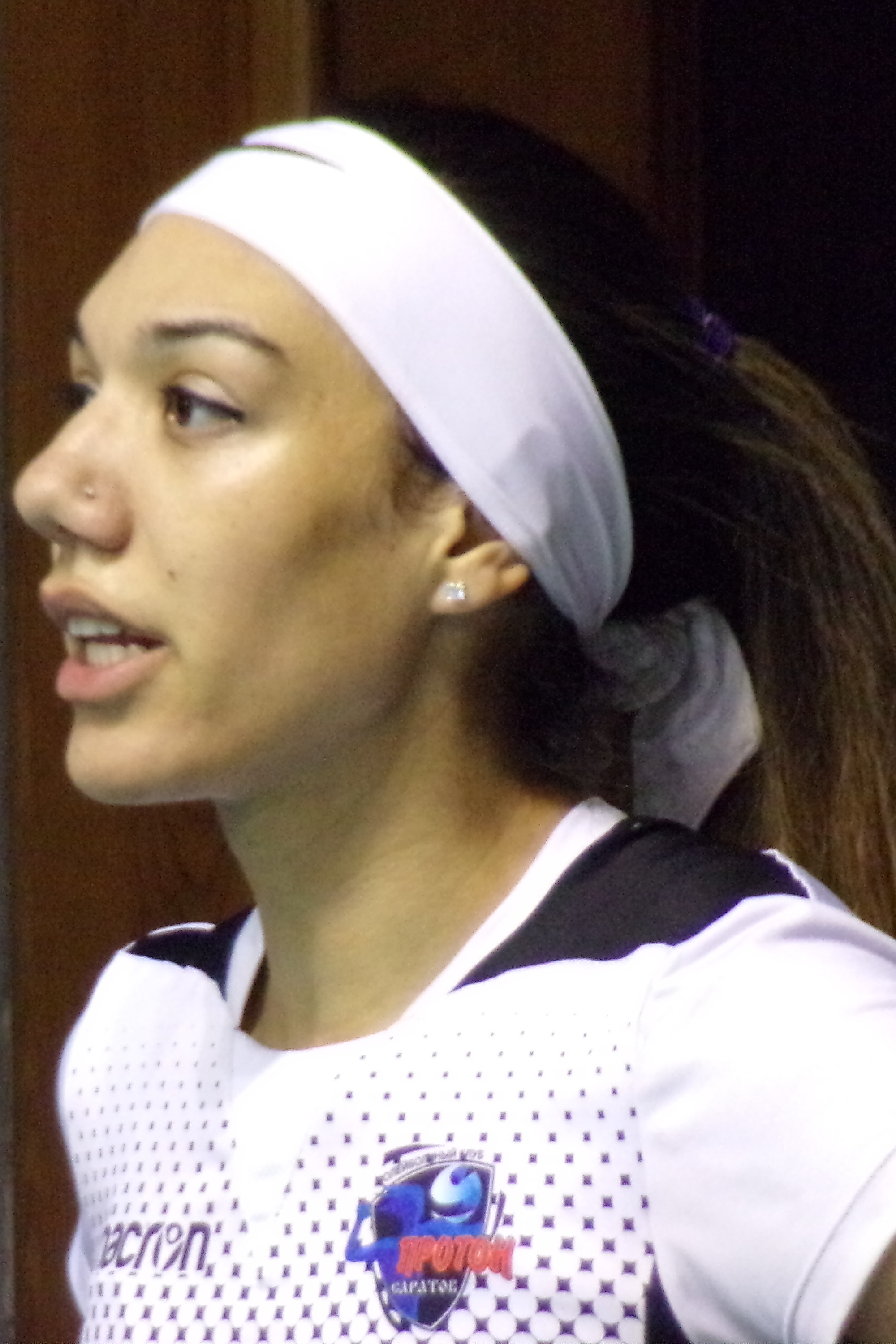

Personal information
- Born: November 10, 1992 (age 33) Waterloo, Iowa
- Height: 6 ft 3 in (191 cm)

Sport
- Sport: Volleyball
- University team: University of Texas at Austin

Haley Eckerman (10 November 1992) is an American volleyball player and coach. She played for the University of Texas at Austin, including on the squad that won the national title in 2012. She subsequently played abroad and is now the head coach at Kent State.

== Early life ==
As a high school athlete, Eckerman won honors including 2010 ESPN All-American, Prep Volleyball All American (2008, 2009, 2010), All-State Team (all four years), and Iowa 4A Player of the Year (three years), and led the state of Iowa in kills three years in a row. She also played on the United States Girls Youth National Team as well as the Junior Women's National Team. By her junior year, she was ranked the number 5 volleyball recruit in the United States with interest from most of the top programs in the nation. This was complicated by a pregnancy junior year; however Texas coach Jerritt Elliott told her that her scholarship would still be honored. Eckerman gave birth to her son in May 2010 and returned to play for her senior high school season and prepare for her collegiate debut. Eckerman's mother and grandparents moved with her from Iowa to Texas to assist with raising her son while she was in school.

During Eckerman's first year at Texas, as an outside hitter, she played all 6 rotations and started every game, with the team ultimately winning the 2012 Division 1 National Championship, Texas's first title in 20 years. Eckerman earned ESPN National Freshman of the Year, AVCA and Volleyball Magazine Freshman of the Year (making her the second player in Texas program history to do so), and earned Big 12 First Team honors. She returned her sophomore year, named to the 2012 Big 12 Preseason Team. She went on to be named ESPN Player of the Year (2012), 3x Big 12 Player of the Year in (2012, 2013, 2014), 2x AVCA First Team All American (2012, 2013), Big 12 First Team (2011, 2013, 2014), espn and Volleyball Magazine Player of the Year. Eckerman was named as one of the four finalists for the Honda Sports Award in volleyball for both 2013 and 2014. She also became the ninth player in Texas volleyball history to score 500 kills in one season.

== Career ==
After her senior year, Eckerman made a living by playing professionally overseas for GS Caltex in South Korea She played in a variety of countries including Russia, South Korea, Italy, Puerto Rico, and Azerbaijan. She continued her professional career until 2018 when she returned to the states to walk in the May graduation ceremony, though she had already received her diploma in the summer of 2017, earning a bachelor's degree in Applied Learning and Development. She then headed to her home state where she took on a high school head coaching position in the town of Waterloo, Iowa. Eckerman then served as the recruiting coordinator and assistant coach at Lamar University in Beaumont, Texas. In 2022 she took the head coaching position at Kent State in Ohio.
