= Baylor Bears women's volleyball =

College sports team in Waco, Texas, U.S.

- University: Baylor University
- Head coach: Ryan McGuyre (10th season)
- Conference: Big 12
- Location: Waco, Texas, US
- Home arena: Ferrell Center (capacity: 6,000)
- Nickname: Baylor Bears
- Colors: Green and gold

AIAW/NCAA tournament semifinal
- 2019

AIAW/NCAA Regional Final
- 2019

AIAW/NCAA regional semifinal
- 2009, 2019, 2020, 2021, 2022

AIAW/NCAA tournament appearance
- 1999, 2009, 2011, 2016, 2017, 2018, 2019, 2020, 2021, 2022, 2023, 2024

Conference regular season champion
- 2019

The Baylor Bears women's volleyball team represents Baylor University in National Collegiate Athletic Association (NCAA) Division I competition. The women's volleyball program at Baylor University began in 1978. Ryan McGuyre has been the coach since 2015. The team plays its home matches at Ferrell Center.

Baylor had historically used "Lady Bears" as its women's sports nickname, but over time all women's teams dropped "Lady". Volleyball was one of the last three holdouts, with the others being basketball and soccer; all three teams became simply "Bears" effective with the 2021–22 school year.

== Championships ==
=== Conference Championships ===
Season	Conference	Record	Head Coach
2019	Big 12 Conference	15–1	Ryan McGuyre

== Coaching staff ==
Name	Position coached	Consecutive season at Baylor in current position
Ryan McGuyre	Head Coach	10th
Joshua Walker	Assoc. Head Coach	2nd
Yajaira Cadet	Assistant Coach/Recruiting Coordinator	3rd
Jorge Peñate	Assistant Coach	2nd
Nicole O'Banon	Director of Operations	3rd

== See also ==
- List of NCAA Division I women's volleyball programs
