= Pete Waite =

American volleyball player and coach

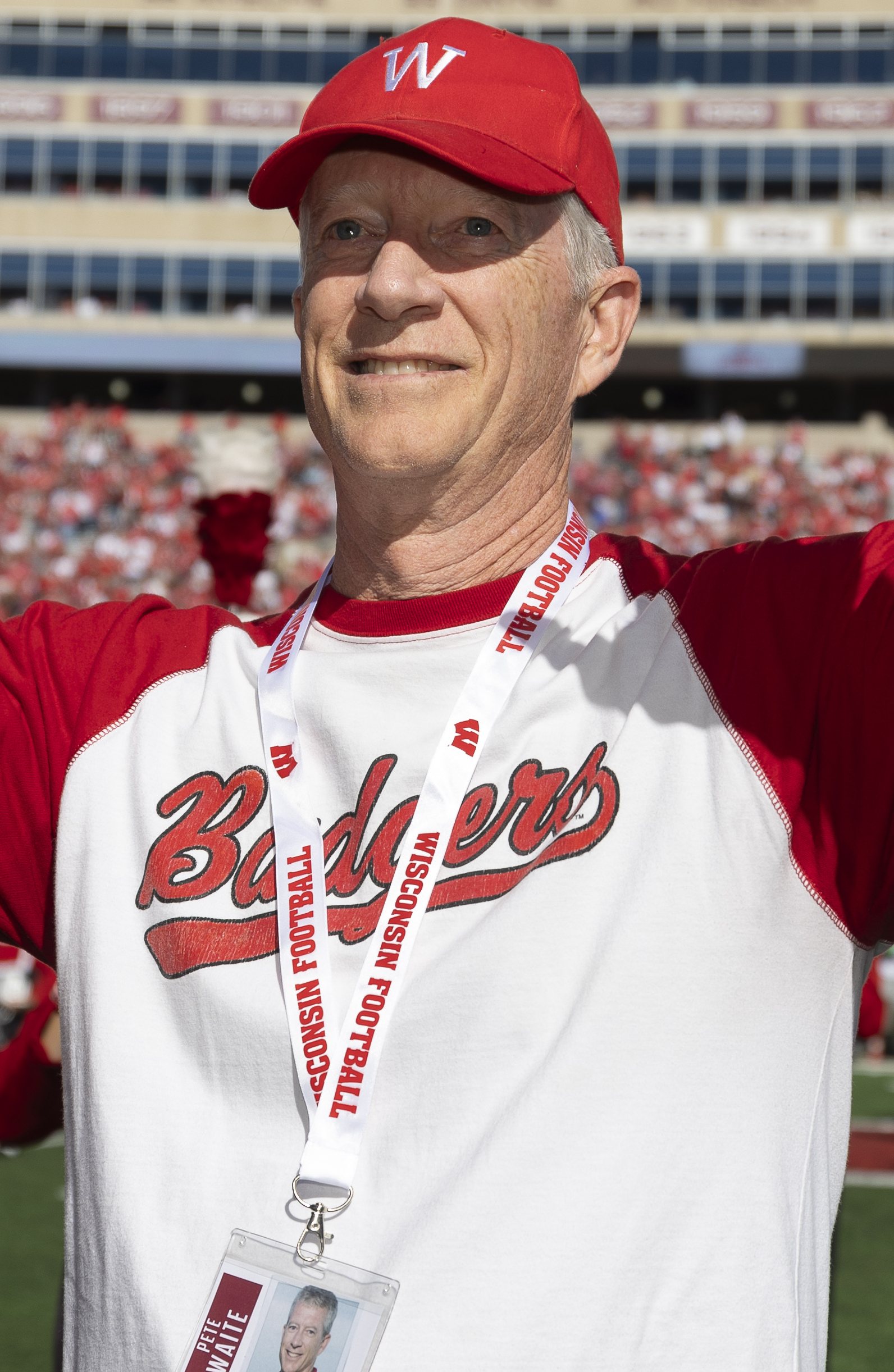
- Waite in 2024

Personal information
- Born: United States
- Hometown: Madison, Wisconsin United States
- Education: Ball State

Coaching information
- Current team: Retired.
Previous teams coached
Years	Teams
1984–1985; 1986–1987; 1988–1998; 1999–2012	Moraine Valley CC head coach Illinois State assistant coach Northern Illinois head coach Wisconsin head coach

Best results
Years
2000
2001
Location
NCAA National Championship
Big Ten Championship
Big Ten Championship
Result
2nd
1st
1st
- Last updated: August 7, 2008

William Peter Waite (known as Pete Waite) is an American volleyball coach and author, and is a former head coach for the women's volleyball team at Wisconsin.

== Early life ==
Waite is a graduate of Monona Grove High School in Madison, Wisconsin. He attended Ball State University from 1977 to 1981 and was a volleyball player there. Waite received All-MIVA honors his junior and senior years, and was named team co-captain and co-MVP in 1980. He received his bachelor's degree in education from Ball State in 1981.

== Coaching career ==
=== High school coaching ===
He started his coaching career in 1981 at Northside High School in Muncie, Indiana and spent the next year as a junior varsity coach at his alma mater, Monona Grove High School. Waite also coached one year at Bremen High School in Midlothian, Illinois.

=== 1984–85: Moraine Valley CC ===
Waite was the head coach at Moraine Valley Community College in Palos Hills, Illinois, leading the Cyclones to the 1985 North Central Community College Conference championship. Waite was named the conference coach of the year in 1985.

=== 1986–87: Assistant coach ===
Waite was the assistant coach of Illinois State University in Normal, Illinois.

=== 1988–98: Northern Illinois ===
Waite was the head coach at Northern Illinois University in DeKalb, Illinois, where he was the winningest volleyball coach in program history. He had an 11-year record of 266–102. NIU appeared in four NCAA tournaments under Waite.

NIU won eight regular-season conference titles and six conference tournaments under Waite. Individually, Waite coached four AVCA all-region players, four conference players of the year, 14 first-team all-conference honorees, one conference newcomer of the year and four members of the conference all-newcomer team

=== 1999–2012: Wisconsin ===
Waite is the all-time winningest volleyball coach in UW history, both in number of wins and winning percentage. Waite's teams made nine straight NCAA tournament appearances before missing the 2008 NCAA Tournament, snapping the streak.

Under Waite, Wisconsin has won two Big Ten titles (2000 and 2001) and finished as NCAA National Runners-up to Nebraska.

At Wisconsin, Waite has coached 11 All-Americans, 17 AVCA All-Region first-team selections, two Big Ten Players of the Year and 20 first-team All-Big Ten honorees.

On November 26, 2012, Waite announced his resignation as head coach.

== Books ==
- Waite wrote chapter 22 of the Volleyball Coaching Bible, entitled "Giving Players and Teams the Competitive Edge". (Copyright 2002)
- Waite published "Aggressive Volleyball", a 216-page book, in 2009.

== Honors and awards ==
- 2006 – Big Ten co-Coach of the Year
- 2001 – AVCA Mideast Region Coach of the Year, Big Ten Coach of the Year
- 2000 – AVCA Mideast Region Coach of the Year, Big Ten Coach of the Year
- 1997 – Mid-American Conference Coach of the Year
- 1993 – Mid-Continent Conference Coach of the Year
- 1992 – Mid-Continent Conference Coach of the Year
- 1985 – North Central Community College Coach of the Year
