= 2018 NCAA Division I women's volleyball rankings =

- Season: 2018
- Postseason: Single-elimination
- Preseason #1: Stanford

The 2018 NCAA Division I women's volleyball rankings is a human poll designated to rank the top 25 women's college volleyball programs at the NCAA Division I level. The official rankings recognized by the National Collegiate Athletic Association (NCAA) are determined by the American Volleyball Coaches Association (AVCA), and have released rankings for this competition since 1982. The rankings are updated weekly at the beginning of the season and finalized at the conclusion of the 2018 NCAA Division I women's volleyball tournament.

== Legend ==
Legend
	Increase in ranking
	Decrease in ranking
	Not ranked previous week
	Selected for NCAA Division I Tournament
Italics	Number of first place votes
(#–#)	Win–loss record
т	Tied with team above or below also with this symbol

== AVCA Coaches Poll ==
	Preseason Aug 8	Week 1 Aug 27	Week 2 Sep 3	Week 3 Sep 10	Week 4 Sep 17	Week 5 Sep 24	Week 6 Oct 1	Week 7 Oct 8	Week 8 Oct 15	Week 9 Oct 22	Week 10 Oct 29	Week 11 Nov 5	Week 12 Nov 12	Week 13 Nov 19	Week 14 Nov 26	Week 15 (Final) Dec 17	
1.	Stanford (43)	Stanford (1–0) (57)	Minnesota (5–0) (35)	BYU (8–0) (54)	BYU (10–0) (58)	BYU (12–0) (59)	BYU (15–0) (60)	BYU (16–0) (60)	BYU (18–0) (60)	BYU (20–0) (58)	BYU (22–0) (52)	BYU (23–0) (52)	BYU (25–0) (48)	BYU (27–0) (49)	Stanford (28-1) (63)	Stanford (34-1) (64)	1.
2.	Nebraska (20)	Texas (2–0) (7)	Wisconsin (4–0) (6)	Stanford (6–1) (10)	Stanford (8–1) (6)	Stanford (10–1) (5)	Stanford (12–1) (4)	Stanford (14–1) (4)	Stanford (16–1) (4)	Stanford (18–1) (6)	Stanford (20–1) (12)	Stanford (22–1) (12)	Stanford (24–1) (16)	Stanford (26–1) (15)	Minnesota (25-3)	Nebraska (29-7)	2.
3.	Texas	Minnesota (2–0)	BYU (5–0) (7)	Texas (5–1)	Nebraska (9–1)	Nebraska (11–1)	Nebraska (13–1)	Minnesota (12–2)	Minnesota (14–2)	Minnesota (16–2)	Minnesota (18–2)	Minnesota (20–2)	Minnesota (22–2)	Minnesota (24–2)	Illinois (28-3)	Illinois (32-4)	3.
4.	Minnesota	Florida (1–1)	Stanford (4–1) (8)	Nebraska (6–1)	Penn State (9–1)	Texas (6–3)	Texas (8–3)	Texas (10–3)	Penn State (15–3)	Penn State (17–3)	Illinois (20–3)	Illinois (22–3)	Illinois (24–3)	Illinois (26–3)	BYU (27-1) (1)	BYU (31-2)	4.
5.	Kentucky	Nebraska (1–1)	Penn State (5–0) (4)	Penn State (6–1)	Texas (5–3)	Wisconsin (9–1)	Minnesota (10–2)	Nebraska (14–2)	Nebraska (15–3)	Pittsburgh (22–0)	Wisconsin (16–4)	Texas (15–4)	Texas (17–4)	Texas (18–4)	Texas (20-4)	Texas (23-5)	5.
6.	Penn State	Penn State (3–0)	Texas (3–1)	Wisconsin (5–1)	Wisconsin (7–1)	Minnesota (8–2)	Wisconsin (10–2)	Pittsburgh (17–0)	Pittsburgh (20–0)	Illinois (18–3)	Texas (14–4)	Nebraska (18–6)	Nebraska (20–6)	Nebraska (22–6)	Nebraska (24-6)	Penn State (26-8)	6.
7.	Florida (1)	USC (3–0)	Nebraska (4–1) (3)	Minnesota (5–2)	Minnesota (6–2)	Illinois (13–0)	Illinois (14–1)	Illinois (15–2)	Illinois (16–3)	Wisconsin (14–4)	Penn State (18–4)	Penn State (19–5)	Penn State (20–6) т	Penn State (22–6)	Penn State (23-7)	Minnesota (27-4)	7.
8.	BYU	Wisconsin (2–0)	Florida (3–2)	Illinois (8–0)	Illinois (11–0)	Pittsburgh (13–0)	Pittsburgh (15–0)	Wisconsin (11–3)	Texas (11–4)	Texas (12–4)	Nebraska (16–6)	Wisconsin (16–6)	Wisconsin (18–6) т	Wisconsin (20–6)	Wisconsin (22-6)	Wisconsin (25-7)	8.
9.	Wisconsin	BYU (2–0)	UCLA (4–0)	Pittsburgh (9–0)	Pittsburgh (11–0)	Penn State (9–3)	Penn State (11–3)	Penn State (13–3)	Wisconsin (12–4)	Nebraska (15–5)	Creighton (20–4)	Creighton (22–4)	Creighton (24–4)	Creighton (26–4)	Creighton (28-4)	Oregon (23-11)	9.
10.	USC	UCLA (2–0)	USC (5–1) (1)	Creighton (6–3)	Creighton (8–4)	Creighton (10–4)	Creighton (12–4)	Creighton (14–4)	Creighton (16–4)	Creighton (18–4)	Pittsburgh (23–1)	Pittsburgh (25–1)	Pittsburgh (26–1)	Pittsburgh (28–1)	Kentucky (24-4)	Kentucky (26-5)	10.
11.	UCLA	Illinois (3–0)	Illinois (5–0)	Florida (5–3)	Florida (9–3)	Florida (11–3)	Florida (13–3)	Florida (15–3)	Florida (17–3)	Cal Poly (19–1)	Florida (19–4)	Kentucky (18–4)	Kentucky (20–4)	Kentucky (22–4)	Pittsburgh (29-1)	Florida (26-7)	11.
12.	Illinois	Baylor (3–0)	Washington (3–1)	Oregon (5–3)	Oregon (7–3)	Oregon (9–3)	USC (11–4)	Cal Poly (16–1)	Cal Poly (17–1)	Michigan (18–3)	Kentucky (16–4)	Purdue (21–4)	Purdue (21–6)	Purdue (22–7)	Purdue (23-8)	Michigan (24-10)	12.
13.	Creighton	Washington (2–0)	Pittsburgh (6–0)	Washington (5–2)	Washington (8–2)	USC (10–3) т	Cal Poly (15–1)	Michigan (15–2)	Michigan (17–2)	Florida (18–4)	Purdue (19–4)	USC (18–7)	Florida (21–5)	Florida (23–5)	Cal Poly (25-2)	Creighton (29-5)	13.
14.	San Diego	Pittsburgh (3–0)	Creighton (4–2)	Cal Poly (7–1)	USC (8–3)	Washington (10–2) т	Purdue (13–2)	Oregon (11–5)	USC (14–5)	Kentucky (14–4)	Michigan (18–5)	Florida (20–5)	USC (21–5)	Cal Poly (25–2)	Oregon (20-10)	Pittsburgh (30-2)	14.
15.	Colorado	Creighton (1–2)	Baylor (4–2)	Purdue (8–0)	Cal Poly (10–1)	Cal Poly (13–1)	Washington (11–3)	USC (12–5)	Kentucky (12–4)	USC (15–6)	USC (16–7)	Michigan (19–6)	Cal Poly (23–2)	USC (20–9)	Marquette (26-6)	Marquette (28-7)	15.
16.	Baylor	Kentucky (0–3)	Kentucky (3–3) т	USC (6–3) т	Purdue (11–0)	Purdue (12–1)	Michigan (13–2)	Kentucky (10–4)	Oregon (12–6)	Oregon (13–7)	Oregon (15–7)	Cal Poly (21–2)	Oregon (17–9)	Marquette (25–5)	Florida (24-6)	Washington State (23-10)	16.
17.	Washington	Northern Iowa (2–1)	San Diego (1–3) т	UCLA (4–2) т	UCLA (5–2)	Michigan (12–1)	UCLA (7–4)	Purdue (14–3)	Purdue (15–4)	Purdue (17–4)	Cal Poly (19–2)	Oregon (16–8)	Marquette (24–5)	Oregon (18–10)	USC (21-10)	Purdue (24-9)	17.
18.	Oregon	Oregon (0–2)	Oregon (4–2)	Baylor (6–3)	Michigan (11–0)	UCLA (6–3)	Kentucky (9–4)	Washington (12–4)	Marquette (17–4)	Marquette (19–4)	Washington State (17–5)	Marquette (22–5)	Washington State (19–7)	Michigan (20–9)	Michigan (22-9)	Washington (20-13)	18.
19.	Utah	San Diego (0–2)	Purdue (5–0)	Michigan (9–0)	Baylor (8–3)	Kentucky (7–4)	Marquette (12–4)	Marquette (14–4)	Washington (13–5)	Washington State (15–5)	Marquette (20–5)	Washington State (18–6)	Michigan (19–8)	Washington (18–10)	Tennessee (25-5) т	Tennessee (26-6)	19.
20.	Pittsburgh	Purdue (3–0)	Michigan (5–0)	Kentucky (4–4)	Kentucky (6–4)	Marquette (10–4)	Oregon (9–5)	UCLA (8–5)	UCLA (10–5)	UCLA (11–6)	Missouri (20–4)	Arizona (18–8)	Washington (17–9)	Washington State (19–9)	Washington State (21-9) т	San Diego (18-13)	20.
21.	Iowa State	Colorado (2–1)	Utah (5–1)	Marquette (7–2)	Marquette (9–3)	Baylor (9–4)	Arizona (14–2)	Washington State (13–3)	Louisville (15–4)	Washington (13–7)	Arizona (17–7)	UCLA (12–9)	UCF (24–3)	UCF (26–3)	UCF (27-3)	USC (22-11)	21.
22.	Michigan State	Utah (2–1)	Cal Poly (5–1)	Washington State (7–0)	Washington State (9–1)	Washington State (9–3)	Washington State (11–3)	Louisville (13–4)	Kansas (13–4)	Louisville (16–5)	UCLA (11–8)	UCF (22–3)	Tennessee (21–5)	Tennessee (23–5)	Washington (18-12)	Cal Poly (25-3)	22.
23.	Purdue	Michigan (2–0)	Washington State (4–0)	San Diego (2–4)	Utah (8–3)	Colorado (9–4)	Baylor (10–5)	Arizona (14–4)	Washington State (13–5)	Arizona (16–6)	UCF (20–3)	Tennessee (20–5)	Missouri (22–5)	Arizona (20–10)	Arizona (22-10)	Missouri (24-8)	23.
24.	Cal Poly	Cal Poly (2–1)	Colorado (3–2)	Utah (7–2)	San Diego (3–6)	Arizona (12–2)	Utah (9–6)	Baylor (10–6)	Baylor (12–6)	Missouri (18–4)	Louisville (17–6)	Missouri (20–5)	Arizona (19–9)	Missouri (22–7)	Missouri (23-7)	Baylor (20-9)	24.
25.	Colorado State	Colorado State (1–1)	Marquette (5–1)	Alabama (9–0)	Alabama (12–1)	Utah (8–5)	Louisville (11–4)	Arizona State (13–5)	Arizona (14–6)	UCF (18–3)	Northern Iowa (18–7) т	Washington (15–9)	UCLA (12–11)	Baylor (18–8)	Baylor (19-8)	Arizona (22-11) т	25.
	Preseason Aug 8	Week 1 Aug 27	Week 2 Sep 3	Week 3 Sep 10	Week 4 Sep 17	Week 5 Sep 24	Week 6 Oct 1	Week 7 Oct 8	Week 8 Oct 15	Week 9 Oct 22	Week 10 Oct 29	Week 11 Nov 5	Week 12 Nov 12	Week 13 Nov 19	Week 14 Nov 26	Week 15 (Final) Dec 17	
		Dropped: Iowa State; Michigan State	Dropped: Colorado State; Northern Iowa	Dropped: Colorado	None	Dropped: Alabama; San Diego	Dropped: Colorado	Dropped: Utah	Dropped: Arizona State	Dropped: Baylor; Kansas	Dropped: Washington	Dropped: Louisville; Northern Iowa	None	Dropped: UCLA	None	None	
