= Student media (disambiguation) =

Student media most often refers to a student publication. It may also refer to:

- FIU Student Media, University Park, Florida, U.S.
- Marquette University Student Media, Milwaukee, Wisconsin, U.S.
  - Student Media Interactive, the university's student-run World Wide Web development agency
- Rabelais Student Media, a student newspaper at La Trobe University, Melbourne, Australia
- Student Media (Kent State), Kent, Ohio, U.S.
- Student Media Awards, an annual All-Ireland student journalism competition
- Texas Student Media, an auxiliary enterprise of the University of Texas, Austin, Texas, U.S.
