= MUTV =

MUTV may refer to:

- Marquette University Television, an American student channel featuring student programming
- MUTV (Manchester United F.C.), a British subscription based television channel, operated by Manchester United F.C.
- tvMu an Indonesian islamic television network operated by Muhammadiyah
