= Kevin Hambly =

American volleyball coach (born 1973)

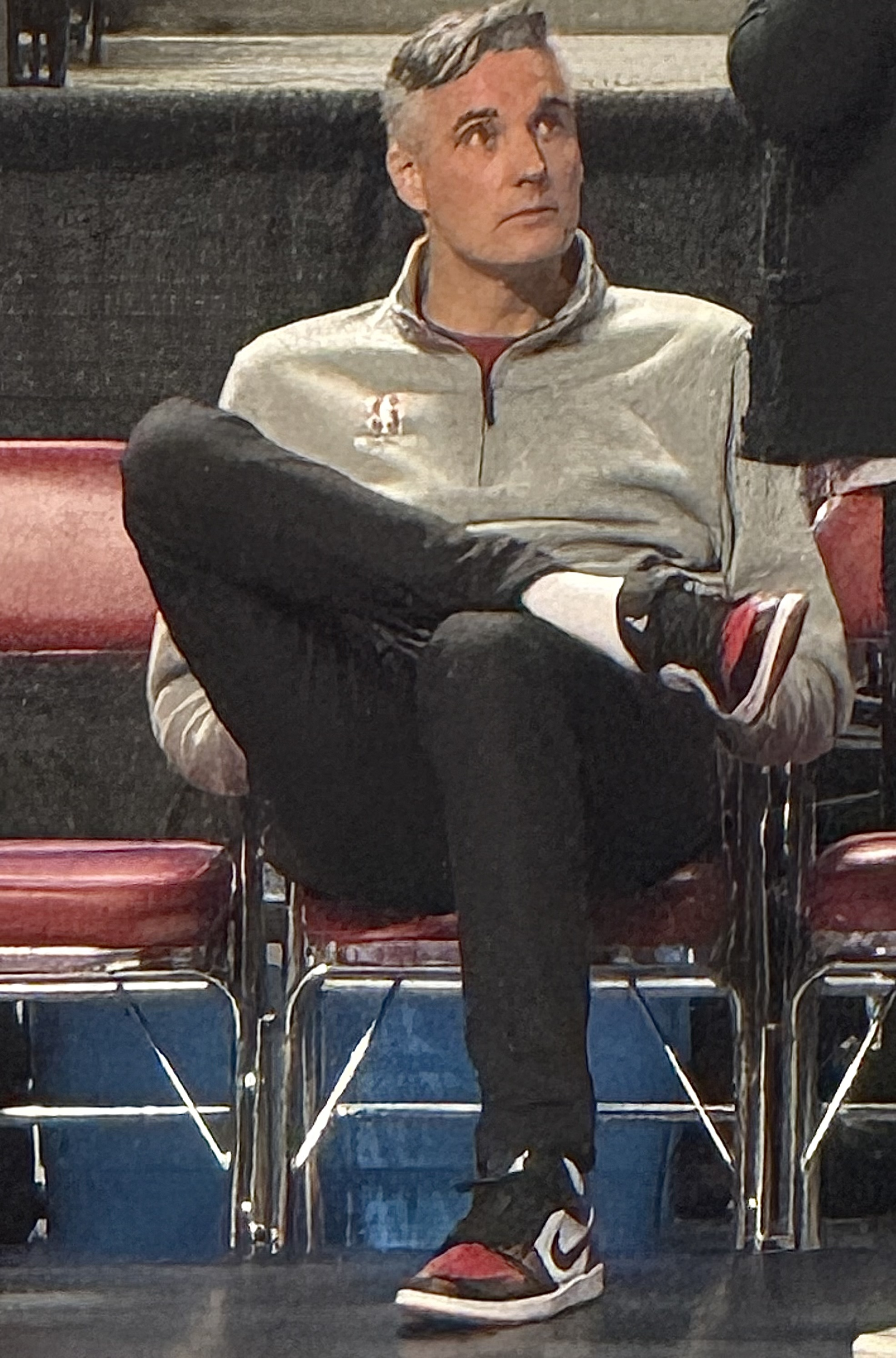
- Hambly in 2024

Current position
- Title: Head coach
- Team: Stanford
- Conference: Atlantic Coast Conference
- Record: 145–56 (.721)

Biographical details
- Born: March 12, 1973 (age 53); Granada Hills, California, U.S.

Playing career
- 1992–1995: Brigham Young University
- 1995–1996: Montpellier Université Club
- Position: Middle Blocker

Coaching career (HC unless noted)
- 1996–2001: UNLV (Asst.)
- 2001–2004: USA Olympic Team (Asst.)
- 2002: Minnesota Chill (Asst.)
- 2004–2008: Illinois (Asst.)
- 2009–2016: Illinois
- 2017–present: Stanford

Head coaching record
- Overall: 406–133 (.753)

Accomplishments and honors

Championships
- 2x National Champions (2018, 2019) 5x Pac-12 Regular Champions (2017–19, 2022–23) 1x ACC Champions (2025)

Awards
- 2x AVCA Pacific Region Coach of the Year (2022, 2025) Volleyball Magazine National Coach of the Year (2011); 2x Pac-12 Coach of the Year (2018, 2022) ACC Coach of the Year (2025)

Kevin William Hambly (born March 12, 1973) is an American volleyball coach. He previously coached at the University of Illinois at Urbana–Champaign (2009–2017). Coaching his first team to a 26–6 record, he had reached at least the Sweet Sixteen or better in each of his team's appearances at the NCAA Tournament. On January 30, 2017, he accepted a job as head coach of the Stanford volleyball team, replacing John Dunning after he retired.

== Personal life ==
Hambly was born in Simi Valley, California, and received his Bachelor of Science degree in Recreation, Sport, and Tourism with an emphasis in sports management in 2006. He is married to Mary Coleman Hambly, who is both a former player (1995–1998) and former assistant coach (2004–2006) at Illinois. Kevin and Mary have two children, Joseph and Maura Hambly.

== Playing career ==
Hambly played high school volleyball at Royal High School in Simi Valley, California, where he was named an All-American his senior year. He also played basketball at Royal High School and was named all-league.

He continued his career at Brigham Young University from 1992 to 1995, where he started from 1993 to 1995. Hambly was named Third-Team All-American during his junior season and First-Team All-American during his senior season. Hambly holds the BYU school record for solo blocks in a game, which he set with five against Ball State his freshman year.

Following his time at BYU, Hambly played professional volleyball with Montpellier Université Club in Montpellier, France, during the 1995–96 season.

== Coaching career ==
Hambly started coaching at the Highline Volleyball Club in Northridge, California, where he served as the head coach of the 16 and under teams from 1995 to 1997.

Following his time with the Highline Volleyball Club, Hambly joined the UNLV coaching staff as an assistant coach. During his time at UNLV, he also founded the Rebel volleyball club in Las Vegas as well as the men's club volleyball team at UNLV.

In 2001, Hambly left UNLV to become the assistant USA national volleyball team, where he also served as the head coach of the USA Women's National Training Team.

=== Illinois ===
In 2004, Hambly came to the University of Illinois as an assistant coach under Don Hardin. After five years as an assistant coach, Hambly was named the head coach in January 2009. As both an assistant and head coach, Hambly has proven himself to be one of the premier recruiters in college volleyball, securing the sixth-ranked recruiting class in 2007 and the seventh-ranked class in 2010. His first season as head coach saw Illinois place second in the Big Ten Conference and reach the third round of the NCAA Division I Volleyball Tournament.

In his second year as head coach of the Fighting Illini, he guided the team to the sweet sixteen yet again, despite some major injuries suffered by key players during the season. Following the season, Hambly continued his tradition of successful recruiting by securing the third-ranked recruiting class in the nation.

In the 2011 season, his third year as head coach, Hambly's Fighting Illini swept the season series with four-time defending national champions Penn State. Both Volleyball Magazine (VBM) and AVCA polls ranked his team at #1 for four weeks. Later, during the semifinals of the NCAA Tournament, he coached his squad to victory in one of the most memorable matches in school history with an upset over #1 ranked USC. After guiding his Illinois team to an NCAA Tournament runners-up spot with two outstanding players, Michelle Bartsch, a VBM first-team All-American and Colleen Ward a VBM second-team All-American, Hambly was named VBM 2011 National Coach of the Year.

=== Stanford ===
Hambly accepted the position of head coach of volleyball for Stanford on January 30, 2017, leaving his previous position as head coach at the University of Illinois. In 2018 Hambly led Stanford to its eighth, and his first, NCAA national championship.

=== Head coaching record ===
Record table
Season	Team	Overall	Conference	Standing	Postseason
Illinois Fighting Illini (Big Ten Conference) (2009–2016)
2009	Illinois	26–6	16–4	2nd	NCAA Sweet Sixteen
2010	Illinois	24–9	14–6	2nd	NCAA Sweet Sixteen
2011	Illinois	32–5	16–4	2nd	NCAA Runner-up
2012	Illinois	14–16	8–12	8th	
2013	Illinois	18–15	12–8	4th	NCAA Sweet Sixteen
2014	Illinois	26–8	16–4	3rd	NCAA Sweet Sixteen
2015	Illinois	21–13	10–10	7th	NCAA Sweet Sixteen
2016	Illinois	17–14	10–10	8th	
Illinois:		178–86 (.674)	102–58 (.638)		
Stanford Cardinal (Pac-12 Conference) (2017–2023)
2017	Stanford	30–4	19–1	1st	NCAA Final Four
2018	Stanford	34–1	20–0	1st	NCAA Champions
2019	Stanford	30–4	18–2	1st	NCAA Champions
2020	Stanford	2–8	2–8	11th	
2021	Stanford	19–11	13–7	T–4th	NCAA Second Round
2022	Stanford	27–5	19–1	1st	NCAA Elite Eight
2023	Stanford	29–4	19–1	1st	NCAA Elite Eight
Stanford Cardinal (Atlantic Coast Conference) (2024–Present)
2024	Stanford	28–5	17–3	T–2nd	NCAA Elite Eight
2025	Stanford	29–5	18–2	T–1st	NCAA Sweet Sixteen
2026	Stanford	17–9	10–6		TBD
Stanford:		145–56 (.721)	155–31 (.833)		
Total:		423–142 (.749)			
National champion Postseason invitational champion Conference regular season champion Conference regular season and conference tournament champion Division regular season champion Division regular season and conference tournament champion Conference tournament champion
