= 2018 BYU Cougars women's volleyball team =

American college volleyball season

2018 BYU Cougars women's volleyball

WCC regular season Champ

NCAA, National semifinals
- Conference: West Coast Conference
- Record: 31–2 (17–1 WCC)
- Head coach: Heather Olmstead (4th season)
- Assistant coaches: David Hyte (5th season); Jonny Neeley (3rd season)
- Home arena: Smith Fieldhouse

2018 West Coast Conference volleyball standings
	Conf.				Overall
Team	W		L	PCT	W		L	PCT
No. 4 BYU ‍†‍‍^{y}	17	–	1	.944	31	–	2	.939
Pepperdine ‍‍‍^{y}	14	–	4	.778	22	–	9	.710
San Diego ‍‍‍^{y}	13	–	5	.722	18	–	13	.581
Saint Mary's ‍‍‍^{y}	11	–	7	.611	19	–	10	.655
Loyola Marymount ‍‍‍^{y}	10	–	8	.556	21	–	10	.677
Pacific ‍‍‍	8	–	10	.444	13	–	16	.448
Gonzaga ‍‍‍	8	–	10	.444	11	–	18	.379
Portland* ‍‍‍	6	–	12	.333	20	–	13	.606
San Francisco ‍‍‍	2	–	16	.111	9	–	20	.310
Santa Clara ‍‍‍	1	–	17	.056	6	–	24	.200
† – Conference champion y – Invited to the NCAA Tournament *invited to the 2018 Women's NVIC; As of 2018-12-13; Rankings from AVCA; Source:West Coast Conference

The 2018 BYU Cougars women's volleyball team represented Brigham Young University in the 2018 NCAA Division I women's volleyball season. The Cougars were led by fourth year head coach Heather Olmstead and played their home games at the Smith Fieldhouse. The Cougars were members of the WCC.

BYU came off a season where they won the WCC regular season championship and once again participated in the NCAA tournament before falling to Kentucky in the third round.

== Season highlights ==
- Roni Jones-Perry won the WCC Player of the Week (Sept. 3) and the AVCA Player of the Week (Sept. 4) awards for her performance during BYU's win over Stanford at the BYU Nike Invitational. Additionally she was the tournament MVP.
- The 5,472 attendance against Utah was a record for the highest attendance ever for women's volleyball in the Smith Fieldhouse.
- Mary Lake was awarded the #2 play on the SportsCenter Top 10 for the night for her save against Utah.
- The 1,137 attendance at Weber State was a record for the highest attendance in Swenson Gym since it was remodeled and made specifically into a volleyball court in 2006.
- Lyndie Haddock-Eppich won the WCC player of the week award on Sept. 17 for her performances against Utah and Weber State.
- The 2,259 attendance at Portland was a record for the highest volleyball attendance at Chiles Center.
- The November 17 game at Pacific was relocated from Stockton due to the California Wildfires causing bad air quality.
- Heather Olmstead was voted as the 2018 AVCA Coach of the Year.

== Roster ==
2018 BYU Cougars Roster
Defensive Specialist/Libero: 9 Sydnie Martindale - Senior; 18 Mary Lake - Junior; Opposite hitters: 5 Emily Lewis-Bushman - (redshirt) Junior; 22 Sara Hamson - Sophomore	Outside hitters: 1 Taylen Ballard - Sophomore; 3 Madi Robinson - Freshman; 11 Lacy Haddock - Senior; 12 Roni Jones-Perry - Senior; 13 Danelle Stetler - (redshirt) Senior; 14 McKenna Miller - Junior; 20 Riley Lyman - Junior	Setters: 6 Lyndie Haddock-Eppich - Senior; 8 Tayler Tausinga - Freshman; 15 Kiani Moea'i - (redshirt) Junior; Middle blockers: 2 Heather Gneiting- Freshman; 5 Emily Lewis-Bushman - (redshirt) Junior; 16 Allison Stapleton - (redshirt) Sophomore; 21 Whitney McEwan - Freshman; 24 Kennedy Eschenberg - (redshirt) Sophomore

== Schedule ==
Date Time	Opponent	Rank	Arena City (Tournament)	Television	Result	Attendance	Record (WCC Record)
8/18; 1 p.m.	Utah Valley	#8	Smith Fieldhouse; Provo, UT (UCCU Crosstown Clash)	BYUtv	W 3–0 (27–25, 25–22, 25–20)	N/A	Exhibition
8/24; 5:30 p.m.	@ Duke	#8	Cameron Indoor Stadium; Durham, NC	ACC Extra	W 3–0 (25–22, 25–19, 25–16)	2,159	1–0
8/25; 4:30 p.m.	@ Duke	#8	Cameron Indoor Stadium; Durham, NC	ACC Extra	W 3–1 (16–25, 25–19, 25–22, 25–17)	1,773	2–0
8/30; 7 p.m.	West Virginia	#9	Smith Fieldhouse; Provo, UT (BYU Nike Invitational)	TheW.tv	W 3–0 (25–18, 25–11, 25–14)	1,201	3–0
8/31; 7 p.m.	#1 Stanford	#9	Smith Fieldhouse; Provo, UT (BYU Nike Invitational)	BYUtv	W 3–2 (25–22, 25–20, 21–25, 20–25, 15–11)	3,389	4–0
9/01; 7 p.m.	Wichita State	#9	Smith Fieldhouse; Provo, UT (BYU Nike Invitational)	TheW.tv	W 3–0 (25–16, 25–12, 25–20)	2,231	5–0
9/07; 9 a.m.	vs. #10 USC	#3	Al McGuire Center; Milwaukee, WI (Marquette Tournament)	Facebook	W 3–0 (30–28, 25–21, 25–14)	175	6–0
9/07; 4 p.m.	vs. Syracuse	#3	Al McGuire Center; Milwaukee, WI (Marquette Tournament)	Facebook	W 3–0 (25–23, 25–20, 25–20)	768	7–0
9/08; 5 p.m.	@ #25 Marquette	#3	Al McGuire Center; Milwaukee, WI (Marquette Tournament)	MUTV	W 3–1 (23–25, 25–22, 25–20, 25–14)	1,481	8–0
9/13; 7 p.m.	#24 Utah	#1	Smith Fieldhouse; Provo, UT (Deseret First Duel)	BYUtv	W 3–0 (25–20, 25–14, 25–17)	5,472	9–0
9/15; 2 p.m.	@ Weber State	#1	Swenson Gym; Ogden, UT	Pluto TV 235	W 3–0 (25–18, 25–18, 25–16)	1,137	10–0
9/20; 7:05 p.m.	Pacific*	#1	Smith Fieldhouse; Provo, UT	BYUtv	W 3–0 (25–12, 25–20, 25–14)	2,210	11–0 (1–0)
9/22; 1:05 p.m.	Saint Mary's*	#1	Smith Fieldhouse; Provo, UT	TheW.tv	W 3–0 (25–10, 25–14, 25–13)	2,270	12–0 (2–0)
9/25; 7 p.m.	@ Pepperdine*	#1	Firestone Fieldhouse; Malibu, CA	ESPNU	W 3–0 (25–15, 25–18, 25–21)	1,211	13–0 (3–0)
9/27; 7:05 p.m.	Gonzaga*	#1	Smith Fieldhouse; Provo, UT	TheW.tv	W 3–0 (25–12, 25–10, 25–15)	1,741	14–0 (4–0)
9/29; 1 p.m.	Portland*	#1	Smith Fieldhouse; Provo, UT	BYUtv	W 3–0 (25–14, 25–15, 25–18)	2,109	15–0 (5–0)
10/05; 8 p.m.	@ San Diego*	#1	Jenny Craig Pavilion; San Diego, CA	TheW.tv	W 3–1 (25–21, 24–26, 25–16, 25–10)	1,382	16–0 (6–0)
10/11; 8 p.m.	@ San Francisco*	#1	War Memorial Gymnasium; San Francisco, CA	TheW.tv	W 3–0 (25–13, 25–20, 25–21)	313	17–0 (7–0)
10/13; 2 p.m.	@ Santa Clara*	#1	Leavey Center; Santa Clara, CA	TheW.tv	W 3–0 (25–19, 25–22, 25–13)	447	18–0 (8–0)
10/18; 7 p.m.	Loyola Marymount	#1	Smith Fieldhouse; Provo, UT	BYUtv	W 3–0 (25–23, 25–15, 25–20)	2,884	19–0 (9–0)
10/20; 1 p.m.	Pepperdine*	#1	Smith Fieldhouse; Provo, UT	BYUtv	W 3–0 (26–24, 25–13, 25–8)	3,443	20–0 (10–0)
10/25; 8 p.m.	@ Portland*	#1	Chiles Center; Portland, OR	TheW.tv	W 3–0 (25–21, 25–16, 25–20)	2,259	21–0 (11–0)
10/27; 1 p.m.	@ Gonzaga*	#1	McCarthey Athletic Center; Spokane, WA	TheW.tv	W 3–0 (25–19, 25–20, 25–23)	1,362	22–0 (12–0)
11/02; 7 p.m.	San Diego*	#1	Smith Fieldhouse; Provo, UT	BYUtv	W 3–1 (25–19, 25–15, 22–25, 25–20)	5,082	23–0 (13–0)
11/08; 7 p.m.	Santa Clara*	#1	Smith Fieldhouse; Provo, UT	BYUtv	W 3–0 (28–26, 25–17, 25–11)	2,762	24–0 (14–0)
11/10; 1 p.m.	San Francisco*	#1	Smith Fieldhouse; Provo, UT	TheW.tv	W 3–0 (25–12, 25–12, 25–9)	4,213	25–0 (15–0)
11/15; 8 p.m.	@ Saint Mary's*	#1	McKeon Pavilion; Moraga, CA	TheW.tv	W 3–1 (25–23, 25–23, 24–26, 25–16)	1,055	26–0 (16–0)
11/17; 1 p.m.	@ Pacific*	#1	Cabrillo College Gymnasium; Aptos, CA		W 3–0 (25–17, 25–19, 25–17)	233	27–0 (17–0)
11/20; 8 p.m.	@ Loyola Marymount*	#1	Gersten Pavilion; Los Angeles, CA	TheW.tv	L 0–3 (23–25, 25–27, 20–25)	820	27–1 (17–1)
11/30; 7 p.m.	y- Stony Brook	#4 (4-seed)	Smith Fieldhouse; Provo, UT (NCAA Tournament 1st Round)	BYUtv	W 3–0 (25–20, 25–13, 25–12)	3,675	28–1 (17–1)
12/01; 7 p.m.	y- Utah	#4 (4-seed)	Smith Fieldhouse; Provo, UT (NCAA Tournament 2nd Round)	BYUtv	W 3–0 (25–16, 25–21, 25–18)	5,183	29–1 (17–1)
12/07; 4:30 p.m.	y- #16 Florida	#4 (4-seed)	Smith Fieldhouse; Provo, UT (NCAA Tournament Regional semifinal)	ESPN3	W 3–1 (23–25, 25–13, 25–17, 25–19)	5,104	30–1 (17–1)
12/08; 6 p.m.	y- #5/(5–seed) Texas	#4 (4-seed)	Smith Fieldhouse; Provo, UT (NCAA Tournament Regional final)	ESPNU	W 3–0 (25–23, 25–23, 25–21)	5,326	31–1 (17–1)
12/13; 5 p.m.	y- #1/(1–seed) Stanford	#4 (4-seed)	Target Center; Minneapolis, MN (NCAA Tournament Semifinal)	ESPN	L 0–3 (15–25, 15–25, 18–25)	17,808	31–2 (17–1)

*-Indicates Conference Opponent
y-Indicates NCAA Playoffs
Times listed are Mountain Time Zone.

== Announcers for televised games ==
All home games will be on BYUtv or TheW.tv powered by Stadium. All but one road game will also be televised or streamed. The Pacific game was originally scheduled to be streamed on TheW.tv, but a change in venues due to the bad air quality from the California Wildfires cancelled the stream.

- Utah Valley: Spencer Linton, Jarom Jordan, & Jason Shepherd
- Duke: Ryan Craig & Emma Paradiso
- Duke: Ryan Craig & Emma Paradiso
- West Virginia: Mitchell Marshall
- Stanford: Spencer Linton, Amy Gant, & Jason Shepherd
- Wichita State: Mitchell Marshall
- USC: No commentary
- Syracuse: No commentary
- Marquette: Dan Avington and Zoe Comerford
- Utah: Spencer Linton, Amy Gant, & Jason Shepherd
- Weber State: Brandon Garside
- Pacific: Spencer Linton, Kristen Kozlowski, & Jason Shepherd
- Saint Mary's: Mitchell Marshall
- Pepperdine: Paul Sunderland & Holly McPeak
- Gonzaga: Mitchell Marshall
- Portland: Spencer Linton, Kristen Kozlowski, & Jason Shepherd
- San Diego: Nick Rice
- San Francisco: Joe Hallisy
- Santa Clara: Anthony Passarelli
- Loyola Marymount: Spencer Linton, Kristen Kozlowski, & Jason Shepherd
- Pepperdine: Spencer Linton, Kristen Kozlowski, & Jason Shepherd
- Portland: Tom Kolker & Laura Humphrey
- Gonzaga: No commentary
- San Diego: Spencer Linton & Kristen Kozlowski
- Santa Clara: Spencer Linton & Kristen Kozlowski
- San Francisco: Robbie Bullough
- Saint Mary's: Alex Jensen & Andy Schroeder
- Loyola Marymount: Max O'Neill
- Stony Brook: Spencer Linton, Kristen Kozlowski, & Jason Shepherd
- Utah: Spencer Linton & Kristen Kozlowski
- Florida: Sam Gore & Dain Blanton
- Texas: Sam Gore & Dain Blanton
- Semifinal: Paul Sunderland, Karch Kiraly, & Holly Rowe
