= Johnston Hall (Milwaukee, Wisconsin) =

- Robert A. Johnston Hall
- U.S. National Register of Historic Places
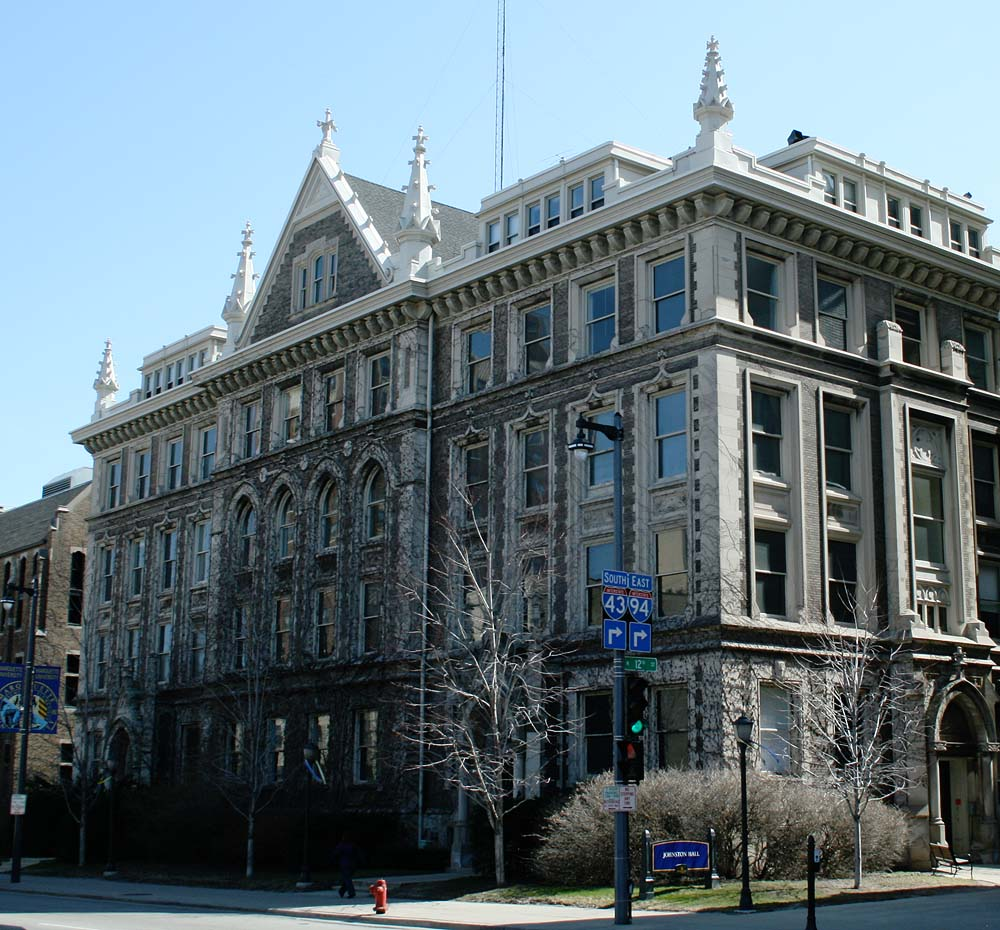
- Johnston Hall
- Location: 1121 W. Wisconsin Ave. Milwaukee, Wisconsin
- Coordinates: 43.03838°N 87.92677°W
- Architect: Charles D. Crane
- NRHP reference No.: 86000118
- Added to NRHP: January 16, 1986

Robert A. Johnston Hall (or simply Johnston Hall) is a Gothic-ornamented building in downtown Milwaukee, Wisconsin. The hall houses the J. William & Mary Diederich College of Communication at Marquette University. It was designed by Milwaukee architect Charles D. Crane, completed in 1907 and added to the National Register of Historic Places in 1986.

== History ==
Marquette College was established in 1881, with one four-story building on 10th and State streets accommodating 450 students. Enrollment grew until the building was crowded. In 1906, baking magnate Robert A. Johnston donated $100,000 to help Marquette build a new building near Gesu Church on Wisconsin Avenue. When more money was needed for the building, Johnston made up the difference, and the school named the building for him. The college students moved to the new building and Marquette's prep high school students stayed behind at the old building on State Street.

The new building opened to the Jesuit community at Marquette in 1907, only a few weeks prior to Robert Johnston's death. Johnston Hall once housed all departments of the university with the exception of the medical department. The College of Journalism moved into Johnston Hall in 1975 and later merged with Marquette's Colleges of Speech, Performing Arts and Communication to form what is now the J. William & Mary Diederich College of Communication. Marquette University Student Media is housed in the hall.

On May 15, 2018 a Milwaukee County Transit System bus crashed into the west entrance of the north side of the building, nobody inside the building was hurt but the driver and passengers were rushed to the hospital with non-life-threatening injuries.

== See also ==
- Marquette University
