= Student Media Interactive =

Student Media Interactive (SMI) is Marquette University's student-run World Wide Web development agency. SMI is responsible for the presence of all outlets of Marquette University Student Media on the web.

== History ==
Student Media Interactive began existing in its present form in 2003, when the Diederich College of Communication had a problem: content from all of its Student Media outlets had been produced but had no way of being displayed within the college's main building, Robert A. Johnston Hall. Freshman Paul Hinze and sophomore Michael Schultz were asked to create such a system, using two 30-inch Apple Cinema displays, a Power Mac G5 and Adobe Flash. The project, dubbed WindowBox, was completed roughly a year later. It consisted of XML files of media data being fed to Flash, and jointly displayed on the twin screens. Schultz and Hinze remained employed by the college to work on other technological projects.

== Staff ==
SMI is typically staffed by five people: one director, two programmers, and two designers.

=== Directors ===
The following table lists former and current directors of Student Media Interactive.

Academic years	Director
2006-2007	Michael Shultz (Co-Director); Paul Hinze (Co-Director)
2007-2008	Paul Hinze
2008-2009	John Luetke
