= 2018 NCAA Division I women's volleyball tournament =

Volleyball competition

2018 NCAA women's Division I volleyball tournament
- 2018 Division I Championship
- Finals site: Target Center; Minneapolis, Minnesota
- Champions: Stanford (8th title)
- Runner-up: Nebraska (9th title match)
- Semifinalists: BYU (3rd Final Four); Illinois (4th Final Four)
- Winning coach: Kevin Hambly (1st title)
- Most outstanding player: Kathryn Plummer (Stanford); Morgan Hentz (Stanford)
- Final Four All-Tournament Team: Jenna Gray (Stanford); Audriana Fitzmorris (Stanford); Mikaela Foecke (Nebraska); Lauren Stivrins (Nebraska); Jacqueline Quade (Illinois)

The 2018 NCAA Division I women's volleyball tournament began on November 29, 2018, and concluded on December 15 at the Target Center in Minneapolis, Minnesota. The tournament field was announced on November 25, 2018. Stanford beat Nebraska in the final to claim their eighth national championship.

== Qualifying Teams ==
Stanford Regional
Seed	RPI	School	Conference	Berth Type	Record
1	1	Stanford	Pac-12	Automatic	28–1
8	12	Penn State	Big Ten	At–Large	23–7
9	13	Creighton	Big East	Automatic	28–4
16	14	Washington State	Pac-12	At-Large	21–9
	236	Alabama State	SWAC	Automatic	23–17
	57	Loyola Marymount	WCC	At–Large	20–9
	44	Duke	ACC	At–Large	16–11
	26	Tennessee	SEC	At–Large	25–5
	38	Colorado State	MWC	Automatic	23–7
	102	Northern Arizona	Big Sky	Automatic	26–8
	110	South Dakota	Summit	Automatic	21–9
	43	Saint Mary's	WCC	At-Large	19–9
	25	Washington	Pac-12	At–Large	18–12
	36	Syracuse	ACC	At–Large	18–8
	41	Yale	Ivy League	Automatic	19–4
	169	Howard	MEAC	Automatic	20–10

Champaign Regional
Seed	RPI	School	Conference	Berth Type	Record
3	2	Illinois	Big Ten	At–Large	28–3
6	6	Wisconsin	Big Ten	At–Large	22–6
11	9	USC	Pac-12	At-Large	21–10
14	15	Marquette	Big East	At-Large	26–6
	153	Eastern Michigan	MAC	Automatic	21–13
	37	Louisville	ACC	At–Large	21–8
	28	Dayton	Atlantic 10	Automatic	23–7
	24	Cincinnati	American	At–Large	25–7
	29	Illinois State	MVC	At–Large	25–7
	55	High Point	Big South	Automatic	21–9
	120	Samford	SoCon	Automatic	19–14
	53	San Diego	WCC	At-Large	16–12
	23	Cal Poly	Big West	Automatic	25–2
	16	Northern Iowa	MVC	Automatic	24–9
	35	Pepperdine	WCC	At-Large	21–8
	127	Green Bay	Horizon	Automatic	20–10

Minneapolis Regional
Seed	RPI	School	Conference	Berth Type	Record
2	4	Minnesota	Big Ten	Automatic	25–3
7	11	Nebraska	Big Ten	At-Large	24–6
10	8	Kentucky	SEC	Automatic	24–4
15	19	Oregon	Pac-12	At-Large	20–10
	58	Hofstra	CAA	Automatic	25–7
	39	Arizona	Pac-12	At–Large	22–10
	31	Missouri	SEC	At–Large	23–7
	20	Purdue	Big Ten	At–Large	23–8
	33	East Tennessee State	SoCon	At–Large	28–6
	100	Murray State	OVC	Automatic	22–9
	49	New Mexico State	WAC	Automatic	24–7
	46	Hawaii	Big West	At–Large	18–8
	17	Baylor	Big 12	At–Large	19–8
	32	South Carolina	SEC	At–Large	19–9
	50	Colorado	Pac-12	At–Large	18–13
	202	Bryant	NEC	Automatic	22–12

Provo Regional
Seed	RPI	School	Conference	Berth Type	Record
4	5	BYU	WCC	Automatic	27–1
5	3	Texas	Big 12	Automatic	20–4
12	7	Pitt	ACC	Automatic	29–1
13	10	UCF	American	Automatic	27–3
	42	Stephen F. Austin	Southland	Automatic	32–2
	30	Rice	C-USA	Automatic	24–6
	22	Texas State	Sun Belt	Automatic	26–6
	21	Michigan	Big Ten	At–Large	22–9
	90	Navy	Patriot	Automatic	23–8
	155	Iona	MAAC	Automatic	20–7
	47	Florida Gulf Coast	Atlantic Sun	Automatic	26–6
	27	Florida State	ACC	At–Large	19–9
	18	Florida	SEC	At–Large	24–6
	34	Utah	Pac-12	At–Large	18–13
	40	Denver	Summit	At–Large	27–2
	104	Stony Brook	America East	Automatic	21–8

== Bracket ==
=== Stanford Regional ===
First round
1	Stanford	3
Alabama State	0
Stanford, CA
Loyola Marymount	3
Duke	0
Tennessee	3
Colorado State	2
Pullman, WA
Northern Arizona	1
16	Washington State	3
9	Creighton	3
South Dakota	0
Omaha, NE
Saint Mary's	1
Washington	3
Syracuse	3
Yale	0
University Park, PA
Howard	0
8	Penn State	3

Second round
1	Stanford	3
Loyola Marymount	0
Tennessee	1
16	Washington St.	3
9	Creighton	0
Washington	3
Syracuse	0
8	Penn St.	3

Regional semifinals
1	Stanford	3
16	Washington St.	1
Washington	0
8	Penn St.	3

Regional finals
1	Stanford	3
8	Penn St.	1

=== Schedule ===
==== First round ====
November 30, 2018; 3:30 PM CST	Saint Mary's	1–3	Washington	D. J. Sokol Arena, Omaha, Nebraska; Attendance: 2,552
November 30, 2018; 3:30 PM CST	(22–25, 17–25, 26–24, 22–25)			D. J. Sokol Arena, Omaha, Nebraska; Attendance: 2,552

November 30, 2018; 4:00 PM PST	Colorado State	2–3	Tennessee	Bohler Gymnasium, Pullman, Washington; Attendance: 256
November 30, 2018; 4:00 PM PST	(28–26, 25–20, 18–25, 21–25, 12–15)			Bohler Gymnasium, Pullman, Washington; Attendance: 256

November 30, 2018; 4:30 PM PST	Loyola Marymount	3–0	Duke	Maples Pavilion, Stanford, California; Attendance: 788
November 30, 2018; 4:30 PM PST	(25–16, 25–22, 25–16)			Maples Pavilion, Stanford, California; Attendance: 788

November 30, 2018; 5:00 PM EST	Yale	0–3	Syracuse	Rec Hall, University Park, PA; Attendance: 2,247
November 30, 2018; 5:00 PM EST	(22–25, 21–25, 16–25)			Rec Hall, University Park, PA; Attendance: 2,247

November 30, 2018; 6:05 PM CST	South Dakota	0–3	Creighton	D. J. Sokol Arena, Omaha, Nebraska; Attendance: 2,552
November 30, 2018; 6:05 PM CST	(14–25, 14–25, 22–25)			D. J. Sokol Arena, Omaha, Nebraska; Attendance: 2,552

November 30, 2018; 7:00 PM PST	Alabama State	0–3	Stanford	Maples Pavilion, Stanford, California; Attendance: 2,061
November 30, 2018; 7:00 PM PST	(10–25, 17–25, 15–25)			Maples Pavilion, Stanford, California; Attendance: 2,061

November 30, 2018; 7:00 PM PST	Northern Arizona	1–3	Washington State	Bohler Gymnasium, Pullman, Washington; Attendance: 1,486
November 30, 2018; 7:00 PM PST	(23–25, 15–25, 25–22, 21–25)			Bohler Gymnasium, Pullman, Washington; Attendance: 1,486

November 30, 2018; 7:30 PM EST	Howard	0–3	Penn State	Rec Hall, University Park, Pennsylvania; Attendance: 2,247
November 30, 2018; 7:30 PM EST	(9–25, 9–25, 8–25)			Rec Hall, University Park, Pennsylvania; Attendance: 2,247

==== Second round ====
December 1, 2018; 6:00 PM PST	Loyola Marymount	0–3	Stanford	Maples Pavilion, Stanford, California; Attendance: 2,104
December 1, 2018; 6:00 PM PST	(20–25, 15–25, 17–25)			Maples Pavilion, Stanford, California; Attendance: 2,104

December 1, 2018; 6:00 PM PST	Tennessee	1–3	Washington State	Bohler Gymnasium, Pullman, Washington; Attendance: 1,762
December 1, 2018; 6:00 PM PST	(28–30, 18–25, 25–19, 13–25)			Bohler Gymnasium, Pullman, Washington; Attendance: 1,762

December 1, 2018; 7:00 PM EST	Syracuse	0–3	Penn State	Rec Hall, University Park, Pennsylvania; Attendance: 2,274
December 1, 2018; 7:00 PM EST	(13–25, 20–25, 16–25)			Rec Hall, University Park, Pennsylvania; Attendance: 2,274

December 1, 2018; 7:05 PM CST	Washington	3–0	Creighton	D. J. Sokol Arena, Omaha, Nebraska; Attendance: 2,509
December 1, 2018; 7:05 PM CST	(25–19, 25–21, 25–23)			D. J. Sokol Arena, Omaha, Nebraska; Attendance: 2,509

==== Regional semifinals ====
December 7, 2018; 3:00 PM PST	Penn State	3–0	Washington	Maples Pavilion, Stanford, California; Attendance: 2,316
December 7, 2018; 3:00 PM PST	(26–24, 25–21, 25–21)			Maples Pavilion, Stanford, California; Attendance: 2,316

December 7, 2018; 5:33 PM PST	Washington State	1–3	Stanford	Maples Pavilion, Stanford, California; Attendance: 2,316
December 7, 2018; 5:33 PM PST	(17–25, 26–24, 14–25, 19–25)			Maples Pavilion, Stanford, California; Attendance: 2,316

==== Regional Final ====
December 8, 2018; 7:03 PM PST	Penn State	1–3	Stanford	Maples Pavilion, Stanford, California; Attendance: 3,256
December 8, 2018; 7:03 PM PST	(25–18, 23–25, 20–25, 16–25)			Maples Pavilion, Stanford, California; Attendance: 3,256

=== BYU Regional ===
First round
5	Texas	3
Stephen F. Austin	0
Austin, TX
Rice	1
Texas State	3
Michigan	3
Navy	0
Pittsburgh, PA
Iona	0
12	Pittsburgh	3
13	UCF	2
FGCU	3
Orlando, FL
Florida State	0
Florida	3
Utah	3
Denver	0
Provo, UT
Stony Brook	0
4	BYU	3

Second round
5	Texas	3
Texas State	0
Michigan	3
12	Pittsburgh	2
FGCU	0
Florida	3
Utah	0
4	BYU	3

Regional semifinals
5	Texas	3
Michigan	1
Florida	1
4	BYU	3

Regional finals
5	Texas	0
4	BYU	3

=== Schedule ===
==== First round ====
November 29, 2018; 4:00 PM CST	Rice	1–3	Texas State	Gregory Gymnasium, Austin, Texas; Attendance: N/A
November 29, 2018; 4:00 PM CST	(25–23, 22–25, 22–25, 25–27)			Gregory Gymnasium, Austin, Texas; Attendance: N/A

November 29, 2018; 4:30 PM EST	Florida State	0–3	Florida	The Venue at UCF, Orlando, Florida; Attendance: 1,207
November 29, 2018; 4:30 PM EST	(21–25, 20–25, 13–25)			The Venue at UCF, Orlando, Florida; Attendance: 1,207

November 29, 2018; 7:00 PM CST	Stephen F. Austin	0–3	Texas	Gregory Gymnasium, Austin, Texas; Attendance: N/A
November 29, 2018; 7:00 PM CST	(14–25, 17–25, 21–25)			Gregory Gymnasium, Austin, Texas; Attendance: N/A

November 29, 2018; 7:00 PM EST	FGCU	3–2	UCF	The Venue at UCF, Orlando, Florida; Attendance: 1,774
November 29, 2018; 7:00 PM EST	(17–25, 25–22, 25–23, 14–25, 15–7)			The Venue at UCF, Orlando, Florida; Attendance: 1,774

November 30, 2018; 4:00 PM EST	Michigan	3–0	Navy	Petersen Events Center, Pittsburgh, Pennsylvania; Attendance: 2,807
November 30, 2018; 4:00 PM EST	(25–23, 25–20, 25–10)			Petersen Events Center, Pittsburgh, Pennsylvania; Attendance: 2,807

November 30, 2018; 4:00 PM MST	Denver	0–3	Utah	Smith Fieldhouse, Provo, Utah; Attendance: 3,675
November 30, 2018; 4:00 PM MST	(23–25, 18–25, 25–27)			Smith Fieldhouse, Provo, Utah; Attendance: 3,675

November 30, 2018; 7:00 PM EST	Iona	0–3	Pitt	Petersen Events Center, Pittsburgh, Pennsylvania; Attendance: 2,807
November 30, 2018; 7:00 PM EST	(24–26, 18–25, 16–25)			Petersen Events Center, Pittsburgh, Pennsylvania; Attendance: 2,807

November 30, 2018; 7:00 PM MST	Stony Brook	0–3	BYU	Smith Fieldhouse, Provo, Utah; Attendance: 3,675
November 30, 2018; 7:00 PM MST	(20–25, 13–25, 12–25)			Smith Fieldhouse, Provo, Utah; Attendance: 3,675

==== Second round ====
November 30, 2018; 7:00 PM EST	FGCU	0–3	Florida	The Venue at UCF, Orlando, Florida; Attendance: 1,207
November 30, 2018; 7:00 PM EST	(17–25, 13–25, 17–25)			The Venue at UCF, Orlando, Florida; Attendance: 1,207

November 30, 2018; 8:00 PM CST	Texas State	0–3	Texas	Gregory Gymnasium, Austin, Texas; Attendance: 3,243
November 30, 2018; 8:00 PM CST	(14–25, 17–25, 14–25)			Gregory Gymnasium, Austin, Texas; Attendance: 3,243

December 1, 2018; 7:00 PM EST	Michigan	3–2	Pitt	Petersen Events Center, Pittsburgh, Pennsylvania; Attendance: 2,405
December 1, 2018; 7:00 PM EST	(19–25, 25–22, 25–17, 21–25, 15–9)			Petersen Events Center, Pittsburgh, Pennsylvania; Attendance: 2,405

December 1, 2018; 7:00 PM MST	Utah	0–3	BYU	Smith Fieldhouse, Provo, Utah; Attendance: 5,183
December 1, 2018; 7:00 PM MST	(16–25, 21–25, 18–25)			Smith Fieldhouse, Provo, Utah; Attendance: 5,183

==== Regional semifinals ====
December 7, 2018; 2:00 PM MST	Michigan	1-3	Texas	Smith Fieldhouse, Provo, Utah; Attendance: 5,104
December 7, 2018; 2:00 PM MST	(10-25, 29-27, 27-29, 19-25)			Smith Fieldhouse, Provo, Utah; Attendance: 5,104

December 7, 2018; 4:55 PM MST	Florida	1-3	BYU	Smith Fieldhouse, Provo, Utah; Attendance: 5,104
December 7, 2018; 4:55 PM MST	(25-23, 13-25, 17-25, 19-25)			Smith Fieldhouse, Provo, Utah; Attendance: 5,104

==== Regional Final ====
December 8, 2018; 6:00 PM MST	Texas	0–3	BYU	Smith Fieldhouse, Provo, Utah; Attendance: 5,326
December 8, 2018; 6:00 PM MST	(23–25, 23–25, 21–25)			Smith Fieldhouse, Provo, Utah; Attendance: 5,326

=== Illinois Regional ===
First round
3	Illinois	3
Eastern Michigan	0
Champaign, IL
Louisville	3
Dayton	0
Cincinnati	3
Illinois State	0
Milwaukee, WI
High Point	0
14	Marquette	3
11	USC	3
Samford	0
Los Angeles, CA
San Diego	3
Cal Poly	1
UNI	2
Pepperdine	3
Madison, WI
Green Bay	0
6	Wisconsin	3

Second round
3	Illinois	3
Louisville	1
Cincinnati	0
14	Marquette	3
11	USC	0
San Diego	3
Pepperdine	1
6	Wisconsin	3

Regional semifinals
3	Illinois	3
14	Marquette	0
San Diego	0
6	Wisconsin	3

Regional finals
3	Illinois	3
6	Wisconsin	1

=== Schedule ===
==== First round ====
November 29, 2018; 5:05 PM CST	Pepperdine	3–2	Northern Iowa	Wisconsin Field House, Madison, Wisconsin; Attendance: 5,453
November 29, 2018; 5:05 PM CST	(25–22, 25–21, 19–25, 20–25, 15–13)			Wisconsin Field House, Madison, Wisconsin; Attendance: 5,453

November 29, 2018; 7:35 PM CST	Green Bay	0–3	Wisconsin	Wisconsin Field House, Madison, Wisconsin; Attendance: 5,453
November 29, 2018; 7:35 PM CST	(9–25, 25–27, 15–25)			Wisconsin Field House, Madison, Wisconsin; Attendance: 5,453

November 30, 2018; 4:30 PM CST	Louisville	3–0	Dayton	Huff Hall, Champaign, Illinois; Attendance: 4,002
November 30, 2018; 4:30 PM CST	(25–21, 25–23, 25–21)			Huff Hall, Champaign, Illinois; Attendance: 4,002

November 30, 2018; 4:38 PM CST	Illinois State	0–3	Cincinnati	Al McGuire Center, Milwaukee, Wisconsin; Attendance: 1,761
November 30, 2018; 4:38 PM CST	(19–25, 22–25, 22–25)			Al McGuire Center, Milwaukee, Wisconsin; Attendance: 1,761

November 30, 2018; 6:00 PM PST	San Diego	3–1	Cal Poly	Galen Center, Los Angeles, California; Attendance: 712
November 30, 2018; 6:00 PM PST	(25–19, 25–18, 23–25, 25–22)			Galen Center, Los Angeles, California; Attendance: 712

November 30, 2018; 7:00 PM CST	Eastern Michigan	0–3	Illinois	Huff Hall, Champaign, Illinois; Attendance: 4,002
November 30, 2018; 7:00 PM CST	(14–25, 9–25, 20–25)			Huff Hall, Champaign, Illinois; Attendance: 4,002

November 30, 2018; 7:00 PM CST	High Point	0–3	Marquette	Al McGuire Center, Milwaukee, Wisconsin; Attendance: 1,761
November 30, 2018; 7:00 PM CST	(11–25, 19–25, 15–25)			Al McGuire Center, Milwaukee, Wisconsin; Attendance: 1,761

November 30, 2018; 8:00 PM PST	Samford	0–3	USC	Galen Center, Los Angeles, California; Attendance: 914
November 30, 2018; 8:00 PM PST	(18–25, 19–25, 14–25)			Galen Center, Los Angeles, California; Attendance: 914

==== Second round ====
November 30, 2018; 7:06 PM CST	Pepperdine	1–3	Wisconsin	Wisconsin Field House, Madison, Wisconsin; Attendance: 5,504
November 30, 2018; 7:06 PM CST	(16–25, 12–25, 25–15, 13–25)			Wisconsin Field House, Madison, Wisconsin; Attendance: 5,504

December 1, 2018; 7:00 PM CST	Louisville	1–3	Illinois	Huff Hall, Champaign, Illinois; Attendance: 3,754
December 1, 2018; 7:00 PM CST	(22–25, 28–26, 17–25, 18–25)			Huff Hall, Champaign, Illinois; Attendance: 3,754

December 1, 2018; 7:00 PM CST	Cincinnati	0–3	Marquette	Al McGuire Center, Milwaukee, Wisconsin; Attendance: 1,441
December 1, 2018; 7:00 PM CST	(19–25, 21–25, 16–25)			Al McGuire Center, Milwaukee, Wisconsin; Attendance: 1,441

December 1, 2018; 7:00 PM PST	San Diego	3–0	USC	Galen Center, Los Angeles, California; Attendance: 650
December 1, 2018; 7:00 PM PST	(27–25, 25–21, 25–19)			Galen Center, Los Angeles, California; Attendance: 650

==== Regional semifinals ====
December 7, 2018; 11:00 AM CST	Marquette	0–3	Illinois	Huff Hall, Champaign, Illinois; Attendance: 3,341
December 7, 2018; 11:00 AM CST	(19–25, 21–25, 16–25)			Huff Hall, Champaign, Illinois; Attendance: 3,341

December 7, 2018; 1:30 PM CST	San Diego	0–3	Wisconsin	Huff Hall, Champaign, Illinois; Attendance: 3,341
December 7, 2018; 1:30 PM CST	(13–25, 16–25, 10–25)			Huff Hall, Champaign, Illinois; Attendance: 3,341

==== Regional Final ====
December 8, 2018; 3:00 PM CST	Wisconsin	1–3	Illinois	Huff Hall, Champaign, Illinois; Attendance: 4,152
December 8, 2018; 3:00 PM CST	(19–25, 25–15, 22–25, 23–25)			Huff Hall, Champaign, Illinois; Attendance: 4,152

=== Minnesota Regional ===
First round
7	Nebraska	3
Hofstra	0
Lincoln, NE
Arizona	0
Missouri	3
Purdue	3
ETSU	0
Lexington, KY
Murray State	0
10	Kentucky	3
15	Oregon	3
New Mexico State	1
Eugene, OR
Hawaii	2
Baylor	3
South Carolina	3
Colorado	2
Minneapolis, MN
Bryant	0
2	Minnesota	3

Second round
7	Nebraska	3
Missouri	0
Purdue	0
10	Kentucky	3
15	Oregon	3
Baylor	2
South Carolina	0
2	Minnesota	3

Regional semifinals
7	Nebraska	3
10	Kentucky	0
15	Oregon	3
2	Minnesota	1

Regional finals
7	Nebraska	3
15	Oregon	0

=== Schedule ===
==== First round ====
November 29, 2018; 4:30 PM PST	Hawai'i	2–3	Baylor	Matthew Knight Arena, Eugene, Oregon; Attendance: 2,407
November 29, 2018; 4:30 PM PST	(25–23, 25–23, 14–25, 24–26, 14–16)			Matthew Knight Arena, Eugene, Oregon; Attendance: 2,407

November 29, 2018; 8:00 PM PST	New Mexico State	1–3	Oregon	Matthew Knight Arena, Eugene, Oregon; Attendance: 2,407
November 29, 2018; 8:00 PM PST	(22–25, 25–18, 21–25, 11–25)			Matthew Knight Arena, Eugene, Oregon; Attendance: 2,407

November 30, 2018; 4:35 PM CST	Arizona	0–3	Missouri	Bob Devaney Sports Center, Lincoln, Nebraska; Attendance: 8,358
November 30, 2018; 4:35 PM CST	(17–25, 22–25, 18–25)			Bob Devaney Sports Center, Lincoln, Nebraska; Attendance: 8,358

November 30, 2018; 4:38 PM CST	Colorado	2-3	South Carolina	Maturi Pavilion, Minneapolis, Minnesota; Attendance: 5,101
November 30, 2018; 4:38 PM CST	(32–34, 25–19, 12–25, 25–13, 13–15)			Maturi Pavilion, Minneapolis, Minnesota; Attendance: 5,101

November 30, 2018; 5:02 PM EST	East Tennessee State	0–3	Purdue	Memorial Coliseum, Lexington, Kentucky; Attendance: 2,881
November 30, 2018; 5:02 PM EST	(23–25, 7–25, 18–25)			Memorial Coliseum, Lexington, Kentucky; Attendance: 2,881

November 30, 2018; 7:00 PM CST	Hofstra	0–3	Nebraska	Bob Devaney Sports Center, Lincoln, Nebraska; Attendance: 8,358
November 30, 2018; 7:00 PM CST	(19–25, 12–25, 16–25)			Bob Devaney Sports Center, Lincoln, Nebraska; Attendance: 8,358

November 30, 2018; 7:32 PM EST	Murray State	0–3	Kentucky	Memorial Coliseum, Lexington, Kentucky; Attendance: 2,881
November 30, 2018; 7:32 PM EST	(18–25, 17–25, 19–25)			Memorial Coliseum, Lexington, Kentucky; Attendance: 2,881

November 30, 2018; 7:35 PM CST	Bryant	0–3	Minnesota	Maturi Pavilion, Minneapolis, Minnesota; Attendance: 5,101
November 30, 2018; 7:35 PM CST	(10–25, 16–25, 21–25)			Maturi Pavilion, Minneapolis, Minnesota; Attendance: 5,101

==== Second round ====
November 30, 2018; 7:04 PM PST	Baylor	2–3	Oregon	Matthew Knight Arena, Eugene, Oregon; Attendance: 2,508
November 30, 2018; 7:04 PM PST	(18–25, 25–13, 17–25, 25–22, 13–15)			Matthew Knight Arena, Eugene, Oregon; Attendance: 2,508

December 1, 2018; 7:00 PM CST	Missouri	0–3	Nebraska	Bob Devaney Sports Center, Lincoln, Nebraska; Attendance: 8,382
December 1, 2018; 7:00 PM CST	(14–25, 22–25, 18–25)			Bob Devaney Sports Center, Lincoln, Nebraska; Attendance: 8,382

December 1, 2018; 7:02 PM EST	Purdue	0–3	Kentucky	Memorial Coliseum, Lexington, Kentucky; Attendance: 2,794
December 1, 2018; 7:02 PM EST	(20–25, 21–25, 14–25)			Memorial Coliseum, Lexington, Kentucky; Attendance: 2,794

December 1, 2018; 8:05 PM CST	South Carolina	0–3	Minnesota	Maturi Pavilion, Minneapolis, Minnesota; Attendance: 5,155
December 1, 2018; 8:05 PM CST	(12–25, 15–25, 15–25)			Maturi Pavilion, Minneapolis, Minnesota; Attendance: 5,155

==== Regional semifinals ====
December 7, 2018; 1:00 PM CST	Kentucky	0–3	Nebraska	Maturi Pavilion, Minneapolis, Minnesota; Attendance: 5,187
December 7, 2018; 1:00 PM CST	(17–25, 20–25, 23–25)			Maturi Pavilion, Minneapolis, Minnesota; Attendance: 5,187

December 7, 2018; 3:30 PM CST	Oregon	3–1	Minnesota	Maturi Pavilion, Minneapolis, Minnesota; Attendance: 5,187
December 7, 2018; 3:30 PM CST	(21–25, 41–39, 25–21, 26–24)			Maturi Pavilion, Minneapolis, Minnesota; Attendance: 5,187

==== Regional Final ====
December 8, 2018; 5:00 PM CST	Oregon	0–3	Nebraska	Maturi Pavilion, Minneapolis, Minnesota; Attendance: 4,806
December 8, 2018; 5:00 PM CST	(22–25, 23–25, 17–25)			Maturi Pavilion, Minneapolis, Minnesota; Attendance: 4,806

== Final four ==
National semifinals
1	Stanford	3
4	BYU	0
3	Illinois	2
7	Nebraska	3

National Championship
1	Stanford	3
7	Nebraska	2

=== National semifinals ===
December 13, 2018; 7:00 PM	BYU	0–3	Stanford	Target Center, Minneapolis, Minnesota; Attendance: 17,808
December 13, 2018; 7:00 PM	(15–25, 15–25, 18–25)			Target Center, Minneapolis, Minnesota; Attendance: 17,808

December 13, 2018; 9:00 PM	Nebraska	3–2	Illinois	Target Center, Minneapolis, Minnesota; Attendance: 17,808
December 13, 2018; 9:00 PM	(22–25, 16–25, 25–23, 25–20, 15–11)			Target Center, Minneapolis, Minnesota; Attendance: 17,808

=== National Championship ===
December 15, 2018; 9:00 PM	Nebraska	2–3	Stanford	Target Center, Minneapolis, Minnesota; Attendance: 18,113
December 15, 2018; 9:00 PM	(26–28, 25–22, 16–25, 25–15, 12–15)			Target Center, Minneapolis, Minnesota; Attendance: 18,113

==== Final Four All-Tournament Team ====
- Kathryn Plummer – Stanford (Co-Most Outstanding Player)
- Morgan Hentz – Stanford (Co-Most Outstanding Player)
- Jenna Gray – Stanford
- Audriana Fitzmorris – Stanford
- Mikaela Foecke – Nebraska
- Lauren Stivrins – Nebraska
- Jacqueline Quade – Illinois

== Record by conference ==
Conference	Teams	W	L	Pct.	R32	S16	E8	F4	CM	NC
Pac-12	8	15	7	.682	6	4	2	1	1	1
Big Ten	7	20	7	.741	7	6	4	2	1	—
WCC	5	8	5	.615	4	2	1	1	—	—
Big 12	2	4	2	.667	2	1	1	—	—	—
SEC	5	7	5	.583	5	2	—	—	—	—
Big East	2	3	2	.600	2	1	—	—	—	—
ACC	5	3	5	.375	3	—	—	—	—	—
American	2	1	2	.333	1	—	—	—	—	—
Atlantic Sun	1	1	1	.500	1	—	—	—	—	—
Sun Belt	1	1	1	.500	1	—	—	—	—	—
Big West	2	0	2	.000	—	—	—	—	—	—
MVC	2	0	2	.000	—	—	—	—	—	—
SoCon	2	0	2	.000	—	—	—	—	—	—
Summit	2	0	2	.000	—	—	—	—	—	—
22 Others	22	0	22	.000	—	—	—	—	—	—

The columns R32, S16, E8, F4, CM, and NC respectively stand for the Round of 32, Sweet Sixteen, Elite Eight, Final Four, Championship Match, and National Champion.

== Media Coverage ==
First and second round matches will be streamed or televised by local school RSN's or streaming services. The 3rd round to the finals will all be streamed by WatchESPN or televised by ESPN Networks.

First & Second Rounds

- Ken Landis & Kyle Partain – Orlando, Florida (UCFKnights.tv)
- Paul Sunderland & Nell Fortner – Austin, Texas (LHN)
- Blaine Best – Madison, Wisconsin (BTN2Go)
- Kanoa Leahey & Chris McLauchlin – Eugene, Oregon (SPEC HI)
- Rich Burk & Nicole Rigonu – Eugene, Oregon (P12 OR)
- Josh Rowntree & Amanda Silay – Pittsburgh, Pennsylvania (ESPN3)
- Donny Baarns, Shannon Smolinski, & John Fanta – Omaha, Nebraska (FS Go)
- Dick Gabriel & Kathy DeBoer – Lexington, Kentucky (ESPN3 & SEC+)
- David Hadar – University Park, Pennsylvania (BTN2Go)
- Dean Linke & Audrey Flaugh – University Park, Pennsylvania (BTN)
- Paul Duchesne – Los Angeles, California (P12+)

Third & Fourth Rounds

- Courtney Lyle & Jenny Hazelwood – Stanford, California
- Sam Gore & Dain Blanton – Provo, Utah

Semifinals

- Paul Sunderland, Karch Kiraly, & Holly Rowe– Minneapolis, Minnesota

First & Second Rounds

- No commentary for UNI/Pepperdine, Syracuse/Yale, Arizona/Missouri, & Tennessee/Colorado State
- Stephen Cohn, Anton Pasquale (Fri), & Isaac Trotter (Sat) – Champaign, Illinois (BTN2Go)
- Ryan Russell & Chase Thomas – Minneapolis, Minnesota (BTN2Go)
- Mike Monaco & Laura Bush – Minneapolis, Minnesota (BTN)
- Larry Punteney & Kathi Wieskamp – Lincoln, Nebraska (NET)
- Chris Reisner, Jack Phillips, & Dan Avington – Milwaukee, Wisconsin (MUTV)
- Robbie Bullough – Provo, Utah (TheW.tv)
- Spencer Linton, Kristen Kozlowski, & Jason Shepherd (Fri) – Provo, Utah (BYUtv)
- Steve Grubbs – Pullman, Washington (P12+)
- Anthony Passarelli & Ted Enberg – Stanford, California (P12+)
- Ted Enberg & Rich Fellner – Stanford, California (P12 BAY)

Third & Fourth Rounds

- Tiffany Greene & Missy Whittemore – Champaign, Illinois
- Paul Sunderland & Karch Kiraly – Minneapolis, Minnesota

National Championship

- Paul Sunderland, Karch Kiraly, & Holly Rowe– Minneapolis, Minnesota
