= Diederich College of Communication =

College at Marquette University

Coordinates: 43.038348°N 87.926787°W

J. William & Mary Diederich College of Communication
- Type: Private
- Established: 1910
- Affiliations: Catholic, Jesuit
- Dean: Sarah Feldner
- Academic staff: 87
- Location: Milwaukee, WI, United States
- Campus: Urban
- Website: marquette.edu/communication/

The J. William & Mary Diederich College of Communication (or simply Diederich College of Communication) is one of the primary colleges at Marquette University, located in Milwaukee, Wisconsin. The college is named for J. William Diederich, a former executive at Landmark Media Enterprises, and his wife, Mary.

== History ==
The College of Communication was founded in 1910 as the School of Journalism. Decades later, the School of Journalism merged with the Schools of Performing Arts, Speech and Communication to form what is now the College of Communication. In May 2005, Bill and Mary Diederich, both graduates of the university, donated $28 million to support the college. At the time, it was the single largest gift to Marquette, and the university renamed the college as the J. William and Mary Diederich College of Communication in their honor.

Since 1975, the college has been housed in Johnston Hall, one of the oldest buildings on Marquette's campus and the only one owned by the university to be listed on the National Register of Historic Places.

In 2017, the college celebrated 100 years of student media, including print and digital news reporting, literary writing, television and radio.

== Programs ==
The Diederich College of Communication offers bachelor's and master's degrees as well as accelerated and dual-degree programs. Undergraduate majors and minors administered by the college include Advertising, Digital Media, Communication Studies, Corporate Communication, Journalism, Media Studies, Public Relations, and Theatre Arts.

== Alumni ==
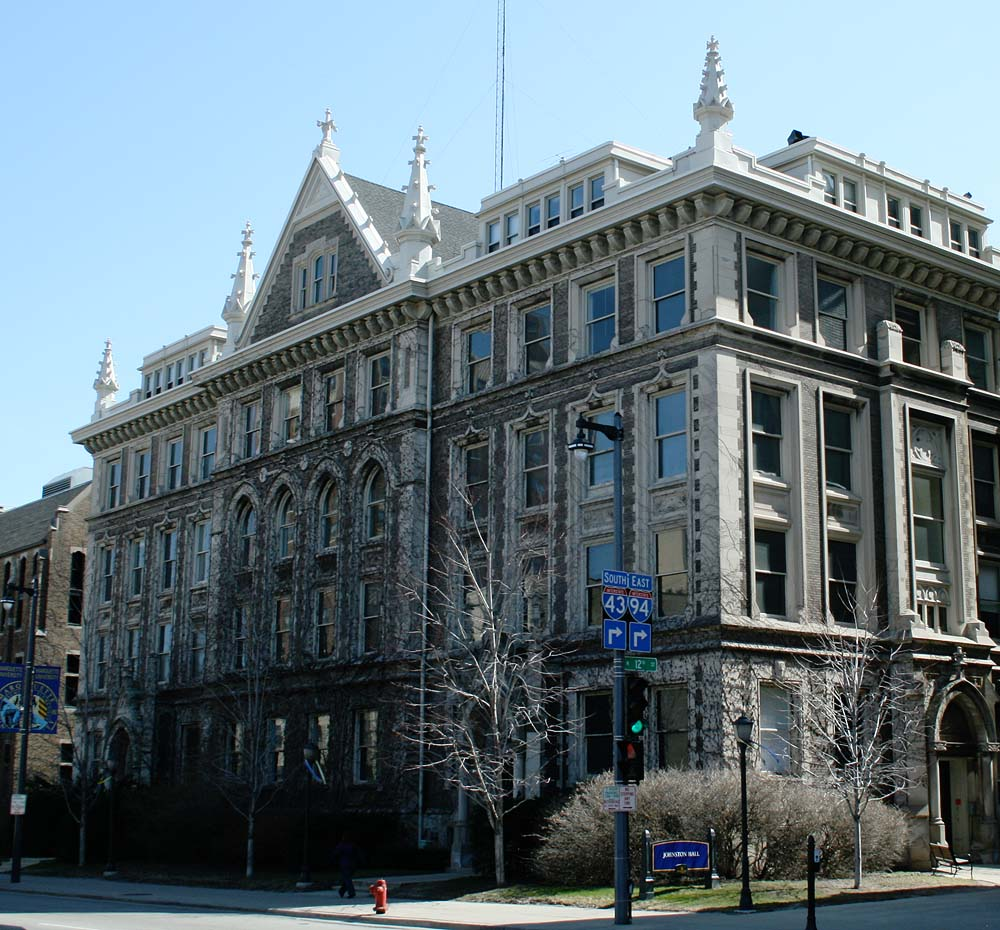
Johnston Hall, home to the college

Prominent individuals who have attended the College of Communication include:

- Adam Stockhausen, Academy Award winner in production design
- Cheryl Pawelski, Grammy-winning record producer and founder/owner of Omnivore Recordings

== See also ==
- Marquette University Student Media
