= Marquette University Student Media =

College radio station at Marquette University

Marquette Wire
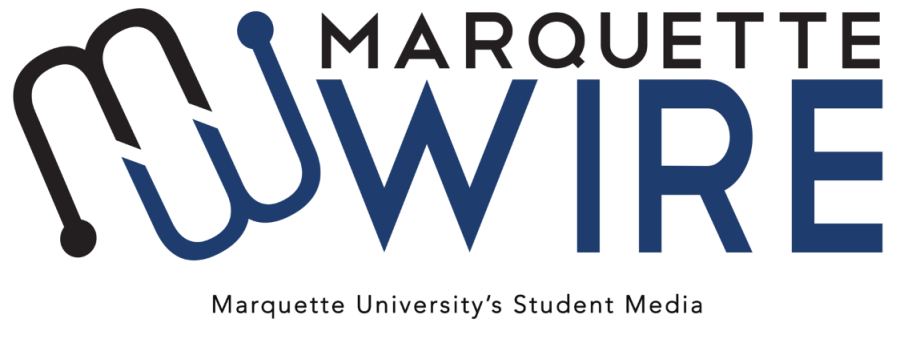
- Formation: 2014
- Purpose: Real-world journalism experience for students
- Headquarters: Milwaukee, WI
- Location: Milwaukee, WI
- Region served: Milwaukee, WI
- Production Director: Izzy Fonfara Drewel
- Print Production Manager: Clara Lebrón
- Executive News Editor: Mia Thurow
- Executive Opinions Editor: Joseph Schamber
- Parent organization: Marquette University
- Affiliations: Marquette University, MTVu
- Staff: 50+
- Website: https://marquettewire.org/

Marquette Wire is the official outlet of Marquette University's student media, supported by the university's Diederich College of Communication, which allows students to gain real-world experience in producing mainstream media. Students studying journalism, digital media and other related fields can gain experience through writing, editing, producing and publishing content relating to Marquette and the surrounding Milwaukee community.

The organization has won numerous awards, including ones from the Society of Professional Journalists, Midwest Broadcast Journalists Association, Milwaukee Press Club, Wisconsin Broadcasters Association, and Wisconsin Newspaper Association. The group has also won a collegiate Emmy.

== Outlets ==
The Marquette Wire has four outlets:

- Marquette Tribune, the student-run weekly newspaper
- Marquette Journal, the student-run semesterly magazine
- Marquette University Television (MUTV), the student-run television station
- Marquette University Radio (MUR), the student-run radio station

== History ==
Marquette University Student Media traces its roots back to 1904, when the Marquette Journal, the student-produced magazine, was first published. Since then, four additional outlets have opened: the Marquette Tribune in 1916, Marquette Radio in the 1960s, Marquette University Television in 1976.

The Marquette Wire was formed in 2014, the first time in the school's history that individual publication and broadcast outlets have united under one parent organization.

They have produced publications in both CMYK and black and white.

== Staff ==
Each outlet of the Marquette Wire is headed by an undergraduate student. The College of Communication posts applications and hold interviews at the end of each academic year, during which the directors of the outlets are selected for the next academic year. The Wire's executive director and managers are hired by the school's Board of Student Media, while the rest of positions are filled internally. Patrick Johnson is the Director of Student Media and faculty in the College of Communication.

== Location ==
The Marquette Wire is based on the second floor of Johnston Hall, home of the Diederich College of Communication. The college received a $3.5 million donation in 2014, which was ultimately used to build a new student media center. The Wire is now housed in that new center, which included an updated newsroom, a new radio booth, a new control room for the television station, improved offices, and a virtual reality green screen studio with a state-of-the art robotic camera and software for television broadcasts.

The Marquette Wire was originally housed in the basement of Johnston Hall, where the newsroom, radio booth, and some offices were located.

=== Convergence ===
In 2006, the college began executing plans to converge all outlets of Student Media into a single location, instead of being spread all over the building. The basement of Johnston Hall was chosen as the location, and was partially remodeled during the summer of 2008.

When Dr. John Pauly, formerly Dean of the College of Communication, was promoted to the position of university provost in April 2008, convergence plans came to a halt. The broadcasting outlets of Marquette Student Media (MUTV and MUR) did not move to the basement of Johnston Hall as originally intended. However, other plans of convergence continued, namely the addition of two conference rooms, the relocation of an unused computer lab, and the relocation of the Student Media Business office.

=== Notable alumni ===
- Steve Rushin, author and former sports reporter for Sports Illustrated
- Jen Lada, ESPN reporter and host of College Football Live
- Sophia Minnaert, digital content director for the Milwaukee Brewers

== Marquette University Radio ==
Marquette Radio
- Milwaukee, WI
- Frequency: None (online only)

Programming
- Format: College

Ownership
- Owner: Marquette University

History
- Former call signs: WMUR

Links
- Webcast: Listen live
- Website: Marquette Wire

Marquette University Radio (MUR) is the student-run College radio station for Marquette University in Milwaukee, Wisconsin, United States.

== About ==
Marquette Radio broadcasts on campus via Cable radio channel 96 and to the world through the live stream online. Marquette Radio is open to all current Marquette University students and offers diverse programming including talk, sports, news and music intensive shows. Students from all fields are invited to practice their skills in production, announcing, public relations, advertising sales, and record company relations.

Beginning October 1, 2013, the station released a new logo and officially dropped the call letters WMUR to distance itself from terrestrial broadcasting. Since 2013, Marquette Radio has been part of Marquette Student Media, known online as the "Marquette Wire."

== Marquette University Television ==
MUTV
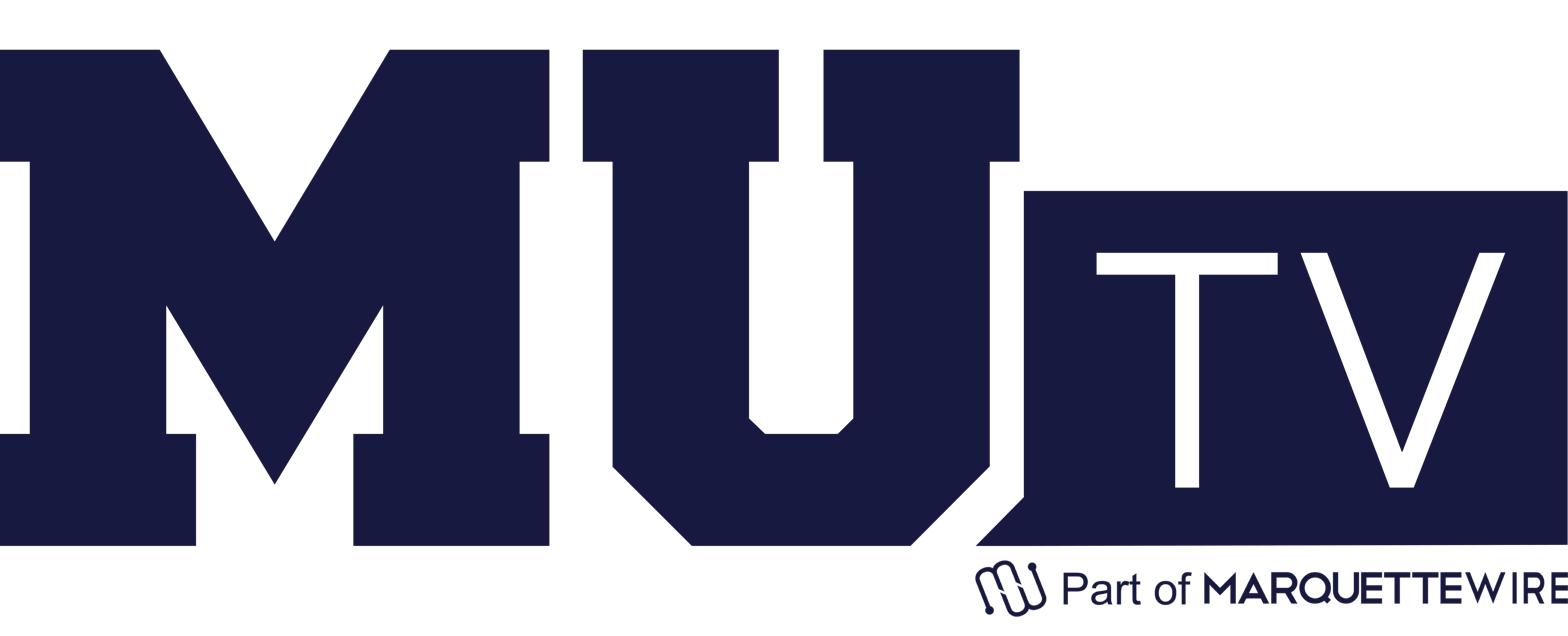
- Johnston Hall, 1131 W. Wisconsin Ave. #206 Milwaukee, Wisconsin 53233
- City: Milwaukee, WI
- Channels: Analog: 4 (CCTV - Cable); Digital: 4-1
- Branding: MUTV

Programming
- Affiliations: mtvU, Marquette Wire

Ownership
- Owner: Marquette University

History
- Founded: 1976
- Call sign meaning: Marquette; University; TeleVision

Technical information
- Translator(s): marquettewire.org

Links
- Website: MUTV on the Marquette Wire

Marquette University Television (MUTV) is a student television station at the Diederich College of Communication at Marquette University. The students produce shows every Monday and Wednesday nights for the entertainment, news, and sports departments. Marquette Radio also produces a live music show every week. Packages and broadcasts are retransmitted over the channel as well as available on YouTube.

=== About ===
Marquette University Television was chartered by Marquette University in 1976 and is a registered student organization within the university. MUTV was formed through the work of Bob Turner, former head of the Instructional Media Center, students Steve Olson and George Wensel, and other students and Marquette faculty and staff. Kenneth Shuler, a former engineer, helped make MUTV possible by running the campus cable system. Many of the original engineers died in a plane crash in the 1970s that nearly crippled the program's success. George Wensel, who later went on to be a major force in sports telecasts and has a Sports Emmy Award named in his honor, died in a drowning accident in 1995. The college keeps the memories of Ken, Bob, and George alive through annual scholarships awarded to creative and innovative broadcasting students.

Since 2014, MUTV has been a part of the Marquette Wire, Marquette's student media organization, along with the Marquette Tribune (newspaper), MUR (radio), and Marquette Journal (magazine).

In 2017 a renovation of the second floor of Johnston Hall began and was completed in 2018. The new facilities include student media executive office spaces, a newsroom overlooking Wisconsin Avenue, a control room, television studio space, a virtual studio space, updated video switcher and other broadcast equipment, and an on-air MUR radio and podcasting studio. These facilities will be used by student media, but they are also available to the entire College of Communication.

=== Specials ===
MUTV occasionally runs special programs during the year.

- Marquette University Student Government Election Show - The day of the annual MUSG election, MUTV produces a one-hour newscast featuring packages and live interviews with the President and EVP candidates.
- Marquette Presidential Address - MUTV broadcasts the annual Presidential Address.
- Election Night coverage - MUTV covers every U.S. federal election live, including midterm elections.

=== Staff ===
MUTV was started by students and continues to be student run. It is led by the executive director, as selected by the Student Media Board at the end of each academic year. As of 2014, MUTV is an outlet of the Marquette Wire, Marquette Student Media. The current executive director is Hope Moses.

=== Production ===
MUTV production is based on the second floor of Johnston Hall at Marquette University.

==== Studio 7 ====
Studio 7 is a 2-story, 30' x 45' sound stage with fifteen mobile lighting grids for easy light placement and focusing.

==== Studio 6 ====
Studio 6 is a single-story, 20' x 25' studio with a stationary lighting grid. In the summer of 2017, a wrap-around green screen cyc wall was installed, preparing for the installation of Ross Video virtual set technology.

=== Remotes ===
In the early days of MUTV, Big Fred and Little Fred were remote trucks that enabled MUTV to go shoot events such as Marquette men's basketball games. The trucks were hand-built by the engineers and students, one of them originally being a used bread truck. MUTV broadcast Men's Basketball on a tape delay since a microwave transmitter was not available. 3/4" tape was driven from the Milwaukee Arena to Johnston Hall. A microwave transmitter was eventually purchased, but it was almost immediately struck by lightning and rendered useless. In the late 1970s, live remotes were done from the Helfaer Sports complex, Wilson Park ice arena, and in front of LaLumiere Hall, the school's dedicated languages building.

A remote fly-pack was built at the start of the 2006–2007 school year, utilizing equipment replaced during that summer's digital upgrade. The kit was a valuable tool for MUTV, allowing them to do remotes once again. The kit has traveled to the Al McGuire Center, Bradley Center, Weasler Auditorium, Varsity Theater, and Alumni Memorial Union to broadcast sporting events, political debates, and other events. The students utilized both the equipment in the fly-pack and equipment in the Johnston Hall control rooms (video and CG support) to make the broadcasts successful. Video is sent to Johnston Hall over a network of fiber optic converters placed in key buildings on the Marquette campus. A telephone link between intercom systems allows seamless communication between the remote and Johnston Hall.

The remote fly-pack was eventually upgraded with a Blackmagic Design ATEM production switcher, enabling HD broadcasting remotely. As the facilities in Johnston Hall were still standard definition, remote broadcasts weren't able to utilize that equipment. In the fall of 2017, MUTV acquired a Comrex LiveShot to enable remote cameras as well as an easier way to route remote broadcasts back to Johnston Hall. With Johnston Hall's recent renovations, live remotes are now able to be routed directly to the control room, where MUTV staff are able to assist in live replays and on-screen graphics.

=== Programming/distribution ===
MUTV utilizes Public-access television cable TV channel 4.1 on the Time Warner Cable feed to the Marquette campus. MUTV operates on channel 4.1 Monday through Thursday, 6:30 PM to 9:30 PM. mtvU is aired on the channel during off-air hours.

MUTV launched their first Video-on-Demand service in fall of 2003. Shortly after, the project was suspended due to workflow inefficiencies. The service was revived in spring of 2007, taking the form of a UFO-based Flash Video player. In February 2008, MUTV acquired access to one of the university's QuickTime Streaming Servers and thus converted their Video on Demand Service to QuickTime. An ongoing initiative to have all MUTV shows available in Video-on-Demand is continued by the Programming/Distribution Department. In 2008, MUTV purchased a Mac Pro to handle the duties of putting content online on the MUTV Website and YouTube. As of 2017, all video packages and shows are uploaded to YouTube and embedded on the Marquette Wire website.

A live stream of MUTV programming is available in the All-Access player at MarquetteWire.org.

=== Logos ===
MUTV 5 logo
197x - 198x

MUTV box/cube logo
199x - 2006

MUTV Armadillo logo
May 2006 - May 2007

MUTV 99 logo
May 2007 – Spring 2017

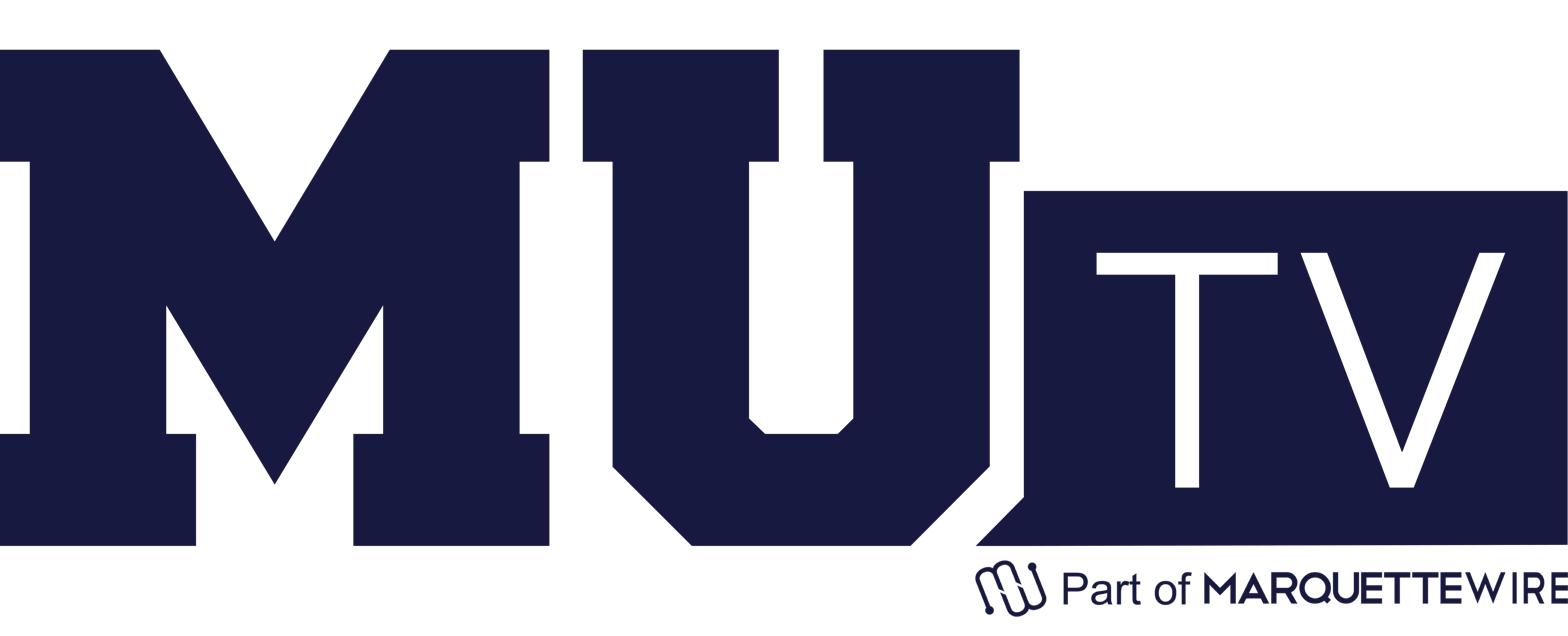
MUTV Logo
Fall 2017–Present

== See also ==
- Student Media Interactive
