= 2017 Utah Valley Wolverines volleyball team =

American college volleyball season

2017 Utah Valley Wolverines women's volleyball
- Conference: Western Athletic Conference
- Record: 12–13 (7–3 WAC)
- Head coach: Sam Atoa (19th season)
- Assistant coaches: Dan Corotan (3rd season); Scott Lee (11th season)
- Home arena: Lockhart Arena

The 2017 Utah Valley Wolverines volleyball team represented Utah Valley University in the 2017 NCAA Division I women's volleyball season. The Wolverines were led by nineteenth year head coach Sam Atoa and played their home games at Lockhart Arena. The Wolverines were members of the WAC.

Utah Valley comes off a season where they finished second in the WAC. For 2017 the Wolverines were picked to finish third in the pre-season WAC poll behind New Mexico State and UTRGV.

2017 Western Athletic Conference volleyball standings
	Conf.				Overall
Team	W		L	PCT	W		L	PCT
New Mexico State ‍‍‍	8	–	2	.800	17	–	7	.708
UTRGV ‍‍‍	7	–	3	.700	13	–	10	.565
Utah Valley ‍‍‍	7	–	3	.700	12	–	13	.480
CSU Bakersfield ‍‍‍	7	–	4	.636	14	–	12	.538
Seattle ‍‍‍	5	–	5	.500	9	–	14	.391
Kansas City ‍‍‍	4	–	7	.364	8	–	16	.333
Grand Canyon ‍‍‍	3	–	8	.273	8	–	15	.348
Chicago State ‍‍‍	1	–	10	.091	10	–	17	.370
† – Conference champion: y- Invited to the NCAA volleyball tournament As of 2017-09-30 Rankings from AVCA

== Season highlights ==
Season highlights will be filled in as the season progresses.

== Roster ==
2017 Utah Valley Wolverines roster
Defensive Specialist/Libero: 3 Lindsey Tagge - Junior; 4 Brynnly Ward - Freshman; 6 Seren Merrill - Freshman; Setters: 2 Sierra Starley - Senior; 7 Madi Wardle - Sophomore; Right Side Hitter: 11 Izzie Hinton - Sophomore	Outside hitters: 8 Marija Martinovic- Senior; 10 Bailey Nixon- (redshirt) Freshman; 15 Alexis Davies - Junior; 16 Kristen Allred - Freshman; 17 Lexi Thompson - Senior	Middle blockers: 1 Makayla Pollard - Freshman; 5 Megan Boudreaux- (redshirt) Sophomore; 9 Brighton Taylor - Senior; 12 Jasmine Niutupuivaha - Sophomore; 18 Madison Dennison - Senior

== Schedule ==
Date Time	Opponent	Rank	Arena City (Tournament)	Television	Result	Attendance	Record (WAC Record)
8/25; 3 p.m.	vs. Pepperdine		Spartan Gym; San Jose, CA (SJSU/USF Invitational)		L 3–1 (25–19, 23–25, 25–20, 29–27)	104	0–1
8/25; 5:30 p.m.	vs. Fresno State		Spartan Gym; San Jose, CA (SJSU/USF Invitational)	MW Net	L 3–1 (25–16, 25–17, 24–26, 25–22)	107	0–2
8/26; 3 p.m.	vs. Nevada		The Sobrato Center; San Francisco, CA (SJSU/USF Invitational)		L 3–1 (25–17, 20–25, 25–14, 25–19)	96	0–3
8/29; 6 p.m.	@ Southern Utah		Centrum Arena; Cedar City, UT	Pluto TV Ch. 236	W 3–0 (25–18, 25–15, 25–22)	1,156	1–3
8/31; 5:30 p.m.	#9 Kansas		Lockhart Arena; Orem, UT (Wolverine Invitational)	Flo Volleyball; WAC DN	L 3–0 (25–20, 25–19, 25–23)	1,048	1–4
9/01; 12 p.m.	Montana		Lockhart Arena; Orem, UT (Wolverine Invitational)	Flo Volleyball; WAC DN	W 3–0 (25–15, 26–24, 25–16)	491	2–4
9/02; 12 p.m.	Long Beach State		Lockhart Arena; Orem, UT (Wolverine Invitational)	Flo Volleyball; WAC DN	W 3–1 (25–21, 12–25, 27–25, 25–18)	459	3–4
9/04; 6 p.m.	@ Idaho State		Holt Arena; Pocatello, ID	Pluto TV Ch. 243	W 3–1 (26–24, 21–25, 25–22, 25–20)	561	4–4
9/05; 6 p.m.	@ Utah State		Wayne Estes Center; Logan, UT	MW Net	W 3–1 (18–25, 25–18, 26–24, 25–15)	718	5–4
9/08; 2 p.m.	vs. Lehigh		University Recreation Center; Fort Worth, TX (TCU Fight in the Fort)		L 3–0 (25–20, 25–17, 25–19)	1,298	5–5
9/09; 10 a.m.	vs. Duke		University Recreation Center; Fort Worth, TX (TCU Fight in the Fort)		L 3–2 (21–25, 25–19, 15–25, 25–23, 15–4)	1,169	5–6
9/09; 6 p.m.	@ TCU		University Recreation Center; Fort Worth, TX (TCU Fight in the Fort)	Frog Vision	L 3–0 (25–22, 25–16, 25–21)	1,169	5–7
9/13; 8 p.m.	@ Weber State		Swenson Gym; Ogden, UT	Pluto TV Ch. 235	L 3–1 (26–24, 25–20, 14–25, 25–23)	478	5–8
9/15; 5 p.m.	#16 Utah		Lockhart Arena; Orem, UT	WAC DN	L 3–1 (19–25, 25–18, 25–16, 25–22)	1,081	5–9
9/16; 7 p.m.	#14 BYU		Lockhart Arena; Orem, UT (UCCU Crosstown Clash)	UVUtv; WAC DN	L 3–1 (25–21, 22–25, 26–24, 25–17)	1,726	5–10
9/23; 4 p.m.	@ Seattle*		Connolly Center; Seattle, WA	WAC DN	W 3–0 (25–17, 25–21, 25–21)	257	6–10 (1–0)
9/28; 7 p.m.	@ Grand Canyon*		GCU Arena; Phoenix, AZ	GCU TV; WAC DN	W 3–1 (25–15, 25–18, 25–27, 25–22)	959	7–10 (2–0)
9/30; 1 p.m.	@ CSU Bakersfield*		Icardo Center; Bakersfield, CA	WAC DN	L 3–2 (28–26, 22–25, 23–25, 25–16, 17–15)	439	7–11 (2–1)
10/05; 7 p.m.	UTRGV*		Lockhart Arena; Orem, UT	WAC DN	L 3–1 (24–26, 25–21, 25–12, 25–21)	602	7–12 (2–2)
10/07; 1 p.m.	New Mexico State*		Lockhart Arena; Orem, UT	WAC DN	W 3–2 (22–25, 25–17, 22–25, 25–20, 15–10)	487	8–12 (3–2)
10/12; 6 p.m.	@ Chicago State*		Dickens Athletic Center; Chicago, IL	WAC DN	W 3–0 (25–21, 25–22, 25–19)	52	9–12 (4–2)
10/14; 12 p.m.	@ Kansas City*		Swinney Recreation Center; Kansas City, MO	WAC DN	W 3–1 (27–29, 25–14, 25–21, 25–18)	179	10–12 (5–2)
10/21; 1 p.m.	Seattle*		Lockhart Arena; Orem, UT	WAC DN	L 3–2 (22–25, 25–22, 25–22, 20–25, 15–10)	527	10–13 (5–3)
10/26; 7 p.m.	CSU Bakersfield*		Lockhart Arena; Orem, UT	WAC DN	W 3–0 (25–14, 27–25, 25–16)	692	11–13 (6–3)
10/28; 1 p.m.	Grand Canyon*		Lockhart Arena; Orem, UT	WAC DN	W 3–0 (25–19, 25–17, 25–18)	459	12–13 (7–3)
11/02; 7 p.m.	@ New Mexico State*		Pan American Center; Las Cruces, NM	WAC DN			
11/04; 11 a.m.	@ UTRGV*		UTRGV Fieldhouse; Edinburg, TX	WAC DN			
11/09; 7 p.m.	Kansas City*		Lockhart Arena; Orem, UT	WAC DN			
11/11; 1 p.m.	Chicago State*		Lockhart Arena; Orem, UT	WAC DN			
11/16; TBA			UTRGV Fieldhouse; Edinburg, TX (WAC Volleyball Tournament)	WAC DN			

*-Indicates Conference Opponent
y-Indicates NCAA Playoffs
Times listed are Mountain Time Zone.

== Announcers for televised games ==
All home games will be on the WAC Digital Network. Select road games will also be televised or streamed.

- Fresno State: No commentary
- Southern Utah: No commentary
- Kansas: Matthew Baiamonte & Kyle Bruderer
- Montana: Matthew Baiamonte & Kyle Bruderer
- Long Beach State: Matthew Baiamonte & Kyle Bruderer
- Idaho State: Cade Vance & Matt Steuart
- Utah State: Daniel Hansen & Meagan Nelson
- TCU: Jeff Williams
- Weber State: Kylee Young
- Utah: Matthew Baiamonte & Kyle Bruderer
- BYU: Matthew Baiamonte & Kyle Bruderer
- Seattle: No commentary
- Grand Canyon: Alex Larson & JP Sar
- CSU Bakersfield: Randy Rosenbloom
- UTRGV: Matthew Baiamonte & Kyle Bruderer
- New Mexico State: Matthew Baiamonte & Kyle Bruderer
- Chicago State: No commentary
- Kansas City: TJ Jackson
- Seattle: Matthew Baiamonte & Kyle Bruderer
- CSU Bakersfield: Matthew Baiamonte & Kyle Bruderer
- Grand Canyon: Matthew Baiamonte & Kyle Bruderer
- New Mexico State:
- UTRGV:
- Kansas City: Matthew Baiamonte & Kyle Bruderer
- Chicago State: Matthew Baiamonte & Kyle Bruderer
