= 2017 Utah State Aggies women's volleyball team =

American college volleyball season

2017 Utah State Aggies women's volleyball
- Conference: Mountain West Conference
- Record: 12–10 (4–6 MW)
- Head coach: Grayson DuBose (12th season)
- Assistant coaches: Taubi Palmer (11th season); Sammi Stuart (3rd season)
- Home arena: Wayne Estes Center

The 2017 Utah State Aggies women's volleyball team team represented Utah State University in the 2017 NCAA Division I women's volleyball season. The Aggies were led by twelfth year head coach Grayson DuBose and played their home games at the Wayne Estes Center. The Aggies were members of the Mountain West.

Utah State came off a season where they finished 8–10 in conference, 14–16 overall, good for seventh in the conference. Coming into 2017 the Aggies were picked to finish sixth in the pre-season Mountain West poll.

2017 Mountain West Conference volleyball standings
	Conf.				Overall
Team	W		L	PCT	W		L	PCT
No. 20 Colorado State ‍‍‍	11	–	0	1.000	21	–	2	.913
Wyoming ‍‍‍	7	–	4	.636	12	–	11	.522
San Jose State ‍‍‍	6	–	4	.600	14	–	7	.667
Boise State ‍‍‍	5	–	5	.500	12	–	10	.545
San Diego State ‍‍‍	5	–	5	.500	11	–	12	.478
Utah State ‍‍‍	4	–	6	.400	12	–	10	.545
Fresno State ‍‍‍	4	–	6	.400	9	–	13	.409
UNLV ‍‍‍	4	–	6	.400	8	–	15	.348
Nevada ‍‍‍	4	–	6	.400	6	–	16	.273
New Mexico ‍‍‍	3	–	7	.300	11	–	12	.478
Air Force ‍‍‍	3	–	7	.300	10	–	14	.417
† – Conference champion y- Invited to the NCAA volleyball tournament As of 2017-10-26; Rankings from AVCA

== Season highlights ==
Season highlights will be filled in as the season progresses.

== Roster ==
2017 Utah State Aggies roster
Defensive Specialist/Libero: 2 Tasia Taylor - Junior; 8 Madi Olson - (redshirt) Freshman; 3 Thamires Cavalcanti - Senior; Setters: 5 Jaysa Funk - (redshirt) Freshman; 6 Kassidy Johnson - Junior; 10 Halle Evans - Sophomore	Outside hitters: 3 Lauren Anderson - Senior; 4 Ashlee Thornock - (redshirt) Freshman; 7 Ally Packard - Junior; 26 Rachel Gale-Hammond - Senior; 39 Gabbi Shumway - Freshman	Middle blockers: 9 Bailey Downing - Freshman; 10 Lauren O'Brien - Junior; 13 Carly Lenzen - Senior; 14 Ashley Wesenberg - Sophomore; Opposite hitter: 11 Kayla DeCoursey - Senior

== Schedule ==
Date Time	Opponent	Rank	Arena City (Tournament)	Television	Result	Attendance	Record (MWC Record)
8/25; 3 p.m.	vs. UL Monroe		Barnhill Arena; Fayetteville, AR (Arkansas Classic)		W 3–0 (25–17, 25–15, 25–20)	175	1–0
8/26; 11:00 a.m.	vs. CS Bakersfield		Barnhill Arena; Fayetteville, AR (Arkansas Classic)		W 3–1 (25–16, 21–25, 25–20, 26–24)	563	2–0
8/26; 6 p.m.	@ Arkansas		Barnhill Arena; Fayetteville, AR (Arkansas Classic)	SEC+	L 3–0 (25–23, 25–15, 25–19)	832	2–1
9/01; 7 p.m.	Pacific		Wayne Estes Center; Logan, UT (Utah State Invitational)	MW Net	W 3–2 (23–25, 25–19, 25–20, 22–25, 15–10)	562	3–1
9/02; 12 p.m.	Montana State		Wayne Estes Center; Logan, UT (Utah State Invitational)	MW Net	L 3–1 (25–20, 25–18, 27–29, 25–19)	480	3–2
9/02; 7 p.m.	UC Santa Barbara		Wayne Estes Center; Logan, UT (Utah State Invitational)	MW Net	W 3–0 (25–20, 25–15, 25–19)	550	4–2
9/05; 7 p.m.	Utah Valley		Wayne Estes Center; Logan, UT (Utah State Invitational)	MW Net	L 3–1 (18–25, 25–18, 26–24, 25–15)	718	4–3
9/08; 1 p.m.	@ Northern Arizona		Walkup Skydome; Flagstaff, AZ (Lumberjack Classic)	Pluto TV Ch. 239	W 3–1 (23–25, 25–18, 25–23, 25–18)	302	5–3
9/08; 5 p.m.	vs. CS Bakersfield		Walkup Skydome; Flagstaff, AZ (Lumberjack Classic)		W 3–0 (25–23, 25–22, 25–18)	125	6–3
9/09; 11 a.m.	Arizona State		Walkup Skydome; Flagstaff, AZ (Lumberjack Classic)		L 3–0 (28–26, 25–20, 25–15)	153	6–4
9/12; 7 p.m.	@ Weber State		Swenson Gym; Ogden, UT	Pluto TV Ch. 235	W 3–0 (25–21, 25–20, 25–16)	436	7–4
9/15; 7 p.m.	@ Southern Utah		Centrum Arena; Cedar City, UT	Pluto TV Ch. 236	W 3–1 (26–24, 25–18, 29–25, 25–17)	1,447	8–4
9/21; 7 p.m.	San Diego State*		Wayne Estes Center; Logan, UT	MW Net	W 3–1 (25–21, 23–25, 25–14, 25–19)	815	9–4 (1–0)
9/23; 1 p.m.	Fresno State*		Wayne Estes Center; Logan, UT	MW Net	W 3–1 (25–21, 19–25, 25–18, 25–16)	901	10–4 (2–0)
9/28; 7 p.m.	@ UNLV*		Cox Pavilion; Las Vegas, NV	MW Net	W 3–1 (25–18, 25–17, 24–26, 25–18)	366	11–4 (3–0)
9/30; 2 p.m.	@ New Mexico*		Johnson Gymnasium; Albuquerque, NM	MW Net	L 3–0 (25–20, 25–22, 25–17)	825	11–5 (3–1)
10/05; 7 p.m.	Wyoming*		Wayne Estes Center; Logan, UT	MW Net	L 3–0 (25–20, 25–18, 25–12)	832	11–6 (3–2)
10/07; 8 p.m.	#23 Colorado State*		Wayne Estes Center; Logan, UT	MW Net	L 3–0 (25–19, 25–19, 26–24)	646	11–7 (3–3)
10/10; 7 p.m.	Boise State*		Wayne Estes Center; Logan, UT	MW Net	W 3–0 (25–17, 25–19, 25–19)	809	12–7 (4–3)
10/12; 6:30 p.m.	@ Air Force*		Cadet East Gym; Colorado Springs, CO		L 3–1 (26–24, 25–21, 24–26, 25–17)	319	12–8 (4–4)
10/19; 8 p.m.	@ Fresno State*		Save Mart Center; Fresno, CA	MW Net	L 3–1 (25–17, 18–25, 25–23, 25–17)	712	12–9 (4–5)
10/21; 2 p.m.	@ San Diego State*		Peterson Gym; San Diego, CA	MW Net	L 3–1 (25–24, 25–23, 21–25, 25–14)	279	12–10 (4–6)
10/26; 7 p.m.	New Mexico*		Wayne Estes Center; Logan, UT	MW Net			
10/28; 12 p.m.	UNLV*		Wayne Estes Center; Logan, UT	MW Net			
11/02; 7 p.m.	@ Colorado State*		Moby Arena; Ft. Collins, CO	MW Net			
11/04; 7 p.m.	@ Wyoming*		Uniwyo Sports Complex; Laramie, WY	MW Net			
11/07; 7:30 p.m.	@ Boise State*		Bronco Gym; Boise, ID	MW Net			
11/11; 7 p.m.	Air Force*		Wayne Estes Center; Logan, UT	MW Net			
11/16; 7 p.m.	Nevada*		Wayne Estes Center; Logan, UT	MW Net			
11/18; 3 p.m.	@ San Jose State*		Spartan Gym; San Jose, CA	MW Net			

*-Indicates Conference Opponent
y-Indicates NCAA Playoffs
Times listed are Mountain Time Zone.

== Announcers for televised games ==
All home games will be on the MW Network powered by Stadium. Select road games will also be televised or streamed.

- Arkansas: Brett Dolan & Caitlin Donahoe
- Pacific: Daniel Hansen & Meagan Nelson
- Montana State: Daniel Hansen & Meagan Nelson
- UC Santa Barbara: Braden Clark & Trevor Porath
- Utah Valley: Daniel Hansen & Meagan Nelson
- Northern Arizona: Zach Lorhap?
- Weber State: Kylee Young
- Southern Utah: Bryson Lester
- San Diego State: Braden Clark & Trevor Porath
- Fresno State: Daniel Hansen & Meagan Nelson
- UNLV: Wyatt Tomchek & Elli Woinowsky
- New Mexico: Adam Diehl
- Wyoming: Daniel Hansen & Meagan Nelson
- Colorado State: Braden Clark & Trevor Porath
- Boise State: Braden Clark & Jaden Johnson
- Fresno State: Stephen Trembley
- San Diego State: Chris Ello
- New Mexico:
- UNLV:
- Colorado State:
- Wyoming:
- Boise State:
- Air Force:
- Nevada:
- San Jose State:
