= 2017 Southern Utah Thunderbirds volleyball team =

American college volleyball season

2017 Southern Utah Thunderbirds women's volleyball
- Conference: Big Sky Conference
- South
- Record: 5–7 (0–0 Big Sky)
- Head coach: Craig Choate (3rd season)
- Assistant coaches: Annie Stradling Stephens (3rd season); Shane Tye (2nd season)
- Home arena: Centrum Arena

The 2017 Southern Utah Thunderbirds volleyball team represented Southern Utah University in the 2017 NCAA Division I women's volleyball season. The Thunderbirds were led by third year head coach Craig Choate and played their home games at Centrum Arena. The Thunderbirds were members of the Big Sky.

Southern Utah came off a season where they finished 2–14 in conference, 4–24 overall, good for sixth place in the South Division and tied for 11th overall. For 2017 the Thunderbirds were picked to finish sixth in the South, 12th overall, in the pre-season Big Sky poll.

2017 Big Sky Conference volleyball standings
	Conf.				Overall
Team	W		L	PCT	W		L	PCT
North
North Dakota ‍‍‍	4	–	0	1.000	19	–	2	.905
Idaho ‍‍‍	3	–	1	.750	8	–	7	.533
Northern Colorado ‍‍‍	2	–	2	.500	9	–	8	.529
Eastern Washington ‍‍‍	2	–	2	.500	5	–	8	.385
Montana State ‍‍‍	1	–	3	.250	5	–	8	.385
Montana ‍‍‍	0	–	4	.000	5	–	12	.294
South
Sacramento State ‍‍‍	4	–	0	1.000	13	–	7	.650
Portland State ‍‍‍	3	–	1	.750	12	–	4	.750
Northern Arizona ‍‍‍	2	–	2	.500	6	–	10	.375
Weber State ‍‍‍	2	–	2	.500	4	–	12	.250
Idaho State ‍‍‍	1	–	3	.250	4	–	13	.235
Southern Utah ‍‍‍	0	–	4	.000	5	–	11	.313
† – Conference champion: y- Invited to the NCAA volleyball tournament As of 2017-09-30 Rankings from AVCA

== Season highlights ==
Season highlights will be filled in as the season progresses.

== Roster ==
2017 Southern Utah Thunderbirds roster
Defensive Specialist/Libero: 6 Rylee Rogers - Junior; 15 Alarie Anderson - Freshman; Setters: 4 Kacie Huntsman - Freshman; 9 Alexis Averett - Sophomore	Outside hitters: 1 Sarah Vang - Sophomore; 2 McKenzie Van Uitert - Freshman; 3 Macky Fifita - Senior; 5 Janet Kalaniuvalu - Freshman; 11 Elisa Lago - Freshman; 20 Leighanne Taylor - Freshman	Middle blockers: 16 Miranda Canez- Freshman; 19 Anna Cox- Freshman; 23 Macail Evans - Senior

== Schedule ==
Date Time	Opponent	Rank	Arena City (Tournament)	Television	Result	Attendance	Record (Big Sky Record)
8/25; 10 a.m.	vs. Elon		Halton Arena; Charlotte, NC (2017 Charlotte Invitational)		L 3–1 (25–17, 25–23, 23–25, 25–12)	550	0–1
8/25; 5:30 p.m.	@ Charlotte		Halton Arena; Charlotte, NC (2017 Charlotte Invitational)	C-USA DN	L 3–2 (22–25, 22–25, 25–22, 25–21, 15–6)	550	0–2
8/26; 7 a.m.	vs. South Carolina State		Halton Arena; Charlotte, NC (2017 Charlotte Invitational)		W 3–0 (28–26, 25–18, 25–18)	778	1–2
8/26; 1 p.m.	vs. Belmont		Halton Arena; Charlotte, NC (2017 Charlotte Invitational)		L 3–1 (22–25, 26–24, 25–23, 25–20)	778	1–3
8/29; 6 p.m.	Utah Valley		Centrum Arena; Cedar City, UT	Pluto TV Ch. 236	L 3–0 (25–18, 25–15, 25–22)	1,156	1–4
9/01; 1 p.m.	vs. Howard		Titan Gym; Fullerton, CA (Fullerton/Riverside Classic)		W 3–2 (25–15, 26–24, 25–16)	44	2–4
9/02; 2 p.m.	vs. Chicago State		UC Riverside Student Recreation Center; Riverside, CA (Fullerton/Riverside Classic)		L 3–1 (25–23, 25–20, 18–25, 25–22)	N/A	2–5
9/02; 9 p.m.	@ CS Fullerton		Titan Gym; Fullerton, CA (Fullerton/Riverside Classic)		W 3–2 (25–21, 25–23, 24–26, 21–25, 15–11)	239	3–5
9/08; 10 a.m.	vs. Liberty		Clune Arena; Colorado Springs, CO (Amy Svoboda Memorial Classic)		W 3–2 (14–25, 25–19, 28–26, 20–25, 15–12)	66	4–5
9/08; 6 p.m.	@ Air Force		Clune Arena; Colorado Springs, CO (Amy Svoboda Memorial Classic)	MW Net	W 3–2 (23–25, 25–22, 25–12, 25–27, 17–15)	402	5–5
9/09; 2 p.m.	@ Air Force		Clune Arena; Colorado Springs, CO (Amy Svoboda Memorial Classic)	MW Net	L 3–1 (25–12, 25–21 ,21–25, 25–21)	259	5–6
9/15; 7 p.m.	Utah State		Centrum Arena; Cedar City, UT	Pluto TV Ch. 236	L 3–1 (26–24, 25–18, 29–25, 25–17)	1,447	5–7
9/21; 7 p.m.	North Dakota*		Centrum Arena; Cedar City, UT	Pluto TV Ch. 236	L 3–1 (16–25, 25–13, 25–18, 25–18)	1,435	5–8 (0–1)
9/23; 7 p.m.	Northern Arizona*		Centrum Arena; Cedar City, UT	Pluto TV Ch. 236	L 3–0 (25–19, 25–21, 25–21)	987	5–9 (0–2)
9/28; 7 p.m.	@ Weber State*		Swenson Gym; Ogden, UT	Pluto TV Ch. 235	L 3–0 (25–22, 25–14, 25–14)	378	5–10 (0–3)
9/30; 7 p.m.	@ Idaho State*		Holt Arena; Pocatello, ID	Pluto TV Ch. 243	L 3–0 (25–21, 25–17, 25–20)	559	5–11 (0–4)
10/05; 7 p.m.	Idaho*		Centrum Arena; Cedar City, UT	Pluto TV Ch. 236			
10/07; 11:30 a.m.	Eastern Washington*		Centrum Arena; Cedar City, UT	Pluto TV Ch. 236			
10/12; 8 p.m.	@ Sacramento State*		Hornets Nest; Sacramento, CA	Pluto TV Ch. 233			
10/14; 8 p.m.	@ Portland State*		Peter Stott Center; Portland, OR	Pluto TV Ch. 232			
10/19; 7 p.m.	@ Montana*		Dahlberg Arena; Missoula, MT	Pluto TV Ch. 237			
10/21; 7 p.m.	@ Montana State*		Worthington Arena; Bozeman, MT	Pluto TV Ch. 238			
10/26; 7 p.m.	Portland State*		Centrum Arena; Cedar City, UT	Pluto TV Ch. 236			
10/28; 7 p.m.	Sacramento State*		Centrum Arena; Cedar City, UT	Pluto TV Ch. 236			
11/02; 7 p.m.	Idaho State*		Centrum Arena; Cedar City, UT	Pluto TV Ch. 236			
11/04; 7 p.m.	Weber State*		Centrum Arena; Cedar City, UT	Pluto TV Ch. 236			
11/09; 7 p.m.	@ Northern Colorado*		Bank of Colorado Arena; Greeley, CO	Pluto TV Ch. 241			
11/11; 8 p.m.	@ Northern Arizona*		Walkup Skydome; Flagstaff, AZ	Pluto TV Ch. 239			

*-Indicates Conference Opponent
y-Indicates NCAA Playoffs
Times listed are Mountain Time Zone.

== Announcers for televised games ==
All home games will be on the Pluto TV Ch. 236. Select road games will also be televised or streamed.

- Charlotte: Sean Fox
- Utah Valley: Bryson Lester
- Air Force: Jason Carter & George Egan
- Air Force: Jason Carter & George Egan
- Utah State: No commentary
- North Dakota: Bryson Lester
- Northern Arizona: Bryson Lester
- Weber State: Kylee Young
- Idaho State: Cade Vance & Matt Steuart
- Idaho: Bryson Lester
- Eastern Washington: Bryson Lester
- Sacramento State:
- Portland State:
- Montana:
- Montana State:
- Portland State: Bryson Lester
- Sacramento State: Bryson Lester
- Idaho State: Bryson Lester
- Weber State: Bryson Lester
- Northern Colorado:
- Northern Arizona:
