= 2017 Utah Utes volleyball team =

American college volleyball season

2017 Utah Utes women's volleyball
- Conference: Pac-12 Conference
- Record: 17–6 (8–4 Pac-12)
- Head coach: Beth Launiere (28th season)
- Assistant coaches: JJ Van Niel (3rd season); Malia Shoji (3rd season)
- Home arena: Huntsman Center

The 2017 Utah Utes volleyball team represented the University of Utah in the 2017 NCAA Division I women's volleyball season. The Utes were led by twenty-eighth year head coach Beth Launiere and played their home games at the Huntsman Center. The Utes were members of the Pac-12 Conference.

Utah came off a season where they went 20–12, 11–9 in conference. They earned an at-large NCAA Tournament at-large slot where they lost to UNLV in the first round. The Utes entered the season having been picked to finish fourth in the 2017 pre-season Pac-12 poll.

2017 Pac-12 Conference volleyball standings
	Conf.				Overall
Team	W		L	PCT	W		L	PCT
No. 2 Stanford ‍‍‍	12	–	0	1.000	19	–	2	.905
No. 14 Washington ‍‍‍	8	–	4	.667	18	–	5	.783
No. 12 Utah ‍‍‍	8	–	4	.667	17	–	6	.739
No. 19 USC ‍‍‍	8	–	4	.667	16	–	7	.696
Colorado ‍‍‍	7	–	5	.583	17	–	6	.739
No. 15 Oregon ‍‍‍	7	–	5	.583	14	–	6	.700
Oregon State ‍‍‍	6	–	6	.500	16	–	8	.667
No. 13 UCLA ‍‍‍	6	–	6	.500	13	–	8	.619
Cal ‍‍‍	4	–	8	.333	13	–	10	.565
Washington State ‍‍‍	3	–	9	.250	14	–	10	.583
Arizona ‍‍‍	3	–	9	.250	9	–	12	.429
Arizona State ‍‍‍	0	–	12	.000	10	–	14	.417
† – Conference champion: y- Invited to the NCAA volleyball tournament As of 2017-10-30 Rankings from AVCA

== Season highlights ==
Season highlights will be filled in as the season progresses.

== Roster ==
2017 Utah Utes Roster
Defensive Specialist/Libero: 3 Torre Glasker - Sophomore; 9 Kristen Abels - Freshman; 17 Brianna Doehrmann - Sophomore; Setters: 6 Camryn Machado - Freshman; 8 Bailey Choy - Sophomore; 11 Alexa Van Komen - Freshman	Outside Hitters: 1 Dani Barton - Freshman; 2 Shannon Scully - Freshman; 3 Torre Glasker - Sophomore; 4 Kenzie Koerber - Freshman; 5 Lauga Gauta - Junior; 10 Carly Trueman - Senior; 14 Adora Anae - Senior; 18 Lauren Sproule - (redshirt) Freshman	Middle Blockers: 12 Berkeley Oblad - Junior; 19 Phoebe Grace - Freshman; 20 Tawnee Luafalemana - Senior

== Schedule ==
Date Time	Opponent	Rank	Arena City (Tournament)	Television	Result	Attendance	Record (Pac-12 Record)
8/25; 11 a.m.	vs. Cincinnati	#23	Memorial Coliseum; Lexington, KY (Bluegrass Battle)		W 3–0 (25–10, 25–18, 25–17)	1,642	1–0
8/25; 7 p.m.	@ #14 Kentucky	#23	Memorial Coliseum; Lexington, KY (Bluegrass Battle)	SEC	L 3–2 (25–23, 29–27, 13–25, 20–25, 15–12)	1,642	1–1
8/26; 7 p.m.	vs. Arkansas State	#23	Memorial Coliseum; Lexington, KY (Bluegrass Battle)		W 3–0 (26–24, 25–23, 25–20)	1,772	2–1
8/31; 8:45 p.m.	vs. South Dakota	#22	Stan Sheriff Center; Honolulu, HI (Rainbow Wahine Classic)		W 3–0 (25–22, 25–10, 25–15)	250	3–1
9/01; 8:45 p.m.	vs. Western Carolina	#22	Stan Sheriff Center; Honolulu, HI (Rainbow Wahine Classic)		W 3–0 (25–20, 25–18, 25–22)	5,001	4–1
9/03; 8 p.m.	@ Hawai'i	#22	Stan Sheriff Center; Honolulu, HI (Rainbow Wahine Classic)	SPEC HI	W 3–1 (20–25, 26–24, 25–15, 25–23)	6,948	5–1
9/08; 7 p.m.	#15 San Diego	#18	Huntsman Center; Salt Lake City, UT (Utah Volleyball Classic)		W 3–2 (25–22, 17–25, 25–19, 22–25, 16–14)	1,046	6–1
9/09; 7:45 p.m.	Green Bay	#18	Huntsman Center; Salt Lake City, UT (Utah Volleyball Classic)		W 3–0 (25–9, 25–16, 25–15)	333	7–1
9/09; 7 p.m.	Missouri	#18	Huntsman Center; Salt Lake City, UT (Utah Volleyball Classic)		W 3–0 (25–20, 27–25, 25–19)	847	8–1
9/14; 7 p.m.	#14 BYU	#16	Huntsman Center; Salt Lake City, UT (Deseret First Duel)	P12	L 3–2 (16–25, 25–13, 25–17, 20–25, 18–16)	4,637	8–2
9/15; 7 p.m.	@ Utah Valley	#16	Lockhart Arena; Orem, UT	WAC DN	W 3–1 (19–25, 25–18, 25–16, 25–22)	1,081	9–2
9/22; 7 p.m.	#25 Colorado*	#16	Huntsman Center; Salt Lake City, UT	P12	W 3–1 (25–14, 16–25, 25–20, 25–17)	1,480	10–2 (1–0)
9/24; 2 p.m.	Cal*	#16	Huntsman Center; Salt Lake City, UT	P12	W 3–0 (25–19, 25–21, 25–12)	1,218	11–2 (2–0)
9/29; 6 p.m.	#12 Oregon*	#15	Huntsman Center; Salt Lake City, UT	P12	L 3–2 (25–16, 25–13, 16–25, 17–25, 21–19)	1,923	11–3 (2–1)
9/30; 8 p.m.	Oregon State*	#15	Huntsman Center; Salt Lake City, UT	P12	W 3–0 (27–25, 25–16, 25–17)	1,523	12–3 (3–1)
10/6; 9 p.m.	@ #9 Washington*	#17	Alaska Airlines Arena at Hec Edmundson Pavilion; Seattle, WA	P12	W 3–2 (27–25, 26–24, 21–25, 23–25, 16–14)	3,019	13–3 (4–1)
10/08; 12 p.m.	@ Washington State*	#17	Bohler Gym; Pullman, WA	P12	W 3–1 (25–21, 25–19, 21–25, 25–21)	675	14–3 (5–1)
10/13; 7 p.m.	@ Arizona*	#13	McKale Center; Tucson, AZ	P12 AZ DN	W 3–1 (25–18, 25–23, 23–25, 25–23)	1,781	15–3 (6–1)
10/15; 2 p.m.	@ Arizona State*	#13	Wells Fargo Arena; Tempe, AZ	P12	W 3–1 (24–26, 25–17, 31–29, 28–26)	892	16–3 (7–1)
10/20; 6 p.m.	#13 UCLA*	#12	Huntsman Center; Salt Lake City, UT	P12	W 3–1 (25–20, 22–25, 25–21, 25–19)	3,179	17–3 (8–1)
10/22; 1 p.m.	#19 USC*	#12	Huntsman Center; Salt Lake City, UT	P12	L 3–2 (25–21, 26–28, 25–20, 21–25, 15–9)	2,004	17–4 (8–2)
10/25; 8 p.m.	@ #15 Oregon*	#12	Matthew Knight Arena; Eugene, OR	P12	L 3–1 (25–18, 21–25, 25–23, 25–22)	1,250	17–5 (8–3)
10/27; 7 p.m.	@ Oregon State*	#12	Gill Coliseum; Corvallis, OR	P12 OSU DN	L 3–1 (16–25, 25–16, 25–20, 25–20)	1,142	17–6 (8–4)
11/02; 7 p.m.	Washington State*		Huntsman Center; Salt Lake City, UT	P12 UTAH DN			
11/04; 7 p.m.	Washington*		Huntsman Center; Salt Lake City, UT	P12 UTAH DN			
11/09; 7 p.m.	@ USC*		Galen Center; Los Angeles, CA	P12			
11/10; 9 p.m.	@ UCLA*		John Wooden Center; Los Angeles, CA	P12 UCLA DN			
11/17; TBA	Arizona State*		Huntsman Center; Salt Lake City, UT	P12 UTAH DN			
11/18; 7 p.m.	Arizona*		Huntsman Center; Salt Lake City, UT	P12 UTAH DN			
11/22; TBD	@ Stanford*		Maples Pavilion; Stanford, CA	P12			
11/24; 8 p.m.	@ Colorado*		Coors Events Center; Boulder, CO	P12			

*-Indicates Conference Opponent
y-Indicates NCAA Playoffs
Times listed are Mountain Time Zone.

== Announcers for televised games ==
All home conference games will be on Pac-12 Networks or P12 Digital Network. All Pac-12 Network games will be on the National Feed and Mountain Feed unless noted otherwise. Select road games will also be televised or streamed.

- Kentucky: Courtney Lyle & Jenny Hazelwood
- Hawai'i: Kanoa Leahey, Chris McLaughlin, & Ryan Kalei Tsuji
- BYU: Thad Anderson & Amy Gant
- Utah Valley: Matthew Baiamonte & Kyle Bruderer
- Colorado: Thad Anderson & Amy Gant
- Cal: Thad Anderson
- Oregon: Thad Anderson & Amy Gant
- Oregon State: Thad Anderson
- Washington: Elise Woodward & Amy Gant
- Washington State: Anne Marie Anderson
- Arizona: No commentary
- Arizona State: Kate Scott & Dain Blanton
- UCLA: Thad Anderson & Mike Dodd
- USC: Thad Anderson & Holly McPeak
- Oregon: Rich Burk & Amy Gant
- Oregon State: No commentary
- Washington State:
- Washington:
- USC:
- UCLA:
- Arizona State:
- Arizona:
- Stanford:
- Colorado:
