= 2017 BYU Cougars women's volleyball team =

Women's volleyball team

2017 BYU Cougars women's volleyball

2017 BYU Invitational Champions 2017 Boise State Classic Champions

NCAA, Regional semifinals
- Conference: West Coast Conference
- Record: 30–3 (17–1 WCC)
- Head coach: Heather Olmstead (3rd season)
- Assistant coaches: David Hyte (4th season); Jonny Neeley (2nd season)
- Home arena: Smith Fieldhouse

2017 West Coast Conference volleyball standings
	Conf.				Overall
Team	W		L	PCT	W		L	PCT
No. 8 BYU ‍‍‍	10	–	1	.909	21	–	2	.913
No. 18 San Diego ‍‍‍	10	–	1	.909	17	–	4	.810
Gonzaga ‍‍‍	8	–	3	.727	13	–	10	.565
Pacific ‍‍‍	7	–	5	.583	12	–	11	.522
Portland ‍‍‍	5	–	6	.455	14	–	9	.609
Loyola Marymount ‍‍‍	5	–	7	.417	12	–	11	.522
Pepperdine ‍‍‍	5	–	7	.417	13	–	12	.520
Santa Clara ‍‍‍	5	–	7	.417	12	–	12	.500
Saint Mary's ‍‍‍	3	–	9	.250	7	–	15	.318
San Francisco ‍‍‍	0	–	12	.000	3	–	22	.120
† – Conference champion y- Invited to the NCAA volleyball tournament As of 2017-10-29; Rankings from AVCA

The 2017 BYU Cougars women's volleyball team represented Brigham Young University in the 2017 NCAA Division I women's volleyball season. The Cougars were led by third year head coach Heather Olmstead and played their home games at the Smith Fieldhouse. The Cougars were members of the WCC.

BYU came off a season where they won the WCC regular season championship and once again participated in the NCAA tournament before falling to Texas in the third round.

== Season highlights ==
Season highlights will be filled in as the season progresses.

== Roster ==
2017 BYU Cougars Roster
Defensive Specialist/Libero: 9 Sydnie Martindale - Junior; 17 Tristyn Moser - Sophomore; 18 Mary Lake - Sophomore; Opposite hitters: 2 Cosy Burnett - (redshirt) Senior; 5 Emily Lewis - (redshirt) Sophomore; 16 Allison Stapleton - Freshman; 22 Sara Hamson - Freshman	Outside hitters: 1 Taylen Ballard - Freshman; 11 Lacy Haddock - Junior; 12 Roni Jones-Perry - Junior; 13 Danelle Parady - (redshirt) Junior; 14 McKenna Miller - Sophomore; 16 Allison Stapleton - Freshman	Setters: 3 Alohi Robins-Hardy - Senior; 6 Lyndie Haddock - Junior; 15 Kiani Tuileta - (redshirt) Sophomore; Middle blockers: 4 Madeline Graham - Senior; 21 Megan Mowry - Sophomore; 24 Kennedy Redding - (redshirt) Freshman

== Schedule ==
Date Time	Opponent	Rank	Arena City (Tournament)	Television	Result	Attendance	Record (WCC Record)
8/25; 12 p.m.	St. Louis	#10	Smith Fieldhouse; Provo, UT (BYU Invitational)	TheW.tv	W 3–0 (25–12, 26–24, 25–20)	1,207	1–0
8/25; 7:30 p.m.	UTRGV	#10	Smith Fieldhouse; Provo, UT (BYU Invitational)	TheW.tv	W 3–0 (25–17, 25–17, 25–16)	1,207	2–0
8/26; 7 p.m.	#21 Ohio State	#10	Smith Fieldhouse; Provo, UT (BYU Invitational)	BYUtv	W 3–1 (19–25, 25–17, 25–18, 25–17)	2,706	3–0
8/31; 7:30 p.m.	@ Boise State	#10	Bronco Gym; Boise, ID (Boise State Classic)	Flo Volleyball	W 3–0 (25–19, 26–24, 26–24)	1,009	4–0
9/01; 5:30 p.m.	vs. Missouri	#10	Bronco Gym; Boise, ID (Boise State Classic)	Flo Volleyball	W 3–1 (25–13, 21–25, 25–21, 25–16)	867	5–0
9/02; 12 p.m.	vs. Sacramento State	#10	Bronco Gym; Boise, ID (Boise State Classic)	Flo Volleyball	W 3–0 (25–8, 25–10, 25–14)	123	6–0
9/07; 10 p.m.	@ Hawai'i	#10	Stan Sheriff Center; Honolulu, HI (Outrigger Resorts Volleyball Challenge)	SPEC HI	W 3–2 (25–18, 25–12, 16–25, 15–25, 15–7)	5,912	7–0
9/08; 8:45 p.m.	vs. Nevada	#10	Stan Sheriff Center; Honolulu, HI (Outrigger Resorts Volleyball Challenge)		W 3–0 (25–18, 25–22, 25–18)	5,908	8–0
9/09; 7 p.m.	vs. Baylor	#10	Stan Sheriff Center; Honolulu, HI (Outrigger Resorts Volleyball Challenge)		L 3–2 (21–25, 22–25, 25–18, 28–26, 15–10)	6,448	8–1
9/14; 7 p.m.	@ #16 Utah	#14	Huntsman Center; Salt Lake City, UT (Deseret First Duel)	P12	W 3–2 (16–25, 25–13, 25–17, 20–25, 18–16)	4,637	9–1
9/15; 7 p.m.	Weber State	#14	Smith Fieldhouse; Provo, UT	BYUtv	W 3–0 (25–20, 25–15, 25–22)	4,110	10–1
9/16; 7 p.m.	@ Utah Valley	#14	Lockhart Arena; Orem, UT (UCCU Crosstown Clash)	UVUtv; WAC DN	W 3–1 (25–21, 22–25, 26–24, 25–17)	1,726	11–1
9/21; 8 p.m.	@ Santa Clara*	#9	Leavey Center; Santa Clara, CA	TheW.tv	W 3–0 (25–22, 25–17, 25–15)	342	12–1 (1–0)
9/23; 2 p.m.	@ San Francisco*	#9	The Sobrato Center; San Francisco, CA	TheW.tv	W 3–0 (25–18, 25–22, 25–8)	175	13–1 (2–0)
9/26; 7 p.m.	Pepperdine*	#9	Smith Fieldhouse; Provo, UT	BYUtv	W 3–1 (25–17, 18–25, 25–21, 25–21)	2,143	14–1 (3–0)
9/30; 1 p.m.	@ #17 San Diego*	#9	Jenny Craig Pavilion; San Diego, CA	TheW.tv	W 3–1 (25–23, 23–25, 25–20, 25–18)	1,014	15–1 (4–0)
10/05; 8 p.m.	@ Saint Mary's*	#8	McKeon Pavilion; Moraga, CA	TheW.tv	W 3–2 (22–25, 20–25, 25–20, 25–23, 15–13)	170	16–1 (5–0)
10/07; 1 p.m.	@ Pacific*	#8	Alex G. Spanos Center; Stockton, CA	TheW.tv	W 3–0 (25–19, 25–20, 25–16)	839	17–1 (6–0)
10/12; 7 p.m.	Portland*	#8	Smith Fieldhouse; Provo, UT	BYUtv	W 3–0 (25–15, 25–10, 25–14)	2,192	18–1 (7–0)
10/14; 1 p.m.	Gonzaga*	#8	Smith Fieldhouse; Provo, UT	TheW.tv	W 3–0 (25–11, 26–24, 25–16)	2,438	19–1 (8–0)
10/19; 8 p.m.	@ Pepperdine*	#8	Firestone Fieldhouse; Malibu, CA	TheW.tv	W 3–0 (25–20, 25–21, 25–15)	253	20–1 (9–0)
10/21; 1 p.m.	@ Loyola Marymount*	#8	Gersten Pavilion; Los Angeles, CA	TheW.tv	W 3–2 (21–25, 22–25, 25–18, 25–12, 15–11)	430	21–1 (10–0)
10/27; 7 p.m.	#18 San Diego*	#8	Smith Fieldhouse; Provo, UT	BYUtv	L 3–1 (25–21, 23–25, 25–22, 25–16)	3,355	21–2 (10–1)
11/02; 7 p.m.	Pacific*	#10	Smith Fieldhouse; Provo, UT	BYUtv	W 3–0 (25–21, 25–17, 25–17)	1,439	22–2 (11–1)
11/04; 1 p.m.	Saint Mary's*	#10	Smith Fieldhouse; Provo, UT	BYUtv	W 3–1 (25–15, 25–18, 23–25, 25–18)	1,306	23–2 (12–1)
11/09; 7 p.m.	@ Gonzaga*	#9	McCarthey Athletic Center; Spokane, WA	TheW.tv	W 3–0 (25–15, 25–13, 25–21)	943	24–2 (13–1)
11/11; 1 p.m.	@ Portland*	#9	Chiles Center; Portland, OR	TheW.tv	W 3–0 (25–13, 25–20, 25–20)	886	25–2 (14–1)
11/16; 7 p.m.	San Francisco*	#9	Smith Fieldhouse; Provo, UT	BYUtv	W 3–0 (25–12, 25–17, 25–12)	1,486	26–2 (15–1)
11/18; 1 p.m.	Santa Clara*	#9	Smith Fieldhouse; Provo, UT	TheW.tv	W 3–0 (25–16, 25–22, 25–19)	1,157	27-2 (16-1)
11/21; 7 p.m.	Loyola Marymount*	#7	Smith Fieldhouse; Provo, UT	TheW.tv	W 3–0 (25–19, 25–20, 25–16)	2,705	28-2 (17-1)
12/1; 7 p.m.	y- American		Smith Fieldhouse; Provo, UT	BYUtv; ESPN3	W 3–0 (25–11, 25–17, 25–16)	2,942	29-2 (17-1)
12/2; 7 p.m.	y- Oregon		Smith Fieldhouse; Provo, UT	BYUtv; ESPN3	W 3–0 (25–20, 25–21, 25–19)	2,935	30-2 (17-1)
12/8; 10 a.m.	y- @ Kentucky		Memorial Coliseum; Lexington, KY	ESPNU	L 3–2 (20–25, 25–17, 22–25, 25–18, 15–9)	3,219	30-3 (17-1)

*-Indicates Conference Opponent
y-Indicates NCAA Playoffs
Times listed are Mountain Time Zone.

== Announcers for televised games ==
All home games will be on BYUtv or TheW.tv powered by Stadium. Select road games will also be televised or streamed.

- St. Louis: Mitchell Marshall
- UTRGV: Mitchell Marshall & Hannah Robison
- Ohio State: Spencer Linton, Kristen Kozlowski, & Jason Shepherd
- Boise State: Don Marchand
- Missouri: Don Marchand
- Sacramento State: Don Marchand
- Hawai'i: Kanoa Leahey, Chris McLaughlin, & Scott Robbs
- Utah: Thad Anderson & Amy Gant (P12); Mitchell Marshall (BYU Radio)
- Weber State: Spencer Linton & Amy Gant
- Utah Valley: Matthew Baiamonte & Kyle Bruderer
- Santa Clara: Anthony Passarelli
- San Francisco: Pat Olson
- Pepperdine: Spencer Linton, Steve Vail, & Jason Shepherd
- San Diego: Darren Preston
- Saint Mary's: Alex Jensen
- Pacific: Paul Muyskens
- Portland: Spencer Linton, Kristen Kozlowski, & Jason Shepherd
- Gonzaga: Robbie Bullough
- Pepperdine: Al Epstein
- Loyola Marymount: Dalton Green
- San Diego: Spencer Linton, Kristen Kozlowski, & Jason Shepherd
- Pacific: Spencer Linton, Kristen Kozlowski, & Jason Shepherd
- Saint Mary's: Spencer Linton, Kristen Kozlowski, & Jason Shepherd
- Gonzaga: No commentary
- Portland: No commentary
- San Francisco: Spencer Linton, Kristen Kozlowski, & Jason Shepherd
- Santa Clara: Robbie Bullough & Amy Boswell Usevitch
- Loyola Marymount: Robbie Bullough
- American: Spencer Linton, Kristen Kozlowski, & Jason Shepherd
- Oregon State: Spencer Linton, Kristen Kozlowski, & Jason Shepherd
- Kentucky:Tiffany Greene & Missy Whittimore
