= 2017 NCAA Division I women's volleyball tournament =

Volleyball competition

2017 NCAA women's Division I volleyball tournament
- 2017 Division I Championship
- Finals site: Sprint Center; Kansas City, Missouri
- Champions: Nebraska (5th title)
- Runner-up: Florida (2nd title match)
- Semifinalists: Penn State (13th Final Four); Stanford (21st Final Four)
- Winning coach: John Cook (4th title)
- Most outstanding player: Mikaela Foecke (2nd) (Nebraska); Kelly Hunter (Nebraska)
- Final Four All-Tournament Team: Rhamat Alhassan (Florida); Simone Lee (Penn State); Merete Lutz (Stanford); Kenzie Maloney (Nebraska); Carli Snyder (Florida)

The 2017 NCAA Division I women's volleyball tournament began November 30, 2017 and concluded on December 16 at the Sprint Center in Kansas City, Missouri. The tournament field was determined on November 26, 2017. Nebraska beat Florida in the final to claim their fifth national championship.

== Qualifying teams ==
University Park Regional
Seed	RPI	School	Conference	Berth Type	Record
1	1	Penn State	Big Ten	At-Large/Split	29–1
8	8	Washington	Pac-12	At-Large	24–7
9	10	Creighton	Big East	Automatic	25–6
16	14	Wichita State	The American	Automatic	28–3
	35	VCU	A-10	Automatic	30–2
	36	Missouri State	MVC	Automatic	28–5
	60	Radford	Big South	Automatic	25–4
	74	Coastal Carolina	Sun Belt	Automatic	20–7
	111	LIU Brooklyn	NEC	Automatic	20–9
	239	Howard	MEAC	Automatic	16–15
	19	Kansas	Big 12	At-Large	22–7
	23	Michigan State	Big Ten	At-Large	21–8
	26	Illinois	Big Ten	At-Large	21–10
	27	Pittsburgh	ACC	At-Large/Split	25–6
	34	Missouri	SEC	At-Large	20–11
	37	Hawaii	Big West	At-Large	20–7

Stanford Regional
Seed	RPI	School	Conference	Berth Type	Record
3	5	Stanford	Pac-12	Automatic	26–3
6	4	Texas	Big 12	Automatic	24–2
11	9	Utah	Pac-12	At-Large	22–9
14	13	Iowa State	Big 12	At-Large	21–6
	32	Colorado State	Mountain West	Automatic	28–3
	61	Princeton	Ivy League	Automatic	18–7
	67	Cleveland State	Horizon	Automatic	22–7
	147	Fairfield	MAAC	Automatic	25–6
	184	CSU Bakersfield	WAC	Automatic	19–13
	18	Wisconsin	Big Ten	At-Large	20–9
	25	Purdue	Big Ten	At-Large	22–9
	29	Michigan	Big Ten	At-Large	21–11
	30	Marquette	Big East	At-Large	22–9
	31	Oregon State	Pac-12	At-Large	21–11
	39	High Point	Big South	At-Large	24–7
	49	NC State	ACC	At-Large	20–11

Gainesville Regional
Seed	RPI	School	Conference	Berth Type	Record
2	2	Florida	SEC	Automatic/Split	25–1
7	7	Minnesota	Big Ten	At-Large	26–5
10	11	USC	Pac-12	At-Large	22–9
15	17	UCLA	Pac-12	At-Large	19–10
	16	Cal Poly	Big West	Automatic	26–2
	20	San Diego	WCC	Automatic/Split	24–4
	21	Louisville	ACC	Automatic/Split	24–6
	54	Denver	The Summit	Automatic	23–5
	58	Austin Peay	Ohio Valley	Automatic	30–5
	66	Central Arkansas	Southland	Automatic	27–4
	70	North Dakota	Big Sky	Automatic	30–7
	196	Alabama State	SWAC	Automatic	28–10
	33	Miami(FL)	ACC	At-Large	21–5
	42	Northern Iowa	MVC	At-Large	26–8
	45	Louisiana State	SEC	At-Large	20–9
	46	Charleston	CAA	At-Large	27–5

Lexington Regional
Seed	RPI	School	Conference	Berth Type	Record
4	3	Kentucky	SEC	At-Large/Split	26–3
5	6	Nebraska	Big Ten	Automatic/Split	26–4
12	12	Baylor	Big 12	At-Large	23–6
13	15	BYU	WCC	At-Large/Split	28–2
	28	Western Kentucky	C-USA	Automatic	30–3
	40	Kennesaw State	ASUN	Automatic	21–4
	48	James Madison	CAA	Automatic	23–5
	62	American	Patriot	Automatic	26–7
	63	Miami(OH)	MAC	Automatic	23–8
	85	ETSU	SoCon	Automatic	19–11
	166	Stony Brook	America East	Automatic	18–12
	22	Oregon	Pac-12	At-Large	17–11
	24	Colorado	Pac-12	At-Large	22–9
	38	Washington State	Pac-12	At-Large	17–15
	40	Notre Dame	ACC	At-Large	22–9
	43	Florida State	ACC	At-Large	18–10

== Bracket ==
=== Penn State Regional ===
First round
1	Penn St.	3
Howard	1
University Park, PA
VCU	1
Pittsburgh	3
Kansas	2
Missouri	3
Wichita, KS
Radford	0
16	Wichita State	3
9	Creighton	3
Coastal Carolina	1
Omaha, NE
Missouri State	0
Michigan State	3
Illinois	3
Hawaii	2
Seattle, WA
LIU Brooklyn	0
8	Washington	3

Second round
1	Penn State	3
Pittsburgh	1
Missouri	3
16	Wichita State	1
9	Creighton	1
Michigan State	3
Illinois	3
8	Washington	2

Regional semifinals
1	Penn State	3
Missouri	0
Michigan State	3
Illinois	1

Regional finals
1	Penn State	3
Michigan State	0

=== Schedule ===
==== First round ====
December 1, 2017; 5:00 PM	VCU	1–3	Pittsburgh	Rec Hall, University Park, Pennsylvania; Attendance: 3,210
December 1, 2017; 5:00 PM	(14–25, 20–25, 25–18, 13–25)			Rec Hall, University Park, Pennsylvania; Attendance: 3,210

December 1, 2017; 7:30 PM	Penn State	3–1	Howard	Rec Hall, University Park, Pennsylvania; Attendance: 3,210
December 1, 2017; 7:30 PM	(25–10, 22–25, 25–15, 25–16)			Rec Hall, University Park, Pennsylvania; Attendance: 3,210

December 1, 2017; 7:00 PM	Kansas	2–3	Missouri	Charles Koch Arena, Wichita, Kansas; Attendance: 7,257
December 1, 2017; 7:00 PM	(23–25, 25–15, 15–25, 25–20, 10–15)			Charles Koch Arena, Wichita, Kansas; Attendance: 7,257

December 1, 2017; 9:00 PM	Radford	0–3	Wichita State	Charles Koch Arena, Wichita, Kansas; Attendance: 7,257
December 1, 2017; 9:00 PM	(16–25, 18–25, 15–25)			Charles Koch Arena, Wichita, Kansas; Attendance: 7,257

December 1, 2017; 5:00 PM	Missouri State	0–3	Michigan State	D. J. Sokol Arena, Omaha, Nebraska; Attendance: 2,517
December 1, 2017; 5:00 PM	(19–25, 11–25, 15–25)			D. J. Sokol Arena, Omaha, Nebraska; Attendance: 2,517

December 1, 2017; 8:00 PM	Creighton	3–1	Coastal Carolina	D. J. Sokol Arena, Omaha, Nebraska; Attendance: 2,517
December 1, 2017; 8:00 PM	(25–20, 27–25, 20–25, 25–22)			D. J. Sokol Arena, Omaha, Nebraska; Attendance: 2,517

December 1, 2017; 8:00 PM	Illinois	3–2	Hawaii	Alaska Airlines Arena, Seattle, Washington; Attendance: 2,814
December 1, 2017; 8:00 PM	(25–18, 25–17, 13–25, 24–26, 15–10)			Alaska Airlines Arena, Seattle, Washington; Attendance: 2,814

December 1, 2017; 10:30 PM	LIU Brooklyn	0–3	Washington	Alaska Airlines Arena, Seattle, Washington; Attendance: 2,814
December 1, 2017; 10:30 PM	(10–25, 13–25, 18–25)			Alaska Airlines Arena, Seattle, Washington; Attendance: 2,814

==== Second round ====
December 2, 2017; 7:00 PM	Penn State	3–1	Pittsburgh	Rec Hall, University Park, Pennsylvania; Attendance: 3,413
December 2, 2017; 7:00 PM	(25–20, 23–25, 25–22, 25–19)			Rec Hall, University Park, Pennsylvania; Attendance: 3,413

December 2, 2017; 8:00 PM	Missouri	3–1	Wichita State	Charles Koch Arena, Wichita, Kansas; Attendance: 7,258
December 2, 2017; 8:00 PM	(25–23, 25–22, 21–25, 26–24)			Charles Koch Arena, Wichita, Kansas; Attendance: 7,258

December 2, 2017; 7:00 PM	Creighton	1–3	Michigan State	D. J. Sokol Arena, Omaha, Nebraska; Attendance: 2,415
December 2, 2017; 7:00 PM	(23–25, 25–19, 20–25, 16–25)			D. J. Sokol Arena, Omaha, Nebraska; Attendance: 2,415

December 2, 2017; 10:00 PM	Illinois	3–2	Washington	Alaska Airlines Arena, Seattle, Washington; Attendance: 3,048
December 2, 2017; 10:00 PM	(25–22, 17–25, 20–25, 25–17, 15–9)			Alaska Airlines Arena, Seattle, Washington; Attendance: 3,048

==== Regional semifinals ====
December 8, 2017; 2:00 PM	Missouri	0–3	Penn State	Rec Hall, University Park, Pennsylvania; Attendance: 3,033
December 8, 2017; 2:00 PM	(17–25, 18–25, 19–25)			Rec Hall, University Park, Pennsylvania; Attendance: 3,033

December 8, 2017; 4:00 PM	Illinois	1–3	Michigan State	Rec Hall, University Park, Pennsylvania; Attendance: 3,033
December 8, 2017; 4:00 PM	(23–25, 25–18, 17–25, 27–29)			Rec Hall, University Park, Pennsylvania; Attendance: 3,033

==== Regional Final ====
December 9, 2017; 8:00 PM	Michigan State	0–3	Penn State	Rec Hall, University Park, Pennsylvania; Attendance: 3,521
December 9, 2017; 8:00 PM	(23–25, 17–25, 26–28)			Rec Hall, University Park, Pennsylvania; Attendance: 3,521

=== Kentucky Regional ===
First round
5	Nebraska	3
Stony Brook	0
Lincoln, NE
Florida State	1
Washington St.	3
Colorado	3
James Madison	0
Waco, TX
Miami (Ohio)	0
12	Baylor	3
13	BYU	3
American	0
Provo, UT
Kennesaw State	0
Oregon	3
Western Kentucky	3
Notre Dame	0
Lexington, KY
ETSU	0
4	Kentucky	3

Second round
5	Nebraska	3
Washington St.	0
Colorado	3
12	Baylor	0
13	BYU	3
Oregon	0
Western Kentucky	2
4	Kentucky	3

Regional semifinals
5	Nebraska	3
Colorado	0
13	BYU	2
4	Kentucky	3

Regional finals
5	Nebraska	3
4	Kentucky	1

=== Schedule ===
==== First round ====
December 1, 2017; 8:00 PM	Nebraska	3–0	Stony Brook	Bob Devaney Sports Center, Lincoln, Nebraska; Attendance: 8,213
December 1, 2017; 8:00 PM	(25–10, 25–14, 25–12)			Bob Devaney Sports Center, Lincoln, Nebraska; Attendance: 8,213

December 1, 2017; 5:30 PM	Florida State	1–3	Washington State	Bob Devaney Sports Center, Lincoln, Nebraska
December 1, 2017; 5:30 PM	(32–34, 14–25, 25–23, 13–25)			Bob Devaney Sports Center, Lincoln, Nebraska

December 1, 2017; 5:30 PM	Colorado	3–0	James Madison	Ferrell Center, Waco, Texas
December 1, 2017; 5:30 PM	(25–21, 25–14, 25–12)			Ferrell Center, Waco, Texas

December 1, 2017; 8:00 PM	Miami (OH)	0–3	Baylor	Ferrell Center, Waco, Texas; Attendance: 1,610
December 1, 2017; 8:00 PM	(19–25, 16–25, 21–25)			Ferrell Center, Waco, Texas; Attendance: 1,610

December 1, 2017; 9:00 PM	BYU	3–0	American	Smith Fieldhouse, Provo, Utah; Attendance: 2,942
December 1, 2017; 9:00 PM	(25–11, 25–17, 25–16)			Smith Fieldhouse, Provo, Utah; Attendance: 2,942

December 1, 2017; 6:00 PM	Kennesaw State	0–3	Oregon	Smith Fieldhouse, Provo, Utah
December 1, 2017; 6:00 PM	(26–28, 19–25, 18–25)			Smith Fieldhouse, Provo, Utah

December 1, 2017; 5:00 PM	Western Kentucky	3–0	Notre Dame	Memorial Coliseum, Lexington, Kentucky
December 1, 2017; 5:00 PM	(25–16, 25–18, 25–22)			Memorial Coliseum, Lexington, Kentucky

December 1, 2017; 7:30 PM	ETSU	0–3	Kentucky	Memorial Coliseum, Lexington, Kentucky; Attendance: 4,005
December 1, 2017; 7:30 PM	(19–25, 20–25, 21–25)			Memorial Coliseum, Lexington, Kentucky; Attendance: 4,005

==== Second round ====
December 2, 2017; 8:00 PM	Nebraska	3–0	Washington State	Bob Devaney Sports Center, Lincoln, Nebraska; Attendance: 8,314
December 2, 2017; 8:00 PM	(25–13, 25–13, 25–18)			Bob Devaney Sports Center, Lincoln, Nebraska; Attendance: 8,314

December 2, 2017; 9:00 PM	Colorado	3–0	Baylor	Ferrell Center, Waco, Texas; Attendance: 1,392
December 2, 2017; 9:00 PM	(25–12, 25–22, 25–20)			Ferrell Center, Waco, Texas; Attendance: 1,392

December 2, 2017; 9:00 PM	BYU	3–0	Oregon	Smith Fieldhouse, Provo, Utah; Attendance: 2,935
December 2, 2017; 9:00 PM	(25–20, 25–21, 25–19)			Smith Fieldhouse, Provo, Utah; Attendance: 2,935

December 2, 2017; 7:00 PM	Western Kentucky	2–3	Kentucky	Memorial Coliseum, Lexington, Kentucky; Attendance: 3,620
December 2, 2017; 7:00 PM	(25–16, 25–22, 19–25, 21–25, 12–15)			Memorial Coliseum, Lexington, Kentucky; Attendance: 3,620

==== Regional semifinals ====
December 8, 2017; 12:00 PM	BYU	2–3	Kentucky	Memorial Coliseum, Lexington, Kentucky; Attendance: 3,219
December 8, 2017; 12:00 PM	(25–20, 17–25, 25–22, 18–25, 9–15)			Memorial Coliseum, Lexington, Kentucky; Attendance: 3,219

December 8, 2017; 2:00 PM	Colorado	0–3	Nebraska	Memorial Coliseum, Lexington, Kentucky; Attendance: 3,179
December 8, 2017; 2:00 PM	(19–25, 11–25, 21–25)			Memorial Coliseum, Lexington, Kentucky; Attendance: 3,179

==== Regional Final ====
December 9, 2017; 4:00 PM	Nebraska	3–1	Kentucky	Memorial Coliseum, Lexington, Kentucky; Attendance: 4,464
December 9, 2017; 4:00 PM	(25–19, 25–22, 25–27, 25–22)			Memorial Coliseum, Lexington, Kentucky; Attendance: 4,464

=== Stanford Regional ===
First round
3	Stanford	3
Cal State Bakersfield	0
Palo Alto, CA
Colorado State	3
Michigan	1
Wisconsin	3
Marquette	0
Ames, IA
Princeton	0
14	Iowa State	3
11	Utah	3
Cleveland State	0
Salt Lake City, UT
High Point	1
Purdue	3
Oregon State	2
NC State	3
Austin, TX
Fairfield	0
6	Texas	3

Second round
3	Stanford	3
Colorado State	0
Wisconsin	3
14	Iowa State	0
11	Utah	3
Purdue	1
NC State	0
6	Texas	3

Regional semifinals
3	Stanford	3
Wisconsin	1
11	Utah	2
6	Texas	3

Regional finals
3	Stanford	3
6	Texas	0

=== Schedule ===
==== First round ====
December 1, 2017; 7:30 PM	Colorado State	3–1	Michigan	Maples Pavilion, Palo Alto, California
December 1, 2017; 7:30 PM	(25–23, 23–25, 25–22, 26–24)			Maples Pavilion, Palo Alto, California

December 1, 2017; 10:00 PM	Stanford	3–0	Cal State Bakersfield	Maples Pavilion, Palo Alto, California; Attendance: 1,468
December 1, 2017; 10:00 PM	(25–11, 25–15, 25–17)			Maples Pavilion, Palo Alto, California; Attendance: 1,468

December 1, 2017; 5:00 PM	Wisconsin	3–0	Marquette	Hilton Coliseum, Ames, Iowa
December 1, 2017; 5:00 PM	(27–25, 25–21, 25–11)			Hilton Coliseum, Ames, Iowa

December 1, 2017; 8:00 PM	Princeton	0–3	Iowa State	Hilton Coliseum, Ames, Iowa; Attendance: 3,033
December 1, 2017; 8:00 PM	(21–25, 17–25, 14–25)			Hilton Coliseum, Ames, Iowa; Attendance: 3,033

November 30, 2017; 6:30 PM	High Point	1–3	Purdue	Jon M. Huntsman Center, Salt Lake City, Utah; Attendance: 1,792
November 30, 2017; 6:30 PM	(25–21, 14–25, 22–25, 12–25)			Jon M. Huntsman Center, Salt Lake City, Utah; Attendance: 1,792

November 30, 2017; 9:00 PM	Utah	3–0	Cleveland State	Jon M. Huntsman Center, Salt Lake City, Utah; Attendance: 1,792
November 30, 2017; 9:00 PM	(25–14, 25–21, 25–12)			Jon M. Huntsman Center, Salt Lake City, Utah; Attendance: 1,792

December 1, 2017; 5:30 PM	Oregon State	2–3	NC State	Gregory Gymnasium, Austin, Texas
December 1, 2017; 5:30 PM	(18–25, 25–19, 21–25, 25–21, 13–15)			Gregory Gymnasium, Austin, Texas

December 1, 2017; 8:00 PM	Fairfield	0–3	Texas	Gregory Gymnasium, Austin, Texas; Attendance: 3,817
December 1, 2017; 8:00 PM	(16–25, 18–25, 17–25)			Gregory Gymnasium, Austin, Texas; Attendance: 3,817

==== Second round ====
December 2, 2017; 9:00 PM	Stanford	3–0	Colorado State	Maples Pavilion, Palo Alto, California; Attendance: 1,726
December 2, 2017; 9:00 PM	(25–14, 25–15, 25–9)			Maples Pavilion, Palo Alto, California; Attendance: 1,726

December 2, 2017; 7:30 PM	Wisconsin	3–0	Iowa State	Hilton Coliseum, Ames, Iowa; Attendance: 3,470
December 2, 2017; 7:30 PM	(25–22, 25–20, 25–23)			Hilton Coliseum, Ames, Iowa; Attendance: 3,470

December 1, 2017; 9:00 PM	Utah	3–1	Purdue	Jon M. Huntsman Center, Salt Lake City, Utah; Attendance: 2,077
December 1, 2017; 9:00 PM	(25–23, 25–19, 13–25, 27–25)			Jon M. Huntsman Center, Salt Lake City, Utah; Attendance: 2,077

December 2, 2017; 8:00 PM	NC State	0–3	Texas	Gregory Gymnasium, Austin, Texas; Attendance: 3,902
December 2, 2017; 8:00 PM	(18–25, 15–25, 21–25)			Gregory Gymnasium, Austin, Texas; Attendance: 3,902

==== Regional semifinals ====
December 8, 2017; 9:00 PM	Utah	2–3	Texas	Maples Pavilion, Palo Alto, California; Attendance: 2,418
December 8, 2017; 9:00 PM	(19–25, 25–16, 26–24, 21–25, 14–16)			Maples Pavilion, Palo Alto, California; Attendance: 2,418

December 8, 2017; 11:00 PM	Wisconsin	1–3	Stanford	Maples Pavilion, Palo Alto, California; Attendance: 2,510
December 8, 2017; 11:00 PM	(25–22, 20–25, 21–25, 19–25)			Maples Pavilion, Palo Alto, California; Attendance: 2,510

==== Regional Final ====
December 9, 2017; 10:00 PM	Texas	0–3	Stanford	Maples Pavilion, Palo Alto, California; Attendance: 2,933
December 9, 2017; 10:00 PM	(21–25, 21–25, 21–25)			Maples Pavilion, Palo Alto, California; Attendance: 2,933

=== Florida Regional ===
First round
7	Minnesota	3
North Dakota	0
Minneapolis, MN
Northern Iowa	3
Louisville	0
San Diego	3
LSU	1
Los Angeles, CA
Central Arkansas	1
10	USC	3
15	UCLA	3
Austin Peay	0
Los Angeles, CA
Denver	0
Cal Poly	3
Miami (FL)	3
Charleston	1
Gainesville, FL
Alabama State	0
2	Florida	3

Second round
7	Minnesota	3
Northern Iowa	1
San Diego	2
10	USC	3
15	UCLA	3
Cal Poly	1
Miami (FL)	1
2	Florida	3

Regional semifinals
7	Minnesota	0
10	USC	3
15	UCLA	1
2	Florida	3

Regional finals
10	USC	2
2	Florida	3

=== Schedule ===
==== First round ====
December 1, 2017; 5:30 PM	Northern Iowa	3–0	Louisville	Maturi Pavilion, Minneapolis, Minnesota
December 1, 2017; 5:30 PM	(25–21, 25–15, 27–25)			Maturi Pavilion, Minneapolis, Minnesota

December 1, 2017; 8:00 PM	Minnesota	3–0	North Dakota	Maturi Pavilion, Minneapolis, Minnesota; Attendance: 4,526
December 1, 2017; 8:00 PM	(25–20, 25–15, 25–21)			Maturi Pavilion, Minneapolis, Minnesota; Attendance: 4,526

December 1, 2017; 8:00 PM	San Diego	3–1	LSU	Galen Center, Los Angeles, California
December 1, 2017; 8:00 PM	(25–22, 24–26, 25–23, 25–21)			Galen Center, Los Angeles, California

December 1, 2017; 10:00 PM	Central Arkansas	1–3	Southern Cal	Galen Center, Los Angeles, California; Attendance: 599
December 1, 2017; 10:00 PM	(25–22, 23–25, 18–25, 12–25)			Galen Center, Los Angeles, California; Attendance: 599

December 1, 2017; 8:30 PM	Denver	0–3	Cal Poly	Pauley Pavilion, Los Angeles, California
December 1, 2017; 8:30 PM	(20–25, 18–25, 18–25)			Pauley Pavilion, Los Angeles, California

December 1, 2017; 11:00 PM	UCLA	3–0	Austin Peay	Pauley Pavilion, Los Angeles, California; Attendance: 1,057
December 1, 2017; 11:00 PM	(25–10, 25–13, 25–15)			Pauley Pavilion, Los Angeles, California; Attendance: 1,057

November 30, 2017; 4:30 PM	Miami (FL)	3–1	Charleston	O'Connell Center, Gainesville, Florida
November 30, 2017; 4:30 PM	(25–21, 21–25, 25–20, 25–15)			O'Connell Center, Gainesville, Florida

November 30, 2017; 7:00 PM	Alabama State	0–3	Florida	O'Connell Center, Gainesville, Florida; Attendance: 2,215
November 30, 2017; 7:00 PM	(9–25, 13–25, 9–25)			O'Connell Center, Gainesville, Florida; Attendance: 2,215

==== Second round ====
December 2, 2017; 9:00 PM	Minnesota	3–1	UNI	Maturi Pavilion, Minneapolis, Minnesota; Attendance: 4,657
December 2, 2017; 9:00 PM	(25–18, 20–25, 25–19, 25–17)			Maturi Pavilion, Minneapolis, Minnesota; Attendance: 4,657

December 2, 2017; 8:00 PM	San Diego	2–3	USC	Galen Center, Los Angeles, California; Attendance: 569
December 2, 2017; 8:00 PM	(22–25, 26–24, 26–24, 22–25, 11–15)			Galen Center, Los Angeles, California; Attendance: 569

December 2, 2017; 10:00 PM	UCLA	3–1	Cal Poly	Pauley Pavilion, Los Angeles, California; Attendance: 1,103
December 2, 2017; 10:00 PM	(26–28, 25–19, 25–16, 25–18)			Pauley Pavilion, Los Angeles, California; Attendance: 1,103

December 1, 2017; 7:00 PM	Miami (FL)	1–3	Florida	O'Connell Center, Gainesville, Florida; Attendance: 3,078
December 1, 2017; 7:00 PM	(14–25, 25–19, 11–25, 23–25)			O'Connell Center, Gainesville, Florida; Attendance: 3,078

==== Regional semifinals ====
December 8, 2017; 4:00 PM	UCLA	1–3	Florida	O'Connell Center, Gainesville, Florida; Attendance: 3,128
December 8, 2017; 4:00 PM	(25–23, 17–25, 17–25, 17–25)			O'Connell Center, Gainesville, Florida; Attendance: 3,128

December 8, 2017; 6:00 PM	USC	3–0	Minnesota	O'Connell Center, Gainesville, Florida; Attendance: 3,128
December 8, 2017; 6:00 PM	(25–23, 28–26, 25–16)			O'Connell Center, Gainesville, Florida; Attendance: 3,128

==== Regional Final ====
December 9, 2017; 6:00 PM	USC	2–3	Florida	O'Connell Center, Gainesville, Florida; Attendance: 3,741
December 9, 2017; 6:00 PM	(23–25, 25–20, 25–18, 24–26, 11–15)			O'Connell Center, Gainesville, Florida; Attendance: 3,741

== Final Four ==
National semifinals
1	Penn State	2
5	Nebraska	3
3	Stanford	2
2	Florida	3

National Championship
5	Nebraska	3
2	Florida	1

=== National semifinals ===
December 14, 2017; 7:00 PM	Nebraska	3–2	Penn State	Sprint Center, Kansas City, Missouri; Attendance: 18,374
December 14, 2017; 7:00 PM	(25–18, 23–25, 24–26, 28–26, 15–11)			Sprint Center, Kansas City, Missouri; Attendance: 18,374

December 14, 2017; 9:00 PM	Stanford	2–3	Florida	Sprint Center, Kansas City, Missouri; Attendance: 18,374
December 14, 2017; 9:00 PM	(22–25, 21–25, 25–18, 25–18, 10–15)			Sprint Center, Kansas City, Missouri; Attendance: 18,374

=== National Championship ===
December 16, 2017; 9:00 PM	Nebraska	3–1	Florida	Sprint Center, Kansas City, Missouri; Attendance: 18,516
December 16, 2017; 9:00 PM	(25–22, 25–17, 18–25, 25–16)			Sprint Center, Kansas City, Missouri; Attendance: 18,516

==== Final Four All-Tournament Team ====
- Mikaela Foecke – Nebraska (Co-Most Outstanding Player)
- Kelly Hunter – Nebraska (Co-Most Outstanding Player)
- Kenzie Maloney – Nebraska
- Carli Snyder – Florida
- Rhamat Alhassan – Florida
- Merete Lutz – Stanford
- Simone Lee – Penn State

== Record by conference ==
Conference	Teams	W	L	Pct.	R32	S16	E8	F4	CM	NC
Pac-12	9	16	9	.640	8	5	2	1	—	—
Big Ten	8	20	7	.741	7	6	3	2	1	1
ACC	6	3	6	.333	3	—	—	—	—	—
Big 12	4	5	4	.556	3	1	1	—	—	—
SEC	4	10	4	.714	3	3	2	1	1	—
Big East	2	1	2	.333	1	—	—	—	—	—
Big South	2	0	2	.000	—	—	—	—	—	—
Big West	2	1	2	.333	1	—	—	—	—	—
Colonial	2	0	2	.000	—	—	—	—	—	—
MVC	2	1	2	.333	1	—	—	—	—	—
WCC	2	3	2	.600	2	1	1	—	—	—
The American	1	1	1	.500	1	—	—	—	—	—
C-USA	1	1	1	.500	1	—	—	—	—	—
Mountain West	1	1	1	.500	1	—	—	—	—	—
18 Others	18	0	18	.000	—	—	—	—	—	—

The columns R32, S16, E8, F4, CM, and NC respectively stand for the Round of 32, Sweet Sixteen, Elite Eight, Final Four, Championship Match, and National Champion.

== NCAA tournament record ==
There is one NCAA tournament record that was set in the 2017 tournament:

- Services aces, tournament (team record) — Nebraska — 44 total aces (9 vs. Stony Brook, 7 vs. Washington State, 9 vs. Colorado, 5 vs. Kentucky, 10 vs. Penn State, 4 vs. Florida.)
