= List of Gamma Iota Sigma chapters =

Gamma Iota Sigma is a collegiate professional fraternity, founded in 1966 at Ohio State University. In the following list of chapters, active chapters are indicated in bold and inactive chapters are in italic.

Chapter	Charter date and range	Institution	Location	Status	Ref.
**Alpha**	April 16, 1966	Ohio State University	Columbus, Ohio	Active	(Note: Chapter formed from the OSU Insurance Society, which started at Ohio State University in the early 1960s.)
**Beta**	November 10, 1967	Bowling Green State University	Bowling Green, Ohio	Active	
**Gamma**	March 11, 1969	University of Cincinnati	Cincinnati, Ohio	Active	
Delta	October 21, 1970 – xxxx ?	Orange Coast College	Costa Mesa, California	Inactive	
**Epsilon**	March 3, 1972	University of Alabama	Tuscaloosa, Alabama	Active	
**Zeta**	February 24, 1973	Georgia State University	Atlanta, Georgia	Active	
**Eta**	February 21, 1975	University of Georgia	Athens, Georgia	Active	
Theta	October 19, 1975 – xxxx ?	Louisiana State University	Baton Rouge, Louisiana	Inactive	
**Iota**	October 4, 1975	Florida State University	Tallahassee, Florida	Active	
**Kappa**	October 29, 1975	Arizona State University	Tempe, Arizona	Active	
**Lambda**	October 16, 1976	University of South Carolina	Columbia, South Carolina	Active	
**Mu**	October 16, 1976	University of Mississippi	Oxford, Mississippi	Active	
**Nu**	May 7, 1977	Central Michigan University	Mount Pleasant, Michigan	Active	
**Xi**	February 12, 1978	University of Connecticut	Storrs, Connecticut	Active	
Omicron	April 14, 1978 – xxxx ?	Arkansas State University	Jonesboro, Arkansas	Inactive	
**Pi**	April 3, 1978	Mississippi State University	Starkville, Mississippi	Active	
**Rho**	April 25, 1979	Appalachian State University	Boone, North Carolina	Active	
**Sigma**	November 21, 1980	Temple University	Philadelphia, Pennsylvania	Active	
**Tau**	February 4, 1981	Howard University	Washington, D.C.	Active	
**Upsilon**	April 29, 1981 – xxxx ?; 2013	Ferris State University	Big Rapids, Michigan	Active	
**Phi**	April 17, 1982	Ball State University	Muncie, Indiana	Active	
**Chi**	May 1, 1982	Drake University	Des Moines, Iowa	Active	
**Psi**	April 19, 1983	Eastern Kentucky University	Richmond, Kentucky	Active	
**Omega**	March 29, 1984	Middle Tennessee State University	Murfreesboro, Tennessee	Active	
**Alpha Alpha**	September 23, 1986	Olivet College	Olivet, Michigan	Active	
Alpha Beta	February 15, 1989 – xxxx ?	Pennsylvania State University	University Park, Pennsylvania	Inactive	
Alpha Gamma	February 15, 1989 – xxxx ?	University of Pennsylvania	Philadelphia, Pennsylvania	Inactive	
**Alpha Delta**	March 15, 1989	La Salle University	Philadelphia, Pennsylvania	Active	
**Alpha Epsilon**	February 12, 1990	Indiana State University	Terre Haute, Indiana	Active	
Alpha Zeta	February 1, 1991 – xxxx ?	University of Memphis	Memphis, Tennessee	Inactive	
Alpha Eta	April 26, 1991	California State University, Sacramento	Sacramento, California	Inactive	
Alpha Theta	May 11, 1991 – xxxx ?	St. Cloud State University	St. Cloud, Minnesota	Inactive	
**Alpha Iota**	November 21, 1991	St. John's University	New York City, New York	Active	
**Alpha Kappa**	November 21, 1991	Illinois State University	Normal, Illinois	Active	
**Alpha Lambda**	September 30, 1993	Missouri State University	Springfield, Missouri	Active	
**Alpha Mu**	April 21, 1994	Virginia Commonwealth University	Richmond, Virginia	Active	
**Alpha Nu**	May 4, 1996	Ohio University	Athens, Ohio	Active	
**Alpha Xi**	May 7, 1998	Morgan State University	Baltimore, Maryland	Active	
**Alpha Omicron**	February 5, 1999	University of Hartford	West Hartford, Connecticut	Active	
**Alpha Pi**	February 23, 2001	Baylor University	Waco, Texas	Active	
Alpha Rho	October 4, 2001 – 20xx ?	Fanshawe College	London, Ontario, Canada	Inactive	
Alpha Sigma	November 9, 2001 – 20xx ?	University of Louisiana at Monroe	Monroe, Louisiana	Inactive	
**Alpha Tau**	February 27, 2003	University of North Carolina at Charlotte	Charlotte, North Carolina	Active	
**Alpha Upsilon**	April 11, 2003	University of Houston	Houston, Texas	Active	
**Alpha Phi**	April 15, 2003	Old Dominion University	Norfolk, Virginia	Active	
**Alpha Chi**	October 2, 2004	Bradley University	Peoria, Illinois	Active	
**Alpha Psi**	October 8, 2005	University of Central Arkansas	Conway, Arkansas	Active	
**Alpha Omega**	June 9, 2006	Saint Joseph's University	Philadelphia, Pennsylvania	Active	
**Beta Alpha**	April 27, 2007	University of Iowa	Iowa City, Iowa	Active	
**Beta Beta**	November 28, 2007	New Mexico State University	Las Cruces, New Mexico	Active	
**Beta Gamma**	February 8, 2008	California State University, Fullerton	Fullerton, California	Active	
Beta Delta	November 13, 2008 – 20xx ?	Utica University	Utica, New York	Inactive	
**Beta Epsilon**	November 22, 2008	University of Central Oklahoma	Edmond, Oklahoma	Active	
**Beta Zeta**	February 18, 2012	University of North Texas	Denton, Texas	Active	
**Beta Eta**	April 22, 2013	Northern Michigan University	Marquette, Michigan	Active	
**Beta Theta**	October 3, 2013	East Carolina University	Greenville, North Carolina	Active	
**Beta Iota**	November 1, 2013	Troy University	Troy, Alabama	Active	
**Beta Kappa**	March 21, 2014	University of Houston–Downtown	Houston, Texas	Active	
**Beta Lambda**	April 15, 2014	Butler University	Indianapolis, Indiana	Active	
**Beta Mu**	April 26, 2014	University of Colorado Denver	Denver, Colorado	Active	
**Beta Nu**	November 7, 2014	Kent State University	Kent, Ohio	Active	
**Beta Xi**	November 10, 2014	St. Mary's University, Texas	San Antonio, Texas	Active	
Beta Omicron	November 20, 2014 – 20xx ?	Columbia University	New York City, New York	Inactive	
**Beta Pi**	February 19, 2015	University of St. Thomas	Saint Paul, Minnesota	Active	
Beta Rho	October 22, 2015 – 20xx ?	University of Wisconsin–Oshkosh	Oshkosh, Wisconsin	Inactive	
**Beta Sigma**	November 12, 2015	University of Southern Maine	Portland, Maine	Active	
**Beta Tau**	December 6, 2015	University of Pittsburgh	Pittsburgh, Pennsylvania	Active	
Beta Upsilon	February 12, 2016 – 20xx ?	University of Hawaiʻi at West Oʻahu	Kapolei, Hawaii	Inactive	
**Beta Phi**	March 5, 2016	University of Texas at Dallas	Richardson, Texas	Active	
**Beta Chi**	April 29, 2016	University of Massachusetts Amherst,	Amherst, Massachusetts	Active	
**Beta Psi**	September 9, 2016	University of Missouri	Columbia, Missouri	Active	
**Beta Omega**	December 6, 2016	Ohio Dominican University	Columbus, Ohio	Active	
**Gamma Alpha**	March 29, 2017	Gallaudet University	Washington, D.C.	Active	
**Gamma Beta**	September 14, 2017	University of Akron	Akron, Ohio	Active	
**Gamma Gamma**	October 14, 2017	Iowa State University	Ames, Iowa	Active	
**Gamma Delta**	December 2, 2017	Northwood University	Midland, Michigan	Active	
**Gamma Epsilon**	November 9, 2018	North Central College	Naperville, Illinois	Active	
**Gamma Zeta**	November 10, 2018	University of Texas at Austin	Austin, Texas	Active	
**Gamma Eta**	November 30, 2018	Mercer University	Macon, Georgia	Active	
**Gamma Theta**	December 6, 2018	University of Texas at El Paso	El Paso, Texas	Active	
**Gamma Iota**	February 7, 2019	University of Nebraska–Lincoln	Lincoln, Nebraska	Active	
**Gamma Kappa**	February 21, 2019	Mercyhurst University	Erie, Pennsylvania	Active	
**Gamma Lambda**	April 18, 2019	University of Illinois Urbana-Champaign	Champaign and Urbana, Illinois	Active	
**Gamma Mu**	September 20, 2019	Lansing Community College	Lansing, Michigan	Active	
**Gamma Nu**	September 27, 2019	Samford University	Homewood, Alabama	Active	
**Gamma Xi**	September 27, 2019	Texas Christian University	Fort Worth, Texas	Active	
**Gamma Omicron**	November 7, 2019	University of Southern California	Los Angeles, California	Active	
**Gamma Pi**	November 15, 2019	University of Mount Union	Alliance, Ohio	Active	
**Gamma Rho**	February 29, 2020	Bentley University	Waltham, Massachusetts	Active	
**Gamma Sigma**	December 10, 2020	University of Baltimore	Baltimore, Maryland	Active	
Gamma Tau	December 10, 2020 – 202x ?	University of Louisiana at Lafayette	Lafayette, Louisiana	Inactive	
**Gamma Upsilon**	December 10, 2020	University of Minnesota	Minneapolis and Saint Paul, Minnesota	Active	
**Gamma Phi**	December 10, 2020	Utah Valley University	Orem, Utah	Active	
**Gamma Chi**	November 19, 2021	Slippery Rock University	Slippery Rock, Pennsylvania	Active	
**Gamma Psi**	December 3, 2021	University of Virginia	Charlottesville, Virginia	Active	
**Gamma Omega**	September 30, 2022	University of Wisconsin–Madison	Madison, Wisconsin	Active	
**Delta Alpha**	September 30, 2022	Northern Arizona University	Flagstaff, Arizona	Active	
**Delta Gamma**	September 30, 2022	DePauw University	Greencastle, Indiana	Active	
**Delta Beta**	2023 Spring	Florida State University	Tallahassee, Florida	Active	
**Delta Delta**	2023 Spring	Stillman College	Tuscaloosa, Alabama	Active	
