= University of Hawaiʻi at Hilo =

Public university in Hilo, Hawaii, US

- Former names: Hilo Center at Lyman Hall (1945–1950); University of Hawai'i Hilo Branch (1950–1970)
- Motto: Maluna aʻe o nā lāhui āpau ke ola ke kānaka (Hawaiian)
- Motto in English: "Above all nations is humanity"
- Type: Public university
- Established: 1945; 81 years ago
- Parent institution: University of Hawaiʻi
- Accreditation: WSCUS
- Academic affiliations: Space-grant
- Endowment: $491.36 million (2023) (system-wide)
- Chancellor: Bonnie D. Irwin
- President: Wendy Hensel
- Faculty: 210 (2016)
- Students: 3,539 (fall 2019)
- Undergraduates: 2,971
- Postgraduates: 568
- Location: Hilo, Hawaii, United States; 19°41′59″N 155°04′54″W
- Campus: 115 acres (47 ha)
- Newspaper: Ke Kalahea
- Colors: Red and black
- Nickname: Vulcans
- Sporting affiliations: NCAA Division II – PacWest
- Mascot: Vulcan
- Website: hilo.hawaii.edu

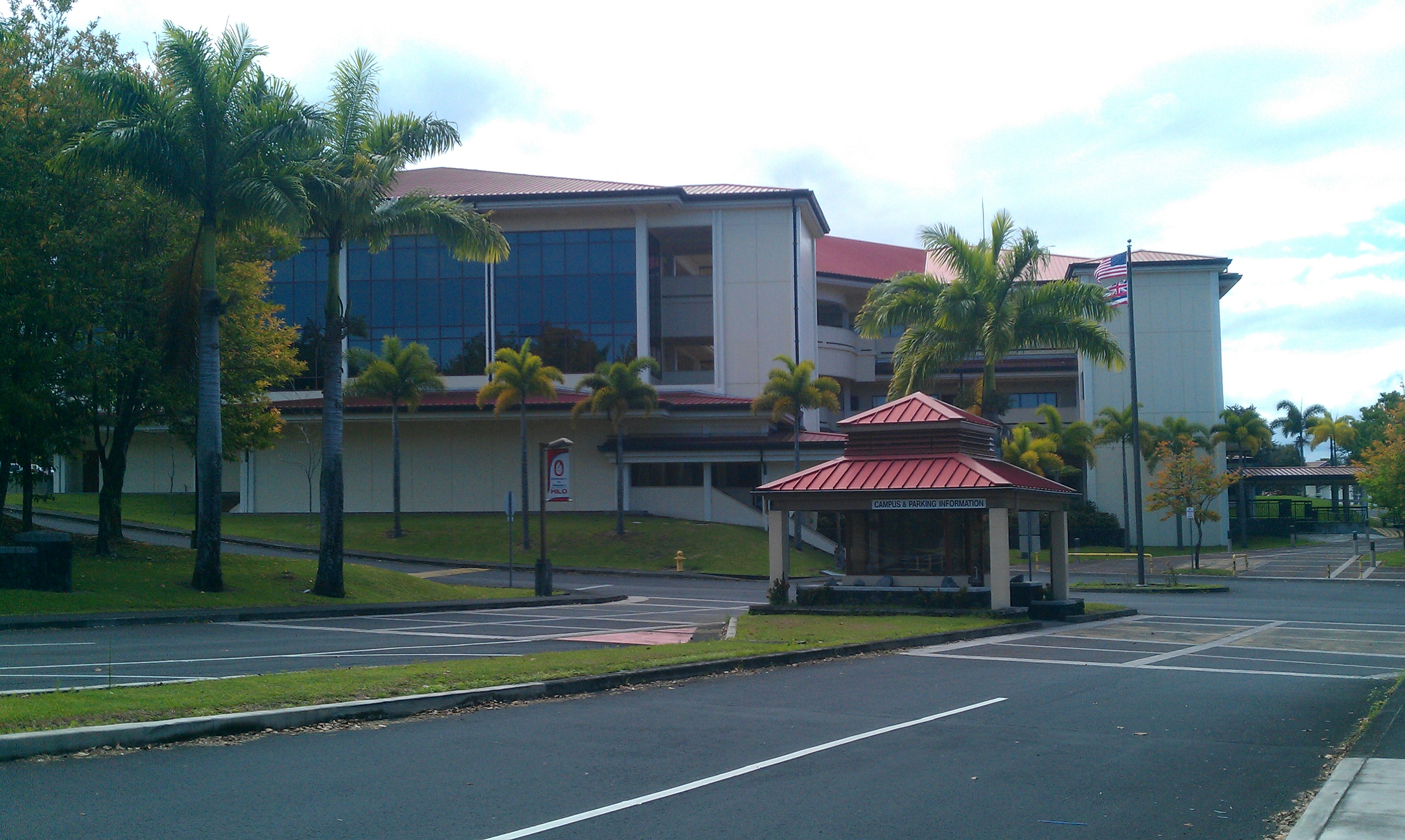
University of Hawaiʻi at Hilo

The University of Hawaiʻi at Hilo (UH Hilo) is a public university in Hilo, Hawaiʻi, United States. It is one of ten campuses of the University of Hawaiʻi System. It was founded as Hilo Center at Lyman Hall of the Hilo Boys School in 1945 and was a branch campus of the University of Hawaiʻi at Mānoa. In 1970 it was reorganized by an act of the Hawaiʻi State Legislature and became a campus within the newly created University of Hawaiʻi System.

The university has been accredited by the WASC Senior College and University Commission or its predecessor since 1976. It offers thirty-three undergraduate and three graduate degree programs and has about 3,000 students; most students are residents of Hawaiʻi but many are international students.

== History ==
Although post-high school non-credit courses had been offered in Hilo as early as 1945, under the University of Hawaiʻi at Mānoa's Adult Education Services, the university was established as Hilo Center at Lyman Hall of the Hilo Boys School. After an attempt to close the school in 1951 by Governor Oren E. Long, Big Island residents, local legislators, and the University of Hawaiʻi Alumni Association led efforts to save its only college to then establish the University of Hawaiʻi Hilo Branch as a two-year campus of the university.

In 1955, the branch moved to its present location on a 30-acre (12 ha) parcel of land with an enlarged faculty to support its growing student population.

In 1964, University of Hawaiʻi president Thomas Hamilton released a feasibility study on creating a statewide system of community colleges operating as part of the university. The study recommended that the Hilo Branch and the Hawaii Technical School to create a community college in Hilo. However, due to resistance from Big Island legislators, Hawaii Technical School became Hawaii Community College with oversight from the Hawaii Department of Education. Both Hawaii Community College and the Hilo Branch, however, would share the same facilities until 1984.

In 1970, University of Hawaiʻi president Harlan Cleveland led efforts to reorganize the Hilo Branch by renaming the campus to Hilo College and merged with Hawaii Community College. Collectively they were known as the University of Hawaiʻi at Hilo with Paul Miwa as its first chancellor.

Amid a failed plan to create a new state college system, of which the UH Hilo would be its 'flagship', Hawaiʻi Community College was separated from university in 1990. In the 1990s, the former branch campus of the University of Hawaiʻi at Mānoa would emphasize liberal arts, education, agriculture, and vocational programs.

== Academics ==
Undergraduate demographics as of Fall 2023
Race and ethnicity	Total
Two or more races	35%
White	20%
Hispanic	17%
Asian	13%
Native Hawaiian/Pacific Islander	8%
International student	5%
Black	1%
Economic diversity
Low-income (Note: The percentage of students who received an income-based federal Pell grant intended for low-income students.)	42%
Affluent (Note: The percentage of students who are a part of the American middle class at the bare minimum.)	58%

Academic rankings

Master's
- Washington Monthly: 166

Regional
- U.S. News & World Report: 96-127

National
- WSJ/College Pulse: 601-800

The university specializes in marine science, volcanology, astronomy, and Hawaiian studies. The Masters of Arts program in Hawaiian Language and Literature was the first in the United States to focus on an indigenous language.

=== Colleges ===
- College of Agriculture, Forestry, and Natural Resource Management
- College of Arts & Sciences
- College of Business and Economics
- Ka Haka ‘Ula O Ke‘elikōlani, College of Hawaiian Language
- Daniel K. Inouye College of Pharmacy (DKICP)
- College of Natural and Health Sciences

=== Undergraduate ===
The University of Hawaiʻi at Hilo offers BA, BBA, BS, and BSN degrees in addition to certificates. Students can also choose minors in some programs.

=== Graduate ===
The University of Hawaiʻi at Hilo offers a Master of Arts in Counseling Psychology, which meets educational requirements for licensure as a Licensed Mental Health Counselor. The program is accredited by the Masters in Psychology and Counseling Accreditation Council (MPCAC).

== Athletics ==
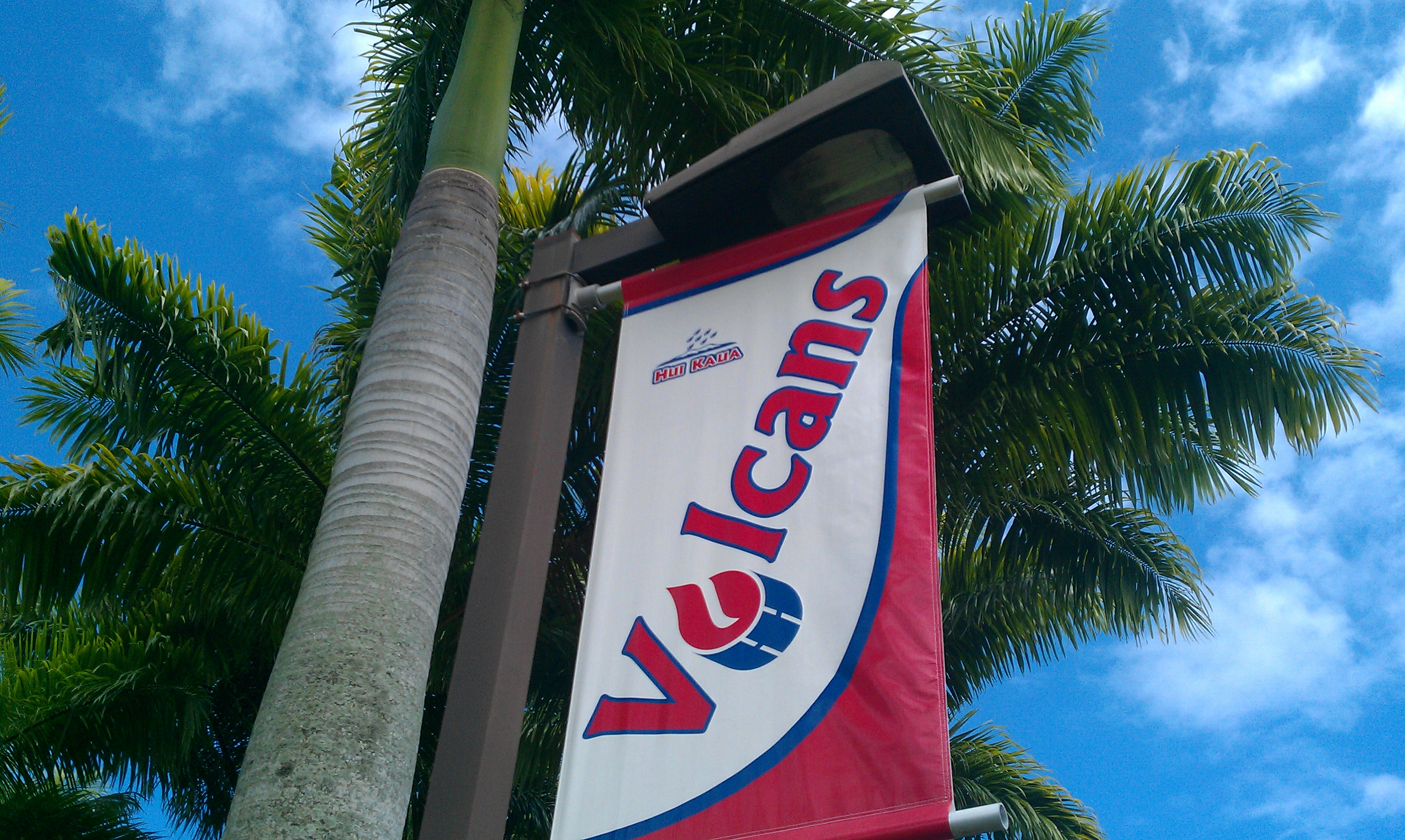
Vulcans banner

Until 1994 University of Hawaiʻi at Hilo belonged to the National Association of Intercollegiate Athletics or NAIA. Since 1992, it has been a member of the NCAA Division II Pacific West Conference. It fields teams in baseball, basketball, cross country, golf, soccer, softball, tennis and volleyball. The sports teams nickname is the Vulcans.

== Chancellors ==
Shared with University of Hawaiʻi at West Oʻahu 1976–1997.

- Bonnie D. Irwin (2019–present)
- Marcia Sakai (Interim, 2017–2019)
- Donald O. Straney (2010–2017)
- Rose Tseng (1998–2010)
- Kenneth Perrin (1993–1997)
- Edward J. Kormondy (1986–1993)
- Edwin Mookini (1975–1978)
- Paul Miwa (1970–?)

== Argument for separation ==
There has been a growing movement throughout the last decade to separate the Hilo campus from the University of Hawaiʻi System, creating a "Hawaiʻi State University". Supporters of the separation argue that the growing Hilo campus is "shortchanged" by its sister campus in Mānoa and that being independent of the system would allow the college to grow faster, better serve the community, and draw in more money from independent sources. Opponents argue that the state is too small for competing university systems and that financial divisions between Mānoa and Hilo are fair, given that Mānoa places emphasis on research and Hilo places emphasis on teaching. There are also concerns that this movement will hurt relationships between the Hilo campus and the rest of the University of Hawaiʻi System.

A bill was introduced in the 2005 session of the House of Representatives of the Hawaiʻi State Legislature to draft legislation to spin off the Hilo campus as the independent Hawaiʻi State University. The bill was approved by the House Higher Education Committee but no hearing on the bill was planned by the House Finance Committee, effectively killing it.

== Points of interest ==
=== University Park ===
- ʻImiloa Astronomy Center
- College of Tropical Agriculture and Human Resources (CTAHR)
- USDA Pacific Basin – Agricultural Research Center
- Kū Kahau ʻUla – University of Hawaiʻi Institute for Astronomy
- Daniel K. Inouye College of Pharmacy (DKICP) – formerly J. M. Long Pavilion
- East Asian Observatory, owning the facility of the old Joint Astronomy Centre (JAC)

=== Main campus ===
- University Classroom Building (UCB)
- Marine Science Building (MSB)
- Sciences & Technology Building (STB)
- Edith Kanakaʻole Hall (EKH)
- Wentworth Hall
- Campus Center
- Student Life Center & Pool
- Edwin H. Mookini Library & Media Center
- University of Hawaiʻi Hilo Student Services Building
- University of Hawaiʻi Hilo New Gymnasium
- University of Hawaiʻi Hilo Performing Arts Center

== Alumni ==
- Jon Hill, former White House Executive Chef
- Israel Kamakawiwoʻole, musician
- Harry Kim (attended), Mayor of Hawaii County
- Anthony Leone (attended), professional Mixed Martial Artist
- Sarah Palin (attended), former governor of Alaska
- Tarisi Vunidilo, Fijian archaeologist and curator
- Paʻele Kiakona, organizer and member-elect of the Hawaii House of Representatives for the 14th district

== See also ==
- University of Hawaiʻi at Hilo Botanical Gardens
- Hawaii–Hilo Vulcans women's volleyball
