= University of Hawaiʻi =

Public higher education system of Hawaii

University of Hawaiʻi System
- Motto: Maluna aʻe o nā lāhui āpau ke ola ke kānaka (Hawaiian)
- Motto in English: "Above all nations is humanity"
- Type: Public higher education system
- Established: 1907; 119 years ago
- Academic affiliations: Association of Southeast Asian Institutions of Higher Learning; Western Association of Schools and Colleges
- Endowment: $491.36 million (2023)
- President: Wendy Hensel
- Students: 50,310
- Location: Honolulu, Hawaii, U.S.
- Campus: 3 universities, 7 community colleges, 5 research centers, 3 university centers, 4 education centers
- Colors: Green and black
- Website: hawaii.edu
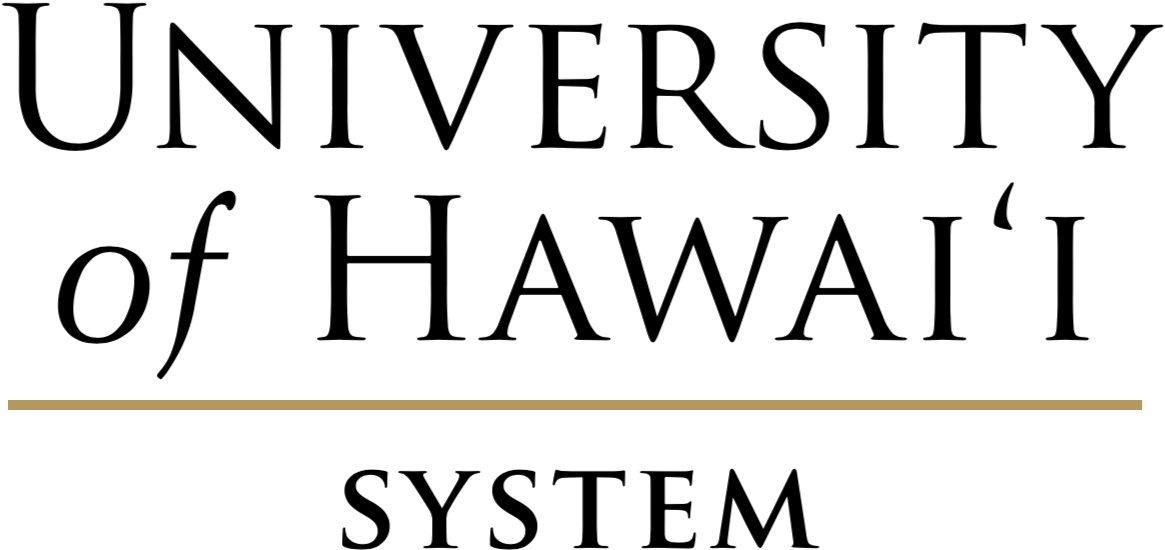

University of Hawaiʻi locations
Black: Universities; Red: Colleges.

The University of Hawaiʻi System (Note: The university's official name uses the traditional Hawaiian spelling, with an ʻokina in Hawaiʻi.) (Note: Also referred to as University of Hawaiʻi and popularly known as UH; Hawaiian: Ke Kulanui o Hawaiʻi) is the public higher education system of the state of Hawaii. The system confers associate, bachelor's, master's, and doctoral degrees through three universities, seven community colleges, an employment training center, three university centers, four education centers, and various other research facilities distributed across six islands throughout the state of Hawaii.

All schools in the University of Hawaiʻi System are accredited by the Western Association of Schools and Colleges. The system's main administrative offices are located on the property of the University of Hawaiʻi at Mānoa in Honolulu.

== History ==
The University of Hawai'i System was created in 1965, combining the State of Hawai'i's technical and community colleges into a single system within the former University of Hawaiʻi.

The original University of Hawaiʻi was established by the Territory of Hawaiʻi in 1907 as a land-grant college for agriculture and mechanical arts, holding its first classes that same year. In 1912, it moved to its current location in Mānoa Valley and was renamed the College of Hawaii. In 1919, the Hawaiʻi Territorial Legislature granted the College of Hawaiʻi university status, renaming it the University of Hawaiʻi.

In 1965, the state legislature created a system of community colleges and placed it within the university. To distinguish it from other campuses in the University of Hawaiʻi System, the university was renamed the University of Hawaiʻi at Mānoa in 1972.

== Colleges and universities ==
The University of Hawaiʻi at Mānoa is the flagship institution of the University of Hawaiʻi system. It was founded as a land-grant college under the terms of the Morrill Acts of 1862 and 1890. Programs include Hawaiian/Pacific Studies, Astronomy, East Asian Languages and Literature, Asian Studies, Comparative Philosophy, Marine Science, Second Language Studies, along with Botany, Engineering, Ethnomusicology, Geophysics, Law, Business, Linguistics, Mathematics, and Medicine.

The second-largest institution is the University of Hawaiʻi at Hilo on Hawaiʻi island, with over 3,000 students. The University of Hawaiʻi at West Oʻahu in Kapolei primarily serves students residing in western and central suburban Honolulu's communities.

The University of Hawaiʻi Community College System comprises four island campuses on Oʻahu and one each on Maui, Kauaʻi, and Hawaiʻi. These colleges were established to improve course accessibility for more Hawaiʻi residents and provide an affordable means of easing the transition from secondary school/high school to college for many students. University of Hawaiʻi education centers are located in more remote areas of the State and its several islands, supporting rural communities through distance education.

=== Universities ===
- University of Hawaiʻi at Mānoa (established 1907)
- University of Hawaiʻi at Hilo (established 1945)
- University of Hawaiʻi at West Oʻahu (established 1976)

=== Colleges ===
- University of Hawaiʻi Maui College

=== Community colleges ===
- Hawaiʻi Community College in Hilo
- Hawaiʻi Community College at Pālamanui
- Honolulu Community College
- Kapiʻolani Community College
- Kauaʻi Community College
- Leeward Community College
- Windward Community College

=== Professional schools ===
- Daniel K. Inouye College of Pharmacy
- School of Ocean and Earth Science and Technology
- John A. Burns School of Medicine
- William S. Richardson School of Law
- Shidler College of Business

=== Research facilities ===
- Center for Philippine Studies
- Cancer Research Center of Hawaiʻi
- East-West Center
- Haleakalā Observatory
- Hawaiʻi Natural Energy Institute
- Institute for Astronomy
- Institute of Geophysics and Planetology
- Institute of Marine Biology
- Lyon Arboretum
- Mauna Kea Observatory
- W. M. Keck Observatory
- Waikīkī Aquarium

=== University centers ===
- University of Hawaiʻi Center West Hawaiʻi
- University of Hawaiʻi Center Kauaʻi
- University of Hawaiʻi Center Maui

=== Education centers ===
- Molokaʻi Education Center
- Lānaʻi Education Center
- Hāna Education Center
- Waiʻanae Education Center
- Lāhainā Education Center

== Board of Regents ==
In accordance with Article X, Section 6 of the Constitution of Hawaii, the University of Hawaiʻi is governed by a Board of Regents. The board consists of 15 unpaid members nominated by a Regents Candidate Advisory Council, The Current chair of the advisory council is Brigitte Yoshino. From the list of nominees sent by the council the Governor appoints and individual who must get confirmed by the state legislature. The Board of Regents oversees all aspects of governance for the university system, including its internal structure and management, and also appoints, evaluates, and, if necessary, removes the president of the University of Hawaiʻi.

=== Student regents ===
The university's governing board includes a current student, appointed by the governor of Hawaiʻi, who serves a two-year term as a full voting regent. The Hawaiʻi State Legislature approved the practice of appointing a student to the board in 1997.

== Notable alumni ==
Alumni of the University of Hawaiʻi system include many notable individuals from various walks of life. Senators Daniel Inouye and Tammy Duckworth are both veterans of the U.S. military who were injured in the line of duty and later entered government service. Bette Midler and Georgia Engel are successful entertainers. Composer Hsiung-Zee Wong also attended the University of Hawai'i. President Barack Obama's parents, Barack Obama Sr. and Ann Dunham, and half-sister, Maya Soetoro-Ng, earned degrees from the Mānoa campus, where his parents met in a Russian language class. His mother earned three degrees from the University of Hawaiʻi, including a PhD in anthropology.

Mazie Hirono is a current U.S. senator and a graduate of the University of Hawaii with a BA in psychology. She is the first elected female senator from Hawaii, the first Asian-American woman elected to the Senate, the first U.S. senator born in Japan, and the nation's first Buddhist senator.

Alice Augusta Ball was the first woman to graduate from the College of Hawaiʻi (now the University of Hawaiʻi) in 1915, as well as the first African American research chemist and instructor in the college's chemistry department. She was also the first person to successfully develop a water-soluble form of chaulmoogra oil, used for decades to relieve the symptoms of Hansen's disease (leprosy).

== Notable faculty ==
The University of Hawaiʻi system has had many noteworthy faculty members, including visiting faculty and those who arrived after winning major awards, such as Nobel Laureate Georg von Békésy. Ryuzo Yanagimachi, principal investigator of the research group that developed a method of cloning from adult animal cells, remains on the faculty.

In July 2019, Bob Huey, a professor of Japanese literature in the Department of East Asian Languages and Literatures, was presented with the Order of the Rising Sun, Gold Rays with Neck Ribbon, one of Japan's highest honors for non-Japanese citizens.

== Athletics ==
Some universities has athletic programs. University of Hawaiʻi at Mānoa competes in the Big West Conference of the NCAA Division I. They will join Mountain West Conference in the 2026–27 season. University of Hawaiʻi at Hilo competes in the PacWest Conference of the NCAA Division II.
