= Mike Wilton =

American volleyball coach

Current position
- Title: Volunteer assistant
- Team: Utah State
- Conference: Mountain West

Biographical details
- Born: 1943/1944 (age 81–83)
- Education: BYU–Hawaii (1972)

Coaching career (HC unless noted)

Men's volleyball
- 1973–1975: Cal Poly
- 1974: UC Santa Barbara (volunteer asst.)
- 1976: BYU (volunteer asst.)
- 1976: BYU–Hawaii
- 1993–2009: Hawaii
- 2011–2015: BYU (asst.)

Women's volleyball
- 1978–1989: Cal Poly
- 2009: BYU (asst.)
- 2010: Hawaii–Hilo (asst.)
- 2015–2016: Southern Utah (asst.)
- 2017–2018: Utah Valley (volunteer asst.)
- 2019–present: Utah State (volunteer asst.)

Accomplishments and honors

Championships
- 4× MPSF Pacific Division (1995, 1996, 1998, 2001)

Awards
- AVCA Coach of the Year (2002)

Mike Wilton is an American volleyball coach.

== Career ==
Wilton served in the United States Marine Corps after high school. He played basketball at Santa Barbara City College, surfed and worked in construction. In 1969 he played volleyball with Church College of Hawaii (now Brigham Young University Hawaii. In 1970 he became an assistant at Brigham Young University (BYU), Provo, Utah. In 1973 he became Cal Poly-San Luis Obispo's men volleyball coach. In 1974 Wilton also served as an assistant UC Santa Barbara men's volleyball, and 1976 BYU's men's volleyball coach. From 1978 to 1989 he was Cal Poly's women's volleyball head coach. In 1993 he took over as Warrior Volleyball as head coach.

On April 11, 2009, Wilton announced that he was resigning from his Hawaii head coaching job. He accepted a position as a women's assistant coach at Brigham Young University.
