= West Texas A&M Buffaloes =

Intercollegiate sports teams of West Texas A&M University

- University: West Texas A&M University
- Nickname: Buffaloes/Buffs (men); Lady Buffs (women)
- NCAA: Division II
- Conference: LSC (primary)
- Athletic director: Doug Lipinski
- Location: Canyon, Texas
- Varsity teams: 14 (7 men's, 7 women's)
- Football stadium: Bain–Schaeffer Buffalo Stadium
- Basketball arena: First United Bank Center
- Baseball stadium: Wilder Park
- Softball stadium: Schaeffer Park
- Soccer stadium: The Pitch
- Other venues: WTAMU Fieldhouse
- Colors: Maroon and white
- Website: gobuffsgo.com

Team NCAA championships
- 10

The West Texas A&M Buffaloes, also known as the WTAMU Buffaloes or WT Buffaloes, and formerly West Texas State Buffaloes and WTSU Buffaloes, are the athletic teams that represent West Texas A&M University, located in Canyon, Texas, in NCAA Division II intercollegiate sports. The Buffaloes, colloquially known as the Buffs (men) and Lady Buffs (women), compete as members of the Lone Star Conference for all 14 varsity sports.

West Texas A&M was a member of the Border Intercollegiate Athletic Association from 1941 to 1961. The football team won a conference championship in 1950. The Buffs were members of the Missouri Valley Conference from 1972 to 1985.

== Varsity sports ==
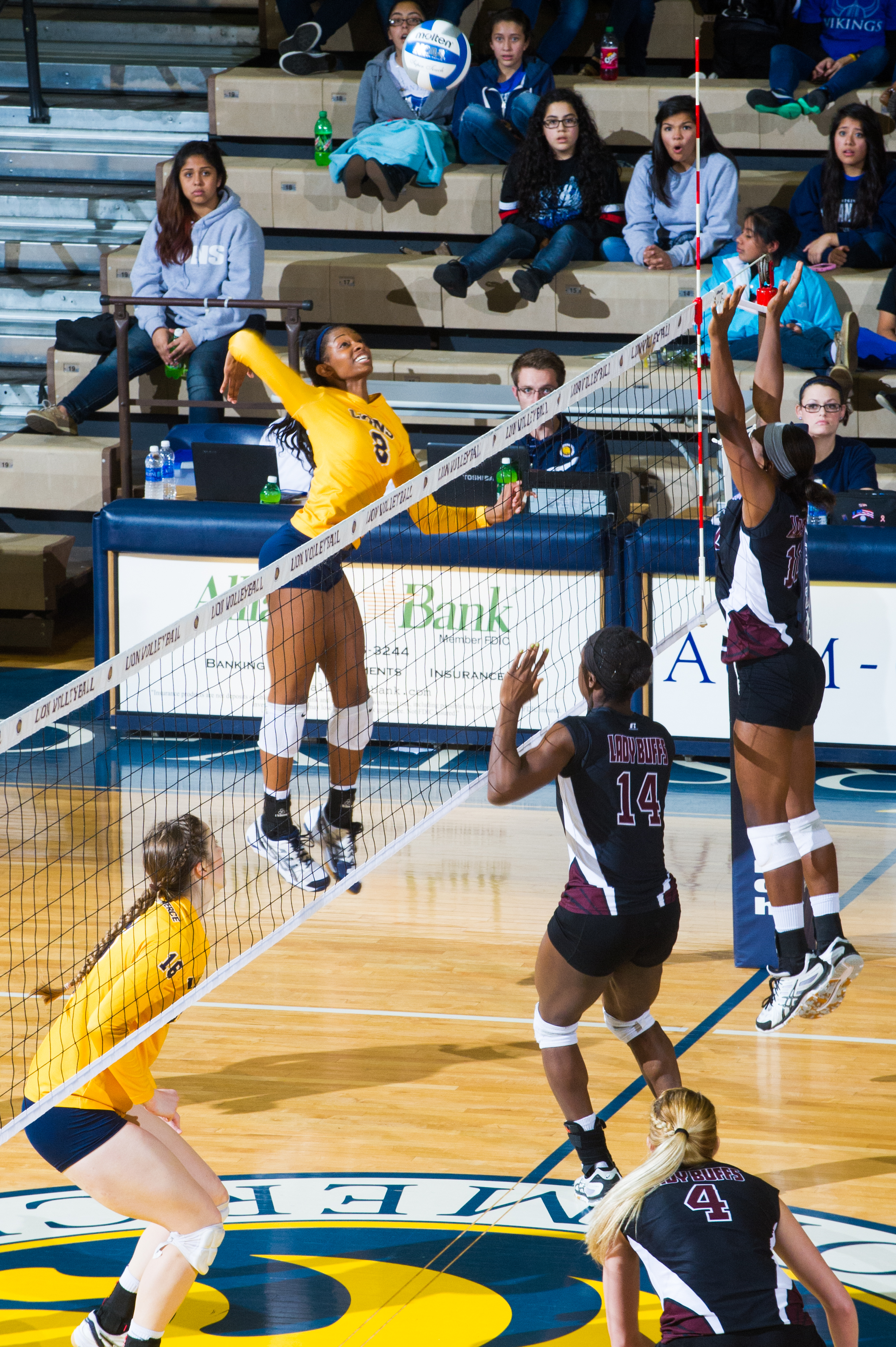
The Lady Buffs women's volleyball team in action against the Texas A&M–Commerce Lions in 2013

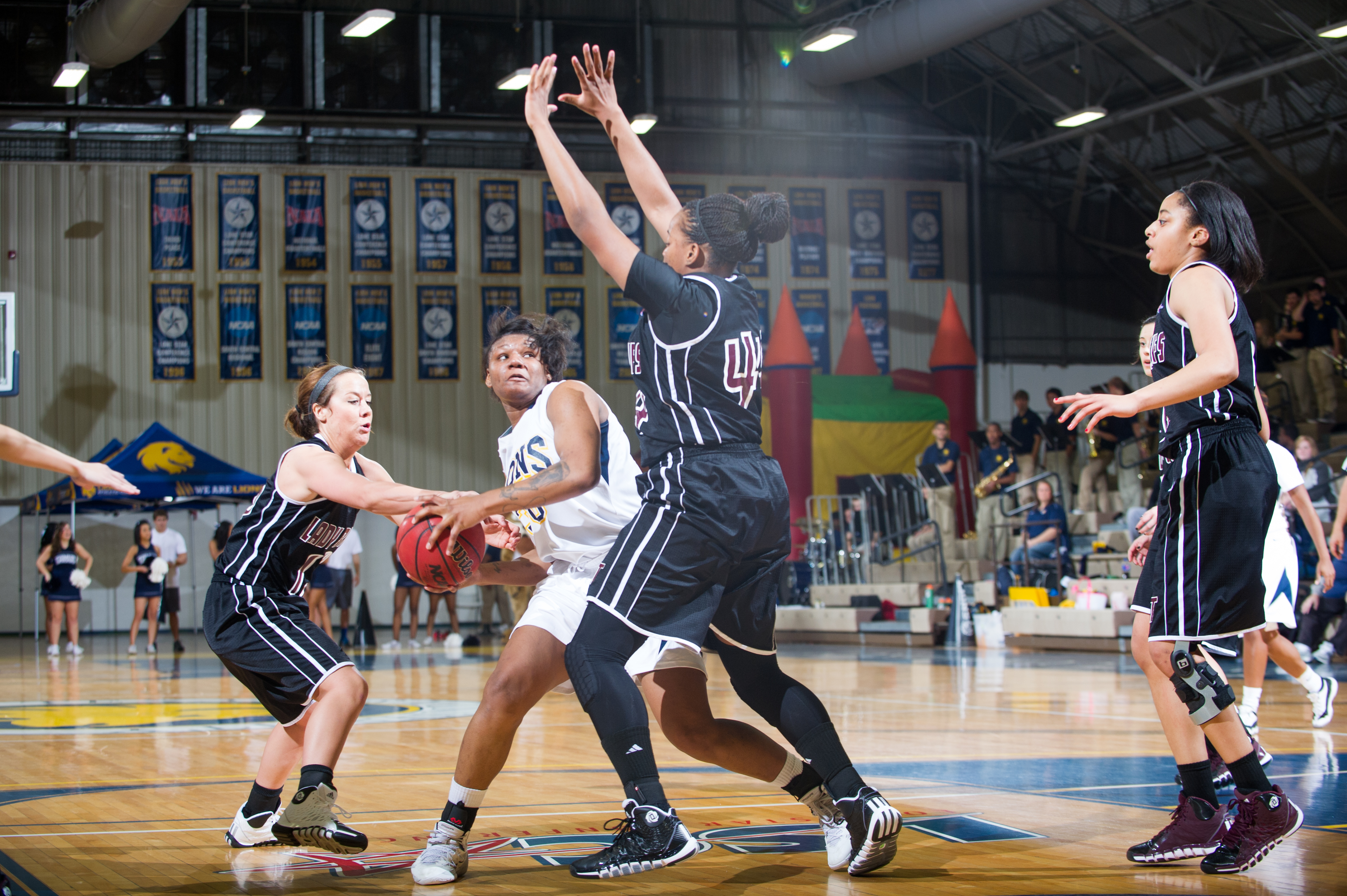
The Lady Buffs women's basketball team in action against Texas A&M–Commerce in 2014

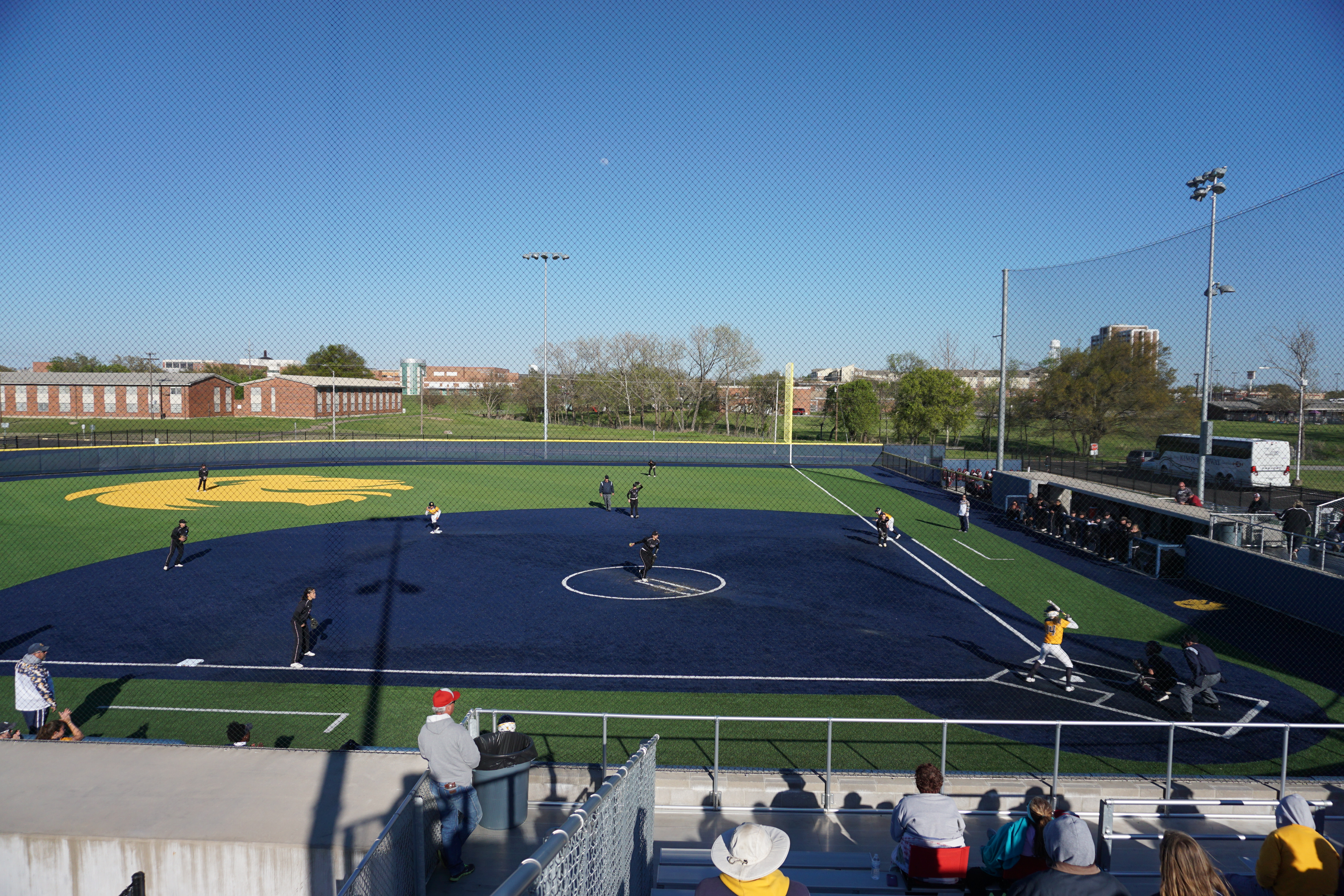
The Lady Buffs softball team in action against Texas A&M–Commerce in 2016

Men's sports

- Baseball
- Basketball
- Cross Country
- Football
- Golf
- Soccer
- Track & Field

Women's sports

- Basketball
- Cross Country
- Golf
- Soccer
- Softball
- Track & Field
- Volleyball

== National championships ==
=== Team ===
Sport	Association	Division	Year	Opponent/Runner-up	Score/Points
Women's volleyball	NCAA	Division II	1990	North Dakota State	3–0
Women's volleyball	NCAA	Division II	1991	Portland State	3–0
Women's volleyball	NCAA	Division II	1997	Barry	3–2
Women's volleyball	NCAA	Division II	2022	Concordia-St Paul	3–1
Softball	NCAA	Division II	2014	Valdosta State	3–2
Softball	NCAA	Division II	2021	Biola	0–5 / 7–4 / 4–1
Women's Outdoor Track & Field	NCAA	Division II	2017	Grand Valley State	64–44
Women's Outdoor Track & Field	NCAA	Division II	2022	Grand Valley State	77–64
Women's Outdoor Track & Field	NCAA	Division II	2026	Pittsburg State	64–63.2
Women's Indoor Track & Field	NCAA	Division II	2018	Western Colorado	53–40

== Individual teams ==
=== Football ===
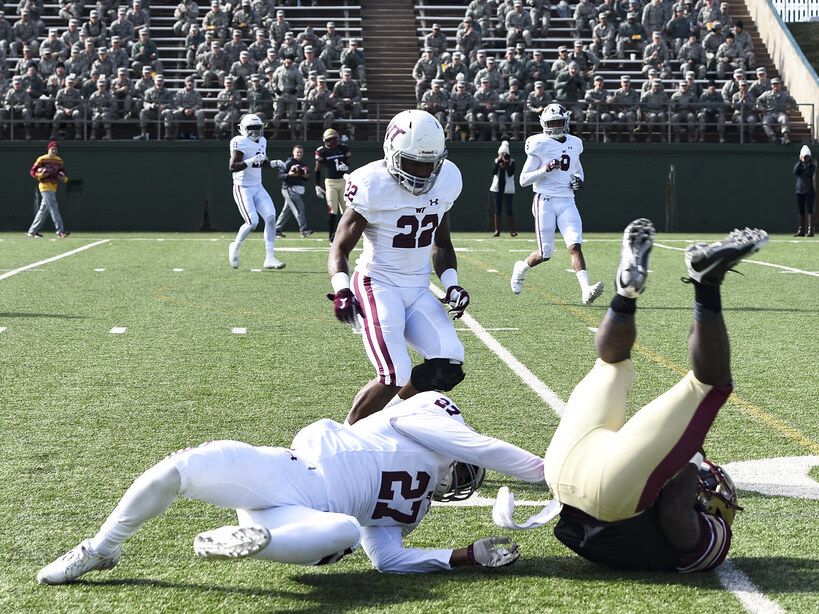
A Buffaloes football player brings down a Midwestern State receiver during a game in 2018.

The football team plays its home games at Bain–Schaeffer Buffalo Stadium, a newly built, on-campus stadium. Previously, WT played at Kimbrough Memorial Stadium. The Buffs play rival Eastern New Mexico University each fall for the Wagon Wheel trophy, and rival Midwestern State University for the Highway 287 Challenge Cup.

==== Sun Bowl champions ====
1949, 1962

==== Tangerine (Citrus Bowl) champions ====
1957

==== Pasadena Bowl champions ====
1967

==== Kanza Bowl champions ====
2009, 2011

==== NCAA DII playoffs ====
National Semifinals: 2012

=== Basketball ===
The Buff and Lady Buff basketball teams play in the First United Bank Center, a 5,800 seat multi-purpose arena in Canyon, Texas. It was built in 2002. It is the home of the Buffaloes basketball teams. The traditional rival is Eastern New Mexico University, but newer rivalries with Midwestern State University and The University of Texas of the Permian Basin have emerged in recent years. A strong tradition of basketball exists at West Texas A&M, dating back to the days of Maurice Cheeks and even as far back as the 1930s and 1940s. The 1954–55 season saw the Buffs make their only NCAA Division I tournament, though they would lose to eventual national champion San Francisco University. In 2018–19, WT had both the men's and women's teams host a regional tournament.

Men's Head Coach	Overall Record	Postseason Record	Tenure	Women's Head Coach	Overall Record	Postseason Record	Tenure
Tom Brown	285–74	39–12	2014–present	Josh Prock	83–47	4–6	2022–present
Rick Cooper	391–193	28–25	1993–2013	Kristen Mattio	154–35	18–7	2016–2021
Jeff Morgan	17–10	0–0	1992	Mark Kellogg	62–6	14–2	2013–2015
Mark Adams	108–40	10–6	1987–1991	Krista Gerlich	168–53	19–9	2006–2012
Gary Moss	47–40	0–2	1984–1986	Bob Schneider	585–163	53–33	1981–2005
Ken Edwards	68–97	2–4	1978–1983	Gary Mooring	8–14	0–0	1980
Ron Ekker	65–70	3–1	1973–1977				
Dennis Wailing	83–66	0–1	1967–1972				
Jimmy Viramontes	38–53	0–0	1963–1966				
Metz LaFollete	33–54	0–0	1959–1962				
Borden Price	9–31	0–0	1957–1958				
Gus Miller	197–137	7–8	1942–1956				
Al Baggett	174–64	7–8	1934–1941				
Carl York	7–12	0–0	1933				
Sam Burton	192–40	3–3	1921–1932				
Wayne McCorkle	8–2	0–0	1920				

From the WTAMU Record Book:

==== Men's basketball postseason ====
Runner-up
2021
Final Four
2018, 2021, 2024
Elite Eight
1998, 2018, 2019, 2021, 2024
Sweet Sixteen
1998, 2017, 2018, 2019, 2021, 2023, 2024
Second Round
1994, 1998, 2001, 2017, 2018, 2019, 2021, 2022
2023, 2024
NCAA First Round
1955, 1987, 1990, 1991, 1994, 1998, 1999, 2001
2003, 2006, 2007, 2008, 2011, 2012, 2017, 2018
2019, 2020, 2021, 2022, 2023, 2024, 2025
NIT First Round
1942, 1969, 1980
NAIB Tournament
Third Place: 1941
Second Round: 1938, 1940, 1941, 1945, 1946, 1952
First Round: 1939, 1950
LSC Tournament Champions
1990, 1991, 1994, 2018, 2019, 2020, 2021, 2022
2023
LSC Regular Season Champions
1991, 1994, 2001, 2003, 2006, 2018, 2019, 2020
2023, 2024
LSC Division Champions
1998, 1999, 2000, 2007, 2008, 2020, 2023, 2024
BIAA Regular Season Champions
1942, 1943, 1952, 1955

==== Women's basketball postseason ====
Runner Up
1988, 2014
Final Four
1988, 2014
Elite Eight
1987, 1988, 1989, 1990, 1991, 1992, 1997, 2009
2014, 2015, 2017, 2022
Sweet Sixteen
1987, 1988, 1989, 1990, 1991, 1992, 1996, 1997
2009, 2014, 2015, 2016, 2017, 2018, 2022
Second Round
1987, 1988, 1989, 1990, 1991, 1992, 1995, 1996
1997, 1999, 2004, 2006, 2007, 2009, 2010, 2014
2015, 2016, 2017, 2018, 2019, 2022, 2025
First Round
1987, 1988, 1989, 1990, 1991, 1992, 1995, 1996
1997, 1999, 2000, 2004, 2005, 2006, 2007, 2008
2009, 2010, 2012, 2014, 2015, 2016, 2017, 2018
2019, 2022, 2023, 2025, 2026
WNIT First Round
1985, 1986
AIAW First Round
1982
LSC Tournament Champions
1987, 1988, 1989, 1990, 1991, 1995, 1997, 2014
2015, 2018, 2019, 2022
LSC Regular Season Champions
1987, 1988, 1989, 1990, 1991, 1995, 1997, 2006
2008, 2009, 2010, 2014, 2015, 2016, 2018, 2019
2022
LSC Division Champions
1999, 2004, 2006, 2007, 2008, 2009, 2010, 2020

=== Volleyball ===
The Lady Buff volleyball team is a four-time NCAA Division II champion, winning the title in 1990, 1991, 1997, and most recently in 2022. The Lady Buffs holding one of the best home winning records in any level of competitive volleyball, which currently sits at 523–83 (495–49 at the D2 level). The team plays its home matches at Britkare Court at the WTAMU Fieldhouse aka “The Box.”

Coach	Record	Tenure
Terry Gamble	0–0	2025–present
Brittany Harry	26–5	2024
Kendra Potts	124–24	2019–2023
Jason Skoch	298–95	2009–2018
Tony Graystone	315–61	1999–2008
Debbie Hendricks	159–47	1993–1998
Jim Giacomazzi	66–13	1991–1992
Kim Hudson	127–25	1987–1990
Carmen Pennick	65–104	1983–1986
Gary Abramson	22–2	1982
Bobbie Cox	38–50–2	1980–1981

National Champions
1990, 1991, 1997, 2022
Runner-Up
2009, 2023
Third Place
1992
National Semi-Finals
1990, 1991, 1992, 1997, 1999, 2006, 2007, 2009
2013, 2022, 2023
National Quarterfinals
1989, 1990, 1991, 1992, 1997, 1999, 2000, 2002
2006, 2007, 2009, 2012, 2013, 2021, 2022, 2023
Regional Finals
1989, 1990, 1991, 1992, 1995, 1997, 1999, 2000
2002, 2006, 2009, 2012, 2013, 2017, 2021, 2022
2023
Regional Semi-Finals
1988, 1989, 1990, 1991, 1992, 1994, 1995, 1996
1997, 1998, 1999, 2000, 2001, 2002, 2006, 2008
2009, 2011, 2012, 2013, 2014, 2017, 2021, 2022
2023, 2024
Post-Season Appearances
1988, 1989, 1990, 1991, 1992, 1994, 1995, 1996
1997, 1998, 1999, 2000, 2001, 2002, 2003, 2005
2006, 2007, 2008, 2009, 2010, 2011, 2012, 2013
2014, 2017, 2019, 2021, 2022, 2023, 2024
LSC Tournament Champions
2012, 2013, 2021, 2022, 2023
LSC Regular Season Champions
1988, 1989, 1990, 1995, 1996, 1997, 1999, 2000
2001, 2002, 2003, 2006, 2007, 2008, 2009, 2010
2011, 2013, 2014, 2022, 2023, 2024
LSC South Champions
1997, 1998, 1999, 2000, 2001, 2002, 2003, 2006

=== Cross country ===
The Buffaloes and the Lady Buffs are one of the few Division II institutions that has an on campus cross country course, known as "The Range."

The Buffaloes have won the Missouri Valley Conference Championship in 1977, and 1979, and the Lone Star Conference Championship in 2013, 2014, 2015, 2016, 2017, 2018, 2019, and 2020. The men have had individual champions in the MVC in 1977 (Joseph Kemei), 1978 (Johnson Bett), 1979 (Johnson Bett), and 1985 (Carlos Ybarra) and in the LSC in 2013 (Dylan Doss), 2015 (Geoffrey Kipchumba), 2016 (Geoffrey Kipchumba), and 2017 (Owen Hind). The men have qualified for the national championships every year since 2013, and had a program best 11th-place finish in 2014. The Buffaloes have had 3 NCAA DII All-Americans, Geoffrey Kipchumba(2015,2016), Owen Hind (2017), and Briggs Wittlake (2018). Ezekiel Kipchichir won the 2019 South Central Region meet.

The Lady Buffs have won the Lone Star Conference Championship in 2012 and 2013. The women have had individual champions in 2012 and 2014.

=== Track & Field ===
West Texas A&M Women's Outdoor Track & Field won the 2017 and 2022 National Championships defeating Grand Valley State each time in three day events. The Women's Indoor Track & Field team won the 2018 National Championship.

=== Baseball ===
Coach	Record	Tenure
Cory Hall	31–21	2025–present
Matt Vanderburg	505–288	2009–2024
Mark Jones	180–290	2000–2008
Todd Howey	148–115	1995–1999
Mike Marshall	8–48	1994

Regional Participant
2014, 2015, 2016, 2017, 2018, 2019, 2021, 2024
LSC Tournament Champions
2016, 2017, 2019
LSC Regular Season Champions
2014, 2018, 2021

=== Softball ===
The West Texas A&M Lady Buffs softball team won the National Championship in 2014 defeating Valdosta State. in 2021, the Lady Buffs won their second title, defeating Biola University 2 games to 1.

Coach	Record	Tenure
Michael Mook	242-61	2020–present
Candace Abrams	72–28	2018–2019
Kevin Blackowski	467–236	2006–2017

National Champions
2014, 2021
College World Series
2014, 2016, 2021, 2026
Super Regionals
2011, 2014, 2016, 2021, 2023, 2025, 2026
Regional Participant
2010, 2011, 2013, 2014, 2015, 2016, 2017, 2018
2019, 2021, 2023, 2024, 2025, 2026
LSC Tournament Champions
2011, 2015, 2016, 2017, 2021, 2024
LSC Tournament Appearances
2009, 2010, 2011, 2012, 2013, 2014, 2015, 2016
2017, 2018, 2019, 2021, 2022, 2023, 2024, 2025, 2026
LSC Regular Season Champions
2011, 2014, 2015, 2016, 2024, 2026
LSC South Division Champions
2010

== Notable alumni ==
- Maurice Cheeks - Hall of Fame NBA basketball player and coach
- Joe Fortenberry — winner of the first tournament of Basketball at the 1936 Summer Olympics
- Qua Grant - basketball player in the Israeli Basketball Premier League
- Mercury Morris - former NFL running back for the Miami Dolphins
- David Tameilau — plays rugby for the United States national rugby union team
- Duane Thomas - former NFL running back for the Dallas Cowboys

In addition to the above, the football program produced several alumni who went on to notable careers in professional wrestling:

- Tully Blanchard – member of the WWE Hall of Fame as part of the Four Horsemen stable
- Bobby Duncum Sr.
- Manny Fernandez
- Dory Funk Jr. – member of the WWE Hall of Fame
- Terry Funk – brother of Dory Jr. and also a member of the WWE Hall of Fame; also a pioneer of the hardcore style
- Frank Goodish, better known as Bruiser Brody –WWE Hall of Fame (Legacy Wing 2019) one of the industry's most famous brawlers
- Stan Hansen – member of the WWE Hall of Fame
- Virgil Runnels, better known as Dusty Rhodes – member of the WWE Hall of Fame (also played baseball for the then-West Texas State)
- Merced Solis, better known as Tito Santana – member of the WWE Hall of Fame
