= NAIA women's beach volleyball invitational =

Annual college beach volleyball tournament

National Association of Intercollegiate Athletics
- Sport: College beach volleyball
- Founded: 2022
- Country: United States
- Most recent champion: Southern Oregon (1st)
- Most titles: Vanguard (2)
- Website: NAIA.com

The NAIA women's beach volleyball invitational is an annual invitational tournament played to determine the national champion of women's collegiate beach volleyball amongst members of the National Association of Intercollegiate Athletics. The tournament is officially called an "invitational" rather than a "championship" because women's beach volleyball has not yet met the NAIA's requirements to be considered a varsity or championship sport.

The inaugural tournament was held in 2022.

The reigning national champions are Southern Oregon, who won its first invitational title in 2026.

== Results ==
NAIA women's volleyball championship
Year	Site	Championship match		
Year	Site	Champion	Games	Runner-up
2022; Details	(Florida); Panama City Beach, FL	Corban	3–2	Vanguard
2023	(Florida); Panama City Beach, FL	Vanguard	3–1	Corban
2024	(Tennessee); Greeneville, TN	Vanguard (2)	3–2	OUAZ
2025	(Tennessee); Greeneville, TN	OUAZ	3–0	Corban
2026	(Arizona); Mesa, AZ	Southern Oregon	3–2	OUAZ
2027	(Arizona); Mesa, AZ			

== Champions ==
Team	Titles	Years
Vanguard	2	2023, 2024
Southern Oregon	1	2026
OUAZ	1	2025
Corban	1	2022

== See also ==
- NCAA beach volleyball championship
- NAIA women's volleyball championship
