= NAIA men's volleyball championship =

Annual college tournament

- Sport: College volleyball
- Founded: 2019
- Country: United States
- Most recent champion: Park (MO) (1st)
- Most titles: Grand View (2)
- Website: NAIA.com

The NAIA Men's Volleyball Championship is an annual tournament hosted by the National Association of Intercollegiate Athletics to determine the national champion of collegiate men's volleyball among its members in the United States.

The inaugural championship was held in 2019.

Grand View have been the most successful program, with two titles.

The defending champions are Park (MO), who won their first national title in 2026.

== Results ==
NAIA men's volleyball championship
Year	Site	Championship match			Tournament MVP
Year	Site	Champion	Games	Runner-up	Tournament MVP
2019; Details	Des Moines, Iowa	Benedictine Mesa	3–0	Aquinas (MI)	Logan Adcock (Benedictine Mesa)
2020	Cancelled due to the COVID-19 pandemic				
2021; Details	Des Moines, Iowa	Grand View	3–0	Benedictine Mesa	Felix Chapman (Grand View)
2022; Details	West Des Moines, Iowa	Grand View (2)	3–1	Benedictine Mesa	Francisco Arredondo (Grand View)
2023; Details	West Des Moines, Iowa	Vanguard	3–2	Benedictine Mesa	Kyle Anema (Vanguard)
2024; Details	Cedar Rapids, Iowa	Georgetown (KY)	3–0	The Master's	Krzysztof Kowalski (Georgetown KY)
2025; Details	Cedar Rapids, Iowa	The Master's	3–1	Saint Xavier (IL)	Braden Van Groningen (The Master's)
2026; Details	Cedar Rapids, Iowa	Park (MO)	3–1	Saint Xavier (IL)	Adrian Figueroa (Park (MO))
2027; Details	Cedar Rapids, Iowa				
2028; Details	Cedar Rapids, Iowa				

== Champions ==
=== Active NAIA programs ===
Team	Titles	Years
Grand View	2	2021, 2022
Park (MO)	1	2026
The Master's	1	2025
Georgetown (KY)	1	2024
Benedictine Mesa	1	2019

=== Former NAIA programs ===
Team	Titles	Years
Vanguard	1	2023

== See also ==
- NCAA men's volleyball championships (Divisions I and II, Division III)
- NAIA women's volleyball championship
