= NAIA women's volleyball championship =

Annual college tournament

- Sport: Indoor volleyball
- First season: 1980
- Country: United States and Canada
- Most recent champion: Indiana Wesleyan (3rd)
- Most titles: BYU-Hawaii (10)
- Website: NAIA.org

The NAIA Women's Volleyball National Championship is the annual tournament to determine the national champions of NAIA women's collegiate indoor volleyball in the United States and Canada. It has been held annually since 1980.

The most successful program has been BYU–Hawaii, with ten NAIA national titles. Of active NAIA programs, Columbia College is the most successful, with four national titles.

The current champions are Indiana Wesleyan, who won their third national title in 2025.

== Results ==
NAIA Women's Volleyball Championship
Year	Site	Championship match		
Year	Site	Champion	Games	Runner-up
1980	(Kansas); Pittsburg, KS	Azusa Pacific	3–1 (15-3, 10-15, 15-2, 15-10)	East Texas State
1981	(West Virginia); Athens, WV	Hawaii–Hilo	3–1 (15-9, 15-10, 5-15, 15-8	Southwestern (TX)
1982	(Colorado); Denver, CO	Hawaii–Hilo (2)	3–0 (15-3, 16-14, 15-7)	Texas Wesleyan
1983	(South Carolina); Rock Hill, SC	Hawaii–Hilo (3)	3–0 (15-3, 15-8, 15-2)	St. Mary's (CA)
1984	(Missouri); St. Joseph, MO	Hawaii–Hilo (4)	3–0 (16-14, 15-12, 15-6)	Brigham Young–Hawaii
1985	(Wisconsin); Milwaukee, WI	St. Mary's (CA)	3–0 (15-11, 15-13, 15-3)	Biola
1986	(Texas); Fort Worth, TX	Brigham Young–Hawaii	2–1 (5-15, 15-10, 15-13)	Lewis & Clark
1987	(Wisconsin); Milwaukee, WI	Brigham Young–Hawaii (2)	2–0 (15-3, 15-6)	Western Oregon
1988	(Kansas); Topeka, KS	Hawaii–Hilo (5)	2–0 (15-6, 15-4)	Western Oregon
1989	(Hawaii); Laie, HI	Fresno Pacific	2–0 (15-3, 17-15)	Hawaii Pacific
1990	(Hawaii); Laie, HI	Hawaii Pacific	3–1 (13-15, 15-8, 15-8, 15-5)	Texas Wesleyan
1991	(Kansas); Hays, KS	Brigham Young–Hawaii (3)	3–0 (15-5, 15-2, 15-2)	IUPUI
1992	(California); San Diego, CA	Brigham Young–Hawaii (4)	3–0 (15-8, 15-8, 15-10)	California Baptist
1993	(California); San Diego, CA	Puget Sound	3–0 (15-3, 15-8, 15-11)	Hawaii–Hilo
1994	(Tennessee); Chattanooga, TN	Brigham Young–Hawaii (5)	3–0 (15-5, 15-9, 15-6)	Western Oregon
1995	(California); San Diego, CA	Brigham Young–Hawaii (6)	3–1 (6-15, 15-12, 15-12, 15-5)	Puget Sound
1996	(California); San Diego, CA	Brigham Young–Hawaii (7)	3–0 (15-9, 15-9, 15-10)	Point Loma Nazarene
1997	(Illinois); Kankakee, IL	Brigham Young–Hawaii (8)	3–0 (15-3, 15-7, 15-4)	Biola
1998	(Illinois); Kankakee, IL	Columbia (MO)	3–0 (16-14, 15-5, 15-1)	Northwest Nazarene
1999	(California); Fresno, CA	Columbia (MO) (2)	3–1 (8-15, 16-14, 15-12, 15-7)	Fresno Pacific
2000	(Florida); West Palm Beach, FL	Dickinson State	3–1 (11-15, 15-10, 15-4, 15-13)	Columbia (MO)
2001	(Florida); West Palm Beach, FL	Columbia (MO) (3)	3–0 (30-25, 30-17, 30-14)	National American
2002	(California); San Diego, CA	National American	3–0 (30-22, 30-19, 30-25)	Houston Baptist
2003	(California); San Diego, CA	Fresno Pacific (2)	3–1 (30-28, 30-25, 25-30, 30-20)	Columbia (MO)
2004	(California); San Diego, CA	California Baptist	3–1 (30-23, 30-27, 32-34, 30-16)	Concordia Irvine
2005	(California); San Diego, CA	California Baptist (2)	3–0 (30-26, 31-29, 30-28)	Columbia (MO)
2006	(Missouri); Columbia, MO	National American (2)	3–1 (31-33, 30-25, 33-31, 30-22)	Fresno Pacific
2007	(Missouri); Columbia, MO	Fresno Pacific (3)	3–1 (30-28, 25-30, 30-25, 34-32)	California Baptist
2008	(Iowa); Sioux City, IA	Fresno Pacific (4)	3–2 (24-26, 27-29, 25-21, 25-15, 15-11)	Concordia Irvine
2009	(Iowa); Sioux City, IA	Fresno Pacific (5)	3–0 (25-15, 25-18, 25-12)	Georgetown
2010	(Iowa); Sioux City, IA	Fresno Pacific (6)	3–0 (25-20, 25-18, 25-19)	Columbia (MO)
2011	(Iowa); Sioux City, IA	Texas–Brownsville	3–1 (25-20, 20-25, 25-19, 25-20)	Concordia Irvine
2012	(Iowa); Sioux City, IA	Concordia Irvine	3–1 (25-19, 20-25, 25-21, 25-19)	Columbia (MO)
2013	(Iowa); Sioux City, IA	Texas–Brownsville (2)	3–0 (27-25, 27-25, 25-22)	Biola
2014	(Iowa); Sioux City, IA	Park	3–0 (25-23, 25-19, 25-16)	Texas–Brownsville
2015	(Iowa); Sioux City, IA	Columbia (MO) (4)	3–0 (25-23, 25-23, 25-19)	Missouri Baptist
2016	(Iowa); Sioux City, IA	Hastings	3–2 (23-25, 15-25, 25-16, 25-22, 15-6)	Dordt
2017	(Iowa); Sioux City, IA	Lindsey Wilson	3–1 (25-16, 25-23, 20-25, 25-14)	Dordt
2018	(Iowa); Sioux City, IA	Park (2)	3–2 (19-25, 25-15, 17-25, 25-20, 16-14)	Columbia (MO)
2019	(Iowa); Sioux City, IA	Marian	3–0 (25–20, 25–20, 25–21)	Westmont
2020	(Iowa); Sioux City, IA	Missouri Baptist	3–2 (23-25, 25-14, 24-26, 25-19, 15-12)	Midland
2021	(Iowa); Sioux City, IA	Missouri Baptist (2)	3–2 (25-18, 20-25, 25-15, 14-25, 15-8)	Park
2022	(Iowa); Sioux City, IA	Jamestown	3–2 (25-21, 21-25, 25-27, 25-22, 15-13)	Corban
2023	(Iowa); Sioux City, IA	Indiana Wesleyan	3–2 (20-25, 25-20, 13-25, 25-17, 15-10)	Northwestern (IA)
2024	(Iowa); Sioux City, IA	Indiana Wesleyan (2)	3–2 (25-22, 16-25, 13-25, 25-18, 16-14)	Bellevue (NE)
2025	(Iowa); Sioux City, IA	Indiana Wesleyan (3)	3–1 (25-23, 23-25, 25-18, 25-19)	Northwestern (IA)

== Champions ==
=== Active NAIA programs ===
Team	Titles	Years
Columbia (MO)	4	1998, 1999, 2001, 2015
Indiana Wesleyan	3	2023, 2024, 2025
Missouri Baptist	2	2020, 2021
Park (MO)	2	2014, 2018
Jamestown	1	2022
Marian (IN)	1	2019
Dickinson State	1	2000

=== Former NAIA programs ===
Team	Titles	Years
BYU Hawaii	8	1985, 1986, 1987, 1991, 1992, 1994, 1995, 1996, 1997
Fresno Pacific	6	1989, 2003, 2007, 2008, 2009, 2010
Hawaii–Hilo	5	1981, 1982, 1983, 1984, 1988
California Baptist	2	2004, 2005
National American (SD)	2	2002, 2006
Texas–Brownsville	2	2011, 2013

== See also ==
- NAIA men's volleyball championship
- NCAA women's volleyball tournaments (Division I, Division II, Division III)
