= Tom Brown (basketball) =

American basketball coach

Current position
- Title: Head coach
- Team: West Texas A&M
- Conference: Lone Star Conference

Playing career
- 1988–1992: Winona State

Coaching career (HC unless noted)
- 1994–1998: Gilmanton HS
- 1998–2014: Winona State (associate HC)
- 2014–present: West Texas A&M

Head coaching record
- Overall: 311–86 (.783)
- Tournaments: 20–8 (NCAA Division II)

Accomplishments and honors

Championships
- 5 LSC regular season (2018–2020, 2023, 2024); 6 LSC tournament (2018–2023)

Awards
- 5 LSC Coach of the Year (2018–2020, 2023, 2024)

Tom Brown is an American college basketball coach who is the head coach of the West Texas A&M Buffaloes basketball team.

== Early life and playing career ==
Brown grew up in Woodbury, Minnesota and attended Woodbury High School. He played college basketball at Winona State. Brown finished his career with the Winona State Warriors as the program's all-time leader in steals as well as fifth in scoring and second in assists.

== Coaching career ==
Brown began his coaching career in 1994 as the head coach of Gilmanton High School in Gilmanton, Wisconsin, where he also taught and served as the school's athletic director. He then served as the associate head coach and recruiting coordinator at his alma mater, Winona State, from 1998 to 2014. The Warriors won the NCAA Division II men's basketball tournament in 2006 and 2008 while Brown was on staff.

Brown was hired as the head coach at West Texas A&M on April 16, 2014. He won his 200th game with a 82–72 victory over St. Edward's on January 31, 2022.

== Head coaching record ==
Record table
Season	Team	Overall	Conference	Standing	Postseason
West Texas A&M (Lone Star Conference) (2014–present)
2014–15	West Texas A&M	17–12	7–7		
2015–16	West Texas A&M	21–10	9–5		
2016–17	West Texas A&M	26–9	12–6		NCAA Division II Sweet Sixteen
2017–18	West Texas A&M	32–4	15–3		NCAA Division II Final Four
2018–19	West Texas A&M	34–4	17–1		NCAA Division II Elite Eight
2019–20	West Texas A&M	32–1	21–1		No postseason held
2020–21	West Texas A&M	19–3	10–2		NCAA Division II Runner-up
2021–22	West Texas A&M	28–7	11–5		NCAA Division II Second Round
2022–23	West Texas A&M	27–7	20–2		NCAA Division II Sweet Sixteen
2023–24	West Texas A&M	30–5	20–2		NCAA Division II Final Four
2024–25	West Texas A&M	19–12	13–9		NCAA Division II First Round
2025–26	West Texas A&M	20–11	12–8		
2026–27	West Texas A&M	6–1	0–0		
West Texas A&M:		311–86 (.783)	167–51 (.766)		
Total:		311–86 (.783)			
National champion Postseason invitational champion Conference regular season champion Conference regular season and conference tournament champion Division regular season champion Division regular season and conference tournament champion Conference tournament champion
