= Vanguard Lions =

- University: Vanguard University
- Conference: PacWest; Mountain Pacific Sports Federation (men's volleyball, men's & women's wrestling)
- NCAA: Division II (transitionary)
- Athletic director: Jeff Bussell
- Location: Costa Mesa, California
- Varsity teams: 20
- Basketball arena: Freed Center
- Baseball stadium: Dean Harvey Field
- Softball stadium: VU Softball Field
- Soccer stadium: VU Soccer Complex
- Mascot: Samson the Lion
- Nickname: Lions
- Colors: Navy and gold
- Website: vanguardlions.com
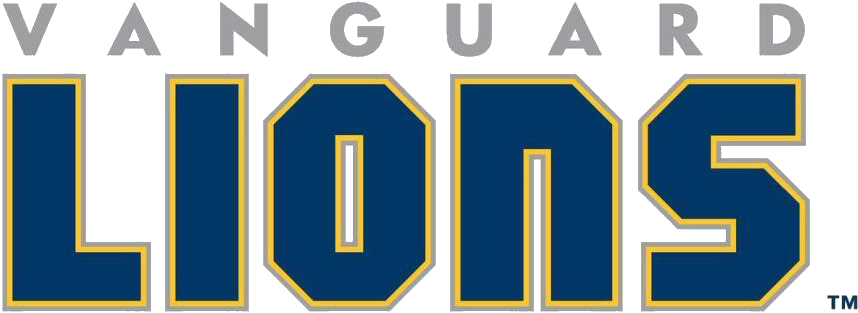

The Vanguard Lions are the athletic teams that represent Vanguard University, located in Costa Mesa, California, in NCAA Division II intercollegiate sports. As of the 2024–25 school year, Vanguard are transitionary NCAA members as they move athletic teams from the National Association of Intercollegiate Athletics.

The Lions are members of the Pacific West Conference (PacWest) for most sports. Of its other programs, men's volleyball, & men's and women's wrestling are associate members of the Mountain Pacific Sports Federation.

== Varsity sports ==
Men's sports	Women's sports
Baseball	Basketball
Basketball	Beach volleyball
Cross country	Cross country
Golf	Golf
Soccer	Soccer
Track and field	Softball
Volleyball	Track and field
Wrestling	Wrestling
	Volleyball

== National championships ==
=== Team ===
Sport	Association	Division	Year	Runner-up	Score
Men's basketball (1)	NAIA	Division I	2014	Emmanuel (GA)	70–65
Women's basketball (1)	NAIA	Division I	2008	Trevecca Nazarene	72–59
Men's volleyball (1)	NAIA	Division I	2023	Benedictine Mesa	3-2 (sets)
Women's beach volleyball (2)	NAIA	Division I	2023 2024	Corban University, Arizona Christian	3-1 (sets), 3-2 (sets)
