= Hawaii–Hilo Vulcans =

Athletics program of the University of Hawaiʻi at Hilo

- University: University of Hawaiʻi at Hilo
- Nickname: Vulcans
- NCAA: Division II
- Conference: PacWest
- Athletic director: Patrick Guillen
- Location: Hilo, Hawaii
- Varsity teams: 12 (5 men's, 7 women's)
- Basketball arena: Afook-Chinen Civic Auditorium
- Baseball stadium: Wong Stadium
- Softball stadium: UHH Softball Field
- Soccer stadium: UHH Soccer Field
- Other venues: UHH Gymnasium (volleyball); UHH Tennis Courts
- Colors: Red and black
- Website: hiloathletics.com
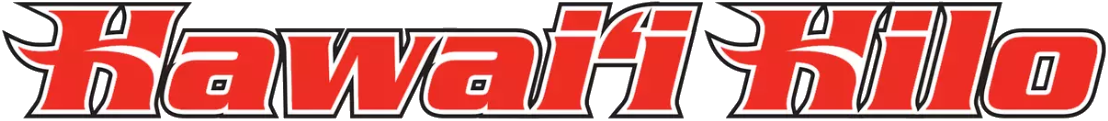

The Hawaii–Hilo Vulcans are the athletics sports teams for the University of Hawaiʻi at Hilo, located in Hilo, Hawaii, in NCAA Division II intercollegiate sports. The Vulcans compete as members of the Pacific West Conference, in 12 varsity sports.

== Varsity sports ==
Hawaii–Hilo sponsors 12 varsity sports, five for men and seven for women.

Men's sports	Women's sports
Baseball	Basketball
Basketball	Cross-Country
Golf	Golf
Soccer	Soccer
Tennis	Softball
	Tennis
	Volleyball

=== Women's volleyball ===
The Vulcans women's volleyball team is the intercollegiate women's volleyball team of the University of Hawaii at Hilo. Established in 1978, the program has achieved two national championships, in 1979 and 1981, while also having success in achieving 12 regular season conference championships.
