= 1981 NCAA Division II women's volleyball tournament =

US collegiate volleyball competition

Tournament information
- Sport: College volleyball
- Location: Riverside, California
- Administrator: NCAA
- Host: UC Riverside
- Teams: 10

Final positions
- Champions: Sacramento State (1st)
- 1st runners-up: Lewis (IL)
- 2nd runners-up: Cal State Northridge

The 1981 NCAA Division II women's volleyball tournament was the first annual NCAA-sponsored tournament to determine the national champions of Division II women's collegiate volleyball in the United States.

Sacramento State defeated Lewis (IL) in straight sets, 3–0 (15–10, 15–6, 15–7), in the final to claim their first national title. The Hornets were coached by Debby Colberg.

== Bracket ==
First Round
UC Davis	15	3	11	15	15
Northern Kentucky	13	15	15	7	12
Lewis (IL)	12	15	15	15
Springfield	15	5	5	2

Second Round
Sacramento State	15	15	15
Mansfield State	4	2	4
Cal State Northridge	15	15	15
UC Davis	4	10	3
UC Riverside	15	15	10	4	15
Lewis (IL)	13	9	15	15	17
Florida Southern	15	15	15
St. Augustine's	7	6	3

Semifinals
Sacramento State	15	15	9	15
Cal State Northridge	13	4	15	8
Lewis (IL)	10	15	11	15	15
Florida Southern	15	12	15	10	10

Championship; Riverside, CA
Sacramento State	15	15	15
Lewis (IL)	10	6	7

== See also ==
- 1981 NCAA Division I women's volleyball tournament
- 1981 NCAA Division III women's volleyball tournament
- 1981 NAIA women's volleyball tournament
- 1981 AIAW Division I women's volleyball tournament (final version)
- 1981 AIAW Division II women's volleyball tournament (final version)
- 1981 AIAW Division III women's volleyball tournament (final version)
