= University of Hawaiʻi at Hilo Botanical Gardens =

Botanical gardens in Hilo, Hawaiʻi, United States

Coordinates: 19°41′59″N 155°04′54″W

University of Hawaii at Hilo Botanical Gardens
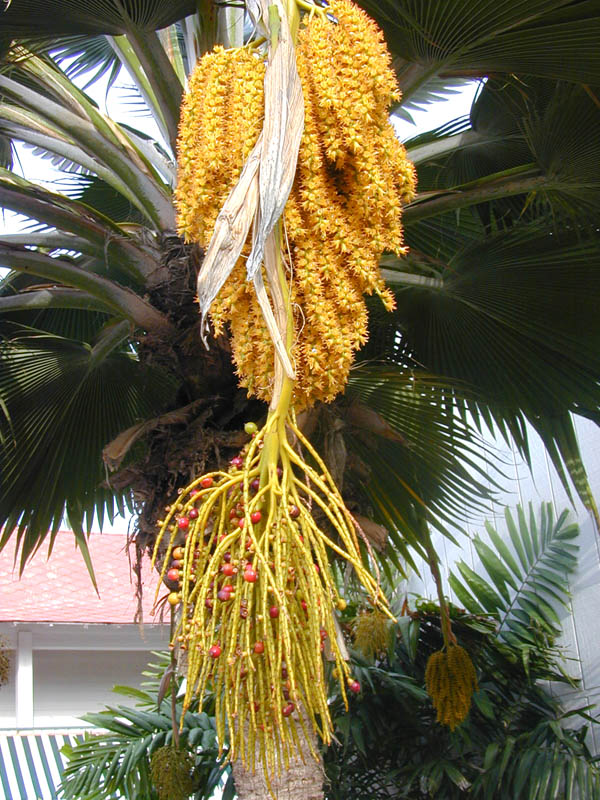
- Pritchardia flowers
- Interactive map of University of Hawaii at Hilo Botanical Gardens
- Website: hilo.hawaii.edu/gardens/

The University of Hawaiʻi at Hilo Botanical Gardens are botanical gardens on the University of Hawaiʻi at Hilo campus, located at 485 W Lanikaula St, Hilo, Hawaiʻi on the island of Hawaiʻi. They are open daily without charge.

The gardens were established by UH-Hilo professor Don Hemmes at some time in the 1980s, after a student said that they had never seen a pine tree before.

The gardens contain one of Hawaiʻi's best cycad collections, with 126 species from Africa, China, North and Central America, and Australia. It also contains an international collection of palm trees, and all five 5 species of Big Island Pritchardia. Since the gardens are located in a windward area of the university campus, they get a substantial amount of rain.

== See also ==
- List of botanical gardens in the United States
