= Hawaii Pacific Sharks =

Athletic teams representing Hawaii Pacific University

- University: Hawaii Pacific University
- NCAA: Division II
- Conference: PacWest
- Athletic director: Dr. Debbie Snell
- Location: Honolulu, Hawaii
- Varsity teams: 15 (6 men's, 9 women's)
- Basketball arena: Neal S. Blaisdell Center
- Baseball stadium: Hans L'Orange Field
- Softball stadium: Howard A. Okita Field
- Soccer stadium: Atherton Field
- Other venues: Clarence T. C. Ching Gymnasium
- Nickname: Sharks
- Colors: Teal blue and white
- Website: hpusharks.com

The Hawaii Pacific Sharks are the 13 varsity athletic teams that represent Hawaii Pacific University, located in Honolulu, Hawaii, in NCAA Division II intercollegiate sports. The Sharks compete as members of the Pacific West Conference. Hawaii Pacific University's first venture into intercollegiate athletics came with the formation of the men's basketball team. The university previously competed in the NAIA before joining the NCAA in the mid-1990s.

On August 1, 2014, HPU athletics announced that they had changed their name from the Sea Warriors to the Sharks as part of a fundraising effort. As part of the new logo rollout, then-HPU Executive Athletics Director Vince Baldemor promised to secure 1,000 memberships in the HPU "Sharks Club" within the first three months. The program was a major failure with membership failing to exceed 300 after two years. Baldemor was relieved as athletics director.

== History ==
Men's basketball won the 1993 NAIA Division I men's basketball tournament with an 88–83 victory over Oklahoma Baptist University.

The school's most successful athletics program has been its women's volleyball team, which has won three national championships, one NAIA national volleyball championship in 1990 and two NCAA Women's DII Volleyball Championships in 1998 and 2000.

The Lady Sharks Softball team won the NCAA Division II Women's College World Series on May 31, 2010 with a come-from-behind 4–3 win over Valdosta State University.

Although not recognized as an official sport by the athletic department, HPU has a Division II cheerleading and dance team, with HPU Large Coed, Small Coed, All Girl and Dance National Championship Titles. Including eight consecutive (Non-NCAA) National Championship from 2003 to 2010.

On November 3, 2025, the men's basketball team defeated Division I Boise State 79–78 in the Broncos' season opener.

== Varsity sports ==
Men's sports	Women's sports
Baseball	Acrobatics and tumbling
Basketball	Basketball
Cross country	Beach volleyball
Golf	Cross country
Soccer	Golf
Tennis	Soccer
	Softball
	Tennis
	Volleyball

== National championships ==
=== Team ===
Sport	Association	Division	Year	Opponent/Runner-up	Score/Points
Basketball (1)	NAIA	Division I	1993	Oklahoma Baptist	88–83
Softball (1)	NCAA	Division II	2010	Valdosta State	4–3 (5 inn.)
Men's Tennis (1)	NCAA	Division II	2016	Saint Leo	5–3
Women's volleyball (3)	NAIA	Division I	1990	Texas Wesleyan	3–1
Women's volleyball (3)	NCAA	Division II	1998	North Dakota State	3–1
Women's volleyball (3)	NCAA	Division II	2000	Augustana (SD)	3–0
