= 1982 NCAA Division II women's volleyball tournament =

American collegiate volleyball tournament

Tournament information
- Sport: College volleyball
- Location: Nothridge, California
- Administrator: NCAA
- Host: Cal State Northridge
- Teams: 16

Final positions
- Champions: UC Riverside (1st title)
- Runner-up: Cal State Northridge (1st title game)

The 1982 NCAA Division II women's volleyball tournament was the second annual NCAA-sponsored tournament to determine the national champions of Division II women's collegiate volleyball in the United States.

UC Riverside defeated Cal State Northridge in straight sets, 3–0 (15–11, 15–12, 15–5), in the final to claim the Highlanders' first NCAA Division II national title.

UC Riverside were coached by Sue Gozansky.

== Qualifying ==
The tournament field expanded for the first time, increasing from ten to sixteen teams.

Ten teams made their debut in the NCAA Division II tournament: Angelo State, Chapman, C.W. Post, Edinboro State, Ferris State, Florida International, Nebraska–Omaha, North Dakota State, Northern Colorado, and Portland State.

== Bracket ==
First Round; Campus sites
UC Riverside	15	15	15
Northern Colorado	7	6	7
UC Davis	15	15	15	15
Chapman	8	6	17	8
Angelo State	3	11	15	6
Florida Southern	15	15	11	15
Florida International	15	5	15	15	4
Portland State	11	15	12	17	15
Lewis (IL)	13	8	9
Sacramento State	15	15	15
Ferris State	4	15	15	15
Nebraska–Omaha	15	13	9	11
Edinboro State	15	3	8	15	6
North Dakota State	12	15	15	12	15
Cal State Northridge	15	15	15
C.W. Post	0	10	9

Second Round; Campus sites
UC Riverside	15	14	15	15
UC Davis	12	16	5	10
Florida Southern	8	9	8
Portland State	15	15	15
Sacramento State	15	15	15
Ferris State	11	6	13
North Dakota State	13	10	13
Cal State Northridge	15	15	15

Semifinals; Campus sites
UC Riverside	15	15	15
Portland State	13	7	9
Sacramento State	15	10	11	15	6
Cal State Northridge	13	15	15	10	15

Championship; Northridge, CA
UC Riverside	15	15	15
Cal State Northridge	11	12	5
Third place game Northridge, CA
Portland State	15	16	15
Sacramento State	7	14	10

== All-tournament team ==
- Debbie Bush, UC Riverside
- Star Clark, UC Riverside
- Kim Holder, UC Riverside
- Lynda Johnson, Portland State
- Karen Kootnekoff, Portland State
- Linda Wilson, Cal State Northridge

== See also ==
- 1982 NCAA Division I women's volleyball tournament
- 1982 NCAA Division III women's volleyball tournament
- 1982 NAIA women's volleyball tournament
