= BYU–Hawaii Seasiders =

- University: Brigham Young University–Hawaii
- Nickname: Seasiders
- NCAA: Division II
- Conference: Pacific West Conference
- Athletic director: Ken Wagner
- Location: Laie, Hawaii
- Varsity teams: 11
- Basketball arena: George Q. Cannon Activities Center
- Softball stadium: BYUH Softball Field
- Soccer stadium: BYUH Soccer Field
- Other venues: BYUH Tennis Courts
- Colors: Crimson and gold
- Website: byuhawaiisports.com

Team NCAA championships
- 11

Individual and relay NCAA champions
- 2

The BYU–Hawaii Seasiders (also Brigham Young–Hawaii Seasiders and BYUH Seasiders) were the 11 varsity athletic teams that represented Brigham Young University–Hawaii, located in Laie, Hawaii, in NCAA Division II intercollegiate sports. The Seasiders competed as members of the Pacific West Conference before dropping their athletic program after the 2016–17 season.

== History ==
The school won eleven NCAA national championships: two in women's volleyball and nine tennis championships (two men's and seven women's). In its early days, BYU–H also won a National Rugby Championship in 1967, as declared by the Los Angeles Rugby Union. Basketball and volleyball games were held in the George Q. Cannon Activities Center. The campus also holds nine tennis courts, an outdoor swimming pool, and soccer and softball fields. Most conference home games in volleyball and women's basketball, as well as additional home games in men's basketball were broadcast live around the world on BYUtv Sports. The Seasiders ended their athletic programs after the 2016–17 season.

== Varsity sports ==
Men's sports	Women's sports
Basketball	Basketball
Cross country	Cross country
Golf	Soccer
Soccer	Softball
Tennis	Tennis
	Volleyball
* Finished with 11 Varsity Sports

== National championships ==
=== Team ===
Sport	Association	Division	Year	Opponent/Runner-up	Score/Points
Men's tennis (2)	NCAA	Division II	2002	Drury	5–4
Men's tennis (2)	NCAA	Division II	2003	Hawaii Pacific	5–4
Women's tennis (9)	NAIA (2)	Single	1997	Auburn Montgomery	46–30
Women's tennis (9)	NAIA (2)	Single	1998	Auburn Montgomery	39–31
Women's tennis (9)	NCAA (7)	Division II	1999	Armstrong Atlantic State	5–1
Women's tennis (9)	NCAA (7)	Division II	2000	Lynn	5–0
Women's tennis (9)	NCAA (7)	Division II	2002	Armstrong Atlantic State	5–1
Women's tennis (9)	NCAA (7)	Division II	2003	Barry	5–3
Women's tennis (9)	NCAA (7)	Division II	2004	Barry	5–1
Women's tennis (9)	NCAA (7)	Division II	2006	Armstrong Atlantic State	5–3
Women's tennis (9)	NCAA (7)	Division II	2007	West Florida	5–0
Women's volleyball (10)	NAIA (8)	Single	1986	Lewis & Clark	2–1
Women's volleyball (10)	NAIA (8)	Single	1987	Western Oregon	2–0
Women's volleyball (10)	NAIA (8)	Single	1991	IUPUI	3–0
Women's volleyball (10)	NAIA (8)	Single	1992	California Baptist	3–0
Women's volleyball (10)	NAIA (8)	Single	1994	Western Oregon	3–0
Women's volleyball (10)	NAIA (8)	Single	1995	Puget Sound	3–1
Women's volleyball (10)	NAIA (8)	Single	1996	Point Loma Nazarene	3–0
Women's volleyball (10)	NAIA (8)	Single	1997	Biola	3–0
Women's volleyball (10)	NCAA (2)	Division II	1999	Tampa	3–0
Women's volleyball (10)	NCAA (2)	Division II	2002	Truman State	3–0
