= 1982 NCAA Division I women's volleyball tournament =

Volleyball competition

1982 NCAA women's Division I volleyball tournament
- Champions: Hawaiʻi (1st NCAA (2nd national) title)
- Runner-up: Southern California (2nd NCAA (5th national) title match)
- Semifinalists: Stanford (1st Final Four); San Diego State (2nd Final Four)
- Winning coach: Dave Shoji (1st title)
- Final Four All-Tournament Team: Tracy Clark (Southern California); Kimberly Ruddins (Southern California); Deitre Collins (Hawaiʻi); Lisa Strand (Hawaiʻi); Kim Oden (Stanford); Mary Holland (San Diego State)

The 1982 NCAA Division I women's volleyball tournament was the second year of the NCAA Women's Volleyball Championship for Division I. In 1982, the tournament participants were expanded from 20 to 28.

The University of Hawaiʻi won the NCAA championship by defeating defending national champion Southern California in five games. Hawaiʻi finished the year at 33–1.

In the consolation match, San Diego State defeated Stanford in five games to claim third place for the second straight year.

== Brackets ==
=== Northwest regional ===
First Round
UCSB	2
San Jose State	3
Arizona State	3
Illinois State	1
Cal Poly	3
Pittsburgh	0

Regional semifinal
Hawaiʻi	3
San Jose State	0
Arizona State	1
Cal Poly	3

Regional final
Hawaiʻi	3
Cal Poly	1

=== South regional ===
First Round
Texas	3
SW Missouri State	1
Pacific	3
North Carolina	0
Arizona	3
Texas A&M	0

Regional semifinal
Stanford	3
Texas	0
Pacific	3
Arizona	1

Regional final
Stanford	3
Pacific	0

=== Mideast regional ===
First Round
Tennessee	3
Northwestern	2
Nebraska	3
Penn State	1
Purdue	3
Rutgers	1

Regional semifinal
Southern California	3
Tennessee	0
Nebraska	2
Purdue	3

Regional final
Southern California	3
Purdue	0

=== West regional ===
First Round
California	3
Pepperdine	0
UCLA	3
Louisville	0
BYU	3
Western Michigan	0

Regional semifinal
San Diego State	3
California	1
UCLA	3
BYU	0

Regional final
San Diego State	3
UCLA	1

== Final Four - Alex G. Spanos Center, Stockton, California ==
Semifinals
Hawaiʻi	3
Stanford	2
Southern California	3
San Diego State	0

Finals
Hawaiʻi	3
Southern California	2
Third place
San Diego State	3
Stanford	2

== NCAA Tournament records ==
There are three NCAA tournament records that were set in the 1982 NCAA tournament that have not yet been broken.

- Service aces, match (individual record) - Beverly Robinson, Tennessee - 11 vs. Northwestern
- Services aces, match (team record) - Tennessee, 20 (vs. Northwestern)
- Solo blocks, tournament (individual record) - Deitre Collins, Hawaiʻi - 15 (1 vs. San Jose State, 6 vs. Cal Poly, 2 vs. Stanford, 6 vs. Southern California).

== See also ==
- 1982 NCAA Division II women's volleyball tournament
- 1982 NCAA Division III women's volleyball tournament
- 1982 NAIA women's volleyball tournament
