= Hawaii–Hilo Vulcans women's volleyball =

Hawaii–Hilo Vulcans
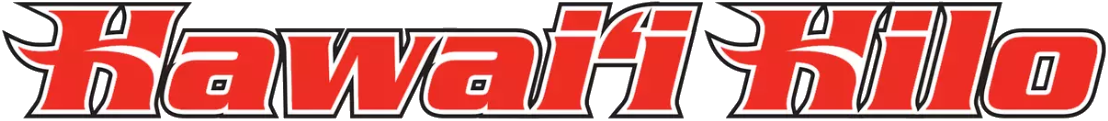
- University: University of Hawaiʻi at Hilo
- Head coach: Reed Sunahara (1st season)
- Conference: PacWest
- Location: Hilo, Hawaiʻi
- Home arena: UHH Gymnasium (capacity: 3,000)
- Nickname: Vulcans
- Colors: Red and black

AIAW/NCAA tournament champion
- 1979, 1981

AIAW/NCAA tournament runner-up
- 1978, 1980

AIAW/NCAA tournament semifinal
- 1978, 1979, 1980, 1981

AIAW/NCAA Regional Final
- NAIA: 1981, 1982, 1983, 1984, 1985, 1987, 1988, 1989, 1991, 1992, 1993

AIAW/NCAA tournament appearance
- 1978, 1979, 1980, 1981, 1994, 1995, 1997, 2009, 2011, 2019

Conference regular season champion
- NAIA: 1981, 1982, 1983, 1984, 1985, 1988, 1993 NCAA: 1994, 1995, 1997, 2007, 2009, R-u's 2019, 2020-21 HI Pod

The Hawaii–Hilo Vulcans women's volleyball team is the intercollegiate women's volleyball team of the University of Hawaiʻi at Hilo. One of the original "traditionals" in the world of small schools volleyball, the Vulcans started out as National Runners Up right out of the gates in 1978. The 1978 AIAW Div.II team was led by Cheryl Ching, Kawehi Ka'a'a, Vetoann Baker and Lyndell Lindsey. Coach Sharon Peterson (an inaugural 1988 NAIA Hall of Fame honoree) was in fact coach back then, but she had been preceded by Coach Mike Wilton for partial foundations in some of 1977. In June 2018, Manu-Olevao's became the able majority, two, assistants.

In the first week of December, in 1979 (Orlando, FL), UHH won Hawai'i its first ever National Championship of volleyball. Later that evening, Hawaii Rainbow Wahine volleyball would also win a national title for large national colleges (at Central Standard Time). All-American Cheryl Ching would go on to win the Honda-Broderick Cup in 1980, moreover, the first in the 50th State to do so. The program as a matter of circumstance would go from AIAW Division II to NAIA powers in 1981. Hilo is still the only multi-Champion, multi-Divisional program to win simultaneous collegiate championships in a single year (1981).

Throughout Coach Peterson's tenure, the Vuls as a sampling of series records would go: 2–0 against the Washington Huskies, 3–1 against the BYU Cougars, 2–2 with Minnesota, 0–1 against the Stanford Cardinal and, further, were solidly able to compete with a 1978, #4 ranked Pepperdine Waves WVB team touring the Hawaiian Islands.

== History ==
From 1981 to 1984, UH Hilo was the first USA college team to win four consecutive national titles, regardless of divisional league.

In 1988 the program's zenith topped out with a dominant NAIA National Championship season. Hawai'i small schools' glory was epitomized with a starting six, of seven, being awarded All-American certificates. Florence Alo (MVP / 2x 1st Team AA (1987–88)), Jessica Strickland (1st Team), Debra Namohala (2nd Team (1987 AA)), Edna Togiai (1st Team), Hae Ja Kim (2nd Team) and Sheila Scott (1st Team) who would, the latter, complete this list.

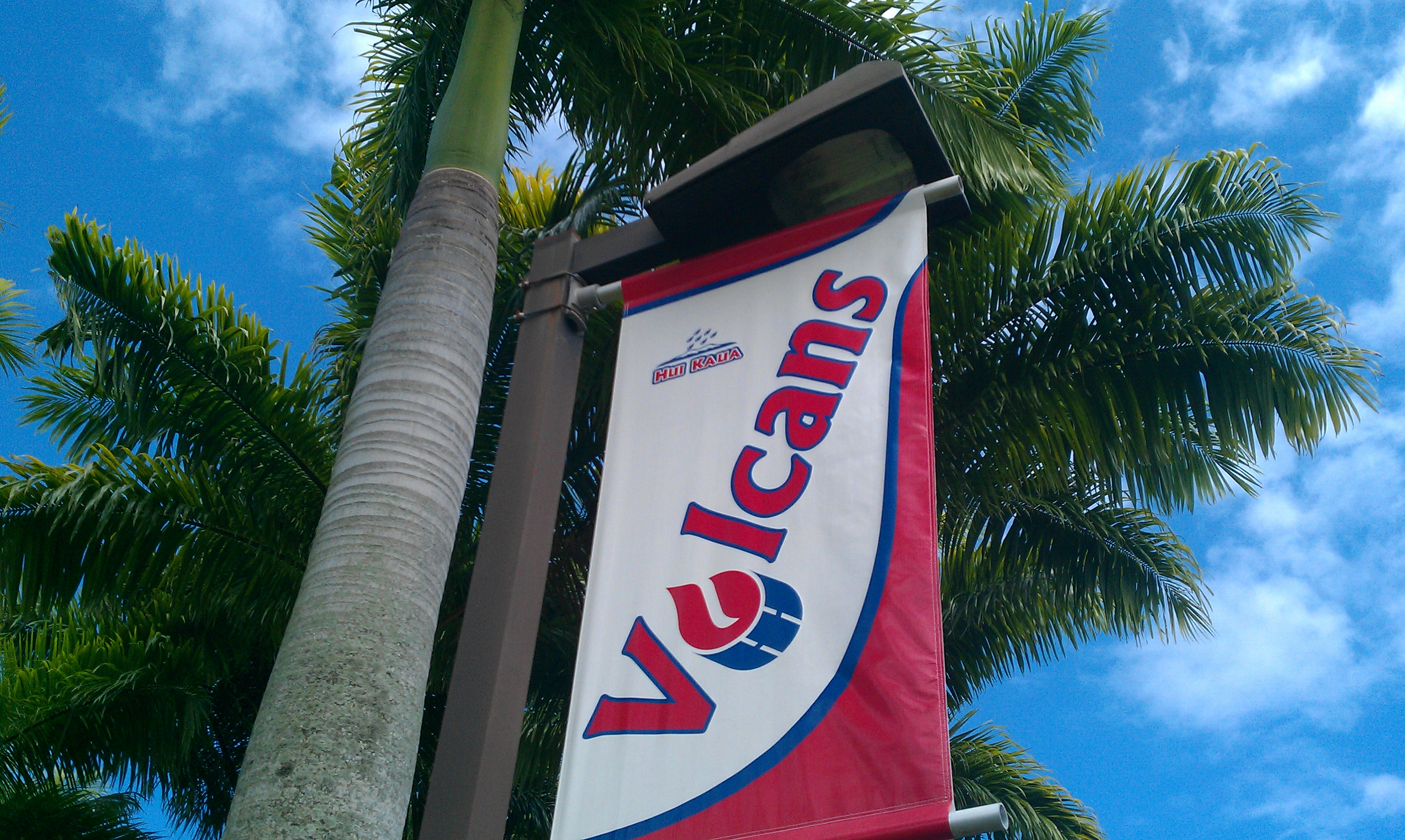
Hui Kaua~ "Contend" (Present Progressive Tense)

In 1993, runners-up University of Hawaiʻi at Hilo would lose its final match of the NAIA in the National Championship game. In 1994, University of Hawaiʻi at Hilo would once again return to the NCAA Division II league.

From 2007–present, one Hillary Hurley recorded: PacWest/AVCA Pacific Region '07 F.O.Y.; 2010 PacWest P.O.Y., as well as being a 1st Team all-PWC selection. She'd continued on professionally into the Puerto Rican League as an initial athlete, into the European continent (in 2013); she'd landed at Club NUC of Switzerland. Currently she's in Expressway Corporation (South Korea).

UHH moreover, post 2010-Ramsey's graduation, circumstantially of the Pacific Northwest, they'd also field participation in the Sound Premier PVL Team (of the AVCA).

They went a winning 15–7 in the 2011–12 school's calendar year; a, one, Marley Strand-Nicolaisen (2017 assistant), the Ka'u High School junior, recruited from Naalehu, HI also. The mid-2010s attempts to build momentum with new coaching staff.

== Short-list of All Americans ==
Edie Manzano: Ended her collegiate career in 1982 as the league's MVP (having started in 1978). Was the 1983 small-schools, and UHH's second, nominee for the Honda-Broderick Cup.
Alofa Tagataese (1980–1983): Three-time First Team all-American (1981–Div.II; 1982–83–NAIA). Could hit a .861 clip-percentage (19 of 22 attempts). 1994 inductee into the UHH Vulcans' Hall of Fame. Assistant coach in 2006.
Nalani Spencer-Viveiros: 5x National Champion (from Kalani). Three-time 1st Team All-American (NAIA-83/84, USAV-Berkeley Nationals).
Cora Caparida-Schnackenberg: c/o 1986–87, when she became a SR 1st Team All-American. Purposed for The Friendly Isle of Moloka'i as a politician, it is her original home. The Schnackenberg's roots, in Santa Barbara, CA, are with STIHL Tools-agricultural & gardening power equipment.
Laurie Kemp (Jan. 1960 – May 2017): Two-time All American (1991 HM & NAIA Academic's, 1992 First Team). Hawaiian professional on Beach Circuit. Vulcans H o F, 2003. Forever Barefoot in Kailua (Oahu) and Lahaina (Maui).
Rosa Torres: Peru national team member, 1994 Pac West Conference co-POY, starting setter on Hawai'i Waves professional WVB team (late 1990s).
Tanya Fuamatu (1992–1995): 1993 NAIA P.O.Y., 1995 AVCA Div.II 1st Team All-American, 2001 Athletics H o F inductee, AVP Professional (2001–07)
Charlene Kahuanui-Christenson: Three-time National Champion; being incorporated at middle blocker, she'd earned 1st Team all-American honors. She is the mother of Olympic medalist, and near top of the world's best (at 2018), Micah Christenson.
Bria Beale (HM all-American): Four time 1st team PacWest Conf., 2× D2CCAA West Regional selection, 2021 NCAA Woman of the Year—semifinalist.

== Head coaching ==
- 1978–2002: Sharon Peterson (511 W's – 251 L's)
- 2003–2005: Julie Morgan
- 2006: All-Am. Carla Carpenter-Kabalis, See too: Kahala & Ku'ulei (Interim)
- 2007–10: Bruce Atkinson (Responsible for two AVCA Division II HM All-Americans from Brazil (C/O 2008–09))
- 2010–2016: Tino Reyes
- 2017–2018: Gene Krieger
- 2019–2024: Chris Leonard
