= NCAA Division II women's volleyball tournament =

Annual tournament in the United States

- Association: NCAA
- Sport: College indoor volleyball
- Founded: 1981; 45 years ago
- Division: Division II
- Country: United States; Canada
- Most recent champion: MSU Denver (1st)
- Most titles: Concordia Saint Paul (9)
- Website: NCAA.com

The NCAA Division II women's volleyball tournament is the annual tournament hosted by the National Collegiate Athletic Association to determine the national champions women's collegiate volleyball among its Division II members in the United States and Canada. It has been held annually since 1981, typically played in December after the fall regular season (the Division II men's tournament, conversely, is held in the spring).

The most successful program has been Concordia Saint Paul, who have won nine titles.

The most recent champions are MSU Denver, who won their first national title in 2025.

== History ==
From 1970 through 1980, before the NCAA governed women's collegiate athletics, the Association for Intercollegiate Athletics for Women alone conducted the women's collegiate volleyball championships.

Volleyball was one of twelve women's sports added to the NCAA championship program for the 1981-82 school year, as the NCAA engaged in battle with the AIAW for sole governance of women's collegiate sports. The AIAW continued to conduct its established championship program in the same twelve (and other) sports; however, after a year of dual women's championships, the NCAA conquered the AIAW and usurped its authority and membership.

There is also an NCAA Men's National Collegiate Volleyball Championship for men's volleyball teams in Division I and Division II seeing as there are far fewer men's programs than women's.

== Champions ==
- Note: See Association for Intercollegiate Athletics for Women Champions for the Division II volleyball champions from 1975 to 1981. NOTE: In 1981 there were both NCAA and AIAW champions.

NCAA Division II Volleyball Championship
Year	Site (Host Team)	Championship			Third Place Final / Semifinalists		
Year	Site (Host Team)	Champion	Games	Runner-up	Third-place	Games	Fourth-place
1981; Details	Riverside, CA (UC Riverside)	Sacramento State	3–0	Lewis	Cal State Northridge	3–0	Florida Southern
1982; Details	Northridge, CA (Cal State Northridge)	UC Riverside	3–0	Cal State Northridge	Portland State	3–0	Sacramento State
1983; Details	Lakeland, FL (Florida Southern)	Cal State Northridge	3–2	Portland State	Air Force	3–0	Nebraska–Omaha
1984; Details	Portland, OR (Portland State)	Portland State	3–0	Cal State Northridge	Sacramento State	3–0	Sam Houston State
1985; Details	Portland, OR (Portland State)	Portland State (2)	3–1	Cal State Northridge	Nebraska–Omaha	3–2	Sam Houston State
1986; Details	Riverside, CA (UC Riverside)	UC Riverside (2)	3–0	Cal State Northridge	Nebraska–Omaha	3–0	North Dakota State
1987; Details	Northridge, CA (Cal State Northridge)	Cal State Northridge (2)	3–2	Central Missouri State	Nebraska–Omaha	3–2	Ferris State
1988; Details	Fargo, ND (North Dakota State)	Portland State (3)	3–0	Cal State Northridge	North Dakota State	3–2	Regis
1989; Details	Bakersfield, CA (Cal State Bakersfield)	Cal State Bakersfield	3–0	Sacramento State	North Dakota State	3–1	Florida Southern
1990; Details	Bakersfield, CA (Cal State Bakersfield)	West Texas State	3–0	North Dakota State	Cal State Bakersfield	3–2	Portland State
1991; Details	Canyon, TX (West Texas State)	West Texas State (2)	3–0	Portland State	North Dakota State	3–0	Florida Southern
1992; Details	Portland, OR (Portland State)	Portland State (4)	3–2	Northern Michigan	West Texas State	3–0	Cal State Los Angeles
1993; Details	Marquette, MI (Northern Michigan)	Northern Michigan	3–1	Cal State Bakersfield	Portland State	3–2	Northern Colorado
1994; Details	Bakersfield, CA (Cal State Bakersfield)	Northern Michigan (2)	3–1	Cal State Bakersfield	Northern Colorado	3–0	Central Missouri State
1995; Details	Miami Shores, FL (Barry)	Barry	3–1	Northern Michigan	Cal State Bakersfield	3–2	Central Missouri State
1996; Details	Warrensburg, MO (Central Missouri State)	Nebraska–Omaha	3–2	Tampa	Northern Michigan	3–0	Central Missouri State
1997; Details	Bakersfield, CA (Cal State Bakersfield)	West Texas A&M (3)	3–2	Barry	Cal State Bakersfield	3–0	Northern Michigan
1998; Details	Kissimmee, FL	Hawaii Pacific	3–1	North Dakota State	Regis and Tampa		
1999; Details	Battle Creek, MI	BYU–Hawaii	3–0	Tampa	Northern Kentucky and West Texas A&M		
2000; Details	Sioux Falls, SD (Augustana–SD)	Hawaii Pacific (2)	3–0	Augustana (SD)	California (PA) and North Alabama		
2001; Details	Allendale, MI (Grand Valley State)	Barry (2)	3–0	South Dakota State	UC San Diego and Grand Valley State		
2002; Details	Canyon, TX (West Texas A&M)	BYU Hawaii	3–0	Truman State	Grand Valley State and Tampa		
2003; Details	San Bernardino, CA (Cal State San Bernardino)	North Alabama	3–1	Concordia St. Paul	Cal State San Bernardino and Grand Valley State		
2004; Details	Miami Shores, FL (Barry)	Barry (3)	3–1	Truman	Minnesota–Duluth and Nebraska–Kearney		
2005; Details	Kearney, NE (Nebraska–Kearney)	Grand Valley State	3–1	Nebraska–Kearney	Cal State Los Angeles and Tampa		
2006; Details	Pensacola, FL (West Florida)	Tampa	3–1	North Alabama	Minnesota–Duluth and West Texas A&M		
2007; Details	Topeka, KS (Washburn)	Concordia St. Paul	3–1	Western Washington	Washburn and West Texas A&M		
2008; Details	St. Paul, MN (Concordia St. Paul)	Concordia St. Paul (2)	3–2	Cal State San Bernardino	Grand Valley State and Truman		
2009; Details	St. Paul, MN (Concordia St. Paul)	Concordia St. Paul (3)	3–0	West Texas A&M	Cal State San Bernardino and Flagler		
2010; Details	Louisville, KY	Concordia St. Paul (4)	3–1	Tampa	Central Missouri and Dowling		
2011; Details	San Bernardino, CA (Cal State San Bernardino)	Concordia St. Paul (5)	3–0	Cal State San Bernardino	Hillsdale and Tampa		
2012; Details	Pensacola, FL (West Florida)	Concordia St. Paul (6)	3–2	Tampa	BYU–Hawaii and Indianapolis		
2013; Details	Cedar Rapids, IA (Upper Iowa University)	Concordia St. Paul (7)	3–0	BYU–Hawaii	West Texas A&M and Wheeling Jesuit		
2014; Details	Louisville, KY (Bellarmine)	Tampa (2)	3–0	Southwest Minnesota State	Arkansas–Fort Smith and Grand Valley State		
2015; Details	Tampa, FL (Tampa)	Wheeling Jesuit	3–0	Palm Beach Atlantic	Wayne State (NE) and Western Washington		
2016; Details	Sioux Falls, SD (Northern Sun)	Concordia St. Paul (8)	3–0	Alaska–Anchorage	Palm Beach Atlantic and Lewis		
2017; Details	Pensacola, FL (West Florida)	Concordia St. Paul (9)	3–0	Florida Southern	Gannon and Rockhurst		
2018; Details	Pittsburgh, PA (Clarion)	Tampa (3)	3–2	Western Washington	Lewis and Washburn		
2019; Details	Denver, CO (Metro State Univ of Denver)	Cal State San Bernardino (1)	3–1	Nebraska–Kearney	Regis (CO) and Rockhurst		
2020	~~Sioux Falls, SD~~; ~~(Sanford Pentagon)~~	Cancelled due to COVID-19 pandemic					
2021; Details	Tampa, FL (Tampa Spartans)	Tampa (4)	3–0	Washburn	Gannon and Western Washington		
2022; Details	Seattle, WA (Seattle Pacific)	West Texas A&M (4)	3-1	Concordia St. Paul	Cal State Los Angeles and UMSL		
2023; Details	Moon Township, PA (Clarion)	Cal State Los Angeles	3–1	West Texas A&M	UMSL and Tampa		
2024; Details	Sioux Falls, SD (Northern Sun)	Lynn	3–2	San Francisco State	Angelo State and Bentley		
2025; Details	Sioux Falls, SD (Northern Sun)	MSU Denver	3–1	Concordia St. Paul	Point Loma and Tampa		
2026	Kansas City, MO (MIAA)						
2027	Tampa, FL (Tampa)						

=== Records ===
- Most championships: Concordia St. Paul (9)
- Undefeated Seasons: Hawaii Pacific (2000), Concordia St. Paul (2009), Cal State San Bernardino (2019)

=== Location of Champions ===
Schools with national championships
— 9 championships, – 4 championships, – 3 championships, – 2 championships, – 1 championship

=== Current Division II ===
Team	Titles	Years
Concordia St. Paul	9	2007, 2008, 2009, 2010, 2011, 2012, 2013, 2016, 2017
Tampa	4	2006, 2014, 2018, 2021
West Texas A&M	4	1990, 1991, 1997, 2022
Barry	3	1995, 2001, 2004
Hawaii Pacific	2	1998, 2000
Northern Michigan	2	1993, 1994
MSU Denver	1	2025
Lynn	1	2024
Cal State Los Angeles	1	2023
Cal State San Bernardino	1	2019
Wheeling	1	2015
Grand Valley State	1	2005

=== Former Division II ===
School	Titles	Years
Portland State	4	1984, 1985, 1988, 1992
BYU Hawaii	2	1999, 2002
Cal State Northridge	2	1983, 1987
UC Riverside	2	1982, 1986
North Alabama	1	2003
Omaha	1	1996
Cal State Bakersfield	1	1989
Sacramento State	1	1981

== See also ==
- NCAA Women's Volleyball Championships (Division I, Division III)
- AIAW Intercollegiate Women's Volleyball Champions
- NCAA Men's Volleyball Championships (Divisions I and II, Division III)
- NAIA Volleyball Championship
- AVCA
