= North Dakota State Bison women's volleyball =

Women's volleyball team of North Dakota State University

- University: North Dakota State University
- Head coach: Jennifer Lopez (8th season)
- Conference: Summit League
- Location: Fargo, North Dakota, US
- Home arena: Benson Bunker Fieldhouse (capacity: 1,206)
- Nickname: Bison

AIAW/NCAA tournament runner-up
- 1990, 1998

AIAW/NCAA tournament semifinal
- 1975, 1981, 1986, 1990, 1998

AIAW/NCAA Regional Final
- 1988, 1989, 1990, 1991, 1992, 1998, 1999

AIAW/NCAA tournament appearance
- 1973, 1974, 1975, 1976, 1977, 1978, 1979, 1980, 1981, 1982, 1983, 1984, 1986, 1987, 1988, 1989, 1990, 1991, 1992, 1993, 1995, 1996, 1997, 1998, 1999, 2000, 2001, 2002, 2003, 2008, 2010, 2011

Conference tournament champion
- 1973, 1974, 1975, 1981, 1982, 1988, 1989, 1990, 1991, 1992, 2008, 2010, 2011

The North Dakota State Bison volleyball team is the NCAA Division I women's volleyball team at North Dakota State University located in Fargo, North Dakota. The program began its first season in 1965 under head coach Collette Folstad. The current Bison head coach is Jennifer Lopez in her 8th season. Lopez took over after former coach Kari Thompson resigned after the 2016 season.

== History ==
The Bison made the AIAW tournament every time from 1970 to 1981, except for two seasons in 1972 and 1980. Then in Division II, NDSU played in a regional every year from 1982 to 2003, except for 1985 and 1994. While in Division II, the Bison finished in the Elite Eight five times, the Final Four three times, and a national runner-up twice.
Since North Dakota State entered Division I in 2008, the Bison have made the NCAA tournament three times. The team also made the NIVC tournament in 2022 after falling short in the semifinal round of the Summit League tournament.

The Bison have been a part of multiple conferences. While in the AIAW, NDSU played in the Minn-Kota Conference from 1970-78. It was a conference mainly centered around AIAW programs in Minnesota and both North and South Dakota. Then in 1979, the team joined the North Central Conference and followed along as the league moved up to Division II starting in the 1982 season. The Bison would remain there until the end of the 2003 season when NDSU's athletic programs moved up to Division I. While moving up, NDSU was an independent. Starting in the 2007 season, the Bison played in the Summit League and have remained there ever since.

== Season-by-season history ==
Season	Coach	Record		Conf. Tournament	Postseason
Season	Coach	Overall	Conference (Conf. Standing)	Conf. Tournament	Postseason
1965	Collette Folstad	0–1	–	–	
1966	Collette Folstad	0–3	–	–	
1967	Collette Folstad	5–5	–	–	
1968	Judy Ray	2–6	–	–	
1969	Judy Ray	3–5	–	–	
1970	Judy Ray	12–2	–	–	AIAW Regionals
1971	Judy Ray	10–5	–	–	AIAW Regionals
1972	Sharon Anderson	10–7	–	2nd	
1973	Judy Ray	9–11	3–4 (5th)	1st	AIAW Regionals
1974	Judy Ray	15–7	6–1 (T-1st)	–	AIAW Regionals
1975	Judy Ray	25–10	6–1 (2nd)	1st	AIAW Nationals
1976	Judy Ray	23–18	4–3 (3rd)	4th	AIAW Regionals
1977	Donnie Lauf	15–21	5–2 (3rd)	5th	AIAW Regionals
1978	Donna Palivec	24–19	5–2 (2nd)	3rd	AIAW Regionals
1979	Donna Palivec	29–21	–	4th	AIAW Regionals
1980	Donna Palivec	26–14	–	2nd	
1981	Donna Palivec	41–11	–	1st	AIAW Nationals
1982	Donna Palivec	43–10	–	1st	NCAA Regional
1983	Donna Palivec	43–20	–	2nd	NCAA Regional
1984	Donna Palivec	55–13	–	2nd	NCAA Regional
1985	Donna Palivec	20–16	5–2 (3rd)	2nd	
1986	Donna Palivec	43–13	6–1 (2nd)	2nd	Final Four
1987	Cathy Olson	44–8	6–1 (2nd)	2nd	NCAA Regional
1988	Cathy Olson	43–3	7–0 (1st)	1st	NCAA Final Four
1989	Jolyn Koppinger	30–6	8–1 (1st)	1st	NCAA Final Four
1990	Jolyn Koppinger	33–6	9–0 (1st)	1st	NCAA Runner-up
1991	Jolyn Koppinger	35–5	9–0 (1st)	1st	NCAA Final Four
1992	Jolyn Montgomery	35–5	8–1 (1st)	1st	NCAA Elite Eight
1993	Carolyn Eide	19–10	8–1 (1st)	–	NCAA Regional
1994	Carolyn Eide	20–11	12–6 (3rd)		
1995	Zaundra Bina	25–9	13–5 (3rd)		NCAA Regional
1996	Zaundra Bina	28–6	15–3 (3rd)		NCAA Regional
1997	Zaundra Bina	27–7	14–4 (3rd)		NCAA Regional
1998	Zaundra Bina	33–4	16–2 (1st)		NCAA Runner-up
1999	Zaundra Bina	29–4	16–2 (1st)		NCAA Elite Eight
2000	Zaundra Bina	21–13	11–7 (5th)		NCAA Regional
2001	Zaundra Bina	30–4	17–1 (1st)		NCAA Regional
2002	Zaundra Bina	21–12	8–8 (T-4th)		NCAA Regional
2003	Zaundra Bina	25–9	11–3 (T-1st)		NCAA Regional
2004	Zaundra Bina	13–20	Division I Independent		Ineligible due to transition to Division I
2005	Zaundra Bina	5–31	Division I Independent		Ineligible due to transition to Division I
2006	Erich Hinterstocker	17–13	Division I Independent		Ineligible due to transition to Division I
2007	Erich Hinterstocker	20–8	12–4 (T-2nd)	Semifinal	
2008	Erich Hinterstocker	24–4	16–0 (1st)	Champions	NCAA First Round
2009	Erich Hinterstocker	23–4	18–0 (1st)	Runner-up	
2010	Erich Hinterstocker; Kari Thompson	11–9; 9–2	8–3; 6–1 (T-1st)	Champions	NCAA First Round
2011	Kari Thompson	26–9	16–2 (1st)	Champions	NCAA First Round
2012	Kari Thompson	13–18	8–8 (6th)	–	
2013	Kari Thompson	6–22	6–8 (7th)	–	
2014	Kari Thompson	15–17	8–8 (5th)	Semifinal	
2015	Kari Thompson	19–12	10–6 (4th)	–	
2016	Kari Thompson	14–18	11–5 (3rd)	Semifinal	
2017	Jennifer Lopez	19–9	9–5 (4th)	Semifinal	
2018	Jennifer Lopez	9–20	6–10 (6th)	Semifinal	
2019	Jennifer Lopez	13–16	8–8 (5th)	Quarterfinal	
2020^	Jennifer Lopez	10–8	8–8 (5th)	–	
2021	Jennifer Lopez	12–18	6–12 (7th)	–	
2022	Jennifer Lopez	21–12	13–5 (3rd)	Semifinal	NIVC First Round
2023	Jennifer Lopez	18–11	9–7 (5th)	Semifinal	
2024	Jennifer Lopez	12–14	8–8 (4th)	Quarterfinal	
2025	Jennifer Lopez	17–11	10–6 (4th)	Semifinal	
2026	Jennifer Lopez	15–9	7–7 (T-4th)		

^ - Played in Spring 2021

== AIAW/NCAA/NIVC Tournament History ==
=== NCAA Division I Tournament History ===
The Bison have appeared in three NCAA Division I tournaments. Their combined record is 0–3.

Year	Seed	Round	Opponent	Result
2008		First round	#6 Minnesota	L 0–3
2010		First round	#10 Minnesota	L 0–3
2011		First round	#13 Minnesota	L 0–3

=== National Invitational Volleyball Championship History ===
The Bison have appeared in 1 NIVC tournament. Their combined record is 0–1.

Year	Round	Opponent	Result
2022	First round	Davidson	L 1-3

=== NCAA Division II Tournament History ===
The Bison have appeared in 20 NCAA Division II tournaments. Their combined record was 28–22.

Year	Round	Opponent	Result
1982	Regional	Edinboro	W 3–2
1982	Regional	Cal State Northridge	L 0–3
1983	Regional	Portland State	W 3–0
1983	Regional	Sacramento State	L 1–3
1984	Regional	Omaha	W 3–0
1984	Regional	Cal State Northridge	L 1–3
1986	Regional	Portland State	W 3–0
1986	Regional	Sacramento State	W 3–2
1986	Final Four	UC Riverside	L 0–3
1986	Final Four	Omaha	L 0–3
1987	Regional	Purdue Fort Wayne	W 3–2
1987	Regional	Ferris State	L 2–3
1988	Regional	St. Cloud State	W 3–1
1988	Elite Eight	Tampa	W 3–2
1988	Elite Eight	Cal State Northridge	L 1–3
1988	Elite Eight	Regis	W 3–2
1989	Regional	Omaha	W 3–0
1989	Regional	Central Missouri State	W 3–0
1989	Elite Eight	UC Riverside	W 3–2
1989	Elite Eight	Sacramento State	L 1–3
1989	Elite Eight	Florida Southern	W 3–1
1990	Regional	Minnesota State Mankato	W 3–1
1990	Final Four	Sacramento State	W 3–1
1990	Final Four	Cal State Bakersfield	W 3–1
1990	Final Four	West Texas State	L 0–3
1991	Regional	Minnesota-Duluth	W 3–1
1991	Elite Eight	Cal State Bakersfield	W 3–1
1991	Elite Eight	Portland State	L 1–3
1991	Elite Eight	Florida Southern	W 3–0
1992	Regional	Augustana (SD)	W 3–0
1992	Elite Eight	Cal State LA	L 0–3
1993	Regional	Omaha	L 0–3
1995	Regional	Northern Colorado	L 1–3
1996	Regional	Augustana (SD)	W 3–2
1996	Regional	Omaha	L 1–3
1997	Regional	Omaha	L 1–3
1998	Regional	Minnesota-Duluth	W 3–0
1998	Regional	Augustana (SD)	W 3–0
1998	Elite Eight	Edinboro	W 3–0
1998	Elite Eight	Regis	W 3–2
1998	Elite Eight	Hawaii Pacific	L 1–3
1999	Regional	Augustana (SD)	W 3–2
1999	Regional	Northern Colorado	W 3–2
1999	Elite Eight	BYU-Hawaii	L 0–3
2000	Regional	Northern Colorado	L 1–3
2001	Regional	Northern Colorado	W 3–0
2001	Regional	South Dakota State	L 2–3
2002	Regional	Minnesota State Mankato	L 0–3
2003	Regional	North Dakota	W 3–0
2003	Regional	Concordia-St. Paul	L 2–3
