= Daniel K. Inouye College of Pharmacy =

Pharmacy school in Hawaii, United States

The Daniel K. Inouye College of Pharmacy
- Other name: DKICP
- Motto: Ho'omalu Ola (Hawaiian)
- Motto in English: Guardians of Health
- Type: Public
- Established: 2007
- Affiliations: University of Hawaii at Hilo
- Dean: Miriam A. Mobley Smith (interim)
- Location: Hilo, Hawaii, U.S.
- Colors: Crimson & black
- Website: pharmacy.uhh.hawaii.edu
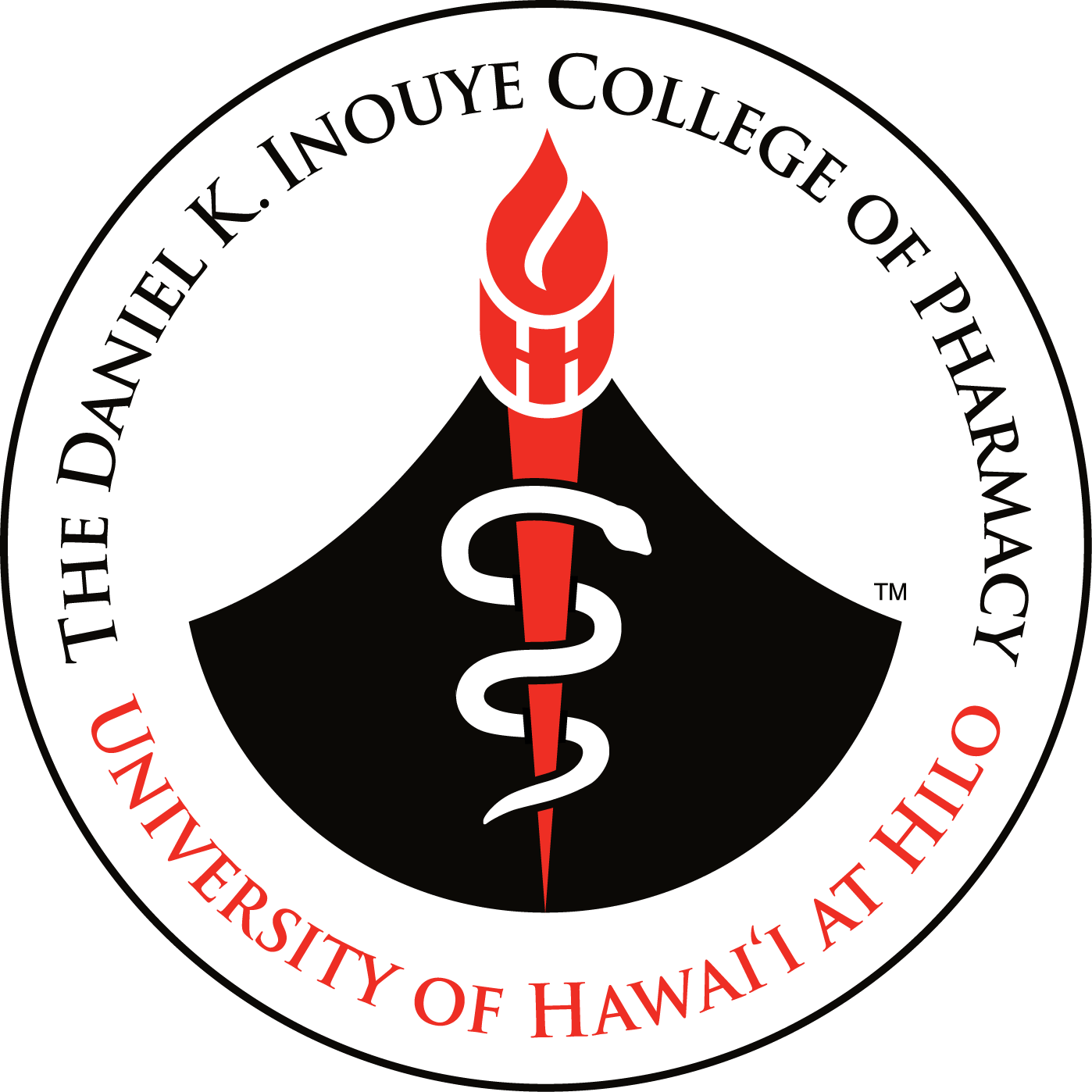

The Daniel K. Inouye College of Pharmacy is one of six colleges within the public University of Hawaiʻi at Hilo (UH Hilo). The school awards a four-year Doctor of Pharmacy degree (Pharm.D.) and is by the Accreditation Council for Pharmacy Education.

The College of Pharmacy was founded in 2007 and graduated its inaugural class in 2011. It is the only pharmacy school in the state of Hawaiʻi.

== History ==
=== Daniel K. Inouye ===
The late United States Senator Daniel K. Inouye, after whom the school is named, broached the idea of establishing a school of pharmacy in Hawai'i in 1998. Before that, he had supported rural America, sponsoring bills providing better education and healthcare in under-served areas.

The senator secured funding for the school in 2001, and by the end of 2004, the state legislature allotted approximately $20 million for the development of the college of pharmacy. Later that year, the legislature approved a search for a dean. In 2011 Senator Inouye introduced the Pharmacist Student Loan Repayment Eligibility Act of 2011, which helped student pharmacists afford their educations.

=== Accreditation ===
The ACPE granted the college accreditation in 2011.

=== Emblem ===
The school's emblem is a torch entwined by a snake superimposed on the outline of the volcano Kilauea. The torch symbolizes enlightenment. The serpent, seen on the Rod of Asclepius or Bowl of Hygeia, is the symbol of medicine or pharmacy, respectively. The volcano pays homage to the college's home and emphasizes its unique environment in which to learn and practice pharmacy.

== Campus ==
The campus consists of four main buildings located adjacent to the main UH Hilo campus. Across the intersection is the ʻImiloa Astronomy Center. One building houses laboratories for research projects by the faculty and students. The main lecture halls consist of two large rooms accommodating roughly 90 students. The campus also has a mock pharmacy, where students may practice counseling or participate in practical exams.

The DKICP also has laboratory operations at the Panaʻewa Rainforest Zoo & Gardens, located roughly fifteen minutes south of Hilo, and faculty offices at the Hilo Medical Center. The Hawaiʻi Island Family Health Center is a partner with the campus and clinical pharmacy professors work on site.

In 2010, Governor Linda Lingle approved funding requests and the schematics for a permanent campus were introduced in 2011. As of 2018, the building remains under construction.

== Academics ==
=== Pharm.D. ===
The DKICP offers the Doctor of Pharmacy degree to students who complete the four-year program which consists of six semesters plus a fourth year dedicated to rotations. The first year of the program is primarily an introduction to important pharmacy topics, such as "Self-Care" and "Biostatistics". The second and third years cover "integrated therapeutics," which encompasses pathophysiology, pharmacology of treatments, medicinal chemistry, and therapeutics. Other core classes are: "Communications for Pharmacists", "Healthcare Systems" and "Complementary Medicine". There are also electives, such as "veterinary medicine", and a full semester course that focuses on antibiotics.

During these first three years of schooling, introductory experiential courses are embedded throughout the semester and also during a rotational block in the summer each year. This allows students to gradually merge textbook learning and hands-on experience. The fourth and final year is dedicated to advanced experiential courses, which are divided into six-week blocks with four required core rotations and several elective rotations.

=== BAPS Program ===
The Bachelor of Arts in Pharmacy Studies (BAPS) is an option for students who are accepted to the school without completing the undergraduate degree.

=== Ph.D. Program ===
The Ph.D. in Pharmaceutical Sciences is focused on "natural products discovery and development". This program takes full advantage of the fact that the DKICP is located on an island with a unique diverse flora.

=== Pre-Pharmacy Program ===
This is a preparatory program that guides undergraduate students toward becoming competitive candidates for any Doctor of Pharmacy program. The curriculum for the Pre-Pharmacy Program is about two to three years long and does not guarantee acceptance into DKICP.

=== M.S. Clinical Psychopharmacology ===
The Master of Science in Clinical Psychopharmacology (MSCP) degree is a two-year program involving both didactic and experiential courses. The program requires a doctoral degree in clinical psychology with an active license.

== Reputation & Community Involvement ==
- Every year, students of the DKICP host a health fair for the community, providing free screening, educational booths on diseases and medications, counseling, vaccinations and other services.
- The American Journal of Pharmaceutical Education published a review of available literature regarding rural health pharmacy education throughout the United States. In this review, it underlined the DKICP's ongoing efforts in improving "health care not only to rural areas but to all areas of the state".
- With the opening of the DKICP, pharmacy residency programs in Hawai'i have doubled to twelve total resident positions throughout the state.
- A study was conducted to gauge the positive economic impact of the school on the local community which it estimated to be a $50 million stimulus. This was considered an underestimate upon further review because it did not take into account extramural funding, such as awards and grants earned by the DKICP, which "has exceeded $40 million".
- Between 2011 and 2012, the Narcotics Enforcement Division, which handles Hawaii's Uniform Controlled Substance Act, and the DKICP partnered and collected more than 3.5 metric tons of unused or unwanted medications that needed to be disposed of safely. These medications would have otherwise been disposed of down toilets, drains and dumps.
