= University of Hawaiʻi at West Oʻahu =

Public university in Kapolei, Hawaii

University of Hawaiʻi–West Oʻahu
- Other name: UH West Oʻahu
- Former name: West Oʻahu College (1976–1989)
- Type: Public college
- Established: 1976; 50 years ago
- Parent institution: University of Hawaiʻi
- Accreditation: WSCUC
- Endowment: $491.36 million (2023) (system-wide)
- Chancellor: Carlos G. Peñaloza (Interim Chancellor)
- President: Wendy Hensel
- Total staff: 259
- Students: 2,897 (Fall 2025)
- Location: Kapolei, Hawaii, United States; 21.356°N 158.056°W
- Campus: Suburban
- Campus News: Ka Puna o Kaloi
- Colors: UH West O'ahu Red; Black
- Mascot: Pueo
- Website: westoahu.hawaii.edu

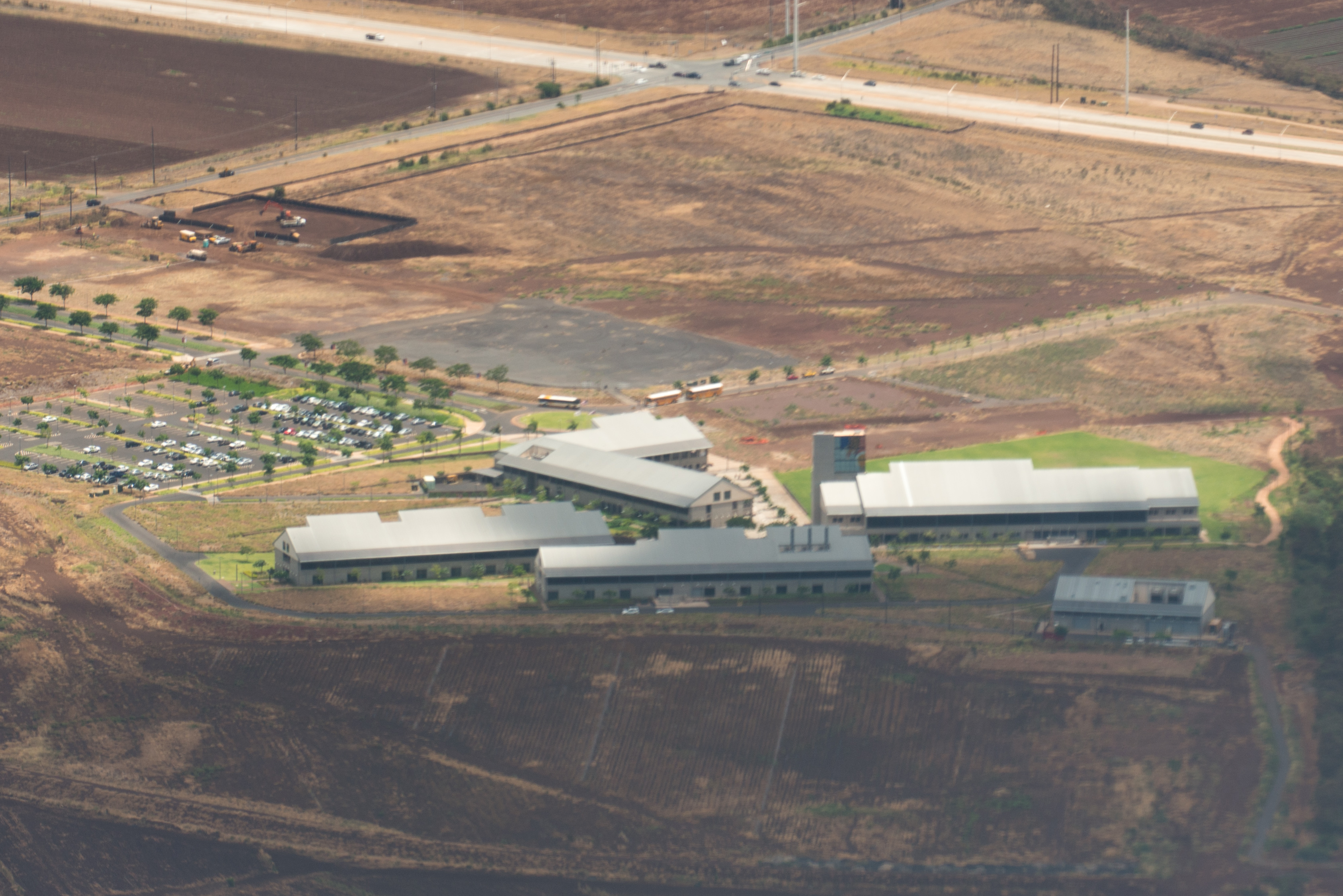
Aerial view of the East Kapolei campus in 2013

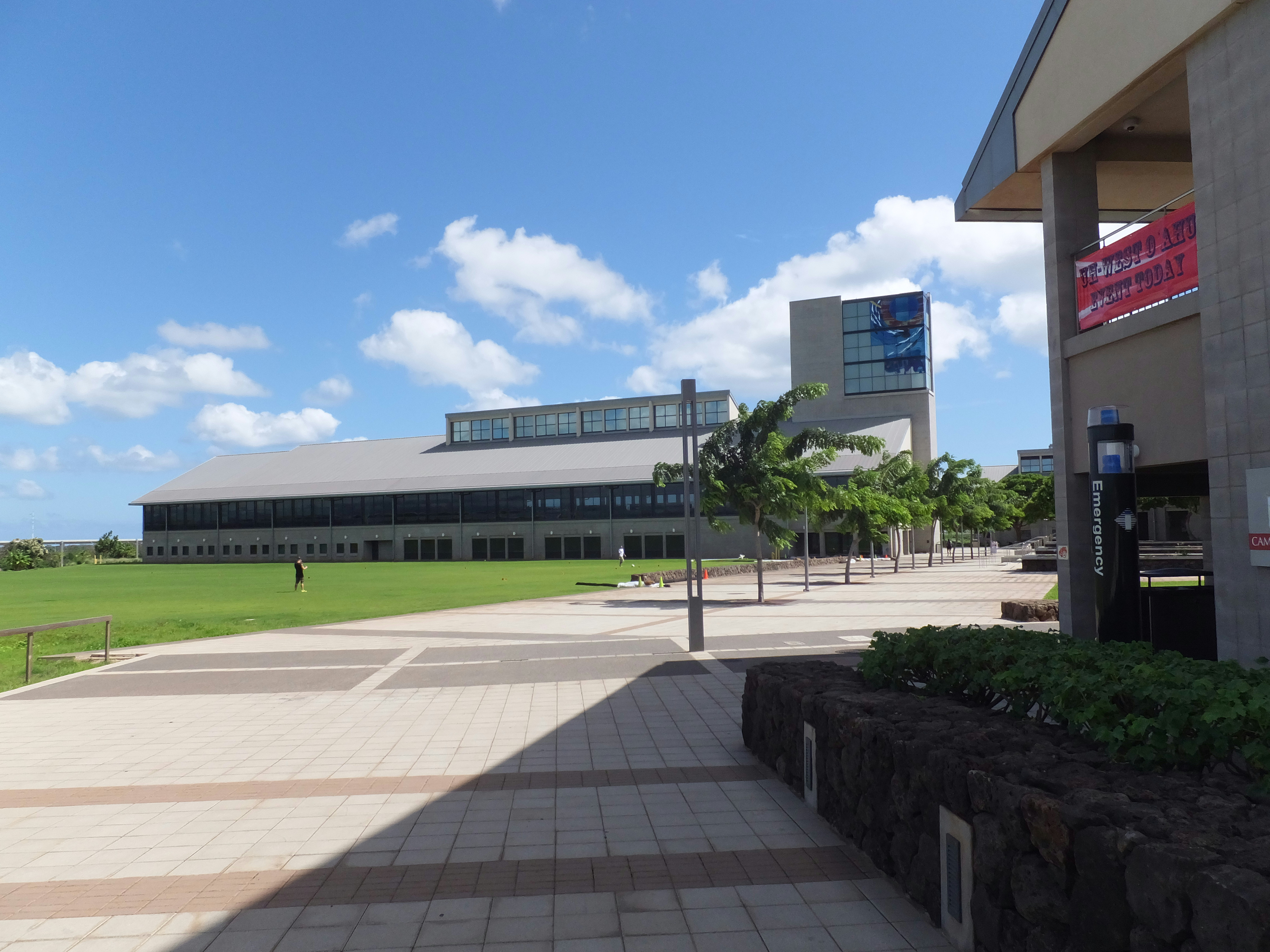
Campus in 2015

The University of Hawaiʻi–West Oʻahu (UHWO; also known as University of Hawaiʻi at West Oʻahu) is a public college in Kapolei, Hawaii, United States. It is part of the University of Hawaiʻi system. It offers baccalaureate degrees in liberal arts and professional studies. UHWO opened in January 1976. In 1981 it was accredited by the WASC Senior College and University Commission or its predecessor. In 2007, the school added first- and second-year subjects, becoming a four-year college.

In 2019, UHWO was the fastest-growing public baccalaureate college in the US. It has one of the most diverse student populations among four-year public institutions, according to the Chronicle of Higher Education. It is the university's newest campus. It was established in part to provide access to higher education in Leeward Oʻahu. UHWO supports the study of Hawaiian language, history and culture.

The college offers only undergraduate education. It enrolled 3,182 students in fall 2018, many from Leeward Oʻahu. UHWO also reaches students around the state with its Distance Learning program. About 10 percent of UHWO's enrollment listed another island as their permanent address. As of 2017, UHWO had the highest percentage of distance and online courses and programs and the highest percentage of part-time students in University of Hawaiʻi.

== History ==
The idea for opening a second UH campus on Oʻahu formed in the mid-1960s over concern that the University of Hawaiʻi at Mānoa could not accommodate everyone.

In 1966, the University of Hawaiʻi Board of Regents approved a plan calling for the opening of such a campus. In 1970, UH executive Richard Kosaki was appointed chancellor for the proposed school known as West Oʻahu College. Kosaki proposed a new campus to serve the growing population in Leeward Oʻahu, where college attendance lagged other areas on the island.

Opponents held that another campus was not needed and would take resources from other campuses.

The college was approved by the Board of Regents as an upper division school in 1975. It opened in January 1976 enrolling 75 students at Mililani, Campbell and Pearl City high schools. It moved later that year to a Newtown Square office building in ʻAiea, offering day and evening classes. The institution gained WASC accreditation in February 1981 and moved adjacent to Leeward Community College in Pearl City. It began outreach programs in 1981 and 1983 sending faculty to Kauaʻi and Maui to teach classes on weekends.

In 1989, the school's name changed to the University of Hawaiʻi – West Oʻahu to better identify it as part of the University of Hawaiʻi System. It began planning to become a four-year institution. UHWO added lower-division curricula in 2007, and in 2012 moved to a newly built campus in Kapolei.

An Administration and Health Science building was added in 2018, and construction on a building for the Academy for Creative Media began in January 2019.

== Academics ==
UHWO offers degree programs and concentrations that emphasize liberal arts and practical applications, including creative media, cybersecurity, facilities management, and sustainable community food systems. Students choose among eight degree offerings with more than 40 concentrations. Average class size in Fall 2018 was 20 students. UHWO also offers the following eight certificates: Applied Forensic Anthropology, Asian Studies, Disaster Preparedness & Emergency Management, Gender Studies, Health Care Administration, Music, Risk Management & Insurance, and Substance Abuse & Addictions Studies.

Undergraduate demographics as of Fall 2023
Race and ethnicity	Total
Asian	35%
Two or more races	34%
Hispanic	15%
White	8%
Native Hawaiian/Pacific Islander	4%
Black	2%
International student	1%
Economic diversity
Low-income (Note: The percentage of students who received an income-based federal Pell grant intended for low-income students.)	35%
Affluent (Note: The percentage of students who are a part of the American middle class at the bare minimum.)	65%

=== Distance learning ===
UHWO offers in-person and online classes. Twenty-nine percent of students were enrolled exclusively in distance education courses in Fall 2017; 38 percent took at least one such course.

University of Hawaiʻi System Community College students on Neighbor Islands can pursue online four-year degrees and certificates at University of Hawaiʻi – West Oʻahu. Classes may also be delivered through interactive television and in person. Three degrees and 12 concentrations are available.

== Campus ==
The campus is located on 500 acres of former sugarcane land. The campus's property includes a separate 991-acre parcel located above the H-1 Freeway.

== Athletics ==
UHWO features an intramural sports program. The program is available to all enrolled students. The program includes of five sports including: flag football, volleyball, basketball, soccer and softball. The school's mascot is the pueo, an owl native to Hawaii.

== Chancellors ==
- Carlos Peñaloza (Interim) 2026–Present
- Maenette K.P. Benham, 2017–2025
- Rockne C. Freitas, 2013–2016
