= Pacific West Conference men's basketball tournament =

- Conference basketball championship
- Sport: Basketball
- Conference: Pacific West Conference
- Number of teams: 6
- Format: Single-elimination tournament
- Current location: Honolulu, HI
- Played: 2013–present
- Current champion: Point Loma Nazarene (5th)
- Most championships: Point Loma Nazarene (5)
- Official website: PWC men's basketball

The Pacific West Conference men's basketball tournament is the annual conference basketball championship tournament for the Pacific West Conference (PacWest). The tournament has been held annually since 2013. It is a single-elimination tournament and seeding is based on regular season records.

The winner receives the PacWest's automatic bid to the NCAA Men's Division II Basketball Championship.

== Results ==
| Year | Champions | Score | Runner-up | Venue |
|---|---|---|---|---|
| 2013 | Dixie State | 92–80 | Chaminade | Azusa, CA |
| 2014 | Chaminade | 99–83 | Dominican | San Diego, CA |
| 2015 | BYU Hawaii | 84–79 | California Baptist | Irvine, CA |
| 2016 | California Baptist | 101–64 | Azusa Pacific | Irvine, CA |
| 2017 | Hawaii Pacific | 83–73 | Point Loma Nazarene | Irvine, CA |
| 2018 | Dixie State | 66–64 | California Baptist | Riverside, CA |
| 2019 | Point Loma Nazarene | 67-58 | Concordia Irvine | San Rafael, CA |
| 2020 | Point Loma Nazarene | 98–95 (OT) | Biola | Azusa, CA |
| 2021 | Cancelled due to the COVID-19 pandemic | | | |
| 2022 | Academy of Art | 73–70 | Azusa Pacific | Fresno, CA |
| 2023 | Point Loma Nazarene | 80–69 | Azusa Pacific | Honolulu, HI |
| 2024 | Azusa Pacific | 78–66 | Point Loma Nazarene | San Diego, CA |
| 2025 | Point Loma Nazarene | 67–64 | Academy of Arts | San Rafael, CA |
| 2026 | Point Loma Nazarene | 94–69 | Westmont | San Diego, CA |

== Championship records ==
| School | Finals Record | Finals Appearances | Championship Years |
|---|---|---|---|
| Point Loma Nazarene | 5–2 | 7 | 2019, 2020, 2023, 2025, 2026 |
| Utah Tech (Dixie State) | 2–0 | 2 | 2013, 2018 |
| Azusa Pacific | 1–3 | 4 | 2024 |
| California Baptist | 1–2 | 3 | 2016 |
| Academy of Art | 1–1 | 2 | 2022 |
| Chaminade | 1–1 | 2 | 2014 |
| Hawaii Pacific | 1–0 | 1 | 2017 |
| BYU Hawaii | 1–0 | 1 | 2015 |
| Biola | 0–1 | 1 | |
| Concordia Irvine | 0–1 | 1 | |
| Dominican | 0–1 | 1 | |
| Westmont | 0–1 | 1 | |

- Fresno Pacific, Hawaii–Hilo, Jessup, Menlo, and Vanguard have not yet qualified for the PacWest tournament finals.
- Grand Canyon, Holy Names, and Notre Dame de Namur never qualified for the tournament finals before departing the PacWest.
- Schools highlighted in pink are former PacWest members.

== See also ==
- Pacific West Conference women's basketball tournament
