= 2012–13 BYU–Hawaii Seasiders men's basketball team =

American college basketball season

2012–13 BYU–Hawaii Seasiders men's basketball
- Conference: Pacific West Conference
- Record: 16–11 (12–6 Pac West)
- Head coach: Ken Wagner (23rd season)
- Assistant coach: David Evans
- Home arena: George Q. Cannon Activities Center

2012–13 Pacific West Conference men's basketball standings
	Conf.				Overall
Team	W		L	PCT	W		L	PCT
x- Dixie State	15	–	3	.833	21	–	6	.778
Fresno Pacific*	14	–	4	.778	20	–	7	.741
x- Grand Canyon	14	–	4	.778	23	–	7	.767
x- Chaminade	14	–	4	.778	19	–	9	.679
x-Dominican	12	–	6	.667	16	–	11	.593
x- BYU–Hawaii	12	–	6	.667	16	–	11	.593
Azusa Pacific*	9	–	8	.529	13	–	14	.481
Cal Baptist*	8	–	10	.444	14	–	13	.519
x- Hawaii Pacific	7	–	11	.389	10	–	16	.385
Academy of Art	7	–	11	.389	9	–	16	.360
Notre Dame de Namur	5	–	13	.278	6	–	20	.231
Hawaii–Hilo	4	–	13	.235	6	–	19	.240
Holy Names*	2	–	16	.111	5	–	21	.192
Point Loma Nazarene*	2	–	16	.111	5	–	21	.192
† 2013 Pac West Conference men's basketball tournament winner As of March 8, 2013; Rankings from NABC; *Transitioning from NAIA and ineligible for NCAA and Pac West tournament x-Qualified for Pac West tournament

The 2012–13 BYU-Hawaiʻi Seasiders men's basketball team represented BYU-Hawaiʻi in the 2012–13 NCAA Division II college basketball season. It was head coach Ken Wagner's twenty-third season at BYU-Hawaiʻi. The Seasiders are members of the Pacific West Conference and played their home games at the George Q. Cannon Activities Center. The Seasiders finished the season 16–11. They qualified for the first ever Pac West Tournament, where they lost in the semi-finals to Dixie State.

== 2012–13 media ==
The Seasiders had every home game televised in various fashions. All home games were shown on BYUtv Sports or on the BYU-Hawaiʻi Seasiders Livestream Channel. All road games had an internet audio broadcast available through BYU-Hawaiʻi Radio, and some road games were streamed online through the opposition's online video providers.

== Recruiting ==
Name	Pos.	Height	Weight	Year	Hometown	notes
Solomone Wolfgramm	G	6'4"	235	Freshman	Palo Alto, California	Joins out of Pinewood High.
DeAndre Medlock	F/C	6'10"	215	Junior	Fresno, California	Joins out of Fresno City College
Tanner Nelson	G	6'3"	XXX	Freshman	Camas, Washington	Will serve LDS mission and join in 2014-15 season
Cory Lange	G	6'2"	XXX	Freshman	Tehachapi, California	Will serve LDS mission and join in 2014-15 season

== Roster ==
2012–13 BYU–Hawaii Seasiders men's basketball team
Players
Coaches

Pos.	#	Name	Height	Weight	Year	Hometown
G	1	Pablo Coro	6 ft 3 in (1.91 m)	190 lb (86 kg)	So	Osorno, Chile
G	2	Robbie Mitchell	5 ft 9 in (1.75 m)	165 lb (75 kg)	So	Kennewick, Washington
F	3	SeQuan Lawrence	6 ft 7 in (2.01 m)	190 lb (86 kg)	Jr	Waldorf, Maryland
G	4	B. J. Ford	6 ft 2 in (1.88 m)	175 lb (79 kg)	RS Fr	Payson, Utah
F	5	Solomone Wolfgramm	6 ft 4 in (1.93 m)	235 lb (107 kg)	Fr	Palo Alto, California
G	10	Okesene Ale Jr.	6 ft 2 in (1.88 m)	170 lb (77 kg)	Sr	Hauʻula, Hawaii
G	14	Brody Berry	6 ft 1 in (1.85 m)	175 lb (79 kg)	Fr	Highland, Utah
F/C	22	DeAndre Medlock	6 ft 10 in (2.08 m)	215 lb (98 kg)	Jr	Fresno, California
G	23	Brandon Reeves	6 ft 3 in (1.91 m)	160 lb (73 kg)	Fr	Highland, Utah
G/F	24	Nkosi Stewart	6 ft 7 in (2.01 m)	170 lb (77 kg)	Jr	Saint Vincent, California
G	32	Dae Sung Lee	6 ft 4 in (1.93 m)	185 lb (84 kg)	Sr	Korea
G	33	Taylor Maughan	6 ft 2 in (1.88 m)	175 lb (79 kg)	Fr	Fullerton, California
F	44	Brady Hurst	6 ft 8 in (2.03 m)	225 lb (102 kg)	Sr	Farmington, Utah
F	45	Bracken Funk	6 ft 7 in (2.01 m)	240 lb (109 kg)	Jr	Highland, Utah
F	50	Justin Park	6 ft 6 in (1.98 m)	185 lb (84 kg)	Fr	Mesa, Arizona

Head coach

- Ken Wagner (BYU)

Assistant coach(es)

- David Evans (BYU-Hawaiʻi)

Legend

- (C) Team captain
- (S) Suspended
- (I) Ineligible
- (W) Walk-on
- Injured
- Current redshirt

== Schedule ==
Date time, TV	Rank^{#}	Opponent^{#}	Result	Record	Site city, state
Exhibition
11/		{{{opponent}}}			{{{site_stadium}}} {{{site_cityst}}}
11/09/2012*; 8:00 pm		New Zealand Maori; American Money Group Asia Pacific Tournament	W 93–85	-	George Q. Cannon Activities Center; Laie, HI
Regular Season
11/12/2012*; 7:30 pm, BYUtv		No. 6 Western Washington	L 78–84	0–1	George Q. Cannon Activities Center; Laie, HI
11/16/2012*; 7:30 pm, BYUtv		Central Washington; GNAC/Pac West Challenge	L 83–88	0–2	George Q. Cannon Activities Center; Laie, HI
11/17/2012*; 7:30 pm, BYU-Hawaiʻi Livestream		No. 9 Seattle Pacific; GNAC/Pac West Challenge	L 54–71	0–3	George Q. Cannon Activities Center; Laie, HI
11/20/2012*; 7:30 pm, BYU-Hawaiʻi Livestream		Oakland City	W 123–84	1–3	George Q. Cannon Activities Center; Laie, HI
11/23/2012*; 7:30 pm, BYU-Hawaiʻi Livestream		Montana State-Billings	W 97–92	2–3	George Q. Cannon Activities Center; Laie, HI
12/01/2012; 2:30 pm, BYU-Hawaiʻi Livestream		Hawaiʻi Pacific	W 83–74	3–3 (1–0)	George Q. Cannon Activities Center; Laie, HI
12/08/2012*; 7:30 pm, BYU-Hawaiʻi Livestream		Urbana (OH)	W 103–88	4–3	George Q. Cannon Activities Center; Laie, HI
12/13/2012*; 7:30 pm, BYU-Hawaiʻi Livestream		Cedarville	L 76–81	4–4	George Q. Cannon Activities Center; Laie, HI
12/15/2012*; 2:00 pm, BigWest.TV		at Long Beach State	L 65–82	4–5	Walter Pyramid; Long Beach, CA
01/03/2013; 7:30 pm, BYU-Hawaiʻi Livestream		Holy Names	W 94–75	5–5 (2–0)	George Q. Cannon Activities Center; Laie, HI
01/05/2013; 7:30 pm, BYU-Hawaiʻi Livestream		Notre Dame de Namur	W 76–66	6–5 (3–0)	George Q. Cannon Activities Center; Laie, HI
01/07/2013; 7:30 pm, BYUtv		Academy of Art	W 107–70	7–5 (4–0)	George Q. Cannon Activities Center; Laie, HI
01/14/2013; 5:30 pm, Dominican Stretch TV		at Dominican	L 75–80	7–6 (4–1)	Conlan Center; San Rafael, CA
01/16/2013; 5:30 pm, Hawks Sports onDemand		at Holy Names	W 94–68	8–6 (5–1)	Tobin Gymnasium; Oakland, CA
01/19/2013; 5:30 pm, America One		at Notre Dame de Namur	W 73–56	9–6 (6–1)	Walter Gleasen Gymnasium; Belmont, CA
01/21/2013; 5:30 pm, Fresno Pacific Stretch TV		at Fresno Pacific	L 83–92	9–7 (6–2)	Special Events Center; Fresno, CA
01/26/2013; 7:30 pm, Hawaiʻi-Hilo on Boxcast		at Hawaiʻi-Hilo	L 76–77	9–8 (6–3)	Afook-Chinen Civic Center; Hilo, HI
02/02/2013; 7:30 pm, BYUtv		Chaminade	L 81–87	9–9 (6–4)	George Q. Cannon Activities Center; Laie, HI
02/05/2013; 7:30 pm, HPU Stretch TV		at Hawaiʻi Pacific	W 85–84 ^{OT}	10–9 (7–4)	Blaisdell Center; Honolulu, HI
02/09/2013; 7:30 pm		at Chaminade	L 64–75	10–10 (7–5)	McCabe Gymnasium; Honolulu, HI
02/11/2013; 7:30 pm, BYUtv		Point Loma Nazarene	W 75–49	11–10 (8–5)	George Q. Cannon Activities Center; Laie, HI
02/14/2013; 7:30 pm, BYUtv		Cal Baptist	W 89–73	12–10 (9–5)	George Q. Cannon Activities Center; Laie, HI
02/18/2013; 7:30 pm, BYUtv		Azusa Pacific	W 77–69	13–10 (10–5)	George Q. Cannon Activities Center; Laie, HI
02/23/2013; 4:30 pm, CEC-TV		at No. 25 Dixie State	W 80–75	14–10 (11–5)	Burns Arena; St. George, UT
02/26/2013; 4:30 pm, Grand Canyon Sidearm Sports		at Grand Canyon	L 73–75 ^{OT}	14–11 (11–6)	GCU Events Center; Phoenix, AZ
03/01/2013; 7:30 pm, BYU-Hawaiʻi Livestream		Hawaiʻi-Hilo	W 91–86	15–11 (12–6)	George Q. Cannon Activities Center; Laie, HI
2013 Pacific West Conference Tournament
03/07/2013; 6:00 pm, Pac West TV		vs. No. 4-seed Dominican; Pac-West Quarterfinals	W 65–64	16–11	Felix Events Center; Azusa, CA
03/07/2013; 6:30 pm, Pac West TV		vs. No. 1-seed Dixie State; Pac-West Semifinals			Felix Events Center; Azusa, CA
*Non-conference game. ^{#}Rankings from NABC. (#) Tournament seedings in parentheses.

== Game summaries ==
=== Exhibition: Ningbo University ===
Series History: First Meeting

Nov 7
8:00 pm

Recap

Ningbo 58, BYU-Hawaiʻi Seasiders 90
Scoring by half: 23-35, 44-46
Pts: Li Bin & Li Xiaolong 15; Rebs: Li Xialong 7 Asts: Li Bin, Sun Xianliang, & Li Fan 2	Pts: BJ Ford & DeAndre Medlock 14; Rebs: DeAndre Medlock 6 Asts: Dae Sung Lee 9

George Q. Cannon Activities Center
Laie, HI
Attendance: 325
Referees: Todd Apo, Tony Collazo, Mike Berry

=== Exhibition: New Zealand Maori ===
Nov 9
8:15 pm

Recap

New Zealand Maori 85, BYU-Hawaiʻi Seasiders 93
Scoring by half: 48-47, 37-46
Pts: Lindsay Tait 23; Rebs: Lindsay Tait 7 Asts: Lindsay Tait & Paora Winitana 5	Pts: Okesene Ale 20; Rebs: Bracken Funk 22; Asts: Bracken Funk 5

George Q. Cannon Activities Center
Laie, HI
Attendance: 875
Referees: Kirk Hottendorf, Kayne Gutierrez, Mike Whitfield

=== #6 Western Washington ===
Broadcasters: Lad Panis and Dave Porter

BYUtv

Nov 12
7:30 pm

Recap

#6 Western Washington Vikings 84, BYU-Hawaiʻi Seasiders 78
Scoring by half: 38-38, 46-40
Pts: Paul Jones & Austin Bragg 19; Rebs: Chris Mitchell 5 Asts: Rico Wilkins 4	Pts: DeAndre Medlcok 27; Rebs: Okesene Ale & Bracken Funk 10; Asts: Okesene Ale 7

George Q. Cannon Activities Center
Laie, HI
Attendance: 572
Referees: Mike Berry, Kayne Gutierrez, Mike Saito

=== Central Washington ===
Broadcasters: Lad Panis and Dave Porter

BYUtv

Nov 16
7:30 pm

Recap

Central Washington Wildcats 88, BYU-Hawaiʻi Seasiders 83
Scoring by half: 39-37, 49-46
Pts: Dom Williams 21; Rebs: Brandon Magee 8 Asts: Jordan Starr 3	Pts: DeAndre Medlock 26; Rebs: DeAndre Medlock 8 Asts: Okesene Ale 6

George Q. Cannon Activities Center
Laie, HI
Attendance: 910
Referees: Todd Apo, Eric Morales, Ryan Wells

=== #9 Seattle Pacific ===
Broadcasters: Lad Panis and Dave Porter

BYU-Hawaiʻi Livestream

Nov 17
7:30 pm

Recap

#9 Seattle Pacific Falcons 71, BYU-Hawaiʻi Seasiders 54
Scoring by half: 38-38, 46-40
Pts: David Downs 14; Rebs: Scott Morse 9 Asts: David Downs 6	Pts: Bracken Funk 10; Rebs: Bracken Funk, Robbie Mitchell, & Solomone Wolfgramm 4 Asts: Robbie Mitchell 6

George Q. Cannon Activities Center
Laie, HI
Attendance: N/A
Referees: Ryan Wells, Champ Johnson, Dan Coda

=== Oakland City ===
Broadcasters: Lad Panis and Dave Porter

BYU-Hawaiʻi Livestream

Nov 20
7:30 pm

Recap

Oakland City Mighty Oaks 84, BYU-Hawaiʻi Seasiders 123
Scoring by half: 31-64, 53-59
Pts: Mitch Stahl 28; Rebs: Mitch Stahl 7 Asts: Mitch Stahl 4	Pts: Okesene Ale, Bracken Funk, & BJ Ford 16; Rebs: Bracken Funk 13; Asts: Pablo Coro 5

George Q. Cannon Activities Center
Laie, HI
Attendance: 532
Referees: Tom Yoshida, Eric Morales, Kirk Hottendorf

=== Montana State-Billings ===
Broadcasters: Lad Panis and Dave Porter

BYU-Hawaiʻi Livestream

Nov 23
7:30 pm

Recap

Montana State- Billings Yellowjackets 92, BYU-Hawaiʻi Seasiders 97
Scoring by half: 45-43, 47-54
Pts: David Arnold 22; Rebs: Robby Trabing 9 Asts: Kalob Hatcher 7	Pts: Okesene Ale 23; Rebs: DeAndre Medlock 9 Asts: Okesene Ale & Pablo Coro 4

George Q. Cannon Activities Center
Laie, HI
Attendance: 235
Referees: Todd Apo, Mike Whitfield, Tony Collazo

=== Hawaiʻi Pacific ===
Broadcasters: Lad Panis and Dave Porter

BYU-Hawaiʻi Livestream

Dec 1
2:30 pm

Recap

Hawaiʻi Sea Warriors 74, BYU-Hawaiʻi Seasiders 83
Scoring by half: 26-31, 48-52
Pts: Jelany White 21; Rebs: Marko Cukic 7 Asts: Jelany White 5	Pts: Pablo Coro 17; Rebs: Bracken Funk 7 Asts: Okesene Ale 6

George Q. Cannon Activities Center
Laie, HI
Attendance: 250
Referees: Ryan Wells, Champ Johnson, Tony Collazo

=== Urbana (OH) ===
Broadcasters: Lad Panis and Dave Porter

BYU-Hawaiʻi Livestream

Dec 8
7:30 pm

Recap

Urbana Blue Knights 103, BYU-Hawaiʻi Seasiders 88
Scoring by half: 50-35, 53-53
Pts: Armond Battle 31; Rebs: Ognjen Rebic, Casey Baker, & Armond Battle 5 Asts: Ramel Mitchell 3	Pts: Okesene Ale 21; Rebs: Solomone Wolfgramm 9 Asts: Pablo Coro 8

George Q. Cannon Activities Center
Laie, HI
Attendance: 412
Referees: Tom Yoshida, Dan Coda, Mike Berry

=== At Long Beach State ===
Broadcaster: Lad Panis (BYU-Hawaiʻi Radio)/ Rob Brender (BigWest.TV & Long Beach State on Stretch)

BigWest.TV

Dec 15
2:05 pm

Recap

BYU-Hawaiʻi Seasiders 65, Long Beach State 49ers 82
Scoring by half: 32-43, 33-39
Pts: Bracken Funk 15; Rebs: Justin Park 6 Asts: Pablo Coro 5	Pts: James Ennis 29; Rebs: James Ennis 15; Asts: Kris Gulley 5

Walter Pyramid
Long Beach, CA
Attendance: 2,420
Referees: Jeff Ketchum, Brady Chelette, Martin Cichocki

=== Holy Names ===
Broadcasters: Lad Panis and Dave Porter

BYU-Hawaiʻi Livestream

Jan 3
7:30 pm

Recap

Holy Names Hawks 75, BYU-Hawaiʻi Seasiders 94
Scoring by half: 31-43, 44-51
Pts: Ian Collins 22; Rebs: Tyler Fry 5 Asts: Joshua Crum 6	Pts: BJ Ford 24; Rebs: Bracken Funk 15; Asts: Pablo Coro 8

George Q. Cannon Activities Center
Laie, HI
Attendance: 235
Referees: Ryan Wells, Kirk Hottendorf, Mark Beasley

=== Notre Dame de Namur ===
Broadcasters: Lad Panis and Dave Porter

BYU-Hawaiʻi Livestream

Jan 5
7:30 pm

Recap

Notre Dame de Namur Argonauts 66, BYU-Hawaiʻi Seasiders 76
Scoring by half: 28-37, 38-39
Pts: Wesley White 17; Rebs: Wesley White 10; Asts: Simon Enciso 6	Pts: DeAndre Medlock 31; Rebs: Bracken Funk 7 Asts: Pablo Coro 6

George Q. Cannon Activities Center
Laie, HI
Attendance: 330
Referees: Todd Apo, Eric Morales, Tom Yoshida

=== Academy of Art ===
Broadcasters: Lad Panis and Dave Porter

BYUtv

Jan 7
7:30 pm

Recap

Academy of Art Urban Knights 70, BYU-Hawaiʻi Seasiders 107
Scoring by half: 28-55, 42-52
Pts: Ameer Shamsud-din 19; Rebs: Mike Jorritsma & Andre Gray 5 Asts: Bryan Fisher 9	Pts: Okesene Ale 21; Rebs: Bracken Funk, Solomone Wolfgram, SeQuan Lawrence, & Justin Park 6 Asts: Dae Sung Lee 6

George Q. Cannon Activities Center
Laie, HI
Attendance: 612
Referees: Maurice Brazelton, Mike Berry, Champ Johnson

=== At Dominican ===
Broadcaster: Lad Panis (BYU-Hawaiʻi Radio)/ Stuart Horne and Patrick Cayabyab (Dominican on Stretch & Dominican Radio)

Dominican Stretch TV

Jan 14
5:30 pm

Recap

BYU-Hawaiʻi Seasiders 75, Dominican Penguins 80
Scoring by half: 45-45, 30-35
Pts: Okesene Ale 14; Rebs: Okesene Ale 10; Asts: Okesene Ale & Pablo Coro 2	Pts: Jamall Clark 13; Rebs: Jacob Noisat 12; Asts: Matt Hayes 4

Conlan Center
San Rafael, CA
Attendance: 186
Referees: Sam Haddad, Horace Shields, Coban Lopez

=== At Holy Names ===
Broadcaster: Lad Panis (BYU-Hawaii Radio)/ Wendell Tull (Hawk Sports onDemand)

Hawks Sports onDemand

Jan 16
5:30 pm

Recap

BYU-Hawaiʻi Seasiders 94, Holy Names Hawks 68
Scoring by half: 50-36, 44-32
Pts: DeAndre Medlock 22; Rebs: SeQuan Lawrence 9 Asts: SeQuan Lawrence 5	Pts: Joshua Crum 14; Rebs: Blake Watkins 5 Asts: Dale Dalton 2

Tobin Gymnasium
Oakland, CA
Attendance: 100
Referees: Melvin Landry, Dennis Flannery Jr, Ryan McCarty

=== At Notre Dame de Namur ===
Broadcaster: Lad Panis (BYU-Hawaiʻi Radio)/ ??? (America One)

America One

Jan 19
5:30 pm

Recap

BYU-Hawaiʻi Seasiders 73, Notre Dame de Namur Argonauts 56
Scoring by half: 31-31, 42-25
Pts: BJ Ford 26; Rebs: Bracken Funk 13; Asts: Pablo Coro 6	Pts: Micah Dunhour 15; Rebs: Micah Dunhour 9 Asts: Geoff Hartman 3

Walter Gleasen Gymnasium
Belmont, CA
Attendance: 240
Referees: Not listed

=== At Fresno Pacific ===
Broadcaster: Lad Panis (BYU-Hawaiʻi Radio)/ Christian Lukens and Rick Bough (Fresno Pacific on Stretch)

Fresno Pacific Stretch TV

Jan 21
5:30 pm

Recap

BYU-Hawaiʻi Seasiders 83, Fresno Pacific Sunbirds 92
Scoring by half: 43-33, 40-59
Pts: DeAndre Medlock 24; Rebs: Bracken Funk 11; Asts: Pablo Coro 6	Pts: John Taylor 37; Rebs: Antonio Credit 13; Asts: Malcolm Griffin 9

Special Events Center
Fresno, CA
Attendance: 506
Referees: Not listed

=== At Hawaiʻi-Hilo ===
Broadcaster: Lad Panis (BYU-Hawaiʻi Radio)/ Josh Pacheco and Stan Costales (Hawaiʻi- Hilo on Boxcast & ESPN Hawaiʻi- KHLO & KKON)

Hawaiʻi-Hilo on Boxcast

Jan 26
7:30 pm

Recap

BYU-Hawaiʻi Seasiders 76, Hawaiʻi- Hilo Vulcans 77
Scoring by half: 39-38, 37-39
Pts: Taylor Maughan 14; Rebs: Bracken Funk 9 Asts: Bracken Funk 3	Pts: CJ Brown 22; Rebs: Derek Owens 5 Asts: Paul Bautasa 4

Afook-Chinen Civic Center
Hilo, HI
Attendance: 586
Referees: Todd Apo, Eric Morales, Ryan Wells

=== Chaminade ===
Broadcasters: Lad Panis and Dave Porter

BYUtv

Feb 2
7:30 pm

Recap

Chaminade Silverswords 87, BYU-Hawaiʻi Seasiders 81
Scoring by half: 37-48, 50-33
Pts: De'Andre Haskins 29; Rebs: Dominique Cooks, Bennie Murray, Waly Coulibaly, & De'Andre Haskins 6 Asts: Lee Bailey 11	Pts: Pablo Coro 18; Rebs: Bracken Funk 8 Asts: Pablo Coro 7

George Q. Cannon Activities Center
Laie, HI
Attendance: 985
Referees: Ryan Wells, Dan Coda, Mike Berry

=== At Hawaiʻi Pacific ===
Broadcaster: Lad Panis (BYU-Hawaiʻi Radio)/ Brent Curry (HPU on Stretch)

HPU Stretch TV

Feb 5
7:30 pm

Recap

BYU-Hawaiʻi Seasiders 85, Hawaiʻi- Pacific Seawolves 84 (OT)
Scoring by half: 33-26, 39-46 Overtime: 13-12
Pts: Okesene Ale 22; Rebs: Okesene Ale 10; Asts: Pablo Coro 6	Pts: Malte Zigenhagen 32; Rebs: Marko Cukic 5 Asts: Malte Zigenhagen 5

Blaisdell Center
Honolulu, HI
Attendance: 308

=== At Chaminade ===
Broadcaster: Lad Panis (BYU-Hawaiʻi Radio)/ Felipe Orozco (GoSwords.com)

Feb 9
7:30 pm

Recap

BYU-Hawaiʻi Seasiders 64, Chaminade Silverswords 75
Scoring by half: 31-41, 33-34
Pts: Okesene Ale 22; Rebs: Bracken Funk 11; Asts: Pablo Coro and Okesene Ale 4	Pts: Bennie Murray 18; Rebs: De'Andre Haskins 12; Asts: Lee Bailey and Bennie Murray 3

McCabe Gymnasium
Honolulu, HI
Attendance: 196
Referees: Todd Apo, Dan Coda, Thomas Yoshida

=== Point Loma Nazarene ===
Broadcasters: Lad Panis and Dave Porter

BYUtv

Feb 11
7:30 pm

Recap

Point Loma Nazarene Sea Lions 49, BYU-Hawaiʻi Seasiders 75
Scoring by half: 29-31, 20-44
Pts: AJ Ussery 14; Rebs: AJ Ussery 10; Asts: Taylor Wetherell & AJ Ussery 3	Pts: Okesene Ale 26; Rebs: Bracken Funk 12; Asts: Pablo Coro 5

George Q. Cannon Activities Center
Laie, HI
Attendance: 795
Referees: Ryan Wells, Mike Berry, Champ Johnson

=== Cal Baptist ===
Broadcasters: Lad Panis and Scott Lowe

BYUtv

Feb 14
7:30 pm

Recap

Cal Baptist Lancers 73, BYU-Hawaiʻi Seasiders 89
Scoring by half: 33-46, 40-43
Pts: Andrew Fisk 21; Rebs: Luke Evams 4 Asts: Anthony Cosentino 3	Pts: Pablo Coro 24; Rebs: Bracken Funk 13; Asts: Robbie Mitchell 10

George Q. Cannon Activities Center
Laie, HI
Attendance: 531
Referees: Coban Lopez, Jeff Wells, Michael Saito

=== Azusa Pacific ===
Broadcasters: Lad Panis and Dave Porter

BYUtv

Feb 18
7:30 pm

Recap

Azusa Pacific Cougars 69, BYU-Hawaiʻi Seasiders 77
Scoring by half: 38-36, 31-41
Pts: Troy Leaf 15; Rebs: Sharif Watson 12; Asts: Troy Leaf 6	Pts: Pablo Coro 6 Rebs: DeAndre Medlock 6 Asts: Robbie Mitchell 9

George Q. Cannon Activities Center
Laie, HI
Attendance: 579
Referees: Ryan Wells, Tony Collazo, Tom Yoshida

=== At Dixie State ===
Broadcaster: Lad Panis (BYU-Hawaiʻi Radio)/ Parker Craycroft, Kylee Young, and Taylor Deckard (CEC-TV), John Potter (ESPN 1210 AM, 102.3 FM, & 107.3 FM- KXFF)

CEC-TV

Feb 23
4:30 pm

Recap

BYU-Hawaiʻi Seasiders 80, #25 Dixie State Red Storm 75
Scoring by half: 40-40, 40-35
Pts: DeAndre Medlock 23; Rebs: DeAndre Medlock & Brady Hurst 6 Asts: Robbie Mitchell 5	Pts: Zach Robbins 22; Rebs: Zach Robbins 11; Asts: Kimball Payne 6

Burns Arena
St. George, UT
Attendance: 4,602
Referees: Michael Cheathan, Chad Shepherd, Randy Richardson

=== At Grand Canyon ===
Broadcaster: Lad Panis (BYU-Hawaiʻi Radio)/ Michael Potter and Dan Nichols (GCULopes.com & Grand Canyon Sidearm Sports)

Grand Canyon Sidearm Sports

Feb 26
4:30 pm

Recap

BYU-Hawaiʻi Seasiders 73, Grand Canyon Antelopes 75 (OT)
Scoring by half: 31-32, 36-35 Overtime: 6-8
Pts: Okesene Ale 21; Rebs: Bracken Funk 8 Asts: Robbie Mitchell 5	Pts: Killian Larson 17; Rebs: Killian Larson 17; Asts: Joshua Lowery 4

GCU Events Center
Phoenix, AZ
Attendance: 3,165
Referees: Glen Mayberry, Marc Beasley, Aaron Schlessinger

=== Hawaiʻi-Hilo ===
Broadcasters: Lad Panis and Dave Porter

BYU-Hawaiʻi Livestream

Mar 1
7:30 pm

Recap

Hawaiʻi-Hilo Vulcans 86, BYU-Hawaiʻi Seasiders 91
Scoring by half: 39-45, 47-46
Pts: Mychael Hearn 22; Rebs: Michael Melanos 5 Asts: CJ Brown 5	Pts: Okesene Ale 26; Rebs: Robbie Mitchell 4 Asts: Robbie Mitchell 10

George Q. Cannon Activities Center
Laie, HI
Attendance: 1,932
Referees: Ryan Wells, Eric Morales, Tom Yoshida

=== Pac-West Quarterfinals: vs. 4-seed Dominican ===
Broadcaster: Lad Panis (BYU-Hawaiʻi Radio)

Pac West TV

Mar 7
6:00 pm

Recap

Dominican Penguins 64, BYU-Hawaiʻi Seasiders 65
Scoring by half: 30-36, 34-29
Pts: Devin Golston 14; Rebs: Jacob Noisat 11; Asts: Myles Carrillo 4	Pts: Okesene Ale 24; Rebs: Bracken Funk 8 Asts: Robbie Mitchell, Pablo Coro, & Brody Berry 3

Felix Events Center
Azusa, CA
Attendance: 581
Referees: Levon Zakarian, Martin Cichoki, Ernest Kelley III

=== Pac-West Semi-finals: vs. 1-seed Dixie State ===
Broadcaster: Lad Panis (BYU-Hawaiʻi Radio)

Pac West TV

Mar 8
6:00 pm

Recap

BYU-Hawaiʻi Seasiders 59, Dixie State Red Storm 71
Scoring by half: 37-31, 22-40
Pts: Pablo Coro 15; Rebs: Bracken Funk 13; Asts: Robbie Mitchell 5	Pts: De'Quan Thompson 18; Rebs: Steven Larson 10; Asts: Kimball Payne 6

Felix Events Center
Azusa, CA
Attendance: 581
Referees: Bruce Hicks, Cameron Patton, Rob Rorke
