= Pacific West Conference women's basketball tournament =

- Conference basketball championship
- Sport: Basketball
- Conference: Pacific West Conference
- Number of teams: 6
- Format: Single-elimination tournament
- Current stadium: Campus venues
- Played: 2013–present
- Current champion: Vanguard (1st)
- Most championships: Azusa Pacific (4); Hawaii Pacific (4)
- Official website: PacWest women's basketball

The Pacific West Conference women's basketball tournament is the annual conference women's basketball championship tournament for the Pacific West Conference (PacWest). The tournament has been held annually since 2013. It is a single-elimination tournament and seeding is based on regular season records.

The winner receives the conference's automatic bid to the NCAA Women's Division II Basketball Championship.

== Results ==
Year	Champions	Score	Runner-up	Venue
2013	Academy of Art	75–49	Hawaii Pacific	Azusa, CA
2014	Academy of Art	88–76	California Baptist	San Diego, CA
2015	Hawaii Pacific	74–73	California Baptist	Irvine, CA
2016	Azusa Pacific	75–58	California Baptist	Irvine, CA
2017	California Baptist	80–72	Point Loma Nazarene	Irvine, CA
2018	Hawaii Pacific	77–71	Point Loma Nazarene	Riverside, CA
2019	Hawaii Pacific	75–68	Azusa Pacific	San Rafael, CA
2020	Hawaii Pacific	68–57	Azusa Pacific	Azusa, CA
2021	Cancelled due to the COVID-19 pandemic			
2022	Azusa Pacific	60–49	Academy of Art	Fresno, CA
2023	Azusa Pacific	76–65	Concordia Irvine	Honolulu, HI
2024	Azusa Pacific	72–67 (OT)	Fresno Pacific	San Diego, CA
2025	Point Loma	58–51	Dominican	San Rafael, CA
2026	Vanguard	61–47	Azusa Pacific	San Diego, CA

== Championship records ==
School	Finals Record	Finals Appearances	Championship Years
Azusa Pacific	4–3	7	2016, 2022, 2023, 2024
Hawaii Pacific	4–1	5	2015, 2018, 2019, 2020
Academy of Art	2–1	3	2013, 2014
California Baptist	1–3	4	2017
Point Loma	1–2	3	2025
Vanguard	1–0	1	2026
Fresno Pacific	0–1	1	
Concordia Irvine	0–1	1	

- Biola, Chaminade, Hawaii–Hilo, Jessup, Menlo, and Westmont have not yet qualified for the PacWest tournament finals.
- BYU–Hawaii, Dixie State, Grand Canyon, Holy Names, and Notre Dame de Namur never qualified for the tournament finals before departing the PacWest.
- Schools highlighted in pink are former PacWest members.

== See also ==
- Pacific West Conference men's basketball tournament
