= 2013–14 BYU–Hawaii Seasiders men's basketball team =

American college basketball season

2013–14 BYU–Hawaii Seasiders men's basketball
- Conference: Pacific West Conference
- Record: 15–11 (13–7 PacWest)
- Head coach: Ken Wagner (24th season)
- Assistant coaches: David Evans (3rd season); Sarah Xu (1st season)
- Home arena: George Q. Cannon Activities Center

2013–14 Pacific West Conference men's basketball standings
	Conf.				Overall
Team	W		L	PCT	W		L	PCT
y- #7 Cal Baptist	18	–	2	.900	24	–	2	.923
x- Dominican	15	–	5	.750	21	–	7	.750
x- Dixie State	15	–	5	.750	21	–	5	.808
Azusa Pacific*	13	–	7	.650	17	–	9	.654
x- BYU–Hawaii	13	–	7	.650	15	–	11	.577
x- Chaminade	13	–	7	.650	16	–	12	.571
Point Loma Nazarene*	10	–	10	.500	16	–	11	.593
x- Hawaii Pacific	9	–	11	.450	14	–	12	.538
Fresno Pacific*	6	–	14	.300	11	–	17	.393
Notre Dame de Namur	6	–	14	.300	7	–	19	.269
Hawaii Hilo	4	–	16	.200	7	–	19	.269
Academy of Art	4	–	16	.200	6	–	21	.222
Holy Names*	4	–	16	.200	5	–	23	.179
† 2014 Pac West Conference men's basketball tournament winner As of March 5, 2014, 2014; Rankings from NABC; *Transitioning from NAIA and ineligible for NCAA and Pac West tournament x-Qualified for Pac West tournament y-Clinched Pac West Regular Season Title z-Clinched Pac West tournament Title

The 2013–14 BYU–Hawaiʻi Seasiders men's basketball team represented BYU-Hawaiʻi in the 2013–14 NCAA Division II college basketball season. This was head coach Ken Wagner's twenty-fourth season at BYU-Hawaiʻi. The Seasiders were members of the Pacific West Conference and played their home games at the George Q. Cannon Activities Center.

== 2013–14 media ==
The Seasiders will have every home game televised in various fashions. All home games will be shown on BYUtv or on the BYU-Hawaiʻi Seasiders Livestream Channel. All road games will have an internet audio broadcast available through BYU-Hawaiʻi Radio, and some road games will be streamed online through the opposition's online video providers. D2 teams can also appear on CBS Sports Network as part of the D2 game of the week.

== Recruiting ==
Name	Pos.	Height	Weight	Year	Hometown	notes
Tyler Tuliau	G	6'5"	210	Junior	Las Vegas, Nevada	Joins out of Long Beach Community College; Attended High School at Cimarron-Memorial.
Justin "LJ" Yamzon	G	5'7"	135	Freshman	Henderson, Nevada	Joins out of Lake Mead Christian Academy
Cory Lange	G	6'2"	XXX	Freshman	Tehachapi, California	Returns after serving a LDS mission
Jerome Harris	G	6'3"	180	Senior	Chicago, Illinois	Joins after attending Olive–Harvey College
Scott Friel	G	6'4"	230	Junior	Riverton, Utah	Return Missionary transfer from Southern Utah

== Roster ==
2013–14 BYU–Hawaii Seasiders men's basketball team
Players
Coaches

Pos.	#	Name	Height	Weight	Year	Previous school	Hometown
G	XX	Gabriel Imbuzelro Andrade (redshirt)	6 ft 1 in (1.85 m)	177 lb (80 kg)	Fr	Anglo-Americano	Rio de Janeiro, Brazil
G	23	Luke Aston	6 ft 7 in (2.01 m)	200 lb (91 kg)	Jr	Otago Boys'	Queenstown, New Zealand
G	1	Pablo Coro	6 ft 3 in (1.91 m)	190 lb (86 kg)	Jr	Juan Diego Catholic	Osorno, Chile
G	4	B. J. Ford	6 ft 2 in (1.88 m)	190 lb (86 kg)	RS So	Payson	Payson, UT
G	12	Scott Friel	6 ft 5 in (1.96 m)	230 lb (104 kg)	So	Riverton; Southern Utah	Riverton, UT
F	45	Bracken Funk	6 ft 8 in (2.03 m)	255 lb (116 kg)	Sr	Lone Peak	Alpine, UT
G	11	Jerome Harris	6 ft 3 in (1.91 m)	175 lb (79 kg)	Jr	George W. Collins	Chicago, IL
G	5	Cory Lange	6 ft 2 in (1.88 m)	190 lb (86 kg)	Fr	Tehachapi	Tehachapi, CA
C	22	DeAndre Medlock	6 ft 10 in (2.08 m)	245 lb (111 kg)	Sr	Clovis West	Fresno, CA
G	2	Robbie Mitchell	5 ft 9 in (1.75 m)	155 lb (70 kg)	Jr	Kennewick	Kennewick, WA
F	20	Jordan Ngatai	6 ft 7 in (2.01 m)	215 lb (98 kg)	So	Sierra College	Porirua, Wellington, New Zealand
G	XX	Perry Rockwood (redshirt)	5 ft 11 in (1.8 m)	170 lb (77 kg)	Fr	Enumclaw	Enumclaw, WA
G	21	Ethan Tsai	6 ft 2 in (1.88 m)	240 lb (109 kg)	Fr	National Taiwan University	Taiwan
F	34	Tyler Tuliau	6 ft 5 in (1.96 m)	225 lb (102 kg)	Jr	Cimarron-Memorial; Long Beach City College	Long Beach, CA
G	10	Justin Yamzon	5 ft 7 in (1.7 m)	170 lb (77 kg)	Fr	Lake Mead Academy	Las Vegas, NV

Head coach

- Ken Wagner (BYU)

Assistant coach(es)

- David Evans (BYU-Hawaiʻi)
- Sarah Xu (Beijing Sport University)

Legend

- (C) Team captain
- (S) Suspended
- (I) Ineligible
- (W) Walk-on
- Injured
- Current redshirt

== Schedule ==
Date time, TV	Rank^{#}	Opponent^{#}	Result	Record	Site city, state
Exhibition
10/31/13*; 7:05 pm		at Hawaiʻi	L 85–101	-	Stan Sheriff Center; Honolulu, HI
11/07/13*; 5:00 pm, BYUH TV		Tahiti; American Money Group Asia Pacific Tournament	W 113–36	-	George Q. Cannon Activities Center; Laie, HI
Regular Season
11/16/2013*; 3:00 pm, BYUH TV		Western State Colorado	W 105–64	1–0	George Q. Cannon Activities Center; Laie, HI
11/19/2013*; 5:00 pm, Vikings TV		at No. 10 Western Washington	L 74–80	1–1	Carver Gym; Bellingham, WA
11/22/2013*; 3:30 pm, Urban Knights TV		at No. 2 Seattle Pacific; GNAC/Pac West Challenge	L 73–86	1–2	Brougham Pavilion; Seattle, WA
11/23/2013*; 5:30 pm, Wildcats TV		at Central Washington; GNAC/Pac West Challenge	L 93–100 ^{OT}	1–3	Brougham Pavilion; Seattle, WA
11/30/2013; 7:30 pm, BYUH TV		Hawaiʻi-Hilo	W 99–79	2–3 (1–0)	George Q. Cannon Activities Center; Laie, HI
12/07/2013; 3:30 pm, Hawaiʻi-Hilo on Boxcast		at Hawaiʻi-Hilo	W 80–62	3–3 (2–0)	Afook-Chinen Civic Center; Hilo, HI
12/14/2013; 3:30 pm, Sea Warriors TV		at Hawaiʻi Pacific	L 69–79	3–4 (2–1)	Blaisdell Center; Honolulu, HI
12/19/2013*; 7:30 pm, BYUH TV		Lake Superior State	L 73–74 ^{OT}	3–5	George Q. Cannon Activities Center; Laie, HI
12/21/2013; 7:30 pm, BYUH TV		Northwood	W 89–86	4–5	George Q. Cannon Activities Center; Laie, HI
01/06/2014; 7:30 pm, BYUH TV		Academy of Art	W 87–74	5–5 (3–1)	George Q. Cannon Activities Center; Laie, HI
01/08/2014; 7:30 pm, BYUtv		Dominican	W 87–82 ^{OT}	6–5 (4–1)	George Q. Cannon Activities Center; Laie, HI
01/10/2014; 7:30 pm, BYUtv		Point Loma Nazarene	L 69–72	6–6 (4–2)	George Q. Cannon Activities Center; Laie, HI
01/14/2014; 7:30 pm, BYUtv		Chaminade	L 102–105 ^{OT}	6–7 (4–3)	George Q. Cannon Activities Center; Laie, HI
01/18/2014; 5:30 pm, Sunbirds TV		at Fresno Pacific	W 93–86	7–7 (5–3)	Special Events Center; Fresno, CA
01/20/2014; 5:30 pm, Hawks TV		at Holy Names	W 89–77 ^{OT}	8–7 (6–3)	Tobin Gymnasium; Oakland, CA
01/23/2014; 5:30 pm, America One		at Notre Dame de Namur	L 75–79	8–8 (6–4)	Walter Gleasen Gymnasium; Belmont, CA
01/25/2014; 5:30 pm, Urban Knights TV		at Academy of Art	W 112–107 ^{OT}	9–8 (7–4)	Kezar Pavilion; San Francisco, CA
01/30/2014; 7:30 pm, BYUH TV		Azusa Pacific	W 105–82	10–8 (8–4)	George Q. Cannon Activities Center; Laie, HI
02/01/2014; 7:30 pm, BYUH TV		No. 12 Cal Baptist	L 78–84	10–9 (8–5)	George Q. Cannon Activities Center; Laie, HI
02/07/2014; 7:30 pm, BYUtv		Hawaiʻi Pacific	W 99–85	11–9 (9–5)	George Q. Cannon Activities Center; Laie, HI
02/11/2014; 4:30 pm, CEC-TV		at Dixie State	L 94–107 ^{OT}	11–10 (9–6)	Burns Arena; St. George, UT
02/13/2013; 5:30 pm, Cougars TV		at Azusa Pacific	L 69–85	11–11 (9–7)	Felix Events Center; Azusa, CA
02/15/2013; 2:00 pm, America One		at Point Loma Nazarene	W 73–67	12–11 (10–7)	Golden Gymnasium; San Diego, CA
02/22/2014; 7:30 pm, BYUH TV		Fresno Pacific	W 106–71	13–11 (11–7)	George Q. Cannon Activities Center; Laie, HI
02/24/2014; 7:30 pm, BYUtv		Holy Names	W 107–79	14–11 (12–7)	George Q. Cannon Activities Center; Laie, HI
02/27/2014; 7:30 pm		at Chaminade	W 99–98 ^{OT}	15–11 (13–7)	McCabe Gymnasium; Honolulu, HI
2014 Pac West Tournament
03/06/14*; TBA		vs. No. 5-seed Chaminade; 2014 Pac West Quarterfinals			Golden Gymnasium; San Diego, CA
*Non-conference game. ^{#}Rankings from NABC. (#) Tournament seedings in parentheses.
