= Michael Wilbon =

American sportswriter (born 1958)

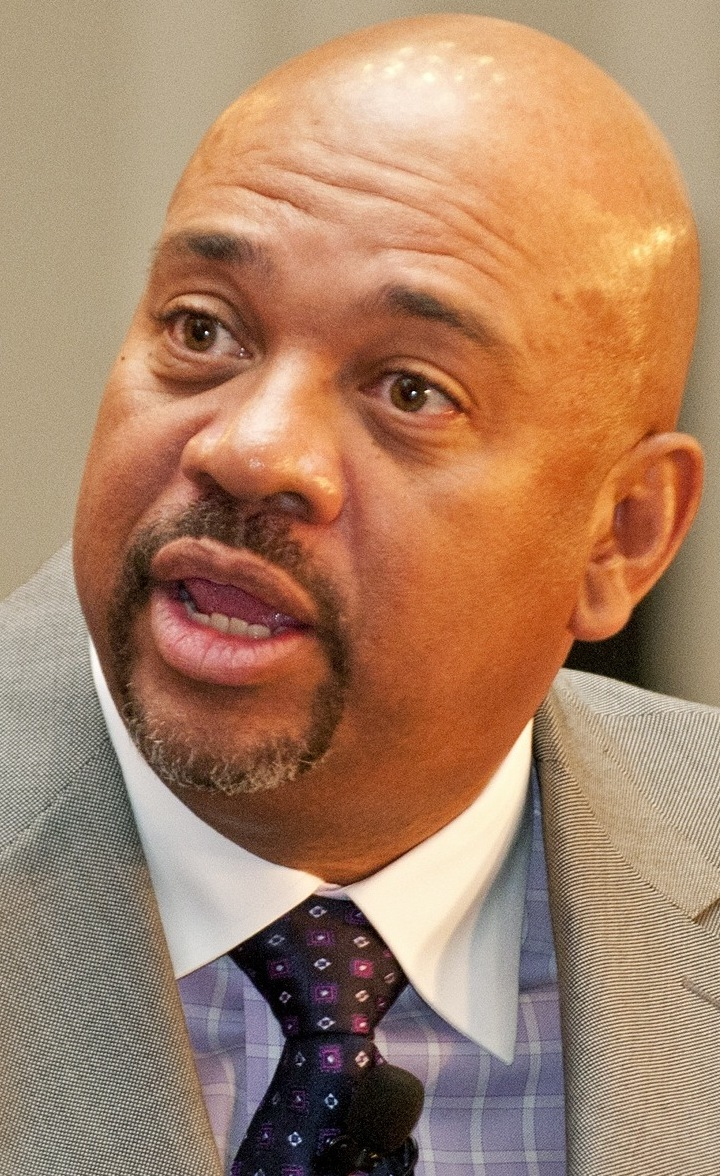
- Wilbon in 2011
- Born: Michael Ray Wilbon; November 19, 1958 (age 68); Chicago, Illinois, U.S.
- Education: Northwestern University (BA)
- Occupations: Sports journalist; TV personality
- Years active: 1979–present
- Employer(s): The Washington Post (1980–2010); ESPN Inc. (2001–present)
- Spouse: Cheryl Johnson (m. 1997)
- Children: 1
- Relatives: Carole Simpson (cousin)

Michael Ray Wilbon (/ˈwɪlbɒn/ WIL-bon; born November 19, 1958) is an American host and commentator for ESPN and former sportswriter and columnist for The Washington Post. He has co-hosted Pardon the Interruption on ESPN since 2001 and is also an analyst.

== Early life and education ==
Wilbon was born and raised in Chicago, Illinois. He graduated from St. Ignatius College Preparatory School in 1976 and received his journalism degree in 1980 from Northwestern University's Medill School of Journalism. While in college, Wilbon wrote for The Daily Northwestern.

== Career ==
=== Newspapers ===
Wilbon served summer internships with The Washington Post in 1979 and 1980 before becoming a full-time sports writer at the newspaper in 1980. He covered college sports, Major League Baseball, the National Football League and the National Basketball Association before being promoted to full-time columnist in 1990. His column in the Post, which dealt as much with the culture of sports as the action on the court or field, appeared up to four times a week until he left to work full-time for ESPN on December 7, 2010.

In his career, Wilbon covered ten Summer and Winter Olympic Games for The Washington Post, every Super Bowl since 1987, nearly every Final Four since 1982 and each year's NBA Finals since 1987. Notably, he was also the only reporter based outside of Hawaii to cover the historic basketball upset of top-ranked Virginia by then-NAIA member Chaminade in 1982 (having been in Honolulu to cover the 1982 Aloha Bowl college football game).

During his time at the Post, Wilbon earned the reputation as one of "the best deadline writer[s] in American newspapers." In 2001, Wilbon was named the top sports columnist by the Society of Professional Journalists.

On December 7, 2010, Wilbon wrote his last column for The Washington Post and officially dedicated full-time to work for ESPN and ABC. Since then he has become more known as an ESPN personality than as a reporter.

=== Television ===
After contributing to ESPN's The Sports Reporters and other shows on the cable network, Wilbon began co-hosting ESPN's daily opinion forum Pardon the Interruption (PTI) with Tony Kornheiser on October 22, 2001. Wilbon was also a member of ABC's NBA Countdown (which he hosted with Jalen Rose, Bill Simmons and Magic Johnson), which was the pre-game show for the network's NBA telecasts. Prior to joining ESPN, Wilbon worked on the BET Budweiser Sports Report show. One memorable segment had Wilbon taking issue with Brian Williams' (later Bison Dele) 1988 transfer from Maryland to Arizona.

In addition to his work at The Washington Post, PTI and ESPN, Wilbon appeared weekly on WRC-TV in Washington, D.C., with WRC Sports Director George Michael, and Pro Football Hall of Famers John Riggins and Sonny Jurgensen on Redskins Report during the football season. He also appeared with Michael, USA Today basketball writer David Dupree and Tony Kornheiser on Full Court Press during the basketball season. Both of these shows were canceled in December 2008 due to budget cuts. Wilbon also forged a close friendship with former Marshall Thundering Herd football and NFL quarterback Byron Leftwich while the young passer was a standout player for HD Woodson high school in Washington, D.C.

In late 2006, Wilbon agreed to a multi-year contract extension with ESPN. After accepting the contract, Wilbon offered to resign from the Post, but the newspaper's chairman Don Graham and executive editor Len Downie both asked him to stay on. The network gained priority therein with regards to conflicts with his newspaper assignments. The first major conflict occurred on February 4, 2007, when Wilbon covered a Detroit Pistons–Cleveland Cavaliers game instead of Super Bowl XLI.

== Personal life ==
Wilbon currently lives in Chicago, and also has a home in Scottsdale, Arizona. Wilbon and his wife Cheryl Johnson Wilbon had their first child, Matthew Raymond Wilbon, via surrogate on March 26, 2008. Kornheiser often refers to Matthew affectionately as "Lilbon."

Wilbon has a cousin, Travon Bellamy, who played for the University of Illinois football team. Former ABC News reporter Carole Simpson is also a cousin.

Wilbon suffered a heart attack on January 27, 2008. After complaining of chest pains, he was taken to a Scottsdale hospital where doctors performed an angioplasty. Wilbon is also a type-2 diabetic.

On August 10, 2008, during a Cubs–Cardinals game at Wrigley Field, Wilbon threw out the ceremonial first pitch and then sang "Take Me Out to the Ballgame" as part of the seventh-inning stretch. Footage of Wilbon wearing a tucked-in Cubs jersey and bouncing the pitch is frequently shown on Pardon The Interruption as a friendly teasing by Kornheiser.

In May 2009, Wilbon competed in a made-for-TV "King of Bowling" show against pro bowling star Wes Malott. Wilbon beat Malott by a score of 256–248, but Wilbon received a 57-pin handicap and Malott had to use a plastic ball.

Wilbon has served as a trustee of Northwestern University.

On November 2, 2026, Wilbon announced that he would be taking an indefinite leave of absence from ESPN, citing multiple health issues.

== Accolades ==
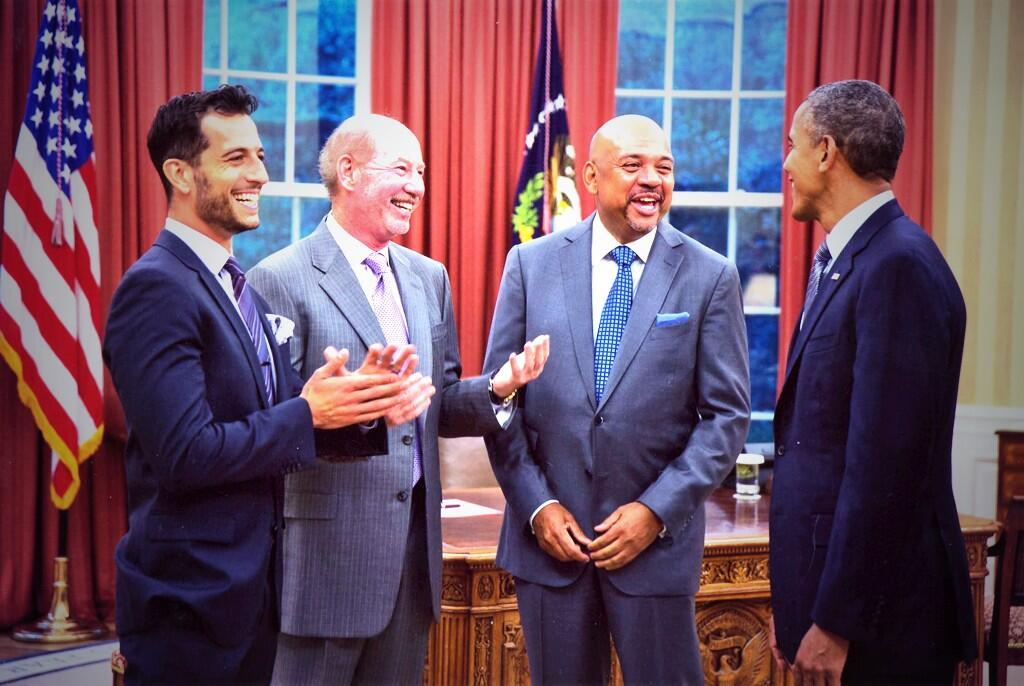
Tony Reali, Tony Kornheiser, and Michael Wilbon meeting President Barack Obama

On July 12, 2013, Wilbon, Kornheiser and Tony Reali (PTI statistician and de facto co-host) were guests at the White House. After lunch the trio met in the Oval Office with President Barack Obama.
