= BYU–Hawaii Seasiders men's basketball =

BYU–Hawaii Seasiders
- University: Brigham Young University–Hawaii
- Conference: Pacific West Conference
- Location: Laie, Hawaii
- Arena: George Q. Cannon Activities Center (capacity: 4,500)
- Nickname: Seasiders
- Colors: Crimson and gold

Uniforms
Home	Away

NCAA tournament runner-up
- 2011
Other NCAA tournament results
Final Four	2011
Elite Eight	2009, 2010, 2011
Sweet Sixteen	2009, 2010, 2011
Appearances	2000, 2002, 2003, 2004, 2005, 2007, 2008, 2009, 2010, 2011, 2015

Conference regular-season champions
- 2000, 2002, 2003, 2004, 2009, 2010

The BYU–Hawaii Seasiders men's basketball team represented Brigham Young University–Hawaii at the NCAA Division II level in college basketball. The team attended 6 NAIA Tournaments and 11 NCAA Division II Tournaments. The Seasiders participated as members of the Pacific West Conference.

== History ==
BYU-Hawaii fielded its first collegiate basketball team in 1978. As members of the NAIA, they were able to develop early rivalries with fellow state schools Chaminade University of Honolulu, Hawaii Pacific University, and University of Hawaii at Hilo. In their 39-year history, the Seasiders won 761 games, 56.5% of the games they played. The Seasiders were also one of the founders of the Pacific West Conference.

While in the NAIA, BYU-Hawaii made the tournament 6 times, Four of those appearances occurred under coach Ken Wagner. In his second season, Wagner led BYU-Hawaii to the 1992 NAIA Final Four. Wagner would lead the Seasiders back to the NAIA Playoffs in 1996, 1997, and 1998 with two second round appearances and a first round appearance.

The Seasiders would transition to NCAA Division II status in the 1998–99 season.

In April 2014, BYU-Hawaii announced that it was phasing out all intercollegiate sports to concentrate on recruiting international students. The 2016-17 season was the Seasiders' last.

=== Coaches ===
Name	Seasons	Record	Win. Pctg.
Dan Smith	1978–79	11–21	34.4
Ted Chidester	1979–87	119–105	62.5
Charles Hess	1987–90	53–46	67.7
Ken Wagner	1990–2016	572–392	68.5
Gabriel Roberts	2016–17	6-20	23

== Individual honors ==
=== National Player of the Year ===
- Lucas Alves (2008–09)

=== Conference Player of the Year ===
- Lucas Alves (2007–08, 2008–09, 2009–10)
- Marques Whippy (2010–11)

=== All-Americans ===
- Chang Tsung-hsien (2010–11)

== Individual records ==
- Marques Whippy (2007–2011) – 245 steals

== See also ==
- 2012–13 BYU–Hawaii Seasiders men's basketball team
- 2013–14 BYU–Hawaii Seasiders men's basketball team
