= 1982 Virginia vs. Chaminade men's basketball game =

American college basketball upset

1982 Virginia vs. Chaminade basketball game
| Virginia Cavaliers | Chaminade Silverswords |
| (8–0) | (10–1) |
|---|---|
| 72 | 77 |
| Head coach: Terry Holland | Head coach: Merv Lopes |
- AP: 1
- Coaches: 1
- AP: NR
- Coaches: NR
| | 1st half | 2nd half | Total |
|---|---|---|---|
| Virginia Cavaliers | 43 | 29 | 72 |
| Chaminade Silverswords | 43 | 34 | 77 |
- Date: December 23, 1982
- Venue: Honolulu International Center, Honolulu, Hawaii
- Referees: Tom Fraim, Giff Johnson, Pat Tanibe
- Attendance: 3,383

United States TV coverage
- Network: None

The 1982 Virginia vs. Chaminade men's basketball game was a college basketball game between the Virginia Cavaliers of the University of Virginia and the Chaminade Silverswords of Chaminade University of Honolulu. The contest was held on December 23, 1982, at the Honolulu International Center in Honolulu, Hawaii. The Silverswords, then a National Association of Intercollegiate Athletics (NAIA) member, defeated the Cavaliers, who were the National Collegiate Athletic Association's (NCAA) top-ranked team, 77–72. Chaminade's victory over a Virginia team that included three-time national player of the year Ralph Sampson was called college basketball's "biggest upset" of all time by multiple publications.

== Background ==
The Cavaliers entered the Chaminade game with an 8–0 win–loss record in the 1982–83 NCAA Division I men's basketball season. The team featured center Ralph Sampson, who had twice been voted national college basketball player of the year; he received similar honors after the 1982–83 season concluded. Along with Sampson, guards Rick Carlisle and Othell Wilson, and forwards Jim Miller, Tim Mullen, and Craig Robinson, were among the Cavaliers' players. The Cavaliers' head coach, Terry Holland, had been in the position since 1974. Earlier in the season, Virginia had won a game on the road against the Duke Blue Devils by a 13-point margin. They had also defeated the Georgetown Hoyas in Landover, Maryland, in what was nicknamed the "Game of the Decade". Afterward, Virginia participated in a tournament in Tokyo and played against the Houston Cougars and Utah Utes, winning both games despite the absence of Sampson, who had been suffering from an intestinal virus. The Cavaliers had hoped to schedule a game against the Hawaii Rainbows, but were unsuccessful. They instead decided to play against the Silverswords. At the time of the contest, Virginia was the number one ranked team in men's college basketball.

Chaminade's basketball program was in its eighth season, and was coming off a record of 28–3 in the 1981–82 season. In the past three seasons, the Silverswords had played the Cavaliers twice, losing both times by double digits. Sampson had compiled 30 points and 16 rebounds against the Silverswords in the teams' 1981 game, which Virginia won 75–59. Chaminade head coach Merv Lopes had been with the team since 1977. Four starters from the Silverswords' 1981–82 team were back for the next season. The key contributors for the Silverswords included guards Tim Dunham, Mark Rodrigues, and Mark Wells, forwards Earnest Pettway and Richard Haenisch, and center Tony Randolph. Eight days before the 1982 Virginia game, Chaminade posted its first-ever victory against Hawaii, by a 56–47 margin. On December 21, the Silverswords lost to Wayland Baptist, Chaminade's only defeat in 11 games. While the Silverswords were not included in the same polls as Virginia, they were fourth in the NAIA rankings entering the game against the Cavaliers, which was the highest placement in school history.

== Game summary ==
The game was held at Honolulu's International Center with 3,383 people in attendance, less than half of the arena's capacity. The opening tip took place at 7:40 Hawaii–Aleutian Standard Time. In the opening minutes of the first half, Chaminade controlled the tempo of the game. According to sportswriter Alexander Wolff, who viewed footage of the game, Chaminade did not attempt to hold possession of the ball for long periods on offense, and often sought to advance quickly up the court after Virginia baskets. Michael Wilbon, a writer for The Washington Post who was in attendance, reported that Chaminade's offense mostly consisted of jump shots away from Virginia's basket. Defensively, the Silverswords focused on guarding their own basket, in an effort to stop Sampson. They attempted to surround Sampson with defenders when he received the basketball; they often used two or three players to guard the Virginia center. Their primary defender against Sampson was Randolph, who gave up 10 inches (25 cm) in height but had familiarity with Sampson, having faced him in high school.

Chaminade's Randolph opened the scoring with a slam dunk after a short-distance miss by Wells. The Silverswords scored six of the game's first eight points, and continued to hold the advantage as the first half progressed. After seven minutes of play they had a 15–10 lead; Randolph had 10 points during this stretch. At one point they led 19–12, before a Cavaliers scoring run that gave Virginia a 22–21 lead. Despite the run, the Cavaliers had difficulty shooting field goals. Mullen later said, "I remember us getting like 10 rebounds per possession and missing layups. The ball would not go in." At the end of the first half, the Cavaliers and the Silverswords were tied, 43–43.

The score remained close early in the second half before Virginia gained the lead. A Ricky Stokes score gave the Cavaliers a seven-point lead with 11:14 remaining. Chaminade responded with a 7–0 scoring run to force a 56–56 tie, before Sampson made a turnaround jump shot to give Virginia the lead back. Immediately after his basket, Silverswords players Dunham and Rodrigues combined on an alley-oop play; Rodrigues passed the basketball to Dunham, who dunked over Sampson. Chaminade forward Richard Haenisch said of the basket, "After that play, I think we all got the feeling we could actually win." With less than six minutes left in the second half, the teams were tied at 62–62. Dunham made a 22-foot jumper to give the Silverswords the lead. The Cavaliers forced another tie at 68–68, only for Wells to make a layup with under two minutes on the game clock. Wells was fouled on the play and earned a three-point play opportunity, but missed his free throw try. Sampson took the rebound for the Cavaliers, who missed two shots from close range during their possession. The Silverswords' Pettway rebounded the second miss and was fouled with 1:15 left. He made two free throws to stretch the Silverswords' lead to four points. Carlisle responded for Virginia with a 15-foot jumper, which cut their deficit in half. Wells converted two free throw attempts after being fouled, before Carlisle scored on another jump shot.

Chaminade held a 74–72 lead with 35 seconds remaining, but Virginia gained possession of the basketball after the Silverswords missed a free throw attempt, which gave the Cavaliers an opportunity to tie the game. However, Virginia was unable to score during the possession; following three missed field goal attempts, Cavaliers player Wilson committed a carrying violation with 10 seconds on the clock. After being fouled by the Cavaliers, Dunham was successful on two free throw attempts, stretching the Silverswords' lead to four points. Wells completed the scoring with another free throw, which made the final score 77–72 in Chaminade's favor.

Chaminade was led by Randolph; in 27 minutes on the court, he recorded 19 points with nine made field goals in 12 attempts, along with 5 rebounds. Dunham added 17 points, while Pettway contributed 13 points and eight rebounds. Nine points and five rebounds were recorded by Haenisch, and Wells had seven points and five assists. For the game, the Silverswords were successful on 28 of their 57 field goal attempts. Virginia made one more basket, but required 14 more shots than Chaminade to do so. For the Cavaliers, Sampson played 38 minutes, scoring 12 points and pulling down 17 rebounds. He had six of Virginia's 25 turnovers in the contest. Carlisle missed 14 of his 21 field goal attempts in the game, while Mullen scored four points.

== Aftermath ==
The result of the game initially was not widely reported in the U.S. media, as it concluded after 3:00 in the morning on the East Coast. The only sportswriter at the contest who was not based in Hawaii was Wilbon, who had been dispatched by the Post to cover the Aloha Bowl, which featured the University of Maryland; he decided to make a side trip to the Virginia–Chaminade game. In addition, the matchup was not televised. As it drew to a close, Chris Berman and Tom Mees were about to conclude a telecast of SportsCenter on ESPN. The anchors received the initial report of the final score from a wire machine, then reacted in disbelief. Shortly afterward, a second bulletin confirming the result was given to them. According to Berman, the viewing audience was then informed: "We can't tell you what happened, but the No. 1 team in college basketball has lost to—we don't even know who they are."

Sports Illustrated and the Los Angeles Times later identified the game as the greatest upset in the history of college basketball. Author Chuck Klosterman went further, calling the Silverswords' win "the biggest upset in collegiate sports history". Chaminade gained increased prominence after the game, which caused the school to cancel a plan to change its name to the University of Honolulu. The Silverswords won their next nine games and reached number one in the NAIA rankings. They finished the 1982–83 season with a record of 34–5, reaching the semifinals of the 1983 NAIA men's basketball tournament before being eliminated by the College of Charleston.

The loss knocked Virginia out of the number one spot in the Associated Press (AP) Poll. The Cavaliers ended the season at 29–5, winning 11 of 12 games after playing Chaminade, and received a number one seed in the 1983 NCAA Division I men's basketball tournament. The Cavaliers, who were placed in the West region, advanced to the regional final. They fell short of the Final Four, as they lost to number six seed North Carolina State, who had already defeated Virginia in the championship game of the ACC Basketball Tournament and eventually won the national championship. Virginia did not regain the number one ranking in the AP Poll until the 2017–18 Cavaliers reached the position on February 12, 2018. That season's team was ranked first entering the 2018 NCAA Tournament, but became the first NCAA Tournament one-seed to lose against a 16-seed in a 74–54 defeat by UMBC.

The Silverswords won further games against Division I teams in future seasons. Chaminade followed up the win over the Cavaliers by beating Louisville in both 1983 and 1984, by scores of 83–72 and 67–65, showing that the Virginia game was not a one-game fluke for Chaminade. The second Louisville win was against a Cardinals team ranked 12th in a national poll. Three days after that game, the Silverswords defeated SMU, the third-ranked team in the country, on a buzzer-beating shot. Chaminade's victory led to the creation of the Maui Invitational Tournament, an annual event in which the Silverswords compete with seven major college teams. As of 2017, Chaminade has won eight games in the Maui Invitational since its creation in 1984; its most recent win was in 2017 versus the California Golden Bears.

== Bibliography ==
- Danilewicz, Jack (2019). The Greatest Upset Never Seen: Virginia, Chaminade, and the Game That Changed Basketball Forever. Lincoln, Nebraska: University of Nebraska Press. ISBN 978-1-4962-0848-4.
