= Susie Wind =

Susie Wind (born 1968 in Wichita, Kansas) is a visual artist specializing in oils and chalk paintings. She is active in the Seattle arts community but has participated in showings across the United States.

Wind received a bachelor's degree in Fine Arts from the University of Utah in 1995 and a master's degree in Art Therapy from College of Notre Dame in Belmont, California in 1997. She is married to Professional Engineer Lloyd Wind. They had two children.

Wind specializes in "Urban Settings", a subset of American Scene Painting, a generalized series of vignettes attempting to capture the unknown stories of previous inhabitants of the spaces we now inhabit. She has been featured in showings at Salt Lake City Library and several other civic and municipal settings, as well as many gallery shows.

== Solo shows ==
- June 2017 "Inner Dialogue" Fountainhead Gallery, Seattle WA
- January 2016 "Snapshots of Appreciation" Fountainhead Gallery
- 2013 Fountainhead Gallery
- 2010 Fountainhead Gallery
- 2008 Fountainhead Gallery
- 2007 Fountainhead Gallery
- 2007 Mountlake Terrace Library, Mountlake Terrace WA
- 2006 Virginia Inn, Seattle WA
- 2006 Lynnwood Library, Lynnwood WA
- 2006 Old Redmond Schoolhouse, Redmond WA
- 2006 Wade James Theatre, Edmonds WA
- 2005 Harbor Steps, Seattle WA
- 2005 Click Wine Gallery, Seattle WA
- 2005 Shoreline Arts Council Gallery, Shoreline WA
- 2004 Blue Door Gallery, Seattle WA
- 2004 Kent City Arts Gallery, Kent WA
- 2003 Gallery North, Edmonds WA
- 2003 Blue Door Gallery, Seattle WA
- 2003 Site 17, Seattle WA
- 2003 Ida Culver House, Seattle WA
- 2002 Virginia Inn, Seattle WA
- 2002 Gilmartin Gallery U.U.C., Seattle WA
- 2001 Genesis Salon, Seattle WA
- 1999 Sun Light Cafe, Seattle WA
- 1999 Still Life Coffeehouse, Seattle WA
- 1997 Torrefazzione, Palo Alto CA
- 1996 Atrium Gallery, Salt Lake City UT
- 1995 Galleria Meditarreano, Salt Lake City UT

== Group exhibitions ==
- 2006 38th Annual International Juried, Palm Springs CA
- 2006 Fountainhead Gallery, Seattle WA
- 2006 Greenwood Artwalk, Seattle WA
- 2004 Kaewyn Gallery, Bothell WA
- 2004 Northwest Annual Juried, Seattle WA
- 2004 Greenwood Artwalk, Seattle WA
- 2003 Eastshore Gallery, Bellevue WA
- 2003 Greenwood Artwalk, Seattle WA
- 2003 Ocean Shores National Juried, Ocean Shores WA
- 2003 National Women's Juried, Boise ID
- 2002 Northwest Artists Annual, Edmonds WA
- 2002 Northwest Annual Juried, Seattle WA
- 2002 Gallery North, Edmonds WA
- 2002 Greenwood Artwalk, Seattle WA
- 2001 F.A.C.E. Edmonds City Hall, Edmonds WA
- 2001 Greenwood Artwalk, Seattle WA
- 2000 Howard Mandeville Gallery, Edmonds WA
- 1999 F.A.C.E Gallery, Lynnwood WA
- 1997 Graduating Master's Exhibit, Belmont CA
- 1997 Annual California Art Therapy Exhibit, Belmont CA
- 1994 Salt Lake City Arts Counctil Annual Exhibit, Salt Lake City UT

== Awards ==
- 2004 Second Place, Northwest Annual Juried Competition, Seattle WA
- 2004 People's Choice, Greenwood Artwalk, Seattle WA
- 2003 First Place (Painting), Ocean Shores Annual National, Ocean Shores WA
- 2002 First Place, Regional Painting Competition, Bothell WA
