= Travon Bellamy =

American football player (born 1988)

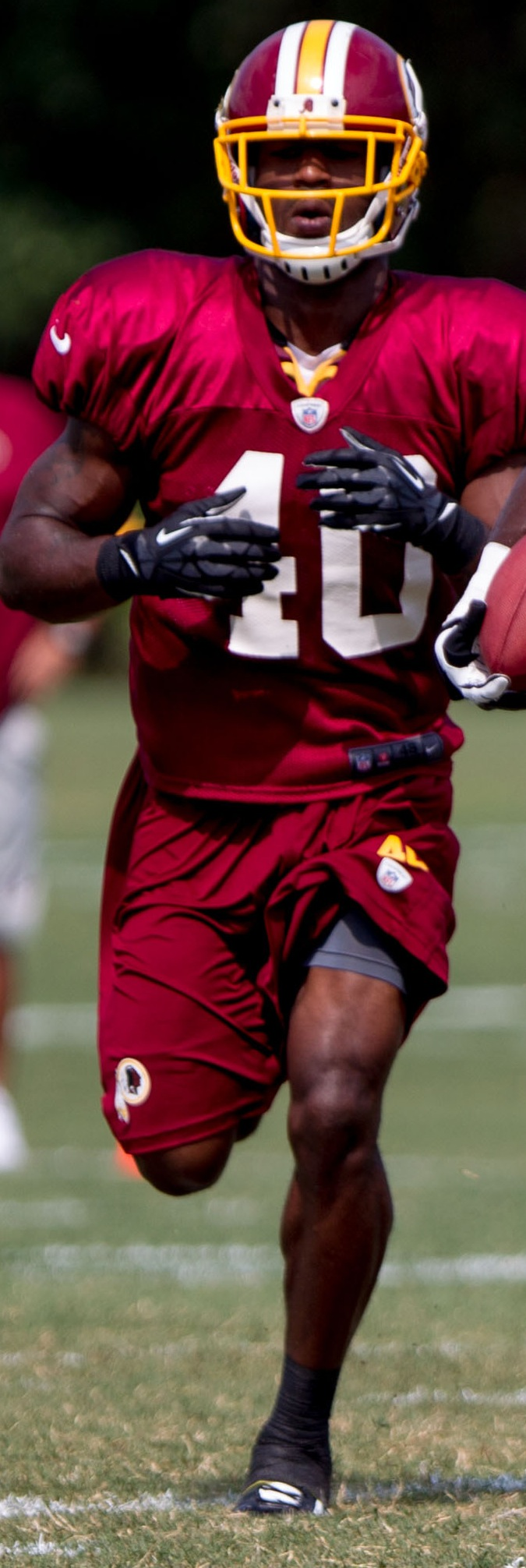
- Bellamy at Redskins training camp in 2012

No. 35, 40
- Position: Cornerback

Personal information
- Born: January 11, 1988 (age 38); Washington, D.C.
- Listed height: 5 ft 11 in (1.80 m)
- Listed weight: 205 lb (93 kg)

Career information
- College: Illinois
- NFL draft: 2011: undrafted

Career history
- St. Louis Rams (2011)*; Chicago Rush (2011)*; Washington Redskins (2011–2012)*
- * Offseason or practice squad member only
- Stats at Pro Football Reference

Travon Garrett Bellamy (born January 11, 1988) is an American former football cornerback. He was signed by the St. Louis Rams as an undrafted free agent in 2011. He played college football for the University of Illinois.

He was also a member of the Chicago Rush and Washington Redskins.

== Early life ==
Bellamy attended Eleanor Roosevelt High School in Greenbelt, Maryland, where he played football. He graduated from Eleanor Roosevelt in 2006.

== College career ==
Bellamy attended the University of Illinois. He played cornerback for the Illinois from 2006 to 2010. In his senior year, Bellamy started 12 of 13 games. During the 2010 season, he recorded 70 tackles, third-most on the team, and six pass breakups.

== Professional career ==
Pre-draft measurables
Height	Weight	40-yard dash	10-yard split	20-yard split	20-yard shuttle	Three-cone drill	Vertical jump	Broad jump	Bench press
5 ft 11 1/8 in (1.81 m)	196 lb (89 kg)	4.53 s	1.51 s	2.65 s	4.08 s	6.80 s	35.5 in (0.90 m)	9 ft 5 in (2.87 m)	18 reps
All values from Pro Day

=== St. Louis Rams ===
On July 30, 2011, Bellamy signed with the St. Louis Rams as an undrafted free agent. The Rams waived Bellamy on August 3, 2011.

=== Chicago Rush ===
Bellamy was assigned to the Chicago Rush on October 5, 2011. He was exempted by the Rush on December 1, 2011.

=== Washington Redskins ===
On November 29, 2011, Bellamy was signed to the practice squad of the Washington Redskins.

On January 3, 2012, Bellamy signed a futures contract with the Redskins. He was released on August 31, 2012 for final cuts before the start of the 2012 season.

== Personal ==
Bellamy is a cousin of ESPN PTI personality and longtime Washington Post sports columnist, Michael Wilbon.
