= Dominican Penguins =

Athletics team for Dominican University of California

- University: Dominican University of California
- Conference: PacWest (primary); RMAC (men's lacrosse); MEC (women's lacrosse)
- NCAA: Division II
- Athletic director: Amy Henkelman
- Location: San Rafael, California
- Varsity teams: 15 (6 men's, 9 women's)
- Basketball arena: Conlan Center
- Mascot: Chilly the Penguin
- Nickname: Penguins
- Colors: Black, ice, and gold
- Website: dominicanathletics.com

The Dominican Penguins are the athletics teams that represent Dominican University of California, located in San Rafael, California, in intercollegiate sports as a member of the Division II level of the National Collegiate Athletic Association (NCAA), primarily competing in the Pacific West Conference as a provisional member for most of their sports since the 2009–10 academic year (achieving D-II full member status in 2011–12); while its men's lacrosse team competes in the Western Collegiate Lacrosse League (WCLL) at the Division I level of the Men's Collegiate Lacrosse Association (MCLA). The Penguins previously competed in the California Pacific Conference (Cal Pac) of the National Association of Intercollegiate Athletics (NAIA) from 1996–97 to 2008–09.

== Varsity teams ==
Dominican competes in 15 intercollegiate varsity sports: Men's sports include basketball, cross country, golf, lacrosse, soccer and track & field; while women's sports include basketball, cross country, golf, lacrosse, soccer, softball, tennis, track & field and volleyball.

== Facilities ==
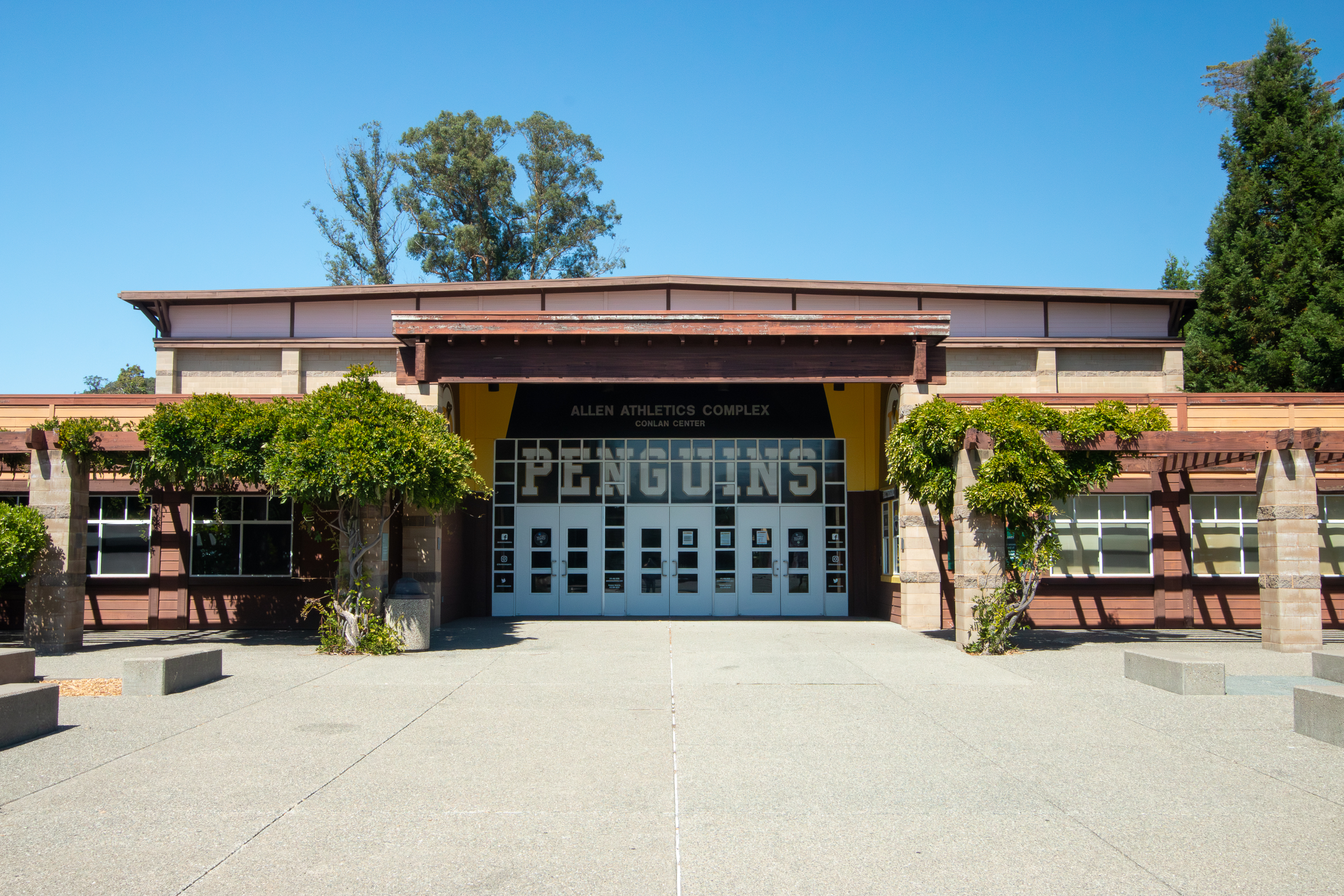
Conlan Center

The Conlan Center opened in 2000 and is home to the Dominican Volleyball and Basketball teams. It also features a swimming pool, weight room, office, and other athletics facilities. The John F. Allen Athletics Complex opened in 2012 and boasts Kennelly Field and the Castellucci Family Tennis Center. In 2015, the construction of Penguin Field provided an on-campus home to the Softball team for the first time and completed the John F. Allen Athletics Complex.

== History ==
In 2008 Dominican began a transition to NCAA Division II membership and in 2009 joined the Pacific West Conference. The move put the Penguins in the same conference as fellow Bay Area rivals Notre Dame de Namur University and the Academy of Art University.

Dominican men's golf became the first team to reach a regional with the 2015 NCAA Division II Men's Golf Championships. The Penguins finished in eighth place out of 20 teams and missed the national tournament by six strokes.

Dominican's student-athletes won the PacWest's "Community Engagement Award" for their community service initiatives in 2009. Dominican earned the PacWest Academic Achievement Award for six consecutive seasons (2009–2015) for achieving the highest overall student-athlete GPA of all schools in the Pacific West Conference.

Prior to becoming a member of the NCAA, Dominican was a member of NAIA Division II. The Penguins won four consecutive California Pacific Conference men's basketball championships from 2003 to 2006, then again in 2008. Men's basketball also reached the NAIA Championships four consecutive years from 2003 to 2006 and advanced to the Sweet 16 in 2005. Women's basketball reached the Sweet 16 in 2004 and also qualified for the tournament the following season. Women's basketball was the National Small College Runner-up in 1995–96.

== Mascot ==
Chilly the Mascot is the Penguins' mascot and has seen several costumed iterations, from inflatable to sporting a top hat to his current "buff" state. The Dominican mascot has been the Penguins since the student body voted to change the school's nickname to honor the Dominican Sisters in the mid-1970s. Chilly was named the Mascot of the Month in May 2015 by mascots.com.

== Men's lacrosse ==
Dominican also sponsors Men's Lacrosse, which plays in the Men's Collegiate Lacrosse Association Division I. Previously, the Penguins participated in the NCAA Division II and were a founding member of the Western Intercollegiate Lacrosse Association, the first association west of the Mississippi River. Dominican won the WILA in 2013 and 2014 before transitioning to the MCLA for the 2015 season.
