= Holy Names Hawks =

- University: Holy Names University
- Conference: PacWest
- NCAA: Division II
- Athletic director: Phillip Billeci-Gard
- Location: Oakland, California
- Varsity teams: 13
- Basketball arena: Tobin Gymnasium
- Baseball stadium: College of Alameda
- Mascot: Mohawk
- Nickname: Hawks
- Colors: Red and white
- Website: www.hnuhawks.com

The Holy Names Hawks (also HNU Hawks) were the athletic teams that represented Holy Names University, located in Oakland, California, in intercollegiate sports as a member of the NCAA Division II ranks, which primarily competed in the Pacific West Conference (PacWest) from 2012–13 until 2022–23. The Hawks previously competed in the California Pacific Conference (Cal Pac) of the National Association of Intercollegiate Athletics (NAIA) from 1996–97 to 2011–12.

HNU Athletics completed the NCAA membership process in July 2016 and was a member of NCAA Division II until 2023.

== History ==
In 1994 Holy Names University, then Holy Names College, elevated its club sports to intercollegiate athletics by joining the National Association of Intercollegiate Athletics (NAIA). HNU began its NAIA affiliation in the fall of 1994 as part of the Pacific Coastal Conference, competing in basketball, volleyball, and cross-country.

During 1995, Holy Names University competed as an independent before becoming a founding member of the California Pacific Conference (CAL PAC) in 1996. As a member of the CAL PAC, HNU Athletics earned: 7 California Pacific Conference All-Sports Awards, 54 conference championships, 36 NAIA national tournament appearances, 26 regional tournament appearances, 3 regional championships, 25 conference MVPs, 35 NAIA All-Americans, 69 Academic All-Americans, and 26 conference coach of the year awards.

In May 2011, HNU Athletics was accepted for membership (transitional) in the Pacific West Conference, effective fall 2012, and in June 2012, HNU Athletics was accepted for candidacy membership in Division II of the National Collegiate Athletic Association (NCAA). The university is in the third year of the membership process.

In July 2016, HNU Athletics became an active member in the NCAA DII PacWest Conference.

In November 2016, the Men's Cross Country team became the first team in the school's history to compete in a post-season event as an active NCAA D-II member.

== Varsity teams ==
HNU competed in 13 intercollegiate varsity sports: Men's sports included baseball, basketball, cross country, golf, soccer and tennis; while women's sports included basketball, cross country, golf, soccer, softball, tennis and volleyball. Men's volleyball is offered as a club sport. Former sports included men's & women's track & field.
