= Point Loma Sea Lions =

- University: Point Loma Nazarene University
- Nickname: Sea Lions
- NCAA: Division II
- Conference: PacWest
- Athletic director: Jordan Courneya
- Location: San Diego, California
- Varsity teams: 11 (4 men's, 7 women's)
- Basketball arena: Golden Gymnasium
- Baseball stadium: Carroll B. Land Stadium
- Colors: Forest green and sunset gold
- Website: plnusealions.com
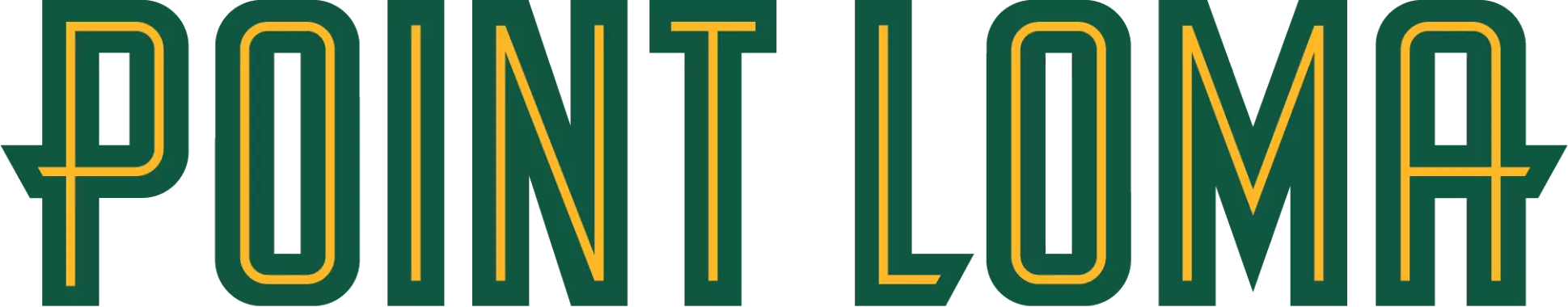

The Point Loma Sea Lions (also referred to as the Point Loma Nazarene Sea Lions or the PLNU Sea Lions) are the intercollegiate athletic teams that represent Point Loma Nazarene University. The Sea Lions compete in NCAA Division II as a member of the Pacific West Conference (PacWest).

== History ==
The Sea Lions were a member of the National Christian College Athletic Association (NCCAA), primarily competing as an independent in the West Region of the Division I level. The Sea Lions previously competed in the Golden State Athletic Conference (GSAC) of the National Association of Intercollegiate Athletics (NAIA) from 1986–87 to 2011–12.

In 2002, the mascot was changed from the Crusaders to the Sea Lions. In 2013, Point Loma Athletics also dropped the usage of its 'mythical beast of the sea' logo and its Vegas Gold Color. The Sea Lions added Sunset Gold to their color scheme and also updated their logo, with the help of Joe Bosack Co., to create the current PLNU Athletic Word Mark and Crest.

Point Loma became an active member in the NCAA since the summer of 2014, which signified the conclusion of their three-year transition process from the NAIA to NCAA Division II.

PLNU has won the National Scholastic Surfing Association college national championship six times, in 1989, 1999, and 2015-2018. Women's golf was added to replace the softball program that was dropped in 2010 due to the lack of a suitable and permanent playing field.

== Varsity teams ==
Point Loma competes in 11 intercollegiate varsity sports: Men's sports include baseball, basketball, soccer and tennis; while women's sports include basketball, cross country, golf, soccer, tennis, track & field and volleyball.

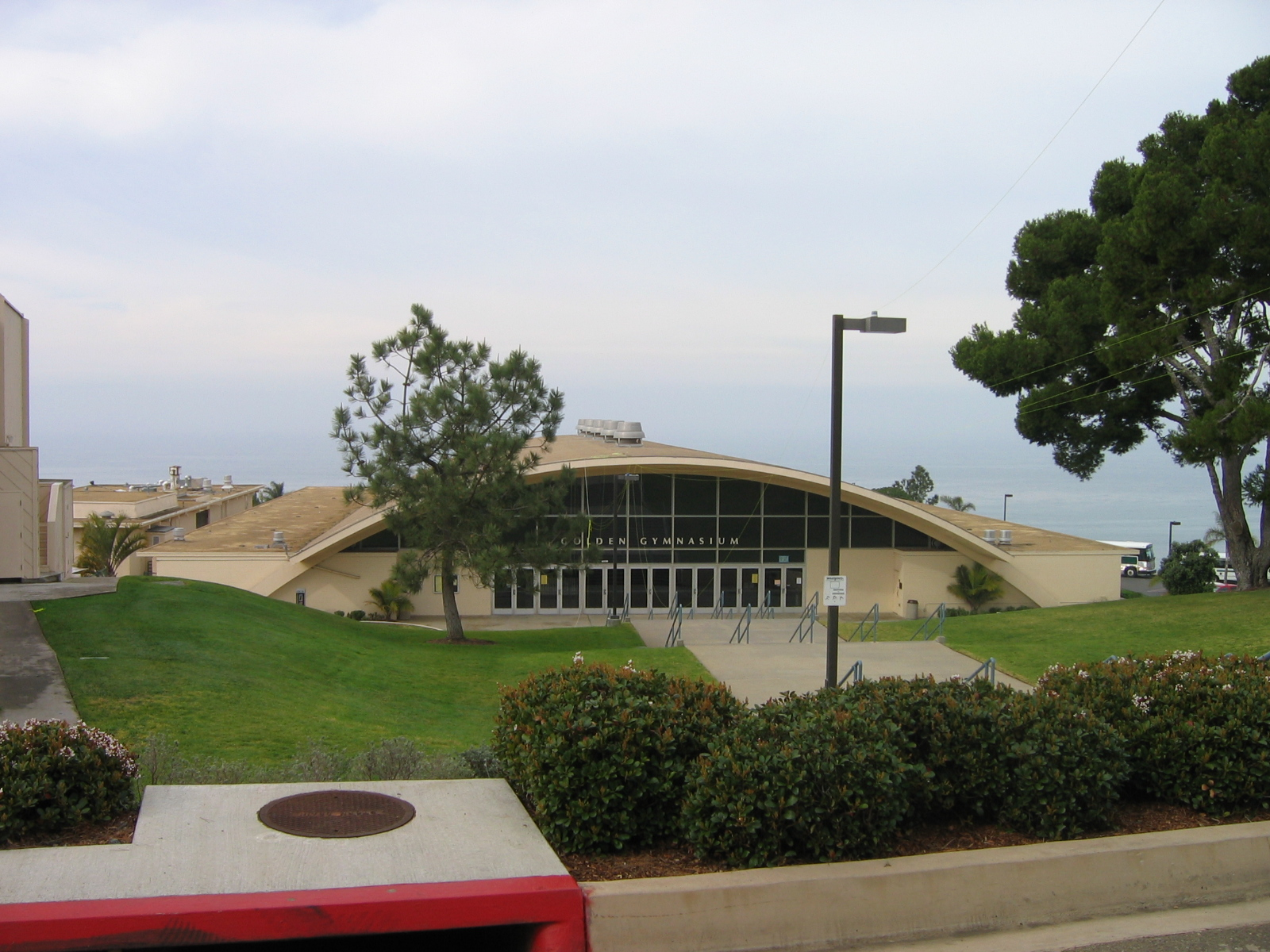
PLNU's Golden Gym

Men's sports	Women's sports
Baseball	Basketball
Basketball	Cross country
Soccer	Golf
Tennis	Soccer
	Tennis
	Track & field
	Volleyball

== National championships ==
=== Team ===
Sport	Association	Division	Year	Opponent/Runner-up	Score
Women's soccer (1)	NCAA	Division II	2023	Washburn	1–0
