= Academy of Art Urban Knights =

University sports teams in California, US

- University: Academy of Art University
- Conference: PacWest
- NCAA: Division II
- Athletic director: Brad Jones
- Location: San Francisco, California
- First season: 2012 (closed in 2025)
- Varsity teams: 13 (5 men's, 8 women's)
- Basketball arena: Kezar Pavilion
- Softball stadium: Mission Blue Field
- Soccer field: Paul Goode Field; CCSF Field
- Tennis venue: Bay Club Tennis San Francisco
- Nickname: Urban Knights
- Colors: Red and black
- Website: artuathletics.com
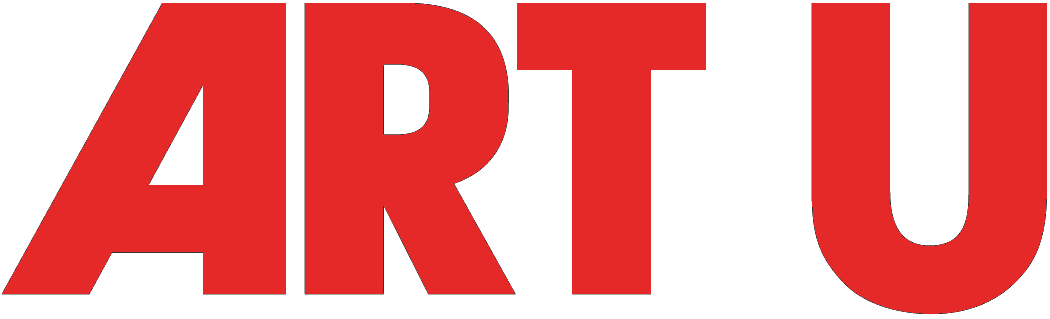

Team NCAA championships
- 2

Individual and relay NCAA champions
- 29

The Academy of Art Urban Knights were the 13 varsity athletic teams that represented Academy of Art University, located in San Francisco, California, in NCAA Division II intercollegiate sports. The Urban Knights compete as members of the Pacific West Conference.

The Academy discontinued its athletics program in April 2025.

== History ==
The university's athletic department was established in 2006 with the hiring of Jamie Williams as Athletic Director. In July 2009, Academy of Art began the three-year transition process to become a member of the NCAA. At that time, they joined the Pacific West Conference in Division II. This process was completed successfully with the Urban Knights being granted full membership privileges by the NCAA in July 2012.

In the 2014–2015 season, the men's cross country team had a second-place finish and the women's team had a record fourth-place finish, earned at the Pacific West Conference Championships. Valentin Pepiot, their third NCAA Nationals individual qualifier, was one of the top finishers from the PacWest in the postseason finale. Academy of Art earned a record 10 PacWest postseason honors.

For the 2015 indoor and outdoor track and field seasons, they had seven All-American honors and one NCAA individual champion in Jordan Edwards.

The men's basketball team earned their first victory against a Division I team on November 28, 2021 when they beat the UC Davis Aggies 79–60.

In April 2024, the Academy announced its athletics program would be discontinued at the conclusion of the 2024–25 academic year.

== Varsity sports ==
The Urban Knights also fielded a baseball program from 2009 to 2023.

Men's sports	Women's sports
Basketball	Basketball
Cross country	Cross country
Golf	Golf
Soccer	Soccer
Track & field	Softball
	Tennis
	Track and field
	Volleyball

== Notable people ==
A number of Academy of Art's athletes and staff have participated in professional sports and in the Olympic Games. They include:

- Brandon Poulson – played 2 seasons after being signed by the Minnesota Twins in 2010
- Mobolade Ajomale – 2016 Olympic bronze medalist in the 4 × 100 m relay
- Lindsey Yamasaki – school's first women's basketball coach played 2 seasons in the WNBA
- Jamie Williams – school's first athletic director played 12 seasons as a tight end in the NFL

== National championships ==
Association	Division	Sport	Team / Individual	Year
NCAA	Division II	Women's outdoor track & field	Team	2013
NCAA	Division II	Women's indoor track & field	Team	2013
NCAA	Division II	Men's long jump & triple jump	Johnny Carter	2013
NCAA	Division II	400m Outdoors	Jordan Edwards	2014
NCAA	Division II	400m Outdoors	Jordan Edwards	2015
NCAA	Division II	400m Indoors	Jordan Edwards	2016
NCAA	Division II	Women's golf	Anahi Servin	2022
