= Chaminade Silverswords =

Intercollegiate sports teams of Chaminade University of Honolulu

- University: Chaminade University of Honolulu
- Conference: PacWest
- NCAA: Division II
- Athletic director: Dr. Tom Buning
- Location: Honolulu, Hawaii
- Varsity teams: 12 (5 men's, 7 women's)
- Basketball arena: McCabe Gym
- Softball stadium: Central Oahu Regional Park
- Soccer stadium: Saint Louis Field
- Nickname: Silverswords
- Colors: Royal blue and white
- Website: goswords.com
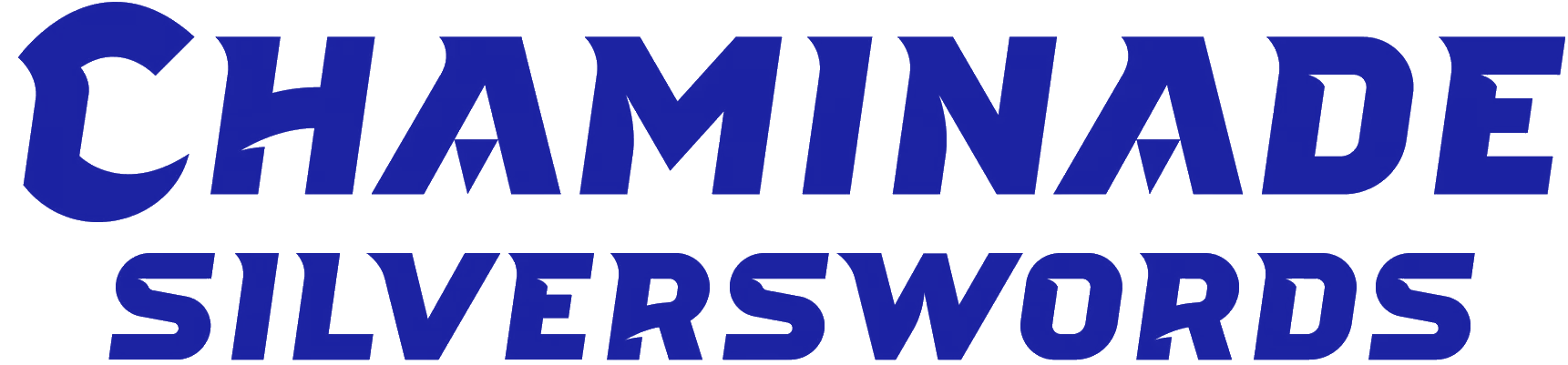

The Chaminade Silverswords are the 12 varsity athletic teams that represent Chaminade University of Honolulu, located in Honolulu, Hawaii, in NCAA Division II intercollegiate sports. The Silverswords compete as members of the Pacific West Conference in all sponsored sports except beach volleyball, in which they are independent. Chaminade University of Honolulu's team name is the "Silverswords," a reference to a Hawaiian plant prized for its beauty and ability to withstand harsh conditions.

== History ==
In 1982, Chaminade, then a member of the NAIA, defeated Virginia in what was considered the biggest upset in college basketball history up to that point. Virginia, which featured Ralph Sampson and Rick Carlisle, was the top-ranked team in NCAA Division I basketball entering the game after posting victories against Georgetown (with Patrick Ewing) and Phi Slama Jama of Houston.

But in the Blaisdell Arena, the 3,500 fans in attendance, most of whom had come to see the nation's No. 1 team, witnessed the historic 77–72 upset. Many newspapers reportedly checked sources several times to make sure the story was right—that 800-student NAIA Chaminade had actually defeated the NCAA's top-ranked Cavaliers.

The Maui Invitational, hosted by Chaminade, began in 1984, partly due to the Silverswords' 1982 win over Virginia.

== Varsity sports ==
The most recently added sports are baseball and beach volleyball, both added in 2023–24. Baseball had originally been sponsored in 1979–80, but dropped to club level after that season and disbanded completely after the 1981 season. Beach volleyball had been a club-level sport (billed as an "exhibition team") since the 2013 spring season.

Men's sports	Women's sports
Baseball	Basketball
Basketball	Beach volleyball
Cross country	Cross country
Golf	Soccer
Soccer	Softball
	Tennis
	Volleyball

== Maui Invitational ==
Chaminade hosts a major annual early-season tournament in NCAA Division I men's basketball: the Maui Invitational. The Silverswords are the only Division II team that plays in the Maui Invitational. However, since 2018, the Silverswords only appear in the tournament in odd-numbered years. In even-numbered years, Chaminade plays two games at tournament participants' home arenas.

In the 2012 invitational, Chaminade defeated the Texas Longhorns in the opening round by a score of 86–73. It was the second career loss to Chaminade for Texas coach Rick Barnes, who previously lost in 1991 as the coach of the Providence Friars. As of 2017, the Silverswords' record in the tournament is 8–92 after a 24-point win over California.

== Notable staff ==
- Al Walker (born 1959), former basketball player and college coach, now a scout for the Detroit Pistons of the NBA
