= Notre Dame de Namur University =

Catholic university in Belmont, California, US

- Former name: College of Notre Dame
- Motto: Ora et Labora (Latin)
- Motto in English: Pray and Work
- Type: Private university
- Established: 1851; 175 years ago
- Founder: Sisters of Notre Dame de Namur
- Religious affiliation: Roman Catholic (Notre Dame Sisters)
- Academic affiliations: ACCU, AICCU
- President: Lizbeth Martin
- Faculty: 122 FTE
- Students: 200 (2023)
- Undergraduates: 12 (2023)
- Postgraduates: 188 (2023)
- Location: Belmont, California, United States; 37°31′02″N 122°17′04″W
- Campus: Suburban (46 acres or 19 ha)
- Colors: Blue, Gold, White
- Website: www.ndnu.edu

Notre Dame de Namur University (NDNU) is a private Catholic university in Belmont, California, United States. It is the third oldest college in California and the first college in the state authorized to grant the baccalaureate degree to women.

In 2021, the university began to transition to only operate as a graduate school. In 2024, the university was in the process of moving to a hybrid online model with its physical campus being sold to Stanford University, but Stanford backed out of purchasing the campus in May 2025. A few days later, it was announced that the campus had been purchased by the investment arm of the University of California.

== History ==
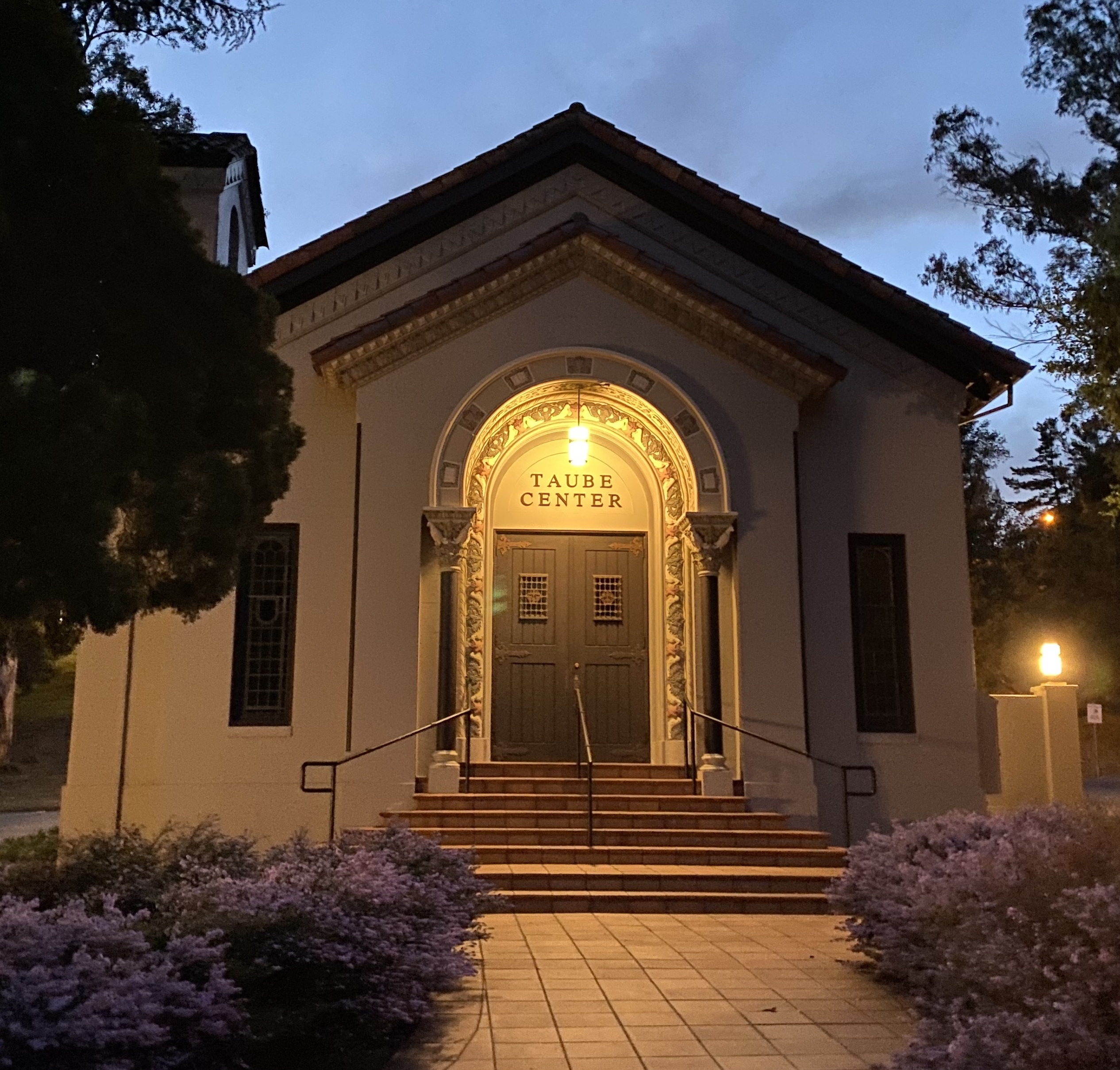
The historic Spanish Colonial Revival-style Taube Center.

Notre Dame de Namur University was founded by the Sisters of Notre Dame de Namur as the Academy of Notre Dame in 1851 on 10 acres in San Jose, California. The school was chartered in 1868 as the College of Notre Dame, the first college in the state of California authorized to grant the baccalaureate degree to women. In 1922, the Sisters purchased Ralston Hall, the country estate of William Chapman Ralston, founder of the Bank of California. The college opened its doors in Belmont in 1923.

In 1953 the College of Notre Dame became a four-year college with 23 Sisters of Notre Dame de Namur involved in the school. The college introduced evening classes in 1955, and in 1965, started the teaching credential programs. Originally a women's institution, College of Notre Dame became coeducational in 1969; three men graduated as part of the class of 1970. The college expanded its offerings to include master's degrees in 1972 and added evening undergraduate programs in 1987.

In 2001, the college established a structure dividing the university into schools and changed its name to Notre Dame de Namur University. In 2009, the university began offering partnerships with local community colleges to provide greater access to higher education, and that same year it became a Hispanic-Serving Institution, meaning at least 25% of its undergraduate population is Hispanic, that same year. The online degree program was established in 2012, and in 2013, the university introduced one of the first PhD programs in art therapy in the nation. The university established a new campus in Tracy, California in 2015, offering evening undergraduate and graduate degree programs in business administration.

Notre Dame de Namur University was one of the first universities in the United States to offer a Ph.D. in Art Therapy. The Art Therapy Ph.D., launched in 2013, is also the first doctoral program offered at the university.

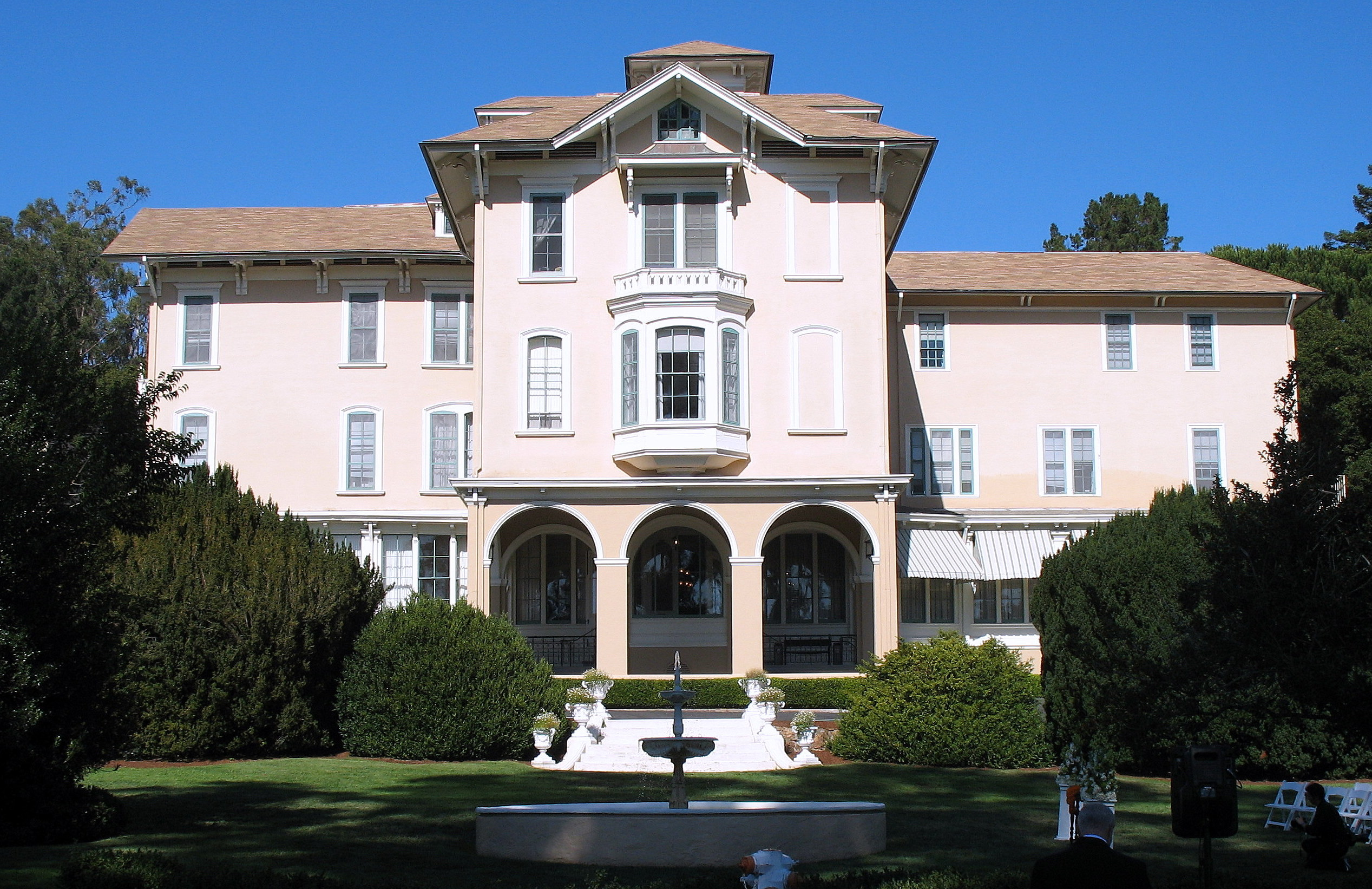
Ralston Hall, built in 1864, was the country estate of William Ralston, founder of the Bank of California.

In 2016 the faculty, both full-time and adjunct, unionized with SEIU 1021. This was a historic move since tenure-line professors at Catholic universities have had trouble unionizing since the Yeshiva ruling (1980).

In December 2017, BINA48 (a Hanson Robotics robot) successfully participated as a guest student in a full semester college course on philosophy and love created and taught by Professor William J. Barry at Notre Dame de Namur University. The robot used an algorithm framework called TQ Theory created by Professor Barry to interact with rapport with students.

In March 2020, the university announced major changes as a result of on-going financial issues, declining enrollment, and effects of the COVID-19 pandemic. The board of trustees made the decision to prioritize current students completing degrees by the end of the 2020–21 academic year while assisting other students in transfer options due to uncertainty of operations beyond the spring 2021 semester. As part of the plan, Notre Dame suspended new student admissions for summer and fall 2020 sessions. This resulted in mass layoffs and the closure of some of their most successful departments including all their undergraduate programs. The university also disbanded the athletics department at the conclusion of the 2019–20 academic year.

In 2021, the university began to transition to only operate as a graduate school. It also established an agreement with Stanford University allowing that university to purchase the Notre Dame de Namur University campus.

In 2022, Notre Dame de Namur University became the first West Coast university to provide temporary housing for Afghan refugees.

In 2022, the university's accreditor, the WASC Senior College and University Commission, formally warned the university that it was not in compliance with the commission's accreditation standards. The warning status was removed in 2024 following a special visit but a "notice of concern" was issued due to the university's ongoing financial challenges. Stanford backed out of purchasing the campus in 2025.

== Campus ==
Notre Dame de Namur University is located in Belmont, California on the San Francisco Bay Area Peninsula and near the Pacific Ocean. The campus is approximately equidistant between the two largest cities in Northern California, being less than 30 miles from downtown San Francisco and downtown San Jose.

=== Academic buildings ===
Cuvilly Hall, named for Sr. Julie Billiart's birthplace, is one of the main instructional buildings and houses the School of Business and Management. St. Mary's Hall is the largest instructional building and includes classrooms; science labs; two computer labs; public safety; and the financial aid, registrar, and business offices. Gavin Hall is the smallest of the three main instructional buildings and houses the Art Therapy program.

The theater of Notre Dame de Namur University is located below the main campus on Ralston Avenue.

=== Ralston Hall ===
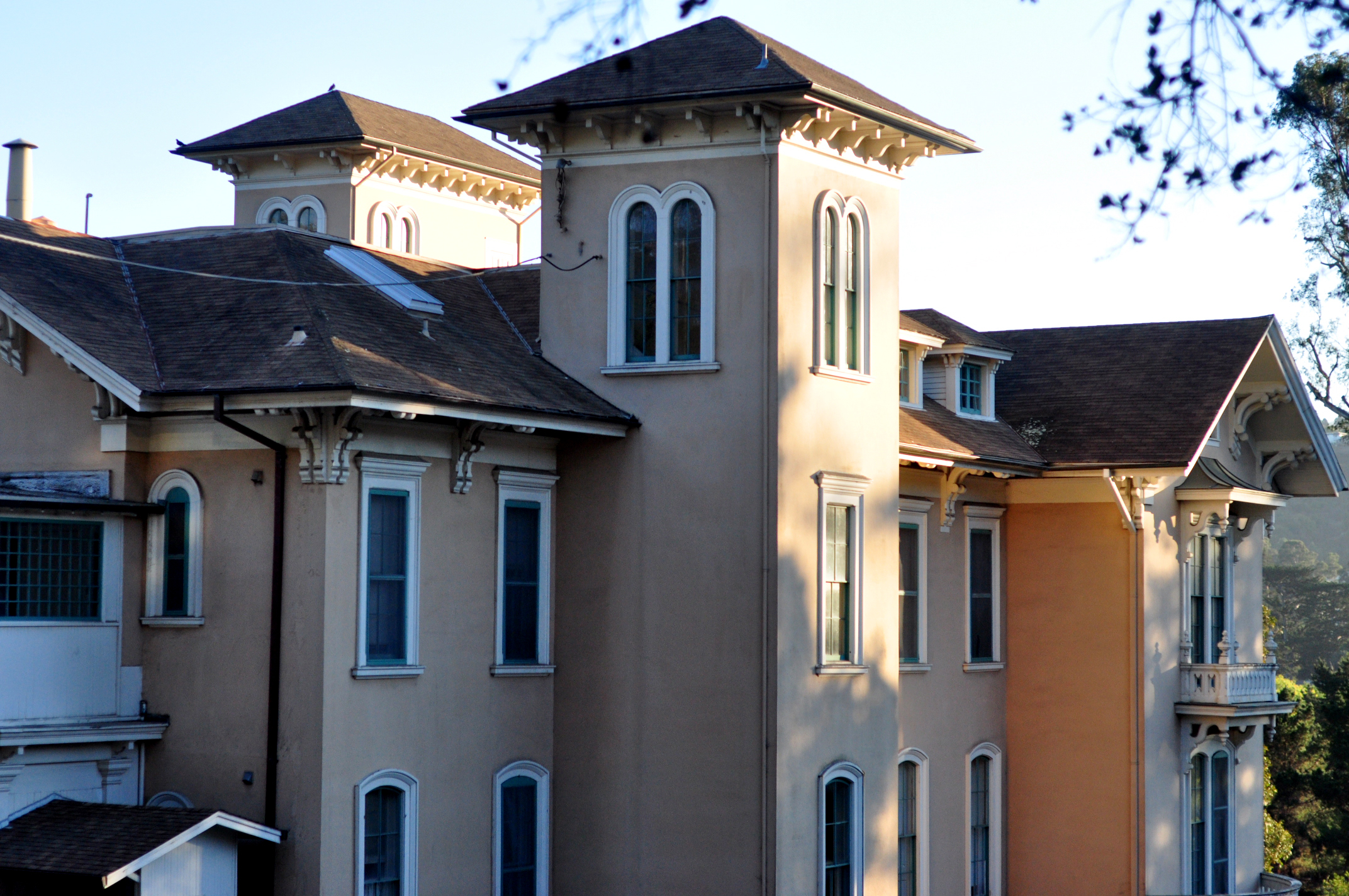
Ralston Hall

The Notre Dame de Namur University campus developed around Ralston Hall Mansion. William Chapman Ralston built Ralston Hall shortly after purchasing the property in 1864. William Ralston was a pivotal figure in the gold and silver bonanzas, which helped Ralston amass wealth. Ralston Hall was built with a steamboat gothic design on the interior, which is rumored to have been influenced by Ralston's love of boating from a young age. The interior of Ralston Hall is strikingly shaped like the inside of a boat. Ralston Hall was built as an entertainment destination. After William Ralston died, his business partner, William Sharon, came to control the mansion. Sharon was a United States senator representing Nevada from 1875 to 1881. Ralston Hall has been used for a variety of jobs throughout its history; Ralston Hall held one of the largest American weddings when William Sharon's daughter Flora married Sir Thomas Fermor-Hesketh of England. The mansion was a finishing school for young women until 1898. Since 1923 Ralston Hall has been affiliated with Notre Dame de Namur University.

The mansion housed admissions, administrative and faculty offices, and its first floor rooms, including a ballroom modeled after the Hall of Mirrors at Versailles, were rented for events. In late 2011, a preliminary assessment of the structural integrity of Ralston Hall suggested that occupants may not be safe in the event of an earthquake. The building was indefinitely unoccupied until funds can be raised to complete a replacement or retrofit of the masonry foundation, in addition to extensive seismic work on the upper floors. The renovation is estimated to cost more than $20 million. It has been announced that the 2025 sale to the University of California System will fund a full renovation of Ralston Hall.

== Organization and administration ==
Notre Dame de Namur University is a nonprofit organization governed by a board of trustees.

The university is organized into three schools: the School of Business and Management, the School of Education, and the School of Psychology. Each school is led by a dean.

University administration consists of a president, a provost, vice presidents for enrollment management, advancement, and finance and administration, a dean of students, and deans of the three schools.

== Academics ==
Notre Dame de Namur University offers master's degrees. It is accredited by the WASC Senior College and University Commission. Although the accreditation is valid, the institution is accredited "with Notice of Concern" by the commission due to ongoing financial challenges.

== Sister Dorothy Stang Center ==
The Sister Dorothy Stang Center for Social Justice and Community Engagement (DSC) was established on the Notre Dame de Namur University campus in honor of the work of Sister Dorothy Stang, SNDdeN, who was murdered in Brazil due to her efforts to aid the poor farmers and the environment in that country. The center works to increase awareness of social and environmental justice issues, as well as encourage dialogue, community service, engagement, and activism in these areas. Members of the university and the larger community can work with the DSC to create positive social change, and come to a greater understanding of the issues that affect the community.

== Athletics ==
The Notre Dame de Namur University Argonauts were the athletic teams of the university until 2020. The university mascot, the Argonaut, was named for the mythical Argonauts who sailed with Jason in search of the Golden Fleece. The team colors blue, gold and white reflected the colors of the university.

At the time of the discontinuation, NDNU had 12 varsity sports. Men's sports included basketball, cross country, golf, lacrosse, soccer, and track & field; women's sports included basketball, cross country, soccer, softball, tennis, track & field, and volleyball.

Notre Dame athletics competed in the Division II level of the National Collegiate Athletic Association (NCAA), primarily competing in the Northern California Athletic Conference (NCAC) until after the 1996–97 season when the conference disbanded. NDNU joined the National Association of Intercollegiate Athletics (NAIA) and the California Pacific Conference (Cal Pac) from 1996–97 to 2004–05. The university re-joined the NCAA and the D-II ranks in 2005 when the Pacific West Conference (PacWest) voted to admit Notre Dame de Namur University.

The university most recently competed at the Division II level as members of the Pacific West, except for men's lacrosse, which had an Independent affiliation after leaving the Western Intercollegiate Lacrosse Association at the end of the 2014 spring season (2013–14 school year). In March 2020, the university announced the discontinuation of the athletics programs effective at the conclusion of the Spring 2020 semester. The decision was part of various changes to the university, citing an on-going financial situation and declining enrollment.

== Diversity ==
Notre Dame de Namur University is one of the most diverse private colleges in California, qualifying as both a Hispanic Serving Institution (HSI) and an Asian American Native American Pacific Islander Serving Institution (AANAPISI). The university's commitment to diversity is based on the Hallmarks of a Notre Dame de Namur Learning Community, which states, "We embrace the gift of diversity."

== Notable alumni ==
- Lailee Bakhtiar, poet, journalist, author, novelist
- Eddie Baza Calvo, politician, governor of Guam
- Belo Cipriani, writer and LGBT activist
- Anton del Rosario, professional soccer player
- Simon Enciso, professional athlete in basketball
- Susan Heon, Olympic athlete in swimming
- Abigail Campbell Kawānanakoa, politician and Princess of Hawaii
- Morghan King, Olympic athlete in weightlifting
- Matthew Mbu Junior, politician, senator of Federal Republic of Nigeria
- Barbara Morgan, NASA astronaut
- Tessa Prieto-Valdes, columnist, media personality, socialite
- Dorothy Stang, class of 1964; activist, Sister of Notre Dame de Namur
- Maria Cristina Villanova de Arbenz, politician and First Lady of Guatemala
- Susie Wind, visual artist
- Emily Wu, author and novelist
- Wang Yi, Olympic athlete in volleyball
