= Pacific West Conference =

NCAA Division II conference

- Association: NCAA
- Founded: 1992; 34 years ago
- Commissioner: Brad Jones
- Sports fielded: 15 (16 in 2026); men's: 7; women's: 8
- Division: Division II
- No. of teams: 10
- Headquarters: Irvine, California
- Region: Pacific States
- Website: thepacwest.com

Locations

The Pacific West Conference (also known as the PacWest) is a college athletic conference affiliated with the National Collegiate Athletic Association (NCAA) at the Division II level. Member institutions are located in California and Hawaii.

The conference sponsors the following sports: basketball, cross country, golf, soccer, tennis and track & field outdoor for both men and women; baseball for men only; softball and volleyball for women only. The newest PacWest sports are men's tennis and women's golf, both added in 2012–13.

== History ==
=== Formation ===
PacWest Conference (California)
Location of PacWest members: current
PacWest Conference (Hawaii)
Location of PacWest members: current

The PacWest was formed in 1992 when the Great Northwest Conference (a men's conference) merged with the Continental Divide Conference (a women's conference containing some of the same members), in response to the departures of several members and new NCAA legislation requiring conferences to have at least six members. In addition, some Hawai'i-based colleges joined the new conference.

At one point the conference expanded to 16 members, but in 2001, member schools from Washington, Alaska, California, and Oregon left to form the new Great Northwest Athletic Conference.

With the departure of the final two mainland members, Montana State University–Billings and Western New Mexico University, to join the Heartland Conference in 2005, the four Hawai'i universities played one season as "independents" after receiving a waiver from the NCAA to keep the conference in name, while searching for new members, because in order to be eligible for conference membership in the NCAA, a conference must consist of a minimum of six member institutions who sponsor at least ten sports, with two team sports for each gender.

=== New PacWest Conference ===
To comply with conference membership regulations, Hawai'i Pacific (HPU), Chaminade, BYU–Hawai'i and Hawai'i–Hilo added new sports to their programs. In July 2005, the Pacific West Conference voted to admit Notre Dame de Namur University as a provisional member, as it moved from the NAIA to the NCAA Division II. Grand Canyon University, formerly an NCAA D-II Independent, also joined the conference, returning the Pacific West Conference to full conference status with six members. Dixie State College of Utah joined the conference for the 2007–08 season. In 2008, it was announced that Academy of Art University would join the conference in the 2009–10 season as the conference's 8th member. In 2009 it was announced that Dominican University of California would join the conference in the 2009–10 season as the conference's 9th member. That same year, the conference announced it would sponsor baseball as its 11th sport, with Hawai'i Pacific University, University of Hawai'i–Hilo, Dixie State College of Utah (now Utah Tech University), and Grand Canyon University competing on a Division II level.

=== Recent expansion and contraction ===
The conference began expansion in 2010 when the PacWest invited California Baptist University, from the NAIA's Golden State Athletic Conference (GSAC) to join the conference beginning with the 2011–12 school year. On June 1, 2011, the conference announced the additions of Azusa Pacific University, Fresno Pacific University and Point Loma Nazarene University, all members of the GSAC, which began Pacific West Conference play during the 2012–13 season. Holy Names University was also added to the PacWest in 2011, but did not begin the NCAA Division II membership process from the NAIA until July 13, 2012. As part of the transition process from NAIA to NCAA Holy Names remained ineligible for NCAA postseason play through 2015–16. On November 27, 2012, Grand Canyon announced it would leave the PacWest after the 2012–13 school year to accept an invitation to join the Division I Western Athletic Conference. In July 2016, it was announced that Biola University would join the PacWest for the 2017–18 season. In October 2016, Dixie State announced that it would transition from the PacWest to the Rocky Mountain Athletic Conference after the 2017–18 school year. On January 13, 2017, California Baptist announced that it will leave the PacWest in favor of moving up to NCAA Division I. On March 23, 2020, Notre Dame de Namur announced the cessation of all its athletics after the 2019–20 school year.

=== Chronological timeline ===
- 1992 – The Pacific West Conference (PacWest) was founded due to a merger of the men's sports-only Great Northwest Conference and the women's sports-only Continental Divide Conference (which contained some of the same members). Charter members included the University of Alaska at Anchorage, the University of Alaska at Fairbanks, Chaminade University of Honolulu, Grand Canyon University, the University of Hawaiʻi at Hilo, Montana State University at Billings, Portland State University (only for women's sports) and Seattle Pacific University, beginning the 1992–93 academic year.
- 1994 – Grand Canyon left the PacWest to join the California Collegiate Athletic Association (CCAA) after the 1993–94 academic year; while Western New Mexico University joined the conference in the 1994–95 academic year.
- 1996 – Portland State's women's sports left the PacWest to fully align with their men's sports to join the Division I ranks of the National Collegiate Athletic Association (NCAA) and the Big Sky Conference after the 1995–96 academic year.
- 1998 – Brigham Young University–Hawai'i, Central Washington University, Hawai'i Pacific University, Humboldt State University (now California State Polytechnic University, Humboldt), Saint Martin's University, Western Oregon University and Western Washington University joined the PacWest in the 1998–99 academic year.
- 1999 – Northwest Nazarene University and Seattle University joined the PacWest in the 1999–2000 academic year.
- 2001 – Alaska–Anchorage (UAA), Alaska–Fairbanks (UAF), Central Washington, Humboldt State (now Cal Poly–Humboldt), Northwest Nazarene, Saint Martin's, Seattle, Seattle Pacific, Western Oregon and Western Washington left the PacWest to form the Great Northwest Athletic Conference (GNAC) after the 2000–01 academic year.
- 2005:
  - Montana State–Billings and Western New Mexico left the PacWest to join the Heartland Conference after the 2004–05 academic year.
  - Notre Dame de Namur University joined the PacWest as a provisional full member (along with Grand Canyon re-joining), both effective in the 2005–06 academic year.
- 2007 – Dixie State University (now Utah Tech University) joined the PacWest in the 2007–08 academic year.
- 2009 – Academy of Art University and Dominican University of California joined the PacWest in the 2009–10 academic year.
- 2011 – California Baptist University (Cal Baptist) joined the PacWest in the 2011–12 academic year.
- 2012 – Azusa Pacific University, Fresno Pacific University, Holy Names University and Point Loma Nazarene University joined the PacWest in the 2012–13 academic year.
- 2013:
  - Grand Canyon left the PacWest to join the NCAA Division I ranks and the Western Athletic Conference (WAC) after the 2012–13 academic year.
  - Sonoma State University joined the PacWest as an affiliate member for men's and women's tennis in the 2014 spring season (2013–14 academic year).
- 2014 – California State University, Los Angeles and California State University, Stanislaus joined the PacWest as affiliate members for women's tennis in the 2014 spring season (2013–14 academic year).
- 2015 – Concordia University Irvine joined the PacWest in the 2015–16 academic year.
- 2017:
  - BYU–Hawaii left the PacWest as the school announced that it would discontinue its athletic program after the 2016–17 academic year.
  - Biola University joined the PacWest in the 2017–18 academic year.
- 2018 – Two institutions left the PacWest to join their respective new home primary conferences, both effective after the 2017–18 academic year:
  - Dixie State (now Utah Tech) to join the Rocky Mountain Athletic Conference (RMAC)
  - and Cal Baptist to join the NCAA Division I ranks and the WAC, both effective after the 2017–18 academic year
- 2020 – Notre Dame de Namur left the PacWest as the school announced that it would discontinue its athletic program after the 2019–20 academic year.
- 2021 – Colorado Mesa University and the Metropolitan State University of Denver joined the PacWest as affiliate members for men's and women's tennis in the 2022 spring season (2021–22 academic year).
- 2023:
  - Holy Names left the PacWest after the 2022–23 academic year; as the school ceased operations.
  - Westmont College joined the PacWest in the 2023–24 academic year.
- 2024 – Jessup University, Menlo College and Vanguard University all joined the PacWest in the 2024–25 academic year.
- 2025 – Academy of Art left the PacWest after the 2024–25 academic year; as the school announced that it would discontinue its athletic program.
- 2026:
  - Azusa Pacific left the PacWest to transition to NCAA Division III and join the Southern California Intercollegiate Athletic Conference (SCIAC) in conjunction with the restart of their football program for the 2026 season (2026–27 academic year).
  - Fresno Pacific and Menlo left the PacWest to join the California Collegiate Athletic Association (CCAA) after the 2025–26 academic year. Both schools remained in the PacWest as affiliate members for men's and women's tennis.

== Member schools ==
=== Current members ===
The PacWest currently has 10 full members, all but one are private schools.

| Institution | Location | Founded | Affiliation | Enrollment | Nickname | Joined (Note: Represents the calendar year when fall sports competition begins.) | Colors |
|---|---|---|---|---|---|---|---|
| Biola University | La Mirada, California | 1908 | Evangelical | 5,448 | Eagles | 2017 | |
| Chaminade University of Honolulu | Honolulu, Hawai'i | 1955 | Catholic (S.M.) | 2,369 | Silverswords | 1992 | |
| Concordia University Irvine | Irvine, California | 1976 | Lutheran LCMS | 3,522 | Golden Eagles | 2015 | |
| Dominican University of California | San Rafael, California | 1890 | Catholic (Dominican Sisters) | 1,818 | Penguins | 2009 | |
| Hawai'i Pacific University | Honolulu, Hawai'i | 1965 | Nonsectarian | 4,748 | Sharks | 1998 | |
| University of Hawai'i at Hilo | Hilo, Hawai'i | 1947 | Public | 2,781 | Vulcans | 1992 | |
| Jessup University | Rocklin, California | 1939 | Nondenominational | 1,484 | Warriors | 2024 | |
| Point Loma Nazarene University | San Diego, California | 1902 | Nazarene | 4,813 | Sea Lions | 2012 | |
| Vanguard University | Costa Mesa, California | 1920 | Assemblies of God | 2,219 | Lions | 2024 | |
| Westmont College | Santa Barbara, California | 1937 | Christian | 1,312 | Warriors | 2023 | |

=== Affiliate members ===
The PacWest currently has six affiliate members, three are public schools:

| Institution | Location | Founded | Affiliation | Enrollment (Fall 2018) | Nickname | Joined (Note: Represents the calendar year when fall sports competition begins.) | Colors | PacWest sport(s) | Primary conference |
|---|---|---|---|---|---|---|---|---|---|
| California State University, Los Angeles | Los Angeles, California | 1947 | Public (Note: Part of the California State University System.) | 22,740 | Golden Eagles | 2014 | | women's tennis | California (CCAA) |
| California State University, Stanislaus | Turlock, California | 1957 | Public | 9,295 | Warriors | 2014 | | women's tennis | California (CCAA) |
| Colorado Mesa University | Grand Junction, Colorado | 1925 | Public | 10,139 | Mavericks | 2020; 2026 (Note: Colorado Mesa left the PacWest as a tennis affiliate after the 2025–26 school year, before rejoining in 2026–27.) | | men's tennis | Rocky Mountain (RMAC) |
| Colorado Mesa University | Grand Junction, Colorado | 1925 | Public | 10,139 | Mavericks | 2020; 2026 | | women's tennis | Rocky Mountain (RMAC) |
| Fresno Pacific University | Fresno, California | 1944 | Mennonite | 2,889 | Sunbirds | 2026 (Note: Measured from departure from full PacWest membership.) | | men's tennis | California (CCAA) |
| Fresno Pacific University | Fresno, California | 1944 | Mennonite | 2,889 | Sunbirds | 2026 | | women's tennis | California (CCAA) |
| Fresno Pacific University | Fresno, California | 1944 | Mennonite | 2,889 | Sunbirds | 2026 | | STUNT | California (CCAA) |
| Menlo College | Atherton, California | 1927 | Nonsectarian | 810 | Oaks | 2026 | | men's tennis | California (CCAA) |
| Menlo College | Atherton, California | 1927 | Nonsectarian | 810 | Oaks | 2026 | | women's tennis | California (CCAA) |
| Northwest Nazarene University | Nampa, Idaho | 1913 | Nazarene | 1,646 | Nighthawks | 2026 | | STUNT | Great Northwest (GNAC) |

=== Former members ===
The PacWest had 23 former full members, all but ten were public schools:

| Institution | Location | Founded | Affiliation | Enrollment | Nickname | Joined (Note: Represents the calendar year when fall sports competition begins.) | Left (Note: Represents the calendar year when spring sports competition ends.) | Current conference |
|---|---|---|---|---|---|---|---|---|
| Academy of Art University | San Francisco, California | 1929 | For-profit | 7,805 | Urban Knights | 2009 | 2025 | N/A (Note: Academy of Art dropped its athletics program after the 2024–25 school year.) |
| University of Alaska Anchorage | Anchorage, Alaska | 1954 | Public | 16,242 | Seawolves | 1992 | 2001 | Great Northwest (GNAC) |
| University of Alaska Fairbanks | Fairbanks, Alaska | 1917 | Public | 9,380 | Nanooks | 1992 | 2001 | Great Northwest (GNAC) |
| Azusa Pacific University | Azusa, California | 1899 | Evangelical | 6,272 | Cougars | 2012 | 2026 | Southern California (SCIAC) (Note: Current NCAA Division III athletic conference.) |
| Brigham Young University–Hawai'i | Laie, Hawai'i | 1955 | LDS Church | 3,176 | Seasiders | 1998 | 2017 | N/A (Note: BYU–Hawaii dropped its athletic program after the 2016–17 school year.) |
| California Baptist University | Riverside, California | 1950 | Baptist | 11,491 | Lancers | 2011 | 2017 | Western (WAC) (Note: Current NCAA Division I athletic conference.) (Big West (BWC) in 2026) |
| Central Washington University | Ellensburg, Washington | 1891 | Public | 10,145 | Wildcats | 1998 | 2001 | Great Northwest (GNAC) |
| Dixie State University (Note: Currently known as Utah Tech University since 2022.) | St. George, Utah | 1911 | Public | 12,650 | Trailblazers | 2007 | 2018 | Western (WAC) (Big Sky in 2026) |
| Grand Canyon University | Phoenix, Arizona | 1949 | Christian (For-profit) (Note: Grand Canyon's for-profit status is disputed. The U.S. Department of Education considers it for-profit, but the NCAA, the state of Arizona, and the Internal Revenue Service consider it a nonprofit.) | 25,000 | Antelopes | 1992; 2005 | 1993; 2013 | Mountain West (MW) |
| Fresno Pacific University | Fresno, California | 1944 | Mennonite | 2,889 | Sunbirds | 2012 | 2026 | California (CCAA) |
| Holy Names University | Oakland, California | 1868 | Catholic (SNJM) | 1,331 | Hawks | 2012 | 2023 | Closed in 2023 |
| Humboldt State University (Note: Currently known as California State Polytechnic University, Humboldt since January 26, 2022.) | Arcata, California | 1913 | Public | 7,774 | Lumberjacks | 1998 | 2001 | California (CCAA) |
| Menlo College | Atherton, California | 1927 | Nonsectarian | 810 | Oaks | 2024 | 2026 | California (CCAA) |
| Montana State University Billings | Billings, Montana | 1927 | Public | 4,600 | Yellowjackets | 1992 | 2005 | Great Northwest (GNAC) |
| Northwest Nazarene University | Nampa, Idaho | 1913 | Nazarene | 2,000 | Crusaders | 1999 | 2001 | Great Northwest (GNAC) |
| Notre Dame de Namur University | Belmont, California | 1851 | Catholic | 1,492 | Argonauts | 2005 | 2020 | N/A (Note: Notre Dame de Namur dropped its athletic program after the 2019–20 school year.) |
| Portland State University (Note: Portland State joined the PacWest only for women's sports.) | Portland, Oregon | 1946 | Public | 27,285 | Vikings | 1992 | 1996 | Big Sky (BSC) |
| Saint Martin's University | Lacey, Washington | 1895 | Catholic (Benedictines) | 1,628 | Saints | 1998 | 2001 | Great Northwest (GNAC) |
| Seattle University (Note: Seattle competed in some sports during its tenure in the PacWest.) | Seattle, Washington | 1891 | Catholic (Jesuit) | 7,755 | Redhawks (Note: Prior to January 2000, Seattle's nickname was the Chieftains.) | 1999 | 2001 | West Coast (WCC) |
| Seattle Pacific University | Seattle, Washington | 1891 | Free Methodist | 3,773 | Falcons | 1992 | 2001 | Great Northwest (GNAC) |
| Simon Fraser University | Burnaby, British Columbia | 1965 | Public | 35,604 | Red Leafs (Note: Simon Fraser's (SFU) nickname during its tenure in the PacWest was the Clan.) | 1998 | 1999 | Great Northwest (GNAC) (U Sports and CWUAA in 2027) |
| Western New Mexico University | Silver City, New Mexico | 1893 | Public | 3,820 | Mustangs | 1994 | 2005 | Lone Star (LSC) |
| Western Oregon University | Monmouth, Oregon | 1856 | Public | 6,233 | Wolves | 1998 | 2001 | Great Northwest (GNAC) |
| Western Washington University | Bellingham, Washington | 1893 | Public | 13,070 | Vikings | 1998 | 2001 | Great Northwest (GNAC) |

=== Former affiliate members ===
The PacWest had two former affiliate members, both public schools:

| Institution | Location | Founded | Affiliation | Enrollment | Nickname | Joined (Note: Represents the calendar year when fall sports competition begins.) | Left (Note: Represents the calendar year when spring sports competition ends.) | Colors | PacWest sport(s) | Current conference |
|---|---|---|---|---|---|---|---|---|---|---|
| Metropolitan State University of Denver (MSU Denver) | Denver, Colorado | 1965 | Public | 17,678 | Roadrunners | 2020 | 2025 | | men's tennis | Rocky Mountain (RMAC) |
| Metropolitan State University of Denver (MSU Denver) | Denver, Colorado | 1965 | Public | 17,678 | Roadrunners | 2020 | 2025 | | women's tennis | Rocky Mountain (RMAC) |
| Sonoma State University | Rohnert Park, California | 1960 | Public | 9,201 | Seawolves | 2013 | 2020 | | men's tennis | California (CCAA) |
| Sonoma State University | Rohnert Park, California | 1960 | Public | 9,201 | Seawolves | 2013 | 2020 | | women's tennis | California (CCAA) |

=== Membership timeline ===
Full member (non-football) Associate member (sport)

== National championships ==
Academy of Art

- Women's outdoor track & field (2013)

Azusa Pacific

- Women's outdoor track & field (2021, 2023)

BYU–Hawai'i

- Men's tennis (2002, 2003)
- Women's tennis (1999, 2000, 2002, 2003, 2004, 2006, 2007)
- Women's volleyball (1999, 2002)

Grand Canyon

- Men's soccer (1996)
- Men's indoor track & field (2012)

Hawai'i Pacific

- Women's volleyball (1998, 2000)
- Softball (2010)
- Men's tennis (2016)

Point Loma Nazarene

- Women's soccer (2023)

== Sports ==
Conference sports
| Sport | Men's | Women's |
|---|---|---|
| Baseball | ✓ | |
| Basketball | ✓ | ✓ |
| Cross Country | ✓ | ✓ |
| Golf | ✓ | ✓ |
| Soccer | ✓ | ✓ |
| Softball | | ✓ |
| Tennis | ✓ | ✓ |
| Track & Field Outdoor | ✓ | ✓ |
| Volleyball | | ✓ |

=== Men's sponsored sports by school ===
| School | Baseball | Basketball | Cross Country | Golf | Soccer | Tennis | Track & Field Outdoor | Total PWC Sports |
|---|---|---|---|---|---|---|---|---|
| Biola | ✓ | ✓ | ✓ | ✓ | ✓ | ✓ | ✓ | 7 |
| Chaminade | ✓ | ✓ | ✓ | ✓ | ✓ | ✗ | ✗ | 5 |
| Concordia–Irvine | ✓ | ✓ | ✓ | ✗ | ✓ | ✓ | ✓ | 6 |
| Dominican | ✗ | ✓ | ✓ | ✓ | ✓ | ✗ | ✓ | 5 |
| Hawai'i Pacific | ✓ | ✓ | ✓ | ✓ | ✓ | ✓ | ✗ | 6 |
| Hawai'i–Hilo | ✓ | ✓ | ✗ | ✓ | ✓ | ✓ | ✗ | 5 |
| Jessup | ✓ | ✓ | ✓ | ✓ | ✓ | ✓ | ✓ | 7 |
| Point Loma Nazarene | ✓ | ✓ | ✗ | ✗ | ✓ | ✓ | ✗ | 4 |
| Vanguard | ✓ | ✓ | ✓ | ✓ | ✓ | ✗ | ✓ | 6 |
| Westmont | ✓ | ✓ | ✓ | ✓ | ✓ | ✓ | ✓ | 7 |
| Totals | 9 | 10 | 8 | 8 | 10 | 7+3 | 6 | 58+3 |
Affiliate Members
| Colorado Mesa | | | | | | ✓ | | 1 |
| Fresno Pacific | | | | | | ✓ | | 1 |
| Menlo | | | | | | ✓ | | 1 |

=== Women's sponsored sports by school ===
| School | Basketball | Cross Country | Golf | Soccer | Softball | STUNT | Tennis | Track & Field Outdoor | Volleyball | Total PWC Sports |
|---|---|---|---|---|---|---|---|---|---|---|
| Biola | ✓ | ✓ | ✓ | ✓ | ✓ | ✗ | ✓ | ✓ | ✓ | 8 |
| Chaminade | ✓ | ✓ | ✗ | ✓ | ✓ | ✗ | ✓ | ✗ | ✓ | 6 |
| Concordia–Irvine | ✓ | ✓ | ✗ | ✓ | ✓ | ✓ | ✓ | ✓ | ✓ | 8 |
| Dominican | ✓ | ✓ | ✓ | ✓ | ✓ | ✗ | ✓ | ✓ | ✓ | 8 |
| Hawai'i Pacific | ✓ | ✓ | ✓ | ✓ | ✓ | ✓ | ✓ | ✗ | ✓ | 8 |
| Hawai'i–Hilo | ✓ | ✓ | ✓ | ✓ | ✓ | ✗ | ✓ | ✗ | ✓ | 7 |
| Jessup | ✓ | ✓ | ✓ | ✓ | ✓ | ✓ | ✓ | ✓ | ✓ | 9 |
| Point Loma Nazarene | ✓ | ✓ | ✓ | ✓ | ✗ | ✗ | ✓ | ✓ | ✓ | 7 |
| Vanguard | ✓ | ✓ | ✓ | ✓ | ✓ | ✓ | ✗ | ✓ | ✓ | 8 |
| Westmont | ✓ | ✓ | ✓ | ✓ | ✗ | ✓ | ✓ | ✓ | ✓ | 8 |
| Totals | 10 | 10 | 8 | 10 | 8 | 5+2 | 9+5 | 7 | 10 | 77+7 |
Affiliate Members
| Cal State Los Angeles | | | | | | | ✓ | | | 1 |
| Colorado Mesa | | | | | | | ✓ | | | 1 |
| Fresno Pacific | | | | | | ✓ | ✓ | | | 2 |
| Menlo | | | | | | | ✓ | | | 1 |
| Northwest Nazarene | | | | | | ✓ | | | | 1 |
| Stanislaus State | | | | | | | ✓ | | | 1 |

=== Other sponsored sports by school ===
Future members indicated in gray.

| School | Men | | | | | | Women | | | | | |
| School | Lacrosse | Swimming & Diving | Track & Field Indoor | Volleyball (Note: De facto Division I sport. The NCAA men's volleyball championship is open to members of Divisions I and II, and the NCAA championships in beach volleyball, men's and women's water polo, and women's wrestling are open to members of all three NCAA divisions.) | Water Polo | Wrestling | Beach Volleyball | Lacrosse | Swimming & Diving | Track & Field Indoor | Water Polo | Wrestling |
|---|---|---|---|---|---|---|---|---|---|---|---|---|
| Biola | | PCSC | IND | | | | | | PCSC | IND | | |
| Chaminade | | | | | | | IND | | | | | |
| Concordia Irvine | RMAC | PCSC | IND | MPSF | WWPA | | IND | | PCSC | IND | WWPA | |
| Dominican | RMAC | | | | | | | MEC | | | | |
| Hawaii Pacific | | | | | | | IND | | | | | |
| Jessup | | | TBA | MPSF | | | | | | TBA | | |
| Vanguard | | | TBA | MPSF | | MPSF | IND | | | TBA | | MPSF |
| Westmont | | | IND | | | | | | PCSC | IND | | |

== Conference facilities ==
| Team | Basketball Arena | Capacity |
|---|---|---|
| Biola | Richard Chase Gymnasium | 2,400 |
| Chaminade | McCabe Gymnasium | 2,800 |
| Concordia Irvine | CU Arena | 2,400 |
| Dominican | Conlan Center | 1,285 |
| Hawai'i Pacific | Shark Tank – St Francis School | |
| Hawai'i–Hilo | Afook-Chinen Civic Auditorium | 3,800 |
| Jessup | Warrior Arena | —N/a |
| Point Loma Nazarene | Golden Gym | 1,600 |
| Vanguard | Peterson Gymnasium (Note: At Orange Coast College.) | 1,500 |
| Westmont | Murchison Gymnasium | 1,179 |
