= Big Sky Conference women's soccer tournament =

- Conference soccer championship
- Sport: College soccer
- Conference: Big Sky Conference
- Number of teams: 6
- Format: Single-elimination
- Current stadium: Lumberjack Stadium
- Current location: Flagstaff, Arizona
- Played: 1997–present
- Last contest: 2026
- Current champion: Weber State (5th title)
- Most championships: Montana (8 titles)
- TV partner: ESPN+
- Official website: bigskyconf.com/wsoc

The Big Sky Conference women's soccer tournament is the conference championship tournament in soccer for the Big Sky Conference. The tournament has been held every year since 1997. It is played under a single-elimination format and seeding is based on regular season records. The winner, declared conference champion, receives the conference's automatic bid to the NCAA Division I women's soccer championship.

Montana is the most winning team of the competition with 7 titles.

== Format ==
The teams are seeded based on the order of finish in the conference's round robin regular season. The top six finishers qualify for the tournament. Tiebreakers begin with the result of the head-to-head matchup. The teams are then placed in a single-elimination bracket, with the top two seeds receiving a first round bye, until meeting in a final championship game. After two overtime period, ties are broken by shootout rounds, with the winner of the shootout advancing.

== Champions ==
=== Finals ===
- (1) – title number
- a.e.t. – match went to extra time
- p – match decided by a penalty shootout after extra time
- – winning team won regular season

=== By year ===
Ed.	Year	Champion	Score	Runner-up	Venue / City	MVP	Ref.
1	1997	Montana (1)	4–2	Weber State	South Campus Stadium • Missoula, Mt	Karen Hardy, Montana	
2	1998	Weber State (1)	2–1	Montana	P.E. Playfield • Ogden, Ut	Lisa Anthony, Weber State	
3	1999	Montana (2)	2–0	Northern Arizona	South Campus Stadium • Missoula, Mt	Misty Hall, Montana	
4	2000	Montana (3)	1–0	Northern Arizona	South Campus Stadium • Missoula, Mt	Amy Wronksi, Montana	
5	2001	Idaho State (1)	1–0	Weber State	P.E. Playfield • Ogden, Ut	Brooke Alton, Idaho State	
6	2002	Idaho State (2)	1–0	Portland State	Davis Field • Pocatello, Id	Shannon Boyle, Idaho State	
7	2003	Idaho State (3)	1–0	Montana	St. Joseph's • Ogden, Ut	Hollie Christensen, Idaho State	
8	2004	Weber State (2)	1–0	Montana	PGE Park • Portland, Or	Rochelle Hoover, Weber State	
9	2005	Weber State (3)	4–1	Northern Arizona	Lew Joseph Field • Ogden, Ut	Rochelle Hoover, Weber State	
10	2006	Idaho State (4)	2–2 (4–3 p)	Sacramento State	Davis Field • Pocatello, Id	Lyndsay Gensler, Idaho State	
11	2007	Sacramento State (1)	3–0	Northern Colorado	Hornet Field • Sacramento, Ca	Katie McCoy, Sacramento State	
12	2008	Northern Arizona (1)	2–1	Weber State	Wildcat Soccer Field • Ogden, Ut	Cee Cee Odorfer, Northern Arizona	
13	2009	Northern Arizona (2)	4–0	Idaho State	PCC Rock Field • Portland, Or	Jenna Samora, Northern Arizona	
14	2010	Sacramento State (2)	1–0	Northern Arizona	Max Spilsbury Field • Flagstaff, Az	Elece McBride, Sacramento State	
15	2011	Montana (4)	1–1 (4–3 p)	Weber State	Jackson Stadium • Greeley, Co	India Watne, Montana	
16	2012	Idaho State (5)	0–0 (4–3 p)	Montana	Davis Field • Pocatello, Id	Sheridan Hapsic, Idaho State	
17	2013	Weber State (4)	0–0 (3–0 p)	Portland State	Hillsboro Stadium • Hillsboro, Or	Ryann Waldman, Weber State	
18	2014	Northern Arizona (3)	2–1	Idaho State	South Campus Stadium • Missoula, Mt	Haley Wingender, Northern Arizona	
19	2015	Northern Colorado (1)	1–1 (3–0 p)	Idaho	Guy Wicks Field • Moscow, Id	Madeline Burdick, Northern Colorado	
20	2016	Eastern Washington (1)	1–1 (4–3 p)	Northern Arizona	EWU Soccer Complex • Cheney, Wa	Chloe Williams, Eastern Washington	
21	2017	Eastern Washington (2)	3–0	Northern Co	EWU Soccer Complex • Cheney, Wa	Chloe Williams, Eastern Washington	
22	2018	Montana (5)	1–0	Northern Colorado	Wildcat Soccer Field • Ogden, Ut	Janessa Fowler, Montana	
23	2019	Northern Colorado (2)	1–0	Eastern Washington	Jackson Stadium • Greeley, Co	Taylor Bray, Northern Colorado	
24	2020	Montana (6)	(Cancelled)	Northern Arizona	Wildcat Soccer Field • Ogden, Utah	Taylor Stoeger, Mt	
25	2021	Montana (7)	1–0	Weber State	Jackson Stadium • Greeley, Co	Camilla Xu, Montana	
26	2022	Northern Arizona (4)	0–0 (4–3 p)	Idaho	Jackson Stadium • Greeley, Co	Trinity Corcoran, Northern Arizona	
27	2023	Idaho (1)	1–0	Northern Arizona	Lumberjack Stadium • Flagstaff, Az	Rebekah Reyes, Idaho	
28	2024	Sacramento State (3)	0–0 (7–6 p)	Idaho	South Campus Stadium • Missoula, Mt	Sierra Sonko, Sacramento State	
29	2025	Montana (8)	0–0 (4–2 p)	Weber State	South Campus Stadium • Missoula, Mt	Ashlyn Dvorak, Montana	
30	2026	Weber State (5)	1–0 (a.e.t.)	Northern Colorado	South Campus Stadium • Missoula, Mt	Sayler Schlosser, Weber State	

=== By school ===
As of 2026 Tournament

School	Apps.	W	L	T	Pct.	Finals	Titles	Title Years
Cal State Northridge	1	0	1	0	.000	0	0	—
Eastern Washington	13	6	10	2	.412	3	2	2016, 2017
Idaho	10	6	6	4	.500	4	1	2023
Idaho State	10	10	4	4	.667	7	5	2001, 2002, 2003, 2006, 2012
North Dakota	0	0	0	0	–	0	0	—
Northern Arizona	21	16	14	6	.528	11	4	2008, 2009, 2014, 2022
Northern Colorado	13	10	10	2	.500	6	2	2015, 2019
Montana	24	18	13	7	.566	12	8	1997, 1999, 2000, 2011, 2018, 2020, 2021, 2025
Portland State	17	4	14	4	.273	2	0	—
Sacramento State	15	6	10	6	.409	4	3	2007, 2010, 2024
Southern Utah	0	0	0	0	–	0	0	—
Utah Tech	1	0	0	1	.500	0	0	—
Weber State	19	15	10	7	.578	11	5	1998, 2004, 2005, 2013, 2026

Teams in italics no longer sponsor women's soccer in the Big Sky.
