= 2017 Big Sky Conference women's soccer tournament =

- Classification: Division I
- Teams: 6
- Matches: 5
- Attendance: 471
- Site: EWU Soccer Complex; Cheney, Washington
- Champions: Eastern Washington (2nd title)
- Winning coach: Chad Bodnar (2nd title)

2017 Big Sky Conference women's soccer standings
	Conf.						Overall
Team	W		L		T	PCT	W		L		T	PCT
Eastern Washington †‡^{y} ‍‍‍	8	–	1	–	1	.850	16	–	6	–	1	.717
Montana ‍‍‍	5	–	2	–	3	.650	10	–	7	–	4	.571
Northern Colorado ‍‍‍	5	–	3	–	2	.600	13	–	7	–	2	.636
Portland State ‍‍‍	5	–	4	–	1	.550	9	–	10	–	1	.475
Northern Arizona ‍‍‍	4	–	5	–	1	.450	9	–	10	–	1	.475
Sacramento State ‍‍‍	3	–	3	–	4	.500	8	–	8	–	4	.500
Idaho ‍‍‍	4	–	5	–	1	.450	8	–	9	–	2	.474
North Dakota ‍‍‍	4	–	5	–	1	.450	6	–	8	–	4	.444
Southern Utah ‍‍‍	4	–	6	–	0	.400	5	–	13	–	0	.278
Weber State ‍‍‍	2	–	5	–	3	.350	3	–	12	–	3	.250
Idaho State ‍‍‍	2	–	7	–	1	.250	3	–	14	–	1	.194
† – Conference champion ‡ – 2017 Big Sky Tournament champion y – Invited to the NCAA tournament As of November 11, 2017; Rankings from United Soccer Coaches Poll; Source:The Big Sky Conference

The 2017 Big Sky Conference women's soccer tournament was the postseason women's soccer tournament for the Big Sky Conference held from November 1 to 5, 2017. The five-match tournament took place at EWU Soccer Complex, home of the regular-season champions Eastern Washington Eagles. The six-team single-elimination tournament consisted of three rounds based on seeding from regular season conference play. The Eastern Washington Eagles were the defending champions and successfully defended their title, defeating the Northern Colorado Bears 3–0 in the final. This was the second Big Sky tournament title for the Eastern Washington women's soccer program, both of which have come under the direction of head coach Chad Bodnar.

== Bracket ==
First round Wednesday, Nov. 1
4	Portland State	1
5	Northern Arizona	0
3	Northern Colorado	2
6	Sacramento State	0

Semifinals; Friday, Nov. 3
1	Eastern Washington	2
4	Portland State	1
2	Montana	1
3	Northern Colorado	2^{2OT}

Final; Sunday, Nov. 5
1	Eastern Washington	3
3	Northern Colorado	0

== Schedule ==
=== First Round ===
November 1, 2017	#3 Northern Colorado	2–0	#6 Sacramento State	Cheney, Washington
10:05 a.m. PDT	Taylor Bray 40'; Olivia Seddon 53'	Report		Stadium: EWU Soccer Complex; Attendance: 42; Referee: Jesus Hernandez; Assistant referees: Saeed Askar; Jeff Purcell; Fourth official: Tony Richardson

November 1, 2017	#4 Portland State	1–0	#5 Northern Arizona	Cheney, Washington
1:05 p.m. PDT	Regan Russell 70'	Report		Stadium: EWU Soccer Complex; Attendance: 34; Referee: Matthew Hamlin; Assistant referees: Tony Richardson; Sabrina Osman; Fourth official: Jeff Purcell

=== Semifinals ===
November 3, 2017	#2 Montana	1–2 (a.e.t.)	#3 Northern Colorado	Cheney, Washington
10:05 a.m. PDT	Alexa Coyle 17'	Report	72' Mariel Gutierrez; 104' Maddie Roberts	Stadium: EWU Soccer Complex; Attendance: 78; Referee: Joe Tompkins; Assistant referees: Kelsey Harms; Saeed Askar; Fourth official: Jason Damschen

November 3, 2017	#1 Eastern Washington	2–1	#4 Portland State	Cheney, Washington
1:05 p.m. PDT	Jenny Chavez 7'; Brooke Dunbar 53'	Report	80' Tea Poore	Stadium: EWU Soccer Complex; Attendance: 134; Referee: Ben Oakley; Assistant referees: Elorm Atisu; Sabrina Osman; Fourth official: Kelsey Harms

=== Final ===
November 5, 2017	#1 Eastern Washington	3–0	#3 Northern Colorado	Cheney, Washington
12:05 p.m. PST	Savannah Hoekstra 62' (pen.); Chloe Williams 75' (pen.); Alexis Stephenson 78'	Report		Stadium: EWU Soccer Complex; Attendance: 183; Referee: Lucas Brooks; Assistant referees: Matthew Hamlin; Jeff Ripley; Fourth official: Charles Woolley

== Statistics ==
=== Goalscorers ===
1 Goal

- Taylor Bray - Northern Colorado
- Jenny Chavez - Eastern Washington
- Alexa Coyle - Montana
- Brooke Dunbar - Eastern Washington
- Mariel Gutierrez - Northern Colorado
- Savannah Hoekstra - Eastern Washington
- Tea Poore - Portland State
- Maddie Roberts - Northern Colorado
- Regan Russell - Portland State
- Olivia Seddon - Northern Colorado
- Alexis Stephenson - Eastern Washington
- Chloe Williams - Eastern Washington
