= 2023 Big Sky Conference women's soccer tournament =

American college soccer tournament

- Classification: Division I
- Teams: 6
- Matches: 5
- Attendance: 2,614
- Site: Lumberjack Stadium; Flagstaff, Arizona
- Champions: Idaho (1st title)
- Winning coach: Jeremy Clevenger (1st title)
- MVP: Rebekah Reyes (Idaho)
- Broadcast: ESPN+

2023 Big Sky Conference women's soccer standings
	Conf.						Overall
Team	W		L		T	PCT	W		L		T	PCT
Montana ‍†‍‍	7	–	0	–	1	.938	13	–	3	–	3	.763
Idaho ‍‍‡‍^{y}	5	–	2	–	1	.688	12	–	5	–	2	.684
Portland State ‍‍‍	4	–	2	–	2	.625	8	–	8	–	2	.500
Northern Arizona ‍‍‍	4	–	3	–	1	.563	11	–	6	–	3	.625
Sacramento State ‍‍‍	2	–	3	–	3	.438	4	–	9	–	5	.361
Idaho State ‍‍‍	2	–	4	–	2	.375	4	–	13	–	2	.263
Weber State ‍‍‍	1	–	3	–	4	.375	1	–	9	–	5	.233
Northern Colorado ‍‍‍	1	–	4	–	3	.313	1	–	13	–	4	.167
Eastern Washington ‍‍‍	1	–	6	–	1	.188	2	–	14	–	1	.147
† – Conference champion ‡ – 2023 Big Sky Tournament champion y – Invited to the NCAA Tournament; As of December 5, 2023; Rankings from United Soccer Coaches Poll; Source: The Big Sky Conference

The 2023 Big Sky Conference women's soccer tournament was the postseason women's soccer tournament for the Big Sky Conference held from November 1 to November 5, 2023. The five-match tournament took place at Lumberjack Stadium, home of the Northern Arizona Lumberjacks. The six-team single-elimination tournament consisted of three rounds based on seeding from regular season conference play. The Northern Arizona Lumberjacks were the defending champions. Northern Arizona was unable to defend their title as they lost to Idaho in the Final. The 2–1 victory gave Idaho their first Big Sky Conference title. This was the first overall title for Idaho, and the first title for head coach Jeremy Clevenger. As tournament champions, Idaho earned the Big Sky's automatic berth into the 2023 NCAA Division I women's soccer tournament.

== Seeding ==
The top six teams in the regular season earned a spot in the tournament. No tiebreakers were required as each team finished with a unique regular season conference record.

Seed	School	Conference Record	Points
1	Montana	7–0–1	22
2	Idaho	5–2–1	16
3	Portland State	4–2–2	14
4	Northern Arizona	4–3–1	13
5	Sacramento State	2–3–3	9
6	Idaho State	2–4–2	8

== Bracket ==
First round Wednesday, Nov. 1
4	Northern Arizona	3
5	Sacramento State	0
3	Portland State	4
6	Idaho State	1

Semifinals; Friday, Nov. 3
1	Montana	0
4	Northern Arizona	1
2	Idaho	1
3	Portland State	0

Final; Sunday, Nov. 5
4	Northern Arizona	0
2	Idaho	1

== Schedule ==
=== First Round ===
November 1	#3 Portland State	4–1	#6 Idaho State	Flagstaff, AZ
3:00 p.m. MST	Abi Hoffman 67', (yellow card) 73'; CeCe Jenkins 71'; Lacy Quinn 75'; Sienna Higinbotham 79'; Elle Frazier (yellow card) 88'	Report	30' Kaylyn Buchanan	Stadium: Lumberjack Stadium; Attendance: 70; Referee: Veronica Burr; Assistant referees: Shakir Ballantyne; Juan Nevarez; Fourth official: Mersha Kiseil

November 1	#4 Northern Arizona	3–0	#5 Sacramento State	Flagstaff, AZ
6:00 p.m. MST	Oliva Bos (yellow card) 6'; Josie Novak 56' (pen.); Holly Hunter 65', 85'	Report	(yellow card) 67' Cassandra Herrman	Stadium: Lumberjack Stadium; Attendance: 437; Referee: Joe Pickens; Assistant referees: Mersha Kisiel; Mario Coss; Fourth official: Shakir Ballantyne

=== Semifinals ===
November 3	#2 Idaho	1–0	#3 Portland State	Flagstaff, AZ
3:00 p.m. MST	Hannah Alfaro 54' (pen.)	Report		Stadium: Lumberjack Stadium; Attendance: 95; Referee: Robi Hullner; Assistant referees: Hao Guo; Mauro Cruz; Fourth official: Charles Farr

November 3	#1 Montana	0–1	#4 Northern Arizona	Flagstaff, AZ
6:00 p.m. MST	Maddie Ditta (yellow card) 74'; Abby Gearhart (yellow card) 83'	Report	22' Allison Veloz; (yellow card) 89' Maddie Shafer	Stadium: Lumberjack Stadium; Attendance: 989; Referee: Megan McCain; Assistant referees: Jordan Schultz; Charles Farr; Fourth official: Hao Guo

=== Final ===
November 5	#2 Idaho	2–1	#4 Northern Arizona	Flagstaff, AZ
1:00 p.m. MST	Maddy Lasher 28'; Naomi Alvarez 39'	Report	38' Joey Lujan	Stadium: Lumberjack Stadium; Attendance: 1,023; Referee: Karen Abt; Assistant referees: Veronica Burr; Kaelyn Sykora; Fourth official: J.C. Plott

== Statistics ==
=== Goalscorers ===
There were 13 goals scored in 5 matches, for an average of 2.6 goals per match (as of November 5, 2023).

2 goals

- Holly Hunter – Northern Arizona

1 goal

- Hannah Alfaro – Idaho
- Naomi Alvarez – Idaho
- Maddy Lasher – Idaho
- Kaylyn Buchanan – Idaho State
- Joey Lujan – Northern Arizona
- Josie Novak – Northern Arizona
- Allison Veloz – Northern Arizona
- Sienna Higinbotham – Portland State
- Abi Hoffman – Portland State
- CeCe Jenkins – Portland State
- Lacy Quinn – Portland State

== All Tournament Team ==
Player	Team
Hannah Alfaro	Idaho
Naomi Alvarez	Idaho
Maddy Lasher	Idaho
Alyssa Peters	Idaho
**Rebekah Reyes**	Idaho
Jayd Sprague	Idaho
Kira Witte	Idaho
Holly Hunter	Northern Arizona
Allie Larsen	Northern Arizona
Joey Lujan	Northern Arizona
Allison Veloz	Northern Arizona
Sienna Higinbotham	Portland State

MVP in bold
