= 2025 Big Sky Conference women's soccer tournament =

- Classification: Division I
- Teams: 6
- Matches: 5
- Site: South Campus Stadium, Missoula
- Champions: Montana (8th title)
- Winning coach: Chris Citowicki (4th title)
- MVP: Ashlyn Dvorak (Montana)
- Broadcast: ESPN+

2025 Big Sky Conference women's soccer standings
	Conf.						Overall
Team	W		L		T	PCT	W		L		T	PCT
Montana ‍†‍‡‍^{y}	5	–	1	–	2	.750	11	–	4	–	5	.675
Weber St. ‍‍‍	5	–	2	–	1	.688	12	–	6	–	2	.650
Eastern Washington ‍‍‍	4	–	3	–	1	.563	8	–	7	–	4	.526
Portland St. ‍‍‍	3	–	3	–	2	.500	4	–	9	–	4	.353
Idaho ‍‍‍	2	–	2	–	4	.500	6	–	5	–	9	.525
Northern Arizona ‍‍‍	2	–	3	–	3	.438	6	–	6	–	7	.500
Idaho St. ‍‍‍	2	–	4	–	2	.375	5	–	8	–	4	.412
Northern Colorado ‍‍‍	2	–	4	–	2	.375	3	–	10	–	6	.316
Sacramento St. ‍‍‍	2	–	5	–	1	.313	6	–	11	–	1	.361
† – Conference champion ‡ – 2025 Big Sky Tournament champion y – Invited to the NCAA Tournament; As of December 9, 2025; Rankings from United Soccer Coaches Poll; Source:The Big Sky Conference

The 2025 Big Sky Conference women's soccer tournament was the postseason women's soccer tournament for the Big Sky Conference that was held from November 5 to 9, 2025. The five-match tournament took place at the South Campus Stadium in Missoula, the home ground of regular season champions Montana. The six-team single-elimination tournament consisted of three rounds based on seeding from regular season conference play. Sacramento State were the defending champions. However, Sacramento State failed to defend their title, as they finished last in the regular season standings and failed to qualify for the tournament. The tournament was won by Montana, who defeated Weber State 4−2 on penalties in the final. It was the eighth title for Montana and the fourth title for head coach Chris Citowicki since his appointment in 2018.

As tournament champions, Montana earned the Big Sky's automatic berth into the 2025 NCAA Division I women's soccer tournament.

== Seeding ==
The top six teams in the regular season earned a spot in the tournament. Teams were seeded based on regular season conference records, with the first and second seeds receiving a bye into the semifinals. No tiebreakers were required as the top six teams in the conference all finished with unique conference records.

Seed	School	Conference Record	Points
1	Montana	5–1–2	17
2	Weber State	5–2–1	16
3	Eastern Washington	4–3–1	13
4	Portland State	3–3–2	11
5	Idaho	2–2–4	10
6	Northern Arizona	2–3–3	9

== Bracket ==
Quarterfinals; Wednesday, Nov. 5
3	Eastern Washington	1
6	Northern Arizona	2
4	Portland State	0
5	Idaho	1

Semifinals; Friday, Nov. 7
2	Weber State	2
6	Northern Arizona	1
1	Montana (pen.)	2 (3)
5	Idaho	2 (1)

Final; Sunday, Nov. 9
2	Weber State	0 (2)
1	Montana (pen.)	0 (4)

== Schedule ==
=== Quarterfinals ===
November 5, 2025	#3 Eastern Washington	1–2	#6 Northern Arizona	Missoula, MT
11:00 MST	Audrey Schlotfeldt 5'	Report	Valerie Llamas 8'; Avery Ott 20', (yellow card) 76'; Micala Boex (yellow card) 52'	Stadium: South Campus Stadium; Attendance: 107; Referee: Nathan Max; Assistant referees: Aidan Atkins; Brett Danielson; Fourth official: Jill Donahue

November 5, 2025	#4 Portland State	0–1	#5 Idaho	Missoula, MT
14:00 MST		Report	Kahvayli Miller (yellow card) 64'; Naomi Alvarez 78'	Stadium: South Campus Stadium; Attendance: 93; Referee: Veronica Burr; Assistant referees: Fernando Varini; Joe Walters; Fourth official: Aidan Atkins

=== Semifinals ===
November 7, 2025	#2 Weber State	2–1	#6 Northern Arizona	Missoula, MT
11:00 MST	Presley Ray 57'; Brynlee Meyerhoffer 69'	Report	Micala Boex 8'; Karli Burton (yellow card) 55'; Madisyn Marchesi (yellow card) 90'	Stadium: South Campus Stadium; Attendance: 124; Referee: Brad Church; Assistant referees: Josh Madison; Darya Fedchanka; Fourth official: Cole Johnson

November 7, 2025	#1 Montana	2–2 (a.e.t.) (3–1 p)	#5 Idaho	Missoula, MT
14:00 MST	Eliza Bentler 24'; Reagan Brisendine 53'; Mia Parkhurst (yellow card) 104'	Report	Sara Rodgers 9', 90'; Naomi Alvarez (yellow card) 37'	Stadium: South Campus Stadium; Attendance: 978; Referee: Chris Turner; Assistant referees: Matthew Suhr; Cole Johnson; Fourth official: Josh Madison
	Penalties
	Lydia Robertson (penalty missed); Reagan Brisendine (penalty scored); Maddie Ditta (penalty scored); Eliza Bentler (penalty scored)		(penalty missed) Mia Boltz; (penalty missed) Makenna Stuart; (penalty scored) Kahvayli Miller; (penalty missed) Annika Farley

=== Final ===
November 9, 2025	#2 Weber State	0–0 (a.e.t.) (2–4 p)	#1 Montana	Missoula, MT
13:00 MST	Tenzi Knowles (yellow card) 109'	Report	Maddie Ditta (yellow card) 109'	Stadium: South Campus Stadium; Attendance: 2,227; Referee: Serghei Celan; Assistant referees: Alex Rice; Jill Donahue; Fourth official: Kaitlyn Willis
	Penalties
	Brynlee Meyerhoffer (penalty missed); Simone Packer (penalty scored); Grace Kirby (penalty scored); Harlee Thomas (penalty missed)		(penalty scored) Ashlyn Dvorak; (penalty scored) Chloe Seelhoff; (penalty scored) Caylee Kerr; (penalty scored) Maycen Slater

== Statistics ==
=== Goalscorers ===
There were 11 goals scored in 5 matches, for an average of 2.2 goals per match (as of November 9, 2025).

2 goals

- Sara Rodgers – Idaho

1 goal

- Naomi Alvarez – Idaho
- Eliza Bentler – Montana
- Micala Boex – Northern Arizona
- Reagan Brisendine – Montana
- Valerie Llamas – Northern Arizona
- Brynlee Meyerhoffer – Weber State
- Avery Ott – Northern Arizona
- Presley Ray – Weber State
- Audrey Schlotfeldt – Eastern Washington

== All Tournament Team ==
Player	Team
Sara Rodgers	Idaho
Avery Ott	Northern Arizona
Eliza Bentler	Montana
Reagan Brisendine	Montana
Riley Carolan	Montana
Maddie Ditta	Montana
**Ashlyn Dvorak**	Montana
Maycen Slater	Montana
Makena Smith	Montana
Lauren Butorac	Weber State
Brynlee Meyerhoffer	Weber State

MVP in bold
