= 2021 Big Sky Conference women's soccer tournament =

- Classification: Division I
- Teams: 6
- Matches: 5
- Attendance: 1,103
- Site: Jackson Stadium; Greeley, Colorado
- Champions: Montana (7th title)
- Winning coach: Chris Citowicki (3rd title)
- MVP: Camilla Xu (Montana)
- Broadcast: ESPN+

2021 Big Sky Conference women's soccer standings
	Conf.						Overall
Team	W		L		T	PCT	W		L		T	PCT
Northern Colorado ‍†‍‍	8	–	1	–	0	.889	10	–	8	–	2	.550
Montana ‍‍‡‍^{y}	7	–	1	–	1	.833	13	–	5	–	1	.711
Weber State ‍‍‍	6	–	3	–	0	.667	11	–	9	–	0	.550
Northern Arizona ‍‍‍	6	–	3	–	0	.667	8	–	11	–	0	.421
Idaho ‍‍‍	4	–	4	–	1	.500	10	–	5	–	2	.647
Sacramento State ‍‍‍	3	–	6	–	0	.333	5	–	11	–	2	.333
Eastern Washington ‍‍‍	3	–	6	–	0	.333	5	–	12	–	0	.294
Portland State ‍‍‍	2	–	5	–	2	.333	4	–	10	–	2	.313
Idaho State ‍‍‍	2	–	7	–	0	.222	2	–	16	–	1	.132
Southern Utah ‍‍‍	1	–	6	–	2	.222	2	–	13	–	2	.176
† – Conference champion ‡ – 2021 Big Sky Tournament champion y – Invited to the NCAA Tournament; As of December 7, 2021; Rankings from United Soccer Coaches Poll; Source:The Big Sky Conference

The 2021 Big Sky Conference women's soccer tournament was the postseason women's soccer tournament for the Big Sky Conference held from November 3 to November 7, 2021. The five-match tournament took place at Jackson Stadium, home of the regular-season champions Northern Colorado. The six-team single-elimination tournament consisted of three rounds based on seeding from regular season conference play. The Montana Grizzlies were the defending champions and successfully defended their title by defeating Weber State in the Finals. This was the sixth overall title for Montana, and the third title for coach Chris Citowicki. Montana and coach Citowicki have won three of the last four Big Sky Conference Tournaments. As tournament champions, Montana earned the Big Sky's automatic berth into the 2021 NCAA Division I Women's Soccer Tournament.

== Seeding ==
The top six teams in the regular season earned a spot in the tournament. Northern Arizona and Weber State finished tied for third, with both teams having a 6–3–0 conference record, but Northern Arizona secured the third seed in the tournament by virtue of defeating Weber State 4–1 on October 8. Sacramento State and Eastern Washington finished tied for sixth place, with both teams having a 3–6–0 conference record. Sacramento State won the tiebreaker and qualified for the tournament based on their 4–2 victory over Eastern Washington on October 10.

Seed	School	Conference Record	Points
1	Northern Colorado	8–1–0	24
2	Montana	7–1–1	22
3	Northern Arizona	6–3–0	18
4	Weber State	6–3–0	18
5	Idaho	4–4–1	13
6	Sacramento State	3–6–0	9

== Bracket ==
First round Wednesday, Nov. 3
4	Weber State	3
5	Idaho	0
3	Northern Arizona	0
6	Sacramento State	1

Semifinals; Friday, Nov. 5
1	Northern Colorado	2
4	Weber State	3
2	Montana	1
6	Sacramento State	0

Final; Sunday, Nov. 7
4	Weber State	0
2	Montana	1

== Schedule ==
=== First Round ===
November 3, 2021	#3 Northern Arizona	0–1	#6 Sacramento State	Greeley, CO
11:00 a.m. MT	Josie Novak (yellow card) 36'; Sam Larberg (yellow card) 73'	Report	84' Tiffany Miras	Stadium: Jackson Stadium; Attendance: 107; Referee: William Knause; Assistant referees: Brian Yip; Santiago Ramirez; Fourth official: Max Alatorre

November 3, 2021	#4 Weber State	3–0	#5 Idaho	Greeley, CO
2:00 p.m. MT	Lily Webster 8'; Rachel Twede 71'; Sadie Newsom 88' (pen.)	Report		Stadium: Jackson Stadium; Attendance: 58; Referee: Karen Abt; Assistant referees: Max Alatorre; Seth Edick; Fourth official: Brian Yip

=== Semifinals ===
November 5, 2021	#2 Montana	1–0	#6 Sacramento State	Greeley, CO
11:00 a.m. MT	McKenzie Kilpatrick (yellow card) 70'; Charley Boone 87'	Report		Stadium: Jackson Stadium; Attendance: 66; Referee: Andrea Jones; Assistant referees: Tomas Habtemicael; Jason Hampton; Fourth official: Jeff Arthurholtz

November 5, 2021	#1 Northern Colorado	2–3	#4 Weber State	Greeley, CO
2:00 p.m. MT	55', 59' Taylor Bray	Report	46' Yira Yoggerst; (yellow card) 55' Rachel Twede; 60' Taylor Slack; 66' Morgan Furmaniak	Stadium: Jackson Stadium; Attendance: 340; Referee: Jeff Arthurholtz; Assistant referees: Jacob Herold; William Knause; Fourth official: Kathie Krempels

=== Final ===
November 7, 2021	#2 Montana	1–0	#4 Weber State	Greeley, CO
12:00 p.m. MT	Jaden Griggs 36'; Sydney Haustein (yellow card) 53'	Report		Stadium: Jackson Stadium; Attendance: 532; Referee: Max Alatorre; Assistant referees: Lauren Parliament; Andrea Jones; Fourth official: Ryan Wilde

== Statistics ==
=== Goalscorers ===
There were 11 goals scored in 5 matches, for an average of 2.2 goals per match (as of November 7, 2021).

2 goals

- Taylor Bray – Northern Colorado

1 goal

- Charley Boone – Montana
- Jaden Griggs – Montana
- Tiffany Miras – Sacramento State
- Morgan Furmaniak – Weber State
- Saide Newsom – Weber State
- Taylor Slack – Weber State
- Rachel Twede – Weber State
- Lily Webster – Weber State
- Yira Yoggerst – Weber State

== All Tournament Team ==
Player	Team
**Camellia Xu**	Montana
Charley Boone	Montana
Taylor Stoeger	Montana
Taylor Hansen	Montana
Caitlin Rogers	Montana
Allie Larsen	Montana
Yira Yoggerst	Weber State
Taylor Slack	Weber State
Morgan Furmaniak	Weber State
Sadie Newsom	Weber State
Tiffany Miras	Sacramento State
Taylor Bray	Northern Colorado

MVP in bold
