= 2024 Big Sky Conference women's soccer tournament =

American college soccer tournament

- Classification: Division I
- Teams: 6
- Matches: 5
- Attendance: 1,849
- Site: South Campus Stadium; Missoula, Montana
- Champions: Sacramento State (3rd title)
- Winning coach: Randy Dedini (3rd title)
- MVP: Sierra Sonko (Sacramento State)
- Broadcast: ESPN+

2024 Big Sky Conference women's soccer standings
	Conf.						Overall
Team	W		L		T	PCT	W		L		T	PCT
Montana ‍†‍‍	6	–	0	–	2	.875	12	–	2	–	5	.763
Idaho ‍‍‍	5	–	2	–	1	.688	12	–	5	–	3	.675
Eastern Washington ‍‍‍	4	–	1	–	3	.688	9	–	5	–	5	.605
Northern Arizona ‍‍‍	4	–	3	–	1	.563	4	–	7	–	6	.412
Sacramento St. ‍‍‡‍^{y}	3	–	2	–	3	.563	5	–	7	–	9	.452
Portland St. ‍‍‍	2	–	3	–	3	.438	4	–	9	–	5	.361
Northern Colorado ‍‍‍	2	–	5	–	1	.313	4	–	14	–	1	.237
Weber St. ‍‍‍	1	–	6	–	1	.188	2	–	13	–	5	.225
Idaho St. ‍‍‍	1	–	6	–	1	.188	2	–	10	–	5	.265
† – Conference champion ‡ – 2024 Big Sky Tournament champion y – Invited to the NCAA Tournament; As of December 10, 2024; Rankings from United Soccer Coaches Poll; Source:The Big Sky Conference

The 2024 Big Sky Conference women's soccer tournament was the postseason women's soccer tournament for the Big Sky Conference held from November 6 to November 10, 2024. The five-match tournament took place at South Campus Stadium, home of the regular season champions Montana Grizzlies. The six-team single-elimination tournament consisted of three rounds based on seeding from regular season conference play. The Idaho were the defending champions. Idaho was unable to defend their title as they lost to Sacramento State, in a penalty shoot-out in the Final. This was the third overall title for Sacramento State, all of which have come under head coach Randy Dedini. As tournament champions, Sacramento State earned the Big Sky's automatic berth into the 2024 NCAA Division I women's soccer tournament.

== Seeding ==
The top six teams in the regular season earned a spot in the tournament. Teams were seeded based on regular season conference records, and the first and second seeds earned a bye into the Semifinals. No tiebreakers were required as the top seven teams in the conference all finished with unique conference records.

Seed	School	Conference Record	Points
1	Montana	6–0–2	20
2	Idaho	5–2–1	16
3	Eastern Washington	4–1–3	15
4	Northern Arizona	4–3–1	13
5	Sacramento State	3–2–3	12
6	Portland State	2–3–3	9

== Bracket ==
First round Wednesday, Nov. 6
4	Northern Arizona	2 (3)
5	Sacramento State (pen.)	2 (4)
3	Eastern Washington	1 (6)
6	Portland State (pen.)	1 (7)

Semifinals; Friday, Nov. 8
1	Montana	0 (4)
5	Sacramento State (pen.)	0 (4)
2	Idaho	2
6	Portland State	1

Final; Sunday, Nov. 10
5	Sacramento State (pen.)	0 (7)
2	Idaho	0 (6)

== Schedule ==
=== First Round ===
November 6, 2024	#3 Eastern Washington	1–1 (a.e.t.) (6–7 p)	#6 Portland State	Missoula, MT
11:00 a.m. MST	Grace Terrill 30'	Report	(yellow card) 41' Lucy Quinn; 74' Aliayha Saldana; (yellow card) 100' Kalo Iongi	Stadium: South Campus Stadium; Attendance: 152; Referee: Chris Turner; Assistant referees: Cole Johnson; Matthew Suhr; Fourth official: Brian Lambrecht
	Penalties
	Kendall Moore (penalty scored); Delani Walker (penalty scored); Ryanne Ampi (penalty scored); Isabelle Herting (penalty scored); Chloe Pattison (penalty scored); Riley Arribas (penalty scored); Elisabeth Cole (penalty missed)		(penalty scored) Abi Hoffman; (penalty scored) Elle Frazier; (penalty scored) Liv Frazier; (penalty scored) Rachel Farr; (penalty scored) Natalie Cunningham; (penalty scored) Ocean Rideout; (penalty scored) Megan Devall

November 6, 2024	#4 Northern Arizona	2–2 (a.e.t.) (3–4 p)	#5 Sacramento State	Missoula, MT
2:00 p.m. MST	Kayla Shebar 32'; Micala Boex 68' (pen.)	Report	44' Lexi Schroeder; 52' Teysha-Rey Spinney-Kuahuia	Stadium: South Campus Stadium; Attendance: 134; Referee: Rachel Swett; Assistant referees: Brian Lambrecht; Marcos Maldonado; Fourth official: Cole Johnson
	Penalties
	Fallon Anderson (penalty scored); Joey Lujan (penalty scored); McKenzie Coleman (penalty missed); Deniah Wells (penalty scored); Micala Boex (penalty missed)		(penalty scored) Abigail Lopez; (penalty scored) Madelyn Dougherty; (penalty missed) Lexi Schroeder; (penalty scored) Ariana Scholten; (penalty scored) Sydney Sharts

=== Semifinals ===
November 8, 2024	#2 Idaho	2–1	#6 Portland State	Missoula, MT
11:00 a.m. MST	Jadyn Hanks 73'; Sara Rodgers 78'	Report	(yellow card) 9' Lucy Quinn; 51' Abi Hoffman; (yellow card) 82' Kalo Iongi	Stadium: South Campus Stadium; Attendance: 179; Referee: Elorm Atisu; Assistant referees: Aidan Atkins; Darya Fedchanka; Fourth official: Devin Harbour

November 8, 2024	#1 Montana	0–0 (a.e.t.) (3–4 p)	#5 Sacramento State	Missoula, MT
2:00 p.m. MST		Report	(yellow card) 60' Jaety Mandaquit	Stadium: South Campus Stadium; Attendance: 1,122; Referee: Oscar Guillen; Assistant referees: Serghei Celan; Chris LaRoche; Fourth official: Jill Donahue
	Penalties
	Maddie Ditta (penalty scored); Charley Boone (penalty scored); Bella O'Brien (penalty missed); Hayley Bass (penalty missed); Chloe Seelhoff (penalty scored)		(penalty scored) Abigail Lopez; (penalty missed) Madelyn Dougherty; (penalty scored) Erika Tilford; (penalty scored) Ariana Scholten; (penalty scored) Sydney Sharts

=== Final ===
November 10, 2024	#2 Idaho	0–0 (a.e.t.) (6–7 p)	#5 Sacramento State	Missoula, MT
1:00 p.m. MST	Rebekah Reyes (yellow card) 81'; Kylie Hummel (yellow card) 110'	Report	(yellow card) 29' Teysha-Rey Spinney-Kuahuia; (yellow card) 73' Cassandra Herrman; (yellow card) 99' Sydney Sharts	Stadium: South Campus Stadium; Attendance: 262; Referee: Josh Madison; Assistant referees: Carl Rice; Kevin Au; Fourth official: Elorm Atisu
	Penalties
	Hannah Alfaro (penalty scored); Kylie Hummel (penalty scored); Kahvayli Miller (penalty scored); Sara Rodgers (penalty missed); Annika Farley (penalty scored); Karli Yoshida-Williams (penalty scored); Alyssa Peters (penalty scored); Margo Schoesler (penalty missed)		(penalty scored) Abigail Lopez; (penalty scored) Madelyn Dougherty; (penalty missed) Erika Tilford; (penalty scored) Ariana Scholten; (penalty scored) Sydney Sharts; (penalty scored) Cassandra Herrman; (penalty scored) Lexi Schroeder; (penalty scored) Ellie Farber

== Statistics ==
=== Goalscorers ===
There were 9 goals scored in 5 matches, for an average of 1.8 goals per match (as of November 10, 2024).

1 goal

- Micala Boex – Northern Arizona
- Jadyn Hanks – Idaho
- Abi Hoffman – Portland State
- Sara Rodgers – Idaho
- Aliayha Saldana – Portland State
- Lexi Schroeder – Sacramento State
- Kayla Shebar – Northern Arizona
- Teysha-Rey Spinney-Kuahuia – Sacramento State
- Grace Terrill – Eastern Washington

== All Tournament Team ==
Player	Team
Paula Flores	Idaho
Jadyn Hanks	Idaho
Alyssa Peters	Idaho
Sara Rodgers	Idaho
Ava Samuelson	Montana
Abi Hoffman	Portland State
Ellie Farber	Sacramento State
Dalen Lau	Sacramento State
Izzy Palmatier	Sacramento State
Sydney Sharts	Sacramento State
**Sierra Sonko**	Sacramento State
Teysha-Rey Spinney-Kuahuia	Sacramento State

MVP in bold
