= 2022 Big Sky Conference women's soccer tournament =

- Classification: Division I
- Teams: 6
- Matches: 5
- Attendance: 886
- Site: Jackson Stadium; Greeley, Colorado
- Champions: Northern Arizona (4th title)
- Winning coach: Alan Berrios (1st title)
- MVP: Trinity Corcoran (Northern Arizona)
- Broadcast: ESPN+

2022 Big Sky Conference women's soccer standings
	Conf.						Overall
Team	W		L		T	PCT	W		L		T	PCT
Northern Arizona ‍†‍‡‍^{y}	7	–	1	–	0	.875	8	–	6	–	6	.550
Idaho ‍‍‍	6	–	2	–	0	.750	12	–	3	–	3	.750
Portland St. ‍‍‍	4	–	2	–	2	.625	5	–	8	–	5	.417
Sacramento St. ‍‍‍	4	–	3	–	1	.563	4	–	9	–	5	.361
Weber St. ‍‍‍	4	–	4	–	0	.500	5	–	11	–	2	.333
Montana ‍‍‍	3	–	4	–	1	.438	7	–	7	–	6	.500
Eastern Washington ‍‍‍	2	–	3	–	3	.438	5	–	8	–	5	.417
Idaho St. ‍‍‍	2	–	6	–	0	.250	3	–	11	–	2	.250
Northern Colorado ‍‍‍	0	–	7	–	1	.063	4	–	11	–	3	.306
† – Conference champion ‡ – 2022 Big Sky Tournament champion y – Invited to the NCAA Tournament; As of December 6, 2022; Rankings from United Soccer Coaches Poll; Source:The Big Sky Conference

The 2022 Big Sky Conference women's soccer tournament was the postseason women's soccer tournament for the Big Sky Conference held from November 2 to November 6, 2022. The five-match tournament took place at Jackson Stadium, home of the Northern Colorado Bears. The six-team single-elimination tournament consisted of three rounds based on seeding from regular season conference play. The Montana Grizzlies were the defending champions. Montana was unable to defend their title as they lost to Idaho in the Semifinals. Northern Arizona won their first title since 2014 by defeating Idaho in the final on penalties 4–3 after the game finished tied 0–0. This was the fourth overall title for Montana, and the first title for head coach Alan Berrios. As tournament champions, Northern Arizona earned the Big Sky's automatic berth into the 2022 NCAA Division I women's soccer tournament.

== Seeding ==
The top six teams in the regular season earned a spot in the tournament. No tiebreakers were required as each team finished with a unique regular season conference record.

Seed	School	Conference Record	Points
1	Northern Arizona	7–1–0	21
2	Idaho	6–2–0	18
3	Portland State	4–2–2	14
4	Sacramento State	4–3–1	13
5	Weber State	4–4–0	12
6	Montana	3–4–1	10

== Bracket ==
First round Wednesday, Nov. 2
4	Sacramento State	1 (2)
5	Weber State (pen.)	1 (4)
3	Portland State	0
6	Montana	3

Semifinals; Friday, Nov. 4
1	Northern Arizona (pen.)	1 (4)
5	Weber State	1 (2)
2	Idaho (a.e.t.)	1
6	Montana	0

Final; Sunday, Nov. 6
1	Northern Arizona (pen.)	0 (4)
2	Idaho	0 (3)

== Schedule ==
=== First Round ===
November 2	#3 Portland State	0–3	#6 Montana	Greeley, CO
11:00 a.m. MT	Lucy Quinn (yellow card) 38'	Report	29' Sydney Haustein; 44' Molly Massman; 47' Maysa Walters; (yellow card) 63' Riley O'Brien	Stadium: Jackson Stadium; Attendance: 307; Referee: Bradley Miller; Assistant referees: Lauren Parliament; Sara Renyer; Fourth official: Kastriot Baruni

November 2	#4 Sacramento State	1–1 (a.e.t.) (2–4 p)	#5 Weber State	Greeley, CO
2:00 p.m. MT	Jordan Goularte 43'; Abigail Lopez (yellow card) 81'	Report	(yellow card) 28', (goal) 68' Andelin Binford	Stadium: Jackson Stadium; Attendance: 127; Referee: Kastriot Baruni; Assistant referees: Bol Abiar; William Knause; Fourth official: Kathie Krempels
	Penalties
	Aubrey Goodwill (penalty missed); Ariana Nino (penalty missed); Jordan Goularte (penalty scored); Lexi Rakela (penalty scored)		(penalty missed) Yira Yoggerst; (penalty scored) Morgan Furmaniak; (penalty scored) Alexis Simpson; (penalty scored) Brynlee Meyerhoffer; (penalty scored) Rylee Tatton

=== Semifinals ===
November 4	#2 Idaho	1–0 (a.e.t.)	#6 Montana	Greeley, CO
11:00 a.m. MT	Jayd Sprague (yellow card) 83'; Margo Schoesler 100'	Report		Stadium: Jackson Stadium; Attendance: 103; Referee: Megan McCain; Assistant referees: Patricia McCracken; Harlan Grossman; Fourth official: Jae Lehman

November 4	#1 Northern Arizona	1–1 (a.e.t.) (4–2 p)	#5 Weber State	Greeley, CO
2:00 p.m. MT	Josie Novak 46'	Report	(yellow card) 53' Ali Swenson; (yellow card) 62' Shea Christiansen; 82' Yira Yoggerst	Stadium: Jackson Stadium; Attendance: 179; Referee: Laura Rodriguez; Assistant referees: Jae Lehman; Jacob Herold; Fourth official: Harlan Grossman
	Penalties
	Mikhail Johnson (penalty scored); Maddie Shafer (penalty scored); Jaylin Borden (penalty scored); Rylie Curran (penalty scored)		(penalty scored) Morgan Furmaniak; (penalty missed) Alexis Simpson; (penalty scored) Brynleee Meyerhoffer; (penalty missed) Rachel Twede

=== Final ===
November 6	#1 Northern Arizona	0–0 (a.e.t.) (4–3 p)	#2 Idaho	Greeley, CO
12:00 p.m. MT		Report	(yellow card) 53' Team	Stadium: Jackson Stadium; Attendance: 170; Referee: Kristin Patterson; Assistant referees: Andrea Jones; Kayla Caballero; Fourth official: Jae Lehman
	Penalties
	Abby Donathan (penalty scored); Maddie Shafer (penalty scored); Mikhail Johnson (penalty scored); Jaylin Borden (penalty missed); Rylie Curran (penalty scored)		(penalty missed) Margo Schoesler; (penalty scored) Annika Farley; (penalty scored) Makenzie Burks; (penalty scored) Ariel Lofton; (penalty missed) Sara Evans

== Statistics ==
=== Goalscorers ===
There were 8 goals scored in 5 matches, for an average of 1.6 goals per match (as of November 6, 2022).

1 goal

- Margo Schoesler – Idaho
- Sydney Haustein – Montana
- Molly Massman – Montana
- Maysa Walters – Montana
- Josie Novak – Northern Arizona
- Jordan Goularte – Sacramento State
- Andelin Binford – Weber State
- Yira Yoggerst – Weber State

== All Tournament Team ==
Player	Team
**Trinity Corcoran**	Northern Arizona
Rylie Curran	Northern Arizona
Abby Donathan	Northern Arizona
Maddie Shafer	Northern Arizona
Mikhail Johnson	Northern Arizona
Josie Novak	Northern Arizona
Kira Witte	Idaho
Cassidy Elicker	Idaho
Margo Schoesler	Idaho
Jayd Sprague	Idaho
Allie Larsen	Montana
Yira Yoggerst	Weber State

MVP in bold
