= 2018 Big Sky Conference women's soccer tournament =

- Classification: Division I
- Teams: 6
- Matches: 5
- Attendance: 1,175
- Site: Wildcat Soccer Field; Ogden, Utah
- Champions: Montana (5th title)
- Winning coach: Chris Citowicki (1st title)
- MVP: Janessa Fowler (Montana)
- Broadcast: None

2018 Big Sky Conference women's soccer standings
	Conf.						Overall
Team	W		L		T	PCT	W		L		T	PCT
Weber St. ‍†‍‍	7	–	1	–	1	.833	9	–	5	–	4	.611
Idaho ‍‍‍	6	–	1	–	2	.778	9	–	7	–	3	.553
Northern Colorado ‍‍‍	6	–	2	–	1	.722	12	–	8	–	1	.595
Northern Arizona ‍‍‍	5	–	1	–	3	.722	9	–	5	–	4	.611
Montana ‍‍‡‍^{y}	3	–	2	–	4	.556	7	–	9	–	6	.455
Eastern Washington ‍‍‍	4	–	4	–	1	.500	8	–	8	–	3	.500
Portland St. ‍‍‍	3	–	5	–	1	.389	5	–	10	–	1	.344
Sac State ‍‍‍	2	–	7	–	0	.222	3	–	13	–	2	.222
Southern Utah ‍‍‍	1	–	7	–	1	.167	2	–	15	–	1	.139
Idaho St. ‍‍‍	1	–	8	–	0	.111	2	–	14	–	0	.125
† – Conference champion ‡ – 2018 Big Sky Tournament champion y – Invited to the NCAA Tournament; As of November 13, 2018; Rankings from United Soccer Coaches Poll; Source:The Big Sky Conference

The 2018 Big Sky Conference women's soccer tournament was the postseason women's soccer tournament for the Big Sky Conference held from October 31 to November 4, 2018. The five-match tournament took place at Wildcat Soccer Field, home of the regular-season champions Weber State Wildcats. The six-team single-elimination tournament consisted of three rounds based on seeding from regular season conference play. The Eastern Washington Eagles were the defending champions and did not successfully defend their title, losing to the Northern Colorado Bears in the quarterfinals. The fifth seeded Montana Grizzlies upset three teams along their way to a championship, beating Northern Colorado 1–0 in the final.

== Bracket ==
First round Wednesday, Oct. 31
3	Northern Colorado	3
6	Eastern Washington	1
4	Northern Arizona	0
5	Montana	1

Semifinals; Friday, Nov. 2
2	Idaho	0
3	Northern Colorado	3
1	Weber St.	0
5	Montana	2

Final; Sunday, Nov. 4
3	Northern Colorado	0
5	Montana	1

== Schedule ==
=== First Round ===
October 31, 2018	#3 Northern Colorado	3–1	#6 Eastern Washington	Ogden, Utah
12:05 p.m.	Cara Quinn 27'; Mariel Gutierrez 46', 75'	Report	Jenny Chavez 8'; Devan Talley (yellow card) 53' (yellow-red card) 77'	Stadium: Wildcat Soccer Field; Attendance: 269; Referee: Jason Hutchinson; Assistant referees: Kristi Mak; Adam Sanchez; Fourth official: Alan Jimenez

October 31, 2018	#4 Northern Arizona	0–1	#5 Montana	Ogden, Utah
3:05 p.m.		Report	Janessa Fowler 54'	Stadium: Wildcat Soccer Field; Referee: Brad James; Assistant referees: TJ Zarlock; Alan Jiminez; Fourth official: Kristi Mak

=== Semifinals ===
November 2, 2018	#2 Idaho	0–3	#3 Northern Colorado	Ogden, Utah
12:05 p.m.	Taylor Brust (yellow card) 62'; Team (yellow card) 85'	Report	Maddie Roberts 22'; Taylor Bray 22', 58'	Stadium: Wildcat Soccer Field; Attendance: 256; Referee: Mario Cross; Assistant referees: Sly Yeates; David Rozek; Fourth official: Micheal Anglin

November 2, 2018	#1 Weber St.	0–2	#5 Montana	Ogden, Utah
3:05 p.m.	Shailyn Jenkins (yellow card) 42'; Madison Carter (yellow card) 71'; Morgan Quarnberg (yellow card) 76'	Report	Alexa Coyle 8'; Janessa Fowler 31' (yellow card) 42'	Stadium: Wildcat Soccer Field; Attendance: 412; Referee: Megan McCain; Assistant referees: Dani Spicer-Escalnat; Micheal Anglin; Fourth official: Sly Yeates

=== Final ===
November 4, 2018	#3 Northern Colorado	0–1	#5 Montana	Ogden, Utah
12:05 p.m.		Report	Alexa Coyle 57'	Stadium: Wildcat Soccer Field; Attendance: 238; Referee: Adam Zarrin; Assistant referees: Kali Smith; Karsten Gillwald; Fourth official: Sly Yeates

== Statistics ==
=== Goalscorers ===
2 Goals

- Taylor Bray - Northern Colorado
- Alexa Coyle - Montana
- Janessa Fowler - Montana
- Mariel Gutierrez - Northern Colorado

1 Goal

- Jenny Chavez - Eastern Washington
- Maddie Roberts - Northern Colorado
- Cara Quinn - Northern Colorado

== All Tournament Team ==
Player	Team
Janessa Fowler (MVP)	Montana
Alexa Coyle	Montana
Claire Howard	Montana
Taryn Miller	Montana
Taylor Hansen	Montana
Mariel Gutierrez	Northern Colorado
Maddie Roberts	Northern Colorado
Lindsi Jennings	Northern Colorado
Olivia Glassford	Weber State
Nixie Hernandez	Weber State
Kelly Dopke	Idaho
Brooke Sosa	Idaho
