= 2016 Big Sky Conference women's soccer tournament =

- Classification: Division I
- Teams: 6
- Matches: 5
- Site: EWU Soccer Complex; Cheney, Washington
- Champions: Eastern Washington (1st title)
- Winning coach: Chad Bodnar (1st title)

2016 Big Sky Conference women's soccer standings
	Conf.						Overall
Team	W		L		T	PCT	W		L		T	PCT
Idaho ‍†‍‍	7	–	1	–	2	.800	10	–	5	–	4	.632
Sacramento State ‍‍‍	6	–	2	–	2	.700	8	–	7	–	4	.526
Northern Arizona ‍‍‍	5	–	2	–	3	.650	10	–	7	–	5	.568
Montana ‍‍‍	5	–	2	–	3	.650	9	–	6	–	5	.575
Eastern Washington ‍‍‡‍^{y}	5	–	3	–	2	.600	13	–	5	–	4	.682
Northern Colorado ‍‍‍	5	–	4	–	1	.550	10	–	8	–	2	.550
Portland State ‍‍‍	4	–	5	–	1	.450	6	–	11	–	1	.361
Idaho State ‍‍‍	4	–	6	–	0	.400	7	–	13	–	0	.350
Weber State ‍‍‍	3	–	6	–	1	.350	5	–	10	–	2	.353
Southern Utah ‍‍‍	2	–	7	–	1	.250	3	–	12	–	2	.235
North Dakota ‍‍‍	1	–	9	–	0	.100	2	–	14	–	2	.167
† – Conference champion ‡ – 2016 Big Sky Tournament champion y – Invited to the NCAA tournament As of 2016-11-17; Rankings from NSCAA

The 2016 Big Sky Conference women's soccer tournament is the postseason women's soccer tournament for the Big Sky Conference held from November 2 to 6, 2016. The five match tournament was held at campus sites, with the higher seed hosting. The six team single-elimination tournament consisted of three rounds based on seeding from regular season conference play. The Northern Colorado Bears were the defending tournament champions, after defeating the Idaho Vandals in a penalty kick shootout in the championship match.

== Bracket ==
First round Wednesday, Nov. 2
3	Northern Arizona	2
6	Northern Colorado	1
4	Montana	0
5	Eastern Washington	1

Semifinals; Friday, Nov. 4
2	Sacramento State	2
3	Northern Arizona	3
1	Idaho	0
5	Eastern Washington	1

Final; Sunday, Nov. 6
3	Northern Arizona	1 (3)
5	Eastern Washington	1 (4)

== Schedule ==
=== First Round ===
November 2, 2016	#3 Northern Arizona	2–1	#6 Northern Colorado	Cheney, Washington
1:00 p.m. EST	Adrian Nixt 2'; Anna Goebel 58'	Report	Sydney Schroeder 17'	Stadium: EWU Soccer Complex; Referee: Saeed Askar

November 2, 2016	#4 Montana	0–1	#5 Eastern Washington	Cheney, Washington
4:00 p.m. EST		Report	Chloe Williams 13'	Stadium: EWU Soccer Complex; Referee: Jason Hutchinson

=== Semi-finals ===
November 4, 2016	#2 Sacramento State	2–3	#3 Northern Arizona	Cheney, Washington
1:00 p.m. EST	Regan Smithers 22'; Jennifer Lum 65'	Report	Anna Goebel 40', 66'; Lindsay Doyle 49'	Stadium: EWU Soccer Complex; Referee: Matthew Buckman

November 4, 2016	#1 Idaho	0–1	#5 Eastern Washington	Cheney, Washington
4:00 p.m. EST		Report	Allison Raniere 88'	Stadium: EWU Soccer Complex

=== Final ===
November 6, 2016	#3 Northern Arizona	1–1 (a.e.t.) (3–4 p)	#5 Eastern Washington	Cheney, Washington
3:00 p.m. EST	Ali Lixandru 41'	Report	Jenny Chavez 49'	Stadium: EWU Soccer Complex; Referee: Raymond Moffattee Jr
	Penalties
	Alexis Moest (penalty missed); Adrian Nixt (penalty scored); Lindsay Doyle (penalty scored); Carly Gamble (penalty scored); Ali Lixandru (penalty missed)		(penalty scored) Jenny Chavez; (penalty scored) Chloe Williams; (penalty scored) Laci Rennaker; (penalty scored) M'Kenna Hayes
