= 2019 Big Sky Conference women's soccer tournament =

- Classification: Division I
- Teams: 6
- Matches: 5
- Site: Jackson Stadium; Greeley, Colorado
- Champions: Northern Colorado (2nd title)
- Winning coach: Tim Barrera (2nd title)
- MVP: Taylor Bray (Northern Colorado)
- Broadcast: None

2019 Big Sky Conference women's soccer standings
	Conf.						Overall
Team	W		L		T	PCT	W		L		T	PCT
Montana ‍†‍‍	6	–	0	–	3	.833	7	–	6	–	6	.526
Sacramento St. ‍‍‍	5	–	0	–	4	.778	11	–	2	–	6	.737
Eastern Washington ‍‍‍	6	–	2	–	1	.722	11	–	8	–	2	.571
Northern Colorado ‍‍‡‍^{y}	4	–	2	–	3	.611	9	–	11	–	4	.458
Northern Arizona ‍‍‍	4	–	3	–	2	.556	8	–	8	–	3	.500
Portland St. ‍‍‍	3	–	6	–	0	.333	4	–	15	–	0	.211
Idaho St. ‍‍‍	2	–	5	–	2	.333	5	–	12	–	2	.316
Weber St. ‍‍‍	1	–	3	–	5	.389	2	–	10	–	5	.265
Idaho ‍‍‍	1	–	6	–	2	.222	2	–	14	–	3	.184
Southern Utah ‍‍‍	1	–	6	–	2	.222	1	–	15	–	2	.111
† – Conference champion ‡ – 2019 Big Sky Tournament champion y – Invited to the NCAA tournament As of December 9, 2019; Rankings from United Soccer Coaches Poll; Source:The Big Sky Conference

The 2019 Big Sky Conference women's soccer tournament was the postseason women's soccer tournament for the Big Sky Conference held from November 6 to November 10, 2019. The five-match tournament took place at Jackson Stadium, home of the regular-season champions Montana Grizzlies. The six-team single-elimination tournament consisted of three rounds based on seeding from regular season conference play. The Montana Grizzlies were the defending champions and did not successfully defend their title, losing to the Northern Colorado Bears in the semifinals. Northern Colorado would go on to win the tournament, with a 1–0 win over Eastern Washington in the final. This was the second overall title for Northern Colorado, and the second title for coach Tim Barrera.

== Bracket ==
First round Wednesday, Nov. 6
3	Eastern Washington	3
6	Portland State	0
4	Northern Colorado	2^{(OT)}
5	Northern Arizona	1

Semifinals; Friday, Nov. 8
2	Sacramento State	1
3	Eastern Washington	2^{(2OT)}
1	Montana	1
4	Northern Colorado	2^{(OT)}

Final; Sunday, Nov. 10
3	Eastern Washington	0
4	Northern Colorado	1

== Schedule ==
=== First Round ===
November 6, 2019	#3 Eastern Washington	3–0	#6 Portland State	Greeley, CO
12:00 p.m. MT	Sariah Keister 54'; Taylor Matheny (yellow card) 61'; Maddie Morgan 77', 79'	Report	(yellow card) 84' Paige Donathan	Stadium: Jackson Stadium; Attendance: 125

November 6, 2019	#4 Northern Colorado	2–1 (a.e.t.)	#5 Northern Arizona	Greeley, CO
3:00 p.m. MT	48' (o.g.); Lexi Pulley 93'	Report	(yellow card) 50' Sam Larberg; 60' Kayla Terhune; (red card) 93' Madi Montgomery	Stadium: Jackson Stadium

=== Semifinals ===
November 8, 2019	#2 Sacramento State	1–2 (a.e.t.)	#3 Eastern Washington	Greeley, CO
12:00 p.m. MT	Erika Munoz 40'	Report	61' Madison Kem; 101' Maddie Morgan	Stadium: Jackson Stadium

November 8, 2019	#1 Montana	1–2 (a.e.t.)	#4 Northern Colorado	Greeley, CO
3:00 p.m. MT	Kendall Furrow (yellow card) 59'; Alexa Coyle 79'; Sydney Haustein (yellow card) 93'	Report	14' Maddie Barkow; (yellow card) 52' Kenzie Engelkins; (yellow card) 59' Olivia Seddon; (yellow card) 60' Ashley Franza; 99' Taylor Bray	Stadium: Jackson Stadium

=== Final ===
November 10, 2019	#3 Eastern Washington	0–1	#4 Northern Colorado	Greeley, CO
12:00 p.m. MT	Brooke Dunbar (yellow card) 58'; Kendall Pope (yellow card) 74'; Hadley Bodner (yellow card) 78'; Janae Lee (yellow card) 87'; Brittany Delridge (yellow card) 87'	Report	8' Taylor Bray; (yellow card) 40' Kaitlyn Meeder	Stadium: Jackson Stadium

== Statistics ==
=== Goalscorers ===
2 Goals

- Taylor Bray (Northern Colorado)
- Maddie Morgan (Eastern Washington)

1 Goal

- Maddie Barkow (Northern Colorado)
- Alexa Coyle (Montana)
- Sariah Keister (Eastern Washington)
- Madison Kem (Eastern Washington)
- Maddie Morgan (Eastern Washington)
- Erika Munoz (Sacramento State)
- Lexi Pulley (Northern Colorado)
- Kayla Terhune (Northern Arizona)

Own Goals

- Northern Arizona vs. Northern Colorado

== All Tournament Team ==
Player	Team
**Taylor Bray**	Northern Colorado
Maddie Barkow	Northern Colorado
Ashley Franza	Northern Colorado
Mackenzie Bray	Northern Colorado
Lexi Pulley	Northern Colorado
Kelsee Winston	Eastern Washington
Madison Kem	Eastern Washington
Maddie Morgan	Eastern Washington
Brittany Delridge	Eastern Washington
Alexa Coyle	Montana
Kayla Terhune	Northern Arizona
Erika Munoz	Sacramento State

MVP in bold
