= Lindsi Jennings =

American soccer player (born 2000)

Personal information
- Full name: Lindsi Marie Jennings
- Date of birth: January 15, 2000 (age 26)
- Place of birth: Conroe, Texas, U.S.
- Height: 5 ft 9 in (1.75 m)
- Position: Defender

Youth career
- Colorado Storm

College career
Years	Team	Apps	(Gls)
2018–2021	Northern Colorado Bears	51	(1)
2021–2022	LSU Tigers	40	(3)

Senior career*
Years	Team	Apps	(Gls)
2023	Houston Dash	3	(0)
- * Club domestic league appearances and goals as of 15:26, June 15, 2026 (UTC)

Lindsi Marie Jennings (born January 15, 2000) is an American former professional soccer player who played as a defender. She played college soccer for the Northern Colorado Bears and the LSU Tigers before being selected in the third round of the 2023 NWSL Draft by the Houston Dash.

== Early life ==
Jennings was born in Conroe, Texas. Her family eventually moved to Aurora, Colorado, where Jennings played youth soccer for the Colorado Storm. She attended Grandview High School, where she was a three-year letterwinner operating from both the backline and in the midfield. In 2014 and 2015, she led Grandview to back-to-back Colorado state titles. Jennings committed to Mississippi State University and graduated from high school early, compelled to keep up with MSU's sizable contingent of 2018 early enrollees.

== College career ==
=== Northern Colorado Bears ===
Jennings spent the spring semester of 2018 training with the Mississippi State Bulldogs. She soon grew disenchanted with the Bulldogs' on-field style and ended up transferring to the University of Northern Colorado. She joined the Northern Colorado Bears as a walk-on player, subsisting on exclusively academic scholarships. In her first season of college soccer, Jennings started all 21 of UNC's games. She earned her first of three consecutive second-team All-Big Sky honors and was named Big Sky Co-Newcomer of the year.

As a sophomore in 2019, Jennings played every minute of the Big Sky tournament, which culminated in a 1–0 win over Eastern Washington that gave Northern Colorado its second conference tournament title in program history. Jennings' third year with the Bears was shortened and pushed back to the fall of 2021 due to the COVID-19 pandemic. She still played a large portion of her team's minutes and earned the honor of Big Sky Co-Defensive MVP. She departed from Northern Colorado having played in 51 games, starting in all but one.

=== LSU Tigers ===
Jennings transferred to Louisiana State University ahead of the 2021 fall season. She scored her first goal for the Tigers on September 5, 2021, flicking the ball into the goal with her heel in a 5–2 win over Arizona State. She started 12 of her 20 appearances in her first season at LSU, combining with the rest of the Tigers' backline to post 8 shutouts. The following year, Jennings played in the same number of games, but as a starter in each one. An LSU co-captain, she led the team to the second round of the 2022 NCAA tournament. Her two goals on the season came in back-to-back games, with the second of which being the game-winner in a 2–1 victory over Missouri. She capped off her collegiate career with All-Southeastern Conference first-team honors.

== Club career ==
Jennings was selected by the Houston Dash as the final pick of the third round of the 2023 NWSL Draft (36th overall). She became the third-ever LSU player to be drafted into the National Women's Soccer League. Jennings was not offered a contract with her hometown club until two games into the season. On April 7, 2023, the Dash announced that they had signed Jennings to her first professional deal, an injury replacement player contract. Jennings made her pro debut twelve days later, coming on as a second-half substitute for fellow LSU alumni Allysha Chapman in a NWSL Challenge Cup game against the Kansas City Current. The following month, she made her NWSL league debut in a game against the Portland Thorns. She went on to play in 2 more NWSL games and 4 more Challenge Cup games, with her season highlight coming in the form of a 90-minute performance in the Challenge Cup against Racing Louisville in June 2023. At the end of the season, the Dash chose not to exercise Jennings' contract option.

== Honors and awards ==
Northern Colorado Bears

- Big Sky Conference women's soccer tournament: 2019

Individual

- First-team All-SEC: 2022
- Second-team All-Big Sky: 2018, 2019, 2020
- Big Sky Co-Newcomer of the year: 2018
- Big Sky Co-Defensive MVP: 2020
