= Ed Knecht =

American football player, coach, and administrator (1927–2018)

Biographical details
- Born: October 12, 1927; Toledo, Ohio, U.S.
- Died: June 8, 2018 (aged 90); Corvallis, Oregon, U.S.

Playing career
- 1946–1949: Toledo

Coaching career (HC unless noted)
- 1957–1959: Idaho (assistant)
- 1960–196x: Defiance HS (OH)
- 1964: Boise HS (ID)
- 1965–1968: Oregon State (freshmen/LB)
- 1974–1975: College of Idaho (assistant)
- 1976–1977: College of Idaho

Administrative career (AD unless noted)
- 1969–1973: Idaho

Edward Theodore Knecht (October 12, 1927 – June 8, 2018) was an American football coach and collegiate athletic director. He was the head coach at the College of Idaho in Caldwell from 1976 to 1976. Prior to the C of I, Knecht was the athletic director at the University of Idaho in Moscow from 1969 to 1973.
