= Go, Vandals, Go =

Song
- Written: 1930, 95 years ago
- Published: 1931, University of Idaho
- Genre: Collegiate fight song
- Songwriters: J. Morris O'Donnell (1912–1977)

"Go, Vandals, Go" is the official fight song of the University of Idaho in Moscow.

== History ==
The song was composed 95 years ago in 1930 by John Morris "Morey" O'Donnell, the freshman class vice president from Granite (between Coeur d'Alene and Sandpoint). He graduated from Coeur d'Alene High School, the UI law school, and became a prominent attorney in the state at Moscow. A member of Phi Delta Theta fraternity, O'Donnell was a talented pianist and had played internationally before college. The title is similar to cross-state rival Idaho State Bengals song Growl, Bengals, Growl.

The song was the freshman class' winning entry in the university's annual song and stunt fest in May 1930, and was soon played by the UI pep band at football games at MacLean Field. Previously, the Vandals had used a variation of "On, Wisconsin" as its fight song.

O'Donnell wrote the song almost entirely with whole notes and half notes to make it easy for a large football crowd to sing; he also added a heavy drumbeat to carry the spirit.

For many years, it has been cited as one of the top fight songs in the United States. For example, in 2002, Norm Maves, Jr. of The Oregonian in Portland described it as "the once and future king of college fight songs, with a fanfare lead-in that could motivate a successful infantry charge."

== Lyrics ==
Came a tribe from the North, brave and bold,
Bearing banners of Silver and Gold;
Tried and true to subdue all their foes
Go Vandals, go mighty Vandals!

Go, Vandals, go,
Fight on with hearts true and bold,
Foes will fall before your Silver and your Gold.

The victory cannot be withheld from thee,
So all bear down for Idaho,
Come on old Vandals, go!

I-D-A-H-O
Idaho, Idaho, Go! Go! Go!
