= St. Joseph Catholic High School (Ogden, Utah) =

Saint Joseph Catholic High School
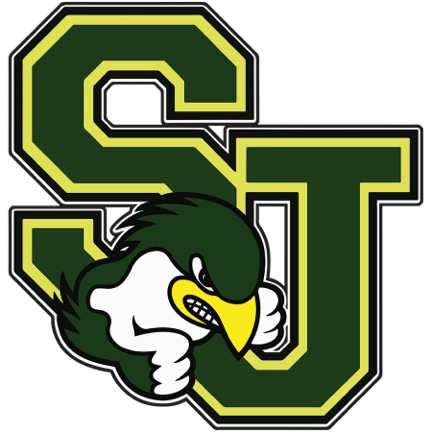

Location
- 1790 Lake Street; Ogden, Utah 84401; United States; 41°13′19″N 111°55′51″W

Information
- Type: Parochial School
- Motto: Believe Achieve Inspire
- Religious affiliation: Roman Catholic
- CEEB code: 450250
- Principal: Clay Jones
- Gender: Coeducational
- Colors: Green; Gold
- Athletics conference: 2A Region 17
- Mascot: Jayhawks
- Website: stjosephutah.org

Saint Joseph High Catholic School is a parochial school in Ogden, Utah. It was established by the Sisters of the Holy Cross and the Jesuit Fathers.

== Academics ==
SJCHS offers 65 courses with a choice of electives and vocational classes, and 15 Advanced Placement courses. Saint Joseph was selected in 2014 as one of the top 60 most challenging private schools in America by The Washington Post.

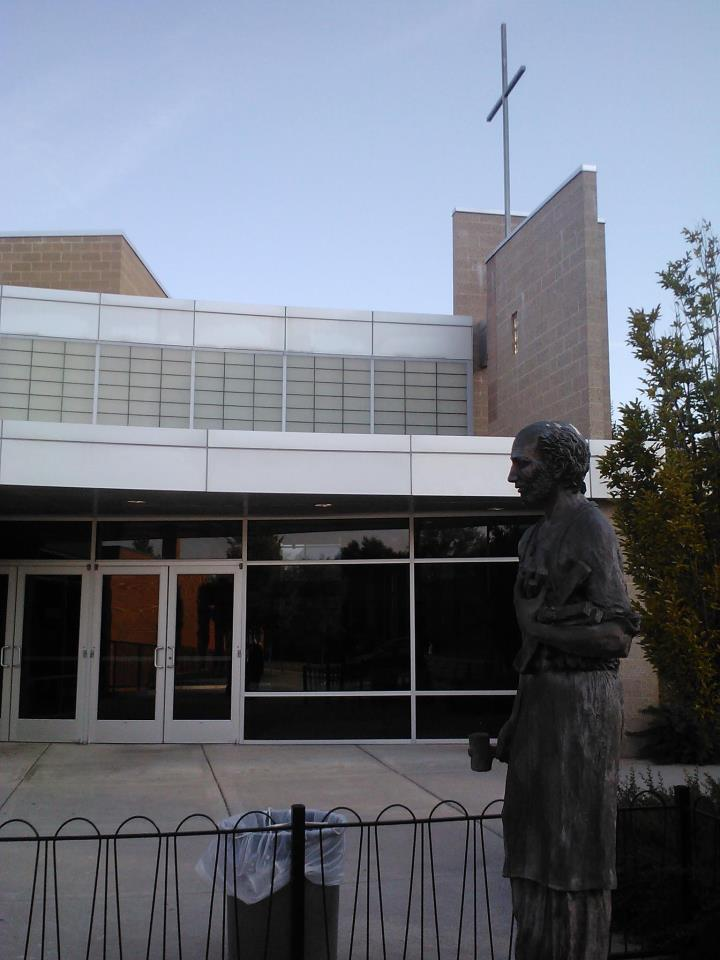
St. Joseph Fine Arts Building

== Athletics ==
Saint Joseph Catholic High Schools competes in Region 18 in the Utah High School Activities Association. It offers teams in football (8-man), volleyball, cross-country, cheer-leading, golf, basketball, basketball, baseball, softball, tennis, soccer, drill and track.

Athletic facilities include a gymnasiums for basketball and volleyball, locker rooms, weight room and soccer athletic field. The athletic teams are supported by a successful weight-lifting program. Student athletes have the option to take a weight-lifting and conditioning class as one of their eight classes in each of their four years of high school.

In its history, St. Joseph has won 52 state championships. Saint Joseph has won for seven years in a row the Deseret Morning News' All-Sports Award, given to a school that excels in athletics.

== Faith and community ==
The school's spiritual life is fostered by a Director of Campus Ministry and supported by the area priests. Every day after second period, the school prays together. All students are asked to serve those in need through a Christian Service Internship (forty hours/year for upperclassmen) led by a Christian Service coordinator. Prayer before assemblies, before ball games and before classes is frequent. The intellectual life of faith is supported by theology classes, required each year of high school.

== Student body ==
150-180 students. 24% of students belong to faiths other than Catholic. 74% percent of students are Caucasian, 14% are Hispanic, 6% are Asian, 3% are African Americans, 2% are Pacific Islanders, and 1% are American Indians.

== History ==
Catholic education in Ogden began over 130 years ago. Its beginnings can be traced to Saint Joseph Parish, which planned and organized a school in the old Saint Joseph Church in 1877. Classes began at Easter of that year.

In 1881, Saint Joseph School moved to a new building at the corner of 26th and Washington, which was built for the purpose of housing the school and its programs. In 1923, Bishop Glass dedicated the new Saint Joseph Grade School, built on the corner of 28th and Lincoln. 147 students were enrolled. Classes were held at this site until the fall of 1979.

Saint Joseph Grade School then purchased the Quincy School from the Ogden Board of Education. The Quincy building on the corner of 30th and Quincy Avenue serves as the present location for preschool through eighth grade. In 1952, Saint Joseph Catholic High School was built in 1790 Lake street in Ogden and serves as the present location for ninth through twelve grade.

Saint Joseph Catholic Schools (SJCS) serves nine parishes and missions in the greater Ogden area and is the only Catholic elementary school in Ogden.
