= Montana Lady Griz soccer =

American college soccer team

Montana Grizzlies women's soccer
- Founded: 1994; 32 years ago
- University: University of Montana
- Head coach: Stuart Gore
- Conference: Big Sky
- Location: Missoula, Montana, US
- Stadium: South Campus Stadium
- Nickname: Grizzlies
- Colors: Maroon and silver
Home	Away

NCAA tournament appearances
- 1999, 2000, 2011, 2018, 2020, 2021, 2025

Conference tournament championships
- 1999, 2000, 2011, 2018, 2020, 2021, 2025

The Montana Lady Griz soccer team represents University of Montana in NCAA Division I college soccer. Montana competes in the Big Sky Conference, where the squad has won eight tournament titles to date.

The Lady Griz play their home games at South Campus Stadium, opened in 1995. The venue has hosted several Big Sky tournament finals since 1997.

== History ==
The Montana women's soccer program began play in 1994.

The Grizzlies have made the NCAA tournament in 1999, 2000, 2011, 2018, 2020, 2021, and 2025.

In 2025, Montana won the Big Sky championship in a shootout win over Weber State, earning the conference's NCAA tournament automatic bid. It was the 8th conference title for the team.

== Coaching history ==
#	Name	Tenure	Record
1	Betsy Duerksen	1994–2003	117–69–7
2	Neil Sedgwick	2004–2010	37–77–13
3	Mark Plakorus	2011–2017	65–56–24
4	Chris Citowicki	2018–present	68–32–27 (Note: As of 2024.)
