= Idaho Vandals =

Intercollegiate sports teams of the University of Idaho

- University: University of Idaho
- Nickname: Vandals
- NCAA: Division I (FCS)
- Conference: Big Sky (primary) Big West (men's golf) MPSF (women's swim & dive)
- Athletic director: Terry Gawlik
- Location: Moscow, Idaho
- Varsity teams: 16 (7 men's and 9 women's)
- Football stadium: Kibbie Dome
- Basketball arena: ICCU Arena
- Soccer stadium: Kibbie Dome
- Aquatics center: UI Swim Center
- Golf course: University of Idaho Golf Course
- Tennis venue: Kibbie Dome
- Volleyball arena: Memorial Gymnasium
- Colors: Silver and Vandal gold
- Mascot: Joe Vandal
- Fight song: Go, Vandals, Go
- Cheer: I-D-A-H-O, IDAHO, IDAHO GO GO GO!
- Website: govandals.com
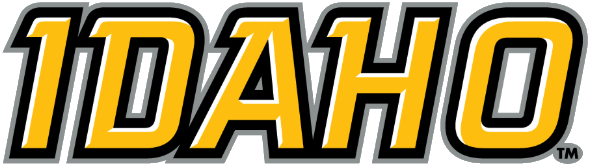

Team NCAA championships
- 3

Individual and relay NCAA champions
- 23

The Idaho Vandals are the intercollegiate athletic teams representing the University of Idaho, located in Moscow, Idaho. The Vandals compete at the NCAA Division I level as a member of the Big Sky Conference.

The football team was an independent for the 2013 season due to a major wave of departures from the Western Athletic Conference that left just two football-playing schools. In July 2014, Idaho returned its football team to the Sun Belt Conference and the other sports rejoined the Big Sky Conference.

The university's official colors are silver and gold, honoring the state's mining tradition. Because these metallic colors in tandem are not visually complementary for athletic uniforms, black and gold are the prevalent colors for the athletic teams, with an occasional use of silver, similar to Colorado, whose official colors are also silver and gold. When Idaho moved out of the Big Sky to the Big West in 1996, the yellow "Green Bay" gold was changed to metallic "Vegas" gold. Yellow gold and black were the colors used by most of the varsity teams from 1978 to 1996, initiated by first-year head football coach Jerry Davitch's new uniforms for 1978.

On April 27, 2016, it was reported that the Vandals would become the first football program to voluntarily drop from the FBS level to the FCS level, beginning in 2018. All previous programs which have moved from FBS down to FCS did so because the NCAA downgraded either the individual programs or their conferences.

== Conference affiliations ==
From 1922 through spring 1959, Idaho competed with the original eight schools of the Pac-12 as a member of the Pacific Coast Conference (PCC). The PCC disbanded in the spring of 1959 and Idaho competed as an independent for four years. The Big Sky Conference was founded in 1963 and Idaho became a charter member, though it did not play a conference schedule in football until 1965.

Big Sky logo in Idaho's colors

From 1963 to 1977, the Big Sky Conference was a "college division" (later Division II) for football. Nevertheless, Idaho maintained its "university division" (Division I) status, with its additional football scholarships, by playing a non-conference schedule of Division I teams. An exception came in August 1967, when the football program was involuntarily dropped to the college division for two seasons. Idaho was elevated back to university status in July 1969 and continued as Division I when the three numbered divisions were formed in 1973. Five seasons later in 1978, the Vandals were dropped to the new Division I-AA, as the Big Sky moved up from Division II.

In 1996, Idaho joined the Big West Conference in order to move to Division I-A after 18 years in I-AA. The Big West discontinued football after the 2000 season, so Idaho became a "football-only" affiliate member of the Sun Belt Conference for four seasons (2001–04). The Vandals joined the Western Athletic Conference (WAC) in July 2005.

After nine years, Idaho left the Western Athletic Conference in July 2014, following a large defection of members to other conferences. The WAC dropped football after the 2012 season, as only two members with football programs remained, Idaho and New Mexico State. The Vandal football team was an independent for the 2013 season, and rejoined the Sun Belt Conference as an affiliate member in 2014, after a decade-long departure. The other sports shifted back to the Big Sky Conference, rejoining after an 18-year absence.

The Sun Belt Conference announced on March 1, 2016, that the affiliation agreement with Idaho and New Mexico State would not be extended past the 2017 season. In 2018, the Vandals rejoined Big Sky Conference football, becoming the first football program to voluntarily drop from the FBS level to the FCS level.

== Sports sponsored ==
Men's sports	Women's sports
Basketball	Basketball
Cross country	Cross country
Football	Golf
Golf	Soccer
Tennis	Tennis
Track and field^{†}	Track and field^{†}
	Swimming and diving
	Volleyball
† – Track and field includes both indoor and outdoor

=== Track and field ===
Olympians

- Dan O'Brien (b. 1966), a hurdler on the UI track team in the late 1980s, won the gold medal in the decathlon at the 1996 Summer Olympics in Atlanta, as well as multiple world championships. From Klamath Falls, Oregon, he received his bachelor's degree in 1993, and the outdoor track and field stadium where O'Brien trained for these world titles was named for him in September 1996.
- Joachim Olsen (b. 1977) of Denmark, the 2004 Olympic silver medalist (originally bronze) in the shot put, competed for the Vandals from 1999 to 2003, winning the NCAA outdoor title in 2000. He was a ten-time All-American and never finished worse than third in the shot put in eight career NCAA outdoor and indoor appearances.
- Angela Whyte (b. 1980) of Canada was a four-time NCAA All-American and five-time Big West champion at Idaho, where she helped lead the women's team to 2001 and 2003 Big West team championships. She also earned Big West Female Athlete of the Year honors in 2001 and Big West Female Track Athlete of the Year honors in 2003. She was a member of Canada's 2004 and 2008 Olympic track teams.
- Hec Edmundson (1886–1964) was born and raised in Moscow and attended the UI's prep school. A 1910 graduate (agriculture) of the UI, he was the state's first Olympian, in 1912 at Stockholm. Edmundson finished seventh in the 800 meters and sixth in the 400 meters. He later coached the Vandal basketball team, then moved to Seattle to coach the Washington Huskies in basketball and track. The UW Pavilion was named for him in 1948, known locally since as "Hec Ed."
- Alycia Butterworth (b. 1992) of Canada was an Honorable Mention NCAA All-American and two-time WAC Champion in the 3000m Steeplechase at Idaho. She also finished second in the WAC and the Big Sky in the steeple. She made the 2017 IAAF World Track & Field Championships in the 3000m Steeplechase. Alycia represented Canada at the 2020 Tokyo Olympic Games in her signature event, the steeplechase. She finished 10th in her heat, after falling during the race.

=== Former sports ===
==== Baseball ====
Both Idaho and Boise State discontinued baseball after the 1980 season, citing budget constraints. Idaho State dropped its program six years earlier in 1974, when the Big Sky stopped sponsorship of baseball and four other sports.

==== Boxing ====
Under head coach "Limehouse Lou" August, the Vandals won the NCAA boxing championship in 1940 and 1941, and shared another national title with Gonzaga in 1950 under head coach Frank Young. (The Inland Northwest was a hotbed of the sport as Idaho, Washington State, and Gonzaga had top programs and won national titles.) Due to budget reasons, the program was dropped 72 years ago in June 1954. Collegiate boxing fell from favor in the 1950s as more and more schools dropped their teams. The NCAA ended its sponsorship in January 1961, following the death of a Wisconsin boxer in the 1960 championships.

==== Field hockey ====
The final season of women's field hockey was in the fall of 1980; it was discontinued that December.

==== Gymnastics ====
The final season for women's gymnastics was 44 years ago in 1982; the program was cut during a state budget crisis.

==== Skiing ====
The Vandal ski team was eliminated 54 years ago in October 1972 to economize, and the Big Sky dropped skiing in May 1974, along with four other sports. UI's team dated back to 1941.

==== Men's swimming ====
The men's swimming program had a 58-year history; it was discontinued after the 1986 season, 40 years ago. The Big Sky dropped swimming a dozen years earlier in 1974, along with four other sports.

After over a decade as a varsity sport, women's swimming was cut after the 1985 season, then returned 19 years later in the fall of 2004 under head coach Tom Jager.

==== Wrestling ====
The last season for Vandal wrestling was 1973.

==== Fencing, rifle ====
Prior to World War II, Idaho also fielded teams in fencing and rifle.

== Facilities ==
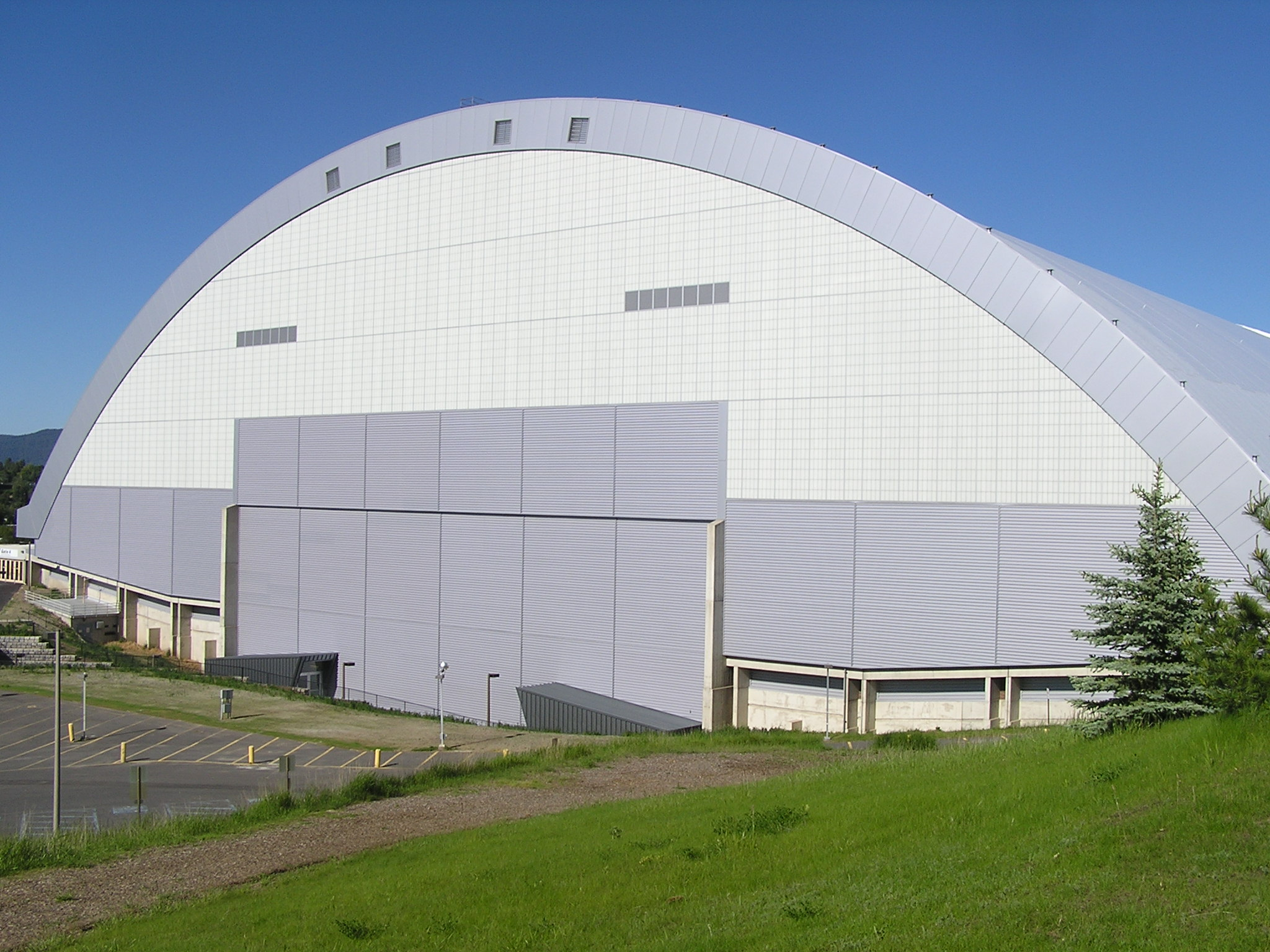
The Kibbie Dome, home of UI football, track & field, and tennis teams

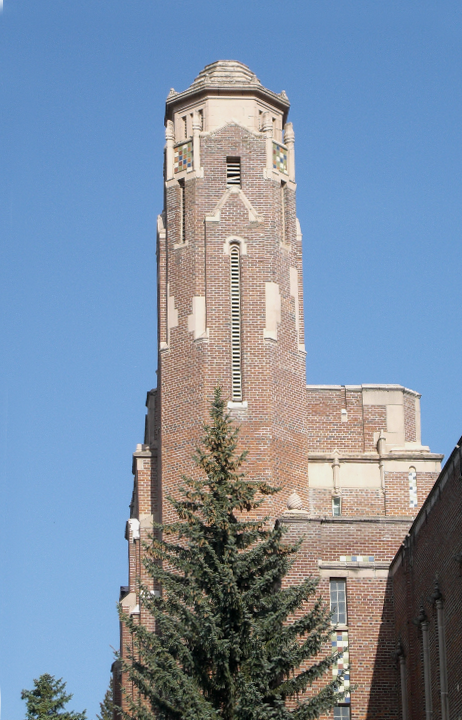
Memorial Gym Tower

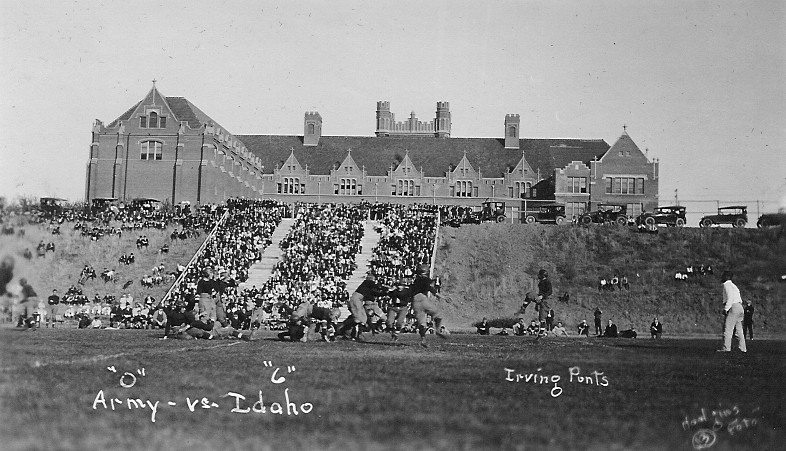
MacLean Field in 1921; it was the home of Vandals' football from 1914 through 1936; Baseball continued here through 1966

The University of Idaho has numerous on-campus facilities for the athletic program. The primary facility is the Kibbie Dome, a 16,000 seat indoor stadium for football, basketball, indoor tennis, and indoor track. From 2001 to 2020, massive black curtains encircled the basketball seating configuration and the arena was called the "Cowan Spectrum", with a capacity of 7,000. Underneath the football turf is a five-lane, 290-meter (320 yd) track and nine tennis courts. East end additions (1982, 2004) to the Kibbie Dome house the athletic department offices, locker rooms, weight room, and training facilities. The Kibbie Dome's concrete grandstands opened in October 1971 upon the site of the wooden Neale Stadium (1937–68). (photo) An outdoor stadium for four years, it was fully enclosed in 1975 and its playing surface sits at an elevation of 2,610 feet (795 m) above sea level.

The historic Memorial Gymnasium (1928) is the home for women's volleyball, and hosted early season basketball games during the Vandals football season. It also hosted all men's and women's basketball home games in the 2020–21 season due to COVID-19 football scheduling disruptions, specifically the decision of the Big Sky Conference to move its football season from fall 2020 to spring 2021. South of the "Mem Gym" is the Swim Center and the P.E. Building (formerly the new "Women's Gym"), which houses practice gymnasiums; these facilities were completed in 1970. The Mem Gym formerly had a swimming pool in its basement.

Other outdoor facilities include the 18-hole championship UI Golf Course, directly south of the Kibbie Dome. The first nine holes debuted in 1937 and the second nine opened in 1970; the 1949 clubhouse was replaced in 1969. West of the Kibbie Dome is the 400 m (437 yd) outdoor track and field stadium, opened in early 1972 and named for newly crowned Olympic champion decathlete Dan O'Brien in September 1996. A concrete grandstand at the finish line in the southeast corner seats approximately 1,000. The track complex was fully refurbished in 2011 and hosted the WAC outdoor championships in 2012.

In addition, there are outdoor athletic practice fields on the grounds directly east of the Kibbie Dome. Formerly, these grass fields were for varsity football practice only. SprinTurf (similar to FieldTurf) and lighting was installed in 2005 and the fields are now available for intramurals and general recreation. Six outdoor tennis courts are east of these fields, west of the P.E. Building, and four more are on the lower Administration Lawn.

MacLean Field, the campus' original athletics area, was on the grounds south of the Memorial Gym, with the spectators on the eastern embankment. Football was played here from 1914 until Neale Stadium opened in 1937; the baseball team called MacLean home for another three decades, until the construction of the College of Education building displaced the infield after the 1966 season.(aerial campus photo – circa 1940) Prior to 1940, the baseball infield at MacLean was in the opposite (southwest) corner and lacked infield grass. It was covered by the athletic field house in 1949, which was razed following the enclosure of the Kibbie Dome in 1975, and became outdoor tennis courts. The new baseball diamond was constructed at the north end of campus; first used in April 1967, it was named for Guy Wicks in May 1969. Wicks (1902–68), a UI graduate, was a Vandal baseball player in the early 1920s, a head coach in two sports in the 1940s, and later an associate dean of students. Prior to the construction of the library (opened 1957), it was the site of outdoor tennis courts.

The university opened the new Idaho Central Credit Union Arena in September 2021, with the first event taking place in late October. The 4,200-seat facility currently houses men's and women's basketball.

== Mascot ==
Idaho's athletic teams go by a name earned in the early 20th century by a basketball team coached by Hec Edmundson, whose teams played defense with such intensity and ferocity that sports writers said they "vandalized" their opponents. The mark made by the 1917 team went far deeper than wins and losses on the court. In 1917, Harry Lloyd "Jazz" McCarty – a writer for the student newspaper, The Argonaut – tagged the team with a new nickname in a pregame write-up: "The opening game with Whitman will mark a new epoch in Idaho basketball history, for the present gang of 'Vandals' have the best material that has ever carried the 'I' into action." McCarty's indirect suggestion stuck. By 1921, McCarty and Edward Maslin Hulme, the dean of the College of Liberal Arts, succeeded in their push to have Vandals officially adopted as the nickname for Idaho teams.

The current mascot is Joe Vandal; in response to Title IX concerns in the late 1970s, a new abstract logo was introduced and featured both genders.

== Rivalries ==
Location of Division I rivals of the University of Idaho
Big Sky schools are shown in italics.

=== Washington State ===
Since returning to Division I-A status for football in 1996, Idaho has rekindled its rivalry with Washington State, eight miles (13 km) to the west in Pullman. The annual game, usually played at Martin Stadium in Pullman, was renewed in 1998 after just two meetings in two decades, and is referred to as the "Battle of the Palouse." The Cougars hold an immense advantage in the series (71–16–3, .806), but the Vandals did win back-to-back meetings in 1999 and 2000, following 14 straight Cougar victories from 1966 to 1998. The last game played on the Idaho side of the border in this series was in 1966, a mudbath won by WSU late in the fourth quarter. This game followed consecutive Idaho victories in 1964 and 1965, which had been preceded by nine straight Cougar wins. Two of the recent games played in Pullman (1999 and 2001) were designated as Idaho "home games" to help reach existing NCAA minimum attendance requirements. The 2004 game was a designated Idaho home game for revenue purposes. The 2003 game was played in Seattle at Seahawks Stadium. The contests from 2005 on were all WSU home games.

The game in 2007 was a 45–28 WSU victory, their seventh straight over the Vandals. At the request of Vandals head coach Robb Akey, a former WSU assistant who became the Vandal head coach in 2007, the game will be played occasionally rather than annually. The teams did not meet again until 2013, another WSU victory at 42–0. They met in 2016 at Pullman, a 56–6 victory for the Cougars. The next meeting had been scheduled for 2020 at Pullman, but was canceled when WSU's home of the Pac-12 Conference announced that its members would only play conference games that season, if at all, due to the COVID-19 pandemic.

=== Boise State ===
Boise is 300 highway miles (480 km) south of Moscow, and many UI students are from the Treasure Valley (greater Boise area), the major population area of the state. Idaho had a major in-state rivalry with Boise State since 1971; BSU joined the Big Sky in 1970 but the football teams did not meet that season. BSU moved up (& UI moved down) to Division I-AA in 1978, then both opted up to Division I-A in 1996, joining the Big West.

BSU was 8–2–1 in the first 11 meetings, including five in a row from 1977 to 1981. Idaho immediately followed with 12 straight wins from 1982 to 1993 and won 15 of 17 before Boise State began the last 12-game winning streak in 1999, in which BSU dominated the Vandals. The composite score for the last dozen games was 613–213, an average BSU victory margin of over 33 points per game, which ranged from 14 to 58 points. Boise State won 13 of 15 games over Idaho since both teams moved up to Division I-A (now FBS) in 1996. Beginning in 2001, the winner of the football game was awarded the Governor's Trophy; Boise State won it every year.

Boise State left the WAC after the 2010 season to join the Mountain West Conference, leaving no future for the football in-state rivalry. As of December 2016, the 2010 game was the last in the series, with no future games currently scheduled. In basketball, Idaho now plays Boise State in a neutral site game in the Boise area, away from the Broncos' ExtraMile Arena. This is a response to Boise State's refusal to schedule Idaho in football.

=== Montana ===
For most of its history, Idaho had an intense interstate rivalry with the University of Montana in Missoula, approximately 200 miles (320 km) east. The teams have met for football 84 times (second only to the 91 games with Washington State). Idaho and Montana first played in 1903, and played every year from 1914 to 1995 (except during the war years of 1918 and 1943–44, when neither school had a team). Montana was also a member of the Pacific Coast Conference until 1950, and a fellow charter member of the Big Sky in 1963. Idaho leads the overall series 55–27–2 (.667), but Montana has dominated the rivalry since 1991. The Idaho–Montana rivalry was renewed as a conference rivalry in non-football sports when Idaho rejoined the Big Sky in 2014, and the football version was renewed in 2018 upon Idaho's return to Big Sky football.

The teams played only five times between Idaho's departure for Division I-A in 1996 and its return to FCS (formerly Division I-AA) in advance of the 2018 season, with the I-AA Montana Grizzlies winning the last four, most recently in 2003. Since the departure of Idaho, Boise State, and Nevada from the Big Sky to Division I-A in the 1990s, the Montana Grizzlies have been the dominant I-AA/FCS football program in the West, though pushed strongly in the last part of the 2010s by Eastern Washington.

The winner of the Idaho-Montana game claims the Little Brown Stein trophy.

=== Idaho State ===
Idaho and Idaho State have enjoyed a moderate rivalry since 1963, the year ISU became a university and both schools joined the new Big Sky conference as charter members. The schools are separated by a significant distance, Pocatello in southeastern Idaho is over 500 road miles (800 km) from Moscow. Idaho has traditionally been dominant in this rivalry, particularly in football. The football rivalry was most intense and equal in the 1970s and 1980s, but the teams played only sparingly during Idaho's 1996–2017 absence from Big Sky football, with Idaho winning all four contests. Their last game before Idaho's return to Big Sky football was in 2008 in Moscow, with Idaho winning 42–27. The Vandals had won 11 of the 12 meetings between 1988 and 2017;. Idaho has won 4 out of the 6 games played since the Vandal's return to Big Sky football.

== Athletic directors ==
Name	Years	Notes
Wilfred Bleamaster	1916–1920	
Thomas Kelley	1920–1922	
Robert Mathews	1922–1926	
Charles Erb	1926–1928	
Ralph Hutchinson	1928–1929	
Leo Calland	1929–1935	
Ted Bank	1935–1941	
George Greene	1941–1950	
Babe Brown (acting)	1943–1946	
Gale Mix	1950–1954	
Robert Gibb	1954–1960	
Skip Stahley	1960–1964	
John Thomas (interim)	1964–1965	
Paul Ostyn	1965–1969	
Ed Knecht	1969–1973	
Leon Green	1973–1977	
Bill Belknap	1977–1988	
Gary Hunter	1988–1992	
Pete Liske	1992–1996	
Oval Jaynes	1996–1998	
Mike Bohn	1998–2003	
Rob Spear	2003–2018	
Pete Isakson (interim)	2018–2019	
Terry Gawlik (Sept. 1)	2019–	

- Before 1941, the head football coach was also the athletic director, except for the 1919 and 1928 football seasons.
- Skip Stahley had been head football coach for six seasons when he became athletic director in 1960;
  he held both positions for two football seasons, then stepped down as head coach after 1961.
