= Sacramento State Hornets =

Athletic teams of California State University, Sacramento

- University: California State University, Sacramento
- Nickname: Hornets
- NCAA: Division I (FBS)
- Conference: Big West (primary); MAC (football, women's rowing); MPSF (women's gymnastics, men's and women's indoor track & field)
- Athletic director: Mark Orr
- Location: Sacramento, California
- Varsity teams: 21 (22 in 2027–28)
- Football stadium: Hornet Stadium
- Basketball arena: Hornets Nest
- Baseball stadium: John Smith Field
- Softball stadium: Shea Stadium
- Soccer stadium: Hornet Field
- Other venues: Haggin Oaks Golf Complex; Livermore Community Park; Sacramento State Aquatic Center; Sacramento State Tennis Courts; Valley Hi Country Club
- Colors: Green and gold
- Mascot: Herky
- Fight song: "Fight, Hornet, Fight!"
- Website: hornetsports.com

The Sacramento State Hornets (also Sac State Hornets) is the team that represents California State University, Sacramento in intercollegiate athletics.

The school fields 21 teams including men and women's basketball, cross country, golf, rowing, soccer, tennis, and track and field; women's-only gymnastics, beach volleyball, volleyball, and softball; and men's-only baseball and football. The Hornets compete in NCAA Division I, and are members of the Big West Conference (BWC), having moved from the Big Sky Conference in July 2026. Five sports that are not sponsored by the BWC play elsewhere. At the time the BWC move was announced in June 2025, Sac State's football affiliation was in flux. Initially, football would have become an FCS Independent, but that team started a transition to Division I FBS as a football affiliate of the Mid-American Conference (MAC). Sac State would later add women's rowing to its MAC membership, also effective in 2026–27. Women's gymnastics, as well as men's and women's indoor track & field, compete in the Mountain Pacific Sports Federation. The university plans to add women's flag football by the start of the 2027–28 NCAA Division I season.

== Nickname ==
The Sacramento State official team nickname is the "Hornets."

== History ==
=== Division II and Division III eras ===
The university has achieved multiple national championships as a Division III and Division II school. The school has also been a National Runner-up 8 times including Softball in 1989 (D-II), Women's Volleyball in 1979 and 1989 (D-II), Baseball in 1988 (D-II), Women's Track and Field in 1981 (AIAW D-II), Men's Cross Country in 1979 (D-II), Football in 1964 (CDN), and Men's Basketball (1962 CDN). Prior to AIAW softball division classifications, the softball team played in two Women's College World Series in 1976 and 1977.

=== Move to Division I and FCS referendum ===
Big Sky Conference logo in Sacramento State's colors

In November 1986, then-university president Donald Gerth, influenced by an athletic advisory board study, announced a five-year plan to elevate the program to the Division I level. The announcement, which included a reinstatement of the Hornet tennis team, upheld a student election which doubled student-activity fees from $13 to $26 per semester in order to finance the move, providing a more than $175,000 boost into the athletic budget per semester.

Then in 1995, following a reported $1.1 million deficit stemming from elevating the program up to the Division I-AA level (today known as FCS), Sacramento State students voted to raise their fees from $5 to $45 per semester to keep Hornet football, with 62 percent of voters supporting the increase.

=== Discussion of move to FBS level ===
During 2010–2014 NCAA conference realignment, there was speculation that the Hornets' Athletic department would like to move the football team to the Football Bowl Subdivision (FBS) due to the population base of Sacramento (ranked 20th-largest in college sports), the (enrollment) size of the university and the attractiveness of recruiting in the Sac-Joaquin Section.

During realignment, the Western Athletic Conference (WAC; since renamed the United Athletic Conference) had shown interest in adding Sacramento State as a member. To make the move to the FBS, however, the school needed to add an additional sport for women in order to meet the criteria of Title IX, and also needed to fund a new sports complex for men's and women's basketball and volleyball because their arena was inadequate for FBS-level sports and severely outdated (with a crowd capacity of 1,012 people). Sacramento State was unable to fund a massive facility upgrade for their athletic facilities (including basketball/volleyball, football, baseball and softball among others) in order to move to the FBS due to economic reasons and resistance from students and faculty members because of increasing tuition and overall cost. To become an FBS member, the football program would have been required to have an attendance average of 15,000 each season and the athletic department needed to increase overall funds for their athletic programs. On June 6, 2011, Big Sky Commissioner Doug Fullerton announced that "We're in a better place than the WAC is," marking an end of fan and community attempts to move to FBS-level sports during that period.

Conversely, on February 15, 2026, the school announced that it was joining the Mid-American Conference as a football only member starting in the 2026 season.

== Sports sponsored ==
Most varsity teams representing Sac State compete in the Big West Conference. In sports not sponsored by the Big West, football and women's rowing compete in the Mid-American Conference, and women's gymnastics plus men's and women's indoor track & field compete in the Mountain Pacific Sports Federation.

Men's sports	Women's sports
Baseball	Basketball
Basketball	Beach volleyball
Cross country	Cross country
Football	Flag Football (2027–28)
Golf	Golf
Soccer	Gymnastics
Tennis	Rowing
Track and field^{†}	Soccer
	Softball
	Tennis
	Track and field^{†}
	Volleyball
† – Track and field includes both indoor and outdoor.

=== Baseball ===
The Sacramento State Hornets baseball team is the varsity intercollegiate baseball team of California State University, Sacramento. The team plays its home games at John Smith Field.

Notable baseball players for the Sacramento State Hornets include:

- Cuno Barragan
- Erik Bennett
- Fred Besana
- Keith Brown
- Leon Brown
- Scott Burcham
- Roland de la Maza
- Patrick Edwards
- Mike Fischlin
- Jack Heron
- Rhys Hoskins
- Mitch Lively
- Buck Martinez
- Matt Myers
- James Outman
- Ron Stone
- La Schelle Tarver
- Tim Wheeler
- Gary Wilson

=== Basketball ===
==== Men's basketball ====
The Sacramento State Hornets men's basketball team represents California State University, Sacramento. The team plays its home games at the Hornets Nest.

==== Women's basketball ====
The Sacramento State Hornets women's basketball team represents California State University, Sacramento. The team plays its home games at the Hornets Nest.

=== Women's beach volleyball ===
The Sacramento State Hornets women's beach volleyball team participates in the Big West Conference. They have played their home games at Livermore Community Park since 2016 while previously playing at the Sacramento Softball Complex since the team's founding in 2013.

=== Cross country ===
The men's and women's cross country teams participate in the Big Sky Conference. They host their home meets at the Haggin Oaks Golf Complex.

=== Football ===
The Sacramento State Hornets football program began in 1954, coached by Dave Strong (the teams' first football head coach). The programs' first victory came in the second season, 1955, where the Hornets defeated Southern Oregon by a point, which was also their only win of the season (they were winless in their first season of football). Sacramento State Football first affiliated with the Northern California Athletic Conference (NCAC) from 1962 until 1972, where they were added to the Western Football Conference (WFC) from 1973 to 1985, then becoming part of the D-1AA American West Conference (AWC). In 1996, Sac State was added to the Big Sky Conference along with Portland State, becoming the first California school in the Big Sky. Hornet Stadium has been home to the football team since 1969.

The team have won 7 conference titles: 1964 and 1966-NCAC, 1986-WFC, 1995-AFC, 2019, 2021, and 2022-Big Sky. The Hornets football team participated in 2 bowls, the Pasadena Bowl in 1968 against Grambling State, where the Hornets lost 7-34, and the Camellia Bowl in 1964 (1964 College Division National Runner-up), where Montana State Bobcats defeated the Hornets 28–7.

Success against FBS opponents
One of Sac State's most notable wins came on September 3, 2011, in the season opener for both Sac State and Oregon State Beavers of the Pac-12 conference at Reser Stadium. The Hornets upset the Beavers in OT 29–28 with a 2-point conversion pass from QB Jeff Flemming to WR Brandyn Reed, beating an AQ Conference team for the first time in school history in front of an announced crowd of 41,581. The Beavers were a 23-point favorite coming into the game.

On September 8, 2012, the Hornets repeated the feat of defeating a Pac-12, upsetting the Colorado Buffaloes by a score 30–28 in Boulder in front of a crowd of 46,843. The Buffaloes were heavily favored in the match up. Walk-on Edgar Castaneda was awarded a full scholarship following his game-winning field goal.

On September 24, 2022, the Hornets defeated Colorado State Rams football 41-10 at Canvas Stadium, making this the largest win margin by Sacramento State over an FBS team. The 2022 team went on to go undefeated in the regular season for the first time in school, finishing 11-0.

On September 16, 2023, the Hornets defeated Stanford football team 30-23 at Stanford Stadium, making this year the second year in a row that Sacramento State beat an FBS team.

Rivalry

In all sports, the university has a rivalry with the University of California, Davis due to close proximity. The rivalry football game is called the Causeway Classic and is played for the Causeway Carriage, referring to the schools' connection by the long Yolo Causeway bridge over the Yolo Bypass floodway. More recently, the rivalry was officially expanded to include all sports the teams compete in. UC Davis leads the series 46 to 23 with no ties. This game has consistently drawn large crowds, with the largest on record being the 2022 Causeway Classic game, with 23,073, a Sacramento State Hornets Football record. Sacramento State's second main rival is CSU's sister school Cal Poly (SLO). The game is called the “Green and Gold” game for the similarities in color of the two school. Other notable rivalries includes Portland State, Eastern Washington, Weber State, and conference powers Montana State University and the University of Montana.

Past Hornets drafted in the NFL

Many Hornets have been drafted directly into the NFL onto teams such as the San Francisco 49ers, Minnesota Vikings, Seattle Seahawks, Philadelphia Eagles and the New England Patriots.

=== Soccer ===
==== Men's soccer ====
The Sacramento State Hornets men's soccer team have an NCAA Division I Tournament record of 2–2 through two appearances.

Year	Round	Opponent	Result
2009	First Round; Second Round	Loyola Marymount; UCLA	W 2–1; L 1–2
2010	First Round; Second Round	Santa Clara; UCLA	W 2–1; L 1–4

==== Women's soccer ====
The Sacramento State Hornets women's soccer team have an NCAA Division I Tournament record of 0–2 through two appearances.

Year	Round	Opponent	Result
2007	First Round	Stanford	L 0–7
2010	First Round	Stanford	L 0–3

=== Track and field ===
==== Indoor ====
The Sacramento State Hornets women's indoor track and field team appeared in the NCAA Division I Tournament one time, with that appearance being 56th place in the 2009–10 school year. The Sacramento State Hornets men's indoor track and field team never made the NCAA Division I Tournament.

Year	Gender	Ranking	Points
2010	Women	No. 56	1

=== Women's volleyball ===
The Sacramento State Hornets women's volleyball team have an NCAA Division I Tournament record of 2–10 through ten appearances.

Year	Round	Opponent	Result
1997	First Round	Pacific	L 1–3
1998	First Round; Second Round	Houston; Pacific	W 3–0; L 0–3
1999	First Round	Minnesota	L 0–3
2000	First Round	Santa Clara	L 0–3
2002	First Round	Stanford	L 0–3
2003	First Round	Stanford	L 0–3
2004	First Round	Saint Mary's	L 1–3
2005	First Round	Santa Clara	L 1–3
2006	First Round	Stanford	L 0–3
2007	First Round; Second Round	Minnesota; Stanford	W 3–1; L 0–3

== Championships ==
=== Team national championships ===
The Sacramento State Men’s Rugby Team is the only sport to win a Division I national championship, which occurred in 2023. Aside from that Sacramento State has never won a national championship at the NCAA Division I level.

Sacramento State won 1 national championship at the NCAA Division II level.

- Women's volleyball: 1981

Below are three national championships that were not bestowed by the NCAA:

- Women's golf – Division III (AIAW): 1981
- Softball – Division II (AIAW): 1981
- Women's volleyball – Division III (AIAW): 1980

Below are six national club team championships:

- Women's racquetball (USRA): 1986, 1987, 1988, 1989
- Men's rugby – Division II (USA Rugby): 2000

-Division IAA (USA Rugby):2023

Note: Those with no denoted division is assumed that the institution earned a national championship at the highest level.

=== Team tournament appearances ===
The Sacramento State Hornets competed in the NCAA Tournament across 12 active sports (5 men's and 7 women's) 55 times at the Division I FCS level.

- Football (3): 2019, 2021, 2023
- Baseball (3): 2014, 2017, 2019
- Women's basketball (1): 2023
- Women's gymnastics (4): 1999, 2006, 2007, 2008
- Men's soccer (2): 2009, 2010
- Women's soccer (2): 2007, 2010
- Softball (4): 1993, 1995, 2008, 2018
- Men's tennis (10): 1999, 2001, 2002, 2003, 2007, 2009, 2010, 2011, 2012, 2013
- Women's tennis (13): 2002, 2003, 2004, 2005, 2006, 2007, 2008, 2009, 2010, 2011, 2012, 2013, 2014
- Women's volleyball (10): 1997, 1998, 1999, 2000, 2002, 2003, 2004, 2005, 2006, 2007
- Women's indoor track and field (1): 2010
- Men's outdoor track and field (2): 2006, 2013
- Women's outdoor track and field (2): 1997, 2011

=== Individual national championships ===
Sacramento State had 3 Hornets win NCAA individual championships at the Division I Level.

NCAA individual championships
Order	School year	Athlete(s)	Sport	Source
1	1956–57	Jim Flood	Boxing	
2	1957–58	Jim Flood	Boxing	
3	1958–59	Terry Smith	Boxing	

At the NCAA Division II level, Sacramento State garnered 13 individual championships.

=== Conference championships ===
The university has accomplished 57 conference championships, the most occurring in the Big Sky. Including:

- Football (Big Sky, 3 total): 1964, 1966, 1986, 1995, 2019 (Co-Champions), 2021, 2022 (Co-Champions).
- Women's Basketball (Big Sky, 1 total): 2023
- Women's Volleyball (Big Sky, 11 total): 1997, 1998, 1999, 2000, 2001, 2002, 2003, 2004, 2005, 2006, 2007
- Men's Tennis (Big Sky, 12 total): 1998, 1999, 2001, 2002, 2003, 2006, 2007, 2008, 2009, 2010, 2011, 2012
- Women's Tennis (Big Sky, 11 total): 2002, 2003, 2004, 2005, 2006, 2007, 2008, 2009, 2010, 2011, 2012
- Men's Golf (Big Sky, 7 total): 1996, 1997, 2007 (Independent), 2008, 2009, 2012 (American Sky), 2017, 2021, 2024, 2025, 2026
- Women's Soccer (Big Sky, 2 total): 2007, 2010
- Women's Golf (Big Sky, 1 total): 2007
- Men's Indoor Track & Field (Big Sky, 3 total): 2007, 2008, 2011
- Men's Outdoor Track & Field (Big Sky, 1 total): 2011
- Women's Indoor Track & Field (Big Sky, 3 total): 2008, 2010, 2011
- Women's Outdoor Track & Field (Big Sky, 5 total): 2008, 2009, 2010, 2011, 2012
- Women's Gymnastics (Mountain Pacific, 6 total): 2002, 2003, 2005, 2014/2006, 2007 (WAC),
- Men's Soccer (Mountain Pacific, 3 total): 2001, 2009, 2010
- Softball (Pacific Coast, 1 total): 2008
- Baseball: (WAC, 3 total): 2012, 2014, 2017
- Women's Rowing (WIRAC, 5 total): 2000, 2001, 2006, 2007, 2009

== Traditions ==
=== Sacramento State Marching Band ===
The Sacramento State Marching Band performs at home football games each fall, as well as at numerous other university functions and also periodically at high school band festivals. The Hornet Revue Pep Band is a subgroup of the marching band, and performs at all home basketball (men's and women's) and volleyball games. Both bands are under the direction of Santiago Sabado.

=== Fight song ===
"Fight, Hornet, Fight!" is the official fight song of California State University, Sacramento. It is most widely known for being played by the Sacramento State Marching Band after scores at Sacramento State football games, and during the band's pre-game and halftime shows. It is played after a touchdown, field goal, extra point, or a safety.

"Fight, Hornet, Fight!" is also played as the band forms a tunnel for the football team as they enter Hornet Stadium before the beginning of each home game. After every Hornet win, the football team comes over to the sideline where the band's section is and sings along while the song is being played.

"Fight, Hornet, Fight!" was composed by Don McDonald in 1949. McDonald graduated from Sacramento State in 1952. The current arrangement of the song was written by former Band Director Jeffrey Edom in 1997.
