= Northern Arizona Lumberjacks =

Collegiate sports club of NAU, Flagstaff, AZ

NAU Lumberjacks
- University: Northern Arizona University
- NCAA: Division I (FCS)
- Conference: Big Sky Conference (primary); Western Athletic Conference (women's swimming and diving)
- Athletic director: Uri Farkas
- Location: Flagstaff, Arizona
- Varsity teams: 15
- Football stadium: Walkup Skydome
- Basketball arena: Walkup Skydome
- Soccer stadium: Lumberjack Stadium
- Other venues: J.C. Rolle Activity Center; Douglas J. Wall Aquatic Center
- Nickname: Lumberjacks
- Mascot: Louie
- Website: nauathletics.com
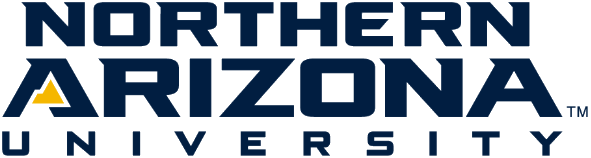

The NAU Lumberjacks are the varsity athletic teams representing Northern Arizona University in Flagstaff, Arizona in intercollegiate athletics. The school's mascot was adopted in 1946. The Lumberjacks compete in NCAA Division I and are full members of the Big Sky Conference with the exception of the women's swimming and diving team which is an affiliate member of the Western Athletic Conference (WAC).

== Sports sponsored ==
=== Individual teams ===
Men's	Women's
Basketball	Basketball
Cross country	Cross country
Football	Golf
Tennis	Soccer
Track & Field (indoor)	Swimming & Diving
Track & Field (outdoor)	Tennis
	Track & Field (indoor)
	Track & Field (outdoor)
	Volleyball

=== Men's Basketball ===
The school's team has competed in the Big Sky Conference since 1970. The team's most recent appearance in the NCAA Division I men's basketball tournament was in 2000. The Lumberjacks are currently led by interim head coach Shane Burcar who replaced Jack Murphy.

=== Women's Basketball ===
The team has been coached by Loree Payne since 2017 and last won the Big Sky championship in 2006.

=== Cross Country ===
Big Sky Conference logo in Northern Arizona's colors

The team is head coached by Michael Smith. Since 2016, the Northern Arizona men's team is widely considered as the nation's leading program in the NCAA Division I. The team has been constantly ranked in the top 2 nationally of the USTFCCCA coach's poll since the start of the 2017 season. The team has dominated the Big Sky championship, winning 20 of the last 25 Big Sky team championships and 17 of the last 25 Big Sky individual titles as of 2017. The Lumberjacks won the NCAA Men's Division I Cross Country Championship in 2016, 2017, 2018, and 2020. The 2017 repeat title closed out a perfect season with a 53-point victory, placing five athletes in the top 40. The victory was the lowest score (74) at the NCAA Championships since 2014, and the Lumberjacks became the first repeat champions since 2013–14. Director of Cross Country and Track and Field Michael Smith earned the Bill Dellinger Award as National Men's Coach of the Year and also picked up both the Big Sky's Men's and Women's Coach of the Year awards. In track and field, Smith was named the US Track & Field and Cross Country Coaches Association (USTFCCCA) Mountain Region Women's Indoor Coach of the Year in 2017 and 2018.

=== Football ===
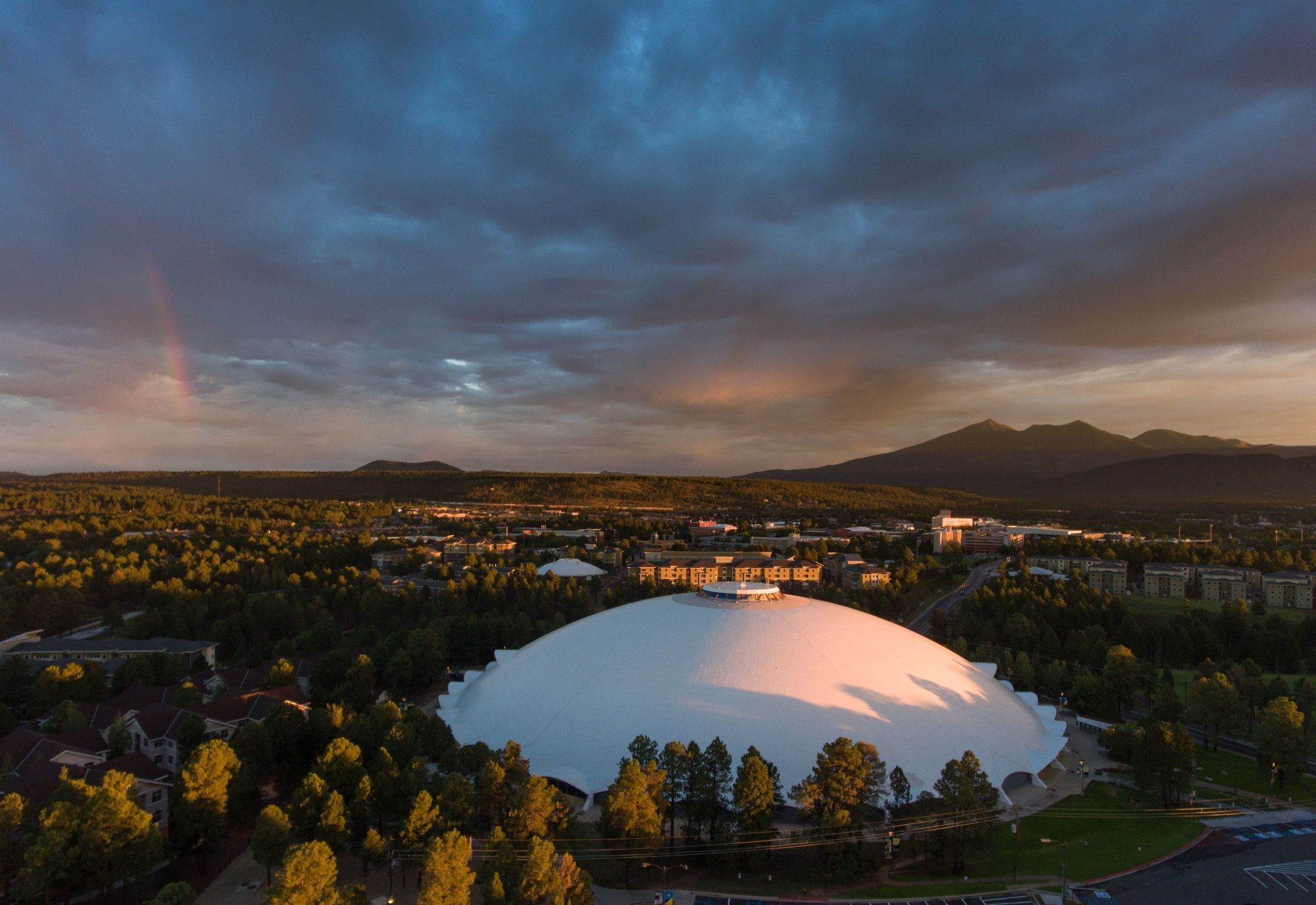
Walkup Skydome, home to the football team

The team competes in the NCAA Division I Football Championship Subdivision (FCS). The school's first football team was fielded in 1915. The team plays its home games at the 17,500 seat Walkup Skydome. They are head coached by Chris Ball.

=== Swimming and Diving ===
Northern Arizona competes as an affiliate member of the Western Athletic Conference.

- 8× WAC Champions: 2014, 2015, 2016, 2017, 2018, 2019, 2020, 2021

== National championships ==
=== NCAA team championships ===
Northern Arizona has won six NCAA D1 team national championships.

- Men's (6)
  - Cross country (6): 2016, 2017, 2018, 2020, 2021, 2022
- See also
  - List of NCAA schools with the most NCAA Division I championships
  - List of Big Sky Conference National Titles

==== Other national team championships ====
Below are 2 national team titles won by club sports teams at the highest collegiate levels in other non-NCAA competition:

- Men's (2)
  - Archery (recurve) (1): 2015
  - Archery (compound) (1): 2016

=== Individual national champions ===
==== Men ====
Athlete	Event	Year
Geordie Beamish	Mile	2019
Lopez Lomong	3,000 m, 1,500 m	2007, 2007
David McNeill	5,000 m (i), 5,000 m (o)	2010, 2010
Andy Trouard	3,000 m	2019
Abdihamid Nur	3,000 m, 5,000 m	2022, 2022

==== Women ====
Athlete	Event	Year
Angela Chalmers	Cross Country	1986
Ida Nilsson	Steeplechase, 5,000 m (i)	2004, 2005
Johanna Nilsson	Mile, 3,000 m, Cross Country	2003 & 2006, 2006, 2005
Karen Star	Swimming	2002, 2003, 2004

(i)=indoor track and field event
(o)=outdoor track and field event

== Club sports ==
=== Ice Hockey ===
The club hockey team competes in the American Collegiate Hockey Association at the Division II and III levels. The team was formerly in the NCAA Division I from 1981 to 1986.

- 1× Conference Champion: 2013

=== Team Tennis ===
The club tennis team competes in the USTA Tennis on Campus league and won the 2017 Spring Invitational national tournament.

=== Quidditch ===
The university also fields a club quidditch team, known as the NAU Narwhals, who compete in US Quidditch. The Narwhals advanced to the Elite 8 at IQA World Cup VI in 2013.

== Olympians ==
Athlete	Event	Year	Team
Brooke Andersen	Hammer	2020	United States
Maya Benzora	Long Jump	1984	Israel
Víctor Castillo	Long Jump	2004	Venezuela
Angela Chalmers	3,000 m	1988, 1992, 1996	Canada
Jordan Chipangama	Marathon	2016	Zambia
Diego Estrada	10,000 m	2012	Mexico
Samantha George	4 × 400 m	2000	Canada
Luis Grijalva	5,000 m	2020	Guatemala
Lopez Lomong	1,500 m, 5,000 m	2008, 2012	United States
Andrew Mavis	Basketball	2000	Canada
David McNeill	5,000 m	2012, 2016, 2020	Australia
Amin Nikfar	Shot Put	2008, 2012	Iran
Abdihamid Nur	5,000 m	2024	United States
Kristian Pettersson	Throws	2000	Sweden
Anna Söderberg	Discus	2000, 2004, 2008	Sweden
Georgina Toth	Hammer	2008	Cameroon
Anthony Wilson	200 m, 4 × 400 m	1992	Canada
Nico Young	10,000 m	2024	United States
