= Northern Colorado Bears =

- University: University of Northern Colorado
- Nickname: Bears
- NCAA: Division I (FCS)
- Conference: Big Sky (primary); Summit League (baseball); WAC (women's swimming and diving); Pac-12 (wrestling)
- Athletic director: Darren Dunn
- Location: Greeley, Colorado
- Varsity teams: 17
- Football stadium: Nottingham Field
- Basketball arena: Bank of Colorado Arena at Butler–Hancock Sports Pavilion
- Baseball stadium: Jackson Field
- Softball stadium: Gloria Rodriguez Field
- Soccer stadium: Jackson Stadium
- Other venues: Butler-Hancock Swimming Pool (swimming and diving)
- Colors: Blue and gold
- Mascot: Klawz the Bear
- Fight song: "UNC Fight Song"
- Website: uncbears.com
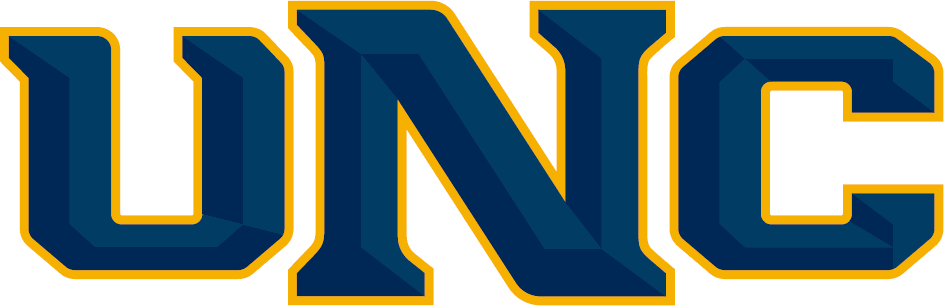

The Northern Colorado Bears are the athletic teams representing the University of Northern Colorado in Greeley, Colorado in intercollegiate athletics. The university sponsors seventeen teams including men and women's basketball, cross country, golf, tennis, and track and field; women's-only soccer, softball, swimming and diving, and volleyball; and men's-only baseball, football, and wrestling. The Bears compete in NCAA Division I, with the football team competing at the FCS level, and most teams are members of the Big Sky Conference. Three Northern Colorado teams have separate affiliations in sports that the Big Sky does not sponsor. The baseball team competes in the Summit League, the women's swimming and diving team is an affiliate member of the Western Athletic Conference, and the wrestling team will join the Pac-12 Conference in July 2026 after having competed in the Big 12 Conference.

== Sports sponsored ==
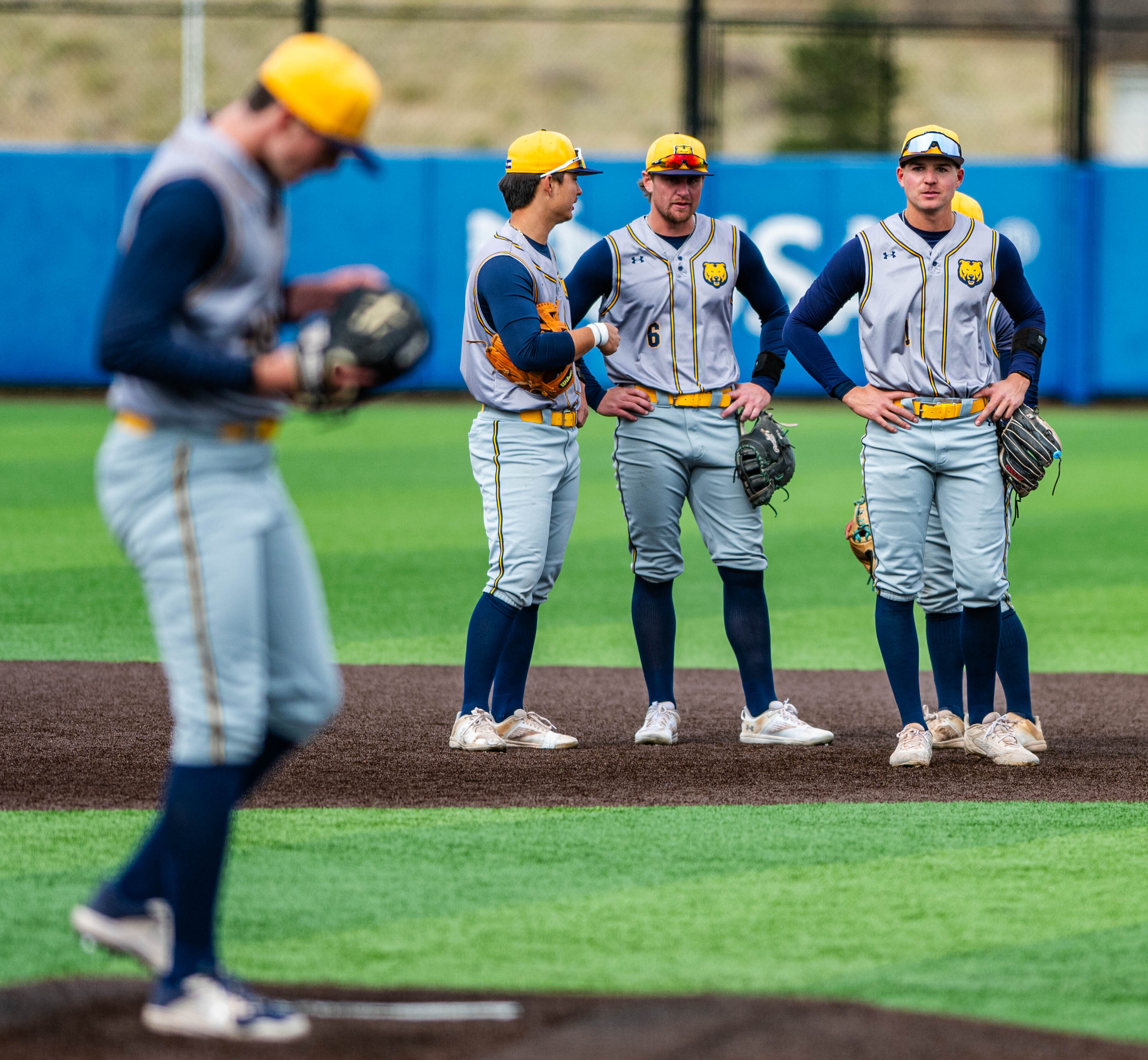
A Bears baseball game in 2026

=== Individual teams ===
Men's sports	Women's sports
Baseball	Basketball
Basketball	Cross Country
Cross Country	Golf
Football	Soccer
Golf	Softball
Track & Field	Swimming & Diving
Wrestling	Track & Field
	Volleyball

=== Football ===
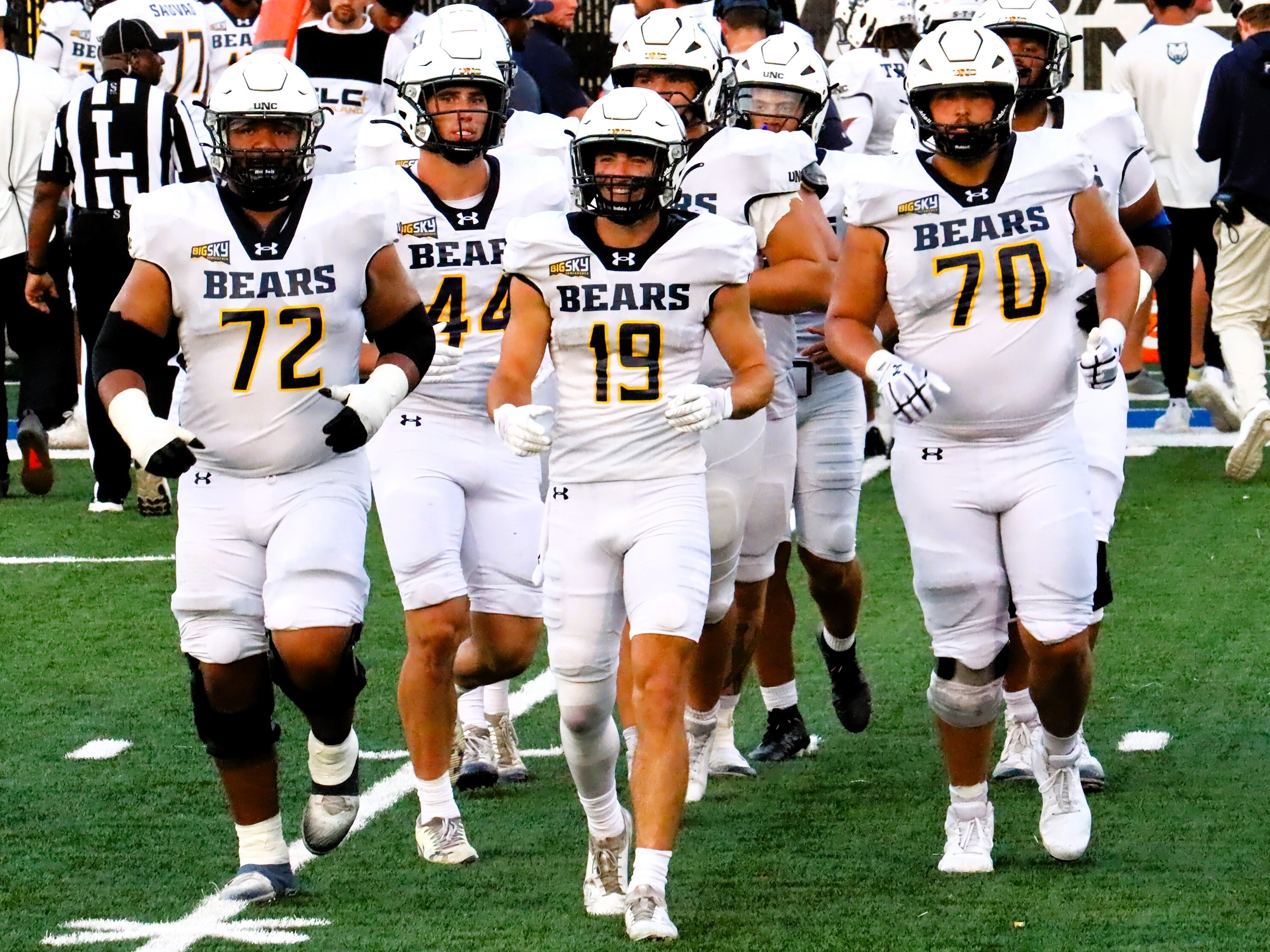
Bears football players during a game in 2025

The football program is the intercollegiate American football team for the University of Northern Colorado located in Greeley, Colorado. The team competes in the Big Sky Conference at the NCAA Division I Football Championship Subdivision (FCS) level. The university's first football team was fielded in 1893. The team plays its home games at the on campus 8,533 seat Nottingham Field.

Northern Colorado made two appearances in the NCAA Division II National Championship Game. The Bears defeated Carson–Newman (23–14 in 1996) and New Haven (51–0 in 1997).

Total national championships: 2

=== Softball ===
Big Sky Conference logo in Northern Colorado's colors

From 1969 to 1979, Northern Colorado participated in all of the first eleven Women's College World Series (WCWS) tournaments ever held and was the only team to do so.

The team compiled a WCWS record of 37–22 in those eleven years. In 1974, in its sixth trip to the tournament, the team reached the AIAW championship game (its fifth game in two days), only to lose to Southwest Missouri State by a score of 14–7. In 1976, the team advanced to the championship game, losing to Michigan State, 3–0. Two years later in 1978, the team reached the title game for the third time, falling to UCLA, also by a 3–0 score.

== Non-varsity sports ==
- University of Northern Colorado Rugby Football Club
