= Idaho State Bengals =

Intercollegiate sports teams of Idaho State University

- University: Idaho State University
- Nickname: Bengals
- NCAA: Division I (FCS)
- Conference: Big Sky Conference
- Athletic director: Pauline Thiros
- Location: Pocatello, Idaho
- Varsity teams: 15 (6 men's and 9 women's)
- Football stadium: ICCU Dome
- Basketball arena: Reed Gym
- Softball stadium: Miller Ranch Stadium
- Soccer stadium: Davis Field
- Other venues: Centennial Course
- Colors: Orange and black
- Mascot: Benny the Bengal
- Website: isubengals.com

Team NCAA championships
- 3

Individual and relay NCAA champions
- 19

The Idaho State Bengals are the varsity intercollegiate athletic teams representing Idaho State University, located in Pocatello, Idaho. The university sponsors thirteen teams including men and women's basketball, cross country, tennis, and track and field; women's-only golf, soccer, softball, and volleyball; and men's-only football. The Bengals compete at the National Collegiate Athletic Association (NCAA) Division I level (Football Championship Subdivision (FCS) for college football) and are currently a member institution of the Big Sky Conference.

== Sports sponsored ==
Men's sports	Women's sports
Basketball	Basketball
Cross country	Cross country
Football	Golf
Tennis	Soccer
Track and field†	Softball
	Tennis
Track & field†
Volleyball
† – Track and field includes both indoor and outdoor.

=== Football ===
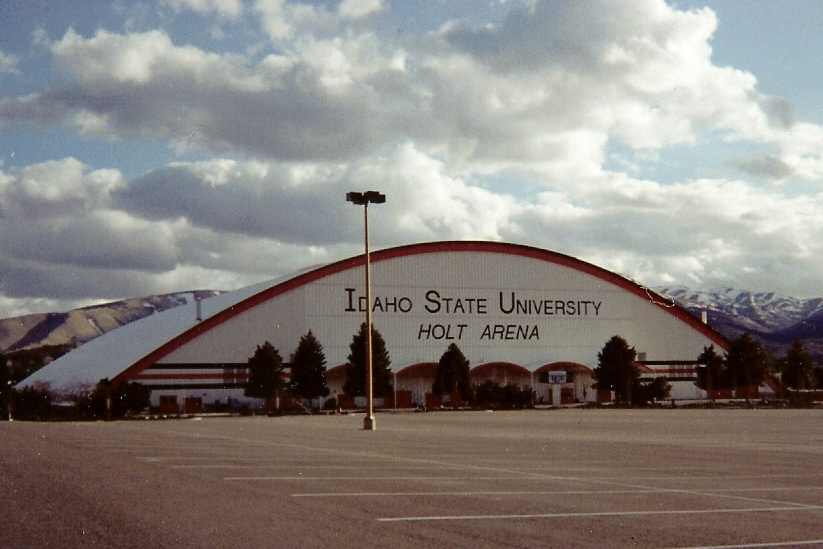
The ICCU Dome, which opened in 1970, is home to the Idaho State football and basketball teams.

In the 2009 campaign, Idaho State's football team boasted a one-win record, which was not an improvement over the 2008 campaign. ISU football's last winning season was the 2018 campaign, when they posted a record of 6–5. Previously they had not had a season above .500 since the 2014 campaign (8–4).

In October 2009, Idaho State University Director of Athletics Jeff Tingey announced that the contract of head football coach John Zamberlin would be extended for two more years, meaning Zamberin would be on the Bengals' sidelines manning the program through the 2011 season. Hired in late December 2006, Zamberlin's record at ISU was just 4–25. The decision was highly criticized by many students, faculty, and community members. The administration stood by their decision, citing an increase in athlete attendance in classes and graduation rates as a direct result of Zamberlin's coaching.

In 2010, the Bengals went 1–10 overall and 0–8 in the Big Sky Conference. Zamberlin was fired, and former Eastern Washington and Montana State coach, Mike Kramer, was hired.

Idaho State used to enjoy healthy rivalries with both the University of Idaho and Boise State University when all three schools were members of the Big Sky Conference. When both Idaho and BSU left the Big Sky in 1996 to move up to Division I-A, Idaho State University lost their main rivals, and Weber State of nearby Ogden, Utah became Idaho State's main rival. However, Idaho moved back down to Division 1-AA in 2018, resparking the rivalry between the two schools. Since 2018, they played an annual rivalry game nicknamed Battle of the Domes. Idaho State has won two out of the four games under the Battle of the Domes branding.

=== Basketball ===
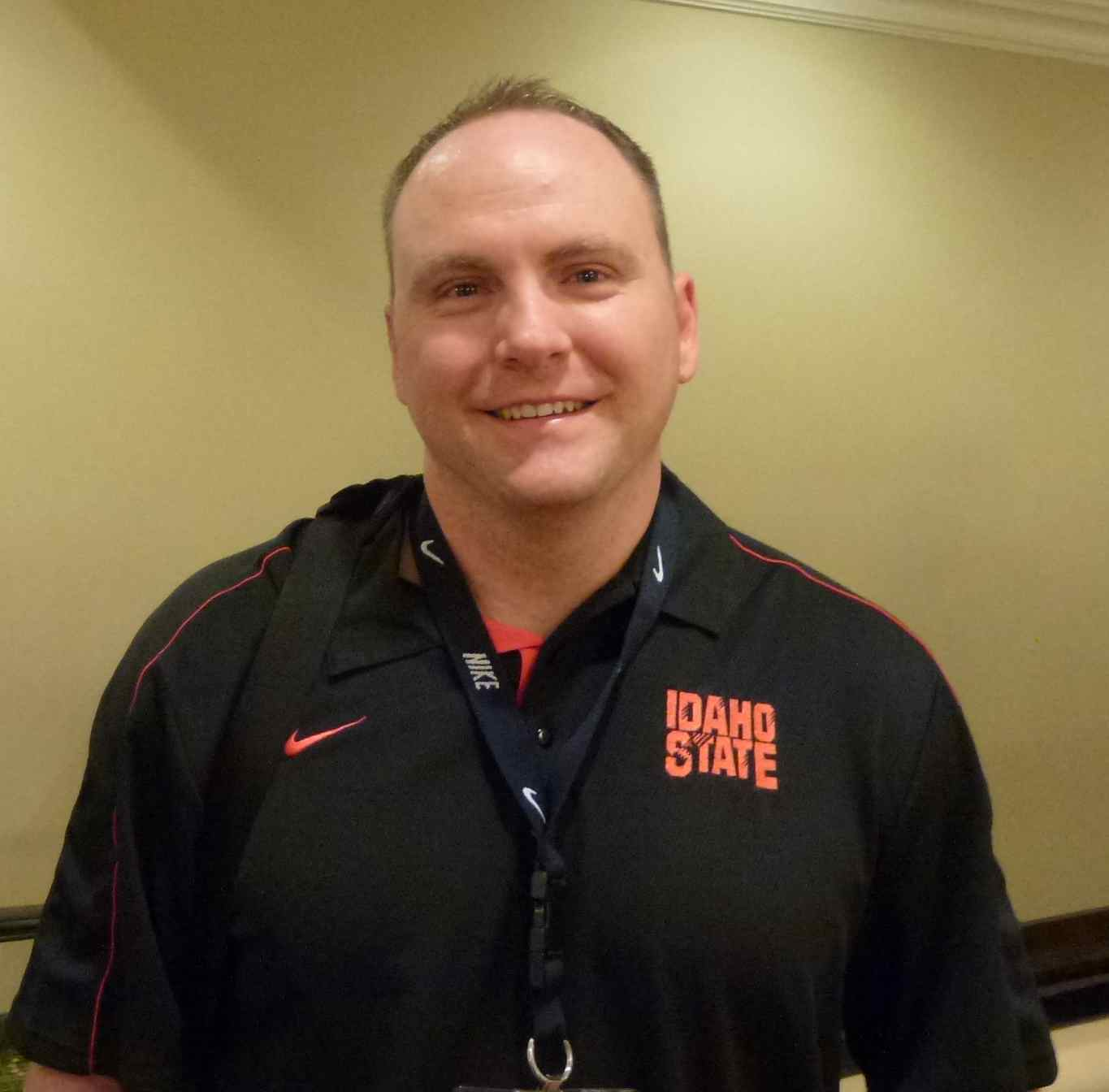
Seton Sobolewski, head women's basketball coach

In March 1977, the men's basketball team made national headlines by defeating the UCLA Bruins 76–75 in the West regional semifinal of that year's NCAA tournament. The win qualified the Bengals for their only appearance to date in the Elite Eight. This is by far the high-water mark for Bengals basketball, and marked the first time since 1966 that UCLA failed to reach the Final Four. The Bengals were subsequently eliminated in the West regional final by the UNLV Runnin' Rebels.

The men's basketball team plays their home games at the ICCU Dome (formerly known as Holt Arena), with a seating capacity of 8,000 for basketball. Their most recent appearance in the NCAA tournament was in 1987, when ISU was eliminated 70–95 in the first round by top-ranked UNLV.

==== Women's basketball ====
ISU's women's basketball team plays their home games at Reed Gym, which has a seating capacity of 3,040 for basketball. The most recent appearance of the women's team in the NCAA tournament was in 2021, when it was eliminated 71–63 in the first round by the Kentucky Wildcats. The women's program maintained an active rivalry in basketball with both Idaho and Boise State. In recent years, ISU has dominated UI, but in turn been dominated by BSU. Idaho State's women's basketball team most recently won the 2021 Big Sky Conference women's basketball tournament, beating their interstate rival Idaho in the final round.

== Fight song ==
Big Sky Conference logo in Idaho State's colors

"Growl, Bengals, Growl" is the official fight song of the university. It was created in 1948 by Jay Slaughter, Del Slaughter, and John Foreman when Idaho State became a four-year university. The song originated around 1921, attributed to Ralph Hutchinson and James Gardner for the Idaho Technical Institute, where Hutchinson was the athletics directory. Traditions include the football team singing the song after a win.

=== Lyrics ===
Growl, Bengals, growl!

Fight, Bengals, fight!

Gnash your teeth and bare your claws and drive with all your might!

Roar, Bengals, roar, you decide our fate!

Bring the vict'ry home to us, you Bengals of Idaho State!

I... S... U... I, S, U, Fight! ISU Fight! ISU Fight! Go! Go! Go Bengals, Go!

== Former sports ==
=== Baseball ===
The baseball program at ISU was discontinued 52 years ago after the 1974 season, following the Big Sky's decision to drop baseball and four other sports. The Bengals won the southern division in their final season, and met north champion Gonzaga in the best-of-three championship series in Pocatello. The underdog Bengals won the first game 6–4, but then lost a doubleheader delayed by snow, 14–3 and 13–0. Boise State and Idaho dropped their baseball programs six years later in 1980, citing budget constraints.

=== Wrestling ===
Idaho State won 8 Big Sky titles (1967, 1968, 1969, 1970, 1971, 1972, 1973, 1984) in wrestling, starting with its first in 1967; the sport was dropped by the conference 39 years ago, after the 1987 season.
