= SIU Edwardsville Cougars =

- University: Southern Illinois University Edwardsville
- Nickname: Cougars
- NCAA: Division I
- Conference: Ohio Valley Conference (primary); Mid-American Conference (wrestling)
- Athletic director: Andrew Gavin
- Location: Edwardsville, Illinois
- Varsity teams: 16 (8 men's and 8 women's)
- Basketball arena: Vadalabene Center
- Baseball stadium: Roy E. Lee Field at Simmons Baseball Complex
- Softball stadium: Cougar Field
- Soccer stadium: Ralph Korte Stadium
- Colors: Red and white
- Mascot: Eddie the Cougar, #57
- Fight song: Mighty Cougar Roar
- Website: siuecougars.com

The SIU Edwardsville Cougars are the intercollegiate athletic teams of Southern Illinois University Edwardsville (SIUE), located in Edwardsville, Illinois, United States. The Cougars' athletic program is a member of the Ohio Valley Conference (OVC) and competes at the NCAA Division I level. The SIUE mascot is Eddie the Cougar #57, and the school colors are red and white. Cougar teams have won seventeen NCAA national championships in five sports.

== History ==
SIUE entered intercollegiate athletic competition during the 1967–68 school year. At that time, college athletics was almost exclusively the realm of the male student athlete, but times were on the verge of change. On October 4, 1972, SIUE's first women's team took the field, as women's athletic director and coach Rosemarie Archangel's field hockey team played and won its first game. Field hockey has since been discontinued, and other sports have come and gone. In 2007, the university began the transition to Division I.

SIUE had competed in Division II, except in men's soccer, which competed in Division I from 1973 through 1995. From 1994 to 2008, the Cougars were members of the Great Lakes Valley Conference (GLVC) after having previously been an independent. As part of the move to Division I, the Cougars joined the Ohio Valley Conference (OVC) in 2008. The 2011–12 season was the Cougars' first campaigns for the OVC regular season titles, although they were not eligible for post-season play until 2012–13 except in softball and men's soccer, which were "fast-tracked" by the NCAA.

== Sports sponsored ==
A member of the Ohio Valley Conference, SIU Edwardsville sponsors teams in eight men's and eight women's NCAA sanctioned sports. SIUE is an affiliate member of the Mid-American Conference (MAC) in wrestling.

Ohio Valley Conference in SIU colors

Men's sports	Women's sports
Baseball	Basketball
Basketball	Cross country
Cross country	Soccer
Golf	Softball
Soccer	Tennis
Track and field^{†}	Track and field^{†}
Wrestling	Volleyball
† – Track and field includes both indoor and outdoor

=== Baseball ===
Roy Lee initiated the baseball program in 1967–68 and headed it for its first eleven years. In that time, he garnered a record of 237–144–3, leading his teams to 8 consecutive NCAA Division II playoffs and 3 Division II College World Series, with a runner-up finish in 1976.

After Coach Lee's retirement, the program was led by SIUE alumnus Gary Collins. In his 34 years as the Cougars' coach, Collins won 1028 games (with 766 loses & 7 ties). While still in Division II, his teams made 14 NCAA appearances and went to the Division II College World Series 5 times. He led them into Division I and the Ohio Valley Conference, where the Cougars completed their first season in the OVC with an overall record of 27–28 and a conference record of 13–14, which tied for fifth place in the ten team league.

On July 11, 2012, it was announced that Gary Collins would be making the transition from coach to the University's first Director of Development for Intercollegiate Athletics. The following day, it was announced that, after thirteen seasons as Collins' assistant, SIUE alumnus Tony Stoecklin was named acting head coach with the opportunity to earn the permanent job, and he then continued as the head coach.

In mid-April 2016, Tony Stoecklin was reassigned to other duties, and Danny Jackson was named interim head coach. At the end of the season, a national search was launched to find a new head coach. On June 16, two finalists for the job were announced: Missouri State assistant coach Paul Evans and Bradley associate head coach Sean Lyons.

=== Basketball ===
==== Men's ====
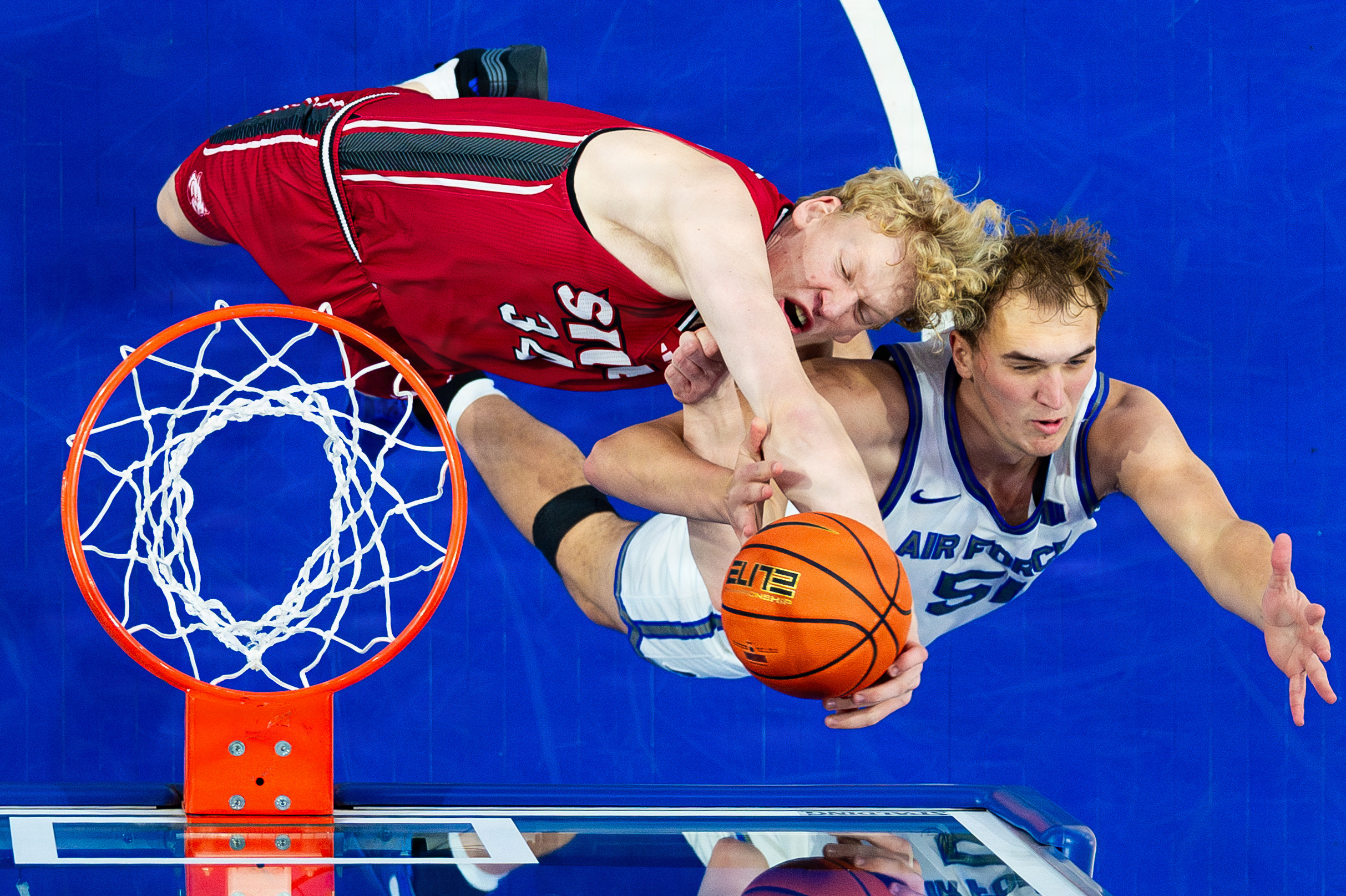
A game between the Cougars men's basketball team and Air Force in 2025

The Cougar men's basketball program was begun as a Division II program in 1967 by Naismith Memorial Basketball Hall of Fame coach Harry Gallatin who had no scholarships, inadequate facilities, and almost no money to work with. The program has since seen mixed success under 7 coaches, with the most successful having been Larry Graham (147–84 with 3 NCAA DII appearances in 8 seasons from 1984 to 1992) and Marty Simmons (88–59, 2 DII NCAAs in 5 seasons from 2002 to 2007).

Coach Lennox Forrester was in charge during SIUE's move from Division II to Division I and competing in the Ohio Valley Conference.

On May 4, 2012, it was announced that, following steady improvement, Coach Forrester's contract had been extended for three more years. On March 10, 2015, it was announced that, due to lack of success, Coach Forrester and his entire staff would not be retained.

Following a national search, it was announced on April 3, 2015, that Edwardsville native and California assistant Jon Harris was named the new head coach.

In March 2019 Brian Barone was named interim head coach, with the interim tag removed later that year. Barone led the Cougars to their first NCAA Division I men's basketball tournament appearance in 2025, winning the Ohio Valley Conference tournament as the 2 seed and receiving a direct draw into the "Big Dance" as the 16 seed in the Midwest Region.

==== Women's ====
The Cougars' women's program first took to the court in 1974 under Ina Anderson. For 29 of its first 34 seasons, it was guided by Wendy Hedberg who amassed a record of 470–361 and led her teams into the NCAA Division II tournament 5 times.

Coach Amanda Levens was in charge during SIUE's move from Division II to Division I and competing in the Ohio Valley Conference.

Picked by the OVC coaches to finish eighth of the eleven teams, the women's Cougars finished the 2011–12 season 12–4 in the conference and in third place. This and their 18–11 regular season record earned them an invitation to the Women's Basketball Invitational (WBI) tournament and earned OVC Women's Coach of the Year honors for Levens. On April 20, 2012, it was announced that Levens had resigned to accept the position of associate head coach at Arizona State University, her alma mater.

On June 13, 2012, it was announced that Bradley University head coach Paula Buscher had been named the new SIUE women's head coach.

=== Cross country and track and field ===
SIUE's men's cross country team initiated competition in the Fall of 1968, winning its first dual meet. The men's outdoor track and field team began a year later, coached by Jack Whitted and lost its first meet. And so did the programs muddle through for many years, with highs, lows, and a number of shining successes along the way.

When SIUE began to emphasize excellence in its athletic programs as much as in academics, the track and field program came of age. Between 2004 and 2008, when the move to Division I began, SIUE became an NCAA Division II powerhouse. In that short span, 16 men won 36 All-American awards, yet they were overshadowed by the Cougar women, with 15 winning 70 All-American certificates and capturing 6 individual National Championships.

Current coach Scott Block and former coaches Eileen McAllister and Kareem Jackson have not yet seen that level of success in Division I, but their athletes have toppled school records with regularity.

On September 17, 2013, it was announced that Jackson had followed his predecessor, David Astrauskas, to also become an assistant coach at Wisconsin, and that McAllister would be the interim head track and field coach, as well as the head cross country coach. At the end of the 2015 school year, with "interim" no longer on the Cougar's webpage, McAllister stepped down to focus on her family. SIUE alumnus and assistant coach Scott Block, a four-time All-American as a Cougar, was named as interim head coach with the "interim" quickly dropped for track and field but remaining for cross country.

In the 2013 outdoor season, long jumper La'Derrick Ward became the first Cougar athlete to qualify for the NCAA Division I Outdoor Championships. In the 2014 indoor season, both and triple jumper Jatavia Wright qualified for the NCAA championships, giving the Cougars representation in both the men's and women's competitions. On March 14, Ward finished 6th in the men's long jump and became SIUE's first Division I Track and Field All-American. The following day, Wright finished 11th in the women's triple jump and earned a spot on the All American second team.

For the 2014 outdoor season, Ward, Wright, and sprinter Braxton Klavins qualified for the NCAA championships, again giving the Cougars representation in both the men's and women's competitions. On June 11, Klavins finished 16th in the 400 meters, earning 2nd team All-American status. On the 12th, Ward placed 4th in the long jump, earning his second 1st team All-American certificate. On the 13th, Wright moved up from the 24th qualifier to 18th in the women's triple jump, just missing a repeat as 2nd team All-American but earning honorable mention on the All-America lists. All three were juniors and were eligible again in 2015. In 2015, Ward earned his 3rd consecutive outdoor All-American certificate with his sixth-place finish in the long jump.

In 2016. Julian Harvey was a second=team All-American with his 11th-place finish at the outdoor championships. Harvey broke two long-time conference records at the 2017 OVC Indoor Championships in winning both the long jump and high jump, with his long jump being #1 longest in the world for the year. At the NCAA Indoor championships, Harvey earned 1st Team All-American honors with his fifth-place finish in the long jump and 2nd Team honors with his 12th place high jump.

=== Golf ===
Bill Brick started the men's golf program in the spring of 1968. Although he had quick success, he soon left to further his own education. He was replaced by SIUE's first athletic director and basketball coach, Harry Gallatin, who remained at the program's helm for 24 years, leading his teams to the NCAA DII championships 19 times – including 6 top 10 finishes. Fourteen of his golfers earned 22 All-American awards or honorable mentions. Soon after Gallatin's retirement, the university decided to discontinue the program.

In 2005–06, the program was resurrected, with funding raised by friends and alumni, following the example of the support for the wrestling program (see below). SIUE alumni Mark Marcuzzo and Kyle Viehl, who had both played for Gallatin, were appointed head coach and associate. Marcuzzo left after that first season, replaced by Vielh who led the program into DI competition. When Viehl departed in 2010, he was replaced by current coach Derrick Brown.

Larry Bennett began the women's program in 1998–99. The team qualified to compete in the NCAA Division II East Regional five times, 2002–06. Jennifer Jakel was its 3rd coach from '06–07, leading the program into Division I and the Ohio Valley Conference, until leaving in July 2013.

On June 24, 2013, ground was broken for a new golf training facility. It is named the Harry Gallatin Golf Training Facility.

On July 29, 2013, men's coach Derrick Brown was named Director of Golf, making him the head coach of both the men's and the women's programs.

On February 28, 2016, Brad Hewitt, SIUE director of athletics announced that, as a result of the ongoing state of Illinois budget crisis, the Intercollegiate Athletics Committee needed to reduce the Department of Athletics budget by $200,000. To accomplish this, the man's tennis and women's golf teams would be eliminated.

=== Soccer ===
==== Men's ====
National Soccer Hall of Fame coach Bob Guelker came to SIUE in 1966 to start the men's soccer program. He had previously also begun the program at St. Louis University, where his teams won 5 NCAA titles, including the very first in 1959. As coach of the Cougars, he led them for 19 seasons, compiling a record of 216–67–21 and winning the very first Division II title in 1972 and the Division I championship in 1979 in their 14 NCAA tournament appearances.

Coach Guelker was succeeded by Ed Huneke, who remained for 22 seasons, building a record of 251–155–34 with 7 NCAA tourney appearances. In the mid-1990s SIUE had reluctantly moved from Division I to Division II, yet the move heralded a return to the NCAAs, including 3 Semifinals and a Division II runner-up finish. From 2007 through 2013, the program was headed by Kevin Kalish, who led it back into Division I, including competition in the Missouri Valley Conference.

On December 6, 2013, Scott Donnelly, Associate Head Coach since 2012, was named as the Cougars' fourth head coach. After leading the Cougars to an undefeated spring exhibition season, it was announced less than three weeks before the start of the 2014 regular season that Donnelly had been recruited away to a position with the U.S. Soccer Federation. He was replaced by seventh year goalkeepers coach Brian Jones and first year assistant coach David Korn, who were named co-head coaches. After a rough start to the season, the Cougars finished the MVC regular season as the runner-up to Missouri State. They then beat Bradley and Missouri State in the MVC Tournament, for the school's first MVC title and a spot in the NCAA Division I Men's Soccer Championship for the first time since 1982 and advanced to the second round.

Through 50 seasons, the men's teams have a record of 546–286–82.

Following a nationwide search by a committee that had former head coaches Kevin Kalish and David Korn as consultants, on January 27, 2015 Mario Sanchez, the associate head coach of the Louisville Cardinals was introduced as the Cougars fifth head coach.

It was announced on June 2, 2017, that the Cougars' men's soccer and wrestling teams would become an affiliate member of the Mid-American Conference beginning in the 2018 season.{ On June 8, it was announced that the soccer team would make the move for the 2017 season.

==== Women's ====
Begun in 1982, the women's program has been a consistent winner under 7 head coaches (or coaching combos), who have garnered a record of 331–209–50, with 5 appearances in the Division II NCAA playoffs and one in Division I. The program is currently headed by Derek Burton, who has taken it into Division I in the Ohio Valley Conference.

The 2014 women's squad tied for the OVC regular season title, earning the #2 seed in the conference tournament. After trailing 5th seed Jacksonville State 2–0 in the championship game, the Cougars scored two late goals to tie, then won in extra time to advance to SIUE's first NCAA Division I Women's Soccer Championship. At Lexington, the Cougars played Kentucky to a scoreless draw despite being heavily overmatched, but fell in a shootout 4–2 and ended the season with a record of 13–6–2.

=== Softball ===
The SIUE softball program, has seen only 2 head coaches in its history. Cindy Jones (376–201, 1975–88) and Sandy Montgomery (957–480–2 since 1989) have combined for a record of 1333–681–2 record through 2015, with 13 NCAA Division II appearances and one in Division I.

In 2007, SIUE won their last sixteen consecutive games of the season en route to the NCAA Division II softball championship, where they defeated Lock Haven University of Pennsylvania 3–2 in 12 innings (the longest championship game in history).

The 2011 Cougars completed their first full season of Ohio Valley Conference play with an overall record of 28–30 and an OVC record of 19–11, which took seventh place in the eleven team league, qualifying the Cougars for their first OVC Tournament.

The 2014 Cougars became the first SIUE team to win an OVC championship, beating the Murray State Racers 12–1 in six innings at Jacksonville, Alabama on May 10, also qualifying for the 2014 NCAA Division I softball tournament.

=== Tennis ===
Unlike some of the other coaches who started up Cougar sports programs, Kent DeMars at least had scholarships to offer when he began the men's tennis program in 1973–74. With these, he was able to put Cougar tennis on the map in short order, finishing 2nd in NCAA Division II in the team's first year of eligibility. This was followed by seven (7) consecutive DII National Championships.

Bob Meyers inaugurated the women's program in 1979–80 and found almost as much rapid success as DeMars, winning the first of four (4) consecutive NCAA DII Championships in 1986.

In 1986, Meyers also became head coach of the men's team, following DeMars' departure, and both teams have since mostly shared one coaching staff. Since coach Meyer's departure following the '89 women's title, the programs have seen mixed success and have not approached the success of the championship years.

Jason Coomer, the 8th coach for both the men's and women's teams has overseen the move to Division I and the Ohio Valley Conference and became men's coach only when Pratzel was promoted.

On May 6, 2014, after four years as assistant coach, Amanda Pratzel was promoted to head coach of the women's team, with Coomer retaining leadership of the men's team. In the season which had just ended, both teams qualified as the fourth seed for its first OVC tournament. In August 2015, Praetzel became the latest SIUE coach to be hired away by her sport's governing body, when she accepted the position as the United States Tennis Association's Missouri Valley Youth Pathway Manager the USTA's Kansas City office. Nick Mueller, the women's head coach at the University of Evansville was announced as the new SIUE women's coach on August 25, 2015.

On February 28, 2016, Brad Hewitt, SIUE director of athletics announced that, as a result of the ongoing state of Illinois budget crisis, the Intercollegiate Athletics Committee needed to reduce the Department of Athletics budget by $200,000. To accomplish this the men's tennis and women's golf teams would be eliminated.

=== Volleyball ===
Sandy Montgomery began the volleyball program in 1995 and coached for its first four years, guiding it to a record of 83–54 and its first appearance in the NCAA Division II tournament in 1998. Todd Gober led the program for a decade, with a record of 205–112 and 3 NCAA appearances in 2005–07 before beginning the transition to Division I. Leah Johnson became SIUE's 4th volleyball coach in 2011 as it began competition in the Ohio Valley Conference.

=== Wrestling ===
Larry Kristoff started the SIUE wrestling program in 1969 with resources similar to those available to soccer coach Bob Guelker, basketball coach Harry Gallatin, and baseball coach Roy Lee – next to none. He quickly developed one of the dominant Division II programs. In 30 seasons, his teams were consistently top competitors and won back-to-back-to-back NCAA Division II championships in 1984–86 and were runners-up in 1975 and 1987. Kristoff's program was initially unaffected when the university de-emphasized athletics in the mid-1980s, but went into decline after its championship years when the recruiting budget was repeatedly decreased despite the program's success.

Following the 2002–03 season, the SIUE administration decided to eliminate the wrestling program. A number of staunch supporters and alumni formed the Friends of Wrestling that has since raised monies from sources outside the university to maintain the program.

David Ray, the 4th coach since Kristoff's retirement was in charge as the program made the move to Division I and competition in the Southern Conference (the OVC does not sponsor wrestling) until it was announced on April 12, 2013, that he had tendered his resignation to accept a position in the university's administration.

On July 19, 2013, after a nationwide search, Cornell assistant coach Jeremy Spates, who had mentored Kyle Dake, Cornell's four-time national champion and the NCAA's 2013 Most Outstanding Wrestler, was named the new Cougar coach. At the conclusion of Spates' first season, senior David Devine won the Southern Conference heavyweight championship, becoming the first Cougar wrestler to advance to the NCAA National Championships since SIUE's move to Division I. In 2015, two Cougar wrestlers won SoCon titles, advancing to Nationals. Jake Tindle earned SIUE's first championship point as a Division I program after a win in the NCAA Tournament.

In 2017, Freddie Rodriguez (125), Jake Residori (174), and Jake Tindle (197) won SoCon championships and qualified for the NCAA National Championships in St. Louis, Rodriquez advanced to the quarterfinals before falling, and Residori placed 8th, becoming the first Cougar to earn Division I All-American status since 1987 and the first since SIUE moved to Division I in the 2012–13 season. SIUE finished 29th of the 69 schools in the championships.

It was announced on June 2, 2017, that the Cougars' men's soccer and wrestling teams would become an affiliate member of the Mid-American Conference beginning in the 2018 season.

=== Early shoestring budgets ===
As indicated in some of the prior sections. intercollegiate athletics at SIUE mostly began with very little in the way of funding. Although the programs competed in Division II from their beginnings, it was not until 1973, the year after the school had won its first NCAA championship, that the SIU Board of Trustees authorized the granting of 114 athletic scholarships and an additional 28 tuition waivers. Up until that time, the athletic department had only been able to offer about 50 student activity grants, while the Salukis at SIU Carbondale had 220 full NCAA scholarships.

=== Success and scandal ===
During the 1970s and early '80s the SIUE Cougars were extremely successful in several sports, winning multiple NCAA championships in men's soccer, wrestling, and both men's and women's tennis. In 1983, it was discovered that two men's tennis players who were both All-Americans and NCAA champions were "majoring in tennis" and neglecting to attend classes. It further came to light that the men's basketball coach had violated a number of the NCAA's restrictions on recruiting. While the tennis program was able to defend its string of NCAA Division II championships by winning their seventh title in a row in 1984, the university took the almost unprecedented action of suspending the men's basketball program for the 1983–84 season. Additionally, the athletic director was assigned to other duties within the university, with other actions against him held in abeyance, as he was a tenured faculty member. After these events, the university severely reduced funding to all athletics, and the overall program went into a period of decline.

== Athletic facilities ==
The following are among the athletic facilities used by SIUE Cougar teams:

- Ralph Korte Stadium & Bob Guelker Field "The Ralph" is a 4,000-seat outdoor stadium that serves as the home for men's and women's soccer and track & field programs. The playing field of FIFA-approved artificial turf is named for the Cougars' Hall Of Fame soccer coach (see above). In 2011, placement of a berm on the east side of the stadium was begun to provide seating on the grass. The stands at The Ralph is one of the places on the SIUE campus from where the Gateway Arch can be seen, 20 miles (32 km) to the southwest on the St. Louis riverfront.
- The Sam M. Vadalabene Center "The VC" is a multi-purpose facility that opened in 1984 and is the home for Cougars basketball, volleyball, and wrestling teams; it was host to the 1986 & '87 NCAA Division II wrestling championships. The VC contains a 4,000-seat arena, an indoor pool, classrooms, offices, and several activity areas. It is immediately adjacent to the Student Fitness Center which opened in 1993 and contains a wide range of recreation and fitness facilities. In 2008, as the school began its transition to Division I, the Vadalabene Center underwent a $6 million makeover. The renovation nearly tripled the number of chair back seats, increased the seating from 2,400 to 4,000, and added a new locker room, classroom, and office spaces. Since the renovation, the VC's largest crowd has been the sold-out crowd of 4,157, in attendance to see the Cougars men's basketball team play 10th ranked (in the USA Today/ESPN Coaches' Poll) Murray State, on January 21, 2012 in the Cougars' first nationally televised (on ESPNU) home game. This did not, despite expectations, surpass the crowd of January 8, 1987, when – with the fire marshal conspicuously absent – 4,392 avid fans managed to cram into the VC to witness the SIU Carbondale Salukis narrowly escape an upset at the hands of the then-Division II Cougars (final score, SIUC 84–SIUE 83 in overtime).
- Roy E. Lee Field at Simmons Baseball Complex is the home for the SIUE baseball program. The playing field is named for the coach who started the program (see above). Seating 1,500 spectators, the fully lighted stadium has an artificial turf playing field, and electronic scoreboard. The dugouts and locker rooms were newly constructed for the 2011 season.
- Cougar Field (aka Cougar Stadium) is the home to SIUE Softball. The stadium seats 500 in the stands and 300 more on the berm beyond the outfield fence. It is lighted for night games and has a locker room with showers and restroom, team meeting room, and training room to provide the Cougars with top-tier facilities. The Cougars and their visitors both have full dugouts. January 2012 saw the dedication of the new 110' x 110' (33.53m x 33.53m) Fulginiti Indoor practice facility located adjacent to the stadium.
- Cougar Tennis Courts located just to the west of the Vadalabene Center, feature six hardcourt surfaces with courtside chairback seating. They were opened on May 15, 1980, in time to host the NCAA's men's Division II national championship finals. The men's NCAAs returned in 1990, and the women's Division II championships were held on the Cougar Courts in 1982 & '89.
- SIUE Cross Country Course has permanently marked 5K, 6K, 8K & 10K courses that are 98% grass along their routes. The courses occupy a 10-acre site on University Drive just south of New Poag Road on the scenic SIUE campus. The courses have been host to numerous NCAA Division II Regional and conference championships and to IHSA regionals and sectionals.

== Athletic director ==
Tim Hall was named as the eighth director of athletics in University history on July 22, 2019, pending approval of the SIU Board of Trustees. Hall moves to SIUE with a great deal of experience as a Division I athletics administrator. He spent the past six years as Athletic Director for the Retrievers. of the University of Maryland Baltimore County. The three years prior to his tenure al UMBC, were spent in the same capacity for the Kangaroos of the University of Missouri Kansas City. He had earlier served in the athletic departments of Kent State University and Eastern Kentucky University. In the summer of 2017, Hall was named president of the Division I-AAA Athletics Directors Association (ADA), a professional organization composed of Division I athletics directors and administered by the National Association of Collegiate Directors of Athletics (NACDA).

Hall earned a bachelor's degree in sports administration from the University of Toledo and a master's degree in sports administration from Kent State University. He and his wife, Beth, have four children.

=== Legacy of AD Brad Hewitt ===
In August 2002, Assistant Vice Chancellor for University Relations Dr. Bradley Hewitt, an SIUE administrator since 1989, was appointed Director of Intercollegiate Athletics, the 7th in the school's history. With his appointment, Dr. Hewitt was assigned the twofold task of returning SIUE athletics to the glory of the 1970s & 80's, when the Cougars won 16 NCAA championships, and expanding that success through the entire spectrum of the university's athletic program. During the first six years of his term, SIUE sent Cougar teams or individual athletes to 48 NCAA Division II championship competitions. The Cougars earned 3 top-15 finishes in the U.S. Sports Academy Directors' Cup, and they twice won both the GLVC All-Sports Trophy and the Commissioner's Cup. And... in 2007, the softball team won the NCAA Division II National Championship – SIUe's first national title since 1989.

In the Fall of 2007, Dr. Hewitt was assigned new tasks – preparing Cougar athletics for entry into NCAA Division I competition and arranging for affiliation with a Division I athletic conference. The softball and men's soccer were able to be "fast-tracked" into Division I competition, with all other sports becoming full members of Division I in the Fall of 2012. Membership was secured for all but 2 teams in the Ohio Valley Conference in July 2008; in November 2008, the men's soccer team gained associate membership in the Missouri Valley Conference; in June 2011, the wrestling team was accepted as an associate member of the Southern Conference.

A 1981 mathematics graduate of Central Missouri State University (now the University of Central Missouri), Hewitt also earned his master's degree in athletic administration from CMSU in 1982 and received his Ph.D. in education from Southern Illinois University Carbondale in 1994; he is also a 2006 executive management graduate of the Sports Management Institute. Prior to coming to SIUE, he was an athletic administrator and coach at Morningside College (Iowa), SIUC, and CMSU. At SIUE, Dr Hewitt served as an assistant athletic director, acting CEO of the SIUE Foundation, acting Vice Chancellor of University Relations, adjunct professor in Kinesiology and Health Education, acting Alumni Director, as well as doing double-duty of Assistant Vice Chancellor for University Relations and Director of Intercollegiate Athletics.

After 22 of his thirty years at SIUE served in the athletic department, with the last seventeen years as athletic Director, Dr. Hewitt retired on June 30, 2019.

== Athletics and academics ==
As proud as Dr. Hewitt is of SIUE's athletic success, he and his successors, Tim Hall and Andrew Gavin, are even more proud of its academic success. Concerning the Cougars' Spring of 2023 achievements in continuing the program's more than seventeen years of academic excellence in spite of the challenges created by the COVID-19 pandemic, Gavin said, "SIUE Athletics has an impressive history of academic excellence, which is a testament to the commitment to our coaches as well as the collaborative spirit of our University faculty and staff. "This marked the 34th consecutive semester that the Cougar student-athletes posted a combined GPA of greater than 3.0, with an overall 3.303 GPA for the term. Student-athletes also finished with a GPA better than 3.3 for the twelfth semester. Of the Cougars' 16 teams, 15 earned a GPA over 3.0. Men's golf earned the department's top spot, with its second-best GPA since joining Division I of 3.637. Women's cross country was 3.548, followed by women's tennis at 3.520 to round out SIUE's top three programs. 42 percent of SIUE student-athletes earned Dean's List honors. For the entire 2022-2023 academic year, SIUE student-athletes earned a 3.305. while 14 student-athletes earned a perfect 4.0 for the semester, while seven earned a perfect 4.0 for the entire year.

On May 2, 2023, the NCAA's APR report (based on cumulative progress from 2018-1916 through 2021–22) showed that Cougar programs combined for an average APR score of 992, higher than the national average of 984 and two points higher than in 2022. Additionally, five SIUE programs, golf, softball, tennis, women's cross country and volleyball achieved perfect APR scores of 1,000.

In the NCAA's 2019 Graduate Success Rate (GSR) rankings, SIUE had five programs rated at 100%, and the school was ranked #2 in the OVC (behind Belmont), #13 of all public institutions nationally, and #1 among Illinois public universities.

== Mascot ==
The cougar was chosen as the university mascot in 1967, before any SIUE athletic teams ever took the field.

In February 1968, through the efforts of the Alpha Phi Omega service fraternity, the university acquired a young cougar that had been born at the San Diego Zoo the previous August and adopted by Thomas Blackshear. The cub, named Danie, was donated to SIUE by Blackshear's mother, Mrs. Nonette Lewis, following his untimely death. A “Name the Cougar” contest was held to rename the cub, and Mary Ann Kucinick won with the name, Chimega – the Apache word for cougar.

Chimega, possessed of a warm and patient personality, soon became the university's beloved mascot. She resided in a large cage just to the south of the University Center that was topped with a geodesic dome designed by visiting professor R. Buckminster Fuller. She was cared for by a student organization aptly named the Cougar Guard, who accompanied her on her twice-daily walks around the core campus and to a myriad of university activities, especially including athletic events. (In keeping with the times, the Cougar Guard was originally all-male, but eventually became co-ed.) Chimega mated in 1974 and bore two cubs, one stillborn, the second dying within hours. In the summer of 1982, having become less patient with people than she had always been, Chimega was retired from active mascot service. She died in March 1985 and was buried near the pond located east of the classroom building now known as Founder's Hall.

In January 1983, a second cougar, seven-month-old Kyna – Welsh for wise or graceful lady – became SIUE's second live mascot. Chimega's cage had been divided in two and a large, caged run would later be added. At one time, Kyna was released by pranksters/vandals. Later, she had severe health issues after eating a soccer ball. Due to liability insurance issues, she was restricted from interacting with the public in late 1986. Then, in June 1987, the university administration, without consulting students, staff, or alumni, donated Kyna to an exotic animal park. Despite protests, Kyna did not return, and SIUe has since been without a live cougar mascot.

In 2007, the university unveiled the bronze cougar statue in front of the Morris University Center, "a monument" to commemorate Chimega and Kyna.

In January 2010, Eddie the Cougar made his first appearance as the costumed SIUE mascot, replacing Corey the Cougar. Eddie has since made appearance at many campus events, wearing number 57, which commemorates SIUE's founding in 1957.

== Fight song ==
The Southern Illinois University Edwardsville Fight Song is "Mighty Cougar Roar." SIUE Music Department faculty members Dr. Kim Archer (composition) and Dr. Darryl Coan (music education) composed the song after SIUE entered Division I. It was introduced to the university and public in February 2011.

== Honors ==
=== NCAA National Championships ===
SIUE Cougar teams have won one NCAA Division I National Championship and 16 NCAA Division II National Championships.

==== Division I National Championships ====
Men's Soccer – 1979

==== Division II National Championships ====
Men's Soccer – 1972
Softball – 2007
Men's Tennis – 1978, 1979, 1980, 1981, 1982, 1983, 1984
Women's Tennis – 1986, 1987, 1988, 1989
Wrestling – 1984, 1985, 1986

=== Athletics Hall of Fame ===
The SIUE Athletics Department established its Hall of Fame in 2005 to honor outstanding athletes, coaches, teams, and other contributors to the SIUE athletic programs. Through the end of the 2020-21 school year, 130 individuals and 35 teams have been named to the Hall of Fame.

Teams

- 1972 Men's Soccer
- 1972 Baseball
- 1975 Wrestling
- 1975 Men’s Soccer
- 1976 Baseball
- 1977 Baseball
- 1977 Men's Soccer
- 1978 Men's Tennis
- 1979 Men's Tennis
- 1979 Men's Soccer
- 1980 Men's Tennis
- 1981 Men's Tennis
- 1982 Men's Tennis
- 1982 Softball
- 1982 Men's Soccer
- 1983 Men's Tennis
- 1983 Baseball
- 1983 Men's Golf
- 1984 Men’s Tennis
- 1984 Women's Tennis
- 1984 Wrestling
- 1985 Women's Tennis
- 1985 Wrestling
- 1986 Wrestling
- 1987 Wrestling
- 1988 Wrestling
- 1986 Women's Tennis
- 1987 Women's Tennis
- 1988 Women's Tennis
- 1989 Women's Tennis
- 1991 Baseball
- 2004 Men's Soccer
- 2005-06 Men's Basketball
- 2007 Softball
- 2008 Women's track and field *
- * = 2021 Inductees

=== All-Americans ===
Through the 2017–18 academic year, 211 SIUE athletes have earned 444 All-American awards. (Some athletes were honored in more than one year; tennis and track & field athletes can be honored for multiple events in a single season; some wrestlers earned both Division I & Division II awards in the same year.) In 2016–17, Cougar athletes were selected as All-Americans in softball, men's track & field, and wrestling.

== Club sports ==
There are also many student-run sports clubs at SIUE under the sponsorship of the Department of Campus Recreation.

Included are these competitive sports:

- Baseball
- Basketball (Men's & Women's)
- Bowling (Men's & Women's)
- Boxing
- Equestrian
- Football (Tackle)
- Ice Hockey
- Jiu-jitsu
- Powerlifting
- Soccer (Men's & Women's)
- Softball (Women's)
- Volleyball (Men's & Women's)
- Ultimate Frisbee
