= Michigan State Spartans =

Intercollegiate sports teams of Michigan State University

- University: Michigan State University
- Nickname: Spartans
- NCAA: Division I (FBS)
- Conference: Big Ten
- Athletic director: Dan Bartholomae
- Location: East Lansing, Michigan
- Varsity teams: (23 in 2021)
- Football stadium: Spartan Stadium
- Basketball arena: Breslin Student Events Center
- Baseball stadium: Jeff Ishbia Field at McLane Stadium
- Other venues: Munn Ice Arena; Jenison Field House (Wrestling)
- Colors: Green and white
- Mascot: Sparty
- Fight song: Victory for MSU
- Website: msuspartans.com

Big Ten logo in Michigan State's colors

The Michigan State Spartans are the athletic teams that represent Michigan State University. The school's athletic program includes 23 varsity sports teams. Their mascot is a Spartan warrior named Sparty, and the school colors are green and white. The university participates in the NCAA's Division I and the Football Bowl Subdivision for football. The Spartans participate as members of the Big Ten Conference in all varsity sports. Michigan State offers 11 varsity sports for men and 12 for women.

MSU's football team was consensus national champion in 1952, the (UPI) Coaches' national champion in 1965, and named national champion by different ratings groups in 1951, 1955, 1957, and 1966. They have also won the Rose Bowl in 1954, 1956, 1988 and 2014. Its men's basketball team won the NCAA National Championship in 1979 and 2000. The MSU men's ice hockey team won national titles in 1966, 1986 and 2007.

Alan Haller, who played football for the Spartans, was named the athletic director on September 1, 2021. Haller was fired on May 1, 2025.

== History ==
In 1925, the institution changed its name to Michigan State College of Agriculture and Applied Science, and, as an agricultural school, its teams were referred to as the Aggies. Looking to move beyond its agricultural roots, Michigan State held a contest to find a new nickname. They had decided to call the teams the "Michigan Staters". George S. Alderton, a local sports writer for the Lansing State Journal decided the name was too cumbersome and went through the entries to find a better and more heroic name. He decided on the "Spartans."

With a heroic name, the "Spartans" quickly caught on as the teams' new nickname. They later changed the lyrics of the Fight Song to reflect the name change of the College and its sports teams.

As the college grew, it looked to join a major collegiate conference. When the University of Chicago eliminated its football program after 1939, and withdrew from the Western Conference (now the Big Ten) in 1946, Michigan State president John A. Hannah lobbied to take its place. Despite opposition from the University of Michigan, the Big Ten admitted M.S.C. on May 20, 1949. After joining the conference, head coach Clarence L. "Biggie" Munn led the 1953 Spartan football team to the Rose Bowl, beating UCLA 28–20. Two years later, successor coach Hugh "Duffy" Daugherty carried the 1955 team to a second Rose Bowl and again defeated UCLA, 17–14.

== Sports sponsored ==
Men's sports	Women's sports
Baseball	Basketball
Basketball	Cross country
Cross country	Field hockey
Football	Golf
Golf	Gymnastics
Ice hockey	Rowing
Soccer	Soccer
Tennis	Softball
Track and field^{†}	Tennis
Wrestling	Track and field^{†}
	Volleyball
† – Track and field includes both indoor and outdoor.

Michigan State has 21 NCAA Division I-A varsity teams: 10 varsity sports for men and 11 for women. They participate in the Big Ten Conference except fencing, where until 1997, from the University founding, MSU featured fencing as a varsity sport.

During that time, MSU was coached by the first American recognized as a master of fencing, Charles Schmitter, for 45 years, from 1939 to 1984. Upon his retirement, his student, Fred Freiheit, coached from 1984 until fencing was demoted from varsity status in 1997. The Michigan State University Fencing Club is a competing member of the Midwest Fencing Conference, which consists of sixteen (16) schools with varsity or club programs.

=== Baseball ===
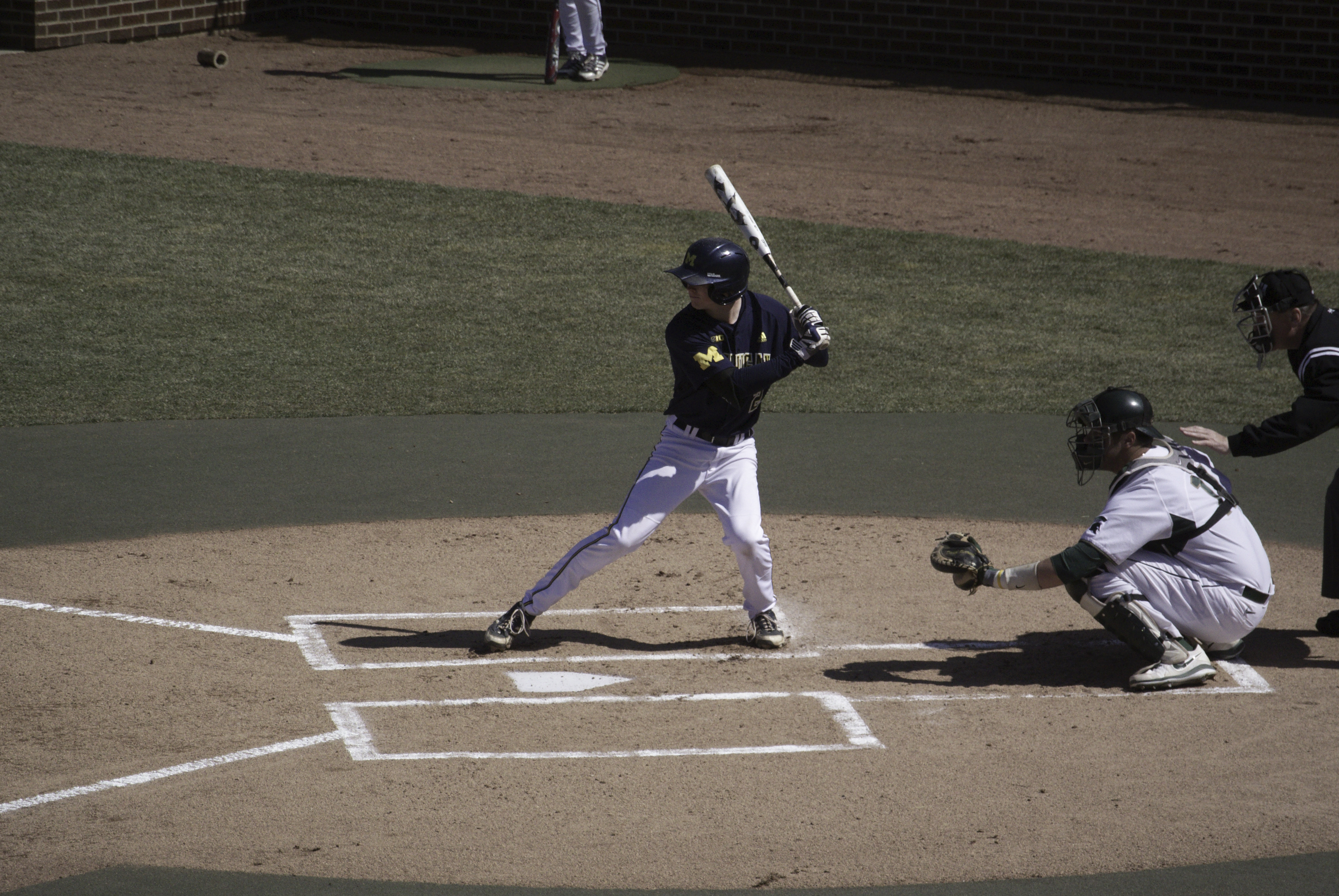
A Michigan State game in 2013

Beginning play in 1884, the Spartans have made the NCAA Division I Baseball Championship 5 times, advancing to the College World Series once, in 1954, with a third-place finish. The team has won 4 Big Ten conference championships and 5 Michigan Intercollegiate Athletic Association titles.

The program has featured a number of notable players, including Hall of Famer Robin Roberts, Tom Yewcic, the College World Series Most Outstanding Player of the 1954 College World Series, and several other players who'd advance to the major leagues, such as Kirk Gibson, Dick Radatz, Ron Perranoski, Steve Garvey, Rick Miller, and Mark Mulder.

Six Spartans have been named First Team All-American by the American Baseball Coaches Association - Tom Yewcic, C, 1954; Rob Ellis, OF, 1971; Ron Pruitt, C, 1972; Al Weston, OF, 1977; Kirk Gibson, OF, 1978; and Bob Malek, OF, 2002.

=== Basketball ===
==== Men's basketball ====
Retired Basketball Jerseys
Number	Player	Years
4	Scott Skiles	1982–1986
12	Mateen Cleaves	1996–2000
21	Steve Smith	1987–1991
23	Draymond Green	2008–2012
24	Johnny Green	1955–1958
24	Shawn Respert	1991–1995
31	Jay Vincent	1978–1981
32	Greg Kelser	1976–1979
33	Earvin "Magic" Johnson	1977–1979
42	Morris Peterson	1995–2000
Coach	Jud Heathcote	1976–1995

Michigan State's men's basketball team has won the National Championship two times: in 1979 and 2000. In 1979, Earvin "Magic" Johnson, along with Greg Kelser, Jay Vincent and Mike Brkovich, carried the MSU team to a 75–64 win against the Larry Bird-led Indiana State Sycamores. In 2000, three players from Flint, Michigan, Morris Peterson, Charlie Bell and Mateen Cleaves, carried the team to its second national title. Dubbed the "Flintstones", they were the key to the Spartans' win against Florida 89–76. In addition to the two Championships, the 2008–09 team reached the NCAA Championship game, but lost to North Carolina 89–72.

Since 1995, Michigan State has been coached by Tom Izzo, who has a 606–231 record through April 5, 2019. Izzo's coaching helped the team make six of twelve NCAA Final Fours from 1999 to 2010, winning the title in 2000 and leading ESPN to define MSU as the best team in that decade. Michigan State basketball has been selected for 22 consecutive NCAA tournament bids under Izzo. The Spartans have won one NCAA Championship, nine Big Ten Regular Season Championships, and six Big Ten tournament championships (the most of any team in the Big Ten) under Izzo. The team has made two NCAA Championship games and advanced to eight Final Fours, 10 Elite Eights, and 14 Sweet Sixteens under Izzo.

Overall, Michigan State has won two NCAA Championships, 15 Big Ten Regular Season Championships, and six Big Ten tournament Championships. The Spartans have appeared in three NCAA Championship games, 10 Final Fours, 14 Elite Eights, 20 Sweet Sixteens, and made 30 NCAA Tournament appearances.

Spartans formerly or currently in the NBA include Adreian Payne, Deyonta Davis, Bryn Forbes, Denzel Valentine, Maurice Ager, Alan Anderson, Charlie Bell, Shannon Brown, Mateen Cleaves, Paul Davis, Terry Furlow, Jamie Feick, Draymond Green, Johnny Green, Gary Harris, Earvin "Magic" Johnson, Greg Kelser, Mike Peplowski, Morris Peterson, Zach Randolph, Shawn Respert, Jason Richardson, Scott Skiles, Steve Smith, Eric Snow, Sam Vincent, Jay Vincent, and Kevin Willis.

==== Women's basketball ====
MSU also has a fairly successful women's basketball team, with its greatest accomplishment being a national runner-up finish to Baylor in 2005. MSU's women's basketball started in 1972–73 under coach Mikki Baile. The women's team has had five coaches in its history. The Spartans current coach is Robyn Fralick. The Spartans have made one National Championship game, one Final Four, one Elite Eight, three Sweet Sixteens, and appeared in 15 NCAA/AIAW Tournaments.

=== Football ===
Rose Bowls
1954	Michigan State	28	UCLA	20
1956	Michigan State	17	UCLA	14
1966	UCLA	14	Michigan State	12
1988	Michigan State	20	Southern California	17
2014	Michigan State	24	Stanford	20

Football has a long tradition at Michigan State. Starting as a club sport in 1884, football gained varsity status in 1896. During that time, the Spartans had a roster of impressive players, including Lynn Chandnois, Dorne Dibble, Meredith Assaly, and Don McAulliffe. In 1951, the Spartans finished the season undefeated, and performed the same feat the following year in addition to the nation's longest winning streak of 24 games. The team was named the "undisputed national champions by every official poll".

After waiting for several years, the team was finally admitted into the Big Ten Conference as a regular member in 1953. They promptly went on to capture the league championship (losing only one game during the season) and beating UCLA in their first Rose Bowl game. After the 1953 season Biggie Munn, the legendary Spartan coach, turned the team over to his protégé and future legend Duffy Daugherty. Daughtery went on to win the 1956 Rose Bowl. George Perles was the head coach when the Spartans defeated USC in the 1988 Rose Bowl.

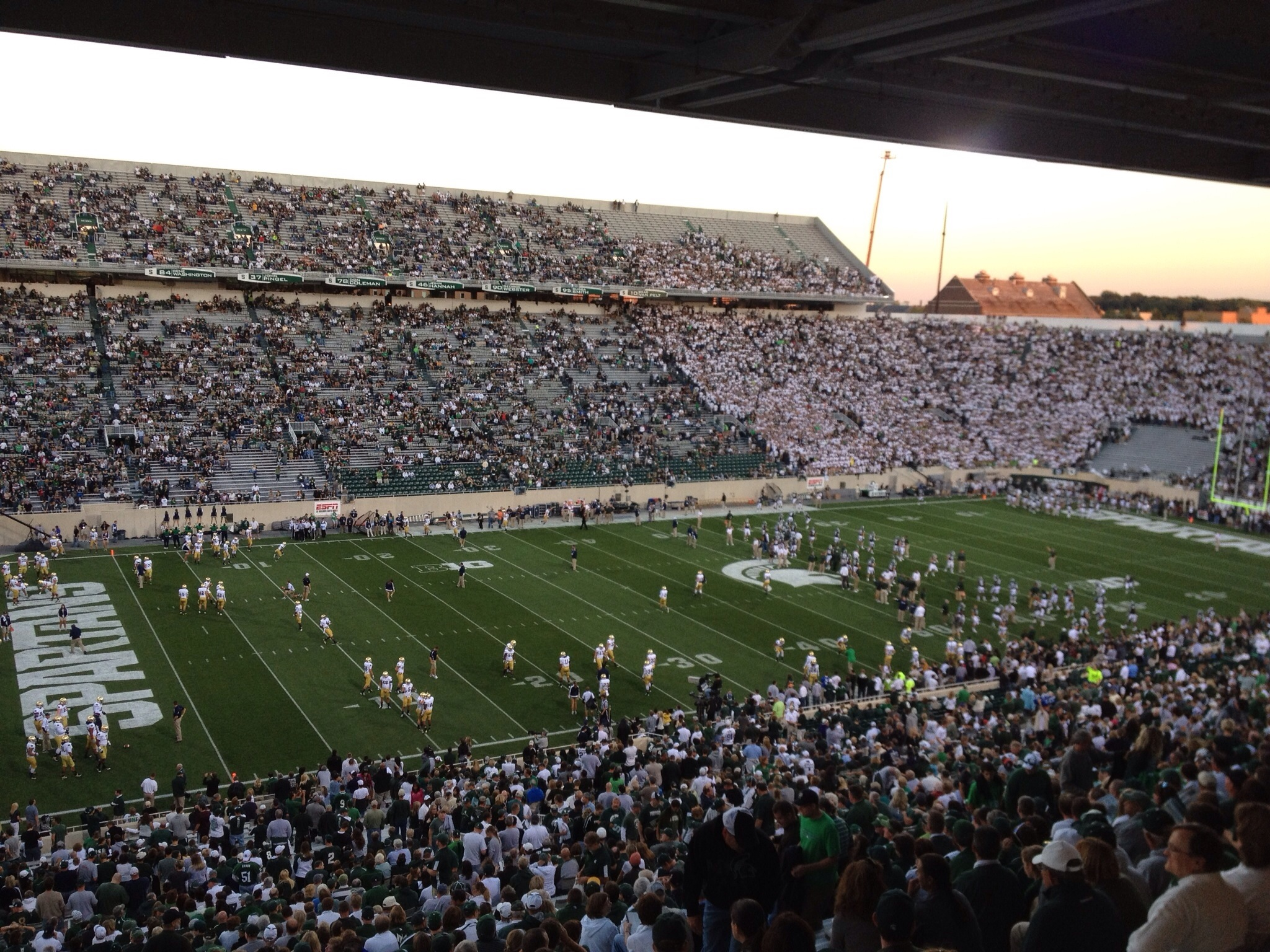
Michigan State v Notre Dame game in 2012

The current coach is Pat Fitzgerald, who was hired on December 1, 2025. His predecessor Jonathan Smith (American football coach)amassed a 4–15 record in his coaching tenure before being fired due to a poor showing in the 2025 Michigan State season, amassing a record of 4–8 overall and 1–8 within the Big Ten Conference.

Under Mark Dantonio, MSU has won three Conference Championships, 2010, 2013, and 2015. The Spartans have won three Big Ten Divisional championships and two Big Ten Championship games during that period. In 2015, MSU was selected for the College Football Playoff as the No. 3 seed, but lost to Alabama in the Cotton Bowl. He also led the Spartans to a victory in the 2014 Rose Bowl, the 100th edition of the "Grandaddy of them all".

All told, Michigan State has won six national championships and nine Big Ten championships.

Today, the football team competes in Spartan Stadium, a renovated 75,005-person football stadium in the center of campus.

MSU's traditional archrival is Michigan, against whom they compete for the Paul Bunyan Trophy; MSU has a 29–41–2 record in the annual trophy game. The Spartans have lost the trophy five of the past eight years, as of the 2024 season.

Michigan State's rivalry game against Notre Dame, with whom they compete for the Megaphone Trophy was played every year until 2013. MSU's record in the trophy series against the Fighting Irish is 27–33–1.

Notable MSU alumni who have played in the National Football League include Morten Andersen, Plaxico Burress, Andre Rison, Derrick Mason, Muhsin Muhammad, T. J. Duckett, Flozell Adams, Julian Peterson, Herb Haygood, Charles Rogers, Jim Miller, Earl Morrall, Wayne Fontes, Bubba Smith, Tony Banks, Percy Snow, Rob Fredrickson, Jeff Smoker, Tony Mandarich, Lorenzo White, Hank Bullough, Drew Stanton, Devin Thomas, Tupe Peko, Domata Peko, Chris Morris, Greg Montgomery, Paul Edinger, Javon Ringer, Chris L. Rucker, Chris Baker, Sedrick Irvin, Eric Smith, Greg Jones, Brian Hoyer, Garrett Celek, Jack Conklin, Shilique Calhoun, Bennie Fowler, Will Gholston, Keith Mumphery, Max Bullough, Donavon Clark, Joel Heath, Jeremy Langford, Darqueze Dennard, Dion Sims, Tony Lippett, Lawrence Thomas, Kellen Davis, Trae Waynes, Jerel Worthy, Connor Cook, Aaron Burbridge, Kirk Cousins, Le'Veon Bell, and Kenneth Walker III.

=== Cross country ===
Historically, the Michigan State Cross Country men's team has been one of the school's most successful programs. Between World War I and World War II, Michigan State College competed in the Central Collegiate Conference, winning titles in 1926–1929, 1932, 1933 and 1935. Michigan State also experienced success in the IC4A, at New York's Van Cortlandt Park, winning 15 team titles (1933–1937, 1949, 1953, 1956–1960, 1962, 1963 and 1968). Since entering the Big Ten in 1950, Michigan State has won 14 men's titles (1951–1953, 1955–1960, 1962, 1963, 1968, 1970 and 1971). Michigan State hosted the inaugural NCAA cross country championships in 1938 and every year thereafter through 1964 (except a one-year vacation in 1943 due to war). The Spartans won eight NCAA championships from 1930 to 1959, including 1939, 1948, 1949, 1952, and 1955–1959 (minus 1957). Walt Drenth is the current director of both the men's and women's cross country and track and field programs. After joining MSU in 2004, Drenth led the men's cross country team to an NCAA Championship bid during the 2004 season. The women's cross country team also advanced to the NCAA Championship Meet after winning the Great Lakes Regional race.

=== Ice hockey ===
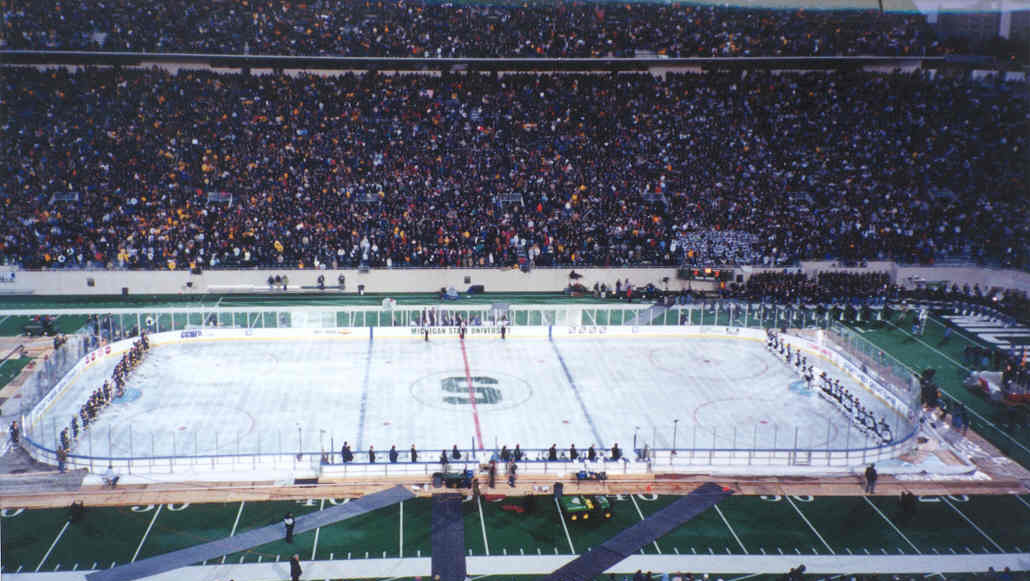
"The Cold War"

Michigan State has two varsity hockey teams: a men's ice hockey team and a women's field hockey team. Helen Knull is the head coach of the women's field hockey team.

The men's ice hockey team plays at the Munn Ice Arena. The head coach was Rick Comley, who had a 116–73–19 record at MSU. The current head coach is Adam Nightingale. In the 2013–2014 campaign, the Big Ten Conference debuted Division I ice hockey, (Michigan State formerly competed in the Central Collegiate Hockey Association with Big Ten sister schools University of Michigan (U-M) and the Ohio State University).

On October 6, 2001, the team was involved in what was then the most-attended hockey game in history: The Cold War. The Spartans set up a hockey rink in the middle of their football stadium, Spartan Stadium, and played U-M before a crowd of 74,554. The game ended in a 3–3 tie. A decade later, the same two teams were again involved in the most-attended ice hockey game in history. This time, Michigan hosted the rivalry game at its Michigan Stadium. The Big Chill at the Big House set the current record with an officially certified crowd of 104,173.

The MSU ice hockey program has seven CCHA regular season championships, 11 CCHA Tournament titles, 1 Big Ten Conference regular season championship, and 1 Big Ten Tournament title. MSU has also won 11 Great Lakes Invitational titles. The Spartans have been in the NCAA tournament 23 times, with nine Frozen Four appearances and three national titles (1966, 1986 and 2007). On April 7, 2007, the Michigan State Spartans won their third Collegiate Championship by beating the Boston College Eagles 3–1.

Former Michigan State players in the National Hockey League include Rod Brind'Amour, Anson Carter, Duncan Keith, Donald McSween, Adam Hall, John-Michael Liles, Torey Krug, Shawn Horcoff, Justin Abdelkader, Jim Slater, brothers Kelly Miller and Kip Miller, as well as their cousins, brothers Ryan Miller and Drew Miller. Two players for MSU have won the Hobey Baker Award: Kip Miller in 1990 and Ryan Miller in 2001. Few other players also excelling in other leagues including forward Brock Radunske and defenseman Brad Fast.

=== Softball ===
The MSU women's fastpitch softball team won the 1976 Women's College World Series to take the AIAW national title, the only team east of the Mississippi River to win the WCWS until Michigan did it in 2005. (Carol Hutchins played shortstop for that 1976 team, and would coach the Wolverines to the title 29 years later.) The team has appeared in six Women's College World Series, in 1973, 1974, 1975, 1976, 1977 and 1981. Jacquie Joseph, coached the program from 1994 to 2022. Since taking over the program, Joseph has helped bring MSU to a record of 668–677–1 and four NCAA Regional appearances. The current head coach is Sharonda McDonald-Kelley

=== Wrestling ===
Wrestling was one of the earliest sports formed at the Michigan Agricultural College, being established in 1886. While the sport was dropped in 1906, it was reformed by the college 16 years later in 1922. The wrestling team competes on campus at Jenison Field House, which has a capacity of 6,000 people. The Spartan wrestling team were the NCAA Division I Team Champions in 1967. Its current coach head coach is Roger Chandler. Prior to Chandler becoming head coach, their head coach for 25 years was Tom Minkel who produced 33 All-Americans, 11 Big Ten Champions, and one NCAA Champion. Former Spartan Wrestlers who have gone on to become UFC fighters include Bobby Nash, Gray Maynard, and Rashad Evans. Evans is a former UFC Light Heavyweight Champion and 2019 inductee into the UFC Hall of Fame.

Starting in the mid-2000s, the Spartan wrestling team started to see declines in team success. From 2004 to 2018, the team had one season better than .500, going 7–6 in 2005. However the team would have wrestlers see individual success during this time, including four-time All-American Nick Simmons, and three-time All-American and 2009 NCAA Champion Franklin Gómez. On the international circuit, Gómez was a 2011 World silver medalist and a three-time Olympian at the 2012, 2016 and 2020 Summer Olympics.

Michigan State University Spartan wrestling team accomplishments:

- 1 NCAA Division I Wrestling Team Title (1967)
- 8 Big Ten Conference Team Titles (1961, 1966, 1967, 1968, 1969, 1970, 1971, 1972)
- 68 individual Big Ten Conference Champions dating back to 1951
- 8 Top-ten team finishes at the NCAA Championships
- 25 individual NCAA Champions dating back to 1936
- 100+ All-Americans dating back to 1931

=== Other varsity sports ===
MSU has a number of other team sports. As in many other NCAA institutions, Michigan State has a baseball team for men and a softball team for women. Jake Boss Jr. is head coach of the MSU baseball team. Former Michigan State players in Major League Baseball include Kirk Gibson, Steve Garvey, Robin Roberts and Mark Mulder. Since 2007, the baseball team plays a popular annual exhibition game against the nearby minor-league Lansing Lugnuts.

The Spartans also have a men's soccer team, which won two national championships, in 1967 and 1968, sharing titles with Saint Louis and Maryland respectively. Michigan State soccer began play in 1956, defeating arch-rival Michigan 3-1 at Old College Field in East Lansing in the program's first ever game as a varsity sport. The men's soccer team battles Michigan annually in the Big Bear Trophy game, a series in which the Spartans lead against their in-state rival. Coaching the women's soccer team is Jeff Hosler.

There is also a volleyball team; Leah Johnson is the current head coach of the women's volleyball team since 2022. Cathy George was the previous head coach, holding the programs winningest record of 302-233. During her first year at Michigan State, George led her team to a 12–18 record, including a 5–15, ninth-place finish in the conference standings. George went on to lead the Spartans to 10 NCAA tournament appearances.

There are a number of contact sports at MSU, including boxing and wrestling. MSU's boxing team won national titles in 1951 and 1955, although it is no longer an NCAA varsity sport.

Water sports at MSU include rowing. MSU's women's rowing coach is Stacey Rippetoe, who is in her first year as the Spartan crew coach. Former coach, Matt Weise, in his third year as MSU head coach, coached the Spartans to a program-best sixth-place team finish at the NCAA Championship. Matt Gianiodis was the head coach of both men and women's swimming and diving. In his tenure as head coach, Spartan swimmers and divers have broken 14 varsity records.

Other sports at MSU include golf, gymnastics and tennis. Golf has had a long tradition at MSU. Hall of Fame Coach Bruce Fossum helped carry MSU to its first Big Ten title in 1969. The Big Ten title would elude the Spartans until 2005, when arguably, the best team ever assembled, took home the rings in stellar fashion. Not only did the Spartans win the Big Ten Championship in 2005, but they captured two other titles along the way and rose all the way to #5 in the U.S. Casey Lubahn coaches the men's golf team. A former assistant coach at Stanford University, this is his fourth year as a head coach.

Stacy Slobodnik-Stoll coaches the women's team. In the last ten seasons, she has brought the Spartans to nine straight NCAA regional appearances. Spartan women golfers won individual collegiate national championships on two occasions: Joyce Kazmierski in 1966 and Bonnie Lauer in 1973.

The men's gymnastics team at MSU won one national title, which they shared with the University of Illinois at Urbana–Champaign in 1958. In 2001, the MSU Board of Trustees disbanded the team in order to comply with Title IX regulations. The women's team retained its varsity status. In 2008, the team ranked 17th in the nation in the final season standings, the highest placement in program history.

Harry Jadun is the current coach of the men's tennis program. Gene Orlando was the coach of the men's tennis team. In his 26 years as MSU head coach, Orlando took the Spartan men to four NCAA Championships and had a team in 2016 reach the Final Four of the NCAA Tournament Doubles. Coaching the women's team is Kim Bruno, who is in her 4th season at the helm.

== Notable non-varsity sports ==
=== Rugby ===
The Michigan State University Rugby Football Club was founded in 1964. Michigan State rugby has been steadily improving in college rugby in recent years. During the 2010–11 season, the Spartans played in Division 2, finishing with a 10–3 record and qualifying for the playoffs. The Spartans' success led to them moving up to Division 1–AA for the 2011–12 season. For the 2012–13 season, the Spartans once again moved to a higher level of competition—the Big Ten Universities D1–A conference, against traditional Big Ten rivals such as the University of Michigan and Ohio State University. The success of Spartan Rugby is greatly attributed to former head coach Dave Poquette, who had been coaching at Michigan State since 1992 and retired in 2013.

=== Water Polo ===
The Michigan State University Water Polo Club was founded and officially recognized November 17, 1967. At the time of its inception, the team played in the Midwest Collegiate Water Polo Association, along with Iowa, Indiana, Michigan, Ohio State, Loyola, Drake, and Western Michigan. Now competing in the Big Ten division of the Collegiate Water Polo Association, Michigan State is joined by Michigan, Iowa, Indiana, Northwestern, Wisconsin, Purdue, and Illinois, with Ohio State moving to the Great Lakes Intercollegiate Athletic Conference. After winning back-to-back Big Ten championships in 1993 and 1994, the Spartans would go the next half a decade without a Big Ten Championship. With another conference championship, the Spartans would go on to win their first national collegiate club championship in 2000. Michigan State would continue to enjoy much success in the 2000s, winning the Big Ten Championship in 2002 and from 2005 to 2010. This included an impressive four year stretch which included the Spartan's second and third national championships in 2006 and 2008, and runner-up finishes for the national title in 2005 and 2007, as well as a third-place finish in 2010. In 2014, the Spartans would stage a comeback in the final two minutes of regulation to upset Michigan in the Big Ten title game for their eleventh Big Ten Championship, and their seventh in ten years.

== MSU Athletics Hall of Fame ==
In 1992, thirty former Spartan athletes, coaches, and administrators were inducted into the MSU Athletics Hall of Fame as its charter class. On October 1, 1999, the University opened its new Athletics Hall of Fame, in the Clara Bell Smith Student-Athlete Academic Center.

== Awards ==
See footnote

== Academic All-Americans ==
See footnote

== Championships ==
=== NCAA team championships ===
Michigan State has won 20 NCAA team national championships.

- Men's (19)
  - Basketball (2): 1979, 2000
  - Boxing (2): 1951, 1955
  - Cross Country (8): 1939, 1948, 1949, 1952, 1955, 1956, 1958, 1959
  - Gymnastics (1): 1958 (co-champions)
  - Ice Hockey (3): 1966, 1986, 2007
  - Soccer (2): 1967 (co-champions), 1968 (co-champions)
  - Wrestling (1): 1967
- Women's (1)
  - Cross Country (1): 2014
- See also:
  - List of NCAA schools with the most NCAA Division I championships
  - Big Ten Conference NCAA national team championships

=== Other national team championships ===
Below are 10 national team titles that were not bestowed by the NCAA.

- Men's (9)
  - Football (6): 1951, 1952, 1955, 1957, 1965, 1966
  - Rifle (3): 1914, 1916, 1917
- Women's (1)
  - Softball (1): 1976
- See also:
  - List of Big Ten Conference National Championships
  - List of NCAA schools with the most Division I national championships

== NCAA Division I Directors' Cup ==
See footnote and NACDA Directors' Cup

Year	Rank: National	Rank: Big Ten
1993–94	60th	10th
1994–95	76th	10th
1995–96	41st	8th
1996–97	31st	7th
1997–98	54th	10th
1998–99	34th	6th
1999–00	22nd	6th
2000–01	39th	8th
2001–02	29th	6th
2002–03	26th	6th
2003–04	37th	7th
2004–05	33rd	7th
2005–06	46th	10th
2006–07	34th	7th
2007–08	29th	6th
2008–09	27th	6th
2009–10	39th	7th
2010–11	42nd	9th
2011–12	34th	7th
2012–13	30th	7th
2013–14	29th	7th
2014–15	34th	8th
2015–16	53rd	10th
2016–17	53rd	13th
2017–18	50th	11th
2018–19	47th	11th

== See also ==
- List of college athletic programs in Michigan
