= Schmitter =

Schmitter is a surname. Notable people with the surname include:

== People ==
Netherlands

- Thierry Schmitter, Dutch sailor

France

- Frédéric Schmitter, French writer

Germany

- Elke Schmitter (born 1961), German novelist, poet and journalist

United States

- Charles Schmitter (1907–2002), American fencer and coach
- Philippe Schmitter, American political scientist

== See also ==
- Schmitter Peak, a peak in the Prince Charles Mountains
