= Stoecklin =

Stoecklin is a surname. Notable people with the surname include:

- Niklaus Stoecklin, Swiss artist
- Stéphane Stoecklin (born 1987), French handball right-back
- Tony Stoecklin (born 1970), American college baseball coach and former baseball pitcher
