= Marshfield High School =

Mashfield High School may refer to:

- Marshfield High School (Massachusetts)
- Marshfield High School (Missouri)
- Marshfield High School (Coos Bay, Oregon)
- Marshfield High School (Wisconsin)
