= 1981 NCAA Division I women's volleyball tournament =

Volleyball competition

1981 NCAA women's Division I volleyball tournament
- Champions: Southern California (1st NCAA (4th national) title)
- Runner-up: UCLA (1st NCAA (7th national) title match)
- Semifinalists: Pacific (1st Final Four); San Diego State (1st Final Four)
- Winning coach: Chuck Erbe (1st title)
- Final Four All-Tournament Team: Jeanne Beauprey (UCLA); Jayne Gibson (Pacific); Patty Orozco (UCLA); Linda Robertson (UCLA); Dana Smith (Southern California); Cathy Stukel (Southern California)

The 1981 NCAA Division I women's volleyball tournament was the first year that the NCAA sponsored women's volleyball, following 12 years in which the AIAW conducted the women's national intercollegiate championships. The tournament consisted of just 20 teams.

The Final Four was held on the campus of UCLA, where the heavily favored Bruins lost in the national title match against Southern California in five games: 9–15, 15–7, 10–15, 15–13, 15–7. Southern California finished the year 27–10.

In the consolation match, San Diego State swept Pacific, 3–0, to claim third place.

== Regionals ==
=== Northwest regional ===
Quarterfinals
Pepperdine	1
Texas A&M	3

Semifinals
Hawaiʻi	3
Texas A&M	0
Arizona	0
USC	3

Finals
Hawaiʻi	1
USC	3

=== Mideast regional ===
Quarterfinals
Penn State	3
Cincinnati	0

Semifinals
Pacific	3
Penn State	2
Cal Poly	3
Northwestern	0

Finals
Pacific	3
Cal Poly	1

=== South regional ===
Quarterfinals
Purdue	3
Tennessee	0

Semifinals
UCLA	3
Purdue	2
Stanford	3
Arizona State	0

Finals
UCLA	3
Stanford	2

=== West regional ===
Quarterfinals
New Mexico	3
Miami (OH)	0

Semifinals
San Diego State	3
New Mexico	1
BYU	2
UC Santa Barbara	3

Finals
San Diego State	3
UC Santa Barbara	0

== Final Four – Pauley Pavilion, Los Angeles ==
Semifinals
UCLA	3
San Diego State	1
USC	3
Pacific	2

Finals
UCLA	2
USC	3
Third place
San Diego State	3
Pacific	0

== NCAA Tournament record ==
There is one NCAA tournament record that was set during the 1981 tournament that still stands today.

- Solo blocks, tournament (individual record) - Jayne Gibson, Pacific - 15 (2 vs. Penn State, 4 vs. Cal Poly, 6 vs. Southern California, 3 vs. San Diego State)
