= St. Francis High School (Wheaton, Illinois) =

- St. Francis High School

Location
- 2130 West Roosevelt Road; Wheaton, Illinois 60187; United States
- 41°51′24″N 88°8′26″W

Information
- Type: Private college-preparatory, coeducational
- Motto: A Community in which Minds and Spirits Thrive
- Religious affiliation: Catholic
- Established: 1956
- Founders: Wheaton Franciscan Sisters; Sisters from the Institute of the Blessed Virgin Mary; Institute of the De La Salle Christian Brothers
- Oversight: Diocese of Joliet
- CEEB code: 144-383
- NCES School ID: 00346785
- President: Phil Kerr
- Principal: Raeann Huhn
- Teaching staff: 48.9
- Grades: 9–12
- Enrollment: 697 (2021–22)
- Average class size: 23
- Student to teacher ratio: 14.3
- Campus type: suburban
- Colors: Royal Blue and White
- Athletics conference: Chicago Catholic League
- Team name: Spartans
- Accreditation: AdvancED
- Publication: Focus
- Newspaper: Spartan Weekly
- Tuition: $20,000 (2023)
- Website: www.sfhscollegeprep.org

St. Francis High School, also known as St. Francis or SFHS among its students and faculty, is a co-educational, Catholic college-preparatory school, located in Wheaton, Illinois and was founded in 1957, by the Christian Brothers, Franciscan Sisters, and Ladies of Loretto (Institute of the Blessed Virgin Mary). It is currently operated by an independent Board of Directors.

== Curriculum highlights ==
- Full year and semester course offerings: 124
- Honors courses: 20
- Advanced Placement courses: 17
- Mobile Learning Initiative: All students use the Microsoft Surface Pro
- Trips to France and Spain
- Chinese Language Courses
- National Blue Ribbon School

== Co-curricular highlights ==
More than 30 special interest clubs and activities

- 12 female and 12 male multi-level sports programs.
- Full schedule of performing and visual arts including theatre, art, instrumental and vocal music
- Sixth Place Division 2A State Math Team
- First Place DuPage County and Third Place Overall for the Evergreen Club in the Northeastern Illinois Envirothon
- IHSA State Series Achievements 2014-2015: First Place Girls’ Volleyball, Football Semi-Finals, Third Place Baseball, Girls’ Soccer Regional Championship
- 12 State Championships in Girls’ Volleyball
- 2008 and 2025 State 5A Championship in Football
- 2012 and 2018 State Championships in Girls’ Soccer
- Past regional and sectional IHSA championships in Boys' Cross Country, Girls Tennis, Boys Tennis, Baseball, Softball, Boys’ Basketball, Boys’ Soccer, Football, Track, Dance, Cheer, Math Team, Boys’ and Girls’ Volleyball, and Boys' and Girls' Golf
- 63% of students participate in the performing arts
- 65% of students participate in the athletic programs
- 98% of students participate in co-curricular activities
- Member of the Chicago Catholic League (CCL) and the Girls Catholic Athletic Conference (GCAC)

== Notable alumni ==
- John Cullerton (born 1948), retired politician and former president of the Illinois Senate (2009–2020)
- Kristen Kelsay (born 1992), head volleyball coach at Michigan State
- Andi Matichak (born 1994), actress and model
- Alessio Milivojevic (born 2005), college football quarterback for the Michigan State Spartans
- Kelsey Robinson (born 1992), volleyball player, Bronze medalist at the 2016 Summer Olympics, 2020 Olympic Gold Medalist
- Eric Stout (born 1993), pitcher for the CTBC Brothers
- John Vande Velde (born 1948), track cyclist, who competed at the 1968 Summer Olympics and 1972 Summer Olympics
