= Kristen Kelsay =

American volleyball player and coach

- Kelsay in 2024

Current position
- Title: Head coach
- Team: Michigan State
- Conference: Big Ten
- Record: 38–31 (.551)

Biographical details
- Born: May 24, 1992 (age 34)
- Education: Michigan State University (BA); Northwestern (MA)

Playing career
- 2010–2013: Michigan State
- Position: Setter

Coaching career (HC unless noted)
- 2015–2018: Michigan State (asst.)
- 2019–2021: Northwestern (asst.)
- 2023–2024: Minnesota (associate HC)
- 2025–present: Michigan State

Accomplishments and honors

Awards
- AVCA Thirty Under 30 Award

Kristen Marie Kelsay (born May 24, 1992) is an American former volleyball player and coach. She is the current head coach for the Michigan State Spartans after previously serving as the associate head coach at Minnesota from 2023 to 2024.

== Personal life ==
Kelsay was born on May 24, 1992, to Bruce and Mary Kelsay. Her father played football for Minnesota from 1975 to 1977. She is originally from Wheaton, Illinois. She was a three-year letterwinner at St. Francis High School where she led her team to a state runner-up finish in 2007. She finished her high school career with 1,673 assists, 261 digs, 148 kills and 118 aces. Off the court, she was a 4.0 student who was the vice president of the National Honor Society her junior and senior year of high school.

== Playing career ==
At Michigan State, she finished her career ranking fourth all time in program history in sets played (473) and seventh in career assists (3,040). She helped the team to back-to-back Sweet 16 appearances in 2012 and 2013. Following her senior season, she was awarded Michigan State Athletics' Chester Brewer Leadership Award and the Dr. James Feurig Achievement and Service Award. Kelsay also earned CoSIDA Academic All-America honors and was a three-time Big Ten Distinguished Scholar and Academic All-Big Ten selection.

== Coaching career ==
Kelsay served as an assistant coach at her alma mater Michigan State under former head coach Cathy George from 2015 to 2018 and at Northwestern from 2019 to 2021. In 2022, she took a break from collegiate coaching and was the associate director and recruiting coordinator of Volleyball Club Nebraska. She also assisted with the USA National Team Development Program. In 2023, she was named associate head coach of Minnesota, working under head coach Keegan Cook.

=== Michigan State ===
Kelsay was named the head coach of Michigan State on December 22, 2024.

== Head coaching record ==
Record table
Season	Team	Overall	Conference	Standing	Postseason
Michigan State (Big Ten Conference) (2025–present)
2025	Michigan State	18–12	8–12	T–10th	
2026	Michigan State	20–9	8–9	11th	
Michigan State:		38–31 (.551)	16–21 (.432)		
Total:		38–31 (.551)			
