= SIU Edwardsville Cougars baseball =

- 2026 SIU Edwardsville Cougars baseball team
- Founded: 1968
- University: Southern Illinois University Edwardsville
- Head coach: Sean Lyons (10th season)
- Conference: Ohio Valley
- Location: Edwardsville, Illinois
- Home stadium: Roy E. Lee Field at Simmons Baseball Complex (capacity: 1,500)
- Nickname: Cougars
- Colors: Red and white

College World Series appearances
- Division II; 1972, 1976, 1977, 1983, 1985,1991, 1997, 2001

NCAA tournament appearances
- Division II; 1970, 1971, 1972, 1973, 1974, 1975, 1976, 1977, 1982, 1983, 1985, 1986, 1987, 1989, 1991, 1992, 1993, 1997, 1998, 2001, 2006, 2007

Conference tournament champions
- GLVC: 1997, 1998

Conference regular season champions
- OVC: 2026; GLVC: 2007; GLVC South: 1997, 1998, 2001

The SIU Edwardsville Cougars baseball team represents Southern Illinois University Edwardsville in NCAA Division I college baseball. They compete as members of the Ohio Valley Conference. SIUE plays its home games at Roy E. Lee Field at Simmons Baseball Complex, located in the northwest corner of the campus.

== History ==
The Cougars baseball program was started in 1967–68 by Roy Lee, who headed it for its first eleven years. In that time, his teams built a record of 237–144–3, going to 8 consecutive NCAA Division II playoffs and 3 Division II College World Series, with a runner-up finish in 1976.

After Coach Lee's retirement, the program was led for 34 years by SIUE alumnus Gary Collins. Collins' teams won 1028 games (with 766 loses & 7 ties). While still in Division II, his teams made 14 NCAA appearances and went to the Division II College World Series 5 times. He led them into Division I and the Ohio Valley Conference, where the Cougars completed their first season in the OVC in 2012 with an overall record of 27–28 and a conference record of 13–14, which tied for fifth place in the ten-team league.

In 2012, Gary Collins moved from coaching to become SIUE's first Director of Development for Intercollegiate Athletics.

With Collins' job change, after thirteen seasons as Collins' assistant, SIUE alumnus Tony Stoecklin was named acting head coach for 2013 and continued as head coach from 2014.

The 2014 squad became the first to qualify for the OVC Baseball Tournament, earning the No. 4 seed in the six team field.

Stoecklin was reassigned within the athletic department in mid-April 2016, with assistant Danny Jackson named as interim coach and a national search for a new coach to be launched after the season.

On June 24, 2016, Sean Lyons, the associate head coach at Bradley, was named the fourth head coach in Cougars' history.

== Record by year ==
Record table
Season	Coach	Overall	Conference	Standing	Postseason
SIU Edwardsville (Division II Independent) (1968–1995)
1968	Roy E. Lee	8–5			
1969	Roy E. Lee	11–14			
1970	Roy E. Lee	23–5			Regional 2nd
1971	Roy E. Lee	23–13			Regional 2nd
1972	Roy E. Lee	31–5–2			3rd DII CWS
1973	Roy E. Lee	26–8			Regional 6th
1974	Roy E. Lee	25–12			Regional 4th
1975	Roy E. Lee	23–13			Regional 4th
1976	Roy E. Lee	30–21			2nd DII CWS
1977	Roy E. Lee	25–18–1			8th DII CWS
1978	Roy E. Lee	12–20			
Roy E. Lee:		237–144–3 .621			
1979	Gary Collins	15–26			
1980	Gary Collins	26–27			
1981	Gary Collins	33–27			
1982	Gary Collins	34–21			Regional 4th
1983	Gary Collins	35–15			4th DII CWS
1984	Gary Collins	22–23			
1985	Gary Collins	36–15–1			6th DII CWS
1986	Gary Collins	39–21			Regional 4th
1987	Gary Collins	40–15–1			Regional 2nd
1988	Gary Collins	28–20			
1989	Gary Collins	31–18			Regional 2nd
1990	Gary Collins	36–14			Regional 2nd
1991	Gary Collins	43–17			5th DII CWS
1992	Gary Collins	36–20–1			Regional 3rd
1993	Gary Collins	19–18			
1994	Gary Collins	23–27–2			
1995	Gary Collins	31–17–1			
SIU Edwardsville (Great Lakes Valley Conference (Div. II)) (1996–2008)
1996	Gary Collins	29–22	17–11	3rd	
1997	Gary Collins	37–19	17–9	South 1st	5th DII CWS
1998	Gary Collins	38–15	16–4	South 1st	Regional 2nd
1999	Gary Collins	35–19	17–8	South 2nd	
2000	Gary Collins	33–23	19–8	South 2nd	
2001	Gary Collins	41–27	19–8	South 1st	5th DII CWS
2002	Gary Collins	30–24	16–12	4th	
2003	Gary Collins	24–26	17–13	2nd	
2004	Gary Collins	20–32	17–22	7th	
2005	Gary Collins	28–27	19–21	7th	
2006	Gary Collins	40–19–1	30–14–1	4th	Regional 3rd
2007	Gary Collins	37–17	26–10	1st	Regional 5th
2008	Gary Collins	25–26	18–14	West 2nd	
SIU Edwardsville (Division I Independent) (2009–2010)
2009	Gary Collins	15–39			
2010	Gary Collins	14–38			
SIU Edwardsville (Ohio Valley Conference) (2011–present)
2011	Gary Collins	28–24	Not eligible		
2012	Gary Collins	27–28	14–13	6th	
Gary Collins:		1028 –766–7 .573			
2013	Tony Stoecklin	16–35	10–20	t-8th	
2014	Tony Stoecklin	21–33	16–14	t-4th	
2015	Tony Stoecklin	20–30	19–11	3rd	
2016	Tony Stoecklin	7–27	4–14	11th	
Tony Stoecklin:		64–125 .339			
2016	Danny Jackson (Interim)	2–13	2–10	11th	
Danny Jackson:		2–13 .133			
2017	Sean Lyons	23–29	11–19	10th	
2018	Sean Lyons	15–37	6–24	11th	
2019	Sean Lyons	19–32	11–19	9th	
2020	Sean Lyons	8–7	3–1	t-1st ¶	
2021	Sean Lyons	23–27	13–17	9th	
2022	Sean Lyons	27–28	12–12	5th	
2023	Sean Lyons	26–28	9–15	7th	
2024	Sean Lyons	21–34–1	12–15	t-7th	
2025	Sean Lyons	26–28	18–8	2nd	
2026	Sean Lyons	–	–	1st	
Sean Lyons:		188–250–1 .429			
Total:		1495-1119-11 .572			
National champion Postseason invitational champion Conference regular season champion Conference regular season and conference tournament champion Division regular season champion Division regular season and conference tournament champion Conference tournament champion

¶ = season ended early by the COVID-19 pandemic.

== Notable former players ==
Through the years, many Cougars have gone on to play professionally, and twenty-one have been named All-Americans for their play at SIUE.

- Mike Allaria/Third Base 1972
- Nick Baltz/Pitcher 1975
- Tim Bateman/Pitcher 1990
- Mark Bugger/Shortstop 2000 & Second Base 2001
- Dan Cole/ First Base1972
- Ryan Cox/ Pitcher 1997
- Tim Degener/Catcher 1991
- Pete Delkus/Pitcher 1985
- Tony Duenas/First Base & Pitcher 1985
- Doug Duncan/First Base 1994
- Bret Giaudrone/Pitcher 2001
- Kyle Jones/Pitcher 2006
- Chris Kabbes/Outfield 1992
- Chad Opel/Shortstop 2001
- Dustin Quattrocchi/Pitcher 2012
- P.J. Riley/Outfield 1989
- Mike Robertson/Third Base 1997
- Ted Smith/Pitcher 1983
- John Urban/Third Base 1976
- Darrell Wehrend/Outfield 1982
- Matt Wilkinson/Pitcher 2001
- The most successful professional baseball player out of SIUE was John "Champ" Summers who played only one season for the Cougars before signing a pro contract after being seen by a major league scout while playing softball. Summers played for six teams during an eleven-year Major League career.
- Clay Zavada has pitched in the majors for the Arizona Diamondbacks, but is possibly better known for his award-winning mustache.
- Over the years, more than fifty former Cougars have played baseball in the major and minor leagues, but most have gone on to careers in other fields.

== See also ==
- List of NCAA Division I baseball programs
- Roy E. Lee Field at Simmons Baseball Complex
