= Leah Johnson (volleyball) =

American volleyball player and coach

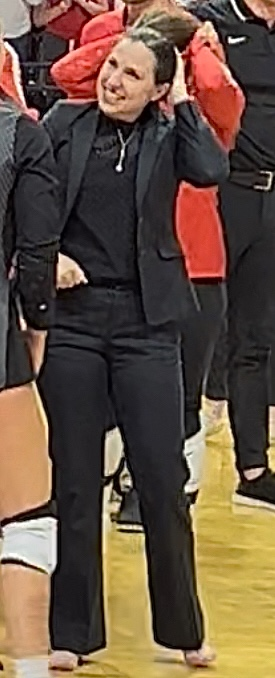
- Johnson in 2021

Current position
- Title: Head coach

Biographical details
- Born: July 20, 1981 (age 45); Fair Grove, Missouri
- Education: Southwest Missouri State University (BA, MA)

Playing career
- 2000–2003: Missouri State
- Position: Libero

Coaching career (HC unless noted)
- 2007–2008: Texas–Pan American (Asst.)
- 2008–2009: Missouri State (Asst.)
- 2010: Notre Dame (Volunteer Asst.)
- 2011–2016: SIU Edwardsville
- 2017–2021: Illinois State
- 2022–2024: Michigan State

Head coaching record
- Overall: 237–201 (.541)

Accomplishments and honors

Championships
- 2x MVC Regular Season Champions (2018, 2020); 3x MVC Tournament Champions (2019, 2020, 2021)

Awards
- AVCA North Region Coach of the Year (2021); Missouri Sports Hall of Fame (2019); Ohio Valley Conference Coach of the Year (2016)

Leah Michele Johnson (born July 20, 1981) is an American former volleyball player and most recently served as the head coach for the Michigan State Spartans women's volleyball team from 2022 to 2024.

== Personal life ==
Johnson is a native of Fair Grove, Missouri. She played volleyball at her high school Marshfield High School. She played collegiately for Southwest Missouri State University. She has a bachelor's degree in Spanish and master's degree in International Affairs and Administration, both from Missouri State.

She is married to A.J. Weissler and the couple has two children, Edith and PJ.

== Playing career ==
Johnson played volleyball for Southwest Missouri State University from 2000–2003. Johnson served as a team captain and helped the team to four-straight seasons with 20 or more wins and a Missouri Valley Conference regular season title in 2003. She ranks among Missouri State's all-time and single-season digs leaders. In 2019, along with her former teammates and coach she was inducted into the Missouri Sports Hall of Fame.

== Head coaching career ==
Johnson served several assistant coach roles before becoming a head coach in 2011. Notably, she was an assistant coach in 2008 and 2009 at her alma mater Missouri State. During the 2008 season, she helped the team to a conference tournament title and NCAA Tournament appearance. Missouri State had an overall record of 44-23 mark during her two seasons as an assistant coach. In 2010, she joined Notre Dame's coaching staff as a volunteer assistant. Some of her duties included executing practice plans, directing position-specific film sessions, scouting opponents, and tracking opponents’ offense during matches.

=== SIU Edwardsville ===
Johnson was named the head coach of SIU Edwardsville volleyball program in 2011. At that time, they were an NCAA Division II program with a low win record. By 2016, SIU Edwardsville completed its transition to NCAA Division I. She was named the 2016 Ohio Valley Conference Coach of the Year after leading the team to the conference tournament championship match for the second time in program history. In 2016, the program had 22 Division I wins, its highest ever in program history. In their first season finishing above .500 at the Division I level, the Cougars went 22-8, appearing in the OVC championship for only the second time in program history.

=== Illinois State ===
Johnson was named the women's volleyball head coach at Illinois State in 2017. Johnson's overall record at Illinois State was 104-53 record and included five NCAA postseason appearances, including four straight NCAA Tournaments, marking the longest streak at ISU in nearly four decades (1982–85). Johnson was named the AVCA North Region Coach of the Year after coaching a team full of newcomers to a 19-14 overall record. Despite the higher number of losses compared to previous seasons, she helped Illinois State to its fourth consecutive NCAA bid after winning the conference tournament.

Johnson signed a five-year contract extension with Illinois State in January 2022, but on February 7, 2022, she was announced as the new head coach at Michigan State.

=== Michigan State ===
On February 7, 2022, Johnson was announced as Michigan State's head coach, following the retirement of Cathy George.

On December 16, 2024, it was announced the Johnson and Michigan State were mutually parting ways, effectively immediately. She finished her career at Michigan State with a 43–50 (.462) record.

== Head coaching record ==
Record table
Season	Team	Overall	Conference	Standing	Postseason
SIU Edwardsville (Ohio Valley Conference) (2011–2016)
2011	SIU Edwardsville	13–19	8–12	T–7th	
2012	SIU Edwardsville	9–18	5–11	7th	
2013	SIU Edwardsville	14–18	8–8	9th	
2014	SIU Edwardsville	14–17	6–10	9th	
2015	SIU Edwardsville	8–18	6–10	T–9th	
2016	SIU Edwardsville	22–8	13–3	2nd	
SIU Edwardsville:		90–98 (.479)	46–54 (.460)		
Illinois State (Missouri Valley Conference) (2017–2021)
2017	Illinois State	22–13	13–5	3rd	
2018	Illinois State	25–8	16–2	T–1st	NCAA First Round
2019	Illinois State	22–12	12–6	3rd	NCAA First Round
2020	Illinois State	16–6	11–3	1st	NCAA First Round
2021	Illinois State	19–14	13–5	2nd	NCAA First Round
Illinois State:		104–53 (.662)	65–21 (.756)		
Michigan State (Big Ten Conference) (2022–2024)
2022	Michigan State	13–18	4–16	T–12th	
2023	Michigan State	17–14	9–11	T–6th	
2024	Michigan State	13–18	6–14	13th	
Michigan State:		43–50 (.462)	19–41 (.317)		
Total:		237–201 (.541)			
National champion Postseason invitational champion Conference regular season champion Conference regular season and conference tournament champion Division regular season champion Division regular season and conference tournament champion Conference tournament champion
