= Gary Collins (baseball coach) =

American baseball coach (born 1947)

Biographical details
- Born: November 8, 1947 (age 78); East Alton, Illinois, U.S.
- Education: Southern Illinois University Edwardsville

Playing career
- 1968–69: SIU Edwardsville Cougars
- 1969–70: St. Louis Cardinals minor leagues
- Positions: 1st base, outfield

Coaching career (HC unless noted)
- 1971–73: SIU Edwardsville Cougars (asst.)
- 1974–78: Lewis and Clark Community College (asst.)
- 1979–2012: SIU Edwardsville Cougars

Administrative career (AD unless noted)
- 2012–14: SIU Edwardsville Cougars/Director of Development for Intercollegiate Athletics

Head coaching record
- Overall: 1028–766–7

Accomplishments and honors

Awards
- GLVC Coach of the Year 1998, 2007; St. Louis Amateur Baseball Hall of Fame Class of 2014; SIUE Athletics Hall of Fame Class of 2015; ABCA Hall of Fame Class of 2019

Garrett Ray Collins, known as Gary "Bo" Collins is a retired college head coach who coached the SIU Edwardsville Cougars baseball team from 1979 to 2012. His teams had 1028 career wins, making him the 56th winningest baseball coach in NCAA baseball and the seventh-highest winner among coaches in NCAA Division II.

== Career ==
A native of East Alton, Illinois and a graduate of Roxana High School, Collins entered Southern Illinois University Edwardsville (SIUE) as a student just before the school initiated intercollegiate athletics. As a junior at SIUE, he became a member of Harry Gallatin's first Cougar basketball team in 1967–68 and a vital member of Roy E. Lee's inaugural baseball team in 1968, returning to play for both teams as a senior. His baseball play earned SIUE Baseball Player of the Year honors in 1969 and resulted in his being the first SIUE student-athlete to be drafted to play professional baseball.

Collins was a 12th round pick of the St. Louis Cardinals in the June, 1969 Major League Baseball draft as a first baseman and outfielder. After two seasons with six clubs in the Cardinal organization, Collins returned to SIUE, becoming an assistant coach for Roy Lee.

Collins spent two seasons as Lee's assistant, then moved to Lewis and Clark Community College as assistant to coach Arnold Copeland. In 1979, Collins returned to SIUE, replacing the retiring Roy Lee as the Cougars head coach. Over the following 34 seasons, Collins' Cougars built a record of 1,028–766–7. In Collins' first thirty years as the Cougar coach, the school continued as the strong Division II program built by Coach Lee, earning fourteen trips to the NCAA Division II Baseball Championship tournament and advancing to the Division II College World Series five times. In 2009, the Cougars began the transition to NCAA Division I, joining the Ohio Valley Conference (OVC). In the team's first year of eligibility, the Cougars qualified for the 2012 OVC Tournament. Having seen the team through its transition to Division I, in July 2012, Collins stepped down as the Cougar's head coach, assuming new duties as SIUE's first Director of Development for Intercollegiate Athletics. He retired from the university in February 2014.

Collins earned his bachelor's degree in Physical Education in 1970 and added a master's degree in counselor education in 1973, both from SIUE.

Collins is one of seven individuals who will be inducted into the American Baseball Coaches Association (ABCA) Hall of Fame in January 2019.

== Head coaching record ==
Record table
Season	Team	Overall	Conference	Standing	Postseason
SIUE Cougars (NCAA Division II independent) (1979–1995)
1979	SIUE Cougars	15–26			
1980	SIUE Cougars	26–27			
1981	SIUE Cougars	33–27			
1982	SIUE Cougars	34–21			Div. II Regional 4th
1983	SIUE Cougars	35–15			Div. II CWS 4th
1984	SIUE Cougars	22–23			
1985	SIUE Cougars	36–15–1			Div. II CWS 6th
1986	SIUE Cougars	39–21			Div. II Regional 4th
1987	SIUE Cougars	40–15–1			Div. II Regional Runner-up
1988	SIUE Cougars	28–20			
1989	SIUE Cougars	31–18			Div. II Regional Runner-up
1990	SIUE Cougars	36–14			Div. II Regional Runner-up
1991	SIUE Cougars	43–17			Div. II CWS 5th
1992	SIUE Cougars	36–20–1			Div. II Regional 3rd
1993	SIUE Cougars	19–18			
1994	SIUE Cougars	23–27–2			
1995	SIUE Cougars	31–17–1			
SIUE Cougars (Great Lakes Valley Conference) (1996–2008)
1996	SIUE Cougars	29–22	17–11	3rd	
1997	SIUE Cougars	37–19	17–9	1st (South)	Div. II CWS 5th
1998	SIUE Cougars	38–15	16–4	1st (South)	Div. II Regional Runner-up
1999	SIUE Cougars	35–19	17–8	2nd (South)	
2000	SIUE Cougars	33–23	19–8	2nd (South)	
2001	SIUE Cougars	41–27	19–8	1st (South)	Div. II CWS 5th
2002	SIUE Cougars	30–24	16–12	4th	
2003	SIUE Cougars	24–26	17–13	2nd	
2004	SIUE Cougars	20–32	17–22	7th	
2005	SIUE Cougars	28–27	19–21	7th	
2006	SIUE Cougars	40–19–1	30–14–1	4th	Div. II Regional 3rd
2007	SIUE Cougars	37–17	26–10	1st	Div. II Regional 5th
2008	SIUE Cougars	25–26	18–14	West 2nd	
SIUE Cougars (NCAA Division I independent) (2009–2010)
2009	SIUE Cougars	15–39			
2010	SIUE Cougars	14–38			
SIUE Cougars (Ohio Valley Conference) (2011–2012)
2011	SIUE Cougars	28–24	Ineligible		
2012	SIUE Cougars	27–28	13–14	6th	
SIUE:		1,028–766–7			
Total:		1,028–766–7			
National champion Postseason invitational champion Conference regular season champion Conference regular season and conference tournament champion Division regular season champion Division regular season and conference tournament champion Conference tournament champion
