= Paula Buscher =

SIU Edwardsville women's basketball head coach

Biographical details
- Born: April 4, 1963 (age 63); Peoria, Illinois, U.S.

Playing career
- 1981–1983: Illinois Central CC
- 1983–1985: Southwest Missouri State
- Position: Point guard

Coaching career (HC unless noted)
- 1986–1988: Illinois State (asst.)
- 1988–1997: Nebraska–Omaha (asst.)
- 1997–1998: Mankato State
- 1998–2000: Nebraska Omaha
- 2000–2012: Bradley
- 2013–2021: SIU Edwardsville

Head coaching record
- Overall: 305–317 (.490)

Paula Jean Buscher (born April 4, 1963) is an American college basketball coach, previously the women's head coach at Southern Illinois University Edwardsville in Edwardsville, Illinois. The SIU Edwardsville Cougars are members of the Ohio Valley Conference (OVC) and compete in the NCAA's Division I.

== Biography ==
A native of Peoria, Illinois, Buscher played basketball and softball at Peoria's Richwoods High School, with her basketball team finishing second at the 1981 IHSA Class AA state Tournament. She then played both sports at Illinois Central College (ICC) under the legendary coach Lorene Ramsey, a member of both the National Softball Hall of Fame and the Women's Basketball Hall of Fame. At ICC, Buscher's teams finished fifth and third in the NJCAA national tournament, and won the 1982 NJCAA softball national championship. She was inducted into the Greater Peoria Sports Hall of Fame in 1987 as a member of that championship softball team; she was additionally inducted as an individual in 2015.

Buscher then attended Missouri State University, once more playing both basketball and softball for the Missouri State Bears. She earned her bachelor's degree from Missouri State in 1986. She then moved on to Illinois State University, spending two seasons as graduate assistant coach of the Illinois State Redbirds women's basketball team and earning her master's degree in athletic administration in 1988.

== Coaching career ==
After earning her master's degree, Buscher served as women's basketball assistant coach at the NCAA Division II University of Nebraska at Omaha (Omaha) from 1988 to 1997. After leaving Omaha, Buscher took her first job as head coach at Mankato State. Following the previous season's 7–29 record, Mankato State under Buscher improved to 17–10, remaining one of the greatest turnarounds in NCAA Division II history. After only one season at Mankato State, Buscher returned to Omaha in 1998 as the schools women's basketball head coach.

Following a successful second season at Omaha, she was hired as women's basketball head coach at Division I Bradley University in her hometown of Peoria. In twelve seasons at Bradley, Buscher raised the Braves women's program from their previous status as perennial doormats in the Missouri Valley Conference (MVC) into a contender in the MVC. Her 2006–10 squad got the program's first win in the MVC tournament. The 2008–09 team set the school women's record for most wins with 21. The 2009–10 received the program's first bid to a post-season tournament and won the first post-season victory in the Women's Basketball Invitational (MBI). The 2011–12 team also advanced to the second round of the MBI. Her 167 wins is the most for any Bradley women's coach.

In June 2012, Buscher was named the fifth head coach of the SIU Edwardsville Cougars women's basketball team.

== Head coaching record ==
Record table
Season	Team	Overall	Conference	Standing	Postseason
Mankato State Mavericks (North Central Conference (Div. II)) (1997–1998)
1997–98	Mankato State	17–10	8–10	6th	
Mankato State:		17–10	8–10		
Nebraska Omaha Mavericks (North Central Conference (Div. II)) (1998–2000)
1998–99	UNO	11–16	6–12	7th	
1999–2000	UNO	15–12	7–11	7th	
Nebraska Omaha:		26–28	13–23		
Bradley Braves (Missouri Valley Conference) (2000–2012)
2000–01	Bradley	10–17	5–13	8th	
2001–02	Bradley	16–12	7–11	7th	
2002–03	Bradley	13–15	9–9	6th	
2003–04	Bradley	9–19	7–11	t–6th	
2004–05	Bradley	15–13	8–10	t–6th	
2005–06	Bradley	9–19	5–13	t–9th	
2006–07	Bradley	12–19	7–11	7th	
2007–08	Bradley	12–18	6–12	8th	
2008–09	Bradley	21–10	11–7	4th	
2009–10	Bradley	17–14	12–6	t–3rd	WBI Quarterfinals
2010–11	Bradley	15–16	7–11	8th	
2011–12	Bradley	18–16	7–11	8th	WBI Quarterfinals
Bradley:		167–188	91–125		
SIU Edwardsville Cougars (Ohio Valley Conference) (2012–present)
2012–13	SIUE	16–15	9–7	3rd (West)	
2013–14	SIU Edwardsville	11–19	7–9	T–2rd (West)	
2014–15	SIU Edwardsville	19–12	13–3	2nd	
2015–16	SIU Edwardsville	18–13	12–4	3rd	
2016–17	SIU Edwardsville	14–17	9–7	3rd	
2017–18	SIU Edwardsville	17–15	13–5	3rd	WBI 1st round
SIU Edwardsville:		95 – 91 (.511)	63 – 35 (.643)		
Total:		305 – 317 (.490)			
National champion Postseason invitational champion Conference regular season champion Conference regular season and conference tournament champion Division regular season champion Division regular season and conference tournament champion Conference tournament champion
