= Roy E. Lee Field at Simmons Baseball Complex =

Baseball venue in Edwardsville, Illinois

- Interactive map of Roy E. Lee Field at Simmons Baseball Complex
- Address: 5200 New Poag Road; Edwardsville, Illinois, USA
- Coordinates: 38.798497°N 90.018572°W
- Owner: Southern Illinois University Edwardsville
- Operator: Southern Illinois University Edwardsville
- Capacity: 1,000 permanent seats ≤500 on the lawn
- Surface: Artificial turf
- Scoreboard: Electronic
- Field size: Left field: 330 feet (100 m); Center field: 390 feet (120 m); Right field: 330 feet (100 m)

Construction
- Opened: 1972
- Renovated: 2004, 2005, 2011, 2014
- Expanded: 2005

Tenant
- SIU Edwardsville Cougars baseball (OVC)

Roy E. Lee Field at Simmons Baseball Complex is a baseball venue in Edwardsville, Illinois, United States. It is home to the SIU Edwardsville Cougars baseball team of the NCAA Division I Ohio Valley Conference. The facility, which has a capacity of 1,500 spectators, is named for SIUE's first baseball coach, Roy E. Lee. The distance to the fences is 330 feet to right and left fields and 390 to center.

In the offseason following the 2010 season, the locker rooms and dugouts were renovated. Additionally, the field features an AstroTurf GameDay Grass playing field, an electronic scoreboard, and a stand of pine trees in center field that acts as a batter's eye. The seating structure lies behind home plate and includes a covered grandstand of bleacher-style seating along with three rows of chairback seating closest to the field.

In the summer of 2014, additional improvements were made with funding approved by the SIU Board of Trustees in February. The outfield grass was replaced with the same AstroTurf GameDay Grass as has been on the infield since 2011 to allow year-round practice and play. The outfield wall was also replaced, creating a symmetrical field.

== See also ==
- List of NCAA Division I baseball venues
