= Marshfield High School (Missouri) =

Public high school in Marshfield, Missouri with 956 students

Location
- 370 State Highway DD; Marshfield, Missouri; United States; 37.3386°N 92.8880°W

Information
- Type: Public
- Established: 2001
- School district: Marshfield R-I School District
- Teaching staff: 59.17 (FTE)
- Grades: 9 to 12
- Enrollment: 865 (2024–2025)
- Student to teacher ratio: 14.62
- Colors: Blue & white
- Athletics conference: Big 8 Conference (East)
- Mascot: Bluejay
- Nickname: Jays
- Team name: Blue Jays/ Lady Jays
- Website: mhs.mjays.us

Marshfield High School is a public high school, located in Marshfield, Missouri which is located in Webster County. It is part of the Marshfield R-1 School District and holds grades 9–12. As of 2012 it contains 956 students and 59 classroom teachers. The current teacher to student ratio is 1:16 which is higher than the Missouri average (1:13).

== Athletics ==
Marshfield High School's official mascot is the blue jay. They are part of the Big 8 Conference. From the late 1980s to the late 90s the Lady Jays basketball team made many state play off runs and seven championship wins under coaches Scott Ballard and Gary Murphy.

- Baseball - Men
- Basketball – Men & Women
- Cheerleading - Co-ed
- Cross Country – Men & Women
- Debate - Co-ed
- Football - Men
- Golf – Men & Women
- Competitive Maths - Co-ed
- Soccer - Men & Women
- Softball - Women
- Speech - Co-ed
- Swimming - Men & Women
- Track and field – Men & Women
- Volleyball – Co-ed
- Wrestling - Men
- (2012-2013) Archery - Men & Women

== Notable alumni ==
- Leah Johnson, head volleyball coach at Michigan State University
