= Charles Schmitter =

Personal information
- Nickname: Maestro Charles Schmitter
- Born: June 19, 1907 Detroit, Michigan
- Died: March 16, 2002 (aged 94)

Sport
- Country: United States
- Sport: Fencing
- Team: Michigan State Spartans

Charles R. Schmitter was an American fencer, Olympic and collegiate coach, and professor emeritus of health and physical education at Michigan State University. He was a founder of the National Fencing Coaches' Association (NFCA) and is credited as being a major contributor to the growth of fencing in the Midwest.

== Early career ==
Charles Schmitter's fencing career began as a student at the University of Detroit, where he and a friend organized the school's first fencing team. Schmitter became the school's fencing coach in 1929 and remained there until he turned pro in 1938 and accepted a part-time coaching job at Michigan State.

== Michigan State ==
Schmitter began his long association with MSU in 1938, and was named the school's full-time fencing coach in 1940. In 1956, he became the first native-born American to win a Maestro's Diploma from the Italian School of Fencing. In 1957, he was named the inaugural "Fencing Coach of the Year" by the National Fencing Coaches Association.

As a coach, Schmitter was known as a fierce competitor who constantly strove to learn about and improve his sport. In the Spartan Sports Encyclopedia, Jack Seibold notes, "In a traditional post-season display of dominance over his pupils, Coach Schmitter single-handedly defeated the nine-man varsity squad, 18-9. His scores were 7-2 in foil, 7-2 in sabre, and 4-5 in epee." According to one student recollection, as late as 1975 "Coach" (then age 67) would keep overly-confident team members' egos in check by standing perfectly still and slowly and steadily advancing his foil point toward their chest; the student was free to parry any way they wished but Coach would evade all attempts while keeping his point in line as required by the rules, inexorably advancing and, at the end of 3–4 seconds, finally touching dead center of the student's chest. In 1982, he developed an early version of the electronic scoring system used in modern Olympic fencing competitions.

Schmitter retired as coach in 1984 and was succeeded by former pupil Fred Freiheit. Michigan State relegated its fencing program to club status in 1997.

== International career ==
Schmitter was a founding member of the National Fencing Coaches Association and an Olympic Committee member for the 1956 and 1960 Summer Olympics as well as fencing coach for the 1959 Pan American Games.

Schmitter was also president of the Olympic Fencing Committee, coached Olympic athletes, developed and adapted a treatise on fencing, and was a multiple-time Michigan State Champion in all three fencing weapons. He was inducted into the United States Fencing Association USFA Hall of Fame in 1974.

== Legacy ==
Charles Schmitter died in his sleep on March 16, 2002. He was survived by his wife, Ruth and their three children. The Great Lakes Sword Club (GLSC) of Michigan held an annual memorial tournament named after Schmitter. GLSC's Annual Schmitter Memorial honored Maestro Charles Schmitter and his many contributions to the sport of American fencing.

In addition to fencing, Schmitter was an accomplished tuba and string bass player and a member of the American Federation of Musicians. He could also speak four languages: French, Italian, and Russian and German.

=== Library ===
Schmitter started a collection of fencing books during his time at the University of Detroit. He eventually amassed a collection of books spanning nearly four centuries in over a dozen languages from all over the world.

Charles and Ruth Schmitter donated the collection to the Michigan State University Libraries in 1982. With over 500 titles, it was described as second only to the collection held at the Library of Congress.
