= Chuck Erbe =

American volleyball coach

Chuck Erbe (born October 12, 1944) is an American volleyball coach. For the United States, he coached the teams that went to the 1974 FIVB Volleyball Women's World Championship and the 1981 World University Games. As a United States Volleyball Association coach, his Californian teams won the Women's Open event at the Indoor Open National Championship in 1975 and 1980. With the USC Trojans women's volleyball team primarily from 1976 to 1989, his players won three AIAW Volleyball Championships. In the NCAA, they were the 1981 NCAA Division I women's volleyball tournament winners and were runner ups in the 1982 NCAA Division I women's volleyball tournament. Erbe had 310 wins, 121 losses and 3 ties with USC before ending his coaching position.

After working for a year as an assistant coach for the University of Illinois, Erbe held multiple volleyball positions in Chicago during the 1990s. With the Michigan State Spartans women's volleyball team, Erbe was their coach from 1993 to 2004. While accumulating 244 wins and 140 losses, his team reached the Final Four at the 1995 NCAA Division I women's volleyball tournament. Outside of coaching, Erbe has worked as a volleyball referee. He received Coach of the Year awards from the Big Ten Conference and American Volleyball Coaches Association in 1995. Erbe joined the AVCA Hall of Fame in 2013.

== Early life and education ==
Erbe was born in Tulsa, Oklahoma, on October 12, 1944. During his childhood, Erbe played golf. For his post-secondary education, he attended Ripon College before going to the University of Kansas. Erbe also went to California State University, Fullerton during the 1970s. In between his studies, he worked for the United States Navy as a corpsman during the 1960s.

== Career ==
=== High school and USA Volleyball ===
While in California during the early 1970s, Erbe worked at Tustin and Huntington Beach as a high school volleyball coach. In 1972, the Adidas volleyball club was founded by Erbe in Los Angeles. As their coach, Erbe won the Women's Open event held during the 1975 United States Volleyball Association Indoor Open National Championship. He won the 1980 edition with a team from Fountain Valley. In 1981, Erbe and the California Juniors entered the United States Volleyball Association Junior National Championships. They were second in the Girls 19 and Under division.

During this time period, Erbe was the women's coach of the Junior National Volleyball Team for the United States in 1973. It was founded that year and made from his Adidas team. The following year, Erbe coached the American team that competed at the 1974 FIVB Volleyball Women's World Championship. Erbe and the United States won the Pacific Rim International Volleyball Championships in 1975 and 1976. His team did not play for the United States at the 1976 Summer Olympics. Due to the 1980 Summer Olympics boycott, Erbe did not work with the American women's volleyball team as an assistant coach. At the 1981 World University Games, he was the American women's volleyball coach.

=== California ===
In 1976, Erbe became the coach of the USC Trojans women's volleyball team. With the University of Southern California, Erbe's team won the AIAW National Large College Volleyball Championship in 1976 and 1977. In February 1978, Erbe ended his coaching position with USC. By December 1978, Erbe was an assistant coach for the university. After becoming the coach of their women's volleyball team in 1979, Erbe and Southern California won the 1980 AIAW National Division I Volleyball Championship.

While with USC during the 1980s, Erbe declined an offer to become the volleyball coach for the University of Illinois. In 1981, Southern California joined the NCAA Division I. That year, Erbe's team won the 1981 NCAA Division I women's volleyball tournament. They also were runner-ups at the 1982 NCAA Division I women's volleyball tournament. After accumulating 310 wins, 121 losses and 3 ties with Southern California, he left his coaching position in January 1989.

=== Illinois ===
In February 1989, Erbe was considered by Southern Illinois University Carbondale to become their volleyball coach. With the University of Illinois, Erbe was an assistant volleyball coach from April 1989 to 1990. For the Great Lakes Volleyball Center, he held a directorship from 1990 to 1993. With the organization, Erbe was a scheduler during 1991.

During the 1990s, Erbe worked in Chicago and was with Sports Performance as a referee. While there, Erbe worked with the volleyball club as their coach. By 1993, the University of Michigan and Michigan State University had declined to hire Erbe as a coach.

=== Michigan and referee experience ===
In 1993, Erbe joined the Michigan State Spartans women's volleyball team as their coach. As part of the Big Ten Conference, Erbe's team won the conference in 1995 and were co-winners in 1996. During this time period, Erbe and Michigan State reached the Final Four during the 1995 NCAA Division I women's volleyball tournament. During the early 2000s, he worked on creating a locker room for the volleyball players. After accumulating 244 wins and 140 losses, Erbe ended his coaching career with Michigan State in 2004.

During 2005, Erbe went to Chicago and was a youth volleyball referee. He was a referee in a 2008 college volleyball game held by Texas Tech and Nebraska. In 2019, Erbe continued his coaching career when he was hired by Forest Hills Eastern to lead their volleyball team.

== Honors and personal life ==
With Michigan State, Erbe received the women's volleyball Coach of the Year award in the media and coaches categories from the Big Ten Conference in 1995. That year, Erbe was named National Coach of the Year for Division I schools by the American Volleyball Coaches Association. From USA Volleyball, Erbe received the James E. Coleman USA National Team Award in 2011 and the Bertha H. Lucas All-Time Great Coach in 2013. In 2013, Erbe joined the AVCA Hall of Fame. His marriage occurred in 1994.
