= Jayne McHugh =

American volleyball player (1960–2025)

Jayne Marie McHugh (May 31, 1960 – November 15, 2025) was an American volleyball player. She played for the United States national team at the 1988 Summer Olympics. McHugh died on November 15, 2025, at the age of 65.
