= Michigan State Spartans women's volleyball =

American college volleyball team

Michigan State Spartans Women's Volleyball
- University: Michigan State University
- Head coach: Kristen Kelsay (2nd season)
- Conference: Big Ten
- Location: East Lansing, Michigan, US
- Home arena: Breslin Center (capacity: 14,759)
- Nickname: Spartans
- Colors: Green and white

AIAW/NCAA tournament semifinal
- 1995

AIAW/NCAA Regional Final
- 1995, 1996, 2017

AIAW/NCAA regional semifinal
- 1995, 1996, 2002, 2007, 2012, 2013, 2017

AIAW/NCAA tournament appearance
- 1975, 1976, 1994, 1995, 1996, 1997, 1998, 1999, 2000, 2001, 2002, 2003, 2006, 2007, 2009, 2011, 2012, 2013, 2014, 2015, 2016, 2017

Conference regular season champion
- 1975, 1976, 1995, 1996

The Michigan State Spartans women's volleyball team was founded in 1972. They play home matches at the Breslin Center, which they moved to in 2022 after playing at Jenison Fieldhouse.

== History ==
=== Carol Davis era ===
Carol Davis was the first Michigan State indoor volleyball coach in 1972 before being named the first women’s athletic director in the history of the Big Ten.

=== Karen Peterson era ===
Karen Peterson was the second Michigan State indoor volleyball coach in 1973. She coached the team to a 6–11 record.

=== Annelies Knoppers era ===
Annelies Knoppers took over the head coaching position in 1974.

In her second year of coaching, Michigan State qualified for the Association of Intercollegiate Athletics for Women (AIAW) championships, one of 24 teams to be invited to the tournament. In the 1976 season, Knoppers' Spartans finished the season 35–6. They improved on their 1975 finish in the Midwest Regionals, this time securing a win. They were seeded eighth in the 24 team AIAW tournament.

Knoppers coached for 11 seasons, compiling a 250-197-18 record. She was the coach when the Big Ten Conference started sponsoring volleyball in 1983. She retired to pursue a teaching career.

=== Ginger Mayson era ===
Ginger Mayson started coaching the Spartans in 1985. She finished her career with an overall record of 67-181 and a Big Ten Conference record of 22–126 over eight seasons.

=== Chuck Erbe era ===
Chuck Erbe was the first male head coach of the Michigan State women's volleyball team, coaching for 12 seasons. His teams participated in the NCAA tournament in ten of those seasons. Their overall record under Erbe was 244-140, with a Big Ten record of 140-100. Erbe was inducted into the AVCA Hall of Fame.

=== Cathy George era ===
Cathy George began coaching the team in 2005. She led the Spartans to 10 NCAA Tournament Appearances. She retired at the end of the 2021 season as the winningest coach in program history, leading the Spartans to a 302–233 record.

=== Leah Johnson era ===
Leah Johnson served as head coach from 2022–2024. Before coaching the Spartans, she was the head volleyball coach for the Illinois State Redbirds.

=== Kristen Kelsay era ===
Spartan volleyball alumna Kristen Kelsay was appointed as the head coach in 2025, after serving as the associate head coach for the Minnesota Golden Gophers. In the 2026-27 season, the Spartans returned to the national rankings for the first time since the 2018-19 season.
