= Tony Stoecklin =

Baseball coach

Biographical details
- Born: September 10, 1970 (age 56); Greenville, Illinois, U.S.

Playing career
- 1991–1992: SIU Edwardsville
- Position: Pitcher

Coaching career (HC unless noted)
- 1999–2012: SIU Edwardsville (Asst.)
- 2013–2016: SIU Edwardsville

Head coaching record
- Overall: 64–125
- Tournaments: Ohio Valley: 0–4

Tony Stoecklin (born September 10, 1970) is an American college baseball coach and former professional baseball pitcher. He played two seasons at SIU Edwardsville before being drafted by the Atlanta Braves in the 23rd round of the 1992 Major League Baseball draft. Stoecklin pursued his dream of a big league career for three seasons in the Braves organization, reaching the Class-A Carolina League, before spending six seasons in independent leagues. He returned to SIU Edwardsville as an assistant coach in 1999, and helped guide the team to the Division I level in 2008. Stoecklin was named head coach in July 2012.

== Head coaching record ==
This table shows Stoecklin's record as a head coach at the Division I level.

Record table
Season	Team	Overall	Conference	Standing	Postseason
SIU Edwardsville (Ohio Valley Conference) (2013–present)
2013	SIU Edwardsville	16–35	10–20	8th	
2014	SIU Edwardsville	21–33	16–14	t-4th	Ohio Valley Tournament
2015	SIU Edwardsville	20–30	19–11	3rd	Ohio Valley Tournament
2016	SIU Edwardsville	7–27	4–14	fired	
SIU Edwardsville:		64–125	49–59		
Total:		64–125			
National champion Postseason invitational champion Conference regular season champion Conference regular season and conference tournament champion Division regular season champion Division regular season and conference tournament champion Conference tournament champion

== See also ==
- List of current NCAA Division I baseball coaches
