= Roy Lee (baseball) =

American baseball player

- Pitcher
- Born: September 28, 1917; Elmira, New York, U.S.
- Died: November 11, 1985 (aged 68); St. Louis, Missouri, U.S.
- Batted: Left Threw: Left

MLB debut
- September 23, 1945, for the New York Giants

Last MLB appearance
- September 29, 1945, for the New York Giants

MLB statistics
- Win–loss record: 0–2
- Earned run average: 11.57
- Strikeouts: 0
- Stats at Baseball Reference

Teams
- New York Giants (1945)

Roy Edwin Lee (September 28, 1917 – November 11, 1985) was an American professional baseball player and collegiate coach. He was a Major League Baseball pitcher who played for the New York Giants in 1945.

== Coaching ==
Roy Lee was named the head coach of the Saint Louis University baseball program in 1960. In seven years, his Billikens built a record of 125–84–5. His teams won the Missouri Valley Conference (MVC) regular season title in 1966 and the MVC Tournament championship in 1964–66, earning a place in the National Collegiate Athletic Association (NCAA) playoffs. Lee's Billikens placed third in the 1965 College World Series.

In 1967, Lee departed the successful Division I program at St. Louis to start the new Division II program at Southern Illinois University Edwardsville (SIUE). With no scholarships and almost no budget, he quickly built a successful program. In his eleven years as the Cougars' head coach, his teams had a record of 237–144–3 and made eight successive appearances in the NCAA playoffs. Lee's Cougars advanced to the Division II College World Series three times and finished as the 1976 runners-up.

On April 26, 1986, between the games of a double-header, the SIUE baseball field was rededicated and named Roy E. Lee Field.
