= Cathy George =

Biographical details
- Education: Illinois State

Playing career
- 1981-1985: Illinois State

Coaching career (HC unless noted)
- 1987-1988: North Dakota State
- 1989-1993: UT-Arlington
- 1994-2004: Western Michigan
- 2005-2021: Michigan State
- 2024-present: Grand Rapids Rise

Head coaching record
- Overall: 667-457 (.593) (collegiate)

Accomplishments and honors

Awards
- MAC Coach of the Year (2000) 3x Southland Coach of the Year (1989, 1990, 1992); NCAA Division II National Coach of the Year (1988) 2x North Central Coach of the Year (1987, 1988)

Cathy George is a college women's volleyball coach. She began her coaching career at North Dakota State, coaching there for two years. She moved on to coach Texas-Arlington and made the NCAA tournament twice with the team. She coached Western Michigan next, appearing in the NCAA tournament in 2000 and receiving MAC Coach of the Year. George was most recently the head coach of the Michigan State Spartans and retired at the end of the 2021 season.

== Early life ==
Cathy George graduated from Illinois State in 1985. She lettered in volleyball all four years at the university. While on the team, they won three consecutive conference titles and had three consecutive NCAA tournament appearances. George was a team captain. She also earned All-MVC three times.

George earned her master's degree in education from Central Michigan in 1987. She is married and has two sons.

== Coaching career ==
=== North Dakota State ===
George spent two years coaching at North Dakota State, finishing with an overall record of 87-11. She was the NCAA Division II Coach of the Year and the North Central Conference Coach of the Year twice.

=== Texas-Arlington ===
Starting in 1989, George coached the Texas-Arlington volleyball team. George coached there for five seasons, finishing with a record of 93-74. She was a three-time Southland Conference Coach of the Year.

The 1989 team finished third in the NCAA tournament, a school record, and she became the first female to coach in the Final Four.

=== Western Michigan ===
George began coaching Western Michigan in 1994. She coached for eleven seasons, culminating in a 185-139 overall record.

She was the MAC coach of the year in 2000; the team made the NCAA tournament that year.

=== Michigan State ===
George started coaching the Michigan State volleyball team in 2005. She said that it was always her dream to coach in the Big Ten. She was announced as the head coach a week after Chuck Erbe retired. The team was ranked ninth in the Big Ten preseason polls. She retired at the end of the 2021 season, being the winningest coach in program history, with a record of 302-233. She also led the Spartans to 10 NCAA Appearances.

=== Grand Rapids Rise ===
In March 2023, George was named the inaugural head coach of the Pro Volleyball Federation's team in western Michigan which would be named the Grand Rapids Rise in April 2023.

== Head coaching record ==
Record table
Season	Team	Overall	Conference	Standing	Postseason
North Dakota State Bison () (1987–1988)
1987	North Dakota State	44-8	-		Division II NCAA Fifth Place
1988	North Dakota State	43-3	-		Division II NCAA Third Place
North Dakota State:		87-11 (.888)			
UT Arlington Mavericks (Southland Conference) (1989–1993)
1989	UT Arlington	31-4	7-0	1st	NCAA National semifinals
1990	UT Arlington	18-19	7-0	1st	NCAA first round
1991	UT Arlington	13-18	8-1	2nd	
1992	UT Arlington	20-14	9-0	1st	
1993	UT Arlington	11-19	6-3	T-4th	
UT Arlington:		93-74 (.557)	37-4 (.902)		
Western Michigan Broncos (Mid-American Conference) (1994–2004)
1994	Western Michigan	10-16	6-11	7th	
1995	Western Michigan	8-20	5-12	8th	
1996	Western Michigan	20-8	10-7	3rd	
1997	Western Michigan	13-15	9-7	3rd	
1998	Western Michigan	19-13	11-7	3rd	
1999	Western Michigan	25-7	15-3	2nd	
2000	Western Michigan	25-6	17-1	1st	NCAA first round
2001	Western Michigan	15-11	10-8	4th	
2002	Western Michigan	14-18	8-10	3rd	
2003	Western Michigan	17-14	8-8	3rd	
2004	Western Michigan	19-11	11-5	2nd	
Western Michigan:		185-139 (.571)	110-79 (.582)		
Michigan State Spartans (Big Ten Conference) (2005–present)
2005	Michigan State	12-18	5-15	9th	
2006	Michigan State	19-12	10-10	6th	NCAA first round
2007	Michigan State	21-14	10-10	5th	NCAA regional semifinal
2008	Michigan State	15-16	7-13	7th	
2009	Michigan State	17-16	5-15	10th	NCAA first round
2010	Michigan State	15-16	7-13	9th	
2011	Michigan State	22-12	10-10	6th	NCAA second round
2012	Michigan State	25-10	11-9	6th	NCAA regional semifinal
2013	Michigan State	23-12	10-10	7th	NCAA regional semifinal
2014	Michigan State	19-14	11-9	7th	NCAA second round
2015	Michigan State	19-14	10-10	7th	NCAA second round
2016	Michigan State	25-9	13-7	5th	NCAA second round
2017	Michigan State	23-9	14-6	4th	NCAA Regional finals
2018	Michigan State	17-16	5-15	T-9th	
2019	Michigan State	15-15	6-14	9th	
2020	Michigan State	3-12	3-12	T-12th	
2021	Michigan State	11-18	4-16	T-11th	
Michigan State:		301-233 (.564)	141-180 (.439)		
Total:		666-457 (.593)			
National champion Postseason invitational champion Conference regular season champion Conference regular season and conference tournament champion Division regular season champion Division regular season and conference tournament champion Conference tournament champion
