= Arlington =

Arlington most often refers to:

- Arlington County, Virginia, a suburb of Washington, D.C.
  - Arlington National Cemetery, a United States military cemetery in Arlington County, Virginia
- Arlington, Texas, a city

Arlington may also refer to:

== Places ==
=== Australia ===
- Arlington light rail station, on the Inner West Light Rail in Sydney

=== Canada ===
- Arlington, Nova Scotia
- Rural Municipality of Arlington No. 79, Saskatchewan
- Arlington, Yukon

=== South Africa ===
- Arlington, Free State

=== United Kingdom ===
- Arlington, Devon
- Arlington, East Sussex
- Arlington, Gloucestershire
- Arlington Road, London

=== United States ===
- Arlington, Alabama
- Arlington, Arizona
- Arlington, California
- Arlington, Colorado
- Arlington (Jacksonville), a geographical section east of downtown Jacksonville, Florida
- Arlington, Georgia
- Arlington, Illinois
- Arlington, Monroe County, Indiana
- Arlington, Rush County, Indiana
- Arlington, Iowa
- Arlington, Kansas
- Arlington, Kentucky
- Arlington, Baltimore, Maryland
- Arlington, Massachusetts, a town in Middlesex County
- Arlington station (MBTA), on the Green Line, Boston, Massachusetts
- Arlington Township, Michigan
- Arlington, Minnesota
- Arlington, Missouri
- Arlington, Nebraska
- Arlington, New Jersey
- Arlington, New York
- Arlington, Staten Island, New York, a neighborhood
- Arlington, North Carolina
- Arlington, Ohio, a village in Hancock County
- Arlington, Montgomery County, Ohio, an unincorporated community
- Arlington, Oregon
- Arlington (Pittsburgh), Pennsylvania, a neighborhood
- Arlington, South Dakota
- Arlington, Tennessee
- Arlington, Texas
- Arlington, Vermont
- Arlington, Northampton County, Virginia
- Arlington, Washington
- Arlington, Harrison County, West Virginia
- Arlington, Upshur County, West Virginia
- Arlington (town), Wisconsin
- Arlington, Wisconsin, a village
- Upper Arlington, Ohio, a city in Franklin County

== Historic homes ==
- Arlington (Columbia, Maryland), a historic plantation
- Arlington (Westover, Maryland), a historic home
- Arlington (Natchez, Mississippi), a historic house
- Arlington Antebellum Home & Gardens in Birmingham, Alabama
- Arlington House, The Robert E. Lee Memorial in Arlington County, Virginia

== Ships ==
- SS Arlington, a steamship that sank in Lake Superior in 1940
- USS Arlington (APA-129), a Haskell-class attack transport
- USS Arlington (AGMR-2), a command ship
- USS Arlington (LPD-24), a San Antonio-class amphibious transport dock

== Other uses ==
- Arlington (band), an American rock group from Southern California
- Arlington (novel), an 1832 novel by Thomas Henry Lister
- "Arlington" (song), by Trace Adkins, 2005
- Arlington Steward, a character in the 2009 American psychological thriller film The Box
- Baron Arlington, a title
- The Arlington, a mixed-use skyscraper in Charlotte, North Carolina, U.S.
- Arlington (restaurant), a restaurant in London

== People with the given name ==
- Sir Arlington Butler (1938–2017), Bahamian teacher, lawyer, and politician
- Arlington Hambright (born 1996), American football player
- Arlington Nelson Lindenmuth (1856–1950), American landscape and portrait painter
- Arlington G. Reynolds (1849–1934), Republican politician from Ohio who was Speaker of the Ohio House of Representatives from 1900 to 1901
- Arlington Valles (1886–1970), Academy Award-winning Hollywood costume designer from London
- Arlington P. Van Dyke (1926–1990), American businessman and politician from New York

== See also ==
- Arlington Archeological Site in Northampton County, Virginia
- Arlington Fleet Group, rail maintenance and repair company based in Eastleigh Works, Hampshire, United Kingdom
- Arlington Heights (disambiguation)
- Arlington High School (disambiguation)
- Arlington Hotel (disambiguation)
- Arlington House (disambiguation)
- Arlington Plantation (disambiguation)
- Arlington Stadium, former home of Major League Baseball's Texas Rangers
- Arlington station (disambiguation), railway stations and other places with similar names
- Arlington Theater, Santa Barbara, California
- Darlington (disambiguation)
- Harlington (disambiguation)
- USS Arlington, a list of U.S. naval ships
