= Arlington station =

Arlington station can refer to:

== Railway stations ==
- Arlington station (Lexington Branch), a former commuter rail station in Arlington, Massachusetts
- Arlington station (MBTA), a subway station in Boston
- Arlington MLR station, a light rail station in Sydney
- Arlington station (NJ Transit), a former commuter rail station in New Jersey
- Arlington station (PAAC), a light rail station near Pittsburgh, Pennsylvania
- Arlington station (Staten Island Railway), a former rapid transit station in New York
- Arlington Cemetery station, a Washington Metro station in Arlington, Virginia
- Arlington Heights station, a commuter rail station in Arlington Heights, Illinois
- Arlington Park station, a commuter rail station in Arlington Heights, Illinois
- Arlington Station, California, a former railway station and community in California
- Mount Arlington station, a commuter rail station in New Jersey
- West Arlington station, a former commuter rail station in New Jersey

== Other ==
- Arlington Hall (known as Arlington Hall Station), a former school and intelligence headquarters in Arlington, Virginia
- Arlington Pumping Station, a water pumping station

== See also ==
- Arlington (disambiguation)
