= Arlington Plantation =

Arlington Plantation or Arlington Plantation House may refer to:

== United States ==
- Arlington Plantation House (Franklin, Louisiana), listed on the National Register of Historic Places (NRHP) in St. Mary Parish
- Arlington Plantation (Lake Providence, Louisiana), NRHP-listed in East Carroll Parish
- Arlington Plantation House (Washington, Louisiana), NRHP-listed in St. Landry Parish
- Arlington Antebellum Home & Gardens (Birmingham, Alabama), listed on the National Register of Historic Places (NRHP)
- Arlington Plantation, site of Arlington House, The Robert E. Lee Memorial, in Arlington, Virginia
- Arlington Plantation, now the Arlington Archeological Site, in Northampton County, Virginia

== See also ==
- Arlington (disambiguation)
- Arlington (Natchez, Mississippi)
