= Hugh Rhea =

American football player and track athlete (1909–1973)

No. 25
- Positions: Guard, Tackle

Personal information
- Born: September 9, 1909; Arlington, Nebraska, U.S.
- Died: October 18, 1973 (aged 64); Alachua County, Florida, U.S.
- Listed height: 6 ft 3 in (1.91 m)
- Listed weight: 225 lb (102 kg)

Career information
- High school: Arlington (NE)
- College: Nebraska

Career history
- Brooklyn Dodgers (1933)

Awards and highlights
- First-team All-American (1930); Third-team All-American (1931); 2× First-team All-Big Six (1930, 1931)
- Stats at Pro Football Reference

Hugh McCall Rhea (September 9, 1909 – October 18, 1973) was an American football player and track and field athlete.

A native of Arlington, Nebraska, Rhea attended Arlington High School and the University of Nebraska–Lincoln. He played college football for the Nebraska Cornhuskers football team and was twice selected as an All-American tackle. In 1930, he was selected as a first-team All-American by Grantland Rice for Collier's Weekly, and in 1931, he was selected as a third-team All-American by the Associated Press.

Rhea also competed in track and field for the Nebraska Cornhuskers, winning the shot put event at the 1932 NCAA Men's Track and Field Championships with an NCAA record-setting throw of 52 feet, 5¾ inches. He later played two games as a guard in professional football for the Brooklyn Dodgers during the 1933 NFL season. Rhea died in Florida in 1973 at age 64, and he was posthumously inducted into the Nebraska Football Hall of Fame in 1986.
