= 2026 Penn State Nittany Lions women's volleyball team =

American college volleyball season

2026 Penn State Nittany Lions women's volleyball
- Conference: Big Ten Conference
- Record: 22–5 (14–3 Big Ten)
- Head coach: Katie Schumacher-Cawley (5th season)
- Assistant coaches: Brian Toron (5th season); Megan Hodge Easy (4th season); Abby Detering (1st season)
- Captains: Kennedy Martin; Jocelyn Nathan; Alexis Stucky
- Home arena: Rec Hall

2026 Big Ten women's volleyball standings
| | Conf. | | | | Overall |
| Team | W | | L | PCT | W | | L | PCT |
|---|---|---|---|---|---|---|---|---|
| No. 1 Nebraska† ‍‍‍ | 17 | – | 0 | 1.000 | 28 | – | 0 | 1.000 |
| No. 12 Oregon ‍‍‍ | 14 | – | 3 | .824 | 23 | – | 4 | .852 |
| No. 7 Penn State ‍‍‍ | 14 | – | 3 | .824 | 22 | – | 5 | .815 |
| No. 9 Wisconsin ‍‍‍ | 14 | – | 3 | .824 | 20 | – | 7 | .741 |
| No. 13 Purdue ‍‍‍ | 11 | – | 6 | .647 | 18 | – | 8 | .692 |
| No. 18 Minnesota ‍‍‍ | 11 | – | 6 | .647 | 17 | – | 8 | .680 |
| Illinois ‍‍‍ | 10 | – | 7 | .588 | 18 | – | 10 | .643 |
| No. 22 Washington ‍‍‍ | 9 | – | 8 | .529 | 18 | – | 8 | .692 |
| No. 25 UCLA ‍‍‍ | 9 | – | 8 | .529 | 18 | – | 10 | .643 |
| No. 23 Indiana ‍‍‍ | 9 | – | 8 | .529 | 16 | – | 10 | .615 |
| Michigan State ‍‍‍ | 8 | – | 9 | .471 | 18 | – | 9 | .667 |
| Michigan ‍‍‍ | 7 | – | 10 | .412 | 16 | – | 12 | .571 |
| USC ‍‍‍ | 5 | – | 12 | .294 | 11 | – | 16 | .407 |
| Maryland ‍‍‍ | 4 | – | 13 | .235 | 14 | – | 14 | .500 |
| Rutgers ‍‍‍ | 4 | – | 13 | .235 | 13 | – | 16 | .448 |
| Ohio State ‍‍‍ | 4 | – | 13 | .235 | 11 | – | 16 | .407 |
| Iowa ‍‍‍ | 2 | – | 15 | .118 | 13 | – | 18 | .419 |
| Northwestern ‍‍‍ | 1 | – | 16 | .059 | 8 | – | 20 | .286 |
† – Conference champion + – At-large invitation to the 2026 NCAA tournament Rankings from AVCA Coaches Poll; Source:The Big Ten

The 2026 Penn State Nittany Lions women's volleyball team represents Pennsylvania State University for the 2026 NCAA Division I women's volleyball season. The Nittany Lions are led by fifth-year head coach Katie Schumacher-Cawley and play their home matches at Rec Hall in University Park, Pennsylvania. They are members of the Big Ten Conference.

Penn State began the season ranked tenth in the AVCA preseason poll. The Nittany Lions lost to eleventh-ranked SMU in an exhibition at Spikes Under the Lights in Arlington, Texas, then swept the Penn State Invitational to open the regular season. On September 6, they lost to third-ranked Kentucky in four sets in front of 43,067 fans at Wrigley Field as part of the Big Ten/SEC Challenge. Five days later, Penn State swept fourth-ranked Stanford at the Palestra in Philadelphia.

After starting Big Ten play 1–2, including a home sweep by top-ranked Nebraska, the Nittany Lions won eight of their next nine conference matches, including wins over tenth-ranked Oregon, eighteenth-ranked Indiana and eleventh-ranked Purdue. They entered November 17–5 overall and 9–3 in conference play.

Penn State vs. Kentucky at Wrigley Field on September 6, 2026

== Previous season ==
The Nittany Lions entered the 2025 season as the defending national champions. They finished the regular season 18–12 overall and 12–8 in Big Ten play, placing sixth in the conference. Penn State received an at-large bid to the NCAA tournament, extending its streak as the only program to appear in every edition of the tournament. They defeated South Florida in the first round before losing to top-seeded Texas in the second round, finishing 19–13.

== Offseason ==
=== Outgoing departures ===
| Name | Number | Pos. | Height | Year | Hometown | Reason for departure |
|---|---|---|---|---|---|---|
| Jordan Hopp | 5 | MB | 6'2" | Graduate | Alliance, NE | Graduated |
| Addie Lyon | 7 | S | 5'9" | Graduate | O'Fallon, MO | Graduated |
| Maggie Mendelson | 44 | MB | 6'5" | Senior | North Ogden, UT | Graduated |

=== Outgoing transfers ===
| Name | Pos. | Height | Year | Hometown | New Team | Source |
|---|---|---|---|---|---|---|
| Catherine Burke | MB | 6'3" | (redshirt) Sophomore | Glenview, IL | Wake Forest | |
| Marin Collins | OH | 6'3" | Freshman | Lake View, NY | Georgia | |
| Kate Lally | DS | 5'9" | (redshirt) Sophomore | State College, PA | | |
| Izzy Starck | S | 6'1" | Sophomore | Viera, FL | Pittsburgh | |
| Karis Willow | OH | 6'4" | Junior | Arlington, OH | Rutgers | |

=== Incoming transfers ===
| Name | Pos. | Height | Year | Hometown | Previous Team | Source |
|---|---|---|---|---|---|---|
| Ryla Jones | MB | 6'2" | Junior | Oxon Hill, MD | Pittsburgh | |
| Whitney Lauenstein | OH | 6'2" | (redshirt) Senior | Waverly, NE | Texas | |
| Alexis Stucky | S | 6'2" | (redshirt) Senior | Laramie, WY | Florida | |

=== Incoming recruits ===
2026 Penn State Recruits
| Name | Pos. | Height | Hometown | High School |
|---|---|---|---|---|
| Hayley Burgdorf | OH | 6'0" | St. Charles, IL | St. Charles North |
| Finley Krystkowiak | OH | 6'4" | San Diego, CA | Torrey Pines |
| Kendall Northern | MB | 6'1" | Cincinnati, OH | Summit Country Day |
| Danielle Whitmire | S | 6'2" | Prosper, TX | Walnut Grove |

== Roster ==
2026 Penn State Nittany Lions Roster
| Libero/Defensive Specialists: 2 Ava Falduto – Junior; 9 Lexi Gin – Sophomore; 10 Ava Jurevicius – Sophomore; 11 Jocelyn Nathan – Senior; Setters: 3 Danielle Whitmire – Freshman; 5 Alexis Stucky – (redshirt) Senior | Middle Blockers: 1 Kendall Northern – Freshman; 7 Ryla Jones – Junior; 8 Gabrielle Nichols – Sophomore | Outside Hitters: 13 Emmi Sellman – Junior; 23 Hayley Burgdorf – Freshman; 26 Whitney Lauenstein – (redshirt) Senior; 27 Alexis Ewing – Sophomore; 42 Finley Krystkowiak – Freshman; Opposite Hitters: 8 Caroline Jurevicius – (redshirt) Junior; 18 Kennedy Martin – Senior |

=== Coaches ===
2026 Penn State Nittany Lions Coaching Staff
- Katie Schumacher-Cawley – head coach – 5th year
- Brian Toron – assistant coach – 5th year
- Megan Hodge Easy – assistant coach – 4th year
- Abby Detering – assistant coach – 1st year

=== Support staff ===
2026 Penn State Nittany Lions Support Staff
- Sarah Tischler – director of operations
- Evan Troncoso – performance analyst
- Scott Campbell – athletic trainer
- Caitie Mayo – athletic performance coach

== Schedule ==
| Date time, TV | Rank^{#} | Opponent^{#} | Result | Record | Site (attendance) city, state |
Non-conference regular season
| August 27†; 9:00 pm, TNT | No. 10 | vs. No. 11 SMU (exh.); Spikes Under the Lights | L 0–2 (22–24, 18–21) | — | AT&T Stadium; Arlington, TX |
| August 29*; 4:00 pm, BTN | No. 10 | UConn; Penn State Invitational | W 3–0 (25–14, 25–21, 25–18) | 1–0 | Rec Hall (3,594); University Park, PA |
| August 30*; 10:00 am, B1G+ | No. 10 | High Point; Penn State Invitational | W 3–2 (20–25, 25–13, 25–19, 24–26, 15–10) | 2–0 | Rec Hall (3,314); University Park, PA |
| August 30*; 6:00 pm, B1G+ | No. 10 | Hofstra; Penn State Invitational | W 3–0 (25–20, 25–9, 25–23) | 3–0 | Rec Hall (3,314); University Park, PA |
| September 6*; 7:00 pm, Fox | No. 13 | vs. No. 3 Kentucky; Big Ten/SEC Challenge | L 1–3 (23–25, 21–25, 25–23, 15–25) | 3–1 | Wrigley Field (43,067); Chicago, IL |
| September 7*; 4:00 pm, ESPNU | No. 12 | at DePaul | W 3–0 (25–23, 27–25, 25–21) | 4–1 | McGrath–Phillips Arena (1,075); Chicago, IL |
| September 11*; 6:00 pm, BTN | No. 12 | vs. No. 4 Stanford | W 3–0 (27–25, 25–20, 25–21) | 5–1 | The Palestra (3,493); Philadelphia, PA |
| September 12*; 7:00 pm, B1G+ | No. 12 | Ohio | W 3–0 (25–21, 25–23, 25–9) | 6–1 | Rec Hall (3,429); University Park, PA |
| September 15*; 7:00 pm, FS1 | No. 9 | Villanova | W 3–1 (25–14, 19–25, 25–23, 25–18) | 7–1 | Rec Hall (1,456); University Park, PA |
| September 18*; 6:00 pm, BTN | No. 9 | South Florida; Penn State Classic | W 3–0 (25–18, 25–23, 26–24) | 8–1 | Rec Hall (2,214); University Park, PA |
| September 20*; 2:00 pm, BTN | No. 9 | No. 16 Tennessee; Penn State Classic | L 1–3 (19–25, 23–25, 25–20, 20–25) | 8–2 | Rec Hall (4,063); University Park, PA |
Big Ten regular season
| September 25; 7:00 pm, B1G+ | No. 14 | at Michigan | W 3–1 (23–25, 25–17, 25–13, 25–13) | 9–2 (1–0) | Crisler Center (2,865); Ann Arbor, MI |
| September 27; 2:00 pm, BTN | No. 14 | at Michigan State | L 1–3 (19–25, 21–25, 25–22, 19–25) | 9–3 (1–1) | Breslin Center (2,481); East Lansing, MI |
| October 1; 7:00 pm, BTN | No. 16 | No. 1 Nebraska | L 0–3 (20–25, 17–25, 18–25) | 9–4 (1–2) | Rec Hall (5,450); University Park, PA |
| October 3; 7:00 pm, B1G+ | No. 16 | Iowa | W 3–1 (22–25, 25–17, 25–22, 25–19) | 10–4 (2–2) | Rec Hall (3,766); University Park, PA |
| October 9; 7:30 pm, B1G+ | No. 18 | Northwestern | W 3–0 (25–18, 25–17, 25–19) | 11–4 (3–2) | Rec Hall (3,727); University Park, PA |
| October 11; 12:00 pm, BTN | No. 18 | No. 20 Washington | W 3–0 (25–14, 25–19, 25–23) | 12–4 (4–2) | Rec Hall (3,218); University Park, PA |
| October 16; 10:00 pm, B1G+ | No. 15 | at UCLA | L 2–3 (20–25, 25–15, 25–17, 24–26, 12–15) | 12–5 (4–3) | Pauley Pavilion (1,332); Los Angeles, CA |
| October 17; 7:00 pm, BTN | No. 15 | at USC | W 3–0 (25–17, 25–23, 25–19) | 13–5 (5–3) | Galen Center (3,267); Los Angeles, CA |
| October 23; 7:00 pm, B1G+ | No. 16 | No. 10 Oregon | W 3–1 (25–17, 23–25, 25–19, 25–20) | 14–5 (6–3) | Rec Hall (3,234); University Park, PA |
| October 25; 3:00 pm, FS1 | No. 16 | at No. 18 Indiana | W 3–1 (25–16, 22–25, 25–16, 25–21) | 15–5 (7–3) | Wilkinson Hall (2,540); Bloomington, IN |
| October 29; 7:00 pm, BTN | No. 13 | Ohio State | W 3–1 (22–25, 25–19, 25–11, 25–16) | 16–5 (8–3) | Rec Hall (2,488); University Park, PA |
| October 31; 12:30 pm, B1G+ | No. 13 | No. 11 Purdue | W 3–1 (25–17, 18–25, 25–21, 25–23) | 17–5 (9–3) | Rec Hall (3,189); University Park, PA |
| November 6; 7:00 pm, B1G+ | No. 11 | at No. 19 Minnesota | W 3–1 (25–22, 25–20, 18–25, 25–21) | 18–5 (10–3) | Maturi Pavilion (5,036); Minneapolis, MN |
| November 8; 4:00 pm, FS1 | No. 11 | at No. 7 Wisconsin | W 3–2 (20–25, 25–18, 20–25, 25–19, 15–11) | 19–5 (11–3) | UW Field House (7,229); Madison, WI |
| November 11; 7:00 pm, B1G+ | No. 10 | at Maryland | W 3–0 (25–17, 25–16, 25–15) | 20–5 (12–3) | Xfinity Center (3,407); College Park, MD |
| November 14; 9:00 pm, B1G+ | No. 10 | at No. 25 Illinois | W 3–0 (25–13, 25–20, 25–21) | 21–5 (13–3) | Huff Hall (3,526); Champaign, IL |
| November 17; 7:00 pm, B1G+ | No. 7 | Rutgers | W 3–0 (25–19, 25–19, 25–18) | 22–5 (14–3) | Rec Hall (3,247); University Park, PA |
Big Ten tournament
| November 22; 6:00 pm, BTN | No. 7 | vs. Illinois; Big Ten tournament quarterfinal | | | Fishers Event Center; Fishers, IN |
*Non-conference match. †Exhibition match; result does not count toward the team's record.^{#}Rankings from AVCA Coaches Poll at the time of the match. All times are in Eastern Time. Source:

== Rankings ==
Ranking movements Legend: ██ Increase in ranking ██ Decrease in ranking
| | Week | | | | | | | | | | | | | | | |
| Poll | Pre | 1 | 2 | 3 | 4 | 5 | 6 | 7 | 8 | 9 | 10 | 11 | 12 | 13 | 14 | Final |
|---|---|---|---|---|---|---|---|---|---|---|---|---|---|---|---|---|
| AVCA | 10 | 13 | 12 | 9 | 14 | 16 | 18 | 15 | 16 | 13 | 11 | 10 | 7 | | | |
