= Harling =

Harling may refer to:

== Places ==
- Harling, Norfolk, the parish of which East Harling is the principal settlement and include Middle Harling and West Harling
  - East Harling, a village in Norfolk, England
  - Harling Road railway station, station servicing Harling
- Harling Point, a Chinese cemetery in Victoria, British Columbia

== Other uses ==
- Harling (surname)
- Operation Harling, British World War II sabotage mission in Greece
- Harling, a kind of wall finish
- Harling, a method of boat fishing developed on the River Tay for salmon where lures and flies are drifted across and down the current by the boat.

== See also ==
- Harlington (disambiguation), several places
