= Marvin McIntyre =

Marvin McIntyre may refer to:

- Marvin H. McIntyre, U.S. Presidential Secretary 1937–1943
- USS Marvin H. McIntyre (APA-129), a Haskell-class attack transport of the U.S. Navy
