= Arlington High School =

Arlington High School can refer to one of several American high schools:

- Arlington High School (California), Riverside, California
- Arlington High School (Illinois), Arlington Heights, Illinois
- Arlington High School (Indiana), Indianapolis, Indiana
- Arlington High School (Massachusetts), Arlington, Massachusetts
- Arlington Senior High School, Saint Paul, Minnesota
- Arlington High School (Nebraska), Arlington, Nebraska
- Arlington High School (New York), LaGrange, New York
- Arlington High School (Ohio), Arlington, Ohio
- Arlington High School (Oregon), Arlington, Oregon
- Arlington High School (Tennessee), Arlington, Tennessee
- Arlington High School (Texas), Arlington, Texas
- Arlington High School (Washington), Arlington, Washington
