= San Bernardino–Riverside Line =

Railway line in California

San Bernardino–Riverside
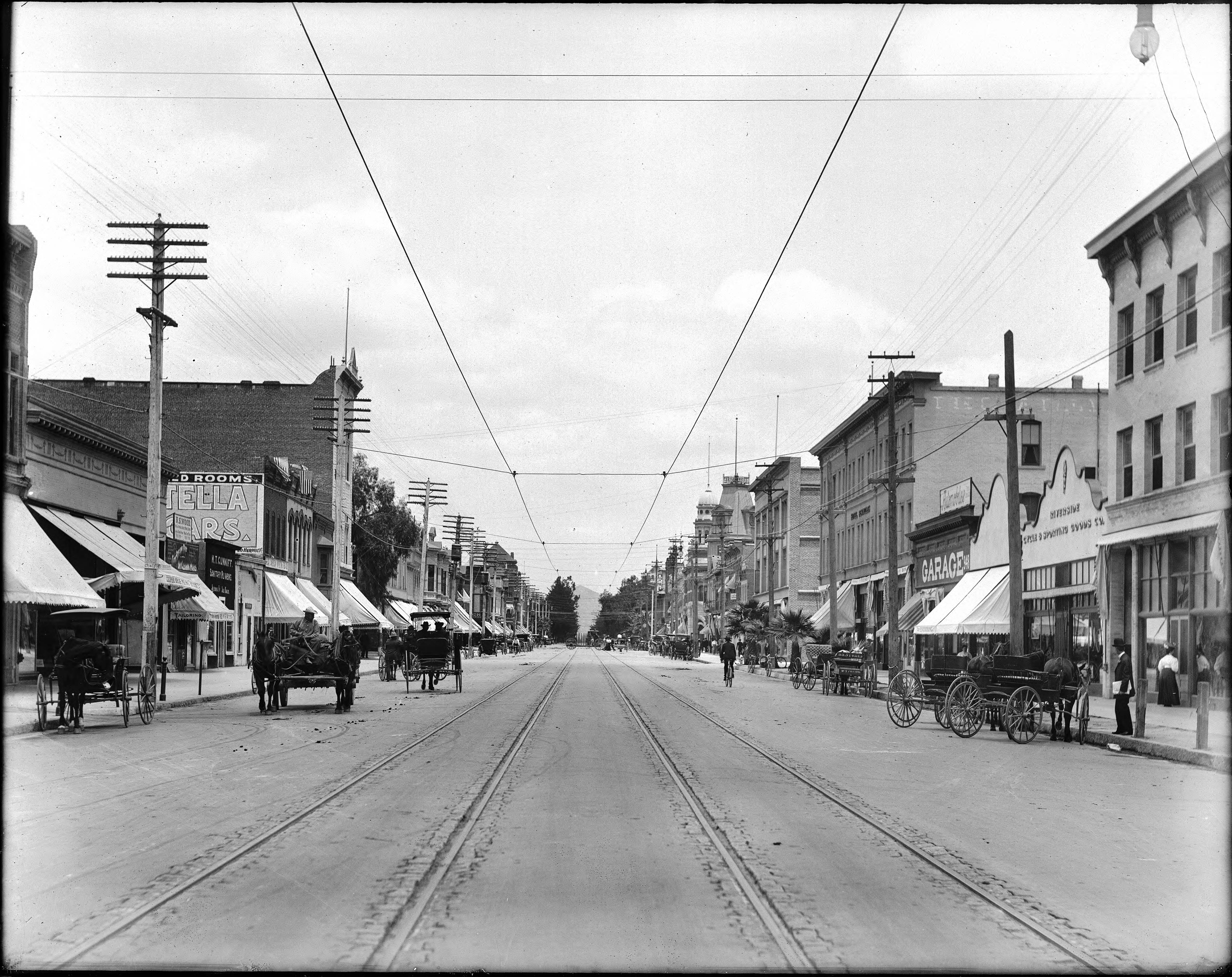
- Main Street in Riverside, c. 1905

Overview
- Locale: Inland Empire
- Termini: San Bernardino; Riverside

Service
- Type: Interurban
- System: Pacific Electric

History
- Opened: April 7, 1911
- Closed: May 7, 1939

Technical
- Number of tracks: 1–2
- Track gauge: 1,435 mm (4 ft 8 1/2 in) standard gauge
- Electrification: Overhead line, 600 V DC

The San Bernardino–Riverside is a former Pacific Electric (PE) interurban railway line in the Inland Empire. Unlike most of the company's services, trains did not travel to Downtown Los Angeles and instead provided a suburban service between San Bernardino and Riverside.

== History ==
Construction on the line north from Riverside began in 1908, but was ceased due to a disagreement between Pacific Electric owner Henry E. Huntington and Union Pacific President E. H. Harriman. Service began in Riverside on April 7, 1911, operating on Main Street, First Street, and La Cadena Drive as far north as Center Street in West Highgrove. In 1913, work began to complete the line, with an extension north to Colton opening on October 4, 1913 and finally to San Bernardino station on December 13.

By January 1916 through-routing with the Redlands Line had begun, forming the Redlands–Riverside Line. Between April and June 1928 through-routing was changed to the Riverside–Arlington Line as part of a scheme developed by the California Railroad Commission; it was reverted to Redlands after proving unsuccessful. A major service reduction took place on July 20, 1936, as through-routing was discontinued entirely and headways became sparse and irregular. By this time, service was primarily provided to interchange with transcontinental trains in Colton. Passenger cars were virtually discontinued after February 1, 1938 with a single round trip making runs at inconvenient times very early in the morning; buses took over operations along the route. The bridge over the Santa Ana River was damaged in a flood that year. The franchise run lasted until May 7, 1939 when the service was discontinued.

In 1943, the line from the Santa Ana River to Market Junction was abandoned. By this date the PE operation on the route was freight only.

== Route ==
The line originated at the joint SP-PE Station on 3rd Street in San Bernardino where connections were made to Los Angeles, Redlands, and the San Bernardino local lines. The line was single track to Riverside and shared the private way with a parallel Southern Pacific to Grand Terrace where the Pacific Electric line branched to the southeast and continued to Riverside in its own private right of way.

The line ran south from the 3rd Street Station west of and parallel to E Street past the San Bernardino Line junction to Los Angeles at Rialto Avenue, then crossed the Atchison, Topeka and Santa Fe Railway (ATSF) Redlands District track at grade just south of Rialto Avenue. The line then went past the PE shops and freight yard to cross Mill Street. The line then turned southwesterly towards Colton crossed Lytle Creek and ran north of Colton Avenue and then crossed Mount Vernon Avenue at B street.

The line turned to the south at I Street (now Valley Boulevard) and west of 9th Street, crossed the Southern Pacific Sunset Route, went past the Southern Pacific West Colton Passenger Station, and crossed the Southern Pacific West Colton Yards. The line continued to the south through open land and then across the Santa Ana River on a single-track through a steel truss bridge to the west of the SP Santa Ana River Bridge. In 1938, after Pacific Electric discontinued passenger service and due to flood damage PE and SP trains shared the Santa Ana River Bridge.

After crossing the Santa Ana River the PE line branched south-westerly leaving the joint PE-SP private right of way and continued to Riverside in its own private way. The line passed under the ATSF Third District tracks, turned southerly and ran to Riverside west of La Cadena Drive.

In Riverside, south of Spruce Street the line turned westerly at Market Junction (La Cadena Drive, north of 1st Street). and continued to Market Street.

Market Junction was the terminus of the San Bernardino–Riverside Line and was the transfer junction between the Pacific Electric, Southern Pacific, and Union Pacific railroads. From the Junction the Riverside–Rialto Line, ran to the northwest operating on the UPRR tracks to Rialto, the Riverside–Arlington Line ran to the south to Corona, and the local Riverside lines connected to Market street.

After the line from the Santa Ana River to Market Junction was abandoned in 1943, the PE operated on the SP tracks between the river and Market Junction. The joint use single track line went south to Highgrove through the orange groves east of the ATSF tracks. After crossing Columbia Avenue the line turned south-westerly, crossed the ATSF San Jacinto District tracks at-grade south of Highgrove, crossed Massachusetts Avenue then turned to the west. The line ran to the west, south of and parallel to Massachusetts Avenue, passed through Riverside Junction (west of Kansas Avenue) then turned northwesterly, crossed over the ATSF Third District tracks at-grade, then crossed La Cadena drive and joined the PE tracks at Market Junction.
