= Arlington Heights =

Arlington Heights can refer to several places in the United States:

== Towns or cities ==
- Arlington Heights, Illinois
  - Arlington Heights station
- Arlington Heights, Ohio
- Arlington Heights, Pennsylvania
- Arlington Heights, Washington

== Neighborhoods ==
- Arlington Heights, Fort Worth, Texas
- Arlington Heights, Los Angeles, California
- Arlington Heights, Pittsburgh, Pennsylvania
- Arlington Heights, Portland, Oregon
- Arlington Heights Historic District in Arlington County, Virginia
- Arlington Heights, in Arlington, California
- Arlington Heights, in Arlington, Massachusetts

== See also ==
- Village of Arlington Heights v. Metropolitan Housing Development Corp., a 1977 U.S. Supreme Court case
