= Riverside–Arlington Line =

Pacific Electric streetcar route (1893–1943)

Riverside–Arlington
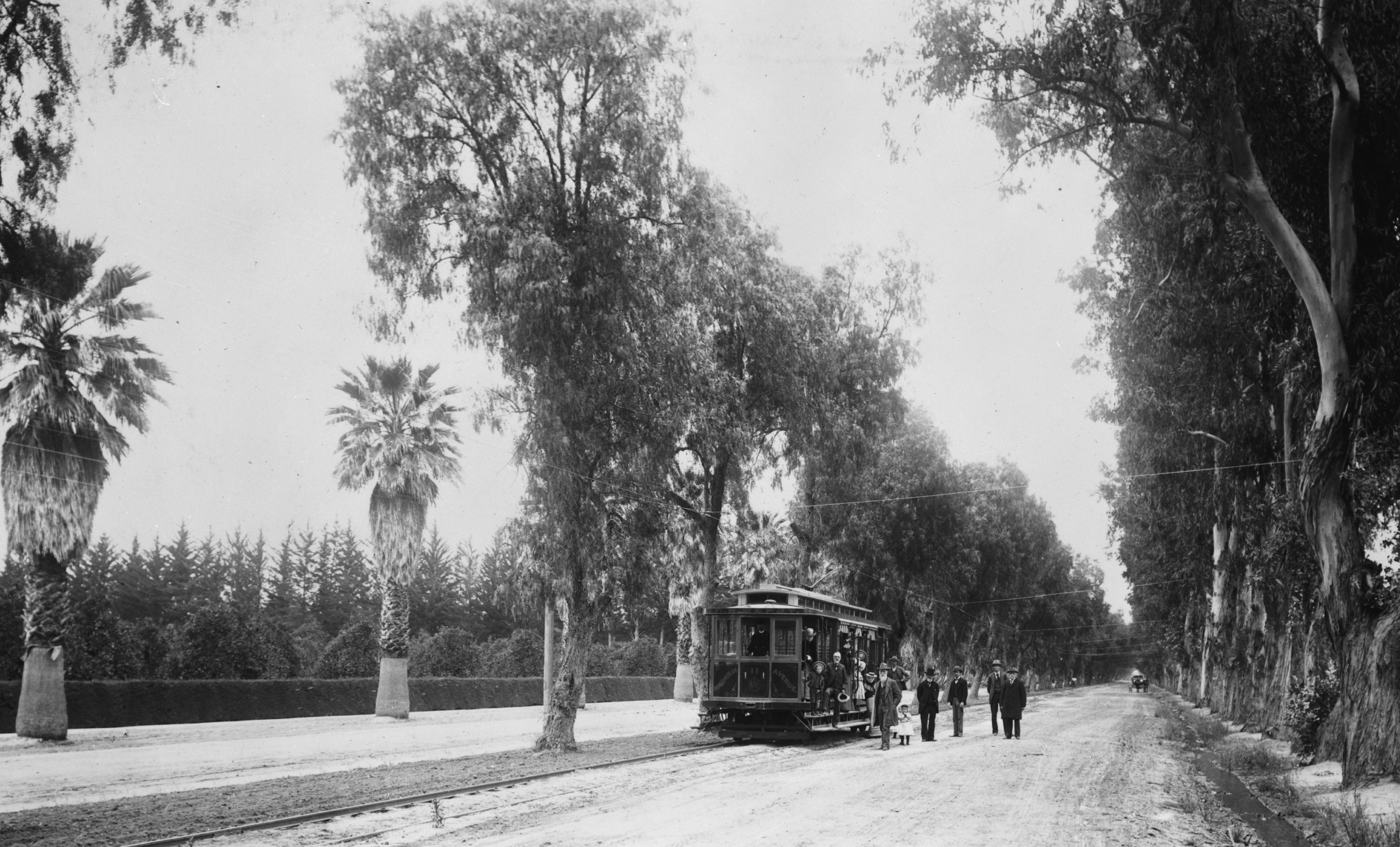
- Magnolia Avenue with Electric Streetcar in Riverside, date unknown

Overview
- Locale: Inland Empire
- Termini: Riverside; Arlington Corona (1915–1931)

Service
- Type: Interurban
- System: Pacific Electric

History
- Opened: 1893
- Closed: January 9, 1943

Technical
- Number of tracks: 1
- Track gauge: 1,435 mm (4 ft 8 1/2 in) standard gauge
- Electrification: Overhead line, 600 V DC

The Riverside–Arlington Line is a former Pacific Electric interurban railway line in the Inland Empire. The route provided suburban service between San Bernardino and Arlington with a later extension to Corona. It operated between 1893 and 1943.

== History ==
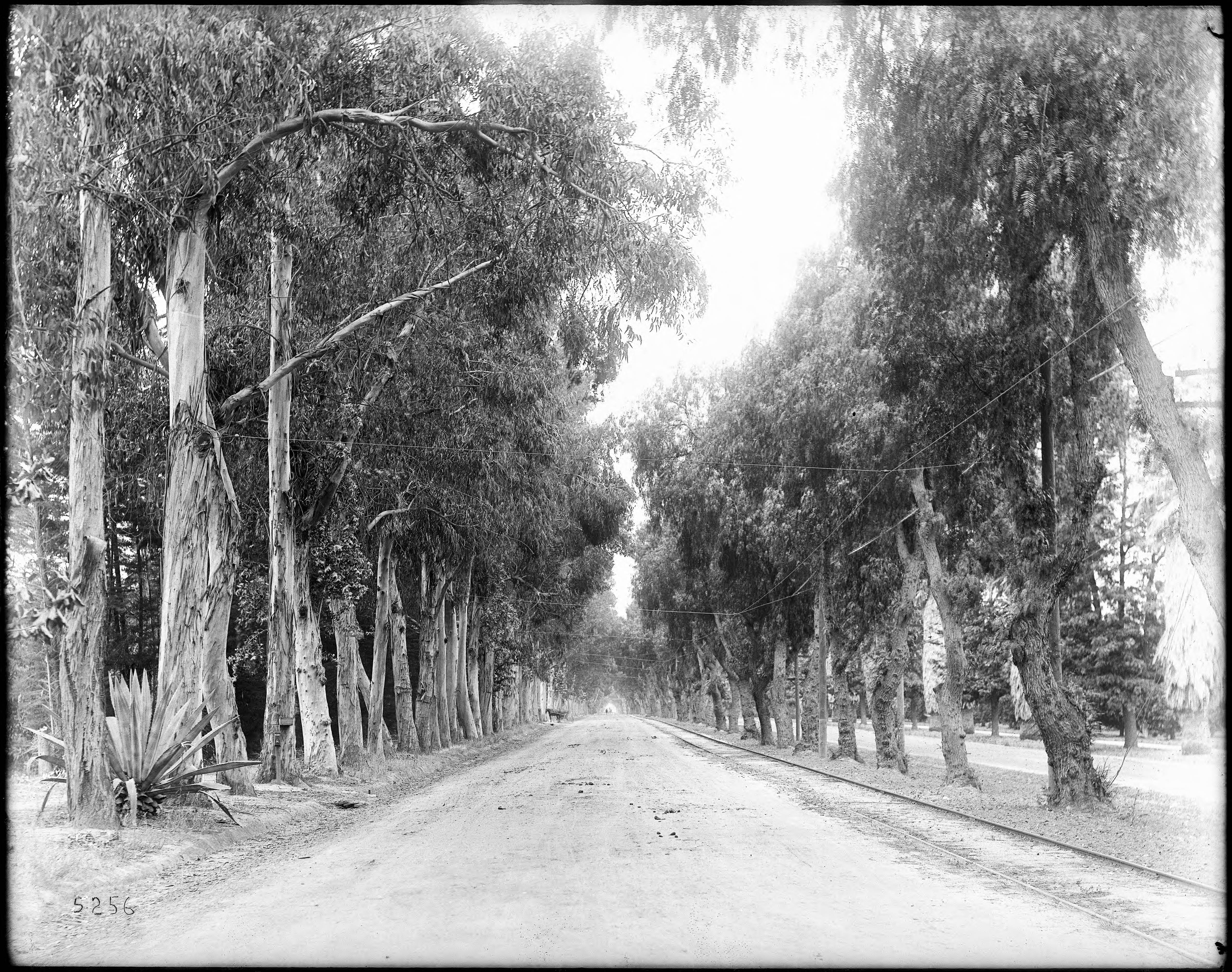
Magnolia Avenue in Riverside with tracks right of frame, c. 1900

The line was built by the Riverside & Arlington Railway Company in 1893, running between Riverside and Arlington. The route was electrified in 1899; the first car ran on April 5 with the opening gala on April 11. The Riverside & Arlington was sold to the Los Angeles Inter-Urban Electric Railway in 1904 before the route was folded into the Pacific Electric system in 1911. On October 20, 1914, the route through Riverside was simplified to only run down Main Street.

The extension to Corona opened February 17, 1915. On July 7, 1924, the Riverside–Arlington Line and Arlington–Corona Line services were split, explained as a measure to allow Birney cars on the Corona section as a power saving measure. The following week, the Arlington terminal was moved further south on the line to a new Arlington station. Between April and June 1928 the service was through-routed was with the San Bernardino–Riverside Line as part of a scheme developed by the California Railroad Commission; this was reverted after proving unsuccessful.

The Arlington–Corona Line was abandoned on August 11, 1931. Service was re-routed in Riverside to terminate at Market and Seventh by November 2 that year, a move which was reverted in 1940. In 1936, service was transferred one block west to the Market Street Local Line and the Main Street rails were removed.

By 1940, the line was the only Pacific Electric service to not operating in Los Angeles County, running isolated from the rest of the system. The line was discontinued after January 9, 1943. Ending the service during wartime required special clearance from the Office or Defense Transportation; the single track line limited capacity and closing the line freed up cars to be used elsewhere on the system.

All tracks had been removed by 1981 and most of the route had been paved over or converted to boulevard median strips.

== Route ==
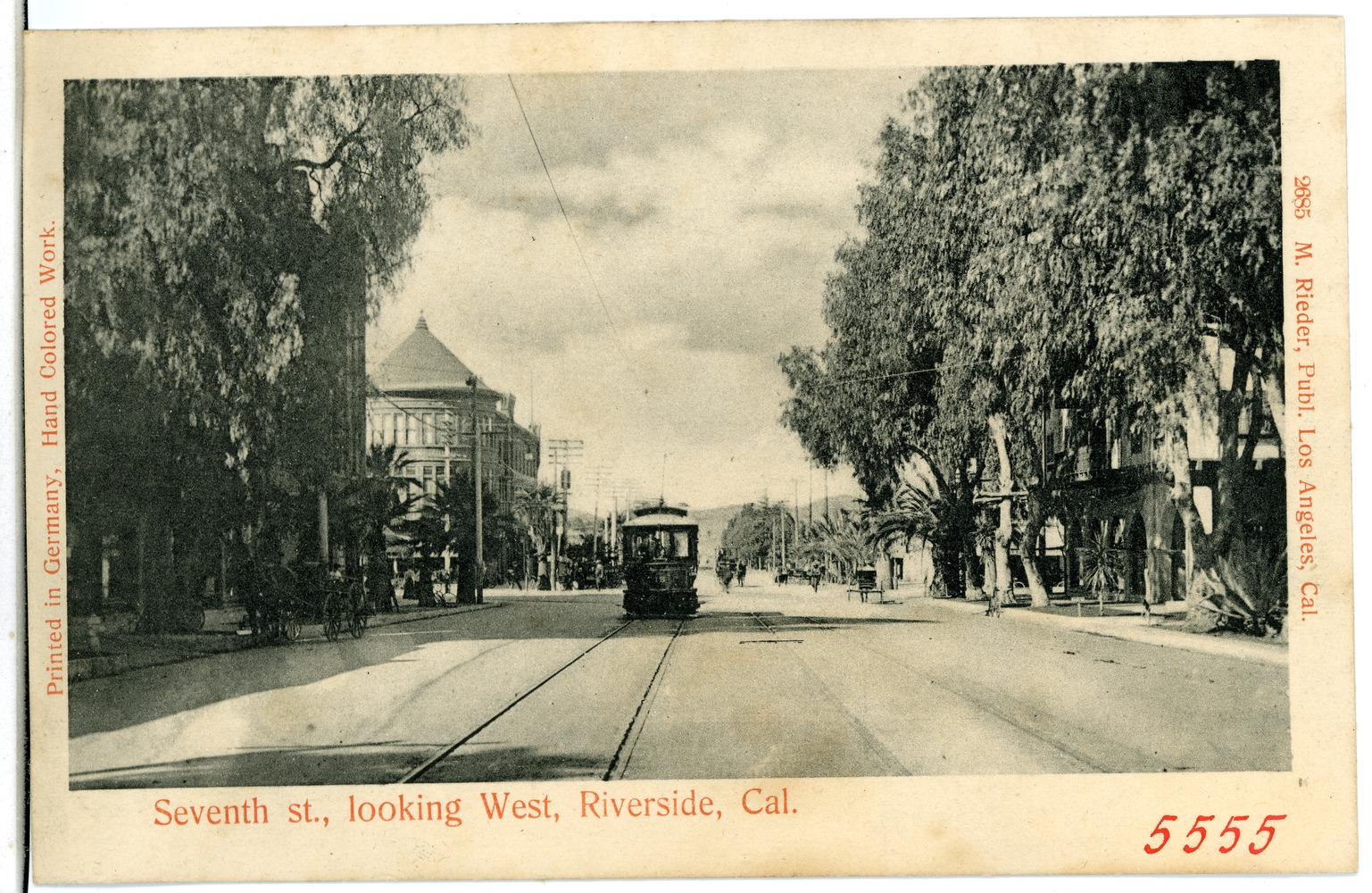
Unidentified Riverside streetcar, printed by Brück & Sohn c. 1904

From 14th Street the single track line ran south in the center of Magnolia Avenue, crossed the Union Pacific Railroad Second Subdivision (now the Los Angeles Subdivision) tracks, went past Central Avenue to Magnolia Junction at Arlington Avenue.

At Arlington Avenue the line turned southwesterly and the track entered a private right of way between the dual roadways of Magnolia Avenue. The line ran southwesterly past Casa Blanca, then past the Sherman Indian High School to Arlington. The line continued through Arlington to La Sierra, then crossed the Atchison, Topeka and Santa Fe Railway Third District (now the BNSF San Bernardino Subdivision) tracks at grade (at May) at present Corona City limits.

The line in private way on Magnolia Avenue continued to Porphyry (Home Gardens) which was an interchange junction with the ATSF. The line turned westerly and ran to the Corona Civic Center where Magnolia Avenue ended. The line then left the private way and turned southwesterly on to 3rd Street in Corona and ran down the center of 3rd Street to the terminus at Merrill Avenue.

=== Unbuilt connection to Stern ===
Henry E. Huntington, owner of the Pacific Electric, intended to connect the Corona Line to the Whittier Line via the La Habra–Fullerton–Yorba Linda Line at Stern and through the Santa Ana Canyon. After the Great Merger of 1911, surveys were carried out to establish two routes through the canyon — one on each side of the Santa Ana River.
