= Spikes Under the Lights =

2026 women's college volleyball event in Texas

Spikes Under the Lights was an exhibition women's college volleyball showcase held on August 27, 2026, at AT&T Stadium in Arlington, Texas. The tournament marked the first time a women's collegiate volleyball event was hosted inside an NFL stadium and featured four top Division I programs competing for a $1 million prize purse—the largest financial award in women's college sports history. The event was created as a primetime national showcase to highlight the growth and commercial viability of women's college volleyball.

== Overview ==
The event was created as a primetime national showcase to highlight the growth and commercial viability of women's college volleyball. Four teams participated in the tournament:

- Nebraska Cornhuskers women's volleyball (Preseason AVCA No. 1)
- Penn State (Preseason AVCA No. 10)
- SMU Mustangs women's volleyball (SMU) (Preseason AVCA No.11)
- Florida (Preseason AVCA No. 17)

== Prize Money ==
$1 million total pool distributed among participating programs, serving as a major milestone for NIL and financial opportunity in women's sports.

The tournament took place on August 27, 2026.

Semifinals; August 27
1	Nebraska	2
17	Florida	0
10	Penn State	0
11	SMU Mustangs women's volleyball	2

Championship; August 27
1	Nebraska Cornhuskers women's volleyball	2
11	SMU Mustangs women's volleyball	0
