= Sam Erger =

American volleyball player and coach

Samantha Erger
Current position
- Title: Head coach
- Team: SMU
- Conference: ACC
- Record: 121–35 (.776)

Biographical details
- Born: June 12, 1989 (age 37)
- Education: Bowling Green State University (B.A.); University of Findlay (MBA)

Playing career
- 2007–2010: Bowling Green State

Coaching career (HC unless noted)
- 2011–2012: Findlay (Graduate assistant)
- 2013: Hill College
- 2014–2021: Baylor (Associate HC)
- 2022–present: SMU

Head coaching record
- Overall: 150–44 (.773)

Accomplishments and honors

Championships
- American Athletic Conference Champions (2023); North Texas Junior College Athletic Conference Champions (2013)

Awards
- AVCA Southwest Region Coach of the Year (2025) AVCA Thirty Under 30. North Texas Junior College Athletic Conference District F Coach of the Year (2013)

Samantha "Sam" Sue Erger (née Fish; born June 12, 1989) is an American former volleyball player who is the head coach of the Southern Methodist University (SMU) women's volleyball team. She previously served as head coach at Hill College, and was an assistant coach at Baylor and University of Findlay.

== Personal life ==
Erger and her husband, James, who played basketball at Bowling Green State, have three children. Her father, Jim Fish, is a high school volleyball coach at North Branch High School in North Branch, Michigan.

== Career ==
=== Playing career ===
Erger was a setter for Bowling Green State from 2007 to 2010. She graduated ranking fifth all-time in career assists, second in single-season assists, and top 10 in career aces in the school's record book. Following graduation, she was a member of the inaugural class of the 2011 FCA Volleyball college internship program and was a 2010 American Volleyball Coaches Association Coaches for Coaches scholarship recipient. Erger graduated from Bowling Green State in 2011 with a degree in business administration and marketing.

=== Coaching career ===
Prior to being named the head coach at SMU, Erger had two collegiate coaching jobs, at Findlay (graduate assistant), before making her head coach debut at Hill College in 2013. In her sole season as head coach, she led Hill College to a 29–9 record, an NTJCAC Conference title and ended a 12-year school drought by reaching the NJCAA Division I national tournament. She was subsequently honored as the 2013 NJCAA District F Coach of the Year.

She was named as assistant coach at Baylor University in 2014. During her eight seasons at the program, she also served as the recruiting coordinator, setting coach, and was promoted to associate head coach her final two seasons.

In 2022, she was named head coach of the SMU Mustangs women's volleyball team. The team had a strong season in her debut year as head coach, finishing 3rd in conference play. In her second season, she led the team to the American Athletic Conference title and a berth into the NCAA tournament. In 2024, after SMU moved to the Atlantic Coast Conference, the team made national headlines for defeating Nebraska (then ranked number 2) in a 3–0 sweep. During conference play, SMU went on to hand top-ranked Pittsburgh its only regular season loss in five sets. SMU finished its first year in the ACC as the conference's fourth-place team.

== Head coaching record ==
Record table
Season	Team	Overall	Conference	Standing	Postseason
Hill College (North Texas Junior College Athletic Conference) (2013)
2013	Hill College	29–9		1st	National Junior College Athletic Association Division I tournament appearance
Hill College:		29–9 (.763)	– (–)		
SMU (AAC) (2022–2023)
2022	SMU	22–10	15–5	3rd	
2023	SMU	26–7	18–1	1st	NCAA Second Round
SMU (ACC) (2024–present)
2024	SMU	25–8	16–4	4th	NCAA Second Round
2025	SMU	27–6	17–3	3rd	NCAA Sweet 16
2026	SMU	21–4	13–2		
SMU:		121–35 (.776)	79–15 (.840)		
Total:		150–44 (.773)			
National champion Postseason invitational champion Conference regular season champion Conference regular season and conference tournament champion Division regular season champion Division regular season and conference tournament champion Conference tournament champion

== See also ==
- SMU Mustangs women's volleyball
