= Arlington Hotel =

Arlington Hotel may refer to:

- Arlington Hotel (Paris, Ontario), Canada
- Arlington Hotel (Hot Springs National Park), Arkansas, United States
- Arlington Hotel (Santa Barbara, California), United States
- Haleʻākala or Arlington Hotel, a former Hawaiian residence
- Arlington Hotel (Narrowsburg, New York), United States
- Arlington Hotel (Zanesville, Ohio), United States
- Arlington Hotel (Echo, Oregon), United States
- Arlington Hotel (Washington, D.C.), United States
- Arlington Hotel Open, a former PGA golf tour
