= Harling (surname) =

- Language: English

Origin
- Language: Old English
- Origin: Harlin
- Derivation: har + lin
- Meaning: herela's + descendent

Other names
- Variant form: Harlin

Harling is a surname. Notable people with the surname include:

- Sir Robert Harling (died 1435), who exerted great influence over East Harling
- Robert Harling (writer) (born 1951), American writer, film producer and director
- Robert Harling (typographer) (1910–2008), British typographer, designer, journalist, and novelist
- W. Franke Harling (1887–1958), British-American songwriter and composer
- Kaine Harling (born 1957), Australian film producer
