= Harlington =

Harlington may refer to several places in England:

- Harlington, Bedfordshire
  - Harlington Manor
- Harlington, London
- Harlington, South Yorkshire

== See also ==
- Arlington (disambiguation)
- Harlingen (disambiguation)
- Harlington-Straker Film Studio, a fictional film studio in UFO (TV series)
