= Arlington House =

Arlington House may refer to:

- Arlington House, The Robert E. Lee Memorial
- Arlington House (London), a Rowton House, originally a homeless hostel, England
- Arlington House, Margate, an apartment block in Kent, England
- Arlington House, the demolished home of Henry Bennet, 1st Earl of Arlington on the site of Buckingham Palace
- Arlington House Publishers, a former US book publisher
- Arlington Beach House, an early hotel in Saskatchewan, Canada
- Arlington Antebellum Home & Gardens or Arlington Historic House, a former plantation house near Birmingham, Alabama, US
