= USS Arlington =

USS Arlington may refer to the following ships of the United States Navy:

- USS Arlington (AP-174) was a Cape Johnson-class transport.
- USS Arlington (APA-129) was a Haskell-class attack transport that was renamed USS Marvin H. McIntyre.
- USS Arlington (AGMR-2) was previously the USS Saipan (CVL-48) and converted into a command ship and renamed Arlington (AGMR-2).
- USS Arlington (LPD-24) is a San Antonio-class amphibious transport dock currently in commission.
