= Arlington Hotel (Zanesville, Ohio) =

- U.S. National Register of Historic Places
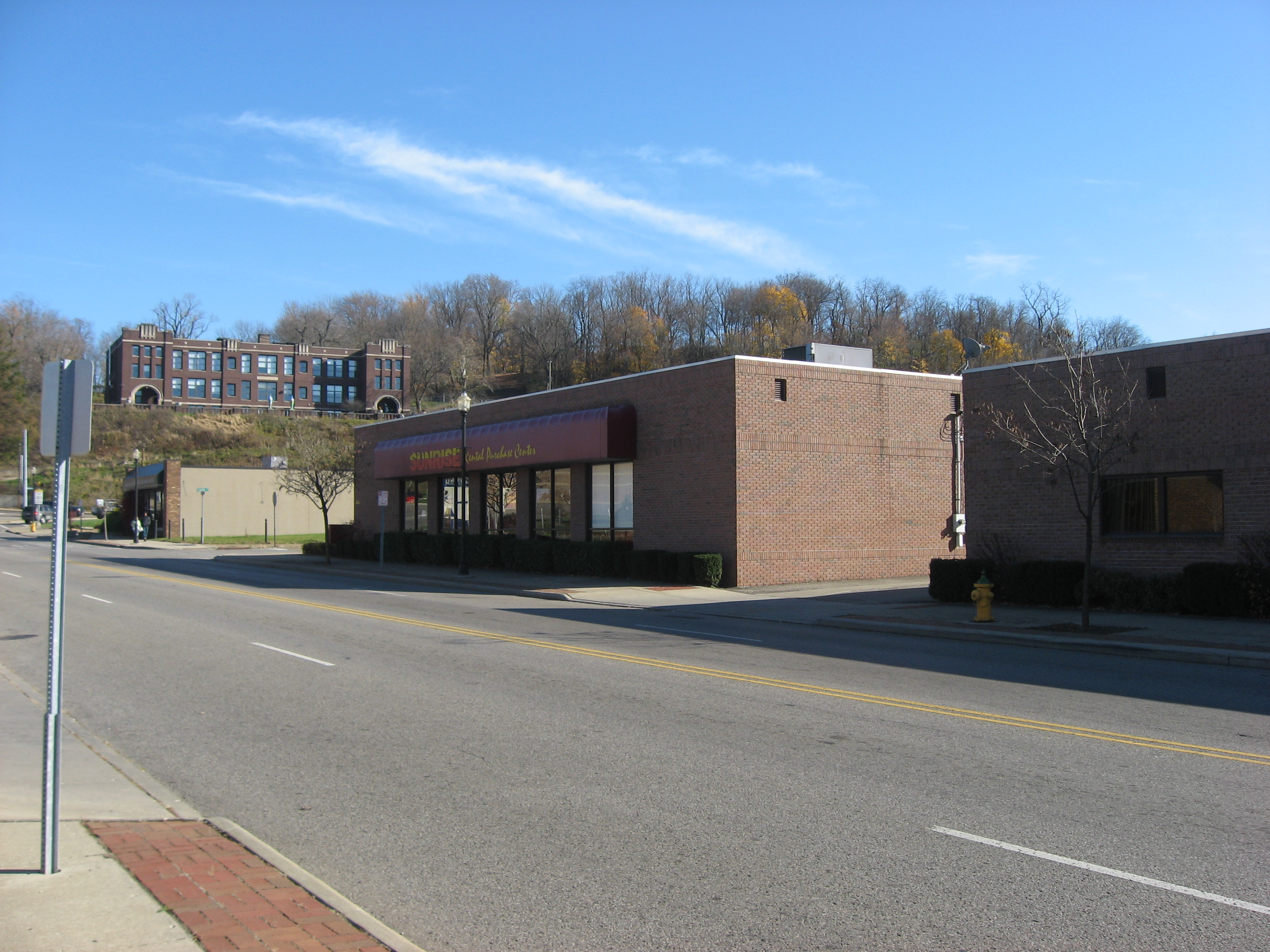
- Site of the hotel

- Location within Ohio Location within the United States
- Location: 722 Main St., Zanesville, Ohio
- Coordinates: 39°56′24″N 82°0′14″W
- Area: less than one acre
- Built: 1883
- Architect: T.B. Townsend
- Architectural style: Italianate
- NRHP reference No.: 82001482
- Added to NRHP: December 16, 1982

The Arlington Hotel was a historic hotel along U.S. Route 40 in Zanesville, Ohio, United States. Built in 1883 in the Italianate style, it was listed on the National Register of Historic Places in 1982. It has since been demolished.

An arsonist set two fires in the building in 1970, causing the evacuation of 43 guests. The hotel closed in 1980.
