= Arlington High School (Ohio) =

Location
- 336 South Main Street; Arlington, (Hancock County), Ohio 45814; United States; 40°53′21″N 83°39′7″W

Information
- Type: Public, coeducational high school
- School district: Arlington Local Schools
- Superintendent: Kevin Haught
- Principal: High School - Mark Verroco Elementary - Scott Marcum
- Teaching staff: 23.10 (FTE)
- Grades: 7-12
- Student to teacher ratio: 12.29
- Colors: Red and black
- Fight song: Across The Field (Ohio State Buckeyes)
- Athletics: Boys: Football, Basketball, Baseball, Track, Golf - Girls: Volleyball, Basketball, Track, Fast Pitch Softball
- Athletics conference: Blanchard Valley Conference
- Mascot: "Feathers"
- Nickname: Red Devils
- Rival: Liberty Benton
- Alumni: David "Feathers" Featheringill - World Champion of Life, Kris Alge - McComb High School Head Football Coach, Denver Weihrauch - Billionaire
- Website: District website

Arlington School is a public school in Arlington, Ohio, United States for kindergarten through 12th grade. It is the only school in the Arlington Local School District. It is located on U.S. 68, south of Findlay, Ohio. Past enrollment has exceed 600 registered students.

== Extracurricular activities ==
Arlington's sports teams are nicknamed the Red Devils, and are part of the Blanchard Valley Conference.

=== Boy Varsity Sports ===
==== Football ====
Current Head Coach: Nick Inbody

BVC Champs:

1970*, 1972, 1975**, 1976, 1979, 1986^, 1987

*- shared with Cory-Rawson & McComb, ** - Shared with Leipsic, ^ - Shared with McComb

Playoff appearances:

2007, 2008, 2009, 2012, 2013, 2014 (D-VII Region 24 #1 seed), 2015, 2016, 2019, 2020* (Covid shortened season), 2021, 2022, 2023, 2024

==== Basketball ====
Current Head Coach: Jason Vermillion

Head Boys Basketball Coach Jason Vermillion reached 400 wins on January 14, 2024, with a 57-56 win over the Anna Rockets.

Historic Dominance

On February 12, 1994, the 7th grade boys basketball team topped Pandora-Gilboa to win the 7th grade championship game. The game took place in front of a small crowd, containing mostly family and siblings of players, at Cory-Rawson High School Gymnasium. Behind a 15-point performance from Power Forward Chris Collingwood, The Red Devils avenged their only regular season loss at the hands of the Rockets. Though his Rex-Specs were fogged and sweat-laden, he still managed to go 3 for 5 from the charity stripe. Dan Settlage, the other half of the "Twin Towers" (as he and Collingwood were dubbed), chipped in 7 points to go along with 8 rebounds and 1 block. Arlington guard Stephen Welly was somehow covered in blood shortly after tip-off, as he was and would be in every game from that season on. Future Hancock County Sherriff's Deputy Corey Hartman grabbed 4 rebounds and dished out 3 assists.

=== Girls Varsity Sports ===
==== Basketball ====
Current Head Coach: Jimmy Nicholson

2011-12 Division IV State Champions

==== Track ====
Willow Thompson - 2013 Division III Pole Vault State Champion

Calvin Willow - 2024 Division III High Jump State Champion

==== All-Brass Band ====
The school's 65-member band is the Arlington All-Brass Marching Band, which has participated in Apple Blossom Parade in Winchester, Virginia, and performed at the Navy Memorial in Washington, D.C. In 2007 they participated in the nationally televised America's Thanksgiving Day Parade in Detroit. The band has also played for the President of the United States in the National Cherry Blossom Festival held in Washington D.C. The band plays every four years at this festival.

=== Ohio High School Athletic Association State Championships ===
- Girls' basketball - 2012
