= Harlin (surname) =

Harlin is a surname. Notable people with the surname include:

- Donald J. Harlin (1935–2015), American Air Force major general
- Renny Harlin (born 1959), Finnish film director, producer, and screenwriter
- Robert H. Harlin (1882/1883–1962), American politician
