= Arlington Pumping Station =

- U.S. National Register of Historic Places
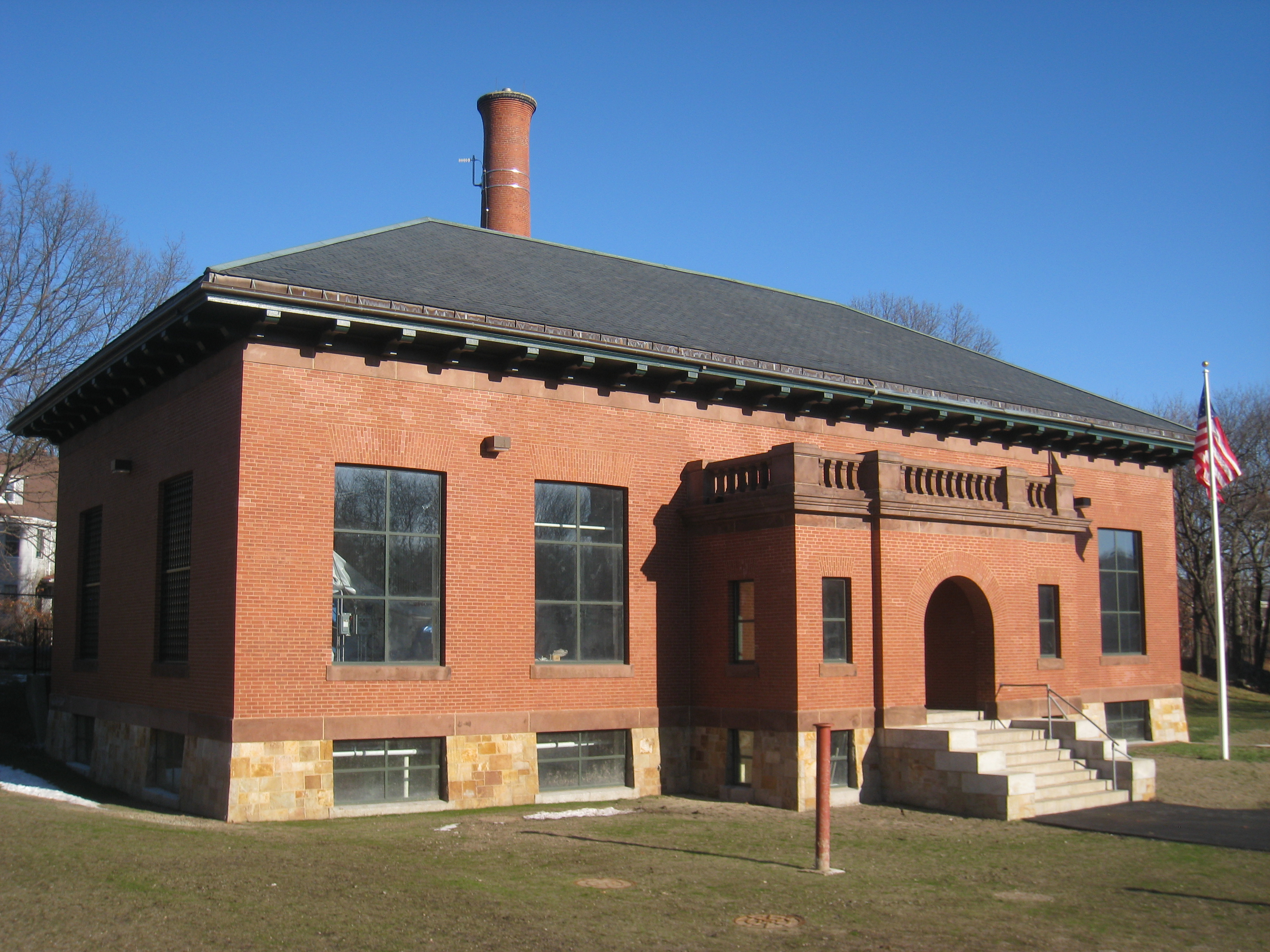

- Location within Massachusetts Location within the United States
- Location: Arlington, Massachusetts
- Coordinates: 42°25′19″N 71°10′13″W
- Built: 1907
- Architect: Dodge, C.A.
- Architectural style: Renaissance
- MPS: Arlington MRA
- NRHP reference No.: 85001022
- Added to NRHP: April 18, 1985

The Arlington Pumping Station, built in 1907, is a historic water pumping station on Brattle Court (off Brattle Street) in Arlington, Massachusetts. Its purpose was to provide water to Lexington and higher elevations in Arlington. The station was put in service on December 4, 1907.

== Design ==
The station was designed by CA Dodge & Co, with construction beginning August 23, 1906. It is a brick building 90 feet (27 m) long by 46 feet (14 m) wide, about 26 feet (7.9 m) from the ground to the cornice. The foundation walls are of Portland cement concrete, faced, where exposed on the outside below the water-table course, with seam-faced granite. Exterior walls are of dark-red faced brick, with Longmeadow brownstone trimmings, and are surmounted by a hip roof supported by steel trusses and covered with slate. The steps at the main entrance, the water-table course and the trimmings below the water-table are of pink Milford granite.

The building is subdivided by a division wall forming an engine room 48 feet (15 m) long by 40 feet (12 m) wide and 24 feet (7.3 m) high, and a boiler room 40 feet (12 m) long by 35 feet (11 m) wide and 33 feet (10 m) high. The interior facing of the engine and boiler room walls is of red brick. The engine room floor is of red quarry tile. The floors in the basement of the engine room and in the boiler and coal houses are granolithic. In the rear of the boiler room there is an underground coal pocket 33 feet (10 m) long by 27 feet (8.2 m) wide by 10 feet (3.0 m) high, covered by a reinforced concrete roof over which the side track is carried. In this roof there are 16 openings through which coal may be unloaded from the cars. The brick chimney is in the rear of the building. It is 70 feet (21 m) high and 8 feet (2.4 m) in diameter at the base, diminishing to 5 feet (1.5 m) in diameter at a point 6 feet (1.8 m) below the top. The flue is 2 feet 6 inches in diameter. The main entrance is on the front of the building. The vestibule is 7 feet (2.1 m) by 9 feet (2.7 m), and on either side of it are the office and toilet room, both 8 feet (2.4 m) by 9 feet (2.7 m), the three forming a projection from the main building 10 feet (3.0 m) by 29 feet (8.8 m).

== Pumping equipment ==
The Allis-Chalmers Company furnished the pumping equipment, which was a horizontal, cross-compound, flywheel engine fitted with Corliss valve gear, and operating two horizontal, outside packed, plunger pumps. The high and low pressure steam pistons were 14 inches and 28 inches in diameter, respectively, and the pump plungers 8% inches in diameter, all having a stroke of 18 inches. The capacity of the engine at 65 revolutions per minute was 1,500,000 gallons in twenty-four hours. The engine which was erected by the Blake & Knowles Steam Pump Works was of the horizontal, cross-compound, direct-acting type, operating two outside packed, plunger pumps. The steam cylinders were 11 inches and 22 inches in diameter, the pump plungers 12 inches in diameter, and both pistons and plungers have a stroke of 18 inches. When operated at the rate of 31 revolutions per minute the capacity was 1,500,000 gallons per day. There were two boilers of the horizontal, under-fired type, each 54 inches in diameter, containing 60 3-inch tubes 17 feet (5.2 m) long. The furnaces were fitted with Foster shaking grates, 4 feet (1.2 m) wide by 5 1/2 feet (1.7 m) long.

== See also ==
- Mystic Water Works, a pumping station in Somerville
- National Register of Historic Places listings in Arlington, Massachusetts
