= SMU Mustangs women's volleyball =

American college volleyball team

- 2026 SMU Mustangs women's volleyball team
- Founded: 1996
- University: Southern Methodist University
- Head coach: Sam Erger (5th season)
- Conference: ACC
- Location: Dallas, Texas, US
- Home arena: Moody Coliseum (capacity: 7,000)
- Nickname: Mustangs
- Colors: Red and blue

AIAW/NCAA regional semifinal
- 2025

AIAW/NCAA tournament appearance
- 2015, 2016, 2023, 2024, 2025

Conference regular season champion
- 2015, 2016, 2023

The SMU Mustangs women's volleyball team represents Southern Methodist University in NCAA Division I women's volleyball. The team competes in the Atlantic Coast Conference (ACC) and plays its home matches at Moody Coliseum in Dallas, Texas. The program began play in 1996 and is coached by Sam Erger, who took over in 2022. The Mustangs have appeared in the NCAA tournament five times, most recently in 2025, when they reached the Sweet 16 for the first time in program history.

== History ==
=== Lisa Seifert era (1996–2021) ===
SMU's first head coach was Lisa Seifert, who led the program from its first season in 1996 through 2021. She finished her career with 441 wins, the second-most of any coach at SMU. Under Seifert, the Mustangs competed in the Western Athletic Conference, Conference USA and the American Athletic Conference.

SMU won the American Athletic Conference regular season title in 2015 and made its first NCAA tournament appearance, losing to Purdue in the first round. The Mustangs repeated as conference champions in 2016 and, in the first round of the NCAA tournament, swept Texas A&M (25–23, 25–23, 25–18) for the program's first NCAA tournament win. It was also the first NCAA tournament win by an American Athletic Conference team. SMU then fell to Texas in the second round.

In 2019, SMU won the West Division of the American Athletic Conference before being swept by UCF in the conference tournament. Because of the COVID-19 pandemic, all volleyball operations were halted in March 2020, and the Mustangs did not practice for five months. Their 2020 fall season was postponed to the spring of 2021.

=== Sam Erger era (2022–present) ===
Sam Erger became head coach in 2022. In 2023, SMU opened its home schedule with a win over No. 14 Baylor, the highest-ranked win in program history at the time. The Mustangs went 18–1 in conference play to win the American Athletic Conference title and earned the No. 7 seed in the NCAA tournament, where they swept Texas State before losing to Texas in the second round.

SMU joined the ACC in 2024. In its home opener that season, SMU swept No. 2 Nebraska at Moody Coliseum. The Mustangs entered the American Volleyball Coaches Association (AVCA) Coaches Poll for the first time in program history at No. 22 and reached as high as No. 10 that season. On October 12, 2024, SMU defeated No. 1 Pittsburgh. Nebraska and Pittsburgh each suffered only one regular season loss that year, both to SMU. SMU earned a No. 2 seed in the NCAA tournament and hosted the first two rounds for the first time in program history. The Mustangs swept Wichita State in the first round before falling to Missouri in the second round.

In 2025, SMU reached No. 8 in the AVCA poll in October, a new program high, and later climbed to No. 7. The Mustangs earned a No. 2 seed in the NCAA tournament. They swept Central Arkansas with a .618 hitting percentage, a program and NCAA tournament record, and then swept Florida to reach the Sweet 16 for the first time. SMU lost to Purdue 3–1 in the regional semifinal and finished the season 27–6, tied for the most wins in program history. Four Mustangs were named AVCA All-Americans, including Malaya Jones, the program's first First Team All-American.

SMU was picked fourth in the ACC preseason coaches' poll for 2026. The Mustangs opened the season by sweeping No. 8 Texas A&M at the AVCA First Serve in Milwaukee. They also played in Spikes Under the Lights, the first volleyball event held in an NFL stadium, at AT&T Stadium in Arlington, Texas. SMU defeated No. 9 Texas for just the second time in program history and No. 3 Kentucky at the Paradise Invitational in the Bahamas. Following those wins, SMU rose to No. 5 in the AVCA poll on September 14, the highest ranking in program history. On October 7, SMU defeated No. 2 Pittsburgh on the road, handing the Panthers their first loss of the season and ending their nation-leading 58-match home winning streak. Pittsburgh won the rematch at Moody Coliseum four days later, splitting the season series. As of November 4, 2026, SMU is 18–4 overall and 10–2 in ACC play.

== Conference affiliations ==
- Western Athletic Conference (1996–2004)
- Conference USA (2005–2012)
- American Athletic Conference (2013–2023)
- Atlantic Coast Conference (2024–present)

== Coaches ==
=== Coaching history ===
Coach	Years	Overall record	Conference record	Postseason highlights
Lisa Seifert	1996–2021	441–343	244–177	NCAA Second Round (2016)
Sam Erger	2022–present	118–35	76–15	NCAA Sweet 16 (2025)

Erger's record includes the 2026 season through November 4, 2026.

=== Current coaching staff ===
Position	Name
Head coach	Sam Erger
Associate head coach	Trent Sorensen
Assistant coach	Diego Aguilar
Assistant coach	Clayton Bristow
Director of player personnel / recruiting coordinator	Christa Branson
Director of operations	Carissa Barnes

== Venue ==
SMU plays its home matches at Moody Coliseum, which has a capacity of 7,000.

=== Attendance ===
Year	Facility	Avg. attendance	Total attendance
2025	Moody Coliseum	2,022	32,351
2024	Moody Coliseum	1,721	30,976
2023	Moody Coliseum	689	9,651
2022	Moody Coliseum	673	8,753
2021	Moody Coliseum	677	9,484
2020–21*	Moody Coliseum	310	3,721
2019	Moody Coliseum	838	10,890
2018	Moody Coliseum	507	8,998
2017	Moody Coliseum	456	7,301
2016	Moody Coliseum	377	4,905
2015	Moody Coliseum	389	6,222
2014	Moody Coliseum	539	8,625
2013	Moody Coliseum	344	4,130
2012	Moody Coliseum	244	3,167

* Season played in spring 2021 due to the COVID-19 pandemic.

== Championships and postseason ==
=== Conference championships ===
- American Athletic Conference (3): 2015, 2016, 2023

=== NCAA tournament results ===
SMU has appeared in the NCAA tournament five times, with a record of 5–5.

Year	Seed	Round	Opponent	Result
2015	—	First round	Purdue	L 1–3
2016	—	First round	Texas A&M	W 3–0
2016	—	Second round	Texas	L 0–3
2023	No. 7	First round	Texas State	W 3–0
2023	No. 7	Second round	Texas	L 0–3
2024	No. 2	First round	Wichita State	W 3–0
2024	No. 2	Second round	Missouri	L 1–3
2025	No. 2	First round	Central Arkansas	W 3–0
2025	No. 2	Second round	Florida	W 3–0
2025	No. 2	Regional semifinal	Purdue	L 1–3

== Awards and honors ==
=== AVCA All-Americans ===
- Emma Clothier – 2023 (Honorable Mention)
- Celia Cullen – 2023, 2024 (Honorable Mention)
- Naya Shime – 2024 (Third Team)
- Malaya Jones – 2025 (First Team)
- Averi Carlson – 2025 (Second Team)
- Favor Anyanwu – 2025 (Honorable Mention)
- Jadyn Livings – 2025 (Honorable Mention)

=== Coaching awards ===
- Sam Erger – AVCA Southwest Region Coach of the Year (2024, 2025)

=== Conference awards ===
- Averi Carlson – ACC Setter of the Year (2025)

== Season-by-season results ==
Season	Coach	Overall	Conference	Standing	Postseason
Lisa Seifert (1996–2021)
1996	Lisa Seifert	7–24	3–13	6th WAC Mountain	—
1997	Lisa Seifert	15–19	5–9	5th WAC Pacific	—
1998	Lisa Seifert	14–17	5–9	5th WAC Mountain	—
1999	Lisa Seifert	20–13	9–5	4th WAC	—
2000	Lisa Seifert	14–17	4–12	9th WAC	—
2001	Lisa Seifert	14–13	8–5	2nd WAC East	—
2002	Lisa Seifert	12–17	6–7	3rd WAC East	—
2003	Lisa Seifert	23–7	11–2	2nd WAC East	—
2004	Lisa Seifert	14–14	5–8	3rd WAC East	—
2005	Lisa Seifert	13–16	8–7	7th C-USA	—
2006	Lisa Seifert	17–15	7–9	8th C-USA	—
2007	Lisa Seifert	16–15	6–10	9th C-USA	—
2008	Lisa Seifert	14–17	6–10	8th C-USA	—
2009	Lisa Seifert	19–12	9–7	6th C-USA	—
2010	Lisa Seifert	25–6	17–3	2nd C-USA	—
2011	Lisa Seifert	15–17	11–9	7th C-USA	—
2012	Lisa Seifert	11–20	7–9	8th C-USA	—
2013	Lisa Seifert	22–9	14–4	2nd AAC	—
2014	Lisa Seifert	26–6	15–5	2nd AAC	—
2015	Lisa Seifert	27–6	17–3	1st AAC	NCAA First Round
2016	Lisa Seifert	26–8	18–2	1st AAC	NCAA Second Round
2017	Lisa Seifert	21–11	15–5	3rd AAC	NIVC First Round
2018	Lisa Seifert	12–16	9–9	5th AAC	—
2019	Lisa Seifert	18–10	11–5	1st AAC West	—
2020	Lisa Seifert	8–6	4–4	3rd AAC West	—
2021	Lisa Seifert	18–12	14–6	4th AAC	—
Sam Erger (2022–present)
2022	Sam Erger	22–10	15–5	3rd AAC	—
2023	Sam Erger	26–7	18–1	1st AAC	NCAA Second Round
2024	Sam Erger	25–8	16–4	4th ACC	NCAA Second Round
2025	Sam Erger	27–6	17–3	3rd ACC	NCAA Regional Semifinal
2026	Sam Erger	18–4*	10–2*		

* Season in progress, as of November 4, 2026.

== See also ==
- List of NCAA Division I women's volleyball programs
