= Arlington, Northampton County, Virginia =

Unincorporated community in Virginia, US

Coordinates: 37.219838°N 76.003976°W

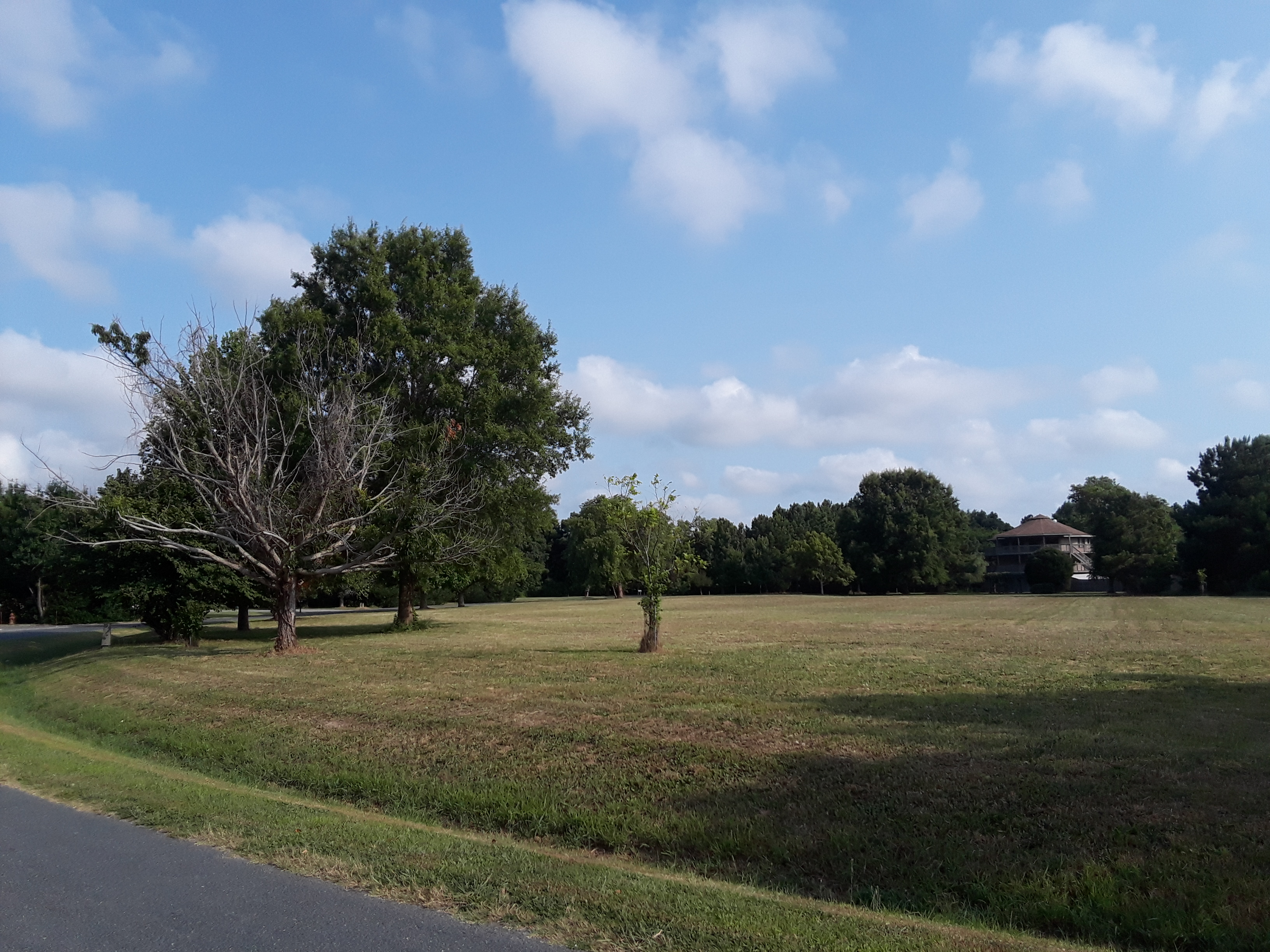
Field and house in Arlington, Northampton County, Virginia, in July 2018

Arlington is an unincorporated community south of Cape Charles in Northampton County, Virginia, United States.
