= SS Arlington =

Great Lakes steamship sunk in 1940

Coordinates: 48.458°N 87.670°W

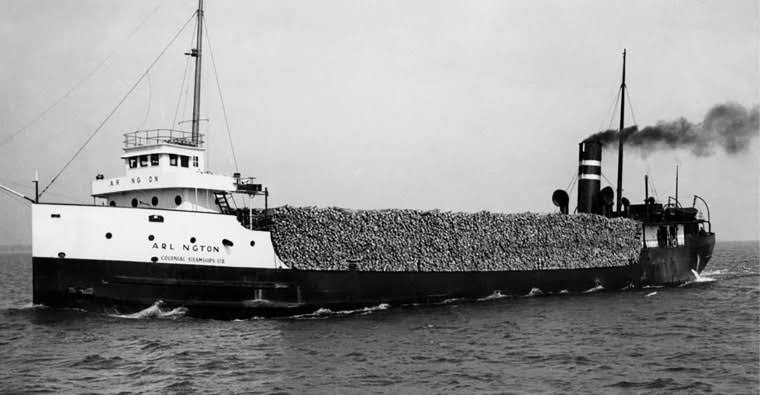
- S.S. Arlington

History

Canada
- Name: SS Arlington
- Owner: Burke Towing and Salvage Company of Midland, Ontario
- Operator: Burke Towing and Salvage Company of Midland, Ontario
- Port of registry: Canada
- Builder: Detroit Shipbuilding Company, Wyandotte, Michigan
- Laid down: 1913
- Launched: 1913
- Christened: 1913
- Completed: 1913
- Acquired: 1913
- Maiden voyage: 1913
- In service: 1913
- Out of service: 1940
- Fate: lost after breaking up in heavy seas May 1, 1940

General characteristics
- Type: Lake freighter
- Tonnage: 1,170 Net Register Tonnage; 1,870 Gross Register Tonnage
- Length: 244 ft
- Beam: 43 ft
- Draft: 17 ft
- Installed power: Coal fired triple expansion steam engine
- Speed: 10.2 knots
- Capacity: 753 tons of cargo
- Crew: 16

SS Arlington was a Great Lakes steamship which sank after breaking apart on Lake Superior on May 1, 1940. The wreck was discovered in 2023.

== Construction ==
Built in the yard of the Detroit Shipbuilding Company of Wyandotte, Michigan and intended for a career on the Great Lakes, the Arlington was a typical "canaller;" a steel-hulled, propeller-driven ship built to the specifications of the Saint Lawrence River locks as they existed at the time of her design and construction.

== History ==
The Arlington was originally designated hull No. 192 in the Detroit Shipbuilding Company's yards in 1913, was first christened the F.P. Jones, then renamed the Glencadam in 1919. The Mathews Steamship Company acquired her in 1936, and rechristened her Arlington, and the Burke Towing and Salvage Company retained the designation after purchasing her in 1936. The Burke Company employed the Arlington in the grain hauling business in spring and fall, and pulp wood during the midsummer lull in traffic. After the 1939 shipping season ended the Arlington's veteran skipper was released and the Burke Company hired Capt Frederick "Tatey Bug" Burke, brother of the ship's owners, to command the vessel for 1940.

== Final voyage ==
Having been inspected and found to be in good order prior to the beginning of the 1940 season, the Arlington entered the harbor of Port Arthur, Ontario in late April, 1940, to be loaded with a cargo of about 98,000 bushels of wheat. The ship steamed out of the port on the afternoon of April 30 shortly after the much larger Collingwood, another lake freighter. Though the Collingwood was larger and faster than the Arlington, it did not have a direction finder, which the Arlington did. So, upon entering a fog, the Collingwood's captain, Thomas J. Carson, slowed his boat and allowed the Arlington to take the lead.

Though the routine weather reports indicated seasonably mild and breezy weather with light flurries, the low-slung Arlington – having only 3.5 feet of freeboard when fully loaded – was being boarded occasionally by heavy seas. First mate Junis Macksey, a veteran ship's master in his own right, had instructed the wheelsman to follow a course along the north shore of Lake Superior, where the ship would be sheltered from the worst of the wind and waves, but where progress would be slower and less direct on its way to Whitefish Bay. Captain Burke countermanded the order, and the more direct course away from shore was resumed. First mate Macksey is said to have commented to Burke, "You just think you're going to Whitefish."

At 10:00 pm on April 30 the wind kicked up to a gale and the seas began to consistently board the Arlington. As the seas worsened and the Arlington struggled to make headway, mate Macksey, who had taken over the pilothouse watch at 12:15 am on May 1, became concerned about the state of the ship's hatches. At 12:30 am both the Arlington and the Collingwood checked their speed to about 7.5 knots, and at the same time the Arlington turned into the wind in an attempt to allow second mate Arthur Ferris to venture out onto the deck to inspect the hatches. Captain Burke awoke from his sleep, entered the pilothouse, and turned the vessel back onto its original course once again. Burke then returned to his cabin and went back to sleep. At 3:30 am mate Macksey pounded on Burke's cabin door and insisted that the captain take command of his ship while Macksey himself attempted to inspect the hatches and repair them as necessary. But when Captain Burke finally entered the pilothouse to take command, it was clear that the number 5 hatch had burst and the Arlington had begun to take on water, and to list. At this point Captain Burke finally directed the wheelsman to set a course for the north shore, so that the ship could be grounded or beached, and later salvaged.

By 4:30 am the fireman reported that the number 2 hold was filling with water, the cargo of wheat was expanding due to the dampness, the bulkhead was making cracking noises, and the hull was popping its rivets out. Chief engineer Fred Gilbert announced that the ship was sinking, and the crew took the initiative to begin abandoning the ship. The crew attempted to launch both of the ship's lifeboats – one could not be lowered into the water, but the other was successfully launched and brought around to the ship's lee, where it was sheltered from wind and waves – and the crew left the ship, all except for Captain Burke, who remained in the pilothouse. According to the log of the Collingwood, which was standing by just 250 yards away, the Arlington foundered at 5:15 am on May 1, and the lifeboat and its occupants were retrieved at 5:30 am.

== Additional context and marine inquiry ==
There is another source that depicts the fate of "The Arlington Tragedy" with more detail: R. Patrick Smith's published book "Steamboats, Sawlogs, and Salvage: The Story of Burke Family and their Near Relatives".

In 2023, the shipwreck was identified 183 metres (600 ft) below Lake Superior, about 35 miles offshore of Michigan. The ship was identified by the still readable name on the ship.
