= Arlington Plantation House (Washington, Louisiana) =

Historic house in Louisiana, United States

- U.S. National Register of Historic Places
- Location within Louisiana Location within the United States
- Nearest city: Washington, Louisiana
- Coordinates: 30°38′48″N 92°4′19″W
- Built: 1829
- Architectural style: Greek Revival
- NRHP reference No.: 82004676
- Added to NRHP: August 11, 1982

The Arlington Plantation House near Washington, Louisiana is an antebellum plantation house with an unusual design that was built in 1829. It was listed on the National Register of Historic Places in 1982.

It is a two-story brick and frame house, with common bond brick walls on the sides and on the first story of the front. Its unusual feature is the one-bay three-story front porch on the front five-bay facade. The porch is made of brick columns supporting a massive pedimented dormer. A rear porch is conventional, with wooden Doric pillars above brick columns.
