= Arlington Station, California =

Arlington Station
- Neighborhood
- Location in California
- Coordinates: 33°54′51″N 117°26′28″W
- Country: United States
- State: California
- County: Riverside County
- City: Riverside
- Elevation: 817 ft (249 m)

Arlington Station (formerly, Arlington) is a former unincorporated community, now annexed to Riverside in Riverside County, California. It lies at an elevation of 817 feet (249 m). Arlington Station is located on the Atchison, Topeka and Santa Fe Railroad, 6 miles (9.7 km) southwest of downtown Riverside.
