= Arlington High School (Nebraska) =

Location
- 705 North 9th Street; Arlington, (Washington County), Nebraska 68002; United States; 41°27′27″N 96°21′36″W

Information
- Type: Co-Educational, public, secondary
- Motto: "Soaring to Excellence"
- Established: 1957
- School district: Arlington Public Schools
- Principal: Aaron Pfingsten
- Staff: 60 (2026)
- Teaching staff: 27.40 (on an FTE basis)
- Grades: 7th–12th
- Enrollment: 330 (2024–2025)
- Student to teacher ratio: 12.04
- Colors: Maroon and white
- Mascot: American Eagle
- Website: https://www.apseagles.org

Arlington High School is a public high school in Arlington, Nebraska, United States. AHS is located in a Pre-K-12 building in a distant rural setting. It is ranked 21st out of Nebraska high schools.

== Extracurricular Activities ==
=== Athletics ===
Fall	Winter	Spring
Cross Country	Boys Basketball	Baseball
Football	Girls Basketball	Boys Golf
Girls Golf	Swimming & Diving	Track and Field
Softball	Wrestling	
Volleyball	Cheer	
	Dance	

=== Clubs & Groups ===
- Arlo_Striv
- Art Club
- FBLA (Future Business Leaders of America)
- FFA (Future Farmers of America)
- National Honor Society
- Quiz Bowl
- SkillsUSA
- Student Council

=== Fine Arts ===
- Band
- Choir
- One-Act
- Speech
