= Harlingen =

Harlingen may mean:

- Harlingen, Netherlands, a municipality and city in the province of Friesland in the Netherlands
- Harlingen, Texas, a city in the United States
- Harlingen, New Jersey, an unincorporated village in Montgomery Township, New Jersey, United States
