= Arlington (band) =

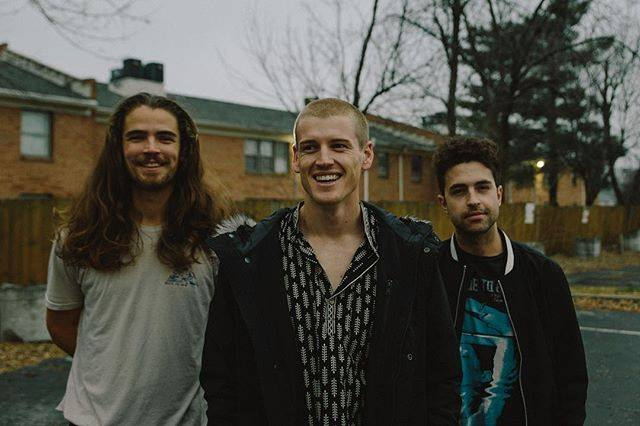
- Arlington; from left to right: Channing Peake, Tyler Benko, Grant Whitson.

Background information
- Origin: Southern California, United States
- Genres: Alternative rock
- Years active: 2016–present
- Labels: Rise Records
- Members: Tyler Benko; Grant Whitson; Channing Peake
- Website: arlingtonofficial.com

Arlington is an American alternative rock band formed in Southern California in 2016. The band consists of vocalist and guitarist Tyler Benko, bass guitarist and vocalist Channing Peake, and percussionist Grant Whitson. The band signed to Rise Records, released their debut full-length studio album, Walk Through Jackson County, on October 26, 2018.

== Formation ==
Lifelong friends Tyler and Channing were both a part of the former Southern California band False Puppet. Following the group's disbandment, they reached out to Grant who tour managed them on Warped Tour and happened to also know how to play the drums.

== Production ==
After just four shows, Rise Records obtained early demos, and promptly signed the band. They hit the studio with producer Matt Bayles to record A Walk Through Jackson County.

== Members ==
Current members

- Tyler Benko – lead vocals, lead guitar (2016–present)
- Channing Peake – bass, vocals (2016–present)
- Grant Whitson – drums (2016–present)

== Discography ==
=== Studio albums ===
- A Walk Through Jackson County (Rise Records, 2018)
