= Arlington, Montgomery County, Ohio =

Unincorporated community in Ohio, U.S.

Coordinates: 39°51′59″N 84°25′34″W

Arlington is an unincorporated community in Montgomery County, in the U.S. state of Ohio.

== History ==
Arlington was platted in 1838 on the National Road. Variant names were Corwin, South Arlington, and Vorhees. A post office called Corwin was established in 1849, and closed in 1856. The post office was reestablished as South Arlington in 1858, the name was changed to Vorhees in 1881, and the post office was discontinued in 1901.
