= Arlington, Nova Scotia =

Community in Nova Scotia, Canada

Coordinates: 45°11′56.31″N 64°25′28.87″W

Arlington in Nova Scotia

Arlington is a community in the Canadian province of Nova Scotia, located in Kings County.
