= Arlington, Nebraska =

Village in Washington County, Nebraska, United States

- Village
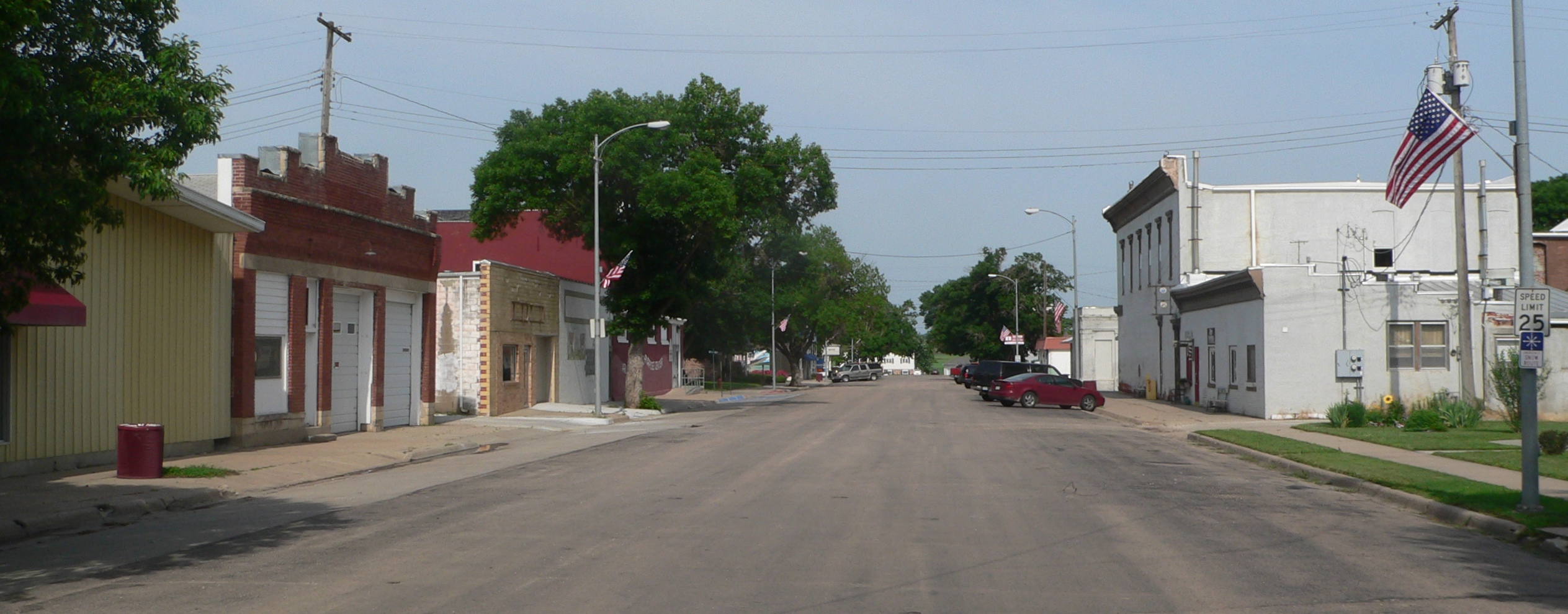
- Downtown Arlington: Eagle Street, June 2013

- Location of Arlington, Nebraska
- Coordinates: 41°27′17″N 96°21′24″W
- Country: United States
- State: Nebraska
- County: Washington

Area
  - Total: 0.60 sq mi (1.55 km^{2})
  - Land: 0.60 sq mi (1.55 km^{2})
  - Water: 0 sq mi (0.00 km^{2})
- Elevation: 1,211 ft (369 m)

Population (2020)
  - Total: 1,300
  - Density: 2,172.6/sq mi (838.85/km^{2})
- Time zone: UTC-6 (Central (CST))
  - Summer (DST): UTC-5 (CDT)
- ZIP code: 68002
- Area code: 402
- FIPS code: 31-01990
- GNIS feature ID: 2397985
- Website: www.arlingtonne.gov/c/

Arlington is a village along the Elkhorn River in Washington County, Nebraska, United States. The population was 1,300 at the 2020 census, making it the most populous village in Nebraska. Arlington is named after Arlington, Ohio.

== History ==
Arlington was originally called Bell Creek (after nearby Bell Creek) and under the latter name was platted in 1869 when the Sioux City and Pacific Railroad was extended to that point. Due to similarity in name with another place in Nebraska, Bell Creek was renamed Arlington, after the city of Arlington, Virginia, in 1882. Arlington was home to the Marshall Nurseries, an internationally acclaimed nursery credited with creating the Marshall seedless green ash tree (Fraxinus pennsylvanica 'Marshall'), one of the most common green ash cultivars planted in the United States.

== Geography ==
According to the United States Census Bureau, the village has a total area of 0.60 square miles (1.55 km^{2}), all land.

== Demographics ==
Historical population
Census	Pop.	Note	%±
1890	412		—
1900	579		40.5%
1910	645		11.4%
1920	695		7.8%
1930	622		−10.5%
1940	569		−8.5%
1950	593		4.2%
1960	740		24.8%
1970	910		23.0%
1980	1,117		22.7%
1990	1,178		5.5%
2000	1,197		1.6%
2010	1,243		3.8%
2020	1,300		4.6%
U.S. Decennial Census

=== 2010 census ===
As of the census of 2010, there were 1,243 people, 495 households, and 344 families living in the village. The population density was 2,071.7 inhabitants per square mile (799.9/km^{2}). There were 524 housing units at an average density of 873.3 per square mile (337.2/km^{2}). The racial makeup of the village was 97.9% White, 0.1% African American, 0.3% Native American, 0.5% Asian, 0.7% from other races, and 0.5% from two or more races. Hispanic or Latino of any race were 2.7% of the population.

There were 495 households, of which 38.6% had children under the age of 18 living with them, 57.2% were married couples living together, 8.5% had a female householder with no husband present, 3.8% had a male householder with no wife present, and 30.5% were non-families. 27.1% of all households were made up of individuals, and 14.7% had someone living alone who was 65 years of age or older. The average household size was 2.51 and the average family size was 3.06.

The median age in the village was 38.3 years. 28.2% of residents were under the age of 18; 5.9% were between the ages of 18 and 24; 25.7% were from 25 to 44; 25.1% were from 45 to 64; and 15.2% were 65 years of age or older. The gender makeup of the village was 48.7% male and 51.3% female.

=== 2000 census ===
As of the census of 2000, there were 1,197 people, 475 households, and 342 families living in the village. The population density was 2,104.3 inhabitants per square mile (812.5/km^{2}). There were 492 housing units at an average density of 864.9 per square mile (333.9/km^{2}). The racial makeup of the village was 98.75% White, 0.08% Native American, 0.17% Asian, 0.08% Pacific Islander, 0.17% from other races, and 0.75% from two or more races. Hispanic or Latino of any race were 1.09% of the population.

There were 475 households, out of which 36.2% had children under the age of 18 living with them, 59.8% were married couples living together, 7.2% had a female householder with no husband present, and 27.8% were non-families. 25.9% of all households were made up of individuals, and 14.3% had someone living alone who was 65 years of age or older. The average household size was 2.52 and the average family size was 3.01.

In the village, the population was spread out, with 27.7% under the age of 18, 6.9% from 18 to 24, 28.4% from 25 to 44, 23.1% from 45 to 64, and 14.0% who were 65 years of age or older. The median age was 38 years. For every 100 females, there were 92.8 males. For every 100 females age 18 and over, there were 89.5 males.

As of 2000 the median income for a household in the village was $45,365, and the median income for a family was $51,250. Males had a median income of $35,083 versus $24,615 for females. The per capita income for the village was $19,453. About 3.3% of families and 3.7% of the population were below the poverty line, including 5.5% of those under age 18 and 3.5% of those age 65 or over.

== See also ==
- List of municipalities in Nebraska
