= Arlington, California =

Arlington
- Neighborhood of Riverside
- Location in California's Riverside County
- Coordinates: 33°55′13″N 117°26′47″W
- Country: United States
- State: California
- County: Riverside County
- City: Riverside
- Elevation: 791 ft (241 m)

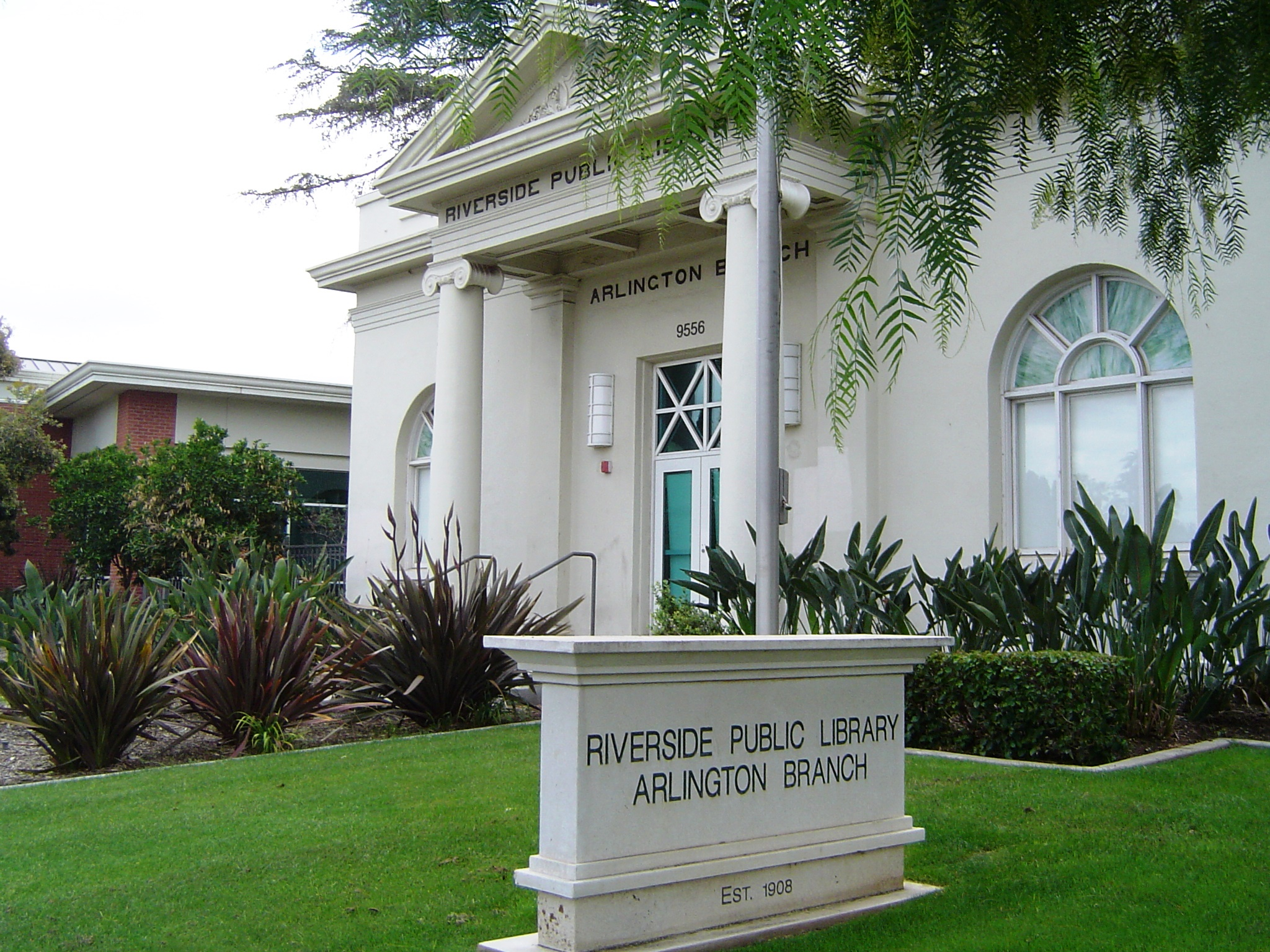
The 1909 Arlington Branch Library, one of the oldest buildings in the Arlington area.

Arlington is a historic neighborhood in Riverside, California, United States, about seven miles southwest of the city’s downtown. It is part of the Inland Empire, which is east of the Los Angeles and Orange County metropolitan areas.

With a population of about 12,300, the major commercial hub of Arlington is centered on Magnolia Avenue, a major east-west thoroughfare that connects the community with Downtown Riverside to the east and the Corona area to the west.

Arlington is common as a place name in the United States, with other significant communities bearing the same name in Virginia (near Washington D.C.) and Texas. The Southern California location was apparently so named in an 1877 meeting of early residents. At the time, the nation's union Civil War dead were being commemorated through frequent use of the place name, in honor of Arlington National Cemetery.

== History ==
Founded in 1875, parts of Arlington made up the City of Riverside at its founding in 1883, while other parts were annexed in 1961 and 1964.

Farming was a major mainstay of the economy, with an emphasis on citrus cultivation that has continued to the present day in the Arlington Heights and South Arlington neighborhoods, which lie to the south of the core business district.

By 1910, the present small downtown of Arlington had developed on Magnolia Avenue. The community was served by the Riverside–Arlington Line, which ran from Riverside to Corona, and eventually became a part of the greater Pacific Electric Railway. Among the structures still standing from this era are the 1910 Jenkins Building on the corner of Van Buren Boulevard and Magnolia Avenue, which has housed a variety of retail and commercial services, and the 1908–1909 Arlington Branch Library, a classical revival building that was renovated in 1996 and expanded in 2008. As recently as 2006, horse stables, while not in use, still stood next to the library building.

The first school in the area was a one-room schoolhouse on Miller Street, later replaced by an 1891 structure, which no longer stands, as this is now Arlington Park, a neighborhood city park.

In 1901, the federal Bureau of Indian Affairs began construction on the Sherman Institute (now the Sherman Indian High School) on the corner of Jackson Street and Magnolia Avenue. The boarding school for Native American youth began operations on the new site in 1904 and is still in service today, though it is now dedicated to preserving native cultural heritages.

A small museum, with exhibits on the school's history and Native American traditional societies, stands at 9010 Magnolia Ave.

To the east of the school (and somewhat outside of the present-day boundaries of Arlington) was Chemawa Park, which according to the Sercl, in the early 20th century contained a “small zoo, roller-skating rink, amusement park, polo field, fairgrounds and tea socials.” Since 1927, this site has been a public school.

The General Hospital of Riverside County stood in Arlington from 1893 to 1998, when it moved to a new location in Moreno Valley.

Parkview Community Hospital, located on Jackson Street just north of Magnolia Avenue, has served the area since its founding in 1958.

Major suburban development transformed the Arlington area after World War II, occurring in phases that continued through the 1980s.

== Geography ==
The Arlington area is a gently-sloping plain, with major hills to the northwest (the Challen Hills) and to the south of the citrus belt.

It is about 30 miles (48 km) east of the North Orange County cities of Anaheim and Fullerton, which are accessible from the 91 Freeway. Los Angeles and San Diego are both about two hours away by car, located to the west and south, respectively.

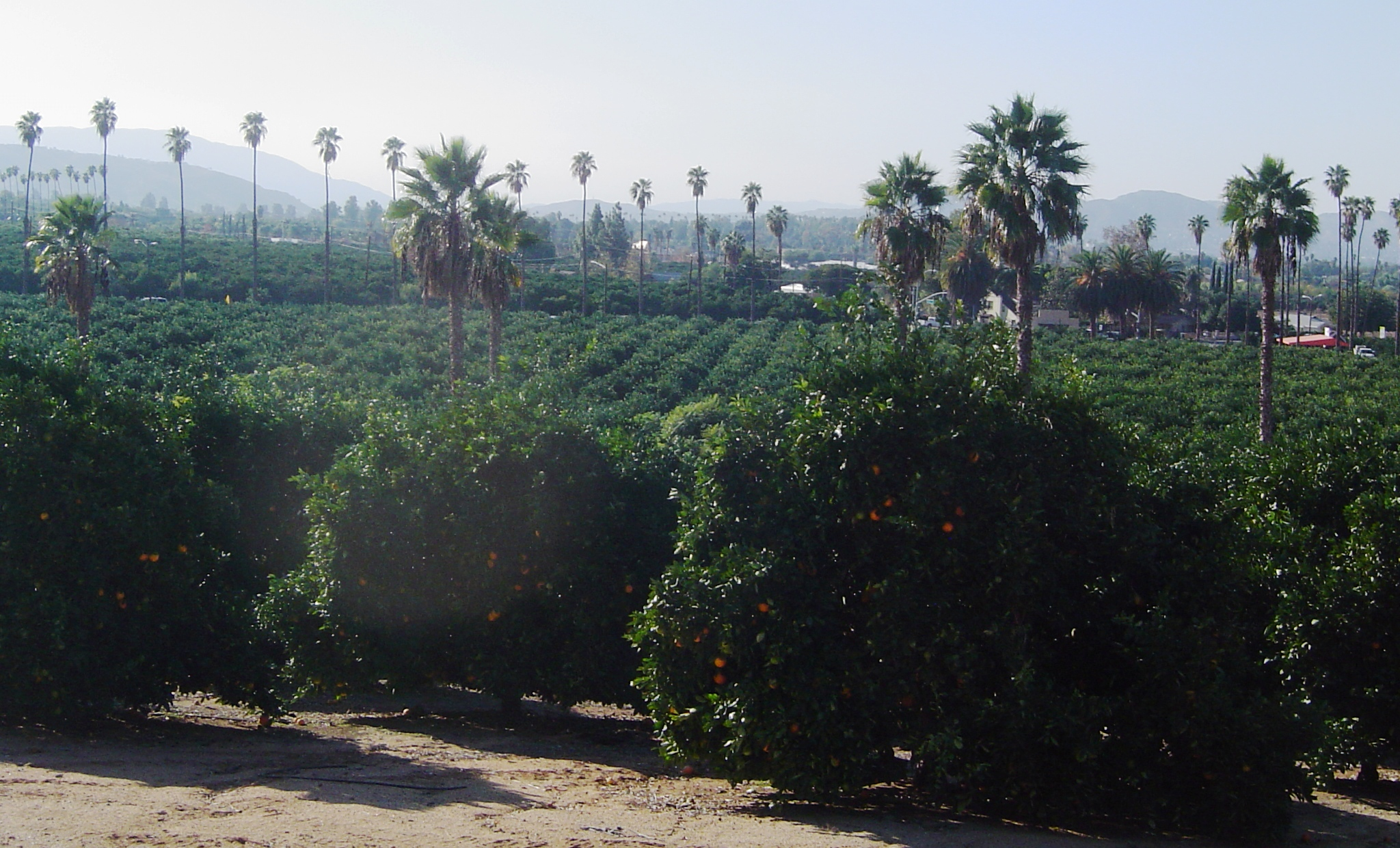
View of the orange groves from California Citrus State Historic Park in the Arlington Heights area.

Lying at an altitude of 791 feet, residents of Arlington have mountain views on a clear day, with the San Gabriel Mountains visible to the north and the San Bernardinos and San Jacintos rising to the east.

=== Climate ===
The Riverside Municipal Airport weather station is the closest official station to Arlington. However, the citrus farming areas are typically cooler at night, as they lie outside of the urban heat island, which is associated with warmer conditions.

In winter, many days are quite warm (as high as 80˚F), though nights can be quite cold. Frost and ice accumulations occur on several nights of most years, which have historically resulted in financial losses to citrus growers.

Summers are brutally hot, with high temperatures averaging around 96˚F, though daytime temperatures above 110˚F are experienced in many years during heat waves. Summer nights can be uncomfortably warm or pleasantly cool.

The area is at the western edge of the influx of monsoonal moisture that brings periodic high humidity, thunderstorms and rainfall during summer.

Most precipitation occurs during winter and is highly variable from year to year, as is typical in Southern California.

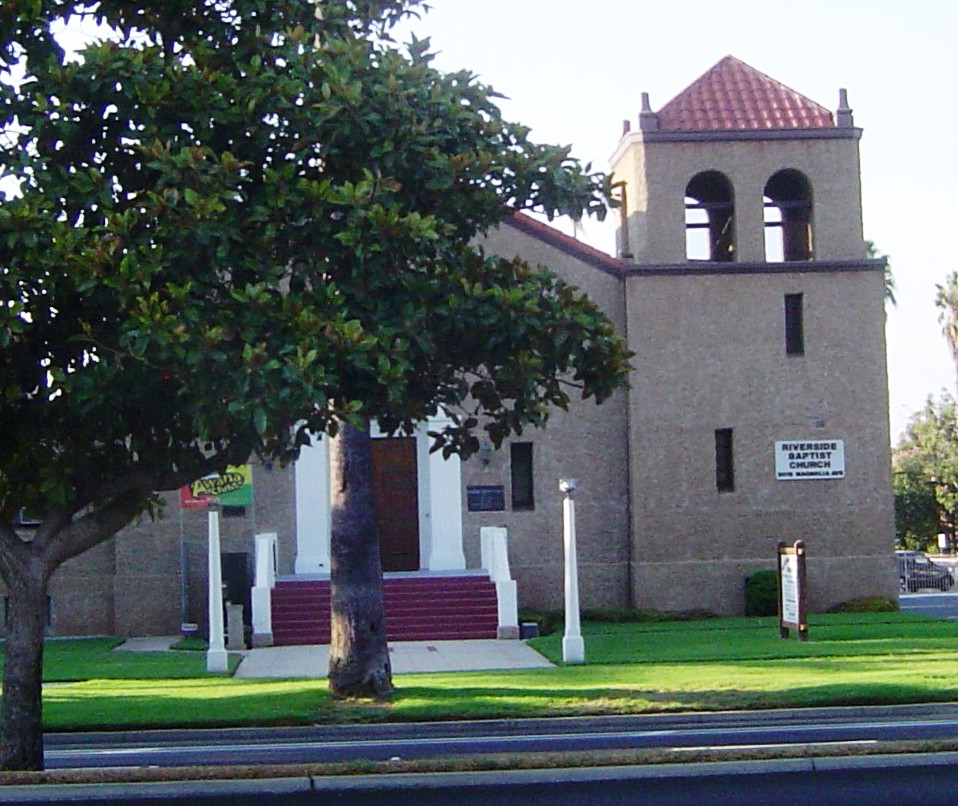
Once the chapel of Sherman Indian High School, the historic church at 9015 Magnolia Avenue in the Arlington area of Riverside now houses the Riverside Baptist Church. The bells, which ring for Sunday morning and Wednesday evening services, can be heard throughout the residential neighborhoods.

The Arlington Heights weather station, an amateur observation station, provides relatively accurate climate data for the Arlington area.

== Demographics ==
As part of the City of Riverside, demographic information is often combined with the broader 92503 zip code or the citywide data.

However, general trends include a large Hispanic population, which has grown in recent decades but has its roots in the community's early history as a citrus farming area, and a socioeconomic profile that ranges from lower middle class to middle class, depending on neighborhood and household.

As a whole, the more urban parts of Arlington (north of Indiana Avenue) have a higher Hispanic percentage, as well as a greater number of residents of other ethnic groups, including Asians and African-Americans, while the Arlington Heights area to the south is more heavily Caucasian.

Despite being in close proximity to California Baptist University, a four-year Christian higher education institution on the eastern fringes of the area, and UC Riverside and La Sierra University to the east and west, respectively, educational attainment in Arlington is generally low, with some subsets of the neighborhood containing hundreds of people lacking a single individual who has attained a master's degree or higher, according to City Data.

There are also notable homeless populations, which are concentrated in and around Magnolia Avenue.

== Economy ==
Arlington is a bedroom community with major commuting patterns include Van Buren Boulevard heading north to the Ontario area and Magnolia Avenue and the 91 Freeway eastbound towards Downtown Riverside, San Bernardino and other employment centers in the eastern Inland Empire.

A number of residents commute to Orange County or Los Angeles County, either for full-time jobs or as a part of more flexible employment arrangements.

Significant employers within the Arlington area include Parkview Community Hospital, Galleria at Tyler (a large indoor shopping mall), retail outlets of varying sizes, restaurants, basic professional and staple services, and public and private K-12 educational facilities.

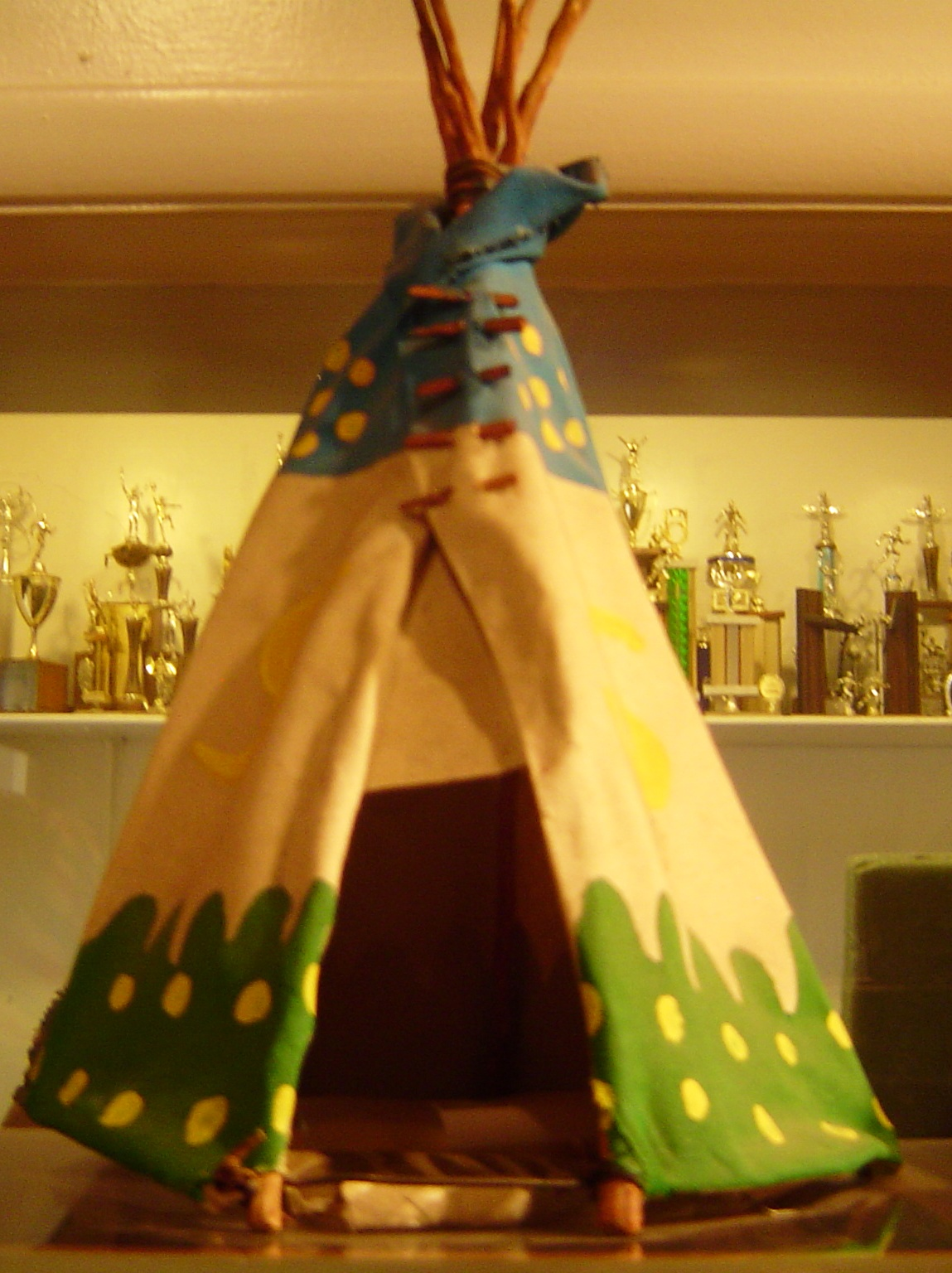
A tepee reconstruction at the Sherman Indian Museum, which highlights the traditional cultures of Native Americans.

== Arts and Culture ==
Since 2003, the Arlington Business Partnership has sponsored the Annual Chili Cook-Off & Car/Cycle Show, which is now held on Memorial Day weekend. Resulting in the closure of Magnolia Avenue for an entire day, this is the largest such annual event in the community.

== Educational Institutions ==
Arlington High School, part of the Riverside Unified School District, serves the area. There are also a number of private schools, such as St. Thomas the Apostle Roman Catholic School and Bethel Christian Center.

== Bibliography ==
Sercl, Georgia Gordon (2007). Arlington. Mount Pleasant, SC: Arcadia Publishing. ISBN 9780738555805
