= Arlington, Ohio =

- Village
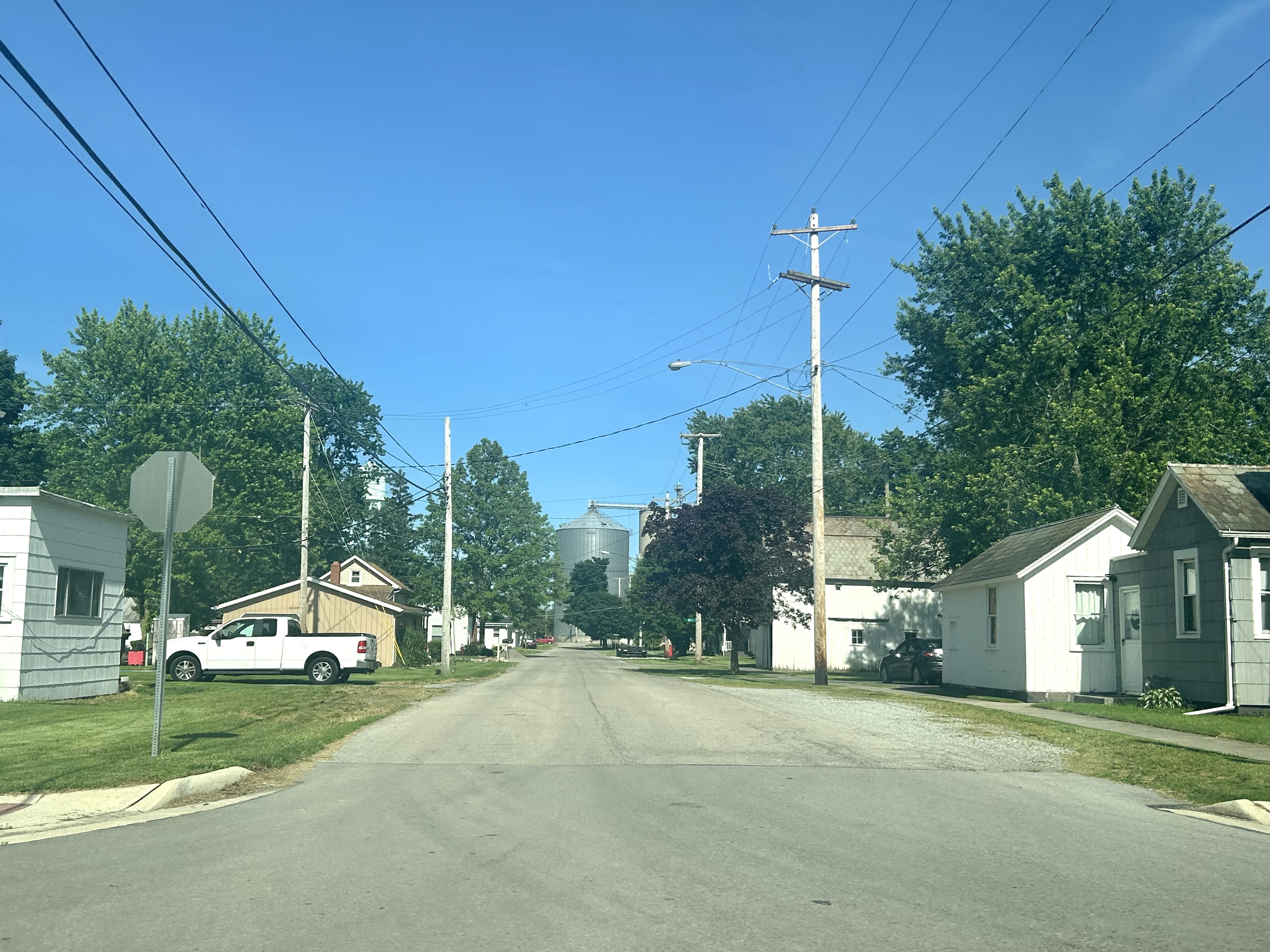
- A residential street in Arlington
- Nicknames: Flag Village, USA
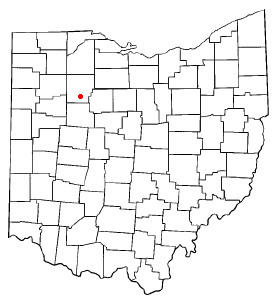
- Location of Arlington, Ohio

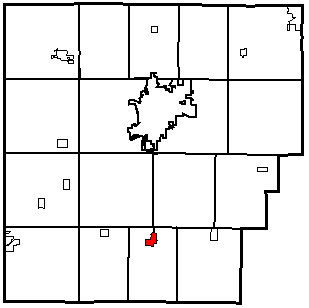
- Location within Hancock County

- Location within Ohio Location within the United States Location within North America
- Coordinates: 40°53′37″N 83°39′11″W
- Country: United States
- State: Ohio
- County: Hancock

Area
  - Total: 0.78 sq mi (2.03 km^{2})
  - Land: 0.78 sq mi (2.03 km^{2})
  - Water: 0 sq mi (0.00 km^{2})
- Elevation: 860 ft (260 m)

Population (2020)
  - Total: 1,492
  - Estimate (2023): 1,453
  - Density: 1,900.5/sq mi (733.79/km^{2})
- Time zone: UTC-5 (Eastern (EST))
  - Summer (DST): UTC-4 (EDT)
- ZIP code: 45814
- Area code: 419
- FIPS code: 39-02400
- GNIS feature ID: 2397983
- Website: https://villageofarlington.com/

Arlington is a village in Hancock County, Ohio, United States. The population was 1,492 at the 2020 census.

== History ==
The first log cabin built on what would become Arlington was built in 1834 by sons of Robert Hurd. The town was laid out in 1844 by Robert Hurd. The village was named after Arlington, Virginia. A post office has been in operation at Arlington since 1846.

== Geography ==
According to the United States Census Bureau, the village has a total area of 0.80 square miles (2.07 km^{2}), all land.

== Demographics ==
Historical population
Census	Pop.	Note	%±
1880	136		—
1900	738		—
1910	798		8.1%
1920	606		−24.1%
1930	701		15.7%
1940	752		7.3%
1950	825		9.7%
1960	955		15.8%
1970	1,066		11.6%
1980	1,187		11.4%
1990	1,267		6.7%
2000	1,351		6.6%
2010	1,455		7.7%
2020	1,492		2.5%
2023 (est.)	1,453	▼	−2.6%
U.S. Decennial Census

=== 2010 census ===
As of the census of 2010, there were 1,455 people, 556 households, and 381 families living in the village. The population density was 1,818.8 inhabitants per square mile (702.2/km^{2}). There were 602 housing units at an average density of 752.5 per square mile (290.5/km^{2}). The racial makeup of the village was 98.9% White, 0.3% African American, 0.1% Native American, 0.1% Asian, 0.1% from other races, and 0.5% from two or more races. Hispanic or Latino of any race were 0.8% of the population.

There were 556 households, of which 36.9% had children under the age of 18 living with them, 55.6% were married couples living together, 9.0% had a female householder with no husband present, 4.0% had a male householder with no wife present, and 31.5% were non-families. 28.6% of all households were made up of individuals, and 16% had someone living alone who was 65 years of age or older. The average household size was 2.53 and the average family size was 3.12.

The median age in the village was 38 years. 27.1% of residents were under the age of 18; 6.3% were between the ages of 18 and 24; 26.3% were from 25 to 44; 23.4% were from 45 to 64; and 17% were 65 years of age or older. The gender makeup of the village was 46.7% male and 53.3% female.

=== 2000 census ===
As of the census of 2000, there were 1,351 people, 520 households, and 361 families living in the village. The population density was 1,851.7 inhabitants per square mile (714.9/km^{2}). There were 539 housing units at an average density of 738.8 per square mile (285.3/km^{2}). The racial makeup of the village was 99.48% White, 0.15% African American, and 0.37% from two or more races. Hispanic or Latino of any race were 0.22% of the population.

There were 520 households, out of which 36.2% had children under the age of 18 living with them, 59.8% were married couples living together, 6.5% had a female householder with no husband present, and 30.4% were non-families. 27.7% of all households were made up of individuals, and 18.1% had someone living alone who was 65 years of age or older. The average household size was 2.49 and the average family size was 3.07.

In the village, the population was spread out, with 26.9% under the age of 18, 7.8% from 18 to 24, 28.3% from 25 to 44, 18.1% from 45 to 64, and 18.8% who were 65 years of age or older. The median age was 38 years. For every 100 females, there were 84.6 males. For every 100 females age 18 and over, there were 81.3 males.

The median income for a household in the village was $39,115, and the median income for a family was $51,324. Males had a median income of $36,118 versus $22,917 for females. The per capita income for the village was $18,333. About 3.9% of families and 5.4% of the population were below the poverty line, including 7.0% of those under age 18 and 3.8% of those age 65 or over.

== Education ==
Local high school pupils attend Arlington High School.

Arlington has a public library, a branch of the Findlay-Hancock County Public Library.
