= USS Marvin H. McIntyre =

1944 Haskell-class attack transport ship

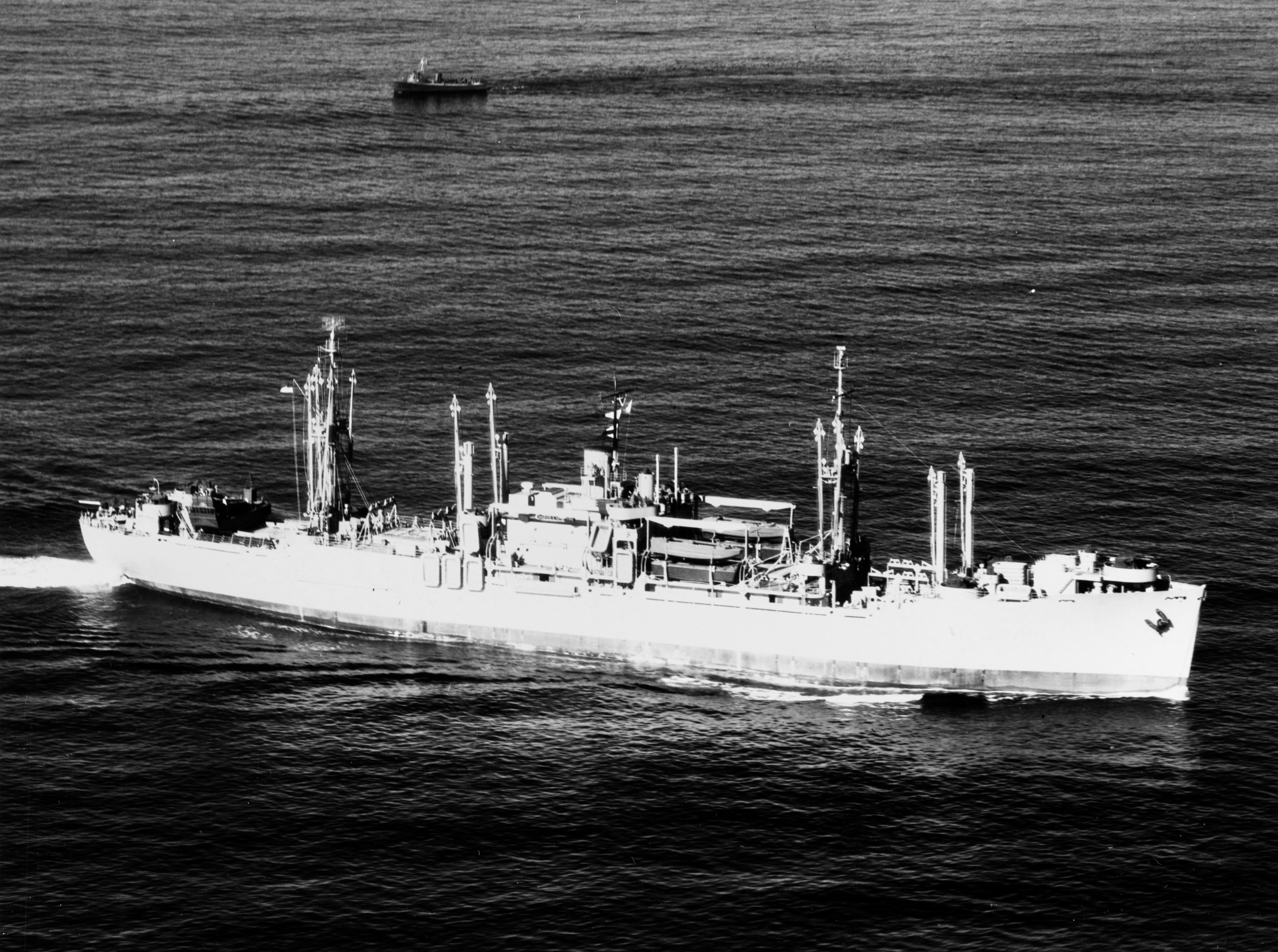

History

United States
- Name: USS Marvin H. McIntyre
- Builder: California Shipbuilding
- Laid down: 12 May 1944
- Launched: 21 September 1944
- Commissioned: 28 November 1944
- Decommissioned: 6 June 1946
- Stricken: 19 June 1946
- Honors and awards: 1 Battle star
- Fate: Sold for scrap, 9 April 1973

General characteristics
- Class & type: Haskell-class attack transport
- Displacement: 6,873 tons (lt), 14,837 t (fl)
- Length: 455 ft (139 m)
- Beam: 62 ft (19 m)
- Draft: 24 ft (7 m)
- Propulsion: 1 × geared turbine, 2 × header-type boilers, 1 × propeller, designed 8,500 shp (6,338 kW)
- Speed: 17 knots (31 km/h; 20 mph)
- Boats & landing craft carried: 2 × LCM; 12 × LCVP; 3 × LCPL
- Capacity: Troops: 86 officers, 1,475 enlisted; Cargo: 150,000 cu ft, 2,900 tons
- Complement: 56 officers, 480 enlisted
- Armament: 1 × 5"/38 dual-purpose gun; 4 × twin 40mm guns; 10 × single 20mm guns; late armament, add 1 × 40mm quad mount

USS Marvin H. McIntyre (APA-129) was a Haskell-class attack transport in service with the United States Navy from 1944 to 1946. She was scrapped in 1973.

== History ==
Marvin H. McIntyre was of the VC2-S-AP5 Victory ship design type. Originally designated Arlington for Arlington County, Virginia, she was renamed in memorial to Marvin H. McIntyre, Secretary to President Franklin Delano Roosevelt, who died in office in 1943, becoming the only Haskell-class ship not named for a U.S. County. She was built under United States Maritime Commission contract (M.C.V. hull No. 45), was launched by the California Shipbuilding Corp., Wilmington, Los Angeles, 21 September 1944; sponsored by Mrs. F. H. Warren, daughter of McIntyre; acquired by the Navy on loan charter 27 November 1944; and commissioned 28 November 1944.

After shakedown, Marvin H. McIntyre stood out of Los Angeles Harbor, 18 January 1945, on her first war mission. She arrived at her destination, Lunga Point, Guadalcanal, 4 February and commenced intensive amphibious training operations in preparation for the invasion of Okinawa. Departing the Solomons 15 March, McIntyre steamed in convoy for the advanced staging area at Ulithi. There she rendezvoused with her task unit and sailed for the Ryukyus 27 March. At Okinawa on 1 April, she discharged passengers and cargo for the initial attack. The attack transport remained off Okinawa until 5 April, when she retired to the Marianas with wounded marines as passengers. She arrived at Saipan on the 9th, debarked the casualties, and got underway against the next day for Pearl Harbor.

McIntyre reached Pearl Harbor 19 April, remaining for 2 weeks before continuing on to San Francisco. At San Francisco she embarked Army Air Corps men and equipment for passage to the Philippines and sailed on 18 May. She entered Manila Bay 14 June, debarked the troops, and then steamed for Leyte, discharging cargo at Tacloban on the 19th. The ship then headed for New Guinea. Arriving Milne Bay, 30 June, she embarked medical supplies and a hospital detachment and got underway for Manila. Next ordered to Ulithi, the transport took on veteran Army Air Corps troops for return to the United States. McIntyre entered the harbor at San Pedro, Los Angeles, 2 August.

The cessation of hostilities brought no immediate change in McIntyre's operations. Proceeding to Guam 21 August, she continued to transport troops and cargo to and among the islands of the western and central Pacific for the next 2 months. On 30 October, she reported, at Nagasaki, for "Magic Carpet" duty, returning men to the United States, arriving Seattle 21 November. The following month she returned to the western Pacific, arriving at Samar, Philippine Islands, 10 January 1946. She remained in Philippine waters until mid‑February. On 11 February, she departed Manila, called at Subic to embark passengers and then proceeded on to the west coast. Arriving San Francisco, 3 March, she debarked her passengers and prepared to get underway for Norfolk, Virginia.

McIntyre entered Hampton Roads 13 April, decommissioned there 6 June 1946, and returned to the Maritime Commission on the 12th. Her name was struck from the Navy list on the 19th.

=== Fate ===
Marvin H. McIntyre entered the National Defense Reserve Fleet at James River, Virginia, on 12 June 1946. In 1955 McIntyre was withdrawn from the Reserve Fleet as part of a Repair Program, GAA-So. Atl. SS Co., and then returned. On 9 April 1973 she was sold to Union Minerals and Alloys Corporation, for $111,560, to be scrapped. At 1235 EDT, on 24 July 1973 she was withdrawn from the Reserve Fleet and sent to the breaker's yard.

All that remains of McIntyre is her brass builder's plate.

== Awards ==
Marvin H. McIntyre received one battle star for World War II service.
