= Arlington Antebellum Home & Gardens =

Historic house in Alabama, United States

- Arlington
- U.S. National Register of Historic Places
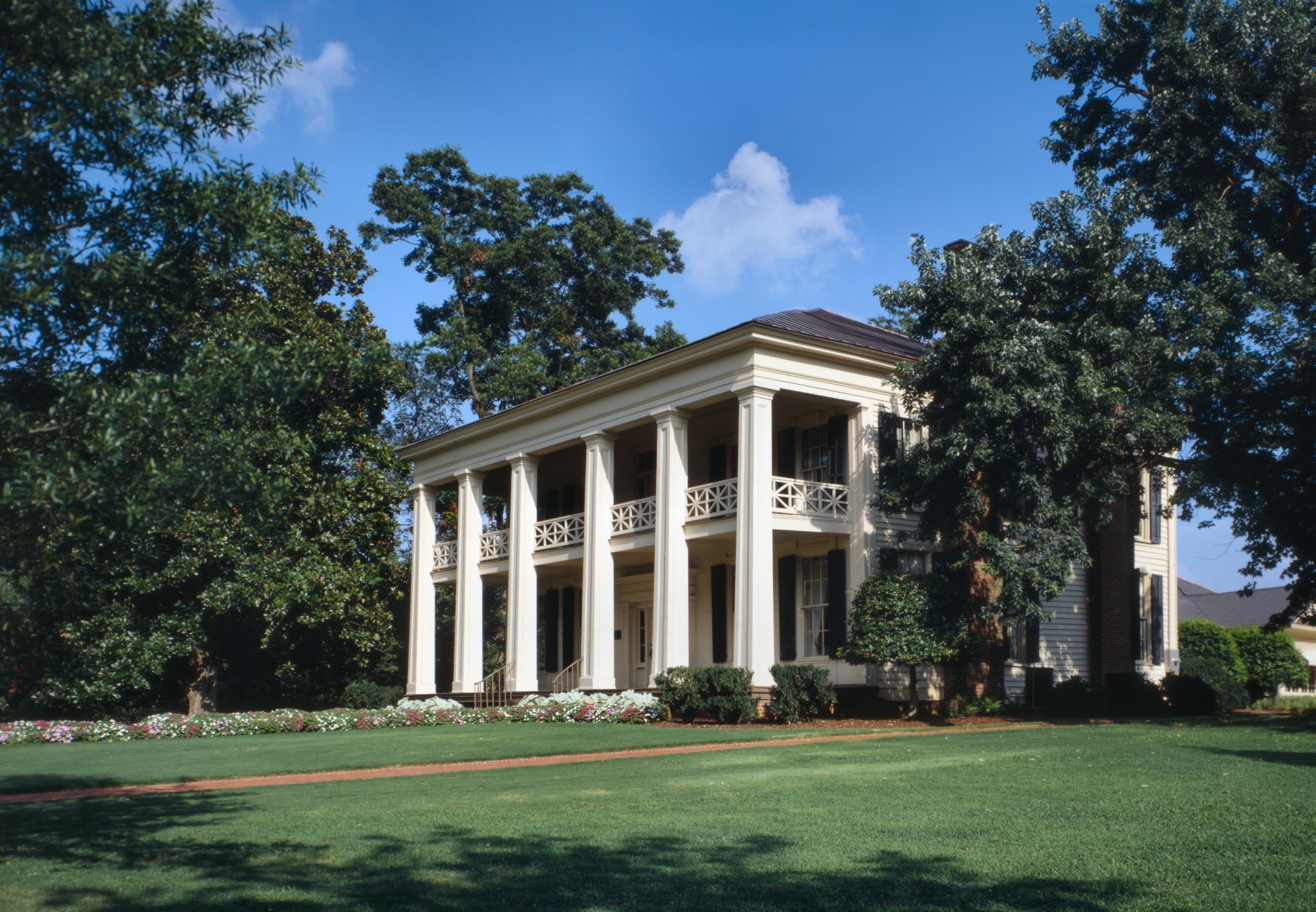
- Arlington in 1993

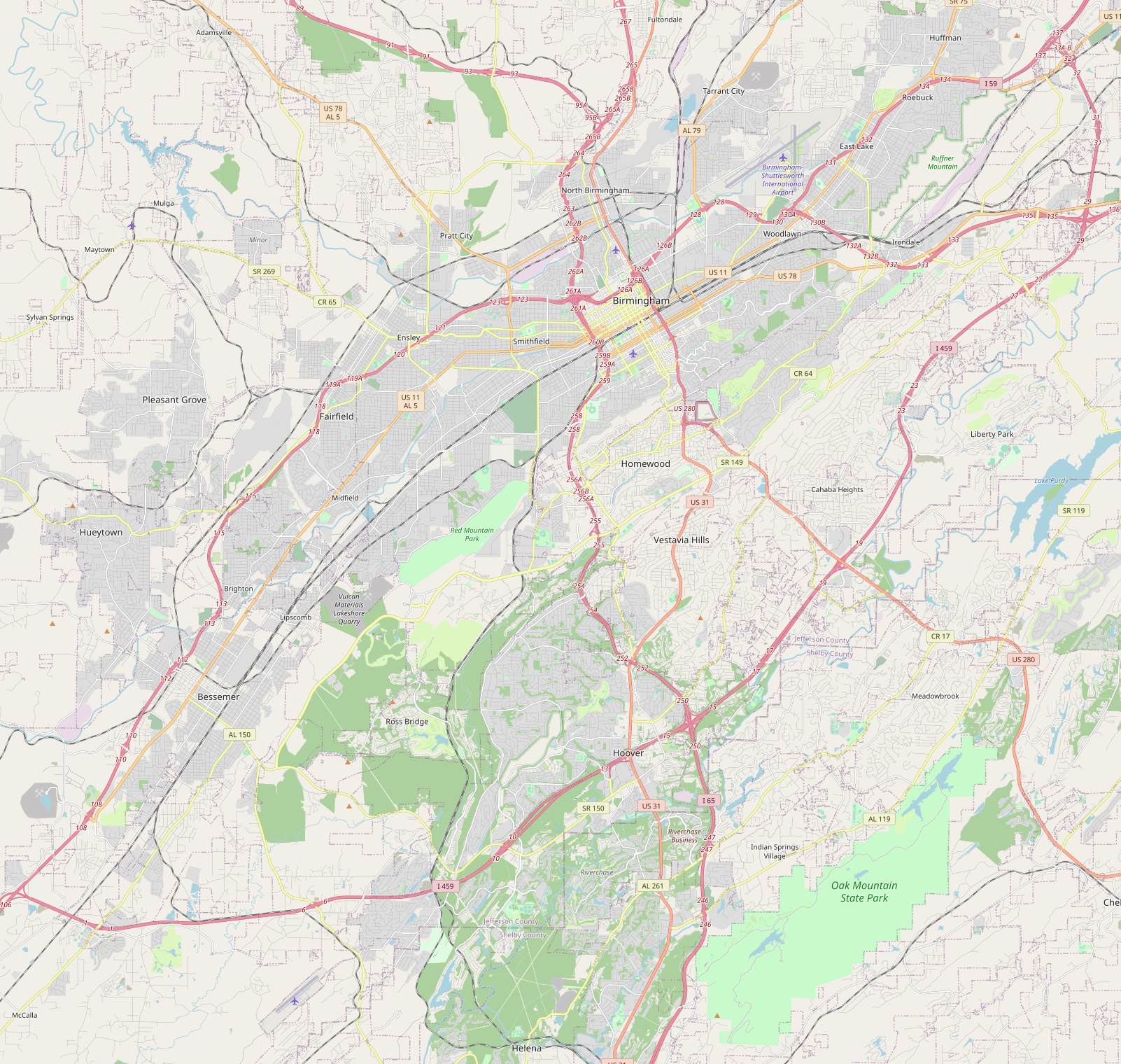
- Location within Birmingham, Alabama Location within Alabama Location within the United States
- Location: 331 Cotton Ave., SW, Birmingham, Alabama
- Coordinates: 33°29′59″N 86°50′20″W
- Built: 1845–50
- Architect: Stephen Hall; William Mudd
- Architectural style: Greek Revival, Federal
- NRHP reference No.: 70000103
- Added to NRHP: December 2, 1970

Arlington Antebellum Home & Gardens, or Arlington Historic House, is a former plantation and 6 acres (24,000 m^{2}) of landscaped gardens near downtown Birmingham, Alabama, United States. The two-story frame structure was built by enslaved people between 1845–50. Its style is antebellum-era Greek Revival architecture. The house serves as a decorative arts museum, featuring a collection of 19th-century furniture, textiles, silver, and paintings. The garden features a restored garden room that is used for special events. The house was added to the National Register of Historic Places on December 2, 1970, as Arlington, and has also been known as the Mudd-Munger House.

== History ==
The classic Greek revival style architecture of this two-story home was the construction of a settler from Georgia by the name of Stephen Hall in 1822. Hall came to Birmingham to assist in the building process of a new courthouse and jail. He acquired the original seventeen acres of land and began construction of the future Arlington Home and Gardens.[ii] In 1840 Hall's son, Samuel inherited the property, but died two years later, leaving his loved ones with a large debt to pay off.[iii] Because of this debt the family was forced to auction off the property for a mere 600 dollars to a man by the name of William S. Mudd.[iv] Mudd served over twenty years as a Circuit Court Judge in Elyton until he resigned in 1883.[v] He purchased an adjacent eighty acres and named the site “The Grove”.

This property was never a "plantation" in that crops were not produced here. This property was only used as a private residence.

In 1846 Mudd married Florence Earle and began building a larger home in place of Hall's, which he called The Grove for the numerous old hardwood trees surrounding the house site. Under Mudd's orders, enslaved laborers and craftsmen built a grand eight-room mansion in the Greek Revival style. Built between 1845 and 1850 by William S. Mudd in Elyton, the second county seat of Jefferson County, Birmingham, a city that Mudd helped to establish, eventually grew to encompass the former site of Elyton. Arlington is one of the only surviving structures from the time of Elyton and is Birmingham's only antebellum mansion. Arlington was used by Union troops during Wilson's Raid in 1865, and was the starting point for the burning of the University of Alabama, which had trained cadets for the Confederacy and was operating a hospital for soldiers.

The property went through several owners and in 1902 became the home of Robert S. Munger. Over the next twenty years he made many renovations including adding plumbing and electric lights. He had another structure moved across the street behind the main house which was used for a kitchen, dining room, sun parlor and sleeping quarters. Mr. Munger also had one of the first “motor cars” in Birmingham.

In 1953, a citizen's group and the City of Birmingham raised money to purchase Arlington.

The ashes of former Birmingham mayor George G. Siebels, Jr. are interred at Arlington.

== See also ==
- Arlington Park, an adjacent historic district on former area of Arlington
