= NCAA Division I women's volleyball tournament =

Annual American volleyball tournament

- Current season, competition or edition: 2026 NCAA Division I women's volleyball tournament
- Association: NCAA
- Sport: College indoor volleyball
- Founded: 1981; 45 years ago
- Division: Division I
- No. of teams: 64
- Country: United States
- Most recent champion: Texas A&M (1st title)
- Most titles: Stanford (9)
- Broadcaster: ABC
- Website: NCAA.com

The NCAA Division I women's volleyball tournament is an annual event organized by the National Collegiate Athletic Association to determine the national champion of women's collegiate volleyball among its Division I members in the United States. It has been contested every winter since 1981, except 2020.

Texas A&M won the most recent tournament, defeating Kentucky 3–0 at the T-Mobile Center in Kansas City, Missouri.

Stanford has been the most successful program, with nine national titles.

== History ==
From 1970 through 1980, before the NCAA governed women's collegiate athletics, the Association for Intercollegiate Athletics for Women conducted the women's collegiate volleyball championships.

Volleyball was one of twelve women's sports that were added to the NCAA championship program for the 1981–82 school year, as the NCAA engaged in battle with the AIAW for sole governance of women's collegiate sports. The AIAW continued to conduct its established championship program in the same twelve (and other) sports. After only a year of dual women's championships, the NCAA wrested control from and supplanted the AIAW, absorbing most of its membership.

The first NCAA championship tournament was held in 1981, with 20 schools competing for the title. The tournament expanded gradually, moving to 28 teams in 1982, 32 in 1986, 48 in 1993, 56 in 1997, and finally to its current size of 64 in 1998.

There is also an NCAA Men's National Collegiate Volleyball Championship, which until 2012 was open to members of all three NCAA divisions, as there are far fewer men's programs than women's. However, starting in the 2011–12 school year (2011 women's season, 2012 men's season), a Division III championship was established. The National Collegiate championship now involves only Division I and II members; under NCAA rules, D-II schools can compete under D-I rules in any sport that does not have a dedicated D-II national championship.

== Champions ==
- The following is a list of Division I champions and runners-up with the champion's overall record, city, site and other national semifinal participants.

See Association for Intercollegiate Athletics for Women championships for the Division I volleyball champions from 1970 to 1981. NOTE: In 1981 there were both NCAA and AIAW champions.

NCAA Division I Women's Volleyball Championship
Year	Host city (University)	Host Arena	Final			Third Place Final / Semifinalists		
Year	Host city (University)	Host Arena	Winner	Score	Runner-up	Third Place	Score	Fourth Place
1981	Los Angeles (UCLA)	Pauley Pavilion	USC (27–10)	3–2	UCLA	San Diego State	3–0	Pacific
1982	Stockton, California (Pacific)	Alex G. Spanos Center	Hawaiʻi (33–1)	3–2	USC	San Diego State	3–2	Stanford
1983	Lexington, Kentucky (Kentucky)	Memorial Coliseum	Hawaiʻi (2) (34–2)	3–0	UCLA	Stanford	3–1	Pacific
1984	Los Angeles (UCLA)	Pauley Pavilion	UCLA (33–6)	3–2	Stanford	Pacific	3–1	San Jose State
1985	Kalamazoo, Michigan (Western Michigan)	Read Fieldhouse	Pacific (36–3)	3–1	Stanford	USC	3–2	UCLA
1986	Stockton, California (Pacific)	Alex G. Spanos Center	Pacific (2) (39–3)	3–0	Nebraska	Texas, Stanford		
1987	Indianapolis	Market Square Arena	Hawaiʻi (3) (37–2)	3–1	Stanford	Illinois, Texas		
1988	Minneapolis (Minnesota)	Williams Arena	Texas (34–5)	3–0	Hawaiʻi	Illinois, UCLA		
1989	Honolulu, Hawaii (Hawaiʻi)	Blaisdell Arena	Long Beach State (32–5)	3–0	Nebraska	UT Arlington, UCLA		
1990	College Park, Maryland (Maryland)	Cole Field House	UCLA (2) (36–1)	3–0	Pacific	LSU, Nebraska		
1991	Los Angeles (UCLA)	Pauley Pavilion	UCLA (3) (31–5)	3–2	Long Beach State	LSU, Ohio State		
1992	Albuquerque, New Mexico (New Mexico)	University Arena	Stanford (31–2)	3–1	UCLA	Long Beach State, Florida		
1993	Madison, Wisconsin (Wisconsin)	UW Field House	Long Beach State (2) (32–2)	3–1	Penn State	BYU, Florida		
1994	Austin, Texas (Texas)	Frank Erwin Center	Stanford (2) (32–1)	3–1	UCLA	Penn State, Ohio State		
1995	Amherst, Massachusetts (Massachusetts)	Mullins Center	Nebraska (32–1)	3–1	Texas	Stanford, Michigan State		
1996	Cleveland, Ohio (Cleveland State)	CSU Convocation Center	Stanford (3) (31–2)	3–0	Hawaiʻi	Nebraska, Florida		
1997	Spokane, Washington (Washington State)	Spokane Arena	Stanford (4) (33–2)	3–2	Penn State	Long Beach State, Florida		
1998	Madison, Wisconsin (Wisconsin)	Kohl Center	Long Beach State (3) (36–0)	3–2	Penn State	Nebraska, Florida		
1999	Honolulu, Hawaii (Hawaiʻi)	Stan Sheriff Center	Penn State (36–1)	3–0	Stanford	Long Beach State, Pacific		
2000	Richmond, Virginia (VCU)	Richmond Coliseum	Nebraska (2) (34–0)	3–2	Wisconsin	Hawaiʻi, USC		
2001	San Diego (San Diego State)	Cox Arena	Stanford (5) (33–2)	3–0	Long Beach State	Arizona, Nebraska		
2002	New Orleans (New Orleans)	New Orleans Arena	USC (2) (31–1)	3–1	Stanford	Hawaiʻi, Florida		
2003	Dallas	Reunion Arena	USC (3) (35–0)	3–1	Florida	Hawaiʻi, Minnesota		
2004	Long Beach, California (Long Beach State)	Long Beach Arena	Stanford (6) (30–6)	3–0	Minnesota	USC, Washington		
2005	San Antonio (UTSA)	Alamodome	Washington (32–1)	3–0	Nebraska	Santa Clara, Tennessee		
2006	Omaha, Nebraska (Nebraska)	Qwest Center	Nebraska (3) (33–1)	3–1	Stanford	UCLA, Washington		
2007	Sacramento, California (Sacramento State)	ARCO Arena	Penn State (2) (34–2)	3–2	Stanford	California, USC		
2008	Omaha, Nebraska (Nebraska)	Qwest Center	Penn State (3) (38–0)	3–0	Stanford	Nebraska, Texas		
2009	Tampa, Florida (South Florida)	St. Pete Times Forum	Penn State (4) (38–0)	3–2	Texas	Hawaiʻi, Minnesota		
2010	Kansas City, Missouri (UMKC)	Sprint Center	Penn State (5) (32–5)	3–0	California	Texas, USC		
2011	San Antonio (UTSA)	Alamodome	UCLA (4) (30–6)	3–1	Illinois	Florida State, USC		
2012	Louisville, Kentucky (Louisville)	KFC Yum! Center	Texas (2) (29–4)	3–0	Oregon	Michigan, Penn State		
2013	Seattle, Washington (Washington)	KeyArena	Penn State (6) (34–2)	3–1	Wisconsin	Texas, Washington		
2014	Oklahoma City (Oklahoma)	Chesapeake Energy Arena	Penn State (7) (36–3)	3–0	BYU	Stanford, Texas		
2015	Omaha, Nebraska (Nebraska)	CenturyLink Center Omaha	Nebraska (4) (32–4)	3–0	Texas	Kansas, Minnesota		
2016	Columbus, Ohio (Ohio State)	Nationwide Arena	Stanford (7) (27–7)	3–1	Texas	Minnesota, Nebraska		
2017	Kansas City, Missouri (UMKC & Kansas)	Sprint Center	Nebraska (5) (33–4)	3–1	Florida	Penn State, Stanford		
2018	Minneapolis, Minnesota (Minnesota)	Target Center	Stanford (8) (34–1)	3–2	Nebraska	BYU, Illinois		
2019	Pittsburgh, Pennsylvania (Duquesne)	PPG Paints Arena	Stanford (9) (30–4)	3–0	Wisconsin	Baylor, Minnesota		
2020 (Note: Due to COVID-19, the NCAA moved its 2020–21 championship events in fall sports from fall 2020 to spring 2021. The NCAA is labeling the tournament as the "2020" edition, but the season as "2020–21".)	Omaha, Nebraska (Nebraska)	CHI Health Center Omaha	Kentucky (24–1)	3–1	Texas	Washington, Wisconsin		
2021	Columbus, Ohio (Ohio State)	Nationwide Arena	Wisconsin (31–3)	3–2	Nebraska	Louisville, Pittsburgh		
2022	Omaha, Nebraska (Nebraska)	CHI Health Center Omaha	Texas (3) (28–1)	3–0	Louisville	Pittsburgh, San Diego		
2023	Tampa, Florida (South Florida)	Amalie Arena	Texas (4) (28–4)	3–0	Nebraska	Pittsburgh, Wisconsin		
2024	Louisville, Kentucky (Louisville)	KFC Yum! Center	Penn State (8) (35–2)	3–1	Louisville	Pittsburgh, Nebraska		
2025	Kansas City, Missouri (Kansas)	T-Mobile Center	Texas A&M (29–4)	3–0	Kentucky	Pittsburgh, Wisconsin		
2026	San Antonio, Texas (UTSA)	Alamodome						
2027	Columbus, Ohio (Ohio State)	Nationwide Arena						

== Statistics ==
=== Team titles ===
Schools with national championships
— 9 championships, – 8 championships, – 5 championships, – 4 championships, – 3 championships
– 2 championships, – 1 championship

Team	Number	Year won
Stanford	9	1992, 1994, 1996, 1997, 2001, 2004, 2016, 2018, 2019
Penn State	8	1999, 2007, 2008, 2009, 2010, 2013, 2014, 2024
Nebraska	5	1995, 2000, 2006, 2015, 2017
Texas	4	1988, 2012, 2022, 2023
UCLA	4	1984, 1990, 1991, 2011
Hawaii	3	1982, 1983, 1987
Long Beach State	3	1989, 1993, 1998
USC	3	1981, 2002, 2003
Pacific	2	1985, 1986
Kentucky	1	2020
Texas A&M	1	2025
Washington	1	2005
Wisconsin	1	2021

=== Results by team and year ===
- CH National Champion
- RU National Runner-up
- SF Semifinals
- QF Quarterfinals
- 16 Round of 16
- 20 28 32 Second Round (20 teams 1981, 28 teams 1982 through 1985, 32 teams 1986 to present)
- ✖ First Round (48 teams 1993 through 1996, 56 teams 1997, 64 teams 1998 through present, except 2020)
- P From 1994 through 1997, some teams would have to play in a play-in game to qualify for the NCAA Tournament. The losers of these games are not considered by the NCAA to have participated in the NCAA Tournament. They are marked on this table, though these seasons do not accumulate toward their total appearances.
- ~~16~~ ~~32~~ ~~✖~~ The team achieved the placement shown, but the participation was later vacated. These vacated appearances are not included in the total columns.

Starting in 1993, the NCAA seeded the top 4 seeds in each region. This was expanded to the top 8 seeds in each region in 2022. For these seasons, teams' seeds are shown in superscript to the left of the result.

School	Conference (as of 2026)	#	16	QF	SF	CG	CH	81	82	83	84	85	86	87	88	89	90	91	92	93	94	95	96	97	98	99	00	01	02	03	04	05	06	07	08	09	10	11	12	13	14	15	16	17	18	19	20	21	22	23	24	25
Stanford	ACC	44	39	32	23	17	9	QF	SF	SF	RU	RU	SF	RU	16	16	QF	QF	CH	⁴16	¹CH	¹SF	¹CH	¹CH	²16	¹RU	32	¹CH	¹RU	²16	³CH	²32	¹RU	¹RU	¹RU	¹16	¹QF	³32	¹QF	²QF	¹SF	²32	²CH	¹SF	¹CH	¹CH		32	¹QF	¹QF	²QF	²16
Penn State	Big Ten	45	36	21	14	11	8	16	28	16	16	28	16	32	32	32	QF	16	16	³RU	²SF	⁴16	²QF	¹RU	¹RU	¹CH	³QF	32	³32	³QF	¹16	¹16	¹QF	¹CH	¹CH	¹CH	¹CH	²16	¹SF	¹CH	²CH	²16	⁴16	¹SF	²QF	³QF	⁴16	32	⁴16	⁵16	¹CH	⁸32
Nebraska	Big Ten	44	41	34	18	11	5		16	28	QF	QF	RU	QF	16	RU	SF	QF	16	32	¹QF	¹CH	¹SF	²QF	¹SF	³16	¹CH	¹SF	¹QF	³16	¹QF	¹RU	¹CH	¹QF	¹SF	³QF	¹16	¹32	¹QF	²QF	⁴QF	¹CH	¹SF	²CH	²RU	²QF	²QF	³RU	²16	¹RU	¹SF	¹QF
Texas	SEC	42	37	29	15	9	4		16	16	QF	QF	SF	SF	CH	QF	QF	16	QF	¹QF	32	²RU	⁴16	³16	³QF	⁴32		32	32		²16	32	²QF	¹QF	¹SF	¹RU	³SF	¹QF	¹CH	¹SF	¹SF	¹RU	¹RU	²QF	²QF	¹16	¹RU	¹QF	¹CH	²CH	³16	¹QF
UCLA	Big Ten	39	29	22	12	8	4	RU	QF	RU	CH	SF	32	16	SF	SF	CH	CH	RU	¹QF	¹RU	²QF		32	32	³QF	⁴QF	²QF	32	²QF	⁴QF	⁴16	¹SF	²QF	⁴16	²32	32	³CH	²32		³16	⁴16	³QF	⁴16		32	32	⁴16				⁸32
Hawaii	Mountain West	42	28	19	9	5	3	QF	CH	CH	28	16	QF	CH	RU	QF	16	QF		²QF	³16	¹QF	¹RU	✖	²QF	¹16	²SF	³16	²SF	¹SF	¹16	²16	³QF	³32	²QF	³SF	⁴32	³16	32	³32	32	QF	32	✖	✖	³16		32	⁸✖	32	✖	
Long Beach State	Big West	27	13	10	8	5	3					28		32	16	CH	QF	RU	SF	¹CH	²QF	32	²16	¹SF	¹CH	²SF	16	¹RU	✖	✖	32	✖	32	32	32	✖	✖	✖			32											
USC	Big Ten	41	24	17	10	4	3	CH	RU	28	QF	SF		32	32	32		16	16	32	²QF	16	16	³16	⁴16	⁴32	¹SF	¹QF	¹CH	¹CH	²SF	³32	²16	²SF	32	32	²SF	²SF	²QF	²QF	32	¹QF	✖	³QF	³32	32			⁶32	⁸32	⁶32	⁴32
Pacific	West Coast	24	19	11	7	3	2	SF	QF	SF	SF	CH	CH	QF	QF	16	RU	16	QF	³16	⁴16	⁴32	²16	32	³16	¹SF	¹16	³16	32	32	✖																					
Wisconsin	Big Ten	29	23	16	7	4	1										16	16		32	✖		16	¹QF	²QF	32	²RU	²16	⁴32	32	⁴QF	³QF	³16	²32						³RU	¹QF	²16	¹QF	16	²QF	¹RU	¹SF	¹CH	¹QF	¹SF	²QF	³SF
Kentucky	SEC	27	16	6	2	2	1			QF				QF	16		16		16	⁴32												✖	32	✖	✖	16	✖	16	⁴16	⁴32	⁴32	✖	32	¹QF	³16	³16	¹CH	²32	³16	²16	³QF	¹RU
Washington	Big Ten	28	17	12	5	1	1						32		QF	32					32		32	⁴16					32	³QF	²SF	¹CH	²SF	²32	²QF	²32	QF	32	⁴16	¹SF	¹16	²QF	²QF	²32	16	²QF	²SF	⁴16	⁸✖		✖	
Texas A&M	SEC	28	11	3	1	1	1	16	28			16	32							32	32	⁴16	32	³16	32	⁴QF	32	³QF	32	⁴16	32	✖				16		⁴32	32	32	✖	³32	✖			⁴16				✖	⁶16	³CH
Florida	SEC	36	31	17	8	2	-							16				QF	SF	²SF	³16	¹QF	¹SF	²SF	¹SF	²QF	⁴16	³QF	²SF	¹RU	32	²QF	³16	⁴16	⁴16	⁴16	¹16	QF	⁴16	²32	²QF	³QF	³32	¹RU	16	³16	²QF	⁴16	³16	⁴32	⁶16	32
Louisville	ACC	34	11	5	3	2	-		28								32	32	32	✖	✖	32	16		⁴16	✖	✖	32	32	32	16	³16	✖	✖	✖	✖	32	32	³32	✖		⁴32		✖	32	QF	³16	¹SF	¹RU	²QF	¹RU	²16
Minnesota	Big Ten	30	22	9	6	1	-									16				16			32	32		16	¹16	32	²16	⁴SF	¹RU	32	²QF	✖	²32	³SF	³16	⁴16	²QF	³16		¹SF	¹SF	²16	¹16	²SF	¹16	³QF	²16	32	⁶32	⁴16
Illinois	Big Ten	28	19	7	4	1	-					16	QF	SF	SF	QF	32	32	QF	32	✖	³16			⁴16	32		32		⁴16	✖				³16	²16	²16	¹RU		⁴16	³16	16		16	¹SF	✖		16			✖	
BYU	Big 12	38	24	11	3	1	-	16	16	16	28	QF	QF	QF	16		32	32	QF	²SF	³32	32	³QF	²QF	²QF	³16	³16	✖		32		✖	32	QF					³16	16	RU	⁴16	⁴16	⁴16	¹SF	⁴32	⁴16	³16	⁷32	⁴32	⁵✖	⁵✖
California	ACC	17	9	4	2	1	-		16	16				32	32	16													32	³16	32	32	16	³SF	²QF	³QF	²RU	✖	✖	32												
Oregon	Big Ten	21	10	4	1	1	-				16		32	32		32																	✖	16	³16	⁴32		✖	²RU	32	³16	✖	32	32	⁴QF		³16	✖	³QF	²QF	⁴16	
Pittsburgh	ACC	21	7	6	5	-	-		28		28		32	32			16	32	32	✖	32									32	✖												32	32	³32	²32	QF	¹SF	²SF	¹SF	¹SF	¹SF
Ohio State	Big Ten	25	19	4	2	-	-									16	32	SF	32	⁴16	¹SF	³16	⁴16	16	32	~~32~~	~~⁴16~~	⁴16	⁴16		²QF	⁴32	³16			32	16	16	32		16	³16	16				³16	³16	³QF			
San Diego State	Pac-12	14	8	3	2	-	-	SF	SF	QF	16	28	16		16	32	16				32	⁴16	32					✖											✖													
LSU	SEC	16	5	3	2	-	-						QF	32		16	SF	SF	16													✖	✖	32	✖	⁴32	⁴✖			32	32			✖					32			
Arizona	Big 12	30	13	4	1	-	-	16	16	16	28	16	32	32	32	16				16	16		32	✖	32	16	²QF	²SF	³QF	✖	32	¹QF				✖	✖	✖		32	³32	✖	16		✖							32
Michigan State	Big Ten	20	7	3	1	-	-														✖	²SF	³QF	32	⁴✖	32	32	32	16	✖			✖	16		✖		32	16	16	32	32	³32	QF								
Michigan	Big Ten	21	7	2	1	-	-																	32		32	32		✖	32	32		✖	16	16	⁴QF	✖	16	SF	✖		32	³16	✖	16	32		✖				32
Florida State	ACC	26	5	2	1	-	-			28		28		32	32	32	32		32	32				✖	✖				✖							¹QF	32	³SF	³32	16	²16	32	16	✖	✖	✖		32	⁷✖	⁶✖	⁷✖	
UT Arlington	UAC	9	4	2	1	-	-					28	16	16	QF	SF	32											✖	✖																						✖	
Tennessee	SEC	20	6	1	1	-	-	20	16	16	16									32							✖				³16	⁴SF	✖		✖	32	³32	⁴32	✖						32			32	✖	³16	✖	⁷✖
San Diego	West Coast	27	5	1	1	-	-													✖			✖	32	32	32		32	✖	✖	³16	32	⁴16	✖	✖		32	32	✖	³16	✖	32	✖	32	16	32	32	✖	²SF			⁸✖
Baylor	Big 12	14	5	1	1	-	-																			32		✖								16		✖					32	³32	32	¹SF	³16	²16	⁴16	32	⁴32	⁶32
San Jose State	Mountain West	12	5	1	1	-	-		16	28	SF	16	16	16	32	32	32								✖		✖	32																								
Kansas	Big 12	14	4	1	1	-	-																							32	32	✖							³32	⁴16	⁴✖	³SF	²32	✖				16	32	⁴32	³32	⁴16
Santa Clara	West Coast	16	1	1	1	-	-												32	✖					✖	32	³32	✖	✖	✖	✖	SF	✖	✖	32				✖		✖	✖										
Purdue	Big Ten	27	18	6	-	-	-	16	QF	16	28	16		16			32														32	⁴16	⁴16	32	³16		⁴QF	²16	16	QF		32	32	32	32	⁴16	²QF	²QF	⁸32	³16	⁴16	³QF
UC Santa Barbara	Big West	30	10	4	-	-	-	QF	28	16	28	28	32	32	32	32	16	16	16	¹32	32	32	32	²QF	³16	²QF	⁴QF	✖	²16	✖	⁴32	✖	✖			✖				✖						32				✖		
Cal Poly	Big West	18	9	4	-	-	-	QF	QF	QF	16	QF	32	16	32	16										✖	32		✖				⁴32	⁴16										32	✖	32						16
Creighton	Big East	15	5	3	-	-	-																														32		32	32	✖	⁴16	QF	³32	³32	32	✖	⁴32	⁴✖	³16	²QF	³QF
Pepperdine	West Coast	27	7	2	-	-	-	20	28		28		32	32	32	32	32	32						✖	16	²16	³32	²16	³QF	¹16		16	✖	✖	✖			⁴QF	✖						32		32	✖	✖	✖		
Washington State	Pac-12	18	5	2	-	-	-											32		32	✖	³32	²QF	³16			32	✖	⁴QF							✖							32	32	⁴16	✖	⁴32	32	⁷32	⁴16		
Iowa State	Big 12	18	5	2	-	-	-															32											32	16	QF	¹16	✖	¹QF	⁴16	✖	32	32	✖	⁴32		✖		✖	⁶32	⁷✖		⁵32
Georgia Tech	ACC	15	4	2	-	-	-														32	32	32				✖	✖	32	²QF	16					✖											32	²QF	⁵32	⁵16	⁷32	✖
Notre Dame	ACC	21	6	1	-	-	-								16				32	⁴QF	³16	²16	32	16	32	✖	32	✖	⁴32	✖	32	²16	✖			✖			✖					✖		✖	32					
Missouri	SEC	19	5	1	-	-	-																				✖	✖	32	✖	⁴32	³QF	32	✖			16	✖		¹32		32	⁴16	16	32	32	32			⁸32	⁷16	
Western Michigan	MAC	14	5	1	-	-	-		28	QF	16	28	16	16	32	32											✖								16			✖			✖									32	✖	
Duke	ACC	20	4	1	-	-	-				16	28	32					32	32	16	⁴16						✖	32	✖			32	32	32	32	✖	³QF	✖		⁴32	✖				✖							
North Carolina	ACC	21	3	1	-	-	-		28	28					32	32									32	32	✖	32	³16			✖			32		32	32	32	✖	²QF	32	²16					✖			⁸32	32
Oklahoma	SEC	13	3	1	-	-	-							32	QF									32									⁴16	32		✖	16	✖	32	32	✖					✖					⁸32	
Houston	Big 12	13	2	1	-	-	-									32		32	32	32	²QF	✖	✖	✖	✖	✖	✖																						⁵16	⁸32		
Arkansas	SEC	13	2	1	-	-	-																32	⁴32	³16	32		✖		32	✖	32	✖						✖	✖									⁶32	³QF		
Oral Roberts	Summit	9	1	1	-	-	-															QF	✖	32	✖	✖	✖	✖	✖				✖																			
Fresno State	Pac-12	5	1	1	-	-	-				QF							32							✖				✖																					✖		
Wyoming	Mountain West	4	1	1	-	-	-						32			QF	32				✖																															
Colorado State	Pac-12	32	10	-	-	-	-			28	16	16	32	16	16							✖	32	32	32	³16	²16	⁴16	✖	⁴16	✖	32	✖	⁴32	32	16	32	32	✖	✖	⁴16	✖	✖	32	✖	✖					✖	
Arizona State	Big 12	22	8	-	-	-	-	16	16	28		28	16	32	32				16	³32	⁴16	³16				✖	32		32				32						✖	✖	32	✖								⁵16	³32	²16
Colorado	Big 12	22	4	-	-	-	-									32		32	32	²16	⁴16	✖	32	⁴16	32	✖	32	32		✖	✖	✖	32							32	32			16	✖				✖			⁵32
Utah	Big 12	20	4	-	-	-	-																		32	32	32	⁴16	✖	32	✖	32	32		³16					32	32		✖	³16	32	16	⁴32	32			⁴32	✖
Northern Iowa	Missouri Valley	27	3	-	-	-	-						32	32				32			32	32			✖	16	32	⁴16	¹16	32			32	✖	✖	32	²✖	²32	32			✖	✖	32	✖	✖			32	⁸✖	⁸32	⁶32
Kansas State	Big 12	19	3	-	-	-	-																32	✖	32	32	16	32	32	²16	32	32		³32	✖			16	✖		✖	✖	⁴32					✖				32
Loyola Marymount	West Coast	16	3	-	-	-	-						16								✖	✖	³16	32		32	✖			32	✖	✖							✖		✖	16			32				✖		⁷32	
Marquette	Big East	14	3	-	-	-	-																															32	✖	32	✖	32	✖	✖	⁴16	32		✖	⁴16	⁶32	⁵16	32
Georgia	SEC	12	3	-	-	-	-					16	16					32	32	³16	32	32									✖									✖						✖			32	✖		
New Mexico	Mountain West	9	3	-	-	-	-	16							32		16	16	32	32	32															✖	✖															
Texas Tech	Big 12	9	2	-	-	-	-										16	16	32			32	✖		✖		✖	✖																				✖				
Indiana	Big Ten	6	2	-	-	-	-															✖			32	32			✖								16															⁴16
American	Patriot	19	1	-	-	-	-																	✖	✖			✖	✖	✖	✖	✖	✖	✖	✖		✖	✖		16	✖	32	✖	✖		✖						✖
Western Kentucky	CUSA	18	1	-	-	-	-																						✖			✖		✖	✖		✖	✖	32		✖	32	✖	32		⁴32	16	32	⁶32	⁶32	✖	⁷✖
Dayton	Atlantic 10	18	1	-	-	-	-																							32	✖	✖		⁴32	✖	32	⁴32	✖	32		32	32	✖		✖	✖	32	32		⁵32	⁵16	
Illinois State	Missouri Valley	17	1	-	-	-	-		28	28	28	28			32	32			16	✖			32	✖	✖									✖							32				✖	✖	✖	✖				
Miami (FL)	ACC	14	1	-	-	-	-																						16							✖	✖	32	✖	✖	32	✖		32				32	⁷✖	32	⁸32	⁵32
Cincinnati	Big 12	13	1	-	-	-	-	20																		✖	✖	32	✖	✖					32	✖	32	32					✖		32	16						
Wichita State	American	12	1	-	-	-	-																								32			32	32	32	✖	✖	16	✖		32	✖	⁴32							✖	
Ohio	MAC	10	1	-	-	-	-																							✖	32	16	✖	✖	✖	32	32			✖		✖										
Northwestern	Big Ten	8	1	-	-	-	-	16	28	28	28																		✖	✖		32					32															
Middle Tennessee	CUSA	7	1	-	-	-	-															✖											32	16	32	✖	✖	✖														
Saint Mary's	West Coast	7	1	-	-	-	-																							✖	³16	✖			✖	32			32						✖							
SMU	ACC	5	1	-	-	-	-																																			✖	32							⁷32	²32	²16
Oregon State	Pac-12	4	1	-	-	-	-			28																		✖													16			✖								
Temple	American	4	1	-	-	-	-																	✖	✖	✖			16																							
St. John's	Big East	3	1	-	-	-	-																										32	³16												✖						
Fairfield	Metro	15	-	-	-	-	-																	✖	✖	✖	✖	✖											✖	✖		✖	✖	✖		✖		✖		✖	✖	✖
Texas State	Pac-12	14	-	-	-	-	-						32					32							✖						✖	✖		✖		✖		✖		✖					32	✖	32			✖	✖	
Florida A&M	SWAC	14	-	-	-	-	-															P	P			✖		✖	✖	32	✖	✖	✖	✖	✖	✖												✖	✖		✖	✖
LIU	NEC	14	-	-	-	-	-																								✖	32	✖	✖	✖	✖			✖	✖	✖		✖	✖			✖			✖		✖
UCF	Big 12	13	-	-	-	-	-														✖	✖	✖	32				✖	✖	32											✖				⁴✖	32	✖	32	⁵32			
Missouri State	CUSA	12	-	-	-	-	-		28								32			✖										✖		✖	32	✖	✖		✖	✖				✖	✖	~~✖~~								
South Carolina	SEC	11	-	-	-	-	-				28											32		32	✖		32	✖	32																32	32		✖			✖	
Ball State	MAC	11	-	-	-	-	-												32	✖	32	32				✖	✖		✖									✖								✖		32	✖			
Sacramento State	Big West	11	-	-	-	-	-																	✖	32	✖	✖		✖	✖	✖	✖	✖	32																	✖	
Miami (OH)	MAC	10	-	-	-	-	-	20									32					✖	✖	✖	32									✖	✖								✖	✖								
Milwaukee	Horizon	10	-	-	-	-	-																		✖	✖	✖	✖	✖				✖		✖	✖		✖		✖												
Alabama A&M	SWAC	10	-	-	-	-	-																				✖	✖	✖	✖	✖	✖		✖	✖	✖	✖															
Charleston	CAA	10	-	-	-	-	-																						✖		✖	32	✖	✖		✖			32	✖				✖							✖	
New Mexico State	CUSA	10	-	-	-	-	-																							✖	✖		✖	✖	32				✖	✖		✖			✖	✖						
Yale	Ivy League	10	-	-	-	-	-																								32				32			✖	✖	✖	✖				✖				✖	✖	✖	
Princeton	Ivy League	9	-	-	-	-	-														✖	P		✖		✖	✖							✖									✖	✖		✖						✖
Stephen F. Austin	Southland	9	-	-	-	-	-														✖			✖		✖							32												✖	✖			✖	✖		✖
Hofstra	CAA	9	-	-	-	-	-															✖	✖	✖		✖	✖						32						✖		✖				✖							
Rice	American	9	-	-	-	-	-																								✖				✖	✖									✖	32	✖	32	⁵32			⁷✖
High Point	Big South	9	-	-	-	-	-																														✖						✖	✖	✖		32		✖	✖	✖	✖
Clemson	ACC	8	-	-	-	-	-													✖	32			✖	32	⁴✖								32	32	✖																
South Florida	American	8	-	-	-	-	-													✖		✖	⁴32	32	✖		✖		32																							✖
Loyola Chicago	Atlantic 10	8	-	-	-	-	-															✖				✖	✖				✖	✖																	✖		32	✖
Coastal Carolina	Sun Belt	8	-	-	-	-	-																✖		✖											✖					✖	✖	32	✖						✖		
New Hampshire	America East	8	-	-	-	-	-																		✖				✖	✖										✖	✖	✖	✖								✖	
Lipscomb	ASUN	8	-	-	-	-	-																											✖		✖	✖	✖			✖	✖	✖				✖					
Northern Colorado	Big Sky	8	-	-	-	-	-																													✖		✖	✖		✖					✖		✖	✖			✖
Maryland	Big Ten	7	-	-	-	-	-										32					32	⁴32	⁴32						32	32	32																				
Northern Illinois	Horizon	7	-	-	-	-	-													32			✖	32	32			✖										✖					✖									
George Mason	Atlantic 10	7	-	-	-	-	-													✖	✖	32	³32						✖	✖						✖																
Colgate	Patriot	7	-	-	-	-	-															P	✖			✖													✖									✖	✖	✖	✖	
Liberty	CUSA	7	-	-	-	-	-																	✖		✖		✖						✖	✖			✖	✖													
Utah State	Pac-12	7	-	-	-	-	-																				32	32				✖					✖												✖	⁶✖		32
Albany	America East	7	-	-	-	-	-																								✖		✖	32	✖		✖	✖								✖						
TCU	Big 12	7	-	-	-	-	-																													32						✖	32						32	32	⁵32	⁶32
Samford	Southern	7	-	-	-	-	-																															✖			✖		✖		✖	✖	✖		✖			
Arkansas State	Sun Belt	6	-	-	-	-	-												32		✖	✖				✖																✖										✖
Idaho	Big Sky	6	-	-	-	-	-												32	32	32	✖								✖	✖																					
Siena	Metro	6	-	-	-	-	-														P	✖	P									✖	✖	✖	✖						✖											
Southeast Missouri State	Ohio Valley	6	-	-	-	-	-														P		✖		✖	✖	32																			✖		✖				
UMBC	America East	6	-	-	-	-	-															P			✖																						✖	✖	✖	✖		✖
James Madison	Sun Belt	6	-	-	-	-	-																			✖	✖																✖	✖					✖	⁷✖		
Robert Morris	Horizon	6	-	-	-	-	-																			✖	✖	✖	✖	✖												✖										
Winthrop	Big South	6	-	-	-	-	-																						✖	✖	✖	✖	✖													✖						
Cleveland State	Horizon	6	-	-	-	-	-																											✖					✖			✖	✖	✖							✖	
Alabama State	SWAC	6	-	-	-	-	-																																	✖	✖		✖	✖	✖	✖						
Denver	West Coast	6	-	-	-	-	-																																		✖	✖	✖	✖	✖	✖						
Howard	MEAC	6	-	-	-	-	-																																			✖	✖	✖	✖	✖		✖				
Cal State Northridge	Big West	5	-	-	-	-	-												32				✖							✖	✖									32												
Towson	CAA	5	-	-	-	-	-														P										✖															32	✖	✖	⁸✖			
Little Rock	UAC	5	-	-	-	-	-																✖	✖	✖		✖														32											
Nevada	Mountain West	5	-	-	-	-	-																		✖			✖	✖		✖	✖																				
Penn	Ivy League	5	-	-	-	-	-																					✖	✖	✖						32	✖															
Alabama	SEC	5	-	-	-	-	-																									✖	✖	✖						✖	32											
Ole Miss	SEC	5	-	-	-	-	-																										✖	✖			✖											✖			32	
Delaware	CUSA	5	-	-	-	-	-																											32	✖		✖	32												✖		
Tulsa	American	5	-	-	-	-	-																											✖			32	32	✖													✖
Jackson State	SWAC	5	-	-	-	-	-																															✖	✖			✖					✖			✖		
Texas A&M–Corpus Christi	Southland	5	-	-	-	-	-																																			✖	✖				✖	✖			✖	
Florida Gulf Coast	ASUN	5	-	-	-	-	-																																						32			32	✖	✖	✖	
South Dakota	Summit	5	-	-	-	-	-																																						✖		✖	✖	✖		✖	
Wright State	Horizon	5	-	-	-	-	-																																							✖	32		✖	✖		✖
Lamar	Southland	4	-	-	-	-	-			28	28									✖															✖																	
Idaho State	Big Sky	4	-	-	-	-	-						32	32			32																							✖												
NC State	ACC	4	-	-	-	-	-							32																									✖					32							✖	
Eastern Washington	Big Sky	4	-	-	-	-	-									32									✖	✖		32																								
Bowling Green	MAC	4	-	-	-	-	-											32																					32								✖		✖			
George Washington	Atlantic 10	4	-	-	-	-	-													32	32	32					✖																									
Radford	Big South	4	-	-	-	-	-													✖							✖													✖				✖								
Georgia Southern	Sun Belt	4	-	-	-	-	-																					✖		✖							✖			✖												
Murray State	Missouri Valley	4	-	-	-	-	-																							✖											✖		✖		✖							
Belmont	Missouri Valley	4	-	-	-	-	-																										✖		✖				✖			✖										
UNLV	Mountain West	4	-	-	-	-	-																											✖									32				32		✖			
Sacred Heart	Metro	4	-	-	-	-	-																														✖	✖								✖		✖				
Morehead State	Ohio Valley	4	-	-	-	-	-																															✖		✖							32				✖	
Central Arkansas	UAC	4	-	-	-	-	-																																✖	✖				✖								✖
Rhode Island	Atlantic 10	3	-	-	-	-	-					28						32					✖																													
UC Irvine	Big West	3	-	-	-	-	-								32															32	✖																					
Weber State	Big Sky	3	-	-	-	-	-								32																																32			✖		
Montana	Big Sky	3	-	-	-	-	-										32	32			32																															
Cornell	Ivy League	3	-	-	-	-	-													✖												✖	✖																			
Valparaiso	Missouri Valley	3	-	-	-	-	-														P	P	P							✖	✖	✖																				
Brown	Ivy League	3	-	-	-	-	-																✖		✖																							✖				
Morgan State	MEAC	3	-	-	-	-	-																	✖	✖		✖																									
Florida Atlantic	American	3	-	-	-	-	-																		✖	✖						✖																				
Northern Arizona	Big Sky	3	-	-	-	-	-																			✖																✖			✖							
UTSA	American	3	-	-	-	-	-																				✖										✖			✖												
FIU	CUSA	3	-	-	-	-	-																					32							✖	32																
Eastern Illinois	Ohio Valley	3	-	-	-	-	-																					✖																						✖		✖
Xavier	Big East	3	-	-	-	-	-																					✖						✖																		⁸✖
Jacksonville	ASUN	3	-	-	-	-	-																								✖									✖	✖											
Binghamton	America East	3	-	-	-	-	-																									✖				✖			✖													
Jacksonville State	CUSA	3	-	-	-	-	-																									✖	✖			32																
VCU	Atlantic 10	3	-	-	-	-	-																									✖												✖		✖						
Saint Louis	Atlantic 10	3	-	-	-	-	-																										✖		⁴32	✖																
South Dakota State	Summit	3	-	-	-	-	-																											✖																	✖	⁷✖
North Dakota State	Summit	3	-	-	-	-	-																												✖		✖	✖														
Niagara	Metro	3	-	-	-	-	-																													✖	✖	✖														
Auburn	SEC	3	-	-	-	-	-																														32												32	⁷✖		
East Tennessee State	Southern	3	-	-	-	-	-																																✖					✖	✖							
Utah Valley	Big West	3	-	-	-	-	-																																								✖	✖				✖
Wofford	Southern	3	-	-	-	-	-																																											✖	✖	✖
Providence	Big East	2	-	-	-	-	-			28		28																																								
Eastern Kentucky	UAC	2	-	-	-	-	-				28																				✖																					
Iowa	Big Ten	2	-	-	-	-	-									32					✖																															
Appalachian State	Sun Belt	2	-	-	-	-	-													✖	✖																															
DePaul	Big East	2	-	-	-	-	-													✖								✖																								
Sam Houston	CUSA	2	-	-	-	-	-													✖			✖																													
Rider	Metro	2	-	-	-	-	-														✖	P	P																								✖					
Army	Patriot	2	-	-	-	-	-														P															✖											✖					
Marshall	Sun Belt	2	-	-	-	-	-															✖										✖																				
Chattanooga	Southern	2	-	-	-	-	-																P	✖	✖																											
Butler	Big East	2	-	-	-	-	-																	✖													✖															
Tennessee Tech	Southern	2	-	-	-	-	-																	✖											✖																	
Villanova	Big East	2	-	-	-	-	-																	✖																		✖										
Bucknell	Patriot	2	-	-	-	-	-																		✖		✖																									
Georgetown	Big East	2	-	-	-	-	-																		✖	✖																										
Virginia	ACC	2	-	-	-	-	-																		✖	✖																										
Davidson	Atlantic 10	2	-	-	-	-	-																			✖	✖																									
Prairie View A&M	SWAC	2	-	-	-	-	-																			✖							✖																			
Manhattan	Metro	2	-	-	-	-	-																						✖	✖																						
Green Bay	Horizon	2	-	-	-	-	-																							✖															✖							
San Francisco	West Coast	2	-	-	-	-	-																							✖					✖																	
Iona	Metro	2	-	-	-	-	-																								✖														✖							
UAB	American	2	-	-	-	-	-																										✖		32																	
Tennessee State	Ohio Valley	2	-	-	-	-	-																											✖															✖			
Tulane	American	2	-	-	-	-	-																												⁴32	✖																
Furman	Southern	2	-	-	-	-	-																												✖							✖										
Portland State	Big Sky	2	-	-	-	-	-																												✖		✖															
Purdue Fort Wayne	Horizon	2	-	-	-	-	-																													✖			✖													
Austin Peay	UAC	2	-	-	-	-	-																														✖							✖								
Maryland Eastern Shore	MEAC	2	-	-	-	-	-																															✖	✖													
Hampton	CAA	2	-	-	-	-	-																																	✖	✖											
Cal State Bakersfield	Big West	2	-	-	-	-	-																																		✖			✖								
Boise State	Pac-12	2	-	-	-	-	-																																				32					✖				
North Dakota	Summit	2	-	-	-	-	-																																				✖	✖								
Kennesaw State	CUSA	2	-	-	-	-	-																																					✖		✖						
Stony Brook	CAA	2	-	-	-	-	-																																					✖	✖							
Campbell	CAA	2	-	-	-	-	-																																									✖				✖
South Alabama	Sun Belt	2	-	-	-	-	-																																									✖		✖		
Delaware State	MEAC	2	-	-	-	-	-																																										✖		✖	
Southeastern Louisiana	Southland	2	-	-	-	-	-																																										✖	✖		
Coppin State	MEAC	2	-	-	-	-	-																																											✖		✖
UTEP	Mountain West	2	-	-	-	-	-																																												✖	⁶✖
Rutgers	Big Ten	1	-	-	-	-	-		28																																											
US International	defunct	1	-	-	-	-	-						32																																							
Gonzaga	Pac-12	1	-	-	-	-	-										32																																			
Memphis	American	1	-	-	-	-	-														✖																															
North Texas	American	1	-	-	-	-	-															✖																														
Lehigh	Patriot	1	-	-	-	-	-																	✖																												
Southern	SWAC	1	-	-	-	-	-																		✖																											
Georgia State	Sun Belt	1	-	-	-	-	-																				✖																									
Northeastern	CAA	1	-	-	-	-	-																					✖																								
William & Mary	CAA	1	-	-	-	-	-																					✖																								
UT Martin	Ohio Valley	1	-	-	-	-	-																						✖																							
Nicholls	Southland	1	-	-	-	-	-																							✖																						
Virginia Tech	ACC	1	-	-	-	-	-																														32															
Cal State Fullerton	Big West	1	-	-	-	-	-																														✖															
South Carolina State	MEAC	1	-	-	-	-	-																														✖															
Central Michigan	MAC	1	-	-	-	-	-																															✖														
Duquesne	Atlantic 10	1	-	-	-	-	-																																	✖												
IU Indy	Horizon	1	-	-	-	-	-																																	✖												
Northwestern State	Southland	1	-	-	-	-	-																																		✖											
Oakland	Horizon	1	-	-	-	-	-																																		✖											
Seton Hall	Big East	1	-	-	-	-	-																																		✖											
Harvard	Ivy League	1	-	-	-	-	-																																			✖										
Southern Illinois	Missouri Valley	1	-	-	-	-	-																																			✖										
UNC Wilmington	CAA	1	-	-	-	-	-																																			✖										
UT Rio Grande Valley	Southland	1	-	-	-	-	-																																				✖									
Syracuse	ACC	1	-	-	-	-	-																																						32							
Bryant	America East	1	-	-	-	-	-																																						✖							
Eastern Michigan	MAC	1	-	-	-	-	-																																						✖							
Navy	Patriot	1	-	-	-	-	-																																						✖							
Northern Kentucky	Horizon	1	-	-	-	-	-																																							✖						
North Carolina A&T	CAA	1	-	-	-	-	-																																								32					
Mississippi State	SEC	1	-	-	-	-	-																																									✖				
The Citadel	Southern	1	-	-	-	-	-																																									✖				
UIC	Missouri Valley	1	-	-	-	-	-																																									✖				
West Virginia	Big 12	1	-	-	-	-	-																																									✖				
Fairleigh Dickinson	NEC	1	-	-	-	-	-																																										✖			
Quinnipiac	Metro	1	-	-	-	-	-																																										✖			
Grand Canyon	Mountain West	1	-	-	-	-	-																																											✖		
Omaha	Summit	1	-	-	-	-	-																																											✖		
Chicago State	NEC	1	-	-	-	-	-																																												✖	
St. Thomas	Summit	1	-	-	-	-	-																																													✖
Toledo	MAC	1	-	-	-	-	-																																													✖
Texas Southern	SWAC	-	-	-	-	-	-														P																															
Grambling State	SWAC	-	-	-	-	-	-																P	P																												
Wagner	NEC	-	-	-	-	-	-																	P																												

=== Champions by decade ===
==== 1980s ====
3	Hawaiʻi

2	Pacific

1	Long Beach State, Texas, UCLA, USC

==== 1990s ====
4	Stanford

2	Long Beach State, UCLA

1	Nebraska, Penn State

==== 2000s ====
3	Penn State

2	Nebraska, Stanford, USC

1	Washington

==== 2010s ====
3	Penn State, Stanford

2	Nebraska

1	Texas, UCLA

==== 2020s ====
2	Texas

1	Kentucky

1	Penn State

1	Texas A&M

1	Wisconsin

=== Winners of two or more consecutive championships ===
Wins	Team	Years
4	Penn State	2007–2010
2	Hawaiʻi	1982, 1983
2	Pacific	1985, 1986
2	UCLA	1990, 1991
2	Stanford	1996, 1997, 2018, 2019
2	USC	2002, 2003
2	Penn State	2013, 2014
2	Texas	2022, 2023

=== Common matchups in Championship Final ===
# of Times	Matchup	Record	Years Played
4	Penn State vs Stanford	Penn State 3–1	1997, 1999, 2007, 2008
3	Nebraska vs Texas	Nebraska 2–1	1995, 2015, 2023
3	Stanford vs UCLA	Stanford 2–1	1984, 1992, 1994
2	Hawaiʻi vs Stanford	Tied 1–1	1987, 1996
2	Long Beach State vs Penn State	Long Beach State 2–0	1993, 1998
2	Nebraska vs Stanford	Tied 1–1	2006, 2018
2	Nebraska vs Wisconsin	Tied 1–1	2000, 2021

=== Champions by state ===
Champions by state
State	Wins	Years won
California	21	1981, 1984–1986, 1989–1994, 1996–1998, 2001–2004, 2011, 2016, 2018, 2019
Pennsylvania	8	1999, 2007–2010, 2013, 2014, 2024
Nebraska	5	1995, 2000, 2006, 2015, 2017
Texas	5	1988, 2012, 2022, 2023, 2025
Hawaii	3	1982, 1983, 1987
Kentucky	1	2020
Washington	1	2005
Wisconsin	1	2021

=== Final Four appearances ===
Team	Number	Champion	Runner-up	Semifinalist
Stanford	23	9	8	6
Cal	2	0	1	1
Pittsburgh	5	0	0	5
Louisville	3	0	2	1
Florida State	1	0	0	1
UCLA	12	4	4	4
USC	10	3	1	6
Washington	5	1	0	4
Oregon	1	0	1	0
Nebraska	18	5	6	7
Penn State	14	8	3	3
Minnesota	6	0	1	5
Wisconsin	7	1	3	3
Illinois	4	0	1	3
Ohio State	2	0	0	2
Michigan State	1	0	0	1
Michigan	1	0	0	1
Florida	8	0	2	6
LSU	2	0	0	2
Kentucky	2	1	1	0
Tennessee	1	0	0	1
Texas	14	4	5	5
Texas A&M	1	1	0	0
BYU	3	0	1	2
Arizona	1	0	0	1
Baylor	1	0	0	1
Kansas	1	0	0	1
Pacific	7	2	1	4
Santa Clara	1	0	0	1
San Diego	1	0	0	1
Hawaiʻi	9	3	2	4
Long Beach State	8	3	2	3
San Diego State	2	0	0	2
San Jose State	1	0	0	1
UT Arlington	1	0	0	1

=== Current conference key ===
Pac 12
Big Ten
SEC
Big 12
ACC
West Coast
Big West
Mountain West
WAC

=== Records ===
- Highest attendance: 21,860 (2024 Louisville-Penn State championship match)
- Lowest attendance for a championship match: 0 (2020) (Note: The lowest attendance for a championship match with no artificial attendance restrictions was 2,000 for the 1983 final.)
- Lowest seed to win championship: 11 (Stanford, 2004)
- Lowest seed in championship game: Unseeded (BYU, 2014)
- Most championships: Stanford (9)
- Most consecutive championships: Penn State (4, 2007–10)
- Most consecutive postseason victories: Penn State (26)
- Most championships by a head coach: Russ Rose (7)
- Most championships by conference: Pac-12 (17)
- Most appearances in championship match: Stanford (17)
- Most semifinal appearances: Stanford (23)
- Most semifinal appearances without a championship: Florida (8)
- Undefeated seasons (since 1981): Long Beach State (1998), Nebraska (2000), USC (2003), Penn State (2008, 2009)

=== Most Outstanding Player ===
In 1991 and now annually since 1996, the NCAA has awarded the most outstanding player(s) of the NCAA championship.

Year	Most Outstanding Player	School
1991	Natalie Williams; Antoinnette White	UCLA; Long Beach State
1996	Kerri Walsh	Stanford
1997	Terri Zemaitis	Penn State
1998	Misty May; Lauren Cacciamani	Long Beach State (2); Penn State (2)
1999	Lauren Cacciamani (2)	Penn State (3)
2000	Greichaly Cepero	Nebraska
2001	Logan Tom	Stanford (2)
2002	Keao Burdine	Southern California
2003	Keao Burdine (2)	Southern California (2)
2004	Ogonna Nnamani	Stanford (3)
2005	Christal Morrison	Washington
2006	Sarah Pavan	Nebraska (2)
2007	Megan Hodge	Penn State (4)
2008	Megan Hodge (2)	Penn State (5)
2009	Destinee Hooker	Texas
2010	Deja McClendon	Penn State (6)
2011	Rachael Kidder	UCLA (2)
2012	Bailey Webster	Texas (2)
2013	Micha Hancock	Penn State (7)
2014	Megan Courtney	Penn State (8)
2015	Mikaela Foecke	Nebraska (3)
2016	Inky Ajanaku	Stanford (4)
2017	Mikaela Foecke (2); Kelly Hunter	Nebraska (4,5)
2018	Morgan Hentz; Kathryn Plummer	Stanford (5,6)
2019	Kathryn Plummer (2)	Stanford (7)
2020	Madison Lilley	Kentucky
2021	Anna Smrek	Wisconsin
2022	Logan Eggleston	Texas (3)
2023	Madisen Skinner	Texas (4)
2024	Jess Mruzik	Penn State (9)
2025	Kyndal Stowers	Texas A&M

== See also ==
- AIAW Intercollegiate Women's Volleyball Champions
- NAIA Volleyball Championship
- NCAA men's volleyball tournament (National Collegiate division)
- NCAA Division II women's volleyball tournament
- NCAA Division III men's volleyball tournament
- NCAA Division III women's volleyball tournament
- American Volleyball Coaches Association (AVCA)
