= List of NCAA Division I women's volleyball programs =

This is a list of schools who field women's volleyball teams in Division I of the National Collegiate Athletic Association (NCAA) in the United States.

As of the 2025 season, 348 of the 365 Division I member institutions sponsor women's volleyball. (Note: Non-sponsoring Division I members are Boston University, Detroit Mercy, Drexel, La Salle, Longwood, Maine, Monmouth, Mount St. Mary's, Oklahoma State, Richmond, St. Bonaventure, Saint Joseph's, UMass, UMass Lowell, Vermont, VMI, and Wagner.) Conference affiliations and venues represent those for the current 2026 NCAA women's volleyball season.

== Programs ==
School	Nickname	Home arena	Conference
University at Albany	Albany Great Danes	University Gymnasium	America East Conference
Binghamton University	Binghamton Bearcats	West Gym	America East Conference
Bryant University	Bryant Bulldogs	Chace Athletic Center	America East Conference
University of New Hampshire	New Hampshire Wildcats	Lundholm Gym	America East Conference
New Jersey Institute of Technology (NJIT)	NJIT Highlanders	Wellness and Events Center	America East Conference
University of Maryland, Baltimore County (UMBC)	UMBC Retrievers	UMBC Event Center	America East Conference
University of North Carolina at Charlotte (Charlotte)	Charlotte 49ers	Dale F. Halton Arena	American Conference
East Carolina University	East Carolina Pirates	Williams Arena at Minges Coliseum	American Conference
Florida Atlantic University	Florida Atlantic Owls	Eleanor R. Baldwin Arena	American Conference
University of Memphis	Memphis Tigers	Elma Roane Fieldhouse	American Conference
University of North Texas	North Texas Mean Green	North Texas Volleyball Center	American Conference
Rice University	Rice Owls	Tudor Fieldhouse	American Conference
University of South Florida	South Florida Bulls	Yuengling Center	American Conference
Temple University	Temple Owls	McGonigle Hall	American Conference
Tulane University	Tulane Green Wave	Devlin Fieldhouse	American Conference
University of Tulsa	Tulsa Golden Hurricane	Reynolds Center	American Conference
University of Alabama at Birmingham (UAB)	UAB Blazers	Bartow Arena	American Conference
University of Texas at San Antonio (UTSA)	UTSA Roadrunners	Convocation Center	American Conference
Wichita State University	Wichita State Shockers	Charles Koch Arena	American Conference
Davidson College	Davidson Wildcats	John M. Belk Arena	Atlantic 10 Conference
University of Dayton	Dayton Flyers	Thomas J. Frericks Center	Atlantic 10 Conference
Duquesne University	Duquesne Dukes	UPMC Cooper Fieldhouse	Atlantic 10 Conference
Fordham University	Fordham Rams	Rose Hill Gym	Atlantic 10 Conference
George Mason University	George Mason Patriots	Recreation Athletic Complex	Atlantic 10 Conference
George Washington University	George Washington Revolutionaries	Charles E. Smith Center	Atlantic 10 Conference
Loyola University Chicago (Loyola Chicago)	Loyola Ramblers	Joseph J. Gentile Arena	Atlantic 10 Conference
University of Rhode Island	Rhode Island Rams	Keaney Gymnasium	Atlantic 10 Conference
Saint Louis University	Saint Louis Billikens	Chaifetz Pavilion	Atlantic 10 Conference
Virginia Commonwealth University (VCU)	VCU Rams	Siegel Center	Atlantic 10 Conference
Boston College	Boston College Eagles	Power Gym	Atlantic Coast Conference
University of California, Berkeley (California)	California Golden Bears	Haas Pavilion	Atlantic Coast Conference
Clemson University	Clemson Tigers	Jervey Gym	Atlantic Coast Conference
Duke University	Duke Blue Devils	Cameron Indoor Stadium	Atlantic Coast Conference
Florida State University	Florida State Seminoles	Tully Gymnasium	Atlantic Coast Conference
Georgia Institute of Technology (Georgia Tech)	Georgia Tech Yellow Jackets	O'Keefe Gymnasium	Atlantic Coast Conference
University of Louisville	Louisville Cardinals	L&N Federal Credit Union Arena (primary); KFC Yum! Center (secondary)	Atlantic Coast Conference
University of Miami	Miami Hurricanes	James L. Knight Complex	Atlantic Coast Conference
North Carolina State University (NC State)	NC State Wolfpack	Reynolds Coliseum	Atlantic Coast Conference
University of North Carolina at Chapel Hill (North Carolina)	North Carolina Tar Heels	Carmichael Arena	Atlantic Coast Conference
University of Notre Dame	Notre Dame Fighting Irish	Purcell Pavilion	Atlantic Coast Conference
University of Pittsburgh	Pittsburgh Panthers	Fitzgerald Field House	Atlantic Coast Conference
Southern Methodist University (SMU)	SMU Mustangs	Moody Coliseum	Atlantic Coast Conference
Stanford University	Stanford Cardinal	Maples Pavilion	Atlantic Coast Conference
Syracuse University	Syracuse Orange	Women's Building	Atlantic Coast Conference
University of Virginia	Virginia Cavaliers	Memorial Gymnasium	Atlantic Coast Conference
Virginia Polytechnic Institute and State University (Virginia Tech)	Virginia Tech Hokies	Cassell Coliseum	Atlantic Coast Conference
Wake Forest University	Wake Forest Demon Deacons	Reynolds Gymnasium	Atlantic Coast Conference
Bellarmine University	Bellarmine Knights	Knights Hall	Atlantic Sun Conference
Florida Gulf Coast University	Florida Gulf Coast Eagles	Alico Arena	Atlantic Sun Conference
Jacksonville University	Jacksonville Dolphins	Swisher Gymnasium	Atlantic Sun Conference
Lipscomb University	Lipscomb Bisons	Allen Arena	Atlantic Sun Conference
University of North Florida	North Florida Ospreys	UNF Arena	Atlantic Sun Conference
Queens University of Charlotte	Queens Royals	Curry Arena	Atlantic Sun Conference
Stetson University	Stetson Hatters	Edmunds Center	Atlantic Sun Conference
University of West Florida (Note: Begins transition from Division II in July 2026; will not be eligible for the NCAA tournament until 2029.)	West Florida Argonauts	UWF Field House	Atlantic Sun Conference
University of Arizona	Arizona Wildcats	McKale Center	Big 12 Conference
Arizona State University	Arizona State Sun Devils	Desert Financial Arena	Big 12 Conference
Baylor University	Baylor Bears	Ferrell Center	Big 12 Conference
Brigham Young University (BYU)	BYU Cougars	Smith Fieldhouse	Big 12 Conference
University of Cincinnati	Cincinnati Bearcats	Fifth Third Arena	Big 12 Conference
University of Colorado Boulder (Colorado)	Colorado Buffaloes	CU Events Center	Big 12 Conference
University of Houston	Houston Cougars	Fertitta Center	Big 12 Conference
Iowa State University	Iowa State Cyclones	Hilton Coliseum	Big 12 Conference
University of Kansas	Kansas Jayhawks	Horejsi Family Athletics Center	Big 12 Conference
Kansas State University	Kansas State Wildcats	Ahearn Field House	Big 12 Conference
Texas Christian University (TCU)	TCU Horned Frogs	University Recreation Center	Big 12 Conference
Texas Tech University	Texas Tech Red Raiders	United Supermarkets Arena	Big 12 Conference
University of Central Florida (UCF)	UCF Knights	The Venue at UCF	Big 12 Conference
University of Utah	Utah Utes	Jon M. Huntsman Center	Big 12 Conference
West Virginia University	West Virginia Mountaineers	WVU Coliseum	Big 12 Conference
Butler University	Butler Bulldogs	Hinkle Fieldhouse	Big East Conference
Creighton University	Creighton Bluejays	D. J. Sokol Arena	Big East Conference
DePaul University	DePaul Blue Demons	McGrath–Phillips Arena	Big East Conference
Georgetown University	Georgetown Hoyas	McDonough Gymnasium	Big East Conference
Marquette University	Marquette Golden Eagles	Al McGuire Center	Big East Conference
Providence College	Providence Friars	Alumni Hall	Big East Conference
Seton Hall University	Seton Hall Pirates	Walsh Gymnasium	Big East Conference
St. John's University	St. John's Red Storm	Carnesecca Arena	Big East Conference
University of Connecticut (UConn)	UConn Huskies	Harry A. Gampel Pavilion	Big East Conference
Villanova University	Villanova Wildcats	Jake Nevin Field House	Big East Conference
Xavier University	Xavier Musketeers	Cintas Center	Big East Conference
Eastern Washington University	Eastern Washington Eagles	Reese Court	Big Sky Conference
University of Idaho	Idaho Vandals	Memorial Gymnasium	Big Sky Conference
Idaho State University	Idaho State Bengals	Reed Gym	Big Sky Conference
University of Montana	Montana Grizzlies	West Auxiliary Gymnasium	Big Sky Conference
Montana State University	Montana State Bobcats	Shroyer Gym	Big Sky Conference
Northern Arizona University	Northern Arizona Lumberjacks	J.C. Rolle Activity Center	Big Sky Conference
University of Northern Colorado	Northern Colorado Bears	Bank of Colorado Arena	Big Sky Conference
Portland State University	Portland State Vikings	Peter Stott Center	Big Sky Conference
Southern Utah University	Southern Utah Thunderbirds	America First Event Center	Big Sky Conference
Utah Tech University	Utah Tech Trailblazers	Old Gym	Big Sky Conference
Weber State University	Weber State Wildcats	Swenson Gym	Big Sky Conference
Charleston Southern University	Charleston Southern Buccaneers	Buccaneer Field House	Big South Conference
Gardner-Webb University	Gardner-Webb Runnin' Bulldogs	Paul Porter Arena	Big South Conference
High Point University	High Point Panthers	Millis Center	Big South Conference
Presbyterian College	Presbyterian Blue Hose	Templeton Center	Big South Conference
Radford University	Radford Highlanders	Dedmon Center	Big South Conference
University of North Carolina Asheville (UNC Asheville)	UNC Asheville Bulldogs	Justice Center	Big South Conference
University of South Carolina Upstate (USC Upstate)	USC Upstate Spartans	Hodge Center	Big South Conference
Winthrop University	Winthrop Eagles	Winthrop Coliseum	Big South Conference
University of Illinois Urbana–Champaign (Illinois)	Illinois Fighting Illini	Huff Hall	Big Ten Conference
Indiana University Bloomington (Indiana)	Indiana Hoosiers	University Gym	Big Ten Conference
University of Iowa	Iowa Hawkeyes	Xtream Arena	Big Ten Conference
University of Maryland, College Park (Maryland)	Maryland Terrapins	Xfinity Center Pavilion	Big Ten Conference
University of Michigan	Michigan Wolverines	Cliff Keen Arena	Big Ten Conference
Michigan State University	Michigan State Spartans	Jenison Field House	Big Ten Conference
University of Minnesota, Twin Cities (Minnesota)	Minnesota Golden Gophers	The Sports Pavilion	Big Ten Conference
University of Nebraska–Lincoln (Nebraska)	Nebraska Cornhuskers	Bob Devaney Sports Center	Big Ten Conference
Northwestern University	Northwestern Wildcats	Welsh–Ryan Arena	Big Ten Conference
The Ohio State University	Ohio State Buckeyes	St. John Arena	Big Ten Conference
University of Oregon	Oregon Ducks	Matthew Knight Arena	Big Ten Conference
Pennsylvania State University (Penn State)	Penn State Nittany Lions	Rec Hall	Big Ten Conference
Purdue University	Purdue Boilermakers	Holloway Gymnasium	Big Ten Conference
Rutgers, The State University of New Jersey, New Brunswick (Rutgers)	Rutgers Scarlet Knights	College Avenue Gymnasium	Big Ten Conference
University of California, Los Angeles (UCLA)	UCLA Bruins	Pauley Pavilion	Big Ten Conference
University of Southern California (USC)	USC Trojans	Galen Center	Big Ten Conference
University of Washington	Washington Huskies	Hec Edmundson Pavilion	Big Ten Conference
University of Wisconsin–Madison (Wisconsin)	Wisconsin Badgers	Wisconsin Field House	Big Ten Conference
California Polytechnic State University (Cal Poly)	Cal Poly Mustangs	Mott Athletics Center	Big West Conference
California State University, Bakersfield (Bakersfield, CSU Bakersfield, or Cal State Bakersfield)	Bakersfield Roadrunners	Icardo Center	Big West Conference
California State University, Fullerton (Cal State Fullerton)	Cal State Fullerton Titans	Titan Gym	Big West Conference
California State University, Northridge (Cal State Northridge or CSUN)	Cal State Northridge Matadors	Matadome	Big West Conference
California Baptist University (alternately CBU)	California Baptist Lancers	Van Dyne Gym	Big West Conference
California State University, Long Beach (Long Beach State)	The Beach (or Long Beach State Beach)	Walter Pyramid	Big West Conference
California State University, Sacramento (Sacramento State)	Sacramento State Hornets	Hornets Nest	Big West Conference
University of California, Irvine (UC Irvine)	UC Irvine Anteaters	Bren Events Center	Big West Conference
University of California, Riverside (UC Riverside)	UC Riverside Highlanders	Student Recreation Center Arena	Big West Conference
University of California, San Diego (UC San Diego)	UC San Diego Tritons	LionTree Arena	Big West Conference (Note: Joining the West Coast Conference in 2027.)
University of California, Santa Barbara (UC Santa Barbara)	UC Santa Barbara Gauchos	Thunderdome	Big West Conference
Utah Valley University	Utah Valley Wolverines	PE Building	Big West Conference
Campbell University	Campbell Fighting Camels	Pope Convocation Center	Coastal Athletic Association
College of Charleston (Charleston)	Charleston Cougars	TD Arena	Coastal Athletic Association
Elon University	Elon Phoenix	Schar Center	Coastal Athletic Association
Hampton University	Hampton Pirates	Holland Hall	Coastal Athletic Association
Hofstra University	Hofstra Pride	David S. Mack Physical Education Center	Coastal Athletic Association
North Carolina A&T State University (North Carolina A&T)	North Carolina A&T Aggies	Corbett Sports Center	Coastal Athletic Association
Northeastern University	Northeastern Huskies	Cabot Center	Coastal Athletic Association
Stony Brook University	Stony Brook Seawolves	Pritchard Gymnasium	Coastal Athletic Association
Towson University	Towson Tigers	SECU Arena	Coastal Athletic Association
University of North Carolina Wilmington (UNCW or UNC Wilmington)	UNCW Seahawks	Hanover Hall	Coastal Athletic Association
College of William & Mary	William & Mary Tribe	Kaplan Arena	Coastal Athletic Association
University of Delaware	Delaware Fightin' Blue Hens	Bob Carpenter Center	Conference USA
Florida International University (FIU)	FIU Panthers	FIU Arena	Conference USA
Jacksonville State University	Jacksonville State Gamecocks	Pete Mathews Coliseum	Conference USA
Kennesaw State University	Kennesaw State Owls	KSU Convocation Center	Conference USA
Liberty University	Liberty Lady Flames	Liberty Arena	Conference USA
Middle Tennessee State University (Middle Tennessee)	Middle Tennessee Blue Raiders	Alumni Memorial Gym	Conference USA
Missouri State University	Missouri State Bears	Hammons Student Center	Conference USA
New Mexico State University	New Mexico State Aggies	Pan American Center	Conference USA
Sam Houston State University	Sam Houston Bearkats	Bernard Johnson Coliseum	Conference USA
Western Kentucky University	WKU Lady Toppers	E. A. Diddle Arena	Conference USA
Cleveland State University	Cleveland State Vikings	Woodling Gym	Horizon League
University of Wisconsin–Green Bay (Green Bay)	Green Bay Phoenix	Kress Events Center	Horizon League
Indiana University Indianapolis (IU Indy) (Note: The Indiana University and Purdue University systems dissolved Indiana University–Purdue University Indianapolis after the 2023–24 academic year, replacing it with separate IU- and Purdue-affiliated institutions. The IUPUI athletic program transferred to the new IU Indianapolis, which is home to the vast majority of current IUPUI academic programs. The official athletic website is using "IU Indy" branding.)	IU Indy Jaguars	The Jungle; James T. Morris Arena (Note: The Jaguars played home matches at The Jungle before the October 16, 2026 opening of James T. Morris Arena. All remaining home matches were at the newer venue.)	Horizon League
University of Wisconsin–Milwaukee (Milwaukee)	Milwaukee Panthers	Klotsche Center	Horizon League
Northern Illinois University (NIU or Northern Illinois)	Northern Illinois Huskies	Victor E. Court	Horizon League
Northern Kentucky University	Northern Kentucky Norse	Regents Hall	Horizon League
Oakland University	Oakland Golden Grizzlies	OU Credit Union O'rena	Horizon League
Purdue University Fort Wayne (Purdue Fort Wayne)	Purdue Fort Wayne Mastodons	Hilliard Gates Sports Center	Horizon League
Robert Morris University	Robert Morris Colonials	UPMC Events Center	Horizon League
Wright State University	Wright State Raiders	C.J. McLin Gymnasium	Horizon League
Youngstown State University	Youngstown State Penguins	Beeghly Center	Horizon League
Brown University	Brown Bears	Pizzitola Sports Center	Ivy League
Columbia University	Columbia Lions	Levien Gymnasium	Ivy League
Cornell University	Cornell Big Red	Newman Arena	Ivy League
Dartmouth College	Dartmouth Big Green	Leede Arena	Ivy League
Harvard University	Harvard Crimson	Malkin Athletic Center	Ivy League
University of Pennsylvania (Penn)	Penn Quakers	Palestra	Ivy League
Princeton University	Princeton Tigers	Dillon Gymnasium	Ivy League
Yale University	Yale Bulldogs	Payne Whitney Gymnasium	Ivy League
Canisius University	Canisius Golden Griffins	Koessler Athletic Center	Metro Conference
Fairfield University	Fairfield Stags	Leo D. Mahoney Arena	Metro Conference (Note: Joining the Coastal Athletic Association in 2027.)
Iona University	Iona Gaels	Hynes Athletic Center	Metro Conference
Manhattan University	Manhattan Jaspers	Draddy Gymnasium	Metro Conference
Marist University	Marist Red Foxes	McCann Arena	Metro Conference
Merrimack College	Merrimack Warriors	Hammel Court	Metro Conference
Niagara University	Niagara Purple Eagles	Gallagher Center	Metro Conference
Quinnipiac University	Quinnipiac Bobcats	Burt Kahn Court	Metro Conference
Rider University	Rider Broncs	Alumni Gymnasium	Metro Conference
Sacred Heart University	Sacred Heart Pioneers	William H. Pitt Center	Metro Conference
Saint Peter's University	Saint Peter's Peacocks	Yanitelli Center	Metro Conference
Siena University	Siena Saints	Alumni Recreation Center	Metro Conference
University of Akron	Akron Zips	James A. Rhodes Arena	Mid-American Conference
Ball State University	Ball State Cardinals	Worthen Arena	Mid-American Conference
Bowling Green State University (Bowling Green)	Bowling Green Falcons	Stroh Center	Mid-American Conference
University at Buffalo, the State University of New York (Buffalo)	Buffalo Bulls	Alumni Arena	Mid-American Conference
Central Michigan University	Central Michigan Chippewas	McGuirk Arena	Mid-American Conference
Eastern Michigan University	Eastern Michigan Eagles	Convocation Center	Mid-American Conference
Kent State University	Kent State Golden Flashes	Memorial Athletic and Convocation Center	Mid-American Conference
Miami University (Miami (Ohio))	Miami RedHawks	Millett Hall	Mid-American Conference
Ohio University	Ohio Bobcats	Convocation Center	Mid-American Conference
University of Toledo	Toledo Rockets	Savage Arena	Mid-American Conference
Western Michigan University	Western Michigan Broncos	University Arena	Mid-American Conference
Coppin State University	Coppin State Eagles	Physical Education Complex	Mid-Eastern Athletic Conference
Delaware State University	Delaware State Hornets	Memorial Hall	Mid-Eastern Athletic Conference
Howard University	Howard Bison	Burr Gymnasium	Mid-Eastern Athletic Conference
University of Maryland Eastern Shore (UMES or Maryland Eastern Shore)	Maryland Eastern Shore Hawks	Hytche Athletic Center	Mid-Eastern Athletic Conference
Morgan State University	Morgan State Bears	Talmadge L. Hill Field House	Mid-Eastern Athletic Conference
Norfolk State University	Norfolk State Spartans	Joseph G. Echols Memorial Hall	Mid-Eastern Athletic Conference
North Carolina Central University	North Carolina Central Eagles	McDougald–McLendon Arena	Mid-Eastern Athletic Conference
South Carolina State University	South Carolina State Bulldogs	Dukes Gymnasium	Mid-Eastern Athletic Conference
Belmont University	Belmont Bruins	Curb Event Center	Missouri Valley Conference
Bradley University	Bradley Braves	Renaissance Coliseum	Missouri Valley Conference
Drake University	Drake Bulldogs	Knapp Center	Missouri Valley Conference
University of Evansville	Evansville Purple Aces	Meeks Family Fieldhouse	Missouri Valley Conference
Illinois State University	Illinois State Redbirds	Redbird Arena	Missouri Valley Conference
Indiana State University	Indiana State Sycamores	ISU Arena	Missouri Valley Conference
Murray State University	Murray State Racers	Racer Arena	Missouri Valley Conference
University of Northern Iowa (alternately UNI)	Northern Iowa Panthers	McLeod Center	Missouri Valley Conference
Southern Illinois University Carbondale (Southern Illinois)	Southern Illinois Salukis	Davies Gym	Missouri Valley Conference
University of Illinois Chicago (UIC)	UIC Flames	Flames Athletic Center	Missouri Valley Conference
Valparaiso University	Valparaiso Beacons	Athletics–Recreation Center	Missouri Valley Conference
United States Air Force Academy (Air Force)	Air Force Falcons	Clune Arena	Mountain West Conference
Grand Canyon University	Grand Canyon Antelopes	Antelope Gymnasium	Mountain West Conference
University of Hawaiʻi at Mānoa (Hawaiʻi)	Hawaiʻi Rainbow Wahine	Stan Sheriff Center	Mountain West Conference
University of Nevada, Reno (Nevada)	Nevada Wolf Pack	Virginia Street Gym	Mountain West Conference
University of New Mexico	New Mexico Lobos	Johnson Center	Mountain West Conference
San Jose State University	San Jose State Spartans	Spartan Gym	Mountain West Conference
University of California, Davis (UC Davis)	UC Davis Aggies	University Credit Union Center	Mountain West Conference
University of Nevada, Las Vegas (UNLV)	UNLV Rebels	Cox Pavilion	Mountain West Conference
University of Texas at El Paso (UTEP)	UTEP Miners	Memorial Gymnasium	Mountain West Conference
University of Wyoming	Wyoming Cowgirls	UniWyo Sports Complex	Mountain West Conference
Central Connecticut State University (Central Connecticut)	Central Connecticut Blue Devils	William H. Detrick Gymnasium	NEC
Chicago State University	Chicago State Cougars	Dickens Athletic Center	NEC
Fairleigh Dickinson University	Fairleigh Dickinson Knights	Rothman Center	NEC
Le Moyne College	Le Moyne Dolphins	Ted Grant Court	NEC (Note: Joining the Metro Conference in 2027.)
Long Island University (LIU)	LIU Sharks	Steinberg Wellness Center	NEC
Mercyhurst University (Note: Began transition from Division II in July 2024; will not be eligible for the NCAA tournament until 2027.)	Mercyhurst Lakers	Mercyhurst Athletic Center	NEC
University of New Haven (Note: Began transition from Division II in July 2025; will not be eligible for the NCAA tournament until 2028.)	New Haven Chargers	Jeffery P. Hazell Athletics Center	NEC
Stonehill College	Stonehill Skyhawks	Merkert Gymnasium	NEC
Eastern Illinois University	Eastern Illinois Panthers	Lantz Arena	Ohio Valley Conference
Lindenwood University	Lindenwood Lions	Robert F. Hyland Performance Arena	Ohio Valley Conference
Morehead State University	Morehead State Eagles	Wetherby Gymnasium	Ohio Valley Conference
Southern Illinois University Edwardsville (SIU Edwardsville or SIUE)	SIU Edwardsville Cougars	Vadalabene Center	Ohio Valley Conference
Southeast Missouri State University (Southeast Missouri or SEMO)	Southeast Missouri State Redhawks	Houck Field House	Ohio Valley Conference
University of Southern Indiana	Southern Indiana Screaming Eagles	Liberty Arena	Ohio Valley Conference
Tennessee State University	Tennessee State Tigers	Kean Hall	Ohio Valley Conference
University of Tennessee at Martin (UT Martin)	UT Martin Skyhawks	Skyhawk Fieldhouse	Ohio Valley Conference
Western Illinois University	Western Illinois Leathernecks	Western Hall	Ohio Valley Conference
Boise State University	Boise State Broncos	Bronco Gym	Pac-12 Conference
Colorado State University	Colorado State Rams	Moby Arena	Pac-12 Conference
California State University, Fresno (Fresno State)	Fresno State Bulldogs	Save Mart Center	Pac-12 Conference
Gonzaga University	Gonzaga Bulldogs	Charlotte Y. Martin Centre	Pac-12 Conference
Oregon State University	Oregon State Beavers	Gill Coliseum	Pac-12 Conference
San Diego State University	San Diego State Aztecs	Peterson Gym	Pac-12 Conference
Texas State University	Texas State Bobcats	Strahan Coliseum	Pac-12 Conference
Utah State University	Utah State Aggies	Wayne Estes Center	Pac-12 Conference
Washington State University	Washington State Cougars	Bohler Gymnasium	Pac-12 Conference
American University	American Eagles	Bender Arena	Patriot League
United States Military Academy (Army)	Army Black Knights	Gillis Field House	Patriot League
Bucknell University	Bucknell Bison	Davis Gym	Patriot League
Colgate University	Colgate Raiders	Cotterell Court	Patriot League
College of the Holy Cross	Holy Cross Crusaders	Hart Center	Patriot League
Lafayette College	Lafayette Leopards	Kirby Sports Center	Patriot League
Lehigh University	Lehigh Mountain Hawks	Leeman–Turner Arena at Grace Hall	Patriot League
Loyola University Maryland (Loyola Maryland)	Loyola Greyhounds	Reitz Arena	Patriot League
United States Naval Academy (Navy)	Navy Midshipmen	Wesley Brown Field House	Patriot League
University of Alabama	Alabama Crimson Tide	Foster Auditorium	Southeastern Conference
University of Arkansas	Arkansas Razorbacks	Barnhill Arena	Southeastern Conference
Auburn University	Auburn Tigers	Neville Arena	Southeastern Conference
University of Florida	Florida Gators	Exactech Arena at Stephen C. O'Connell Center	Southeastern Conference
University of Georgia	Georgia Bulldogs	Ramsey Center	Southeastern Conference
University of Kentucky	Kentucky Wildcats	Memorial Coliseum	Southeastern Conference
Louisiana State University (LSU)	LSU Tigers	Pete Maravich Assembly Center	Southeastern Conference
Mississippi State University	Mississippi State Bulldogs	Newell–Grissom Building (primary); Humphrey Coliseum (secondary)	Southeastern Conference
University of Missouri–Columbia (Missouri)	Missouri Tigers	Hearnes Center	Southeastern Conference
University of Mississippi (Ole Miss)	Ole Miss Rebels	Gillom Sports Center	Southeastern Conference
University of Oklahoma	Oklahoma Sooners	McCasland Field House	Southeastern Conference
University of South Carolina	South Carolina Gamecocks	Carolina Volleyball Center	Southeastern Conference
University of Tennessee	Tennessee Volunteers	Thompson–Boling Arena	Southeastern Conference
University of Texas at Austin (Texas)	Texas Longhorns	Gregory Gymnasium	Southeastern Conference
Texas A&M University	Texas A&M Aggies	Reed Arena	Southeastern Conference
Vanderbilt University	Vanderbilt Commodores	Memorial Gymnasium	Southeastern Conference
University of Tennessee at Chattanooga (Chattanooga)	Chattanooga Mocs	Maclellan Gymnasium	Southern Conference
The Citadel, The Military College of South Carolina (The Citadel)	The Citadel Bulldogs	McAlister Field House	Southern Conference
East Tennessee State University	East Tennessee State Buccaneers	J. Madison Brooks Gymnasium	Southern Conference
Furman University	Furman Paladins	Alley Gymnasium	Southern Conference
Mercer University	Mercer Bears	Hawkins Arena	Southern Conference
Samford University	Samford Bulldogs	Pete Hanna Center	Southern Conference
Tennessee Tech University	Tennessee Tech Golden Eagles	Hooper Eblen Center	Southern Conference
University of North Carolina at Greensboro (UNC Greensboro or UNCG)	UNC Greensboro Spartans	Fleming Gymnasium	Southern Conference
Western Carolina University	Western Carolina Catamounts	Ramsey Center	Southern Conference
Wofford College	Wofford Terriers	Jerry Richardson Indoor Stadium	Southern Conference
East Texas A&M University	East Texas A&M Lions	The Field House	Southland Conference
Houston Christian University	Houston Christian Huskies	Sharp Gymnasium	Southland Conference
University of the Incarnate Word (alternately UIW)	Incarnate Word Cardinals	McDermott Center	Southland Conference
Lamar University	Lamar Lady Cardinals	McDonald Gym	Southland Conference
LSU New Orleans	LSU New Orleans Privateers	Human Performance Center	Southland Conference
McNeese State University (McNeese)	McNeese Cowgirls	Townsley Law Arena	Southland Conference
Nicholls State University (Nicholls)	Nicholls Colonels	Stopher Gymnasium	Southland Conference
Northwestern State University	Northwestern State Demons	Prather Coliseum	Southland Conference
Southeastern Louisiana University	Southeastern Louisiana Lions	University Center	Southland Conference
Stephen F. Austin State University (Stephen F. Austin or SFA)	Stephen F. Austin Ladyjacks	William R. Johnson Coliseum	Southland Conference
Texas A&M University-Corpus Christi (Texas A&M-Corpus Christi)	Texas A&M-Corpus Christi Islanders	Dugan Wellness Center	Southland Conference
University of Texas Rio Grande Valley (UT Rio Grande Valley or UTRGV)	UT Rio Grande Valley Vaqueros	UTRGV Fieldhouse	Southland Conference
Alabama A&M University	Alabama A&M Bulldogs	Elmore Gymnasium	Southwestern Athletic Conference
Alabama State University	Alabama State Hornets	Lockhart Gymnasium	Southwestern Athletic Conference
Alcorn State University	Alcorn State Braves	Davey Whitney Complex	Southwestern Athletic Conference
University of Arkansas, Pine Bluff (Arkansas–Pine Bluff)	Arkansas–Pine Bluff Golden Lions	K. L. Johnson Complex	Southwestern Athletic Conference
Bethune–Cookman University	Bethune–Cookman Wildcats	Moore Gymnasium	Southwestern Athletic Conference
Florida A&M University	Florida A&M Rattlers	Teaching Gym	Southwestern Athletic Conference
Grambling State University	Grambling State Tigers	Memorial Gymnasium	Southwestern Athletic Conference
Jackson State University	Jackson State Tigers	T. B. Ellis Gymnasium	Southwestern Athletic Conference
Mississippi Valley State University	Mississippi Valley State Devilettes	Harrison HPER Complex	Southwestern Athletic Conference
Prairie View A&M University	Prairie View A&M Panthers	William J. Nicks Building	Southwestern Athletic Conference
Southern University	Southern Jaguars	Clifford Seymour Gymnasium	Southwestern Athletic Conference
Texas Southern University	Texas Southern Tigers	Health and Physical Education Arena	Southwestern Athletic Conference
University of Missouri-Kansas City (Kansas City)	Kansas City Roos	Swinney Recreation Center	The Summit League
University of North Dakota	North Dakota Fighting Hawks	Betty Engelstad Sioux Center	The Summit League
North Dakota State University	North Dakota State Bison	Bentson Bunker Fieldhouse	The Summit League
University of Nebraska Omaha (Omaha)	Omaha Mavericks	Baxter Arena	The Summit League
Oral Roberts University	Oral Roberts Golden Eagles	Cooper Aerobics Center	The Summit League
University of St. Thomas	St. Thomas Tommies	Lee & Penny Anderson Arena	The Summit League
University of South Dakota	South Dakota Coyotes	Sanford Coyote Sports Center	The Summit League
South Dakota State University	South Dakota State Jackrabbits	First Bank and Trust Arena	The Summit League
Appalachian State University	Appalachian State Mountaineers	George M. Holmes Convocation Center	Sun Belt Conference
Arkansas State University	Arkansas State Red Wolves	Convocation Center	Sun Belt Conference
Coastal Carolina University	Coastal Carolina Chanticleers	HTC Center	Sun Belt Conference
Georgia Southern University	Georgia Southern Eagles	Hanner Fieldhouse	Sun Belt Conference
Georgia State University	Georgia State Panthers	GSU Sports Arena	Sun Belt Conference
James Madison University	James Madison Dukes	Convocation Center	Sun Belt Conference
University of Louisiana at Lafayette (Louisiana)	Louisiana Ragin' Cajuns	Earl K. Long Gymnasium	Sun Belt Conference
Louisiana Tech University	Louisiana Tech Lady Techsters	Thomas Assembly Center	Sun Belt Conference
Marshall University	Marshall Thundering Herd	Cam Henderson Center	Sun Belt Conference
Old Dominion University	Old Dominion Monarchs	Chartway Arena	Sun Belt Conference
University of South Alabama	South Alabama Jaguars	Jag Gymnasium	Sun Belt Conference
The University of Southern Mississippi (Southern Miss)	Southern Miss Lady Eagles	Reed Green Coliseum	Sun Belt Conference
Troy University	Troy Trojans	Trojan Arena	Sun Belt Conference
University of Louisiana at Monroe (ULM or Louisiana–Monroe)	ULM Warhawks	Fant–Ewing Coliseum	Sun Belt Conference
Abilene Christian University	Abilene Christian Wildcats	Moody Coliseum	United Athletic Conference
Austin Peay State University (Austin Peay)	Austin Peay Governors	Dunn Center	United Athletic Conference
University of Central Arkansas	Central Arkansas Sugar Bears	Prince Center	United Athletic Conference
Eastern Kentucky University	Eastern Kentucky Colonels	Baptist Health Arena	United Athletic Conference
University of Arkansas at Little Rock (Little Rock)	Little Rock Trojans	Jack Stephens Center	United Athletic Conference
University of North Alabama	North Alabama Lions	Flowers Hall	United Athletic Conference
Tarleton State University (alternately Tarleton)	Tarleton State Texans	Wisdom Volleyball Gym	United Athletic Conference
University of Texas at Arlington	UT Arlington Mavericks	College Park Center	United Athletic Conference
University of West Georgia	West Georgia Wolves	The Coliseum	United Athletic Conference
University of Denver	Denver Pioneers	Hamilton Gymnasium	West Coast Conference
Loyola Marymount University	Loyola Marymount Lions	Gersten Pavilion	West Coast Conference
University of the Pacific	Pacific Tigers	Alex G. Spanos Center	West Coast Conference
Pepperdine University	Pepperdine Waves	Firestone Fieldhouse	West Coast Conference
University of Portland	Portland Pilots	Chiles Center	West Coast Conference
University of San Diego	San Diego Toreros	Jenny Craig Pavilion	West Coast Conference
University of San Francisco	San Francisco Dons	The Sobrato Center	West Coast Conference
Santa Clara University	Santa Clara Broncos	Leavey Center	West Coast Conference
Saint Mary's College of California (Saint Mary's)	Saint Mary's Gaels	McKeon Pavilion	West Coast Conference
Seattle University	Seattle Redhawks	Connolly Center	West Coast Conference

== Future programs ==
School	Nickname	Home arena	Future conference	Effective date
Longwood University	Longwood Lancers	Joan Perry Brock Center	Big South Conference	2028

== See also ==
- NCAA Division I women's volleyball tournament
- List of NCAA men's volleyball programs
