= William & Mary Tribe women's volleyball =

American college volleyball team

- University: College of William & Mary
- Head coach: Kellie Catanach Johnson (1st season)
- Conference: CAA
- Location: Williamsburg, Virginia, US
- Home arena: Kaplan Arena (capacity: 11,300)
- Nickname: Tribe
- Colors: Green and Gold

AIAW/NCAA tournament appearance
- 2001

Conference tournament champion
- 1985, 1986, 1987, 1988, 1989, 1990, 1991, 2001

The William & Mary Tribe women's volleyball program represents the College of William & Mary in NCAA Division I women's volleyball.

== Postseason ==
=== NCAA Division I Tournament ===
The Tribe have appeared in the NCAA Division I Women's Volleyball Championship once. They have a record of 0–1.

Year	Round	Opponent	Result
2001	First round	Duke	L 0–3

== See also ==
- List of NCAA Division I women's volleyball programs
