= Buffalo Bulls women's volleyball =

American college volleyball team

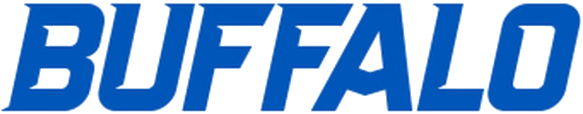
- University: State University of New York at Buffalo
- Head coach: Scott Smith (1st season)
- Conference: MAC; East Division
- Location: Buffalo, New York, US
- Home arena: Broadview Arena (capacity: 6,100)
- Nickname: Bulls
- Colors: Royal blue and white

For information on all University at Buffalo sports, see Buffalo Bulls

The Buffalo Bulls women's volleyball team represents the University at Buffalo in NCAA Division I college volleyball. The team participates in the East Division of the Mid-American Conference (MAC). The Bulls are currently led by first year coach Scott Smith, who took over in 2019 when the previous coach, Blair Brown Lipsitz, resigned. Smith was an assistant for four years under Lipsitz, and this is his first head coaching job at the NCAA level. The team plays its home games at Broadview Arena, located on the university's campus.

== Recent history ==
In 2013, under head coach Todd Kress, Buffalo finished 6–10 in the MAC, which was their most wins ever in conference; however, they finished ninth in conference because of unfavorable tie-breakers and so the Bulls did not advance to the Conference Tournament (only the top 8 teams advance). Kress was fired after the season.

In 2014, under head coach Reed Sunahara, Buffalo finished 6–10 again, but this time they were eighth in the conference, and for the first time in program history, the Bulls qualified for the round of eight in the Conference Tournament. Buffalo lost to Western Michigan 3–0 in that tournament game. Sunahara resigned to coach at West Virginia.

Buffalo hired Lipsitz, who had never coached before at the collegiate level. Buffalo finished the 2015 season at 6–10 in the MAC again, but this time it was good for seventh place based on tie-breakers, the team's highest finish ever in the MAC. In the MAC Tournament, Buffalo lost to Ball State 3–1, marking the first-ever victory in a set in a MAC Tournament Round of 8 match in the team's history. In 2016, Buffalo struggled and finished 3–13 in the MAC and did not make the MAC tournament. In 2017, Buffalo had its best year ever in the MAC, passing the previous high of 6 wins, with an 8–8 record and the #5 seed into the MAC tournament. In 2018, Buffalo again surpassed its previous win record in the MAC, finishing 10–6, and had the #4 seed in the MAC tournament. The Bulls did not win a MAC tournament match under Lipsitz.

In 2019, after a 1–5 start, Smith coached the Bulls to an 8–8 record in the MAC, defeating three teams that were leading the MAC at the time of the match. Buffalo would be the #7 seed in the MAC Tournament, and they won their first MAC Tournament "Round of 8" match, defeating #6 Akron 3–0. The Bulls then lost in the next round.

== MAC honorees ==
Buffalo has had several players in recent history earn All-MAC honors. In 2011, right-side hitter Liz Scott was named to the All-MAC Freshman team. In 2012, Scott was named to the All-MAC Second team. In 2013 and 2014, outside hitter Tahleia Bishop was named First Team All-MAC. In 2013, libero Kelly Svoboda was also named First Team All-MAC. The awards to Bishop and Svoboda in 2013 were the first-ever First Team All-MAC awards for any Bull. In addition, Svoboda was named MAC Defensive Player of the Year, the only Bull to ever win a MAC individual honor in volleyball. In 2014, middle blocker Cassie Shado was named to the All-MAC Freshman team, and in 2015 Shado and senior outside hitter Megan Lipski were named All-MAC Honorable Mention.

== See also ==
- List of NCAA Division I women's volleyball programs
