= Stetson Hatters women's volleyball =

American college volleyball team

- University: Stetson University
- Head coach: Yang Deng (5th season)
- Conference: ASUN
- Location: Deland, Florida, US
- Home arena: Edmunds Center (capacity: 5,000)
- Nickname: Hatters
- Colors: Hunter green and white

Conference tournament champion
- 1985

Conference regular season champion
- ASUN Conference; 1990

The Stetson Hatters women's volleyball team represents Stetson University in the ASUN Conference. They are currently led by head coach Yang Deng and play their home games at Edmunds Center. The team has won 1 ASUN Conference women's volleyball tournament in 1985, and has won 1 ASUN Conference regular season conference title in 1990.

== See also ==
- List of NCAA Division I women's volleyball programs
