= Marshall Thundering Herd women's volleyball =

American college volleyball team

- Founded: 1970; 56 years ago
- Head coach: Heather Stout (2nd season)
- Location: Huntington, West Virginia, U.S.
- Home arena: Cam Henderson Center
- Nickname: Thundering Herd
- Colors: Kelly green and white

AIAW/NCAA Tournament appearance
- 1995, 2005

Conference tournament champion
- 1988, 1995, 2005

Conference regular season champion
- 1996, 2005, 2007

The Marshall Thundering Herd women's volleyball team competes as part of NCAA Division I, representing Marshall University in the Sun Belt Conference. Marshall has played their home matches at the Cam Henderson Center in Huntington, West Virginia since 1981. The team's current head coach is Heather Stout, who was hired in February 2025.

== Historical Statistics ==
Overall
Years of Volleyball	55
1st Season	1970
Head Coaches	13
All-Time Record	834–846–4
SoCon games
SoCon W-L record (1984–1996)	62–63
SoCon Titles	2
SoCon Tournament Titles	1
MAC games
MAC W-L record (1997–2004)	62–76
MAC Titles	0
MAC Tournament Titles	0
CUSA games
CUSA W-L record (2005–2021)	142–122
CUSA Titles	2
CUSA Tournament Titles	1
Sun Belt games
Sun Belt W-L record (Since 2022)	13–35
Sun Belt Titles	0
Sun Belt Tournament Titles	0
NCAA Tournament
NCAA Appearances	2
NCAA W-L record	0–2
Final Fours	0
National Championships	0

*Statistics through 2024 season

== Postseason ==
=== NCAA tournament results ===
Marshall has been to the NCAA tournament twice. Their combined record is 0–2.

Year	Round	Opponent	Result
1995	First Round	Georgia	L 0–3
2005	First Round	#13 Oho State	L 0–3

== See also ==
- List of NCAA Division I women's volleyball programs
