= VCU Rams women's volleyball =

American college volleyball team

- University: Virginia Commonwealth University
- Head coach: Jody Rogers (2nd season)
- Conference: A10
- Location: Richmond, Virginia, US
- Home arena: Siegel Center (capacity: 7,500)
- Nickname: Rams
- Colors: Black and gold

AIAW/NCAA tournament appearance
- 2002, 2005, 2009, 2017, 2019

Conference tournament champion
- Colonial Athletic Association; 2005 Atlantic 10; 2017

Conference regular season champion
- Colonial Athletic Association; 2009 Atlantic 10; 2017

The VCU Rams women's volleyball program represents Virginia Commonwealth University in NCAA Division I women's volleyball.

== See also ==
- List of NCAA Division I women's volleyball programs
