= Georgia Southern Eagles women's volleyball =

American volleyball program

The Georgia Southern Eagles volleyball program was established in 1985. The team is currently led by head coach Chad Callihan. The Eagles compete in the Sun Belt Conference. Georgia Southern University does not have a men's team.

== Program history ==
Beginning in 1985, the Georgia Southern Volleyball program has been guided by a total of eight coaches. In years 2001, and 2003 the team was named Southern Conference Tournament Champions. This accomplishment took the team to the NCAA Tournament where they competed to earn a championship title. As of 2009 the overall record of the program was 353 wins, followed by 430 losses. Coming into the 2010 season, the team lost a total of 5 players: two freshmen, one junior, and one graduated senior. In return the team gained a total of four newcomers: three freshmen, and one junior.

== Hanner Fieldhouse ==
Hanner Fieldhouse was completed in 1969, and became a home to Georgia Southern's athletic programs. This facility is where the Volleyball team competes. The complex is named after W.S. Hanner, who was a past athletic chairman in the years 1935, through 1959. Also taking part in coaching tennis and football, Hanner served as a professor in the branch of Exercise Science. Hanner Fieldhouse not only houses athletic teams, but also is a home to "Health, Physical Education and Professional Studies." The Hanner Fieldhouse contains a large gym (capacity of 4,358), a small gym, athletic training room, team locker rooms, coach's offices, and a weight room.

== 2010 Season ==
The Lady Eagles started off with an early pre-season record of 8-6, playing teams such as Duke University, University of Miami, and Auburn University. At the start of conference play the Eagles then went on a 4 match winning streak, slowly to be ended to the College of Charleston. In response the team then came back and won 10 straight games, 5 of them being home games, and 9 being conference games. Within this winning streak the team had a chance to travel to Jacksonville to play North Florida for the ninth straight win. The team also had a home victory over Furman University, coming back in the game to defeat the Paladins in a five-game thriller. Despite the winning streak the College of Charleston once again took the victory away from the Eagles in Hanner Fieldhouse on November 6, and ended the home winning streak of 12 straight matches. This put the team ending the regular conference season at a record of 15-2, earning the second seed in the South Division. This brought them to the Southern Conference Tournament held at Appalachian State, in Boone, North Carolina. The Eagles started the first round of the Southern Conference Tournament with playing Appalachian State. Soon to take a victory and continue to the semi-final round the team then was set out to play Elon University. The Eagles defeated Elon and were headed to the final round of the Southern Conference Tournament to play the College of Charleston Cougars, who has given the Eagles their only regular season losses. The team swept the Cougars in the finals and were then named Southern Conference Champions of the 2010 season.

== See also ==
- List of NCAA Division I women's volleyball programs
