= Walsh Gymnasium =

Multi-purpose arena in South Orange, New Jersey

- New Jersey’s Most Historic Gymnasium
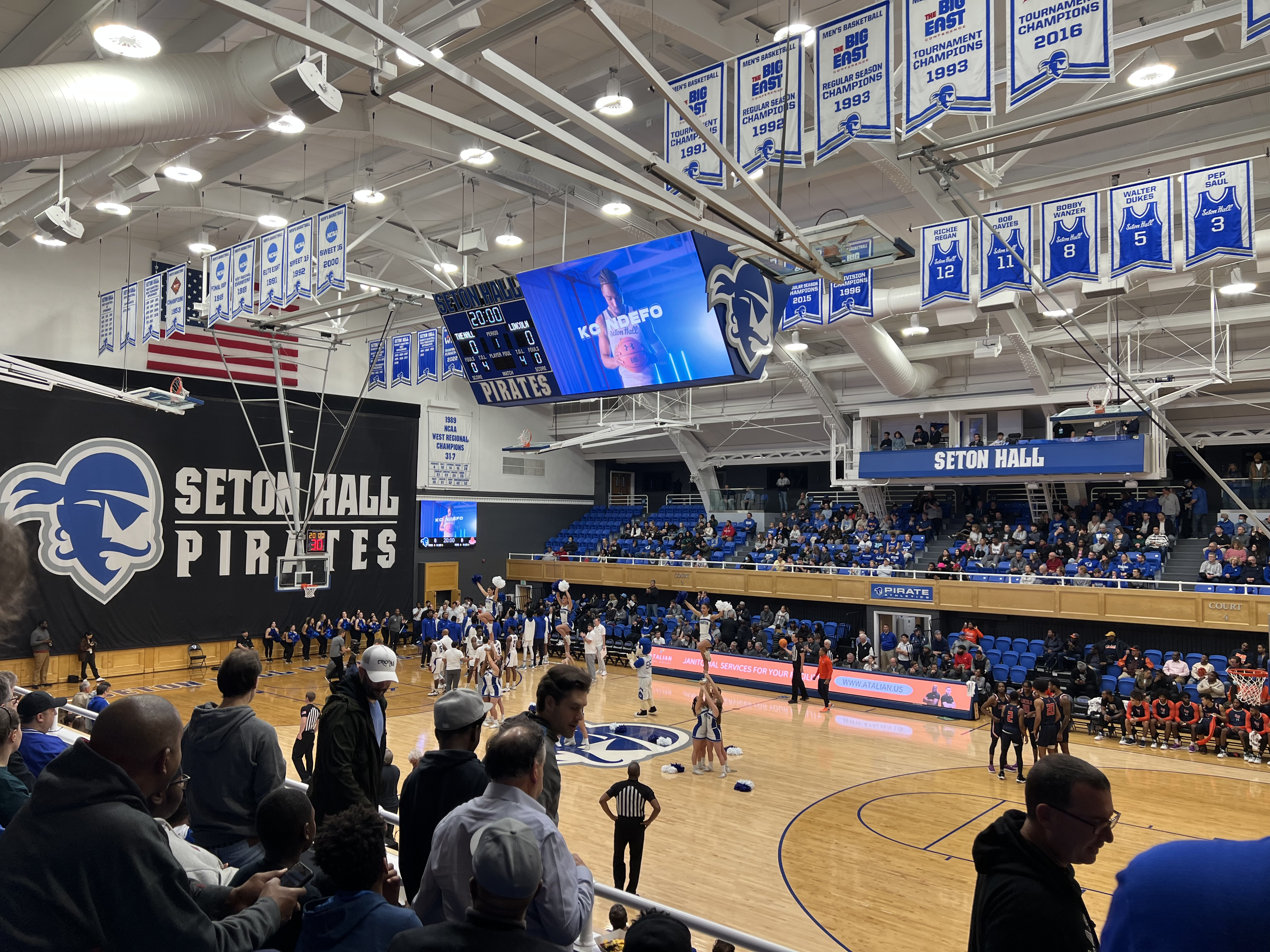
- Walsh Gymnasium during a basketball game in December 2022uhi
- Interactive map of Walsh Gymnasium
- Location: Seton Hall University; South Orange, NJ 07079
- Coordinates: 40.741690°N 74.244921°W
- Owner: Seton Hall University
- Operator: Seton Hall University
- Capacity: 1,316 (basketball); 1,100 (volleyball)
- Surface: Hardwood
- Public transit: South Orange station: NJ Transit Morristown Line Gladstone Branch: Weekdays Only NJT Bus: 92

Construction
- Groundbreaking: 1939
- Opened: 1941
- Renovated: 2020-2021
- Cost: $600,000 ($13.9 million in 2025 dollars)
- Architect: Anthony J. DePace

Tenants
- Seton Hall Pirates men's basketball (1941–1985; Occasional Non-Big East Games 1985-present); Seton Hall Pirates women's basketball (1973-present); Seton Hall Pirates women's volleyball

Walsh Gymnasium is a multi-purpose arena in South Orange, New Jersey on the campus of Seton Hall University. The arena opened in 1941 and can seat 1,316 people. It was home to the Seton Hall Pirates men's basketball team before they moved to the Meadowlands in 1985 and then Prudential Center in 2007. Currently, the arena hosts the women's basketball and volleyball teams, but continues to host men's basketball for preseason exhibitions, postseason invitational games such as early rounds of the NIT, and occasionally a regular season non-conference game if there is a conflict with Prudential Center's event schedule. The building is part of the Richie Regan Recreation & Athletic Center, and, like the school's main library, is named for Rev. Thomas J. Walsh, fifth bishop of Newark and former President of the Board of Trustees.

Walsh hosted a semifinal game of the ECAC Metro Region tournament, a National Collegiate Athletic Association (NCAA) Division I men's college basketball tournament organized by the Eastern College Athletic Conference (ECAC), in 1977. The Pirates played two games in the 2012 NIT and three games in the 2024 NIT in Walsh.

== History ==
Walsh Gymnasium was the first permanent basketball facility to be built on the Seton Hall campus. The architect was Anthony J. DePace. Construction began in 1939 as part of a project that would cost $600,000 (equivalent to $13.9 million in 2025) and was completed in the winter of 1941, when the men's basketball team played its first-ever game there. According to Alan Delozier in his book "Seton Hall Pirates: A Basketball History" Seton Hall University president Monsignor James F. Kelley based the Walsh Gymnasium concept on facilities found at St. Catherine's College and Yale University for their multipurpose dynamics.

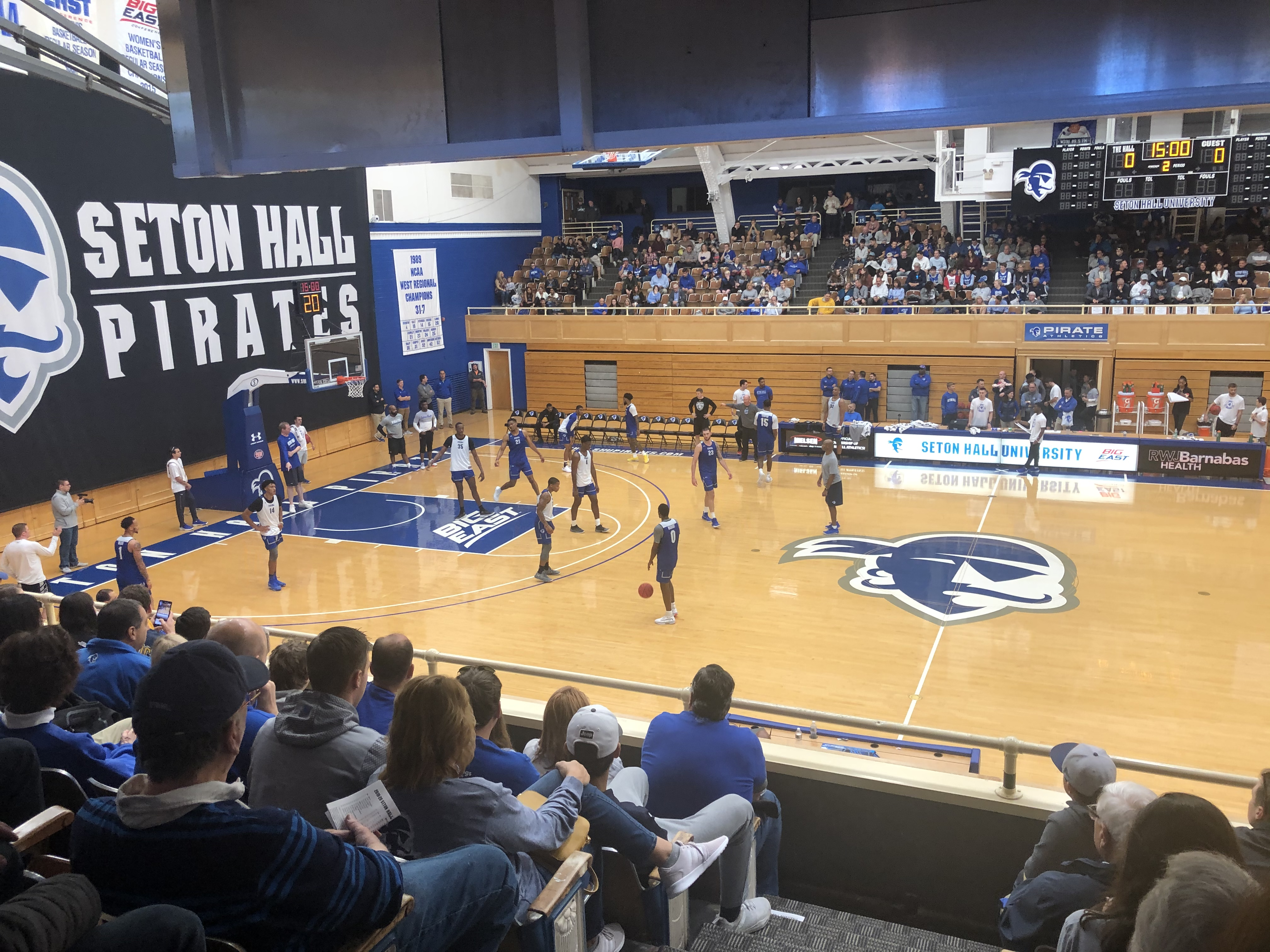
Walsh Gymnasium, October 2019 prior to 2021 renovations.

When it opened in 1941, Walsh seated 3,200 and was one of the largest arenas in the northeast. The last major renovation, during Tommy Amaker’s coaching tenure in the late 1990s, replaced nearly an entire bank of balcony seating with offices.

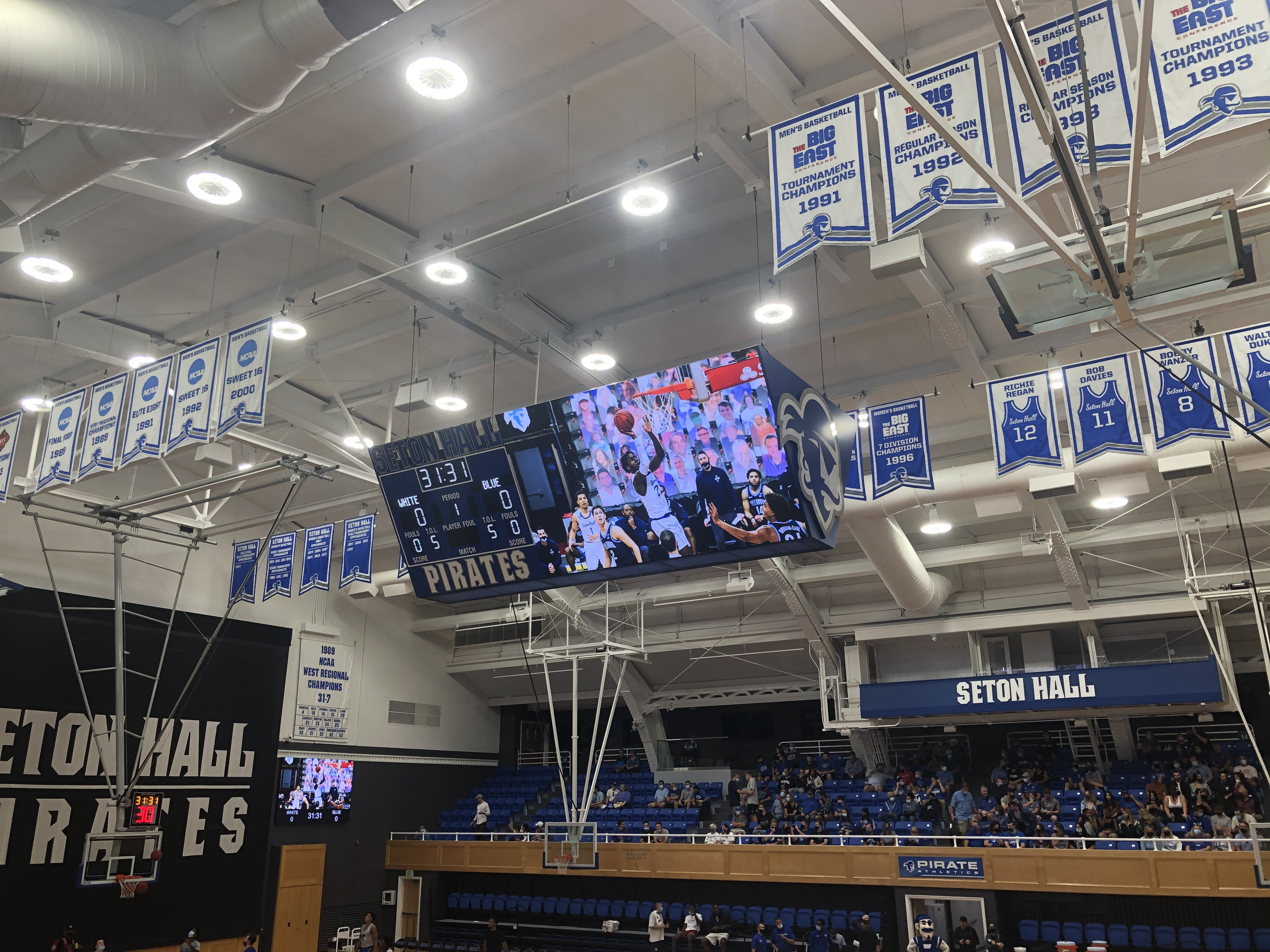
New Daktronics hanging scoreboard, October 2021

In 2020 Walsh Gymnasium received a significant facelift following the conclusion of the 2019-20 collegiate basketball season. Upgrades included: Complete replacement of the seating including the court level bleachers with chair-back seating; a new center-hung scoreboard, as well as two new video boards flanking the stage; new ceiling-mounted baskets which will replace the portable baskets; a new sound system; and a new hardwood court.

== Events ==
Over the years, Walsh Gym has been host to countless events including post-season games, religious ceremonies, graduations and concerts featuring the likes of him (Bruce Springsteen).

== See also ==
- List of NCAA Division I basketball arenas
