= UT Arlington Mavericks women's volleyball =

American college volleyball team

Texas–Arlington Mavericks
- University: University of Texas at Arlington
- Head coach: J.T. Wenger
- Conference: WAC
- Location: Arlington, Texas
- Home arena: College Park Center (capacity: 7,000)
- Nickname: Mavericks
- Colors: Royal blue, white, and orange

AIAW/NCAA tournament semifinal
- 1989

AIAW/NCAA tournament appearance
- 1973, 1974, 1975, 1976, 1978, 1979, 1980, 1981, 1985, 1986, 1987, 1988, 1989, 1990, 2001, 2002, 2024

Conference tournament champion
- 1982, 1985, 1986, 1987, 1988, 1989, 1990, 1992, 2001, 2002, 2024

Conference regular season champion
- 1982, 1983, 1984, 1985, 1986, 1987, 1988, 1989, 1990, 1992, 1998, 2002, 2024

The Texas–Arlington Mavericks volleyball team, historically one of the most nationally prominent teams on campus, is an NCAA Division I college volleyball team rejoined the Western Athletic Conference in July 2022. Home games are played at College Park Center, located on University of Texas at Arlington's campus in Arlington. The team has appeared in eight AIAW National Tournaments, nine NCAA Tournaments and three National Invitational Volleyball Championship Tournament, collecting 12 regular seasons titles and ten conference tournament titles along the way. The Mavericks ended the longest NCAA Tournament drought in program history by winning the 2024 WAC tournament. The previous appearance was in 2002.

== Team history ==
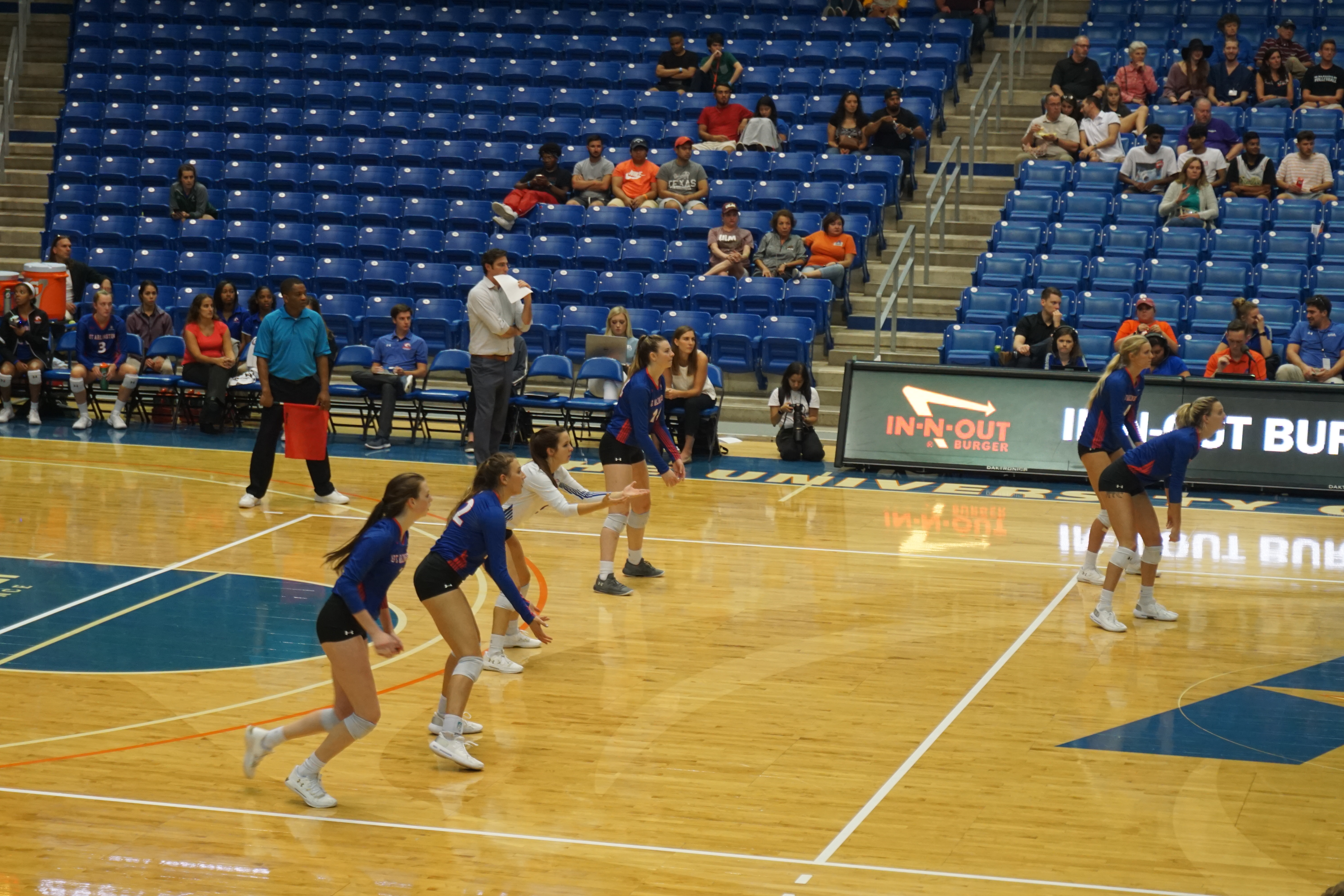
UT Arlington in action against Louisiana–Monroe

The Mavericks began competition in the Association for Intercollegiate Athletics for Women, as the NCAA didn't sponsor women's sports until the early 1980s. UTA's first coach was Jody Conradt who was also the head coach for the basketball and softball teams. Right away, the Mavericks were competitors, appearing in the AIAW National Tournament eight out of a possible nine times, finishing as high as sixth nationally in 1981. They placed in the national tournament every year but one.

When the NCAA began competition, the Mavericks moved over to the Southland Conference, where UTA was a founding member in 1963. The Mavericks immediately became the most dominant team in the conference winning the first nine regular season titles. UTA won the first conference tournament in 1982, but the NCAA structure didn't allow UTA to play in a postseason match. Second-seeded Lamar would win the conference tournament in 1983 and 1984 and again the Mavericks missed playing in the postseason. The Mavericks finally won the SLC tournament in 1985 under Head Coach Lisa Love and would also claim the next five after that. The Mavericks would establish themselves as national contenders as they made four Sweet Sixteen appearances, two Elite Eight's and a Final Four in 1989.

The Mavericks slipped in stature during the '90's after Coach Love took over the program at USC. They were no longer the perennial Southland Conference favorite, though they did win three regular season championships in the '90's and two tournament crowns.

Despite having long been removed from the Southland, the volleyball team still is first in regular season championships and three more tournament titles than second place Texas State.

UT Arlington would move from the Southland to the Western Athletic Conference in 2012, but would spend only one season in the WAC, moving from there to the Sun Belt Conference. After a later round of conference realignment in the early 2020s led to a major expansion of the Sun Belt's football side, UTA announced in January 2022 that it would return to the WAC that July.

In October 2015 against in-state Sun Belt rival Texas State, UTA's volleyball home attendance record at College Park Center was broken with 2,018 fans attending the match.

== Facilities ==
Until 2012, the Mavericks played at Texas Hall, which is a 3,300-seat theater on the campus. The teams played on the stage, and fans could watch the game from either the theater seats or the bleacher section.

A new arena called the College Park Center with a seating capacity of 7,000 opened for the 2012 season. The facility is located on the eastern side of the campus along with new housing, parking, and retail developments.

== Coaches ==
The Mavericks have had 7 coaches, listed below, in their 40+ year history. J.T. Wenger, a former volleyball player at UCLA and former assistant coach at UCLA, Michigan State, and Colorado, is the current head coach. Wenger is also the first male coach in program history.

- Jody Conradt – 1973–1975 (3 seasons)
- Mary Ridgway – 1976–1981 (6 seasons)
- Lisa Love – 1982–1988 (7 seasons)
- Cathy George – 1989–1993 (5 season)
- Janine Smith – 1994–2003 (10 seasons)
- Diane Seymour – 2004–2016 (13 seasons)
- J.T. Wenger – 2017–present

== Season-by-season results ==
Statistics overview
Season	Coach	Overall	Conference	Standing	Postseason
Jody Conradt (AIAW) (1973–1975)
1973	Conradt	27–9–3			T-9th AIAW National Tournament
1974	Conradt	44–6–3			7th AIAW National Tournament
1975	Conradt	34–14–2			AIAW National Tournament
Jody Conradt - career:		105–29–8 (.768)			
Mary Ridgeway (Independent) (1976–1981)
1976	Ridgway	45–15–1			9th AIAW National Tournament
1977	Ridgway	44–12			5th AIAW Regional Tournament
1978	Ridgway	50–10			9th AIAW National Tournament
1979	Ridgway	41–22			8th AIAW National Tournament
1980	Ridgway	46–15			11th AIAW National Tournament
1981	Ridgway	37–20			6th AIAW National Tournament
Mary Ridgway - career:		263–94–1 (.736)			
Lisa Love (Southland Conference) (1982–1988)
1982	Love	29–17	5–0	1st	
1983	Love	30–20	3–0	T-1st	
1984	Love	21–16	6–0	1st	
1985	Love	28–4	6–0	1st	NCAA Tournament
1986	Love	29–10	6–0	1st	NCAA Tournament Sweet Sixteen
1987	Love	32–7	7–0	1st	NCAA Tournament Sweet Sixteen
1988	Love	30–4	7–0	1st	NCAA Tournament Elite Eight
Lisa Love - career:		199–78 (.718)	40–0 (1.000)		
Cathy George (Southland Conference) (1989–1993)
1989	George	31–4	7–0	1st	NCAA Tournament Final Four
1990	George	18–19	7–0	1st	NCAA Tournament
1991	George	13–18	8–1	2nd	
1992	George	20–14	9–0	1st	3rd National Invitational Volleyball Championship Tournament
1993	George	11–19	6–3	T-4th	
Cathy George - career:		93–74 (.557)	37–4 (.902)		
Janine Smith (Southland Conference) (1994–2003)
1994	Smith	11–21	6–7	T-5th	
1995	Smith	15–20	9–9	5th	
1996	Smith	13–18	11–5	T-2nd	
1997	Smith	19–13	13–5	3rd	
1998	Smith	24–7	19–1	1st	
1999	Smith	16–15	12–8	T-4th	
2000	Smith	18–11	16–4	3rd	
2001	Smith	22–12	13–7	T-4th	NCAA Tournament
2002	Smith	26–7	18–2	1st	NCAA Tournament
2003	Smith	16–13	14–6	3rd	
Janine Smith - career:		180–137 (.568)	131–54 (.708)		
Diane Seymour (Southland Conference) (2004–2011)
2004	Seymour	24–7	15–5	3rd	
2005	Seymour	6–21	4–14	9th	
2006	Seymour	25–10	12–4	T-2nd	
2007	Seymour	19–11	12–4	3rd	
2008	Seymour	7–23	3–13	11th	
2009	Seymour	12–17	8–8	6th	
2010	Seymour	17–15	10–6	4th	
2011	Seymour	12–19	8–8	6th	
Diane Seymour - SLC:		122–123 (.498)	72–62 (.537)		
Diane Seymour (Western Athletic Conference) (2012–2013)
2012	Seymour	9–22	5–13	8th	
Diane Seymour - WAC:		9–22 (.290)	5–13 (.278)		
Diane Seymour (Sun Belt Conference) (2013–2016)
2013	Seymour	19–15	10–8	4th	
2014	Seymour	25–9	14–6	4th	
2015	Seymour	19–10	10–6	4th	
2016	Seymour	17–16	10–6	4th	
Diane Seymour - SBC:		80–50 (.615)	44–26 (.629)		
Diane Seymour - career:		211–195 (.520)	131–54 (.545)		
J.T. Wenger (Sun Belt Conference) (2017–2024)
2017	Wenger	13–17 (.433)	7–9 (.438)	7th	
2018	Wenger	16–12 (.571)	9–7 (.563)	5th	
2019	Wenger	20–14 (.588)	8–8 (.500)	3rd, West	
2020	Wenger	13–10 (.565)	10–6 (.625)	3rd, West	
2021	Wenger	12–15 (.444)	9–7 (.563)	T-2nd, West	
J.T. Wenger - SBC:		74–68 (.521)	43–37 (.538)		
J.T. Wenger (Western Athletic Conference) (2022–present)
2022	Wenger	17–10 (.630)	9–5 (.643)	5th	
2023	Wenger	21–11 (.656)	9–7 (.563)	4th	Super 16 National Invitational Volleyball Championship Tournament
2024	Wenger	29–3 (.906)	16–0 (1.000)	1st	NCAA Tournament
J.T. Wenger - WAC:		67–24 (.736)	34–12 (.739)		
J.T. Wenger - career:		141–92 (.605)	74–49 (.602)		
Total:		1147–652-9 (.637)			
National champion Postseason invitational champion Conference regular season champion Conference regular season and conference tournament champion Division regular season champion Division regular season and conference tournament champion Conference tournament champion

== See also ==
- List of NCAA Division I women's volleyball programs
