= Nicholls Colonels women's volleyball =

American college volleyball team

- University: Nicholls State University
- Head coach: Kallie Noble (1st season)
- Conference: Southland
- Location: Thibodaux, Louisiana
- Home arena: Stopher Gymnasium (capacity: 3,800)
- Nickname: Colonels
- Colors: Red and gray

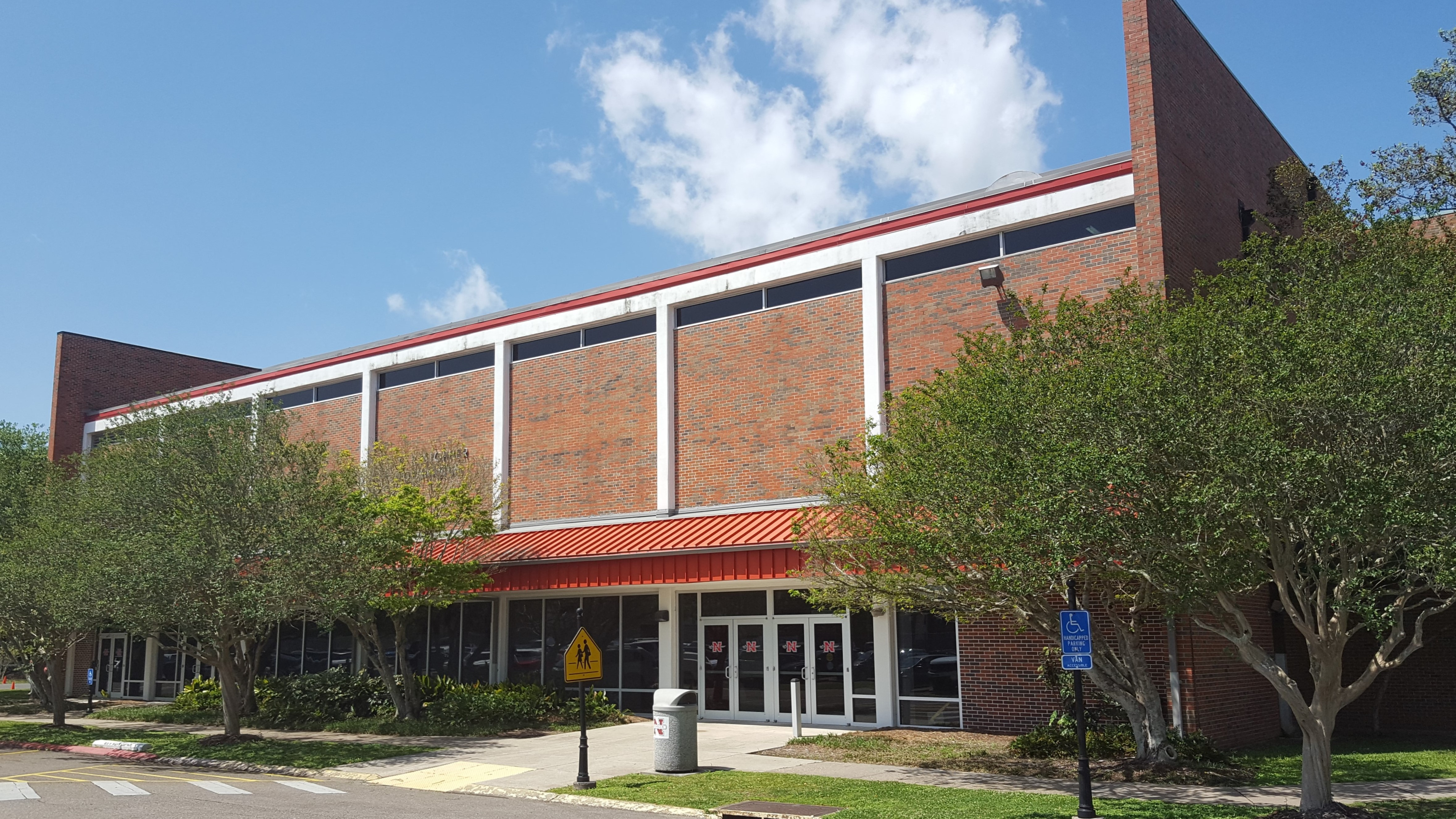
Stopher Gymnasium

The Nicholls Colonels women's volleyball team represents Nicholls State University in Thibodaux, Louisiana, United States. The school's team currently competes in the Southland Conference, which is part of the National Collegiate Athletic Association's Division I. Nicholls State's first volleyball team was fielded in 1975. The team plays its home games at 3,800-seat Stopher Gymnasium and are coached by Kallie Noble.

== See also ==
- Nicholls Colonels
- List of NCAA Division I women's volleyball programs
