= North Dakota Fighting Hawks women's volleyball =

American college volleyball team

- Founded: 1976
- University: University of North Dakota
- Head coach: David Nguyen (1st season)
- Conference: Summit; NCAA Division I Division
- Location: Grand Forks, North Dakota, US
- Home arena: Betty Engelstad Sioux Center (capacity: 3,300)
- Nickname: Fighting Hawks
- Colors: Kelly green and white

AIAW/NCAA tournament appearance
- 2016, 2017

The North Dakota Fighting Hawks volleyball team is a part of the athletic program at the University of North Dakota in Grand Forks, North Dakota, USA. They are members of the NCAA Division I Summit League. The program only includes a women's team. The current head coach is Jeremiah Tiffin.

== Head coaches ==
#	Name	Term
1	Polly West	1976
2	Cheryl Berg	1977
3	Carol Thompson	1978
4	Carol Cooke	1979–1985
5	Lisa Kissee	1986–1992
6	Nancy Clark	1993–1995
7	Lorie Stemen	1996–1997
8	Maria Breggeman	1998–2005
9	Katy Peterson	2006–2008
10	Kari Peterson*	2008–2009
11	Ashley Hardee	2009–2013
12	Mark Pryor	2014–2018
13	Jeremiah Tiffin	2019–2021
14	Jesse Tupac	2021–2025
15	David Nguyen	2026–present

(* – interim)

== Championships ==
North Dakota has won 2 Regular Season Championships and 5 Conference Tournament Championships

Great West Conference

- Conference Tournament Champions (3 times): 2009, 2010, 2011

Big Sky Conference

- Regular Season Champions (2 times): 2013, 2016
- Conference Tournament Champions (2 times): 2016, 2017

== Postseason ==
=== NCAA Division I postseason results ===
Year	Round	Opponent	Result
2016	First round	Minnesota	L 0-3
2017	First round	Minnesota	L 0-3

== Arenas ==
- Hyslop Sports Center 1976–2003
- Betty Engelstad Sioux Center 2004–present

== See also ==
- List of NCAA Division I women's volleyball programs
