= Cam Henderson Center =

Athletics complex in the United States

- "The Cam"
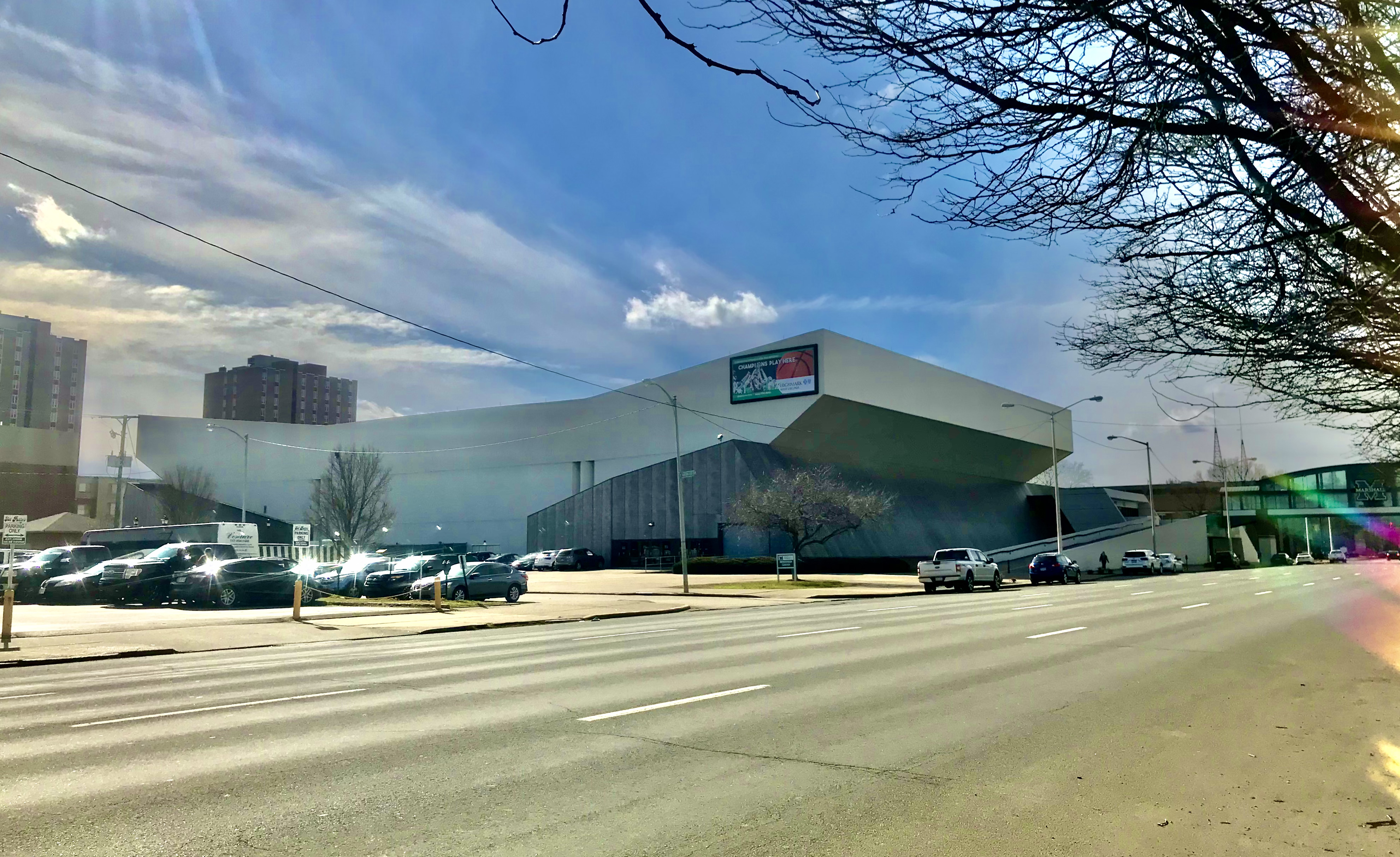
- Cam Henderson Center Exterior in 2021
- Interactive map of Cam Henderson Center
- Location: Third Ave (US Rte. 60); Huntington, WV 25755
- Coordinates: 38°25′28.2612″N 82°25′30.7596″W
- Owner: Marshall University
- Operator: Marshall University
- Capacity: 5,467
- Record attendance: 10,705

Construction
- Opened: November 27, 1981
- Renovated: 1998

Tenants
- Marshall Thundering Herd (NCAA); Men’s basketball (1981-present); Women’s basketball (1981-present); Women’s volleyball (1981-present)

The Cam Henderson Center is the primary indoor athletics complex at Marshall University in Huntington, West Virginia, United States of America. The basketball and volleyball teams of the Marshall Thundering Herd use the venue for their home games. The first basketball game played in the facility was a varsity match between Marshall and Army on November 27, 1981. The venue is named for Cam Henderson, who coached football and basketball at the school from 1935 to 1955.

== History ==
=== Design ===
The facility, as designed, was to be a "state of the art" arena seating 14,000. However, during construction, massive budget cuts were made and the finished product seated 10,250. The basketball arena currently seats 5,468 with the upper deck bleachers being tarped off due to safety concerns.

The arena was designed with a retractable lower seating section, which permitted use of the floor area for indoor track and general use by the physical education department. However this seating never worked as designed, and eventually, the school stopped retracting the seating for fear it would become stuck in that position. Also the poured concrete floor developed major cracks. The Henderson Center is 213,000 square feet (19,800 m^{2}).

=== Construction wrangles ===
Its construction was a part of a deal in the West Virginia Legislature to support the construction of Mountaineer Field at West Virginia University. Legislators affiliated with Marshall had opposed building such a facility unless Marshall also received an athletic facility. At the time, Marshall's home court was the Veterans Memorial Fieldhouse, a 30-year-old county-owned facility located 6 blocks from campus and seating only 6,500. The Center was opened in 1981, despite construction of the facility not finishing until the next year.

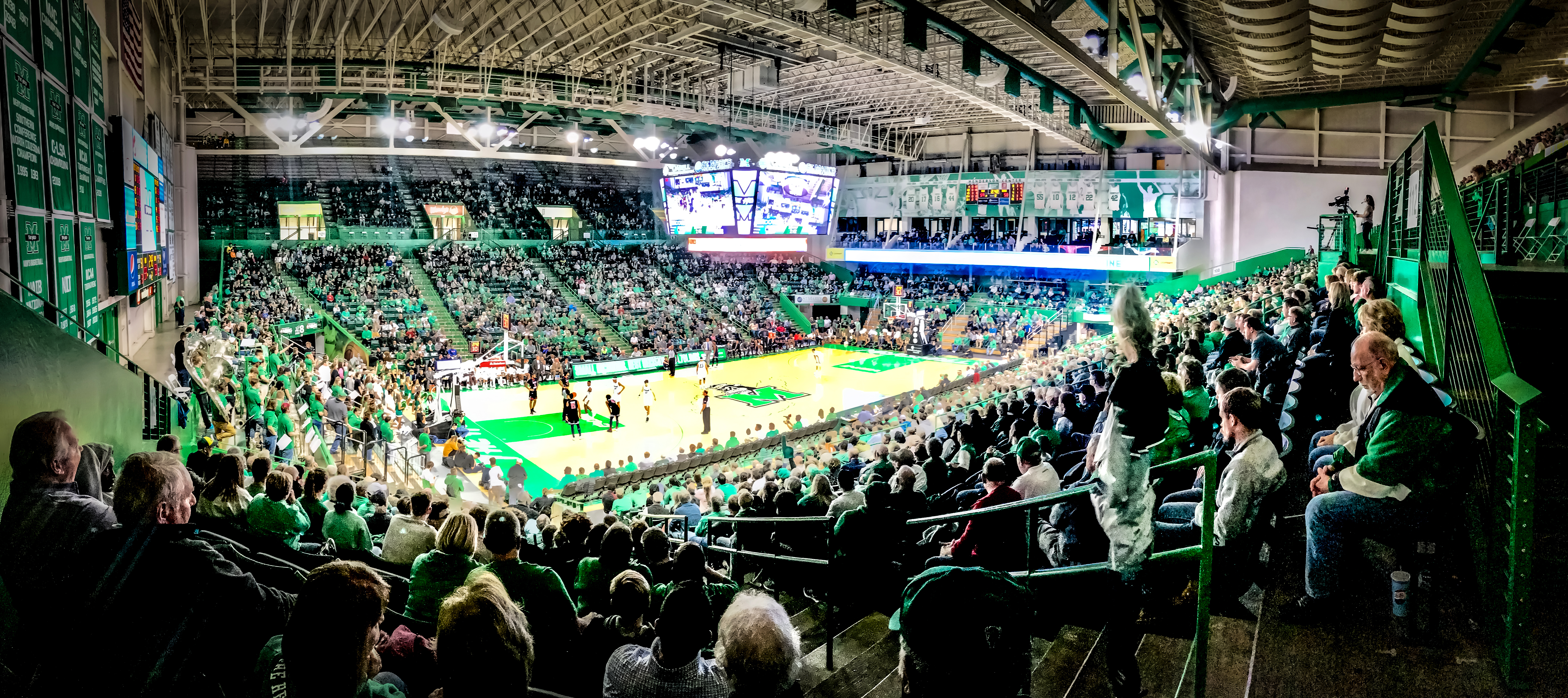
Inside of Cam Henderson Center in 2019

In 1996 the school, using settlement proceeds from a lawsuit against the seat manufacturer and a new state appropriation, replaced the lower section with a permanent seating section and repaired the floor, mostly ending the arena's use for anything except basketball and volleyball, except a small annual charity tennis tournament. This reduced the seating capacity to its current level. With the decline in the men's basketball program, many years passed since the final reconfiguration of the facility without a capacity crowd seen in Henderson Center. On February 11, 2006, the Center was finally filled when the men's basketball team faced number 3-ranked University of Memphis. The women's basketball program has held "Jam The Cam" events resulting in attendance records for women's basketball in the Mid-American Conference (Marshall has since become a member of Conference USA and most recently the Sun Belt Conference and an occasional copycat event with one of the other lower-profile sports at Marshall, such as volleyball or swimming/diving.

The building was merged into the existing Gullickson Hall and contains athletic department offices and a competitive pool for swimming in addition to the arena.

In 2011, the University proposed a deal with the local park board to take over and remove the Veterans Memorial Fieldhouse, which would be the site of a new soccer facility. The remaining basketball events at the fieldhouse, which are games of the city's two private high schools and regional rounds of the state basketball tournament, would move to the Henderson Center.

== Events ==
The West Virginia Secondary School Activities Commission state cheerleading championships were held at Cam Henderson Center in 2019, 2021 (spring & fall), 2022 and 2023.

== See also ==
- List of NCAA Division I basketball arenas
