= Seton Hall Pirates women's volleyball =

- University: Seton Hall University
- Conference: Big East Conference
- NCAA: Division I
- Athletic director: Patrick Lyons
- Location: South Orange, New Jersey
- Arena: Walsh Gymnasium
- Mascot: The Pirate
- Colors: Blue and white

The Seton Hall Pirates women's volleyball program is the NCAA Division I intercollegiate volleyball program of Seton Hall University in South Orange, New Jersey. The team competes in the Big East Conference and plays their home games in Walsh Gymnasium on the Seton Hall campus.

== 2014 season ==
=== Regular season ===
The Seton Hall Women's Volleyball Team finished 2nd in regular season conference play behind Creighton University.

=== Post-season ===
==== Big East Championship ====
At the Big East Championship tournament, Seton Hall beat Marquette University (3-2) in the first round and went on to play Creighton for the title, where the team fell short of winning the Big East Championship (3-1).

==== NCAA tournament ====
The team went on to earn their first ever NCAA tournament berth in program history. Seton Hall faced off against 12th ranked Brigham Young University in the first round of the NCAA tournament, falling to the Cougars (3-0) in Tucson, Arizona.

== Awards ==
=== Big East Libero of the year ===
2012 - Alyssa Warren

2013 - Alyssa Warren

2014 - Tessa Fournier

=== Big East scholar athlete of the year ===
2014 - Shelbey Manthorpe

=== Big East coaching staff of the year ===
2014 - Head Coach: Allison Yaeger, Assistant Coach: Alexandra Matters

=== First Team All-Big East ===
2012 - Shelbey Manthorpe

2013 - Alyssa Warren

2014 - Tessa Fournier, Shelbey Manthorpe, Stacey Manthorpe

=== Second Team All-Big East ===
2012 - Stacey Manthorpe, Alyssa Warren

2013 - Shelbey Manthorpe, Stacey Manthorpe

2014 - Amanda Hansen

== See also ==
- List of NCAA Division I women's volleyball programs
