= UMBC Retrievers women's volleyball =

American college volleyball team

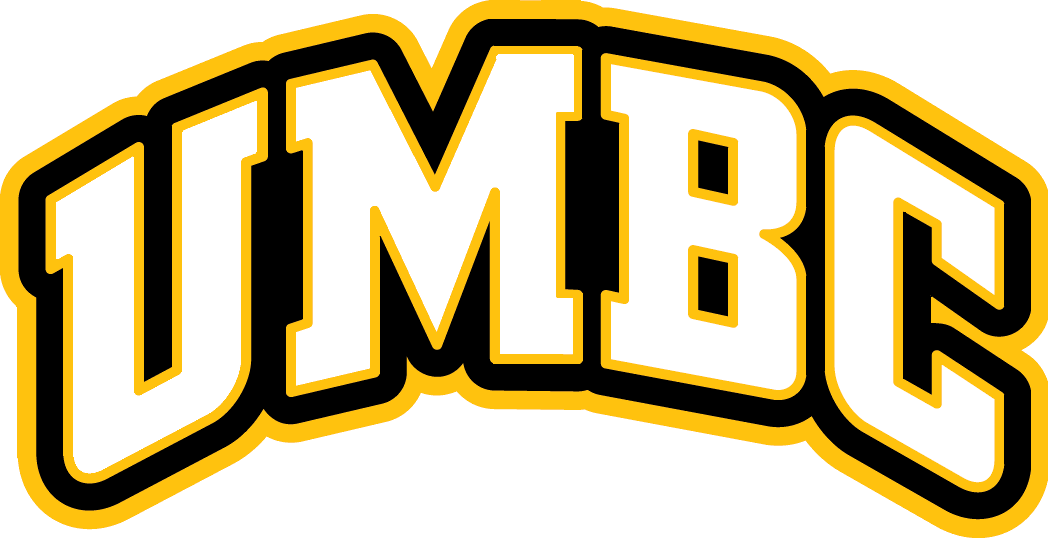
- University: University of Maryland, Baltimore County
- Head coach: Kasey Crider (5th season)
- Conference: America East
- Location: Catonsville, Maryland
- Home arena: UMBC Event Center (capacity: 5,000)
- Nickname: Retrievers
- Colors: Black and gold

AIAW/NCAA tournament appearance
- 2020, 2021, 2022, 2023

Conference tournament champion
- 2020, 2021, 2022, 2023

Conference regular season champion
- 2020, 2021, 2023

The UMBC Retrievers women's volleyball is the program that represents the University of Maryland, Baltimore County in NCAA Division I women's volleyball.

== History ==
The team began play in 1973. On February 19, 2018, UMBC hired former Duke Blue Devils assistant coach Cristina Robertson as the sixth head coach in the program's 45-year history. During the last two years of her tenure, in the 2020 and 2021 seasons (the former rescheduled to spring 2021 due to the Covid-19 pandemic), the team began a very successful run, winning the America East Conference tournament four years in a row. Amidst this success, Cristina Robertson left to accept the head coaching position at Florida International University. Kasey Crider was hired as head coach in February 2022, with the team continuing its success during his first two years at the job.

== See also ==
- List of NCAA Division I women's volleyball programs
