= North Alabama Lions women's volleyball =

American college volleyball team

- Head coach: Tristan Johnson (5th season)
- Conference: UAC
- Location: Florence, Alabama, US
- Home arena: CB&S Bank Arena (capacity: 3,000)
- Colors: Purple and gold

AIAW/NCAA tournament champion
- Division II; 2003

AIAW/NCAA tournament semifinal
- Division II; 2000, 2003, 2006

AIAW/NCAA tournament appearance
- Division II; 1996, 1997, 1998, 1999, 2000, 2001, 2002, 2003, 2004, 2005, 2006, 2009, 2010, 2011, 2015, 2016, 2017

Conference tournament champion
- Gulf South; 1975, 1982, 1983, 1984, 1985, 1986, 1987, 1988, 1996, 1997, 1998, 1999, 2000, 2001, 2002, 2003, 2004, 2005, 2006, 2015, 2016

The University of North Alabama women's volleyball program is one of the most successful collegiate athletic programs in the United States, holding numerous conference and regional titles and one Division II national championship, earned in 2003.

== History ==
Despite its reputation as one of the nation's premiere women's athletic program, the UNA volleyball program claims humble beginnings. It began in 1969 as an extramural program of the Physical Education Department of what was then known as Florence State University. During this period, the team competed against all state schools as a member of the Association for Intercollegiate Athletics for Women. The team competed in the Northern District against Jacksonville State, Alabama A&M, Montevallo, Southern Benedictine and Stillman.

Coached by Physical Education instructor Don McBrayer, the Lady Lions posted numerous successes, including a state championship win over the University of Alabama in 1975. The Lady Lions also defeated Troy State, Auburn and Montevallo before prevailing over Alabama.

Another milestone in the program was crossed in 1976, when Lillian Goodlow, a premiere basketball and volleyball player at Bradshaw High School in Florence, became the first female athlete in UNA history to be awarded an athletic scholarship.

=== First Conference Title in 1982 ===
Yet another major step was taken in 1982, when the Gulf South Conference first began awarding championships in women's sports. UNA's volleyball team earned the first official lead title for women with a 3-0 win over Jacksonville State.

The Lady Lions went on to win six of the first seven GSC volleyball championships.

In 1995, Matt Peck was hired as head coach. Over the following decade, Peck led the Lions to eight NCAA appearances, four trips to the Elite Eight, two Final Fours and the 2003 Division II National Championship.

In 1996, the Lions amassed a 44-4 record that included UNA's seventh GSC championship and the first ever NCAA Tournament appearance by an Alabama team. In 1997, UNA claimed its second GSC Tournament title and earned its second NCAA Regional bid.

UNA became the first GSC institution to advance to the NCAA Division II Elite Eight in 1998. Moreover, the Lions earned their third straight GSC title and first-ever NCAA regional championship. UNA player also became the first volleyball player in GSC history to be selected a first-team All-American.

In 1999, with a 35-7 record, UNA won its fourth straight GSC title and completed its fourth straight NCAA appearance, advancing to the Elite Eight for the second time.

UNA won its fifth straight GSC title, completed a fifth straight NCAA trip and ascended to the Division II Final Four for the first time. Team members Ashley Moffitt and Nesrin Secklin also earned All-American Honors in 2000 and 2001.

The following year, UNA made GSC history, winning its seventh straight conference title and 13th overall volleyball crown.

=== First National Title for a UNA Women's Team ===
However, 2003 was a year marked with irony. While the team failed to win a GSC title for the first time in eight years, it excelled in the NCAA South Central Regional, Elite Eight and Final Four to secure the first national championship ever claimed by a UNA women's athletic team.

The team regained its GSC title in 2004.

In 2006, the Lions lacked only one victory winning the national championship, falling to top-ranked Tampa in the finals of the NCAA Tournament in Pensacola, Florida.
