= 2026 Louisville Cardinals women's volleyball team =

American college volleyball season

2026 Louisville Cardinals women's volleyball
- Conference: Atlantic Coast Conference
- Record: 22–2 (12–0 ACC)
- Head coach: Dan Meske (2nd season)
- Assistant coaches: Todd Chamberlain; Parker Mikesch; Jena Otec
- Home arena: L&N Federal Credit Union Arena

2026 ACC women's volleyball standings
	Conf.				Overall
Team	W		L	PCT	W		L	PCT
No. 3 Louisville ‍‍‍	13	–	0	1.000	23	–	2	.920
No. 2 Pittsburgh ‍‍‍	12	–	1	.923	22	–	1	.957
No. 5 SMU ‍‍‍	11	–	2	.846	19	–	4	.826
No. 20 North Carolina ‍‍‍	11	–	2	.846	16	–	5	.762
Miami (FL) ‍‍‍	10	–	3	.769	12	–	10	.545
Duke ‍‍‍	8	–	5	.615	16	–	7	.696
California ‍‍‍	7	–	6	.538	17	–	7	.708
No. 23 Stanford ‍‍‍	7	–	6	.538	14	–	9	.609
Florida State ‍‍‍	7	–	6	.538	13	–	11	.542
Georgia Tech ‍‍‍	6	–	7	.462	14	–	10	.583
NC State ‍‍‍	5	–	8	.385	14	–	10	.583
Virginia Tech ‍‍‍	5	–	8	.385	8	–	14	.364
Boston College ‍‍‍	4	–	9	.308	13	–	11	.542
Wake Forest ‍‍‍	3	–	10	.231	9	–	15	.375
Clemson ‍‍‍	3	–	10	.231	9	–	16	.360
Virginia ‍‍‍	2	–	11	.154	6	–	16	.273
Notre Dame ‍‍‍	2	–	11	.154	5	–	17	.227
Syracuse ‍‍‍	1	–	12	.077	6	–	16	.273
† – Conference champion + – At-large invitation to the 2026 NCAA tournament As of November 7, 2026; Rankings from AVCA Coaches Poll; Source:The ACC

The 2026 Louisville Cardinals women's volleyball team represents the University of Louisville in the 2026 NCAA Division I women's volleyball season. The Cardinals are led by second-year head coach Dan Meske and play their home matches at L&N Federal Credit Union Arena in Louisville, Kentucky, with select matches at the KFC Yum! Center. They are members of the Atlantic Coast Conference.

Louisville began the season ranked seventh in the AVCA preseason poll and was picked to finish third in the ACC preseason coaches' poll. The Cardinals opened the season at the AVCA First Serve in Milwaukee, defeating eighth-ranked Texas A&M, the defending national champion, before being swept by sixth-ranked Wisconsin. Louisville then won nine straight matches, including sweeps of eighteenth-ranked TCU and ninth-ranked Texas at Bridgestone Arena in Nashville, and rose to third in the AVCA poll on September 14. The win streak ended with a four-set loss at fourth-ranked Kentucky on September 20.

The Cardinals won their first twelve ACC matches, including a sweep of fourteenth-ranked Stanford, the preseason conference favorite. They entered November 22–2 overall and 12–0 in conference play, on a twelve-match winning streak.

== Previous season ==
In Meske's first season as head coach, the Cardinals finished 26–7 overall and 16–4 in ACC play. They hosted the first and second rounds of the NCAA tournament, sweeping Loyola Chicago and defeating Marquette in five sets, before losing to Texas A&M in five sets in the regional semifinals in Lincoln, Nebraska.

== Offseason ==
=== Departures ===
Name	Number	Pos.	Height	Year	Hometown	Reason for departure
Ava Utterback	1	OH	5'10"	(redshirt) Freshman	Plainfield, IN	Transferred to UCLA
Molly Wilson	10	S	5'11"	Senior	Murrieta, CA	Graduated
Cara Cresse	13	MB	6'6"	(redshirt) Senior	Fort Wayne, IN	Drafted 5th overall by the Indy Ignite in the 2025 Major League Volleyball Draft
Alanna Bankston	18	OH	6'1"	Junior	Omaha, NE	Transferred to Michigan State
Reese Robins	25	OPP	6'5"	Junior	Mansfield, TX	Transferred to TCU

=== Incoming transfers ===
Name	Pos.	Height	Year	Hometown	Previous Team	Source
Brooke Bultema	MB	6'3"	Senior	Cincinnati, OH	Kentucky	

=== Incoming recruits ===
2026 Louisville Recruits
Name	Pos.	Height	Hometown	High School / Club
Amirra Bailey	MB/OPP	6'5"	Bowling Green, KY	Bowling Green
Jordyn Gray	OH	6'1"	Charlotte, NC	Cox Mill
Elsi Karjanlahti	L/DS	5'8"	Seinäjoki, Finland	Sampo Central
Elli Strecker	MB	6'4"	Zionsville, IN	Zionsville Community
Blair Thiebaud	S	6'0"	College Station, TX	College Station

== Roster ==
2026 Louisville Cardinals Roster
Libero/Defensive Specialists: 3 Kamden Schrand – Senior; 10 Elsi Karjanlahti – Freshman; 12 Jessica Drapp – Senior; 17 Molly Urban – Senior; Setters: 6 Hannah Kenny – Sophomore; 8 Nayelis Cabello – Junior; 22 Blair Thiebaud – Freshman	Middle Blockers: 4 Addison Makun – Sophomore; 5 Amirra Bailey – Freshman; 11 Hannah Sherman – Graduate; 44 Brooke Bultema – Senior; 54 Elli Strecker – Freshman	Outside/Opposite Hitters: 2 Chloe Meester – (redshirt) Freshman; 7 Chloe Chicoine – Senior; 9 Jordyn Gray – Freshman; 21 Payton Petersen – Junior; 24 Kalyssa Blackshear – Sophomore

=== Coaches ===
2026 Louisville Cardinals Coaching Staff
- Dan Meske – head coach – 2nd year
- Todd Chamberlain – associate head coach
- Parker Mikesch – assistant coach
- Jena Otec – assistant coach
- Sarah Drury Petkovic – chief of staff

=== Support staff ===
2026 Louisville Cardinals Support Staff
- Kelsey Penebaker – director of sports medicine
- Liz Dupree – performance coach

== Schedule ==
Date time, TV	Rank^{#}	Opponent^{#}	Result	Record	Site (attendance) city, state
Non-conference regular season
August 21*; 6:00 pm, ESPN2	No. 7	vs. No. 8 Texas A&M; AVCA First Serve	W 3–1 (25–20, 25–23, 20–25, 25–21)	1–0	Fiserv Forum (6,345); Milwaukee, WI
August 22*; 4:00 pm, Fox	No. 7	vs. No. 6 Wisconsin; AVCA First Serve	L 0–3 (18–25, 20–25, 18–25)	1–1	Fiserv Forum (7,618); Milwaukee, WI
August 28*; 7:00 pm, ACCNX	No. 7	No. 16 Indiana	W 3–0 (25–20, 25–12, 25–11)	2–1	L&N Federal Credit Union Arena (1,074); Louisville, KY
August 31*; 6:00 pm, ACCNX	No. 6	Dayton	W 3–0 (25–14, 25–14, 25–11)	3–1	L&N Federal Credit Union Arena (1,055); Louisville, KY
September 4*; 4:00 pm, ACCN	No. 6	No. 18 TCU	W 3–0 (25–23, 25–14, 27–25)	4–1	L&N Federal Credit Union Arena (1,074); Louisville, KY
September 6*; 12:00 pm, ABC	No. 6	vs. No. 9 Texas; Broadway Block Party	W 3–0 (25–12, 28–26, 25–16)	5–1	Bridgestone Arena; Nashville, TN
September 9*; 7:00 pm, ACCN	No. 5	Missouri; Showdown at the Net	W 3–1 (25–21, 22–25, 25–15, 25–17)	6–1	KFC Yum! Center (5,076); Louisville, KY
September 11*; 7:00 pm, ESPN+	No. 5	at Rice; Rice Invitational	W 3–1 (25–14, 25–17, 24–26, 25–12)	7–1	Tudor Fieldhouse (927); Houston, TX
September 12*; 2:00 pm, ESPN+	No. 5	vs. No. 15 Creighton; Rice Invitational	W 3–1 (25–22, 27–25, 23–25, 25–16)	8–1	Tudor Fieldhouse (557); Houston, TX
September 13*; 1:00 pm, ESPN+	No. 5	vs. Northern Iowa; Rice Invitational	W 3–0 (25–11, 25–17, 25–23)	9–1	Tudor Fieldhouse (529); Houston, TX
September 16*; 7:00 pm, ESPN+	No. 3	at Western Kentucky	W 3–0 (25–15, 25–19, 25–19)	10–1	E. A. Diddle Arena (2,681); Bowling Green, KY
September 20*; 3:00 pm, ABC	No. 3	at No. 4 Kentucky; Battle of the Bluegrass	L 1–3 (25–19, 27–29, 21–25, 19–25)	10–2	Memorial Coliseum (6,045); Lexington, KY
ACC regular season
September 25; 6:00 pm, ACCNX	No. 4	at Syracuse	W 3–0 (25–9, 25–13, 25–18)	11–2 (1–0)	Women's Building (201); Syracuse, NY
September 27; 1:00 pm, ACCNX	No. 4	at Boston College	W 3–0 (25–19, 25–21, 25–14)	12–2 (2–0)	Connell Recreation Center (832); Chestnut Hill, MA
September 30; 7:00 pm, ACCNX	No. 4	Notre Dame	W 3–0 (25–16, 25–18, 25–18)	13–2 (3–0)	L&N Federal Credit Union Arena (1,072); Louisville, KY
October 3; 1:00 pm, ACCNX	No. 4	at Notre Dame	W 3–0 (25–15, 25–12, 25–17)	14–2 (4–0)	Purcell Pavilion (944); Notre Dame, IN
October 8; 7:00 pm, ACCNX	No. 3	California	W 3–1 (25–17, 25–17, 23–25, 25–18)	15–2 (5–0)	L&N Federal Credit Union Arena (1,045); Louisville, KY
October 11; 1:00 pm, ESPN	No. 3	No. 14 Stanford	W 3–0 (25–23, 25–18, 25–17)	16–2 (6–0)	L&N Federal Credit Union Arena (1,050); Louisville, KY
October 16; 7:00 pm, ACCNX	No. 3	Duke	W 3–0 (25–19, 25–11, 25–15)	17–2 (7–0)	L&N Federal Credit Union Arena (1,074); Louisville, KY
October 18; 1:00 pm, ACCNX	No. 3	No. 23 North Carolina	W 3–0 (29–27, 25–22, 25–23)	18–2 (8–0)	L&N Federal Credit Union Arena (1,054); Louisville, KY
October 23; 6:00 pm, ACCNX	No. 3	at Florida State	W 3–0 (25–21, 25–13, 25–15)	19–2 (9–0)	Tully Gymnasium (725); Tallahassee, FL
October 25; 3:30 pm, ACCN	No. 3	at Miami (FL)	W 3–1 (25–18, 25–15, 21–25, 25–12)	20–2 (10–0)	Knight Sports Complex (1,157); Coral Gables, FL
October 30; 7:00 pm, ACCNX	No. 3	Clemson	W 3–0 (25–10, 25–13, 28–26)	21–2 (11–0)	L&N Federal Credit Union Arena (1,043); Louisville, KY
November 1; 12:00 pm, ACCN	No. 3	Georgia Tech	W 3–0 (25–19, 25–21, 27–25)	22–2 (12–0)	KFC Yum! Center (6,873); Louisville, KY
November 6; 7:00 pm, ACCNX	No. 3	at Virginia			Memorial Gymnasium; Charlottesville, VA
November 8; 1:00 pm, ACCNX	No. 3	at Virginia Tech			Cassell Coliseum; Blacksburg, VA
November 12; 8:00 pm, ESPNU		at SMU			Moody Coliseum; Dallas, TX
November 15; 8:00 pm, ESPN		at Pittsburgh			Victory Heights Arena; Pittsburgh, PA
November 20; 7:00 pm, ACCNX		Wake Forest			L&N Federal Credit Union Arena; Louisville, KY
November 22; 1:00 pm, ACCN		NC State			L&N Federal Credit Union Arena; Louisville, KY
November 25; 4:00 pm, ACCN		at North Carolina			Carmichael Arena; Chapel Hill, NC
November 28; 1:00 pm, ACCNX		SMU			KFC Yum! Center; Louisville, KY
*Non-conference match. ^{#}Rankings from AVCA Coaches Poll at the time of the match. All times are in Eastern Time. Source:

== Awards and honors ==
Recipient	Award	Date	Ref.
Kalyssa Blackshear	Preseason All-ACC Team	July 30	
Nayelis Cabello	Preseason All-ACC Team	July 30	
Chloe Chicoine	Preseason All-ACC Team	July 30	
Payton Petersen	Preseason All-ACC Team	July 30	
Chloe Meester	ACC Offensive Player of the Week	September 7	
Nayelis Cabello	ACC Co-Setter of the Week	September 7	
Chloe Meester	AVCA National Player of the Week	September 8	
Nayelis Cabello	ACC Setter of the Week	September 14	
Addison Makun	ACC Defensive Player of the Week	September 28	
Payton Petersen	AVCA National Player of the Year Watch List	October 8	
Chloe Chicoine	ACC Offensive Player of the Week	October 19	
Nayelis Cabello	ACC Setter of the Week	November 2	

== Rankings ==
Ranking movements Legend: ██ Increase in ranking ██ Decrease in ranking
	Week															
Poll	Pre	1	2	3	4	5	6	7	8	9	10	11	12	13	14	Final
AVCA	7	6	5	3	4	4	3	3	3	3	3					
