= 2026 SMU Mustangs women's volleyball team =

American college volleyball season

2026 SMU Mustangs women's volleyball
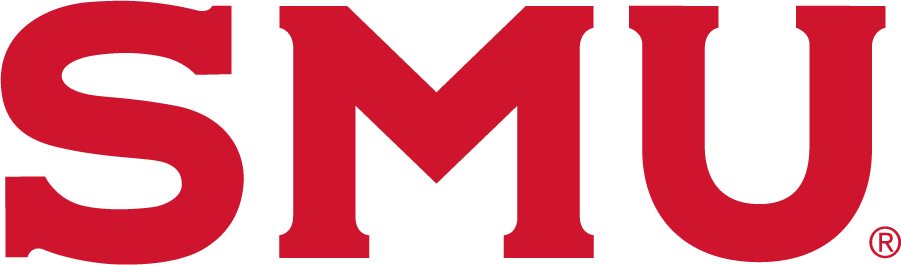
- Conference: Atlantic Coast Conference
- Record: 21–4 (13–2 ACC)
- Head coach: Sam Erger (5th season)
- Assistant coaches: Trent Sorensen; Diego Aguilar; Clayton Bristow
- Home arena: Moody Coliseum

2026 ACC women's volleyball standings
	Conf.				Overall
Team	W		L	PCT	W		L	PCT
No. 3 Louisville ‍‍‍	13	–	0	1.000	23	–	2	.920
No. 2 Pittsburgh ‍‍‍	12	–	1	.923	22	–	1	.957
No. 5 SMU ‍‍‍	11	–	2	.846	19	–	4	.826
No. 20 North Carolina ‍‍‍	11	–	2	.846	16	–	5	.762
Miami (FL) ‍‍‍	10	–	3	.769	12	–	10	.545
Duke ‍‍‍	8	–	5	.615	16	–	7	.696
California ‍‍‍	7	–	6	.538	17	–	7	.708
No. 23 Stanford ‍‍‍	7	–	6	.538	14	–	9	.609
Florida State ‍‍‍	7	–	6	.538	13	–	11	.542
Georgia Tech ‍‍‍	6	–	7	.462	14	–	10	.583
NC State ‍‍‍	5	–	8	.385	14	–	10	.583
Virginia Tech ‍‍‍	5	–	8	.385	8	–	14	.364
Boston College ‍‍‍	4	–	9	.308	13	–	11	.542
Wake Forest ‍‍‍	3	–	10	.231	9	–	15	.375
Clemson ‍‍‍	3	–	10	.231	9	–	16	.360
Virginia ‍‍‍	2	–	11	.154	6	–	16	.273
Notre Dame ‍‍‍	2	–	11	.154	5	–	17	.227
Syracuse ‍‍‍	1	–	12	.077	6	–	16	.273
† – Conference champion + – At-large invitation to the 2026 NCAA tournament As of November 7, 2026; Rankings from AVCA Coaches Poll; Source:The ACC

The 2026 SMU Mustangs women's volleyball team represents Southern Methodist University in the 2026 NCAA Division I women's volleyball season. The Mustangs are led by fifth-year head coach Sam Erger and play their home matches at Moody Coliseum in Dallas, Texas. It is the team's third season as a member of the Atlantic Coast Conference.

The Mustangs began the season ranked eleventh in the AVCA preseason poll and were picked to finish fourth in the ACC preseason coaches' poll. SMU opened the season by sweeping eighth-ranked Texas A&M at the AVCA First Serve in Milwaukee. The Mustangs then played in Spikes Under the Lights, an exhibition showcase held at AT&T Stadium in Arlington, Texas, where they defeated tenth-ranked Penn State before losing to top-ranked Nebraska in the final. In September, SMU defeated ninth-ranked Texas in five sets for just the second time in program history and third-ranked Kentucky at the Paradise Invitational in the Bahamas. Following those wins, the Mustangs rose to fifth in the AVCA poll on September 14, the highest ranking in program history.

SMU opened ACC play with a sweep of twelfth-ranked Stanford and won its first five conference matches. On October 7, the Mustangs defeated second-ranked Pittsburgh in four sets on the road, handing the Panthers their first loss of the season and ending their nation-leading 58-match home winning streak. Pittsburgh won the rematch at Moody Coliseum four days later, and SMU lost in five sets to Miami (FL) the following week. The Mustangs then won five straight conference matches and entered November 18–4 overall and 10–2 in ACC play.

== Previous season ==
The Mustangs finished the 2025 season 27–6 overall and 17–3 in ACC play to finish in third place, tying the program record for wins in a season. They earned a No. 2 seed in the NCAA tournament, where they swept Central Arkansas and Florida to reach the regional semifinals for the first time in program history. They lost to Purdue 3–1 to end their season. Four Mustangs were named AVCA All-Americans, including Malaya Jones, the program's first First Team All-American.

== Offseason ==
=== Outgoing departures ===
Name	Number	Pos.	Height	Year	Hometown	Reason for departure
Malaya Jones	1	OPP	6'0"	Graduate	El Dorado Hills, CA	Drafted 9th overall by the Dallas Pulse in the 2025 Major League Volleyball Draft
Casey Batenhorst	5	S	6'1"	Senior	Houston, TX	Graduated
Amelia Hansen	7	OH	6'0"	Freshman	Monument, CO	—
Averi Carlson	9	S	5'11"	Senior	Lucas, TX	Drafted 7th overall by the Atlanta Vibe in the 2025 Major League Volleyball Draft
Jentry Lamirand	13	OH/L	5'11"	Senior	Decatur, TX	Graduated
Jordyn Schilling	14	L	5'11"	Senior	Newport Beach, CA	Graduated
Madison Scheer	15	OH	6'1"	Senior	Eureka, MO	Signed with USC Münster
Maggie Croft	20	MB	5'10"	Freshman	Corpus Christi, TX	—

=== Outgoing transfers ===
Name	Pos.	Height	Year	Hometown	New Team	Source
Kennedi Rogers	OH	5'10"	Freshman	Missouri City, TX	Tennessee	

=== Incoming transfers ===
Name	Pos.	Height	Year	Hometown	Previous Team	Source
Suli Davis	OH	6'2"	Sophomore	Euless, TX	BYU	
Victoria Harris	DS/L	5'4"	Junior	Columbia, SC	South Carolina	
Gabi Placide	OH	6'0"	Senior	Centennial, CO	Ole Miss	
Ellie Moore	S	5'9"	(redshirt) Sophomore	Darien, CT	Kansas	

=== Incoming recruits ===
2026 SMU Recruits
Name	Pos.	Height	Hometown	High School / Club
Bojana Ambulija	OPP	6'3"	Trebinje, Bosnia and Herzegovina	OK Dinamo
Levariya Pinder	OH	5'10"	Justin, TX	Northwest
Victoria Shupe	DS/L	5'7"	Spring, TX	Fort Bend Christian Academy
Elle Vandeweghe	MB	6'5"	Manhattan Beach, CA	Marymount

== Roster ==
2026 SMU Mustangs Roster
Libero/Defensive Specialists: 0 Victoria Harris – Junior; 2 Sarah Frazee – Sophomore; 6 Victoria Shupe – Freshman; 8 Mia Silva – (redshirt) Sophomore; Setters: 7 Ellie Moore – (redshirt) Sophomore; 11 Hannah Beauford – (redshirt) Freshman	Middle Blockers: 5 Elle Vandeweghe – Freshman; 10 Brooke Gilmour – Sophomore; 12 Natalia Newsome – Junior; 21 Favor Anyanwu – Junior	Outside/Opposite Hitters: 3 Bojana Ambulija – Freshman; 4 Christa Wilburn – Sophomore; 15 Gabi Placide – Senior; 17 Levariya Pinder – Freshman; 25 Suli Davis – Sophomore; 42 Jadyn Livings – Junior

=== Coaches ===
2026 SMU Mustangs Coaching Staff
- Sam Erger – head coach – 5th year
- Trent Sorensen – associate head coach
- Diego Aguilar – assistant coach
- Clayton Bristow – assistant coach
- Christa Branson – director of player personnel/recruiting coordinator – 5th year

=== Support staff ===
2026 SMU Mustangs Support Staff
- Carissa Barnes – director of operations
- Anthony Cockrill – director of volleyball sports performance
- Georgia Tauer – assistant athletic trainer

== Schedule ==
Date time, TV	Rank^{#}	Opponent^{#}	Result	Record	Site (attendance) city, state
Non-conference regular season
August 23*; 12:00 pm, ESPN2	No. 11	vs. No. 8 Texas A&M; AVCA First Serve	W 3–0 (27–25, 25–19, 25–20)	1–0	Fiserv Forum (4,106); Milwaukee, WI
August 27†; 8:00 pm, TNT	No. 11	vs. No. 10 Penn State (exh.); Spikes Under the Lights	W 2–0 (24–22, 21–18)	—	AT&T Stadium; Arlington, TX
August 27†; 10:00 pm, TNT	No. 11	vs. No. 1 Nebraska (exh.); Spikes Under the Lights	L 0–2 (12–21, 11–21)	—	AT&T Stadium; Arlington, TX
August 29*; 6:00 pm, YouTube	No. 11	at Colorado State	W 3–1 (25–20, 19–25, 25–23, 27–25)	2–0	Moby Arena (3,482); Fort Collins, CO
August 30*; 2:00 pm, YouTube	No. 11	vs. UC Davis	W 3–2 (27–25, 25–20, 20–25, 23–25, 15–12)	3–0	Moby Arena; Fort Collins, CO
September 2*; 6:30 pm, ESPN+	No. 8	at No. 18 TCU	L 2–3 (25–16, 22–25, 16–25, 28–26, 12–15)	3–1	Schollmaier Arena (2,271); Fort Worth, TX
September 4*; 9:00 pm, ESPN+	No. 8	at San Diego	W 3–1 (28–26, 22–25, 25–19, 25–21)	4–1	Jenny Craig Pavilion (1,380); San Diego, CA
September 9*; 8:00 pm, ACCN	No. 8	No. 9 Texas; Showdown at the Net	W 3–2 (25–21, 21–25, 25–22, 26–28, 15–10)	5–1	Moody Coliseum (6,207); Dallas, TX
September 12*; 1:00 pm, ESPN+	No. 8	vs. No. 3 Kentucky; Paradise Invitational	W 3–1 (27–25, 21–25, 25–21, 27–25)	6–1	Baha Mar Convention Center (1,000); Nassau, Bahamas
September 13*; 4:00 pm, ESPN	No. 8	vs. No. 14 Purdue; Paradise Invitational	L 0–3 (28–30, 23–25, 22–25)	6–2	Baha Mar Convention Center (674); Nassau, Bahamas
September 17*; 6:30 pm	No. 5	vs. Rice	W 3–0 (25–17, 25–18, 25–17)	7–2	Schollmaier Arena (1,032); Fort Worth, TX
September 19*; 1:00 pm, ACCNX	No. 5	Yale	W 3–0 (25–14, 25–18, 25–21)	8–2	Moody Coliseum (2,470); Dallas, TX
ACC regular season
September 25; 8:00 pm, ACCN	No. 5	No. 12 Stanford	W 3–0 (25–22, 25–13, 25–16)	9–2 (1–0)	Moody Coliseum (2,970); Dallas, TX
September 27; 1:00 pm, ACCN	No. 5	California	W 3–1 (19–25, 25–16, 25–20, 25–15)	10–2 (2–0)	Moody Coliseum (2,127); Dallas, TX
October 2; 5:00 pm, ACCNX	No. 5	at Syracuse	W 3–0 (25–18, 25–19, 25–16)	11–2 (3–0)	Women's Building (294); Syracuse, NY
October 4; 12:00 pm, ACCNX	No. 5	at Boston College	W 3–0 (25–19, 25–12, 25–18)	12–2 (4–0)	Connell Recreation Center (369); Chestnut Hill, MA
October 7; 6:00 pm, ACCN	No. 6	at No. 2 Pittsburgh	W 3–1 (21–25, 25–19, 38–36, 25–22)	13–2 (5–0)	Petersen Events Center (6,017); Pittsburgh, PA
October 11; 2:00 pm, ABC	No. 6	No. 2 Pittsburgh	L 0–3 (12–25, 21–25, 24–26)	13–3 (5–1)	Moody Coliseum (4,564); Dallas, TX
October 16; 7:00 pm, ACCNX	No. 5	Miami (FL)	L 2–3 (25–22, 25–19, 22–25, 31–33, 9–15)	13–4 (5–2)	Moody Coliseum (2,720); Dallas, TX
October 18; 1:00 pm, ACCNX	No. 5	Florida State	W 3–0 (25–22, 25–23, 25–16)	14–4 (6–2)	Moody Coliseum (2,437); Dallas, TX
October 23; 5:00 pm, ACCNX	No. 7	at Clemson	W 3–0 (25–17, 25–19, 25–17)	15–4 (7–2)	Jervey Gymnasium (876); Clemson, SC
October 25; 12:30 pm, ACCN	No. 7	at Georgia Tech	W 3–0 (26–24, 26–24, 25–21)	16–4 (8–2)	O'Keefe Gymnasium (1,855); Atlanta, GA
October 30; 6:00 pm, ACCNX	No. 5	at NC State	W 3–1 (23–25, 25–18, 25–19, 25–19)	17–4 (9–2)	Reynolds Coliseum (1,427); Raleigh, NC
November 1; 12:00 pm, ACCNX	No. 5	at Wake Forest	W 3–0 (27–25, 25–15, 25–22)	18–4 (10–2)	Reynolds Gymnasium (420); Winston-Salem, NC
November 6; 12:00 pm, ACCNX	No. 5	No. 20 North Carolina	W 3–0 (25–15, 25–15, 25–15)	19–4 (11–2)	Moody Coliseum (1,656); Dallas, TX
November 8; 12:00 pm, ACCNX	No. 5	Duke	W 3–0 (25–13, 25–23, 25–19)	20–4 (12–2)	Moody Coliseum (2,371); Dallas, TX
November 12; 7:00 pm, ESPNU	No. 5	Louisville	W 3–1 (25–21, 23–25, 25–19, 25-23)	21–4 (13–2)	Moody Coliseum (2,841); Dallas, TX
November 15; 12:00 pm, ACCNX		Notre Dame	W 3–0 (25–14, 25–23, 25–20)	22–4 (14–2)	Moody Coliseum; Dallas, TX
November 20; 6:00 pm, ACCNX		at Virginia Tech			Cassell Coliseum; Blacksburg, VA
November 22; 12:00 pm, ACCNX		at Virginia			Memorial Gymnasium; Charlottesville, VA
November 25; 1:00 pm, ACCNX		Georgia Tech			Moody Coliseum; Dallas, TX
November 28; 12:00 pm, ACCNX		at Louisville			L&N Federal Credit Union Arena; Louisville, KY
*Non-conference match. †Exhibition match; result does not count toward the team's record.^{#}Rankings from AVCA Coaches Poll at the time of the match. All times are in Central Time. Source:

== Awards and honors ==
Recipient	Award	Date	Ref.
Favor Anyanwu	AVCA Player of the Year Preseason Watch List	July 29	
Suli Davis	AVCA Player of the Year Preseason Watch List	July 29	
Favor Anyanwu	Preseason All-ACC Team	July 30	
Suli Davis	Preseason All-ACC Team	July 30	
Favor Anyanwu	ACC Defensive Player of the Week	September 14	
Suli Davis	ACC Offensive Player of the Week	September 14	
Hannah Beauford	ACC Setter of the Week	September 28	
Suli Davis	ACC Co-Offensive Player of the Week	September 28	
Natalia Newsome	ACC Defensive Player of the Week	October 5	
Hannah Beauford	ACC Co-Setter of the Week	October 26	

== Rankings ==
Ranking movements Legend: ██ Increase in ranking ██ Decrease in ranking
	Week															
Poll	Pre	1	2	3	4	5	6	7	8	9	10	11	12	13	14	Final
AVCA	11	8	8	5	5	5	6	5	7	5	5					
