= Mike Schall =

Current position
- Title: Head coach
- Team: North Carolina
- Conference: ACC
- Record: 76–37 (.673)

Biographical details
- Born: April 5, 1971 (age 55)
- Education: Penn State

Playing career
- 1988–1991: Penn State

Coaching career (HC unless noted)
- 1994–2005: Penn State (assistant)
- 2018–2022: North Carolina (assistant)
- 2023–present: North Carolina

Michael Allen Schall (born April 5, 1971) is an American former volleyball player who is the head coach of the North Carolina Tar Heels women's volleyball team.

== Career ==
=== Playing career ===
Schall played volleyball for the Penn State Nittany Lions men's volleyball team from 1988 to 1991. He has two brothers, Jim and Dan, who also both played volleyball at Penn State. During his career, Penn State claimed three Eastern Intercollegiate Volleyball Association titles and advanced to three final fours. A co-captain for two seasons, Schall played in every match of his four-year career.

=== Coaching career ===
Schall's head coaching career began at his alma mater Penn State. He was named as an assistant coach in 1994 for the women's team under head coach Russ Rose. In his twelve seasons with the program, Penn State recorded an overall record of 447-67 (.870), claimed nine Big Ten Conference volleyball titles, and won the 1999 NCAA title.

He took a break from collegiate coaching for several years, serving in administrative roles for Triangle Volleyball Club in North Carolina.

He returned to collegiate coaching in 2018 when he was named an assistant coach for the North Carolina Tar Heels women's volleyball team. In 2023, he was promoted to head coach.

== Head coaching record ==
Record table
Season	Team	Overall	Conference	Standing	Postseason
North Carolina Tar Heels (Atlantic Coast Conference) (2023–present)
2023	North Carolina	13–14	7–11	11th	
2024	North Carolina	23–8	14–6	5th	NCAA Second Round
2025	North Carolina	22–9	14–6	6th	NCAA Second Round
2026	North Carolina	18–6	13–3		TBD
North Carolina:		76–37 (.673)	48–26 (.649)		
Total:		76–37 (.673)			
