= Dan Meske =

American indoor volleyball player and coach

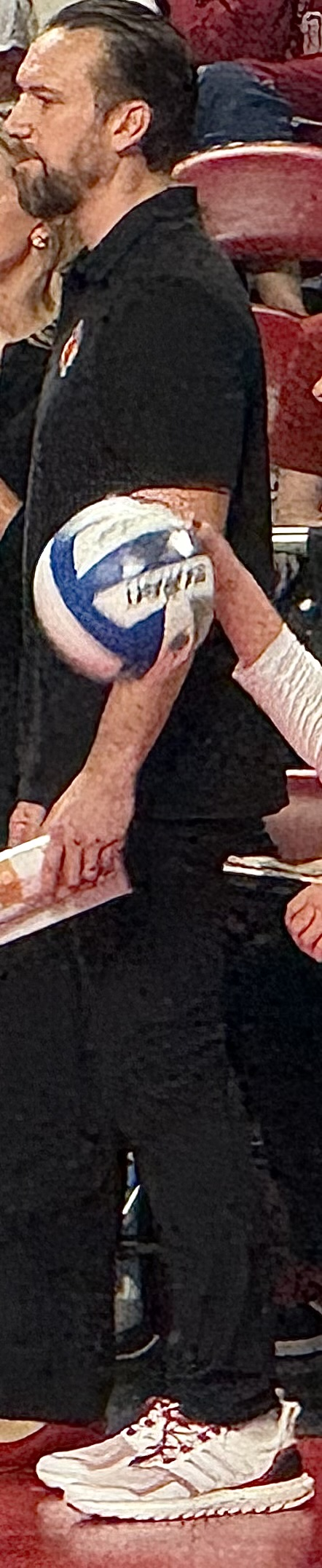
- Meske in 2024

Current position
- Title: Head coach
- Team: Louisville
- Conference: ACC
- Record: 51–11 (.823)
- Annual salary: $300,000

Biographical details
- Born: December 15, 1984 (age 41); Willow Springs, Illinois

Playing career
- 2004–2007: Ohio State
- 2008: BNI Taplus Volleyball

Coaching career (HC unless noted)
- 2007–2014: Nebraska (Assistant)
- 2015-2016: Augustana
- 2017–2024: Louisville (Assistant)
- 2025–Present: Louisville

Head coaching record
- Overall: 51–11 (.823)
- Tournaments: NCAA: 2–1 (.667)

Accomplishments and honors

Awards
- AVCA National Assistant Coach of the Year (2022)

Dan Christopher Meske (born December 15, 1984) is an American former indoor volleyball player and current head coach of the Louisville Cardinals women's volleyball team.

== Early life and playing career ==
Meske grew up in Willow Springs, Illinois outside of Chicago in the Chicago metropolitan area. He attended Lyons Township High School where he excelled at volleyball, earning first team all state and finishing 4th in the state championship.

Meske went on to play four years at Ohio State. During his career, he would help lead OSU to a 2005 national semifinal appearance and two MIVA championships before graduating in 2007 with a bachelor's degree in construction management.

Meske spent one season playing professionally for the BNI Taplus Volleyball team in 2008.

== Coaching career ==
=== Nebraska ===
Meske began his collegiate coaching career at the Nebraska where he began as the team's graduate manager in 2007 before serving as a volunteer coach and eventually became a full-time assistant coach.

=== Augustana ===
Meske's first head coaching experience came at Augustana, an NCAA Division II school in Sioux Falls where he coached women's volleyball team from 2015 to 2016. In his two seasons leading the team, the Vikings made their first NCAA Tournament appearance since 2008 and won their first tournament game since 2006.

=== Louisville ===
In 2017, Dan Meske left Augustana and joined the Louisville coaching staff as an assistant coach to head coach Dani Busboom Kelly. In his eight years under Busboom Kelly, he helped the Louisville program reach new heights including eight straight NCAA Tournament appearances, the first Elite Eight appearance in program history, winning four ACC Championships, three national semifinal appearances, and two national championship appearances. In 2022, Meske was named the AVCA National Assistant Coach of the Year.

Meske was named the eighth head coach of the University of Louisville women's volleyball team following the departure of Busboom Kelly in January 2025.

== Personal life ==
Dan Meske is married to his wife Laurel, who played volleyball at Creighton. They have three children together.

== Head coaching record ==
Record table
Season	Team	Overall	Conference	Standing	Postseason
Louisville Cardinals (Atlantic Coast Conference) (2025–present)
2025	Louisville	26–7	16–4	T–4th	NCAA Sweet 16
2026	Louisville	25–4	15–2		TBD
Louisville:		51–11 (.823)	31–6 (.838)		
Total:		51–11 (.823)			
