= Nebraska–Penn State volleyball rivalry =

College volleyball rivalry in the United States

- Nebraska Cornhuskers Penn State Nittany Lions
- Sport: College volleyball
- First meeting: October 2, 1981; Penn State, 2–0
- Latest meeting: October 1, 2026; Nebraska, 3–0
- Stadiums: John Cook Arena; Rec Hall; Nebraska Coliseum (former)

Statistics
- Total meetings: 44
- All-time series: Nebraska leads, 31–13
- Longest win streak: Nebraska, 7 (two times)
- Current win streak: Nebraska, 3

Locations of Nebraska and Penn State

The Nebraska–Penn State volleyball rivalry is a college women's volleyball rivalry between the Nebraska Cornhuskers and Penn State Nittany Lions. Both programs are among the most successful in the history of NCAA Division I women's volleyball. Prior to 2011, the teams competed frequently as out-of-conference opponents and met nine times in the NCAA tournament. Since Nebraska joined the Big Ten they have typically played twice annually as conference opponents. Nebraska leads the series 31–13.

== History ==
=== Early years ===
Nebraska and Penn State are two of the most decorated programs in collegiate volleyball history. The Cornhuskers have the most wins, conference championships, and All-Americans of any program, while the Nittany Lions lead in win percentage and rank second in national championships. They have met eleven times in the NCAA Division I women's volleyball tournament, with Nebraska hosting and winning eight of them, though Penn State is 2–1 in three national semifinal meetings. Both teams have been ranked in the AVCA Top 25 for all but one of their thirty-six matches, and both have been in the top ten for twenty-four, including nineteen straight meetings from 1994 to 2016.

The first meeting between the Cornhuskers and Nittany Lions was a 15–2, 15–8 Penn State sweep on October 2, 1981 in Springfield, Missouri as part of the Southwest Missouri State Invitational. Despite losing the first match between the programs, Terry Pettit and Nebraska soon became the first Midwestern national power in a sport that was still largely dominated by West Coast programs (seventeen of the first twenty-four NCAA Tournaments were won by schools from California, with three more from Hawaii). NU won nine of the next ten meetings with PSU, and knocked the Nittany Lions out of the NCAA tournament six times between 1982 and 1996, including a 3–1 win over 44–0 Penn State in the 1990 Mideast Regional Final. Pettit's run of success culminated in 1995 with Nebraska's first national championship, a title run that included a 3–1 win over Penn State in the regional semifinal.

=== National powers ===
Penn State's fortunes, both on the national scene and against Nebraska, began to turn in 1997; the Nittany Lions beat the Cornhuskers for the third time and spent much of the year ranked No. 1, reaching the national title game. In 1998, the programs met in the national semifinal for the first time. Undefeated Penn State beat Nebraska 3–1 to set up a match with undefeated Long Beach State, though PSU lost the title game for a second consecutive year. Penn State head coach Russ Rose, a Nebraska graduate and former assistant, won his first national title the following year, which included an early-season win over Nebraska in Lincoln.

After meeting fourteen times in the first eighteen years of the rivalry, Nebraska and Penn State played just three times in the 2000s, due largely to the national expansion of college volleyball and the lack of necessity for the schools to be placed in the same tournament region. What this period in the rivalry lacked in frequency it made up for in quality, as all three of these matchups included the No. 1 team in the country. Either Nebraska or Penn State occupied the No. 1 spot in the AVCA national poll for eighty-one consecutive weeks, a streak that stretched from November 29, 2004 to September 13, 2010. NU, led by head coach John Cook following Pettit's retirement in 1999, won national championships in 2000 and 2006, and Penn State followed by winning an NCAA-record four consecutive titles from 2007 to 2010. The 2008 national semifinal meeting between the schools is often considered one of the great college volleyball games ever played.

=== Conference opponents ===
The rivalry became an annual occurrence for the first time when the University of Nebraska–Lincoln joined the Big Ten in 2011. In a press conference prior to Nebraska's first Big Ten season, Cook quipped of Rose, "Russ and I — I wouldn't say we're best friends, but we have a good relationship. It's hot and cold. It's like dating."

For several years the teams largely traded blows in conference play, splitting the first eight Big Ten matchups evenly. However, on the national scene Penn State continued its dominance over the rest of the country, winning another set of back-to-back national championships in 2013 and 2014 to give Rose a record-setting seven titles in total. Since the last of these titles, the series has decisively flipped to Nebraska, which has taken twelve of the past thirteen meetings with Penn State, including both NCAA Tournament matchups. Cook has taken NU to the national title game four times since PSU's last appearance, winning in 2015 and 2017.

In 2021, Rose, the only coach in Penn State volleyball history, retired with a career record of 1,330–229; his 1,264 wins in the NCAA era are the most all-time. Former Penn State outside hitter Katie Schumacher-Cawley was named his replacement. Four years later, Cook retired after 25 years at Nebraska. Former Cornhusker player and Louisville head coach Dani Busboom Kelly was named his successor.

== Memorable games ==
Dec. 17, 1998 (Penn State 3, Nebraska 1)

Nebraska and Penn State met in the national semifinal for the first time in 1998 in Madison, Wisconsin. Despite four national semifinal appearances in the previous six seasons, PSU had won just once in seven tries against NU in the NCAA tournament. The undefeated Nittany Lions jumped out to a 2–0 lead behind Lauren Cacciamani and All-American Bonnie Bremner. The Cornhuskers ran away with the third set to keep the match alive, but PSU took the fourth and the match. It was the second of three consecutive wins against NU for the Nittany Lions, one in each of 1997, 1998, and 1999. Penn State improved to 35–0 but lost the national title game to Long Beach State.

Dec. 18, 2008 (Penn State 3, Nebraska 2)

Nearly ten years to the day since their most recent NCAA Tournament meeting, No. 1 Penn State met No. 4 Nebraska in the national semifinal in front of a then-NCAA record crowd of 17,430 at the Qwest Center in Omaha, just fifty miles from Nebraska's Lincoln campus. The defending national champion Nittany Lions, 36–0 and without a single set loss all season, quickly opened up a two sets-to-none advantage. Nebraska dominated the first set out of intermission 25–15 to snap PSU's NCAA-record streak of 111 consecutive set wins, and then took the fourth to send the match to a decisive fifth set. NU surged out to a 10–8 lead before a six-point service run by AVCA National Player of the Year Nicole Fawcett gave the Nittany Lions a 14–10 lead that NU could not overcome.

It was Nebraska's first-ever loss at the Qwest Center, where they were previously 14–0, and snapped a ninety-six-match win streak in the state of Nebraska. Penn State swept Stanford two days later to win their second of what would become four consecutive national titles. The 2008 national semifinal has been termed "the greatest match in volleyball history", and United States men's national team coach Karch Kiraly, who broadcast the game for ESPN, said he "gets chills every time I think about it."

Dec. 9, 2016 (Nebraska 3, Penn State 2)

No. 15 Penn State traveled to Lincoln to face top-seeded Nebraska at the Devaney Center in the 2016 Regional semifinal, the first NCAA Tournament in which the top four national seeds were able to host more than two matches. The defending national champion Cornhuskers had easily dispatched the Nittany Lions just weeks earlier, but it was PSU that jumped out to a two-set lead at intermission of the tournament matchup. Despite not trailing by more than two points at any point in the match, Nebraska faced a 24–22 deficit and two Penn State set points in the third set. After a PSU service error, an Amber Rolfzen block of Simone Lee tied the set at 24, and a pair of Mikaela Foecke kills won it. NU dominated the final two sets to win the match 3–2. Nebraska advanced to the national semifinal for the second consecutive year, but fell to Texas.

Dec. 14, 2017 (Nebraska 3, Penn State 2)

Nebraska and Penn State met for a third time in the national semifinal at the Sprint Center in Kansas City, Missouri on December 14, 2017. NU had won six consecutive games against Penn State, including the first sweep of PSU by a visiting team at Rec Hall in fourteen years earlier in the season, but the top-ranked Nittany Lions were 33–1 and had won twenty-three consecutive matches. No. 5 Nebraska won the first set 25–18, but the following three sets were each decided by two points. Penn State's only set point of the match came with a 26–25 lead in set four, when two Nittany Lions tripped on each other and allowed the ball to fall for a game-tying Nebraska point. The Cornhuskers won the next two points to take the set 28–26, and held on to win the fifth set and advance to the national championship game. The match set a new NCAA attendance record at 18,374. Nebraska defeated Florida two days later to win the national title.

== Game results ==
Nebraska victory	Penn State victory

No.	Date	Site	Winning team	Losing team	Score
1	Oct. 2, 1981	Springfield	No. 15 Penn State	No. 19 Nebraska	15–2, 15–8
2	Dec. 4, 1982	Lincoln	No. 15 Nebraska	Penn State	15–13, 15–5, 15–13
3	Dec. 7, 1985	Lincoln	No. 4 Nebraska	No. 20 Penn State	15–8, 15–7, 15–12
4	Dec. 12, 1986	Lincoln	No. 7 Nebraska	No. 14 Penn State	7–15, 15–4, 16–14, 16–18, 15–9
5	Sept. 12, 1987	Lincoln	No. 6 Nebraska	No. 20 Penn State	15–12, 15–12, 15–17, 15–7
6	Dec. 8, 1990	Lincoln	No. 2 Nebraska	No. 6 Penn State	15–12, 16–14, 10–15, 15–5
7	Sept. 4, 1993	State College	No. 7 Nebraska	No. 11 Penn State	15–11, 9–15, 15–4, 15–17, 15–10
8	Dec. 10, 1994	Lincoln	No. 5 Penn State	No. 1 Nebraska	12–15, 15–11, 15–9, 15–8
9	Aug. 25, 1995	Lincoln	No. 2 Nebraska	No. 7 Penn State	15–4, 15–3, 15–6
10	Dec. 8, 1995	Lincoln	No. 1 Nebraska	No. 9 Penn State	15–7, 15–6, 14–16, 15–2
11	Dec. 14, 1996	Lincoln	No. 4 Nebraska	No. 3 Penn State	15–12, 8–15, 15–13, 9–15, 20–18
12	Sept. 19, 1997	Madison	No. 1 Penn State	No. 5 Nebraska	16–14, 15–12, 16–14
13	Dec. 19, 1998	Madison	No. 2 Penn State	No. 3 Nebraska	15–11, 15–8, 8–15, 15–11
14	Aug. 28, 1999	Lincoln	No. 1 Penn State	No. 3 Nebraska	11–15, 15–12, 15–8, 16–14
15	Sept. 11, 2005	Lincoln	No. 1 Nebraska	No. 4 Penn State	30–14, 30–27, 30–23
16	Sept. 2, 2007	Omaha	No. 1 Nebraska	No. 3 Penn State	30–20, 30–21, 30–27
17	Dec. 18, 2008	Omaha	No. 1 Penn State	No. 4 Nebraska	25–17, 25–18, 15–25, 22–25, 15–11
18	Sept. 21, 2011	Lincoln	No. 10 Nebraska	No. 5 Penn State	25–18, 25–16, 23–25, 19–25, 15–10
19	Oct. 29, 2011	State College	No. 8 Penn State	No. 1 Nebraska	25–17, 25–15, 17–25, 25–17
20	Sept. 19, 2012	State College	No. 4 Penn State	No. 3 Nebraska	23–25, 28–26, 25–17, 26–24
21	Oct. 28, 2012	Lincoln	No. 4 Nebraska	No. 1 Penn State	12–25, 32–30, 19–25, 25–23, 15–10
22	Nov. 30, 2013	Lincoln	No. 2 Penn State	No. 10 Nebraska	22–25, 25–23, 26–24, 26–24
23	Oct. 3, 2014	Lincoln	No. 8 Nebraska	No. 3 Penn State	12–25, 25–22, 25–20, 25–23
24	Nov. 29, 2014	State College	No. 4 Penn State	No. 10 Nebraska	25–21, 25–15, 25–16
25	Oct. 2, 2015	State College	No. 4 Nebraska	No. 1 Penn State	12–25, 24–26, 25–14, 25–20, 15–11
26	Nov. 28, 2015	Lincoln	No. 5 Nebraska	No. 7 Penn State	25–18, 25–18, 25–18
27	Nov. 4, 2016	State College	No. 1 Nebraska	No. 11 Penn State	22–25, 25–17, 25–23, 23–25, 15–11
28	Nov. 16, 2016	Lincoln	No. 1 Nebraska	No. 15 Penn State	25–17, 25–14, 25–22
29	Dec. 9, 2016	Lincoln	No. 2 Nebraska	No. 13 Penn State	23–25, 23–25, 26–24, 25–19, 15–6
30	Sept. 29, 2017	State College	No. 14 Nebraska	No. 2 Penn State	26–24, 25–19, 25–20
31	Dec. 14, 2017	Kansas City	No. 5 Nebraska	No. 1 Penn State	25–18, 23–25, 24–26, 28–26, 15–11
32	Oct. 13, 2018	State College	No. 9 Penn State	No. 5 Nebraska	25–22, 11–25, 24–26, 25–23, 15–9
33	Nov. 2, 2018	Lincoln	No. 8 Nebraska	No. 7 Penn State	25–27, 25–19, 21–25, 25–18, 15–8
34	Nov. 2, 2019	Lincoln	No. 8 Nebraska	No. 7 Penn State	25–18, 18–25, 25–21, 21–25, 15–3
35	Oct. 8, 2021	State College	No. 10 Nebraska	No. 13 Penn State	25–16, 22–25, 25–23, 25–7
36	Nov. 19, 2021	Lincoln	No. 11 Nebraska	No. 15 Penn State	25–14, 25–23, 25–23
37	Oct. 14, 2022	Lincoln	No. 3 Nebraska	No. 14 Penn State	25–18, 25–22, 25–9
38	Oct. 14, 2023	Lincoln	No. 2 Nebraska	No. 13 Penn State	25–22, 25–22, 25–19
39	Nov. 3, 2023	State College	No. 1 Nebraska	No. 16 Penn State	15–25, 23–25, 25–18, 25–20, 15–13
40	Nov. 29, 2024	State College	No. 4 Penn State	No. 2 Nebraska	25–21, 14–25, 25–22, 25–23
41	Dec. 20, 2024	Louisville	No. 2 Penn State	No. 3 Nebraska	23–25, 18–25, 25–23, 28–26, 15–13
42	Oct. 3, 2025	State College	No. 1 Nebraska	No. 16 Penn State	25–6, 25–15, 25–13
43	Nov. 28, 2025	Lincoln	No. 1 Nebraska	No. 25 Penn State	25–14, 25–11, 25–14
44	Oct. 1, 2026	State College	No. 1 Nebraska	No. 16 Penn State	25–20, 25–17, 25–18

=== Results by venue ===
Venue	Series
John Cook Arena	NU 10–1
Nebraska Coliseum	NU 11–2
Rec Hall	NU 8–5
Neutral	PSU 5–2

=== Results by game type ===
Game type	Series
Conference	NU 17–6
Non-conference	NU 5–3
NCAA tournament	NU 8–4
