= Jamie Morrison (volleyball) =

American volleyball coach

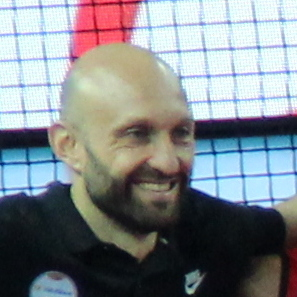
- Morrison in 2016

Current position
- Title: Head coach
- Team: Texas A&M
- Conference: SEC
- Record: 80–37 (.684)

Biographical details
- Born: November 12, 1980 (age 46); Laguna Beach, California, U.S.
- Education: UC Santa Barbara

Coaching career (HC unless noted)
- 2005–2009: (United States) U.S. National Team (men's) (assistant)
- 2007–2008: Concordia (assistant)
- 2009–2012; 2014–2016: (United States) U.S. National Team (women's) (assistant)
- 2010–2011: (Austria) SVS Post Schwechat
- 2012–2013: UC Irvine (assistant)
- 2017–2019: Netherlands
- 2021: Texas (volunteer assistant)
- 2023–present: Texas A&M

Accomplishments and honors

Championships
- 1x NCAA national champions (2025)

Awards
- AVCA Division I National Coach of the Year (2025)

Jamie Douglas Morrison (born November 12, 1980) is an American volleyball coach. Since 2023, he has been the head coach for the Texas A&M Aggies women's volleyball team. He previously served as the head coach of the Dutch national team, which he coached at the 2017 Women's European Volleyball Championship, and has formerly served on the coaching staff for the U.S. men's and women's national volleyball teams.

In his first year with Texas A&M, Morrison coached the team to a winning record and earned a spot in the NCAA post-season tournament for the first time in four years. In 2025, he led the team to its first-ever national semifinals and national championship match appearances, ultimately winning the program's first national championship in a sweep of Kentucky.

== Coaching ==
=== Texas A&M ===
Morrison was named head coach of the Texas A&M Aggies women's volleyball team in 2023, earning an NCAA tournament appearance each year. In 2025, he was named the American Volleyball Coaches Association (AVCA) National Coach of the Year after guiding Texas A&M to a record-setting season. He led the team to the program's first ever NCAA final four after upsetting top-ranked and then-undefeated Nebraska. Morrison followed that win by guiding the Aggies to their first ever National Championship, sweeping both Pittsburgh in the semifinals and Kentucky in the finals.

== Head coaching record ==
Record table
Season	Team	Overall	Conference	Standing	Postseason
Texas A&M (Southeastern Conference) (2023–present)
2023	Texas A&M	16–13	8–10	8th	NCAA First Round
2024	Texas A&M	21–8	10–6	5th	NCAA Regional Semifinal
2025	Texas A&M	29–4	14–1	2nd	NCAA National Champions
2026	Texas A&M	16–12	9–6	7th	TBD
Texas A&M:		80–37 (.684)	41–23 (.641)		
Total:		80–37 (.684)			
National champion Postseason invitational champion Conference regular season champion Conference regular season and conference tournament champion Division regular season champion Division regular season and conference tournament champion Conference tournament champion
