= Louisville Cardinals women's volleyball =

Women's volleyball team of the University of Louisville

- 2026 Louisville Cardinals women's volleyball team
- Founded: 1977; 49 years ago
- University: University of Louisville
- Athletic director: Josh Heird
- Head coach: Dan Meske (2nd season)
- Conference: ACC
- Location: Louisville, Kentucky, US
- Home arena: L&N Arena (capacity: 1,331)
- Nickname: Cardinals
- Colors: Red and black

AIAW/NCAA tournament runner-up
- 2022, 2024

AIAW/NCAA tournament semifinal
- 2021, 2022, 2024

AIAW/NCAA Regional Final
- 2019, 2021, 2022, 2023, 2024

AIAW/NCAA regional semifinal
- 1996, 1998, 2019, 2021, 2022, 2023, 2024, 2025

AIAW/NCAA tournament appearance
- 1982, 1990, 1991, 1992, 1993, 1994, 1995, 1996, 1998, 1999, 2000, 2001, 2002, 2003, 2004, 2005, 2006, 2007, 2008, 2009, 2010, 2011, 2012, 2013, 2015, 2017, 2018, 2019, 2020, 2021, 2022, 2023, 2024, 2025

Conference tournament champion
- CUSA; 1998, 2000, 2003, 2004 Big East; 2006, 2008, 2009, 2010, 2012

Conference regular season champion
- Metro; 1982, 1984, 1990, 1991, 1992, 1993, 1994 CUSA; 1995, 1996, 1999, 2002, 2003, 2004 Big East; 2005, 2007, 2011, 2012 AAC; 2013 ACC; 2015, 2017, 2020, 2021, 2022

The Louisville Cardinals women's volleyball team competes as part of NCAA Division I, representing the University of Louisville in the ACC. Louisville plays its home games at the L&N Federal Credit Union Arena. The team has been coached by Dan Meske since 2025.

== History ==
=== Susan Johns (1977–1979) ===
Louisvilles first women's volleyball season came in 1977 under head coach Susan Johns. She held the job for 3 seasons finishing with a record of 28–60.

=== Scott Luster (1980–1984) ===
Scott Luster was hired as the head coach in 1980. In 1982, he led the Cards to their first conference title in program history and first NCAA tournament berth. He would total two Metro Conference title and two NCAA tournament bids in 5 seasons at Louisville.

=== Don Hardin (1988–1995) ===
Don Hardin finished his tenure at Louisville as the most successful coach in program history and set the program up for its future success. He finished with an overall record of 192–76 after eight seasons at Louisville. He led the Cards to six regular season conference titles and six NCAA tournament berths.

=== Leonid Yelin (1996–2010) ===
Leonid Yelin is the programs all-time winningest head coach. Under Yelin, the Cardinals won multiple CUSA regular season and tournament titles. In 1996, Louisville reached the Sweet Sixteen for the first time in program history. The Cards would reach the Sweet Sixteen a total four times in 1996, 1998, 2004, and 2005.

=== Anne Kordes (2011–2016) ===
Following the retirement of Leonid Yelin in 2011, former Louisville player Anne Kordes was hired. In 2016, Kordes announced her resignation to spend more time with her family.

=== Dani Busboom Kelly (2017–2024) ===
Dani Busboom Kelly was hired as the head coach at Louisville in 2017. Under Busboom Kelly, the program would reach new heights including reaching the first Elite Eight in program history and reaching the national championship twice.

On January 29, 2025, she was hired by her alma mater to be the head coach of the Nebraska Cornhuskers women's volleyball.

=== Dan Meske (2025–present) ===
Following the departure of Dani Busboom Kelly, Dan Meske was hired as the head coach of Louisville. Meske was the associate head coach under Kelly since 2017. In 2022, he was name the AVCA Assistant Coach of the Year.

== Season-by-season results ==
Season	Team	Overall	Conference	Standing	Postseason	AVCA poll
Susan Johns (–) (1977–1979)
1977	Susan Johns	4–18				
1978	Susan Johns	11–18				
1979	Susan Johns	13–24				
Total:		28–60	–			
Scott Luster (Metro Conference) (1980–1984)
1980	Scott Luster	10–23				
1981	Scott Luster	26–18				
1982	Scott Luster	39–14	10–1	1st	NCAA Division I first round	
1983	Scott Luster	33–19	9–3	3rd		
1984	Scott Luster	29–12	7–0	1st		
Total:		137–86	26–4			
Bob McCarthy (Metro Conference) (1985–1987)
1985	Bob McCarthy	18–19	5–1			
1986	Bob McCarthy	17–25	2–4			
1987	Bob McCarthy	14–15	2–3			
Total:		49–59	9–8			
Don Hardin (Metro Conference) (1988–1994)
1988	Don Hardin	16–15	3–3	4th		
1989	Don Hardin	21–12	5–2			
1990	Don Hardin	22–8	5–2	1st	NCAA Division I first round	
1991	Don Hardin	28–8	6–0	1st	NCAA Division I first round	
1992	Don Hardin	24–9	5–1	1st	NCAA Division I first round	
1993	Don Hardin	23–13	5–1	1st	NCAA Division I first round	
1994	Don Hardin	29–5	6–0	1st	NCAA Division I first round	
Don Hardin (Conference USA) (1995–1995)
1995	Don Hardin	29–6	12–0	1st	NCAA Division I second round	
Total:		192–76	47–9			
Leonid Yelin (Conference USA) (1996–2004)
1996	Leonid Yelin	26–5	13–1	1st	NCAA Division I Regional Final	16
1997	Leonid Yelin	16–12	13–3	1st (American)		
1998	Leonid Yelin	29–5	14–2	1st	NCAA Division I Regional Final	21
1999	Leonid Yelin	19–12	13–3	T-1st	NCAA Division I first round	
2000	Leonid Yelin	26–8	12–4	2nd	NCAA Division I first round	
2001	Leonid Yelin	26–7	13–3	2nd	NCAA Division I second round	
2002	Leonid Yelin	28–6	12–1	T-1st	NCAA Division I second round	
2003	Leonid Yelin	25–6	12–1	T-1st	NCAA Division I second round	20
2004	Leonid Yelin	30–3	13–0	1st	NCAA Division I Regional Final	16
Leonid Yelin (Big East Conference) (2005–2010)
2005	Leonid Yelin	31–3	13–1	1st	NCAA Division I Regional Final	11
2006	Leonid Yelin	25–7	13–1	1st	NCAA Division I first round	
2007	Leonid Yelin	22–8	13–1	T-1st	NCAA Division I first round	
2008	Leonid Yelin	19–11	11–3	3rd	NCAA Division I first round	
2009	Leonid Yelin	21–11	10–4	4th	NCAA Division I first round	
2010	Leonid Yelin	23–8	12–2	2nd	NCAA Division I second round	
Total:		366–112	187–30			
Anne Kordes (Big East Conference) (2011–2012)
2011	Anne Kordes	24–9	13–1	1st	NCAA Division I second round	
2012	Anne Kordes	30–4	14–1	1st	NCAA Division I second round	17
Anne Kordes (American Athletic Conference) (2013–2013)
2013	Anne Kordes	23–8	18–0	1st	NCAA Division I first round	
Anne Kordes (Atlantic Coast Conference) (2014–2016)
2014	Anne Kordes	15–15	7–11	8th		
2015	Anne Kordes	27–5	18–2	1st	NCAA Division I second round	21
2016	Anne Kordes	12–18	7–13	10th		
Total:		131–59	77–28			
Dani Busboom Kelly (Atlantic Coast Conference) (2017–2024)
2017	Dani Busboom Kelly	27–4	18–2	1st	NCAA Division I first round	
2018	Dani Busboom Kelly	24–9	14–4	T-3rd	NCAA Division I second round	
2019	Dani Busboom Kelly	22–10	12–6	3rd	NCAA Division I Elite Eight	14
2020	Dani Busboom Kelly	15–3	12–2	1st	NCAA Division I Sweet Sixteen	11
2021	Dani Busboom Kelly	32–1	18–0	1st	NCAA Division I National Semifinals	3
2022	Dani Busboom Kelly	31–3	17–1	1st	NCAA Division I Runner-up	2
2023	Dani Busboom Kelly	27–5	15–3	3rd	NCAA Division I Elite Eight	6
2024	Dani Busboom Kelly	30–6	17–3	3rd	NCAA Division I Runner-up	2
Total:		208–41	123–21			
Dan Meske (Atlantic Coast Conference) (2025–present)
2025	Dan Meske	26-7	16-4	T-4th	NCAA Division I Sweet Sixteen	9
Total:		26-7	16-4			
Total:		1137–500	494–112			
National champion Conference regular season champion Conference regular season and conference tournament champion Division regular season champion Division regular season and conference tournament champion Conference tournament champion

== Conference affiliations ==
Louisville has been affiliated with multiple conferences.

- Metro Conference (1977–1994)
- Conference USA (1995–2004)
- Big East (2005–2012)
- American Athletic Conference (2013)
- Atlantic Coast Conference (2014–present)

== Championships ==
=== Conference championships ===
Louisville claims twenty-one conference regular season titles and ten conference tournament championships.

=== Big East Championships ===
Louisville joined the Big East Conference in 1995. Louisville would win four conference tournaments in 1998, 2000, 2003, and 2004 and six conference regular season titles in 1995, 1996, 199, 2002, 2003, and 2004.

=== ACC Championships ===
Louisville became a member of the Atlantic Coast Conference (ACC) in 2014 and won its first ACC championship in 2015, the first by any Louisville team. The Cards would then win the conference in 2017, 2020, 2021, and tied with Pittsburgh in 2022. The ACC recognizes the regular season champion as the conference champion and has not held a conference championship tournament since Pitt joined the conference.

== Rivalries ==
=== Pittsburgh ===
The volleyball rivalry between Louisville and Pittsburgh began in 1981. As of 2025, Louisville is 22–18 in the series. The series became a conference rivalry after Louisville joined the Big East and after both programs moved to the ACC.

The rivalry reached a new level after Dani Busboom Kelly was hired at Louisville, with both programs regularly competing for the conference regular season and tournament titles. Both programs began having sustained success at the national level with Louisville and Pitt making their programs first Elite Eight in 2019 and 2020 respectively and regularly earning top seeds in the NCAA Tournament.

In 2022, the two programs met in the Final Four for the first time. Louisville would go on to beat Pitt 3–2 to reach the first national championship berth in program history. The two program would meet in the Final Four again in 2024 where Louisville would once again defeat Pitt 3–1 to advance to its second national championship berth in 3 seasons.

=== Kentucky ===
The in-state rivalry with Kentucky began in 1976 when the two programs played for the first time. As of 2025, Louisville is 30–37 in the series.

== See also ==
- List of NCAA Division I women's volleyball programs
