= Utah Valley Wolverines women's volleyball =

College volleyball team

- Founded: 2003; 23 years ago
- University: Utah Valley University
- Athletic director: Jared Sumsion
- Head coach: Sam Atoa (21st season)
- Conference: Big West
- Location: Orem, Utah, US
- Home arena: Lockhart Arena (capacity: 2,000)
- Nickname: Wolverines
- Colors: Green and white

AIAW/NCAA tournament appearance
- 2020, 2021, 2025

Conference tournament champion
- 2012, 2020, 2021, 2025

Conference regular season champion
- 2011, 2012, 2025

The Utah Valley Wolverines women's volleyball team competes as part of NCAA Division I, representing Utah Valley University in the Big West Conference. Utah Valley plays its home games at Lockhart Arena in Orem, Utah.

== History ==
Utah Valley was originally an NJCAA team before joining the NCAA as a Division I member in 2003. They finished their first Division I season with a 10–14 record.

From 2003 to 2008 Utah Valley was a Division I independent team before joining the Great West Conference in 2009.

In 2011 The Wolverines would win the Great West Conference volleyball regular-season championship. They would repeat as GWC regular season champions in 2012 and also win the 2012 Great West Conference Volleyball Tournament.

Utah Valley joined the Western Athletic Conference in 2013.

In 2020, Utah Valley won the Western Athletic Conference Volleyball tournament and made the 2020 NCAA Division I women's volleyball tournament, their first NCAA volleyball tournament appearance in program history. One season later in 2021, The Wolverines would repeat as WAC tournament champions and make the 2021 NCAA Division I women's volleyball tournament.

Utah Valley has an all-time record of 331–253.

== Postseason results ==
=== NCAA Tournament ===
Utah Valley has appeared in the NCAA Tournament three times. Their combined record is 0–3.

Year	Seed	Round	Opponent	Result
2020	--	First Round	Texas State	L 1–3
2021	--	First Round	Utah	L 1–3
2025	--	First Round	Stanford	L 1–3

=== NIVC Tournament ===
Utah Valley has appeared in the National Invitational Volleyball Championship one time. Their combined record is 1–1.

Year	Seed	Round	Opponent	Result
2018	--	First Round; Second Round	Wyoming; Portland	L W

== Coaches ==
=== Coaching history ===
No.	Coach	Tenure	Overall	Conference	Achievements
1	Sam Atoa	2003–present	331-253 (.567)	240-179 (.573)	3 regular season conference titles and 3 NCAA tournament appearances
