= Salima Rockwell =

American volleyball player (born 1972)

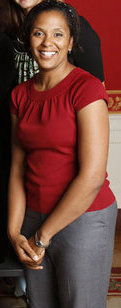
- Rockwell in 2008

Current position
- Title: Head coach
- Team: Notre Dame
- Conference: ACC
- Record: 45–66 (.405)

Biographical details
- Born: January 24, 1972 (age 54); Pittsburgh, Pennsylvania, U.S.
- Education: Pennsylvania State University

Playing career
- 1991–1994: Penn State
- 1997–1998: United States National Team

Coaching career (HC unless noted)
- 2006–2008: Penn State (assistant)
- 2009–2013: Texas (assistant)
- 2014–2017: Penn State (Associate HC)
- 2022–present: Notre Dame

Accomplishments and honors

Awards
- AVCA Division I National Assistant Coach of the Year (2013)

Salima Kulsum Rockwell (née Davidson; born January 24, 1972) is an American former professional volleyball player. She was part of the United States women's national volleyball team at the 1998 FIVB Volleyball Women's World Championship in Japan.

== College ==
Rockwell played college volleyball for Penn State from 1991 to 1994 under Russ Rose.

== Coaching ==
After her playing career, Rockwell moved into coaching at Pittsburgh before moving to various other universities.

Rockwell first became an assistant coach for Penn State Nittany Lions women's volleyball team in 2006, a position she held for 2 seasons before joining Texas from 2009 to 2013 as an assistant coach. She then returned to Penn State as associate head coach for the 2015 through 2017 seasons. She retired from collegiate coaching in 2018.

She came out of retirement in January 2022 and was named the seventh head volleyball coach at Notre Dame.

== Broadcasting career ==
Rockwell began broadcasting in 2018 and announces at college and international games. She has broadcast games on ESPN, the Longhorn Network, Fox Sports, and the Big Ten Network.

In 2024, Rockwell was added to NBC's duo of Paul Sunderland and Kevin Barnett for the broadcast coverage of men's and women's indoor volleyball during the 2024 Summer Olympics.

== Head coaching record ==
Record table
Season	Team	Overall	Conference	Standing	Postseason
Notre Dame (Atlantic Coast Conference) (2022–present)
2022	Notre Dame	10–18	5–13	12th	
2023	Notre Dame	11–15	5–13	12th	
2024	Notre Dame	12–17	5–15	T–14th	
2025	Notre Dame	12–16	9–11	T–9th	
Notre Dame:		45–66 (.405)	24–52 (.316)		
Total:		45–66 (.405)			

== See also ==
- List of Pennsylvania State University Olympians
