= Notre Dame Fighting Irish women's volleyball =

College volleyball team

- Founded: 1980; 46 years ago
- University: University of Notre Dame
- Athletic director: Pete Bevacqua
- Head coach: Salima Rockwell (5th season)
- Conference: ACC
- Location: Notre Dame, Indiana, US
- Home arena: Purcell Pavilion (capacity: 9,149)
- Nickname: Fighting Irish
- Colors: Blue and gold

AIAW/NCAA tournament appearance
- 1988, 1992, 1993, 1994, 1995, 1996, 1997, 1998, 1999, 2000, 2001, 2002, 2003, 2004, 2005, 2006, 2009, 2012, 2017, 2019, 2020

Conference tournament champion
- 1986, 1987, 1991, 1992, 1993, 1994, 1995, 1996, 1997, 1998, 2000, 2001, 2002, 2004, 2005

Conference regular season champion
- 1986, 1987, 1991, 1992, 1993, 1994, 1995, 1996, 1997, 1999, 2000, 2001, 2002, 2003, 2004, 2005, 2009

The Notre Dame Fighting Irish women's volleyball team currently competes as part of NCAA Division I, as they are representing the University of Notre Dame in the Atlantic Coast Conference. Notre Dame plays its home games at the Purcell Pavilion.

== History ==
=== Beginnings ===
The Fighting Irish fielded their first volleyball team in 1980 under head coach Sandy Vanslager. The team's first season would finish with a 3–19 record. After a record of 14–22 in their second season, the program's third season in 1982 would show signs of improvement finishing with a record of 25–9. After the 1983 season Vanslager would be replaced as head coach by Art Lambert.

Under coach Lambert In 1986, in just the programs 7th season, they would win the North Star Conference tournament, beating Northern Illinois in the championship game. The program would continue this success by repeating as North Star Conference champions in 1987 and in 1988 making the NCAA Division I women's volleyball tournament where they would beat Penn State in the first round but lose to Illinois in the second round.

=== Glory years ===
Notre Dame hired Debbie Brown, former Arizona State coach, as their next volleyball head coach in 1991. She would immediately show signs of success, finishing as runner ups in the National Invitational Volleyball Championship in her first season.

In just her second season as head coach in 1992, the Fighting Irish won the Horizon League volleyball tournament and made the 1992 NCAA Division I women's volleyball tournament where they would lose to Penn State in the first round.

In Brown's third season in 1993 Notre Dame made the quarterfinals of the 1993 NCAA Division I women's volleyball tournament, getting a first round bye then beating Nebraska and Minnesota before again losing to Penn State.

From 1992 to 2006 Notre Dame made 15 straight NCAA tournament appearances under Debbie Brown and two more in 2009 and 2012.

Debbie Brown was replaced by Jim McLaughlin as head coach in 2015.

=== Modern era ===
Jim McLaughlin resigned in 2018 for health reasons and was replaced by Mike Johnson.

Since 2015, Notre Dame has shown flashes of success, making the NCAA tournament in 2017, 2019, and 2020.

Notre Dame hired Salima Rockwell as their next head coach in 2022.

== Conference membership ==
- Independent (1980–1982)
- North Star Conference (1983–1987)
- Independent (1988–1989)
- Horizon League (1990–1994)
- Big East Conference (1995–2012)
- Atlantic Coast Conference (2013–present)

== Purcell Pavilion ==
Notre Dame volleyball has played at the Purcell Pavilion since their first season in 1980. From 1991 to 2004 they had 74 straight regular-season home wins against conference opponents. The team also recorded 36 consecutive home victories from 2000 to 2002.

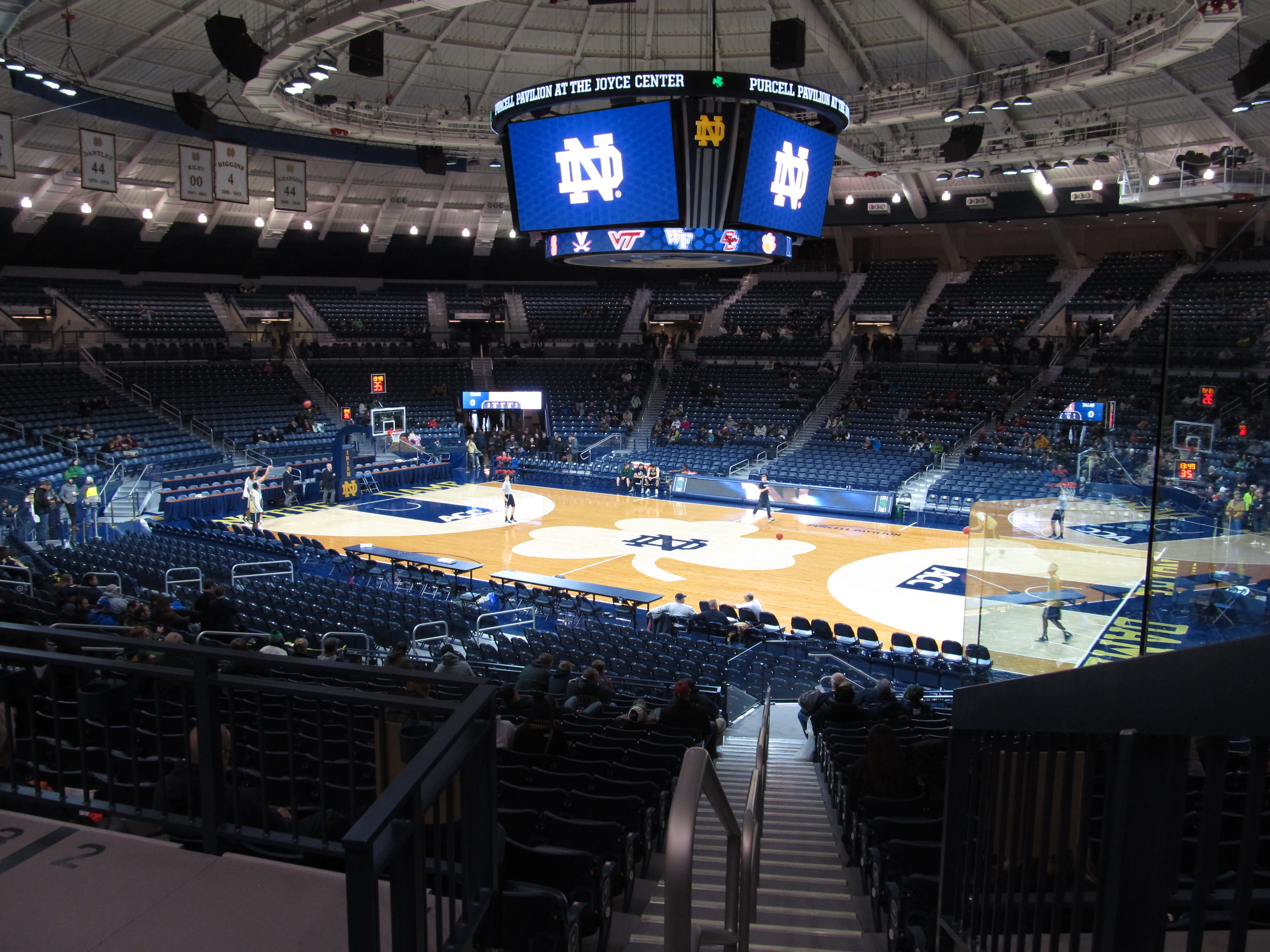
Purcell Pavilion

=== All-time attendance ===
| No. | Date | Opponent | Site | Attendance |
|---|---|---|---|---|
| 1 | November 7, 2003 | Virginia Tech | Purcell Pavilion | 8,643 |
| 2 | November 9, 2007 | Cincinnati | Purcell Pavilion | 7,523 |
| 3 | October 6, 2006 | Marquette | Purcell Pavilion | 5,743 |
| 4 | October 21, 2005 | South Florida | Purcell Pavilion | 5,541 |
| 5 | November 12, 2004 | Pittsburgh | Purcell Pavilion | 4,773 |

== Coaches ==
=== Coaching history ===
Notre Dame volleyball has had 7 head coaches.

| No. | Coach | Tenure | Overall | Achievements |
|---|---|---|---|---|
| 1 | Sandy Vanslager | 1980-83 | 53-80 (.398) | |
| 2 | Art Lambert | 1984-90 | 127-87 (.593) | 1988 NCAA Division I women's volleyball tournament appearance |
| 3 | Maria Perez | 1990 | 4-19 (.174) | |
| 4 | Debbie Brown | 1991-2014 | 519-247 (.678) | 1992, 1993, 1994, 1995, 1996, 1997, 1998, 1999, 2000, 2001, 2002, 2003, 2004, 2005, 2006, 2009, 2012 NCAA Division I women's volleyball tournament appearances |
| 5 | Jim McLaughlin | 2015-2018 | 51-45 (.531) | 2017 NCAA Division I women's volleyball tournament appearance |
| 6 | Mike Johnson | 2018-2021 | 63-44 (.589) | 2019, 2020 NCAA Division I women's volleyball tournament appearances |
| 7 | Salima Rockwell | 2022–present | 21-33 (.389) | |
