= Texas A&M Aggies women's volleyball =

Texas A&M Women's Volleyball Team

- Founded: 1975
- University: Texas A&M University
- Athletic director: Trev Alberts
- Head coach: Jamie Morrison (4th season)
- Conference: SEC
- Location: College Station, Texas, US
- Home Court: Reed Arena
- Nickname: Aggies
- Colors: Maroon and White

NCAA Tournament championships
- 2025

NCAA Tournament Semifinals
- 2025

NCAA Tournament Quarterfinals
- 1999, 2001, 2025

NCAA Tournament Round of 16
- 1981, 1985, 1995, 1997, 1999, 2001, 2003, 2009, 2019, 2024, 2025

NCAA Tournament Round of 32
- 1981, 1985, 1993, 1994, 1995, 1996, 1997, 1998, 1999, 2000, 2001, 2002, 2003, 2004, 2009, 2011, 2012, 2013, 2015, 2019, 2024, 2025

NCAA Tournament appearances
- 1981, 1982, 1985, 1986, 1993, 1994, 1995, 1996, 1997, 1998, 1999, 2000, 2001, 2002, 2003, 2004, 2005, 2009, 2011, 2012, 2013, 2014, 2015, 2016, 2019, 2023, 2024, 2025

Conference regular season champions
- SEC; 2015

The Texas A&M Aggies women's volleyball team represents Texas A&M University in NCAA Division I intercollegiate women's volleyball competition. The Aggies compete in the Southeastern Conference (SEC).

The team began play in 1975. Since then, the Aggies have had seven coaches and have made twenty-seven NCAA tournament appearances.

The longest-serving head coach was Laurie Corbelli, who, during her tenure from 1993 to 2017, oversaw the Aggies' transition from the Southwest Conference (SWC) to the Big 12 Conference in 1996 and later to the Southeastern Conference in 2012. During this time, the Aggies advanced to the Sweet 16 seven times and the Elite 8 two times. Corbelli was named SWC Coach of the Year in 1994 and 1995 and SEC Coach of the Year in 2015.

The current head coach is Jamie Morrison. During Morrison's tenure, the Aggies have made the NCAA tournament in all three years. In 2025, Morrison led the Aggies to the first NCAA championship in program history. Morrison was named AVCA National Coach of the Year in 2025.

== Head coach ==
#	Coach	Years	Seasons	Overall			Conference		
#	Coach	Years	Seasons	Won	Lost	%	Won	Lost	%
1	Laura Kitzmiller	1975-1977, 1979	3	118	44	.728			
2	Dave Schakel	1977–1979	2	68	36	.654			
3	Terry Condon	1980-1985	6	180	49	.786	31	9	.775
4	Al Givens	1986–1992	7	123	122	.502	31	46	.403
5	Laurie Corbelli	1993–2017	25	519	252	.673	290	133	.686
6	Bird Kuhn	2018–2022	5	76	60	.559	44	47	.484
7	Jamie Morrison	2023–Present	3	66	25	.725	32	17	.653
Total			51	1150	588	.662	428	252	.629

== Year-by-year results ==
Legend
National champions
Conference champions
Conference Tournament Champions
Both Regular Season and Tournament Champions

Season	Coach	Conference Record	Overall Record	Notes
Laura Kitzmiller (TAIAW) (1975–1977)
1975	Laura Kitzmiller		27-13	
1976	Laura Kitzmiller		45-11-2	5th State/4th Regionals
1977	Laura Kitzmiller		46-20	3rd State/3rd Regionals/T9th AIAW
Dave Schakel (TAIAW) (1978)
1978	Dave Schakel		50-15	3rd State/1st Regionals/10th AIAW
Dave Schakel/Laura Kitzmiller (TAIAW) (1979)
1979			18-21	6th State/4th Regionals
Terry Condon (TAIAW) (1980–1981)
1980	Terry Condon		24-36	4th State
1981	Terry Condon		40-16	NCAA Sweet 16
Terry Condon (Southwest Conference) (1982–1985)
1982	Terry Condon	8-2	32-13	NCAA 1st Round
1983	Terry Condon	8-2	25-24	
1984	Terry Condon	8-2	33-4	
1985	Terry Condon	7-3	26-8	NCAA Sweet 16
Al Givens (Southwest Conference) (1986–1992)
1986	Al Givens	7-3	23-14	NCAA 1st Round
1987	Al Givens	4-6	15-22	
1988	Al Givens	6-4	18-15	
1989	Al Givens	3-7	12-19	
1990	Al Givens	3-7	18-19	
1991	Al Givens	5-5	18-16	
1992	Al Givens	3-7	19-17	T-5th NIVC
Laurie Corbelli (Southwest Conference) (1993–1995)
1993	Laurie Corbelli	7-3	27-8	NCAA 2nd Round
1994	Laurie Corbelli	6-4	19-14	NCAA 2nd Round
1995	Laurie Corbelli	8-2	23-7	NCAA Sweet 16
Laurie Corbelli (Big 12) (1996–2011)
1996	Laurie Corbelli	15-5	25-8	NCAA 2nd Round
1997	Laurie Corbelli	15-5	26-8	NCAA Sweet 16
1998	Laurie Corbelli	13-7	21-9	NCAA 2nd Round
1999	Laurie Corbelli	16-4	28-6	NCAA Elite 8
2000	Laurie Corbelli	14-6	20-9	NCAA 2nd Round
2001	Laurie Corbelli	16-4	26-6	NCAA Elite 8
2002	Laurie Corbelli	12-8	21-10	NCAA 2nd Round
2003	Laurie Corbelli	13-7	23-10	NCAA Sweet 16
2004	Laurie Corbelli	14-6	19-9	NCAA 2nd Round
2005	Laurie Corbelli	9-11	16-14	NCAA 1st Round
2006	Laurie Corbelli	5-15	12-16	
2007	Laurie Corbelli	10-10	21-10	
2008	Laurie Corbelli	11-9	16-14	
2009	Laurie Corbelli	11-9	20-11	NCAA Sweet 16
2010	Laurie Corbelli	7-13	13-17	
2011	Laurie Corbelli	11-5	23-8	NCAA Second Round
Laurie Corbelli (SEC) (2012–2017)
2012	Laurie Corbelli	16-4	25-6	NCAA 2nd Round
2013	Laurie Corbelli	10-8	19-12	NCAA 2nd Round
2014	Laurie Corbelli	13-5	21-9	NCAA 1st Round
2015	Laurie Corbelli	16-2	24-7	NCAA 2nd Round
2016	Laurie Corbelli	15-3	21-9	NCAA 1st Round
2017	Laurie Corbelli	7-11	10-15	
Bird Kuhn (SEC) (2018–2022)
2018	Bird Kuhn	10-8	17-13	
2019	Bird Kuhn	13-5	23-8	NCAA Sweet 16
2020	Bird Kuhn	9-9	9-9	Cancelled due to COVID-19 pandemic
2021	Bird Kuhn	7-11	14-14	
2022	Bird Kuhn	5-13	13-16	
Jamie Morrison (SEC) (2018–Present)
2023	Jamie Morrison	8-10	16-13	NCAA 1st Round
2024	Jamie Morrison	10-6	21-8	NCAA Sweet 16
2025	Jamie Morrison	14-1	29-4	NCAA National Champions

== Individual Honors ==
=== AVCA All-Americans ===
Player	Team	Year
Sherri Brinkman	Second Team	1984
Sherri Brinkman	Second Team	1985
Stacy Sykora	Second Team	1997
Stacy Sykora	Second Team	1998
Amber Woolsey	First Team	1999
Jenna Moscovic	First Team	2001
Melissa Munsch	Second Team	2003
Melissa Munsch	Third Team	2004
Laura Jones	Second Team	2004
Laura Jones	First Team	2005
Sarah Ammerman	Third Team	2009
Jennifer Banse	Honorable Mention	2009
Kelsey Black	Honorable Mention	2011
Lindsey Miller	Honorable Mention	2011
Lindsey Miller	Honorable Mention	2012
Alisia Kastmo	Honorable Mention	2012
Allie Sawatzky	Honorable Mention	2012
Allie Sawatzky	Honorable Mention	2013
Shelby Sullivan	Honorable Mention	2014
Jazzmin Babers	Honorable Mention	2014
Jazzmin Babers	Second Team	2015
Stephanie Aiple	Honorable Mention	2014
Stephanie Aiple	Honorable Mention	2015
Stephanie Aiple	Honorable Mention	2016
Shelby Sullivan	Honorable Mention	2015
Kaitlyn Blake	Honorable Mention	2016
Hollann Hans	Honorable Mention	2018
Hollann Hans	Second Team	2019
Camille Conner	Honorable Mention	2019
Logan Lednicky	Second Team	2024
Logan Lednicky	Second Team	2025
Ifenna Cos-Okpalla	Honorable Mention	2024
Ifenna Cos-Okpalla	First Team	2025
Kyndal Stowers	Second Team	2025
Maddie Waak	Third Team	2025

=== AVCA National Coach of the Year ===
Year	Recipient
2025	Jamie Morrison

=== Conference Athletes of the Year ===
Player of the Year
Year	Recipient	Conference
2015	Stephanie Aiple	SEC

Freshman of the Year
Year	Recipient	Conference
1994	Kristie Smedsrud	SWC
1998	Jenna Moscovic	Big 12
2002	Laura Jones	Big 12

Defensive Player of the Year
Year	Recipient	Conference
2004	Melissa Munsch	Big 12

Newcomer of the Year
Year	Recipient	Conference
2000	Tara Pulaski	Big 12

=== Conference Coach of the Year ===
Year	Recipient	Conference
1994	Laurie Corbelli	SWC
1995	Laurie Corbelli	SWC
2015	Laurie Corbelli	SEC
2019	Bird Kuhn	SEC

== See also ==
- Texas A&M Aggies
