= Dani Busboom Kelly =

American volleyball player and coach (born 1985)

- Busboom Kelly in 2026

Current position
- Title: Head coach
- Team: Nebraska
- Conference: Big Ten
- Record: 62–1 (.984)
- Annual salary: $725,000

Biographical details
- Born: May 5, 1985 (age 41); Cortland, Nebraska, U.S.

Playing career
- 2003–2006: Nebraska
- Positions: Setter, Libero

Coaching career (HC unless noted)
- 2009–2010: Tennessee (assistant)
- 2011: Louisville (assistant)
- 2012–2016: Nebraska (assistant)
- 2017–2024: Louisville
- 2025–present: Nebraska

Head coaching record
- Overall: 265–45 (.855)
- Tournaments: 26–9 NCAA Division I

Accomplishments and honors

Championships
- 4 ACC (2017, 2020–2022); 2 Big Ten (2025–26)

Awards
- 4x AVCA East Region Coach of the Year (2017, 2020–2022); AVCA West Region Coach of the Year (2025); 3x ACC Coach of the Year (2020–2022); 2x Big Ten Coach of the Year (2025-2026); AVCA Division I National Coach of the Year (2021); AVCA Division I National Assistant Coach of the Year (2016); Volleyball Magazine National Coach of the Year (2021)

Dani Busboom Kelly (born May 5, 1985) is an American former indoor volleyball player and current head coach of the Nebraska Cornhuskers women's volleyball team.

== Early life ==
Busboom Kelly was raised in Cortland, Nebraska and was a multi-star athlete for Freeman High School, as she carried Freeman to a state volleyball title as a freshman, as well as two state basketball championships, and a gold medal in the Class D 100-meter hurdles.

She first caught the attention of Nebraska Cornhuskers head coach John Cook during a Cornhuskers volleyball camp at age 14. While not considered a top prospect at the time, Cook specifically approached her on the final day of the camp; she recalled in a 2023 ESPN story, "He asked to see my hands, which I thought was so weird." The story pointed out that Cook was projecting her as a future setter. While Busboom was intended to leave that day for a softball tournament in Colorado, Cook asked her parents to let her stay through the day's activities. She received an award at the end of the camp, and soon changed her main focus to volleyball.

== Playing career ==
Busboom Kelly played volleyball for the Nebraska cornhuskers from 2003 to 2006, where she played roles as a setter and libero. She was named the Big 12 co-libero of the year and helped her team win the 2006 NCAA Championship as a senior. She concluded her career as one of only two players ranked among the top-10 in Nebraska history in both digs and assists, finishing second on the digs chart with 1,281 and third in career assists with 2,925. Overall, she would help guide Nebraska to a 124–10 record.

Following her playing career with Nebraska, then-head coach Jenny Lang Ping invited her to be on the U.S. national team training roster.

== Coaching career ==
=== Early career ===
After graduation, Busboom initially worked in insurance, but according to ESPN journalist Hallie Grossman, the job "didn't quite take", and she decided to embark on a coaching career. Grossman added that Busboom "was so single-minded in her pursuit that she failed to mention to Lane Kelly -- her husband now and longtime boyfriend then -- that she had applied for an assistant coaching job at Tennessee, at least until she made the final cut."

Busboom Kelly was an assistant coach for the Tennessee Lady Volunteers for the 2009 and 2010 seasons. She guided the team's setters, coordinated travel and equipment needs and ran the school's volleyball camps.

Busboom Kelly spent the 2011 season as an assistant coach at Louisville, where she helped the Cardinals to a 24–9 record and a trip to the second round of the NCAA tournament.

Busboom Kelly joined Nebraska's coaching staff in 2012, where she would spend five seasons as an assistant coach for her alma mater. She became one of few coaches who won the Division I NCAA title as a player and a coach, as Nebraska would win the 2015 NCAA Championship.

=== Louisville ===
In her first season as head coach at Louisville in 2017, she led the Cardinals to the ACC championship, going 18–2 in the league, despite being chosen as eighth place in conference pre-season polls. Busboom Kelly received her first major national award as a head coach when she was named AVCA East Region Coach of the Year. In 2019, Busboom Kelly led the Cardinals to their best NCAA tournament finish in program history, as they advanced to the NCAA Regional finals after upsetting Texas in the Sweet Sixteen.

In 2020, Busboom Kelly led Louisville to another ACC Championship and led the nation in blocks per set and led the league in opponent hitting percentage. Louisville also ranked among the top five in the ACC in hitting percentage (second, .285), kills per set (second, 14.08) and assists per set (12.58). Busboom was named ACC Coach of the Year as well as AVCA East Region Coach of the Year. In 2021, Busboom Kelly led Louisville to its most successful season in school history: Louisville went undefeated in the regular season, they reached a school history high No.1 national ranking in the coaches poll and reached their first NCAA Final Four in school history. As a result of Louisville's successful season, Busboom Kelly was named the ACC Coach of the Year, AVCA National Coach of the Year and Volleyball Magazine National Coach of the Year.

=== Prelude to Nebraska return ===
By winter 2024, Louisville was trying to sign Busboom Kelly to a new contract that would have included what Grossman called a "prohibitive" buyout. Her then-current contract had a similar clause, but Nebraska was specifically exempt from paying a buyout. By that time, Cook, according to Grossman, "saw her as the only coach he wanted to take over Nebraska." Grossman implied that one factor in Cook moving forward his retirement plans was that Busboom Kelly was then expecting her second child. Cook arranged a meeting between her and Nebraska athletic director Troy Dannen in January 2025, coinciding with a previously planned visit by Busboom Kelly to Nebraska for a professional tournament.

=== Nebraska ===
Busboom Kelly was named head coach of the University of Nebraska volleyball team following the retirement of John Cook on January 29, 2025.

== Awards ==
=== Player ===
- Nebraska Single-Season Record Holder (580 Digs in 2006)
- 2006 Big 12 co-Libero of the Year
- 2004 Honorable-Mention AVCA All-Central Region

=== Coach ===
- 2026 Big Ten Coach of the Year
- 2025 AVCA West Region Coach of the Year
- 2025 Big Ten Coach of the Year
- 2022 ACC Coach of the Year
- 2022 AVCA East Region Coach of the Year
- 2021 Volleyball Magazine National Coach of the Year
- 2021 AVCA National Coach of the Year
- 2021 AVCA East Region Coach of the Year
- 2021 ACC Coach of the Year
- 2020 AVCA East Region Coach of the Year
- 2020 ACC Coach of the Year
- 2017 AVCA East Region Coach of the Year

== Head coaching record ==
Record table
Season	Team	Overall	Conference	Standing	Postseason
Louisville Cardinals (Atlantic Coast Conference) (2017–2024)
2017	Louisville	24–7	18–2	T–1st	NCAA first round
2018	Louisville	22–9	14–4	T–3rd	NCAA second round
2019	Louisville	22–10	12–6	T–3rd	NCAA regional final
2020	Louisville	15–3	12–2	1st	NCAA regional semifinal
2021	Louisville	32–1	18–0	1st	NCAA national semifinal
2022	Louisville	31–3	17–1	T–1st	NCAA runner-up
2023	Louisville	27–5	15–3	2nd	NCAA regional final
2024	Louisville	30–6	15–3	T–2nd	NCAA runner-up
Louisville:		203–44 (.822)	121–21 (.852)		
Nebraska Cornhuskers (Big Ten Conference) (2025–present)
2025	Nebraska	33–1	20–0	1st	NCAA regional final
2026	Nebraska	29–0	17–0	1st	
Nebraska:		62–1 (.984)	37–0 (1.000)		
Total:		265–45 (.855)			
National champion Postseason invitational champion Conference regular season champion Conference regular season and conference tournament champion Division regular season champion Division regular season and conference tournament champion Conference tournament champion
