= 1993 NCAA Division I women's volleyball tournament =

Volleyball competition

1993 NCAA women's Division I volleyball tournament
- 1993 NCAA Final Four logo
- Champions: Long Beach State (2nd NCAA (4th national) title)
- Runner-up: Penn State (1st title match)
- Semifinalists: BYU (1st Final Four); Florida (2nd Final Four)
- Winning coach: Brian Gimmillaro (2nd title)
- Final Four All-Tournament Team: Nichelle Burton (Long Beach State); Danielle Scott (Long Beach State); Salima Davidson (Penn State); Jen Reimers (Penn State); Zeynep Ton (Penn State); Charlene Johnson (BYU)

The 1993 NCAA Division I women's volleyball tournament began with 48 teams and ended on December 18, 1993, when Long Beach State defeated Penn State 3 games to 1 in the NCAA championship match.

Long Beach State won the program's second NCAA title. Led by Nichelle Burton's 28 kills and AVCA National Player of the Year Danielle Scott's 21 kills, the 49ers defeated Penn State 15–13, 12–15, 15–11, 16–14.

The NCAA's expansion of 32 tournament teams to 48 tournament teams began in 1993.

== Records ==
West Regional
Seed	School	Conference	Berth Type	Record
	Arizona	Pac-10	At-large	18-10
3	Arizona State	Pac-10	At-large	20-7
2	BYU	WAC	Automatic	26-2
	Lamar	Sun Belt	Automatic	24-11
	New Mexico	WAC	At-large	17-10
	Radford	Big South	Automatic	25-10
	San Diego	West Coast	At-large	24-5
	Santa Clara	West Coast	Automatic	22-9
4	Stanford	Pac-10	At-large	21-6
1	UCLA	Pac-10	Automatic	28-1
	USC	Pac-10	At-large	21-8
	Washington State	Pac-10	At-large	20-10

Northwest Regional
Seed	School	Conference	Berth Type	Record
	Appalachian State	Southern	Automatic	25-12
	DePaul	Great Midwest	Automatic	22-13
	Florida State	ACC	At-large	23-9
	George Washington	Atlantic 10	Automatic	27-7
2	Hawaii	Big West	At-large	17-10
	Idaho	Big Sky	Automatic	23-5
1	Long Beach State	Big West	Auto (shared)	27-2
4	Ohio State	Big Ten	At-large	23-5
3	Pacific	Big West	At-large	20-9
	Pittsburgh	Big East	Automatic	23-9
	South Florida	Metro	At-large	23-6
	Wisconsin	Big Ten	At-large	18-12

Mideast Regional
Seed	School	Conference	Berth Type	Record
	Ball State	Mid-American	Automatic	26-4
2	Colorado	Big Eight	Automatic	25-5
	Cornell	Ivy League	Automatic	17-9
	Illinois	Big Ten	At-large	17-12
	Illinois State	Missouri Valley	At-large	21-10
	Minnesota	Big Ten	At-large	22-9
	Nebraska	Big Eight	At-large	24-5
	Northern Illinois	Mid-Continent	Automatic	28-5
4	Notre Dame	Midwestern Collegiate	Automatic	25-5
3	Penn State	Big Ten	Automatic	27-3
	Southwest Missouri State	Missouri Valley	Automatic	22-7
1	UC Santa Barbara	Big West	Auto (shared)	28-3

South Regional
Seed	School	Conference	Berth Type	Record
	Clemson	ACC	At-large	27-7
	Duke	ACC	Automatic	28-2
2	Florida	SEC	Automatic	30-3
	George Mason	CAA	Automatic	28-4
3	Georgia	SEC	At-large	28-5
	Houston	Southwest	At-large	19-15
4	Kentucky	SEC	At-large	29-3
	Louisville	Metro	Automatic	23-12
	Sam Houston State	Southland	Automatic	25-7
	Tennessee	SEC	At-large	17-12
1	Texas	Southwest	Automatic	29-2
	Texas A&M	Southwest	At-large	26-7

== Brackets ==
=== West regional ===
First round
New Mexico	3
Santa Clara	0
Southern California	3
Radford	0
Arizona	3
Lamar	0
San Diego	1
Washington State	3

Second round
1	UCLA	3
New Mexico	1
Southern California	1
4	Stanford	3
3	Arizona State	2
Arizona	3
Washington State	1
2	BYU	3

Regional semifinal
1	UCLA	3
4	Stanford	1
Arizona	0
2	BYU	3

Regional final
1	UCLA	0
2	BYU	3

=== Mideast regional ===
First round
Minnesota	3
Ball State	0
Nebraska	3
Cornell	0
Northern Illinois	3
Illinois State	0
Illinois	3
Southwest Missouri State	0

Second round
1	UCSB	2
Minnesota	3
Nebraska	0
4	Notre Dame	3
3	Penn State	3
Northern Illinois	0
Illinois	0
2	Colorado	3

Regional semifinal
Minnesota	2
4	Notre Dame	3
3	Penn State	3
2	Colorado	2

Regional final
4	Notre Dame	0
3	Penn State	3

=== Northwest regional ===
First round
Pittsburgh	2
George Washington	3
Idaho	3
Appalachian State	0
Florida State	3
DePaul	1
Wisconsin	3
South Florida	0

Second round
1	Long Beach State	3
George Washington	0
Idaho	1
4	Ohio State	3
3	Pacific	3
Florida State	1
Wisconsin	0
2	Hawaiʻi	3

Regional semifinal
1	Long Beach State	3
4	Ohio State	1
3	Pacific	1
2	Hawaiʻi	3

Regional final
1	Long Beach State	3
2	Hawaiʻi	0

=== South regional ===
First round
Texas A&M	3
George Mason	1
Duke	3
Louisville	0
Sam Houston State	1
Tennessee	3
Clemson	0
Houston	3

Second round
1	Texas	3
Texas A&M	0
Duke	3
4	Kentucky	0
3	Georgia	3
Tennessee	1
Houston	0
2	Florida	3

Regional semifinal
1	Texas	3
Duke	0
3	Georgia	0
2	Florida	3

Regional final
1	Texas	2
2	Florida	3

== Final Four - UW Field House, Madison, Wisconsin ==
National semifinals
2	BYU	1
3	Penn State	3
1	Long Beach State	3
2	Florida	0

National championship
3	Penn State	1
1	Long Beach State	3
