= L&N Federal Credit Union Arena =

Soccer stadium at the University of Louisville

Coordinates: 38°13′4.66″N 85°45′17.14″W

- L&N Arena
- Interactive map of L&N Federal Credit Union Arena
- Full name: L&N Federal Credit Union Arena
- Former names: Cardinal Arena
- Address: 2100 S Floyd St
- Location: Louisville, Kentucky
- Owner: University of Louisville
- Operator: University of Louisville Athletic Department
- Capacity: Volleyball: 1,331

Construction
- Groundbreaking: 1990
- Opened: 1991; 35 years ago
- Renovated: Summer 2017

Tenant
- Louisville Cardinals women's volleyball (1990-2011, 2017–present)

Website
- gocards.com/facilities/l&n-federal-credit-union-arena/3

L&N Federal Credit Union Arena is a volleyball-only arena in Louisville, Kentucky. The stadium was built for the University of Louisville Cardinals team.

== History ==
L&N Arena opened in 1991 as Cardinal Arena and was constructed as part of the larger Swain Student Activities Center building. It served as the main home of the Louisville women's volleyball team until 2011 when the team started playing in the KFC Yum! Center part-time. The team moved there permanently in 2012.

In the summer of 2017, Cardinal Arena received $600,000 in renovations. The Louisville volleyball team made the arena their home again starting that season.

In April 2019, L&N Federal Credit Union gifted $2 million to rename the area to L&N Federal Credit Union Arena.
