= 2025 NCAA Division I women's volleyball tournament =

Volleyball competition

2025 NCAA women's Division I volleyball tournament
- 2025 NCAA Division I Women's Volleyball Championship
- Finals site: T-Mobile Center; Kansas City, Missouri
- Champions: Texas A&M (1st title)
- Runner-up: Kentucky (2nd title match)
- Semifinalists: Pittsburgh (5th Final Four); Wisconsin (7th Final Four)
- Winning coach: Jamie Morrison (1st title)
- Most outstanding player: Kyndal Stowers (Texas A&M)
- Final Four All-Tournament Team: Ifenna Cos-Okpalla (Texas A&M); Logan Lednicky (Texas A&M); Ava Underwood (Texas A&M); Eva Hudson (Kentucky); Olivia Babcock (Pittsburgh)

The 2025 NCAA Division I women's volleyball tournament was a single-elimination tournament with 64 teams that determined the National Collegiate Athletic Association (NCAA) Division I women's volleyball national champion for the 2025 season. It was the 45th edition of the tournament. It started on December 4, 2025 on various college campuses across the United States, location determinations were chosen based on participating teams seedings. The tournament concluded with the championship game from T-Mobile Center in Kansas City, Missouri on December 21, 2025, when Texas A&M swept Kentucky 3–0 to win the program's first NCAA title.

Nebraska, who went undefeated in the regular season for the first time since the program won the 2000 NCAA championship, earned the #1 overall seed, while Kentucky, Texas, and Pittsburgh rounded out the top-4 overall seeds. All four teams defeated their first and second round opponents, allowing them to host the regional rounds. The 2024 defending NCAA national champions Penn State was denied a chance at a repeat, as they were defeated in the second round by Texas. Penn State remains to be the only NCAA Division I women's volleyball program to earn a bid to all 45 NCAA Tournaments since its the inception in 1981.

The top four regional seeds advanced to the regional semifinals in all regions with the exception of the Kentucky regional, which saw unseeded Cal Poly advance after upsetting fourth-seeded Southern California in the second round. All number 1 and 3 seeds advanced to the regional finals. Texas A&M completed arguably the biggest upset of the 2025 season when it defeated top-ranked and then-undefeated Nebraska to advance to the program's first ever final four. In the other regionals, Pittsburgh advanced to the program's fifth-straight final four, while Wisconsin and Kentucky also advanced after defeating Texas and Creighton, respectively.

In the final four, Texas A&M continued their tournament run and defeated Pittsburgh in 3 sets, knocking out another #1 seed to advance to the program's first ever championship match. In the second semifinal, Wisconsin and Kentucky battled in a close match, with Kentucky prevailing 3–2. The wins guaranteed an all-SEC final for the first time in NCAA tournament history.

In the national championship match, Texas A&M swept Kentucky in three sets to win the program's first NCAA volleyball title in school history, becoming the second SEC school to earn a title after Kentucky in 2020. The 2025 American Volleyball Coaches Association (AVCA) National Coach of the Year, Jamie Morrison, won his first NCAA title as a coach with the win.

== Tournament schedule and venues ==
2025 NCAA First and Second Round venues

First and Second Rounds (Subregionals)
Hosted by the top 16 overall tournament seeds

- December 4–6
  - Bob Devaney Sports Center, Lincoln, Nebraska (Host: University of Nebraska–Lincoln)
  - Memorial Coliseum, Lexington, Kentucky (Host: University of Kentucky)
  - Gregory Gymnasium, Austin, Texas (Host: University of Texas)
  - Petersen Events Center, Pittsburgh, Pennsylvania (Host: University of Pittsburgh)
  - Moody Coliseum, Dallas, TX (Host: Southern Methodist University)
  - Maples Pavilion, Palo Alto, California (Host: Stanford University)
  - Desert Financial Arena, Tempe, Arizona (Host: Arizona State University)
  - L&N Federal Credit Union Arena, Louisville, Kentucky (Host: University of Louisville)
  - Reed Arena, College Station, TX (Host: Texas A&M University)
  - Sokol Arena, Omaha, Nebraska (Host: Creighton University)
  - UW Field House, Madison, Wisconsin (Host: University of Wisconsin)
  - Holloway Gymnasium, West Lafayette, Indiana (Host: Purdue University)
  - Maturi Pavilion, Minneapolis, Minnesota (Host: University of Minnesota)
  - Wilkinson Hall, Bloomington, Indiana (Host: Indiana University)
  - Galen Center, Los Angeles, California (Host: University of Southern California)
  - Horejsi Family Volleyball Arena, Lawrence, Kansas (Host: University of Kansas)

Regional semifinals and finals

2025 NCAA Regionals and Final Four
- December 11–14
  - Lincoln Regional, Bob Devaney Sports Center, Lincoln, Nebraska (Host: University of Nebraska–Lincoln)
  - Lexington Regional, Memorial Coliseum, Lexington, Kentucky (Host: University of Kentucky)
  - Austin Regional, Gregory Gymnasium, Austin, Texas (Host: University of Texas)
  - Pittsburgh Regional, Petersen Events Center, Pittsburgh, Pennsylvania (Host: University of Pittsburgh)

National semifinals and championship

- December 18 & 21
  - T-Mobile Center, Kansas City, Missouri (Hosts: University of Kansas and Kansas City Sports Commission)

== Qualifying teams ==
=== Automatic qualifiers ===
Teams who won their conference championships automatically qualify

Automatic qualifiers in the 2025 NCAA Division I women's volleyball tournament
Conference	Team
America East	UMBC
American	Tulsa
ACC	Stanford
ASUN	Central Arkansas
Atlantic 10	Loyola Chicago
Big East	Creighton
Big Sky	Northern Colorado
Big South	High Point
Big Ten	Nebraska
Big 12	Arizona State
Big West	Cal Poly
CAA	Campbell
CUSA	Western Kentucky
Horizon	Wright State
Ivy League	Princeton
MAAC	Fairfield
MAC	Toledo
MEAC	Coppin State
Missouri Valley	Northern Iowa
Mountain West	Utah State
NEC	LIU
Ohio Valley	Eastern Illinois
Patriot	American
SEC	Kentucky
Southern	Wofford
Southland	Stephen F. Austin
SWAC	Florida A&M
Summit	St. Thomas (MN)
Sun Belt	Arkansas State
WAC	Utah Valley
WCC	San Diego

=== Tournament seeds ===
Lincoln, NE Regional
Seed	RPI	School	Conference	Berth type	Record
1	1	Nebraska	Big Ten	Automatic	30–0
2	9	Louisville	ACC	At–Large	24–6
3	10	Texas A&M	SEC	At–Large	23–4
4	15	Kansas	Big 12	At–Large	22–10
5	19	Miami (FL)	ACC	At–Large	26–5
6	20	TCU	Big 12	At–Large	20–10
7	27	Western Kentucky	CUSA	Automatic	27–5
8	30	San Diego	WCC	Automatic	25–4
	240	LIU	NEC	Automatic	20–8
	34	Kansas State	Big 12	At–Large	17–9
	36	Tulsa	American	At–Large	25–6
	83	High Point	Big South	Automatic	18–9
	107	Campbell	CAA	Automatic	23–6
	64	Stephen F. Austin	Southland	Automatic	23–7
	33	Marquette	Big East	At–Large	17–10
	114	Loyola Chicago	Atlantic 10	Automatic	17–15

Pittsburgh, PA Regional
Seed	RPI	School	Conference	Berth type	Record
1	5	Pittsburgh	ACC	At–Large	26–4
2	8	SMU	ACC	At–Large	25–5
3	12	Purdue	Big Ten	At–Large	24–6
4	14	Minnesota	Big Ten	At–Large	22–9
5	26	Iowa State	Big 12	At–Large	22–7
6	28	Baylor	Big 12	At–Large	17–9
7	21	Rice	American	Automatic	21–9
8	22	Xavier	Big East	At–Large	26–4
	109	Central Arkansas	ASUN	Automatic	18–11
	38	Florida	SEC	At–Large	15–11
	50	Arkansas State	Sun Belt	Automatic	22–8
	115	Wright State	Horizon	Automatic	21–10
	100	Fairfield	MAAC	Automatic	25–5
	71	St. Thomas (MN)	Summit	Automatic	21–9
	45	Michigan	Big Ten	At–Large	21–10
	176	UMBC	America East	Automatic	13–11

Austin, TX Regional
Seed	RPI	School	Conference	Berth type	Record
1	2	Texas	SEC	At–Large	23–3
2	7	Stanford	ACC	Automatic	27–4
3	11	Wisconsin	Big Ten	At–Large	24–4
4	18	Indiana	Big Ten	At–Large	23–7
5	24	Colorado	Big 12	At–Large	22–8
6	16	UTEP	CUSA	At–Large	25–4
7	31	South Dakota State	Summit	At–Large	23–4
8	32	Penn State	Big Ten	At–Large	18–12
	281	Florida A&M	SWAC	Automatic	14–16
	40	USF	American	At–Large	17–12
	60	American	Patriot	Automatic	24–4
	96	Toledo	MAC	Automatic	23–10
	111	Eastern Illinois	OVC	Automatic	24–7
	49	North Carolina	ACC	At–Large	21–8
	42	Arizona	Big 12	At–Large	16–12
	122	Utah Valley	WAC	Automatic	16–10

Lexington, KY Regional
Seed	RPI	School	Conference	Berth type	Record
1	3	Kentucky	SEC	Automatic	25–2
2	4	Arizona State	Big 12	Automatic	26–3
3	6	Creighton	Big East	Automatic	25–5
4	13	Southern California	Big Ten	At–Large	24–6
5	17	BYU	Big 12	At–Large	22–8
6	25	UNI	MVC	Automatic	25–5
7	23	Tennessee	SEC	At–Large	20–7
8	35	UCLA	Big Ten	At–Large	18–12
	205	Coppin State	MEAC	Automatic	23–11
	29	Utah State	Mountain West	Automatic	23–7
	39	Utah	Big 12	At–Large	15–14
	101	Northern Colorado	Big Sky	Automatic	17–15
	85	Princeton	Ivy League	Automatic	18–6
	54	Cal Poly	Big West	Automatic	25–7
	41	Georgia Tech	ACC	At–Large	16–13
	134	Wofford	SoCon	Automatic	17–13

RPI as of Nov. 30 2025

== Bracket ==
=== Lincoln, NE Regional ===
First Round; December 4 & 5
1	Nebraska	3
LIU	0
Lincoln, NE
Kansas State	3
8	San Diego	2
5	Miami (FL)	3
Tulsa	1
Lawrence, KS
High Point	0
4	Kansas	3
3	Texas A&M	3
Campbell	0
College Station, TX
Stephen F. Austin	0
6	TCU	3
7	Western Kentucky	0
Marquette	3
Louisville, KY
Loyola Chicago	0
2	Louisville	3

Second Round; December 5 & 6
1	Nebraska	3
Kansas State	0
5	Miami (FL)	1
4	Kansas	3
3	Texas A&M	3
6	TCU	1
Marquette	2
2	Louisville	3

Regional Semifinals; December 12
1	Nebraska	3
4	Kansas	0
3	Texas A&M	3
2	Louisville	2

Regional Finals; December 14
1	Nebraska	2
3	Texas A&M	3

==== Schedule ====
===== First Round =====
December 5, 2025; 07:00 PM CST	(1) Nebraska	3-0	LIU	Bob Devaney Sports Center, Lincoln, NE; Attendance: 8,656
December 5, 2025; 07:00 PM CST	(25-11, 25-15, 25-17); Report			Bob Devaney Sports Center, Lincoln, NE; Attendance: 8,656

December 5, 2025; 04:30 PM CST	Kansas State	3-2	(8) San Diego	Bob Devaney Sports Center, Lincoln, NE; Attendance: 0
December 5, 2025; 04:30 PM CST	(21-25, 25-17, 26-28, 25-22, 15-12); Report			Bob Devaney Sports Center, Lincoln, NE; Attendance: 0

December 4, 2025; 04:00 PM CST	(5) Miami (FL)	3–1	Tulsa	Horejsi Family Volleyball Arena, Lawrence, KS; Attendance: 0 Referees: Marty Prochko, Joe Gustafson, Anthony White, Ken Corum
December 4, 2025; 04:00 PM CST	(25–22, 13–25, 25–22, 25–20); Report			Horejsi Family Volleyball Arena, Lawrence, KS; Attendance: 0 Referees: Marty Prochko, Joe Gustafson, Anthony White, Ken Corum

December 4, 2025; 06:30 PM CST	High Point	0–3	(4) Kansas	Horejsi Family Volleyball Arena, Lawrence, KS; Attendance: 1,607; Referees: Rachel Kirk, Brett Myers, Kayla Stevenson, Joe Gustafson
December 4, 2025; 06:30 PM CST	(20–25, 15–25, 18–25); Report			Horejsi Family Volleyball Arena, Lawrence, KS; Attendance: 1,607; Referees: Rachel Kirk, Brett Myers, Kayla Stevenson, Joe Gustafson

December 5, 2025; 05:30 PM CST	(3) Texas A&M	3-0	Campbell	Reed Arena, College Station, TX; Attendance: 5,830
December 5, 2025; 05:30 PM CST	(25-20, 25-10, 25-13); Report			Reed Arena, College Station, TX; Attendance: 5,830

December 5, 2025; 04:00 PM CST	Stephen F. Austin	0-3	(6) TCU	Reed Arena, College Station, TX; Attendance: 3,500; Referees: Thang Nguyen, Richard Bleau, John Stadnick, Thomas Walkoviak
December 5, 2025; 04:00 PM CST	(8-25, 24-26, 20-25); Report			Reed Arena, College Station, TX; Attendance: 3,500; Referees: Thang Nguyen, Richard Bleau, John Stadnick, Thomas Walkoviak

December 5, 2025; 03:00 PM CST	(7) Western Kentucky	0–3	Marquette	L&N Federal Credit Union Arena, Louisville, KY; Attendance: 1,181; Referees: Bill Thornburgh, Carla Bunner, Jake Rasmussen, Logan Greer
December 5, 2025; 03:00 PM CST	(22–25, 21–25, 16–25); Report			L&N Federal Credit Union Arena, Louisville, KY; Attendance: 1,181; Referees: Bill Thornburgh, Carla Bunner, Jake Rasmussen, Logan Greer

December 5, 2025; 05:30 PM CST	Loyola Chicago	0-3	(2) Louisville	L&N Federal Credit Union Arena, Louisville, KY; Attendance: 1,181
December 5, 2025; 05:30 PM CST	(17-25, 9-25, 12-25); Report			L&N Federal Credit Union Arena, Louisville, KY; Attendance: 1,181

===== Second Round =====
December 6, 2025; 07:00 PM CST	(1) Nebraska	3-0	Kansas State	Bob Devaney Sports Center, Lincoln, NE; Attendance: 8,601
December 6, 2025; 07:00 PM CST	(25-17, 25-21, 25-16)			Bob Devaney Sports Center, Lincoln, NE; Attendance: 8,601

December 6, 2025; 04:00 PM CST	(5) Miami (FL)	1-3	(4) Kansas	Horejsi Family Volleyball Arena, Lawrence, KS; Attendance: 1,797
December 6, 2025; 04:00 PM CST	(17-25, 22-25, 25-22, 25-27)			Horejsi Family Volleyball Arena, Lawrence, KS; Attendance: 1,797

December 6, 2025; 7:00 PM CST	(3) Texas A&M	3-1	(6) TCU	Reed Arena, College Station, TX; Attendance: 5,354
December 6, 2025; 7:00 PM CST	(23-25, 25-22, 25-23, 29-27)			Reed Arena, College Station, TX; Attendance: 5,354

December 6, 2025; 03:00 PM CST	Marquette	2-3	(2) Louisville	L&N Federal Credit Union Arena, Louisville, KY; Attendance: 1,098
December 6, 2025; 03:00 PM CST	(25-21, 11-25, 25-23, 19-25, 12-15)			L&N Federal Credit Union Arena, Louisville, KY; Attendance: 1,098

===== Regional Semifinals =====
December 12, 2025; 8:30 p.m. CST	(1) Nebraska	3–0	(4) Kansas	Bob Devaney Sports Center, Lincoln, NE; Attendance: 8,800; Referees: Jim Kuziela, Paula Martin, Sarah Myres, Anthony White
December 12, 2025; 8:30 p.m. CST	(25–12, 25–11, 25–12)			Bob Devaney Sports Center, Lincoln, NE; Attendance: 8,800; Referees: Jim Kuziela, Paula Martin, Sarah Myres, Anthony White

December 12, 2025; 6:00 p.m. CST	(3) Texas A&M	3–2	(2) Louisville	Bob Devaney Sports Center, Lincoln, NE; Attendance: 0
December 12, 2025; 6:00 p.m. CST	(23–25, 22–25, 25–23, 25–18, 15–13)			Bob Devaney Sports Center, Lincoln, NE; Attendance: 0

===== Regional Final =====
December 14, 2025; 2:00 PM CST	(1) Nebraska	2–3	(3) Texas A&M	Bob Devaney Sports Center, Lincoln, NE; Attendance: 8,650; Referees: Jim Kuziela, Brian Hemelgarn, Sarah Myres, Nathan Wagner
December 14, 2025; 2:00 PM CST	(22–25, 22–25, 25–20, 37–35, 13–15)			Bob Devaney Sports Center, Lincoln, NE; Attendance: 8,650; Referees: Jim Kuziela, Brian Hemelgarn, Sarah Myres, Nathan Wagner

==== Region All-Tournament Team ====
- Logan Lednicky (Most Outstanding Player) – Texas A&M
- Kyndal Stowers – Texas A&M
- Ava Underwood – Texas A&M
- Maddie Waak – Texas A&M
- Rebekah Allick – Nebraska
- Harper Murray – Nebraska
- Chloe Chicoine – Louisville

=== Pittsburgh, PA Regional ===
First Round; December 4 & 5
2	SMU	3
Central Arkansas	0
University Park, TX
Florida	3
7	Rice	0
6	Baylor	3
Arkansas State	2
West Lafayette, IN
Wright State	0
3	Purdue	3
4	Minnesota	3
Fairfield	0
Minneapolis, MN
St. Thomas (MN)	2
5	Iowa State	3
8	Xavier	0
Michigan	3
Pittsburgh, PA
UMBC	0
1	Pittsburgh	3

Second Round; December 5 & 6
2	SMU	3
Florida	0
6	Baylor	1
3	Purdue	3
4	Minnesota	3
5	Iowa State	0
Michigan	0
1	Pittsburgh	3

Regional Semifinals; December 11
2	SMU	1
3	Purdue	3
4	Minnesota	0
1	Pittsburgh	3

Regional Finals; December 13
3	Purdue	1
1	Pittsburgh	3

==== Schedule ====
===== First Round =====
December 5, 2025; 06:30 PM CST	(2) SMU	3–0	Central Arkansas	Moody Coliseum, University Park, TX; Attendance: 2,028
December 5, 2025; 06:30 PM CST	(25–13, 25–13, 25–13); Report			Moody Coliseum, University Park, TX; Attendance: 2,028

December 5, 2025; 04:00 PM CST	Florida	3–0	(7) Rice	Moody Coliseum, University Park, TX; Attendance: 2,028; Referees: Michele Prater, Carlos Tamez, Blaine Halberstadt, Bryce Estes
December 5, 2025; 04:00 PM CST	(27–25, 25–23, 25–19); Report			Moody Coliseum, University Park, TX; Attendance: 2,028; Referees: Michele Prater, Carlos Tamez, Blaine Halberstadt, Bryce Estes

December 4, 2025; 04:30 PM CST	(6) Baylor	3–2	Arkansas State	Holloway Gymnasium, West Lafayette, IN; Attendance: 2,415; Referees: Suzanne Lowry, Drew Puckrin, Brian Hemelgarn, Jeff Morris
December 4, 2025; 04:30 PM CST	(23–25, 25–20, 30–28, 23–25, 15–10); Report			Holloway Gymnasium, West Lafayette, IN; Attendance: 2,415; Referees: Suzanne Lowry, Drew Puckrin, Brian Hemelgarn, Jeff Morris

December 4, 2025; 06:00 PM CST	Wright State	0–3	(3) Purdue	Holloway Gymnasium, West Lafayette, IN; Attendance: 2,415; Referees: EJ Swartz, Brian Hemelgarn, Drew Puckrin, John Rodewald
December 4, 2025; 06:00 PM CST	(13–25, 21–25, 19–25); Report			Holloway Gymnasium, West Lafayette, IN; Attendance: 2,415; Referees: EJ Swartz, Brian Hemelgarn, Drew Puckrin, John Rodewald

December 5, 2025; 07:00 PM CST	(4) Minnesota	3–0	Fairfield	Maturi Pavilion, Minneapolis, MN; Attendance: 4,341
December 5, 2025; 07:00 PM CST	(25–12, 25–7, 25–13); Report			Maturi Pavilion, Minneapolis, MN; Attendance: 4,341

December 5, 2025; 04:30 PM CST	St. Thomas (MN)	2–3	(5) Iowa State	Maturi Pavilion, Minneapolis, MN; Attendance: 4,341
December 5, 2025; 04:30 PM CST	(25–21, 13–25, 16–25, 25–21, 8–15); Report			Maturi Pavilion, Minneapolis, MN; Attendance: 4,341

December 5, 2025; 03:00 PM CST	(8) Xavier	0–3	Michigan	Petersen Events Center, Pittsburgh, PA; Attendance: 3,985; Referees: Mara Wayer, Jeff McKinney, Shera Moxley, Lawrence Walden
December 5, 2025; 03:00 PM CST	(19–25, 15–25, 23–25); Report			Petersen Events Center, Pittsburgh, PA; Attendance: 3,985; Referees: Mara Wayer, Jeff McKinney, Shera Moxley, Lawrence Walden

December 5, 2025; 05:30 PM CST	UMBC	0–3	(1) Pittsburgh	Petersen Events Center, Pittsburgh, PA; Attendance: 4,240
December 5, 2025; 05:30 PM CST	(10–25, 17–25, 13–25); Report			Petersen Events Center, Pittsburgh, PA; Attendance: 4,240

===== Second Round =====
December 6, 2025; 06:30 PM CST	(2) SMU	3–0	Florida	Moody Coliseum, University Park, TX; Attendance: 1,977
December 6, 2025; 06:30 PM CST	(25–11, 25–21, 26–24); Report			Moody Coliseum, University Park, TX; Attendance: 1,977

December 5, 2025; 04:30 PM CST	(6) Baylor	1–3	(3) Purdue	Holloway Gymnasium, West Lafayette, IN; Attendance: 1,808
December 5, 2025; 04:30 PM CST	(16–25, 19–25, 25–23, 20–25); Report			Holloway Gymnasium, West Lafayette, IN; Attendance: 1,808

December 6, 2025; 07:00 PM CST	(4) Minnesota	3-0	(5) Iowa State	Maturi Pavilion, Minneapolis, MN; Attendance: 3,517
December 6, 2025; 07:00 PM CST	(25–22, 25–21, 25–14); Report			Maturi Pavilion, Minneapolis, MN; Attendance: 3,517

December 6, 2025; 03:00 PM CST	Michigan	0–3	(1) Pittsburgh	Petersen Events Center, Pittsburgh, PA; Attendance: 4,149
December 6, 2025; 03:00 PM CST	(23–25, 23–25, 18–25); Report			Petersen Events Center, Pittsburgh, PA; Attendance: 4,149

===== Regional Semifinals =====
December 11, 2025; 8:30 p.m. CST	(2) SMU	1–3	(3) Purdue	Petersen Events Center, Pittsburgh, PA; Attendance: 4,624
December 11, 2025; 8:30 p.m. CST	(25–16, 19–25, 22–25, 27–29); Report			Petersen Events Center, Pittsburgh, PA; Attendance: 4,624

December 11, 2025; 6:00 p.m. CST	(4) Minnesota	0–3	(1) Pittsburgh	Petersen Events Center, Pittsburgh, PA; Attendance: 4,624
December 11, 2025; 6:00 p.m. CST	(16–25, 23–25, 22–25); Report			Petersen Events Center, Pittsburgh, PA; Attendance: 4,624

===== Regional Final =====
December 13, 2025; 6:30 p.m. CST	(3) Purdue	1–3	(1) Pittsburgh	Petersen Events Center, Pittsburgh, PA; Attendance: 4,517; Referees: Devonie McLarty, Robyn Courchane, Scott Prox, Christy Alltop
December 13, 2025; 6:30 p.m. CST	(22–25, 21–25, 25–22, 17–25); Report			Petersen Events Center, Pittsburgh, PA; Attendance: 4,517; Referees: Devonie McLarty, Robyn Courchane, Scott Prox, Christy Alltop

==== Region All-Tournament Team ====
- Olivia Babcock (Most Outstanding Player) – Pittsburgh
- Brooke Mosher – Pittsburgh
- Marina Pezelj – Pittsburgh
- Kenna Wollard – Purdue
- Akasha Anderson – Purdue
- Ryan McAleer – Purdue
- Malaya Jones – SMU

=== Austin, TX Regional ===
First Round; December 4 & 5
1	Texas	3
Florida A&M	0
Austin, TX
USF	1
8	Penn State	3
5	Colorado	3
American	0
Bloomington, IN
Toledo	0
4	Indiana	3
3	Wisconsin	3
Eastern Illinois	0
Madison, WI
North Carolina	3
6	UTEP	1
7	South Dakota State	1
Arizona	3
Palo Alto, CA
Utah Valley	1
2	Stanford	3

Second Round; December 5 & 6
1	Texas	3
8	Penn State	0
5	Colorado	0
4	Indiana	3
3	Wisconsin	3
North Carolina	0
Arizona	1
2	Stanford	3

Regional Semifinals; December 12
1	Texas	3
4	Indiana	0
3	Wisconsin	3
2	Stanford	1

Regional Finals; December 14
1	Texas	1
3	Wisconsin	3

==== Schedule ====
===== First Round =====
December 5, 2025; 07:00 PM CST	(1) Texas	3-0	Florida A&M	Gregory Gymnasium, Austin, TX; Attendance: 3,947
December 5, 2025; 07:00 PM CST	(11-25, 8-25, 14-25); Report			Gregory Gymnasium, Austin, TX; Attendance: 3,947

December 5, 2025; 05:30 PM CST	USF	1-3	(8) Penn State	Gregory Gymnasium, Austin, TX; Attendance: 1,200
December 5, 2025; 05:30 PM CST	(23-25, 25-12, 21-25, 19-25); Report			Gregory Gymnasium, Austin, TX; Attendance: 1,200

December 4, 2025; 02:00 PM CST	(5) Colorado	3–0	American	Wilkinson Hall, Bloomington, IN; Attendance: 647; Referees: Bev Reac, Wad DuBois, Geraldo Dominguez-Diaz, Shane White
December 4, 2025; 02:00 PM CST	(25–16, 25–19, 25–16); Report			Wilkinson Hall, Bloomington, IN; Attendance: 647; Referees: Bev Reac, Wad DuBois, Geraldo Dominguez-Diaz, Shane White

December 4, 2025; 03:30 PM CST	Toledo	0–3	(4) Indiana	Wilkinson Hall, Bloomington, IN; Attendance: 1,815; Referees: Rod Rodriguez, Zack McCrite, Angela Poplewell, Cinque Robinson
December 4, 2025; 03:30 PM CST	(18–25, 15–25, 17–25); Report			Wilkinson Hall, Bloomington, IN; Attendance: 1,815; Referees: Rod Rodriguez, Zack McCrite, Angela Poplewell, Cinque Robinson

December 4, 2025; 07:00 PM CST	(3) Wisconsin	3–0	Eastern Illinois	UW Field House, Madison, WI; Attendance: 4,465; Referees: Barb Zvonek, Christina Fiebich, Scott Prox, Tracy Levine
December 4, 2025; 07:00 PM CST	(25–11, 25–6, 25–19); Report			UW Field House, Madison, WI; Attendance: 4,465; Referees: Barb Zvonek, Christina Fiebich, Scott Prox, Tracy Levine

December 4, 2025; 04:30 PM CST	North Carolina	3–1	(6) UTEP	UW Field House, Madison, WI; Attendance: 0 Referees: Krystian Krzyzak, Jim Kuziela, Peter Thomas, Connor Muff
December 4, 2025; 04:30 PM CST	(24–26, 25–11, 25–18, 25–21); Report			UW Field House, Madison, WI; Attendance: 0 Referees: Krystian Krzyzak, Jim Kuziela, Peter Thomas, Connor Muff

December 5, 2025; 05:30 PM CST	(7) South Dakota State	1-3	Arizona	Maples Pavilion, Palo Alto, CA; Attendance: 1,026
December 5, 2025; 05:30 PM CST	(21-25, 25-22, 15-25, 15-25); Report			Maples Pavilion, Palo Alto, CA; Attendance: 1,026

December 5, 2025; 09:00 PM CST	Utah Valley	1-3	(2) Stanford	Maples Pavilion, Palo Alto, CA; Attendance: 3,234
December 5, 2025; 09:00 PM CST	(25-21, 21-25, 13-25, 14-25); Report			Maples Pavilion, Palo Alto, CA; Attendance: 3,234

===== Second Round =====
December 5, 2025; 06:00 PM CST	(5) Colorado	0–3	(4) Indiana	Wilkinson Hall, Bloomington, IN; Attendance: 1,937
December 5, 2025; 06:00 PM CST	(20–25, 17–25, 23–25); Report			Wilkinson Hall, Bloomington, IN; Attendance: 1,937

December 6, 2025; 07:00 PM CST	(3) Wisconsin	3–0	North Carolina	UW Field House, Madison, WI; Attendance: 5,371
December 6, 2025; 07:00 PM CST	(25–14, 25–21, 27–25); Report			UW Field House, Madison, WI; Attendance: 5,371

December 6, 2025; 07:30 PM CST	(1) Texas	3–0	(8) Penn State	Gregory Gymnasium, Austin, TX; Attendance: 3,918
December 6, 2025; 07:30 PM CST	(25–16, 25–9, 25–19); Report			Gregory Gymnasium, Austin, TX; Attendance: 3,918

December 6, 2025; 05:30 PM CST	Arizona	1–3	(2) Stanford	Maples Pavilion, Palo Alto, CA; Attendance: 2,339
December 6, 2025; 05:30 PM CST	(16–25, 27–25, 17–25, 20–25); Report			Maples Pavilion, Palo Alto, CA; Attendance: 2,339

===== Regional Semifinals =====
December 12, 2025; 11:00 a.m. CST	(1) Texas	3–0	(4) Indiana	Gregory Gymnasium, Austin, TX; Attendance: 4,500
December 12, 2025; 11:00 a.m. CST	(25–20, 25–22, 25–22); Report			Gregory Gymnasium, Austin, TX; Attendance: 4,500

December 12, 2025; 1:30 p.m. CST	(3) Wisconsin	3–1	(2) Stanford	Gregory Gymnasium, Austin, TX; Attendance: 4,500
December 12, 2025; 1:30 p.m. CST	(25–17, 21–25, 25–23, 25–22); Report			Gregory Gymnasium, Austin, TX; Attendance: 4,500

===== Regional Final =====
December 14, 2025; 6:30 p.m. CST	(1) Texas	1–3	(3) Wisconsin	Gregory Gymnasium, Austin, TX; Attendance: 3,585; Referees: Sergio Gonzales, Daphne Nelson, Kaili Kimura, Talita Benavides
December 14, 2025; 6:30 p.m. CST	(22–25, 21–25, 25–20, 19–25); Report			Gregory Gymnasium, Austin, TX; Attendance: 3,585; Referees: Sergio Gonzales, Daphne Nelson, Kaili Kimura, Talita Benavides

==== Region All-Tournament Team ====
- Mimi Colyer (Most Outstanding Player) – Wisconsin
- Carter Booth – Wisconsin
- Kristen Simon – Wisconsin
- Cari Spears – Texas
- Torrey Stafford – Texas
- Elia Rubin – Stanford
- Candela Alonso-Corcelles – Indiana

=== Lexington, KY Regional ===
First Round; December 4
2	Arizona State	3
Coppin State	0
Tempe, AZ
Utah State	3
7	Tennessee	2
6	UNI	3
Utah	2
Omaha, NE
Northern Colorado	2
3	Creighton	3
4	Southern California	3
Princeton	0
Los Angeles, CA
Cal Poly	3
5	BYU	2
8	UCLA	3
Georgia Tech	2
Lexington, KY
Wofford	0
1	Kentucky	3

Second Round; December 5
2	Arizona State	3
Utah State	1
6	UNI	1
3	Creighton	3
4	Southern California	2
Cal Poly	3
8	UCLA	1
1	Kentucky	3

Regional Semifinals; December 11
2	Arizona State	1
3	Creighton	3
Cal Poly	0
1	Kentucky	3

Regional Finals; December 13
3	Creighton	0
1	Kentucky	3

==== Schedule ====
===== First Round =====
December 4, 2025; 08:00 PM CST	(2) Arizona State	3–0	Coppin State	Desert Financial Arena, Tempe, AZ; Attendance: 2,951; Referees: Nikki Kathol, Dean Hoskin, Ron Pelham, Sevastian/Matt Malcom/Hudson
December 4, 2025; 08:00 PM CST	(25–11, 25–14, 25–12); Report			Desert Financial Arena, Tempe, AZ; Attendance: 2,951; Referees: Nikki Kathol, Dean Hoskin, Ron Pelham, Sevastian/Matt Malcom/Hudson

December 4, 2025; 05:30 PM CST	Utah State	3–2	(7) Tennessee	Desert Financial Arena, Tempe, AZ; Attendance: 916; Referees: Daphne Nelson, Ron Pelham, Dean Hoskin, Robert/Kailee Cosby/Rowe
December 4, 2025; 05:30 PM CST	(25–19, 25–15, 20–25, 18–25, 15–11 ) Report			Desert Financial Arena, Tempe, AZ; Attendance: 916; Referees: Daphne Nelson, Ron Pelham, Dean Hoskin, Robert/Kailee Cosby/Rowe

December 4, 2025; 02:00 PM CST	(6) UNI	3–2	Utah	Sokol Arena, Omaha, NE; Attendance: 0 Referees: Pati Rolf, Lena Gustafson, Sarah Myres, Nathaniel Hutson
December 4, 2025; 02:00 PM CST	(15–25, 21–25, 26–24, 25–20, 15–10); Report			Sokol Arena, Omaha, NE; Attendance: 0 Referees: Pati Rolf, Lena Gustafson, Sarah Myres, Nathaniel Hutson

December 4, 2025; 07:00 PM CST	Northern Colorado	2–3	(3) Creighton	Sokol Arena, Omaha, NE; Attendance: 2,527; Referees: Jung Park, Al Cleary, Kelsi Jurik, Mark Akers
December 4, 2025; 07:00 PM CST	(12–25,25–23, 25–23, 17–25, 8–15); Report			Sokol Arena, Omaha, NE; Attendance: 2,527; Referees: Jung Park, Al Cleary, Kelsi Jurik, Mark Akers

December 4, 2025; 09:30 PM CST	(4) Southern California	3–0	Princeton	Galen Center, Los Angeles, CA; Attendance: 1,830; Referees: Paula Martin, Troy Gravett, Myles Furuya, Zitalli Martinez
December 4, 2025; 09:30 PM CST	(25–19, 25–12, 25–13); Report			Galen Center, Los Angeles, CA; Attendance: 1,830; Referees: Paula Martin, Troy Gravett, Myles Furuya, Zitalli Martinez

December 4, 2025; 07:00 PM CST	Cal Poly	3–2	(5) BYU	Galen Center, Los Angeles, CA; Attendance: 711; Referees: Paula Martin, Troy Gravett, Myles Furuya, Zitalli Martinez
December 4, 2025; 07:00 PM CST	(25–19, 17–25, 20–25, 25–20, 15–10); Report			Galen Center, Los Angeles, CA; Attendance: 711; Referees: Paula Martin, Troy Gravett, Myles Furuya, Zitalli Martinez

December 4, 2025; 03:00 PM CST	(8) UCLA	3–2	Georgia Tech	Memorial Coliseum, Lexington, KY; Attendance: 3,572
December 4, 2025; 03:00 PM CST	(24–26, 25–19, 23–25, 25–18, 15–10); Report			Memorial Coliseum, Lexington, KY; Attendance: 3,572

December 4, 2025; 05:00 PM CST	Wofford	0–3	(1) Kentucky	Memorial Coliseum, Lexington, KY; Attendance: 3,572
December 4, 2025; 05:00 PM CST	(11–25, 19–25, 12–25); Report			Memorial Coliseum, Lexington, KY; Attendance: 3,572

===== Second Round =====
December 5, 2025; 06:00 PM CST	(2) Arizona State	3–1	Utah State	Desert Financial Arena, Tempe, AZ; Attendance: 3,424
December 5, 2025; 06:00 PM CST	(25–15, 25–18, 22–25, 25–15)			Desert Financial Arena, Tempe, AZ; Attendance: 3,424

December 5, 2025; 06:30 PM CST	(6) UNI	1–3	(3) Creighton	Sokol Arena, Omaha, NE; Attendance: 2,554
December 5, 2025; 06:30 PM CST	(18–25, 25–23, 22–25, 21–25)			Sokol Arena, Omaha, NE; Attendance: 2,554

December 5, 2025; 10:00 PM CST	(4) Southern California	2–3	Cal Poly	Galen Center, Los Angeles, CA; Attendance: 2,173
December 5, 2025; 10:00 PM CST	(19–25, 20–25, 25–20, 25–14, 7–15)			Galen Center, Los Angeles, CA; Attendance: 2,173

December 5, 2025; 03:00 PM CST	(8) UCLA	1–3	(1) Kentucky	Memorial Coliseum, Lexington, KY; Attendance: 4,422; Referees: Kevin Wendelboe, Stephen Shepperd, Wade Brence
December 5, 2025; 03:00 PM CST	(28–30, 16–25, 30–28, 17–25)			Memorial Coliseum, Lexington, KY; Attendance: 4,422; Referees: Kevin Wendelboe, Stephen Shepperd, Wade Brence

===== Regional Semifinals =====
December 11, 2025; 12:00 p.m. CST	(2) Arizona State	1–3	(3) Creighton	Memorial Coliseum, Lexington, KY; Attendance: 4,039
December 11, 2025; 12:00 p.m. CST	(24-26, 25-19, 13-25, 18-25)			Memorial Coliseum, Lexington, KY; Attendance: 4,039

December 11, 2025; 2:30 p.m. CST	Cal Poly	0–3	(1) Kentucky	Memorial Coliseum, Lexington, KY; Attendance: 4,039
December 11, 2025; 2:30 p.m. CST	(18–25, 19–25, 7–25)			Memorial Coliseum, Lexington, KY; Attendance: 4,039

===== Regional Final =====
December 13, 2025; 4:00 p.m. CST	(3) Creighton	0–3	(1) Kentucky	Memorial Coliseum, Lexington, KY; Attendance: 6,122; Referees: Suzanne Lowry; Bill Stanley; Rachel Jensen; Alexis Sheldon
December 13, 2025; 4:00 p.m. CST	(19–25, 13–25, 18–25)			Memorial Coliseum, Lexington, KY; Attendance: 6,122; Referees: Suzanne Lowry; Bill Stanley; Rachel Jensen; Alexis Sheldon

==== Region All-Tournament Team ====
- Brooklyn DeLeye (Most Outstanding Player) – Kentucky
- Eva Hudson – Kentucky
- Molly Tuozzo – Kentucky
- Lizzie Carr – Kentucky
- Ava Martin – Creighton
- Sydney Breissinger – Creighton
- Noemie Glover – Arizona State

== Final Four ==
National Semifinals; T-Mobile Center; December 18
3	Texas A&M	3
1	Pittsburgh	0
3	Wisconsin	2
1	Kentucky	3

National Championship; T-Mobile Center; December 21
3	Texas A&M	3
1	Kentucky	0

=== National semifinals ===
December 18, 2025; 5:30 p.m. CST	(3) Texas A&M	3–0	(1) Pittsburgh	T-Mobile Center, Kansas City, Missouri; Attendance: 18,332; Referees: Devontie McLarty; Daphne Nelson; Rachel Jensen; Scott Prox
December 18, 2025; 5:30 p.m. CST	(29–27, 25–21, 25–20); Report			T-Mobile Center, Kansas City, Missouri; Attendance: 18,332; Referees: Devontie McLarty; Daphne Nelson; Rachel Jensen; Scott Prox

December 18, 2025; 08:00 PM CST	(3) Wisconsin	2–3	(1) Kentucky	T-Mobile Center, Kansas City, Missouri; Attendance: 18,332; Referees: Jim Juziela; Brian Hemelgarn; Nathaniel Wagner; Sarah Myres
December 18, 2025; 08:00 PM CST	(25–12, 22–25, 25–21, 24–26, 13–15); Report			T-Mobile Center, Kansas City, Missouri; Attendance: 18,332; Referees: Jim Juziela; Brian Hemelgarn; Nathaniel Wagner; Sarah Myres

=== National championship ===
December 21, 2025; 2:30 p.m. CST	(3) Texas A&M	3–0	(1) Kentucky	T-Mobile Center, Kansas City, Missouri; Attendance: 18,400; Referees: Devonie McLarty; Daphne Nelson; Rachel Jensen; Sarah Myres
December 21, 2025; 2:30 p.m. CST	(26–24, 25–15, 25–20); Report			T-Mobile Center, Kansas City, Missouri; Attendance: 18,400; Referees: Devonie McLarty; Daphne Nelson; Rachel Jensen; Sarah Myres

=== Final Four All-Tournament team ===
- Kyndal Stowers (Most Outstanding Player) – Texas A&M
- Ifenna Cos-Okpalla – Texas A&M
- Logan Lednicky – Texas A&M
- Ava Underwood – Texas A&M
- Eva Hudson – Kentucky
- Olivia Babcock – Pittsburgh

== Records by conference ==
Overview of conference performance in the 2025 NCAA Division I women's volleyball tournament
Conference	Bids	Record	Win %	R32	S16	E8	F4	CG	NC
SEC	5	15–4	.789	4	3	3	2	2	1
Big Ten	9	18–9	.666	9	5	3	1	–	–
ACC	7	12–7	.631	6	4	1	1	–	–
Big East	3	4–3	.571	2	1	1	–	–	–
Big 12	10	10–10	.500	8	2	–	–	–	–
Big West	1	2–1	.666	1	1	–	–	–	–
Missouri Valley	1	1–1	.500	1	–	–	–	–	–
Mountain West	1	1–1	.500	1	–	–	–	–	–
American	3	0–3	.000	–	–	–	–	–	–
C-USA	2	0–2	.000	–	–	–	–	–	–
Summit	2	0–2	.000	–	–	–	–	–	–
Others	20	0–20	.000	–	–	–	–	–	–

- The following conferences had a single team that failed to advance beyond the round of 64: America East, Atlantic 10, ASUN, Big Sky, Big South, CAA, Horizon, Ivy League, MAAC, MEAC, MAC, Northeast, Ohio Valley, Patriot, SoCon, Southland, SWAC, Sun Belt, WAC, WCC. These conferences' records have been consolidated in the "Others" row.
