= 2026 NCAA Division I women's volleyball tournament =

Postseason collegiate women's volleyball tournament

2026 NCAA women's Division I volleyball tournament
- 2026 NCAA Division I women's volleyball tournament
- Finals site: Alamodome; San Antonio, Texas

The 2026 NCAA Division I women's volleyball tournament will be a single-elimination tournament of 64 teams that will determine the National Collegiate Athletic Association (NCAA) Division I women's volleyball national champion for the 2026 season. It will be the 46th edition of the tournament. It will begin on December 3th, 2026 in various college campuses across the country, location determinations will be chosen based on participating teams seedings. The tournament will conclude with the championship game at Alamodome in San Antonio, Texas on December 20nd, 2026.

== Tournament schedule and venues ==
First and Second Rounds (Subregionals)

- December 3 – December 6
  - TBD

Regional semifinals and finals

- December 10 – December 13
  - TBD
2026 NCAA Regionals (TBD) and Final Four

National semifinals and championship

- December 17 & 20
  - Alamodome, San Antonio, Texas (Host: University of Texas San Antonio & San Antonio Sports Commission)

== Qualifying teams ==
=== Automatic qualifiers ===
The following teams received automatic bids to the tournament by winning either the regular season conference title or their conference tournament.

Automatic qualifiers in the 2026 NCAA Division I women's volleyball tournament
Conference	Team
America East	New Hampshire
American	Tulsa
ACC	
ASUN	Lipscomb
Atlantic 10	Dayton
Big East	Creighton
Big Sky	
Big South	
Big Ten	
Big 12	
Big West	
CAA	Towson
CUSA	Western Kentucky
Horizon	Wright State
Ivy League	Yale
MAAC	Fairfield
MAC	
MEAC	
Missouri Valley	
Mountain West	
NEC	Fairleigh Dickinson
Ohio Valley	
Patriot	
Pac-12	
SEC	
Southern	
Southland	
SWAC	
Summit	
Sun Belt	
UAC	Eastern Kentucky
WCC	

=== Tournament seeds ===
TBD

== Bracket ==
=== Top Left Regional ===
First Round

Second Round

Regional Semifinals

Regional Finals

=== Bottom Left Regional ===
First Round

Second Round

Regional Semifinals

Regional Finals

=== Top Right Regional ===
First Round

Second Round

Regional Semifinals

Regional Finals

=== Bottom Right Regional ===
First Round

Second Round

Regional Semifinals

Regional Finals

== Final Four ==
National Semifinals; Alamodome; December 17

National Championship; Alamodome; December 20

=== National semifinals ===
December 17, 2026	v	Alamodome, San Antonio, Texas

December 17, 2026; TBD	v	Alamodome, San Antonio, Texas

=== National championship ===
December 20, 2026	v	Alamodome, San Antonio, Texas

=== Final Four All-Tournament Team ===
The following players were named to the final four all-tournament team:

== Records by Conference ==
- The following conferences had a single team that failed to advance beyond the round of 64:
