= Graham Rossini =

American college athletic administrator

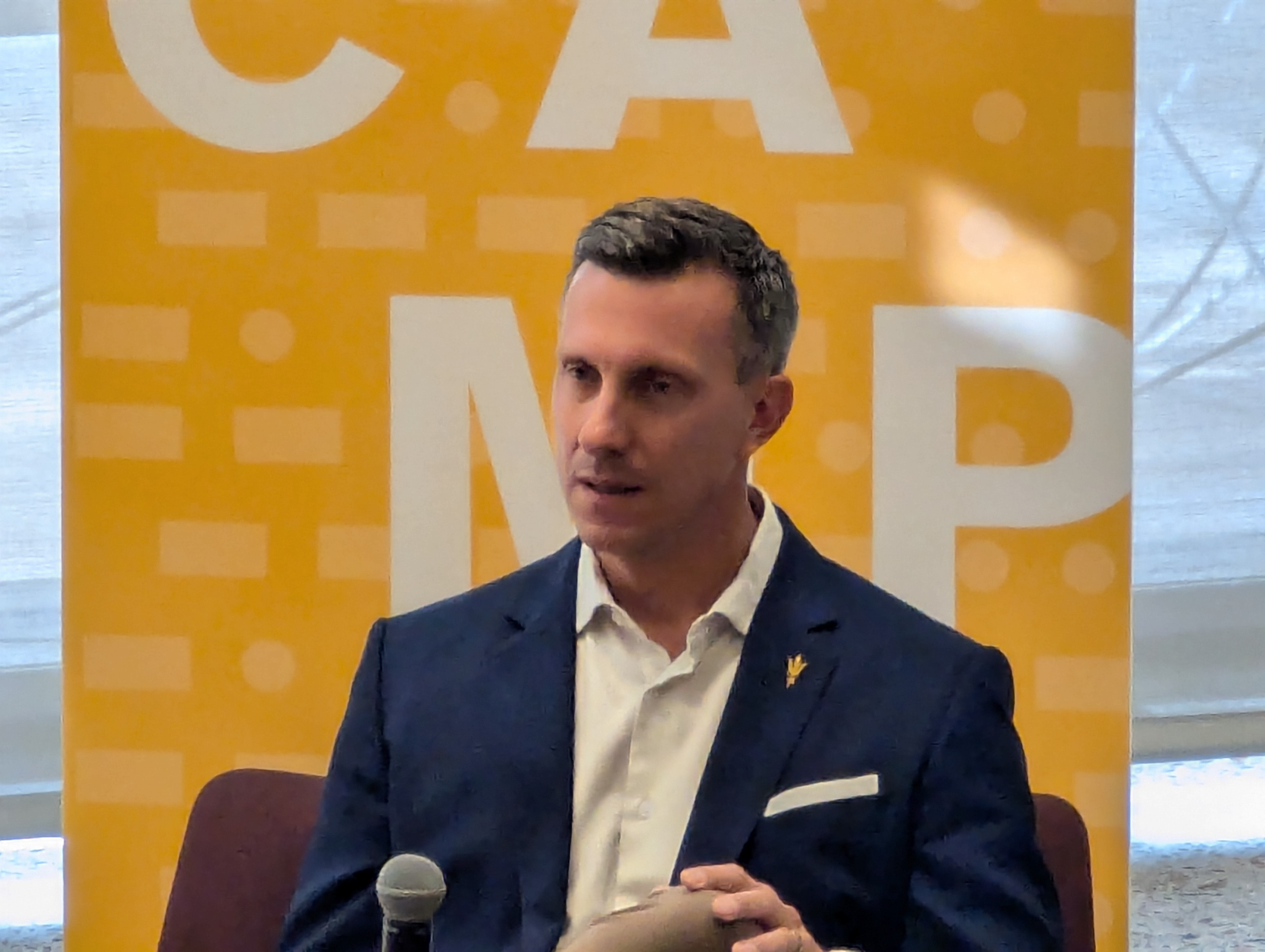
- Rossini in 2024

Current position
- Title: Athletic Director
- Team: Arizona State

Biographical details
- Education: Arizona State University

Administrative career (AD unless noted)
- 2024–present: Arizona State

Graham Rossini (born 1979 or 1980) is an American college athletic administrator who has served as the athletic director at Arizona State University (ASU) since 2024. A 2002 ASU graduate, Rossini worked for the university's athletic department before taking a post with the Arizona Diamondbacks. He returned to the university in 2021 and was promoted to athletic director in 2024.

== Career ==
Rossini grew up in Mobile, Alabama, and began following ASU baseball because he owned a baseball card of Atlanta Braves outfielder and ASU product Mike Kelly. When Rossini went to college at ASU, he tried out for the baseball team, but at a height of 6 feet 5 inches (1.96 m), he was at a disadvantage; Tuffy Gosewisch recalled that Rossini was "the tallest, skinniest catcher of all time". Coach Pat Murphy suggested that Rossini may not be good enough to play and suggested he look into becoming a student assistant, an idea he accepted; in this role, his duties included washing the team's laundry. After graduating from ASU in 2002, he became the director of operations for ASU baseball.

For 13 years, Rossini worked in the business office of the Arizona Diamondbacks baseball club, last serving as vice president of special projects and fan experience. During his tenure, he led the execution of capital projects including the construction of Salt River Fields at Talking Stick and a team academy in the Dominican Republic, and he led the team's bids for the 2011 MLB All-Star Game and to host games of the 2013 and 2023 editions of the World Baseball Classic. He also worked a year in England at professional soccer club Lincoln City F.C.

Rossini returned to ASU in 2021 as senior associate athletic director. He was promoted to executive senior associate athletic director in 2023, with a portfolio that included negotiating naming rights deals for Desert Financial Arena and Mountain America Stadium. In addition, he was part of the transition team leading ASU's migration from the Pac-12 Conference to the Big 12 Conference.

=== As ASU athletic director ===
In November 2023, ASU athletic director Ray Anderson presented his resignation after nearly a decade in the position. In the interim period, university administration under president Michael M. Crow restructured the athletic department in a similar fashion to its counterparts at Northwestern, Stanford and Vanderbilt, with an increased integration into university operations. Rossini was largely seen as Crow's favorite; some boosters expressed reservations about promoting from within given recent turbulence in the athletic department, including probation and sanctions levied by the NCAA on the football program. Rossini was announced as ASU's new athletic director on May 23, 2024.

A task facing Rossini was addressing the previous attitude to name, image and likeness (NIL) support. Under Anderson, ASU's NIL operation was perceived to be behind its peers. In November 2023, ASU head football coach Kenny Dillingham described ASU as "dead last" in the Pac-12 on NIL matters. Likewise, Rossini was seen as bringing a strong fundraising background to the position and stated in an interview that the athletic department had "embraced" NIL as a method of fan support. Within months of taking the position, Michelle Gardner of the Arizona Republic wrote that ASU's NIL program had "improved by light years", enabling the men's basketball program to assemble a top-10 recruiting class. Rossini has also addressed topics including possible renovations to Desert Financial Arena, which was completed in 1974 and is seen to be in general need of updates.

Rossini's first season in the job was also ASU's first in Big 12 competition. The football program won the Big 12 title and advanced to the semifinals of the College Football Playoff, and the volleyball and men's and women's swim and dive teams each won Big 12 titles. Rossini extended the contracts of football coach Dillingham and volleyball coach JJ Van Niel while hiring Jamea Jackson to coach women's tennis and Molly Miller, previously of Grand Canyon University, to coach women's basketball.

In April 2025, ASU proposed to the Arizona Board of Regents extending Rossini's contract, originally set to run through 2027, through 2030, increasing his annual base salary from $650,000 to $950,000.
