= Arizona State Sun Devils women's volleyball =

Women's volleyball team of Arizona State University

- Founded: 1976
- University: Arizona State University
- Head coach: JJ Van Niel (3rd season)
- Conference: Big 12
- Location: Tempe, Arizona, US
- Home arena: Desert Financial Arena (capacity: 14,198)
- Nickname: Arizona State Sun Devils
- Colors: Maroon and gold

AIAW/NCAA regional semifinal
- 1994, 1995, 2023, 2025

AIAW/NCAA tournament appearance
- 1981, 1982, 1983, 1985, 1986, 1992, 1993, 1994, 1995, 1999, 2000, 2002, 2006, 2012, 2013, 2014, 2015, 2023, 2024, 2025

Conference regular season champion
- Big 12; 2024, 2025

The Arizona State Sun Devils women's volleyball team represents Arizona State University in NCAA Division I intercollegiate women's volleyball competition. Arizona State is a member of the Big 12 Conference. The Sun Devils have been led by JJ Van Niel since 2023.

The program became an official varsity sport in 1976 and has won the Big 12 regular season in 2024 and 2025.

== Program record and history ==
Arizona State University first fielded a women's volleyball team in the fall of 1976. Since then the Sun Devils have been to the NCAA Tournament 22 times.

Year	Head Coach	Overall Record	Conference Record	Conference Standing	Postseason
1973	Mary Littlewood	21–0	8–0	1st	AIAW Championship
1974	Mary Littlewood	11–6	10–2	2nd	
1975	Mary Littlewood	21–8	13–5	1st	
1976	Mary Littlewood	15–7	11–1	1st	
1977	Mary Littlewood	14–8	8–4	2nd	
1978	Mary Littlewood	13–7	9–4	2nd	
(WCAA) (1979–1984)
1979	Dale Flickinger	13–9	4–8	7th	
1980	Dale Flickinger	24–17	4–8	7th	
1981	Dale Flickinger	13–16	4–8	8th	NCAA First Round
1982	Dale Flickinger	31–16	8–6	5th	NCAA Second Round
1983	Debbie Brown	17–17	6–8	6th	NCAA First Round
1984	Debbie Brown	15–18	3–11	8th	
(PacWest) (1985–1985)
1985	Debbie Brown	22–13	2–6	3rd	NCAA First Round
(Pac–10) (1986–2010)
1986	Debbie Brown	27–7	13–5	3rd	NCAA Second Round
1987	Debbie Brown	16–15	9–9	7th	NCAA First Round
1988	Debbie Brown	20–13	8–10	6th	NCAA First Round
1989	Patti Snyder-Park	13–21	4–4	9th	
1990	Patti Snyder-Park	19–16	8–10	6th	NIVC
1991	Patti Snyder-Park	14–12	8–10	6th	
1992	Patti Snyder-Park	23–8	11–7	4th	NCAA Second Round
1993	Patti Snyder-Park	20–8	13–5	2nd	NCAA First Round
1994	Patti Snyder-Park	18–10	11–7	4th	NCAA Second Round
1995	Patti Snyder-Park	19–8	11–7	4th	NCAA Second Round
1996	Patti Snyder-Park	9–15	4–14	8th	
1997	Patti Snyder-Park	13–16	4–14	8th	
1998	Patti Snyder-Park	11–14	8–10	5th	
1999	Patti Snyder-Park	14–13	10–8	5th	NCAA First Round
2000	Patti Snyder-Park	18–12	9–9	5th	NCAA Second Round
2001	Patti Snyder-Park	10–16	5–13	7th	
2002	Patti Snyder-Park	15–12	8–10	7th	NCAA Second Round
2003	Brad Saindon	9–18	4–14	9th	
2004	Brad Saindon	10–17	5–13	7th	
2005	Brad Saindon	8–20	3–15	8th	
2006	Brad Saindon	16–15	7–11	6th	NCAA Second Round
2007	Brad Saindon	15–16	7–11	7th	
2008	Jason Watson	13–18	4–14	8th	
2009	Jason Watson	13–17	3–15	9th	
2010	Jason Watson	13–18	7–11	7th	
(Pac–12) (2011–2023)
2011	Jason Watson	9–22	5–17	10th	
2012	Jason Watson	20–14	9–11	9th	NCAA First Round
2013	Jason Watson	19–14	8–12	8th	NCAA First Round
2014	Jason Watson	20–14	9–11	T–7	NCAA Second Round
2015	Jason Watson	19–13	8–12	8th	NCAA First Round
2016	Stevie Mussie	12–20	5–15	T–11	
2017	Sanja Tomasevic	10–22	0–20	12th	
2018	Sanja Tomasevic	14–18	5–15	11th	
2019	Sanja Tomasevic	17–14	9–11	8th	
2020	Sanja Tomasevic	6–14	6–14	9th	
2021	Sanja Tomasevic	14–17	7–13	9th	
2022	Sanja Tomasevic	13–19	7–13	9th	
2023	JJ Van Niel	28–7	14–6	T–3	NCAA Sweet 16
(Big 12) (2024–present)
2024	JJ Van Niel	30–3	17–1	1st	NCAA Second Round
2025	JJ Van Niel	24–8	17–1	1st	NCAA Sweet 16
Total		861–716	400–499		

== See also ==
- List of NCAA Division I women's volleyball programs
