= Arizona State Sun Devils women's beach volleyball =

American college volleyball team

- University: Arizona State University
- Conference: Big 12
- Location: Tempe, Arizona, US
- Home arena: Sun Devil Beach Volleyball Facility

AIAW/NCAA tournament appearance
- 1

The Arizona State Sun Devils women's beach volleyball team represents Arizona State University in the sport of beach volleyball. The Sun Devils compete in Division I of the National Collegiate Athletic Association (NCAA) and the Big 12 Conference. ASU is currently one of seven schools to play beach volleyball in the Big 12 Conference, along with Arizona, Boise State, Florida State, South Carolina, TCU, and Utah. During their time in the Pac-12 Conference, ASU was one of nine schools, along with Arizona, California, Oregon, Stanford, UCLA, USC, Utah, and Washington. In 2024, Arizona State earned their 1st NCAA Tournament appearance in program history.

== History ==
Arizona State University began their sand volleyball program in 2014. It officially became an NCAA Championship sport in 2016, as they changed the sport's name to beach volleyball. In their first four seasons, the Arizona State Sun Devils have had three head coaches. Jason Watson led ASU for two seasons from 2014 to 2015, Jackie Bunker for one season in 2016, Brad Keenan for seven seasons from 2017 to 2023, and Kristen Rohr Glattfelder starting in 2024.

== Year-by-year results ==
Year	Head Coach	Overall	Conference	Standing	Division	Postseason
Arizona State Sun Devils (Pac-12 Conference) (2014–present)
2014	Jason Watson	6–4				
2015	Jason Watson	7–13				
2016	Jackie Bunker	12–13				
2017	Brad Keenan	16–16				
2018	Brad Keenan	11–20				
2019	Brad Keenan	21–14				
2020	Brad Keenan	4–6				
2021	Brad Keenan	10–12				
2022	Brad Keenan	17–15				
2023	Brad Keenan	11–13				
2024	Kristen Rohr Glattfelder	21-10				NCAA Tournament 1st Round
2025	Kristen Rohr Glattfelder	22-14				
2026	Kristen Rohr Glattfelder	18-15				
Total		176–165				

=== 2014 Season summary ===
During their inaugural season in 2014, the Sand Devils finished (6–4) overall under Head Coach Jason Watson. Jackie Bunker was an Assistant Coach. The 2014 team included: (Bianca Arellano, BreElle Bailey, Mercedes Binns, Jordy Checkal, Whitney Follette, Macey Gardner, Kwyn Johnson, Bethany Jorgensen, Andi Lowrance, Mia Mazon, Shannon McCready, Genevieve Pirotte, Kizzy Willey-Ricedorff, and Nora Tuioti-Mariner).

==== Season results ====
- March 8, 2014 vs Arizona Christian at Arizona Invitational in Tucson, Arizona W 5–0
- March 8, 2014 at Arizona at Arizona Invitational in Tucson, Arizona L 4–1
- March 14, 2014 vs Tulane at Wildcat Spring Challenge in Tucson, Arizona W 3–2
- March 15, 2014 vs Arizona Christian at Wildcat Spring Challenge in Tucson, Arizona W 5–0
- March 26, 2014 vs Nebraska at PERA Club in Tempe, Arizona L 3–2
- April 19, 2014 vs Cal State Bakersfield at Pac-12 Tournament in Santa Monica, California L 4–1
- April 19, 2014 vs Arizona at Pac-12 Tournament in Santa Monica, California W 3–2
- April 19, 2014 vs USC at Pac-12 Tournament in Santa Monica, California L 5–0
- April 24, 2014 vs Arizona at PERA Club in Tempe, Arizona W 3–2
- April 25, 2014 vs Boise State AT PERA Club in Tempe, Arizona W 5–0

=== 2015 Season summary ===
The Sun Devils completed the 2015 campaign (7–13) overall under Head Coach Jason Watson. Jackie Bunker was an Assistant Coach and Deb Rose was a Volunteer Assistant Coach. The 2015 team included: (Bianca Arellano, BreElle Bailey, Madison Berridge, Mercedes Binns, Jordy Checkal, Whitney Follette, Macey Gardner, Frances Giedraitis, Halle Harker, Kwyn Johnson, Genevieve Pirotte, Bethany Jorgensen, Andi Lowrance, Mia Mazon, Sydney Palmer, Kizzy Willey-Ricedorff, Mia Rivera, and Blair Robalin).

==== Season results ====
- March 6, 2015 vs Tulane at Arizona Invitational in Tucson, Arizona L 3–2
- March 6, 2015 vs LSU at Arizona Invitational in Tucson, Arizona L 4–1
- March 7, 2015 vs TCU at Arizona Invitational in Tucson, Arizona W 5–0
- March 20, 2015 vs Florida State at South Carolina Invitational in Columbia, SC L 4–1
- March 20, 2015 at South Carolina at South Carolina Invitational in Columbia, SC L 4–1
- March 21, 2015 vs Georgia State at South Carolina Invitational in Columbia, SC L 4–1
- March 21, 2015 vs Carson-Newman at South Carolina Invitational in Columbia, SC W 5–0
- March 22, 2015 vs Tulane at South Carolina Invitational in Columbia, SC L 3–2
- March 25, 2015 vs Nebraska at PERA Club in Tempe, Arizona L 3–2
- March 26, 2015 vs Boise State at PERA Club in Tempe, Arizona W 3–2
- March 28, 2015 vs USC at PERA Club in Tempe, Arizona L 5–0
- March 28, 2015 vs New Mexico at PERA Club in Tempe, Arizona W 5–0
- April 10, 2015 vs Arizona in ASU Sand Volleyball Challenge at PERA Club in Tempe, Arizona L 4–1
- April 11, 2015 vs New Mexico in ASU Sand Volleyball Challenge at PERA Club in Tempe, Arizona W 4–1
- April 11, 2015 vs Cal State Bakersfield in ASU Sand Volleyball Challenge at PERA Club in Tempe, Arizona L 3–2
- April 18, 2015 vs California at Pac-12 Tournament in Santa Monica, California W 4–1
- April 18, 2015 vs USC at Pac-12 Tournament in Santa Monica, California L 4–1
- April 18, 2015 vs UCLA at Pac-12 Tournament in Santa Monica, California W 3–2
- April 18, 2015 vs Arizona at Pac-12 Tournament in Santa Monica, California L 3–2
- April 22, 2015 at Arizona in Tucson, Arizona L 4–1

=== 2016 Season summary ===
ASU finished the 2016 season (12–13) overall under Head Coach Jackie Bunker. Deb Rose was an Assistant Coach. The 2016 team included: (Bianca Arellano, Madison Berridge, Natalie Braun, Whitney Follette, Frances Giedraitis, Kwyn Johnson, Sydney Palmer, Jourdan Parnell, Californiassidy Pickrell, Kylie Pickrell, Logan Rae, Mia Rivera, Blair Robalin, and Bethany Wedepohl).

==== Awards ====
- Bianca Arellano was named Pac-12 All-Conference 1st Team and earned Pac-12 All-Academic 1st Team
- Whitney Follette earned Pac-12 All-Conference 1st Team and was named Pac-12 All-Academic Honorable Mention
- Frances Giedraitis was named Pac-12 All-Academic 1st Team
- Kwyn Johnson received Pac-12 All-Academic 1st Team
- Sydney Palmer was named Pac-12 All-Academic Honorable Mention
- Mia Rivera earned Pac-12 All-Academic 2nd Team
- Genevieve Pirotte earned Pac-12 All-Academic 2nd Team

==== Season results ====
- March 4, 2016 vs New Mexico in Sun Devil Challenge at PERA Club in Tempe, Arizona L 3–2
- March 4, 2016 vs # 6 Florida State in Sun Devil Challenge at PERA Club in Tempe, Arizona L 5–0
- March 5, 2016 vs Colorado Mesa in Sun Devil Challenge at PERA Club in Tempe, Arizona W 5–0
- March 5, 2016 vs # 17 South Carolina in Sun Devil Challenge at PERA Club in Tempe, Arizona W 4–1
- March 10, 2016 at Loyola Marymount in Los Angeles, California W 5–0
- March 10, 2016 at # 2 USC in Los Angeles, California L 5–0
- March 11, 2016 at # 4 Long Beach State in Long Beach, California L 4–1
- March 18, 2016 vs Colorado Mesa at UNM Spring Beach Tournament in Albuquerque, New Mexico W 4–1
- March 19, 2016 vs New Mexico State at UNM Spring Beach Tournament in Albuquerque, New Mexico W 5–0
- March 19, 2016 at New Mexico at UNM Spring Beach Tournament in Albuquerque, New Mexico L 4–1
- March 25, 2016 vs Cal State Bakersfield at Wildcat Spring Challenge in Tucson, Arizona W 4–1
- March 25, 2016 vs Cal State Northridge at Wildcat Spring Challenge in Tucson, Arizona W 5–0
- April 2, 2016 at # 4 Hawaii at Outrigger Beach VB Challenge in Honolulu, Hawaii L 5–0
- April 2, 2016 vs # 5 UCLA at Outrigger Beach VB Challenge in Honolulu, Hawaii L 5–0
- April 9, 2016 vs Oregon at Stanford Tournament in Palo Alto, California W 3–2
- April 9, 2016 at Stanford at Stanford Tournament in Palo Alto, California L 3–2
- April 10, 2016 vs Boise State at Stanford Tournament in Palo Alto, California W 3–2
- April 10, 2016 vs # 16 California at Stanford Tournament in Palo Alto, California L 4–1
- April 14, 2016 at Arizona in Tucson, Arizona L 4–1
- April 16, 2016 vs San Diego State at PERA Club in Tempe, Arizona W 5–0
- April 16, 2016 vs Grossmont College at PERA Club in Tempe, Arizona W 5–0
- April 20, 2016 vs Arizona at PERA Club in Tempe, Arizona L 4–1
- April 29, 2016 vs California at Pac-12 Tournament in Los Angeles, California L 3–2
- April 30, 2016 vs Oregon at Pac-12 Tournament in Los Angeles, California W 3–2
- April 30, 2016 vs Arizona at Pac-12 Tournament in Los Angeles, California L 5–0

=== 2017 Season summary ===
The Sun Devils completed the 2017 campaign (16–16) overall under Head Coach Brad Keenan. ASU entered the AVCA Beach Volleyball poll for the first time in school history, reaching as high as # 10. The Maroon and Gold was ranked in five of the eleven weeks for the AVCA poll. Arizona State finished (5–2) at home, (4–3) on the road, (7–11) in neutral site contests, and (2–12) against ranked opponents. The 2017 team included: (Bianca Arellano, Madison Berridge, Natalie Braun, Katelyn Carballo, Katie Cross, Whitney Follette, Frances Giedraitis, Kwyn Johnson, Ellyson Lundberg, Oluoma Okaro, Sydney Palmer, Jourdan Parnell, Sage Patchell, Californiassidy Pickrell, Mia Rivera, Bethany Wedepohl, and Kara Woodard).

==== Awards ====
- Bianca Arellano was named Pac-12 All-Conference 1st Team and earned Pac-12 All-Academic 1st Team
- Whitney Follette earned Pac-12 All-Conference 1st Team and received Pac-12 All-Academic 1st Team
- Kwyn Johnson claimed Pac-12 All-Academic 1st Team
- Genevieve Pirotte was awarded Pac-12 All-Academic 2nd Team
- Oluoma Okaro received Pac-12 All-Conference 2nd Team
- Cassidy Pickrell earned Pac-12 All-Academic 1st Team
- Mia Rivera was awarded Pac-12 All-Academic 2nd Team

==== Season results ====
- March 3, 2017 vs # 5 Hawaii at Arizona Invitational in Tucson, Arizona L 4–1
- March 3, 2017 vs Jacksonville at Arizona Invitational in Tucson, Arizona W 4–1
- March 4, 2017 at # 6 Arizona at Arizona Invitational in Tucson, Arizona W 3–2
- March 11, 2017 vs # 8 Arizona in Sun Devil Challenge at PERA Club in Tempe, Arizona L 3–2
- March 12, 2017 vs New Mexico in Sun Devil Challenge at PERA Club in Tempe, Arizona W 3–2
- March 12, 2017 vs Texas A&M Kingsville in Sun Devil Challenge at PERA Club in Tempe, Arizona W 5–0
- March 17, 2017 at Cal State Bakersfield in Bakersfield, California W 5–0
- March 18, 2017 vs TCU at Zuma Classic in Malibu, California L 3–2
- March 18, 2017 at # 2 Pepperdine at Zuma Classic in Malibu, California L 5–0
- March 18, 2017 vs Cal State Los Angeles at Zuma Classic in Malibu, California W 5–0
- March 23, 2017 vs Nebraska at PERA Club in Tempe, Arizona L 3–2
- March 24, 2017 at TCU at Horned Frog Challenge in Fort Worth, Texas W 3–2
- March 24, 2017 vs # 8 LSU at Horned Frog Challenge in Fort Worth, Texas L 3–2
- March 25, 2017 vs # 8 LSU at Horned Frog Challenge in Fort Worth, Texas L 4–1
- March 31, 2017 vs # 3 UCLA at FIU Surf & Turf Invitational in Miami, Florida L 5–0
- March 31, 2017 vs # 18 Tulane at FIU Surf & Turf Invitational in Miami, Florida L 4–1
- March 31, 2017 at # 15 Florida International at FIU Surf & Turf Invitational in Miami, Florida L 4–1
- April 1, 2017 vs New Orleans at FIU Surf & Turf Invitational in Miami, Florida W 4–1
- April 1, 2017 vs # 14 Florida Atlantic at FIU Surf & Turf Invitational in Miami, Florida W 3–2
- April 1, 2017 vs # 4 Florida State at FIU Surf & Turf Invitational in Miami, Florida L 5–0
- April 7, 2017 at # 1 USC in Los Angeles, California L 5–0
- April 8, 2017 vs St. Mary's California at USAV Beach Collegiate Challenge in Manhattan Beach, California W 3–2
- April 8, 2017 vs # 1 USC at USAV Beach Collegiate Challenge in Manhattan Beach, California L 4–1
- April 8, 2017 vs Loyola Marymount at USAV Beach Collegiate Challenge in Manhattan Beach, California L 4–1
- April 14, 2017 vs Concordia-Irvine in Northridge, California W 5–0
- April 14, 2017 at Cal State Northridge in Northridge, California W 3–2
- April 21, 2017 vs New Mexico at PERA Club in Tempe, Arizona W 4–1
- April 21, 2017 vs California at PERA Club in Tempe, Arizona W 3–2
- April 22, 2017 vs Stanford at PERA Club in Tempe, Arizona W 5–0
- April 27, 2017 vs Stanford at Pac-12 Tournament in Tucson, Arizona W 5–0
- April 27, 2017 vs # 1 USC at Pac-12 Tournament in Tucson, Arizona L 5–0
- April 27, 2017 vs Washington at Pac-12 Tournament in Tucson, Arizona L 3–2

=== 2018 Season summary ===
With Brad Keenan entering his second season as the Sun Devils Head Coach, Arizona State finished the 2018 campaign with an (11–20) record. ASU completed the season (2–4) at home, (2–4) on the road, (7–12) in neutral site contests, and (2–16) against ranked opponents. Kristal Harris was an Assistant Coach and Ryan Wrublik was a Volunteer Assistant Coach. The 2018 roster included: (Bailey Anderson, Kate Baldwin, Natalie Braun, Katelyn Carballo, Katie Cross, Sierra Ellett, Cierra Flood, Frances Giedraitis, Halle Harker, Kwyn Johnson, Ellyson Lundberg, Sydney Palmer, Jourdan Parnell, Samantha Plaster, Mia Rivera, Californiassidy Schilling, and Kara Woodard).

==== Awards ====
- Frances Giedraitis received 1st Team All-Academic Pac-12 honors
- Kwyn Johnson earned 1st Team All-Academic Pac-12 honors
- Ellyson Lundberg claimed 1st Team All-Academic Pac-12 honors
- Katie Cross received 2nd Team All-Academic Pac-12 honors
- Katelyn Carballo earned Honorable Mention All-Academic Pac-12 honors
- Mia Rivera claimed Honorable Mention All-Academic Pac-12 honors

==== Season results ====
- February 24, 2018 vs # 1 USC at PERA Club in Tempe, Arizona L 3–2
- February 25, 2018 vs Nebraska at PERA Club in Tempe, Arizona W 3–2
- February 25, 2018 vs # 14 Cal Poly at PERA Club in Tempe, Arizona L 3–2
- March 3, 2018 vs # 8 Cal Poly at TCU Fight in the Fort Tournament in Fort Worth, Texas L 4–1
- March 3, 2018 vs # 18 Tulane at TCU Fight in the Fort Tournament in Fort Worth, Texas L 5–0
- March 4, 2018 at # 14 TCU at TCU Fight in the Fort Tournament in Fort Worth, Texas W 4–1
- March 9, 2018 vs San Jose State at Stanford Invitational in Palo Alto, California W 4–1
- March 9, 2018 vs California at Stanford Invitational in Palo Alto, California L 4–1
- March 10, 2018 vs # 18 Tulane at Stanford Invitational in Palo Alto, California L 3–2
- March 10, 2018 at # 14 Stanford at Stanford Invitational in Palo Alto, California L 3–2
- March 24, 2018 vs # 2 UCLA at Pac-12 South Invitational in Santa Monica, California L 5–0
- March 24, 2018 vs # 4 USC at Pac-12 South Invitational in Santa Monica, California L 4–1
- March 25, 2018 vs # 14 Stanford at Pac-12 South Invitational in Santa Monica, California L 3–2
- March 25, 2018 vs # 19 Washington at Pac-12 South Invitational in Santa Monica, California W 4–1
- March 30, 2018 vs Abilene Christian at Lucky 66 Bowl in Albuquerque, New Mexico W 5–0
- March 30, 2018 vs Colorado Mesa at Lucky 66 Bowl in Albuquerque, New Mexico W 5–0
- March 31, 2018 at New Mexico at Lucky 66 Bowl in Albuquerque, New Mexico W 4–1
- March 31, 2018 vs Colorado Mesa at Lucky 66 Bowl in Albuquerque, New Mexico W 5–0
- April 6, 2018 vs # 14 California at Wildcat Spring Challenge in Tucson, Arizona L 5–0
- April 6, 2018 vs Colorado Mesa at Wildcat Spring Challenge in Tucson, Arizona W 5–0
- April 6, 2018 at # 15 Arizona at Wildcat Spring Challenge in Tucson, Arizona L 4–1
- April 7, 2018 vs # 17 Stetson at PERA Club in Tempe, Arizona L 4–1
- April 7, 2018 vs Vanguard at PERA Club in Tempe, Arizona W 5–0
- April 14, 2018 vs Boise State at Senior Celebration in Honolulu, Hawaii L 3–2
- April 14, 2018 at # 3 Hawaii at Senior Celebration in Honolulu, Hawaii L 5–0
- April 15, 2018 vs Boise State at Senior Celebration in Honolulu, Hawaii L 3–2
- April 15, 2018 at # 3 Hawaii at Senior Celebration in Honolulu, Hawaii L 5–0
- April 18, 2018 vs # 14 Arizona at PERA Club in Tempe, Arizona L 3–2
- April 26, 2018 vs # 5 USC at Pac-12 Tournament in Palo Alto, California L 4–1
- April 26, 2018 vs Oregon at Pac-12 Tournament in Palo Alto, California W 5–0
- April 27, 2018 vs Washington at Pac-12 Tournament in Palo Alto, California L 4–1

=== 2019 Season summary ===
ASU completed the 2019 campaign (21–14) overall, setting a school-record for most wins in a single season. Under Head Coach Brad Keenan, the Sun Devils finished (2–6) at home, (2–4) on the road, (17–4) in neutral site contests, and (3–14) against ranked opponents. Ryan Wrublik was an Assistant Coach and Priscilla Tallman was a Volunteer Assistant Coach. The Maroon and Gold earned a spot the AVCA Beach Volleyball poll in the final two weeks, finishing the year ranked # 20. Kate Baldwin and Samantha Plaster set the school record for most career wins as pairs, along with the single season school record for most wins as pairs. The 2019 roster included: (Bailey Anderson, Emily Anderson, Kate Baldwin, Natalie Braun, Kendall Cady, Katelyn Carballo, Katie Cross, Sierra Ellett, Cierra Flood, Halle Johnson, Tabitha Keever, Ellyson Lundberg, Oluoma Okaro, Samantha Plaster, Maddy Salazar, Californiassidy Schilling, Californiarmen Unzue, Lauren Weintraub, Ashley Wenz, and Kara Woodard).

==== Awards ====
- Kate Baldwin and Samantha Plaster were named to the All-Pac-12 Tournament Team
- Oluoma Okaro received Pac-12 All-Conference 1st Team
- Ashley Wenz earned Pac-12 All-Conference 2nd Team
- Katie Cross claimed Pac-12 All-Academic 1st Team honors
- Ellyson Lundberg received Pac-12 All-Academic 1st Team honors
- Samantha Plaster earned Pac-12 All-Academic 1st Team honors
- Cierra Flood claimed Pac-12 All-Academic 2nd Team honors
- Kate Baldwin received Pac-12 All-Academic Honorable Mention honors
- Katelyn Carballo earned Pac-12 All-Academic Honorable Mention honors
- Oluoma Okaro claimed Pac-12 All-Academic Honorable Mention honors

==== Season results ====
- February 23, 2019 vs # 15 Loyola Marymount in Phoenix, Arizona L 5–0
- February 23, 2019 at # 16 Grand Canyon in Phoenix, Arizona W 3–2
- February 23, 2019 vs New Mexico in Phoenix, Arizona W 5–0
- March 2, 2019 vs # 1 UCLA at Pac-12 South Invitational in Tucson, Arizona L 5–0
- March 2, 2019 vs # 11 California at Pac-12 South Invitational in Tucson, Arizona L 5–0
- March 3, 2019 vs Washington at Pac-12 South Invitational in Tucson, Arizona W 5–0
- March 8, 2019 vs North Florida at Eckerd College Battle on the Bay in St. Petersburg, Florida W 5–0
- March 8, 2019 vs Florida Gulf Coast at Eckerd College Battle on the Bay in St. Petersburg, Florida W 4–1
- March 9, 2019 vs Tennessee-Martin at Eckerd College Battle on the Bay in St. Petersburg, Florida W 5–0
- March 9, 2019 at Eckerd College at Eckerd College Battle on the Bay in St. Petersburg, Florida W 5–0
- March 15, 2019 vs North Florida in Tucson, Arizona W 3–2
- March 15, 2019 at # 15 Arizona in Tucson, Arizona L 3–2
- March 16, 2019 vs New Mexico in Tucson, Arizona W 4–1
- March 16, 2019 vs Louisiana-Monroe in Tucson, Arizona W 3–2
- March 22, 2019 vs # 2 USC at PERA Club in Tempe, Arizona L 4–1
- March 22, 2019 vs # 6 Hawaii at PERA Club in Tempe, Arizona L 5–0
- March 23, 2019 vs # 5 Pepperdine at PERA Club in Tempe, Arizona L 3–2
- March 23, 2019 vs # 6 Hawaii at PERA Club in Tempe, Arizona L 4–1
- March 29, 2019 vs College of Charleston at Diggin' Duals Tournament in Atlanta, Georgia W 4–1
- March 29, 2019 at # 19 Georgia State at Diggin' Duals Tournament in Atlanta, Georgia L 4–1
- March 29, 2019 vs North Carolina Wilmington at Diggin' Duals in Atlanta, Georgia W 4–1
- March 30, 2019 vs UAB at Diggin' Duals Tournament in Atlanta, Georgia W 4–1
- March 31, 2019 at # 11 South Carolina in Columbia, SC L 3–2
- April 6, 2019 vs Utah at PERA Club in Tempe, Arizona W 4–1
- April 6, 2019 vs # 7 Cal Poly at PERA Club in Tempe, Arizona L 3–2
- April 7, 2019 vs Abilene Christian at PERA Club in Tempe, Arizona W 5–0
- April 7, 2019 vs # 14 Arizona at PERA Club in Tempe, Arizona L 4–1
- April 12, 2019 vs Abilene Christian at Kingsville Beach Bash in Kingsville, Texas W 5–0
- April 12, 2019 at Texas A&M Kingsville at Kingsville Beach Bash in Kingsville, Texas W 5–0
- April 13, 2019 vs Abilene Christian at Kingsville Beach Bash in Kingsville, Texas W 5–0
- April 13, 2019 vs Park University at Kingsville Beach Bash in Kingsville, Texas W 5–0
- April 25, 2019 vs # 10 California at Pac-12 Tournament in Los Angeles, California W 3–2
- April 26, 2019 at # 2 USC at Pac-12 Tournament in Los Angeles, California L 3–0
- April 26, 2019 vs # 20 Stanford at Pac-12 Tournament in Los Angeles, California W 3–1
- April 26, 2019 vs # 10 California at Pac-12 Tournament in Los Angeles, California L 3–1

=== 2020 Season summary ===
In their fourth season with Brad Keenan as Head Coach, the Sun Devils finished the 2020 campaign (4–6) overall. ASU finished (0-0) at home, (0–3) on the road, (4–3) in neutral site contests, and (0–6) against ranked opponents. Ryan Wrublik was an Assistant Coach and Whitney Follette was a Volunteer Assistant Coach. The Maroon & Gold were ranked in three of the four weeks, while ending the season ranked # 20 in the AVCA Beach Volleyball poll. The 2020 roster included: (Bailey Anderson, Emily Anderson, Kate Baldwin, Shane Burleson, Kendall Cady, Katelyn Carballo, Monaghan Cromeans, Sierra Ellett, Allyson Eylers, Cierra Flood, Halle Johnson Pasichnuk, Maria Kowal, Ellyson Lundberg, Erin Myers, Samantha Plaster, Maddy Salazar, Matea Suan, Lexi Sweeney, Sarah Waters, Lauren Weintraub, & Kara Woodard).

==== Season results ====
- February 22, 2020 vs San Francisco at Cactus Classic in Tucson, Arizona W 4–1
- February 22, 2020 vs Boise State at Cactus Classic in Tucson, Arizona W 5–0
- February 29, 2020 vs # 5 Hawaii in Palo Alto, California L 5–0
- February 29, 2020 at # 20 Stanford in Palo Alto, California L 4–1
- March 1, 2020 at # 11 California in Berkeley, California L 5–0
- March 1, 2020 vs Pacific in Berkeley, California W 4–1
- March 7, 2020 vs # 2 UCLA at Pac-12 South Invitational in Los Angeles, California L 4–1
- March 7, 2020 vs Utah at Pac-12 South Invitational in Los Angeles, California W 5–0
- March 8, 2020 vs # 11 California at Pac-12 South Invitational in Los Angeles, California L 5–0
- March 8, 2020 vs # 19 Stanford at Pac-12 South Invitational in Los Angeles, California L 3–2
- March 14, 2020 vs North Florida at Carolina Challenge in Columbia, SC: Cancelled due to the COVID-19 pandemic
- March 14, 2020 vs Mercer at Carolina Challenge in Columbia, SC: Cancelled due to the COVID-19 pandemic
- March 15, 2020 vs # 13 Florida International at Carolina Challenge in Columbia, SC: Cancelled due to the COVID-19 pandemic
- March 15, 2020 at # 14 South Carolina at Carolina Challenge in Columbia, SC: Cancelled due to the COVID-19 pandemic
- March 27, 2020 at Texas A&M Corpus Christi at Islanders Classic in Corpus Christi, Texas: Cancelled due to the COVID-19 pandemic
- March 27, 2020 vs Houston Baptist at Islanders Classic in Corpus Christi, Texas: Cancelled due to the COVID-19 pandemic
- March 28, 2020 at Texas A&M Corpus Christi at Islanders Classic in Corpus Christi, Texas: Cancelled due to the COVID-19 pandemic
- March 28, 2020 vs Houston Baptist at Islanders Classic in Corpus Christi, Texas: Cancelled due to the COVID-19 pandemic
- April 1, 2020 vs Long Beach State in Phoenix, Arizona: Cancelled due to the COVID-19 pandemic
- April 4, 2020 in Phoenix, Arizona: Cancelled due to the COVID-19 pandemic
- April 5, 2020 in Phoenix, Arizona: Cancelled due to the COVID-19 pandemic
- April 10, 2020 vs Grand Canyon in Tempe, Arizona: Cancelled due to the COVID-19 pandemic
- April 10, 2020 vs Arizona in Tempe, Arizona: Cancelled due to the COVID-19 pandemic
- April 11, 2020 vs Arizona Christian in Tempe, Arizona: Cancelled due to the COVID-19 pandemic
- April 16, 2020 at Arizona in Tucson, Arizona: Cancelled due to the COVID-19 pandemic
- April 23, 2020 at Pac-12 Tournament in Los Angeles, California: Cancelled due to the COVID-19 pandemic
- April 24, 2020 at Pac-12 Tournament in Los Angeles, California: Cancelled due to the COVID-19 pandemic
- April 25, 2020 at Pac-12 Tournament in Los Angeles, California: Cancelled due to the COVID-19 pandemic

=== 2021 Season summary ===
In their fifth season under Head Coach Brad Keenan, the Sun Devils finished the 2021 campaign (10–12) overall. ASU finished (0–1) at home, (2–3) on the road, (8-8) in neutral site contests, and (1–11) against ranked opponents. Paul Araiza was an Assistant Coach and Katie Cross was a Volunteer Assistant Coach. The Maroon & Gold were ranked in four of the eleven weeks, reaching as high as # 20 in the AVCA Beach Volleyball poll. The 2021 roster included: (Taryn Ames, Bailey Anderson, Emily Anderson, Malina Baker, Lila Bordis, Shane Burleson, Katelyn Carballo, Monaghan Cromeans, Sierra Ellett, Kate Fitzgerald, Cierra Flood, Californiambria Hall, Jensen Kaelin, Maria Kowal, Maia Nichols, Samantha Plaster, Maddy Salazar, Aleksandra Sochacka, Lexi Sweeney, Sarah Waters, Ivey Weber, & Lauren Weintraub).

=== Awards ===
- Samantha Plaster earned Pac-12 Scholar Athlete of the Year
- Katelyn Carballo received Pac-12 All-Conference second Team

=== 2021 Season results ===
- February 26, 2021 vs Colorado Mesa at Canyon Classic in Phoenix, Arizona W 5–0
- February 26, 2021 at # 7 Grand Canyon at Canyon Classic in Phoenix, Arizona L 4–1
- March 6, 2021 vs Boise State at Cactus Classic in Tucson, Arizona L 3–2
- March 6, 2021 vs Stephen F. Austin at Cactus Classic in Tucson, Arizona W 5–0
- March 7, 2021 vs Texas A&M Corpus Christi at Cactus Classic in Tucson, Arizona W 3–2
- March 25, 2021 vs # 18 Stanford in Phoenix, Arizona L 4–1
- March 25, 2021 at # 8 Grand Canyon in Phoenix, Arizona L 4–1
- March 27, 2021 vs Washington at Pac-12 South Tournament in Tucson, Arizona W 4–1
- March 27, 2021 vs # 4 UCLA at Pac-12 South Tournament in Tucson, Arizona L 5–0
- March 28, 2021 vs # 18 Stanford at Pac-12 South Tournament in Tucson, Arizona L 4–1
- March 28, 2021 at # 14 Arizona at Pac-12 South Tournament in Tucson, Arizona L 4–1
- April 10, 2021 at # 1 UCLA at Pac-12 North Tournament in Phoenix, Arizona L 5–0
- April 10, 2021 at # 11 California at Pac-12 North Tournament in Phoenix, Arizona W 3–2
- April 11, 2021 at Washington at Pac-12 North Tournament in Phoenix, Arizona W 3–2
- April 11, 2021 at # 2 USC at Pac-12 North Tournament in Phoenix, Arizona L 5–0
- April 16, 2021 at Boise State at Boise State Beach Classic in Boise, Idahoe W 5–0
- April 16, 2021 vs Utah at Boise State Beach Classic in Boise, Idahoe W 5–0
- April 17, 2021 at Boise State at Boise State Beach Classic in Boise, Idahoe W 4–1
- April 22, 2021 vs # 9 Arizona in Phoenix, Arizona L 4–1
- April 29, 2021 at # 8 Arizona at Pac-12 Tournament in Los Angeles, California L 3–0
- April 30, 2021 at Washington at Pac-12 Tournament in Los Angeles, California W 3–2
- April 30, 2021 at # 9 Stanford at Pac-12 Tournament in Los Angeles, California L 3–1

=== 2022 Season summary ===
In their sixth season under Head Coach Brad Keenan, the Sun Devils finished the 2022 campaign (17–15) overall. ASU finished (4–2) at home, (1–4) on the road, (12–9) in neutral site contests, and (2–14) against ranked opponents. Paul Araiza was an Assistant Coach. The 2022 roster included: (Taryn Ames, Malina Baker, Katie Blomberg, Lila Bordis, Shane Burleson, Katie Fitzgerald, Cierra Flood, Californiambria Hall, Rylie Kael, Jensen Kaelin, Maria Kowal, Maia Nichols, Anya Pemberton, Maddy Salazar, Lillie Seymour, Lexi Sweeney, Sarah Waters, Ivey Weber, Lauren Weintraub, Kylie Wickley, & Kaitlyn Winkelman).

=== 2022 Season results ===
- February 25, 2022 vs Boise State at Canyon Classic in Phoenix, Arizona L 3–2
- February 25, 2022 at # 9 Grand Canyon at Canyon Classic in Phoenix, Arizona L 4–1
- March 4, 2022 vs Colorado Mesa at Cactus Classic in Tucson, Arizona W 4–1
- March 4, 2022 vs Santa Clara at Cactus Classic in Tucson, Arizona W 4–1
- March 5, 2022 vs # 9 Hawaii at Cactus Classic in Tucson, Arizona L 5–0
- March 5, 2022 vs Boise State at Cactus Classic in Tucson, Arizona W 3–2
- March 8, 2022 vs Benedictine University in Tempe, Arizona W 5–0
- March 8, 2022 vs # 13 Arizona in Tempe, Arizona W 3–2
- March 11, 2022 vs San Jose State at Cal Poly Tournament in San Luis Obispo, California W 5–0
- March 11, 2022 vs Washington at Cal Poly Tournament in San Luis Obispo, California W 4–1
- March 12, 2022 vs # 6 Loyola Marymount at Cal Poly Tournament in San Luis Obispo, California L 5–0
- March 12, 2022 at # 11 Cal Poly at Cal Poly Tournament in San Luis Obispo, California L 5–0
- March 18, 2022 vs Texas A&M Corpus Christi at Fight in the Fort in Fort Worth, Texas W 4–1
- March 18, 2022 at # 3 TCU at Fight in the Forth in Fort Worth, Texas L 5–0
- March 19, 2022 vs Louisiana-Monroe at Fight in the Fort in Fort Worth, Texas W 5–0
- March 19, 2022 vs New Orleans at Fight in the Fort in Fort Worth, Texas W 3–2
- March 24, 2022 vs # 7 Grand Canyon in Tempe, Arizona L 5–0
- March 24, 2022 vs # 8 Stanford in Tempe, Arizona L 5–0
- March 26, 2022 vs # 11 California at Pac-12 South Tournament in Tucson, Arizona L 5–0
- March 26, 2022 vs # 3 USC at Pac-12 South Tournament in Tucson, Arizona L 4–1
- March 27, 2022 vs # 8 Stanford at Pac-12 South Tournament in Tucson, Arizona L 5–0
- March 27, 2022 at # 17 Arizona at Pac-12 South Tournament in Tucson, Arizona L 3–2
- April 9, 2022 vs Oregon at Pac-12 North Tournament in Palo Alto, California W 3–2
- April 9, 2022 vs # 3 UCLA at Pac-12 North Tournament in Palo Alto, California L 5–0
- April 10, 2022 vs Utah at Pac-12 North Tournament in Palo Alto, California W 5–0
- April 10, 2022 vs Washington at Pac-12 North Tournament in Palo Alto, California W 3–2
- April 15, 2022 vs Ottawa University in Tempe, Arizona W 5–0
- April 15, 2022 vs Park University in Tempe, Arizona W 4–1
- April 27, 2022 vs # 8 Stanford at Pac-12 Tournament in Tucson, Arizona L 3–0
- April 28, 2022 vs Washington at Pac-12 Tournament in Tucson, Arizona W 3–0
- April 28, 2022 at # 17 Arizona at Pac-12 Tournament in Tucson, Arizona W 3–1
- April 29, 2022 vs # 12 California at Pac-12 Tournament in Tucson, Arizona L 3–0

=== 2023 Season summary ===
In their seventh season under Head Coach Brad Keenan, the Sun Devils finished the 2023 campaign (11–13) overall. ASU finished (3–1) at home, (1–3) on the road, (7–9) in neutral site contests, and (2–12) against ranked opponents. Paul Araiza was an Assistant Coach and Connor Boyles was a Volunteer Assistant Coach. The 2023 roster included: (Taryn Ames, Katie Blomberg, MayaMay Brown, Shane Burleson, Kate Fitzgerald, Rylie Kael, Jensen Kaelin, Maria Kowal, Ava Lewison-German, Adriana Nieves Papaleo, Anya Pemberton, Lillie Seymour, Lexi Sweeney, Carys Thomas, Sarah Waters, Ivey Weber, Kendall Whitmarsh, Kylie Wickley, and Kaitlyn Winkelman).

=== Awards ===
Lexi Sweeney received Pac-12 All-Conference 2nd Team.

=== 2023 Season results ===
February 24, 2023 vs Oregon at Cactus Classic in Phoenix, AZ W 4–1

February 24, 2023 vs Boise State at Cactus Classic in Phoenix, AZ L 3–2

February 25, 2023 vs Colorado Mesa at Cactus Classic in Phoenix, AZ W 4–1

February 25, 2023 vs UTEP at Cactus Classic in Phoenix, AZ W 5–0

March 4, 2023 vs Utah at Pac-12 South Tournament in Los Angeles, CA W 4–1

March 4, 2023 at # 1 UCLA at Pac-12 South Tournament in Los Angeles, CA L 5–0

March 5, 2023 vs # 7 Stanford at Pac-12 South Tournament in Los Angeles, CA L 3–2

March 17, 2023 vs # 18 Pepperdine at Canyon Classic in Phoenix, AZ L 4–1

March 18, 2023 vs UC-Davis at Canyon Classic in Phoenix, AZ W 3–2

March 18, 2023 at # 7 Grand Canyon at Canyon Classic in Phoenix, AZ L 5–0

March 25, 2023 vs # 11 Georgia State at Gamecock Grand Slam in Columbia, SC L 5–0

March 25, 2023 at # 16 South Carolina at Gamecock Grand Slam in Columbia, SC L 4–1

March 26, 2023 vs Houston Christian at Gamecock Grand Slam in Columbia, SC W 3–2

March 29, 2023 vs #18 Arizona in Tempe, AZ W 3–2

April 7, 2023 vs Oregon at Pac-12 North Tournament in Palo Alto, CA W 3–2

April 7, 2023 vs # 2 USC at Pac-12 North Tournament in Palo Alto, CA L 5–0

April 8, 2023 vs # 9 California at Pac-12 North Tournament in Palo Alto, CA L 4–1

April 8, 2023 vs # 13 Washington at Pac-12 North Tournament in Palo Alto, CA L 3–2

April 14, 2023 vs Utah in Tempe, AZ W 5–0

April 14, 2023 vs # 7 Grand Canyon in Tempe, AZ L 3–2

April 15, 2023 vs Park University in Tempe, AZ W 5–0

April 21, 2023 at Arizona in Tucson, AZ W 3–2

April 26, 2023 vs # 9 California at Pac-12 Championships in Palo Alto, CA L 3–0

April 27, 2023 vs # 20 Arizona at Pac-12 Championships in Palo Alto, CA L 3–1

=== 2024 Season summary ===
In their first season under Head Coach Kristen Rohr Glattfelder, the Sun Devils finished the 2024 campaign (21-10) overall. ASU finished (7-4) at home, (2-4) on the road, (12-2) in neutral site contests, and (11-10) against ranked opponents. Paul Araiza and Abbie Hughes were Assistant Coaches. The Maroon & Gold were ranked for all 11 weeks, reaching as high as # 10 in the AVCA Beach Volleyball poll. The 2024 roster included: (Taryn Ames, Annalyse Askew, Arden Besecker, Kate Fitzgerald, Ava Haughy, Hayden Huber, Rylie Kael, Daniella Kensinger, Ava Kirunchyk, Ava Lewison-German, Samaya Morin, Adriana Nieves Papaleo, Anya Pemberton, Lillie Seymour, Elsa Snipes, Lexi Sweeney, Carys Thomas, Ivey Weber, Kendall Whitmarsh, Ava Williamson, and Deanie Woodruff).

=== Awards ===
Head Coach Kristen Rohr Glattfelder was named Pac-12 Coach of the Year.

Daniella Kensinger earned Pac-12 All-Conference 1st Team.

Daniella Kensinger received AVCA 2nd Team All-American honors.

Ava Williams earned AVCA 2nd Team All-American honors.

=== 2024 Season results ===
February 23, 2024 vs # 12 Georgia State at Tampa Invitational in Tampa, FL W 3-2

February 23, 2024 at Tampa at Tampa Invitational in Tampa, FL W 4-1

February 24, 2024 vs # 17 South Carolina at Tampa Invitational in Tampa, FL W 4-1

February 24, 2024 vs # 11 Florida Atlantic at Tampa Invitational in Tampa, FL W 3-2

March 1, 2024 vs Colorado Mesa at Sun Devil Invitational in Tempe, AZ W 5-0

March 2, 2024 vs Texas A&M-Kingsville at Sun Devil Invitational in Tempe, AZ W 5-0

March 8, 2024 vs # 1 UCLA at Pac-12 South Tournament in Tempe, AZ L 5-0

March 8, 2024 vs # 2 Stanford at Pac-12 South Invitational in Tempe, AZ W 3-2

March 10, 2024 vs # 7 California at Pac-12 South Invitational in Tempe, AZ L 3-2

March 10, 2024 vs # 19 Arizona at Pac-12 South Invitational in Tempe, AZ W 3-2

March 15, 2024 vs Pepperdine at LBSU Tournament in Long Beach, CA W 4-1

March 15, 2024 at # 7 Long Beach State at LBSU Tournament in Long Beach, CA L 3-2

March 16, 2024 vs Cal State Northridge at LBSU Tournament in Long Beach, CA W 5-0

March 16, 2024 vs Texas at LBSU Tournament in Long Beach, CA W 3-2

March 22, 2024 vs Florida Gulf Coast at Fight in the Fort in Fort Worth, TX W 4-1

March 22, 2024 vs # 14 Washington at Fight in the Fort in Fort Worth, TX W 3-2

March 23, 2024 vs # 13 Florida International at Fight in the Fort in Fort Worth, TX W 4-1

March 23, 2024 at # 4 TCU at Fight in the Fort in Fort Worth, TX L 3-2

March 30, 2024 vs # 18 Stetson at Lopes Invitational in Phoenix, AZ W 4-1

March 30, 2024 at # 16 Grand Canyon at Lopes Invitational in Phoenix, AZ W 4-1

April 5, 2024 vs # 3 USC at Pac-12 North Tournament in Seattle, WA L 4-1

April 5, 2024 at # 13 Washington at Pac-12 North Tournament in Seattle, WA L 3-2

April 6, 2024 vs Utah at Pac-12 North Tournament in Seattle, WA W 5-0

April 6, 2024 vs Oregon at Pac-12 North Tournament in Seattle, WA W 5-0

April 18, 2024 at # 19 Arizona in Tucson, AZ L 3-2

April 19, 2024 vs Ottawa University in Tempe, AZ W 5-0

April 24, 2024 vs # 3 Stanford at Pac-12 Championships in Tempe, AZ L 3-0

April 25, 2024 vs # 18 Arizona at Pac-12 Championships in Tempe, AZ W 3-0

April 25, 2024 vs # 8 California at Pac-12 Championships in Tempe, AZ W 3-2

April 26, 2024 vs # 3 Stanford at Pac-12 Championships in Tempe, AZ L 3-1

May 3, 2024 vs # 6 Cal Poly at NCAA Championships in Gulf Shores, AL L 3-0

=== 2025 Season summary ===
In their second season under Head Coach Kristen Glattfelder, the Sun Devils finished the 2025 campaign (22-14). ASU finished (9-1) at home, (2-1) on the road, (11-12) in neutral site contests, and (7-14) against ranked opponents. Paul Araiza and Abbie Hughes were Assistant Coaches. The Maroon & Gold were ranked for all 11 weeks, reaching as high as # 10 in the AVCA Beach Volleyball poll. The 2025 roster included: (Lucci Alexander, Annalyse Askew, Arden Besecker, Tori Clement, Ava Haughy, Kastyn Hoffman, Daniella Kensinger, Ava Kirunchyk, Olivia McElroy, Kaydon Meyers, Samaya Morin, Anya Pemberton, Lillie Seymour, Elsa Snipes, Zoe Taylor, Carys Thomas, Kendall Whitmarsh, Layla Williams, and Ava Williamson).

=== Awards ===
Samaya Morin earned AVCA 2nd Team All-American honors.

=== 2025 Season results ===
February 20th, 2025 at # 12 Hawaii at Outrigger Duke Kahanamoku Classic in Honolulu,, HI W 5-0

February 20th, 2025 vs # 3 UCLA at Outrigger Duke Kahanamoku Classic in Honolulu, HI L 4-1

February 21st, 2025 vs # 1 USC at Outrigger Duke Kahanamoku Classic in Honolulu, HI L 5-0

February 21st, 2025 vs # 2 TCU at Outrigger Duke Kahanamoku Classic in Honolulu, HI L 4-1

February 22nd, 2025 vs # 7 Loyola Marymount at Outrigger Duke Kahanamoku Classic in Honolulu, HI L 5-0

February 22nd, 2025 vs # 5 Stanford at Outrigger Duke Kahanamoku Classic in Honolulu, HI L 5-0

February 28th, 2025 vs Boise State at Cactus Classic in Tucson, AZ W 3-2

February 28th, 2025 vs # 20 Stetson at Cactus Classic in Tucson, AZ W 4-1

March 1st, 2025 vs Oregon at Cactus Classic in Tucson, AZ W 5-0

March 1st, 2025 vs # 18 Grand Canyon at Cactus Classic in Tucson, AZ W 3-2

March 7th, 2025 vs Texas A&M Corpus-Christi in Tempe, AZ W 4-1

March 7th, 2025 vs Coastal Carolina in Tempe, AZ W 5-0

March 8th, 2025 vs # 6 Cal Poly in Tempe, AZ L 4-1

March 21st, 2025 vs # 20 Florida International at East Meets West in Austin, TX W 3-2

March 21st, 2025 vs # 18 Georgia State at East Meets West in Austin, TX W 4-1

March 22nd, 2025 vs # 12 LSU at East Meets West in Austin, TX L 3-2

March 22nd, 2025 at # 10 Texas at East Meets West in Austin, TX L 4-1

March 26th, 2025 vs Arizona in Tempe, AZ W 5-0

March 28th, 2025 vs UAB at ASU/GCU Invitational in Tempe, AZ W 5-0

March 28th, 2025 vs # 19 Washington at ASU/GCU Invitational in Tempe, AZ W 4-1

March 29th, 2025 vs UTEP at ASU/GCU Invitational in Tempe, AZ W 5-0

March 29th, 2025 vs South Carolina at ASU/GCU Invitational in Tempe, AZ W 4-1

April 4th, 2025 vs Pepperdine at Wildcat Spring Challenge in Tucson, AZ W 3-2

April 4th, 2025 at Arizona at Wildcat Spring Challenge in Tucson, AZ W 4-1

April 5th, 2025 vs # 1 TCU at Wildcat Spring Challenge in Tucson, AZ L 3-2

April 5th, 2025 vs Utah at Wildcat Spring Challenge in Tucson, AZ W 5-0

April 11th, 2025 vs # 1 TCU at COE Challenge in San Luis Obispo, CA L 4-1

April 11th, 2025 vs # 2 UCLA at COE Challenge in San Luis Obispo, CA L 5-0

April 12th 2025 vs # 4 Loyola Marymount at COE Challenge in San Luis Obispo, CA L 4-1

April 12th, 2025 vs # 7 Florida State at COE Challenge in San Luis Obispo, CA W 3-2

April 19th, 2025 vs Benedictine University at Mesa in Tempe, AZ W 5-0

April 19th, 2025 vs UTEP in Tempe, AZ W 5-0

April 24th, 2025 vs Arizona at Big 12 Championships in Fort Worth, TX W 3-0

April 24th, 2025 at # 2 TCU at Big 12 Championships in Fort Worth, TX L 3-0

April 25th, 2025 vs Utah at Big 12 Championships in Fort Worth, TX W 3-1

April 25th, 2025 at # 2 TCU at Big 12 Championships in Fort Worth, TX L 3-2

=== 2026 Season summary ===
In their third season under Head Coach Kristen Glattfelder, the Sun Devils finished the 2026 campaign (18-15). ASU finished (7-1) at home, (2-4) on the road, (9-10) in neutral site contests, and (10-15) against ranked opponents. Paul Araiza and Josh Roper were Assistant Coaches. The Maroon & Gold were ranked for all 11 weeks, reaching as high as # 8 in the AVCA Beach Volleyball poll. The 2026 roster included: (Arden Besecker, Tori Clement, McKenna Flaherty, Kristin Gilmour, Tatum Hemenway, Reagan Hope, Daniella Kensinger, Ava Kirunchyk, Olivia McElroy, Emma McSorley, Kaydon Meyers, Samaya Morin, Harper Nelson, Zoe Taylor, Addy White, Kendall Whitmarsh, and Layla Williams).

=== Awards ===
Ava Kirunchyk earned AVCA 2nd Team All-American honors.

Samaya Morin received AVCA 2nd Team All-American honors.

Ava Kirunchyk was named to the All-Big 12 Team.

Samaya Morin was named to the All-Big 12 Team.

=== Season Results ===
February 20th, 2026 vs UC-Davis at Canyon Classic in Phoenix, AZ W 5-0

February 20th 2026 vs # 5 TCU at Canyon Classic in Phoenix, AZ W 4-1

February 21st, 2026 vs Colorado Mesa at Canyon Classic in Phoenix, AZ W 5-0

February 21st, 2026 at # 13 Grand Canyon at Canyon Classic in Phoenix, AZ W 5-0

February 27th, 2026 vs # 19 Georgia State at Cactus Classic in Tucson, AZ W 5-0

February 27th, 2026 at # 20 Arizona at Cactus Classic in Tucson, AZ W 5-0

March 6th, 2026 vs Nebraska at Sun Devil Classic in Tempe, AZ W 5-0

March 6th, 2026 vs # 19 Arizona at Sun Devil Classic in Tempe, AZ W 3-2

March 7th, 2026 vs Southern Mississippi at Sun Devil Classic in Tempe, AZ W 5-0

March 7th, 2026 vs Stephen F. Austin at Sun Devil Classic in Tempe, AZ W 5-0

March 13th, 2026 vs # 1 UCLA at East Meets West Invitational in Manhattan Beach, CA L 5-0

March 13th, 2026 vs # 10 California at East Meets West Invitational in Manhattan Beach, CA L 4-1

March 14th, 2026 vs # 9 Loyola Marymount at East Meets West Invitational in Manhattan Beach, CA L 3-2

March 14th, 2026 vs # 13 Hawaii at East Meets West Invitational in Manhattan Beach, CA W 4-1

March 20th, 2026 vs Georgia State at Death Volley Invitational in Baton Rouge, LA W 4-1

March 20th, 2026 vs # 4 Texas at Death Volley Invitational in Baton Rouge, LA L 5-0

March 21st, 2026 vs # 6 Florida State at Death Volley Invitational in Baton Rouge, LA L 4-1

March 21st, 2026 at # 12 LSU at Death Volley Invitational in Baton Rouge, LA L 3-2

March 27th, 2026 vs # 19 South Carolina at Big 12 Preview in Fort Worth, TX L 3-2

March 27th, 2026 vs # 7 TCU at Big 12 Preview in Fort Worth, TX L 5-0

March 28th, 2026 vs # 20 Arizona at Big 12 Preview in Fort Worth, TX W 5-0

April 3rd, 2026 vs Ottawa University at Sparky Invitational in Tempe, AZ W 5-0

April 3rd, 2026 vs # 13 Grand Canyon at Sparky Invitational in Tempe, AZ L 3-2

April 4th, 2026 vs Florida International at Sparky Invitational in Tempe, AZ W 5-0

April 4th, 2026 vs # 15 Stetson at Sparky Invitational in Tempe, AZ W 4-1

April 10th, 2026 vs # 9 California at Center of Effort Challenge in San Luis Obispo, CA L 4-1

April 10th, 2026 at # 6 Cal Poly at Center of Effort Challenge in San Luis Obispo, CA L 4-1

April 11th, 2026 vs # 2 UCLA at Center of Effort Challenge in San Luis Obispo, CA L 5-0

April 11th, 2026 vs # 7 Loyola Marymount at Center of Effort Challenge in San Luis Obispo, CA W 3-2

April 17th, 2026 at # 10 Long Beach State in Long Beach, CA L 3-2

April 23rd, 2026 at # 20 Arizona at Big 12 Championships in Tucson, AZ W 4-1

April 23rd, 2026 at # 9 TCU at Big 12 Championships in Tucson, AZ L 4-1

April 24th, 2026 at # 18 Boise State at Big 12 Championships in Tucson, AZ L 3-2

== Home court/practice and training facilities ==
Completed in February 2022, ASU opened their new Sun Devil Beach Volleyball Facility on the Tempe campus. It cost $1.2 million and includes four courts. It's located just East of the Alberta B. Farrington Softball Stadium.

Home matches were originally hosted at the PERA Club, which is located on 1 E. Continental Dr. Tempe, Arizona 85281. The PERA Club (short for Project Employees Recreation Association) is a private country club for employees and families of the Salt River Project, the major water and power utility in Phoenix and surrounding cities. It now holds three volleyball courts after completing major renovations to accommodate the Sun Devil beach volleyball team.

== See also ==
- List of NCAA women's beach volleyball programs
