= Arizona State Sun Devils =

Intercollegiate sports teams of Arizona State University

- University: Arizona State University
- NCAA: Division I (FBS)
- Conference: Big 12 (primary); National Collegiate Hockey Conference (ice hockey); Mountain Pacific Sports Federation (indoor track and water polo)
- Athletic director: Graham Rossini
- Location: Tempe, Arizona
- Varsity teams: 26
- Football stadium: Mountain America Stadium
- Basketball arena: Desert Financial Arena
- Ice hockey arena: Mullett Arena
- Baseball stadium: Phoenix Municipal Stadium
- Colors: Maroon and gold
- Mascot: Sparky
- Fight song: "Maroon & Gold"
- Website: sundevils.com

Big 12 logo in Arizona State colors

The Arizona State Sun Devils are the athletic teams that represent Arizona State University. ASU has nine men's and eleven women's varsity teams competing at the National Collegiate Athletic Association (NCAA) Division I level as a member of the Big 12 Conference. The mascot was adopted in 1946; earlier nicknames were the Normals and later, the Bulldogs. The Sun Devil mascot, Sparky, was designed by Bert Anthony, a former Disney illustrator. ASU's chief rival is the University of Arizona Wildcats, and both universities' athletics departments compete against each other in the Territorial Cup Series.

On August 4, 2023, Arizona State accepted an invite to join the Big 12 Conference, effective August 2, 2024.

== Athletic achievements ==
ASU has 25 NCAA team national championships, including baseball (five times), women's tennis (three times), men's gymnastics (one), men's track and field (one), men's indoor track and field (one), women's outdoor track and field (two times), women's indoor track and field (one), wrestling (one), men's golf (two times), women's golf (eight times), softball (two times), and men's swimming and diving (one). ASU also has numerous individual NCAA national champions in different sports. Additionally, the baseball team has appeared in the College World Series 22 times, the men's basketball team has participated in 13 NCAA tournaments, and the ASU football team won the Rose Bowl in 1987 and the Fiesta Bowl in 1971, 1972, 1973, 1975, and 1982.

ASU varsity teams won national championships in men's archery 15 times, women's archery 21 times, mixed archery 20 times, men's badminton 13 times, women's badminton 17 times, mixed badminton 10 times and triathlon four times, all of which are not recognized by the NCAA.

After NCAA violations from the Sun Devil football team in 2024, ASU became the most-penalized school in NCAA history with ten major infractions.

== Sports ==
Men's sports	Women's sports
Baseball	Basketball
Basketball	Beach volleyball
Cross country	Cross country
Football	Golf
Golf	Gymnastics
Ice hockey	Lacrosse
Swimming and diving	Soccer
Tennis	Softball
Track and field^{†}	Swimming and diving
Wrestling	Tennis
	Triathlon
	Track and field^{†}
	Volleyball
	Water polo
† – Track and field includes both indoor and outdoor

Arizona State University sponsors teams in 11 men's and 15 women's NCAA sanctioned sports, following the 2015 elevation of the men's ice hockey club team to varsity status. In the fall of 2015, Arizona State announced the addition of women's triathlon and women's lacrosse. Triathlon began competition in the fall of 2016, with lacrosse starting competition in the spring of 2018. In spring 2016, ASU announced the reinstatement of men's tennis, which had been dropped after the 2007–08 school year.

=== Football ===
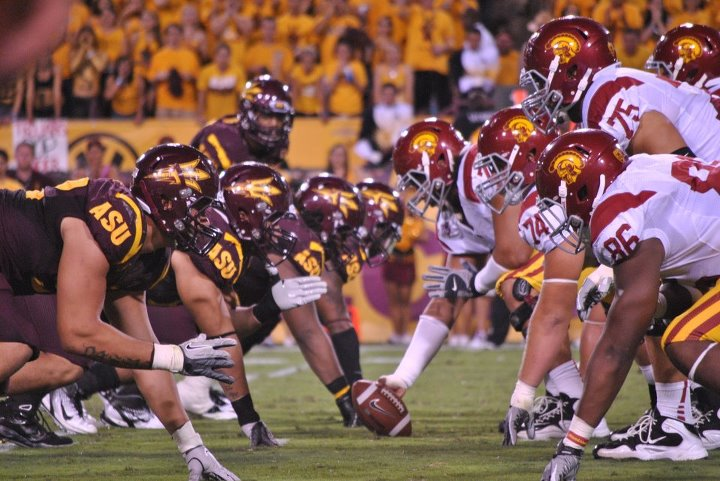
Arizona State football team in September 2011

The Sun Devils played in the Border Conference between 1931 and 1961, before joining the Western Athletic Conference. Led by head coach Frank Kush, the Sun Devils posted a 64–9 record between 1970 and 1975, culminating in a 17–14 upset of the Nebraska Cornhuskers in the 1975 Fiesta Bowl.

After the 2006 season, Dirk Koetter was fired after six seasons, and on December 6, 2006, athletic director Lisa Love hired Dennis Erickson to become the head coach at ASU. Erickson, in his first year as coach of the Arizona State Sun Devils, led the team to 10 wins, a share of the Pac-10 title with USC, and the Holiday Bowl against the University of Texas Longhorns. Erickson was fired on November 28, 2011, after five seasons with the Sun Devils. He was replaced by coach Todd Graham on December 14, 2011. Love was fired from her position as vice president for University Athletics and athletics director on March 28, 2012, and was immediately replaced by Steve Patterson. The athletic director from 2014-2023 was Ray Anderson, who selected former NFL player and coach Herm Edwards to replace Graham as Arizona State's head coach in 2018.

In Edwards’ first season in 2018, the Sun Devils went 5–1 at home including two Top-15 upsets over Michigan State and Utah. After a string of poor performances, Edwards was fired just 3 games into the 2022 season. He was replaced by Sun Devil alumnus Kenny Dillingham on November 26, 2022. Anderson stepped down from his position as athletic director on November 13, 2023 and was replaced by Graham Rossini.

Notable football alumni include Terrell Suggs, Jim Jeffcoat, Mike Pagel, Jake Plummer, Todd Heap, J.R. Redmond, Danny White, Randall McDaniel, David Fulcher, Darren Woodson, Pat Tillman, Eric Allen, Zach Miller, Shaun McDonald, John Jefferson, Paul Justin, Jimmy Verdon, Mike Haynes, Al Harris, Vontaze Burfict, Ryan Torain, Brock Osweiler, Jaelen Strong, Curley Culp and N'Keal Harry.

=== Men's basketball ===
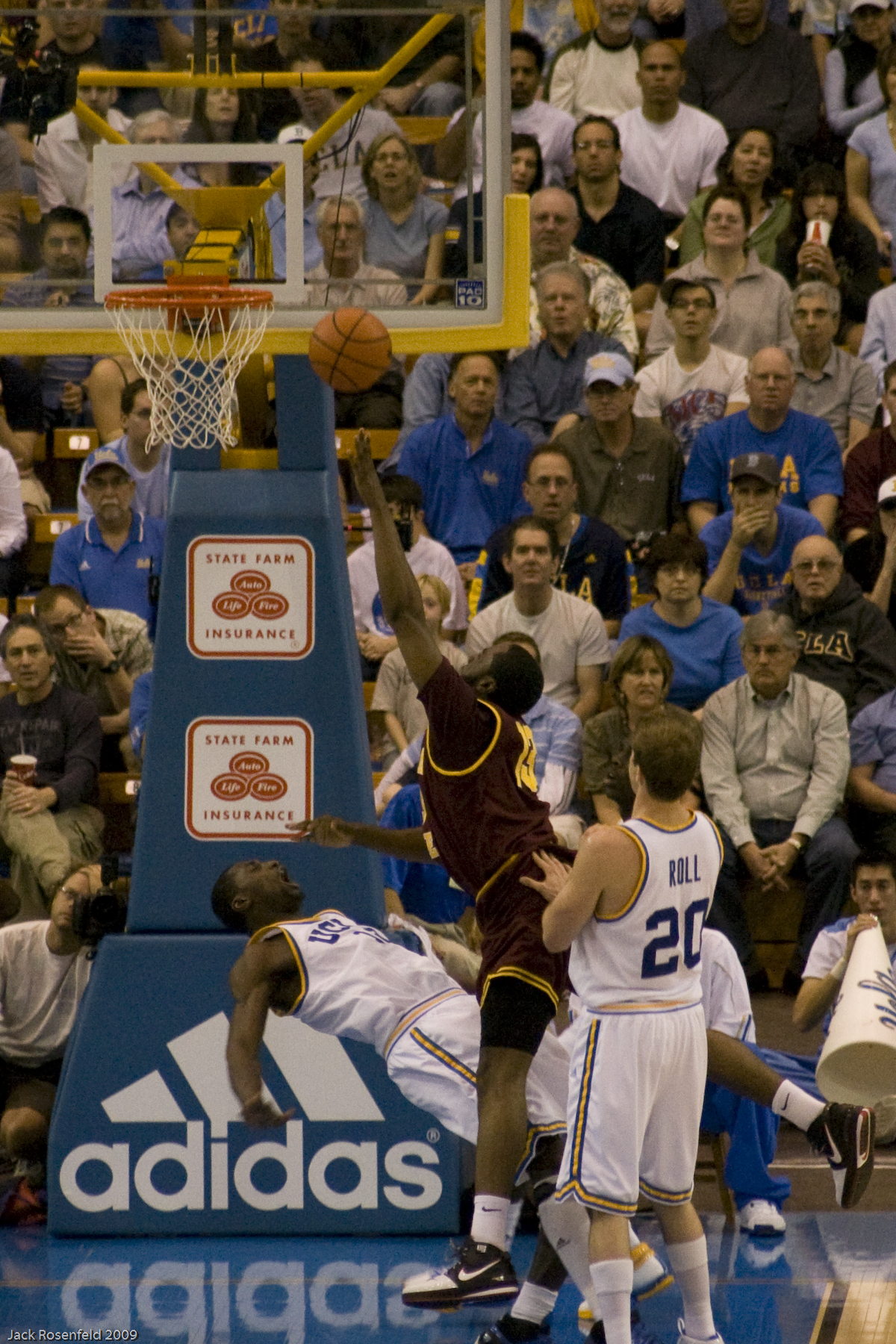
James Harden makes contact with Alfred Aboya inside.

The Arizona State Sun Devils have appeared in the NCAA tournament 17 times, including 3 Elite Eights (1961, 1963, 1975). They have won 8 conference championships (4 WAC and 4 BOR) and finished in the final AP rankings 7 times. The highest national ranking the Sun Devils have achieved was No. 3 under Ned Wulk during the 1980–81 season when the starting lineup included Byron Scott, Fat Lever, and Alton Lister. Ned Wulk was the men's basketball coach from 1958 to 1982 and remains the most successful coach in the history of the program with a record of 406 – 272 (.599).

Arizona State appeared in the NAIA Men's Basketball National Tournament two years (1948 and 1953). In both years they lost in the second round, leaving the NAIA with a tournament record of 2–2.

Herb Sendek stepped down as head coach of the North Carolina State Wolfpack and accepted the head coaching job at Arizona State in 2006. Sendek took the Wolfpack to five consecutive NCAA Tournaments and also won ACC coach of the year in 2004. Sendek was credited for bringing a "basketball atmosphere" and level of excitement to the ASU campus that had been absent for years. In his first four seasons at ASU, Sendek led the Sun Devils to three consecutive 20 win seasons, the 2009 Pac-10 conference tournament finals, and the second round of the NCAA tournament.

Bobby Hurley was the next head coach of the Sun Devils, leading Arizona State to a 12–0 non-conference record in 2017, and a signature win over the #1 ranked Kansas Jayhawks on December 22, 2018 – the first win over a top ranked team at home in program history. During his 11 seasons in Tempe, Hurley secured 15 victories over ranked teams, including 9 wins over top 15 teams.

Thirty-six ASU Sun Devils have been selected in the NBA draft, including future NBA Most Valuable Player James Harden, Byron Scott, Isaac Austin, Mark Landsberger, Lafayette Lever, Alton Lister, Lionel Hollins, Sam Williams, Jeff Ayres (known as Jeff Pendergraph when he played at ASU), Stevin "Hedake" Smith, Mario Bennett, Tommy Smith, Ike Diogu, Eddie House. Freddie Lewis, and Joe Caldwell. Paul Stovall was a Charles Barkley type standout with a dominating presence on the court but his non-conducive actions off the court limited his notoriety.

=== Baseball ===
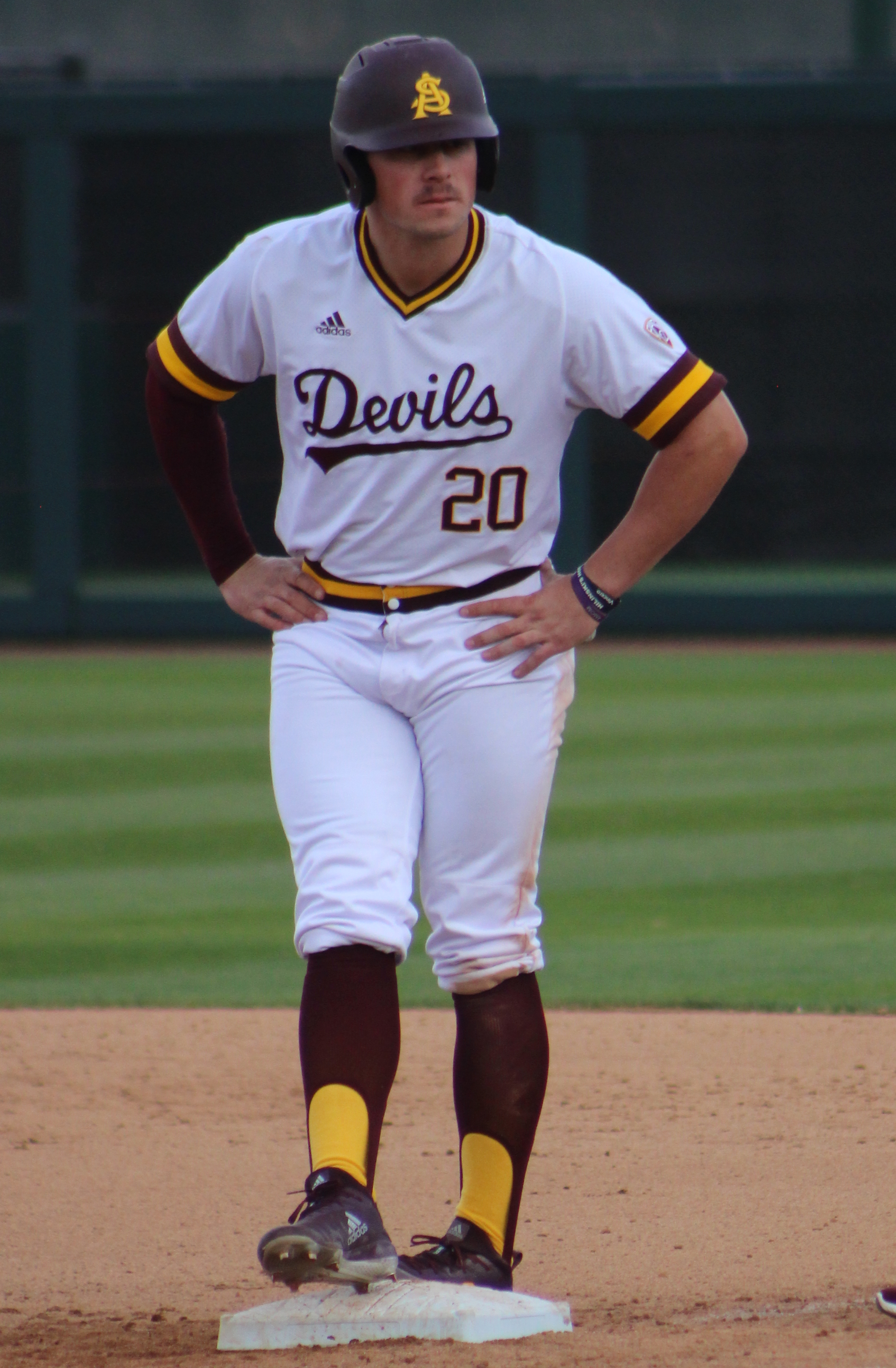
Spencer Torkelson, first overall pick in the 2020 Major League Baseball draft

ASU has one of the most successful baseball programs in the country. The Sun Devils have won five national championships (1965, 1967, 1969, 1977, 1981), the fourth most by any school, and have the third most College World Series victories with 61.

ASU baseball has won 21 conference championships (including four consecutive Pac-10 titles from 2007 to 2010) and reached the College World Series 22 times. The Sun Devils have also reached the NCAA tournament 43 times, most recently in 2026.

Starting with Rick Monday as the No. 1 pick of the first ever Major League Baseball draft in '65, ASU leads all schools with 477 total picks. ASU also has the third most alumni to ever play in Major League Baseball. Baseball alumni include Barry Bonds, Paul Lo Duca, Fernando Viña, Dustin Pedroia, Mike Leake, Andre Ethier, Willie Bloomquist, Bob Horner, Sal Bando, Ike Davis, Jason Kipnis, Brett Wallace, Ian Kinsler, Hubie Brooks, Hunter Bishop, and Hall of Famer Reggie Jackson.

=== Women's basketball ===
The Arizona State Sun Devils have appeared in the NCAA tournament 18 times, including 7 Sweet Sixteens (1982, 1983, 2005, 2007, 2009, 2015, 2019) and 2 Elite Eights (2007, 2009). They have produced WNBA talent such as Kym Hampton, Briann January, Dymond Simon, Monique Ambers, Promise Amukamara, Amanda Levens, Sophie Brunner, Emily Westerberg, and more. Under head coach Charli Turner Thorne, the program became one of the best in the country. She is the winningest coach in ASU history, leading the Sun Devils to two conference championships and 14 NCAA Tournaments in her tenure. During the (2025-2026) season, Head Coach Molly Miller set the school record for best start in program history (15-0) and most wins by a coach in their 1st season with 24 wins. Coach Miller helped lead Arizona State to the NCAA First Four, marking the program's 1st tournament appearance since 2019.

=== Beach volleyball ===
Arizona State began their Sand Volleyball program in 2014. It officially became an NCAA Championship sport in 2016, as they changed the sport's name to Beach Volleyball. ASU is one of nine schools to play Beach Volleyball in the Pac-12 Conference, along with Arizona, California, Stanford, Oregon, UCLA, USC, Utah, and Washington. In their first four seasons, the Sun Devils have had three head coaches. Jason Watson led ASU for two seasons from 2014 to 2015, Jackie Bunker for one season in 2016, Brad Keenan for seven seasons from 2017 to 2023, and Kristen Rohr starting in 2024. In 2024, the Sand Devils earned their 1st NCAA Tournament appearance in program history.

Completed in February 2022, ASU opened their new Sun Devil Beach Volleyball Facility on the Tempe campus. It cost $1.2 million and includes four courts. It is located just East of the Alberta B. Farrington Softball Stadium.

Home matches were originally hosted at the PERA Club, which is located on 1 E. Continental Drive in Tempe. The PERA Club (short for Project Employees Recreation Association) is a private country club for employees and families of the Salt River Project, the major water and power utility in Phoenix and surrounding cities. It holds three volleyball courts after completing major renovations to accommodate the Sun Devil Volleyball team.

=== Gymnastics ===
Led by 30+ year coach John Spini, the Sun Devils women's Gymnastics team had many strong years over his reign with many all-American Gymnasts to Spinis credit as well as a facility named after him. Below is the history of top qualifiers coach has had as well as his predecessors at ASU.

Jean-Luc Cairon served as an assistant coach for the women's gymnastics team.

Jay Santos has been the head coach for Sun Devil Gymnastics since 2017.

=== Lacrosse ===
Arizona State University began their Women's Lacrosse program during the 2018 season. ASU is one of fourteen schools to have played Women's Lacrosse in the Pac-12 Conference, along with California, Colorado, Oregon, Stanford, and USC. Courtney Martinez Connor became Head Coach starting with the 2018 campaign, Tim McCormack was named Head Coach beginning with the 2020 season, and Taryn VanThof was named Head Coach beginning with the 2023 season. Home games for the Arizona State Sun Devils are played at Sun Devil Soccer Stadium in Tempe, Arizona. During their inaugural season in 2018, the Sun Devils finished (6–12) overall, (1–9) in Pac-12 play, (1–6) at home, (5–5) on the road, and (0–1) in neutral site games. ASU completed the 2019 campaign (6–12) overall, (2–8) in Pac-12 play, (4–6) at home, (2–5) on the road, and (0–1) in neutral site contests. The Devils finished the shortened 2020 season (5–3) overall, (1–1) in Pac-12 play, (3–1) at home, and (2–2) on the road. Arizona State completed the 2021 campaign (10–6) overall, (5–4) in Pac-12 play, (6–2) at home, (3–3) on the road, and (1–1) in neutral site games. The Sun Devils finished the 2022 season (11–8) overall, (7–3) in Pac-12 play, (7–3) at home, and (4–5) on the road. ASU completed the 2023 campaign (6–13) overall, (3–7) in Pac-12 play, (3–3) at home, (1–9) on the road, and (2–1) in neutral site contests. The Devils finished the 2024 season (9–10) overall, (3–4) in Pac-12 play, (6–3) at home, (2–6) on the road, and (1–1) in neutral site contests. Arizona State completed the 2025 campaign (11-8) overall, (3-2) in Big 12 play, (7-2) at home, (4-3) on the road, and (0-3) in neutral site contests.

=== Softball ===
One of the nation's founding programs, the two-time NCAA national champion Sun Devils are in their 45th season on the diamond. ASU has recorded twenty-seven seasons of 30 or more wins and twelve with 40 or more, including an all-time high of 66 wins in 2008. The Sun Devils have appeared in 23 NCAA tournaments (33 postseason bids overall) and have made nine trips to the Women's College World Series. Prior to the existing NCAA format, ASU went to seven WCWS, claiming back-to-back national titles in 1972 and 1973. Arizona State's storied tradition of softball excellence continues to flourish under head coach Clint Myers, who has led the Sun Devils to two NCAA national championships. Myers joined Linda Vollstedt (women's golf – 7), Greg Kraft (women's track & field indoor – 2, women's track & field outdoor – 1, men's indoor track & field – 1), Bobby Winkles (baseball – 3) and Jim Brock (baseball – 2) as Sun Devil coaches with more than one NCAA title.

The Sun Devils capped off the 2008 season with their first WCWS NCAA national championship on June 3, 2008. Kaitlin Cochran hit a three-run home run, Katie Burkhart pitched a four-hitter and Arizona State routed Texas A&M 11–0 to win the title. Cochran slammed the first pitch from Megan Gibson over the left field fence in the fifth inning to give the sixth-seeded Sun Devils a 4–0 lead in the fifth inning. The margin ended up matching the second-most lopsided game in Women's College World Series history.

On June 7, 2011, the Sun Devils captured their second NCAA national championship by defeating the Florida Gators. ASU pitcher, Dallas Escobedo, became the first freshman pitcher to lead a team to the NCAA title since 1990.

=== Track and field ===
Entering his 19th season, Greg Kraft is the head coach of the Track and Field team. During his tenure the Sun Devils have won 4 NCAA Championships, 32 NCAA individual titles and produced 13 Olympians. As part of being in the Big 12 Conference, ASU competes with UCLA, UC Berkeley, University of Stanford, University of Colorado Boulder, University of Arizona, and other schools in the Big 12. Among the all-time Pac-12 records, three of the top ten times in the men's 4x400 relay are held by ASU (2004, 2004, 2005). The women hold three of the top ten spots in the 400m (1991, 2004, 2015). Sun Devil alumni include Olympian Dwight Phillips (Long Jump Gold Medal at 2004 Olympic games). ASU has a history producing top competitive athletes to compete in the Olympics even before 2004.

=== Golf ===
The Arizona State golf teams use Papago Golf Course as their home course. They play and practice, as of September 2019 at The Thunderbird Golf Complex, and the Phil and Amy Mickelson Player Development Practice Facility.

In 1960, 1962, 1969 and 1970, JoAnne Gunderson, Carol Sorenson, Jane Bastanchury and Cathy Gaughan, respectively, won the women's intercollegiate individual golf championship (an event conducted by the Division of Girls' and Women's Sports, which was succeeded by the existing NCAA women's golf championship). In 1975, the ASU women's golf team won the AIAW national championship. Monica Vaughn won the NCAA women's individual golf championship in 2017.

The women's golf team has won 8 national championships (1990, 1993, 1994, 1995, 1997, 1998, 2009, & 2017). There have been 10 women's individual champions in school history (1960 Joanne Gunderson-Carner, 1962 Carol Sorenson, 1969 Jane Bastanchury-Booth, 1970 Cathy Gaughan, 1985 Danielle Ammaccapane, 1994 Emilee Klein, 1995 Kristel Mourgue d'Algue, 1999 Grace Park, 2008 Azahara Munoz, & 2017 Monica Vaughn).

ASU women's golf has had 5 winners of the Honda Award (1994 Wendy Ward, 1995 Wendy Ward, 1998 Kellee Booth, 1999 Grace Park, & 2017 Monica Vaughn). Arizona State has had 5 coaches win the WGCA National Coach of the Year (1989 Linda Vollstedt, 1994 Linda Vollstedt, 1995 Linda Vollstedt -(Co-Winner), 2009 Melissa Luellen, & 2017 Missy Farr-Kaye). The Sun Devils have also claimed 5 winners of the Golfweek National Coach of the Year (1993 Linda Vollstedt, 1994 Linda Vollstedt, 1995 Linda Vollstedt, 1997 Linda Vollstedt, & 2017 Missy Farr-Kaye).

The men's golf team has won 21 conference championships:

- Border Conference (5): 1935, 1957–59, 1961
- Western Athletic Conference (3): 1969, 1971, 1978
- Pac-12 Conference (13): 1979, 1981, 1989–90, 1993, 1995–2000, 2008, 2024

They won NCAA regional championships in 1991 (co-champions), 1995, 1998 (co-champions), 1999, 2001, and 2009.

They won the NCAA Division I Championship in 1990 and 1996 while claiming six individual titles: Jim Carter (1983), Phil Mickelson (1989, 1990, 1992), Todd Demsey (1993), and Alejandro Cañizares (2003). The ASU women's golf program is the most successful is NCAA history with eight NCAA Division I national championships, most recently in 2017.

Golf alumni include Paul Casey, Bob Gilder, Matt Jones, Billy Mayfair, Phil Mickelson (6 time major champion), Mike Morley, Tom Purtzer, Jeff Quinney, Jon Rahm, Chez Reavie, Howard Twitty, JoAnne Carner, Heather Farr, Giulia Molinaro, Azahara Muñoz, Anna Nordqvist, Grace Park, Pearl Sinn and Wendy Ward.

Former students of Arizona State University top the all time money list for PGA tour career earnings. Phil Mickelson ($92.2M), Paul Casey ($32.2M), Pat Perez ($26.8M), Jon Rahm ($23.6M), Billy Mayfair ($20.3M), Chez Reavie ($16.7M), Matt Jones ($13.4M), Dan Forsman ($8.7M), Jim Carter ($4.8M), Tom Purtzer ($4.2M), Bob Gilder ($3.0M), Grayson Murray ($2.9M), Howard Twitty ($2.7M), John Adams ($2.0M), Morris Hatalsky ($1.7M) and Mike Morley ($526K) have collectively earned $255,706,471 from 89 wins.

=== Wrestling ===
The Sun Devil wrestling team have captured one NCAA team national championship (1988) beating out powerhouse Iowa for the title, followed by two years of national runners-up in 1989 and 1990, losing out to Oklahoma State both years. The Sun Devil wrestling team has produced 10 individual NCAA champions and over 100+ All-American wrestling honors in its history. Arizona State has won 24 Pac-12 Championships in program history.

Wrestling alumni include several Mixed Martial Arts stars, such as: Dan Severn (inductee to UFC Hall of Fame), Don Frye, Cain Velasquez (former UFC Heavyweight Champion), Ryan Bader, Aaron Simpson, Dan Henderson, John Moraga, Clifford Starks, C.B. Dollaway, and Bubba Jenkins (2011 157 lbs NCAA Champion). Other notable wrestlers include: Anthony Robles (2011 125 lbs NCAA Champion with one leg), Curley Culp (1967 NCAA Heavyweight Champion and member of Pro Football Hall of Fame), and Zahid Valencia (two-time NCAA Champion).

Eight Sun Devil wrestlers have participated at the Olympics, most recently in the 1996 Olympics in Atlanta. There have been two Olympic silver medalists from Arizona State; Zeke Jones and Townsend Saunders. Six Sun Devil wrestlers have participated in the World Championships of Wrestling since 1985 (on 16 occasions). Those wrestlers placed in the top 10 a total of ten times, including Zeke Jones, who was the 1991 World Champion at 52 kg or 114.6 pounds.

=== Ice hockey ===
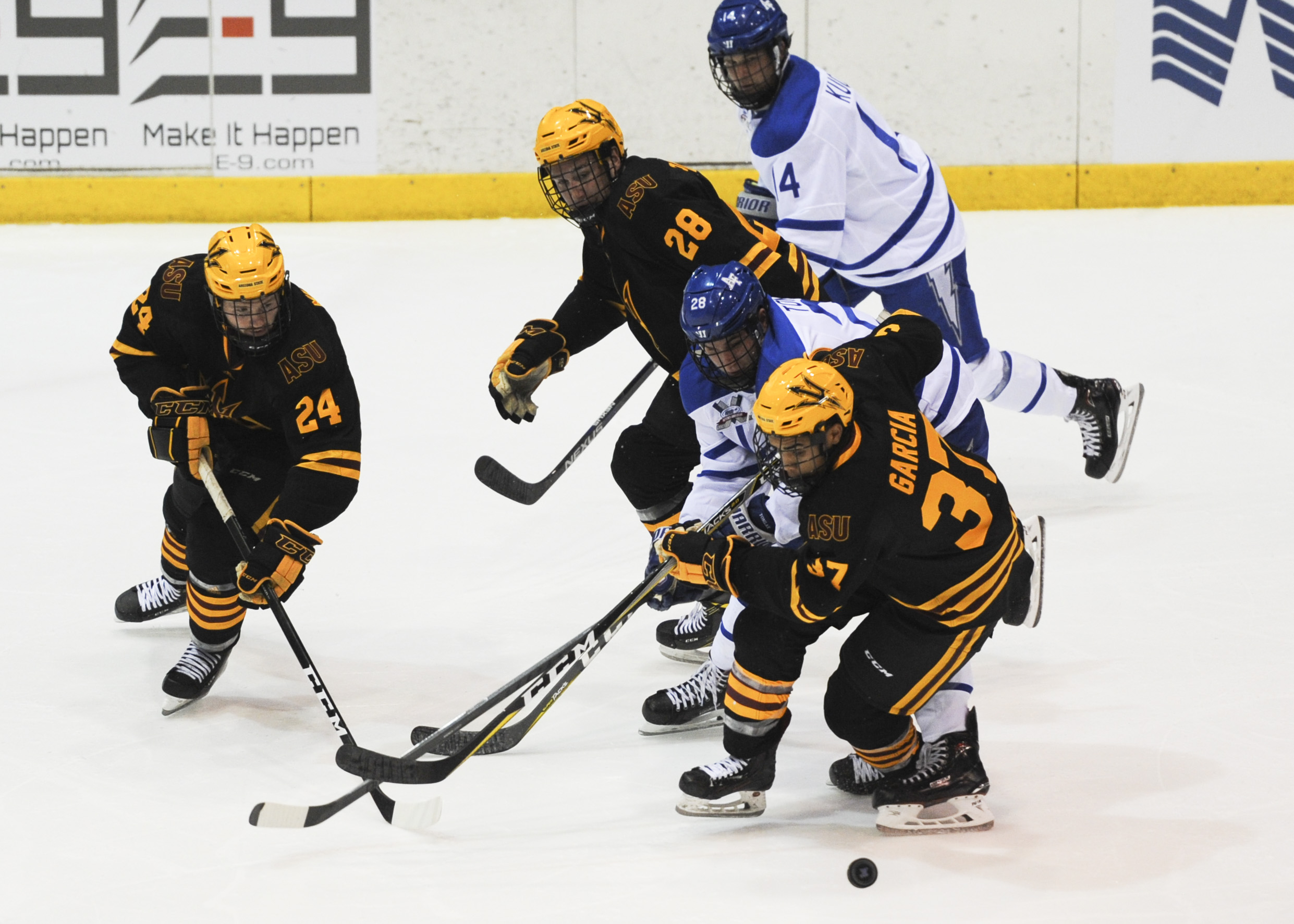
A men's ice hockey game between Arizona State and Air Force in 2017

The Sun Devil hockey team saw success in the early 2010s while a part of the American Collegiate Hockey Association. Beginning with the start of coach Greg Powers' tenure in 2010, the team appeared in five consecutive ACHA National Tournaments. In 2012–2013, Powers led ASU to a new program best record and first ever 30-plus win season with a record of 35–8–1, its first ever Final Four appearance, first ever national number-one ranking, and a landmark win over NCAA DI Penn State. During the 2013–2014 season, ASU won the ACHA DI National Championship, with Powers named ACHA DI National Coach of the Year. The Sun Devils were also named WCHL Conference Champions both for 2013–2014 and 2014–2015, and Powers was named WCHL Coach of the Year for 2013–2014. Powers was also named an ACHA Division I National Coach of the Year finalist in 2012–2013, and 2014–2015.

ASU announced plans to transition their ACHA men's hockey program to an NCAA varsity program on November 18, 2014. The Sun Devils continued play in the ACHA in 2014–15, played a hybrid schedule in 2015–16 with a mix of NCAA and ACHA competition, and played as a Division I independent in 2016–17 with plans to join a conference in 2017–18. The National Collegiate Hockey Conference, Western Collegiate Hockey Association, and Big Ten were all seen as potential landing spots for Arizona State. However, no conference move materialized until 2023, when ASU was announced as the newest NCHC member effective with the 2024–25 season.

== Non-varsity sports ==
=== Rugby ===
Founded in 1975, the Arizona State University men's rugby team has played college rugby in Division 1 of the Gold Coast Conference, which is part of American College Rugby, the USA Rugby-sanctioned governing body of Division I-AA, II and III college rugby since the summer of 2019. The Sun Devils formerly played in the Division 1-A PAC Rugby Conference, which is part of the College Rugby Association of America (also sanctioned by USA Rugby), in which their rivals included Pac-12 foes such as Arizona and UCLA. With 98 registered players, Arizona State was ranked as the largest college rugby program in the United States in 2009. Arizona State was led by head coach Gary Lane from 2001 until 2017, when he agreed to resign as part of disciplinary action taken by D-I Rugby (the College Rugby Association of America) in response to a violent on-field incident involving an ASU player. The team has since then been coached by Pieter Hugo. Arizona State was regularly ranked in the Top 25 in the country during its time as a Division I-A program. Arizona State's rugby sevens program has been successful in the Collegiate Rugby Championship, the highest profile college rugby tournament in the country, where they finished tenth in the 2010 tournament. Arizona State also participated in the 2013 USA Rugby Sevens Collegiate National Championships, where they went 5–1 and finished ninth.

== Championships ==
=== NCAA team championships ===
Arizona State has won 25 NCAA team national championships.

- Men (12)
  - Baseball (5): 1965, 1967, 1969, 1977, 1981
  - Golf (2): 1990, 1996
  - Gymnastics (1): 1986
  - Indoor Track & Field (1): 2008
  - Outdoor Track & Field (1): 1977
  - Swimming & diving (1): 2024
  - Wrestling (1): 1988
- Women (13)
  - Golf (8): 1990, 1993, 1994, 1995, 1997, 1998, 2009, 2017
  - Indoor Track and Field (2): 2007, 2008
  - Outdoor Track and Field (1): 2007
  - Softball (2): 2008, 2011
- see also:
  - Pac-12 Conference NCAA championships
  - List of NCAA schools with the most NCAA Division I championships
  - List of NCAA schools with the most Division I national championships

=== Other national team championships ===
Arizona State has 18 DGWS/AIAW team national championships.

- Women (18)
  - Badminton (7): 1971, 1975, 1976, 1978, 1979, 1980, 1981
  - Golf (1): 1975
  - Softball (2): 1972, 1973
  - Swimming (8): 1968, 1969, 1970, 1971, 1973, 1974, 1977, 1978

Below are 113 national team titles won by varsity and club sports teams at the highest collegiate levels in other non-NCAA competition:

- Men (33)
  - Archery (17): 1969, 1974, 1980, 1981, 1982, 1983, 1984, 1985, 1986, 1987, 1988, 1989, 1990, 1991, 1992, 1993, 1994
  - Badminton (13): 1978, 1980, 1983, 1984, 1985, 1986, 1987, 1988, 1989, 1990, 1991, 1992, 1993
  - Bowling (1): 1981
  - Karate (1): 1981
  - Paintball (1): 2005 (Div. AA)
- Women (45)
  - Archery (22): 1969, 1970, 1971, 1972, 1975, 1976, 1977, 1978, 1979, 1980, 1981, 1983, 1984, 1985, 1986, 1987, 1988, 1989, 1991, 1992, 1993, 1994
  - Badminton (10): 1984, 1985, 1986, 1987, 1988, 1989, 1990, 1991, 1992, 1993
  - Bowling (1): 1981
  - Racquetball (1): 2007
  - Rodeo (1): 1966
  - Tennis (USLTA) (3): 1971, 1972, 1974
  - Triathlon (7): 2016, 2017, 2018, 2019, 2021, 2022, 2023
- Mixed (35)
  - Archery (21): 1969, 1970, 1971, 1974, 1976, 1978, 1979, 1980, 1981, 1982, 1983, 1984, 1985, 1986, 1987, 1988, 1989, 1990, 1991, 1992, 1993, 1994
  - Badminton (10): 1984, 1985, 1986, 1987, 1988, 1989, 1990, 1991, 1992, 1993
  - Wakeboarding (3): 2013, 2014 (both College and Wake); 2014 (USA Wakeboard)
  - Waterskiing (1): 2001

== Rivalries ==
A strong academic and athletic rivalry exists between the University of Arizona and Arizona State University.

Arizona State University fields the more accomplished baseball team with five College World Series national championships (1965, 1967, 1969, 1977 and 1981) to the University of Arizona's four College World Series national championships (1976, 1980, 1986, and 2012). As of March 2026, the schools have met 501 times on the baseball diamond, dating back 119 years to the first contest in 1907. Arizona leads the all-time series 267–237–1 as of April 14th, 2026.

The annual football rivalry game between the two schools is known as "The Duel in the Desert." It is one of the most heated rivalries in college football. The University of Arizona has the all-time series lead with a record of 52–46–1 dating back to the time when ASU was the Tempe Normal Owls and Teacher's College Bulldogs. The school adopted the moniker, the Sun Devils, on November 20, 1946. The trophy awarded after each game, the Territorial Cup, is the nation's oldest rivalry trophy. It is held as of 2025 by the University of Arizona.

In 2009, State Farm introduced the sponsored "State Farm Territorial Cup" for the two schools. Arizona won the inaugural season of the series 10.5 points to 7.5.

The ASU wrestling team has been dominant over the UA Wildcats with a record of 28–8 all time. The University of Arizona no longer has a wrestling program.

== ASU athletic facilities ==
- Alberta B. Farrington Softball Stadium
- Desert Financial Arena
- John Spini Gymnastics Center
- Mona Plummer Aquatic Center
- Mullett Arena
- Papago Golf Course
- Phoenix Municipal Stadium
- Sun Angel Stadium, Joe Selleh Track
- Sun Devil Soccer Stadium
- Mountain America Stadium
- The Verde Dickey Dome
- Weatherup Center
- Whiteman Tennis Center
