= JJ Van Niel =

American volleyball player and coach

Current position
- Title: Head coach
- Team: Arizona State
- Conference: Big 12
- Record: 86–14 (.860)

Biographical details
- Born: April 7, 1975 (age 51); Rolling Hills, California, U.S.
- Education: University of Southern California

Coaching career (HC unless noted)
- 2011–2014: UC San Diego (assistant, men's)
- 2014: La Costa Canyon HS
- 2015–2016: Utah (assistant)
- 2017: Utah (associate HC)
- 2018–2022: USC (associate HC)
- 2023–present: Arizona State

Accomplishments and honors

Championships
- 2x Big 12 Champions (2024–2025)

Awards
- 2025 Big 12 Coach of the Year; 2024 AVCA Pacific Region Coach of the Year; 2024 Big 12 Coach of the Year; 2023 AVCA Pacific South Region Coach of the Year; 2023 Pac-12 Coach of the Year

Jamison Jvan "JJ" Van Niel (born April 7, 1975) is an American volleyball head coach. Since 2023, he has been the coach of the Arizona State women's volleyball team. Since taking over for the program, he has led the team to two straight Big 12 Conference titles in 2024 and 2025.

Prior to Arizona State, he served as the associate head coach at USC and was an assistant coach at Utah and the UC San Diego men's team.

== Personal life ==
Van Niel is a native of Rolling Hills, California. He attended University of Southern California and played on the men's ice hockey club team. He graduated in 1998. Prior to coaching volleyball, he spent 12 years in various financial roles in California.

== Coaching career ==
In a 2023 interview, Van Niel stated that during the time that he held his various roles in the financial industry, he played in a casual adult volleyball league, which opened the door to his coaching career. He recalled: "One of the nights I was supposed to play in an adult (volleyball) league (but) Coast had a tryout and I didn’t know that our game had been canceled,” Van Niel said. “So, I just randomly was like, ‘Do you guys ever need help?’ I still don't know why I asked." He was quickly named as the head coach of Coast Volleyball Club in San Diego despite having no prior coaching experience.

In addition to his collegiate coaching career, Van Niel has also spent time in various roles for the United States women's national volleyball team. In the 2016 Summer Olympics, he was the scouting coach for the team.

== Head coaching record ==
Record table
Season	Team	Overall	Conference	Standing	Postseason
Arizona State Sun Devils (Pac-12 Conference) (2023)
2023	Arizona State	28–7	14–6	T–3rd	NCAA Regional Semifinal
Arizona State Sun Devils (Big 12 Conference) (2024–present)
2024	Arizona State	30–3	17–1	1st	NCAA Second Round
2025	Arizona State	28–4	17–1	1st	NCAA Regional Semifinal
Arizona State:		86–14 (.860)	48–8 (.857)		
Total:		86–14 (.860)			
National champion Postseason invitational champion Conference regular season champion Conference regular season and conference tournament champion Division regular season champion Division regular season and conference tournament champion Conference tournament champion
