= Big Ten Conference =

American collegiate athletics conference

- Formerly: Intercollegiate Conference of Faculty Representatives (officially, 1896–1987); Western Conference (1896–1917); Big Nine (1899–1917, 1946–1950)
- Association: NCAA
- Founded: 1896; 130 years ago
- Commissioner: Tony Petitti (since 2023)
- Sports fielded: 28; men's: 14; women's: 14
- Division: Division I
- Subdivision: FBS
- No. of teams: 18
- Headquarters: Rosemont, Illinois, U.S.
- Region: Midwest; East North Central; West North Central; Northeast; Mid-Atlantic; West; Pacific
- Broadcasters: Fox/FS1/Big Ten Network; CBS; NBC/NBCSN
- Streaming partners: Fox One; Peacock; Paramount+
- Website: bigten.org

Locations

The Big Ten Conference (formerly the Western Conference and the Big Nine Conference, among others) is a collegiate athletic conference in the United States. Founded as the Intercollegiate Conference of Faculty Representatives in 1896, it predates the founding of its regulating organization, the NCAA; it is the oldest NCAA Division I conference. It is based in Rosemont, Illinois. For many decades the conference consisted of ten prominent universities, which accounts for its name. On August 2, 2024, the conference expanded to 18 member institutions and two affiliate institutions. The conference competes in the NCAA Division I and its football teams compete in the Football Bowl Subdivision (FBS), the highest level of NCAA competition in that sport.

Big Ten member institutions are major research universities with large financial endowments and strong academic reputations. A large student body is a hallmark of its universities, as 15 members enroll more than 30,000 students. They are all public universities except Northwestern University and the University of Southern California, both private universities. Collectively, Big Ten universities educate more than 520,000 total students and have 5.7 million living alumni. The members engage in $9.3 billion in funded research each year; 17 are members of the Association of American Universities (except Nebraska) and the Universities Research Association (except USC). All Big Ten universities are also members of the Big Ten Academic Alliance, formerly the Committee on Institutional Cooperation.

Although the Big Ten was primarily a Midwestern conference for nearly a century, the conference's geographic footprint has extended from the Mid-Atlantic to the Great Plains since 2014. In 2024, the conference gained a presence in the West Coast with the addition of four former Pac-12 Conference schools.

== Member universities ==
=== Full members ===
Institution	Location	Founded	Type	Enrollment (fall 2024)	Median earnings	Endowment (billions – FY24)	Nickname	Joined (Note: Represents the calendar year when fall sports competition begins.)	Colors
University of Illinois Urbana-Champaign	Champaign-Urbana, Illinois (Note: The overall university administration is in Urbana; the athletic administration is in Champaign.)	1867	Public	59,238	$79,628	$3.689 (system-wide)	Fighting Illini	1896	
Indiana University Bloomington	Bloomington, Indiana	1820	Public	48,424	$74,511	$3.821 (system-wide)	Hoosiers	1899 (Note: Athletic teams started competing in the conference effective with the 1900–01 school year.)	
University of Iowa	Iowa City, Iowa	1847	Public	30,779	$69,866	$3.502	Hawkeyes	1899	
University of Maryland, College Park	College Park, Maryland	1856	Public	41,725	$84,365	$2.291 (system-wide)	Terrapins	2014	
University of Michigan	Ann Arbor, Michigan	1817	Public	52,855	$96,159	$21.201	Wolverines	1896 1917 (Note: In April 1907, Michigan was voted out of the conference for refusing to adhere to league rules limiting football teams to no more than five games and players to three years of eligibility. Consequently, its athletic teams were independent from 1907–08 to 1916–17.)	
Michigan State University	East Lansing, Michigan	1855	Public	52,089	$74,093	$4.419	Spartans	1950 (Note: Non-football teams started competing in the conference effective with the 1950–51 school year, while football later joined in 1953–54.)	
University of Minnesota Twin Cities	Minneapolis-St. Paul, Minnesota (Note: The campus administration and most athletic facilities are in Minneapolis and have a mailing address in that city. The "St. Paul" portion of the campus is physically in the separate city of Falcon Heights, but both "St. Paul" and "Falcon Heights" are accepted as mailing addresses for that portion.)	1851	Public	56,666	$71,941	$5.935	Golden Gophers	1896	
University of Nebraska–Lincoln	Lincoln, Nebraska	1869	Public	24,393	$62,769	$2.527 (system-wide)	Cornhuskers	2011	
Northwestern University	Evanston, Illinois	1851	Nonsectarian (Note: Northwestern was initially affiliated with the Methodist Episcopal Church (MEC), but committed itself to a nonsectarian admissions policy from its founding.)	23,856	$109,275	$14.210	Wildcats	1896	
Ohio State University	Columbus, Ohio	1870	Public	61,443	$70,682	$7.932	Buckeyes	1912	
University of Oregon	Eugene, Oregon	1876	Public	24,404	$62,174	$1.651	Ducks	2024	
Pennsylvania State University	University Park, Pennsylvania (Note: "University Park" is the mailing address for the entire Penn State campus, which spreads across three communities—State College, which houses the university administration and most undergraduate operations; College Township, home to most athletic facilities; and Ferguson Township, location of most agricultural operations.)	1855	Public	50,737	$76,659	$4.769	Nittany Lions	1990 (Note: Most sports teams started competing in the conference in the 1991–92 school year; football started Big Ten play in 1993–94.)	
Purdue University	West Lafayette, Indiana	1869	Public	58,658	$81,751	$4.106 (system-wide)	Boilermakers	1896	
Rutgers University	New Brunswick-Piscataway, New Jersey (Note: The university administration and its historic core campus are in New Brunswick. The athletic department headquarters and virtually all athletic facilities are in Piscataway. Small parts of its sub-campuses are in other adjacent communities.)	1766	Public	52,269	$77,933	$2.180 (system-wide)	Scarlet Knights	2014	
University of California, Los Angeles	Los Angeles, California (Westwood)	1919	Public	47,335	$77,677	$4.299	Bruins	2024	
University of Southern California	Los Angeles, California (University Park)	1880	Nonsectarian (Note: USC is historically affiliated with the Methodist Church until 1952.)	46,566	$95,739	$8.744	Trojans	2024	
University of Washington	Seattle, Washington	1861	Public	56,997	$82,515	$5.457	Huskies	2024	
University of Wisconsin-Madison	Madison, Wisconsin	1848	Public	51,044	$78,974	$4.305	Badgers	1896	

=== Membership map ===
Big Ten Conference
Location of Big Ten members
1 Rutgers
2 Maryland
3 Penn State
4 Ohio State
5 Michigan
6 Michigan State
7 Indiana
8 Purdue
9 Illinois
10 Northwestern
11 Wisconsin
12 Iowa
13 Minnesota
14 Nebraska
15 USC
16 UCLA
17 Oregon
18 Washington
19 Johns Hopkins
20 Notre Dame

=== Affiliate members ===
Overview of affiliate members of the Big Ten Conference
Institution	Location	Founded	Type	Enrollment (fall 2023)	Nickname	Joined (Note: Represents the calendar year when fall sports competition begins.)	Colors	Big Ten sport(s)	Primary conference
Johns Hopkins University	Baltimore, Maryland	1876	Nonsectarian (Note: Also a not-for-profit institution.)	30,362	Blue Jays	2014		Men's lacrosse	Centennial (Note: Currently an NCAA Division III athletic conference.)
Johns Hopkins University	Baltimore, Maryland	1876	Nonsectarian	30,362	Blue Jays	2016		Women's lacrosse	Centennial
University of Notre Dame	Notre Dame, Indiana	1842	Catholic (CSC)	13,174	Fighting Irish	2017		Men's ice hockey	ACC

=== Former member ===
The University of Chicago is the only full member to have permanently left the Big Ten Conference. (Note: Lake Forest College attended the original 1895 meeting that led to the formation of the conference, but never participated in athletics or any other activities.)

Overview of former member of the Big Ten Conference
Institution	Location	Founded	Type	Enrollment (fall 2023)	Nickname	Joined (Note: Represents the calendar year when fall sports competition begins.)	Left (Note: Represents the calendar year when spring sports competition ends.)	Colors	Current conference
University of Chicago	Chicago, Illinois	1890	Nonsectarian (Note: Also a not-for-profit institution.)	18,339	Maroons	1896	1946 (Note: The University of Chicago was a co-founder of the conference. The school dropped football after the 1939 fall season (1939–40 school year), but remained a member in other sports until the end of the 1945–46 academic year.)		UAA (Note: Currently an NCAA Division III athletic conference.)

=== Membership timeline ===
Full members Full members (non-football) Sport affiliate Other conference Other conference

== History ==
=== 1890s: The conference's founding ===
On January 11, 1895, Purdue University president James Henry Smart invited the presidents of the University of Chicago, University of Illinois, Lake Forest College, University of Minnesota, Northwestern University, and University of Wisconsin to a meeting in Chicago, to create policies aimed at regulating intercollegiate athletics. The eligibility of student-athletes was one of the main topics of discussion, with it being decided that student-athletes must be full-time students in good standing. The conference was officially founded at a second meeting on February 8, 1896. Lake Forest was not at the 1896 meeting and was replaced by the University of Michigan. Henceforth the seven attendees of this second meeting would be the founding members of the organization more commonly known as the Western Conference.

The conference is one of the nation's oldest, predating the founding of the NCAA by a decade and was one of the first collegiate conferences to sponsor men's basketball. The first reference to the conference as the Big Nine was in 1899 following the admission of Iowa and Indiana.

=== 1900s: Becoming the Big Ten ===
Nebraska first petitioned to join the league in 1900 and again in 1911, but was turned away both times. Notre Dame applied twice as well, first at the conference's founding and again in 1908, but like Nebraska was rejected both times. In 1905, the conference was officially incorporated as the Intercollegiate Conference of Faculty Representatives.

In 1906, Michigan president James Burrill Angell called for a series of conference meetings to further regulate football, leading to new rules such as limiting football teams to no more than five games and players to three years of eligibility. One of the new rules would require the football coach to be a full-time employee of the university, leading to Michigan's football head coach, Fielding Yost, to oppose the changes. Ultimately Yost won out and convinced Michigan's board to support him over Angell and against the conference. In April 1907, Michigan was voted out of the conference for refusing to adhere to the new league rules. Ohio State joined in 1912, and as a result could no longer play Michigan until the school rejoined the conference after a nine-year absence. The first known references to the conference as the Big Ten were then made in December 1916 as a result.

In 1926, Notre Dame was again rejected for admittance to the conference.

=== 1940s: Chicago leaves and Michigan State joins ===
The conference was again known as the Big Nine after the University of Chicago decided to de-emphasize varsity athletics just after World War II. In 1939, UChicago President Robert Maynard Hutchins made the decision to abolish the football program, based on his negative views of big-time college football's excesses and associated problems of the time. Chicago completely withdrew from the conference in 1946 after struggling to obtain victories in many conference matchups.

Several schools sought to replace Chicago and obtained support from current members: Michigan State with support from Minnesota, Nebraska with support from Iowa, and Pittsburgh with support from Ohio State. Ultimately, on December 12, 1948, it was announced that the conference had voted 9–0 to approve Michigan State's joining the conference, which would again be known as the Big Ten. The school's non-football sports commenced conference play in 1950, with football joining three years later. The Big Ten's membership would remain unchanged for the next 40 years. The conference's official name throughout this period remained the Intercollegiate Conference of Faculty Representatives. It did not formally adopt the name Big Ten until 1987, when it was incorporated as a not-for-profit corporation.

=== 1990s: Penn State joins, Notre Dame declines ===
Big Ten logo (1990–2011). To reflect the addition of the 11th school, Penn State, the number 11 was placed in the negative space of the "Big Ten" lettering.

In 1990, the Big Ten universities voted to expand the conference to 11 teams and extended an invitation to Atlantic 10 Conference member and football independent Pennsylvania State University, which accepted. When Penn State joined in 1990, it was decided the conference would continue to be called the Big Ten, but its logo was modified to reflect the change; the number 11 was disguised in the negative space of the traditionally blue "Big Ten" lettering.

Missouri showed interest in Big Ten membership after Penn State joined. Around 1993, the league explored adding Kansas, Missouri and Rutgers or other potential schools, to create a 14-team league with two football divisions. These talks died when the Big Eight Conference merged with former Southwest Conference members to create the Big 12.

Following the addition of Penn State, efforts were made to encourage Notre Dame, at that time the last remaining non-service academy independent, to join the league. In 1999, Notre Dame, then a member of the Big East Conference and football independent, and the Big Ten entered into private negotiations concerning a possible membership that would include Notre Dame. Although Notre Dame's faculty senate endorsed the idea, the school's board of trustees decided against joining the conference. Notre Dame subsequently joined the Atlantic Coast Conference in all sports except football (and hockey), in which Notre Dame maintains its independent status as long as it plays at least five games per season against ACC opponents. This was believed to be the major stumbling block to Notre Dame joining the Big Ten, as Notre Dame wanted to retain its independent home game broadcasting contract with NBC Sports, while the Big Ten insisted upon a full membership with no special exemptions.

=== 2010s: From 11 to 14 ===
==== Nebraska joins ====
In December 2009, Big Ten Conference commissioner Jim Delany announced that the league was looking to expand in what would later be part of a nationwide trend as part of the 2010–2014 NCAA conference realignment. On June 11, 2010, the University of Nebraska applied for membership in the Big Ten and was unanimously approved as the conference's 12th school, which became effective July 1, 2011. The conference retained the name "Big Ten". This briefly led to the interesting and ironic result of the Big Ten consisting of twelve teams, and the Big 12 consisting of ten teams (with fellow former Big 12 member Colorado's move to the Pac-12 Conference). As part of the agreement to join the Big Ten, Nebraska would not receive a full share of the media revenue for the first six years of its membership, until fall 2017.

==== Legends and Leaders divisions ====
Big Ten (2011–2013): Legends Division, Leaders Division

On September 1, 2010, Delany revealed the conference's football divisional split, but noted that the division names would be announced later. Those division names, as well as the conference's new logo, were made public on December 13, 2010. For its new logo, the conference replaced the "hidden 11" logo with one that uses the "B1G" character combination in its branding. Delany did not comment on the logo that day, but it was immediately evident that the new logo would "allow fans to see 'BIG' and '10' in a single word."

For the new football division names, the Big Ten was unable to use geographic names, because they had rejected a geographic arrangement. Delany announced that the new divisions would be known as the "Legends Division" and "Leaders Division". In the Legends division were Iowa, Michigan, Michigan State, Minnesota, Nebraska and Northwestern. The Leaders division was composed of Illinois, Indiana, Ohio State, Penn State, Purdue and Wisconsin. Conference officials stated they had focused on creating competitive fairness rather than splitting by geographical location. However, the new "Legends" and "Leaders" divisions were not met with enthusiasm. Some traditional rivals, including Ohio State and Michigan, were placed in separate divisions.

For the football season, each team played the others in its division, one "cross-over" rivalry game, and two rotating cross-divisional games. At the end of the regular season the two division winners met in a new Big Ten Football Championship Game. The Legends and Leaders divisional alignment was in effect for the 2011, 2012 and 2013 football seasons.

==== Maryland and Rutgers join ====
On November 19, 2012, the University of Maryland's Board of Regents voted to withdraw from the ACC and join the Big Ten as its 13th member effective on July 1, 2014. The Big Ten's Council of Presidents approved the move later that day. One day later, Rutgers University of the Big East also accepted an offer for membership from the Big Ten as its 14th member school. Like Nebraska, both schools would not receive full shares of the media revenue until six years after they joined. However, both schools took loans from the conference, thus pushing back the date they would receive full shares.

==== West and East divisions ====
Big Ten (2013–2024): West Division, East Division

On April 28, 2013, the Big Ten presidents and chancellors unanimously approved a football divisional realignment that went into effect when Maryland and Rutgers joined in 2014. Under the new plan, the Legends and Leaders divisions were replaced with geographic divisions. The West Division included Illinois, Iowa, Minnesota, Nebraska, Northwestern, Purdue and Wisconsin (of which all but Purdue are in the Central Time Zone), while the East Division included Indiana, Maryland, Michigan, Michigan State, Ohio State, Penn State and Rutgers (all of which are in the Eastern Time Zone). The final issue in determining the new divisions was which of the two Indiana schools would be sent to the West; Purdue was chosen because its West Lafayette campus is geographically west of Indiana's home city of Bloomington. The divisional alignment permanently protected the cross-divisional football rivalry Indiana–Purdue. As before, the two division winners played each other in the Big Ten Football Championship Game. The West and East divisional alignment was in effect for ten football seasons, from 2014 through 2023.

==== Affiliate members join ====
On June 3, 2013, the Big Ten announced the sponsorship of men's and women's lacrosse. For any conference to qualify for an automatic bid to the NCAA tournament, at least six member schools must play the sport. In women's lacrosse, the addition of Maryland and Rutgers to the Big Ten brought the conference up to the requisite six participants, joining programs at Michigan, Northwestern, Ohio State and Penn State. In men's lacrosse, Ohio State and Penn State were the only existing participants. Coincident with the addition of Maryland and Rutgers, Michigan agreed to upgrade its successful club team to varsity status, giving the Big Ten five sponsoring schools, one short of the minimum six for an automatic bid. Johns Hopkins University opted to join the conference as its first affiliate member beginning in 2014. Johns Hopkins had been independent in men's lacrosse for 130 years, claiming 44 national championships. As long-time independents joined conferences (for example, Syracuse joining the Atlantic Coast Conference), other schools competing as independents in some cases concluded that the inability to earn an automatic bid to the NCAA tournament was becoming a more serious competitive disadvantage in scheduling and recruiting.

On March 23, 2016, the Big Ten Conference and Notre Dame announced the Fighting Irish would become a men's ice hockey affiliate beginning with the 2017–18 season. Notre Dame had been a member of Hockey East, and the move would save travel time and renew rivalries with former CCHA and WCHA members.

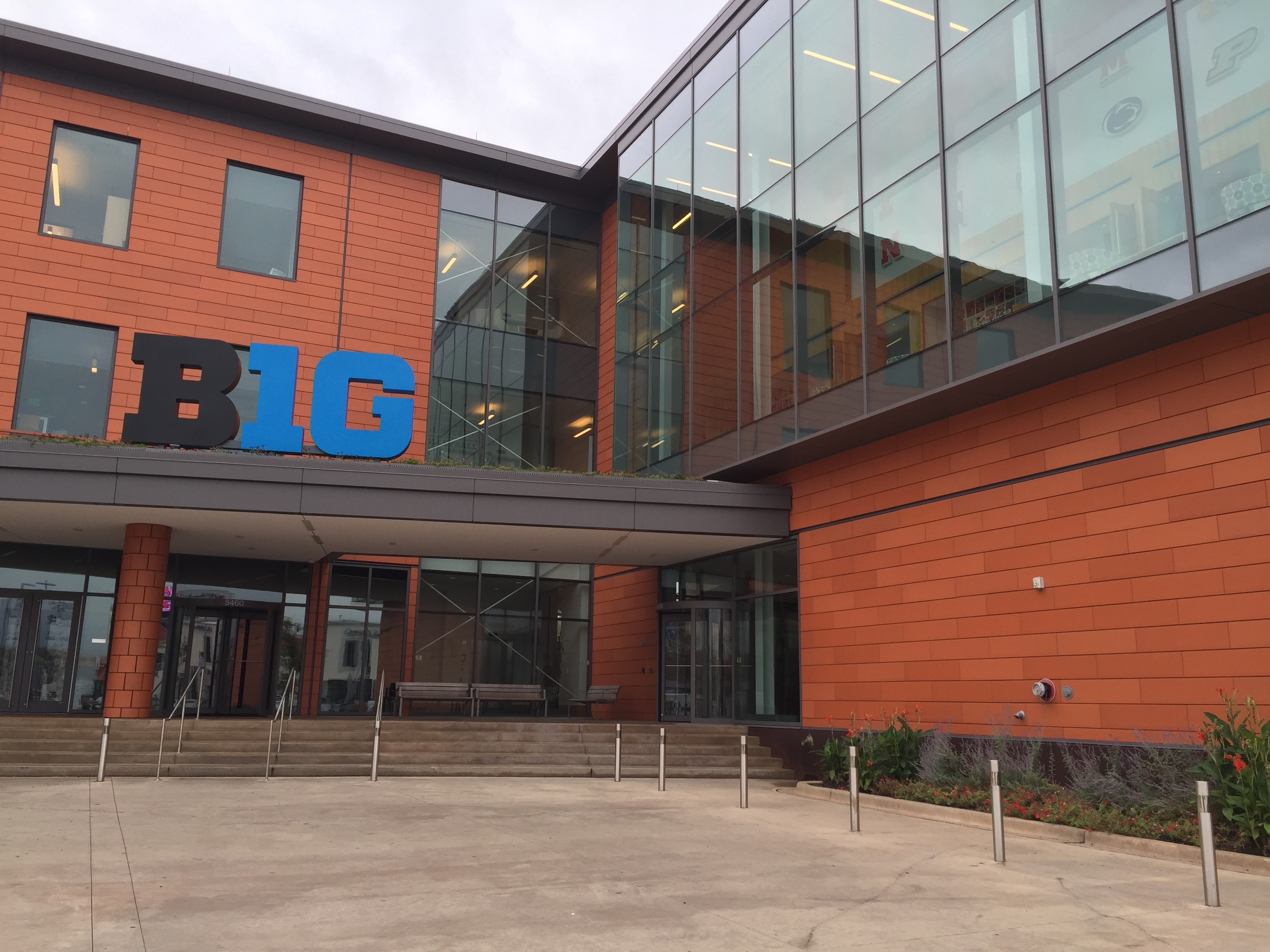
The conference's headquarters in Rosemont, Illinois

In 2013, the conference moved its headquarters from its location in Park Ridge, Illinois to neighboring Rosemont. The office building is situated within Rosemont's Parkway Bank Park Entertainment District (then named MB Financial Park Entertainment District), alongside Interstate 294.

=== 2020s: Pacific expansion ===
On June 30, 2022, UCLA and USC announced that they would be joining the Big Ten Conference effective August 2, 2024, enabling both schools to remain in the Pac-12 Conference for the duration of the Pac-12's existing media rights agreements. Unlike the prior expansion with Nebraska, Rutgers, and Maryland, USC and UCLA would join with a full share of the media revenue from the start of their Big Ten tenure.

In August 2022, the conference reached new media rights deals with CBS, Fox, and NBC totaled at an estimated $7 billion.

On August 4, 2023, Oregon and Washington announced that they would join the Big Ten Conference alongside UCLA and USC. Unlike UCLA and USC, the two schools would receive a reduced media revenue share of $30 million each, with the share increasing by $1 million for each school each year, through the 2029–30 season. Rather than reducing the other conference members' revenue shares, Fox would contribute the necessary money. The schools will receive a full share with the next media deal.

==== Football: the return of no divisions ====
Big Ten (2024–present)

In June 2023 – after UCLA and USC were confirmed as incoming members but before Oregon and Washington were added – the conference announced that starting in 2024, the East and West divisions for football would be eliminated. Each team would play nine conference games and three non-conference games, as before. Within a four-year period, each team would play at least two games against every other team – one at home and one away. This plan called for 11 protected matchups to take place every year; these included Michigan–Ohio State and ten other regional rivalries. At the end of each season, the top two teams in the conference standings would oppose each other in the Big Ten Football Championship Game.

The addition of Oregon and Washington added one more protected matchup to this count, bringing the total to 12 protected matchups: Illinois–Northwestern, Illinois–Purdue, Indiana–Purdue, Iowa–Minnesota, Iowa–Nebraska, Iowa–Wisconsin, Maryland–Rutgers, Michigan–Michigan State, Michigan–Ohio State, Minnesota–Wisconsin, Oregon–Washington and UCLA–USC, leaving Penn State as the lone school with no protected matchups. The schedule was also updated so that teams will play every other conference opponent at least twice – once home and once away – and will play rotating opponents no more than three times in a five-year period.

== Academics ==
All current members of the Big Ten are doctorate-granting universities.

Former conference commissioner Jim Delany said in 2010 that membership in the Association of American Universities is "an important part of who we are." All current members of the Big Ten, other than the University of Nebraska–Lincoln, are members of the AAU. Nebraska was a member of the AAU when it was admitted to the Big Ten, but lost this status shortly afterwards.

The following table shows National University rank by U.S. News & World Report as of 2027.

Also indicated is membership in the Association of American Universities.

Academics at members of the Big Ten Conference
Institution	National university rank	AAU member
Northwestern University	9	Yes
University of California, Los Angeles	20	Yes
University of Michigan	25	Yes
University of Southern California	27	Yes
University of Illinois Urbana-Champaign	34	Yes
University of Wisconsin–Madison	34	Yes
Ohio State University	44	Yes
Rutgers University	44	Yes
University of Maryland, College Park	49	Yes
University of Washington	49	Yes
Purdue University	55	Yes
Pennsylvania State University	55	Yes
University of Minnesota	59	Yes
Michigan State University	69	Yes
Indiana University Bloomington	73	Yes
University of Iowa	100	Yes
University of Oregon	116	Yes
University of Nebraska–Lincoln	169	No

=== Student profile and outcomes ===
Undergraduate campus diversity (Fall 2024)
Campus	Asian	Black	Hispanic	International	Two or more races	Unknown	White	Low-income
Illinois	23%	5%	14%	14%	4%	2%	38%	25%
Indiana	11%	4%	9%	5%	6%	1%	65%	18%
Iowa	4%	3%	9%	1%	4%	4%	74%	20%
Maryland	24%	13%	11%	3%	5%	5%	39%	21%
Michigan	18%	5%	12%	8%	6%	4%	47%	20%
Michigan State	8%	7%	7%	5%	4%	2%	67%	22%
Minnesota	13%	10%	7%	6%	5%	2%	57%	26%
Nebraska	4%	3%	10%	3%	4%	1%	76%	25%
Northwestern	21%	8%	16%	12%	8%	4%	31%	20%
Ohio State	11%	8%	6%	8%	5%	3%	60%	22%
Oregon	7%	3%	17%	1%	10%	1%	61%	23%
Penn State	8%	5%	9%	9%	4%	2%	63%	15%
Purdue	15%	3%	8%	10%	5%	6%	54%	15%
Rutgers	34%	7%	16%	7%	4%	2%	30%	30%
UCLA	30%	3%	24%	8%	8%	3%	24%	30%
USC	23%	7%	20%	13%	6%	4%	26%	25%
Washington	27%	4%	10%	12%	8%	4%	33%	21%
Wisconsin	11%	2%	9%	10%	5%	4%	59%	18%

Undergraduate student success outcomes (Fall 2024)
Campus	Retention rate (Note: The percentage of full-time students who return to this college after completing their first year.)	Graduation rate (Note: The percentage of students who graduate within 8 years of starting at this college.)	Net price (Note: The average yearly cost to attend this college for students from a family income of $0K to $30K, minus any grants and scholarships the student receives. For public colleges, this is the cost for in-state students.)	Federal loan rate (Note: The percentage of undergraduate students who borrowed federal loans to help pay for college.)	Median debt (Note: The median federal loan debt of graduates of this college. This includes only federal loans taken out at this college, and excludes private student loans, Parent PLUS loans, and federal loans taken out at other colleges.)	Median earnings (Note: The median yearly incomes of former students who received federal aid 4 years after graduating from the college.)
Illinois	95%	86%	$871	27%	$17,750	$79,628
Indiana	91%	81%	$6,683	28%	$19,000	$74,511
Iowa	90%	73%	$15,353	42%	$21,262	$69,866
Maryland	96%	86%	$1,141	22%	$16,000	$84,365
Michigan	98%	94%	$3,155	24%	$18,515	$96,159
Michigan State	91%	82%	$11,741	36%	$20,000	$74,093
Minnesota	91%	83%	$5,885	37%	$19,350	$71,941
Nebraska	85%	67%	$11,449	33%	$19,500	$62,769
Northwestern	98%	97%	$1,427	18%	$17,017	$109,275
Ohio State	94%	83%	$6,061	29%	$19,500	$70,682
Oregon	86%	74%	$15,917	30%	$18,897	$62,174
Penn State	92%	86%	$22,193	41%	$24,500	$76,659
Purdue	92%	79%	$6,147	23%	$18,750	$81,751
Rutgers	93%	85%	$15,090	37%	$18,974	$77,933
UCLA	97%	94%	$7,755	19%	$13,750	$77,677
USC	96%	93%	$17,171	23%	$17,000	$95,739
Washington	95%	85%	$7,610	19%	$14,008	$82,515
Wisconsin	95%	90%	$3,424	21%	$18,375	$78,974

== Commissioners ==
The office of the commissioner of athletics was created in 1922 "to study athletic problems of the various member universities and assist in enforcing the eligibility rules which govern Big Ten athletics."

Commissioners of the Big Ten Conference
Name	Years	Notes
John L. Griffith	1922–1944	Died in office
Kenneth L. "Tug" Wilson	1945–1961	Retired
William R. Reed	1961–1971	Died in office
Wayne Duke	1971–1989	Retired
Jim Delany	1989–2020	Retired
Kevin Warren	2020–2023	Resigned to become president of the Chicago Bears
Tony Petitti	2023–present	

All Big Ten members are members of the Big Ten Academic Alliance, formerly known as the Committee on Institutional Cooperation. The University of Chicago, a former Big Ten Conference member, was a member of the CIC from 1958 to June 29, 2016.

== Financials ==
=== Conference distributions ===
The following table shows Big Ten Conference distributions during the fiscal year beginning July 1, 2024, and ending June 30, 2025, as reported by ProPublica using Schedule A of the Big Ten Conference tax filing submitted on April 30, 2026.

Institution	2024–25 Distribution
Ohio State	$91,552,082
Penn State	$88,921,162
Indiana	$81,009,897
Nebraska	$79,876,965
Michigan	$79,426,201
Minnesota	$79,199,226
Illinois	$79,100,242
Iowa	$79,071,495
Rutgers	$78,490,746
USC	$78,057,558
Michigan State	$77,866,363
Wisconsin	$77,779,047
Purdue	$77,732,782
Northwestern	$77,510,197
Maryland	$76,028,091
UCLA	$76,011,658
Oregon	$48,416,125
Washington	$46,708,168
Average for 16 Full Share Members Average for 2 Partial Share Members	$79,852,107 $47,562,147

=== CNBC list of the most valuable Big Ten schools ===
Rankings as of December 19, 2025 (2024–25 academic year)

Big Ten	NCAA	School	Valuation	Value Change	Revenue	Revenue Change
1	2	Ohio State Buckeyes	$1.35 billion	▲2%	$255 million	▼9%
2	5	Michigan Wolverines	$1.16 billion	▲9%	$239 million	▲4%
3	8	USC Trojans	$1.10 billion	▲19%	$242 million	▲14%
4	10	Nebraska Cornhuskers	$1.06 billion	▲12%	$221 million	▲8%
5	11	Penn State Nittany Lions	$1.06 billion	▲15%	$220 million	▲9%
6	16	Oregon Ducks	$880 million	▲13%	$169 million	▲12%
7	17	Wisconsin Badgers	$875 million	▲4%	$191 million	▼4%
8	19	Iowa Hawkeyes	$835 million	▲12%	$173 million	▲4%
9	20	Illinois Fighting Illini	$815 million	▲23%	$174 million	▲18%
10	25	Washington Huskies	$795 million	▲21%	$191 million	▲26%
11	26	Michigan State Spartans	$780 million	▲5%	$164 million	▼4%
12	27	Indiana Hoosiers	$775 million	▲19%	$174 million	▲20%
13	32	Minnesota Golden Gophers	$695 million	▲9%	$151 million	▲1%
14	34	Purdue Boilermakers	$670 million	▲18%	$135 million	▲9%
15	44	Northwestern Wildcats	$580 million	▲19%	$124 million	▲5%
16	52	UCLA Bruins	$539 million	▲14%	$119 million	▲13%
17	53	Maryland Terrapins	$534 million	▲12%	$128 million	▲6%
18	56	Rutgers Scarlet Knights	$506 million	▲21%	$137 million	▲10%

=== Athletic department revenue by school ===
Total revenue includes ticket sales, contributions and donations, rights and licensing, student fees, school funds and all other sources including TV income, camp income, concessions, and novelties.

Total expenses includes coach and staff salaries, scholarships, buildings and grounds, maintenance, utilities and rental fees, recruiting, team travel, equipment and uniforms, conference dues, and insurance.

The following table shows institutional reporting to the United States Department of Education as shown on the DOE Equity in Athletics website for the 2024–25 academic year.

Institution	2024–25 Grand Total Revenues	2024–25 Grand Total Expenses	2024–25 Total Expenses on Football	2024–25 Total Expenses on Men's Basketball	2024–25 Total Expenses on Women's Basketball	2024–25 Total Expenses on All Other Sports	2024–25 Total Expenses Not Allocated by Sport
Ohio State	$295,265,883	$295,265,883	$92,359,309	$13,158,683	$7,163,564	$64,016,431	$117,181,173
Michigan	$236,376,759	$222,088,909	$61,663,186	$14,358,515	$5,858,899	$58,345,456	$81,862,853
USC	$234,029,848	$234,029,848	$74,014,972	$13,074,782	$9,610,324	$43,292,504	$94,037,266
Penn State	$254,397,122	$231,709,762	$77,386,097	$14,434,548	$5,101,960	$50,011,954	$84,775,203
Nebraska	$205,807,522	$198,462,402	$70,574,668	$13,196,203	$6,092,105	$43,040,656	$65,558,770
Wisconsin	$190,503,289	$180,525,755	$40,903,448	$12,464,124	$5,120,630	$46,174,024	$75,863,529
Indiana	$182,095,778	$159,331,697	$50,207,544	$31,818,423	$9,293,179	$34,812,417	$33,200,134
Iowa	$179,990,052	$150,892,055	$50,894,414	$13,292,250	$8,482,645	$35,903,798	$42,318,948
Washington	$178,415,083	$174,834,634	$68,921,774	$11,725,277	$7,531,528	$47,711,186	$38,944,869
Illinois	$174,612,181	$174,612,181	$48,001,399	$20,565,967	$7,258,435	$31,877,508	$66,908,872
UCLA	$173,429,394	$173,429,394	$55,205,071	$17,799,741	$9,690,479	$43,485,928	$47,248,175
Rutgers	$171,679,918	$171,679,918	$75,922,954	$16,076,899	$7,528,347	$43,179,405	$28,972,313
Oregon	$167,129,024	$164,742,082	$60,847,472	$14,072,866	$6,718,334	$30,960,949	$52,142,461
Michigan State	$160,697,176	$160,697,176	$48,227,813	$20,566,735	$7,247,013	$39,523,115	$45,132,500
Minnesota	$156,773,938	$146,804,169	$45,452,693	$15,623,863	$6,587,319	$39,928,528	$39,211,766
Purdue	$150,536,320	$135,140,397	$37,193,229	$14,040,438	$4,911,279	$25,875,918	$53,119,533
Northwestern	$131,779,238	$131,779,238	$37,901,761	$14,728,871	$5,852,067	$34,082,494	$39,214,045
Maryland	$128,662,116	$128,662,116	$35,502,618	$12,972,857	$8,236,450	$29,239,865	$42,710,326

== Key personnel ==
Senior personnel of Big Ten Conference athletic programs
School	Athletic director	Football coach	Men's basketball coach	Women's basketball coach	Baseball coach	Softball coach	Volleyball coach
Illinois	Josh Whitman	Bret Bielema	Brad Underwood	Shauna Green	Dan Hartleb	Jenna Hall	Chris Tamas
Indiana	Scott Dolson	Curt Cignetti	Darian DeVries	Teri Moren	Jeff Mercer	Shonda Stanton	Steve Aird
Iowa	Beth Goetz	Kirk Ferentz	Ben McCollum	Jan Jensen	Rick Heller	Renee Luers-Gillispie	Jim Barnes
Maryland	James E. Smith	Aazaar Abdul-Rahim (interim)	Buzz Williams	Brenda Frese	Matt Swope	Lauren Karn	Adam Hughes
Michigan	Warde Manuel	Kyle Whittingham	Mike Boynton	Kim Barnes Arico	Tracy Smith	Bonnie Tholl	Erin Virtue
Michigan State	Dan Bartholomae	Pat Fitzgerald	Tom Izzo	Robyn Fralick	Jake Boss	Sharonda McDonald-Kelley	Kristen Kelsay
Minnesota	Mark Coyle	P.J. Fleck	Niko Medved	Dawn Plitzuweit	Ty McDevitt	Gretta Melsted	Keegan Cook
Nebraska	Troy Dannen	Matt Rhule	Fred Hoiberg	Amy Williams	Will Bolt	Rhonda Revelle	Dani Busboom Kelly
Northwestern	Mark Jackson	David Braun	Chris Collins	Carla Berube	Ben Greenspan	Kate Drohan	Tim Nollan
Ohio State	Ross Bjork	Ryan Day	Jake Diebler	Kevin McGuff	Justin Haire	Kirin Kumar	Vacant
Oregon	Rob Mullens	Dan Lanning	Tony Stubblefield (interim)	Kelly Graves	Mark Wasikowski	Melyssa Lombardi	Trent Kersten
Penn State	Pat Kraft	Matt Campbell	Mike Rhoades	Tanisha Wright	Mike Gambino	Clarisa Crowell	Katie Schumacher-Cawley
Purdue	Mike Bobinski	Barry Odom	Matt Painter	Katie Gearlds	Greg Goff	Magali Frezzotti	Dave Shondell
Rutgers	Keli Zinn	Greg Schiano	Steve Pikiell	Gary Redus II	Steve Owens	Kristen Butler	Caitlin Schweihofer
UCLA	Tim Harris (interim)	Bob Chesney	Mick Cronin	Cori Close	John Savage	Kelly Inouye-Perez	Matt Werle
USC	Jennifer Cohen	Lincoln Riley	Eric Musselman	Lindsay Gottlieb	Andy Stankiewicz	No Team	Brad Keller
Washington	Patrick Chun	Jedd Fisch	Danny Sprinkle	Tina Langley	Eddie Smith	Heather Tarr	Leslie Gabriel
Wisconsin	Shawn Eichorst	Luke Fickell	Greg Gard	Robin Pingeton	No Team	Yvette Healy	Kelly Sheffield

== Broadcasting and media rights ==
=== Fall 2007 – Spring 2017 ===
Commissioner Jim Delany began to explore the formation of a Big Ten-specific channel in 2004 after a failed attempt to seek a significantly larger rights fee from ESPN to renew its existing agreements. This came to fruition in 2006, when the conference announced the formation of a dedicated cable network, Big Ten Network, in a 20-year partnership with Fox Sports, which would officially launch in 2007. The network carries coverage of Big Ten athletics (including events not carried by the Big Ten's other media partners), studio shows, as well as other original programs and documentaries profiling the conference and its members. The impact of Big Ten Network influenced the conference's expansion in the 2010s, with some of its newer members being located in proximity to major media markets such as Baltimore and Washington, D.C. (Maryland), and the New York metropolitan area (Rutgers).

Accompanying the new network announcement was a new ten-year media rights agreement beginning with the 2007–08 season and ending with the 2016–17 season that would split Big Ten coverage among the ESPN networks, CBS Sports, and Big Ten Network, thus ending Comcast Chicago's regional coverage of the conference.

- ABC Sports:
  - 17 football games per season
- ESPN/ESPN2:
  - 24 football games per season
  - 43 men's basketball games per season
    - Rights to the first three rounds of the Big Ten men's basketball tournament, to be shared with Big Ten Network
  - 5 women's basketball games per season
- ESPN Other (U,360):
  - 13 men's basketball games per season
- CBS Sports:
  - 15 men's basketball games per-season
    - Rights to the semi-finals and championship game of the Big Ten men's basketball tournament
  - 2 women's basketball games per-season
- Big Ten Network:
  - 35 football games per season
  - 105 men's basketball games per season
    - Rights to the first three rounds of the Big Ten men's basketball tournament, to be shared with ESPN/ESPN2
  - 55 women's basketball games per season
  - Coverage of Olympic sports events

In 2010, the Big Ten announced the creation of the Big Ten Football Championship game starting with the 2011 season and signed a broadcast deal with Fox to broadcast the game from 2011 through 2016.

=== Fall 2017 – Spring 2023 ===
In 2016, the conference announced a new six-year media rights deal worth $2.64 billion with Fox Sports, CBS Sports, and ESPN to take effect with the start of the 2017–18 season and ending with the 2022–23 season. The size of the deal translated to a near tripling of the per-school media revenue share.

The new deal would see regular season Big Ten football games airing on Fox and Fox Sports 1 for the first time. As part of the deal, Fox would retain its coverage of the Big Ten Championship as well as obtain priority over ESPN when drafting regular season football games prior to each season. It would also put an end to ESPN's coverage of the Big Ten men's basketball tournament.

=== Fall 2023 – Spring 2030 ===
On August 18, 2022, the Big Ten announced that it had reached seven-year broadcast rights deals with Fox, CBS, and for the first time, NBC Sports, beginning in the 2023–24 academic year, ending an association between the conference and ESPN dating back to the 1980s. A major goal for the new contracts was to establish specific broadcast windows for Big Ten football games across its three partners, with Fox, CBS, and NBC primarily holding rights to Noon ET, 3:30 p.m. ET, and primetime games, respectively, and the three broadcasters alternating first pick of games. The contracts were estimated to be worth at least $7 billion, but also reportedly includes an "escalator clause" that will raise the value of the contracts if the Notre Dame Fighting Irish specifically were to join the Big Ten.

- Fox Sports:
  - 24 to 32 football games per season on Fox:
    - Primarily airs in a Noon ET window (Big Noon Saturday), but with the option for games in other windows (such as west coast primetime) after its 2024 expansion.
    - Rights to the Big Ten championship game in 2023, 2025 and 2026.
  - At least 45 men's basketball games per-season on Fox and FS1.
  - Selected women's basketball games and Olympic sport events.
- CBS Sports:
  - 14 to 15 football games per season on CBS and Paramount+:
    - Primarily airing in a 3:30 p.m. ET window beginning in 2024, replacing CBS's previous SEC package (CBS aired seven games in other timeslots during the 2023 season).
    - Includes one Friday afternoon game on Thanksgiving weekend.
    - Rights to the Big Ten championship game in 2024.
  - Up to 15 men's basketball games per-season:
    - Rights to the semi-finals and championship game of the Big Ten men's basketball tournament
    - Rights to the championship game of the Big Ten women's basketball tournament
- NBC Sports:
  - 14 to 16 football games per season on NBC and Peacock:
    - Games will primarily air in a primetime window on NBC
    - Eight games will stream exclusively on Peacock, including four intraconference games.
  - Up to 77 basketball games per-season on Peacock (NBC games added in the 2024–25 season, NBCSN games added in the 2025–26 season):
    - Up to 47 men's basketball games, including 32 intraconference games.
    - Up to 30 women's basketball games, including 20 intraconference games.
    - Rights to the opening night doubleheaders of the men's and women's basketball tournaments.
  - Up to 40 live Olympic sports events per-season on Peacock.
- Big Ten Network:
  - Up to 50 football games per season
    - All Big Ten teams must appear on Big Ten Network twice per-season, with at least one of these being an intraconference game.
  - At least 126 men's basketball games per season
    - Second round and quarter-final games of the Big Ten men's basketball tournament
  - At least 40 women's basketball games per season
    - Coverage of the Big Ten women's basketball tournament (outside of the first round and championship game)
  - Coverage of Olympic sports events

Following the deal's signing, it was later revealed that several schools had issues with playing football games at night in November, with some having formal clauses allowing them to veto games in that timeslot. The conference would also have to compensate Fox $40 million for the 2026 Big Ten championship game, as the conference did not actually have the right to offer the game to NBC. Instead, under the terms of the agreement regarding the operation of Big Ten Network, the channel officially owns the conference's media rights and then sublicenses them out to other channels, thus Fox has a stake in any content BTN sublicenses. In addition, the conference's contracts require each Big Ten team to make at least two appearances on Big Ten Network per-season.

In spring 2026, Fox and NBC reached a deal in which NBC sold the rights to the 2026 Big Ten Championship game to Fox in exchange for $45 to $55 million and some of Fox's Big Ten regular season games.

== Sports ==
The Big Ten Conference sponsors championship competition in 14 men's and 14 women's NCAA sanctioned sports.

Teams in Big Ten Conference competition
Sport	Men's	Women's
Baseball	17	–
Basketball	18	18
Cross country	15	18
Field hockey	–	9
Football	18	–
Golf	18	18
Gymnastics	5	12
Ice hockey	7	–
Lacrosse	6	9
Rowing	–	11
Soccer	11	18
Softball	–	17
Swimming & diving	9	14
Tennis	14	18
Track and field (indoor)	15	17
Track and field (outdoor)	17	17
Volleyball	–	18
Wrestling	14	–

=== Men's sponsored sports by school ===
School	Baseball	Basketball	Cross Country	Football	Golf	Gymnastics	Ice hockey	Lacrosse	Soccer	Swimming Diving	Tennis	Track & Field (Indoor)	Track & Field (Outdoor)	Wrestling	Total
Illinois	Yes	Yes	Yes	Yes	Yes	Yes	No	No	No	No	Yes	Yes	Yes	Yes	10
Indiana	Yes	Yes	Yes	Yes	Yes	No	No	No	Yes	Yes	Yes	Yes	Yes	Yes	11
Iowa	Yes	Yes	Yes	Yes	Yes	No	No	No	No	No	No	Yes	Yes	Yes	8
Maryland	Yes	Yes	No	Yes	Yes	No	No	Yes	Yes	No	No	No	Yes	Yes	8
Michigan	Yes	Yes	Yes	Yes	Yes	Yes	Yes	Yes	Yes	Yes	Yes	Yes	Yes	Yes	14
Michigan State	Yes	Yes	Yes	Yes	Yes	No	Yes	No	Yes	No	Yes	Yes	Yes	Yes	11
Minnesota	Yes	Yes	Yes	Yes	Yes	No	Yes	No	No	Yes	No	No	Yes	Yes	9
Nebraska	Yes	Yes	Yes	Yes	Yes	Yes	No	No	No	No	Yes	Yes	Yes	Yes	10
Northwestern	Yes	Yes	No	Yes	Yes	No	No	No	Yes	Yes	Yes	No	No	Yes	8
Ohio State	Yes	Yes	Yes	Yes	Yes	Yes	Yes	Yes	Yes	Yes	Yes	Yes	Yes	Yes	14
Oregon	Yes	Yes	Yes	Yes	Yes	No	No	No	No	No	Yes	Yes	Yes	No	8
Penn State	Yes	Yes	Yes	Yes	Yes	Yes	Yes	Yes	Yes	Yes	Yes	Yes	Yes	Yes	14
Purdue	Yes	Yes	Yes	Yes	Yes	No	No	No	No	Yes	Yes	Yes	Yes	Yes	10
Rutgers	Yes	Yes	Yes	Yes	Yes	No	No	Yes	Yes	No	No	Yes	Yes	Yes	10
UCLA	Yes	Yes	Yes	Yes	Yes	No	No	No	Yes	No	Yes	Yes	Yes	No	9
USC	Yes	Yes	No	Yes	Yes	No	No	No	No	Yes	Yes	Yes	Yes	No	8
Washington	Yes	Yes	Yes	Yes	Yes	No	No	No	Yes	No	Yes	Yes	Yes	No	9
Wisconsin	No	Yes	Yes	Yes	Yes	No	Yes	No	Yes	Yes	Yes	Yes	Yes	Yes	11
Totals	17	18	15	18	18	5	6+1*	5+1°	11	9	14	15	17	14	148+2
Affiliate Members
Johns Hopkins								Yes							1
Notre Dame							Yes								1

Notes:

- Notre Dame joined the Big Ten in the 2017–18 school year as an affiliate member in men's ice hockey. It continues to field its other sports in the ACC except in football where it will continue to compete as an independent.
- Johns Hopkins joined the Big Ten in 2014 as an affiliate member in men's lacrosse, with women's lacrosse following in 2016. It continues to field its other sports in the NCAA Division III Centennial Conference.

Men's varsity sports not sponsored by the Big Ten Conference that are played by Big Ten schools

School	Fencing	Pistol (Note: Unlike rifle, pistol is not an NCAA-governed sport. It is fully coeducational.)	Rifle (Note: Rifle is technically a men's sport, but men's, women's, and coed teams all compete against each other. Ohio State fields a coed team.)	Rowing (Note: Men's rowing at the varsity level, whether heavyweight or lightweight, is not governed by the NCAA, but instead by the Intercollegiate Rowing Association.)	Volleyball	Water Polo
Ohio State	Independent	Independent	PRC	No	MIVA	No
Penn State	Independent	No	No	No	EIVA	No
Rutgers	No	No	No	No (Note: Rutgers downgraded its men's rowing program from varsity to club status in 2008; it now competes as a member of the American Collegiate Rowing Association.)	No	No
UCLA	No	No	No	No	MPSF	MPSF
USC	No	No	No	No	MPSF	MPSF
Washington	No	No	No	MPSF	No	No
Wisconsin	No	No	No	EARC	No	No

=== Women's sponsored sports by school ===
School	Basketball	Cross Country	Field Hockey	Golf	Gymnastics	Lacrosse	Rowing	Soccer	Softball	Swimming & Diving	Tennis	Track & Field (Indoor)	Track & Field (Outdoor)	Volleyball	Total
Illinois	Yes	Yes	No	Yes	Yes	No	No	Yes	Yes	Yes	Yes	Yes	Yes	Yes	11
Indiana	Yes	Yes	Yes	Yes	No	No	Yes	Yes	Yes	Yes	Yes	Yes	Yes	Yes	12
Iowa	Yes	Yes	Yes	Yes	Yes	No	Yes	Yes	Yes	Yes	Yes	Yes	Yes	Yes	13
Maryland	Yes	Yes	Yes	Yes	Yes	Yes	No	Yes	Yes	No	Yes	Yes	Yes	Yes	12
Michigan	Yes	Yes	Yes	Yes	Yes	Yes	Yes	Yes	Yes	Yes	Yes	Yes	Yes	Yes	14
Michigan State	Yes	Yes	Yes	Yes	Yes	No	Yes	Yes	Yes	No	Yes	Yes	Yes	Yes	12
Minnesota	Yes	Yes	No	Yes	Yes	No	Yes	Yes	Yes	Yes	Yes	Yes	Yes	Yes	12
Nebraska	Yes	Yes	No	Yes	Yes	No	No	Yes	Yes	Yes	Yes	Yes	Yes	Yes	11
Northwestern	Yes	Yes	Yes	Yes	No	Yes	No	Yes	Yes	Yes	Yes	No	No	Yes	10
Ohio State	Yes	Yes	Yes	Yes	Yes	Yes	Yes	Yes	Yes	Yes	Yes	Yes	Yes	Yes	14
Oregon	Yes	Yes	No	Yes	No	Yes	No	Yes	Yes	No	Yes	Yes	Yes	Yes	10
Penn State	Yes	Yes	Yes	Yes	Yes	Yes	No	Yes	Yes	Yes	Yes	Yes	Yes	Yes	13
Purdue	Yes	Yes	No	Yes	No	No	No	Yes	Yes	Yes	Yes	Yes	Yes	Yes	10
Rutgers	Yes	Yes	Yes	Yes	Yes	Yes	Yes	Yes	Yes	Yes	Yes	Yes	Yes	Yes	14
UCLA	Yes	Yes	No	Yes	Yes	No	Yes	Yes	Yes	Yes	Yes	Yes	Yes	Yes	12
USC	Yes	Yes	No	Yes	No	Yes	Yes	Yes	No	Yes	Yes	Yes	Yes	Yes	11
Washington	Yes	Yes	No	Yes	Yes	No	Yes	Yes	Yes	No	Yes	Yes	Yes	Yes	11
Wisconsin	Yes	Yes	No	Yes	No	No	Yes	Yes	Yes	Yes	Yes	Yes	Yes	Yes	11
Totals	18	18	9	18	12	8+1 (Note: Affiliate member: Johns Hopkins)	11	18	17	14	18	17	17	18	172+1
Affiliate Members
Johns Hopkins						Yes									1

Women's varsity sports not sponsored by the Big Ten Conference that are played by Big Ten schools

School	Acrobatics & Tumbling (Note: Graduated from the NCAA Emerging Sports for Women program in January 2026, with the first official NCAA championship in 2026–27. In the 2025–26 season, NCAA-recognized competition is governed by the National Collegiate Acrobatics & Tumbling Association.)	Bowling	Fencing	Flag Football (Note: Part of the NCAA Emerging Sports for Women program.)	Ice Hockey	Lightweight Rowing (Note: The only category of rowing that the NCAA governs is women's heavyweight rowing. Women's lightweight rowing, as with all men's rowing, is governed by the Intercollegiate Rowing Association.)	Pistol (Note: Unlike rifle, pistol is not an NCAA-governed sport. It is fully coeducational.)	Rifle (Note: Rifle is technically a men's sport, but men's, women's, and coed teams all compete against each other. Nebraska fields a women-only team, and Ohio State fields a coed team.)	Synchronized Swimming (Note: Synchronized swimming is not governed by the NCAA. Collegiate competition is governed by United States Synchronized Swimming, the sport's national governing body.)	Water Polo	Beach Volleyball	Wrestling
Indiana	No	No	No	No	No	No	No	No	No	MPSF (Note: Indiana women's water polo will rejoin the CWPA for the 2028 spring season (2027–28 academic year).)	No	No
Iowa	No	No	No	No	No	No	No	No	No	No	No	Independent
Michigan	No	No	No	No	No	No	No	No	No	CWPA	No	No
Minnesota	No	No	No	No	WCHA	No	No	No	No	No	No	No
Nebraska	No	CUSA	No	No (Note: Nebraska will add flag football in 2027–28.)	No	No	No	PRC	No	No	Independent	No
Northwestern	No	No	Central Collegiate Fencing Conference	No	No	No	No	No	No	No	No	No
Ohio State	No	No	Central Collegiate Fencing Conference	No	WCHA	No	Independent	PRC	Independent	No	No	No
Oregon	Independent	No	No	No	No	No	No	No	No	No	MPSF	No
Penn State	No	No	Independent	No	AHA	No	No	No	No	No	No	No
Rutgers	No	No	No	No	No	EARC	No	No	No	No	No	No
UCLA	No	No	No	No	No	No	No	No	No	MPSF	MPSF	No
USC	No	No	No	No	No	No	No	No	No	MPSF	MPSF	No
Washington	No	No	No	No	No	No	No	No	No	No	MPSF	No
Wisconsin	No	No	No	No	WCHA	EARC	No	No	No	No	No	No

== Rivalries ==
=== Intra-conference football rivalries ===
The members of the Big Ten have longstanding rivalries with each other, especially on the football field. Each school, except Maryland and Rutgers, has at least one traveling trophy at stake. The following is a list of active rivalries in the Big Ten Conference with totals & records through the completion of the 2024 season.

Team	Team	Rivalry Name	Trophy	Meetings	Record	Series Leader	Current Streak
Illinois	Indiana	Illinois–Indiana rivalry	—	73	46–25–2	Illinois	Illinois won 1
Illinois	Michigan	Illinois–Michigan football rivalry	—	98	72–24–2	Michigan	Illinois won 1
Illinois	Northwestern	Illinois–Northwestern football rivalry	Land of Lincoln Trophy	118	58–55–5	Illinois	Illinois won 1
Illinois	Ohio State	Illinois–Ohio State football rivalry	Illibuck Trophy	103	68–30–4	Ohio State	Ohio State won 8
Illinois	Purdue	Illinois–Purdue football rivalry	Purdue Cannon	100	48–46–6	Purdue	Illinois won 1
Indiana	Michigan State	Indiana–Michigan State football rivalry	Old Brass Spittoon	71	50–19–2	Michigan State	Indiana won 1
Indiana	Purdue	Indiana–Purdue football rivalry	Old Oaken Bucket	126	77–43–6	Purdue	Indiana won 1
Iowa	Minnesota	Iowa–Minnesota football rivalry	Floyd of Rosedale	119	63–54–2	Minnesota	Iowa won 2
Iowa	Nebraska	Iowa–Nebraska football rivalry	Heroes Trophy	56	30–23–3	Nebraska	Iowa won 3
Iowa	Wisconsin	Iowa–Wisconsin football rivalry	Heartland Trophy	99	49–48–2	Wisconsin	Iowa won 4
Maryland	Penn State	Maryland–Penn State football rivalry	—	48	44–3–1	Penn State	Penn State won 4
Maryland	Rutgers	Maryland–Rutgers football rivalry	—	20	12–8	Maryland	Rutgers won 1
Michigan	Michigan State	Michigan–Michigan State football rivalry	Paul Bunyan Trophy	117	74–38–5	Michigan	Michigan won 3
Michigan	Minnesota	Michigan–Minnesota football rivalry	Little Brown Jug	106	78–25–3	Michigan	Michigan won 5
Michigan	Northwestern	Michigan–Northwestern football rivalry	George Jewett Trophy	77	60–15–2	Michigan	Michigan won 8
Michigan	Ohio State	The Game	—	121	62–52–6	Michigan	Ohio State won 1
Michigan	Penn State	Michigan–Penn State football rivalry	—	27	17–10	Michigan	Michigan won 3
Michigan State	Penn State	Michigan State–Penn State football rivalry	Land Grant Trophy	38	19–18–1	Penn State	Penn State won 2
Minnesota	Nebraska	Minnesota–Nebraska football rivalry	$5 Bits of Broken Chair Trophy	64	37–25–2	Minnesota	Minnesota won 5
Minnesota	Penn State	Minnesota–Penn State football rivalry	Governor's Victory Bell	17	11–6	Penn State	Penn State won 2
Minnesota	Wisconsin	Minnesota–Wisconsin football rivalry	Paul Bunyan's Axe	135	64–63–8	Minnesota	Minnesota won 2
Nebraska	Wisconsin	Nebraska–Wisconsin football rivalry	Freedom Trophy	18	13–5	Wisconsin	Nebraska won 1
Ohio State	Penn State	Ohio State–Penn State football rivalry	—	40	25–14	Ohio State	Ohio State won 8
Oregon	Washington	Oregon–Washington football rivalry	—	117	63–49–5	Washington	Oregon won 1
UCLA	USC	UCLA–USC football rivalry	Victory Bell	94	51–34–7	USC	USC won 1

=== Extra-conference football rivalries ===
Teams		Rivalry name	Trophy	Meetings	Record	Series leader	Existing streak	Opposing conference
Illinois	Missouri	Illinois–Missouri football rivalry	None	24	7–17	Missouri	Illinois lost 6	SEC
Indiana	Kentucky	Indiana–Kentucky football rivalry	None	36	18–17–1	Indiana	Indiana won 1	SEC
Iowa	Iowa State	Iowa–Iowa State football rivalry	Cy-Hawk Trophy	71	47–24	Iowa	Iowa lost 1	Big 12
Maryland	Navy	Maryland–Navy rivalry	Crab Bowl Trophy	21	7–14	Navy	Maryland won 2	The American
Maryland	Virginia	Maryland–Virginia football rivalry	Tydings Trophy	80	46–32–2	Maryland	Maryland won 4	ACC
Maryland	West Virginia	Maryland–West Virginia football rivalry	None	53	23–28–2	West Virginia	Maryland won 1	Big 12
Michigan	Chicago	Chicago–Michigan football rivalry	None	26	19–7	Michigan	Michigan won 3	MWC (D-III)
Michigan	Notre Dame	Michigan–Notre Dame football rivalry	None	44	25–17–1	Michigan	Michigan won 1	Independent
Michigan State	Notre Dame	Michigan State–Notre Dame football rivalry	Megaphone Trophy	79	29–47–1	Notre Dame	Michigan State lost 1	Independent
Nebraska	Colorado	Colorado–Nebraska football rivalry	None	73	50–21–2	Nebraska	Nebraska won 1	Big 12
Nebraska	Kansas	Kansas–Nebraska football rivalry	None	117	91–23–3	Nebraska	Nebraska won 3	Big 12
Nebraska	Kansas State	Kansas State–Nebraska football rivalry	None	95	78–15–2	Nebraska	Nebraska won 6	Big 12
Nebraska	Miami (FL)	Miami–Nebraska football rivalry	None	12	6–6	Tied	Nebraska lost 1	ACC
Nebraska	Missouri	Missouri–Nebraska football rivalry	Missouri-Nebraska Bell	104	65–36–3	Nebraska	Nebraska won 2	SEC
Nebraska	Oklahoma	Nebraska–Oklahoma football rivalry	None	88	38–47–3	Oklahoma	Nebraska lost 3	SEC
Northwestern	Notre Dame	Northwestern–Notre Dame football rivalry	None	49	9–38–2	Notre Dame	Northwestern lost 1	Independent
Oregon	Oregon State	Oregon–Oregon State football rivalry	Platypus Trophy	128	69–49–10	Oregon	Oregon won 2	Pac-12
Penn State	Alabama	Alabama–Penn State football rivalry	None	15	5–10	Alabama	Penn State lost 2	SEC
Penn State	Notre Dame	Notre Dame–Penn State football rivalry	None	20	9–10–1	Notre Dame	Notre Dame won 1	Independent
Penn State	Pittsburgh	Penn State–Pittsburgh football rivalry	Old Ironsides	100	53–43–4	Penn State	Penn State won 3	ACC
Penn State	Syracuse	Penn State–Syracuse football rivalry	None	71	43–23–5	Penn State	Penn State won 5	ACC
Penn State	West Virginia	Penn State–West Virginia football rivalry	Old Ironsides	60	50–9–2	Penn State	Penn State won 6	Big 12
Purdue	Chicago	Chicago–Purdue football rivalry	None	42	14–27–1	Chicago	Purdue won 9	MWC (D-III)
Purdue	Notre Dame	Notre Dame–Purdue football rivalry	Shillelagh Trophy	88	26–58–2	Notre Dame	Purdue lost 7	Independent
Rutgers	Princeton	Princeton–Rutgers rivalry	None	71	17–53–1	Princeton	Rutgers won 5	Ivy League (FCS)
UCLA	California	California–UCLA football rivalry	None	94	57–35–1	UCLA	UCLA lost 1	ACC
UCLA	Stanford	Stanford–UCLA football rivalry	None	95	49–43–3	UCLA	UCLA won 3	ACC
USC	Notre Dame	Notre Dame–USC football rivalry	Jeweled Shillelagh	95	37–50–5	Notre Dame	USC lost 2	Independent
USC	Stanford	Stanford–USC football rivalry	None	103	65–34–3	USC	USC won 2	ACC
Washington	Washington State	Apple Cup	Apple Cup Trophy	116	76–34–6	Washington	Washington won 1	Pac-12

=== Protected matchups ===
Beginning in 2024, the conference will eliminate divisions but will protect certain matchups. The following are the conference's 12 protected matchups.

- Illinois: Northwestern, Purdue
- Indiana: Purdue
- Iowa: Minnesota, Nebraska, Wisconsin
- Maryland: Rutgers
- Michigan: Michigan State, Ohio State
- Michigan State: Michigan
- Minnesota: Iowa, Wisconsin
- Nebraska: Iowa
- Northwestern: Illinois
- Ohio State: Michigan
- Oregon: Washington
- Purdue: Illinois, Indiana
- Rutgers: Maryland
- UCLA: USC
- USC: UCLA
- Washington: Oregon
- Wisconsin: Minnesota, Iowa

From 1993 through 2010, the Big Ten football schedule was set up with each team having two permanent matches within the conference, with the other eight teams in the conference rotating out of the schedule in pairs for two-year stints. Permanent matches were as follows:

- Illinois: Indiana, Northwestern
- Indiana: Illinois, Purdue
- Iowa: Minnesota, Wisconsin
- Michigan: Michigan State, Ohio State
- Michigan State: Michigan, Penn State
- Minnesota: Iowa, Wisconsin
- Northwestern: Illinois, Purdue
- Ohio State: Michigan, Penn State
- Penn State: Michigan State, Ohio State
- Purdue: Indiana, Northwestern
- Wisconsin: Iowa, Minnesota

This system was discontinued after the 2010 season, as teams became grouped into two divisions, and would play all teams in their division once, with one protected cross-over game, and two games rotating against the other five opponents from the opposing division.

Most of the above permanent rivalries were maintained. By virtue of the new alignment, a handful of new permanent divisional opponents were created, as all pairs of teams within the same division would face off each season. Furthermore, three new permanent inter-divisional matches resulted from the realignment: Purdue–Iowa, Michigan State–Indiana, and Penn State–Nebraska. The following past permanent matches were maintained across divisions: Minnesota–Wisconsin, Michigan–Ohio State, and Illinois–Northwestern.

The new alignment, however, caused some of the above permanent rivalries to be discontinued. These were: Iowa–Wisconsin, Northwestern–Purdue, and Michigan State–Penn State. These matchups would continue to be played, but only twice every five years on average. More rivalries were disrupted, and some resumed on a yearly basis, when the league realigned into East and West Divisions for the 2014 season with the addition of Maryland and Rutgers. The two new schools were placed in the new East Division with Penn State, and the two Indiana schools were divided (Indiana to the East and Purdue to the West). With the move to a nine-game conference schedule in 2016, all cross-division games will be held at least once in a four-year cycle except for Indiana–Purdue, which is the only protected cross-division game. The conference later announced that once the new scheduling format takes effect in 2016, members will be prohibited from playing FCS teams, and required to play at least one non-conference game against a team in the Power Five conferences (ACC, Big 12, Pac-12 and SEC; presumably, this would also allow for non-conference games against Big Ten opponents that are not on the conference schedule). Games against independents Notre Dame (an ACC member in non-football sports) also count toward the Power Five requirement, as did games against BYU before it joined the Big 12 in 2023.

=== Intra-conference basketball rivalries ===
- Illinois: Indiana, Iowa, Northwestern
- Indiana: Illinois, Purdue
- Iowa: Illinois, Minnesota, Wisconsin
- Maryland: Penn State
- Michigan: Michigan State, Ohio State
- Michigan State: Michigan, Ohio State, Wisconsin
- Minnesota: Iowa, Wisconsin
- Northwestern: Illinois
- Ohio State: Michigan, Penn State, Michigan State
- Oregon: Washington
- Penn State: Maryland, Ohio State
- Purdue: Indiana
- UCLA: USC
- USC: UCLA
- Washington: Oregon
- Wisconsin: Iowa, Michigan State, Minnesota

=== Extra-conference basketball rivalries ===
- Illinois: Missouri
- Indiana: Kentucky
- Iowa: Iowa State, Iowa Big Four
- Maryland: Duke, Georgetown, Virginia
- Michigan: Duke
- Michigan State: Duke, Oakland
- Nebraska: Creighton
- Penn State: Bucknell, Pittsburgh
- Oregon: Oregon State
- Rutgers: Princeton, Seton Hall
- UCLA: Arizona, Notre Dame
- Washington: Gonzaga, Washington State
- Wisconsin: Green Bay, Marquette, Milwaukee

=== Other sports ===
==== Men's ice hockey ====
- Michigan-Michigan State
- Minnesota-Wisconsin
- Minnesota-North Dakota
- Minnesota-Minnesota Duluth
- Minnesota-St. Cloud State
- Michigan-Notre Dame

==== Men's lacrosse ====
- Maryland-Johns Hopkins
- Penn State-Bucknell
- Rutgers-Princeton

==== Men's soccer ====
- Michigan-Michigan State (Big Bear Trophy)

==== Wrestling ====
- Penn State–Lehigh
- Iowa-Penn State
- Iowa–Iowa State
- Iowa-Oklahoma State
- Rutgers-Princeton

=== Extra-conference rivalries ===
Four Big Ten teams-Purdue, Northwestern, Michigan State and Michigan-had rivalries in football with Notre Dame. After the University of Southern California with 35 wins (including a vacated 2005 win), the Michigan State Spartans have the most wins against the Irish, with 28. The Purdue Boilermakers follow with 26, and Michigan ranks fourth all-time with 24. Northwestern and Notre Dame had a yearly contest, with the winner taking home a shillelagh, much like the winner of the USC–Notre Dame and Purdue–Notre Dame contests now receive. The Northwestern–Notre Dame shillelagh was largely forgotten by the early 1960s and is now solely an element of college football's storied past.

Penn State has a longstanding rivalry with Pittsburgh of the ACC, but the two schools did not meet from 2000 until renewing the rivalry with an alternating home-and-home series from 2016 to 2019. Penn State also has long histories with independent Notre Dame; Temple of The American; Syracuse, and Boston College of the ACC; and West Virginia, of the Big 12 Conference. Additionally, Penn State maintains strong intrastate rivalries with Patriot League universities Bucknell in men's basketball and men's lacrosse, and Lehigh in wrestling. Most of these rivalries were cultivated while Penn State operated independent of conference affiliation; the constraints of playing a full conference schedule, especially in football, have reduced the number of meetings between Penn State and its non-Big Ten rivals.

Iowa has an in-state rivalry with Iowa State of the Big 12, with the winner getting the Cy-Hawk Trophy in football. Iowa and Iowa State also compete annually in the Cy-Hawk Series sponsored by Hy-Vee (as of 2011 this series is now sponsored by The Iowa Corngrowers Association), the competition includes all head-to-head regular season competitions in all sports. Iowa also holds rivalries in basketball with the state's other two Division I programs, Drake and Northern Iowa.

Indiana has an out-of-conference rivalry with Kentucky of the SEC (see Indiana–Kentucky rivalry). While the two schools played in football for many years, the rivalry was rooted in their decades of national success in men's basketball. The two no longer play one another in football, but their basketball rivalry continued until a dispute about game sites ended the series after 2011. In the last season of the rivalry (2011–12), the teams played twice. During the regular season, then-unranked Indiana defeated then-#1 ranked Kentucky 73–72 at Assembly Hall. The Wildcats avenged the loss in the NCAA tournament, defeating Indiana 102–90 in the South Regional final in Atlanta on their way to a national title. The teams next played in the 2016 NCAA tournament, with Indiana winning.

Illinois has a longstanding basketball rivalry with the SEC's Missouri Tigers, with the two men's teams squaring off annually in the "Braggin' Rights" game. It has been held in St. Louis since 1980, first at the St. Louis Arena and since 1994 at the Enterprise Center. This rivalry has been carried over into football as "The Arch Rivalry" with games played at the Edward Jones Dome in St. Louis in 2002 and 2003 and four games in 2007 through 2010.St. Louis Sports Commission: Mizzou and Illinois Agree to Four-Year Football Series in St. Louis

Wisconsin has a long-standing in-state basketball rivalry with Marquette. The series has intensified as of late with both teams having made the Final Four in recent years. The schools also played an annual football game before Marquette abandoned its football program in 1961. The school also has minor rivalries in basketball with the two other Division I members of the University of Wisconsin System, which include the University of Wisconsin–Milwaukee and University of Wisconsin–Green Bay.

Similarly, Nebraska has an in-state rivalry with another Big East school in Creighton, mostly in basketball and baseball.

Minnesota men's ice hockey has a prolific and fierce border rivalry with the University of North Dakota. The two teams played annually between 1948 and 2013 as members of the Western Collegiate Hockey Association prior to the inception of the Big Ten Conference. The rivalry resumed in 2016 in non-conference action.

Maryland has many rivalries outside of the conference, most notably Duke, Virginia, West Virginia, and Navy. Maryland left the Duke and Virginia rivalries behind in the ACC when it joined the Big Ten.

In the early days of the Big Ten, the Chicago–Michigan game was played on Thanksgiving, usually with conference championship implications. It was considered one of the first major rivalries of the conference.

== Facilities ==
Three Big Ten football stadiums seat over 100,000 spectators: Michigan Stadium (Michigan), Beaver Stadium (Penn State), and Ohio Stadium (Ohio State). Only five other college football stadiums have a capacity over 100,000 (as of the 2026 season, all in the Southeastern Conference (SEC)). Michigan Stadium and Beaver Stadium, respectively, are the two largest American football stadiums by capacity in the United States, and all three of the Big Ten's largest venues rank among the ten largest sports stadiums in the world. UCLA plays in the Rose Bowl as its home stadium, which is the location of the Rose Bowl Game for the Big Ten champion. USC plays in the Los Angeles Memorial Coliseum, a publicly owned stadium that is managed and operated by the university, which has hosted two summer Olympic Games in 1932 and 1984, and will again in 2028.

Big Ten schools also play in two of the 10 largest on-campus basketball arenas in the country: Ohio State's Value City Arena and Maryland's Xfinity Center. Additionally, arenas at Indiana, Wisconsin, Illinois, and Penn State rank among the 20 largest on-campus basketball facilities in the United States. As of the current 2026–27 season, the Big Ten Conference is tied with the SEC for the most on-campus basketball arenas with seating capacities of 15,000 or more of any NCAA conference, with five each. Four other Big Ten on-campus arenas seat more than 14,000, two of which (Iowa's Carver–Hawkeye Arena and Minnesota's Williams Arena) formerly seated over 15,000 before recent renovations. (Of the other so-called power conferences in men's basketball, the ACC has two such arenas, the Big East none, and the Big 12 four. Outside of these conferences, the Mountain West Conference has three such arenas and the Pac-12 one.)

=== Football, basketball, baseball, and soccer facilities ===
School	Football stadium	Capacity	Opened	Basketball arena	Capacity	Opened	Baseball stadium	Capacity	Opened	Soccer stadium	Capacity	Opened
Illinois	Gies Memorial Stadium	60,670	1923	State Farm Center	15,544	1963	Illinois Field	3,000	1988	Demirjian Park	700	2021
Indiana	Memorial Stadium	52,626	1960	Simon Skjodt Assembly Hall	17,222	1971	Bart Kaufman Field	2,500	2013	Bill Armstrong Stadium	6,500	1981
Iowa	Kinnick Stadium	69,250	1929	Carver-Hawkeye Arena	14,998	1983	Duane Banks Field	3,000	1974	Iowa Soccer Complex		
Maryland	SECU Stadium	46,185	1950	Xfinity Center	17,950	2002	Bob "Turtle" Smith Stadium	2,500	1965	Ludwig Field	7,000	1995
Michigan	Michigan Stadium	107,601	1927	Crisler Center	12,707	1967	Ray Fisher Stadium	4,000	1923	U-M Soccer Stadium	2,200	2010
Michigan State	Spartan Stadium	75,005	1923	Breslin Student Events Center	14,797	1989	McLane Stadium at Kona Field; Jackson Field	4,000; 13,527	1902; 1996	DeMartin Soccer Complex	2,500	2008
Minnesota	Huntington Bank Stadium	52,525	2009	Williams Arena	14,625	1928	U.S. Bank Stadium; Siebert Field	N/A; 1,420	2016; 2013	Elizabeth Lyle Robbie Stadium	1,000	1999
Nebraska	Memorial Stadium	87,000	1923	Pinnacle Bank Arena	15,500	2013	Haymarket Park	8,500	2001	Barbara Hibner Soccer Stadium	2,500	2015
Northwestern	Ryan Field (Note: The first two home games of the 2026 season were played at Lanny and Sharon Martin Stadium (capacity 12,023).)	35,000	2026	Welsh-Ryan Arena	7,039	1952	Rocky Miller Park	600	1944	Lanny and Sharon Martin Stadium	3,000	2016
Ohio State	Ohio Stadium	104,944	1922	Value City Arena	19,500	1998	Bill Davis Stadium	4,450	1997	Jesse Owens Memorial Stadium	10,000	2001
Oregon	Autzen Stadium	54,000	1967	Matthew Knight Arena	12,364	2011	PK Park	4,000	2009	Papé Field	1,000	2012
Penn State	Beaver Stadium	106,572	1960	Bryce Jordan Center	15,261	1996	Medlar Field	5,570	2006	Jeffrey Field	5,000	1966
Purdue	Ross–Ade Stadium	61,441	1924	Mackey Arena	14,876	1967	Alexander Field	1,500	2013	Folk Field		
Rutgers	SHI Stadium	52,454	1994	Jersey Mike's Arena	8,000	1977	Bainton Field	1,250	2007	Yurcak Field	5,000	1994
UCLA	Rose Bowl	89,702	1922	Pauley Pavilion	13,800	1965	Jackie Robinson Stadium	1,820	1981	Wallis Annenberg Stadium	2,145	2018
USC	Los Angeles Memorial Coliseum	77,500	1923	Galen Center	10,258	2006	Dedeaux Field	2,500	1974	Rawlinson Stadium	2,500	2025
Washington	Alaska Airlines Field at Husky Stadium (Note: To be renamed Columbia Bank Stadium on January 1, 2027.)	70,083	1920	Hec Edmundson Pavilion	10,000	1927	Husky Ballpark	2,200	1998	Husky Soccer Stadium	2,200	1997
Wisconsin	Camp Randall Stadium	76,057	1917	Kohl Center	17,287	1998	Non-baseball school			McClimon Soccer Complex	1,611	1959

=== Ice hockey arenas ===
School	Men's arena	Capacity	Women's arena	Capacity
Michigan	Yost Ice Arena	5,800	No varsity team	
Michigan State	Clarence L. Munn Ice Arena	6,114	No varsity team	
Minnesota	3M Arena at Mariucci	10,257	Ridder Arena	3,400
Notre Dame	Compton Family Ice Arena	5,022	No varsity team	
Ohio State	Value City Arena	17,500	OSU Ice Rink	1,415
Penn State	Pegula Ice Arena	6,014	Pegula Ice Arena	6,014
Wisconsin	Kohl Center	15,359	LaBahn Arena	2,273

== Football ==
When Maryland and Rutgers joined the Big Ten in 2014, the division names were changed to "East" and "West", with Purdue and the six schools in the Central Time Zone in the West and Indiana joining the remaining six Eastern Time Zone schools in the East. The only protected cross-division game is Indiana–Purdue. Beginning in 2016, the Big Ten adopted a nine-game conference schedule. All teams have one cross-division opponent they play annually that changes every six years except for Indiana and Purdue, whose crossover is permanent. The other six opponents are played every three years during that cycle. For 2016–2021, the pairings are Maryland–Minnesota, Michigan-Wisconsin, Michigan State–Northwestern, Ohio State-Nebraska, Penn State–Iowa, and Rutgers–Illinois, and for 2022–2023 the pairings are Maryland–Northwestern, Michigan–Nebraska, Michigan State–Minnesota, Ohio State–Wisconsin, Penn State–Illinois, and Rutgers–Iowa. In 2016, the Big Ten no longer allowed its members to play Football Championship Subdivision (FCS) teams and also requires at least one non-conference game against a school in the Power Five conferences (ACC, Big 12, Pac-12, SEC). Contracts for future games already scheduled against FCS teams would be honored. However, in 2017, the Big Ten started to allow teams to schedule an FCS opponent during years in which they only have four conference home games (odd-numbered years for East division teams, even-numbered years for West division teams). At the time this policy was first announced, games against FBS independents Notre Dame and BYU would count toward the Power Five requirement. ESPN, citing a Big Ten executive, reported in 2015 that the Big Ten would allow exceptions to the Power Five rule on a case-by-case basis, and also that the other FBS independent at that time, Army, had been added to the list of non-Power Five schools that would be counted as Power Five opponents.

In 2024, the addition of Oregon, UCLA, USC, and Washington expanded the Big Ten to 18 teams, resulting in the elimination of football divisions. A schedule consisting of nine conference games and three non-conference games was maintained. At the end of the season, the top two teams in the conference standings will play each other in the Big Ten Football Championship Game. For at least 2024 and 2025, the conference was to adopt what it called the "Flex Protect Plus" model, which called for each conference member to play all the others at home and away at least once during a four-year cycle. Initially, the 11 "protected" matchups were to be played each season. The announcement was made before Oregon and Washington were announced as incoming members. After the expansion to 18 teams was announced, the scheduling model was tweaked into the "Flex Protect XVIII" model, which will maintain the original 11 protected rivalries while adding Oregon–Washington. This model is planned to operate from 2024 to 2028.

- Illinois–Northwestern
- Illinois–Purdue
- Indiana–Purdue
- Iowa–Minnesota
- Iowa–Nebraska
- Iowa–Wisconsin
- Maryland–Rutgers
- Michigan–Michigan State
- Michigan–Ohio State
- Minnesota–Wisconsin
- Oregon–Washington
- UCLA–USC

=== All-time school records ===
This list goes through January 20, 2025. The number of claimed national championships, as well as win–loss–tie records, include all seasons played, regardless of conference membership.

#	Team	Won	Loss	Tied	Win %	Division Championships	Big Ten Championships	Claimed National Championships
1	Ohio State	977	335	53	.735	10	39^{†}	9
2	Michigan	1,011	358	36	.732	4	45	12
3	USC^{††}	881	374	54	.694	0	0	11
4	Penn State	940	410	41	.691	2	4	2
5	Nebraska^{††}	924	430	40	.677	1	0	5
6	Washington^{††}	778	468	50	.620	0	0	2
7	Michigan State	733	490	44	.596	3	9	6
8	Wisconsin	745	524	53	.584	5	14	0
9	UCLA^{††}	638	446	37	.586	0	0	1
10	Oregon^{††}	720	511	46	.582	0	1	0
11	Minnesota	744	549	44	.573	1	18	7
12	Iowa	702	580	39	.546	2	11	5
13	Maryland^{††}	682	627	43	.520	0	0	1
14	Purdue	642	608	48	.513	1	8	0
15	Illinois	644	625	50	.507	0	15	5
16	Rutgers^{††}	676	791	42	.491	0	0	1
17	Northwestern	561	703	44	.448	2	8	0
18	Indiana	506	704	45	.421	0	3	1

- ^{†} Ohio State vacated 12 wins and its Big Ten title in 2010 due to NCAA sanctions.
- ^{††} Numbers of division and conference championships shown reflect Big Ten history only and do not include division and conference championships in former conferences. Washington, Oregon, USC and UCLA joined the Big Ten in 2024, Maryland and Rutgers joined in 2014, and Nebraska joined in 2011.

=== Conference record in the College Football Playoff ===
Team	Won	Loss	Pct.	App.	QF	SF	RU	NC
Ohio State	7	5	.583	7	7	6	1	2
Michigan	2	2	.500	3	3	3	0	1
Penn State	2	1	.667	1	1	1	0	0
Michigan State	0	1	.000	1	1	1	0	0
Oregon^{†}	2	2	.500	2	2	1	0	0
Indiana	3	1	.750	2	1	1	0	1
Total	16	12	.571	16	15	13	1	4

- ^{†} Does not include record prior to joining the conference in 2024.

=== Bowl games ===
Since 1946, the Big Ten champion has had a tie-in with the Rose Bowl Game. Michigan appeared in the first bowl game, the 1902 Rose Bowl. After that, the Big Ten only allowed one other team to participate in the Rose Bowl (the 1920 Ohio State Buckeyes football team), until the agreement struck with the Pacific Coast Conference for the 1947 Rose Bowl. The spread of civilian air travel plus the fact that the US military had publicly encouraged college football during World War II were primary causes of the Big Ten finally allowing the Rose Bowl. From 1946 through 1971, the Big Ten did not allow the same team to represent the conference in consecutive years in the Rose Bowl with an exception made after the 1961 season in which Minnesota played in the 1962 Rose Bowl after playing in the 1961 Rose Bowl due to Ohio State declining the bid because of Ohio State faculty concerns about academics.

It was not until the 1975 season that the Big Ten allowed teams to play in bowl games other than the Rose Bowl. Michigan, which had been shut out of the postseason the previous three years, was the first beneficiary of the new rule when it played in the Orange Bowl vs. Oklahoma. Due to the pre-1975 rules, Big Ten teams such as Michigan and Ohio State have lower numbers of all-time bowl appearances than powerhouse teams from the Big 12 Conference (previously Big Eight and Southwest Conferences) and Southeastern Conference, which always placed multiple teams in bowl games every year.

If additional B1G teams are selected to participate in the College Football Playoff, all other bowl-eligible teams move up one spot in the order.

==== 2026 Bowl Tie-ins ====
Pick	Name	Location	Opposing Conference	Opposing Pick
1	College Football Playoff	Misc.	All FBS Conferences	N/A
2	Citrus Bowl	Orlando, Florida	SEC	2
3	ReliaQuest Bowl	Tampa, Florida	SEC	3–8
4	Las Vegas Bowl	Paradise, Nevada	Former Pac-12	2
5	Music City Bowl	Nashville, Tennessee	SEC	3–8
6	Pinstripe Bowl	New York City	ACC	5–7
7	Cactus Bowl	Phoenix, Arizona	Big 12	6
8	GameAbove Sports Bowl	Detroit, Michigan	MAC	Any

==== Bowl selection procedures ====
Although the pick order usually corresponds to the conference standings, the bowls are not required to make their choices strictly according to the win–loss records; many factors influence bowl selections, especially the likely turnout of the team's fans. Picks are made after CFP selections; the bowl with the #2 pick will have the first pick of the remaining teams in the conference.

For all non-College Football Playoff partners, the bowl partner will request a Big Ten team. The Big Ten will approve or assign another team based on internal selection parameters.

When not hosting a semifinal, the Orange Bowl will select the highest-ranked team from the Big Ten, SEC or Notre Dame to face an ACC opponent. (However, in an 8-game cycle [12 years due to not counting when the Orange Bowl is a semifinal], the Big Ten must be selected at least three times and no more than four times; the SEC similarly will be selected between three and four times while Notre Dame may be selected up to two times.) The Big Ten Champion cannot play in the Orange Bowl. If a Big Ten team is not selected by the Orange Bowl, the Citrus Bowl will submit a request for a Big Ten team.

=== Head coach compensation ===
Guaranteed compensation is due to the coaches regardless of performance. Though most of the pay is directed from the university, some also comes in the form of guaranteed endorsements and other income streams. Most coaches also have performance-based bonuses that can significantly raise their salaries.

In 2025, three Big Ten member schools—Northwestern and USC, private institutions, and Penn State, exempt from most open records laws due to its status as what Pennsylvania calls a "state-related" institution—are not obligated to provide salary information for their head coaches. Both Penn State and Northwestern typically choose to provide this information, although Northwestern has not announced the salary of its current coach.

Institution	Head coach	2025 guaranteed pay
Ohio State	Ryan Day	$9,960,000
Oregon	Dan Lanning	$8,000,000
Nebraska	Matt Rhule	$7,800,000
Washington	Jedd Fisch	$7,750,000
Wisconsin	Luke Fickell	$7,500,000
Penn State	James Franklin (Note: Franklin and Foster were fired during the 2025 season. Moore was fired during the postseason.)	$7,500,000
Iowa	Kirk Ferentz	$7,000,000
Michigan	Sherrone Moore	$6,000,000
Michigan State	Jonathan Smith	$6,000,000
Illinois	Bret Bielema	$6,000,000
Purdue	Barry Odom	$6,000,000
Minnesota	P. J. Fleck	$5,100,000
Indiana	Curt Cignetti	$4,000,000
Rutgers	Greg Schiano	$4,000,000
Maryland	Mike Locksley	$4,000,000
UCLA	DeShaun Foster	$3,100,000
Northwestern	David Braun	N/A
USC	Lincoln Riley	N/A

=== Marching bands ===
All Big Ten member schools have marching bands which perform regularly during the football season. Eleven of the member schools have won the Sudler Trophy, generally considered the most prestigious honor a collegiate marching band can receive. Ten of the 11 have won the award while Big Ten members; the other is UCLA, which received the award when it was in the Pac-12 Conference. The first three Sudler trophies were awarded to Big Ten marching bands—Michigan (1982), Illinois (1983) and Ohio State (1984). The Big Ten has more Sudler Trophy recipients than any other collegiate athletic conference.

=== Conference individual honors ===
Coaches and media of the Big Ten Conference award individual honors at the end of each football season.

== Men's basketball ==
The Big Ten has participated in basketball since 1904, and has led the nation in attendance every season since 1978. Although, they have slightly higher average capacity basketball venues, the attendance edge is largely because Big Ten Conference fans fill a higher percentage of seats than other conferences. It has been a national powerhouse in men's basketball, having multiple championship winners and often sending four or more teams to the NCAA men's basketball tournament. Previous NCAA champions include Indiana with five titles, Michigan and Michigan State each with two, and Wisconsin and Ohio State with one each. Maryland, which joined the Big Ten in 2014, won one NCAA championship as a member of the ACC. UCLA, which joined the conference in 2024, won eleven NCAA championships (1964–1965, 1967–1973, 1975, 1995) as a member of the Pac8/10. Ohio State played in the first NCAA tournament national championship game in 1939, losing to Oregon. Despite this, Jimmy Hull of Ohio State was the first NCAA tournament MVP. The first three tournament MVPs came from the Big Ten (Marv Huffman of Indiana in 1940 and John Katz of Wisconsin in 1941).

Big Ten teams have also experienced success in the postseason National Invitation Tournament (NIT). Since 1974, 13 Big Ten teams have played in the championship game, winning nine championships. Michigan, Ohio State, Penn State, and Minnesota have won two NIT championships, while Indiana and Purdue have won one each. Three other members, Maryland, UCLA, and Nebraska, won NIT titles before they joined the Big Ten. In addition, in 1943 the defunct Helms Athletic Foundation retrospectively awarded national titles to Northwestern for 1931 and Purdue for 1932; then in 1957, it selected Illinois for 1915, Minnesota for 1902 and 1919, and Wisconsin for 1912, 1914 and 1916. Former member Chicago won a post-season national championship series in 1908.

=== Conference Challenges ===
From 1999 to 2022, the Big Ten took part in the ACC–Big Ten Challenge with the Atlantic Coast Conference. The ACC held a 13–8–3 record against the Big Ten; Minnesota, Nebraska, Penn State, Purdue, and Wisconsin are the only Big Ten schools without losing records in the challenge.

From 2015 to 2023, the Big Ten took part in the Gavitt Tipoff Games with the Big East Conference. The Big Ten did well in the challenge, holding a 3–1–4 record against the Big East, only losing the challenge in 2021.

=== All-time school records ===
This list is updated through April 6, 2026 and is listed by win percentage in NCAA Division I men's college basketball.

#	Big Ten	Overall record	Pct.	Big Ten Tournament Championships	Big Ten Regular Season Championships	NCAA National Championships	Claimed Pre-Tournament Championships
1	UCLA	1968–888	.689	0	0	11	0
2	Purdue	1855–1045	.640	3	26	0	1
3	Illinois	1833–1031	.640	4	18	0	1
4	Indiana	1865–1080	.635	0	22	5	0
5	Ohio State	1810–1138	.614	4†	20†	1	0
6	Michigan State	1754–1114	.612	6	17	2	0
7	Michigan	1767–1129	.610	3†	16	2	0
8	Maryland	1604–1056	.603	0	1	1	0
9	Washington	1812–1203	.601	0	0	0	0
10	Iowa	1695–1193–1	.587	3	8	0	0
11	USC	1701–1241	.578	0	0	0	0
12	Minnesota	1677–1248–2	.573	0	8†	0	2†
13	Wisconsin	1653–1237	.572	3	20	1	3
14	Penn State	1508–1211–1	.555	0	0	0	0
15	Oregon	1753–1408	.554	0	0	1	0
16	Nebraska	1529–1410	.520	0	0	0	0
17	Rutgers	1276–1235	.508	0	0	0	0
18	Northwestern	1105–1557–1	.415	0	2	0	1

† Minnesota vacated its 1997 Big Ten Conference regular season title, Michigan vacated its 1998 Big Ten tournament title, and Ohio State vacated its 2002 Big Ten tournament, as well as 2000 and 2002 regular season titles, due to NCAA sanctions. Minnesota was retroactively selected as a national champion by the Helms Athletic Foundation for 1902 and 1919.

=== National championships, Final Fours, and NCAA tournament appearances ===
Big Ten Conference basketball programs have combined to win 11 NCAA men's basketball championships as Big Ten members: Indiana has won five, Michigan and Michigan State has each won two, while Ohio State and Wisconsin have won one national championship each as Big Ten members. Maryland won one national championship while a member of the Atlantic Coast Conference in 2002, Oregon won the first NCAA tournament in 1939, and UCLA won eleven championships between 1964 and 1995. Fifteen teams have advanced to the Final Four at least once in their history. Ten Big Ten schools (Indiana, Michigan State, Illinois, Purdue, Ohio State, Maryland, Iowa, Michigan, Wisconsin, and UCLA) are among the national top 50 in all-time NCAA tournament appearances.

School	Men's NCAA Championships	Men's NCAA Runner-Up	Men's NCAA Final Fours	Men's NCAA Elite Eights	Men's NCAA Sweet Sixteens	Men's NCAA Tournament Appearances
Illinois		**1** (2005)	**6** (1949, 1951, 1952, 1989, 2005, 2026)	**11** (1942, 1949, 1951, 1952, 1963, 1984, 1989, 2001, 2005, 2024, 2026)	**13** (1951, 1952, 1963, 1981, 1984, 1985, 1989, 2001, 2002, 2004, 2005, 2024, 2026)	**36** (1942, 1949, 1951, 1952, 1963, 1981, 1983–1990, 1993–1995, 1997, 1998, 2000–2007, 2009, 2011, 2013, 2021–2026)
Indiana	**5** (1940, 1953, 1976, 1981, 1987)	**1** (2002)	**8** (1940, 1953, 1973, 1976, 1981, 1987, 1992, 2002)	**11** (1940, 1953, 1973, 1975, 1976, 1981, 1984, 1987, 1992, 1993, 2002)	**22** (1953, 1954, 1958, 1967, 1973, 1975, 1976, 1978, 1980, 1981, 1983, 1984, 1987, 1989, 1991–1994, 2002, 2012, 2013, 2016)	**41** (1940, 1953, 1954, 1958, 1967, 1973, 1975, 1976, 1978, 1980–1984, 1986–2003, 2006–2008, 2012, 2013, 2015, 2016, 2022, 2023)
Iowa		**1** (1956)	**3** (1955, 1956, 1980)	**5** (1955, 1956, 1980, 1987, 2026)	**9** (1955, 1956, 1970, 1980, 1983, 1987, 1988, 1999, 2026)	**30** (1955, 1956, 1970, 1979–1983, 1985–1989, 1991–1993, 1996, 1997, 1999, 2001, 2005, 2006, 2014–2016, 2019, 2021–2023, 2026)
Maryland	**1** (2002)		**2** (2001, 2002)	**4** (1973, 1975, 2001, 2002)	**15** (1958, 1973, 1975, 1980, 1984, 1985, 1994, 1995, 1998, 1999, 2001–2003, 2016, 2025)	**30** (1958, 1973, 1975, 1980, 1981, 1983–1986, 1994–2004, 2007, 2009, 2010, 2015–2017, 2019, 2021, 2023, 2025)
Michigan	**2** (1989, 2026)	**4** (1965, 1976, 2013, 2018)	**7** (1964, 1965, 1976, 1989, 2013, 2018, 2026)	**15** (1948, 1964–1966, 1974, 1976, 1977, 1989, 1992, 1994, 2013, 2014, 2018, 2021, 2026)	**19** (1964–1966, 1974, 1976–1977, 1988, 1989, 1992, 1994, 2013, 2014, 2017–2019, 2021, 2022, 2025, 2026)	**30** (1948, 1964–1966, 1974–1977, 1985–1990, 1992, 1994, 1995, 2009, 2011–2014, 2016–2019, 2021, 2022, 2025, 2026)
Michigan State	**2** (1979, 2000)	**1** (2009)	**10** (1957, 1979, 1999–2001, 2005, 2009, 2010, 2015, 2019)	**15** (1957, 1959, 1978, 1979, 1999–2001, 2003, 2005, 2009, 2010, 2014, 2015, 2019, 2025)	**23** (1957, 1959, 1978, 1979, 1986, 1990, 1998–2001, 2003, 2005, 2008–2010, 2012–2015, 2019, 2023, 2025, 2026)	**39** (1957, 1959, 1978, 1979, 1985, 1986, 1990–1992, 1994, 1995, 1998–2019, 2021–2026)
Minnesota				**1** (1990)	**3** (1982, 1989, 1990)	**10** (1982, 1989, 1990, 1999, 2005, 2009, 2010, 2013, 2017, 2019)
Nebraska					**1** (2026)	**8** (1986, 1991–1994, 1998, 2014, 2026)
Northwestern						**2** (2017, 2023)
Ohio State	**1** (1960)	**4** (1939, 1961, 1962, 2007)	**10** (1939, 1944–1946, 1960–1962, 1968, 2007, 2012)	**14** (1939, 1944–1946, 1950, 1960–1962, 1968, 1971, 1992, 2007, 2012, 2013)	**14** (1960–1962, 1968, 1971, 1980, 1983, 1991, 1992, 2007, 2010–2013)	**32** (1939, 1944–1946, 1950, 1960–1962, 1968, 1971, 1980, 1982, 1983, 1985, 1987, 1990–1992, 2006, 2007, 2009–2015, 2018, 2019, 2021, 2022, 2026)
Oregon	**1** (1939)		**2** (1939, 2017)	**7** (1939, 1945, 1960, 2002, 2007, 2016, 2017)	**8** (1960, 2002, 2007, 2013, 2014, 2015, 2016, 2017, 2019, 2021)	**19** (1939, 1945, 1960, 1961, 1995, 2000, 2002, 2003, 2007, 2008, 2013–2017, 2019, 2021, 2024, 2025)
Penn State			**1** (1954)	**2** (1942, 1954)	**4** (1952, 1954, 1955, 2001)	**10** (1942, 1952, 1954, 1955, 1965, 1991, 1996, 2001, 2011, 2023)
Purdue		**2** (1969, 2024)	**3** (1969, 1980, 2024)	**7** (1969, 1980, 1994, 2000, 2019, 2024, 2026)	**16** (1969, 1980, 1988, 1994, 1998–2000, 2009, 2010, 2017–2019, 2022, 2024, 2025, 2026)	**36** (1969, 1977, 1980, 1983–1988, 1990, 1991, 1993–1995, 1997–2000, 2003, 2007–2012, 2015–2019, 2021–2026)
Rutgers			**1** (1976)	**1** (1976)	**2** (1976, 1979)	**8** (1975, 1976, 1979, 1983, 1989, 1991, 2021, 2022)
UCLA	**11** (1964, 1965, 1967–1973, 1975, 1995)	**1** (2006)	**18** (1962, 1964, 1965, 1967–1976, 1995, 2006–2008, 2021)	**22** (1950, 1962, 1964–1965, 1967–1976, 1979, 1992, 1995, 1997, 2006–2008, 2021)	**36** (1952, 1956, 1962–1965, 1967–1979, 1990, 1992, 1995, 1997, 1998, 2000–2002, 2006–2008, 2014, 2015, 2017, 2021–2023)	**52** (1950, 1952, 1956, 1962–1965, 1967–1981, 1983, 1987, 1989–2002, 2005–2009, 2011, 2013–2015, 2017, 2018, 2021–2023, 2025, 2026)
USC			**2** (1940, 1954)	**4** (1940, 1954, 2001, 2021)	**4** (1954, 1961, 2001, 2021)	**20** (1940, 1954, 1960–1961, 1979, 1982, 1985, 1991–1992, 1997, 2001–2002, 2008, 2009, 2011, 2016–2017, 2021–2022, 2023)
Washington			**1** (1953)	**4** (1943, 1948, 1951, 1953)	**6** (1951, 1953, 1984, 1998, 2005, 2006, 2010)	**17** (1943, 1948, 1951, 1953, 1976, 1984, 1985, 1986, 1998, 1999, 2004, 2005, 2006, 2009, 2010, 2011, 2019)
Wisconsin	**1** (1941)	**1** (2015)	**4** (1941, 2000, 2014, 2015)	**6** (1941, 1947, 2000, 2005, 2014, 2015)	**10** (2000, 2003, 2005, 2008, 2011, 2012, 2014–2017)	**29** (1941, 1947, 1994, 1997, 1999–2017, 2019, 2021, 2022, 2024–2026)

Seasons are listed by the calendar years in which they ended. Italics indicate honors earned before the school competed in the Big Ten.

=== Big Ten NCAA tournament champions, runners-up and locations ===
† denotes overtime games. Multiple †'s indicate more than one overtime.

Teams in bold represented the Big Ten at the time of their appearance. Those in bold italics made appearances before joining the conference.

Year	Champion		Runner-up		Venue and city (Note: The count of host cities refers to the number of times each city has hosted, not each specific venue.)	
1939	**Oregon**	46	**Ohio State**	33	Patten Gymnasium	Evanston, Illinois
1940	**Indiana**	60	Kansas	42	Municipal Auditorium	Kansas City, Missouri
1941	**Wisconsin**	39	Washington State	34	Municipal Auditorium	Kansas City, Missouri (2)
1953	**Indiana** (2)	69	Kansas	68	Municipal Auditorium	Kansas City, Missouri (4)
1956	San Francisco (2)	83	**Iowa**	71	McGaw Hall	Evanston, Illinois (2)
1960	**Ohio State**	75	California	55	Cow Palace	Daly City, California
1961†	Cincinnati	70	**Ohio State**	65	Municipal Auditorium	Kansas City, Missouri (8)
1962	Cincinnati (2)	71	**Ohio State**	59	Freedom Hall	Louisville, Kentucky (3)
1964	**UCLA**	98	Duke	83	Municipal Auditorium	Kansas City, Missouri (9)
1965	**UCLA** (2)	91	**Michigan**	80	Memorial Coliseum	Portland, Oregon
1967	**UCLA** (3)	79	Dayton	64	Freedom Hall	Louisville, Kentucky (6)
1968	**UCLA** (4)	78	North Carolina	55	Los Angeles Sports Arena	Los Angeles, California
1969	**UCLA** (5)	92	**Purdue**	72	Freedom Hall	Louisville, Kentucky (6)
1970	**UCLA** (6)	80	Jacksonville	69	Cole Field House	College Park, Maryland (2)
1971	**UCLA** (7)	68	Villanova (Note: Participation vacated due to major NCAA violations.)	62	Astrodome	Houston, Texas
1972	**UCLA** (8)	81	Florida State	76	Los Angeles Memorial Sports Arena	Los Angeles, California (2)
1973	**UCLA** (9)	87	Memphis State	66	St. Louis Arena	St. Louis, Missouri
1975	**UCLA** (10)	92	Kentucky	85	San Diego Sports Arena	San Diego, California
1976	**Indiana** (3)	86	**Michigan**	68	The Spectrum	Philadelphia, Pennsylvania
1979	**Michigan State**	75	Indiana State	64	Special Events Center	Salt Lake City, Utah
1980	Louisville	59	**UCLA**	54	Market Square Arena	Indianapolis, Indiana
1981	**Indiana** (4)	63	North Carolina	50	The Spectrum	Philadelphia, Pennsylvania (2)
1987	**Indiana** (5)	74	Syracuse	73	Louisiana Superdome	New Orleans, Louisiana (2)
1989†	**Michigan**	80	Seton Hall	79	Kingdome	Seattle, Washington (4)
1992	Duke (2)	71	**Michigan** (Note: Participation vacated due to major NCAA violations.)	51	Metrodome	Minneapolis, Minnesota
1993	North Carolina (3)	77	**Michigan**	71	Louisiana Superdome	New Orleans, Louisiana (3)
1995	**UCLA** (11)	89	Arkansas	78	Kingdome	Seattle, Washington (3)
2000	**Michigan State** (2)	89	Florida	76	RCA Dome	Indianapolis, Indiana (4)
2002	**Maryland**	64	**Indiana**	52	Georgia Dome	Atlanta, Georgia (2)
2005	North Carolina (4)	75	**Illinois**	70	Edward Jones Dome	St. Louis, Missouri (3)
2006	Florida	73	**UCLA**	57	RCA Dome	Indianapolis, Indiana (5)
2007	Florida (2)	84	**Ohio State**	75	Georgia Dome	Atlanta, Georgia (3)
2009	North Carolina (5)	89	**Michigan State**	72	Ford Field	Detroit, Michigan
2013	Louisville (Note: Participation and title vacated due to major NCAA violations.)	82	**Michigan**	76	Georgia Dome	Atlanta, Georgia (4)
2015	Duke (5)	68	**Wisconsin**	63	Lucas Oil Stadium	Indianapolis, Indiana (7)
2018	Villanova (3)	79	**Michigan**	62	Alamodome	San Antonio, Texas (4)
2024	UConn (6)	75	**Purdue**	60	State Farm Stadium	Glendale, Arizona (2)
2026	**Michigan** (2)	69	UConn	63	Lucas Oil Stadium	Indianapolis, Indiana (9)

=== Big Ten Post-season NIT championships and runners-up ===
Year	Champion		Runner-up		MVP	Venue and city	
1972	**Maryland**	100	Niagara	69	Tom McMillen, Maryland	Madison Square Garden	New York City
1974	**Purdue**	87	Utah	81	Mike Sojourner, Utah	Madison Square Garden	New York City
1979	**Indiana**	53	Purdue	52	Butch Carter and Ray Tolbert, Indiana	Madison Square Garden	New York City
1980	Virginia	58	**Minnesota**	55	Ralph Sampson, Virginia	Madison Square Garden	New York City
1982	Bradley	68	**Purdue**	61	Mitchell Anderson, Bradley	Madison Square Garden	New York City
1984	**Michigan**	83	Notre Dame	63	Tim McCormick, Michigan	Madison Square Garden	New York City
1985	**UCLA**	65	**Indiana**	62	Reggie Miller, UCLA	Madison Square Garden	New York City
1986	**Ohio State**	73	Wyoming	63	Brad Sellers, Ohio State	Madison Square Garden	New York City
1988	UConn (Note: Then known athletically as Connecticut.)	72	**Ohio State**	67	Phil Gamble, UConn	Madison Square Garden	New York City
1993	**Minnesota**	62	Georgetown	61	Voshon Lenard, Minnesota	Madison Square Garden	New York City
1996	**Nebraska**	60	Saint Joseph's	56	Erick Strickland, Nebraska	Madison Square Garden	New York City
1997	**Michigan** (Note: Participation and title vacated due to major NCAA violations.)	82	Florida State	73	Robert Traylor, Michigan	Madison Square Garden	New York City
1998	**Minnesota** (Note: Participation and title vacated due to major NCAA violations.)	79	Penn State	72	Kevin Clark, Minnesota	Madison Square Garden	New York City
2004	**Michigan**	62	**Rutgers**	55	Daniel Horton, Michigan	Madison Square Garden	New York City
2006	South Carolina	76	**Michigan**	64	Renaldo Balkman, South Carolina	Madison Square Garden	New York City
2008	**Ohio State**	92	UMass	85	Kosta Koufos, Ohio State	Madison Square Garden	New York City
2009	**Penn State**	69	Baylor	63	Jamelle Cornley, Penn State	Madison Square Garden	New York City
2012	Stanford	75	**Minnesota**	51	Aaron Bright, Stanford	Madison Square Garden	New York City
2013	Baylor	74	**Iowa**	54	Pierre Jackson, Baylor	Madison Square Garden	New York City
2014	**Minnesota**	65	SMU	63	Austin Hollins, Minnesota	Madison Square Garden	New York City
2018	**Penn State**	82	Utah	66	Lamar Stevens, Penn State	Madison Square Garden	New York City

=== Head coach compensation ===
Guaranteed compensation is due to the coaches regardless of performance. Though most of the pay is directed from the university, some also comes in the form of guaranteed endorsements and other income streams. Most coaches also have performance-based bonuses that can significantly raise their salaries.

In 2024, three Big Ten member schools—Northwestern and USC, private institutions, and Penn State, exempt from most open records laws due to its status as what Pennsylvania calls a "state-related" institution—are not obligated to provide salary information for their head coaches. Despite this, both Penn State and Northwestern typically choose to provide this information.

Institution	Head coach	2023–2024 guaranteed pay
Michigan State	Tom Izzo	$6,200,000
Illinois	Brad Underwood	$4,600,000
Indiana	Darian DeVries	$4,200,000
UCLA	Mick Cronin	$4,100,000
Maryland	Kevin Willard	$4,000,000
Oregon	Dana Altman	$3,775,000
Purdue	Matt Painter	$3,550,000
Wisconsin	Greg Gard	$3,550,000
Ohio State	Jake Diebler	$2,500,000
Michigan	Dusty May	$3,750,000
Rutgers	Steve Pikiell	$3,250,000
Nebraska	Fred Hoiberg	$3,250,000
Iowa	Ben McCollum	$3,200,000
Washington	Danny Sprinkle	$3,600,000
Penn State	Mike Rhoades	$2,900,000
Minnesota	Ben Johnson	$1,950,000
Northwestern	Chris Collins	$2,893,064
USC	Eric Musselman	N/A

== Women's basketball ==
Big Ten women's basketball teams have played a total of 18 championship games of the three most prominent national postseason tournaments—seven in the NCAA Division I women's basketball tournament (since 1982), one in the Women's Basketball Invitation Tournament (since 2024), and 10 in the Women's National Invitation Tournament (since 1998). Three other championship game appearances (five in the NCAA, three in the WNIT) were made by Big Ten members before they joined the conference.

Purdue (1999) and UCLA (2026) are the only Big Ten members to have won the NCAA women's basketball national title while a member of the conference. UCLA, Rutgers, USC and Maryland won national titles before joining the Big Ten. UCLA won the 1978 AIAW championship as a member of the WCAA, Rutgers won the final AIAW championship in 1982 as a member of the Eastern 8, USC won the first two NCAA-sponsored titles back-to-back in 1983 and 1984 as a member of the WCAA, and Maryland won the NCAA title in 2006 as a member of the ACC. Big Ten women's basketball led conference attendance from 1993 to 1999.

Like the men's teams, the women's basketball teams in the Big Ten participated in the Big Ten–ACC Women's Challenge, which was founded in 2007 and ended in 2022. The Big Ten's record in the challenge was 1–11–3, with Indiana, Maryland, and Michigan being the only Big Ten teams without a losing record in the challenge.

=== National championships, Final Fours, and NCAA tournament appearances ===
Seasons are listed by the calendar years in which they ended. Italics indicate seasons before the school competed in the Big Ten.

School	Women's AIAW/NCAA Championships	Women's AIAW/NCAA Final Fours	Women's AIAW/NCAA Elite Eights	Women's AIAW/NCAA Sweet Sixteens	Women's AIAW/NCAA Tournament Appearances
Illinois				**2** (1997, 1998)	**11** (1982, 1986, 1987, 1997–2000, 2003, 2023, 2025, 2026)
Indiana		**1** (1973)	**3** (1972, 1974, 2021)	**3** (2021, 2022, 2024)	**11** (1983, 1994, 1995, 2002, 2016, 2019, 2021–2025)
Iowa		**3** (1993, 2023, 2024)	**6** (1987, 1988, 1993, 2019, 2023, 2024)	**10** (1987, 1988, 1989, 1993, 1996, 2015, 2019, 2021, 2023, 2024)	**32** (1986–1994, 1996–1998, 2001, 2002, 2004, 2006, 2008–2015, 2018–2019, 2021–2026)
Maryland	**1** (2006)	**6** (1978, 1982, 1989, 2006, 2014, 2015)	**15** (1978–1982, 1988, 1989, 1992, 2006, 2008, 2009, 2012, 2014, 2015, 2023)	**21** (1978–1983, 1988, 1989, 1992, 2006, 2008, 2009, 2012–2014, 2015, 2017, 2021–2023, 2025)	**37** (1978–1984, 1986, 1988–1993, 1997, 2001, 2004–2009, 2011–2014, 2015–2019, 2021–2026)
Michigan			**2** (2022, 2026)	**3** (2021, 2022, 2026)	**14** (1990, 1998, 2000, 2001, 2012, 2013, 2018, 2019, 2021–2026)
Michigan State		**1** (2005)	**1** (2005)	**3** (2005, 2006, 2009)	**22** (1977, 1991, 1996, 1997, 2003–2007, 2009–2014, 2016, 2017, 2019, 2021, 2024–2026)
Minnesota		**1** (2004)	**1** (2004)	**5** (1977, 2003, 2004, 2005, 2026)	**14** (1977, 1981, 1982, 1994, 2002–2006, 2008, 2009, 2015, 2018, 2026)
Nebraska				**2** (2010, 2013)	**18** (1988, 1993, 1996, 1998–2000, 2007, 2008, 2010, 2012–2015, 2018, 2022, 2024–2026)
Northwestern					**11** (1979–1982, 1987, 1990, 1991, 1993, 1997, 2015, 2021)
Ohio State		**1** (1993)	**5** (1975, 1985, 1987, 1993, 2023)	**13** (1985–1989, 1993, 2005, 2009, 2011, 2016, 2022, 2023, 2026)	**29** (1975, 1978, 1984–1990, 1993, 1996, 1999, 2003–2012, 2015, 2016, 2022–2026)
Oregon		**1** (2019)	**3** (2017–2019)	**5** (1981, 2017–2019, 2021)	**21** (1980–1982, 1984, 1987, 1994–2001, 2005, 2017–2019, 2021, 2022, 2025, 2026)
Penn State		**1** (2000)	**4** (1983, 1994, 2000, 2004)	**13** (1982, 1983, 1985, 1986, 1992, 1994, 1996, 2000, 2002–2004, 2012, 2014)	**26** (1976, 1982–1988, 1990, 1991, 1992–1996, 1999–2005, 2011–2014)
Purdue	**1** (1999)	**3** (1994, 1999, 2001)	**8** (1994, 1995, 1998, 1999, 2001, 2003, 2007, 2009)	**12** (1990, 1992, 1994, 1995, 1998, 1999, 2001, 2003, 2004, 2006, 2007, 2009)	**27** (1989–1992, 1994–2009, 2011–2014, 2016, 2017, 2023)
Rutgers	**1** (1982)	**3** (1982, 2000, 2007)	**7** (1986, 1987, 1999, 2000, 2005, 2007, 2008)	**11** (1986–1988, 1998–2000, 2005–2009)	**30** (1979–1982, 1986–1994, 1998–2001, 2003–2012, 2015, 2019, 2021)
UCLA	**2** (1978, 2026)	**4** (1978, 1979, 2025, 2026)	**6** (1978, 1979, 1999, 2018, 2025, 2026)	**13** (1978, 1979, 1985, 1992, 1999, 2016–2019, 2023, 2024, 2025, 2026)	**24** (1978, 1979, 1981, 1983, 1985, 1990, 1992, 1998–2000, 2004, 2006, 2010, 2011, 2013, 2016–2019, 2021, 2023, 2024, 2025, 2026)
USC	**2** (1983, 1984)	**4** (1981, 1983, 1984, 1986)	**9** (1981–1984, 1986, 1992, 1994, 2024, 2025)	**13** (1981–1988, 1992–1994, 2024, 2025)	**22** (1980–1988, 1991–1995, 1997, 2005, 2006, 2014, 2023, 2024, 2025, 2026)
Washington		**1** (2016)	**3** (1990, 2001, 2016)	**7** (1988, 1990, 1991, 1995, 2001, 2016, 2017)	**22** (1978, 1985–1991, 1993–1995, 1997, 1998, 2001, 2003, 2006, 2007, 2015–2017, 2025, 2026)
Wisconsin			**1** (1982)		**8** (1982, 1992, 1995, 1996, 1998, 2001, 2002, 2010)

=== Big Ten NCAA tournament champions, runners-up and locations ===
Bold type indicates teams that competed as Big Ten members. Bold italics indicates teams that later became Big Ten members.

Year	Champion		Runner-up		Venue and city	
1983	**USC**	69	Louisiana Tech	67	Norfolk Scope	Norfolk, Virginia
1984	**USC**	72	Tennessee	61	Pauley Pavilion	Los Angeles, California
1986	Texas	97	**USC**	81	Rupp Arena	Lexington, Kentucky
1993	Texas Tech	84	**Ohio State**	82	The Omni	Atlanta, Georgia
1999	**Purdue**	62	Duke	45	San Jose Arena	San Jose, California
2001	Notre Dame	68	**Purdue**	66	Savvis Center	St. Louis, Missouri
2005	Baylor	84	**Michigan State**	62	RCA Dome	Indianapolis, Indiana
2006	**Maryland**	78	Duke	75	TD Banknorth Garden	Boston, Massachusetts
2007	Tennessee	59	**Rutgers**	46	Quicken Loans Arena	Cleveland, Ohio
2023	LSU	102	**Iowa**	85	American Airlines Center	Dallas, Texas
2024	South Carolina	87	**Iowa**	75	Rocket Mortgage Fieldhouse	Cleveland, Ohio
2026	**UCLA**	79	South Carolina	51	Mortgage Matchup Center	Phoenix, Arizona

=== Big Ten Women's Basketball Invitation Tournament championship games ===
Year	Champion		Runner-up		Venue	City
2024	**Illinois**	**71**	Villanova	57	Hinkle Fieldhouse	Indianapolis
2025	**Minnesota**	**75**	Belmont	63	Hinkle Fieldhouse	Indianapolis

=== Big Ten Women's National Invitation Tournament championship games ===
Bold type indicates teams that competed as Big Ten members. Bold italics indicates teams that later became Big Ten members.

Year	Champion		Runner-up		Venue	City
1998	**Penn State**	59	Baylor	56	Ferrell Center	Waco, Texas
1999	Arkansas	67	**Wisconsin**	64	Bud Walton Arena	Fayetteville, Arkansas
2000	**Wisconsin**	75	Florida	74	Kohl Center	Madison, Wisconsin
2001	**Ohio State**	62	New Mexico	61	University Arena	Albuquerque, New Mexico
2007	Wyoming	72	**Wisconsin**	56	Arena-Auditorium	Laramie, Wyoming
2008	Marquette	81	**Michigan State**	66	Breslin Center	East Lansing, Michigan
2011	Toledo	76	**USC**	68	Savage Arena	Toledo, Ohio
2014	**Rutgers**	56	UTEP	54	Don Haskins Center	El Paso, Texas
2015	**UCLA**	62	West Virginia	60	Charleston Civic Center	Charleston, West Virginia
2017	**Michigan**	89	Georgia Tech	79	Calihan Hall	Detroit, Michigan
2018	**Indiana**	65	Virginia Tech	57	Simon Skjodt Assembly Hall	Bloomington, Indiana
2019	Arizona	56	**Northwestern**	42	McKale Center	Tucson, Arizona
2024	Saint Louis	56	**Minnesota**	42	Vadalabene Center	Edwardsville, Illinois

== Volleyball ==
=== National championships, Final Fours, and NCAA tournament appearances ===
Seasons are listed by the calendar years in which they ended. Italics indicate seasons before the school competed in the Big Ten.

School	AIAW/NCAA Championships	AIAW/NCAA Runner-Up	AIAW/NCAA Semifinals	AIAW/NCAA Regional Finals	AIAW/NCAA Regional Semifinals	AIAW/NCAA Tournament Appearances	Conference Championships
Illinois		**1** (2011)	**4** (1987, 1988, 2011, 2018)	**7** (1986–1989, 1992, 2011, 2018)	**19** (1985–1989, 1992, 1995, 1998, 2003, 2008–2011, 2013–2015, 2017, 2018, 2021)	**30** (1977, 1980, 1985–1995, 1998, 1999, 2001, 2003, 2004, 2008–2011, 2013–2015, 2017–2019, 2021, 2024)	**4** (1986, 1987, 1988, 1992)
Indiana					**2** (2010, 2025)	**6** (1995, 1998, 1999, 2002, 2010, 2025)	
Iowa						**2** (1989, 1994)	
Maryland						**7** (1990, 1995–1997, 2003–2005)	**5** (1990, 1996, 2003–2005)
Michigan			**1** (2012)	**2** (2009, 2012)	**7** (2007–2009, 2011, 2012, 2016, 2018)	**22** (1981, 1997, 1999, 2000, 2002–2004, 2006–2013, 2015–2019, 2021, 2025)	**1** (1981)
Michigan State			**1** (1995)	**3** (1995, 1996, 2017)	**7** (1995, 1996, 2002, 2007, 2012, 2013, 2017)	**22** (1975, 1976, 1994–2003, 2006, 2007, 2009, 2011–2017)	**4** (1975, 1976, 1995, 1996)
Minnesota		**1** (2004)	**6** (2003, 2004, 2009, 2015, 2016, 2019)	**9** (2003, 2004, 2006, 2009, 2012, 2015, 2016, 2019, 2021)	**22** (1989, 1993, 1999, 2000, 2002–2004, 2006, 2009–2013, 2015–2022, 2025)	**30** (1989, 1993, 1996, 1997, 1999–2013, 2015–2025)	**3** (2002, 2015, 2018)
Nebraska	**5** (1995, 2000, 2006, 2015, 2017)	**6** (1986, 1989, 2005, 2018, 2021, 2023)	**18** (1986, 1989, 1990, 1995, 1996, 1998, 2000, 2001, 2005, 2006, 2008, 2015–2018, 2021, 2023, 2024)	**34** (1984–1987, 1989–1991, 1994–1998, 2000–2002, 2004–2009, 2012–2021, 2023–2025)	**41** (1982, 1984–1992, 1994–2010, 2012–2025)	**50** (1975–1980, 1982–2010, 2011–2025)	**37** (1976–1992, 1994–1996, 1998–2002, 2004–2008, 2010, 2011, 2016, 2017, 2023–2025)
Northwestern					**1** (1981)	**8** (1981–1984, 2002, 2003, 2005, 2010)	**2** (1983, 1984)
Ohio State			**2** (1991, 1994)	**4** (1991, 1994, 2004, 2022)	**19** (1989, 1991, 1993–1997, 2001, 2002, 2004, 2006, 2010, 2011, 2014–2016, 2020–2022)	**35** (1972–1981, 1989–1998, 2001, 2002, 2004–2006, 2009–2012, 2014–2016, 2020–2022)	**3** (1989, 1991, 1994)
Oregon		**1** (2012)	**1** (2012)	**4** (2012, 2018, 2022, 2023)	**10** (1984, 2007, 2008, 2012, 2014, 2018, 2020, 2022, 2023, 2024)	**29** (1973–1980, 1984, 1986, 1987, 1989, 2006–2009, 2011–2018, 2020–2023, 2024)	
Penn State	**8** (1999, 2007–2010, 2013, 2014, 2024)	**3** (1993, 1997, 1998)	**14** (1993, 1994, 1997–1999, 2007–2010, 2012–2014, 2017, 2024)	**21** (1990, 1993, 1994, 1996–2000, 2003, 2006–2010, 2012–2014, 2017–2019, 2024)	**36** (1981, 1983, 1984, 1986, 1990, 1991–2000, 2003–2020, 2022–2024)	**46** (1980–1990, 1991–2025)	**26** (1983–1990, 1992, 1993, 1996–1999, 2003–2010, 2012, 2013, 2017, 2024)
Purdue				**6** (1982, 2010, 2013, 2020, 2021, 2025)	**17** (1981–1983, 1985, 1987, 2005, 2006, 2008, 2010–2013, 2019–2021, 2023, 2025)	**28** (1978, 1979, 1981–1985, 1987, 1990, 2004–2008, 2010–2013, 2015–2023, 2025)	**2** (1982, 1985)
Rutgers						**1** (1982)	**1** (1982)
UCLA	**7** (1972, 1974, 1975, 1984, 1990, 1991, 2011)	**7** (1970, 1976, 1978, 1981, 1983, 1992, 1994)	**17** (1972–1973, 1977, 1979, 1980, 1981, 1983–1985, 1988–1992, 1994, 2006, 2011)	**22** (1981–1985, 1988–1995, 1999–2001, 2003, 2004, 2006, 2007, 2011, 2016)	**29** (1981–1985, 1987–1995, 1999–2001, 2003–2008, 2011, 2014–2017, 2021)	**50** (1970, 1972–1995, 1997–2009, 2011, 2012, 2014–2017, 2019–2021, 2025)	**7** (1986, 1988, 1989, 1990, 1992, 1993, 1999)
USC	**6** (1976, 1977, 1980, 1981, 2002, 2003)	**1** (1982)	**13** (1976, 1977, 1980–1982, 1985, 2000, 2002–2004, 2007, 2010, 2011)	**17** (1981, 1982, 1984, 1985, 1994, 2000–2004, 2007, 2010–2013, 2015, 2017)	**24** (1981, 1982, 1984, 1985, 1991, 1992, 1994–1998, 2000–2004, 2006, 2007, 2010–2013, 2015, 2017)	**42** (1970, 1976–1978, 1980–1985, 1987–1989, 1991–1993, 1995–2019, 2022)	**5** (2000, 2002, 2003, 2011, 2015)
Washington	**1** (2005)		**5** (2004–2006, 2013, 2020)	**12** (1988, 2003–2006, 2008, 2010, 2013, 2015, 2016, 2019, 2020)	**18** (1979, 1980, 1988, 1997, 2003–2006, 2008, 2010, 2012–2016, 2018–2020)	**30** (1979, 1980, 1986, 1988, 1989, 1994, 1996, 1997, 2002–2022, 2024)	**7** (1980, 2004, 2005, 2013, 2015, 2016, 2020)
Wisconsin	**1** (2021)	**3** (2000, 2013, 2019)	**7** (2000, 2013, 2019–2021, 2023, 2025)	**16** (1997, 1998, 2000, 2004, 2005, 2013, 2014, 2016, 2018–2025)	**23** (1990, 1991, 1996–1998, 2000, 2001, 2004–2006, 2013–2025)	**29** (1990, 1991, 1993, 1994, 1996–2007, 2013–2025)	**9** (1990, 1997, 2000, 2001, 2014, 2019–2022)

=== NCAA volleyball champions, runners-up, and scores ===
Note: Teams in bold are current Big Ten members who advanced to the championship while in the conference. Teams in bold italics are current Big Ten members who were either in another conference or an independent at the time of their appearance.

Year	Champion	Runner-up	Score	Venue	
1981	**USC**	**UCLA**	3–2	Pauley Pavilion	Los Angeles, California
1982	Hawaii	**USC**	3–2	Alex G. Spanos Center	Stockton, California
1983	Hawaii (2)	**UCLA**	3–0	Memorial Coliseum	Lexington, Kentucky
1984	**UCLA**	Stanford	3–2	Pauley Pavilion	Los Angeles, California
1986	Pacific (2)	**Nebraska**	3–0	Alex G. Spanos Center	Stockton, California
1989	Long Beach State	**Nebraska**	3–0	Blaisdell Arena	Honolulu, Hawaii
1990	**UCLA** (2)	Pacific	3–0	Cole Field House	College Park, Maryland
1991	**UCLA** (3)	Long Beach State	3–2	Pauley Pavilion	Los Angeles, California
1992	Stanford	**UCLA**	3–1	University Arena	Albuquerque, New Mexico
1993	Long Beach State (2)	**Penn State**	3–1	UW Field House	Madison, Wisconsin
1994	Stanford (2)	**UCLA**	3–1	Frank Erwin Center	Austin, Texas
1995	**Nebraska**	Texas	3–1	Mullins Center	Amherst, Massachusetts
1997	Stanford (4)	**Penn State**	3–2	Spokane Arena	Spokane, Washington
1998	Long Beach State (3)	**Penn State**	3–2	Kohl Center	Madison, Wisconsin
1999	**Penn State**	Stanford	3–0	Stan Sheriff Center	Honolulu, Hawaii
2000	**Nebraska** (2)	**Wisconsin**	3–2	Richmond Coliseum	Richmond, Virginia
2002	**USC** (2)	Stanford	3–1	New Orleans Arena	New Orleans, Louisiana
2003	**USC** (3)	Florida	3–1	Reunion Arena	Dallas, Texas
2004	Stanford (6)	**Minnesota**	3–0	Long Beach Arena	Long Beach, California
2005	**Washington**	**Nebraska**	3–0	Alamodome	San Antonio, Texas
2006	**Nebraska** (3)	Stanford	3–0	Qwest Center	Omaha, Nebraska
2007	**Penn State** (2)	Stanford	3–2	ARCO Arena	Sacramento, California
2008	**Penn State** (3)	Stanford	3–0	Qwest Center	Omaha, Nebraska
2009	**Penn State** (4)	Texas	3–2	St. Pete Times Forum	Tampa, Florida
2010	**Penn State** (5)	California	3–0	Sprint Center	Kansas City, Missouri
2011	**UCLA** (4)	**Illinois**	3–1	Alamodome	San Antonio, Texas
2012	Texas (2)	**Oregon**	3–0	KFC Yum! Center	Louisville, Kentucky
2013	**Penn State** (6)	**Wisconsin**	3–1	KeyArena	Seattle, Washington
2014	**Penn State** (7)	BYU	3–0	Chesapeake Energy Arena	Oklahoma City, Oklahoma
2015	**Nebraska** (4)	Texas	3–0	CenturyLink Center Omaha	Omaha, Nebraska
2016	**Stanford** (7)	Texas	3–1	Nationwide Arena	Columbus, Ohio
2017	**Nebraska** (5)	Florida	3–1	Sprint Center	Kansas City, Missouri
2018	Stanford (8)	**Nebraska**	3–2	Target Center	Minneapolis, Minnesota
2019	Stanford (9)	**Wisconsin**	3–0	PPG Paints Arena	Pittsburgh, Pennsylvania
2021	**Wisconsin**	**Nebraska**	3–2	Nationwide Arena	Columbus, Ohio
2023	Texas (4)	**Nebraska**	3–0	Amalie Arena	Tampa, Florida
2024	**Penn State** (8)	Louisville	3–1	KFC Yum! Center	Louisville, Kentucky
2025	Texas A&M	Kentucky	3–0	T-Mobile Center	Kansas City, Missouri

== Field hockey ==
Big Ten field hockey programs have won 12 NCAA Championships, although only four of these titles were won by schools as Big Ten members. Maryland won eight national championships as a member of the ACC, second most in the sport all-time. Penn State also has two AIAW championships won before it became a Big Ten member and before the NCAA sponsored women's sports.

=== National championships, Final Fours, and NCAA tournament appearances ===
Seasons are listed by the calendar years in which they ended. Italics indicate seasons before the school competed in the Big Ten.

School	NCAA National Championships	NCAA Runner-ups	NCAA Final Fours	NCAA Quarterfinals	NCAA Tournament appearances	Conference Championships	Conference Tournament Championships
Indiana				**1** (2005)	**2** (2005, 2009)		
Iowa	**1** (1986)	**3** (1984, 1988, 1992)	**12** (1984, 1986–1990, 1992–1994, 1999, 2008, 2020)	**21** (1982–1996, 1999, 2008, 2019–2022)	**28** (1982–1996, 1999, 2004, 2006–2008, 2011, 2012, 2018–2023)	**16** (1981–1983, 1985–1987, 1989–1992, 1995, 1996, 1999, 2004, 2019, 2021)	**6** (1981, 1994, 2006, 2007, 2008, 2019)
Maryland	**8** (1987, 1993, 1999, 2005, 2006, 2008, 2010, 2011)	**5** (1995, 2001, 2009, 2017, 2018)	**21** (1987, 1991, 1993, 1995, 1999–2001, 2003–2006, 2008–2013, 2017, 2018, 2021, 2022)	**32** (1985, 1987, 1991–1993, 1995–2013, 2014, 2016–2019, 2021–2023)	**36** (1985, 1987, 1988, 1990–1993, 1995–2013, 2014–2019, 2021–2024)	**6** (2014–2016, 2018, 2019, 2022)	**12** (1992, 1998–2001, 2005, 2008, 2009, 2010, 2013, 2015, 2018)
Michigan	**1** (2001)	**2** (1999, 2020)	**5** (1999, 2001, 2003, 2017, 2020)	**13** (1999–2001, 2003–2005, 2007, 2011, 2015, 2017, 2018, 2020, 2021)	**20** (1999–2005, 2007, 2010–2012, 2015–2022, 2024)	**11** (1997, 2000, 2002–2004, 2007, 2010, 2011, 2017, 2018, 2020)	**9** (1999, 2000, 2004, 2005, 2010, 2017, 2020, 2022, 2024)
Michigan State			**2** (2002, 2004)	**7** (2001–2004, 2008, 2009, 2013)	**9** (2001–2004, 2007–2010, 2013)	**4** (2001, 2003, 2004, 2009)	**4** (2002, 2003, 2009, 2013)
Northwestern	**2** (2021, 2024)	**2** (2022, 2023)	**8** (1983, 1985, 1989, 1994, 2021–2024)	**17** (1983–1990, 1993, 1994, 2017, 2020–2024)	**20** (1983–1991, 1993, 1994, 2014, 2017, 2019–2024)	**8** (1983–1985, 1988, 1994, 2013, 2023, 2024)	**2** (2014, 2023)
Ohio State			**1** (2010)	**2** (2006, 2010)	**7** (1994, 2001, 2005, 2006, 2009–2011)	**3** (2001, 2006, 2010)	**1** (2001)
Penn State		**2** (2002, 2007)	**8** (1982, 1986, 1990, 1991, 1993, 2002, 2007, 2022)	**21** (1982, 1983, 1986, 1988, 1990, 1991–1995, 1997, 1998, 2002, 2003, 2006, 2007, 2011, 2012, 2014, 2017, 2022)	**35** (1982–1990, 1991–2000, 2002, 2003, 2005–2008, 2010–2014, 2016–2018, 2021, 2022)	**11** (1988–1990, 1993, 1997, 1998, 2005, 2008, 2012, 2013, 2022)	**9** (1989, 1990, 1995–1998, 2011, 2012, 2016)
Rutgers				**3** (1984, 1986, 2021)	**5** (1984, 1986, 2018, 2021, 2023)		**1** (2021)

=== NCAA field hockey champions, runners-up, and scores ===
Note: Teams in bold are current Big Ten members who advanced to the championship while in the conference. Teams in bold italics are current Big Ten members who were either in another conference or an independent at the time of their appearance.

Year	Champion	Runner-up	Score	Venue	
1984	Old Dominion	**Iowa**	5–1	Stagg Field	Springfield, Massachusetts
1986	**Iowa**	New Hampshire	2–1 (2OT)	Foreman Field	Norfolk, Virginia
1987	**Maryland**	North Carolina	2–1	Navy Field	Chapel Hill, North Carolina
1988	Old Dominion (4)	**Iowa**	2–1	Franklin Field	Philadelphia, Pennsylvania
1992	Old Dominion (7)	**Iowa**	4–0	Cary Street Field	Richmond, Virginia
1993	**Maryland** (2)	North Carolina	2–1 (SO)	Bauer Field	Piscataway, New Jersey
1995	North Carolina (2)	**Maryland**	5–1	Kentner Stadium	Winston-Salem, North Carolina
1999	**Maryland** (3)	**Michigan**	2–1	Parsons Field	Brookline, Massachusetts
2001	**Michigan**	**Maryland**	2–0	Dix Stadium	Kent, Ohio
2002	Wake Forest	**Penn State**	2–0	Trager Stadium	Louisville, Kentucky
2005	**Maryland** (4)	Duke	1–0	Trager Stadium	Louisville, Kentucky
2006	**Maryland** (5)	Wake Forest	1–0	Kentner Stadium	Winston-Salem, North Carolina
2007	North Carolina (5)	**Penn State**	3–0	Maryland Field Hockey & Lacrosse Complex	College Park, Maryland
2008	**Maryland** (6)	Wake Forest	4–2	Trager Stadium	Louisville, Kentucky
2009	North Carolina (6)	**Maryland**	3–2	Kentner Stadium	Winston-Salem, North Carolina
2010	**Maryland** (7)	North Carolina	3–2 (OT)	Maryland Field Hockey & Lacrosse Complex	College Park, Maryland
2011	**Maryland** (8)	North Carolina	3–2 (OT)	Trager Stadium	Louisville, Kentucky
2017	Connecticut (5)	**Maryland**	2–1	Trager Stadium	Louisville, Kentucky
2018	North Carolina (7)	**Maryland**	2–0	Trager Stadium	Louisville, Kentucky
2020	North Carolina (9)	**Michigan**	4–3	Karen Shelton Stadium	Chapel Hill, North Carolina
2020	**Northwestern**	Liberty	2–0	Phyllis Ocker Field	Ann Arbor, Michigan
2022	North Carolina (10)	**Northwestern**	2–1	George J. Sherman Family-Sports Complex	Storrs, Connecticut
2023	North Carolina (11)	**Northwestern**	2–1 (SO)	Karen Shelton Stadium	Chapel Hill, North Carolina
2024	**Northwestern** (2)	Saint Joseph's	5–0	Phyllis Ocker Field	Ann Arbor, Michigan

== Men's gymnastics ==
The Big Ten fields five of the remaining 15 NCAA men's gymnastics teams. The most successful program is Penn State, which has won 12 NCAA men's gymnastics championships.

=== NCAA championships and runners-up ===
Year	Champion	Runner-up	Host
1938	Chicago†	Illinois	Chicago
1939	Illinois	Army	Chicago
1940	Illinois	Navy/Temple	Chicago
1941	Illinois	Minnesota†††	Chicago
1942	Illinois	Penn State††	Navy
1948	Penn State††	Temple	Chicago
1949	Temple	Minnesota†††	California
1950	Illinois	Temple	Army
1951	Florida State	Illinois/Southern Cal	Michigan
1953	Penn State††	Illinois	Syracuse
1954	Penn State††	Illinois	Illinois
1955	Illinois	Penn State††	UCLA
1956	Illinois	Penn State††	North Carolina
1957	Penn State††	Illinois	Navy
1958	Michigan State†††/Illinois		Michigan State
1959	Penn State††	Illinois	California
1960	Penn State††	Southern Cal	Penn State
1961	Penn State††	Southern Illinois	Illinois
1963	Michigan	Southern Illinois	Pittsburgh
1965	Penn State††	Washington	Southern Illinois
1967	Southern Illinois	Michigan	Southern Illinois
1969	Iowa†††	Penn State††/Colorado State	Washington
1970	Michigan	Iowa State/New Mexico state	Temple
1973	Iowa State	Penn State††	Oregon
1976	Penn State††	LSU	Temple
1979	Nebraska††	Oklahoma	LSU
1980	Nebraska††	Iowa State	Nebraska
1981	Nebraska††	Oklahoma	Nebraska
1982	Nebraska††	UCLA	Nebraska
1983	Nebraska††	UCLA	Penn State
1984	UCLA	Penn State††	UCLA
1985	Ohio State	Nebraska††	Nebraska
1986	Arizona State	Nebraska††	Nebraska
1987	UCLA	Nebraska††	UCLA
1988	Nebraska††	Illinois	Nebraska
1989	Illinois	Nebraska††	Nebraska
1990	Nebraska††	Minnesota†††	Minnesota
1991	Oklahoma	Penn State††	Penn State
1992	Stanford	Nebraska††	Nebraska
1993	Stanford	Nebraska††	New Mexico
1994	Nebraska††	Stanford	Nebraska
1995	Stanford	Nebraska††	Ohio State
1996	Ohio State	California	Stanford
1998	California	Iowa†††	Penn State
1999	Michigan	Ohio State	Nebraska
2000	Penn State	Michigan	Iowa
2001	Ohio State	Oklahoma	Ohio State
2002	Oklahoma	Ohio State	Oklahoma
2003	Oklahoma	Ohio State	Temple
2004	Penn State	Oklahoma	Illinois
2005	Oklahoma	Ohio State	Army
2006	Oklahoma	Illinois	Oklahoma
2007	Penn State	Oklahoma	Penn State
2009	Stanford	Michigan	Minnesota
2010	Michigan	Stanford	Army
2012	Illinois	Oklahoma	Oklahoma
2013	Michigan	Oklahoma	Penn State
2014	Michigan	Oklahoma	Michigan
2017	Oklahoma	Ohio State	Army
2018	Oklahoma	Minnesota†††	UIC
2023	Stanford	Michigan	Penn State
2024	Stanford	Michigan	Ohio State
2025	Michigan	Stanford	Michigan

†–Chicago left the Big Ten in 1946.

††–Finishes prior to Penn State and Nebraska joining the Big Ten.

†††–Iowa, Michigan State and Minnesota no longer competes in men's gymnastics.

== Men's ice hockey ==
The Big Ten began sponsoring men's ice hockey in the 2013–14 season, the only Power Five conference to do so. The inaugural season included six schools: Michigan, Michigan State and Ohio State joined from the then disbanded (revived in the 2021–22 season) CCHA; Minnesota and Wisconsin joined from the WCHA (men's division disbanded after the 2020–21 season); and Penn State joined after playing its first NCAA Division I season (2012–13) as an independent. Notre Dame joined the league as an affiliate member beginning with the 2017–18 season. Arizona State had a scheduling agreement with the conference for the 2020–21 season as an all-away game team, playing all seven Big Ten squads four times, but was not part of the conference and therefore was ineligible for the conference tournament or associated NCAA tournament automatic berth. ASU joined the National Collegiate Hockey Conference effective in 2024–25.

=== Championships, Frozen Fours, and NCAA Tournament Appearances ===
School	NCAA Championships	NCAA Runner-Up	NCAA Frozen Fours	NCAA Tournament Appearances	Conference Championships	Conference Tournament Championships
Michigan	9 (1948, 1951–1953, 1955, 1956, 1964, 1996, 1998)	3 (1957, 1977, 2011)	28 (1948–1957, 1962, 1964, 1977, 1992, 1993, 1995–1998, 2001–2003, 2008, 2011, 2018, 2022–2024, 2026)	42 (1948–1957, 1962, 1964, 1977, 1991–2012, 2016, 2018, 2021–2024, 2026)	14 (1953, 1956, 1964, 1992, 1994, 1995, 1996, 1997, 2000, 2002, 2004, 2005, 2008, 2011)	11 (1994, 1996, 1997, 1999, 2002, 2003, 2005, 2008, 2010, 2016, 2022, 2023, 2026)
Michigan State	3 (1966, 1986, 2007)	2 (1959, 1987)	11 (1959, 1966, 1967, 1984, 1986, 1987, 1989, 1992, 1999, 2001, 2007)	29 (1959, 1966, 1967, 1982–1990, 1992, 1994–2002, 2004, 2006–2008, 2012, 2024, 2025)	16 (1966, 1967, 1982–1985, 1987, 1989, 1990, 1998, 2000, 2001, 2006, 2024–2026)	9 (1985, 1986, 1989, 1990, 1998, 1999, 2001, 2024, 2025)
Minnesota	5 (1974, 1976, 1979, 2002, 2003)	8 (1953, 1954, 1971, 1975, 1981, 1989, 2014, 2023)	23 (1953, 1954, 1961, 1971, 1974–1976, 1979, 1981, 1983, 1986–1989, 1994, 1995, 2002, 2003, 2005, 2012, 2014, 2022, 2023)	42 (1953, 1954, 1961, 1971, 1974–1976, 1979–1981, 1983, 1985–1997, 2001–2008, 2012–2015, 2017, 2021–2025)	21 (1953, 1954, 1970, 1975, 1981, 1983, 1988, 1989, 1992, 1997, 2006, 2007, 2012–2017, 2022, 2023, 2025)	16 (1961, 1971, 1974–1976, 1979–1981, 1993, 1994, 1996, 2003, 2004, 2007, 2015, 2021)
Notre Dame		2 (2008, 2018)	4 (2008, 2011, 2017, 2018)	13 (2004, 2007–2009, 2011, 2013, 2014, 2016–2019, 2021, 2022)	3 (2007, 2009, 2018)	5 (2007, 2009, 2013, 2018, 2019)
Ohio State			2 (1998, 2018)	11 (1998, 1999, 2003–2005, 2009, 2017–2019, 2023, 2025)	2 (1972, 2019)	2 (1972, 2004)
Penn State			1 (2025)	4 (2017, 2018, 2023, 2025)	1 (2020)	1 (2017)
Wisconsin	6 (1973, 1977, 1981, 1983, 1990, 2006)	2 (1982, 2010)	11 (1970, 1972, 1973, 1977, 1978, 1981–1983, 1990, 2006, 2010, 2026)	27 (1970, 1972, 1973, 1977, 1978, 1981–1983, 1988–1991, 1993–1995, 1998, 2000, 2001, 2004–2006, 2008, 2010, 2013, 2014, 2021, 2024)	4 (1977, 1990, 2000, 2021)	13 (1970, 1972, 1973, 1977, 1978, 1982, 1983, 1988, 1990, 1995, 1998, 2013, 2014)

=== Conference records ===
Team's records against conference opponents (as of the end of the 2018–19 season).

School	Michigan			Michigan State			Minnesota			Notre Dame			Ohio State			Penn State			Wisconsin			Total			
School	W	L	T	W	L	T	W	L	T	W	L	T	W	L	T	W	L	T	W	L	T	W	L	T	Win%
Michigan				165	135	24	128	143	16	79	59	5	83	44	14	15	12	0	75	61	13	544	456	72	.541
Michigan State	135	165	24				48	118	16	63	48	12	89	45	13	9	13	4	55	53	3	400	444	73	.476
Minnesota	143	128	16	118	48	16				30	20	3	29	7	4	15	12	0	170	96	23	502	309	63	.610
Notre Dame	61	78	5	48	63	12	20	30	3				35	37	10	8	4	2	23	41	8	193	254	40	.437
Ohio State	44	83	14	45	89	13	7	29	4	37	35	10				15	10	2	16	18	3	164	264	46	.395
Penn State	12	15	0	13	9	4	12	15	0	4	8	2	10	15	2				17	12	3	68	74	11	.480
Wisconsin	61	75	13	55	56	4	96	170	23	41	23	8	18	16	3	12	17	3				281	356	53	.446

Games where one or more of the programs was not a varsity team are not included.

=== Conference champions ===
Season	School	Conference record
2013–14	Minnesota	14–3–3–0
2014–15	Minnesota (2)	12–5–3–0
2015–16	Minnesota (3)	14–6–0–0
2016–17	Minnesota (4)	14–5–1–0
2017–18	Notre Dame	17–6–1–1
2018–19	Ohio State	13–7–4–3
2019–20	Penn State	12–8–4–1
2020–21	Wisconsin	17–6–1–0
2021–22	Minnesota (5)	17–6–1–2
2022–23	Minnesota (6)	19–4–2–1
2023–24	Michigan State	16–6–2–1
2024–25	Michigan State (2)	15–5–4–2
2024–25	Minnesota (7)	15–6–3–0
2025–26	Michigan State (3)	14–4–3–3

=== Big Ten Men's Ice Hockey Tournament champions ===
Year	Winning team	Coach	Losing team	Coach	Score	Location	Venue
2014	Wisconsin	Mike Eaves	Ohio State	Steve Rohlik	5–4 (OT)	Saint Paul, Minnesota	Xcel Energy Center
2015	Minnesota	Don Lucia	Michigan	Red Berenson	4–2	Detroit, Michigan	Joe Louis Arena
2016	Michigan	Red Berenson	Minnesota	Don Lucia	5–3	Saint Paul, Minnesota	Xcel Energy Center
2017	Penn State	Guy Gadowsky	Wisconsin	Tony Granato	2–1 (2OT)	Detroit, Michigan	Joe Louis Arena
2018	Notre Dame	Jeff Jackson	Ohio State	Steve Rohlik	3–2 (OT)	Notre Dame, Indiana	Compton Family Ice Arena
2019	Notre Dame (2)	Jeff Jackson	Penn State	Guy Gadowsky	3–2	Notre Dame, Indiana	Compton Family Ice Arena
2020	Canceled in progress due to COVID-19						
2021	Minnesota (2)	Bob Motzko	Wisconsin	Tony Granato	6–4	Notre Dame, Indiana	Compton Family Ice Arena
2022	Michigan (2)	Mel Pearson	Minnesota	Bob Motzko	4–3	Minneapolis, Minnesota	3M Arena at Mariucci
2023	Michigan (3)	Brandon Naurato	Minnesota	Bob Motzko	4–3	Minneapolis, Minnesota	3M Arena at Mariucci
2024	Michigan State	Adam Nightingale	Michigan	Brandon Naurato	5–4 (OT)	East Lansing, Michigan	Munn Ice Arena
2025	Michigan State (2)	Adam Nightingale	Ohio State	Steve Rohlik	4–3 (2OT)	East Lansing, Michigan	Munn Ice Arena
2026	Michigan (4)	Brandon Naurato	Ohio State	Steve Rohlik	7–3	Ann Arbor, Michigan	Yost Ice Arena

=== Big Ten NCAA tournament champions, runners-up and locations ===
Year	Winning team	Coach	Losing team	Coach	Score	Location	Finals venue
1948	Michigan	Vic Heyliger	Dartmouth	Eddie Jeremiah	8–4	Colorado Springs, Colorado	Broadmoor Ice Palace
1951	Michigan (2)	Vic Heyliger	Brown	Westcott Moulton	7–1	Colorado Springs, Colorado	Broadmoor Ice Palace
1952	Michigan (3)	Vic Heyliger	Colorado College	Cheddy Thompson	4–1	Colorado Springs, Colorado	Broadmoor Ice Palace
1953	Michigan (4)	Vic Heyliger	Minnesota	John Mariucci	7–3	Colorado Springs, Colorado	Broadmoor Ice Palace
1954	Rensselaer	Ned Harkness	Minnesota	John Mariucci	5–4 (OT)	Colorado Springs, Colorado	Broadmoor Ice Palace
1955	Michigan (5)	Vic Heyliger	Colorado College	Cheddy Thompson	5–3	Colorado Springs, Colorado	Broadmoor Ice Palace
1956	Michigan (6)	Vic Heyliger	Michigan Tech	Al Renfrew	7–5	Colorado Springs, Colorado	Broadmoor Ice Palace
1957	Colorado College (2)	Tom Bedecki	Michigan	Vic Heyliger	13–6	Colorado Springs, Colorado	Broadmoor Ice Palace
1959	North Dakota	Bob May	Michigan State	Amo Bessone	4–3 (OT)	Troy, New York	RPI Field House
1964	Michigan (7)	Al Renfrew	Denver	Murray Armstrong	6–3	Denver, Colorado	University of Denver Arena
1966	Michigan State	Amo Bessone	Clarkson	Len Ceglarski	6–1	Minneapolis, Minnesota	Williams Arena
1971	Boston University	Jack Kelley	Minnesota	Glen Sonmor	4–2	Syracuse, New York	Onondaga War Memorial
1973	Wisconsin	Bob Johnson	Denver (Note: Participation vacated due to major NCAA violations.)	Murray Armstrong	4–2	Boston, Massachusetts	Boston Garden
1974	Minnesota	Herb Brooks	Michigan Tech	John MacInnes	4–2	Boston, Massachusetts	Boston Garden
1975	Michigan Tech (3)	John MacInnes	Minnesota	Herb Brooks	6–1	St. Louis, Missouri	St. Louis Arena
1976	Minnesota (2)	Herb Brooks	Michigan Tech	John MacInnes	6–4	Denver, Colorado	University of Denver Arena
1977	Wisconsin (2)	Bob Johnson	Michigan	Dan Farrell	6–5 (OT)	Detroit, Michigan	Olympia Stadium
1979	Minnesota (3)	Herb Brooks	North Dakota	Gino Gasparini	4–3	Detroit, Michigan	Olympia Stadium
1981	Wisconsin (3)	Bob Johnson	Minnesota	Brad Buetow	6–3	Duluth, Minnesota	Duluth Entertainment Center
1982	North Dakota (4)	Gino Gasparini	Wisconsin	Bob Johnson	5–2	Providence, Rhode Island	Providence Civic Center
1983	Wisconsin (4)	Jeff Sauer	Harvard	Bill Cleary	6–2	Grand Forks, North Dakota	Ralph Engelstad Arena
1986	Michigan State (2)	Ron Mason	Harvard	Bill Cleary	6–5	Providence, Rhode Island	Providence Civic Center
1987	North Dakota (5)	Gino Gasparini	Michigan State	Ron Mason	5–3	Detroit, Michigan	Joe Louis Arena
1989	Harvard	Bill Cleary	Minnesota	Doug Woog	4–3 (OT)	Saint Paul, Minnesota	Saint Paul Civic Center
1990	Wisconsin (5)	Jeff Sauer	Colgate	Terry Slater	7–3	Detroit, Michigan	Joe Louis Arena
1992	Lake Superior State (2)	Jeff Jackson	Wisconsin^{1}	Jeff Sauer	5–3	Albany, New York	Knickerbocker Arena
1996	Michigan (8)	Red Berenson	Colorado College	Don Lucia	3–2 (OT)	Cincinnati, Ohio	Riverfront Coliseum
1998	Michigan (9)	Red Berenson	Boston College	Jerry York	3–2 (OT)	Boston, Massachusetts	FleetCenter
2002	Minnesota (4)	Don Lucia	Maine	Tim Whitehead	4–3 (OT)	Saint Paul, Minnesota	Xcel Energy Center
2003	Minnesota (5)	Don Lucia	New Hampshire	Dick Umile	5–1	Buffalo, New York	HSBC Arena
2006	Wisconsin (6)	Mike Eaves	Boston College	Jerry York	2–1	Milwaukee, Wisconsin	Bradley Center
2007	Michigan State (3)	Rick Comley	Boston College	Jerry York	3–1	St. Louis, Missouri	Scottrade Center
2008	Boston College (3)	Jerry York	Notre Dame	Jeff Jackson	4–1	Denver, Colorado	Pepsi Center
2010	Boston College (4)	Jerry York	Wisconsin	Mike Eaves	5–0	Detroit, Michigan	Ford Field
2011	Minnesota–Duluth	Scott Sandelin	Michigan	Red Berenson	3–2 (OT)	Saint Paul, Minnesota	Xcel Energy Center
2014	Union	Rick Bennett	Minnesota	Don Lucia	7–4	Philadelphia, Pennsylvania	Wells Fargo Center
2018	Minnesota–Duluth (2)	Scott Sandelin	Notre Dame	Jeff Jackson	2–1	Saint Paul, Minnesota	Xcel Energy Center
2023	Quinnipiac	Rand Pecknold	Minnesota	Bob Motzko	3–2 (OT)	Tampa, Florida	Amalie Arena
2026	Denver (11)	David Carle	Wisconsin	Mike Hastings	2–1	Las Vegas, Nevada	T-Mobile Arena

=== Awards ===
At the conclusion of each regular season schedule the coaches of each Big Ten team, as well as a media panel, vote which players they choose to be on the three All-Conference Teams: first team, second team and rookie team. Additionally they vote to award the 5 individual trophies to an eligible player at the same time. The Big Ten also awards a Tournament Most Outstanding Player which is voted on after the conclusion of the conference tournament. Each team also names one of their players to be honored for the conference Sportsmanship Award. All of the awards were created for the inaugural season (2013–14).

All-Big Ten Teams
Award	Inaugural Year
First Team	2013–14
Second Team	2013–14
Freshman Team	2013–14
All-Tournament Team	2013–14

Individual Awards
Award	Inaugural Year
Player of the Year	2013–14
Freshman of the Year	2013–14
Goaltender of the Year	2013–14
Coach of the Year	2013–14
Defensive Player of the Year	2013–14
Big Ten tournament Most Outstanding Player	2014

=== Outdoor ice hockey games ===
Outdoor game appearances by Big Ten men's ice hockey teams
Event			Home team	Score	Away team	Venue		Notes
Date	Event name	Photo	Home team	Score	Away team	Name	Location	Notes
December 27, 2013	2013 Great Lakes Invitational		Michigan	2–3 (OT)	Western Michigan	Comerica Park	Detroit, Michigan	Double header & GLI Semifinals; fifth outdoor game appearance of Michigan, third outdoor game appearance of Michigan State; the 2013 Great Lakes Invitational was held within the 2013 Hockeytown Winter Festival, which was held in conjunction with the 2014 NHL Winter Classic at Michigan Stadium. On other days at Comerica Park, it featured an AHL professional hockey game, and a OHL major junior game.
December 27, 2013	2013 Great Lakes Invitational		Michigan Tech	3–2 (SO)	Michigan State	Comerica Park	Detroit, Michigan	Double header & GLI Semifinals; fifth outdoor game appearance of Michigan, third outdoor game appearance of Michigan State; the 2013 Great Lakes Invitational was held within the 2013 Hockeytown Winter Festival, which was held in conjunction with the 2014 NHL Winter Classic at Michigan Stadium. On other days at Comerica Park, it featured an AHL professional hockey game, and a OHL major junior game.
December 28, 2013	2013 Great Lakes Invitational		Michigan	0–3	Michigan State	Comerica Park	Detroit, Michigan	Double header & GLI Third Place Game; sixth outdoor game appearance of Michigan, fourth outdoor game appearance of Michigan State; Western Michigan and Michigan Tech played for the GLI championship in the second game of the day
January 4, 2014	Frozen Fenway 2014		Boston College	4–3	Notre Dame	Fenway Park	Boston, Massachusetts	Notre Dame's second outdoor game appearance; part of a double-header. Frozen Fenway 2014 featured further matches on other days as well.
January 17, 2014	2014 OfficeMax Hockey City Classic		Minnesota	1–0	Ohio State	Huntington Bank Stadium	Minneapolis Minnesota	Ohio State's third outdoor game appearance; Minnesota's second outdoor game appearance; part of a double-header with a women's game (Minnesota vs. Minnesota State))
February 7, 2015	2015 OfficeMax Hockey City Classic		Michigan State	1–4	Michigan	Soldier Field	Chicago, Illinois	Michigan's seventh outdoor game appearance, Michigan State's fifth outdoor game appearance; part of a double-header
January 5, 2019	Let's Take This Outside		Notre Dame	2–4	Michigan	Notre Dame Stadium	Notre Dame, Indiana	Michigan's eighth outdoor game appearance, Notre Dame's third outdoor game appearance; held in conjunction with the 2019 Winter Classic at the same venue
February 18, 2023	Faceoff on the Lake		Ohio State	4–2	Michigan	Huntington Bank Field	Cleveland, Ohio	Michigan's ninth outdoor game appearance; Ohio State fourth outdoor game appearance
January 3, 2025	Frozen Confines		Ohio State	4–3	Michigan	Wrigley Field	Chicago, Illinois	Double header held in conjunction with the 2025 Winter Classic at the same venue; Michigan's tenth outdoor game appearance; Ohio State's fifth outdoor game appearance; Notre Dame's fourth outdoor game appearance; Penn State's first outdoor game appearance
January 3, 2025	Frozen Confines		Penn State	3–4 (SO)	Notre Dame	Wrigley Field	Chicago, Illinois	Double header held in conjunction with the 2025 Winter Classic at the same venue; Michigan's tenth outdoor game appearance; Ohio State's fifth outdoor game appearance; Notre Dame's fourth outdoor game appearance; Penn State's first outdoor game appearance
January 4, 2025	Frozen Confines		Wisconsin	3–4 (OT)	Michigan State	Wrigley Field	Chicago, Illinois	Double header with a women's game (Ohio vs. Wisconsin), held in conjunction with the 2025 Winter Classic at the same venue; Michigan State's sixth outdoor game appearance; Wisconsin's fourth outdoor game appearance
February 2, 2026			Penn State	4–5 (OT)	Michigan State	Beaver Stadium	University Park, Pennsylvania	Michigan State's seventh outdoor game appearance; Penn State's fourth outdoor game appearance
February 20, 2027	Frozen Tundra Faceoff		Wisconsin	TBD	Michigan	Lambeau Field	Green Bay, Wisconsin	Wisconsin's fifth and Michigan's eleventh outdoor game appearance

== Baseball ==
=== Championships, College World Series, and NCAA tournament appearances ===
Seasons are listed by the calendar years in which they ended. Italics indicate seasons before the school competed in the Big Ten.

School	NCAA Championships	NCAA Runner-Up	NCAA College World Series Appearances	NCAA Regional Champions	NCAA Tournament Appearances	Conference Championships	Conference Tournament Championships
Illinois				**1** (2015)	**13** (1947, 1948, 1962, 1963, 1989, 1990, 1998, 2000, 2011, 2013, 2015, 2019, 2024)	**31** (1900, 1903, 1904, 1906–1908, 1910, 1911, 1914–1916, 1921, 1922, 1927, 1931, 1934, 1937, 1940, 1947, 1948, 1952, 1953, 1962, 1963, 1989, 1990, 1998, 2005, 2011, 2015, 2024)	**4** (1989, 1990, 2000, 2011)
Indiana			**1** (2013)	**1** (2013)	**10** (1996, 2009, 2013–2015, 2017–2019, 2023, 2024)	**7** (1925, 1932, 1938, 1949, 2013, 2014, 2019)	**4** (1996, 2009, 2013, 2014)
Iowa			**1** (1972)		**6** (1972, 1975, 1990, 2015, 2017, 2023)	**8** (1927 1938, 1939, 1942, 1949, 1972, 1974, 1990)	**1** (2017)
Maryland				**2** (2014, 2015)	**9** (1965, 1970, 1971, 2014, 2015, 2017, 2021–2023)	**6** (1936, 1965, 1970, 1971, 2022, 2023)	**1** (2023)
Michigan	**2** (1953, 1962)	**1** (2019)	**8** (1953, 1962, 1978, 1980, 1981, 1983, 1984, 2019)	**7** (1978, 1980, 1981, 1983, 1984, 2007, 2019)	**26** (1953, 1961, 1962, 1975–1978, 1980, 1981, 1983–1989, 1999, 2005–2008, 2015, 2017, 2019, 2021, 2022)	**35** (1899, 1901, 1905, 1918–1920, 1923, 1924, 1926, 1928, 1929, 1936, 1941, 1942, 1944, 1945, 1948–1950, 1952, 1953, 1961, 1975, 1976, 1978, 1980, 1981, 1983, 1984, 1986, 1987, 1997, 2006–2008)	**10** (1981, 1983, 1984, 1986, 1987, 1999, 2006, 2008, 2015, 2022)
Michigan State			**1** (1954)		**5** (1954, 1971, 1978, 1979, 2012)	**9** (1888, 1889, 1893, 1894, 1902, 1954, 1971, 1979, 2011)	
Minnesota	**3** (1956, 1960, 1964)		**5** (1956, 1960, 1964, 1973, 1977)	**2** (1977, 2018)	**32** (1956, 1958–1960, 1964, 1968–1970, 1973, 1974, 1976, 1977, 1981, 1982, 1985, 1987, 1988, 1991–1994, 1998–2001, 2003, 2004, 2007, 2009, 2010, 2016, 2018)	**24** (1933, 1935, 1956, 1958–1960, 1964, 1968–1970, 1973, 1974, 1977, 1982, 1985, 1988, 1992, 2000, 2002–2004, 2010, 2016, 2018)	**9** (1982, 1985, 1988, 1992, 1998, 2001, 2004, 2010, 2018)
Nebraska			**3** (2001, 2002, 2005)	**4** (2000, 2001, 2002, 2005)	**19** (1979, 1980, 1985, 1999–2003, 2005–2008, 2014, 2016, 2017, 2019, 2021, 2024, 2025)	**8** (1929, 1948, 1950, 2001, 2003, 2005, 2017, 2021)	**6** (1999, 2000, 2001, 2005, 2024, 2025)
Northwestern					**1** (1957)	**2** (1940, 1957)	
Ohio State	**1** (1966)	**1** (1965)	**4** (1951, 1965, 1966, 1967)	**2** (1999, 2003)	**22** (1951, 1955, 1965–1967, 1982, 1991–1995, 1997, 1999, 2001–2003, 2005, 2007, 2009, 2016, 2018, 2019)	**15** (1917, 1924, 1943, 1951, 1955, 1965–1967, 1991, 1993–1995, 1999, 2001, 2009)	**10** (1991, 1994, 1995, 1997, 2002, 2003, 2005, 2007, 2016, 2019)
Oregon			**1** (1954)	**3** (2012, 2023, 2024)	**12** (1954, 1964, 2010, 2012–2015, 2021–2024, 2025)	**15** (1918, 1928, 1934, 1935, 1937, 1939, 1941–1943, 1946, 1953–1955, 1957, 2025)	**1** (2023)
Penn State		**1** (1957)	**5** (1952, 1957, 1959, 1963, 1973)	**1** (2000)	**17** (1952, 1955, 1956, 1957, 1958, 1959, 1962, 1963, 1967, 1970, 1971, 1972, 1973, 1974, 1975, 1976, 2000)	**1** (1996)	
Purdue					**3** (1987, 2012, 2018)	**2** (1909, 2012)	**1** (2012)
Rutgers			**1** (1950)		**15** (1950, 1966, 1968, 1970, 1986, 1988, 1990, 1991, 1993, 1998–2001, 2003, 2007)	**14** (1981, 1982, 1986–1993, 1998, 2000, 2003, 2007)	**9** (1981, 1986, 1988, 1990, 1991, 1993, 1998, 2000, 2007)
UCLA	**1** (2013)	**1** (2010)	**5** (1969, 1997, 2010, 2012, 2013)	**8** (1997, 2000, 2007, 2010, 2012, 2013, 2019, 2025)	**26** (1969, 1979, 1986, 1987, 1990, 1992, 1993, 1996, 1997, 1999, 2000, 2004, 2006–2008, 2010–2013, 2015, 2017–2019, 2021, 2022, 2025)	**11** (1944, 1969, 1976, 1979, 1986, 2000, 2011, 2012, 2015, 2019, 2025)	
USC	**12** (1948, 1958, 1961, 1963, 1968, 1970–1974, 1978, 1998)	**2** (1960, 1995)	**21** (1948, 1949, 1951, 1955, 1958, 1960, 1961, 1963, 1964, 1966, 1968, 1970–1974, 1978, 1995, 1998, 2000, 2001)	**8** (1978, 1995, 1998, 1999, 2000, 2001, 2002, 2005)	**38** (1948, 1949, 1951, 1954, 1955, 1958, 1960, 1961, 1963, 1964, 1966, 1968, 1970–1975, 1977, 1978, 1984, 1988–1991, 1993–2002, 2005, 2015, 2025)	**38** (1930, 1932, 1935, 1936, 1939, 1942, 1946–1949, 1951–1961, 1963, 1964, 1966, 1968, 1970–1975, 1977, 1978, 1991, 1995, 1996, 2001, 2002)	
Washington			**1** (2018*)	**1** (2018*)	**12** (1959, 1992, 1994, 1997, 1998, 2002–2004, 2014, 2016, 2018*, 2023)	**2** (1919, 1922)	**2** (1997, 1998)

=== Men's College World Series champions, runners-up, and scores ===
Note: Teams in bold are current Big Ten members who advanced to the MCWS while in the conference. Teams in bold italics are current Big Ten members who were either in another conference or an independent at the time of their appearance.

Year	Champion	Runner-up	Score(s)	Venue	
1948	**USC**	Yale	3–1, 3–8, 9–2	Hyames Field	Kalamazoo, Michigan
1953	**Michigan**	Texas	7–5	Rosenblatt Stadium	Omaha, Nebraska
1956	**Minnesota**	Arizona	4–10, 12–1	Rosenblatt Stadium	Omaha, Nebraska
1957	California (2)	**Penn State**	1–0	Rosenblatt Stadium	Omaha, Nebraska
1958	**USC** (2)	Missouri	7–0, 8–7 (12)	Rosenblatt Stadium	Omaha, Nebraska
1960	**Minnesota** (2)	**USC**	2–4 (11), 2–1 (10)	Rosenblatt Stadium	Omaha, Nebraska
1961	**USC** (3)	Oklahoma State	1–0	Rosenblatt Stadium	Omaha, Nebraska
1962	**Michigan**	Santa Clara	5–4 (15)	Rosenblatt Stadium	Omaha, Nebraska
1963	**USC** (4)	Arizona	6–4, 5–2	Rosenblatt Stadium	Omaha, Nebraska
1964	**Minnesota** (3)	Missouri	5–1	Rosenblatt Stadium	Omaha, Nebraska
1965	Arizona State	**Ohio State**	3–7, 2–1	Rosenblatt Stadium	Omaha, Nebraska
1966	**Ohio State**	Oklahoma State	8–2	Rosenblatt Stadium	Omaha, Nebraska
1968	**USC** (5)	Southern Illinois	4–3	Rosenblatt Stadium	Omaha, Nebraska
1970	**USC** (6)	Florida State	2–1 (15)	Rosenblatt Stadium	Omaha, Nebraska
1971	**USC** (7)	Southern Illinois	7–2	Rosenblatt Stadium	Omaha, Nebraska
1972	**USC** (8)	Arizona State	3–1, 1–0	Rosenblatt Stadium	Omaha, Nebraska
1973	**USC** (9)	Arizona State	4–3	Rosenblatt Stadium	Omaha, Nebraska
1974	**USC** (10)	Miami (FL)	7–3	Rosenblatt Stadium	Omaha, Nebraska
1978	**USC** (11)	Arizona State	10–3	Rosenblatt Stadium	Omaha, Nebraska
1995	Cal State Fullerton (3)	**USC**	11–5	Rosenblatt Stadium	Omaha, Nebraska
1998	**USC** (12)	Arizona State	21–14	Rosenblatt Stadium	Omaha, Nebraska
2010	South Carolina	**UCLA**	7–1, 2–1 (11)	Rosenblatt Stadium	Omaha, Nebraska
2013	**UCLA**	Mississippi State	3–1, 8–0	TD Ameritrade Park Omaha	Omaha, Nebraska
2019	Vanderbilt (2)	**Michigan**	4–7, 4–1, 8–2	TD Ameritrade Park Omaha	Omaha, Nebraska

== Softball ==
=== Championships, College World Series, and NCAA tournament appearances ===
Seasons are listed by the calendar years in which they ended. Italics indicate seasons before the school competed in the Big Ten.

School	AIAW/NCAA Championships	AIAW/NCAA Runner-Up	AIAW/NCAA College World Series Appearances	AIAW/NCAA Super Regional Appearances	AIAW/NCAA Tournament Appearances	Conference Championships	Conference Tournament Championships
Illinois					**8** (2003, 2004, 2009, 2010, 2016, 2017, 2019, 2022)		
Indiana			**4** (1979, 1980, 1983, 1986)		**10** (1983, 1985, 1986, 1994, 1996, 2006, 2011, 2023–2025)	**3** (1983, 1986, 1994)	
Iowa			**4** (1995, 1996, 1997, 2001)		**16** (1989, 1991, 1993, 1995–1998, 2000–2006, 2008, 2009)	**5** (1989, 1990, 1997, 2000, 2003)	**2** (2001, 2003)
Maryland					**4** (1999, 2010, 2011, 2012)		
Michigan	**1** (2005)	**1** (2015)	**13** (1982, 1995, 1996, 1997, 1998, 2001, 2002, 2004, 2005, 2009, 2013, 2015, 2016)	**11** (2005–2010, 2012–1016)	**31** (1992, 1993, 1995–2019, 2021, 2022, 2024, 2025)	**22** (1992, 1993, 1995, 1996, 1998, 1999, 2001, 2002, 2004, 2005, 2008–2016, 2018, 2019, 2021)	**12** (1995–1998, 2000, 2002, 2005, 2006, 2015, 2019, 2024, 2025)
Michigan State	**1** (1976)		**6** (1973–1977, 1981)		**4** (1997, 1999, 2003, 2004)		**1** (2004)
Minnesota			**3** (1976, 1978, 2019)	**2** (2014, 2019)	**17** (1988, 1991, 1996, 1998, 1999, 2002, 2003, 2013–2019, 2021–2023)	**4** (1986, 1988, 1991, 2017)	**5** (1999, 2014, 2016–2018)
Nebraska			**7** (1982, 1984, 1987, 1988, 1998, 2002, 2013)	**2** (2013, 2025)	**27** (1982, 1984, 1987, 1988, 1995–2007, 2009–2011, 2013–2016, 2022, 2023, 2025)	**10** (1982, 1984–1988, 1998, 2001, 2004, 2014)	**10** (1982, 1984–1988, 1998, 2000, 2004, 2022)
Northwestern		**1** (2006)	**6** (1984–1986, 2006, 2007, 2022)	**7** (2005–2008, 2019, 2022, 2023)	**23** (1984–1987, 2000, 2003–2009, 2012, 2014–2016, 2018, 2019, 2021–2025)	**10** (1982, 1984–1987, 2006, 2008, 2022–2024)	**3** (1982, 2008, 2023)
Ohio State			**1** (1982)		**14** (1982, 1990, 2002, 2004, 2006, 2007, 2009, 2010, 2016–2019, 2022, 2025)	**2** (1990, 2007)	**1** (2007)
Oregon			**8** (1976, 1980, 1989, 2012, 2014, 2015, 2017, 2018, 2025)	**11** (2010–2018, 2023, 2025)	**24** (1989, 1994, 1998, 1999, 2000, 2003–2005, 2007, 2008, 2010–2018, 2021–2024, 2025)	**6** (2013–2016, 2018, 2025)	
Penn State					**11** (1983, 1985, 2000, 2001, 2002, 2003, 2005, 2006, 2007, 2011, 2024)		**3** (1983, 1985, 1988)
Purdue					**2** (2008, 2009)		
Rutgers			**2** (1979, 1981)		**4** (1979, 1981, 1984, 1994)		
UCLA	**13** (1978, 1982, 1984, 1985, 1988–1990, 1992, 1999, 2003, 2004, 2010, 2019)	**8** (1979, 1987, 1991, 1993, 1997, 2000, 2001, 2005)	**36** (1978, 1979, 1981–1985, 1987–1994, 1996, 1997, 1999, 2000–2006, 2008, 2010, 2015–2019, 2021, 2022, 2024, 2025)	**15** (2005, 2006, 2008–2010, 2014–2019, 2021, 2022, 2024, 2025)	**43** (1978, 1979, 1981–1985, 1987–1994, 1996, 1997, 1999–2019, 2021–2024, 2025)	**18** (1975, 1976, 1983, 1984, 1987–1991, 1993, 1999, 2002, 2006, 2009, 2019, 2021, 2023, 2024)	**1** (2024)
Washington	**1** (2009)	**3** (1996, 1999, 2018)	**15** (1996–2000, 2003, 2004, 2007, 2009, 2010, 2013, 2017–2019, 2023)	**15** (2005–2007, 2009–2014, 2016–2019, 2021, 2023)	**31** (1994–2019, 2021–2024, 2025)	**4** (1996, 2000, 2010, 2019)	
Wisconsin					**9** (2001, 2002, 2005, 2013, 2014, 2017–2019, 2022)		**9** (2013)

=== Women's College World Series champions, runners-up, and scores ===
Note: Teams in bold are current Big Ten members who advanced to the WCWS while in the conference. Teams in bold italics are current Big Ten members who were either in another conference or an independent at the time of their appearance.

Year	Champion	Runner-up	Score(s)	Venue	
1982	**UCLA**	Fresno State	2–0 (8)	Seymour Smith Park	Omaha, Nebraska
1984	**UCLA** (2)	Texas A&M	1–0, 1–0 (13)	Seymour Smith Park	Omaha, Nebraska
1985	**UCLA** (3)	**Nebraska** (vacated)	2–1 (9)	Seymour Smith Park	Omaha, Nebraska
1987	Texas A&M (2)	**UCLA**	1–0, 4–1	Seymour Smith Park	Omaha, Nebraska
1988	**UCLA** (4)	Fresno State	1–2, 3–0	Twin Creeks Sports Complex	Sunnyvale, California
1989	**UCLA** (5)	Fresno State	1–0	Twin Creeks Sports Complex	Sunnyvale, California
1990	**UCLA** (6)	Fresno State	0–17, 2–0	ASA Hall of Fame Stadium	Oklahoma City, Oklahoma
1991	Arizona	**UCLA**	5–1	ASA Hall of Fame Stadium	Oklahoma City, Oklahoma
1992	**UCLA** (7)	Arizona	2–0	ASA Hall of Fame Stadium	Oklahoma City, Oklahoma
1993	Arizona (2)	**UCLA**	1–0	ASA Hall of Fame Stadium	Oklahoma City, Oklahoma
1996	Arizona (4)	**Washington**	6–4	ASA Hall of Fame Stadium	Oklahoma City, Oklahoma
1997	Arizona (5)	**UCLA**	10–2 (5)	ASA Hall of Fame Stadium	Oklahoma City, Oklahoma
1999	**UCLA** (8)	**Washington**	3–2	ASA Hall of Fame Stadium	Oklahoma City, Oklahoma
2000	Oklahoma	**UCLA**	3–1	ASA Hall of Fame Stadium	Oklahoma City, Oklahoma
2001	Arizona (6)	**UCLA**	1–0	ASA Hall of Fame Stadium	Oklahoma City, Oklahoma
2003	**UCLA** (9)	California	1–0 (9)	ASA Hall of Fame Stadium	Oklahoma City, Oklahoma
2004	**UCLA** (10)	California	3–1	ASA Hall of Fame Stadium	Oklahoma City, Oklahoma
2005	**Michigan**	**UCLA**	0–5, 5–2, 4–1	ASA Hall of Fame Stadium	Oklahoma City, Oklahoma
2006	Arizona (7)	**Northwestern**	8–0, 5–0	ASA Hall of Fame Stadium	Oklahoma City, Oklahoma
2009	**Washington**	Florida	8–0, 3–2	ASA Hall of Fame Stadium	Oklahoma City, Oklahoma
2010	**UCLA** (11)	Arizona	6–5, 15–9	ASA Hall of Fame Stadium	Oklahoma City, Oklahoma
2015	Florida (2)	**Michigan**	3–2, 0–1, 4–1	ASA Hall of Fame Stadium	Oklahoma City, Oklahoma
2018	Florida State	**Washington**	1–0, 8–3	ASA Hall of Fame Stadium	Oklahoma City, Oklahoma
2019	**UCLA** (12)	Oklahoma	16–3, 5–4	ASA Hall of Fame Stadium	Oklahoma City, Oklahoma

== Men's lacrosse ==
The Big Ten began sponsoring men's lacrosse in the 2015 season. The Big Ten lacrosse league includes Maryland, Michigan, Ohio State, Penn State, Rutgers, and Johns Hopkins, which joined the Big Ten conference as an affiliate member in 2014. The teams that compete in Big Ten men's lacrosse have combined to win 13 NCAA national championships.

The addition of Johns Hopkins and Maryland to the conference brought two historically successful programs and longtime rivals into the same league. Johns Hopkins and Maryland have combined for 58 NCAA men's lacrosse Final Four appearances, with each program having 29. The Johns Hopkins–Maryland rivalry, which began in 1895, features over 100 matchups, and is frequently cited by the media and the respective universities as one of the most prominent rivalries in men's lacrosse.

=== All-time school records ===
This list goes through the 2024 season.

#	Team	Overall record	Pct.
1	Maryland	893–290–4	.754
2	Johns Hopkins	1027–375–15	.730
3	Rutgers	656–536–14	.550
4	Ohio State	523–457–5	.534
5	Penn State	578–554–8	.511
6	Michigan	69–110	.385

=== Championships, Final Fours, and NCAA tournament appearances ===
School	Men's NCAA Championships	Men's NCAA Runner-Up	Men's NCAA Final Fours	Men's NCAA Quarterfinals	Men's NCAA Tournament Appearances	Conference Championships	Conference Tournament Championships
Johns Hopkins	**9** (1974, 1978–1980, 1984, 1985, 1987, 2005, 2007)	**9** (1972, 1973, 1977, 1981, 1982, 1983, 1989, 2003, 2008)	**29** (1972–1974, 1976–1987, 1989, 1992, 1993, 1995, 1996, 1999, 2000, 2002–2005, 2007, 2008, 2015)	**44** (1972–1989, 1991–2009, 2011, 2012, 2014, 2015, 2018, 2023, 2024)	**49** (1972–2012, 2014, 2015–2019, 2023, 2024)	**2** (2015, 2018)	**3** (2015, 2023, 2024)
Maryland	**4** (1973, 1975, 2017, 2022)	**14** (1971, 1974, 1976, 1979, 1995, 1997, 1998, 2011, 2012, 2015, 2016, 2021, 2024, 2025)	**30** (1971–1979, 1983, 1987, 1989, 1991, 1995, 1997, 1998, 2003, 2005, 2006, 2011, 2012, 2014, 2015–2018, 2021, 2022, 2024, 2025)	**42** (1971–1979, 1981–1983, 1986, 1987, 1989, 1991, 1992, 1995–1998, 2000, 2001, 2003–2006, 2008–2012, 2014, 2015–2022, 2024, 2025)	**47** (1971–1979, 1981–1983, 1986, 1987, 1989, 1991–1998, 2000, 2001, 2003–2014, 2015–2025)	**37** (1955–1961, 1963, 1965–1968, 1972–1974, 1976–1980, 1985, 1987, 1989, 1996, 1998, 2001, 2003, 2004, 2009, 2013, 2014, 2015–2018, 2021, 2022)	**8** (1998, 2004, 2005, 2011, 2016, 2017, 2021, 2022)
Michigan				**1** (2023)	**2** (2023, 2024)		**2** (2023, 2024)
Ohio State		**1** (2017)	**1** (2017)	**4** (2008, 2013, 2015, 2017)	**8** (2003, 2004, 2008, 2013, 2015, 2017, 2022, 2025)	**12** (1965, 1966, 1978, 1986, 1988, 1992*, 1999, 2003, 2004, 2008, 2014, 2025)	**1** (2013)
Penn State			**3** (2019, 2023, 2025)	**3** (2019, 2023, 2025)	**8** (2003, 2005, 2013, 2017, 2019, 2023–2025)	**4** (2005, 2013, 2019, 2023)	**1** (2019)
Rutgers			**1** (2022)	**8** (1972, 1974, 1975, 1984, 1986, 1990, 2021, 2022)	**11** (1972, 1974, 1975, 1984, 1986, 1990, 1991, 2003, 2004, 2021, 2022)		

=== Big Ten Conference champions ===
Season	School	Conference Record
2015	Maryland; Johns Hopkins	4–1; 4–1
2016	Maryland	5–0
2017	Maryland	4–1
2018	Maryland	4–1
2019	Penn State	5–0
2020	Season canceled and no champion crowned	
2021	Maryland	10–0
2022	Maryland	5–0
2023	Penn State; Johns Hopkins	4–1; 4–1
2024	Johns Hopkins	5–0
2025	Ohio State	4–1

=== Big Ten men's lacrosse tournament champions ===
Year	Winning team	Coach	Losing team	Coach	Score	Location	Venue
2015	Johns Hopkins	Dave Pietramala	Ohio State	Nick Myers	13–6	College Park, Maryland	Capital One Field at Maryland Stadium
2016	Maryland	John Tillman	Rutgers	Brian Brecht	14–8	Baltimore, Maryland	Homewood Field
2017	Maryland	John Tillman	Ohio State	Nick Myers	10–9	Columbus, Ohio	Jesse Owens Memorial Stadium
2018	Johns Hopkins	David Pietramala	Maryland	John Tillman	13–10	Ann Arbor, Michigan	U-M Lacrosse Stadium
2019	Penn State	Jeff Tambroni	Johns Hopkins	David Pietramala	18–17 (OT)	Piscataway, New Jersey	HighPoint.com Stadium
2020	Canceled due to the COVID-19 pandemic						
2021	Maryland	John Tillman	Johns Hopkins	Peter Milliman	12–10	University Park, Pennsylvania	Panzer Stadium
2022	Maryland	John Tillman	Rutgers	Brian Brecht	17–7	College Park, Maryland	Capital One Field at Byrd Stadium
2023	Michigan	Kevin Conry	Maryland	John Tillman	14–5	Baltimore, Maryland	Homewood Field
2024	Michigan	Kevin Conry	Penn State	Jeff Tambroni	16–4	Columbus, Ohio	Ohio State Lacrosse Stadium
2025	Ohio State	Nick Myers	Maryland	John Tillman	14–10	Ann Arbor, Michigan	U-M Lacrosse Stadium

=== NCAA Men's lacrosse champions, runners-up, and scores ===
Note: Teams in bold are current Big Ten members who advanced to the championship game while in the conference. Teams in bold italics are current Big Ten members who were either in another conference or an independent at the time of their appearance.

Year	Champion	Runner-up	Score(s)	Venue	
1971	Cornell	**Maryland**	12–6	Hofstra Stadium	Hempstead, New York
1972	Virginia	**Johns Hopkins**	13–12	Byrd Stadium	College Park, Maryland
1973	**Maryland**	**Johns Hopkins**	10–9 (OT)	Franklin Field	Philadelphia, Pennsylvania
1974	**Johns Hopkins**	**Maryland**	17–12	Rutgers Stadium	Piscataway, New Jersey
1975	**Maryland** (2)	Navy	20–13	Homewood Field	Baltimore, Maryland
1976	Cornell (2)	**Maryland**	16–13 (OT)	Brown Stadium	Providence, Rhode Island
1977	Cornell (3)	**Johns Hopkins**	16–8	Scott Stadium	Charlottesville, Virginia
1978	**Johns Hopkins** (2)	Cornell	13–8	Rutgers Stadium	Piscataway, New Jersey
1979	**Johns Hopkins** (3)	**Maryland**	15–9	Byrd Stadium	College Park, Maryland
1980	**Johns Hopkins** (4)	Virginia	9–8 (OT)	Schoellkopf Field	Ithaca, New York
1981	North Carolina	**Johns Hopkins**	14–13	Palmer Stadium	Princeton, New Jersey
1982	North Carolina (2)	**Johns Hopkins**	7–5	Scott Stadium	Charlottesville, Virginia
1983	Syracuse	**Johns Hopkins**	17–16	Rutgers Stadium	Piscataway, New Jersey
1984	**Johns Hopkins** (5)	Syracuse	13–10	Delaware Stadium	Newark, Delaware
1985	**Johns Hopkins** (6)	Syracuse	11–4	Brown Stadium	Providence, Rhode Island
1987	**Johns Hopkins** (7)	Cornell	11–10	Rutgers Stadium	Piscataway, New Jersey
1989	Syracuse (2)	**Johns Hopkins**	13–12	Byrd Stadium	College Park, Maryland
1995	Syracuse (5)	**Maryland**	13–9	Byrd Stadium	College Park, Maryland
1997	Princeton (4)	**Maryland**	19–7	Byrd Stadium	College Park, Maryland
1998	Princeton (5)	**Maryland**	15–5	Rutgers Stadium	Piscataway, New Jersey
2003	Virginia (3)	**Johns Hopkins**	9–7	M&T Bank Stadium	Baltimore, Maryland
2005	**Johns Hopkins** (8)	Duke	9–8	Lincoln Financial Field	Philadelphia, Pennsylvania
2007	**Johns Hopkins** (9)	Duke	12–11	M&T Bank Stadium	Baltimore, Maryland
2008	Syracuse (9)	**Johns Hopkins**	13–10	Gillette Stadium	Foxborough, Massachusetts
2011	Virginia (5)	**Maryland**	9–7	M&T Bank Stadium	Baltimore, Maryland
2012	Loyola (MD)	**Maryland**	9–3	Gillette Stadium	Foxborough, Massachusetts
2015	Denver	**Maryland**	10–5	Lincoln Financial Field	Philadelphia, Pennsylvania
2016	North Carolina (5)	**Maryland**	14–13 (OT)	Lincoln Financial Field	Philadelphia, Pennsylvania
2017	**Maryland** (3)	**Ohio State**	9–6	Gillette Stadium	Foxborough, Massachusetts
2021	Virginia (7)	**Maryland**	17–16	Rentschler Field	East Hartford, Connecticut
2022	**Maryland** (4)	Cornell	9–7	Gillette Stadium	Foxborough, Massachusetts
2024	Notre Dame (2)	**Maryland**	15–5	Lincoln Financial Field	Philadelphia, Pennsylvania
2025	Cornell (4)	**Maryland**	13–10	Gillette Stadium	Foxborough, Massachusetts

== Women's lacrosse ==
Women's lacrosse became a Big Ten-sponsored sport in the 2015 season. As of the most recent 2026 season, the Big Ten women's lacrosse league includes Johns Hopkins, Maryland, Michigan, Oregon, Northwestern, Ohio State, Penn State, Rutgers, and USC. Big Ten women's lacrosse programs have 24 of the 39 all-time NCAA championships, including 13 of the last 16. Maryland has earned one pre-NCAA national title and has won 14 NCAA national championships, including seven straight from 1995 to 2001 and most recently in 2019. Northwestern has claimed nine NCAA titles, including five straight from 2005 to 2009. Penn State has earned three pre-NCAA national titles and two NCAA titles in 1987 and 1989. Johns Hopkins became the seventh women's lacrosse program in the Big Ten as of July 1, 2016, with the roster increasing to nine with the 2024 arrival of Oregon and USC.

=== All-time school records ===
This list goes through the 2024 season.

#	Team	Overall record	Pct.
1	Maryland	788–163–3	.828
2	Northwestern	449–149	.751
3	USC	151–63	.706
4	Penn State	573–300–5	.655
5	Johns Hopkins	484–318–4	.603
6	Ohio State	239–226	.514
7	Michigan	90–92	.495
8	Oregon	163–176	.481
9	Rutgers	352–389–6	.475

=== Championships, Final Fours, and NCAA tournament appearances ===
School	Women's AIAW/NCAA Championships	Women's AIAW/NCAA Runner-Up	Women's AIAW/NCAA Final Fours	Women's AIAW/NCAA Quarterfinals	Women's AIAW/NCAA Tournament Appearances	Conference Championships	Conference Tournament Championships
Johns Hopkins			**1** (2026)	**2** (2007, 2026)	**14** (2004, 2005, 2007, 2014–2016, 2018, 2019, 2021–2026)		
Maryland	**15** (1981, 1986, 1992, 1995–2001, 2010, 2014, 2015, 2017, 2019)	**10** (1978, 1982, 1984, 1985, 1990, 1991, 1994, 2011, 2013, 2016)	**29** (1984–1986, 1990–2001, 2003, 2009–2014, 2015–2019, 2022, 2026)	**37** (1983–1987, 1989–2004, 2007–2014, 2015–2019, 2022, 2024, 2026)	**46** (1978–1987, 1990–2014, 2015–2019, 2021–2026)	**22** (1997, 1999, 2001, 2003, 2007–2014, 2015–2019, 2022)	**15** (1997, 1999–2001, 2003, 2009–2014, 2016–2018, 2022)
Michigan				**1** (2024)	**6** (2019, 2022–2026)		
Northwestern	**9** (2005–2009, 2011, 2012, 2023, 2026)	**3** (2010, 2024, 2025)	**17** (2005–2014, 2019, 2021–2026)	**21** (1984, 2004–2014, 2015, 2018, 2019, 2021–2026)	**27** (1983, 1984, 1986–1988, 2004–2014, 2015–2019, 2021–2026)	**13** (2004–2010, 2013, 2021, 2023–2026)	**11** (2007–2011, 2013, 2019, 2021, 2023, 2024, 2026)
Ohio State				**1** (2003)	**4** (2002, 2003, 2014, 2015)	**1** (2003)	
Oregon						**1** (2012)	**1** (2012)
Penn State	**2** (1987, 1989)	**2** (1986, 1988)	**11** (1983, 1985–1989, 1991, 1995, 1999, 2016, 2017)	**20** (1983–1993, 1995–1997, 1999, 2012, 2013, 2015 2016, 2017)	**29** (1981–1993, 1995–1997, 1999, 2001, 2005, 2012–2014, 2015–2018, 2023, 2024, 2026)	**1** (2013)	**1** (2015)
Rutgers					**5** (1999, 2021, 2022, 2025, 2026)		
USC				**2** (2016, 2017)	**6** (2015–2017, 2019, 2022, 2023)	**4** (2016, 2017, 2019, 2023)	**4** (2016, 2017, 2019, 2023)

=== Big Ten Conference champions ===
Season	School	Conference Record
2015	Maryland	5–0
2016	Maryland	5–0
2017	Maryland	6–0
2018	Maryland	6–0
2019	Maryland	6–0
2020	Season canceled and no champion crowned	
2021	Northwestern	11–0
2022	Maryland	6–0
2023	Northwestern	6–0
2024	Northwestern	5–1
2025	Northwestern	8–0
2026	Northwestern	7–1

=== Big Ten women's lacrosse tournament champions ===
Year	Winning team	Coach	Losing team	Coach	Score	Location	Venue
2015	Penn State	Missy Doherty	Ohio State	Alexis Venechanos	13–11	Piscataway, New Jersey	High Point Solutions Stadium
2016	Maryland	Cathy Reese	Northwestern	Kelly Amonte Hiller	12–9	Evanston, Illinois	Lanny and Sharon Martin Stadium
2017	Maryland	Cathy Reese	Northwestern	Kelly Amonte Hiller	14–6	College Park, Maryland	Field Hockey & Lacrosse Complex
2018	Maryland	Cathy Reese	Penn State	Missy Doherty	21–12	Ann Arbor, Michigan	Michigan Stadium
2019	Northwestern	Kelly Amonte Hiller	Maryland	Cathy Reese	16–11	Baltimore, Maryland	Homewood Field
2020	Canceled due to the COVID-19 pandemic						
2021	Northwestern	Kelly Amonte Hiller	Maryland	Cathy Reese	17–12	University Park, Pennsylvania	Panzer Stadium
2022	Maryland	Cathy Reese	Rutgers	Melissa Lehman	18–8	Piscataway, New Jersey	SHI Stadium
2023	Northwestern	Kelly Amonte Hiller	Maryland	Cathy Reese	14–9	Columbus, Ohio	Ohio State Lacrosse Stadium
2024	Northwestern	Kelly Amonte Hiller	Penn State	Missy Doherty	14–12	Evanston, Illinois	Lanny and Sharon Martin Stadium
2025	Northwestern	Kelly Amonte Hiller	Maryland	Cathy Reese	8–7	College Park, Maryland	Field Hockey & Lacrosse Complex
2026	Northwestern	Kelly Amonte Hiller	Maryland	Cathy Reese	8–7 (OT)	Ann Arbor, Michigan	U-M Lacrosse Stadium

=== NCAA Women's lacrosse champions, runners-up, and scores ===
Note: Teams in bold are current Big Ten members who advanced to the championship game while in the conference. Teams in bold italics are current Big Ten members who were either in another conference or an independent at the time of their appearance.

Year	Champion	Runner-up	Score(s)	Venue	
1984	Temple	**Maryland**	6–4	Nickerson Field	Boston, Massachusetts
1985	New Hampshire	**Maryland**	6–5	Franklin Field	Philadelphia, Pennsylvania
1986	**Maryland**	**Penn State**	6–5	Byrd Stadium	College Park, Maryland
1987	**Penn State**	Temple	7–6	Byrd Stadium	College Park, Maryland
1988	Temple (2)	**Penn State**	15–7	Walton Field	Haverford, Pennsylvania
1989	**Penn State** (2)	Harvard	7–6	John A. Farrell Stadium	West Chester, Pennsylvania
1990	Harvard	**Maryland**	8–7	Palmer Stadium	Princeton, New Jersey
1991	Virginia	**Maryland**	8–6	Lions Stadium	Trenton, New Jersey
1992	**Maryland** (2)	Harvard	11–10 (OT)	Goodman Stadium	Bethlehem, Pennsylvania
1994	Princeton	**Maryland**	10–7	Byrd Stadium	College Park, Maryland
1995	**Maryland** (3)	Princeton	13–5	Lions Stadium	Trenton, New Jersey
1996	**Maryland** (4)	Virginia	10–5	Goodman Stadium	Bethlehem, Pennsylvania
1997	**Maryland** (5)	Loyola (MD)	8–7	Goodman Stadium	Bethlehem, Pennsylvania
1998	**Maryland** (6)	Virginia	11–5	UMBC Stadium	Catonsville, Maryland
1999	**Maryland** (7)	Virginia	16–6	Homewood Field	Baltimore, Maryland
2000	**Maryland** (8)	Princeton	16–8	Lions Stadium	Trenton, New Jersey
2001	**Maryland** (9)	Georgetown	14–13 (3OT)	Homewood Field	Baltimore, Maryland
2005	**Northwestern**	Virginia	13–10	Navy–Marine Corps Memorial Stadium	Annapolis, Maryland
2006	**Northwestern** (2)	Dartmouth	7–4	Nickerson Field	Boston, Massachusetts
2007	**Northwestern** (3)	Virginia	15–13	Franklin Field	Philadelphia, Pennsylvania
2008	**Northwestern** (4)	Penn	10–6	Johnny Unitas Stadium	Towson, Maryland
2009	**Northwestern** (5)	North Carolina	21–7	Johnny Unitas Stadium	Towson, Maryland
2010	**Maryland** (10)	**Northwestern**	13–11	Johnny Unitas Stadium	Towson, Maryland
2011	**Northwestern** (6)	**Maryland**	8–7	Kenneth P. LaValle Stadium	Stony Brook, New York
2012	**Northwestern** (7)	Syracuse	8–6	Kenneth P. LaValle Stadium	Stony Brook, New York
2013	North Carolina	**Maryland**	13–12 (3OT)	Villanova Stadium	Villanova, Pennsylvania
2014	**Maryland** (11)	Syracuse	15–12	Johnny Unitas Stadium	Towson, Maryland
2015	**Maryland** (12)	North Carolina	9–8	PPL Park	Chester, Pennsylvania
2016	North Carolina (2)	**Maryland**	13–7	Talen Energy Stadium	Chester, Pennsylvania
2017	**Maryland** (13)	Boston College	16–13	Gillette Stadium	Foxborough, Massachusetts
2019	**Maryland** (14)	Boston College	12–10	Homewood Field	Baltimore, Maryland
2023	**Northwestern** (8)	Boston College	18–6	WakeMed Soccer Park	Cary, North Carolina
2024	Boston College (2)	**Northwestern**	14–13	WakeMed Soccer Park	Cary, North Carolina
2025	North Carolina (4)	**Northwestern**	12–8	Gillette Stadium	Foxborough, Massachusetts
2026	**Northwestern** (9)	North Carolina	14–11	Martin Stadium	Evanston, Illinois

== Men's soccer ==
As of the upcoming 2026 season, the Big Ten men's soccer league includes Indiana, Maryland, Michigan, Michigan State, Northwestern, Ohio State, Penn State, Rutgers, UCLA, Washington, and Wisconsin. Big Ten men's soccer programs have combined to win 20 NCAA national championships.

=== All-time school records ===
This list goes through the 2013–14 season.

#	Team	Total seasons	Overall record
1	Indiana	41	677–162–76
2	Maryland	67	681–316–91
3	Michigan	14	141–115–26
4	Michigan State	58	540–295–92
5	Northwestern	34	268–370–87
6	Ohio State	61	406–439–104
7	Penn State	103	776–359–121
8	Rutgers	41	541–391–108
9	Wisconsin	37	381–271–74

=== Championships, College Cups, and NCAA tournament appearances ===
School	Men's NCAA Championships	Men's NCAA Runner-Up	Men's NCAA College Cups	Men's NCAA Quarterfinals	Men's NCAA Tournament Appearances	Conference Championships	Conference Tournament Championships
Indiana	**8** (1982, 1983, 1988, 1998, 1999, 2003, 2004, 2012)	**9** (1976, 1978, 1980, 1984, 1994, 2001, 2017, 2020, 2022)	**22** (1976, 1978, 1980, 1982–1984, 1988, 1989, 1991, 1994, 1997–2001, 2003, 2004, 2012, 2017, 2018, 2020, 2022)	**29** (1976, 1978–1984, 1988–1992, 1994, 1996–2001, 2003, 2004, 2008, 2012, 2017, 2018, 2020, 2022, 2023)	**50** (1974, 1976–1985, 1987–2025)	**19** (1993, 1994, 1996–2004, 2006, 2007, 2010, 2018–2020, 2023, 2024)	**16** (1991, 1992, 1994–1999, 2001, 2003, 2006, 2013, 2018–2020, 2023)
Maryland	**4** (1968, 2005, 2008, 2018)	**3** (1960, 1962, 2013)	**14** (1960, 1962, 1963, 1968, 1969, 1998, 2002–2005, 2008, 2012, 2013, 2018)	**20** (1959–1963, 1968, 1969, 1998, 2002–2005, 2008–2010, 2012, 2013, 2015, 2018, 2025)	**42** (1959–1964, 1967–1970, 1976, 1986, 1994–1999, 2001–2013, 2014–2022, 2024, 2025)	**26** (1949–1951, 1953–1968, 1971, 2012, 2013, 2014, 2016, 2022, 2025)	**9** (1996, 2002, 2008, 2010, 2012, 2013, 2014–2016)
Michigan			**1** (2010)	**2** (2003, 2010)	**9** (2003, 2004, 2008, 2010, 2012, 2017–2019, 2024)	**1** (2017)	**1** (2010)
Michigan State	**2** (1967, 1968)	**2** (1964, 1965)	**7** (1962, 1964–1968, 2018)	**10** (1962, 1964–1968, 2013, 2014, 2017, 2018)	**21** (1962–1969, 2001, 2004, 2007–2010, 2012–2014, 2016–2018, 2025)	**2** (2004, 2008)	**3** (2004, 2008, 2012)
Northwestern				**2** (2006, 2008)	**9** (2004, 2006–2009, 2011–2014)	**1** (2011, 2012)	**1** (2011)
Ohio State		**1** (2007)	**2** (2007, 2024)	**2** (2007, 2024)	**12** (2000, 2001, 2004, 2005, 2007–2010, 2014, 2015, 2022, 2024)	**4** (2004, 2009, 2015, 2024)	**4** (2000, 2007, 2009, 2024)
Penn State			**1** (1979)	**7** (1971, 1979, 1980, 1985, 1986, 1999, 2002)	**35** (1970–1982, 1984–1986, 1988, 1989, 1992–1995, 1998, 1999, 2001, 2002, 2004, 2005, 2009, 2010, 2013, 2014, 2019–2021)	**9** (1987–1989, 1995, 2005, 2012, 2013, 2021, 2023)	**7** (1987–1989, 1993, 2002, 2005, 2021)
Rutgers		**1** (1990)	**4** (1961, 1989, 1990, 1994)	**4** (1960, 1961, 1987, 1989, 1990, 1994)	**18** (1960, 1961, 1983, 1987, 1989–1991, 1993, 1994, 1996, 1997, 1999, 2001, 2003, 2006, 2011, 2015, 2022)		**6** (1990, 1991, 1993, 1994, 1997, 2022)
UCLA	**4** (1985, 1990, 1997, 2002)	**5** (1970, 1972, 1973, 2006, 2014)	**14** (1970, 1972–1974, 1984, 1985, 1990, 1994, 1997, 1999, 2002, 2006, 2011, 2014)	**21** (1970, 1972–1974, 1984, 1985, 1987, 1989–1992, 1994, 1997, 1999, 2002, 2003, 2006, 2009–2011, 2014)	**44** (1954, 1956, 1958–1961, 1963, 1964, 1967, 1968, 1970, 1972–1975, 1977–1980, 1982, 1984, 1985, 1989, 1992–1999, 2003, 2005, 2008, 2010–2012, 2014–2016, 2018, 2021, 2024, 2025)	**39** (1954, 1956, 1958–1961, 1963, 1964, 1967, 1968, 1970, 1972–1975, 1977, 1979, 1980, 1982, 1984, 1985, 1989, 1992–1999, 2003, 2005, 2008, 2010–2012, 2014, 2015, 2023)	**1** (2025)
Washington	**1** (2025)	**1** (2021)	**2** (2021, 2025)	**5** (2013, 2019, 2020, 2021, 2025)	**30** (1968, 1972, 1973, 1976, 1978, 1982, 1989, 1992, 1995–2001, 2003, 2004, 2006, 2007, 2012–2014, 2016–2021, 2024, 2025)	**15** (1968, 1972, 1973, 1976, 1982, 1983, 1985, 1987, 1992, 1998–2000, 2013, 2019, 2020)	
Wisconsin	**1** (1995)		**1** (1995)	**2** (1993, 1995)	**7** (1981, 1991, 1993–1995, 2013, 2017)	**3** (1991, 1992, 1995)	**2** (1995, 2017)

=== NCAA Men's soccer champions, runners-up, and scores ===
Note: Teams in bold are current Big Ten members who advanced to the championship game while in the conference. Teams in bold italics are current Big Ten members who were either in another conference or an independent at the time of their appearance.

Year	Champion	Runner-up	Score	Venue	
1960	Saint Louis (2)	**Maryland**	3–2	Brooklyn College Field	Brooklyn, New York
1962	Saint Louis (3)	**Maryland**	4–3	Francis Field	St. Louis, Missouri
1964	Navy	**Michigan State**	1–0	Brown Stadium	Providence, Rhode Island
1965	Saint Louis (5)	**Michigan State**	1–0	Francis Field	St. Louis, Missouri
1967	**Michigan State**; Saint Louis (6)		0–0	Francis Field	St. Louis, Missouri
1968	**Maryland**; **Michigan State** (2)		2–2	Grant Field	Atlanta, Georgia
1970	Saint Louis (8)	**UCLA**	1–0	Cougar Field	Edwardsville, Illinois
1972	Saint Louis (9)	**UCLA**	4–2	Orange Bowl	Miami, Florida
1973	Saint Louis (10)	**UCLA**	3–2 (OT)	Orange Bowl	Miami, Florida
1976	San Francisco (3)	**Indiana**	1–0	Franklin Field	Philadelphia, Pennsylvania
1978	San Francisco (vacated)	**Indiana**	2–0	Tampa Stadium	Tampa, Florida
1980	San Francisco (4)	**Indiana**	4–3 (OT)	Tampa Stadium	Tampa, Florida
1982	**Indiana**	Duke	2–1 (OT)	Lockhart Stadium	Fort Lauderdale, Florida
1983	**Indiana** (2)	Columbia	1–0 (OT)	Lockhart Stadium	Fort Lauderdale, Florida
1984	Clemson	**Indiana**	2–1	Kingdome	Seattle, Washington
1985	**UCLA**	American	1–0 (OT)	Kingdome	Seattle, Washington
1988	**Indiana** (3)	Howard	1–0	Bill Armstrong Stadium	Bloomington, Indiana
1990	**UCLA** (2)	**Rutgers**	0–0 (OT) (4–3 P)	USF Soccer Stadium	Tampa, Florida
1994	Virginia (5)	**Indiana**	1–0	Richardson Stadium	Davidson, North Carolina
1995	**Wisconsin**	Duke	2–0	Richmond Stadium	Richmond, Virginia
1997	**UCLA** (3)	Virginia	2–0	Richmond Stadium	Richmond, Virginia
1998	**Indiana** (4)	Stanford	3–1	Richmond Stadium	Richmond, Virginia
1999	**Indiana** (5)	Santa Clara	1–0	Ericsson Stadium	Charlotte, North Carolina
2001	North Carolina	**Indiana**	2–0	Columbus Crew Stadium	Columbus, Ohio
2002	**UCLA** (4)	Stanford	1–0	Gerald J. Ford Stadium	Dallas, Texas
2003	**Indiana** (6)	St. John's	2–1	Columbus Crew Stadium	Columbus, Ohio
2004	**Indiana** (7)	UC Santa Barbara	1–1 (OT) (3–2 P)	Home Depot Center	Carson, California
2005	**Maryland** (2)	New Mexico	1–0	SAS Soccer Park	Cary, North Carolina
2006	UC Santa Barbara	**UCLA**	2–1	Hermann Stadium	St. Louis, Missouri
2007	Wake Forest	**Ohio State**	2–1	SAS Soccer Park	Cary, North Carolina
2008	**Maryland** (3)	North Carolina	1–0	Pizza Hut Park	Frisco, Texas
2012	**Indiana** (8)	Georgetown	1–0	Regions Park	Hoover, Alabama
2013	Notre Dame	**Maryland**	2–1	PPL Park	Chester, Pennsylvania
2014	Virginia (7)	**UCLA**	0–0 (OT) (4–2 P)	WakeMed Soccer Park	Cary, North Carolina
2017	Stanford (3)	**Indiana**	1–0	Regions Park	Hoover, Alabama
2018	**Maryland** (4)	Akron	1–0	Harder Stadium	Santa Barbara, California
2020	Marshall	**Indiana**	1–0 (OT)	WakeMed Soccer Park	Cary, North Carolina
2021	Clemson (3)	**Washington**	2–0	WakeMed Soccer Park	Cary, North Carolina
2022	Syracuse	**Indiana**	2–2 (OT) (7–6 P)	WakeMed Soccer Park	Cary, North Carolina
2025	**Washington**	NC State	3–2 (OT)	WakeMed Soccer Park	Cary, North Carolina

== Women's soccer ==
=== Championships, College Cups, and NCAA tournament appearances ===
School	Women's NCAA Championships	Women's NCAA Runner-Up	Women's NCAA College Cups	Women's NCAA Quarterfinals	Women's NCAA Tournament Appearances	Conference Championships	Conference Tournament Championships
Illinois				**1** (2004)	**13** (2000, 2001, 2003–2008, 2010–2013, 2025)		**2** (2003, 2011)
Indiana					**5** (1996, 1998, 2007, 2013, 2023)	**1** (1996)	**1** (1996)
Iowa					**6** (2013, 2019, 2020, 2023–2025)		**3** (2020, 2023)
Maryland				**2** (1995, 1996)	**13** (1995, 1996, 1997, 1998, 1999, 2001, 2002, 2003, 2004, 2009, 2010, 2011, 2012)		
Michigan				**3** (2002, 2013, 2021)	**16** (1997–2004, 2006, 2010, 2012, 2013, 2016, 2019, 2021, 2023)		**3** (1997, 1999, 2021)
Michigan State					**8** (2002, 2005, 2008, 2009, 2022–2025)	**2** (2022, 2023)	
Minnesota					**12** (1995–1999, 2008, 2010, 2013, 2015, 2016, 2018, 2024)	**4** (1995, 1997, 2008, 2016)	**3** (1995, 2016, 2018)
Nebraska				**3** (1996, 1999, 2023)	**13** (1996–2005, 2013, 2016, 2023)	**5** (1996, 1999, 2000, 2013, 2023)	**6** (1996, 1998–2000, 2002, 2013)
Northwestern					**8** (1996, 1998, 2015–2018, 2022, 2025)	**1** (2016)	
Ohio State			**1** (2010)	**2** (2004, 2010)	**13** (2002–2004, 2007, 2009–2013, 2015–2018, 2020–2025)	**2** (2010, 2017)	**3** (2002, 2004, 2012)
Oregon							
Penn State	**1** (2015)	**1** (2012)	**5** (1999, 2002, 2005, 2012, 2015)	**15** (1998–2003, 2005, 2006, 2012, 2014, 2015, 2017, 2018, 2023, 2024)	**31** (1995–2025)	**20** (1998–2012, 2014–2016, 2018, 2020)	**9** (1998, 2000, 2001, 2006, 2008, 2015, 2017, 2019, 2022)
Purdue					**7** (2002, 2003, 2005–2007, 2009, 2021)		**1** (2007)
Rutgers			**2** (2015, 2021)	**2** (2015, 2021)	**19** (1987, 2001, 2003, 2006, 2008, 2009, 2012, 2013, 2014–2024)	**1** (2021)	
UCLA	**2** (2013, 2022)	**4** (2000, 2004, 2005, 2017)	**12** (2000, 2003–2009, 2013, 2017, 2019, 2022)	**17** (1997, 2000, 2001, 2003–2009, 2012–2014, 2017–2019, 2022)	**29** (1995, 1997–2014, 2016–2023, 2024, 2025)	**14** (1997, 1998, 2001, 2003–2008, 2013, 2014, 2020, 2021, 2023)	**1** (2024)
USC	**2** (2007, 2016)		**2** (2007, 2016)	**4** (2007, 2016, 2019, 2024)	**20** (1998–2003, 2005–2010, 2014–2023 2024)	**2** (1998, 2024)	
Washington				**2** (2004, 2010)	**18** (1994–1996, 1998, 2000, 2001, 2003, 2004, 2008–2010, 2012, 2014, 2015, 2019, 2020, 2024, 2025)	**2** (2000, 2025)	**1** (2025)
Wisconsin		**1** (1991)	**2** (1988, 1991)	**4** (1988, 1990, 1991, 1993)	**25** (1988–1991, 1993–1996, 1998, 2000, 2002, 2004, 2005, 2009, 2010, 2012, 2014, 2016–2019, 2021, 2023–2025)	**3** (1994, 2015, 2019)	**3** (1994, 2005, 2014)

=== NCAA Women's soccer champions, runners-up, and scores ===
Note: Teams in bold are current Big Ten members who advanced to the championship game while in the conference. Teams in bold italics are current Big Ten members who were either in another conference or an independent at the time of their appearance.

Year	Champion	Runner-up	Score	Venue	
1991	North Carolina (9)	**Wisconsin**	3–1	Fetzer Field	Chapel Hill, North Carolina
2000	North Carolina (16)	**UCLA**	2–1	Spartan Stadium	San Jose, California
2004	Notre Dame (2)	**UCLA**	1–1 (OT) (4–3 P)	SAS Soccer Park	Cary, North Carolina
2005	Portland (2)	**UCLA**	4–0	Aggie Soccer Stadium	College Station, Texas
2007	**USC**	Florida State	2–0	Aggie Soccer Stadium	College Station, Texas
2012	North Carolina (21)	**Penn State**	4–1	Torero Stadium	San Diego, California
2013	**UCLA**	Florida State	1–0 (OT)	WakeMed Soccer Park	Cary, North Carolina
2015	**Penn State**	Duke	1–0	WakeMed Soccer Park	Cary, North Carolina
2016	**USC** (2)	West Virginia	3–1	Avaya Stadium	San Jose, California
2017	Stanford (2)	**UCLA**	3–2	Orlando City Stadium	Orlando, Florida
2022	**UCLA** (2)	North Carolina	3–2 (OT)	WakeMed Soccer Park	Cary, North Carolina

== Golf ==
Every Big Ten institution sponsors both men's and women's golf. Five national championships in men's golf and two national titles in women's golf have been won by Big Ten members while in the conference, led by both of Michigan and Ohio State's men's teams that have won two national titles each. In addition, 10 more team national titles, 3 in men's golf and 7 in women's golf, have been won by current Big Ten members before they joined the conference, led by UCLA (2 men's, 3 women's).

National Championships
School	Men's Team NCAA	Men's Individual NCAA	Women's Team NCAA	Women's Individual NCAA
Illinois		Scott Langley 2010, Thomas Pieters 2012		
Indiana				
Iowa				
Maryland				
Michigan	1934, 1935	Johnny Fischer 1932, Charles Kocsis 1936, Dave Barclay 1947		
Michigan State				
Minnesota	2002	Louis Lick 1944, James McLean 1998		
Nebraska				
Northwestern		Luke Donald 1999	2025	
Ohio State	1945, 1979	John Lorms 1945, Tom Nieporte 1951, Rick Jones 1956, Jack Nicklaus 1961, Clark Burroughs 1985		
Oregon	2016	Aaron Wise 2016		
Penn State				
Purdue	1961	Fred Wampler 1950, Joe Campbell 1955	2010	María Hernández 2009
Rutgers				
UCLA	1988, 2008	Kevin Chappell 2008	1991, 2004, 2011	
USC		Scott Simpson 1976, 1977, Ron Commans 1981, Jamie Lovemark 2007	2003, 2008, 2013	Jennifer Rosales 1998, Mikaela Parmlid 2003, Dewi Schreefel 2006, Annie Park 2013, Doris Chen 2014
Washington		James Lepp 2005	2016	
Wisconsin				

- Italics denote championships won before the school joined the Big Ten.

== Tennis ==
Of the current Big Ten members, 14 sponsor both men's and women's tennis, with Iowa, Maryland, Minnesota and Rutgers only sponsoring women's tennis. Two national championships in men's tennis have been won by Big Ten members while in the conference, led by Illinois and Michigan with one title each. In addition, 41 more team national titles, 37 in men's tennis and 4 in women's tennis, have been won by current Big Ten members before they joined the conference, led by USC (21 men's, 2 women's).

National Championships
School	Men's Team NCAA	Men's Individual NCAA	Men's Doubles NCAA	Women's Team NCAA	Women's Individual NCAA	Women's Doubles NCAA
Illinois	2003	Amer Delić 2003	Cary Franklin / Graydon Oliver 2000, Rajeev Ram / Brian Wilson 2003, Kevin Anderson / Ryan Rowe 2006			
Indiana						
Iowa						
Maryland						
Michigan	1957	Barry MacKay 1957, Mike Leach 1982			Brienne Minor 2017	
Michigan State						
Minnesota						
Nebraska						
Northwestern						Katrina Adams / Diane Donnelly 1987, Cristelle Grier / Alexis Prousis 2006
Ohio State		Blaž Rola 2013	Chase Buchanan / Blaž Rola 2012, Andrew Lutschaunig / James Trotter 2023, Robert Cash / JJ Tracy 2024			Francesca Di Lorenzo / Miho Kowase 2017
Oregon						
Penn State						
Purdue						
Rutgers						
UCLA	1950, 1952, 1953, 1954, 1956, 1960, 1961, 1965, 1970, 1971, 1975, 1976, 1979, 1982, 1984, 2005	Herbert Flam 1950, Larry Nagler 1960, Allen Fox 1961, Arthur Ashe 1965, Charlie Pasarell 1966, Jeff Borowiak 1970, Jimmy Connors 1971, Billy Martin 1975, Benjamin Kohllöffel 2006, Marcos Giron 2014, Mackenzie McDonald 2016	Herbert Flam / Gene Garrett 1950, Robert Perry / Lawrence Huebner 1953, Robert Perry / Ronald Livingston 1954, Larry Nagler / Allen Fox 1960, Ian Crookenden / Arthur Ashe 1965, Ian Crookenden / Charlie Pasarell 1966, Haroon Rahim / Jeff Borowiak 1971, Peter Fleming / Ferdi Taygan 1976, John Austin / Bruce Nichols 1978, Patrick Galbraith / Brian Garrow 1988, Justin Gimelstob / Srđan Muškatirović 1996, Mackenzie McDonald / Martin Redlicki 2016, Martin Redlicki / Evan Zhu 2018, Maxime Cressy / Keegan Smith 2019	2008, 2014	Keri Phebus 1995, Tian Fangran 2023	Heather Ludloff / Lynn Lewis 1982, Allison Cooper / Stella Sampras 1988, Mamie Ceniza / Iwalani McCalla 1992, Keri Phebus / Susie Starrett 1995, Daniela Bercek /Lauren Fisher 2004, Tracy Lin / Riza Zalameda 2008, Gabrielle Andrews / Ayan Broomfield 2019
USC	1946, 1951, 1955, 1958, 1962, 1963, 1964, 1966, 1967, 1968, 1969, 1976, 1991, 1993, 1994, 2002, 2009, 2010, 2011, 2012, 2014	Bob Falkenburg 1946, Hugh Stewart 1952, Alex Olmedo 1956, 1958, Rafael Osuna 1962, Dennis Ralston 1963, 1964, Bob Lutz 1967, Stan Smith 1968, Joaquín Loyo-Mayo 1969, Robert Van't Hof 1980, Cecil Mamiit 1996, Steve Johnson 2011, 2012	Bob Falkenburg / Tom Falkenberg 1946, Earl Cochell / Hugh Stewart 1951, Francisco Contreras / Joaquín Reyes 1955, Alex Olmedo / Francisco Contreras 1956, Alex Olmedo / Edward Atkinson 1958, Rafael Osuna / Ramsey Earnhart 1961, 1962, Rafael Osuna / Dennis Ralston 1963, Dennis Ralston / William Bond 1964, Stan Smith / Bob Lutz 1967, 1968, Joaquín Loyo-Mayo / Marcello Lara 1969, Butch Walts / Bruce Manson 1975, Bruce Manson / Chris Lewis 1977, Rick Leach / Tim Pawsat 1986, Rick Leach / Scott Melville 1987, Eric Amend / Byron Black 1989, Robert Farah / Kaes Van't Hof 2008	1983, 1985	Beth Herr 1983	Kaitlyn Christian / Sabrina Santamaria 2013
Washington			James Brink / Fred Fisher 1949			
Wisconsin						

- Italics denote championships won before the school joined the Big Ten.

== Awards and honors ==
=== Big Ten Athlete of the Year ===
The Big Ten Athlete of the Year award is given annually to the athletes voted as the top male and female athlete in the Big Ten Conference.

=== Big Ten Medal of Honor ===
Big Ten Medal of Honor (annual; at each school; one male scholar-athlete and one female scholar-athlete)

- Big Ten Sportsmanship Award (annual; at each school; one male student-athlete and one female student-athlete)

=== NACDA Learfield Sports Directors' Cup rankings ===
The NACDA Learfield Sports Directors' Cup is an annual award given by the National Association of Collegiate Directors of Athletics to the U.S. colleges and universities with the most success in collegiate athletics. Big Ten universities typically finish ranked in the top-50 of the final Directors' Cup annual rankings.

Institution	2023– 24	2022– 23	2021– 22	2020– 21	2019– 20	2018– 19	2017– 18	2016– 17	2015– 16	2014– 15	10-yr Average
Illinois Fighting Illini	37	54	52	47	N/A	43	36	38	54	31	44
Indiana Hoosiers	41	40	64	34	N/A	32	52	47	41	61	46
Iowa Hawkeyes	64	48	55	30	N/A	38	51	52	62	44	49
Maryland Terrapins	61	44	46	46	N/A	40	50	49	59	33	48
Michigan Wolverines	8	11	3	3	N/A	2	5	4	3	19	6
Michigan State Spartans	42	53	41	61	N/A	47	48	50	53	34	48
Minnesota Golden Gophers	40	31	28	28	N/A	20	19	30	18	26	27
Nebraska Cornhuskers	22	29	49	35	N/A	48	31	38	27	39	35
Northwestern Wildcats	39	30	36	31	N/A	45	31	36	50	50	39
Ohio State Buckeyes	15	3	4	9	N/A	12	6	2	2	7	7
Oregon Ducks	28	38	31	25	N/A	27	24	8	10	13	23
Penn State Nittany Lions	23	15	43	39	N/A	13	10	7	20	8	20
Purdue Boilermakers	65	72	53	38	N/A	55	41	41	45	60	52
Rutgers Scarlet Knights	66	130	48	60	N/A	82	103	113	83	104	88
UCLA Bruins	10	14	15	13	N/A	6	2	9	6	2	9
USC Trojans	14	10	12	6	N/A	5	4	3	4	3	7
Washington Huskies	26	21	30	33	N/A	24	29	20	14	24	25
Wisconsin Badgers	25	27	24	37	N/A	16	22	16	27	18	24

University	Top 10 rankings
UCLA	24
Michigan	23
USC	19
Ohio State	15
Penn State	9
Nebraska	5
Oregon	2
Washington	2
Minnesota	1

=== 2025–26 Capital One Cup standings ===
The Capital One Cup is an award given annually to the best men's and women's Division I college athletics programs in the United States. Points are earned throughout the year based on final standings of NCAA Championships and final coaches' poll rankings.

Institution	Men's Ranking	Women's Ranking
Illinois	34	48
Indiana	4	73
Iowa	65	43
Maryland	51	32
Michigan	1	36
Michigan State	75	43
Minnesota	98	43
Nebraska	39	7
Northwestern	NR	4
Ohio State	28	24
Oregon	12	24
Penn State	20	53
Purdue	51	57
Rutgers	NR	NR
UCLA	14	3
USC	42	11
Washington	6	36
Wisconsin	51	21

== Conference records ==
For Big Ten records, by sport (not including football), see footnote

== NCAA national titles ==
Totals are per NCAA annual list published every July and NCAA-published gymnastics history, with subsequent results as of April 18, 2026, obtained from NCAA.org, which provides intermittent updates throughout the year.

Excluded from this list are all national championships earned outside the scope of NCAA competition, including Division I FBS football titles, women's AIAW championships (34), men's rowing (27), and retroactive Helms Athletic Foundation titles.

Institution	Total	Men's	Women's	Co-ed	Nickname	Most successful sport (Titles)
UCLA	127	80	47	0	Bruins	Men's volleyball (21)
USC	115	87	28	0	Trojans	Men's outdoor track and field (27)
Penn State	57	32	12	13	Nittany Lions	Fencing (14)
Michigan	37	34	3	0	Wolverines	Men's swimming (12)
Oregon	35	20	15	0	Ducks	Women's indoor track & field (8)
Wisconsin	34	22	12	0	Badgers	Women's ice hockey (9)
Maryland	32	9	23	0	Terrapins	Women's lacrosse (14)
Ohio State	32	24	5	3	Buckeyes	Men's swimming (11)
Iowa	26	25	1	0	Hawkeyes	Men's wrestling (24)
Indiana	24	24	0	0	Hoosiers	Men's soccer (8)
Nebraska	21	8	13	0	Cornhuskers	Men's gymnastics (8)
Michigan State	20	19	1	0	Spartans	Men's cross country (8)
Minnesota	19	13	6	0	Golden Gophers	Women's ice hockey (6)
Illinois	18	18	0	0	Fighting Illini	Men's gymnastics (10)
Northwestern	13	1	12	0	Wildcats	Women's lacrosse (8)
Washington	10	1	9	0	Huskies	Rowing (5)
Purdue	3	1	2	0	Boilermakers	Men's golf (1), Women's golf (1), Women's basketball (1)
Rutgers	1	1	0	0	Scarlet Knights	Fencing (1)
Total	624	419	189	16		

See also: List of NCAA schools with the most NCAA Division I championships and List of NCAA schools with the most Division I national championships

== Conference titles ==
For Big Ten championships, by year, see footnote. Totals do not include Big Ten tournament championships. This list goes through the 2025–26 season.

Institution	# of
Chicago^{7}	73
Illinois	256
Indiana	190
Johns Hopkins^{1}	3
Iowa	120
Maryland^{2}	30
Michigan	425
Michigan State	117
Minnesota	183
Nebraska^{3}	23
Northwestern	88
Notre Dame^{4}	1
Ohio State	264
Oregon	8
Penn State^{5}	103
Purdue	70
Rutgers^{6}	2
USC	3
UCLA	3
Washington	1
Wisconsin	214

1. Johns Hopkins was added in 2014 as an affiliate member that competed in men's lacrosse only. Johns Hopkins also began competing as an affiliate member in women's lacrosse in the 2016–17 school year.
2. Maryland won 196 conference championships as a member of the Atlantic Coast Conference (ACC), second most in ACC history.
3. Nebraska won 80 conference championships as a member of the Big 12 Conference, second most in Big 12 history. Nebraska also won 230 conference championships as a member of the Big Eight Conference, the most in Big Eight history.
4. Notre Dame was added in 2017 as an affiliate member that competed in men's ice hockey only.
5. Penn State won or shared 70 conference championships as a member of the Atlantic 10 Conference (1982–1991) and earlier when it was known as the Eastern 8 Conference (1976–1979).
6. Rutgers won six conference championships as a member of the Middle Three Conference, the Middle Atlantic Conference, the Atlantic 10 Conference, the original Big East Conference, and both of its offshoots, the non-football Big East Conference and the American Conference.
7. Chicago won 73 conference championships as a member of the Big Ten from 1896 to 1946.

== 2025–26 champions ==
- (RS) indicates regular-season champion
- (T) indicates tournament champion
- ‡ denotes national champion

Season	Sport	Men's champion		Women's champion	
Fall 2025	Cross country	Oregon		Oregon	
Fall 2025	Field hockey	–		Northwestern‡ (RS & T)	
Fall 2025	Football	Indiana‡		–	
Fall 2025	Soccer	Maryland (RS)	UCLA (T)	Washington (RS & T)	
Fall 2025	Volleyball	–		Nebraska	
Winter 2025–26	Basketball	Michigan‡ (RS)	Purdue (T)	UCLA‡ (RS & T)	
Winter 2025–26	Gymnastics	Michigan (RS & T)		UCLA (RS & T)	
Winter 2025–26	Ice Hockey	Michigan State (RS)	Michigan (T)	–	
Winter 2025–26	Swimming and diving	Indiana		Michigan	
Winter 2025–26	Track and field (indoor)	Oregon		Oregon	
Winter 2025–26	Wrestling	Penn State‡ (RS & T)		–	
Spring 2026	Baseball	UCLA (RS & T)		–	
Spring 2026	Golf	UCLA		USC	
Spring 2026	Lacrosse	Johns Hopkins, Maryland, Ohio State & Penn State (RS)	Penn State (T)	Northwestern‡ (RS & T)	
Spring 2026	Rowing	–		Washington	
Spring 2026	Softball	–		Nebraska (RS & T)	
Spring 2026	Tennis	Michigan State & Ohio State (RS)	Michigan State (T)	Ohio State, USC & Michigan (RS)	Michigan (T)
Spring 2026	Track and field (outdoor)	Oregon		Oregon	

== See also ==
- List of Big Ten National Championships
- Big Ten Universities
- Midwest Universities Consortium for International Activities
