= List of NCAA Division I lacrosse programs =

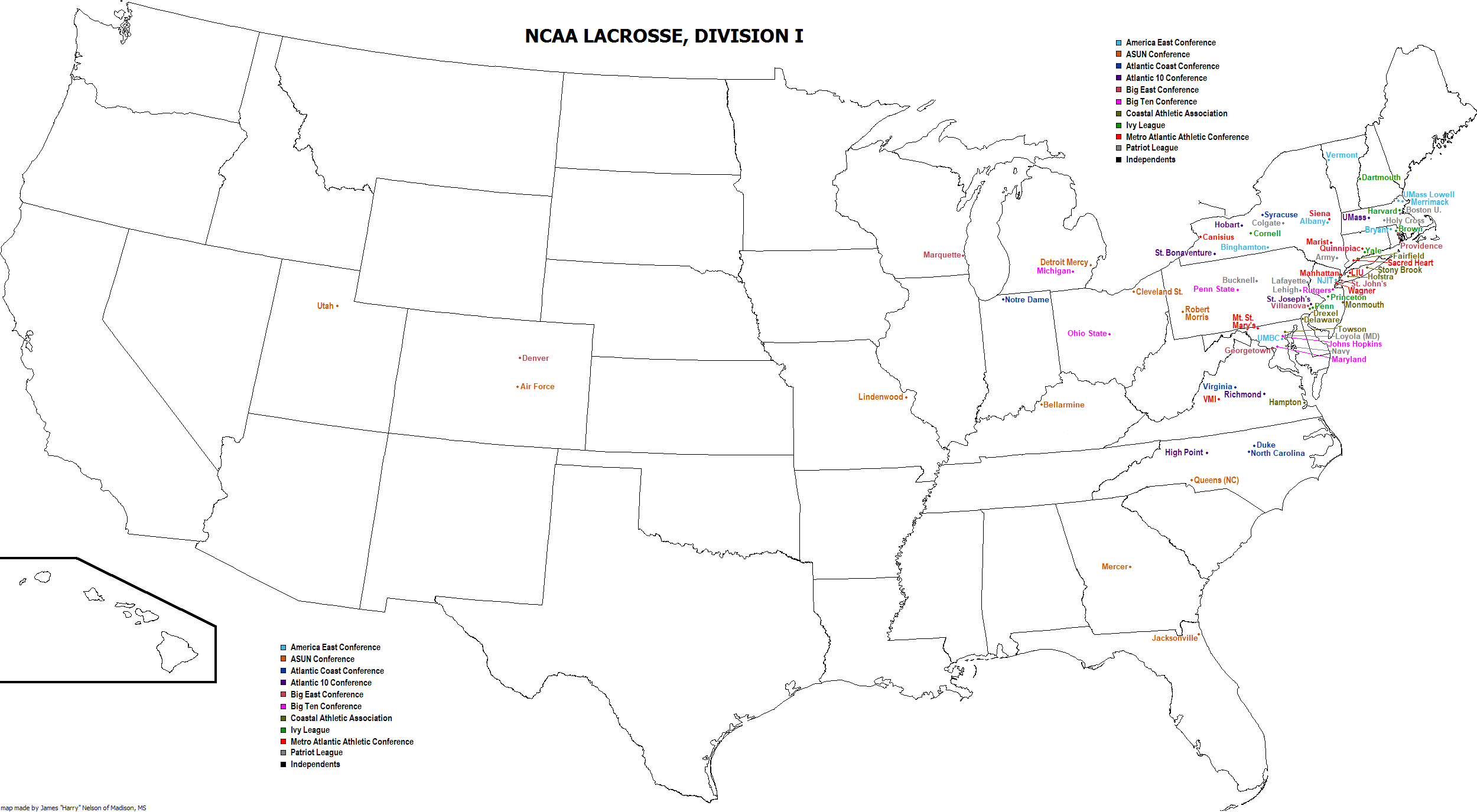
A map of NCAA Division I men's lacrosse teams

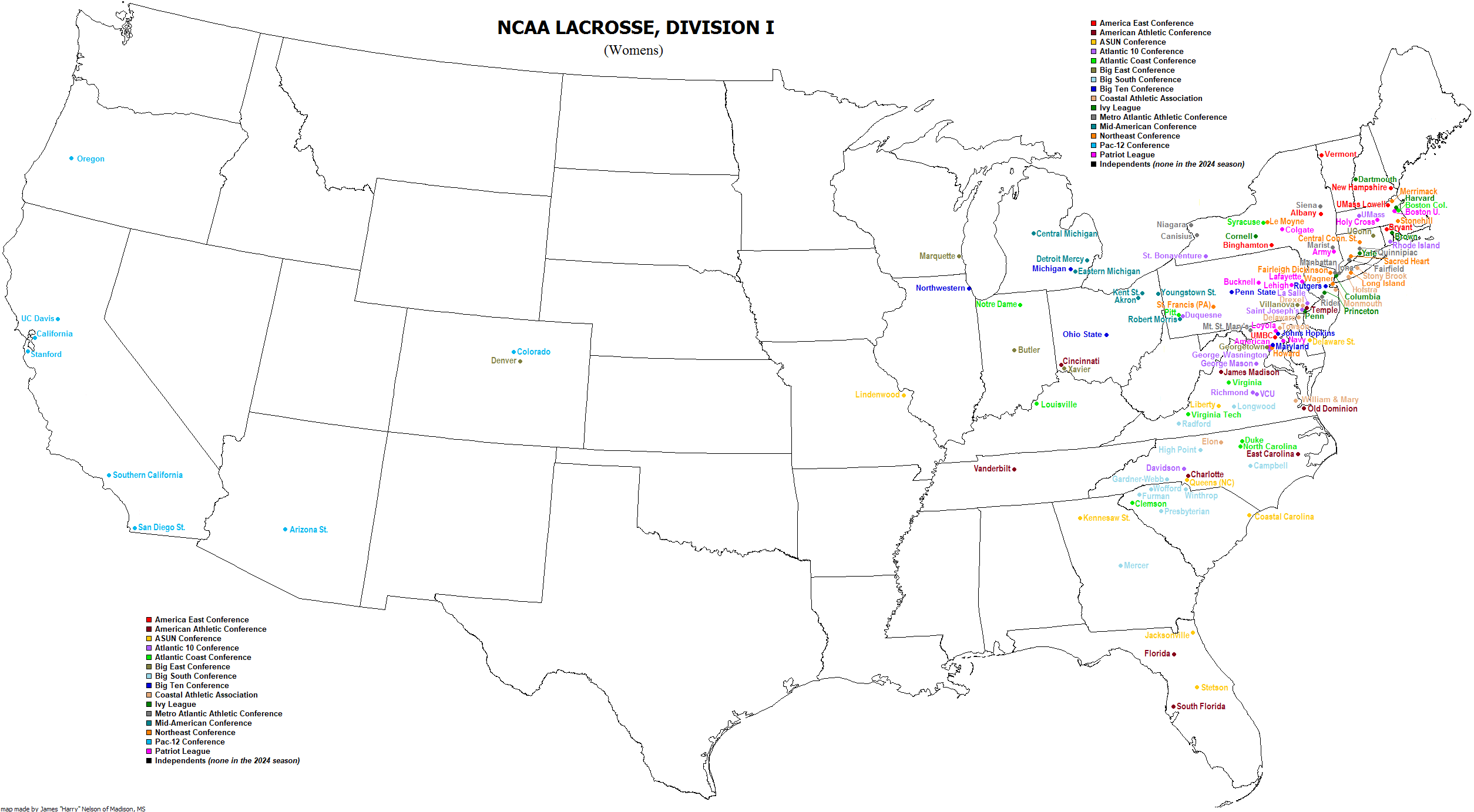
A map of NCAA Division I women's lacrosse teams

The following is a list of the 78 schools that field men's lacrosse teams and the 134 schools that field women's lacrosse teams in NCAA Division I competition.

Conference affiliations are current for the 2027 NCAA lacrosse season.

Future conference moves noted in this page reflect lacrosse seasons, which take place in the calendar year after a conference change takes effect.

== Men ==
| School | Team | City | State | Conference | Primary conference | First played (Note: Years listed reflect lacrosse seasons, not school years. NCAA lacrosse for both sexes is a spring sport.) | NCAA Tournament appearances | NCAA national championships | Pre-NCAA national championships |
|---|---|---|---|---|---|---|---|---|---|
| United States Air Force Academy (Air Force) | Falcons | USAF Academy (Note: Virtually all of the Academy grounds are outside the city limits of Colorado Springs. The U.S. Census Bureau considers the Academy to be the census-designated place of "Air Force Academy", and the U.S. Postal Service treats it as "USAF Academy".) | Colorado | Atlantic Sun Conference | Mountain West Conference | 1967 | (6) 1971, 1988, 2014, 2016, 2017, 2025 | (0) | (0) |
| University at Albany (Albany) | Great Danes | Albany | New York | America East Conference | | 1970 (Div. I in 2000) | (12) 2003, 2004, 2005, 2007, 2013, 2014, 2015, 2016, 2017, 2018, 2024, 2025 | (0) | (0) |
| United States Military Academy (Army) | Black Knights | West Point | New York | Patriot League | | 1907 | (18) 1971, 1972, 1973, 1978, 1981, 1982, 1983, 1984, 1985, 1987, 1993, 1996, 2003, 2004, 2005, 2010, 2019, 2023 | (0) | (8) 1923, 1944, 1945, 1951, 1958, 1959, 1961, 1969 |
| Bellarmine University | Knights | Louisville | Kentucky | Atlantic Sun Conference | | 2004 | (0) | (0) | (0) |
| Binghamton University | Bearcats | Binghamton (Note: The university has a Binghamton mailing address, but most of the campus, including all athletic facilities, lies in the adjacent town of Vestal.) | New York | America East Conference | | 2002 | (0) | (0) | (0) |
| Boston University | Terriers | Boston | Massachusetts | Patriot League | | 2014 | (1) 2022 | (0) | (0) |
| Brown University | Bears | Providence | Rhode Island | Ivy League | | 1926 | (15) 1971, 1973, 1976, 1985, 1987, 1990, 1991, 1992, 1994, 1995, 1997, 2009, 2015, 2016, 2022 | (0) | (0) |
| Bryant University | Bulldogs | Smithfield | Rhode Island | America East Conference | | 2000 (Div. I in 2009) | (7) 2008 (Div II), 2013, 2014, 2015, 2017, 2021, 2023 | (0) | (0) |
| Bucknell University | Bison | Lewisburg | Pennsylvania | Patriot League | | 1968 | (2) 2001, 2011 | (0) | (0) |
| Canisius University | Golden Griffins | Buffalo | New York | Metro Conference | | 1990 | (3) 2008, 2012, 2018 | (0) | (0) |
| Cleveland State University | Vikings | Cleveland | Ohio | NEC | Horizon League | 2017 | (0) | (0) | (0) |
| Colgate University | Raiders | Hamilton | New York | Patriot League | | 1921 | (4) 2008, 2012, 2015, 2025 | (0) | (0) |
| Cornell University | Big Red | Ithaca | New York | Ivy League | | 1892 | (31) 1971, 1974, 1975, 1976, 1977, 1978, 1979, 1980, 1982, 1983, 1987, 1988, 1989, 1995, 2000, 2002, 2004, 2005, 2006, 2007, 2008, 2009, 2010, 2011, 2013, 2014, 2015, 2018, 2022, 2023, 2025 | (4) 1971, 1976, 1977, 2025 | (4) 1903, 1907, 1914, 1916 |
| Dartmouth College | Big Green | Hanover | New Hampshire | Ivy League | | 1926 | (1) 2003 | (0) | (0) |
| University of Delaware | Fightin' Blue Hens | Newark | Delaware | Atlantic 10 Conference | Conference USA | 1948 | (8) 1984, 1999, 2005, 2007, 2010, 2011, 2022, 2023 | (0) | (0) |
| University of Denver | Pioneers | Denver | Colorado | Big East Conference | West Coast Conference | 1966 (Div. I in 1999) | (13) 2006, 2008, 2010, 2011, 2012, 2013, 2014, 2015, 2016, 2017, 2018, 2021, 2024 | (1) 2015 | (0) |
| University of Detroit Mercy | Titans | Detroit | Michigan | NEC | Horizon League | 2009 | (1) 2013 | (0) | (0) |
| Drexel University | Dragons | Philadelphia | Pennsylvania | Coastal Athletic Association | | 1941 | (2) 2014, 2021 | (0) | (0) |
| Duke University | Blue Devils | Durham | North Carolina | Atlantic Coast Conference | | 1938 | (27) 1992, 1994, 1995, 1997, 1998, 1999, 2000, 2001, 2002, 2005, 2007, 2008, 2009, 2010, 2011, 2012, 2013, 2014, 2015, 2016, 2017, 2018, 2019, 2021, 2023, 2024, 2025 | (3) 2010, 2013, 2014 | (0) |
| Fairfield University | Stags | Fairfield | Connecticut | Coastal Athletic Association | Metro Conference (CAA in 2028) | 1973 | (2) 2002, 2005 | (0) | (0) |
| Georgetown University | Hoyas | Washington | D.C. | Big East Conference | | 1951 | (18) 1997, 1998, 1999, 2000, 2001, 2002, 2003, 2004, 2005, 2006, 2007, 2018, 2019, 2021, 2022, 2023, 2024, 2025 | (0) | (0) |
| Hampton University | Pirates | Hampton | Virginia | Coastal Athletic Association | | 2016 | (0) | (0) | (0) |
| Harvard University | Crimson | Boston (Note: Although Harvard's overall administration and undergraduate campus are located in Cambridge, Massachusetts, its athletic department offices and most of its athletic facilities, including its lacrosse stadium, are in Boston and have a Boston mailing address.) | Massachusetts | Ivy League | | 1878 | (8) 1980, 1988, 1990, 1996, 2006, 2014, 2022, 2025 | (0) | (13) 1881, 1882, 1885, 1886, 1887, 1905, 1908, 1909, 1910, 1911, 1912, 1913, 1915 |
| High Point University | Panthers | High Point | North Carolina | Atlantic 10 Conference | Big South Conference | 2013 | (2) 2015, 2021 | (0) | (0) |
| Hobart College | Statesmen | Geneva | New York | Atlantic 10 Conference | Liberty League (NCAA D-III) | 1898 (Div. I in 1995) | (26) 1980, 1981, 1982, 1983, 1984, 1985, 1986, 1987, 1988, 1989, 1990, 1991, 1992, 1993, 1994 (Div III) 1974, 1975, 1976, 1977, 1978, 1979 (Div II) 1998, 2000, 2002, 2004, 2016 (Div I) | (15) 1976, 1977 (Div II) 1980, 1981, 1982, 1983, 1984, 1985, 1986, 1987, 1988, 1989, 1990, 1991, 1993 (Div III) | (1) (USILA College Div): 1972 |
| Hofstra University | Pride | Hempstead | New York | Coastal Athletic Association | | 1949 | (17) 1971, 1973, 1974, 1975, 1978, 1993, 1996, 1997, 1999, 2000, 2001, 2003, 2006, 2008, 2009, 2010, 2011 | (0) | (1) 1955 (Division II Champion, Laurie Cox Trophy) |
| College of the Holy Cross | Crusaders | Worcester | Massachusetts | Patriot League | | 1958 | (0) | (0) | (0) |
| Iona University | Gaels | New Rochelle | New York | Metro Conference | | 2024 | (0) | (0) | (0) |
| Jacksonville University | Dolphins | Jacksonville | Florida | Atlantic Sun Conference | | 2010 | (0) | (0) | (0) |
| Johns Hopkins University | Blue Jays | Baltimore | Maryland | Big Ten Conference | Centennial Conference (NCAA D-III) | 1883 | (49) 1972, 1973, 1974, 1975, 1976, 1977, 1978, 1979, 1980, 1981, 1982, 1983, 1984, 1985, 1986, 1987, 1988, 1989, 1990, 1991, 1992, 1993, 1994, 1995, 1996, 1997, 1998, 1999, 2000, 2001, 2002, 2003, 2004, 2005, 2006, 2007, 2008, 2009, 2010, 2011, 2012, 2014, 2015, 2016, 2017, 2018, 2019, 2023, 2024 | (9) 1974, 1978, 1979, 1980, 1984, 1985, 1987, 2005, 2007 | (35) 1891, 1898, 1899, 1900, 1902, 1903, 1906, 1907, 1908, 1909, 1911, 1913, 1915, 1918, 1919, 1922, 1923, 1924, 1926, 1927, 1928, 1932, 1933, 1934, 1941, 1947, 1948, 1949, 1950, 1957, 1959, 1967, 1968, 1969, 1970 |
| Lafayette College | Leopards | Easton | Pennsylvania | Patriot League | | 1926 | (0) | (0) | (0) |
| Lehigh University | Mountain Hawks | Bethlehem | Pennsylvania | Patriot League | | 1890 | (4) 2012, 2013, 2021, 2024 | (0) | (0) |
| Le Moyne College | Dolphins | Syracuse (Note: The Le Moyne campus has a Syracuse mailing address but is physically located in the adjacent town of DeWitt.) | New York | NEC (Metro in 2028) | | 1984 (Div. I in 2024) | (20) (Div II): 2002, 2003, 2004, 2005, 2006, 2007, 2008, 2009, 2010, 2012, 2013, 2014, 2015, 2016, 2017, 2018, 2019, 2021, 2022, 2023 | (20) (Div II): 2004, 2006, 2007, 2013, 2016, 2021 | (0) |
| Long Island University (LIU) (Note: Long Island University's current athletic program was formed in July 2019 with the merger of the athletic programs of its two campuses—the Division I LIU Brooklyn Blackbirds, which fielded a women's lacrosse team but no men's team, and the Division II LIU Post Pioneers, which fielded both men's and women's teams. The current LIU program sponsors all varsity sports that had previously been fielded at either campus.) | Sharks | Brookville (Note: The LIU men's lacrosse team is based at the Post campus, the only LIU campus that previously had a men's team.) | New York | NEC | | 1960 (Note: First season of play for C. W. Post College, later known as LIU Post.) (Div. I in 2020) (Note: First Division I season of 2020 canceled in progress due to the COVID-19 pandemic.) | (0) (Note: Does not include appearances and titles in lower divisions.) | (0) | (0) |
| Loyola University | Greyhounds | Baltimore | Maryland | Patriot League | | 1890 | (27) 1979, 1981 (Div II), 1988, 1989, 1990, 1991, 1992, 1993, 1994, 1995, 1996, 1997, 1998, 1999, 2000, 2001, 2007, 2008, 2010, 2012, 2013, 2014, 2016, 2017, 2018, 2019, 2021 | (1) 2012 | (0) |
| Manhattan University | Jaspers | Riverdale | New York | Metro Conference | | 1996 | (1) 2002 | (0) | (0) |
| Marist University | Red Foxes | Poughkeepsie | New York | Metro Conference | | 1992 | (3) 2005, 2015, 2019 | (0) | (0) |
| Marquette University | Golden Eagles | Milwaukee | Wisconsin | Big East Conference | | 2013 | (2) 2016, 2017 | (0) | (0) |
| University of Maryland | Terrapins | College Park | Maryland | Big Ten Conference | | 1924 | (47) 1971, 1972, 1973, 1974, 1975, 1976, 1977, 1978, 1979, 1981, 1982, 1983, 1986, 1987, 1989, 1991, 1992, 1993, 1994, 1995, 1996, 1997, 1998, 2000, 2001, 2003, 2004, 2005, 2006, 2007, 2008, 2009, 2010, 2011, 2012, 2013, 2014, 2015, 2016, 2017, 2018, 2019, 2021, 2022, 2023, 2024, 2025 | (4) 1973, 1975, 2017, 2022 | (9) 1928, 1936, 1937, 1939, 1940, 1955, 1956, 1959, 1967 |
| University of Maryland, Baltimore County (UMBC) | Retrievers | Catonsville (Note: The campus has a Baltimore mailing address.) | Maryland | America East Conference | | 1968 (Div. I in 1981) | (14) (Div II): 1974, 1975, 1976, 1977, 1978, 1979, 1980; (Div I): 1998, 1999, 2006, 2007, 2008, 2009, 2019 | (1) (Div II): 1980 | (0) |
| University of Massachusetts Amherst (UMass) | Minutemen | Amherst | Massachusetts | Atlantic 10 Conference | Mid-American Conference | 1954 | (20) 1976, 1977, 1979, 1981, 1986, 1987, 1988, 1989, 1990, 1991, 1993, 1995, 1997, 2002, 2003, 2005, 2006, 2009, 2012, 2018 | (0) | (0) |
| University of Massachusetts Lowell (UMass Lowell) | River Hawks | Lowell | Massachusetts | America East Conference | | 2015 | (0) | (0) | (0) |
| Mercer University | Bears | Macon | Georgia | Atlantic Sun Conference | Southern Conference | 2010 | (0) | (0) | (0) |
| Mercyhurst University | Lakers | Erie | Pennsylvania | NEC | | 1997 (Div. I in 2025) | (0) | (0) | (0) |
| Merrimack College | Warriors | North Andover | Massachusetts | Metro Conference | | 1996 (Div. I in 2020) | (6) (Div II): 2009, 2015, 2016, 2017, 2018, 2019 | (2) (Div II): 2018, 2019 | (0) |
| University of Michigan | Wolverines | Ann Arbor | Michigan | Big Ten Conference | | 1940 (Div. I in 2012) | (2) 2023, 2024 | (0) | (3) (MCLA): 2008, 2009, 2010 |
| Monmouth University | Hawks | West Long Branch | New Jersey | Coastal Athletic Association | | 2013 | (2)2017, 2021 | (0) | (0) |
| Mount St. Mary's University | Mountaineers | Emmitsburg (Note: The campus has an Emmitsburg mailing address, but lies in unincorporated Frederick County.) | Maryland | Metro Conference | | 1970 (Div. I in 1989) | (2) 2003, 2010 | (0) | (0) |
| United States Naval Academy (Navy) | Midshipmen | Annapolis | Maryland | Patriot League | | 1908 | (27) 1971, 1972, 1973, 1974, 1975, 1976, 1977, 1978, 1979, 1980, 1981, 1982, 1986, 1987, 1988, 1989, 1992, 1993, 1994, 1999, 2004, 2005, 2006, 2007, 2008, 2009, 2016 | (0) | (17) 1928, 1929, 1938, 1943, 1945, 1946, 1949, 1954, 1960, 1961, 1962, 1963, 1964, 1965, 1966, 1967, 1970 |
| New Jersey Institute of Technology (NJIT) | Highlanders | Newark | New Jersey | America East Conference | | 2015 | (0) | (0) | (0) |
| University of North Carolina at Chapel Hill | Tar Heels | Chapel Hill | North Carolina | Atlantic Coast Conference | | 1949 | (34) 1976, 1977, 1980, 1981, 1982, 1983, 1984, 1985, 1986, 1987, 1988, 1989, 1990, 1991, 1992, 1993, 1994, 1995, 1996, 1998, 2004, 2007, 2008, 2009, 2010, 2011, 2012, 2013, 2014, 2015, 2016, 2017, 2021, 2025 | (5) 1981, 1982, 1986, 1991, 2016 | (0) |
| University of Notre Dame | Fighting Irish | Notre Dame | Indiana | Atlantic Coast Conference | | 1981 | (28) 1990, 1992, 1993, 1994, 1995, 1996, 1997, 1999, 2000, 2001, 2006, 2007, 2008, 2009, 2010, 2011, 2012, 2013, 2014, 2015, 2016, 2017, 2018, 2019, 2021, 2023, 2024, 2025 | (2) 2023, 2024 | (0) |
| Ohio State University | Buckeyes | Columbus | Ohio | Big Ten Conference | | 1953 | (8) 2003, 2004, 2008, 2013, 2015, 2017, 2022, 2025 | (0) | (0) |
| University of Pennsylvania (Penn) | Quakers | Philadelphia | Pennsylvania | Ivy League | | 1900 | (14) 1975, 1977, 1983, 1984, 1985, 1987, 1988, 1989, 2004, 2006, 2011, 2014, 2019, 2022 | (0) | (0) |
| Pennsylvania State University (Penn State) | Nittany Lions | University Park (Note: The U.S. Postal Service designates the entire Penn State campus as "University Park, Pennsylvania". The campus straddles the boundary between State College, home to Penn State's academic core, and College Township, which hosts most athletic facilities.) | Pennsylvania | Big Ten Conference | | 1913 | (8) 2003, 2005, 2013, 2017, 2019, 2023, 2024, 2025 | (0) | (0) |
| Princeton University | Tigers | Princeton | New Jersey | Ivy League | | 1882 | (24) 1990, 1991, 1992, 1993, 1994, 1995, 1996, 1997, 1998, 1999, 2000, 2001, 2002, 2003, 2004, 2006, 2007, 2009, 2010, 2012, 2022, 2023, 2024, 2025 | (6) 1992, 1994, 1996, 1997, 1998, 2001 | (6) 1884, 1885, 1937, 1942, 1951, 1953 |
| Providence College | Friars | Providence | Rhode Island | Big East Conference | | 1980 | (3) 2004, 2006, 2007 | (0) | (0) |
| Queens University of Charlotte | Royals | Charlotte | North Carolina | Atlantic Sun Conference | | 2009 (Div. I in 2023) | (0) | (0) | (0) |
| Quinnipiac University | Bobcats | Hamden | Connecticut | Metro Conference | | 1991 | (1) 2016 | (0) | (0) |
| University of Richmond | Spiders | Richmond | Virginia | Atlantic 10 Conference | | 2014 | (6) 2014, 2018, 2019, 2022, 2023, 2025 | (0) | (0) |
| Robert Morris University | Colonials | Moon Township | Pennsylvania | NEC | Horizon League | 2005 | (2) 2018, 2019 | (0) | (0) |
| Rutgers University–New Brunswick (Rutgers) | Scarlet Knights | Piscataway (Note: The university is divided between New Brunswick and Piscataway. The university administration is in New Brunswick, while the athletic department and athletic facilities are in Piscataway.) | New Jersey | Big Ten Conference | | 1887 | (11) 1972, 1974, 1975, 1984, 1986, 1990, 1991, 2003, 2004, 2021, 2022 | (0) | (0) |
| Sacred Heart University | Pioneers | Fairfield | Connecticut | Metro Conference | | 1991 | (1) 2024 | (0) | (0) |
| St. Bonaventure University | Bonnies | St. Bonaventure | New York | Atlantic 10 Conference | | 2019 | (0) | (0) | (0) |
| St. John's University | Red Storm | Jamaica | New York | Big East Conference | | 1981 | (0) | (0) | (0) |
| Saint Joseph's University | Hawks | Philadelphia (Note: The entire university has a Philadelphia mailing address, but straddles the boundary between Philadelphia and Lower Merion Township. The lacrosse stadium is in Philadelphia.) | Pennsylvania | Atlantic 10 Conference | | 1993 | (2) 2022, 2024 | (0) | (0) |
| Siena University | Saints | Loudonville | New York | Metro Conference | | 1964 (Div. I in 1977) | (4) 2009, 2011, 2014, 2025 | (0) | (0) |
| Stony Brook University | Seawolves | Stony Brook | New York | Coastal Athletic Association | | 1983 (Div. I in 1988) | (3) 2002, 2010, 2012 | (0) | (0) |
| Syracuse University | Orange | Syracuse | New York | Atlantic Coast Conference | | 1916 | (42) 1979, 1980, 1981, 1983, 1984, 1985, 1986, 1987, 1988, 1989, 1990, 1991, 1992, 1993, 1994, 1995, 1996, 1997, 1998, 1999, 2000, 2001, 2002, 2003, 2004, 2005, 2006, 2008, 2009, 2010, 2011, 2012, 2013, 2014, 2015, 2016, 2017, 2018, 2019, 2021, 2024, 2025 | (11) 1983, 1988, 1989, 1990, 1993, 1995, 2000, 2002, 2004, 2008, 2009 | (5) 1920, 1922, 1924, 1925, 1957 |
| Towson University | Tigers | Towson | Maryland | Coastal Athletic Association | | 1958 (Div. I in 1980) | (17) 1989, 1991, 1992, 1994, 1996, 2001, 2003, 2004, 2005, 2007, 2013, 2015, 2016, 2017, 2019, 2024, 2025 | (0) | (0) |
| University of Utah | Utes | Salt Lake City | Utah | Atlantic Sun Conference | Big 12 Conference | 2019 | (2) 2023, 2024 | (0) | (0) |
| University of Vermont | Catamounts | Burlington | Vermont | America East Conference | | 1978 | (2) 2021, 2022 | (0) | (0) |
| Villanova University | Wildcats | Villanova | Pennsylvania | Big East Conference | | 1981 | (3) 2009, 2011, 2018 | (0) | (0) |
| University of Virginia | Cavaliers | Charlottesville (Note: The entire Virginia campus has a Charlottesville mailing address, but the lacrosse stadium is in Albemarle County, which encloses but does not include the city of Charlottesville.) | Virginia | Atlantic Coast Conference | | 1904 | (43) 1971, 1972, 1973, 1974, 1978, 1979, 1980, 1981, 1982, 1983, 1984, 1985, 1986, 1988, 1990, 1991, 1993, 1994, 1995, 1996, 1997, 1998, 1999, 2000, 2001, 2002, 2003, 2005, 2006, 2007, 2008, 2009, 2010, 2011, 2012, 2014, 2015, 2018, 2019, 2021, 2022, 2023, 2024 | (7) 1972, 1999, 2003, 2006, 2011, 2019, 2021 | (2) 1952, 1970 |
| Virginia Military Institute (VMI) | Keydets | Lexington | Virginia | NEC | Southern Conference | 1983 | (0) | (0) | (0) |
| Wagner College | Seahawks | Staten Island | New York | NEC | | 1999 | (0) | (0) | (0) |
| Yale University | Bulldogs | New Haven | Connecticut | Ivy League | | 1882 | (12) 1988, 1990, 1992, 2012, 2013, 2015, 2016, 2017, 2018, 2019, 2022, 2025 | (1) 2018 | (1) 1883 |

=== Future men's teams ===
| School | Team | City | State | Future conference | First season |
|---|---|---|---|---|---|
| Southern Methodist University (SMU) | Mustangs | Dallas (Note: The SMU campus is almost entirely located in University Park, Texas, which, with the adjacent town of Highland Park, is completely surrounded by the city of Dallas. However, the U.S. Postal Service considers all locations in University Park to have a Dallas address.) | Texas | Atlantic Coast Conference | 2028 |

== Women ==
| School | Team | City | State | Conference | Primary conference | First played | NCAA Tournament appearances | NCAA national championships | Pre-NCAA national championships |
|---|---|---|---|---|---|---|---|---|---|
| University of Akron | Zips | Akron | Ohio | Mid-American Conference | | 2020 | (1) 2025 | (0) | (0) |
| University at Albany (Albany) | Great Danes | Albany | New York | America East Conference | | 1992 (Div. I in 2000) | (7) 2011, 2012, 2015, 2017, 2023, 2025, 2026 | (0) | (0) |
| American University | Eagles | Washington | D.C. | Patriot League | | 1992 | (1) 2003 | (0) | (0) |
| Arizona State University | Sun Devils | Tempe | Arizona | Big 12 Conference | | 2018 | (0) | (0) | (0) |
| United States Military Academy (Army) | Black Knights | West Point | New York | Patriot League | | 2016 | (3) 2023, 2025, 2026 | (0) | (0) |
| Austin Peay State University | Governors | Clarksville | Tennessee | Atlantic Sun Conference | United Athletic Conference | 2026 | (0) | (0) | (0) |
| Binghamton University | Bearcats | Binghamton | New York | America East Conference | | 2002 | (1) 2024 | (0) | (0) |
| Boston College | Eagles | Newton (Note: The main campus has a Chestnut Hill mailing address, but almost entirely lies within the city of Newton. The lacrosse stadium is on a separate campus within the Newton city limits and with a Newton mailing address.) | Massachusetts | Atlantic Coast Conference | | 1992 | (14) 2011, 2013, 2014, 2015, 2016, 2017, 2018, 2019, 2021, 2022, 2023, 2024, 2025, 2026 | (2) 2021, 2024 | (0) |
| Boston University | Terriers | Boston | Massachusetts | Patriot League | | 1980 | (8) 2000, 2003, 2005, 2006, 2007, 2008, 2009, 2010 | (0) | (0) |
| Brown University | Bears | Providence | Rhode Island | Ivy League | | 1975 | (1) 2025 | (0) | (0) |
| Bryant University | Bulldogs | Smithfield | Rhode Island | America East Conference | | 2002 (Div. I in 2009) | (3) 2014, 2015, 2017 | (0) | (0) |
| Bucknell University | Bison | Lewisburg | Pennsylvania | Patriot League | | 1978 | (0) | (0) | (0) |
| Butler University | Bulldogs | Indianapolis | Indiana | Big East Conference | | 2017 | (0) | (0) | (0) |
| University of California, Berkeley (California) | Golden Bears | Berkeley | California | Atlantic Coast Conference | | 1999 | (0) | (0) | (0) |
| Campbell University | Fighting Camels | Buies Creek | North Carolina | Coastal Athletic Association | | 2013 | (0) | (0) | (0) |
| Canisius University | Golden Griffins | Buffalo | New York | Metro Conference | | 1998 | (4) 2013, 2014, 2016, 2017 | (0) | (0) |
| Central Connecticut State University | Blue Devils | New Britain | Connecticut | NEC | | 2000 | (0) | (0) | (0) |
| Central Michigan University | Chippewas | Mount Pleasant | Michigan | Mid-American Conference | | 2016 | (0) | (0) | (0) |
| University of North Carolina at Charlotte (Charlotte) | 49ers | Charlotte | North Carolina | American Conference | | 2025 | (0) | (0) | (0) |
| University of Cincinnati | Bearcats | Cincinnati | Ohio | Big 12 Conference | | 2008 | (0) | (0) | (0) |
| Clemson University | Tigers | Clemson | South Carolina | Atlantic Coast Conference | | 2023 | (2) 2025, 2026 | (0) | (0) |
| Coastal Carolina University | Chanticleers | Conway | South Carolina | Atlantic Sun Conference | Sun Belt Conference | 2013 | (1) 2024 | (0) | (0) |
| Colgate University | Raiders | Hamilton | New York | Patriot League | | 1974 | (4) 2004, 2005, 2008, 2009 | (0) | (0) |
| University of Colorado Boulder (Colorado) | Buffaloes | Boulder | Colorado | Big 12 Conference | | 2014 | (4) 2017, 2018, 2019, 2026 | (0) | (0) |
| Columbia University | Lions | New York (Note: "New York" is the mailing address for Columbia's location of Manhattan. The rest of New York City is served by either borough or local post offices.) | New York | Ivy League | | 1997 | (0) | (0) | (0) |
| Cornell University | Big Red | Ithaca | New York | Ivy League | | 1972 | (5) 2001, 2002, 2006, 2016, 2017 | (0) | (0) |
| Dartmouth College | Big Green | Hanover | New Hampshire | Ivy League | | 1973 | (15) 1983, 1993, 1995, 1998, 1999, 2000, 2001, 2003, 2004, 2005, 2006, 2011, 2012, 2013, 2019 | (0) | (0) |
| Davidson College | Wildcats | Davidson | North Carolina | Atlantic 10 Conference | | 1994 | (1) 2026 | (0) | (0) |
| University of Delaware | Fightin' Blue Hens | Newark | Delaware | Atlantic Sun Conference | Conference USA | 1978 | (3) 1983, 1984, 2000 | (1) 1983 | (2) (AIAW Div. II): 1981, 1982 |
| Delaware State University | Hornets | Dover | Delaware | NEC | Mid-Eastern Athletic Conference | 2013 | (0) | (0) | (0) |
| University of Denver | Pioneers | Denver | Colorado | Big East Conference | West Coast Conference | 1999 | (10) 2013, 2014, 2018, 2019, 2021, 2022, 2023, 2024, 2025, 2026 | (0) | (0) |
| University of Detroit Mercy | Titans | Detroit | Michigan | Mid-American Conference | Horizon League | 2009 | (0) | (0) | (0) |
| Drexel University | Dragons | Philadelphia | Pennsylvania | Coastal Athletic Association | | 1983 | (0) | (0) | (0) |
| Duke University | Blue Devils | Durham | North Carolina | Atlantic Coast Conference | | 1996 | (23) 1998, 1999, 2000, 2001, 2002, 2003, 2004, 2005, 2006, 2007, 2008, 2009, 2010, 2011, 2012, 2013, 2014, 2015, 2016, 2021, 2022, 2024, 2025 | (0) | (0) |
| Duquesne University | Dukes | Pittsburgh | Pennsylvania | Atlantic 10 Conference | | 1997 | (0) | (0) | (0) |
| East Carolina University | Pirates | Greenville | North Carolina | American Conference | | 2018 | (0) | (0) | (0) |
| Eastern Michigan University | Eagles | Ypsilanti | Michigan | Mid-American Conference | | 2022 | (0) | (0) | (0) |
| Elon University | Phoenix | Elon | North Carolina | Coastal Athletic Association | | 2014 | (1) 2017 | (0) | (0) |
| Fairfield University | Stags | Fairfield | Connecticut | Metro Conference (CAA in 2028) | | 1997 | (10) 2009, 2015, 2018, 2019, 2021, 2022, 2023, 2024, 2025, 2026 | (0) | (0) |
| Fairleigh Dickinson University | Knights | Teaneck | New Jersey | NEC | | 2023 | (0) | (0) | (0) |
| University of Florida | Gators | Gainesville | Florida | Big 12 Conference | Southeastern Conference | 2010 | (15) 2011, 2012, 2013, 2014, 2015, 2016, 2017, 2018, 2019, 2021, 2022, 2023, 2024, 2025, 2026 | (0) | (0) |
| Florida State University | Seminoles | Tallahassee | Florida | Atlantic Coast Conference | | 2026 | (0) | (0) | (0) |
| Furman University | Paladins | Greenville | South Carolina | Big South Conference | Southern Conference | 2015 | (0) | (0) | (0) |
| Gardner–Webb University | Runnin' Bulldogs | Boiling Springs | North Carolina | Big South Conference | | 2015 | (0) | (0) | (0) |
| George Mason University | Patriots | Fairfax (Note: The main George Mason campus has a Fairfax mailing address but is physically in unincorporated Fairfax County.) | Virginia | Atlantic 10 Conference | | 1994 | (0) | (0) | (0) |
| George Washington University | Revolutionaries | Washington | D.C. | Atlantic 10 Conference | | 2002 | (0) | (0) | (0) |
| Georgetown University | Hoyas | Washington | D.C. | Big East Conference | | 1977 | (16) 1998, 1999, 2000, 2001, 2002, 2003, 2004, 2005, 2006, 2008, 2009, 2010, 2013, 2014, 2018, 2019 | (0) | (0) |
| Harvard University | Crimson | Boston | Massachusetts | Ivy League | | 1975 | (9) 1983, 1984, 1988, 1989, 1990, 1991, 1992, 1993, 1994 | (1) 1990 | (0) |
| High Point University | Panthers | High Point | North Carolina | Big South Conference | | 2011 | (6) 2013, 2014, 2017, 2018, 2019, 2021 | (0) | (0) |
| Hofstra University | Pride | Hempstead | New York | Coastal Athletic Association | | 1976 | (3) 2001, 2007, 2021 | (0) | (0) |
| College of the Holy Cross | Crusaders | Worcester | Massachusetts | Patriot League | | 1980 | (2) 2006, 2007 | (0) | (0) |
| Howard University | Lady Bison | Washington | D.C. | NEC | Mid-Eastern Athletic Conference | 1998 | (0) | (0) | (0) |
| Iona University | Gaels | New Rochelle | New York | Metro Conference | | 2005 | (0) | (0) | (0) |
| Jacksonville University | Dolphins | Jacksonville | Florida | Atlantic Sun Conference | | 2010 | (10) 2013, 2014, 2015, 2017, 2018, 2019, 2021, 2022, 2023, 2026 | (0) | (0) |
| James Madison University | Dukes | Harrisonburg | Virginia | American Conference | Sun Belt Conference (American no later than 2029) | 1974 | (22) 1995, 1997, 1998, 1999, 2000, 2001, 2003, 2004, 2006, 2010, 2011, 2015, 2016, 2017, 2018, 2019, 2021, 2022, 2023, 2024, 2025, 2026 | (1) 2018 | (0) |
| Johns Hopkins University | Blue Jays | Baltimore | Maryland | Big Ten Conference | Centennial Conference (NCAA D-III) | 1976 (Div. I in 1999) | (14) 2004, 2005, 2007, 2014, 2015, 2016, 2018, 2019, 2021, 2022, 2023, 2024, 2025, 2026 | (0) | (0) |
| Kennesaw State University | Owls | Kennesaw (Note: The main Kennesaw State campus has a Kennesaw mailing address but is physically located in unincorporated Cobb County.) | Georgia | Atlantic Sun Conference | Conference USA | 2013 | (0) | (0) | (0) |
| Kent State University | Golden Flashes | Kent | Ohio | Mid-American Conference | | 2019 | (0) | (0) | (0) |
| La Salle University | Explorers | Philadelphia | Pennsylvania | Atlantic 10 Conference | | 1998 | (0) | (0) | (0) |
| Lafayette College | Leopards | Easton | Pennsylvania | Patriot League | | 1976 | (2) 1991, 2002 | (0) | (0) |
| Lehigh University | Mountain Hawks | Bethlehem | Pennsylvania | Patriot League | | 1975 (Div. I in 1983) | (0) | (0) | (0) |
| Le Moyne College | Dolphins | Syracuse | New York | NEC (Metro in 2028) | | 1994 (Div. I in 2024) | (11) (Div. I): 2007 (Div. II): 2011, 2012, 2013, 2015, 2016, 2017, 2018, 2019, 2022, 2023 | (1) (Div. II): 2018 | (0) |
| Liberty University | Lady Flames | Lynchburg | Virginia | Atlantic Sun Conference | Conference USA | 2010 | (1) 2025 | (0) | (0) |
| Lindenwood University | Lions | St. Charles | Missouri | Atlantic Sun Conference | Ohio Valley Conference | 2012 (Div. I in 2023) | (8) (Div II): 2014, 2015, 2016, 2017, 2018, 2019, 2021, 2022 | (1) (Div II): 2021 | (0) |
| Long Island University (LIU) | Sharks | Brookville | New York | NEC | | 2003 | (2) 2024, 2025 | (0) | (0) |
| Longwood University | Lancers | Farmville | Virginia | Big South Conference | | 1972 (Div. I in 2007) | (0) | (0) | (0) |
| University of Louisville | Cardinals | Louisville | Kentucky | Atlantic Coast Conference | | 2008 | (4) 2014, 2015, 2016, 2017 | (0) | (0) |
| Loyola University Maryland | Greyhounds | Baltimore | Maryland | Patriot League | | 1973 | (28) 1983, 1984, 1985, 1990, 1994, 1996, 1997, 1998, 1999, 2000, 2001, 2002, 2003, 2004, 2011, 2012, 2013, 2014, 2015, 2016, 2018, 2019, 2021, 2022, 2023, 2024, 2025, 2026 | (0) | (0) |
| Manhattan University | Jaspers | Riverdale | New York | Metro Conference | | 1997 | (2) 2004, 2005 | (0) | (0) |
| Marist University | Red Foxes | Poughkeepsie | New York | Metro Conference | | 1997 | (2) 2008, 2010 | (0) | (0) |
| Marquette University | Golden Eagles | Milwaukee | Wisconsin | Big East Conference | | 2013 | (1) 2023 | (0) | (0) |
| University of Maryland, College Park (Maryland) | Terrapins | College Park | Maryland | Big Ten Conference | | 1974 | (41) 1983, 1984, 1985, 1986, 1987, 1990, 1991, 1992, 1993, 1994, 1995, 1996, 1997, 1998, 1999, 2000, 2001, 2002, 2003, 2004, 2005, 2006, 2007, 2008, 2009, 2010, 2011, 2012, 2013, 2014, 2015, 2016, 2017, 2018, 2019, 2021, 2022, 2023, 2024, 2025, 2026 | (14) 1986, 1992, 1995, 1996, 1997, 1998, 1999, 2000, 2001, 2010, 2014, 2015, 2017, 2019 | (1) (AIAW Div. I): 1981 |
| Mercer University | Bears | Macon | Georgia | Big South Conference | Southern Conference | 2015 | (8) 2018, 2019, 2021, 2022, 2023, 2024, 2025, 2026 | (0) | (0) |
| Mercyhurst University | Lakers | Erie | Pennsylvania | NEC | | 1997 (Div. I in 2025) | (4) (Div II): 2016, 2018, 2019, 2022 | (0) | (0) |
| Merrimack College | Warriors | North Andover | Massachusetts | Metro Conference | | 2000 (Div. I in 2020) | (0) | (0) | (0) |
| University of Michigan | Wolverines | Ann Arbor | Michigan | Big Ten Conference | | 2014 | (6) 2019, 2022, 2023, 2024, 2025, 2026 | (0) | (0) |
| Monmouth University | Hawks | West Long Branch | New Jersey | Coastal Athletic Association | | 1995 | (5) 2001, 2006, 2007, 2012, 2013 | (0) | (0) |
| Mount St. Mary's University | Mountaineers | Emmitsburg | Maryland | Metro Conference | | 1996 | (4) 2004, 2005, 2021, 2022 | (0) | (0) |
| United States Naval Academy (Navy) | Midshipmen | Annapolis | Maryland | Patriot League | | 2008 | (9) 2010, 2011, 2012, 2013, 2017, 2018, 2019, 2025, 2026 | (0) | (0) |
| University of New Hampshire | Wildcats | Durham | New Hampshire | America East Conference | | 1977 | (7) 1984, 1985, 1986, 1987, 1991, 2004, 2008 | (1) 1985 | (0) |
| University of New Haven | Chargers | West Haven | Connecticut | NEC | | 2001 (Div. I in 2026) | (7) (Div. II): 2009, 2014, 2015, 2016, 2017, 2023, 2024 | (0) | (0) |
| Niagara University | Purple Eagles | Niagara University (Note: The Niagara campus is its own census-designated place and postal entity within the town of Lewiston.) | New York | Metro Conference | | 1996 | (Div. II): 2011, 2012, 2013, 2015, 2016, 2017, 2018, 2019, 2022, 2023 | (0) | (0) |
| University of North Carolina at Chapel Hill (North Carolina) | Tar Heels | Chapel Hill | North Carolina | Atlantic Coast Conference | | 1996 | (27) 1997, 1998, 1999, 2000, 2001, 2002, 2005, 2006, 2007, 2008, 2009, 2010, 2011, 2012, 2013, 2014, 2015, 2016, 2017, 2018, 2019, 2021, 2022, 2023, 2024, 2025, 2026 | (4) 2013, 2016, 2022, 2025 | (0) |
| Northwestern University | Wildcats | Evanston | Illinois | Big Ten Conference | | 1982 | (27) 1983, 1984, 1986, 1987, 1988, 2004, 2005, 2006, 2007, 2008, 2009, 2010, 2011, 2012, 2013, 2014, 2015, 2016, 2017, 2018, 2019, 2021, 2022, 2023, 2024, 2025, 2026 | (9) 2005, 2006, 2007, 2008, 2009, 2011, 2012, 2023, 2026 | (0) |
| University of Notre Dame | Fighting Irish | Notre Dame | Indiana | Atlantic Coast Conference | | 1997 | (18) 2002, 2004, 2006, 2008, 2009, 2010, 2012, 2013, 2014, 2015, 2016, 2017, 2019, 2021, 2022, 2023, 2024, 2026 | (0) | (0) |
| Ohio State University | Buckeyes | Columbus | Ohio | Big Ten Conference | | 1996 | (4) 2002, 2003, 2014, 2015 | (0) | (0) |
| Old Dominion University | Monarchs | Norfolk | Virginia | American Conference | Sun Belt Conference | 1980 | (1) 2016 | (0) | (0) |
| University of Oregon | Ducks | Eugene | Oregon | Big Ten Conference | | 2005 | (1) 2012 | (0) | (0) |
| University of Pennsylvania (Penn) | Quakers | Philadelphia | Pennsylvania | Ivy League | | 1974 | (18) 1983, 1984, 2007, 2008, 2009, 2010, 2011, 2012, 2013, 2014, 2015, 2016, 2017, 2018, 2019, 2023, 2024, 2025 | (0) | (0) |
| Pennsylvania State University (Penn State) | Nittany Lions | University Park | Pennsylvania | Big Ten Conference | | 1965 | (28) 1983, 1984, 1985, 1986, 1987, 1988, 1989, 1990, 1991, 1992, 1993, 1995, 1996, 1997, 1998, 1999, 2001, 2005, 2012, 2013, 2014, 2015, 2016, 2017, 2018, 2023, 2024, 2026 | (2) 1987, 1989 | (3) (USWLA): 1978, 1979, 1980 |
| University of Pittsburgh (Pitt) | Panthers | Pittsburgh | Pennsylvania | Atlantic Coast Conference | | 2022 | (0) | (0) | (0) |
| Presbyterian College | Blue Hose | Clinton | South Carolina | Big South Conference | | 2006 (Div. I in 2007) | (0) | (0) | (0) |
| Princeton University | Tigers | Princeton | New Jersey | Ivy League | | 1973 | (31) 1983, 1989, 1992, 1993, 1994, 1995, 1996, 1998, 1999, 2000, 2001, 2002, 2003, 2004, 2005, 2006, 2007, 2008, 2009, 2011, 2013, 2014, 2015, 2016, 2017, 2018, 2019, 2022, 2024, 2025, 2026 | (3) 1994, 2002, 2003 | (0) |
| Queens University of Charlotte | Royals | Charlotte | North Carolina | Atlantic Sun Conference | | 2004 (Div. 1 in 2023) | (5) (Div II): 2016, 2017, 2019, 2021, 2022 | (0) | (0) |
| Quinnipiac University | Bobcats | Hamden | Connecticut | Metro Conference | | 2001 | (0) | (0) | (0) |
| Radford University | Highlanders | Radford | Virginia | Big South Conference | | 2016 | (0) | (0) | (0) |
| University of Rhode Island | Rams | Kingston | Rhode Island | Atlantic 10 Conference | | 2025 | (0) | (0) | (0) |
| University of Richmond | Spiders | Richmond | Virginia | Atlantic 10 Conference | | 1983 | (7) 2005, 2006, 2007, 2018, 2019, 2023, 2024 | (0) | (0) |
| Rider University | Broncs | Lawrenceville | New Jersey | Metro Conference | | 2024 | (0) | (0) | (0) |
| Robert Morris University | Colonials | Moon Township | Pennsylvania | Mid-American Conference | Horizon League | 2005 | (1) 2021, 2024 | (0) | (0) |
| Rutgers University–New Brunswick (Rutgers) | Scarlet Knights | Piscataway | New Jersey | Big Ten Conference | | 1977 | (4) 1999, 2021, 2022, 2026 | (0) | (0) |
| Sacred Heart University | Pioneers | Fairfield | Connecticut | Metro Conference | | 1993 | (4) 2008, 2009, 2010, 2023 | (0) | (0) |
| St. Bonaventure University | Bonnies | St. Bonaventure | New York | Atlantic 10 Conference | | 2000 | (0) | (0) | (0) |
| Saint Joseph's University | Hawks | Philadelphia | Pennsylvania | Atlantic 10 Conference | | 1993 | (0) | (0) | (0) |
| San Diego State University | Aztecs | San Diego | California | Big 12 Conference | Pac-12 Conference | 2012 | (0) | (0) | (0) |
| Siena University | Saints | Loudonville | New York | Metro Conference | | 1997 | (0) | (0) | (0) |
| University of South Florida | Bulls | Tampa | Florida | American Conference | | 2025 | (0) | (0) | (0) |
| Stanford University | Cardinal | Stanford | California | Atlantic Coast Conference | | 1995 | (15) 2006, 2010, 2011, 2013, 2014, 2015, 2016, 2018, 2019, 2021, 2022, 2023, 2024, 2025, 2026 | (0) | (0) |
| Stetson University | Hatters | DeLand | Florida | Atlantic Sun Conference | | 2013 | (0) | (0) | (0) |
| Stonehill College | Skyhawks | Easton | Massachusetts | NEC | | 2004 (Div. 1 in 2023) | (1) 2026 | (0) | (0) |
| Stony Brook University | Seawolves | Stony Brook | New York | Coastal Athletic Association | | 2003 | (13) 2013, 2014, 2015, 2016, 2017, 2018, 2019, 2021, 2022, 2023, 2024, 2025, 2026 | (0) | (0) |
| Syracuse University | Orange | Syracuse | New York | Atlantic Coast Conference | | 1998 | (23) 2000, 2001, 2002, 2003, 2005, 2007, 2008, 2009, 2010, 2012, 2013, 2014, 2015, 2016, 2017, 2018, 2019, 2021, 2022, 2023, 2024, 2025, 2026 | (0) | (0) |
| Temple University | Owls | Philadelphia | Pennsylvania | American Conference | | 1975 | (17) 1983, 1984, 1985, 1986, 1987, 1988, 1989, 1990, 1992, 1995, 1997, 1998, 2001, 2002, 2003, 2004, 2008 | (2) 1984, 1988 | (1) (AIAW Div. I): 1982 |
| Towson University | Tigers | Towson | Maryland | Coastal Athletic Association | | 1977 (Div. I in 1983) | (11) 2005, 2008, 2009, 2010, 2012, 2013, 2014, 2016, 2017, 2018, 2021 | (0) | (0) |
| University of California, Davis (UC Davis) | Aggies | Davis | California | Big 12 Conference | Mountain West Conference | 1997 | (0) | (0) | (0) |
| University of Connecticut (UConn) | Huskies | Storrs | Connecticut | Big East Conference | | 1997 | (1) 2013 | (0) | (0) |
| University of Massachusetts Amherst (UMass) | Minutewomen | Amherst | Massachusetts | Mid-American Conference | | 1976 | (12) 1982, 1983, 1984, 2009, 2011, 2012, 2013, 2014, 2015, 2016, 2017, 2021, 2022, 2023, 2025, 2026 | (1) 1982 | (0) |
| University of Massachusetts Lowell (UMass Lowell) | River Hawks | Lowell | Massachusetts | America East Conference | | 2015 | (0) | (0) | (0) |
| University of Maryland, Baltimore County (UMBC) | Retrievers | Catonsville | Maryland | America East Conference | | 1973 (Div. I in 1987) | (3) 1999, 2002, 2003 | (0) | (0) |
| University of Southern California (USC) | Trojans | Los Angeles | California | Big Ten Conference | | 2013 | (6) 2015, 2016, 2017, 2019, 2022, 2023 | (0) | (0) |
| Vanderbilt University | Commodores | Nashville | Tennessee | American Conference | Southeastern Conference | 1996 | (7) 2002, 2004, 2007, 2008, 2009, 2010, 2021 | (0) | (0) |
| Virginia Commonwealth University (VCU) | Rams | Richmond | Virginia | Atlantic 10 Conference | | 2016 | (0) | (0) | (0) |
| University of Vermont | Catamounts | Burlington | Vermont | America East Conference | | 1982 | (0) | (0) | (0) |
| Villanova University | Wildcats | Villanova | Pennsylvania | Big East Conference | | 1991 | (0) | (0) | (0) |
| University of Virginia | Cavaliers | Charlottesville | Virginia | Atlantic Coast Conference | | 1976 | (37) 1986, 1987, 1989, 1990, 1991, 1992, 1993, 1994, 1996, 1997, 1998, 1999, 2000, 2001, 2002, 2003, 2004, 2005, 2006, 2007, 2008, 2009, 2010, 2011, 2012, 2013, 2014, 2015, 2016, 2017, 2018, 2019, 2021, 2022, 2023, 2024, 2025 | (3) 1991, 1993, 2004 | (0) |
| Virginia Polytechnic Institute and State University (Virginia Tech) | Hokies | Blacksburg | Virginia | Atlantic Coast Conference | | 1995 | (1) 2018 | (0) | (0) |
| Wagner College | Seahawks | Staten Island | New York | NEC | | 1997 | (3) 2016, 2018, 2019 | (0) | (0) |
| College of William & Mary | Tribe | Williamsburg | Virginia | Coastal Athletic Association | | 1970 | (7) 1983, 1988, 1994, 1996, 1997, 1998, 2001 | (0) | (0) |
| Winthrop University | Eagles | Rock Hill | South Carolina | Big South Conference | | 2013 | (2) 2015, 2016 | (0) | (0) |
| Wofford College | Terriers | Spartanburg | South Carolina | Big South Conference | Southern Conference | 2018 | (0) | (0) | (0) |
| Xavier University | Musketeers | Cincinnati | Ohio | Big East Conference | | 2023 | (0) | (0) | (0) |
| Yale University | Bulldogs | New Haven | Connecticut | Ivy League | | 1976 | (6) 1984, 2003, 2007, 2024, 2025, 2026 | (0) | (0) |
| Youngstown State University | Penguins | Youngstown | Ohio | Mid-American Conference | Horizon League | 2021 | (0) | (0) | (0) |

== See also ==
- NCAA Division I men's lacrosse tournament all-time team records
- NCAA Division I men's lacrosse tournament appearances by school
- NCAA Division I men's lacrosse tournament
- NCAA Division I women's lacrosse tournament
- College lacrosse
- List of NCAA Division II lacrosse programs
- NAIA lacrosse
