= 2014 MAAC Men's Lacrosse Tournament =

The 2014 MAAC Men's Lacrosse Championship took place from April 1 to May 3 that year at Tenney Stadium in Poughkeepsie, New York, United States. The winner of the tournament received the Metro Atlantic Athletic Conference's automatic bid to the 2014 NCAA Division I Men's Lacrosse Championship. Four teams from the MAAC conference will compete in the single elimination tournament. The seeds were based upon the teams' regular season conference record.

== Standings ==
Only the top four teams in the Metro Atlantic Athletic conference advanced to the MAAC Conference Tournament.

Seed	School	Conference	Overall	Tiebreakers
1	Siena‡*	7–0	11–6	
2	Marist*	3–3	6–9	
3	Detroit*	3–3	6–8	
4	Canisius*	3–3	7–8	
5	Quinnipiac	3–3	6–8	
6	Manhattan	3–3	5–10	
7	Monmouth	0–6	0–13	
‡ MAAC regular season champions. * Qualify for the tournament.

== Schedule ==
Session	Game	Time*	Matchup^{#}	Score	Television
Semi-finals – Thursday, May 1
1	1	4:00 pm	#2 Marist vs. #3 Detroit	11–9	MAAC.TV
1	2	7:00 pm	#1 Siena vs. #4 Canisius	14–11	MAAC.TV
Championship – Saturday, May 3
2	3	11:00am	#1 Siena vs. #2 Marist	11–7	ESPN 3
*Game times in EST. #–Rankings denote tournament seeding.

== Bracket ==
Tenney Stadium – Poughkeepsie, New York

Semifinals; May 1
1	Siena	14
4	Canisius	11
2	Marist	11
3	Detroit	9

Championship Game; May 3
1	Siena	11
2	Marist	7

- denotes an overtime game

== All-Tournament ==
Tim Edwards, Canisius

Nick Tuttle, Canisius

Shayne Adams, Detroit

Alex Maini, Detroit

Gannon Osborn, Marist

Dave Scarcello, Marist

Jordan Barlow, Siena

Colin Clive, Siena

Kyle Curry, Siena

Most Outstanding Player

Tommy Cordts, Siena
