= 2022 Mount St. Mary's Mountaineers men's lacrosse team =

American college lacrosse season

2022 Mount St. Mary's Mountaineers men's lacrosse
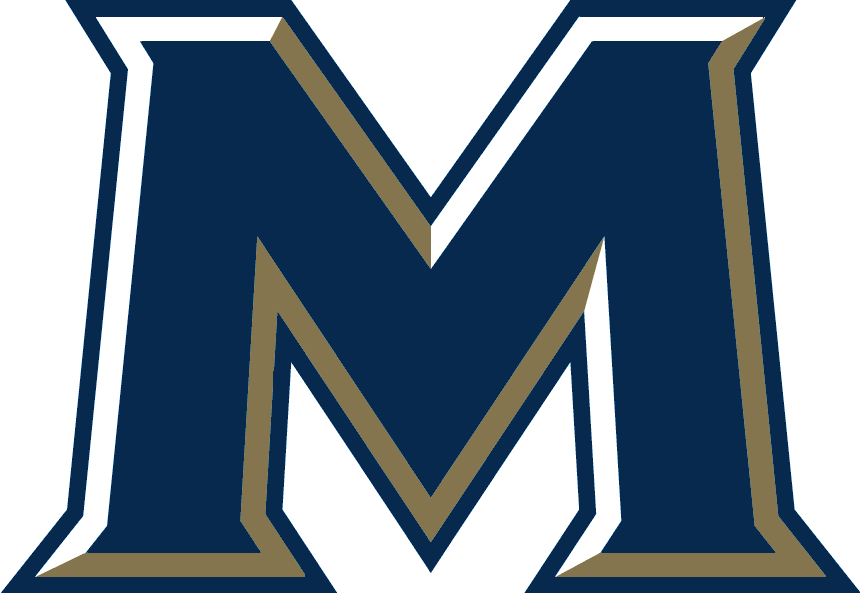
- Conference: Northeast Conference
- Record: 5–10 (2–5 NEC)
- Head coach: Tom Gravante (25th season)
- Assistant coaches: Kevin Giblin; Nick Kellinger; Ted Moon
- Captains: Noah Daniels; Kadin Kightlinger; Connor McMahon; Jared McMahon
- Home stadium: Waldron Family Stadium

Mount St. Mary's Mountaineers head coach Tom Gravante was assisted by coaches Kevin Giblin, Nick Kellinger, and Ted Moon. Jared McMahon, Connor McMahon, Kadin Kightlinger, and Noah Daniels served as team captains. 2021 team leaders Luke Frankeny, Bryan McIntosh, and Sam Stephen transferred to other programs prior to the season.

The Mountaineers registered their first win over Navy in program history with the season opener. Goalie Griffin McGinley earned USA Lacrosse Player of the Week, NEC Defensive Player of the Week, and Lacrosse Bucket Team of the Week honors, while attackman Cormac Giblin earned NEC Player of the Week honors. Senior goalie Gunnar Luckoski earned NEC Defensive Player of the Week honors, and was named an NEC Prime Performer along with sophomore face off specialist Connor Beals and graduate attackman Brendan Lantieri after the Mount's 9–5 win over Wagner College. With a 5–10 regular season record, Mount St. Mary's failed to qualify for the NEC playoffs.

At the conclusion of the season, Daniels earned United States Intercollegiate Lacrosse Association's Scholar All-American honors and Giblin was inducted into the National Interscholastic Lacrosse Coaches Association Hall of Fame.

== Roster ==
Last Name	First Name	Class	Num.	Position
Allen	Colin	Graduate	7	Defensive Midfielder
Barrett	Connor	Freshman	18	Midfielder
Bauer	Jack	Junior	2	Midfielder
Baughan	Cal	Senior	44	Midfielder
Beals	Connor	Sophomore	8	Face Off Specialist
Beausoleil	Armond	Sophomore	29	Defensive Midfielder
Benoit	Nick	Senior	24	Long Stick Midfielder
Bradley	Brian	Freshman	11	Defensive Midfielder
Bradley†	Dan	Junior	31	Defensive Midfielder
Cote	Caden	Junior	9	Defensive Midfielder
Cullen	Kyle	Sophomore	22	Midfielder
Daniels	Noah	Senior	21	Defensive Midfielder
Decrispino	Kyle	Senior	1	Attackman
Domanski	Casey	Sophomore	39	Midfielder
Dunham	Mitchell	Sophomore	17	Defenseman
Giblin	Cormac	Junior	42	Attackman
Gigliotti II	Edward	Sophomore	15	Attackman
Gouin	Kelly	Senior	27	Midfielder
Holobinko	Ethan	Sophomore	51	Face Off Specialist
Janiec	Evan	Senior	20	Long Stick Midfielder
Kightlinger	Kadin	Graduate	16	Midfielder
Krasnick	Nolan	Sophomore	3	Midfielder
Krieger	Jake	Senior	14	Midfielder
Lantieri	Brendan	Graduate	4	Attackman
Leonard	Cooper	Sophomore	53	Face Off Specialist
Luckoski	Gunnar	Graduate	55	Goalie
McGinley	Griffin	Sophomore	23	Goalie
McMahon	Connor	Senior	6	Midfielder
McMahon	Jared	Senior	12	Attackman
Merchant	Nathanael	Freshman	36	Defensive Midfielder
Miller IV†	John	Freshman	5	Defensive Midfielder
Moses	Moran	Junior	50	Defenseman
Nelson	Mekai	Freshman	41	Long Stick Midfielder
Niehaus	Thomas	Freshman	25	Midfielder
Pershing	Noah	Junior	49	Attackman
Phillips	Jackson	Sophomore	19	Defenseman
Pippen	William	Sophomore	34	Defenseman
Preston	Andrew	Junior	37	Goalie
Roth	Luke	Senior	52	Defenseman
Schmitt	Steven	Junior	32	Long Stick Midfielder
Smith	C.W.	Sophomore	54	Defenseman
Smith	Tyler	Junior	33	Midfielder
Summer	Sammy	Sophomore	47	Defenseman
Ward	Ben	Junior	30	Defenseman
Wieck	Justin	Senior	10	Attackman
Wilson	Jeremy	Senior	13	Attackman
Wright	Jake	Junior	38	Defenseman

† = Inactive Due to Injury

== Transfers ==
Last Name	First Name	Class	Transfer	
Last Name	First Name	Class	From	To
Bauer	Jack	Freshman	Harford Community College	Mount St. Mary's University
Frankeny	Luke	Grad	Mount St. Mary's University	University of Richmond
McIntosh	Bryan	Grad	Mount St. Mary's University	Hofstra University
Stephan	Sam	Grad	Mount St. Mary's University	Rutgers University

== Schedule ==
Date	Time (EST)	Pairing	Opponent	Location	Broadcast	Result	Score
October 17	10:00 am	SC	St. Bonaventure University	Away		N/A	N/A
October 17	12:30 pm	SC	Bellarmine University	Away		N/A	N/A
January 29	10:00 am	SC	High Point University	Away		N/A	N/A
January 29	12:30 pm	SC	University of North Carolina	Away		N/A	N/A
February 5	12:00 pm	NC	U.S. Naval Academy	Away	ESPN+	Win	11–9
February 12	2:00 pm	NC	University of Delaware	Away	FloSports	Loss	6–12
February 15	4:00 pm	NC	Towson University	Away	FloSports	Loss	8–13
February 19	1:00 pm	NC	Hampton University	Home	NEC Front Row	Win	17–5
February 25	3:00 pm	NC	University of Maryland, Baltimore County	Home	NEC Front Row	Win	9–8
March 1	3:00 pm	NC	Georgetown University	Away	FloSports	Loss	4–21
March 4	3:00 pm	NC	Virginia Military Institute	Home	NEC Front Row	Loss	7–8
March 10	3:00 pm	NC	Mercer University	Home	NEC Front Row	Loss	11–12
March 19	12:00 pm	NEC	Saint Joseph's University	Away	NEC Front Row	Loss	6–19
March 26	12:00 pm	NEC	Sacred Heart University	Away	NEC Front Row	Win	14–13
April 2	1:00 pm	NEC	Merrimack College	Away	NEC Front Row	Loss	9–14
April 9	12:00 pm	NEC	Long Island University	Home	NEC Front Row	Loss	10–14
April 16	12:00 pm	NEC	Wagner University	Away	NEC Front Row	Win	9–5
April 23	12:00 pm	NEC	Bryant University	Home	NEC Front Row	Loss	7–14
April 30	2:00 pm	NEC	Hobart University	Away	HWS Athletics	Loss	7–14

Pairings: SC = Scrimmage; NC = Non-conference; NEC = Conference; CT = Conference Tournament
