= Holy Trinity Diocesan High School =

- Home of the Titans
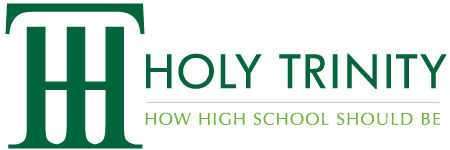

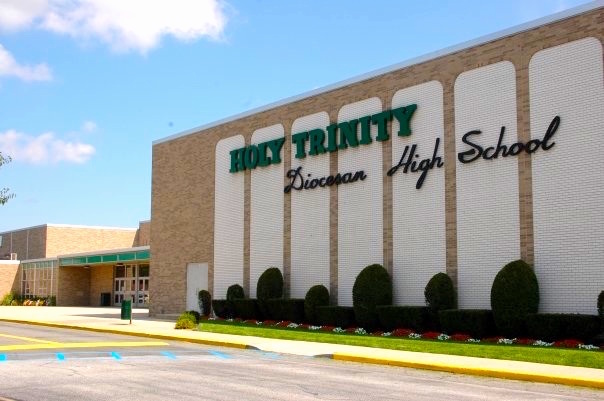
- Front of Holy Trinity Diocesan High School

Location
- 98 Cherry Lane; Hicksville, Nassau, New York 11801; 40°44′48″N 73°31′57″W

Information
- Type: Coeducational
- Motto: A Special Time, Place and Spirit
- Religious affiliations: Roman Catholic; Diocesan
- Established: 1966
- School code: 690
- Principal: Jim Grillo
- Faculty: ~90
- Grades: 9-12
- Enrollment: 1300 (2013)
- Average class size: 25–28
- Campus: Suburban
- Colors: Green and White
- Slogan: "How High School Should Be"
- Athletics: 2013 - 2014 CHSAA AA State Champions Basketball 2x CHSAA Class A Intersectional Champions Lacrosse (2015–16, 2016–17) CHSAA Class AA 2nd place Football (2016–17)
- Athletics conference: Catholic AAA
- Mascot: The Titan
- Team name: Titans
- Accreditation: Middle States Association of Colleges and Schools
- Newspaper: Trinity Triangle
- Yearbook: Tribute
- Tuition: $11,000 (2018–2019)
- Enrollment Exam: C.H.S.E.E
- Diocese: Diocese of Rockville Centre
- Website: holytrinityhs.org

Holy Trinity High School is a co-educational learning environment located centrally in Hicksville, Nassau County, New York on Long Island. Education is based on New York State Education Standards with a strong emphasis on Religious Studies. It is operated by the Roman Catholic Diocese of Rockville Centre.

== Performing Arts program ==
The Performing Arts program offers the arts as part of the curriculum towards either Regents or Honors diplomas. Students study dance and theater (or band) in place of gym and visual arts, with one year of theater arts substituted for choir. In the early 2000s, Holy Trinity put on the first high school production of Les Misérables in the world.

The athletic camps run for kids in grades 3 or 4 through high school.

== Notable alumni ==
- Ryan Colucci - film producer/director
- Kevin Conry - head coach men's lacrosse University of Michigan
- Shana Cox – track and field sprinter
- Tim Dillon - Comedian
- Matt Doherty – men's college basketball coach
- Tom Junod (1976) – journalist
- Ralph Perretta – professional NFL player
- Maurice Richardson - NBA Employee & Video Editor
- Jean Shafiroff – philanthropist and socialite
- Jenna Ushkowitz – cast member of Glee
