= 2014 NCAA Division I men's lacrosse tournament =

- Teams: 18
- Finals site: M&T Bank Stadium, Baltimore, MD
- Champions: Duke Blue Devils (3rd title)
- Runner-up: Notre Dame Fighting Irish (2nd title game)
- Semifinalists: Maryland Terrapins (22nd Final Four); Denver Pioneers (3rd Final Four)
- Winning coach: John Danowski (3rd title)
- MOP: Jordan Wolf, Duke
- Attendance: 30,428 semi-finals 25,587 finals 56,015 total
- Top scorer: Jordan Wolf, Duke (13 goals)

The 2014 NCAA Division I Men's Lacrosse Championship was the 44th annual single-elimination tournament to determine the national championship for National Collegiate Athletic Association (NCAA) Division I men's college lacrosse. Eighteen teams competed in the tournament, selected by winning an automatic qualifying conference tournament or as an at-large bid based upon their performance during the regular season. The Divisions I men’s lacrosse committees announced the teams in the field on May 4, 2014.

== Tournament overview ==
The tournament started on May 7, 2014 with two play-in games that were played on campus sites. The winners of the games, Bryant and Air Force, advanced onto the first round of the tournament. The tournament concluded with the championship game on May 29 at M&T Bank Stadium in Baltimore.

Schools from ten conferences, America East, ACC, Atlantic Sun, Big East, CAA, ECAC, Ivy League, MAAC, NEC, and Patriot League, earned automatic bids into the tournament by winning their respective conference tournaments, leaving eight remaining at-large bids for top ranked teams. Air Force (ECAC), Albany (America East), Bryant (NEC), Denver (Big East), Drexel (CAA), Loyola (Patriot), Notre Dame (ACC), Penn (Ivy), Richmond (Atlantic Sun), and Siena (MAAC), were the schools that claimed automatic bids.

In the finals, with Duke leading 8–2 in the third quarter, Notre Dame put together a comeback narrowing the margin to one with five minutes left in the game. Tewaaraton finalist Jordan Wolf closed out the title for Duke with an empty net goal with under a minute left. This was Duke's second straight title, their 3rd title in the prior five years, and their 8th straight final four appearance.

There were several first round upsets, the most notable being Bryant and Drexel winning their first-ever NCAA tournament games, with Bryant upsetting second seeded Syracuse.

== Teams ==
| Seed | School | Conference | Berth Type | RPI | Record |
|---|---|---|---|---|---|
| 1 | Duke | ACC | At-large | 3 | 13–3 |
| 2 | Syracuse | ACC | At-large | 1 | 11–4 |
| 3 | Loyola | Patriot | Automatic | 4 | 15–1 |
| 4 | Penn | Ivy | Automatic | 2 | 11–3 |
| 5 | Denver | Big East | Automatic | 7 | 14–2 |
| 6 | Notre Dame | ACC | Automatic | 5 | 9–5 |
| 7 | Maryland | ACC | At-large | 9 | 11–3 |
| 8 | Virginia | ACC | At-large | 6 | 10–5 |
| | Cornell | Ivy | At-large | 8 | 11–4 |
| | North Carolina | ACC | At-large | 10 | 10–4 |
| | Drexel | CAA | Automatic | 11 | 12–4 |
| | Johns Hopkins | Independent | At-large | 12 | 10–4 |
| | Albany | America East | Automatic | 13 | 11–5 |
| | Harvard | Ivy | At-large | 16 | 10–6 |
| | Bryant | NEC | Automatic | 22 | 14–4 |
| | Siena | MAAC | Automatic | 27 | 11–5 |
| | Air Force | ECAC | Automatic | 28 | 10–5 |
| | Richmond | Atlantic Sun | Automatic | 54 | 6–10 |

== Bracket ==
| Play-in game May 7 |
| Air Force | 13 |
| Richmond | 5 |

| Play-in game May 7 |
| Bryant | 9 |
| Siena | 8 |

First Round; May 10–11
1 | Duke | 20
Air Force | 9
8 | Virginia | 8
Johns Hopkins | 14
4 | Penn | 11
Drexel | 16
5 | Denver | 9
North Carolina | 5
3 | Loyola | 6
Albany | 13
6 | Notre Dame | 13
Harvard | 5
7 | Maryland | 8
Cornell | 7
2 | Syracuse | 9
Bryant | 10

Quarterfinals; May 17–18; Delaware Stadium; James M. Shuart Stadium
1 | Duke | 19
Johns Hopkins | 11
Drexel | 6
5 | Denver | 15
Albany | 13
6 | Notre Dame | 14*
7 | Maryland | 16
Bryant | 8

Semifinals; May 24; M&T Bank Stadium
1 | Duke | 15
5 | Denver | 12
6 | Notre Dame | 11
7 | Maryland | 6

Final; May 26; M&T Bank Stadium
1 | Duke | 11
6 | Notre Dame | 9

* = One Overtime

== Tournament boxscores ==
Tournament Finals

| Team | 1 | 2 | 3 | 4 | Total |
|---|---|---|---|---|---|
| Duke | 2 | 3 | 3 | 3 | 11 |
| Notre Dame (12–6) | 0 | 1 | 3 | 5 | 9 |
Duke scoring – Jordan Wolf 2, Myles Jones 2, Kyle Keenan 2, Deemer Class 2, Christian Walsh, Thomas Zenker, Will Haus; Notre Dame scoring – Sergio Perkovic 5, Matt Kavanagh 2, John Scioscia, Ben Pridemore; Shots: Duke 36, Notre Dame 32; Saves: Notre Dame – Conor Kelly 12; Duke – Luke Aaron 9

Tournament Semi-Finals

| Team | 1 | 2 | 3 | 4 | Total |
|---|---|---|---|---|---|
| Duke | 3 | 5 | 3 | 4 | 15 |
| Denver (16–3) | 2 | 2 | 5 | 3 | 12 |
Duke scoring – Kyle Keenan 4, Jordan Wolf 3, Deemer Class 3, Myles Jones 2, Chad Cohan 2, Christian Walsh; Denver scoring – Wesley Berg 5, Tyler Pace 3, Jack Bobzien 3, Zach Miller; Shots: Duke – 38, Denver – 36; Saves: Denver – Ryan LaPlante 5, Jamie Faus 4; Duke – Kyle Turri 4, Luke Aaron 3

| Team | 1 | 2 | 3 | 4 | Total |
|---|---|---|---|---|---|
| Notre Dame | 4 | 2 | 4 | 1 | 11 |
| Maryland (13–4) | 2 | 2 | 1 | 1 | 6 |
Notre Dame scoring – Matt Kavanagh 5, Nick Ossello 2, John Scioscia 2, Conor Doyle, Pat Cotter; Maryland scoring – Joe LoCascio 2, Mike Chanenchuk, Connor Cannizzaro, Jay Carlson, Henry West; Shots: Maryland – 38, Notre Dame – 34; Saves: Notre Dame – Conor Kelly 14; Maryland – Niko Amato 10

Tournament Quarterfinals

| Team | 1 | 2 | 3 | 4 | Total |
|---|---|---|---|---|---|
| Duke | 7 | 5 | 2 | 5 | 19 |
| Johns Hopkins (11–5) | 3 | 5 | 2 | 1 | 11 |
Duke scoring – Jordan Wolf 5, Josh Dionne 4, Myles Jones 3, Case Matheis 3, Christian Walsh 2, Kyle Keenan 2; Johns Hopkins scoring – Rob Guida 3, Holden Cattoni 3, Connor Reed, Wells Stanwick, Ryan Brown, Brandon Benn, John Crawley; Shots: Duke – 44, Johns Hopkins – 35; Saves: Johns Hopkins – Eric Schneider 10; Duke – Luke Aaron 3, Kyle Turri 1

| Team | 1 | 2 | 3 | 4 | Total |
|---|---|---|---|---|---|
| Denver | 5 | 5 | 4 | 1 | 15 |
| Drexel (13–5) | 3 | 0 | 2 | 1 | 6 |
Denver scoring – Erik Adamson 6, Harrison Archer 2, Zach Miller 2, Tyler Pace, Wesley Berg, Dallas Bridle, Jeremy Noble, Colin Woolford; Drexel scoring – Ben McIntosh 2, Nick Trizano 2, Jules Raucci, Nick Saputo; Shots: Denver – 32, Drexel – 28; Saves: Denver – Jamie Faus 8, Ryan laplante 3; Drexel – Will Gabrielsen 9

| Team | 1 | 2 | 3 | 4 | Total |
|---|---|---|---|---|---|
| Notre Dame | 3 | 5 | 3 | 4 | 15 |
| Albany (12–6) | 2 | 2 | 5 | 3 | 12 |
Notre Dame scoring – Matt Kavanagh 3, Conor Doyle 2, John Scioscia 2, Sergio Perkovic 2, Nick Ossello 2, Westy Hopkins 2, Trevor Brosco; Albany scoring – Lyle Thompson 3, Miles Thompson 3, Ty Thompson 2, Doug Eich, Ryan Feuerstein, Matthew Bertrams, John Maloney, Will Stenberg; Shots: Notre Dame – 47, Albany – 32; Saves: Albany – Blaze Riorden 14; Notre Dame – Conor Kelly 6

| Team | 1 | 2 | 3 | 4 | Total |
|---|---|---|---|---|---|
| Maryland | 7 | 2 | 5 | 2 | 16 |
| Bryant (16–5) | 2 | 2 | 2 | 2 | 8 |
Maryland scoring – Mike Chanenchuk 5, Joe LoCascio 3, Connor Cannizzaro 3, Jay Carlson 3, Matt Rambo, Henry West; Bryant scoring – Colin Dunster 4, Shane Morrell 2, Tucker James, Dan Sipperly; Shots: Maryland – 38, Bryant – 29; Saves: Bryant – Gunnar Waldt 7, - Niko Dutra 1; Maryland – Nike Amato 6

Tournament First Round

| Team | 1 | 2 | 3 | 4 | Total |
|---|---|---|---|---|---|
| Duke | 3 | 4 | 4 | 5 | 20 |
| Air Force | 4 | 2 | 1 | 4 | 9 |
Duke scoring – Myles Jones 3, Case Matheis 3, Jordan Wolf 3, Deemer Class 2, Josh Dionne 2, Will Haus 2, Kyle Keenan 2, Jack Bruckner 2, Seamus Connelly; Air Force scoring – Kyle Cassady 3, Mike Crampton 3, Tommy McKee 2, Erik Smith; Shots: Duke 45, Air Force 34

| Team | 1 | 2 | 3 | 4 | Total |
|---|---|---|---|---|---|
| Johns Hopkins | 3 | 4 | 4 | 5 | 14 |
| Virginia | 4 | 2 | 1 | 4 | 9 |
Johns Hopkins scoring – Wells Stanwick 5, Brandon Benn 4, Connor Reed, Holden Cattoni, Kevin Interlicchio, Jack Reilly, Ryan Brown; Virginia scoring – Mark Cockerton 2, Ryan Tucker, Owen Van Arsdale, Pat Harbeson, Tyler German, Zed Williams, Joseph Lisicky; Shots: Johns Hopkins 45, Virginia 34

| Team | 1 | 2 | 3 | 4 | Total |
|---|---|---|---|---|---|
| Drexel | 3 | 4 | 4 | 5 | 16 |
| Penn | 4 | 2 | 1 | 4 | 11 |
Drexel scoring – Ben McIntosh 3, Nick Saputo 3, Ryan Belka 2, Jared Boudreau 2, Jules Raucci 2, Nick Trizano 2, Hank Brown, Chris Frederick; Penn scoring – Nick Doktor 3, Pat Berkery, Isaac Bock, Drew Belinsky, Zack Losco, Chris Hilburn, Joe McCallion, Alex Blonsky, Kevin Brown; Shots: Penn 47, Drexel 45; Saves: Drexel 12, Penn 10

| Team | 1 | 2 | 3 | 4 | Total |
|---|---|---|---|---|---|
| Denver | 2 | 2 | 1 | 5 | 9 |
| North Carolina | 1 | 0 | 0 | 0 | 5 |
Denver scoring – Erik Adamson 2, Zach Miller 2, Jeremy Noble, Jack Bobzein, Wesley Berg, Dallas Bridle, Sean Cannizzarro; North Carolina scoring – Thomas Dour; Shots: Denver 41, North Carolina 16

| Team | 1 | 2 | 3 | 4 | Total |
|---|---|---|---|---|---|
| Albany | 3 | 4 | 2 | 4 | 13 |
| Loyola | 1 | 2 | 2 | 1 | 6 |
Albany scoring – Miles Thompson 5, Lyle Thompson 3, Ty Thompson 3, Jon Newhouse 1, Will Stenberg 1; Loyola scoring – Justin Ward 2, Pat Laconi 2, Nikko Pontrello 1, Romar Dennis 1; Shots: Albany 44, Loyola 41

| Team | 1 | 2 | 3 | 4 | Total |
|---|---|---|---|---|---|
| Notre Dame | 3 | 4 | 1 | 5 | 13 |
| Harvard | 1 | 0 | 0 | 0 | 5 |
Notre Dame scoring – John Scioscia 4, Sergio Perkovic 2, Conor Doyle 2, Matt Kavanaugh 2, Will Corrigan, Jack Near, Bobby Gray; Harvard scoring – Thomas Dour; Shots: Notre Dame 41, Harvard 16

| Team | 1 | 2 | 3 | 4 | Total |
|---|---|---|---|---|---|
| Maryland | 3 | 4 | 1 | 5 | 13 |
| Harvard | 1 | 0 | 0 | 0 | 5 |
Notre Dame scoring – John Scioscia 4, Sergio Perkovic 2, Conor Doyle 2, Matt Kavanaugh 2, Will Corrigan, Jack Near, Bobby Gray; Harvard scoring – Thomas Dour; Shots: Notre Dame 41, Harvard 16

| Team | 1 | 2 | 3 | 4 | Total |
|---|---|---|---|---|---|
| Bryant | 3 | 4 | 1 | 5 | 10 |
| Syracuse | 1 | 0 | 0 | 0 | 9 |
Notre Dame scoring – John Scioscia 4, Sergio Perkovic 2, Conor Doyle 2, Matt Kavanaugh 2, Will Corrigan, Jack Near, Bobby Gray; Harvard scoring – Thomas Dour; Shots: Notre Dame 41, Harvard 16

== All-Tournament ==
- Jordan Wolf, A, Duke (Most Outstanding Player)
- Henry Lobb, D, Duke
- Kyle Keenan, A, Duke
- Myles Jones, M, Duke
- Will Haus, M, Duke
- Deemer Class, A, Duke
- Sergio Perkovic, M, Notre Dame
- Conor Kelly, G, Notre Dame
- Matt Kavanagh, A, Notre Dame
- Wesley Berg, A, Denver
