= 2023 Mount St. Mary's Mountaineers men's lacrosse team =

American college lacrosse season

2023 Mount St. Mary's Mountaineers men's lacrosse
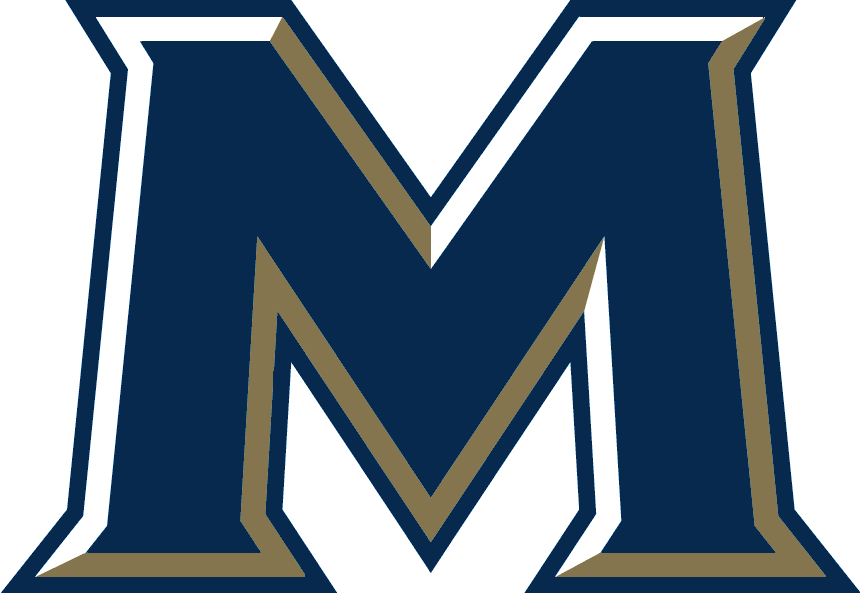
- Conference: Metro Atlantic Athletic Conference
- Record: 8-8 (7-2 MAAC)
- Head coach: Tom Gravante (26th season)
- Assistant coaches: Kevin Giblin; Nick Kellinger; Ted Moon
- Captains: Dan Bradley; Cormac Giblin; Jared McMahon; Ben Ward
- Home stadium: Waldron Family Stadium

Mount St. Mary's Mountaineers head coach Tom Gravante was assisted by coaches Kevin Giblin, Nick Kellinger, and Ted Moon. Cormac Giblin, Dan Bradley, Jared McMahon, and Ben Ward served as team captains. 2022 team captains Noah Daniels and Connor McMahon transferred to other programs prior to the season.

The Mount earned a regular season MAAC co-championship with Manhattan College. Connor Beals was named MAAC Face-off Specialist of the Year; Steven Schmitt was named MAAC Long Stick Midfielder of the Year; Mitchell Dunham was named MAAC Defensive Player of the Year; and TJ Gravante was named MAAC Rookie of the Year. Beals, Schmitt, and Dunham, along with Jared McMahon and Jake Krieger earned MAAC First Team Honors. Jackson Phillips earned MAAC Second Team honors. Gravante earned MAAC Rookie Team honors.

Giblin and Moon resigned after the Mount's MAAC tournament loss to Marist. Giblin took the position of principal at St. Bartholomew's Middle School in Bethesda, Maryland. Moon, who coached Beals to a record setting season at face off, founded SVP Face Off and joined the Georgetown coaching staff. Kellinger joined the UMBC coaching staff.

The Mount dismissed Gravante, ending his 26-year tenure, and hired Chris Ryan to replace Gravante, becoming the 6th head coach in program history. Bucknell hired Gravante as an assist coach for the 2024 season.

== Roster ==
Last Name	First Name	Class	Num.	Position
Allen	Colin	Graduate	7	Defensive Midfielder
Anger	Klaus	Freshman	54	Face Off Specialist
Barrett	Connor	Sophomore	18	Attackman
Bauer	Jack	Senior	2	Midfielder
Baxter	Kyle	Freshman	53	Defenseman
Beals	Connor	Senior	20	Face Off Specialist
Beausoleil	Armond	Junior	29	Defensive Midfielder
Bradley	Brian	Sophomore	11	Defensive Midfielder
Bradley	Dan	Senior	31	Defensive Midfielder
Catello	Grant	Freshman	43	Defenseman
Cavalier	Chase	Freshman	10	Midfielder
Coldwell	Jake	Freshman	28	Defenseman
Connelly	Sean	Freshman	26	Long Stick Midfielder
Cote	Caden	Senior	9	Defensive Midfielder
Cullen	Kyle	Junior	22	Midfielder
Dismukes	Jimmy	Freshman	6	Midfielder
Domanski	Casey	Junior	39	Midfielder
Doyle	Kevin	Sophomore	27	Defenseman
Dunham	Mitchell	Junior	17	Defenseman
Fuchs	Carson	Freshman	4	Attackman
Giblin	Cormac	Senior	42	Attackman
Gigliotti II	Edward	Junior	15	Attackman
Gouin	Kelly	Graduate	24	Midfielder
Gravante	TJ	Freshman	21	Attackman
Holobinko	Ethan	Junior	51	Face Off Specialist
Krasnick	Nolan	Junior	3	Midfielder
Krieger	Jake	Graduate	14	Midfielder
Levicki	Nate	Freshman	45	Long Stick Midfielder
McGinley	Griffin	Junior	23	Goalie
McMahon	Jared	Graduate	1	Attackman
Merchant	Nathanael	Sophomore	36	Defensive Midfielder
Miller IV	John	Freshman	5	Midfielder
Moses	Moran	Senior	50	Defenseman
Mullins	Jaden	Freshman	16	Defensive Midfielder
Nelson	Mekai	Sophomore	41	Long Stick Midfielder
Niehaus	Thomas	Sophomore	25	Midfielder
Pershing	Noah	Senior	49	Midfielder
Peters	Owen	Freshman	55	Goalie
Phillips	Jackson	Junior	19	Defenseman
Pilla	Jack	Freshman	46	Attackman
Pippen	William	Junior	34	Long Stick Midfielder
Plott	Ian	Freshman	47	Attackman
Preston	Andrew	Senior	37	Goalie
Roth	Luke	Graduate	52	Defenseman
Sardo	Matt	Freshman	48	Defensive Midfielder
Schaffer	Gavin	Freshman	8	Midfielder
Schmitt	Steven	Senior	32	Long Stick Midfielder
Smith	Tyler	Senior	33	Midfielder
Turso	Bobby	Freshman	44	Face Off Specialist
Vandergrift	Wil	Sophomore	35	Midfield
Ward	Ben	Junior	30	Defenseman
Whitty	Kevin	Freshman	40	Midfielder
Wilson	Jeremy	Graduate	13	Midfielder
Wright	Jake	Senior	38	Long Stick Midfielder

== Transfers ==
Last Name	First Name	Class	Transfer	
Last Name	First Name	Class	From	To
Daniels	Noah	Graduate Student	Mount St. Mary's University	Rutgers University
Hayburn	Jimmy	Graduate Student	Loyola University	Mount St. Mary's University
Janiec	Evan	Senior	Mount St. Mary's University	Lindenwood University
McMahon	Connor	Senior	Mount St. Mary's University	Bryant University
Vandergrift	Wil	Sophomore	Saint Joseph's University	Mount St. Mary's University

== Schedule ==
Date	Time (EST)	Pairing	Opponent	Location	Broadcast	Result	Score
October 8	12:30 PM	SC	Saint Bonaventure University	Away	N/A	N/A	N/A
October 8	2:30 PM	SC	Bucknell University	Away	N/A	N/A	N/A
January 21	12:00 PM	SC	Duke University	Away	N/A	N/A	N/A
January 21	2:00 PM	SC	Wingate University	Away	N/A	N/A	N/A
February 4	12:00 PM	NC	U.S. Naval Academy	Away	ESPN+	Loss	7–13
February 11	3:00 PM	NC	Towson University	Home	All Access	Loss	7-20
February 15	3:00 PM	NC	University of Delaware	Home	All Access	Loss	6–15
February 18	2:00 PM	NC	New Jersey Institute of Technology	Away	All Access	Win	13–10
February 25	6:00 PM	NC	University of Maryland, Baltimore County	Away	ESPN+	Loss	6–16
March 4	11:00 AM	MAAC	Monmouth University	Home	ESPN+	Loss	7-8 (OT)
March 11	12:00 PM	MAAC	Manhattan College	Home	ESPN+	Loss	3–9
March 18	12:00 PM	MAAC	Long Island University	Home	ESPN+	Win	16–13
March 25	12:00 PM	MAAC	Wagner College	Away	ESPN+	Win	10–7
March 29	4:00 PM	MAAC	Virginia Military Institute	Away	ESPN+	Win	20–5
April 1	12:00 PM	MAAC	Quinnipiac University	Home	ESPN+	Win	18–11
April 8	1:00 PM	MAAC	Marist College	Away	ESPN+	Win	12–9
April 12	3:00 PM	MAAC	Canisius University	Home	ESPN+	Win	15–13
April 15	12:00 PM	MAAC	Sacred Heart University	Away	ESPN+	Win	13–12
April 22	1:00 PM	MAAC	Siena College	Away	ESPN+	Loss	12–13
May 4	3:00 PM	CT	Marist College	Away	ESPN+	Loss	7–19

Pairings: SC = Scrimmage; NC = Non-conference; MAAC = Conference; CT = Conference Tournament
