= Kevin Conry =

American lacrosse player and coach

Current position
- Title: Head coach
- Team: Michigan
- Conference: Big Ten
- Record: 56–61 (.479)

Biographical details
- Born: November 24, 1981 (age 44); Rockville Centre, New York, U.S.
- Education: Johns Hopkins University

Playing career
- 2001–2004: Johns Hopkins

Coaching career (HC unless noted)
- 2004–2006: Siena (asst.)
- 2007: Penn State (asst.)
- 2008–2011: Fairfield (asst.)
- 2013–2017: Maryland (asst.)
- 2018–present: Michigan

Head coaching record
- Overall: 56–61 (.479)

Accomplishments and honors

Championships
- Big Ten Tournament Champions (2023, 2024)

Kevin R. Conry (born November 24, 1981) is an American lacrosse coach, who is currently the head coach of the Michigan Wolverines men's lacrosse team. He previously served as the defensive coordinator and assistant coach at Maryland, Fairfield, Penn State and Siena.

== Coaching career ==
=== Michigan ===
On June 21, 2018, Conry was named the new head coach of the Michigan Wolverines men's lacrosse program.

== Head coaching record ==
=== College ===
Record table
Season	Team	Overall	Conference	Standing	Postseason
Michigan Wolverines (Big Ten Conference) (2018–Present)
2018	Michigan	8–6	1–4	6th	
2019	Michigan	4–9	1–4	T–5th	
2020	Michigan	4–3	0–0	†	†
2021	Michigan	3–9	2–8	T–5th	
2022	Michigan	7–8	0–5	6th	
2023	Michigan	10–7	2–3	4th	NCAA Quarterfinals
2024	Michigan	10–7	2–3	4th	NCAA Division I First Round
2025	Michigan	3–5	0–0		
Michigan:		56–61 (.479)	11–29 (.275)		
Total:		56–61 (.479)			
National champion Postseason invitational champion Conference regular season champion Conference regular season and conference tournament champion Division regular season champion Division regular season and conference tournament champion Conference tournament champion

† NCAA canceled 2020 collegiate activities due to the COVID-19 pandemic
