= 2014 Ivy League Men's Lacrosse Tournament =

The 2014 Ivy League men's lacrosse tournament took place May 2 to May 4 at Harvard Stadium in Cambridge, Massachusetts. Penn defeated Harvard to win the tournament and received the Ivy League 's automatic bid to the 2014 NCAA Division I Men's Lacrosse Championship.

== Standings ==
The top four teams in the Ivy League after the regular season advance to the Ivy League Conference Tournament. Harvard and Cornell finished the regular season with identical 5-1 records and share the league title. Tiebreakers only apply to tournament seeding. The winner of the tournament only receives the league's automatic bid to the NCAA tournament. League champion is determined only by regular season results.

Seed	School	Conference	Overall	Tiebreaker
1	Harvard‡*	5-1	11–5	1-0 vs. Cornell
2	Cornell‡*	5–1	10–7	0-1 vs. Harvard
3	Penn*	4–2	11–4	
4	Yale*	3–3	9–5	
5	Brown	2-4	8-6	
6	Princeton	2–4	7-6	
7	Dartmouth	0-6	2-10	
‡ Ivy League regular season champions. * Qualify for the tournament.

== Schedule ==
Session	Game	Time*	Matchup^{#}	Score	Television
Semi-finals – Friday, May 2
1	1	5:00 pm	#2 Cornell vs. #3 Penn	10-11	ESPN 3
1	2	8:00 pm	#1 Harvard vs. #4 Yale	10-9	ESPN 3
Championship – Sunday, May 4
2	3	Noon	#1 Harvard vs. #3 Penn	5-7	ESPN U
*Game times in EST. #-Rankings denote tournament seeding.

== All-Tournament ==
Matt Donovan, Cornell

Conrad Oberbeck, Yale

Brian Fischer, Harvard

Danny Feeney, Penn

Daniel Eipp, Harvard

Zack Losco, Penn

Devin Dwyer, Harvard

Nick Doktor, Penn

Brian Feeney, Penn

Peter Schwartz, Harvard

Most Outstanding Player

Zack Losco, Penn
