= List of NCAA Division II lacrosse programs =

This is a list of National Collegiate Athletic Association (NCAA) schools in the United States and Canada that play lacrosse as a varsity sport at the Division II level. In the 2026 NCAA lacrosse season, there are 79 men's and 112 women's Division II lacrosse programs.

Dates of addition or dropping of lacrosse, or changes in conference affiliation, reflect the time at which the change takes effect. Because NCAA lacrosse for both men and women is a spring sport, this will not match the first overall season of competition for new teams, or the first season of competition in a new conference. For teams departing Division II, the departure will take place after the completion of that year's lacrosse season.

Conference affiliations are current for the 2027 NCAA lacrosse season.

== NCAA Division II men's lacrosse programs ==
- Reclassifying institution in yellow; institution that has announced a future departure from Division II lacrosse highlighted in pink.

School	Nickname	City	State/ Province	Conference	Note
Adams State University	Grizzlies	Alamosa	Colorado	Rocky Mountain Athletic Conference	
Adelphi University	Panthers	Garden City	New York	Northeast-10 Conference	
University of Alabama in Huntsville	Chargers	Huntsville	Alabama	Peach Belt Conference	(Note: Alabama-Huntsville, Montevallo - PBC affiliate members / Primary: Gulf South Conference.)
American International College	Yellow Jackets	Springfield	Massachusetts	Northeast-10 Conference	
Anderson University	Trojans	Anderson	South Carolina	South Atlantic Conference	
Assumption University	Greyhounds	Worcester	Massachusetts	Northeast-10 Conference	
Barry University	Buccaneers	Miami Shores	Florida	Sunshine State Conference	
Barton College	Bulldogs	Wilson	North Carolina	Conference Carolinas	
Belmont Abbey College	Crusaders	Belmont	North Carolina	Conference Carolinas	
Bentley University	Falcons	Waltham	Massachusetts	Northeast-10 Conference	
University of Bridgeport	Purple Knights	Bridgeport	Connecticut	Central Atlantic Collegiate Conference	
Caldwell University	Cougars	Caldwell	New Jersey	Central Atlantic Collegiate Conference	
Catawba College	Indians	Salisbury	North Carolina	South Atlantic Conference	
Chestnut Hill College	Griffins	Philadelphia	Pennsylvania	Central Atlantic Collegiate Conference	
Chowan University	Hawks	Murfreesboro	North Carolina	Conference Carolinas	
Coker University	Cobras	Hartsville	South Carolina	South Atlantic Conference	
Colorado Mesa University	Mavericks	Grand Junction	Colorado	Rocky Mountain Athletic Conference	
Concordia University Irvine	Golden Eagles	Irvine	California	Rocky Mountain Athletic Conference	(Note: Concordia-Irvine, Dominican (CA) - RMAC affiliate members / Primary: Pacific West Conference.)
Davenport University	Panthers	Grand Rapids	Michigan	Great Midwest Athletic Conference	(Note: Davenport - G-MAC affiliate member / Primary: Great Lakes Intercollegiate Athletic Conference)
Davis & Elkins College	Senators	Elkins	West Virginia	Great Midwest Athletic Conference	(Note: Davis & Elkins, Point Park, Wheeling - G-MAC affiliate members / Primary: Mountain East Conference)
University of the District of Columbia	Firebirds	Washington	District of Columbia	East Coast Conference	
Dominican University New York	Chargers	Orangeburg	New York	Central Atlantic Collegiate Conference	
Dominican University of California	Penguins	San Rafael	California	Rocky Mountain Athletic Conference	
D'Youville University	Saints	Buffalo	New York	East Coast Conference	
Embry-Riddle Aeronautical University	Eagles	Daytona Beach	Florida	Sunshine State Conference	
Emmanuel University	Lions	Franklin Springs	Georgia	Conference Carolinas	
Emory and Henry University	Wasps	Emory	Virginia	South Atlantic Conference	
Felician University	Golden Falcons	Rutherford	New Jersey	Central Atlantic Collegiate Conference	
Ferrum College	Panthers	Ferrum	Virginia	Conference Carolinas	
Flagler College	Saints	St. Augustine	Florida	Peach Belt Conference	
Florida Southern College	Moccasins	Lakeland	Florida	Sunshine State Conference	
Florida Institute of Technology	Panthers	Melbourne	Florida	Sunshine State Conference	
Franklin Pierce University	Ravens	Rindge	New Hampshire	Northeast-10 Conference	
Frostburg State University	Bobcats	Frostburg	Maryland	East Coast Conference	(Note: Frostburg State - ECC affiliate member / Primary: Mountain East Conference)
Georgian Court University	Lions	Lakewood	New Jersey	Central Atlantic Collegiate Conference	
Holy Family University	Tigers	Philadelphia	Pennsylvania	Central Atlantic Collegiate Conference	
University of Indianapolis	Greyhounds	Indianapolis	Indiana	Great Lakes Valley Conference	
Lander University	Bearcats	Greenwood	South Carolina	Peach Belt Conference	
Lake Erie College	Storm	Painesville	Ohio	Great Midwest Athletic Conference	
Lees-McRae College	Bobcats	Banner Elk	North Carolina	Conference Carolinas	
Lewis University	Flyers	Romeoville	Illinois	Great Lakes Valley Conference	
Lenoir-Rhyne University	Bears	Hickory	North Carolina	South Atlantic Conference	
Lincoln Memorial University	Railsplitters	Harrogate	Tennessee	South Atlantic Conference	
Lynn University	Fighting Knights	Boca Raton	Florida	Sunshine State Conference	
Malone University	Pioneers	Canton	Ohio	Great Midwest Athletic Conference	
Mars Hill University	Lions	Mars Hill	North Carolina	South Atlantic Conference	
Maryville University	Saints	St. Louis	Missouri	Great Lakes Valley Conference	
Mercy University	Mavericks	Dobbs Ferry	New York	East Coast Conference	
Molloy University	Lions	Rockville Centre	New York	East Coast Conference	
University of Montevallo	Falcons	Montevallo	Alabama	Peach Belt Conference	
University of Mount Olive	Trojans	Mount Olive	North Carolina	Conference Carolinas	
Newberry College	Wolves	Newberry	South Carolina	South Atlantic Conference	
North Greenville University	Crusaders	Tigerville	South Carolina	Conference Carolinas	
Northwest Nazarene University	Nighthawks	Nampa	Idaho	Rocky Mountain Athletic Conference	(Note: Northwest Nazarene - RMAC affiliate member / Primary: Great Northwest Athletic Conference.)
Northwood University	Timberwolves	Midland	Michigan	Great Midwest Athletic Conference	
Nova Southeastern University	Sharks	Fort Lauderdale	Florida	Sunshine State Conference	
Pace University	Setters	Pleasantville	New York	Northeast-10 Conference	
Palm Beach Atlantic University	Sailfish	West Palm Beach	Florida	Sunshine State Conference	
Point Park University	Pioneers	Pittsburgh	Pennsylvania	Great Midwest Athletic Conference	
Post University	Eagles	Waterbury	Connecticut	Central Atlantic Collegiate Conference	
Quincy University	Hawks	Quincy	Illinois	Great Lakes Valley Conference	
Roberts Wesleyan University	Redhawks	North Chili	New York	East Coast Conference	
Rockhurst University	Hawks	Kansas City	Missouri	Great Lakes Valley Conference	
Rollins College	Tars	Winter Park	Florida	Sunshine State Conference	
Saint Anselm College	Hawks	Goffstown	New Hampshire	Northeast-10 Conference	
Saint Leo University	Lions	St. Leo	Florida	Sunshine State Conference	
Saint Michael's College	Purple Knights	Colchester	Vermont	Northeast-10 Conference	
St. Thomas Aquinas College	Spartans	Sparkill	New York	East Coast Conference	
Seton Hill University	Griffins	Greensburg	Pennsylvania	Great Midwest Athletic Conference	(Note: Seton Hill - G-MAC affiliate member / Primary: Pennsylvania State Athletic Conference.)
Shorter University	Hawks	Rome	Georgia	Conference Carolinas	
Southern New Hampshire University	Penmen	Manchester	New Hampshire	Northeast-10 Conference	
University of Tampa	Spartans	Tampa	Florida	Sunshine State Conference	
Thomas More University	Saints	Crestview Hills	Kentucky	Great Midwest Athletic Conference	
Tiffin University	Dragons	Tiffin	Ohio	Great Midwest Athletic Conference	
Tusculum University	Pioneers	Greeneville	Tennessee	South Atlantic Conference	
Virginia State University	Trojans	Ettrick	Virginia	Peach Belt Conference	(Note: Virginia State - PBC affiliate member / Primary: Central Intercollegiate Athletic Association.)
Walsh University	Cavaliers	North Canton	Ohio	Great Midwest Athletic Conference	
Westminster University	Griffins	Salt Lake City	Utah	Rocky Mountain Athletic Conference	
Wheeling University	Cardinals	Wheeling	West Virginia	Great Midwest Athletic Conference	
William Jewell College	Cardinals	Liberty	Missouri	Great Lakes Valley Conference	
Wilmington University	Wildcats	New Castle	Delaware	Central Atlantic Collegiate Conference	
Wingate University	Bulldogs	Wingate	North Carolina	South Atlantic Conference	
Young Harris College	Mountain Lions	Young Harris	Georgia	Conference Carolinas	

== NCAA Division II women's lacrosse programs ==
- Reclassifying institution in yellow; institution that has announced a future departure from Division II lacrosse highlighted in pink.

School	Nickname	City	State/ Province	Conference	Note
Adelphi University	Panthers	Garden City	New York	Northeast-10 Conference	
University of Alabama in Huntsville	Chargers	Huntsville	Alabama	Gulf South Conference	
American International College	Yellow Jackets	Springfield	Massachusetts	Northeast-10 Conference	
Anderson University	Trojans	Anderson	South Carolina	South Atlantic Conference	
Ashland University	Eagles	Ashland	Ohio	Great Midwest Athletic Conference	
Assumption University	Greyhounds	Worcester	Massachusetts	Northeast-10 Conference	
Barry University	Buccaneers	Miami Shores	Florida	Sunshine State Conference	
Barton College	Bulldogs	Wilson	North Carolina	Conference Carolinas	
Belmont Abbey College	Crusaders	Belmont	North Carolina	Conference Carolinas	
Bentley University	Falcons	Waltham	Massachusetts	Northeast-10 Conference	
University of Bridgeport	Purple Knights	Bridgeport	Connecticut	Central Atlantic Collegiate Conference	
Caldwell University	Cougars	Caldwell	New Jersey	Central Atlantic Collegiate Conference	
Catawba College	Indians	Salisbury	North Carolina	South Atlantic Conference	
University of Charleston	Golden Eagles	Charleston	West Virginia	Mountain East Conference	
Chestnut Hill College	Griffins	Philadelphia	Pennsylvania	Central Atlantic Collegiate Conference	
Chowan University	Hawks	Murfreesboro	North Carolina	Conference Carolinas	
Coker University	Cobras	Hartsville	South Carolina	South Atlantic Conference	
Colorado Mesa University	Mavericks	Grand Junction	Colorado	Rocky Mountain Athletic Conference	
University of Colorado Colorado Springs	Mountain Lions	Colorado Springs	Colorado	Rocky Mountain Athletic Conference	
Commonwealth University-Bloomsburg	Huskies	Bloomsburg	Pennsylvania	Pennsylvania State Athletic Conference	
Commonwealth University-Lock Haven	Bald Eagles	Lock Haven	Pennsylvania	Pennsylvania State Athletic Conference	
Concordia University-St. Paul	Golden Bears	St. Paul	Minnesota	Great Lakes Intercollegiate Athletic Conference	(Note: Concordia-St. Paul - GLIAC affiliate member / Primary: Northern Sun Intercollegiate Conference.)
Converse University	Valkyries	Spartanburg	South Carolina	Conference Carolinas	
Daemen University	Wildcats	Amherst	New York	East Coast Conference	
Davenport University	Panthers	Grand Rapids	Michigan	Great Lakes Intercollegiate Athletic Conference	
Davis & Elkins College	Senators	Elkins	West Virginia	Mountain East Conference	
University of the District of Columbia	Firebirds	Washington	District of Columbia	East Coast Conference	
Dominican University of California	Penguins	San Rafael	California	Mountain East Conference	(Note: Dominican (CA) - MEC affiliate member / Primary: Pacific West Conference.)
Dominican University New York	Chargers	Orangeburg	New York	Central Atlantic Collegiate Conference	
D'Youville University	Saints	Buffalo	New York	East Coast Conference	
East Stroudsburg University	Warriors	East Stroudsburg	Pennsylvania	Pennsylvania State Athletic Conference	
PennWest Edinboro	Fighting Scots	Edinboro	Pennsylvania	Pennsylvania State Athletic Conference	
Embry-Riddle Aeronautical University	Eagles	Daytona Beach	Florida	Sunshine State Conference	
Emmanuel University	Lions	Franklin Springs	Georgia	Conference Carolinas	
Emory and Henry University	Wasps	Emory	Virginia	South Atlantic Conference	
Erskine College	Flying Fleet	Due West	South Carolina	Conference Carolinas	
Felician University	Golden Falcons	Rutherford	New Jersey	Central Atlantic Collegiate Conference	
Ferrum College	Panthers	Ferrum	Virginia	Conference Carolinas	
University of Findlay	Oilers	Findlay	Ohio	Great Midwest Athletic Conference	
Flagler College	Saints	St. Augustine	Florida	Gulf South Conference	(Note: Flagler, Lander - GSC affiliate members / Primary: Peach Belt Conference.)
Florida Southern College	Moccasins	Lakeland	Florida	Sunshine State Conference	
Florida Institute of Technology	Panthers	Melbourne	Florida	Sunshine State Conference	
Fort Lewis College	Skyhawks	Durango	Colorado	Rocky Mountain Athletic Conference	
Franklin Pierce University	Ravens	Rindge	New Hampshire	Northeast-10 Conference	
Frostburg State University	Bobcats	Frostburg	Maryland	Mountain East Conference	
Gannon University	Golden Knights	Erie	Pennsylvania	Pennsylvania State Athletic Conference	
Georgian Court University	Lions	Lakewood	New Jersey	Central Atlantic Collegiate Conference	
Grand Valley State University	Lakers	Allendale	Michigan	Great Lakes Intercollegiate Athletic Conference	
Holy Family University	Tigers	Philadelphia	Pennsylvania	Central Atlantic Collegiate Conference	
Indiana University of Pennsylvania	Crimson Hawks	Indiana	Pennsylvania	Pennsylvania State Athletic Conference	
University of Indianapolis	Greyhounds	Indianapolis	Indiana	Great Lakes Valley Conference	
Thomas Jefferson University	Rams	Philadelphia	Pennsylvania	Central Atlantic Collegiate Conference	
Kutztown University	Golden Bears	Kutztown	Pennsylvania	Pennsylvania State Athletic Conference	
Lake Erie College	Storm	Painesville	Ohio	Great Midwest Athletic Conference	
Lander University	Bearcats	Greenwood	South Carolina	Gulf South Conference	
Lee University	Flames	Cleveland	Tennessee	Gulf South Conference	
Lees-McRae College	Bobcats	Banner Elk	North Carolina	Conference Carolinas	
Lenoir-Rhyne University	Bears	Hickory	North Carolina	South Atlantic Conference	
Lewis University	Flyers	Romeoville	Illinois	Great Lakes Valley Conference	
Lincoln Memorial University	Railsplitters	Harrogate	Tennessee	South Atlantic Conference	
Lynn University	Fighting Knights	Boca Raton	Florida	Sunshine State Conference	
Malone University	Pioneers	Canton	Ohio	Great Midwest Athletic Conference	
Mars Hill University	Lions	Mars Hill	North Carolina	South Atlantic Conference	
Maryville University	Saints	Town and Country	Missouri	Great Lakes Valley Conference	
McKendree University	Bearcats	Lebanon	Illinois	Great Lakes Valley Conference	
Mercy University	Mavericks	Dobbs Ferry	New York	East Coast Conference	
Millersville University	Marauders	Millersville	Pennsylvania	Pennsylvania State Athletic Conference	
Missouri Western State University	Griffons	St. Joseph	Missouri	Great Lakes Valley Conference	(Note: Missouri Western - GLVC affiliate member / Primary: Mid-America Intercollegiate Athletic Association.)
Molloy University	Lions	Rockville Centre	New York	East Coast Conference	
University of Montevallo	Falcons	Montevallo	Alabama	Gulf South Conference	
University of Mount Olive	Trojans	Mount Olive	North Carolina	Conference Carolinas	
Newberry College	Wolves	Newberry	South Carolina	South Atlantic Conference	
North Greenville University	Crusaders	Tigerville	South Carolina	Conference Carolinas	
Northern Michigan University	Wildcats	Marquette	Michigan	Great Lakes Intercollegiate Athletic Conference	
Northwood University	Timberwolves	Midland	Michigan	Great Midwest Athletic Conference	
Nova Southeastern University	Sharks	Fort Lauderdale	Florida	Sunshine State Conference	
Pace University	Setters	Pleasantville	New York	Northeast-10 Conference	
Palm Beach Atlantic University	Sailfish	West Palm Beach	Florida	Sunshine State Conference	
Point Park University	Pioneers	Pittsburgh	Pennsylvania	Mountain East Conference	
Post University	Eagles	Waterbury	Connecticut	Central Atlantic Collegiate Conference	
Quincy University	Hawks	Quincy	Illinois	Great Lakes Valley Conference	
Regis University	Rangers	Denver	Colorado	Rocky Mountain Athletic Conference	
Roberts Wesleyan University	Redhawks	North Chili	New York	East Coast Conference	
Rockhurst University	Hawks	Kansas City	Missouri	Great Lakes Valley Conference	
Rollins College	Tars	Winter Park	Florida	Sunshine State Conference	
Saginaw Valley State University	Cardinals	University Center	Michigan	Great Lakes Intercollegiate Athletic Conference	
Saint Anselm College	Hawks	Goffstown	New Hampshire	Northeast-10 Conference	
Saint Leo University	Lions	St. Leo	Florida	Sunshine State Conference	
Saint Michael's College	Purple Knights	Colchester	Vermont	Northeast-10 Conference	
St. Thomas Aquinas College	Spartans	Sparkill	New York	East Coast Conference	
Seton Hill University	Griffins	Greensburg	Pennsylvania	Pennsylvania State Athletic Conference	
Shepherd University	Rams	Shepherdstown	West Virginia	Pennsylvania State Athletic Conference	
Shippensburg University	Raiders	Shippensburg	Pennsylvania	Pennsylvania State Athletic Conference	
Shorter University	Hawks	Rome	Georgia	Conference Carolinas	
Slippery Rock University	The Rock	Slippery Rock	Pennsylvania	Pennsylvania State Athletic Conference	
Southern Connecticut State University	Fighting Owls	New Haven	Connecticut	Northeast-10 Conference	
Southern New Hampshire University	Penmen	Manchester	New Hampshire	Northeast-10 Conference	
Southern Wesleyan University	Warriors	Central	South Carolina	Conference Carolinas	
University of Tampa	Spartans	Tampa	Florida	Sunshine State Conference	
Thomas More University	Saints	Crestview Hills	Kentucky	Great Midwest Athletic Conference	
Tiffin University	Dragons	Tiffin	Ohio	Great Midwest Athletic Conference	
Trevecca Nazarene University	Trojans	Nashville	Tennessee	Gulf South Conference	
Tusculum University	Pioneers	Greeneville	Tennessee	South Atlantic Conference	
Ursuline College	Arrows	Pepper Pike	Ohio	Great Midwest Athletic Conference	
Virginia State University	Trojans	Ettrick	Virginia	Gulf South Conference	(Note: Virginia State - GSC affiliate member / Primary: Central Intercollegiate Athletic Association.)
University of Virginia's College at Wise	Cavaliers	Wise	Virginia	South Atlantic Conference	
Walsh University	Cavaliers	North Canton	Ohio	Great Midwest Athletic Conference	
West Chester University	Golden Rams	West Chester	Pennsylvania	Pennsylvania State Athletic Conference	
West Virginia Wesleyan College	Bobcats	Buckhannon	West Virginia	Mountain East Conference	
Westminster University	Griffins	Salt Lake City	Utah	Rocky Mountain Athletic Conference	
Wheeling University	Cardinals	Wheeling	West Virginia	Mountain East Conference	
William Jewell College	Cardinals	Liberty	Missouri	Great Lakes Valley Conference	
Wilmington University	Wildcats	New Castle	Delaware	Central Atlantic Collegiate Conference	
Wingate University	Bulldogs	Wingate	North Carolina	South Atlantic Conference	
Young Harris College	Mountain Lions	Young Harris	Georgia	Conference Carolinas	

== See also ==
- NCAA Division II men's lacrosse tournament
- NCAA Division II women's lacrosse tournament
- List of NCAA Division II institutions
- List of NCAA Division II football programs
- List of NCAA Division II baseball programs
- List of NCAA Division II men's soccer programs
- List of NCAA Division II men's wrestling programs
- List of NCAA Division II men's basketball programs
- List of NCAA Division I lacrosse programs
- NAIA lacrosse
