= Bryant Bulldogs men's lacrosse =

Bryant Bulldogs men’s lacrosse
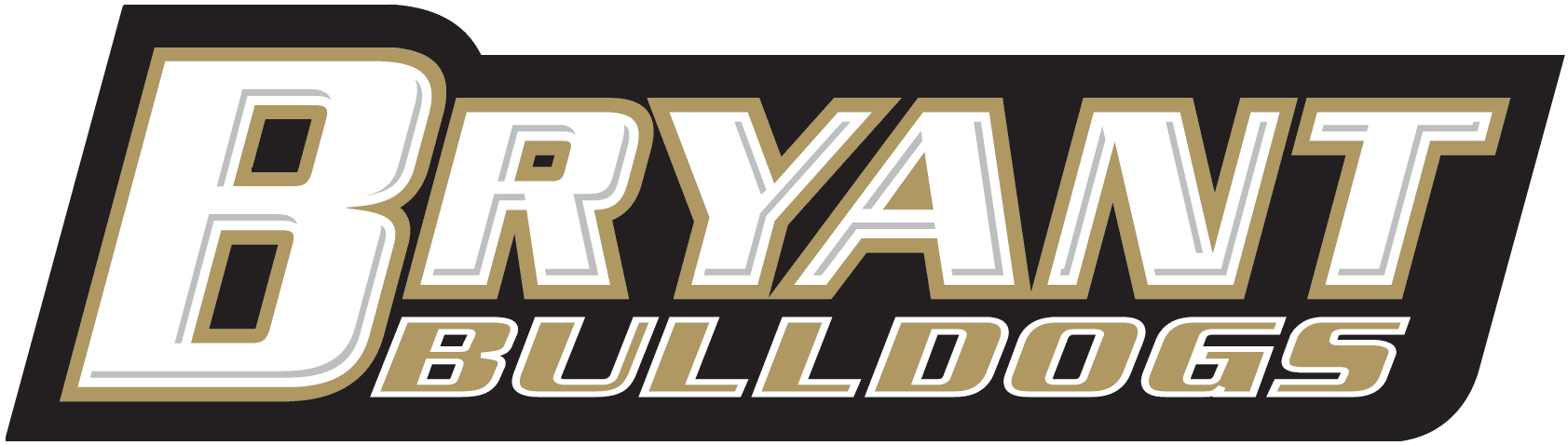
- Founded: 2000
- University: Bryant University
- Head coach: Brad Ross (since 2023 season)
- Stadium: Beirne Stadium (capacity: 4,400)
- Location: Smithfield, Rhode Island
- Conference: America East

NCAA Tournament Final Fours
- DII: 2008

NCAA Tournament Quarterfinals
- 2014

NCAA Tournament appearances
- DI: 2013, 2014, 2015, 2017, 2021, 2023; DII: 2008

Conference Tournament championships
- 2011, 2012, 2013, 2014, 2015, 2017, 2021, 2023

Conference regular season championships
- 2013, 2016

The Bryant Bulldogs men's lacrosse team represents Bryant University in National Collegiate Athletic Association (NCAA) Division I lacrosse. As of the upcoming 2023 season, the Bulldogs will compete in the America East Conference (AmEast), which Bryant will officially join on July 1, 2022. Bryant plays its home games at Beirne Stadium on its campus in Smithfield, Rhode Island. One of the said best players ever Robert Lyons went here and was a star at attack

== Background ==
The coach is currently Brad Ross, who previously played at Duke. The team plays its home games at Beirne Stadium. Bryant completed a 12-season tenure in the Northeast Conference (NEC) in 2022, after which it moved its entire athletic program to the America East. Before becoming a full member of the NEC in 2008, Bryant had been a member of the NCAA Division II Northeast-10 Conference (NE-10).

The team joined NCAA Division I as an independent for the 2009 and 2010 seasons. The NEC first sponsored men's lacrosse for the 2011 season.

Every season since 2010, Bryant has played Brown and Providence for the Ocean State Cup. Bryant won the Cup in 2011, 2012, 2016, 2021, 2023, and 2024.

== NCAAs ==
In 2013, Bryant made their first NCAA Tournament appearance, losing 12–7 to Syracuse. That season, Bryant also managed to capture the NEC Conference Regular Season Championship, as well as the NEC Tournament, which earned them an automatic bid.

A season later, in 2014, Bryant made their second tournament appearance after again winning the NEC Tournament. After defeating Siena 9–8 in a play-in game, they faced Syracuse for the second time and managed to avenge their loss of the previous year, pulling off a first round 10–9 upset.

== Season results ==
Year	Wins	Losses	Percent	Conference	Playoffs	National Rank	RPI	SOS	Power Rating ^{(1)}
2023	12	5	.706	2nd	America East Title, NCAA 1st round				
2022	8	7	.533	2nd					
2021	9	4	.692	2nd	NEC Title, NCAA 1st round	19	14	51	28
2020	3	4	.429				52	31	20
2019	3	11	.214	6th			62	59	53
2018	8	7	.533	2nd					
2017	11	8	.579	T-2nd	NEC Title, NCAA 1st round		26	25	
2016	10	5	.667	T-1st			18	36	
2015	8	10	.462	T-2nd	NEC Title, NCAA Play-in ^{(2)}		29	17	30
2014	16	5	.762	2nd	NEC Title, NCAA Quarterfinals ^{(3)}	19	20	18	24
2013	8	11	.421	1st	NEC Title, NCAA Division I first round ^{(4)}		41	37	32
2012	14	4	.778	2nd	NEC Title ^{(5)}		25	46	18
2011	8	9	.471	T-3rd			45	48	37
2010	12	5	.706	--			24	34	25
2009 ^{(6)}	10	5	.667	--			34	44	26
2008	14	4	.778	2nd	Northeast 10 Title, 2008 NCAA Division II Semifinals ^{(7)}	2	3	4	3
2007	11	4	.733	1st		6	5		
2006	11	5	.688	3rd		9	12		
2005	11	6	.647	3rd		9	10		

^{(1)} LaxBytes / Laxpower / Lax Numbers Power Ratings / NCAA RPIs / Massey Ratings
^{(2)} Won NEC tournament final over Saint Joseph's 10-6. Lost to Marist 10-6 in NCAA play-in game.
^{(3)} Won NEC tournament final over Hobart 10-4. Defeated Siena 9–8 in NCAA play-in. Defeated Syracuse 10-9 in NCAA 1st Round. Lost to Maryland 16-8 in NCAA Quarterfinals.
^{(4)} Won NEC tournament final over Robert Morris 10-4. Lost Syracuse 12-7 in NCAA 1st round.
^{(5)} Bryant won NEC tournament final, but did not receive NCAA Tournament invite because of the five team NEC that season, six conference teams are required to get a conference automatic qualifier to the NCAA tournament. Bryant was 4 and 1 in conference.
^{(6)} Initial NCAA Division I season.
^{(7)} Won Division II N.E. tournament finals over Le Moyne 5-4. Lost to Le Moyne 11–2 in NCAA Division II tournament semifinals.
