= Mount St. Mary's Mountaineers men's lacrosse =

Collegiate Lacrosse Team

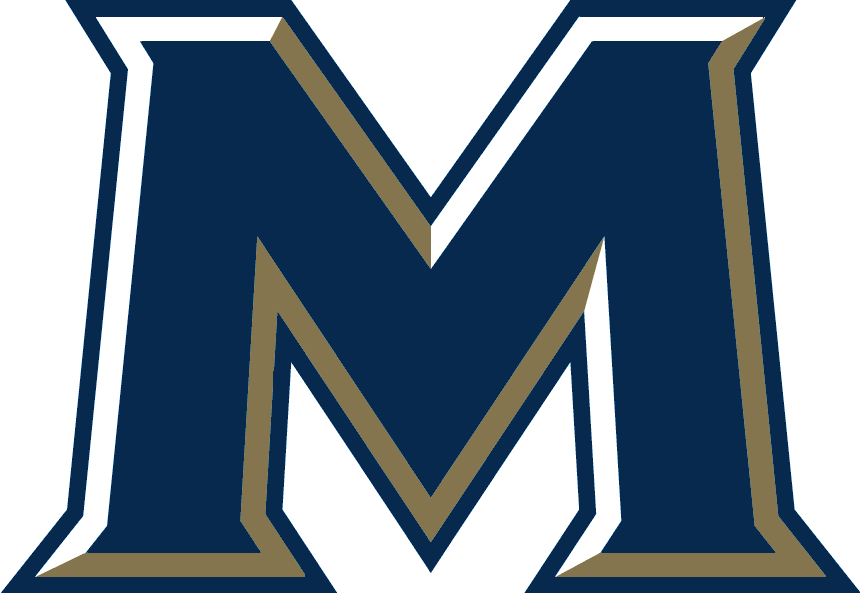
- Founded: 1970
- University: Mount St. Mary's University
- Athletic director: Lynne Robinson
- Head coach: Chris Ryan (4th season)
- Other staff: Ryan O'Hagan
- Stadium: Waldron Family Stadium (capacity: 1000)
- Location: Emmitsburg, Maryland
- Conference: Metro Atlantic Athletic Conference
- Past conferences: Eastern College Athletic Conference, Northeast Conference
- Nickname: Mountaineers
- Colors: Blue, White, and Bronze
- Website: MSMU Men's Lacrosse

NCAA Tournament appearances
- 2003, 2010

Conference Tournament championships
- 2001, 2003, 2010, 2011

Conference regular season championships
- 1999, 2001, 2010, 2011, 2019, 2023

Mount St. Mary's Mountaineers men's lacrosse is a National Collegiate Athletic Association (NCAA) division I men's college lacrosse team representing Mount St. Mary's University in the Metro Atlantic Athletic Conference (MAAC). The Mountaineers earned regular season conference titles in 1999, 2001, 2010, 2011, 2019, and 2023; won conference tournament championships in 2001, 2003, 2010, and 2011; and faced the University of Virginia in their 2003 and 2010 NCAA Division I men's lacrosse tournament appearances.

== Current season ==
Head coach Chris Ryan was assisted by coaches Ryan O'Hagan, Matthew Dugan, and Kevin Murphy in his second season at the Mount. Mekai Nelson, Brian Bradley, Seamus McCloskey, and Nathanael Merchant served as captains.

== Athletic divisions and conferences ==
Inaugural season	Final season	NCAA Division	Conference
1970–71	1988–89	Division II	
1989–90	1994–95	Division I	Eastern College Athletic Conference (ECAC)
1995–96	2009–10	Division I	Metro Atlantic Athletic Conference (MAAC)
2010–11	2021–22	Division I	Northeast Conference (NEC)
2022–23	present	Division I	MAAC

== Team records ==
Season	Overall			Conference			Postseason
Season	Win	Loss	Win%	Win	Loss	Win%	Postseason
2025	4	10	29%	2	6	25%	
2024	1	13	7%	1	7	13%	
2023	8	8	50%	7	2	78%	
2022	5	10	33%	2	5	29%	
2021	4	9	31%	2	5	29%	
2020	3	5	38%	0	0	0%	
2019	9	7	56%	5	1	83%	NEC Champions
2018	5	9	36%	2	4	33%	
2017	4	10	29%	1	5	17%	
2016	6	8	43%	2	4	33%	
2015	5	10	33%	2	4	33%	
2014	1	15	6%	1	5	17%	
2013	6	9	40%	2	3	40%	
2012	6	9	40%	2	3	40%	
2011	9	6	60%	4	1	80%	NEC Champions; NEC Tournament Champions
2010	12	5	71%	7	1	88%	MAAC Champions; MAAC Tournament Champions; NCAA Tournament First Round
2009	5	10	33%	5	3	61%	
2008	2	12	14%	2	6	25%	
2007	4	10	29%	4	4	50%	
2006	7	9	44%				
2005	8	9	47%				
2004	5	8	38%				
2003	10	8	56%				MAAC Tournament Champions; NCAA Tournament First Round
2002	6	11	35%				
2001	11	6	65%				MAAC Champions; MAAC Tournament Champions
2000	8	8	50%				
1999	11	6	65%				MAAC Champions
1998	7	10	41%				
1997	9	7	56%				
1996	7	9	44%				
1995	3	11	21%				
1994	3	10	23%				
1993	4	9	31%				
1992	4	9	31%				
1991	10	3	77%				
1990	6	5	55%				
1989	7	4	64%				

== Conference awards ==
First Team

- Russell Moncure (2010)
- Bryant Schmidt (2010, 2011, 2012)
- T.C. DiBartolo (2009, 2010, 2011)
- Cody Lehrer (2010)
- Brett Schmidt (2011, 2013)
- Andrew Scalley (2011, 2012, 2013)
- Bubba Johnson (2016)
- Jack Mangan (2019)
- Bryan McIntosh (2019)
- Dylan Furnback (2019)
- Connor Beals (2023)
- Steven Schmitt (2023)
- Mitchell Dunham (2023)
- Jared McMahon (2023)
- Jake Krieger (2023)

Second Team

- Matt Nealis (2010)
- Brett Schmidt (2010, 2012)
- Ben Trapp (2011)
- Cody Lehrer (2011)
- Kevin Downs (2012)
- John Anderson (2013)
- Mark Hojnoski (2016)
- Jack Mangan (2017)
- Chris DiPretoro (2019)
- Luke Frankeny (2019)
- Joshua Davies (2019)
- Bryan McIntosh (2019, 2021)
- Jackson Phillips (2023)

Rookie Team

- Andrew Scalley (2010)
- Brett Schmidt (2010)
- Bryant Schmidt (2010)
- Kevin Downs (2011)
- Kyle O’Brien (2012)
- Matt Vierheller (2015)
- Nick Firman (2015)
- Chris DiPretoro (2016)
- Jack Mangan (2016)
- Henry Berg (2018)
- Bryan McIntosh (2018)
- Sam Stephan (2018)
- Jared McMahon (2019)
- TJ Gravante (2023)

Preseason Player of the Year

- Mitchell Dunham (2024)

Offensive Player of the Year

- Andrew Scalley (2013)

Defensive Player of the Year

- T.C. DiBartolo (2011)
- Dylan Furnback (2019)
- Mitchell Dunham (2023)

Long Stick Midfielder of the Year

- Steven Schmitt (2023)

Face-off Specialist of the Year

- Connor Beals (2023)

Rookie of the Year

- Andrew Scalley (2010)
- TJ Gravante (2023)

Coach of the Year

- Tom Gravante (2010, 2011, 2019)

Tournament Team

- T.C. DiBartolo (2009, 2010, 2011)
- Andrew Scalley (2011, 2012)
- Brett Schmidt (2011, 2012)
- Cody Lehrer (2011)
- Christian Kellett (2012)
- Nick Firman (2015)
- Matt Vierheller (2015)
- Jack Mangan (2019)
- Brenden McCarthy (2019)

Tournament MVP

- T.C. DiBartolo (2011)

Player of the Week

- Andrew Scalley, 8x (2010, 2012, 2013)
- Brett Schmidt, 3x (2011)
- Cody Lehrer, 2x (2010)
- Mark Hojnoski (2016)
- Brenden McCarthy (2018)
- Cormac Giblin (2022)

Defensive Player of the Week

- T.C. DiBartolo, 5x (2010, 2011)
- Dylan Furnback, 3x (2019)
- Ben Trapp (2011)
- Chris Klaiber (2012)
- Frankie McCarthy (2016)
- Matt Vierheller (2017)
- Joshua Davies (2019)
- Griffin McGinley (2022)

Rookie of the Week

- T.C. DiBartolo 2x (2008)
- Andrew Scalley, 2x (2010)
- Brett Schmidt (2010)
- Bryant Schmidt (2010)
- Braedon Graham (2012)
- Matt Vierheller, 2x (2015)
- Mike Moynihan (2015)
- Chris DiPretoro (2016)
- Brenden McCarthy (2017)
- Luke Frankeny (2018)
- Dylan Furnback (2018)
- Jared McMahon (2019)
- Brodie Atkinson (2024)

== National awards ==
USA Lacrosse Preseason All American

- Mitchell Dunham, Honorable Mention (2024)

USILA All American

- T.C. DiBartolo (2010,2011)

USILA Scholar All American

- Sam Stephan (2021)
- Noah Daniels (2022)

College Crosse All Freshman Team

- Steven Schmitt, Honorable Mention (2020)

USA Lacrosse Player of the Week

- Griffin McGinley (2022)

Lacrosse Bucket Team of the Week

- Griffin McGinley (2022)

== Professional draftees ==
Major League Lacrosse (MLL)

- T.C. DiBartolo, Chesapeake Bayhawks (2012)
- Brett Schmidt, Rochester Rattlers (2013)
- Bryant Schmidt, Rochester Rattlers (2013 supplemental)
- Jack Mangan, Atlanta Blaze (2019)

Premier Lacrosse League (PLL)

- Bryan McIntosh, Cannons Lacrosse Club (2022)

National Lacrosse League (NLL)

- Luke Frankeny, Georgia Swarm (2022)
