= Michigan Wolverines men's lacrosse =

- Founded: 2012 (varsity); 1940 (club)
- University: University of Michigan
- Head coach: Kevin Conry (since 2018 season)
- Stadium: U-M Lacrosse Stadium (capacity: 2,000)
- Location: Ann Arbor, Michigan
- Conference: Big Ten Conference
- Nickname: Wolverines
- Colors: Maize and blue

Pre-NCAA era championships
- (MCLA) 2008, 2009, 2010

NCAA Tournament Quarterfinals
- 2023

NCAA Tournament appearances
- 2023, 2024

Conference Tournament championships
- CCLA: 1999, 2000, 2001, 2002, 2003, 2005, 2007, 2008, 2009, 2010, 2011; Big Ten: 2023, 2024

Conference regular season championships
- CCLA: 1999, 2000, 2001, 2002, 2003, 2004, 2005, 2006, 2007, 2008, 2009, 2010, 2011

The Michigan Wolverines men's lacrosse team is the intercollegiate men's lacrosse program representing the University of Michigan. The school competes in the Big Ten Conference in Division I of the National Collegiate Athletic Association (NCAA). Prior to joining the NCAA, Michigan competed as a club-varsity program at the Division I level of the Men's Collegiate Lacrosse Association (MCLA) in the Central Collegiate Lacrosse Association (CCLA), where the Wolverines secured three MCLA national championships and won 11 consecutive conference titles. The team is coached by Kevin Conry.

== History ==
The Michigan men's lacrosse team is one of the oldest collegiate lacrosse programs in the Midwest, having been founded in 1940. The program competed a few years until being halted for World War II. It was restarted in 1965 and has been playing ever since.

In 2001, the Wolverines were elevated to club-varsity status, competing at the Division I level of the Men's Collegiate Lacrosse Association (MCLA) in the Central Collegiate Lacrosse Association (CCLA). In 2008, the team became the first MCLA team to complete a season undefeated, finishing 20–0 and winning their first national championship at Texas Stadium. The feat was repeated in 2009 with another 20–0 season and earned their second national championship with a 12–11 victory over Chapman University at Dick's Sporting Goods Park in Denver, Colorado. In 2010, they won their third MCLA national championship in a row, defeating Arizona State University 12–11 in Denver. In 2008, Michigan faceoff specialist Brekan Kohlitz became the first MCLA player ever selected in the Major League Lacrosse draft when he was taken in the 5th round by the Washington Bayhawks. Michigan attackman Kyle Jackson was drafted as the 7th overall pick in the National Lacrosse League by the Rochester Knighthawks in 2016.

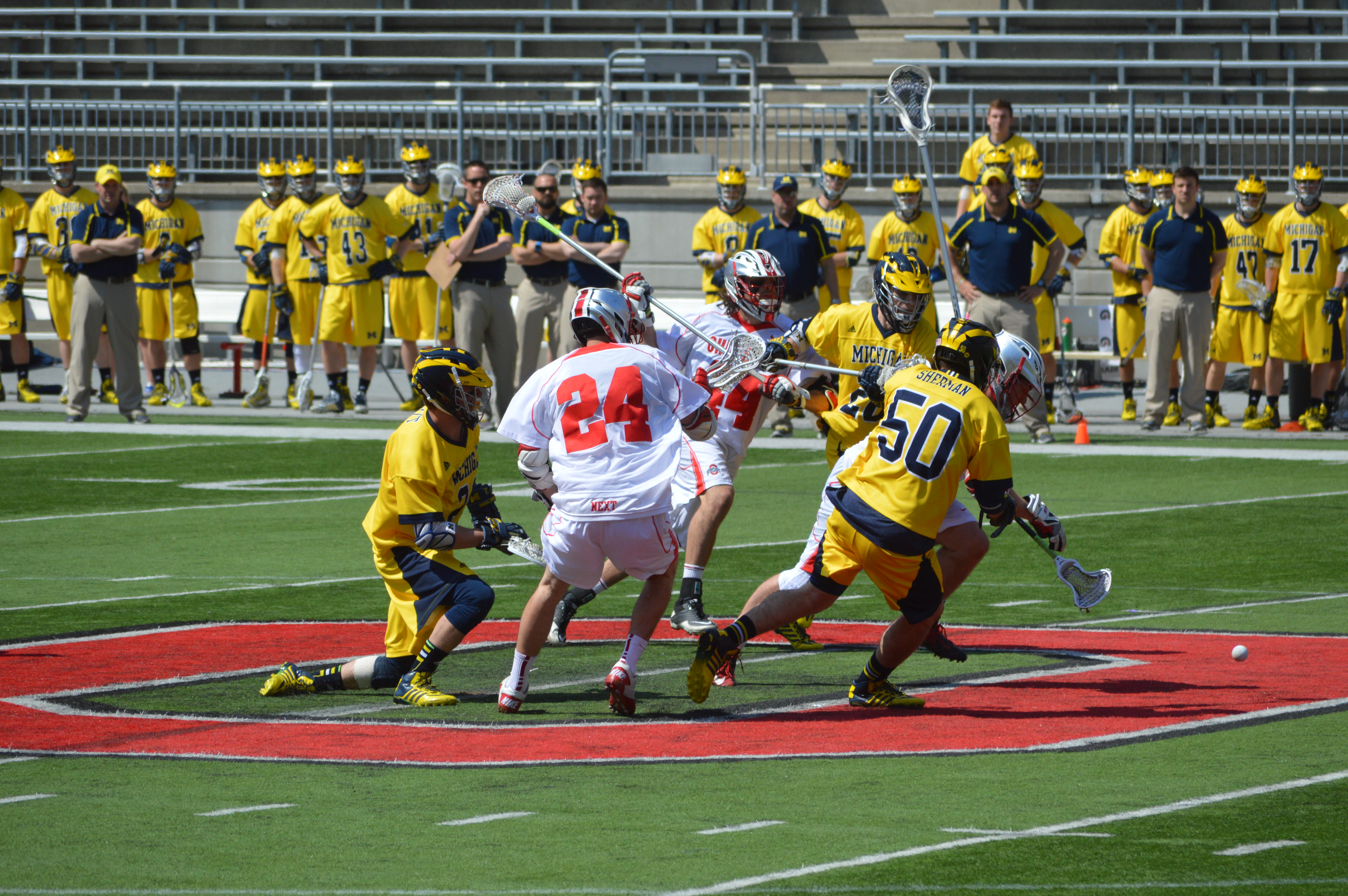
Michigan in action at Ohio Stadium against Ohio State in 2014

The program was promoted to NCAA Division I status by the university for the 2012 season. The Wolverines played in the ECAC Lacrosse League as an affiliate member during the 2012 season and as a full member in 2013 and 2014. In 2015, the Big Ten added men's lacrosse as a conference sport and the Wolverines joined Ohio State, Maryland, Rutgers, Penn State, and affiliate Johns Hopkins for the conference's first season.

== Coaching staff ==
Name	Position coached	Consecutive season at Michigan in current position
Kevin Conry	Head coach	6th
Jim Rogalski	Assistant coach	6th
Scott Bieda	Assistant coach	1st
Mark Bieda	Volunteer Assistant Coach	1st
Joe Hennessy	Director of Operations	12th

== Season results ==
The following is a list of Michigan's results by season as an NCAA Division I program:

Season	Coach	Overall	Conference	Standing	Postseason
John Paul (ECAC Lacrosse League) (2012–2014)
2012	John Paul	1–13	0–0		
2013	John Paul	1–13	0–7	8th	
2014	John Paul	5–11	1–3	4th	
John Paul (Big Ten Conference) (2015–2017)
2015	John Paul	5–8	1–4	T–5th	
2016	John Paul	3–10	0–5	6th	
2017	John Paul	8–6	0–5	6th	
John Paul:		23–61 (.274)	2–24 (.077)		
Kevin Conry (Big Ten Conference) (2018–Present)
2018	Kevin Conry	8–6	1–4	6th	
2019	Kevin Conry	4–9	1–4	T–5th	
2020	Kevin Conry	4–3	0–0	†	†
2021	Kevin Conry	3–9	2–8	T–5th	
2022	Kevin Conry	7–8	0–5	6th	
2023	Kevin Conry	10–7	2–3	4th	NCAA Division I Quarterfinals
2024	Kevin Conry	10–7	2–3	4th	NCAA Division I First Round
2025	Kevin Conry	7–7	3–2	T–2nd	
2026	Kevin Conry	6–9	2–3	5th	
Kevin Conry:		59–65 (.476)	13–32 (.289)		
Total:		82–126 (.394)			
National champion Postseason invitational champion Conference regular season champion Conference regular season and conference tournament champion Division regular season champion Division regular season and conference tournament champion Conference tournament champion

† NCAA canceled 2020 collegiate activities due to the COVID-19 pandemic

== Championships ==
=== Conference tournament championships ===
Year	Conference	Coach	Overall record	Big Ten record
2023	Big Ten	Kevin Conry	10–7	2–3
2024	Big Ten	Kevin Conry	10–7	2–3

== Postseason ==
=== NCAA tournament results ===
The Wolverines have appeared in 2 NCAA tournaments. Their postseason record is 1–2.

Year	Seed	Round	Opponent	Score
2023	--	First Round; Quarterfinal	#8 Cornell #1 Duke	W 15–14 OT; L 15–8
2024	--	First Round	#5 Denver	L 16–11

== Club results ==
=== National championships ===
MCLA Division I: 2008, 2009, 2010

=== Conference championships ===
CCLA regular season: 1999, 2000, 2001, 2002, 2003, 2004, 2005, 2006, 2007, 2008, 2009, 2010, 2011

CCLA tournament: 1999, 2000, 2001, 2002, 2003, 2005, 2007, 2008, 2009, 2010, 2011

=== Seasons results ===
The following is a list of Michigan's results by season as an independent club program from 1940 to 1971, and as a member of the Central Collegiate Lacrosse League from 1972 to 2011, prior to becoming an NCAA Division I program:

Season	Coach	Overall	Conference	Standing	Postseason
1940	Intramurals only				
Eddie Lowery (Independent) (1941–1941)
1941	Eddie Lowery	0–2			
Eddie Lowery:		0–2 (.000)			
No Teams (n/a) (1942–1964)
Bill Moller (Independent) (1965–1965)
1965	Bill Moller	0–3			
Bill Moller:		0–3 (.000)			
Bob Gillon (Independent) (1966–1966)
1966	Bob Gillon	1–3			
Bob Gillon:		1–3 (.250)			
Bob DiGiovanni (Independent) (1967–1968)
1967	Bob DiGiovanni	2–6			
1968	Bob DiGiovanni	2–3			
Skip Flanagan (Independent) (1969–1969)
1969	Skip Flanagan	1–4			
Skip Flanagan:		1–4 (.200)			
Bob Kaman (Independent) (1970–1971)
1970	Bob Kaman	5–2			
1971	Bob Kaman	8–1			
Bob Kaman (Central Collegiate Lacrosse Association) (1972–1973)
1972	Bob Kaman	6–5			
1973	Bob Kaman	11–4			
Bob Kaman:		30–12 (.714)			
Bob DiGiovanni (Central Collegiate Lacrosse Association) (1974–1979)
1974	Bob DiGiovanni	8–2			
1975	Bob DiGiovanni	13–2			
1976	Bob DiGiovanni	8–2			
1977	Bob DiGiovanni	9–4			
1978	Bob DiGiovanni	11–3			
1979	Bob DiGiovanni	9–4			
Pete Lodwick (Central Collegiate Lacrosse Association) (1980–1980)
1980	Pete Lodwick	10–4			
Pete Lodwick:		10–4 (.714)			
Rick Bays (Central Collegiate Lacrosse Association) (1981–1981)
1981	Rick Bays	15–2			
Jim Camilliere (Central Collegiate Lacrosse Association) (1982–1982)
1982	Jim Camilliere	13–2			
Jim Camilliere:		13–2 (.867)			
Rick Bays (Central Collegiate Lacrosse Association) (1983–1983)
1983	Rick Bays	19–0	?–0		
Rick Bays:		34–2 (.944)			
Steve Nazaruk (Central Collegiate Lacrosse Association) (1984–1984)
1984	Steve Nazaruk	15–2			
Steve Nazaruk:		15–2 (.882)			
Jim Plaunt (Central Collegiate Lacrosse Association) (1985–1985)
1985	Jim Plaunt	17–2			
Jim Plaunt:		17–2 (.895)			
Bob DiGiovanni (Central Collegiate Lacrosse Association) (1986–1990)
1986	Bob DiGiovanni	10–5			
1987	Bob DiGiovanni	12–4			
1988	Bob DiGiovanni	16–3			
1989	Bob DiGiovanni	15–2			
1990	Bob DiGiovanni	14–3			
Tom Fitzgibbons (Central Collegiate Lacrosse Association) (1991–1991)
1991	Tom Fitzgibbons	9–2			
Tom Fitzgibbons:		9–2 (.818)			
Bob DiGiovanni (Central Collegiate Lacrosse Association) (1992–1997)
1992	Bob DiGiovanni	14–7			
1993	Bob DiGiovanni	16–3			
1994	Bob DiGiovanni	14–0	?–0		
1995	Bob DiGiovanni	12–5			
1996	Bob DiGiovanni	15–5			
1997	Bob DiGiovanni	13–4			
Bob DiGiovanni:		213–67 (.761)			
John Paul (Central Collegiate Lacrosse Association) (1998–2011)
1998	John Paul	15–4			
1999	John Paul	16–5		1st	MCLA Division I Quarterfinals
2000	John Paul	20–6		1st	MCLA Division I Quarterfinals
2001	John Paul	19–2		1st	MCLA Division I Quarterfinals
2002	John Paul	18–3		1st	MCLA Division I Quarterfinals
2003	John Paul	16–5		1st	MCLA Division I Quarterfinals
2004	John Paul	14–4		1st	MCLA Division I Quarterfinals
2005	John Paul	18–3		1st	MCLA Division I Final Four
2006	John Paul	15–5		1st	MCLA Division I Quarterfinals
2007	John Paul	13–5		1st	MCLA Division I First Round
2008	John Paul	20–0	?–0	1st	MCLA Division I Champion
2009	John Paul	20–0	?–0	1st	MCLA Division I Champion
2010	John Paul	18–1		1st	MCLA Division I Champion
2011	John Paul	18–1	?–0	1st	MCLA Division I Final Four
John Paul:		240–44 (.845)			
Total:		583–149 (.796)			
National champion Postseason invitational champion Conference regular season champion Conference regular season and conference tournament champion Division regular season champion Division regular season and conference tournament champion Conference tournament champion

== Alumni in the Premier Lacrosse League ==
Year Drafted	Name	Position	Height	Weight	Drafted By	Draft Pick	Current Team	All Star	Accolades
2016	Kyle Jackson	Attack	5'9"	166	Undrafted	Undrafted	Chaos LC	None	None
2018	Mikie Schlosser	Midfield	6'2"	180	Denver Outlaws (MLL)	6th round (54th overall)	Waterdogs LC	1x All Star ('21)	None
