= Detroit Mercy Titans men's lacrosse =

- University: University of Detroit Mercy
- Head coach: Charlie Hayes
- Stadium: Titan Field
- Location: Detroit, Michigan
- Conference: Northeast Conference
- Colors: Red, white, and blue

The Detroit Mercy Titans Men's Lacrosse team is a college lacrosse team that represents the University of Detroit Mercy (UDM) in Detroit, Michigan, United States. The school's teams are typically members of the Horizon League, but the men's lacrosse team is an associate member of the Northeast Conference (NEC). The Titans joined that league after the 2024 season, following three seasons in the Atlantic Sun Conference (ASUN). Before that, the Titans has been men's lacrosse members of the Metro Atlantic Athletic Conference.

== History ==
=== Conference affiliations ===
- Independent (2009)
- Metro Atlantic Athletic Conference (2010–2021)
- Atlantic Sun Conference (2022–2024)
- Northeast Conference (2025–)

== Year by year results ==
Season	Coach	Overall	Conference	Standing	Postseason
2009	Matt Holtz	0–11			
2010	Matt Holtz	3–12	2-6	7th	
2011	Matt Holtz	6–10	4-2	T-2nd	
2012	Matt Holtz	6–9	3-3	T-2nd	
2013	Matt Holtz	5–10	3-3	4th	
2014	Matt Holtz	6–8	3–3	T-2nd	
2015	Chris Kolon	8–6	4–2	T-2nd	
2016	Chris Kolon	2–10	2–4	5th	
2017	Chris Kolon	5–11	3–3	T-4th	
2018	Chris Kolon	9–7	5–1	2nd	
2019	Chris Kolon	8–7	5–2	3rd	
2020	Chris Kolon	2–3			
2021	Chris Kolon	3–4	3–2	4th	
2022	Chris Kolon	2–9	1–4	5th	
2023	Chris Kolon	2–11	2–7	8th	
2024	Chris Kolon	3–10	3–6	8th	
2025	Charlie Hayes	0–3	0–0		

=== All-time coaching records ===
Head coach	Years	Win–loss–tie	Pct.
Matt Holtz	2009-2014	26-60	.302
Chris Kolon	2015-2024	44-78	.361
Charlie Hayes	2025–Present	0-3	.000
