= Siena Saints men's lacrosse =

Siena Saints
- Founded: 1937
- University: Siena College
- Head coach: Tim Cox
- Stadium: Hickey Field (capacity: 2,000)
- Location: Loudonville, New York
- Conference: MAAC
- Nickname: Saints
- Colors: Green and gold

NCAA Tournament appearances
- 2009, 2011, 2014, 2025

Conference Tournament championships
- 2009, 2011, 2014

Conference regular season championships
- 2007, 2009, 2010, 2011, 2012, 2014

The Siena Saints men's lacrosse team represents Siena College in National Collegiate Athletic Association (NCAA) Division I men's college lacrosse competition. The Saints play their home games at the Siena Turf Field, which has a capacity of 1,000 spectators. Siena competes as a member of the Metro Atlantic Athletic Conference (MAAC).

The Saints currently possess an all-time record of 204–323 (0.388). Siena appeared in their first MAAC tournament in 2007. In 2009, the Saints won the MAAC championship and earned an automatic qualifier berth for their first NCAA tournament appearance but were defeated in the first round by Syracuse.
