= John Tillman (lacrosse) =

American lacrosse coach (born c. 1970)

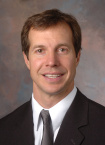
- Tillman as Navy assistant in 2007

Current position
- Title: Head coach
- Team: Maryland
- Conference: Big Ten
- Record: 181–52 (.777)
- Annual salary: $554,000 (contract through 2030)

Playing career
- 1988: Colgate
- 1991: Cornell
- 1997–1999: Baltimore Thunder
- 2000: Washington Power
- Positions: Goalkeeper, defenseman, midfielder

Coaching career (HC unless noted)
- 1992–1995: Ithaca College (asst.)
- 1996–2007: Navy (asst.)
- 2008–2010: Harvard
- 2011–present: Maryland

Head coaching record
- Overall: 201–71 (.739)
- Tournaments: 34–12 (NCAA); 2–2 (ACC); 7–3 (Big Ten)

Accomplishments and honors

Championships
- NCAA (2017, 2022); 4× Big Ten Tournament (2016, 2017, 2021, 2022); ACC Tournament (2011)

Awards
- F. Morris Touchstone Award (2022); 3x Big Ten Coach of the Year (2017, 2018, 2022); ACC Coach of the Year (2014)

John C. Tillman (born c. 1970) is an American lacrosse coach. He is currently the head coach for the University of Maryland Terrapins men's lacrosse team. He previously served as the head coach at Harvard University and as an assistant coach at the Naval Academy and Ithaca College.

== Early life ==
A native of Corning, New York, Tillman served in the United States Navy as a fleet support officer. He attended college at Colgate University before transferring to Cornell University. Upon transferring, he changed his lacrosse position from goalkeeper to defensive midfielder. Tillman earned a varsity letter with the Colgate Raiders in 1988 and with the Cornell Big Red in 1991. He graduated from the Cornell University School of Hotel Administration in 1991.

Tillman played professionally in the National Lacrosse League for the Baltimore Thunder from 1997 to 1999 and the Washington Power in 2000. He also played at the amateur level for the Toyota Lacrosse Club, which won five consecutive Southern Division Championships and a world championship in 2000.

== Coaching career ==
After graduating from college, Tillman worked as an assistant coach at Ithaca College from 1992 to 1995. Tillman then moved to the United States Naval Academy, where he served as an assistant and formulated the offensive game plans for the Midshipmen. In 2002, he was promoted to the position of Head Assistant Coach, and from 2004 to 2007, Navy was one of just five NCAA teams to qualify for the tournament each season. In each of those years, Navy also won both the Patriot League regular season and tournament championships. In 2004, Navy advanced to the NCAA tournament championship game before falling to Syracuse, 14–13.

=== Harvard ===
In September 2007, Harvard University hired Tillman as the Crimson's head coach. In his first season, Harvard finished with a 6–8 record and 1–5 against Ivy League competition. In 2009, Inside Lacrosse magazine ranked Harvard's incoming freshman class as the third-best in the nation. That year, the Crimson improved to an 8–5 record, including 3–3 in the Ivy League. In 2010, Harvard defeated sixth-ranked Princeton for the first time since 1990. The Crimson finished the season with a 6–6 record. He finished his tenure at Harvard with a 20–19 record.

=== Maryland ===
On June 15, 2010, Inside Lacrosse and The Baltimore Sun reported that the University of Maryland had hired Tillman to replace former head coach Dave Cottle. He was signed to a seven-year contract with a base salary of $150,000 per annum. Tillman stated that the long-term contract was the deciding factor in taking the job, rather than remain at Harvard. "I think what it showed me was that the administration at Maryland believed in me."

In his first season at Maryland, Tillman's Terrapins finished with a 13–5 record, the Atlantic Coast Conference tournament championship, and as national runners-up after a loss to Virginia in the NCAA championship game. Tillman inherited an experienced squad with 17 seniors from one of the highest ranked 2007 recruiting classes. Rather than overhaul the team, Tillman made minor adjustments to terminology and refocused the defensive scheme from man-to-man match-ups to team containment. During the postseason, Tillman remained in contact with his two predecessors at Maryland. He discussed his players and their personalities with former coach Dave Cottle, whom he invited to address the team after the regular season in which they lost to four underdog opponents. Tillman also consulted with Hall of Fame inductee Dick Edell, who led Maryland to three finishes as national runners-up. Edell, whose teams lost the championship game in 1995, 1997, and 1998 said, "I will counsel people on the semifinals. I don't have a useful thing to say about the final."

After the season, Navy expressed interest in hiring Tillman as replacement for retired head coach Richie Meade, but he elected to remain at Maryland.

== Personal life ==
He is the brother of Mac and Tim Tillman. He is a practicing Catholic, and entered fully into the Church on April 12, 2026.

== Head coaching record ==
Record table
Season	Team	Overall	Conference	Standing	Postseason
Harvard Crimson (Ivy League) (2008–2010)
2008	Harvard	6–8	1–5	6th	
2009	Harvard	8–5	3–3	4th	
2010	Harvard	6–6	2–4	4th	
Harvard:		20–19 (.513)	6–12 (.333)		
Maryland Terrapins (Atlantic Coast Conference) (2011–2014)
2011	Maryland	13–5	1–2	T–2nd	NCAA Division I runner-up
2012	Maryland	12–6	1–2	T–3rd	NCAA Division I runner-up
2013	Maryland	10–4	2–1	T–1st	NCAA Division I first round
2014	Maryland	13–4	4–1	T–1st	NCAA Division I semifinals
Maryland Terrapins (Big Ten Conference) (2015–present)
2015	Maryland	15–4	4–1	T–1st	NCAA Division I runner-up
2016	Maryland	17–3	5–0	1st	NCAA Division I runner-up
2017	Maryland	16–3	4–1	1st	NCAA Division I champion
2018	Maryland	14–4	4–1	1st	NCAA Division I semifinals
2019	Maryland	12–5	3–2	T–2nd	NCAA Division I quarterfinals
2020	Maryland	5–1	0–0		Season canceled due to COVID-19
2021	Maryland	15–1	10–0	1st	NCAA Division I runner-up
2022	Maryland	18–0	5–0	1st	NCAA Division I champion
2023	Maryland	10–6	3–2	3rd	NCAA Division I first round
2024	Maryland	11–6	3–2	T–2nd	NCAA Division I runner-up
2025	Maryland	14–4	3–2	T–2nd	NCAA Division I runner-up
Maryland:		192–55 (.777)	52–17 (.754)		
Total:		212–74 (.741)			
National champion Postseason invitational champion Conference regular season champion Conference regular season and conference tournament champion Division regular season champion Division regular season and conference tournament champion Conference tournament champion
