= 2019 Big Ten men's lacrosse tournament =

American college lacrosse tournament

Big Ten Conference Men's Lacrosse Tournament
- 2019

Tournament information
- Sport: College lacrosse
- Location: Piscataway, New Jersey
- Established: 2015
- Tournament format: Single elimination
- Host: Rutgers University
- Venue: HighPoint.com Stadium
- Teams: 4
- Website: 2019 Big Ten Tournament Central

Final positions
- Champion: Penn State
- Runner-up: Johns Hopkins

Tournament statistics
- Attendance: 2,775 (Championship game)
- MVP: Mac O'Keefe (Penn State)

The 2019 Big Ten Men's Lacrosse Tournament was held May 2 and May 4 at HighPoint.com Stadium in Piscataway, New Jersey. The winner of the tournament received the Big Ten Conference's automatic bid to the 2019 NCAA Division I Men's Lacrosse Championship. Four teams from the Big Ten conference competed in the single elimination event. The seeds were determined based upon the teams' regular season conference record. Penn State won the tournament, beating Johns Hopkins 18-17.

== Standings ==
Only the top four teams in the Big Ten Conference advanced to the Big Ten Conference Tournament. (Note: The standings in the references includes results of the Big Ten Tournament and NCAA Tournaments.)

Not including Big Ten Tournament and NCAA tournament results

Seed	School	Conference	Overall
1	Penn State ‡	5-0	12–1
2	Johns Hopkins	3–2	7–6
3	Maryland	3-2	11–3
4	Rutgers	2–3	7-7
DNQ	Ohio State	1-4	8-4
DNQ	Michigan	1-4	4-9
‡ Big Ten regular season champions.

== Schedule ==
Session	Game	Time	Matchup	Score	Television
Semifinals – Thursday, May 2
1	1	5:00 pm	#1 Penn State vs. #4 Rutgers	18-6	Big Ten Network
1	2	7:30 pm	#2 Johns Hopkins vs #3 Maryland	12-7	Big Ten Network
Championship – Saturday, May 4
2	3	7:00 pm	#1 Penn State vs. #2 Johns Hopkins	18-17	Big Ten Network
Game times in EST

== Bracket ==
Highpoint.com Stadium – Piscataway, New Jersey

Semifinals; May 2
1	Penn State	18
4	Rutgers	6
2	Johns Hopkins	12
3	Maryland	7

Championship Game; May 4
1	Penn State	18
2	Johns Hopkins	17

== Awards ==
- MVP: Mac O'Keefe, Penn State
- All-Tournament Team
  - Joey Epstein, Johns Hopkins
  - Patrick Foley, Johns Hopkins
  - Cole Williams, Johns Hopkins
  - Danny Dolan, Maryland
  - Grant Ament, Penn State
  - Nick Cardile, Penn State
  - Colby Kneese, Penn State
  - Mac O'Keefe, Penn State
  - Chris Sabia, Penn State
  - Ryan Gallagher, Rutgers
