= 2017 Big Ten men's lacrosse tournament =

American college lacrosse tournament

Big Ten Conference Men's Lacrosse Tournament
- 2017

Tournament information
- Sport: College lacrosse
- Location: Columbus, Ohio
- Established: 2015
- Tournament format: Single elimination
- Host: Ohio State University
- Venue: Jesse Owens Memorial Stadium
- Teams: 4
- Website: OhioStateBuckeyes.com

Final positions
- Champion: Maryland
- Runner-up: Ohio State
- MVP: Connor Kelly (Maryland)

The 2017 Big Ten Men's Lacrosse Tournament was held May 4 and May 6 at Jesse Owens Memorial Stadium in Columbus, Ohio. The winner of the tournament received the Big Ten Conference's automatic bid to the 2017 NCAA Division I Men's Lacrosse Championship. Four teams from the Big Ten conference competed in the single elimination event. The seeds were determined based upon the teams' regular season conference record. Maryland repeated as tournament champions, beating Ohio State 10-9.

== Standings ==
Only the top four teams in the Big Ten Conference advanced to the Big Ten Conference Tournament.

Not including Big Ten Tournament and NCAA tournament results

Seed	School	Conference	Overall
1	Maryland ‡	4–1	10–3
2	Ohio State	3–2	12-3
3	Johns Hopkins	3–2	8–6
4	Penn State	3–2	12–3
DNQ	Rutgers	2–3	10–4
DNQ	Michigan	0–5	8–6
‡ Big Ten regular season champions.

== Schedule ==
Session	Game	Time	Matchup	Score	Television
Semifinals – Thursday, May 4
1	1	5:00 pm	#1 Maryland vs. #4 Penn State	8-6	Big Ten Network
1	2	7:30 pm	#2 Ohio State vs #3 Johns Hopkins	15-13	Big Ten Network
Championship – Saturday, May 6
2	3	7:30 pm	#1 Maryland vs. #2 Ohio State	10-9	Big Ten Network
Game times in EST

== Bracket ==
Jesse Owens Memorial Stadium – Columbus, Ohio

Semifinals; May 4
1	Maryland	8
4	Penn State	6
2	Ohio State	15
3	Johns Hopkins	13

Championship Game; May 6
1	Maryland	10
2	Ohio State	9

== Awards ==
- MVP: Connor Kelly, Maryland
- All-Tournament Team:
  - Connor Kelly, Maryland
  - Tim Rotanz, Maryland
  - Tim Muller, Maryland
  - Dan Morris, Maryland
  - Tre Leclaire, Ohio State
  - Jake Withers, Ohio State
  - Ben Randall, Ohio State
  - Freddy Freibott, Ohio State
  - Shack Stanwick, Johns Hopkins
  - Chris Sabia, Penn State
