= 2018 Big Ten men's lacrosse tournament =

American college lacrosse tournament

Big Ten Conference Men's Lacrosse Tournament
- 2018

Tournament information
- Sport: College lacrosse
- Location: Ann Arbor, Michigan
- Established: 2015
- Tournament format: Single elimination
- Host: University of Michigan
- Venue: U-M Lacrosse Stadium
- Teams: 4
- Website: 2018 Big Ten Tournament Central

Final positions
- Champion: Johns Hopkins
- Runner-up: Maryland

Tournament statistics
- Attendance: 1,292 (Championship game)
- MVP: Brock Turnbaugh

The 2018 Big Ten Men's Lacrosse Tournament was held May 3 and May 5 at U-M Lacrosse Stadium in Ann Arbor, Michigan. The winner of the tournament received the Big Ten Conference's automatic bid to the 2018 NCAA Division I Men's Lacrosse Championship. Four teams from the Big Ten conference competed in the single elimination event. The seeds were determined based upon the teams' regular season conference record. Johns Hopkins won the tournament, beating Maryland 13-10.

== Standings ==
Only the top four teams in the Big Ten Conference advanced to the Big Ten Conference Tournament. (Note: The standings in the reference were updated after Big Ten Tournament semifinals, so it is different from the final standings right after the regular season.)

Not including Big Ten Tournament and NCAA tournament results

Seed	School	Conference	Overall
1	Maryland ‡	4–1	11-2
2	Johns Hopkins	3–2	9-4
3	Ohio State	3–2	8-6
4	Rutgers	2–3	9-5
DNQ	Penn State	2-3	8-6
DNQ	Michigan	1-4	8–6
‡ Big Ten regular season champions.

== Schedule ==
Session	Game	Time	Matchup	Score	Television
Semifinals – Thursday, May 3
1	1	4:00 pm	#1 Maryland vs. #4 Rutgers	12-9	Big Ten Network
1	2	6:30 pm	#2 Johns Hopkins vs #3 Ohio State	6-5	Big Ten Network
Championship – Saturday, May 5
2	3	7:00 pm	#2 Johns Hopkins vs. #1 Maryland	13-10	Big Ten Network
Game times in EST

== Bracket ==
U-M Lacrosse Stadium – Ann Arbor, Michigan

Semifinals; May 3
1	Maryland	12
4	Rutgers	9
2	Johns Hopkins	6
3	Ohio State	5

Championship Game; May 5
1	Maryland	10
2	Johns Hopkins	13

== Awards ==
- MVP: Brock Turnbaugh, Johns Hopkins, Goalie
- All-Tournament Team:
  - Logan Wisnauskas, Maryland, Attack
  - Connor Kelly, Maryland, Midfield
  - Matt Neufeldt, Maryland, Defense
  - Brock Turnbaugh, Johns Hopkins, Goalie
  - Kyle Marr, Johns Hopkins, Attack
  - Cole Williams, Johns Hopkins, Attack
  - Patrick Foley, Johns Hopkins, Defense
  - Robert Kuhn, Johns Hopkins, Defense
  - Alex Bronzo, Rutgers, Defense
  - Erik Evans, Ohio State, Defense
