= 2023 Big Ten men's lacrosse tournament =

American college lacrosse tournament

Big Ten Conference men's lacrosse tournament
- 2023

Tournament information
- Sport: College lacrosse
- Location: Baltimore, Maryland
- Dates: April 29–May 6
- Established: 2015
- Tournament format: Single Elimination
- Host: Johns Hopkins University
- Venue: Homewood Field
- Teams: 6
- Defending champions: Maryland
- Website: 2023 Big Ten Tournament

Final positions
- Champion: Michigan
- Runner-up: Maryland

Tournament statistics
- Attendance: TBD
- Top scorer: TBD

The 2023 Big Ten men's lacrosse tournament was held from April 29 to May 6, 2023. All six teams participated in the tournament while the top two teams in the regular season standings received first round byes. The first round matches were held on the campus of the higher seed teams, and the semifinals and final matches were held at the Homewood Field in Baltimore, Maryland. The seeds were determined based on the teams' regular season conference record.

Michigan defeated Maryland 15-4 to win the tournament. This was Michigan's first Big Ten Conference tournament championship, as a result they received the Big Ten Conference's automatic bid to the 2023 NCAA Division I Men's Lacrosse Championship.

== Regular season standings ==
Penn State earned the #1 seed via head-to-head tiebreaker over Johns Hopkins. Ohio State earned the #5 seed via head-to-head tiebreaker over Rutgers.

Not including Big Ten Tournament and NCAA Tournament results.

Seed	School	Conference	Overall
1	Penn State ‡	4–1	9–3
2	Johns Hopkins	4–1	11–4
3	Maryland	3–2	9–4
4	Michigan	2–3	7–6
5	Ohio State	1–4	5–9
6	Rutgers	1–4	8–6
‡ Big Ten regular season champions.

== Schedule ==
Session	Game	Time	Matchup	Score	Television
First round – Saturday, April 29
1	1	4:00 pm	#4 Michigan vs. #5 Ohio State	14–10	BTN+
1	2	8:00 pm	#3 Maryland vs #6 Rutgers	14–11	BTN
Semifinals – Thursday, May 4
2	3	1:00 pm	#1 Penn State vs. #4 Michigan	15–17	BTN
2	4	3:30 pm	#2 Johns Hopkins vs #3 Maryland	9–14	BTN
Championship – Saturday, May 6
3	5	5:30 pm	#3 Maryland vs #4 Michigan	5–14	BTN
Game times in EST

== Bracket ==
First-round; April 29
4	Michigan	14
5	Ohio State	10
3	Maryland	14
6	Rutgers	11

Semifinals; May 4
1	Penn State	15
4	Michigan	17
2	Johns Hopkins	9
3	Maryland	14

Championship Game; May 6
4	Michigan	14
3	Maryland	5
