= 2015 Big Ten men's lacrosse tournament =

American college lacrosse tournament

Big Ten Conference Men's Lacrosse Tournament
- 2015

Tournament information
- Sport: College lacrosse
- Location: College Park, Maryland
- Established: 2015
- Tournament format: Single elimination
- Host: University of Maryland
- Venue: Byrd Stadium
- Teams: 4
- Website: Big Ten Lacrosse Archives

Final positions
- Champion: Johns Hopkins
- Runner-up: Ohio State
- MVP: Wells Stanwick (Johns Hopkins)

The 2015 Big Ten Men's Lacrosse Tournament took place April 30 to May 2 at Capital One Field at Byrd Stadium in College Park, Maryland. The winner of the tournament received the Big Ten Conference's automatic bid to the 2015 NCAA Division I Men's Lacrosse Championship. Four teams competed in the inaugural Big Ten Conference Men's Lacrosse Tournament in a single elimination format. The seeds were based upon the teams' regular season conference record. Johns Hopkins won the tournament, beating Ohio State 13-6.

== Standings ==
Only the top four teams in the Big Ten Conference advanced to the Big Ten Conference Tournament.

Not including Big Ten Tournament and NCAA tournament results

Seed	School	Conference	Overall
1	Johns Hopkins ‡	4-1	7-6
2	Maryland ‡	4-1	12-2
3	Ohio State	3-2	10-5
4	Penn State	2-3	5-8
DNQ	Michigan	1-4	5-8
DNQ	Rutgers	1-4	5-10
‡ Big Ten regular season champions.

== Schedule ==
Session	Game	Time	Matchup	Score	Television
Semifinals – Thursday, April 30
1	1	5:30 pm	#1 Johns Hopkins vs. #4 Penn State	14-9	Big Ten Network
1	2	8:00 pm	#2 Maryland vs. #3 Ohio State	6-9	Big Ten Network
Championship – Saturday, May 2
2	3	8:00pm	#1 Johns Hopkins vs. #3 Ohio State	13-6	Big Ten Network
Game times in CST

== Bracket ==
Capital One Field at Byrd Stadium – College Park, Maryland

Semifinals; April 30
1	Johns Hopkins	14
4	Penn State	9
2	Maryland	6
3	Ohio State	9

Championship Game; May 2
1	Johns Hopkins	13
3	Ohio State	6

== Awards ==
- MVP: Wells Stanwick, Johns Hopkins
- All-Tournament Team
  - Wells Stanwick, Johns Hopkins
  - Eric Schneider, Johns Hopkins
  - Michael Pellegrino, Johns Hopkins
  - Holden Cattoni, Johns Hopkins
  - Jesse King, Ohio State
  - David Planning, Ohio State
  - Robby Haus, Ohio State
  - Connor Darcey, Penn State
  - Matt Florence, Penn State
  - Bryan Cole, Maryland
