= 2016 Big Ten men's lacrosse tournament =

Big Ten Conference Men's Lacrosse Tournament
- 2016

Tournament information
- Sport: College lacrosse
- Location: Baltimore, Maryland
- Established: 2015
- Tournament format: Single elimination
- Host: Johns Hopkins University
- Venue: Homewood Field
- Teams: 4
- Website: Hopkins Sports 2016 Big Ten Lacrosse Tournament

Final positions
- Champion: Maryland
- Runner-up: Rutgers
- MVP: Matt Rambo

The 2016 Big Ten Men's Lacrosse Tournament was held May 5 to May 7 at Homewood Field in Baltimore, Maryland. The winner of the tournament received the Big Ten Conference's automatic bid to the 2016 NCAA Division I Men's Lacrosse Championship. Four teams from the Big Ten conference competed in the single elimination event. The seeds were based upon the teams' regular season conference record with Penn State winning the head-to-head tie breaker over Ohio State to earn the #4 seed and final spot in the field. In the final, Maryland beat Rutgers 14–8.

== Standings ==
Only the top four teams in the Big Ten Conference advanced to the Big Ten Conference Tournament.

Not including Big Ten Tournament and NCAA tournament results

Seed	School	Conference	Overall
1	Maryland ‡	5–0	12-2
2	Rutgers	3–2	10-4
3	Johns Hopkins	3–2	8–5
4	Penn State	2–3	8–6
DNQ	Ohio State	2–3	7–8
DNQ	Michigan	0–5	3–10
‡ Big Ten regular season champions

== Schedule ==
Session	Game	Time	Matchup	Score	Television
Semifinals – Thursday, May 5
1	1	5:30 pm	#1 Maryland vs. #4 Penn State	16–9	Big Ten Network
1	2	8:00 pm	#2 Rutgers vs. #3 Johns Hopkins	14–12	Big Ten Network
Championship – Saturday, May 7
2	3	6:00pm	#1 Maryland vs. #2 Rutgers	14–8	ESPN2
Game times in EST

== Bracket ==
Homewood Field – Baltimore, Maryland

Semifinals; May 5
1	Maryland	16
4	Penn State	9
2	Rutgers	14
3	Johns Hopkins	12

Championship Game; May 7
1	Maryland	14
2	Rutgers	8

== Awards ==
- MVP: Matt Rambo
- All-Tournament Team
  - Ryan Brown, Johns Hopkins
  - Kyle Bernlohr, Maryland
  - Bryan Cole, Maryland
  - Greg Danseglio, Maryland
  - Connor Kelly, Maryland
  - Matt Rambo, Maryland
  - Nick Aponte, Penn State
  - Scott Bieda, Rutgers
  - Adam Charalambides, Rutgers
  - Zachary Franckowiak, Rutgers
