= 2022 Big Ten men's lacrosse tournament =

American college lacrosse tournament

Big Ten Conference Men's Lacrosse Tournament
- 2022

Tournament information
- Sport: College lacrosse
- Location: College Park, Maryland
- Established: 2015
- Tournament format: Single elimination
- Host(s): University of Maryland, College Park
- Venue: Capital One Field at Maryland Stadium
- Teams: 6
- Website: 2022 Big Ten Tournament

Final positions
- Champion: Maryland
- Runner-up: Rutgers

Tournament statistics
- Attendance: 2,041 (Championship game)
- MVP: Logan Wisnauskas, Maryland

The 2022 Big Ten Men's Lacrosse Tournament was held from Apr 30 to May 7. All six teams participated in the tournament while the top two teams in the regular season standings received first-round byes. The first round matches were held on the campus of the higher seed teams, and the semifinals and final matches were held at the Capital One Field at Maryland Stadium in College Park, Maryland. The tournament's winner received the Big Ten Conference's automatic bid to the 2022 NCAA Division I Men's Lacrosse Championship. The seeds were determined based on the teams' regular season conference record. Maryland won the tournament, beating Rutgers 15–7.

== Regular season standings ==
Not including Big Ten Tournament and NCAA tournament results

Seed	School	Conference	Overall
1	Maryland ‡	5-0	12-0
2	Rutgers	4-1	12-2
3	Ohio State	3-2	9-4
4	Johns Hopkins	2-3	6-8
5	Penn State	1-4	3-10
6	Michigan	0-5	7-7
‡ Big Ten regular season champions.

== Bracket ==
First-round; Apr 30
5	Penn State	8
4	Johns Hopkins	16
6	Michigan	10
3	Ohio State	16

Semifinals; May 5
1	Maryland	16
4	Johns Hopkins	11
2	Rutgers	12
3	Ohio State	'10

Championship Game; May 7
1	Maryland	17
2	Rutgers	7

== Awards ==
- MVP: Logan Wisnauskas, 5th, A, Maryland
- All-Tournament Team
  - Garrett Degnon, Sr., A, Johns Hopkins
  - Anthony DeMaio, 5th, M, Maryland
  - Keegan Khan, Gr., A, Maryland
  - Logan McNaney, Jr., G, Maryland
  - Logan Wisnauskas, 5th, A, Maryland
  - Jackson Reid, Sr., M, Ohio State
  - Skylar Wahlund, Sr., G, Ohio State
  - Mitch Bartolo, Sr., A, Rutgers
  - Colin Kirst, Sr., G, Rutgers
  - Ross Scott, Jr., A, Rutgers

MVP: Logan Wisnauskas, 5th, A, Maryland
