= 2021 Big Ten men's lacrosse tournament =

American college lacrosse tournament

Big Ten Conference Men's Lacrosse Tournament
- 2021

Tournament information
- Sport: College lacrosse
- Location: University Park, Pennsylvania
- Established: 2015
- Tournament format: Single elimination
- Host: Penn State University
- Venue: Panzer Stadium
- Teams: 6
- Website: 2021 Big Ten Tournament

Final positions
- Champion: Maryland
- Runner-up: Johns Hopkins

Tournament statistics
- Attendance: 229 (championship game)
- MVP: Jared Bernhardt, Maryland

The 2021 Big Ten Men's Lacrosse Tournament was held from May 1 to May 8. From this year, all six teams participate in the tournament while the top two teams in the regular season standings received first round byes. The first round matches were held on the campus of the higher seed teams, and the semifinals and final matches were held at the Panzer Stadium in University Park, Pennsylvania. The winner of the tournament received the Big Ten Conference's automatic bid to the 2021 NCAA Division I Men's Lacrosse Championship. The seeds were determined based on the teams' regular season conference record. Maryland won the tournament, beating Johns Hopkins 12–10.

== Regular season standings ==
Penn State earned seed #3 via a head-to-head tiebreaker over Ohio State. Michigan and Johns Hopkins were tied after applying all tiebreaking procedures. Michigan earned seed #5 by coin flip.

Not including Big Ten Tournament and NCAA tournament results

Seed	School	Conference	Overall
1	Maryland ‡	10-0	10-0
2	Rutgers	8-2	8-2
3	Penn State	4-6	4-6
4	Ohio State	4-6	4-6
5	Michigan	2-8	2-8
6	Johns Hopkins	2-8	2-8
‡ Big Ten regular season champions.

== Schedule ==
Session	Game	Time	Matchup	Score	Television
First round – Saturday, May 1
1	1	4:00 pm	#5 Michigan vs. #4 Ohio State	15-11	BTN-FOX Sports Go
1	2	6:00 pm	#6 Johns Hopkins vs #3 Penn State	15-7	BTN-FOX Sports Go
Semifinals – Thursday, May 6
2	3	5:00 pm	#1 Maryland vs. #5 Michigan	16-8	BTN-FOX Sports Go
2	4	7:30 pm	#6 Johns Hopkins vs #2 Rutgers	12-10	BTN-FOX Sports Go
Championship – Saturday, May 8
3	5	8:00 pm	#1 Maryland vs. #6 Johns Hopkins	12-10	BTN-FOX Sports Go
Game times in EST

== Bracket ==
First-round; May 1
4	Ohio State	11
5	Michigan	15
3	Penn State	7
6	Johns Hopkins	15

Semifinals; May 6
1	Maryland	16
5	Michigan	8
2	Rutgers	10
6	Johns Hopkins	12

Championship Game; May 8
1	Maryland	12
6	Johns Hopkins	10

== Awards ==
- MVP: Jared Bernhardt, Maryland
- All-Tournament Team
  - Garrett Degnon, Jr., M, Johns Hopkins
  - Matt Narewski, Jr., FO, Johns Hopkins
  - Jared Reinson, Sr., D, Johns Hopkins
  - Jared Bernhardt, Sr., A, Maryland
  - Anthony DeMaio, Sr., M, Maryland
  - John Geppert, Jr., LSM, Maryland
  - Nick Grill, Sr., D, Maryland
  - Brett Makar, Jr., D, Maryland
  - Josh Zawada, So., A, Michigan
  - Brennan Kamish, Sr., SSDM, Rutgers
