= Big Ten men's lacrosse tournament =

Big Ten Conference men's lacrosse tournament
- Tournament logo
- Sport: College lacrosse
- Conference: Big Ten Conference
- Number of teams: 6
- Format: Single-elimination tournament
- Current stadium: HighPoint.com Stadium
- Current location: Piscataway, New Jersey
- Played: 2015–present
- Last contest: 2026
- Current champion: Penn State
- Most championships: Maryland (4)
- TV partner(s): Big Ten Network (2015-present), ESPN2 (2016)
- Official website: 2023 Tournament Central

The Big Ten men's lacrosse tournament in the United States started in 2015 in the first year the conference sponsored men's lacrosse. Until 2019, the top four teams from the regular season qualified for the tournament. From the 2021 tournament, all six teams advance to the tournament while the top 2 teams are given a bye to the semifinals. The winner of the tournament receives the conference's automatic bid into the NCAA Men's Lacrosse Championship.

== Tournament champions ==
Year	Champion	Runner-up	Score	Location
2015	Johns Hopkins	Ohio State	13–6	Capital One Field at Byrd Stadium, College Park, Maryland
2016	Maryland	Rutgers	14–8	Homewood Field, Baltimore, Maryland
2017	Maryland (2)	Ohio State	10–9	Jesse Owens Memorial Stadium, Columbus, Ohio
2018	Johns Hopkins (2)	Maryland	13-10	U-M Lacrosse Stadium, Ann Arbor, Michigan
2019	Penn State	Johns Hopkins	18–17 (OT)	HighPoint.com Stadium, Piscataway, New Jersey
2020	Cancelled due to the COVID-19 pandemic			
2021	Maryland (3)	Johns Hopkins	12–10	Panzer Stadium, State College, Pennsylvania
2022	Maryland (4)	Rutgers	17–7	Capital One Field at Byrd Stadium, College Park, Maryland
2023	Michigan	Maryland	14–5	Homewood Field, Baltimore, Maryland
2024	Michigan (2)	Penn State	16–4	OSU Lacrosse Stadium, Columbus, Ohio
2025	Ohio State	Maryland	14–10	U-M Lacrosse Stadium, Ann Arbor, Michigan
2026	Penn State (2)	Johns Hopkins	16–8	SHI Stadium, Piscataway, New Jersey

== Tournament history by school ==
School	Championships	Runners-up
Maryland	4	3
Johns Hopkins	2	3
Penn State	2	1
Michigan	2	0
Ohio State	1	2
Rutgers	0	2
