= Harvard Crimson men's lacrosse =

- Founded: 1878; 148 years ago
- University: Harvard University
- Head coach: Gerry Byrne
- Stadium: Jordan Field (capacity: 2,500)
- Location: Cambridge, Massachusetts
- Conference: Ivy League
- Nickname: Crimson
- Colors: Crimson, white, and black

Pre-NCAA era championships
- (13) - 1881, 1882, 1885, 1886, 1887, 1905, 1908, 1909, 1910, 1911, 1912, 1913, 1915

NCAA Tournament Quarterfinals
- (3) - 1980, 1990, 1996

NCAA Tournament appearances
- (8) - 1980, 1988, 1990, 1996, 2006, 2014, 2022, 2025

Conference regular season championships
- (4) - 1964, 1980, 1990, 2014

The Harvard Crimson men's lacrosse team represents Harvard University in National Collegiate Athletic Association (NCAA) Division I men's lacrosse. Harvard competes as a member of the Ivy League and plays its home games at Jordan Field and Harvard Stadium in Cambridge, Massachusetts.

== History ==
=== 19th century ===
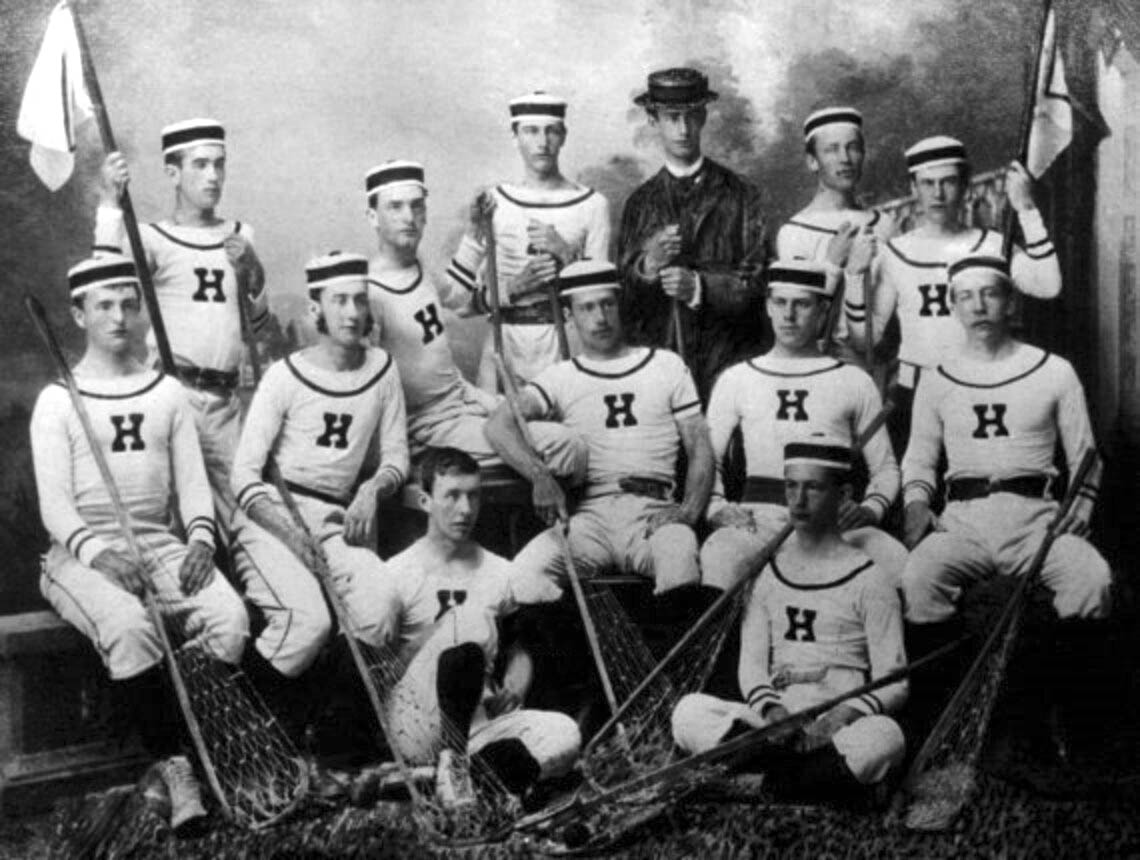
Harvard lacrosse team of 1881

Harvard fielded its first lacrosse team in 1878, and the following year, joined the United States National Amateur Lacrosse Association alongside New York University and nine club teams. In 1881, Harvard defeated Princeton to win the first intercollegiate lacrosse tournament.

In 1882, the Intercollegiate Lacrosse Association was formed, and the following season also inducted the newly established Yale lacrosse team. Harvard and Princeton dominated the league throughout the 1880s, and the Crimson claimed the title in 1882, 1885, 1886, and 1887.

=== 20th century ===
The United States Intercollegiate Lacrosse League (USILL) was formed in 1905, divided into a Northern Division and Southern Division. Championships were awarded in each division based on record and strength of schedule. Harvard was named the Northern Division champions six consecutive seasons from 1908 to 1913, and again in 1915.

In 1941, Navy refused to play the integrated Harvard team, so its athletic director ordered home its one black player rather than forfeit the game. The Crimson secured the Ivy League championship with the best league record in 1964*, 1980*, 1990*, and 2014* (* denotes title shared with at least one other team). In 1971, the NCAA established the national championship tournament. Harvard made its first appearance in 1980, when it lost in the first round to Johns Hopkins, 16–12. The Crimson returned to the event in 1988 and were edged, 10–9, by Navy in the opening round. In 1990, Harvard won its first NCAA tournament game when it defeated Notre Dame, 9–3. In the quarterfinals, the Crimson were beaten handily, 18–3, by North Carolina. Harvard returned to the quarterfinals in 1996, after beating Hofstra, 15–12, and then fell to eventual national runners-up Virginia, 23–12.

=== 21st century ===
After their 1996 appearance, the Crimson did not reach the tournament for another decade; when they were beaten in the 2006 first round by Syracuse, 11–4.

== Head coaches ==
- Unknown (1881–1902)
- McConaghy (1903)
- Unknown (1904–1909)
- E. A. Menary (1910)
- Unknown (1911–1916)
- No team (1917–1918)
- Michael H. Cochrane (1919)
- Paul Gustafson (1920–1923)
- Unknown (1924)
- Irving Lydecker (1925–1926)
- Talbot Hunter (1927)
- Talbot Hunter & H. W. Jeffers (1928)
- Madison Sayles and E. F. Gamache (1929)
- Madison Sayles (1930–1932)
- Robert Poole (1933–1935)
- Neil Stahley (1936–1939)
- John Witherspoon (1940–1941)
- Benjamin R. Martin (1942–1943)
- No team (1944–1946)
- Robert Maddux (1947–1948)
- J. Bruce Munro (1949–1974)
- Bob Scalise (1975–1987)
- Scott Anderson (1988–2007)
- John Tillman (2008–2010)
- Chris Wojcik (2011–19)
- Gerry Byrne (2019–present)

== Season results ==
The following is a list of Harvard's results by season as an NCAA Division I program:

Season	Coach	Overall	Conference	Standing	Postseason
Bruce Munro (Ivy League) (1949–1974)
1971	Bruce Munro	8–3	4–2	3rd	
1972	Bruce Munro	3–8	1–5	6th	
1973	Bruce Munro	3–10	2–4	T–4th	
1974	Bruce Munro	3–6	2–4	5th	
Bruce Munro:		172–167–7 (.507)	37–63–1 (.371)		
Bob Scalise (Ivy League) (1975–1987)
1975	Bob Scalise	4–7	1–5	6th	
1976	Bob Scalise	10–5	3–3	T–3rd	
1977	Bob Scalise	4–8	1–5	T–5th	
1978	Bob Scalise	10–4	5–1	2nd	
1979	Bob Scalise	10–4	4–2	T–2nd	
1980	Bob Scalise	11–3	5–1	T–1st	NCAA Division I Quarterfinals
1981	Bob Scalise	4–8	2–4	T–5th	
1982	Bob Scalise	9–4	4–2	T–2nd	
1983	Bob Scalise	6–8	1–5	6th	
1984	Bob Scalise	8–6	3–3	4th	
1985	Bob Scalise	3–11	0–6	7th	
1986	Bob Scalise	9–5	4–2	T–2nd	
1987	Bob Scalise	10–4	4–2	T–2nd	
Bob Scalise:		98–77 (.560)	37–41 (.474)		
Scott Anderson (Ivy League) (1988–2007)
1988	Scott Anderson	11–4	4–2	3rd	NCAA Division I First Round
1989	Scott Anderson	7–7	2–4	T–5th	
1990	Scott Anderson	12–3	5–1	T–1st	NCAA Division I Quarterfinals
1991	Scott Anderson	3–10	2–4	T–5th	
1992	Scott Anderson	4–9	1–5	6th	
1993	Scott Anderson	7–8	2–4	T–5th	
1994	Scott Anderson	5–8	2–4	5th	
1995	Scott Anderson	8–5	4–2	3rd	
1996	Scott Anderson	12–3	5–1	2nd	NCAA Division I Quarterfinals
1997	Scott Anderson	8–6	4–2	T–2nd	
1998	Scott Anderson	11–3	5–1	2nd	
1999	Scott Anderson	3–10	1–5	7th	
2000	Scott Anderson	7–6	3–3	T–3rd	
2001	Scott Anderson	8–7	2–4	T–5th	
2002	Scott Anderson	8–7	1–5	6th	
2003	Scott Anderson	5–10	1–5	T–6th	
2004	Scott Anderson	7–6	2–4	T–5th	
2005	Scott Anderson	5–8	2–4	T–5th	
2006	Scott Anderson	6–7	3–3	T–4th	NCAA Division I First Round
2007	Scott Anderson	5–7	3–3	T–3rd	
Scott Anderson:		142–134 (.514)	54–66 (.450)		
John Tillman (Ivy League) (2008–2010)
2008	John Tillman	6–8	1–5	6th	
2009	John Tillman	8–5	3–3	4th	
2010	John Tillman	6–6	2–4	T–5th	
John Tillman:		20–19 (.513)	6–12 (.333)		
Chris Wojcik (Ivy League) (2011–2019)
2011	Chris Wojcik	10–6	3–3	T–3rd	
2012	Chris Wojcik	6–8	2–4	5th	
2013	Chris Wojcik	6–8	2–4	T–5th	
2014	Chris Wojcik	10–7	5–1	T–1st	NCAA Division I First Round
2015	Chris Wojcik	7–7	2–4	6th	
2016	Chris Wojcik	8–8	3–3	4th	
2017	Chris Wojcik	6–7	2–4	6th	
2018	Chris Wojcik	7–6	2–4	6th	
2019	Chris Wojcik	5–8	1–5	6th	
Chris Wojcik:		65–65 (.500)	22–32 (.407)		
Gerry Byrne (Ivy League) (2020–Present)
2020	Gerry Byrne	2–2	†	†	†
2021	Gerry Byrne	0–0	††	††	††
2022	Gerry Byrne	8–5	3–3	T–4th	NCAA Division I First Round
2023	Gerry Byrne	5–7	2–4	T–5th	
2024	Gerry Byrne	8–5	2–4	T–5th	
2025	Gerry Byrne	10–5	4–2	3rd	NCAA Division I First Round
2026	Gerry Byrne	9–5	3–3	T–4th	
Gerry Byrne:		42–29 (.592)	14–16 (.467)		
Total:		742–730–22 (.504)			
National champion Postseason invitational champion Conference regular season champion Conference regular season and conference tournament champion Division regular season champion Division regular season and conference tournament champion Conference tournament champion

†NCAA canceled 2020 collegiate activities due to the COVID-19 virus.
†† Ivy League cancelled 2021 collegiate season due to the COVID-19 virus.
