= Jeff Tambroni =

American college lacrosse coach

Current position
- Title: Head Coach
- Team: Penn State Nittany Lions

Biographical details
- Education: Hobart

Coaching career (HC unless noted)
- 1993-1996: Hobart (assistant)
- 1997: Loyola College (assistant)
- 1997-2000: Cornell (assistant)
- 2001-2010: Cornell
- 2010-present: Penn State

Jeff Tambroni is an American college lacrosse coach. He is currently the head coach of the Penn State Nittany Lions men's lacrosse team.

== Playing career ==
Tambroni played college lacrosse for the Hobart Statesmen. With Hobart, Tambroni was recognized as one of the greatest players in Hobart lacrosse history, earning three All-America awards and three national championships. He was known as a dual-threat attackmen, excelling in scoring and passing.

== Coaching career ==
Tambroni has been the head coach for Penn State men's lacrosse since 2010, in his 16th season in 2026.

Prior to coaching at Penn State, Tambroni was the head coach at Cornell from 2001 to 2010.

He was an assistant for the Cornell Big Red from 1997-2000, an assistant at Loyola College in 1997 and an assistant at his alma mater the Hobart Statesmen for three seasons (1993-1996).
