= 2013 NCAA Division I men's lacrosse tournament =

- Teams: 16
- Finals site: Lincoln Financial Field, Philadelphia, PA
- Champions: Duke (2nd title)
- Runner-up: Syracuse (17th title game)
- Semifinalists: Cornell (13th Final Four); Denver (2nd Final Four)
- Winning coach: John Danowski (2nd title)
- MOP: Brendan Fowler, Duke
- Attendance: 28,444 semi-finals 28,224 finals 56,668 total
- Top scorers: Wesley Berg, Denver; Steve Mock, Cornell (12 goals)

The 2013 NCAA Division I Men's Lacrosse Championship was the 43rd annual single–elimination tournament to determine the national championship for National Collegiate Athletic Association (NCAA) Division I men's college lacrosse. Sixteen teams were selected to compete in the tournament based upon their performance during the regular season, and for some, by means of a conference tournament automatic qualifier. The Divisions I men’s lacrosse committees announced the matchups (16 teams, eight games) on 5 May 2013. Duke defeated Loyola, Notre Dame, Cornell, and Syracuse to capture to their second NCAA Championship.

== Tournament overview ==
The tournament started on May 11 and ended on May 27 with the championship game at Lincoln Financial Field in Philadelphia, Pennsylvania.

Schools from eight conferences, America East, Big East, Colonial Athletic Association (CAA), ECAC Lacrosse League (ECAC), Ivy League, Metro Atlantic Athletic Conference (MAAC), Northeast Conference (NEC), and Patriot League, earned automatic bids into the tournament by winning their respective conference tournaments, leaving eight remaining at-large bids for top ranked teams. Albany (America East), Syracuse (Big East), Towson (CAA), Ohio State (ECAC), Yale (Ivy), Detroit Mercy (MAAC), Bryant (NEC), and Lehigh (Patriot) received automatic bids.

== Teams ==
Seed	School	Conference	Berth Type	RPI	Record
1	Syracuse	Big East	Automatic	3	13–3
2	Notre Dame	Big East	At-large	1	10–4
3	Ohio State	ECAC	Automatic	2	12–3
4	Denver	ECAC	At-large	5	12–4
5	North Carolina	ACC	At-large	4	12–3
6	Maryland	ACC	At-large	6	10–3
7	Duke	ACC	At-large	12	12–5
8	Penn State	CAA	At-large	9	12–4
	Yale	Ivy	Automatic	7	11–4
	Cornell	Ivy	At-large	8	12–3
	Loyola	ECAC	At-large	10	11–4
	Albany	America East	Automatic	13	13–4
	Lehigh	Patriot	Automatic	15	12–4
	Towson	CAA	Automatic	23	10–7
	Bryant	NEC	Automatic	43	8–10
	Detroit Mercy	MAAC	Automatic	51	5–9

== Tournament bracket ==
First Round; May 11–12
1	Syracuse	12
Bryant	7
8	Penn State	7
Yale	10
4	Denver	19
Albany	14
5	North Carolina	16
Lehigh	7
3	Ohio State	16
Towson	6
6	Maryland	8
Cornell	16
7	Duke	12†
Loyola	11
2	Notre Dame	9
Detroit Mercy	7

Quarterfinals; May 18–19
1	Syracuse	7
Yale	6
4	Denver	12
5	North Carolina	11
3	Ohio State	6
Cornell	16
7	Duke	12
2	Notre Dame	11

Semifinals; May 25
1	Syracuse	9
4	Denver	8
Cornell	14
7	Duke	16

Final; May 27
1	Syracuse	10
7	Duke	16

- † = Double Overtime

== Returning All-Americans in the NCAA tournament ==
There are thirteen players on the top five teams in division I men's lacrosse (North Carolina, Cornell, Denver, Loyola (Md.) and Syracuse) that were All-Americans in the 2012 season. The only player on one of the top five teams that was a first-team All American in 2012 is RG Keenan from North Carolina. Cornell attackman Rob Pannell was a first-team All American in 2010 and 2011, but missed most of the 2012 season due to a broken foot.

Name	School	2012 All-American team	Position	Class	Notes
Jimmy Bitter	North Carolina	Honorable mention	Attack	Sophomore	
Ryan Creighton	North Carolina	Honorable mention	Midfield	Junior	
Marcus Holman	North Carolina	2nd team	Attack	Senior	2013 Tewaaraton nominee
RG Keenan	North Carolina	1st team	Face off	Junior	
Jason Noble	Cornell	2nd team	Defense	Senior	
Chase Carraro	Denver	2nd team	Face off	Senior	
Cam Flint	Denver	Honorable mention	Midfield	Senior	
Jeremy Noble	Denver	3rd team	Midfield	Junior	Has not played in a game since 16 March 2013
Reid Acton	Loyola	Honorable mention	Defense	Senior	
Joe Fletcher	Loyola	Honorable mention	Defense	Junior	
Scott Ratliff	Loyola	3rd team	Long-stick midfield	Senior	2013 Tewaaraton nominee
Mike Sawyer	Loyola	2nd team	Attack	Senior	2013 Tewaaraton nominee
Brian Megill	Syracuse	2nd team	Defense	Senior	2013 Tewaaraton nominee

== Tewaaraton Award nominees in NCAA tournament ==
There are eight players on the top five teams in division I men's lacrosse (North Carolina, Cornell, Denver, Loyola (Md.) and Syracuse) that were nominees for the annual Tewaaraton award given to the best college lacrosse player.

Name	School	Position	Class	Notes
Marcus Holman	North Carolina	Attack	Senior	Repeat nominee
Steve Mock	Cornell	Attack	Senior	
Rob Pannell	Cornell	Attack	Senior	Three-time All-American (2009, 2010 and 2011), Player of the year in 2011, #3 in D-1 points per game in 2013
Eric Law	Denver	Attack	Senior	
Scott Ratliff	Loyola	Long-stick midfield	Senior	Repeat nominee
Mike Sawyer	Loyola	Attack	Senior	Repeat nominee
JoJo Marasco	Syracuse	Midfield	Senior	2011 All-American (attack, honorable mention)
Brian Megill	Syracuse	Defense	Senior	Repeat nominee

== Major League Lacrosse players (drafted) in NCAA tournament ==
Major League Lacrosse holds its draft in January each year and selects from collegiate players that are playing their final year of eligibility.

Player name	School	Draft year	Position	MLL team
Jason Noble	Cornell	2013	Defense	Hamilton Nationals
Rob Pannell	Cornell	2013	Attack	New York Lizards
Max Van Bourgondien	Cornell	2013	Midfield	Charlotte Hounds
Chase Carraro	Denver	2013	Midfield	Ohio Machine
Cameron Flint	Denver	2013	Midfield	Boston Cannons
Eric Law	Denver	2013	Attack	Ohio Machine
Reid Acton	Loyola	2013	Defense	Hamilton Nationals
Davis Butts	Loyola	2013	Midfield	Denver Outlaws
Josh Hawkins	Loyola	2013	Midfield	Hamilton Nationals
Scott Ratliff	Loyola	2013	Long-stick midfield	Boston Cannons
Mike Sawyer	Loyola	2013	Attack	Charlotte Hounds
Marcus Holman	North Carolina	2013	Attack	Ohio Machine
JoJo Marasco	Syracuse	2013	Midfield	New York Lizards
Brian Megill	Syracuse	2013	Defense	Denver Outlaws

== All–Tournament ==
- Brendan Fowler, M, Duke (Most Outstanding Player)
- Jordan Wolf, A, Duke
- David Lawson, M, Duke
- Jake Tripucka, M, Duke
- JoJo Marasco, A, Syracuse
- Sean Young, D, Syracuse
- Dylan Donahue, A, Syracuse
- Dominic LaMolinara, G, Syracuse
- Rob Pannell, A, Cornell
- Eric Law, A, Denver
