= Monmouth Hawks men's lacrosse =

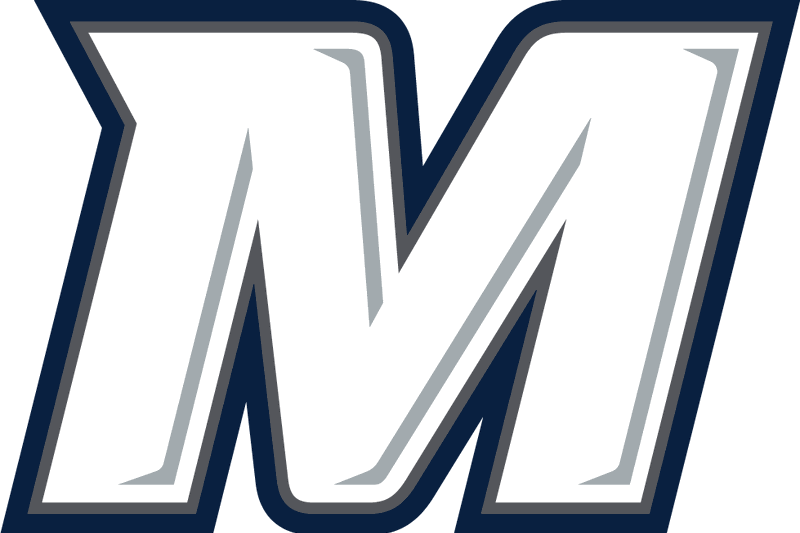
- Founded: 2012; 14 years ago
- University: Monmouth University
- Athletic director: Marilyn McNeil
- Head coach: Brian Fisher (8th season)
- Stadium: Kessler Stadium (capacity: 4,100)
- Location: West Long Branch, New Jersey
- Conference: Colonial Athletic Association
- Nickname: Hawks
- Colors: Midnight blue and white

NCAA Tournament appearances
- (2) - 2017, 2021

Conference Tournament championships
- (2) - 2017, 2021

Conference regular season championships
- (1) - 2017, 2021

The Monmouth Hawks men's lacrosse team represents Monmouth University in NCAA Division I men's lacrosse. Monmouth currently competes as a member of the Colonial Athletic Association (CAA) and plays its home games at Kessler Stadium in West Long Branch, New Jersey. Monmouth made its first NCAA tournament appearance in 2017 and returned to the tournament in 2021.

== History ==
Lacrosse was established at Monmouth in 2012 under coach Brian Fisher and played its first season in 2014. Monmouth had its finest season in 2017, finishing the year 14-4, and falling to Bryant 10-7 in the NCAA Tournament Opening Round.

Monmouth returned to the NCAA Tournament in 2021 finishing 8-3, winning the MAAC Championship and losing to top seed North Carolina in the NCAA Tournament 1st round.

== Season Results ==
The following is a list of Monmouth's results by season as an NCAA Division I program:

Season	Coach	Overall	Conference	Standing	Postseason
Brian Fisher (Metro Atlantic Athletic Conference) (2014–2022)
2014	Brian Fisher	0–13	0–6	7th	
2015	Brian Fisher	6–8	3–3	4th	
2016	Brian Fisher	7–7	3–3	T-3rd	
2017	Brian Fisher	14–4	6–0	1st	NCAA Division I play-in game
2018	Brian Fisher	7–8	4–2	3rd	
2019	Brian Fisher	4–8	3–4	5th	
2020	Brian Fisher	2–4	0–0	†	†
2021	Brian Fisher	8–3	4–2	T-1st	NCAA Division I First Round
2022	Brian Fisher	5–7	2–4	5th	
Brian Fisher (Colonial Athletic Conference) (2023–present)
2023	Brian Fisher	5–9	1–6	7th	
2024	Brian Fisher	5–8	5–7	T-7th	
2025	Brian Fisher	5–9	2–5	7th	
Brian Fisher:		73–88 (.453)	33–42 (.440)		
Total:		73–88 (.453)			
National champion Postseason invitational champion Conference regular season champion Conference regular season and conference tournament champion Division regular season champion Division regular season and conference tournament champion Conference tournament champion

†NCAA canceled 2020 collegiate activities due to the COVID-19 virus.

== See also ==
- College men's lacrosse teams in the United States
