= 2025 NCAA Division I men's lacrosse tournament =

Lacrosse tournament in Boston

- Dates: May 7–26, 2025
- Teams: 18
- Finals site: Gillette Stadium, Foxborough, Massachusetts
- Champions: Cornell (4th title)
- Runner-up: Maryland (18th title game)
- Semifinalists: Penn State (3rd Final Four); Syracuse (27th Final Four)
- Winning coach: Connor Buczek (1st title)
- MOP: CJ Kirst, Cornell
- Attendance: 31,524 semi-finals 32,512 finals 64,036 total
- Top scorer: CJ Kirst, Cornell (14 goals)

The 2025 NCAA Division I Men's Lacrosse Championship was the 54th annual single-elimination tournament to determine the national championship for NCAA Division I men's college lacrosse. The semifinals and final were hosted by Harvard University and were held at Gillette Stadium in Foxborough, Massachusetts. Cornell captured the school's 4th lacrosse title, and first since 1977, with a 13–10 win over Maryland. CJ Kirst scored six goals in the final, tying the all-time single-season NCAA scoring record.

== Format ==
Eighteen (18) teams competed in the tournament based upon their performance during the regular season. For ten (10) conferences, entry into the tournament was by means of a conference tournament automatic qualifier, while the remaining eight (8) teams, at-large selection was determined by the NCAA selection committee.

== Teams ==
| Seed | School | Conference | Berth Type | RPI | Regular season record |
|---|---|---|---|---|---|
| 1 | Cornell Big Red | Ivy League | Automatic | 1 | 15–1 |
| 2 | Maryland Terrapins | Big Ten | At-large | 2 | 12–4 |
| 3 | Princeton Tigers | Ivy League | At-large | 3 | 13–4 |
| 4 | Ohio State Buckeyes | Big Ten | Automatic | 5 | 14–2 |
| 5 | Penn State Nittany Lions | Big Ten | At-large | 4 | 10–5 |
| 6 | Syracuse Orange | ACC | At-large | 6 | 12–5 |
| 7 | Duke Blue Devils | ACC | At-large | 7 | 12–5 |
| 8 | North Carolina Tar Heels | ACC | At-large | 9 | 10–4 |
| | Richmond Spiders | Atlantic 10 | Automatic | 8 | 13–3 |
| | Notre Dame Fighting Irish | ACC | At-large | 10 | 8–4 |
| | Harvard Crimson | Ivy League | At-large | 11 | 10–4 |
| | Colgate Raiders | Patriot League | Automatic | 15 | 10–7 |
| | Georgetown Hoyas | Big East | Automatic | 16 | 11–4 |
| | Towson Tigers | CAA | Automatic | 19 | 11–5 |
| | Siena Saints | MAAC | Automatic | 25 | 11–4 |
| | Robert Morris Colonials | Northeast | Automatic | 26 | 11–5 |
| | Albany Great Danes | America East | Automatic | 37 | 9–8 |
| | Air Force Falcons | Atlantic Sun | Automatic | 38 | 8–7 |

== Bracket ==
Opening Round; May 7, ESPNU; Hosted by seeded team
Albany | 11
Siena | 9
Robert Morris | 9
Air Force | 14

First round May 10–11, ESPN2 & ESPNU; Hosted by seeded team
1 | Cornell | 15
Albany | 6
8 | North Carolina | 10
Richmond | 13
5 | Penn State | 13
Colgate | 11
4 | Ohio State | 6
Notre Dame | 15
2 | Maryland | 13
Air Force | 5
7 | Duke | 12
Georgetown | 16
6 | Syracuse | 13*
Harvard | 12
3 | Princeton | 22
Towson | 12

Quarterfinals; May 17–18, ESPNU; Hempstead, NY and Annapolis, MD
1 | Cornell | 13
Richmond | 12
5 | Penn State | 14
Notre Dame | 12
2 | Maryland | 9
Georgetown | 6
6 | Syracuse | 19
3 | Princeton | 18

Semifinals; May 24, ESPN2; Foxborough, MA
1 | Cornell | 11
5 | Penn State | 9
2 | Maryland | 14
6 | Syracuse | 8

National Championship; May 26, ESPN; Foxborough, MA
1 | Cornell | 13
2 | Maryland | 10

* denotes overtime period

== Tournament Boxscores ==
=== Final ===
| Team | 1 | 2 | 3 | 4 | Total |
|---|---|---|---|---|---|
| Maryland (14-4) | 1 | 4 | 2 | 3 | 10 |
| Cornell | 2 | 4 | 3 | 4 | 13 |
Maryland scoring: Zach Whittier 2, Eric Spanos 2, Braden Erksa 2, Bryce Ford, Daniel Kelly, Jack Schultz, Elijah Stobaugh; Cornell scoring: CJ Kirst 6, Ryan Goldstein 4, Andrew Dalton, Ryan Waldman, Brian Luzzi; Shots: Maryland - 39, Cornell - 45; Saves: Maryland - Logan McNaney 11 ; Cornell - Wyatt Knust 12; Attendance: 32,512 -- 5/26/2025 Foxborough, Massachusetts. (Gillette Stadium)

=== Semifinals ===
| Team | 1 | 2 | 3 | 4 | Total |
|---|---|---|---|---|---|
| Syracuse (13-6) | 1 | 1 | 3 | 3 | 8 |
| Maryland | 3 | 5 | 3 | 3 | 14 |
Syracuse scoring: Michael Leo 2, Finn Thomson 2, Luke Rhoa, Sam English, Owen Hiltz, John Mullen; Maryland scoring: Eric Spanos 4, Bryce Ford 2, Daniel Kelly 2, AJ Larkin 2, Braden Erksa, Aidan Aitken, Elijah Stobaugh, Luca Ward; Shots: Syracuse - 39, Maryland - 41; Saves: Syracuse - Jimmy McCool 12 ; Maryland - Logan McNaney 14; Attendance: 31,524 -- 5/24/2025 Foxborough, Massachusetts. (Gillette Stadium)

| Team | 1 | 2 | 3 | 4 | Total |
|---|---|---|---|---|---|
| Cornell | 1 | 3 | 6 | 1 | 11 |
| Penn State (12-5) | 0 | 5 | 1 | 3 | 9 |
Cornell scoring: Hugh Kelleher 3, Michael Long 2, Willem Firth, Brendan Staub, Ryan Goldstein, Ryan Waldman, Jack Cascaddan, Brian Luzzi; Penn State scoring: Liam Matthews 4, Matt Traynor 2, Ethan Long, Kyle Lehman, Will Peden; Shots: Cornell - 35 , Penn State - 26; Saves: Cornell - Wyatt Knust 9 ; Penn State - Jack Fracyon 8; Attendance: 31,524 -- 5/24/2025 Foxborough, Massachusetts. (Gillette Stadium)

=== Quarterfinals ===
| Team | 1 | 2 | 3 | 4 | Total |
|---|---|---|---|---|---|
| Maryland | 2 | 3 | 1 | 3 | 9 |
| Georgetown (12-5) | 0 | 4 | 1 | 1 | 6 |
Maryland scoring: Braden Erksa 3, Daniel Kelly 2, Zach Whittier, Bryce Ford, Eric Spanos, Geordy Holmes; Georgetown scoring: Aidan Carroll 2, Lucas Dudemaine 2, Kade Goldberg, Fulton Bayman; Shots: Maryland - 40 , Georgetown - 30; Saves: Maryland - Logan McNaney 11 ; Georgetown - Anderson Moore 12; Attendance: 17,721 -- 5/18/2025 Annapolis, Maryland. (Navy–Marine Corps Memorial Stadium)

| Team | 1 | 2 | 3 | 4 | Total |
|---|---|---|---|---|---|
| Penn State | 2 | 1 | 6 | 5 | 14 |
| Notre Dame (9-5) | 3 | 5 | 4 | 0 | 12 |
Penn State scoring: Matt Traynor 6, Ethan Long 3, Kyle Lehman 3, Liam Matthews, Hunter Aquino; Notre Dame scoring: Devon McLane 3, Chris Kavanagh 3, Jake Taylor 2, Will Angrick, Will Maheras, Jalen Seymour, Luke Miller; Shots: Penn State - 38 , Notre Dame - 40; Saves: Penn State - Jack Fracyon 9 ; Notre Dame - Thomas Ricciardelli 10; Attendance: 17,721 -- 5/18/2025 Annapolis, Maryland. (Navy–Marine Corps Memorial Stadium)

| Team | 1 | 2 | 3 | 4 | Total |
|---|---|---|---|---|---|
| Syracuse | 6 | 4 | 6 | 3 | 19 |
| Princeton (13-4) | 5 | 6 | 1 | 6 | 18 |
Syracuse scoring: Joey Spallina 4, Michael Leo 3, Owen Hiltz 3, Sam English 2, Finn Thomson 2, Payton Anderson 2, Tyler McCarthy, John Mullen, Trey Deere; Princeton scoring: Chad Palumbo 6, Peter Buonanno 3, Coulter Mackesy 3, Tucker Wade, Colikn Burns, Nate Kabiri, Sean Cameron, John Dunphey, Cooper Mueller; Shots: Syracuse - 51 , Princeton - 42; Saves: Syracuse - Jimmy McCool 12, Michael Ippolita 1; Princeton - Ryan Croddick 13; Attendance: 8,209 -- 5/17/2025 Hempstead, New York. (James M. Shuart Stadium)

| Team | 1 | 2 | 3 | 4 | Total |
|---|---|---|---|---|---|
| Cornell | 2 | 3 | 3 | 4 | 13 |
| Richmond (14-4) | 3 | 3 | 4 | 2 | 12 |
Cornell scoring: Ryan Goldstein 4, Andrew Dalton 3, CJ Kirst 2, Brendan Staub, Willem Firth, TJ Lamb, Walker Schwarz; Richmond scoring: Max Merklinger 3, Joe Sheridan 2, Lukas Olsson, Aidan O'Neil, Charlie Packard, Gavin Creo, Daniel Picart, Henry Alpaugh, Leo Caine; Shots: Cornell - 50, Richmond - 35; Saves: Cornell - Wyatt Knust 5 ; Richmond - Zach Vigue 14; Attendance: 8,209 -- 5/17/2025 Hempstead, New York. (James M. Shuart Stadium)

=== First Round ===
| Team | 1 | 2 | 3 | 4 | Total |
|---|---|---|---|---|---|
| Cornell | 3 | 2 | 4 | 6 | 15 |
| Albany (10-9) | 1 | 2 | 1 | 2 | 6 |
Cornell scoring: CJ Kirst 6, Hugh Kelleher 3, Willem Firth 2, Michael Long 2, Ryan Sheehan, Brian Luzzi; Albany scoring: Silas Richmond 2, Jackson Palumb, Koleton Marquis, Conner Fingar, James Ried; Shots: Cornell 40, Albany 30; Saves: Cornell - Wyatt Knust 12, Matthew Tully 1; Albany - Brady Smith 9; Attendance: 2,291 -- 5/11/2025 Ithaca, New York. (Schoellkopf Field)

| Team | 1 | 2 | 3 | 4 | OT | Total |
|---|---|---|---|---|---|---|
| Syracuse | 1 | 1 | 3 | 7 | 1 | 13 |
| Harvard (10-5) | 3 | 5 | 1 | 3 | 0 | 12 |
Syracuse scoring: Luke Rhoa 4, Trey Deere 2, Michael Leo, Sam English, Joey Spallina, Owen Hiltz, Chuck Kuczynski, Nick Caccamo, Payton Anderson; Harvard scoring: Jack Speidell 3, Logan Ip 2, Sam King 2, Teddy Malone 2, Owen Gaffney, Owen Guest, John Aurandt; Shots: Syracuse 45, Harvard 60; Saves: Syracuse - Jimmy McCool 5; Harvard - Graham Stevens 11; Attendance: 5,109 -- 5/11/2025 Syracuse, New York. (JMA Wireless Dome)

| Team | 1 | 2 | 3 | 4 | Total |
|---|---|---|---|---|---|
| Maryland | 3 | 4 | 5 | 1 | 13 |
| Air Force (9-8) | 1 | 1 | 0 | 3 | 5 |
Maryland scoring: Eric Spanos 6, Daniel Kelly 2, Zach Whittier, Bryce Ford, Matthew Keegan, Braden Erksa, Noah Armitage; Air Force scoring: Caelan Driggs 2, Josh Yago, Ryan Stadelmaier, Alexander Stepney; Shots: Maryland 39, Air Force 30; Saves: Maryland - Logan McNaney 10, Brian Ruppel 1; Air Force - Jake Marek 6; Attendance: 2,253 -- 5/11/2025 College Park, Maryland. (SECU Stadium)

| Team | 1 | 2 | 3 | 4 | Total |
|---|---|---|---|---|---|
| Ohio State (14-3) | 2 | 2 | 1 | 1 | 6 |
| Notre Dame | 1 | 6 | 4 | 4 | 15 |
Ohio State scoring: Alex Marinier 4, Garrett Haas 2; Notre Dame scoring: Jake Taylor 3, Chris Kavanagh 3, Will Angrick 2, Jordan Faison, Max Busenkell, Devon McLane, Jeffery Ricciardelli, Chris Reihnardt, Brock Behrman, Ben Ramsey; Shots: Ohio State 28, Notre Dame 43; Saves: Ohio State - Caleb Fyock 15, Henry Blake 2; Notre Dame - Thomas Ricciardelli 15; Attendance: 2,791 -- 5/11/2025 Columbus, Ohio. (OSU Lacrosse Stadium)

| Team | 1 | 2 | 3 | 4 | Total |
|---|---|---|---|---|---|
| Duke (12-6) | 1 | 6 | 1 | 4 | 12 |
| Georgetown | 3 | 4 | 5 | 4 | 16 |
Duke scoring: Max Sloat 2, Benn Johnston 2, Eric Malever 2, Liam Kershis 2, Andrew McAdorey, Graham Blake, Mac Christmas, Cal Girard; Georgetown scoring: Aidan Carroll 6, Fulton Bayman 4, Patrick Crogan 3, Jack Ransom 2, Joe Cesare; Shots: Duke 42, Georgetown 45; Saves: Duke - Patrick Jameison 13, Georgetown - Anderson Moore 9; Attendance: 1,621 -- 5/10/2025 Durham, North Carolina. (Koskinen Stadium)

| Team | 1 | 2 | 3 | 4 | Total |
|---|---|---|---|---|---|
| Penn State | 0 | 5 | 5 | 3 | 13 |
| Colgate (10-8) | 2 | 3 | 3 | 3 | 11 |
Penn State scoring: Liam Matthews 4, Matt Traynor 3, Jack Aimone 2, Ethan Long, Will Costin, Kyle Lehman, Will Peden; Colgate scoring: Jack Turner 4, Rory Conner 2, Sam Erickson 2, Casey Quinson, Liam Connor, Ben Trumble; Shots: Penn State 46, Colgate 26; Saves: Penn State - Jack Fracyon 4, Colgate - Matt Lacombe 12; Attendance: 1,807 -- 5/10/2025 State College, Pennsylvania. (Panzer Stadium)

| Team | 1 | 2 | 3 | 4 | Total |
|---|---|---|---|---|---|
| Princeton | 4 | 7 | 9 | 2 | 22 |
| Towson (11-6) | 1 | 6 | 3 | 2 | 12 |
Princeton scoring: Nate Kabiri 5, Tucker Wade 5, Colin Burns 4, Sean Cameron 3, Chad Palumbo, Peter Buonanno, Couleter Mackesy, Andrew McMeekin, Cooper Mueller; Towson scoring: Ronan Fitzpatrick 4, Mikey Weisshaar 2, Alex Vieni 2, Chop Gallagher, Chuck Matusek, Connor Slein, Michael Katz; Shots: Princeton 42, Towson 46; Saves: Princeton - Ryan Croddick 12, Colin Vickrey 3, Towson - Luke Downs 11; Attendance: 1,736 -- 5/10/2025 Princeton, New Jersey. (Class of 1952 Stadium)

| Team | 1 | 2 | 3 | 4 | Total |
|---|---|---|---|---|---|
| North Carolina (10-5) | 3 | 2 | 7 | 4 | 10 |
| Richmond | 0 | 2 | 7 | 4 | 13 |
North Carolina scoring: Owen Duffy 3, Dominic Pietramala 3, James Matan, Parker Hoffman, Ryan Levy, Matt Wrede; Richmond scoring: Lucas Littlejohn 4, Lukas Olsson 2, Max Merklinger 2, Charlie Packard 2, Gavin Creo 2, Daniel Picart; Shots: North Carolina 45, Richmond 30; Saves: North Carolina - Michael Gianforcaro 10, Richmond - Zach Vigue 12; Attendance: 1,967 -- 5/10/2025 Chapel Hill, North Carolina. (Dorrance Field)

=== Opening Round ===
| Team | 1 | 2 | 3 | 4 | Total |
|---|---|---|---|---|---|
| Albany | 6 | 1 | 2 | 2 | 11 |
| Siena (11–5) | 2 | 3 | 2 | 2 | 9 |
Albany scoring: Ryan Doherty 3, Silas Richmond 2, Jackson Palumb, Parker Emmett, Ben Wimmer, Amos Whitcomb, Alex Pfeiffer, Jacob Moran; Siena scoring: Conor Hufnagel 3, Pratt Reynolds 2, Patrick Radomski, Travis Fry, Ryan McCarthy, Jack Cavaioli; Shots: Albany 30, Siena 33; Saves: Albany - Brady Smith 11, Sienna - Andrew Arcuri 4; Attendance: 3,527 -- 5/07/2025 Albany, New York. (Bob Ford Field at Tom & Mary Casey Stadium)

| Team | 1 | 2 | 3 | 4 | Total |
|---|---|---|---|---|---|
| Robert Morris (11–6) | 2 | 2 | 3 | 2 | 9 |
| Air Force | 5 | 2 | 3 | 4 | 14 |
Robert Morris scoring: David Burr 5, Calum Brennan, Graeme Maclennan, Nolan Barker, Joel McCormick; Air Force scoring: Caelan Driggs 5, Wed Peene 3, Josh Yago 2, Luke Vrsansky, Aidan Chairs, Alexander Stepney, Cole Rassas; Shots: Robert Morris 29; Air Force 34; Saves: Robert Morris - Nate Fechter 9; Air Force - Jake Marek 6, Matt Deedy 2; Attendance: 538 -- 5/07/2025 Moon Township, Pennsylvania. (Joe Walton Stadium)

== Record by conference ==
As of 26 May 2025

| Conference | # of Bids | Record | Win % | OR | R16 | QF | SF | CG | NC |
|---|---|---|---|---|---|---|---|---|---|
| America East | 1 | 1–1 | .500 | 1 | 1 | – | – | – | – |
| ACC | 4 | 3–4 | .429 | – | 4 | 2 | 1 | – | – |
| ASUN | 1 | 1–1 | .500 | 1 | 1 | – | – | – | – |
| Atlantic 10 | 1 | 1–1 | .500 | – | 1 | 1 | – | – | – |
| Big Ten | 3 | 5–3 | .625 | – | 3 | 2 | 2 | 1 | – |
| Big East | 1 | 1–1 | .500 | – | 1 | 1 | – | – | – |
| CAA | 1 | 0–1 | .000 | – | 1 | – | – | – | – |
| Ivy League | 3 | 5–2 | .714 | – | 3 | 2 | 1 | 1 | 1 |
| MAAC | 1 | 0–1 | .000 | 1 | – | – | – | – | – |
| Northeast | 1 | 0–1 | .000 | 1 | – | – | – | – | – |
| Patriot | 1 | 0–1 | .000 | – | 1 | – | – | – | – |

== All-Tournament Team ==
CJ Kirst, A, Cornell (Most Outstanding Player)
Michael Long, A, Cornell
Wyatt Knust, GK, Cornell
Hugh Kelleher, M, Cornell
Ryan Goldstein, A, Cornell
Logan McNaney, GK, Maryland
Eric Spanos, A/M, Maryland
AJ Larkin, LSM, Maryland
Will Schaller, D, Maryland
Liam Matthews, A, Penn State

== See also ==
- NCAA Division II men's lacrosse tournament
- NCAA Division III men's lacrosse tournament
- 2025 NCAA Division I women's lacrosse tournament
