= Scott Ratliff =

American politician

Scotty Ratliff

Member of the Wyoming House of Representatives
- In office 1980–1992

Personal details
- Born: January 19, 1943 (age 83) Fort Washakie, Wyoming, US
- Party: Republican
- Spouse: Sheri
- Children: 3
- Profession: counselor

Scott J. Ratliff (born January 19, 1943) is an American politician in the state of Wyoming. An Eastern Shoshone, he is the first Native American to be elected to the Wyoming State Legislature and served as a Democrat for Fremont County, Wyoming from 1980 to 1992.

Ratliff was born in Fort Washakie, Wyoming in 1943, and attended Pavillion High School near his family's horse ranch north of Pavillion, Wyoming. He earned degrees at Arapahoe Community College, Black Hills State College (1971) and the University of Wyoming (1973). Holding a master's degree in guidance and counseling, he worked at Eastern Wyoming College and Central Wyoming College. He also served in the Vietnam War and was wounded in action.

After serving as state representative, Ratliff was a member of the Wyoming State Council on Juvenile Justice, Wyoming Cowboy Hall of Fame Board, Shoshone Economic Board, Wyoming State Board of Tribal Economics, and National Advisory Council on Indian Education. He received a human rights award from the Wyoming Counseling Association in 1990. Ratliff is married to Sheri and has three daughters. Ratliff served on Mike Enzi's staff for issues about the Wind River Indian Reservation.
