= Mac O'Keefe =

American lacrosse player

Personal information
- Nationality: American
- Born: February 6, 1998 (age 28) Plainview, New York, U.S.
- Height: 6 ft 0 in (183 cm)
- Weight: 180 lb (82 kg; 12 st 12 lb)

Sport
- Position: Attack (Field), Forward (Box)
- Shoots: Left
- NCAA team: Penn State (2021)
- NLL draft: 15th overall, 2020; San Diego Seals
- NLL team: San Diego Seals
- PLL team Former teams: Archers; Chaos
- Pro career: 2021–

Career highlights
- NCAA: Career record for goals (221); 3× All-American; 3× First Team All-Big Ten; PLL: 3× PLL Champion (2021, 2023, 2024); All-Star (2023)
Medal record
Representing United States
Men's box lacrosse
World Lacrosse Box Championships
Runner-up	2024 Utica

Macaire Emeric "Mac" O'Keefe (born February 6, 1998, in Syosset, New York) is an American professional lacrosse player who currently plays for Archers Lacrosse Club in the Premier Lacrosse League and the San Diego Seals in the National Lacrosse League. He previously played college lacrosse at Penn State, where he had set a new career goals record.

== Early life and career ==
O'Keefe was born in Plainview, New York, as one of two children to Lynann and Brian O'Keefe, and raised in Syosset, New York. Brian played college lacrosse at Fairleigh Dickinson University, where he recorded 251 career points, and professional lacrosse in the NLL for the New York Saints and Anaheim Storm. Due to his influence, Mac grew up playing box lacrosse.

In the field, O'Keefe originally played as a goalie before switching to attack in eighth grade. O'Keefe played lacrosse for Syosset High School, where he helped them to Nassau County and Long Island Class A Championships in 2015, where he led Nassau County in goals, and he earned honorable mention All-America honors in 2014 and 2015.

== Collegiate career ==
O'Keefe began his collegiate career in 2017. In his first collegiate game against Robert Morris, O'Keefe scored seven goals, earning him Big Ten Offensive Player of the Week honors. He would break Penn State's single season goals record, which had stood since 1957 with 51, earning honorable mention All-American honors, as well as being named the Big Ten Freshman of the Week six times and the Big Ten Offensive Player of the Week twice. That summer, he played for the Orangeville Northmen of the Ontario Junior Lacrosse League, where he scored 33 points in 15 games.

As a sophomore, O'Keefe saw a dip in production, though he still led the team with 35 goals and once again earned honorable mention All-American honors. He would truly break out as a junior, where he formed a dynamic partnership with teammate Grant Ament and led the NCAA with 78 goals and had the second highest scoring season in Penn State history with 96 points, behind only Ament. In the NCAA quarterfinal against Loyola, he would tie the NCAA record for most goals in a tournament game with nine, helping Penn State to their first ever final four. He would be named a second team All-American, as well as the Big Ten Tournament MVP and first team All Big Ten.

In his COVID-shortened senior season, O'Keefe would record 28 goals in seven games, recording multiple goals in each game, and was once again named a second team All-American. O'Keefe would choose to return for a fifth and final season with the Nittany Lions in 2021, where, despite having a disappointing season with Penn State failing to make the NCAA Tournament, O'Keefe once again led the team in goals with 29, and despite being an attackman, he finished third on the team in caused turnovers with seven. He broke the NCAA's all time goals record, previously held by Duke's Justin Guterding, in a 14–13 win over Michigan, a game in which O'Keefe scored six times, including the overtime winner, and at the end of the season, he was named First Team All Big Ten. He would finish his career with 221 goals, including scoring in his final 43 games, and second all time in Penn State history with 269 points. He earned a bachelor's degree in communications and pursued a second degree in labor and employment relations.

== PLL career ==
O'Keefe was selected sixth overall by Chaos in the 2021 PLL College Draft. During his first professional season, O'Keefe won the PLL Championship with Chaos.

O'Keefe signed a two-year contract with Archers in the 2023 offseason as a free agent, reuniting with Penn State teammate Grant Ament.

== NLL career ==
O'Keefe was drafted 15th overall by the San Diego Seals in the 2020 NLL Draft. He made his debut during the 2022 season with the Seals.

== Playing style ==
O'Keefe is known as being one of the best shooters in the world, using a low release point as well as having a very deceptive release, in addition to extreme power and accuracy. He has been compared to a "stretch shooter" in basketball.

== Stats ==
NCAA
Season	GP	GS	G	A	Pts	GB	CT
2017	16	16	51	5	56	21	0
2018	14	14	35	11	46	16	7
2019	18	18	78	18	96	29	8
2020	7	7	28	8	36	14	6
2021	11	11	29	6	35	19	7
Total	66	66	221	48	269	99	28

=== NLL ===
Mac O'Keefe		Regular season									Playoffs								
Season	Team	GP	G	A	Pts	LB	PIM	Pts/GP	LB/GP	PIM/GP	GP	G	A	Pts	LB	PIM	Pts/GP	LB/GP	PIM/GP
2022	San Diego Seals	15	11	15	26	40	0	1.73	2.67	0.00	1	1	0	1	3	0	1.00	3.00	0.00
2023	San Diego Seals	18	17	17	34	59	4	1.89	3.28	0.22	1	2	1	3	2	0	3.00	2.00	0.00
2024	San Diego Seals	4	4	1	5	10	2	1.25	2.50	0.50	1	0	0	0	1	0	0.00	1.00	0.00
		37	32	33	65	109	6	1.76	2.95	0.16	3	3	1	4	6	0	1.33	2.00	0.00
Career Total:		40	35	34	69	115	6	1.73	2.88	0.15									

GP–Games played; G–Goals; A–Assists; Pts–Points; LB–Loose balls; PIM–Penalty minutes; Pts/GP–Points per games played; LB/GP–Loose balls per games played; PIM/GP–Penalty minutes per games played.

=== PLL ===
Season	Team	Regular season											Playoffs										
Season	Team	GP	G	2PG	A	Pts	Sh	GB	Pen	PIM	FOW	FOA	GP	G	2PG	A	Pts	Sh	GB	Pen	PIM	FOW	FOA
2021	Chaos LC	9	9	2	2	13	29	4	0	0	0	0	3	3	0	0	3	7	0	0	0	0	0
2022	Chaos LC	10	11	2	3	16	30	5	0	0	0	0	3	3	0	0	3	16	1	0	0	0	0
2023	Archers LC	10	26	4	5	35	89	23	3	2	0	0	2	6	0	1	7	19	4	1	0.5	0	0
2024	Utah Archers	10	20	1	3	24	75	13	4	2.5	0	0	2	5	0	1	6	17	1	0	0	0	0
2025	Utah Archers	10	10	1	7	18	48	11	1	1	0	0	–	–	–	–	–	–	–	–	–	–	–
		49	76	10	20	106	271	56	8	5.5	0	0	10	17	0	2	19	59	6	1	0.5	0	0
Career total:		59	93	10	22	125	330	62	9	6	0	0											

GP–Games played; G–Goals; 2PG–2-point goals; A–Assists; Pts–Points; Sh–Shots; GB–Ground balls; Pen–Penalties; PIM–Penalty minutes; FOW–Faceoffs won; FOA–Faceoffs attempted
