= SHI Stadium =

Home stadium of the Rutgers Scarlet Knights. Piscataway, New Jersey

- The Birthplace of College Football

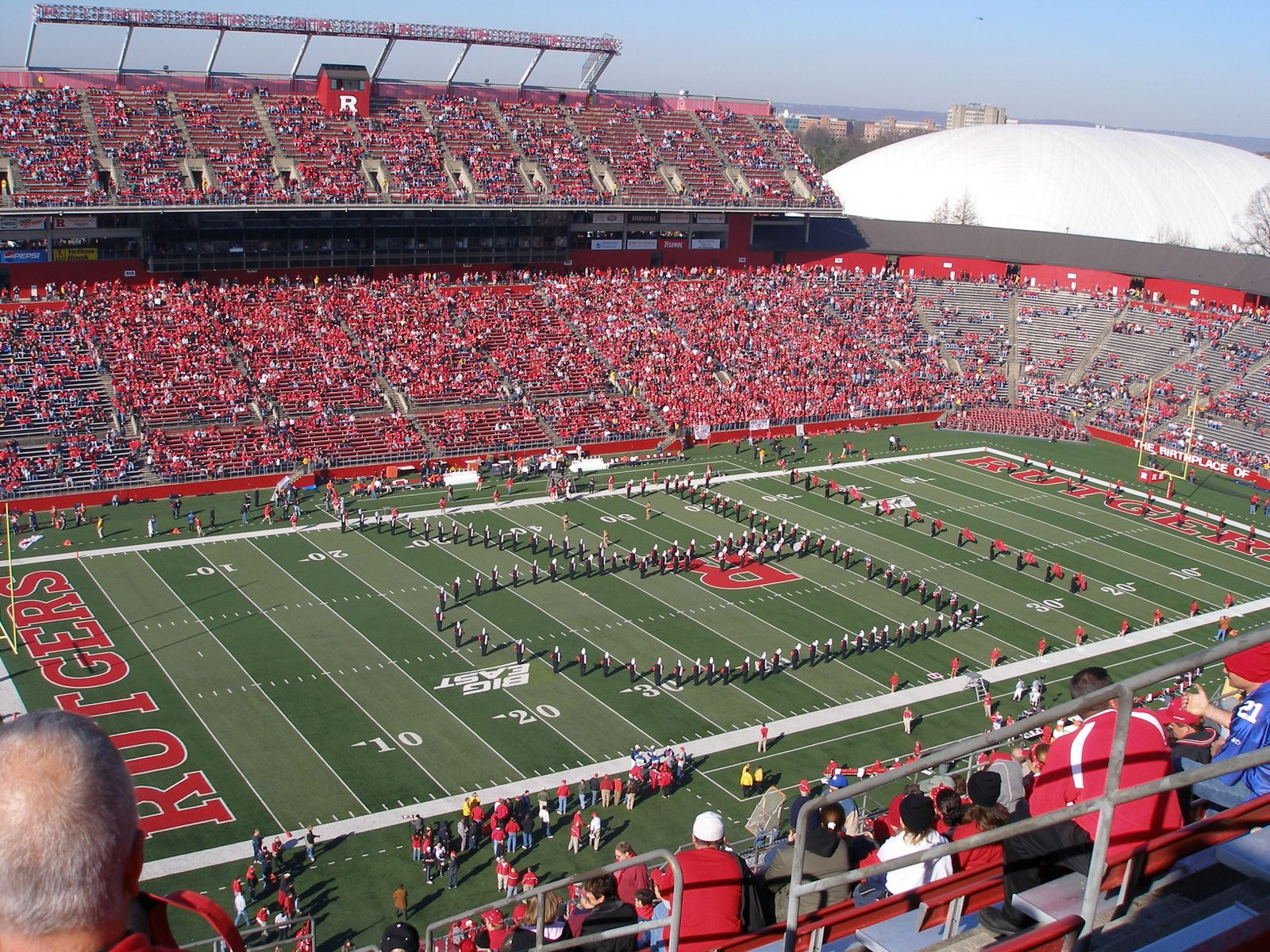
- SHI Stadium during a football game in 2006

- Location within Middlesex County, New Jersey Location within New Jersey Location within the United States
- Former names: Rutgers Stadium (1994–2011); High Point Solutions Stadium (2011–2017); HighPoint.com Stadium (2018–2019)
- Address: 1 Scarlet Knight Way
- Location: Piscataway, New Jersey
- Coordinates: 40°30′49″N 74°27′55″W
- Operator: Rutgers University
- Capacity: 52,454 (2009–present); 41,500 (1994–2009)
- Surface: FieldTurf (2004–present); Natural grass (1994–2003)

Construction
- Groundbreaking: March 9, 1993
- Opened: September 3, 1994; 32 years ago
- Cost: $28 million ($60.8 million in 2025 dollars) $102 million expansion
- Architect: GSGSBH
- General contractor: Terminal Construction Company

Tenants
- Rutgers Scarlet Knights (NCAA): Football (1994–present); Men's and women's lacrosse (2014–present)

Website
- scarletknights.com/facilities-football

SHI Stadium is the football stadium at Rutgers University in Piscataway, New Jersey. Rutgers Scarlet Knights football, Rutgers Scarlet Knights men's lacrosse, and women's lacrosse use the venue for home games. It is located on the Busch Campus at Rutgers, and overlooks the Raritan River to the South. The stadium was opened as Rutgers Stadium on September 3, 1994, when the Rutgers Scarlet Knights hosted the Kent State Golden Flashes. It currently seats 52,454 spectators after a 2009 expansion in the south end zone student section.

== Current facilities ==
SHI Stadium underwent significant reconstruction from 2008 to 2009 to increase its capacity to 52,454. The stadium features a 5,000-seat upper deck on each side of the playing field, as well as 968 loge and club seats on the mezzanine level of the East side of the stadium. A two-story press box sits on the mezzanine level of the West side of the stadium. Electronic ribbon scoreboards spanning the length of the field along the bottom of both upper decks were installed prior to the 2008 season, which complement the video scoreboard in the South end zone. Also located in the South end zone is the Brown Football Recruiting Pavilion and Welcome Center, part of the 2008–2009 expansion project.

The stadium also features light stanchions that allow for night games, a cannon for firing if Rutgers scores, concessions, and restrooms. The stadium had a grass field until 2004, when it was replaced with FieldTurf.

== History ==
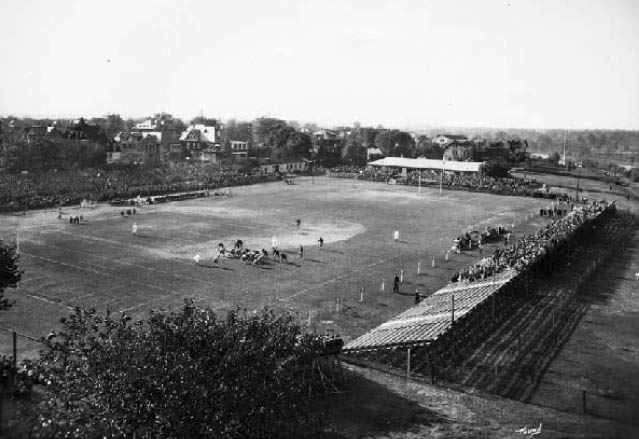
Neilson Field (pictured c. 1915) was the Rutgers stadium from 1891 to 1938

The first intercollegiate football game, in which Rutgers College beat Princeton (then the "College of New Jersey") 6–4 on November 6, 1869, was played at "College Field", which is now the location of the College Avenue Gymnasium and its parking lot. From 1891 to 1938, the Rutgers football team played at "Neilson Field" on the College Avenue Campus in New Brunswick.

With the aid of grants from the Works Progress Administration, and after three years of construction, the original Rutgers Stadium was completed in 1938. The first game in the new stadium was against Hampden-Sydney in front of an estimated crowd of about 10,000 persons. Rutgers was victorious in the contest, defeating Hampden-Sydney 32–0. The stadium was dedicated on November 5, 1938 in a game against Princeton. Rutgers won the game, 20-18. It was the first time Rutgers had defeated Princeton since the first intercollegiate football game in 1869.

On September 27, 1969, Rutgers and Princeton met for The Centennial Game at old Rutgers Stadium, which was played in front of 31,000 fans. Rutgers won 29-0, its 10th win in 60 tries against the Tigers.

The current stadium was built on the site of the original old Rutgers Stadium. During the construction of the current stadium, the Rutgers Scarlet Knights football team played the 1993 season at Giants Stadium in East Rutherford, a facility operated by the New Jersey Sports and Exposition Authority (NJSEA). The NJSEA financed the construction of the stadium via the issuance of bonds. The Scarlet Knights had previously played several games at Giants Stadium, including the first college football game hosted at that venue: a 47-0 victory over Columbia University on October 23, 1976.

The new Rutgers Stadium originally was constructed to accommodate 41,500 fans at its maximum capacity and was officially opened on September 3, 1994, in a game against Kent State University. Light stanchions were integrated into the design so night games could be played. A two-story press box that fits 200 reporters was also constructed and is still in use today. A free-standing scoreboard was built near the south end zone, which did not originally contain any seating areas. The original design of the stadium replicated the shape of a horseshoe, with the "open" end located near the south end zone.

Heralded by many newspapers, sports writers, and Rutgers fans as the "most important game in Rutgers history", on November 9, 2006, a then record crowd of 44,111 saw the Scarlet Knights upset the Louisville Cardinals at Rutgers Stadium, 28-25. The Scarlet Knights were ranked #15 and the Louisville Cardinals #3 in the nation in the Associated Press poll at the time. The game drew ESPN's third-largest TV audience for a college football game up to that point in time. The official attendance exceeded the normal maximum capacity of the stadium due to the temporary addition of bleachers in the South end zone of the stadium. The bleachers were used to seat additional students.

=== Stadium expansion (2008–2009) ===
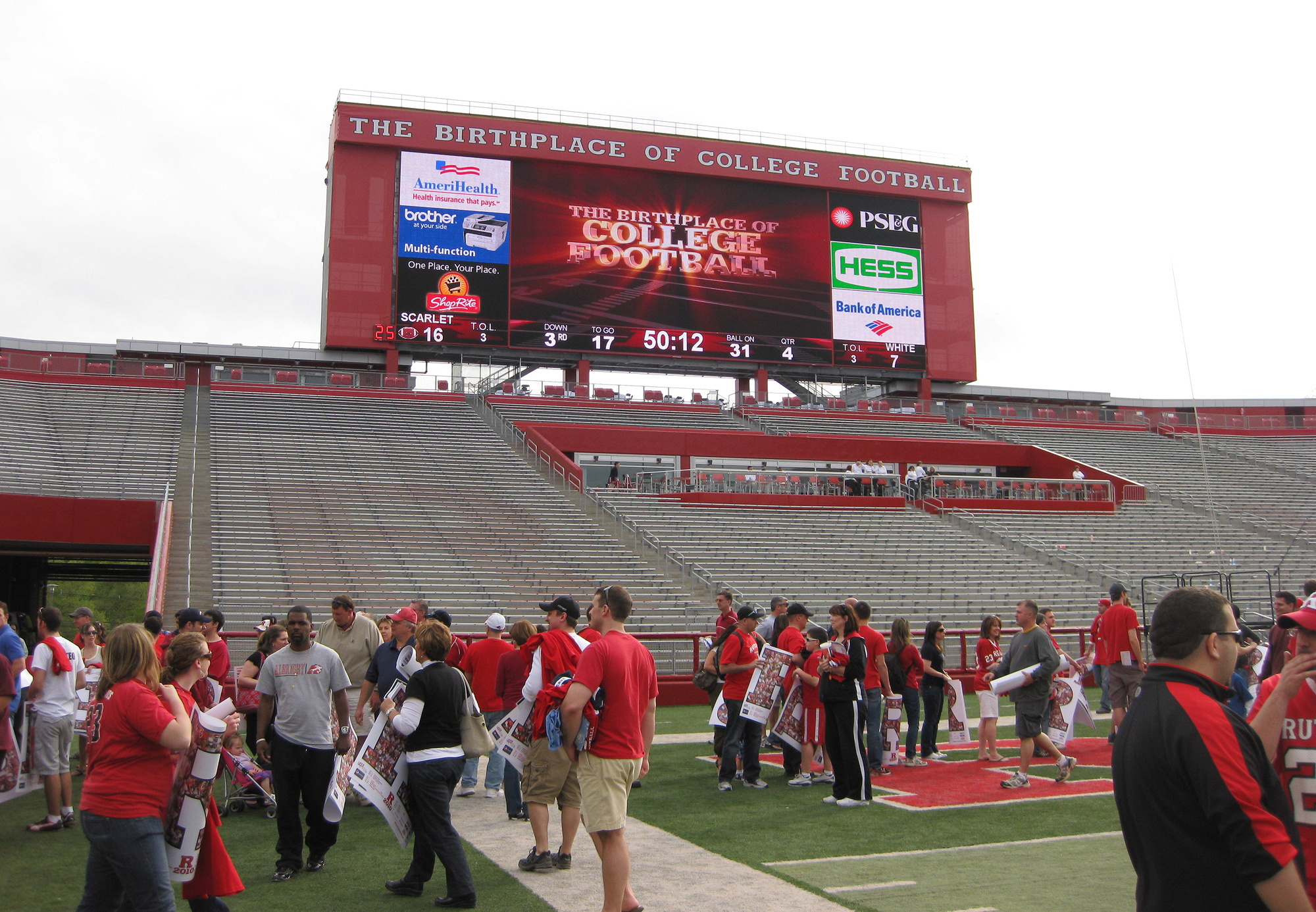
The newly expanded South End zone at Rutgers Stadium, pictured after the 2010 spring game. Note the Brown Football Recruiting Pavilion and Welcome Center located in the center of the seating area, as well as the brand new scoreboard.

In January 2008, the Board of Governors of Rutgers University announced a $102 million stadium expansion project in order to increase the stadium's seating capacity to nearly 56,000. However, the scale of the project was slightly reduced due to a poor economy and financial difficulties, resulting in a new maximum capacity of precisely 52,454.

The first phase of the project, which included the addition of 968 club seats and related infrastructure to the East mezzanine level of the stadium, was completed on time and within budget for the 2008 football season. The second phase included the addition of approximately 11,500 seats to the previously "open" South end zone, as well as supplementary restrooms and concession stands to the southern end of the stadium. The second phase of the project also involved the addition of a large scoreboard in the South end zone, which is 38' tall by 112' wide, for a total surface area of 4,256 sq ft. The old scoreboard (since demolished) was 22' tall by 30' wide, for a total surface area of 660 sq ft (61 m^{2}). The sound system was also enhanced as a part of the second phase of the expansion.

In addition to adding seats, concession stands, and bathrooms to the south end zone, the stadium expansion project called for a new entrance off River Road. The facade of the entrance is adorned with brownstone.

==== Brown Football Recruiting Pavilion and Welcome Center ====
On July 14, 2009, the Rutgers Board of Governors unanimously approved a $5 million donation specifically appropriated for a recruiting lounge in the newly expanded end zone. The lounge had been included in the original expansion design, but was later deferred after the Board of Governors revised the expansion financing plan. The donation was provided by two Rutgers alumni. The lounge was named after one of the donors, Greg Brown, who is the President and Co-CEO of Motorola. The second donor requested anonymity. Construction on the lounge commenced in August 2009, and was completed in December of that same year.

The facility seats approximately 300 people and serves as a multi-purpose center for the university. The pavilion hosts and accommodates recruits around the year and also holds fundraising events for potential donors. The center is also used during tours for prospective students.

==== Expansion financing plan ====
The $102 million price tag of the expansion project was to originally be financed via private fundraising ($30 million) and the issuance of bonds ($72 million). The private fundraising effort, however, fell significantly short of the original goal.

This situation prompted the Board of Governors of Rutgers University to approve a new financing plan for the stadium expansion in which the entire amount of $102 million was to be borrowed. Specifically, the university issued $85 million in bonds, and borrowed the remaining $17 million by way of low-interest commercial paper. In addition, a few aspects of the stadium expansion project were scaled back, including a reduction in the number of new seats (the original plan called for 14,000 seats, but only 11,500 were actually added). Also included in the original expansion plan was the construction of new locker rooms in the South end zone. The construction of these locker rooms was deferred to a later date.

==== Naming rights ====
SHI Stadium viewed from River Road (CR 622)

For decades, Rutgers Stadium had been the name of the school's football facility. However, in June 2010, Rutgers University put up for sale the naming rights to the stadium in order to bring in much needed revenue. Rutgers hired Brooklyn Sports & Entertainment and IMG College to act as agents in making a deal, who had previously negotiated deals on the now-Brooklyn Nets' home arenas in New Jersey and New York. On June 22, 2011, it was announced that High Point Solutions, based in Sparta, had purchased the rights, and that the stadium would be known as High Point Solutions Stadium. In May 2018, High Point Solutions announced they were rebranding the company to just be HighPoint.com. As a result, the name of the stadium was changed to HighPoint.com Stadium. On July 19, 2019, Rutgers signed a new naming rights agreement with Somerset-based IT firm SHI International Corp. The stadium was then renamed SHI Stadium.

== Attendance records ==
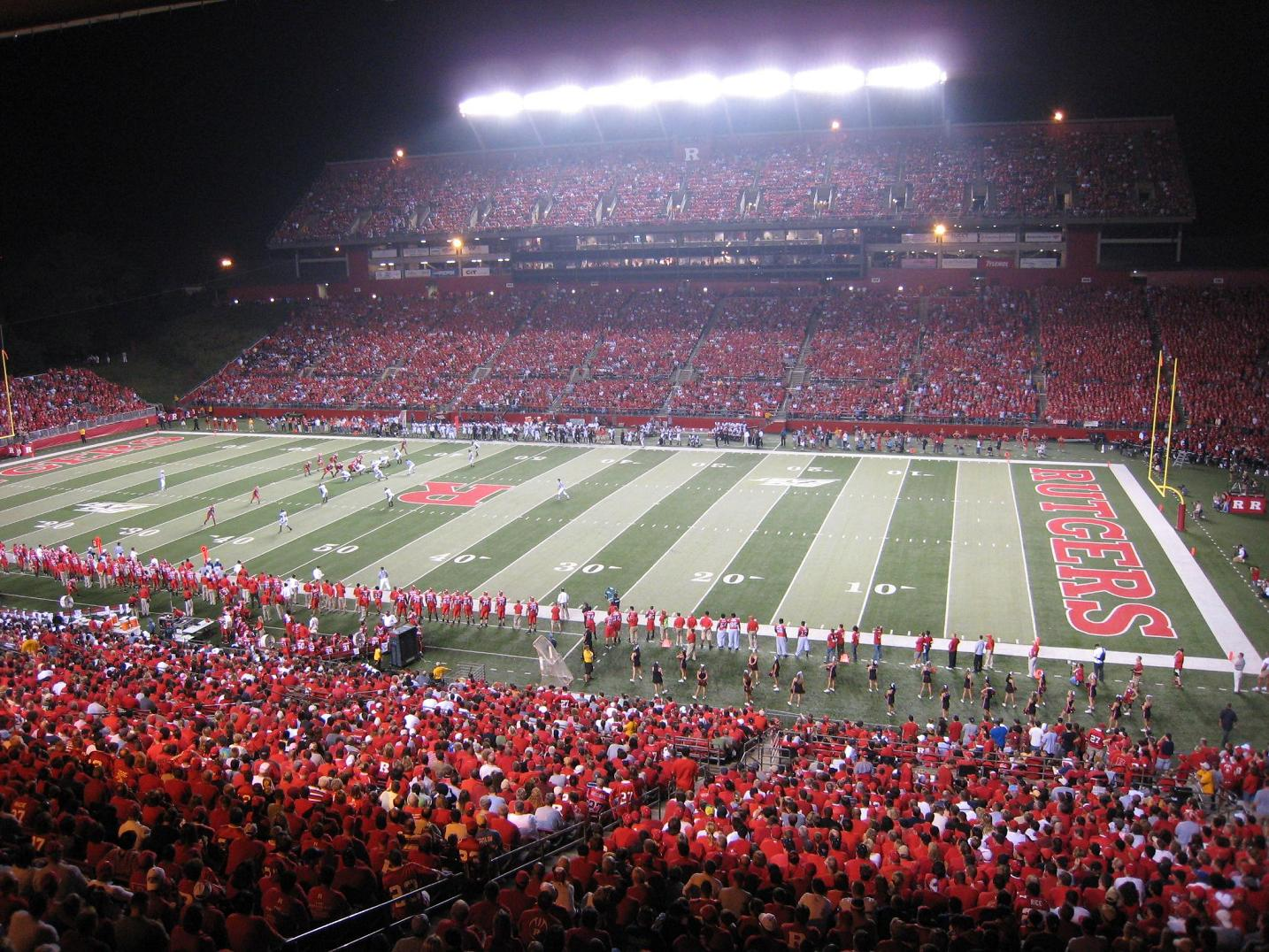
Scarlet Knights vs. Cincinnati Bearcats with 43,768 spectators in 2007

The stadium attendance records were repeatedly broken throughout the 2006 and 2007 football seasons as the football program experienced a drastic resurgence. On October 18, 2007, a record 44,267 spectators attended a game in which the Scarlet Knights played against the then #2 ranked South Florida Bulls. The Scarlet Knights would go on to win that game, and the attendance on that night would be the highest prior to the 2008–2009 stadium expansion.

The current attendance record was set in the 2025 Blackout match-up against Iowa. 55,942 spectators watched Rutgers lose 38-28 in a close affair at the hands of the Hawkeyes. The top five games in terms of attendance at Rutgers Stadium are listed below:

Rank	Attendance	Date	Game result
1	55,942 (sell-out)	Sept. 19, 2025	Iowa 38, Rutgers 28
2	55,676 (sell-out)	Nov. 19, 2022	Penn State 55, Rutgers 10
3	54,079 (sell-out)	Sept. 27, 2024	Rutgers 21, Washington 18
4	53,774 (sell-out)	Sept. 13, 2014	Penn State 13, Rutgers 10
5	53,737 (sell-out)	Sept. 7, 2009	Cincinnati 47, Rutgers 15

Rutgers men's Lacrosse hold the attendance record in SHI Stadium outside of football. They set their attendance record on April 16, 2023 with a number of 5,823 people in attendance in an 11-8 loss to Maryland.

In addition to football, SHI Stadium has been the home of Rutgers' men's and women's lacrosse teams since 2014.

The stadium has also hosted NCAA tournament soccer and lacrosse games, including the NCAA Division I Men's Lacrosse Championship games in 1998, 2001, and 2002. It is also worth noting that, prior to 1994, the original Rutgers Stadium hosted the NCAA Division I Men's Lacrosse Championship games in 1974, 1978, 1983, 1987, and 1990.

On September 25, 2005, Rutgers Stadium was the site of a lecture delivered by the Dalai Lama.

The stadium was a host venue for the 1995 U.S. Cup soccer tournament and hosted Colombia vs. Nigeria on June 17, 1995 and the United States vs. Colombia on June 25, 1995.

As of the 2019-20 school year, SHI Stadium is one of two venues that host championship games in the NJSIAA state football playoffs (MetLife Stadium is the other). The stadium hosts all South region group championship games as well as any North region games that are played in December, as well as games for parochial group champions depending on geography. SHI Stadium hosts games on Friday nights, Saturday afternoons, and Sunday afternoons during the two championship weekends.

Every year in October, Rutgers Stadium hosts USBands Marching Band New Jersey State Championships.

Since 2011, University Commencement has been held in SHI Stadium each May. On May 15, 2016, President Barack Obama addressed the class of 2016 and received an honorary degree of laws. Over 50,000 guests and graduates attended this historic day to celebrate the 250th Anniversary Commencement.

== See also ==
- List of NCAA Division I FBS football stadiums

Preceded by Bill Armstrong Stadium	Host of the College Cup; 1989	Succeeded by USF Soccer Stadium
