= 2017 NCAA Division I men's lacrosse tournament =

Men's lacrosse championship

- Teams: 17
- Finals site: Gillette Stadium, Foxborough, MA
- Champions: Maryland (3rd title)
- Runner-up: Ohio State (1st title game)
- Semifinalists: Towson (3rd Final Four); Denver (5th Final Four)
- Winning coach: John Tillman (1st title)
- MOP: Tim Muller, Maryland
- Attendance: 30,530 semi-finals 28,971 finals 59,501 total

The 2017 NCAA Division I Men's Lacrosse Championship was played on Memorial Day weekend in May 2017 at Gillette Stadium in Foxborough, Massachusetts.

This was the 47th annual single-elimination tournament to determine the national championship for National Collegiate Athletic Association (NCAA) Division I men's college lacrosse.

Seventeen teams competed in the tournament, based upon their performance during the regular season. For nine teams entry into the tournament was by means of a conference tournament automatic qualifier, eight teams received at-large selections.

Maryland won their 3rd NCAA title, defeating Ohio State 9–6. This was Maryland's first national title since 1975.

Matt Rambo led the Terps to their long delayed next national title, in the Terps third straight championship game.

== Teams ==
Seed	School	Conference	Berth Type	RPI	Record
1	Maryland	Big Ten	Automatic	1	12–3
2	Syracuse	ACC	At-large	2	12–2
3	Ohio State	Big Ten	At-large	6	13–4
4	Notre Dame	ACC	At-large	4	8–5
5	Denver	Big East	At-large	8	11–3
6	Johns Hopkins	Big Ten	At-large	7	8–6
7	Penn State	Big Ten	At-large	5	12–3
8	Albany	America East	Automatic	3	14–2
	Duke	ACC	At-large	9	12–4
	North Carolina	ACC	At-large	10	8–7
	Towson	CAA	Automatic	11	10–4
	Yale	Ivy	Automatic	13	10–5
	Loyola	Patriot	Automatic	17	10–5
	Marquette	Big East	Automatic	21	8–7
	Air Force	Southern	Automatic	24	12–5
	Bryant	Northeast	Automatic	35	10–7
	Monmouth	MAAC	Automatic	38	14–3

== Bracket ==
Play In; May 10th
Bryant	10
Monmouth	7

First Round

Campus sites: seeded teams host May 13–14

Quarterfinals
May 20–21

James M. Shuart Stadium
Delaware Stadium

Semifinals
May 27

Gillette Stadium

Championship
May 29

Gillette Stadium

1
Maryland
13

Bryant
10

1
Maryland
18

8
Albany
9

8
Albany
15

North Carolina
12

1
Maryland
9

5
Denver
8

5
Denver
17

Air Force
10

5
Denver
16

4
Notre Dame
4

4
Notre Dame
15

Marquette
9

1
Maryland
9

3
Ohio State
6

3
Ohio State
7

Loyola
4

3
Ohio State
16

Duke
11

6
Johns Hopkins
6

Duke
19

3
Ohio State
11

Towson
10

7
Penn State
8

Towson
12

Towson
10

2
Syracuse
7

2
Syracuse
11

Yale
10

== Tournament boxscores ==
Tournament Finals

Team	1	2	3	4	Total
Maryland	3	2	1	3	9
Ohio State	2	0	1	3	6
Maryland scoring – Tim Rotanz 3, Dylan Maltz 2, Adam DiMillo 2, Matt Rambo, Connor Kelly; Ohio State scoring – Tre Leclaire, Johnny Pearson, Austin Shanks, Jake Withers, Logan Maccani, Colin Chell 1; Shots: Maryland 41, Ohio State 25

Tournament Semi-Finals

Team	1	2	3	4	Total
Maryland	3	2	3	1	9
Denver	1	2	3	2	8
Maryland scoring – Connor Kelly 3, Dylan Maltz 2, Colin Heacock 2, Matt Rambo, Tim Rotanz; Denver scoring – Nate Marano 2, Ethan Walker 2, Connor Donahue, Connor Cannizzaro, Colton Jackson, Joe Reid; Shots: Maryland 32, Denver 22

Team	1	2	3	4	Total
Ohio State	2	6	3	3	11
Towson	2	5	2	1	10
Ohio State scoring – Tre Leclaire 3, Eric Fannell 2, Austin Shanks 2, Johnny Pearson, JT Blubaugh, Jack Jasinski, Logan Maccani; Towson scoring – Ryan Drenner 3, Joe Seider 3, Jon Mazza, Mike Lynch, Tyler Young, Brian Bolewicki; Shots: Towson 40, Ohio State 35; Saves: Ohio State 10, Towson 6

Tournament Quarterfinals

Team	1	2	3	4	Total
Maryland	6	6	5	1	18
Albany	2	2	1	4	9
Maryland scoring – Connor Kelly 5, Matt Rambo 4, Tim Rotanz 2, Dylan Maltz 2, Jared Bernhardt, Ben Chisolm, Colin Heacock, Tim Muller, Bryce Young; Albany scoring – Connor Fields 3, Adam Osika 2, Sean Eccles, John Glance, Jack Burgmaster, Troy Reh; Shots: Maryland 41, Albany 29

Team	1	2	3	4	Total
Ohio State	2	7	4	3	16
Duke	1	3	1	6	11
Ohio State scoring – Eric Fannell 5, Jack Jasinski 2, Johnny Pearson 2, JT Blubaugh 2, Lukas Buckley 2, Tre Leclaire, Freddy Freibott, Austin Shanks; Duke scoring – Jack Bruckner 3, Justin Guterding 2, Sean Cerrone, Brad Smith, Mitch Russell, Sean Lowrie, Joey Manown, John Prendergast; Shots: Duke 45, Ohio State 31

Team	1	2	3	4	Total
Denver	2	6	5	3	16
Notre Dame	1	0	1	2	4
Denver scoring – Austin French 4, Tyler Pace 3, Ethan Walker 3, Connor Cannizzaro 2, Trevor Baptiste, Colton Jackson, Colin Rutan, Nate Marano; Notre Dame scoring – Mikey Wynne 3, Sergio Perkovic; Shots: Denver 39, Notre Dame 16

Team	1	2	3	4	Total
Towson	6	2	1	1	10
Syracuse	0	2	1	4	7
Towson scoring – Joe Seider 4, Mike Lynch 2, Matt Wylly 2, Tyler Konen, Jon Mazza; Syracuse scoring – Nate Solomon 4, Ryan Simmons, Brendan Bomberry, Sergio Salcido; Shots: Towson 40, Syracuse 31; Shots: Towson 12, Syracuse 12

Tournament First Round

Team	1	2	3	4	Total
Maryland	4	2	5	2	13
Bryant	2	2	1	5	10
Maryland scoring – Tim Rotanz 5, Matt Rambo 2, Colin Heacock 2, Dylan Maltz, Jared Bernhardt, Matt Neufeldt, Adam DiMillo; Bryant scoring – Tucker James 4, Cam Ziegler 3, Tom Forsberg, Brett Baker, Ryan Sharpe; Shots: Bryant 35, Maryland 28

Team	1	2	3	4	Total
Ohio State	2	1	3	1	7
Loyola	0	2	2	0	4
Ohio State scoring – Tre Leclaire 3, Eric Fannell, Jack Jasinski, Colin Chell, Austin Shanks; Loyola scoring – Romar Dennis, Pat Spencer, Zack Sirico, Jared Mintzlaff; Shots: Loyola 44, Ohio State 22

Team	1	2	3	4	Total
Denver	3	3	7	4	17
Air Force	2	1	4	3	10
Denver scoring – Austin French 3, Max Planning 3, Connor Cannizzaro 3, Trevor Baptiste 2, Connor Donahue 2, Ethan Walker 2, Colton Jackson, Jeremy Bosher; Air Force scoring – Grant Gould 3, Matthew Schwartz 2, Chet Dunstan 2, Austin Smith, Trent Harper, Cameron Carter; Shots: Denver 43, Air Force 35

Team	1	2	3	4	Total
Duke	4	6	3	3	16
High Point	1	4	2	3	10
Duke scoring – Michael Sowers 4, Sean Lowrie 3, Owen Caputo 2, Brennan O'Neill 2, Garrett Leadmon, Nakeie Montgomery, JPBasile, Dyson Williams, Jake Naso; High Point scoring – Jack Vanoverbeke 2, Brayden Mayea 2, Kevin Rogers 2, Koby Russell, Asher Nolting, Tyler Stinson, Colin Clothier; Shots: Duke 43, High Point 34

Team	1	2	3	4	Total
Towson	1	2	4	5	12
Penn State	1	3	1	3	8
Towson scoring – Joe Seider 4, Ryan Drenner 2, Mike Lynch 2, Tyler Konen, Tyler Young, Alex Woodall, Dylan Kinnear; Penn State scoring – Grant Ament 3, Mac O'Keefe 3, Nick Aponte 2; Shots: Towson 43, Penn State 23; Saves: Penn State 16, Towson 9

Team	1	2	3	4	Total
Syracuse	3	1	5	2	11
Yale	3	3	2	2	10
Syracuse scoring – Jamie Trimboli 2, Nick Mariano 2, Brad Voigt, Nate Solomon, Ryan Simmons, Jordan Evans, Stephen Rehfuss, Brendan Bomberry, Sergio Salcido; Yale scoring – Ben Reeves 4, Lucas Cotler 2, Matt Gaudet 2, Joseph Sessa, Jackson Morrill; Shots: Yale 42, Syracuse 29

Team	1	2	3	4	Total
Albany	7	7	0	1	15
North Carolina	2	1	6	3	12
Albany scoring – Bennett Drake 5, Adam Osika 3, Kyle McClancy 3, Connor Fields, Sean Eccles, Mitch Laffin, Eli Lasda; North Carolina scoring – Chris Cloutier 5, Luke Goldstock 2, Jack Rowlett 2, Timmy Kelly, Justin Anderson, William McBride; Shots: Albany 46, North Carolina 43

Team	1	2	3	4	Total
Notre Dame	3	4	5	3	15
Marquette	1	3	3	2	9
Notre Dame scoring – Brendan Gleason 5, Brendan Collins 4, Mikey Wynne 2, Ryder Garnsey, Bryan Costabile, Brian Willetts, Timmy Phillips; Marquette scoring – John Wagner 3, Ryan McNamara 2, Andy Demichiei 2, Tanner Thomson, Joseph Dunn; Shots: Notre Dame 35, Marquette 35

== All-Tournament Team ==
- Tim Muller, Maryland (Most Outstanding Player)
- Tom Carey, Ohio State
- Ryan Drenner, Towson
- Connor Kelly, Maryland
- Tre Leclaire, Ohio State
- Dylan Maltz, Maryland
- Dan Morris, Maryland
- Matt Rambo, Maryland
- Tim Rotanz, Maryland
- Ethan Walker, Denver
