= Penn State Nittany Lions men's lacrosse =

Men's lacrosse team of Penn State University

- Founded: 1921; 105 years ago
- University: Pennsylvania State University
- Head coach: Jeff Tambroni (since 2011 season)
- Stadium: Panzer Stadium (capacity: 1,300)
- Location: State College, Pennsylvania
- Conference: Big Ten Conference
- Nickname: Nittany Lions
- Colors: Blue and white

NCAA Tournament Final Fours
- 2019, 2023, 2025

NCAA Tournament Quarterfinals
- 2019, 2023, 2025, 2026

NCAA Tournament appearances
- 2003, 2005, 2013, 2017, 2019, 2023, 2024, 2025, 2026

Conference Tournament championships
- 2019, 2026

Conference regular season championships
- 2005, 2013, 2019, 2023, 2026

The Penn State Nittany Lions men's lacrosse team represents Pennsylvania State University in National Collegiate Athletic Association (NCAA) Division I college lacrosse. The Nittany Lions are led by head coach Jeff Tambroni.

== History ==
Penn State was an independent varsity lacrosse program from 1913 through 1999 until it joined the Eastern College Athletic Conference (ECAC) from 2000-2009. Penn State was a member of the Colonial Athletic Association (CAA) Conference from 2010 -2014. Penn State joined the newly formed lacrosse Big Ten Conference (B1G) starting in 2015.

The current head coach is Jeff Tambroni since 2011, who was hired after a successful ten-year run as head coach at Cornell, including making it to two championship weekends with a close loss in the 2009 NCAA finals. He is among the winningest Division I lacrosse coaches with 200 career wins, was 2009 USILA Division I Coach of the Year, and three-time conference Coach of the Year with Penn State. He played collegiate lacrosse at Hobart, where he ranks among the school's all-time greats after he earned three All-America awards and three national championships resulting in induction into their Hall of Fame.

Penn State has made seven appearances in the NCAA Division I Men's Lacrosse Championship Tournament with a record of 4-7. The first appearance coming in 2003 resulted in a first-round loss to Towson 11-6. In 2005, they lost to Maryland in the first round 14-10. The Nittany Lions made the tournament in 2013 as the #8 seed, the first time they achieved a seeding in the NCAAs, losing to Yale 13–10. Penn State appeared in 2017 as the #7 seed but was eliminated in the first round by Towson 10-8. 2019 was their best season, the Nittany Lions were Big Ten Conference season and tournament champions for the first time and entered the 2019 tournament as the #1 seed. They had victories over UMBC 25-10 and Loyola 21-14 to advance to Championship weekend before their season came to an end with a 21-17 loss to Yale in the semifinals.

They have had 140 All-Americans and 12 Scholar All-Americans. There are two Nittany Lions in the National Lacrosse Hall of Fame, Glenn "Nick" Thiel, who was instrumental in making lacrosse at Penn State a viable sport, and Tom Hayes, an All-American player and later long time coach at Drexel and Rutgers. National Football League wide receiver Chris Hogan was a standout lacrosse player for Penn State from 2008 to 2010. Drew Adams '09, Hogan '10, Austin Kaut '13, Chris Sabia '19, Grant Ament '20, Gerard Arceri '21, and Mac O'Keefe '21 are Penn State lacrosse alumni playing professional lacrosse in the Premier Lacrosse League. In 2013, Kaut was named the first Penn State NCAA Division I goaltender of the year. Ament had a record-breaking year in 2019 when he was the first Nittany Lion awarded the NCAA Division I Outstanding Attackman of the Year, voted Big Ten Offensive Player of the Year, and became the record holder for most assists (96) and assists per game (5.65) for a season, and most points (tied 25) and assists (18) in the Championship Tournament. He also holds the records for most points (126) in a Big Ten season, and career points and assists in the Big Ten (284 and 191). O'Keefe is among the leaders in most career goals (221) in the history of Division I NCAA lacrosse, most goals in a Big Ten season (78 in 2019), and most goals in a Championship Tournament game (tied 9 vs Loyola in 2019)

Penn State has played Rutgers more than any other school and is 22-46 against them as of 2021. Since 1998, Penn State and Rutgers have played annually for the Friendship Cup. Penn State has won the Friendship cup 13 times and Rutgers has won it 8 times as of 2021.

When Michigan began Division I lacrosse play in 2012, the only Big Ten schools at the time (Penn State, Michigan and Ohio State) began playing annually for the Creator’s Trophy. The tradition continues today among the three original members. Penn State claimed the Creator's Trophy in 2012, 2014, 2016, 2017, 2018 (3 way tie), 2019, 2021, 2023, and 2024. (2020 - no Creator's Trophy games due to Covid).

== Season Results ==
The following is a list of Penn State's results by season as an NCAA Division I program:

Season	Coach	Overall	Conference	Standing	Postseason
Dick Pencek (Independent) (1962, 1965–1977)
1971	Dick Pencek	4–6			
1972	Dick Pencek	4–6			
1973	Dick Pencek	5–6			USILA
1974	Dick Pencek	6–5			
1975	Dick Pencek	9–2			
1976	Dick Pencek	7–2			
1977	Dick Pencek	4–6			
Dick Pencek:		70–68–2 (.507)			
Glenn Thiel (Independent) (1978–1999)
1978	Glenn Thiel	3–7			
1979	Glenn Thiel	2–9			
1980	Glenn Thiel	6–5			
1981	Glenn Thiel	9–2			
1982	Glenn Thiel	8–3			
1983	Glenn Thiel	4–7			
1984	Glenn Thiel	6–7			
1985	Glenn Thiel	3–10			
1986	Glenn Thiel	7–6			
1987	Glenn Thiel	10–5			
1988	Glenn Thiel	8–6			
1989	Glenn Thiel	10–5			
1990	Glenn Thiel	10–5			
1991	Glenn Thiel	9–4			
1992	Glenn Thiel	9–3			
1993	Glenn Thiel	6–5			
1994	Glenn Thiel	8–4			
1995	Glenn Thiel	11–2			
1996	Glenn Thiel	10–3			
1997	Glenn Thiel	8–4			
1998	Glenn Thiel	6–6			
1999	Glenn Thiel	8–4			
Glenn Thiel (ECAC Lacrosse League) (2000–2011)
2000	Glenn Thiel	7–7	3–3		
2001	Glenn Thiel	7–6	2–4		
2002	Glenn Thiel	8–5	1–4		
2003	Glenn Thiel	7–7	3–2		NCAA Division I First Round
2004	Glenn Thiel	6–7	0–3		
2005	Glenn Thiel	9–6	5–1	T–1st	NCAA Division I First Round
2006	Glenn Thiel	8–5	5–2	T-2nd	
2007	Glenn Thiel	5–8	3–4	5th	
2008	Glenn Thiel	7–7	2–5	6th	
2009	Glenn Thiel	9–5	4–3	3rd	
Glenn Thiel (Colonial Athletic Association) (2010–2011)
2010	Glenn Thiel	2–11	1–4	6th	
Glenn Thiel:		236–186 (.559)	29–35 (.453)		
Jeff Tambroni (Colonial Athletic Association) (2011–2014)
2011	Jeff Tambroni	8–6	4–2	T–2nd	
2012	Jeff Tambroni	9–6	5–1	2nd	
2013	Jeff Tambroni	12–5	6–0	1st	NCAA Division I First Round
2014	Jeff Tambroni	7–6	3–2	3rd	
Jeff Tambroni (Big Ten Conference) (2015–Present)
2015	Jeff Tambroni	5–9	2–3	4th	
2016	Jeff Tambroni	8–7	2–3	T–4th	
2017	Jeff Tambroni	12–4	3–2	T–2nd	NCAA Division I First Round
2018	Jeff Tambroni	8–6	2–3	T–4th	
2019	Jeff Tambroni	16–2	5–0	1st	NCAA Division I Final Four
2020	Jeff Tambroni	5–2	0–0	†	†
2021	Jeff Tambroni	4–7	4–6	T–3rd	
2022	Jeff Tambroni	3–11	1–4	5th	
2023	Jeff Tambroni	11–5	4–1	T–1st	NCAA Division I Final Four
2024	Jeff Tambroni	11–5	3–2	T–2nd	NCAA Division I First Round
2025	Jeff Tambroni	12–5	3–2	T–2nd	NCAA Division I Final Four
2026	Jeff Tambroni	10–6	3–2	T–1st	NCAA Division I Quarterfinals
Jeff Tambroni:		141–92 (.605)	50–33 (.602)		
Total:		596–562–8 (.515)			
National champion Postseason invitational champion Conference regular season champion Conference regular season and conference tournament champion Division regular season champion Division regular season and conference tournament champion Conference tournament champion

† NCAA canceled 2020 collegiate activities due to the COVID-19 virus.

== Alumni in the Premier Lacrosse League (4) ==
Year Drafted	Name	Position	Height	Weight	Drafted By	Draft Pick	Current Team	All Star	Accolades
2014	Austin Kaut	Goalie	6'1	197	Boston Cannons (MLL)	3rd round (19th overall)	Chaos LC	None	None
2019	Chris Sabia	Defense	6'2	200	Chrome LC	2nd round (10th overall)	Waterdogs LC	None	None
2020	Grant Ament	Attack	5'9	165	Archers LC	1st round (1st overall)	Archers LC	1x All Star ('21)	1x McEneaney ('21)
2021	Mac O'Keefe	Attack	6'0	180	Chaos LC	1st round (6th overall)	Chaos LC	None	None

== See also ==
- Drew Adams
- Chris Garrity
- Pat Heim
- Chris Hogan
- Lacrosse in Pennsylvania
- NCAA men's lacrosse championship
- United States Intercollegiate Lacrosse Association
