= Ohio State Buckeyes men's lacrosse =

- Founded: 1953
- University: Ohio State University
- Head coach: Nick Myers (since 2009 season)
- Stadium: OSU Lacrosse Stadium (capacity: 1,800)
- Location: Columbus, Ohio
- Conference: Big Ten Conference
- Nickname: Buckeyes
- Colors: Scarlet and gray

NCAA Tournament Runner-Up
- (1) - 2017

NCAA Tournament Final Fours
- (1) - 2017

NCAA Tournament Quarterfinals
- (4) - 2008, 2013, 2015, 2017

NCAA Tournament appearances
- (8) - 2003, 2004, 2008, 2013, 2015, 2017, 2022, 2025

Conference Tournament championships
- (2) - 2013, 2025

Conference regular season championships
- (12*) - 1965, 1966, 1978, 1986, 1988, 1992*, 1999, 2003, 2004, 2008, 2014, 2025, 2026; *Vacated

The Ohio State Buckeyes men's lacrosse team represents Ohio State University in National Collegiate Athletic Association (NCAA) Division I college lacrosse. The program was created in 1953. Ohio State plays its home games at the OSU Lacrosse Stadium, which has a capacity of 2,200. The Buckeyes have competed in the Big Ten men's lacrosse conference since 2015.

Through 2024, the team has an all–time record of 523-457-5. In 2008, Ohio State won its first NCAA men's lacrosse tournament game, defeating Cornell, 15–7, before falling to Duke, 21–10, in the quarterfinals. In 2013, they recorded their second tournament win, defeating Towson, 16–6. In 2017, they made their first Final Four appearance in school history. They beat Towson in the semifinals, but lost in the championship to Maryland, 9-6.

== Season results ==
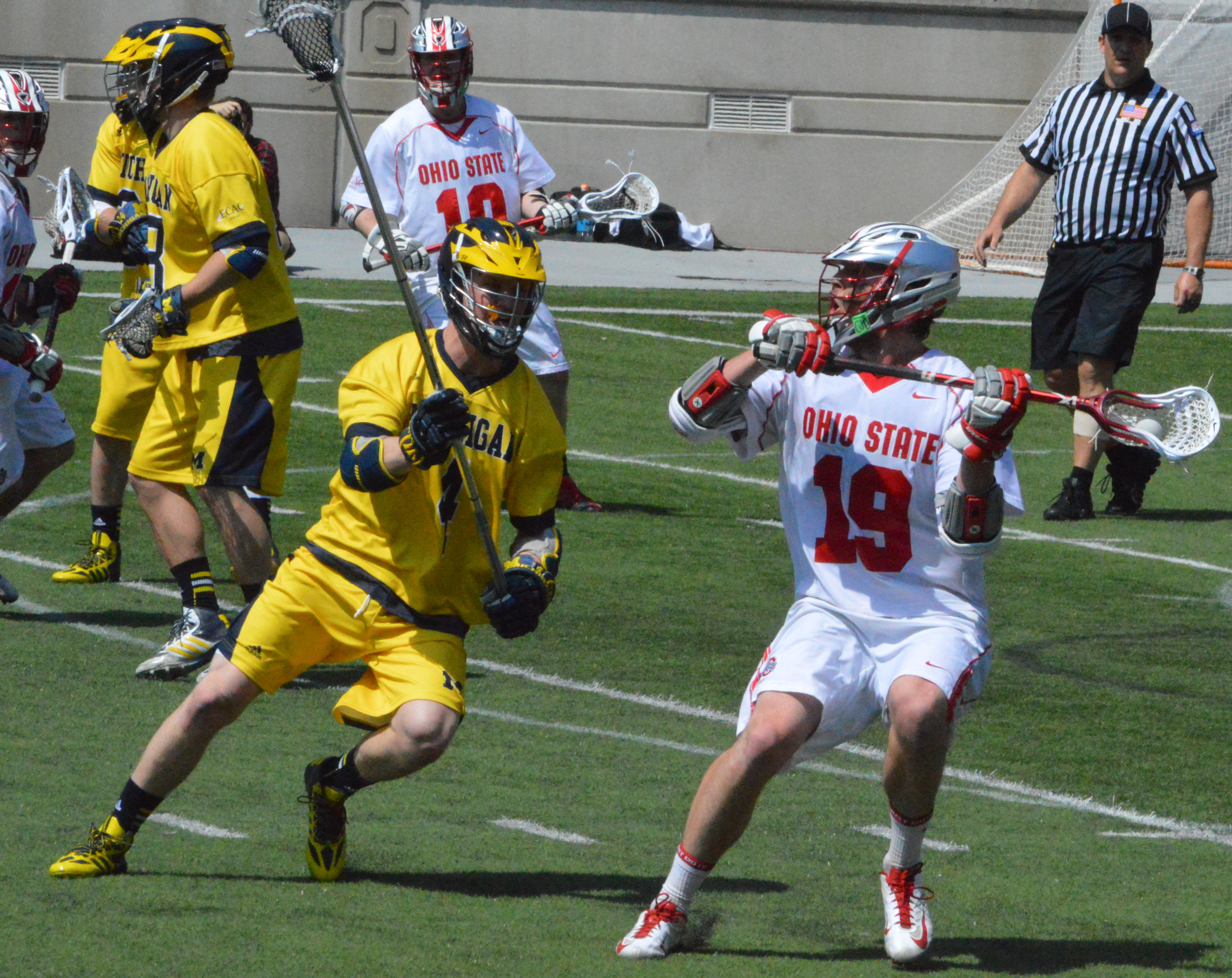
A 2014 lacrosse game between Ohio State and Michigan at Ohio Stadium

The following is a list of Ohio State's season results as an NCAA Division I program:

Season	Coach	Overall	Conference	Standing	Postseason
Conrad Steele (Midwest Lacrosse Association) (1967–1973)
1971	Conrad Steele	7–4	5–3		
1972	Conrad Steele	5–9	2–5	6th	
1973	Conrad Steele	3–9	1–8		
Conrad Steele:		41–37 (.526)	16–18 (.471)		
John Munson (Midwest Lacrosse Association) (1974–1975)
1974	John Munson	11–5	6–3	4th	
1975	John Munson	7–7	2–6	7th	
John Munson:		18–12 (.600)	8–9 (.471)		
Jerry Bell (Midwest Lacrosse Association) (1976–1979)
1976	Jerry Bell	9–3	4–3	5th	
1977	Jerry Bell	7–7	3–4		
1978	Jerry Bell	14–1	7–0	1st	
1979	Jerry Bell	8–7	5–3		
Jerry Bell:		38–15 (.717)	19–10 (.655)		
Al Bianco (Midwest Lacrosse Association) (1980–1984)
1980	Al Bianco	7–7	4–4	1st	
1981	Al Bianco	8–6	7–4	1st	
1982	Al Bianco	5–10	4–6		
1983	Al Bianco	7–6	6–4		
1984	Al Bianco	7–6	0–0		
Al Bianco:		34–35 (.493)	21–18 (.538)		
Fred Koval (Midwest Lacrosse Association) (1985–1989)
1985	Fred Koval	7–7	3–3		
1986	Fred Koval	7–7	4–1	T–1st	
1987	Fred Koval	7–7	2–2		
1988	Fred Koval	12–4	3–1	T–1st	
1989	Fred Koval	5–9	2–1	2nd	
Fred Koval:		38–34 (.528)	14–8 (.636)		
Brion Salazar (Midwest Lacrosse Association) (1990–1993)
1990	Brion Salazar	4–10	0–2		
1991	Brion Salazar	8–8	0–0		
1992*	Brion Salazar	2–12*	0–7*	8th*	
1993	Brion Salazar	8–6	1–3	4th	
Brion Salazar:		22–36* (.379)	1–12* (.077)		
Paul Caldwell (Great Western Lacrosse League) (1994–1997)
1994	Paul Caldwell	4–7	0–4	5th	
1995	Paul Caldwell	5–9	0–4	5th	
1996	Paul Caldwell	5–8	1–3		
1997	Paul Caldwell	6–6	0–3	4th	
Paul Caldwell:		20–30 (.400)	1–14 (.067)		
Joe Breschi (Great Western Lacrosse League) (1998–2008)
1998	Joe Breschi	5–7	2–2	3rd	
1999	Joe Breschi	10–3	3–1	T–1st	
2000	Joe Breschi	6–8	2–2	T–2nd	
2001	Joe Breschi	8–6	2–3	T–4th	
2002	Joe Breschi	9–5	3–2	3rd	
2003	Joe Breschi	9–5	4–1	T–1st	NCAA Division I First Round
2004	Joe Breschi	12–4	5–0	1st	NCAA Division I First Round
2005	Joe Breschi	6–8	2–3	4th	
2006	Joe Breschi	7–6	3–2	T–2nd	
2007	Joe Breschi	9–5	4–1	2nd	
2008	Joe Breschi	11–6	4–1	T–1st	NCAA Division I Quarterfinals
Joe Breschi:		92–63 (.594)	34–18 (.654)		
Nick Myers (Great Western Lacrosse League) (2009–2010)
2009	Nick Myers	8–8	3–2	3rd	
Nick Myers (ECAC Lacrosse League) (2010–2014)
2010	Nick Myers	7–8	3–4	T–5th	
2011	Nick Myers	8–8	3–3	T–3rd	
2012	Nick Myers	8–7	5–1	T–2nd	
2013	Nick Myers	13–4	5–2	3rd	NCAA Division I Quarterfinals
2014	Nick Myers	6–8	3–1	T–1st	
Nick Myers (Big Ten Conference) (2015–Present)
2015	Nick Myers	12–7	3–2	3rd	NCAA Division I Quarterfinals
2016	Nick Myers	7–8	2–3	T–4th	
2017	Nick Myers	16–5	3–2	T–2nd	NCAA Division I Runner–Up
2018	Nick Myers	8–7	3–2	T–2nd	
2019	Nick Myers	8–4	1–4	T–5th	
2020	Nick Myers	5–2	0–0	†	†
2021	Nick Myers	4–7	4–6	T–3rd	
2022	Nick Myers	10–6	3–2	3rd	NCAA Division I First Round
2023	Nick Myers	5–9	1–4	T–5th	
2024	Nick Myers	6–9	1–4	T–5th	
2025	Nick Myers	14–3	4–1	1st	NCAA Division I First Round
2026	Nick Myers	10–4	3–2	T–1st	
Nick Myers:		155–114 (.576)	50–45 (.526)		
Total:		547–464–5* (.541)			
National champion Postseason invitational champion Conference regular season champion Conference regular season and conference tournament champion Division regular season champion Division regular season and conference tournament champion Conference tournament champion

†NCAA canceled 2020 collegiate activities due to the COVID-19 virus.

- Ohio State forfeited eight games in 1992 per NCAA sanctions. Their record prior to sanctions was 10–4 (5–2) and T–1st MLA. The pre–sanction coaching record for Brion Salazar is 30–28 (6–7).

== Alumni in the Premier Lacrosse League (8) ==
Year Drafted	Name	Position	Height	Weight	Drafted By	Draft Pick	Current Team	All Star	Accolades
2013	Dominique Alexander	D Midfield	6'2	225	Ohio Machine (MLL)	5th round (33rd overall)	Archers LC	1x All Star ('21)	1x Boiardi ('19)
2017	Jake Withers	Faceoff	5'11	202	Atlanta Blaze (MLL)	1st round (9th overall)	Waterdogs LC	None	None
2018	Ben Randall	Defense	6'3	192	Charlotte Hounds (MLL)	2nd round (14th overall)	Waterdogs LC	None	None
2019	Jack Jasinski	Midfield	5'7	163	Dallas Rattlers (MLL)	4th round (35th overall)	Archers LC	None	None
2021	Ryan Terefenko	D Midfield	6'0	195	Chrome LC	2nd round (12th overall)	Chrome LC	None	None
2021	Tre LeClaire	Midfield	6'2	211	Archers LC	2nd round (13th overall)	Archers LC	None	None
2022	Justin Inacio	Faceoff	5'10	188	Archers LC	3rd round (18th overall)	Archers LC	None	None
2022	Jackson Reid	Midfield	5'10	166	Whipsnakes LC	4th round (26th overall)	Whipsnakes LC	None	None
