= Rutgers Scarlet Knights men's lacrosse =

- Founded: 1887
- University: Rutgers University
- Head coach: Brian Brecht (since 2012 season)
- Stadium: SHI Stadium (capacity: 52,454)
- Location: New Brunswick, New Jersey
- Conference: Big Ten Conference
- Nickname: Scarlet Knights
- Colors: Scarlet

Pre-NCAA era championships
- (2) – 1928, 1955*

NCAA Tournament Final Fours
- (1) – 2022

NCAA Tournament Quarterfinals
- (8) – 1972, 1974, 1975, 1984, 1986, 1990, 2021, 2022

NCAA Tournament appearances
- (11) – 1972, 1974, 1975, 1984, 1986, 1990, 1991, 2003, 2004, 2021, 2022; *Division II

The Rutgers Scarlet Knights men's lacrosse team represents Rutgers University main campus in National Collegiate Athletic Association (NCAA) Division I college lacrosse. The program first started at the varsity level in 1887. The coach is currently Brian Brecht, who is in his eighth year at that position and who joined Rutgers after previously coaching at Siena College. The team plays its home games at SHI Stadium. On July 1, 2014, Rutgers joined the Big Ten Conference in all sports.

== History ==
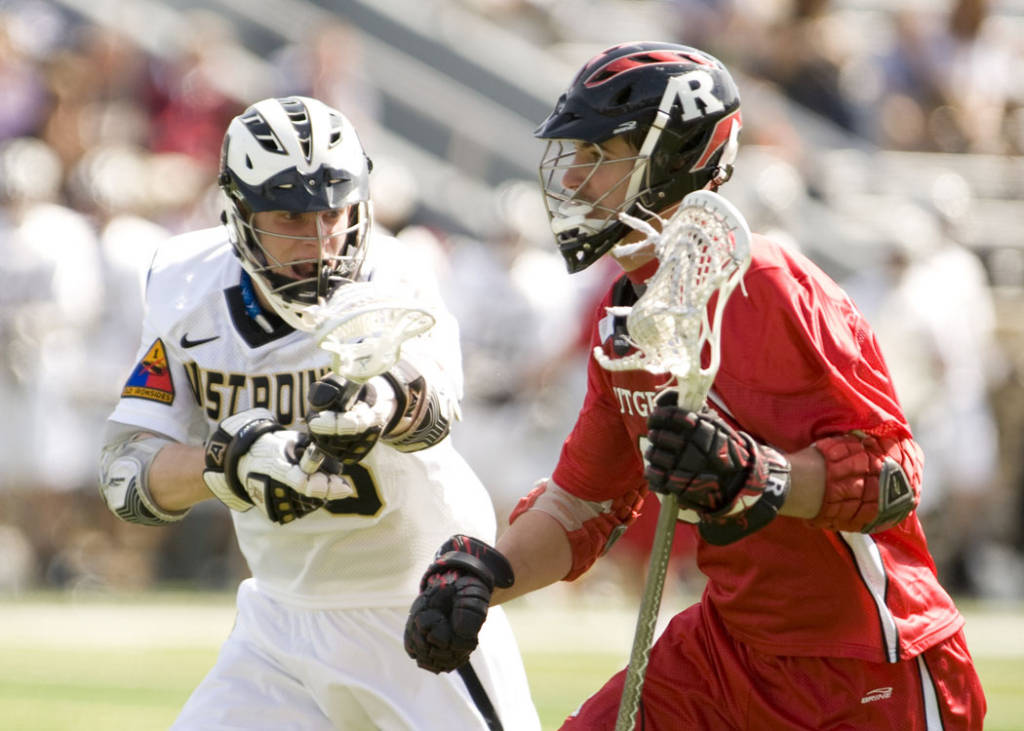
Rutgers plays Army in 2010

Rutgers began playing lacrosse in 1887. The team lasted 3 years, folding in 1889 after it 2–1 season. The program was re-instated in 1920 due in part to the efforts of Harland W. “Tots” Meistrell. In 1926 Fred Fitch took over the program and began a period of national prominence. The team joined the USILA and in 1928 was awarded one of the association's gold medals as an outstanding team, along with three other teams that also shared the championship (Johns Hopkins, Maryland, and Navy). In 1932 the Rutgers team, led by “the best attack pair in the country” George Latimer and Frenchy Julien participated in the U.S. Olympic team tryouts. During Fitch's 22 seasons the team posted a record of 106–71–8. Al Twitchell took over the reins in 1950 with the retirement of Fitch. In 1955 he guided the team to a co-national championship of the USILA's Laurie Cox (Class B) Division.

Rutgers plays Princeton for the Meistrell Cup in honor of Harland (Tots) Meistrell who in addition to re-instating the lacrosse program at Rutgers, he also restarted the dormant lacrosse program at Princeton in 1921. Rutgers also plays Penn State for the Friendship Cup which is a symbol of the friendship of four friends from Sewanhaka High School on Long Island who went off to college splitting two ways; one pair attending Penn State, and the other heading off to Rutgers.

Rutgers appeared in its first NCAA tournament in 1972. In the 1986 tournament, Rutgers defeated C.W. Post, 13–8, in the first round, before falling 5–17 to Syracuse in the quarterfinals. The Scarlet Knights most recent NCAA tournament victory came in the 2021 NCAA Division I Men's Lacrosse Championship, as they defeated Lehigh by a score of 12–5, before losing 11–12 in the quarterfinals to North Carolina. It was the Scarlet Knight's first NCAA tournament victory in 31 years. The following season, the Scarlet Knights made the Final Four for the first time with an 11-9 quarterfinal victory over Penn.

Since its inception in 1887, the Scarlet Knights have won 560 games and one national Class B championship, as well as producing 197 All-Americans and 10 lacrosse hall of famers.

== Season Results ==
The following is a list of Rutgers's results by season as an NCAA Division I program:

Season	Coach	Overall	Conference	Standing	Postseason
Bob Naso (Independent) (1962–1974)
1971	Bob Naso	6–6			
1972	Bob Naso	9–3			NCAA Division I Quarterfinals
1973	Bob Naso	9–4			
1974	Bob Naso	8–5			NCAA Division I Quarterfinals
Bob Naso:		95–60–1 (.612)			
Tom Hayes (Independent) (1975–1999)
1975	Tom Hayes	7–6			NCAA Division I Quarterfinals
1976	Tom Hayes	4–6			
1977	Tom Hayes	7–5			
1978	Tom Hayes	9–4			
1979	Tom Hayes	8–4			
1980	Tom Hayes	7–5			
1981	Tom Hayes	7–6			
1982	Tom Hayes	10–2			
1983	Tom Hayes	9–5			
1984	Tom Hayes	8–5			NCAA Division I Quarterfinals
1985	Tom Hayes	7–6			
1986	Tom Hayes	11–4			NCAA Division I Quarterfinals
1987	Tom Hayes	8–5			
1988	Tom Hayes	8–5			
1989	Tom Hayes	9–5			
1990	Tom Hayes	10–5			NCAA Division I Quarterfinals
1991	Tom Hayes	7–6			NCAA Division I First Round
1992	Tom Hayes	6–8			
1993	Tom Hayes	8–5			
1994	Tom Hayes	7–9			
1995	Tom Hayes	9–6			
1996	Tom Hayes	5–9			
1997	Tom Hayes	8–7			
1998	Tom Hayes	8–7			
1999	Tom Hayes	4–10			
Tom Hayes (ECAC Lacrosse League) (2000–2001)
2000	Tom Hayes	3–11	1–5		
Tom Hayes:		194–156 (.554)	1–5 (.167)		
Bill Dirrigl (ECAC Lacrosse League) (2001–2002)
2001	Bill Dirrigl	5–8	2–4		
Bill Dirrigl:		5–8 (.385)	2–4 (.333)		
Jim Stagnitta (ECAC Lacrosse League) (2002–2009)
2002	Jim Stagnitta	2–12	0–5	6th	
2003	Jim Stagnitta	10–5	3–2		NCAA Division I First Round
2004	Jim Stagnitta	8–6	1–2		NCAA Division I First Round
2005	Jim Stagnitta	4–9	1–5		
2006	Jim Stagnitta	5–9	2–5		
2007	Jim Stagnitta	7–6	4–3		
2008	Jim Stagnitta	6–7	4–3		
2009	Jim Stagnitta	4–11	2–5	T–6th	
Jim Stagnitta (Big East Conference) (2010–2011)
2010	Jim Stagnitta	6–8	2–4	T–4th	
2011	Jim Stagnitta	6–9	1–5	6th	
Jim Stagnitta:		58–82 (.414)	20–39 (.339)		
Brian Brecht (Big East Conference) (2012–2014)
2012	Brian Brecht	6–9	1–5	T–6th	
2013	Brian Brecht	2–13	0–6	7th	
2014	Brian Brecht	8–8	3–3	T–3rd	
Brian Brecht (Big Ten Conference) (2015–Present)
2015	Brian Brecht	5–10	1–4	T–5th	
2016	Brian Brecht	11–5	3–2	T–2nd	
2017	Brian Brecht	10–4	2–3	5th	
2018	Brian Brecht	9–6	2–3	T–4th	
2019	Brian Brecht	7–8	2–3	4th	
2020	Brian Brecht	2–4	0–0	†	†
2021	Brian Brecht	9–4	8–2	2nd	NCAA Division I Quarterfinals
2022	Brian Brecht	15–4	4–1	2nd	NCAA Division I Final Four
2023	Brian Brecht	8–6	1–4	T–5th	
2024	Brian Brecht	7–7	1–4	T–5th	
2025	Brian Brecht	7–9	2–3	5th	
2026	Brian Brecht	8–7	1–4	6th	
Brian Brecht:		114–102 (.528)	31–47 (.397)		
Total:		677–559–14 (.547)			
National champion Postseason invitational champion Conference regular season champion Conference regular season and conference tournament champion Division regular season champion Division regular season and conference tournament champion Conference tournament champion

†NCAA canceled 2020 collegiate activities due to the COVID-19 virus.

== Alumni in the Premier Lacrosse League (10) ==
Year Drafted	Name	Position	Height	Weight	Drafted By	Draft Pick	Current Team	All Star	Accolades
2015	Joe Nardella	Faceoff	5'10	210	Boston Cannons (MLL)	5th round (36th overall)	Whipsnakes LC	2x All Star ('20,'21)	1x Cantabene ('20)
2018	Jules Heningburg	Attack	6'2	205	Florida Launch (MLL)	1st round (7th overall)	Redwoods LC	2x All Star ('19,'21)	None
2018	Michael Rexrode	Defense	6'0	180	Florida Launch (MLL)	2nd round (16th overall)	Atlas LC	1x All Star '21)	None
2018	Christian Mazzone	Midfield	5'9	165	Ohio Machine (MLL)	3rd round (22nd overall)	Waterdogs LC	None	None
2019	Kyle Pless	LSM	5'10	178	Denver Outlaws (MLL)	7th round (63rd overall)	Atlas LC	None	None
2021	Connor Kirst	Midfield	6'3	230	Whipsnakes LC	1st round (7th overall)	Whipsnakes LC	None	None
2021	Adam Charalambides	Attack	6'2	195	Undrafted	Undrafted	Cannons LC	None	None
2022	Colin Kirst	Goalie	6'2	220	Cannons LC	3rd round (24th overall)	Cannons LC	None	None
2022	Mitch Bartolo	Attack	6'6	238	Redwoods LC	4th round (27th overall)	Redwoods LC	None	None
2022	Brennan Kamish	D Midfield	6'0	188	Undrafted	Undrafted	Whipsnakes LC	None	None
2022	Ethan Rall	LSM	5'9"	186	Undrafted	Undrafted	Cannons LC	None	None
